= Ballingdon Bottom =

Valley in Hertfordshire, England

Coordinates: 51.8158°N 00.4954°W

- Location within Hertfordshire
- OS grid reference: TL0314
- Shire county: Hertfordshire
- Region: East
- Country: England
- Sovereign state: United Kingdom
- Post town: Hemel Hempstead
- Postcode district: HP2
- Police: Hertfordshire
- Fire: Hertfordshire
- Ambulance: East of England

Ballingdon Bottom is a valley in Hertfordshire, England. It forms part of the boundary between the civil parishes of Flamstead and Great Gaddesden.

== Parish and county boundaries ==
Historically, Ballingdon Bottom was the name given to an area to the north of the valley which was a detached part of the parish of Whipsnade and an exclave of Bedfordshire, surrounded by Hertfordshire. In 1825 Parliament looked into detached parts of counties, with a report being compiled from information from the Clerks of the Peace for each county. It appears the clerks did not always have detailed local knowledge of the detached parts they reported upon. The Bedfordshire clerk opened his return by saying "I have no official knowledge of the boundaries of this county", but went on to say that based on a 1765 map by Thomas Jeffreys it appeared that "a small part of the Parish of Studham, in the Hundred of Manshead, in the County of Bedford, being part of Beachwood [sic] Park, belonging to Sir John Sebright, bart. is locally situate in the County of Hertford". The Jeffreys map does not actually specify which parish the detached area was in, merely labelling it "Part of Bedford S[hire]"; the notion that it belonged to Studham seems therefore to have been a mistake by the clerk. The Whipsnade tithe survey of 1844, which relied on more detailed local surveys and knowledge, confirmed that the detached area was in fact part of Whipsnade parish and that it was known as Ballingdon Bottom.

The Parliamentary Boundaries Act 1832 identified certain detached parts of counties which should be treated for parliamentary constituency purposes as part of the county in which they were physically located. Schedule M of the act described this area as "Part of Studham Parish, partly in Beechwood Park in the County of Hertford", presumably being based on the mistaken clerk's report of 1825. For electoral purposes it was therefore to be treated as part of Hertfordshire rather than Bedfordshire. The Counties (Detached Parts) Act 1844 transferred the detached areas identified in the 1832 Act for all other purposes. Ballingdon Bottom therefore became part of Hertfordshire on 20 October 1844.

The 1844 Act only changed the county boundaries, and Ballingdon Bottom remained a detached part of the parish of Whipsnade. When district councils were established in December 1894 under the Local Government Act 1894 Ballingdon Bottom became part of the Markyate Rural District, which covered the parts of the Luton Poor Law Union which were in Hertfordshire. The complicated boundaries in this area were rationalised in 1897 when Ballingdon Bottom was transferred from Whipsnade to become part of the parish of Flamstead in Hemel Hempstead Rural District on 30 September 1897.
