= Luton Rural District =

History of Bedfordshire

Coordinates: 51.909°N 0.514°W

- Rural district
Coat of arms
- Population
  - 1901: 8,333
  - 1971: 34,315
- History
  - Created: 28 December 1894
  - Abolished: 31 March 1974
  - Succeeded by: South Bedfordshire
  - HQ: Luton (1894–1967); Houghton Regis (1967–1974)
- Contained within
  - County Council: Bedfordshire
- Map of boundary as of 1971

Luton Rural District was a local authority in Bedfordshire, England from 1894 to 1974. It covered an area which almost surrounded but did not include the towns of Luton and Dunstable.

== Formation ==
The district had its origins in the Luton Rural Sanitary District. This had been created under the Public Health Acts of 1872 and 1875, giving public health and local government responsibilities for rural areas to the existing boards of guardians of poor law unions.

Under the Local Government Act 1894, rural sanitary districts became rural districts from 28 December 1894. The link with the poor law union continued, with all the elected councillors of the rural district council being ex officio members of the Luton Board of Guardians. The first meeting of the new council was held on 5 January 1895 in the board room of the Luton Union Workhouse on Dunstable Road in Luton. The council's first chairman, Edward Barnard, had been the chairman of the previous board of guardians. He would continue to serve as chairman of the district council until 1912.

A small part of the Luton Rural Sanitary District was in Hertfordshire. When rural district councils were created in 1894 that area became the short-lived Markyate Rural District, until boundary changes in 1897 split that district between the Hemel Hempstead Rural District in Hertfordshire and the Luton Rural District.

Luton Rural District also included the parts of the parish of Luton outside the municipal borough of Luton, with that area initially becoming a parish that was also called Luton Rural. The Luton Rural parish was split into four civil parishes called Hyde, Leagrave, Limbury, and Stopsley on 1 April 1896.

On 1 April 1928 the parishes of Leagrave and Limbury were abolished, being absorbed into the borough of Luton. The parish of Stopsley followed suit on 1 April 1933. Also on 1 April 1933 the Luton Rural District was substantially enlarged when it took in nearly all the former Eaton Bray Rural District, as well as the parish of Toddington from the Ampthill Rural District.

The district council was granted a coat of arms on 20 September 1959.

The rural district contained the following civil parishes:

- Barton-le-Clay
- Billington (after 1933)
- Caddington
- Chalgrave (after 1933)
- Eaton Bray (after 1933)
- Eggington (after 1933)
- Heath and Reach (after 1933)
- Hockliffe (after 1933)
- Houghton Regis
- Humbershoe (Abolished 1897 and area transferred to Hertfordshire.)
- Hyde (Created 1896 on abolition of Luton Rural parish.)
- Kensworth (after 1897)
- Leagrave (Created 1896 on abolition of Luton Rural parish, absorbed into Luton Borough 1928.)
- Limbury (Created 1896 on abolition of Luton Rural parish, absorbed into Luton Borough 1928.)
- Luton Rural (Created 1894 from that part of Luton parish not in the borough, abolished 1896.)
- Stanbridge (after 1933)
- Stopsley (Created 1896 on abolition of Luton Rural parish, absorbed into Luton Borough 1933.)
- Streatley
- Studham
- Sundon
- Tilsworth (after 1933)
- Toddington (after 1933)
- Totternhoe
- Whipsnade

== Premises ==
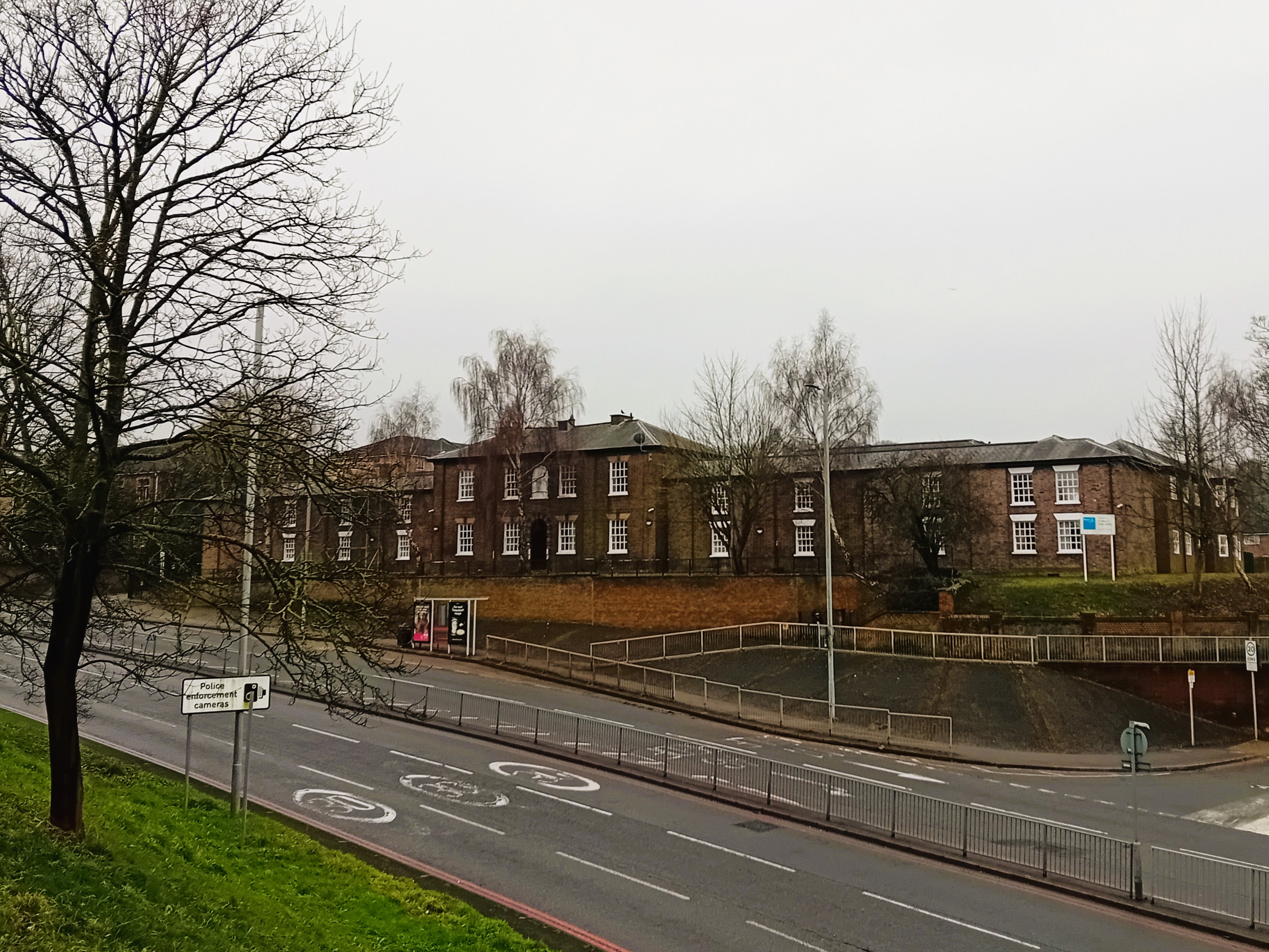
Former Luton Union Workhouse

Until 1939 the council met at the board room of the Luton Union Workhouse, later called the Public Assistance Institution, at 11a Dunstable Road in Luton. That building later became St Mary's Hospital, Luton.

In 1939 the council moved to 42 Bute Street in the centre of Luton, holding its meetings there from September 1939. The council remained at 42 Bute Street until 1967.

In 1967 the council moved to new purpose-built offices on Sundon Road in Houghton Regis.

== Abolition ==
The district was abolished in 1974 under the Local Government Act 1972, combining with other districts to become part of South Bedfordshire. The new South Bedfordshire District Council continued to use the offices on Sundon Road in Houghton Regis until 1989, when new offices were opened in Dunstable. The Sundon Road offices were demolished and Hammersmith Close built on the site.

South Bedfordshire in turn was abolished in 2009, with the area becoming part of Central Bedfordshire.
