= Lower Woodside =

Hamlet in Bedfordshire, England

Coordinates: 51.8550°N 0.4467°W

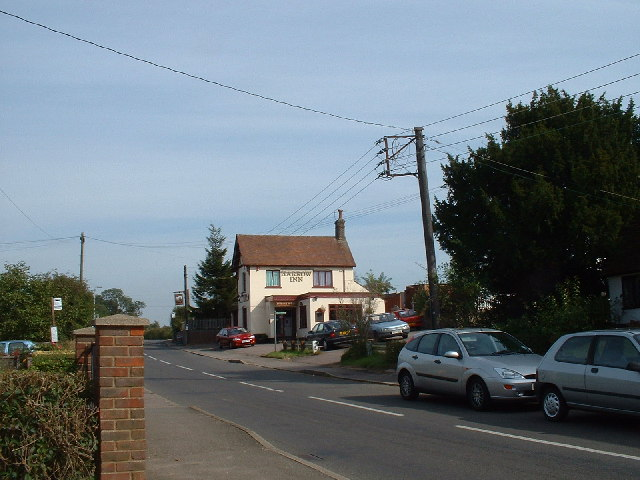
- The Harrow pub, Lower Woodside, 2002

- Location within Bedfordshire
- OS grid reference: TL070185
- Civil parish: Slip End
- Unitary authority: Central Bedfordshire
- Ceremonial county: Bedfordshire
- Region: East
- Country: England
- Sovereign state: United Kingdom
- Post town: LUTON
- Postcode district: LU1
- Dialling code: 01582
- Police: Bedfordshire
- Fire: Bedfordshire
- Ambulance: East of England
- UK Parliament: Luton South

Lower Woodside is a hamlet in the Central Bedfordshire district of Bedfordshire, England.

The settlement lies north of Aley Green and south-west of Woodside. Lower Woodside forms part of the wider Slip End civil parish, and is close to the county border with Hertfordshire. The nearest large town to the settlement is Luton.
