= Caddington =

Village and civil parish in England

Coordinates: 51.86308°N 0.45679°W

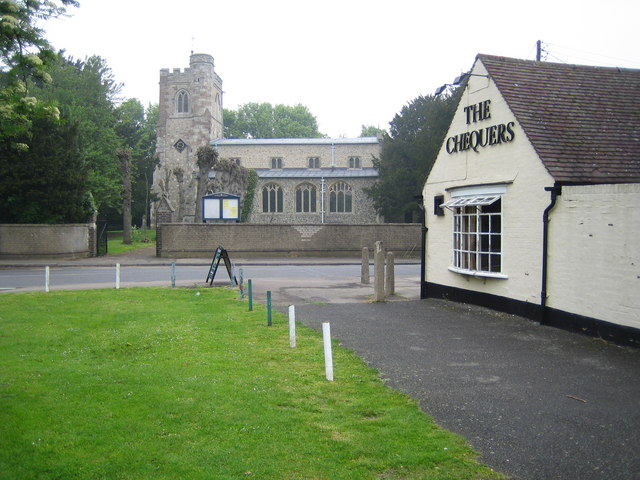

- Location within Bedfordshire
- Population: 4,297 (parish)
- OS grid reference: TL065195
- Civil parish: Caddington
- Unitary authority: Central Bedfordshire
- Ceremonial county: Bedfordshire
- Region: East
- Country: England
- Sovereign state: United Kingdom
- Post town: LUTON
- Postcode district: LU1
- Dialling code: 01582
- Police: Bedfordshire
- Fire: Bedfordshire
- Ambulance: East of England

Caddington is a village and civil parish in the Central Bedfordshire district of Bedfordshire, England.

The western border of the parish is Watling Street, to the west of which is Kensworth. The northern and eastern border are generally formed by the Luton to Dunstable Busway and the M1. To the south-east of the parish is the parish of Slip End, and to the south is Markyate, in Hertfordshire.

Caddington village and the nearby hamlet of Aley Green are in the south of the parish. The hamlet of Chaul End lies in the north of the parish, and at the border with Luton there is Caddington Park with Skimpot in its postal address. The Zouches Farm radio tower is situated in the north-west of the parish.

== History ==
The place-name 'Caddington' is first attested in a list from circa 1000 AD of the manors of St Paul's Cathedral in the Parker Library of Corpus Christi College, Cambridge, where it appears as Caddandun. It appears as Cadandune in the Codex diplomaticus ævi Saxonici of circa 1053, and as Cadendone in the Domesday Book of 1086. The name means 'Cada's down or hill'. Until 1897 the parish of Caddington was partly in Hertfordshire and partly in Bedfordshire.

Caddington was once the centre of a thriving brick industry built around the rich source of clay. In 1908 there were two major brick fields. A "Caddington Blue" was a well-known engineering brick. Caddington Blue could simply be a Luton Grey produced in a high temperature, low oxygen kiln similar to the production method of a Staffordshire Blue for use in foundations etc. Yet the assertion relating to the Caddington Blue is regarded by some as suspect: During the 1970s Bedfordshire County Council in conjunction with the Royal Commission On Historical Monuments (England), published the book Brickmaking: A History and Gazetteer. The book identifies 17 specific sites within the Caddington locale which are credited with producing "Greys". The common name for the plum-coloured brick produced from the flinty brick earths excavated from an area from Kensworth through Caddington to Stopsley is "Luton Grey".

Much of Caddington is now urban, and there has been much residential development in recent years with the provision of local facilities such as shops, schools and a public hall. Caddington still retains its village green and nearby is the medieval parish church, restored in Victorian times. Manshead CE Academy (formerly Dunstable Grammar School and then Manshead School) relocated to Caddington in 1971.

Markyate Priory, which was founded in 1145 and disestablished in 1537, was situated in what was then the parish of Caddington, although that part of the parish was subsequently transferred to Markyate in 1897.

Caddington has had various schools such as Willowfield and Heathfield Lower Schools and Five Oaks Middle School, but these have since been combined into Caddington Village School.

== Governance ==
The parish of Caddington historically straddled Hertfordshire and Bedfordshire, with the boundary running from north to south through the middle of the village itself. The eastern section, which included the parish church of All Saints', was in Bedfordshire, whilst the western section was in Hertfordshire. At the southern end of the parish it included part of the village of Markyate, where a chapel of ease was built in 1734, dedicated to St John the Baptist.

From 1835 the whole parish was included in the Luton Poor Law Union.

An ecclesiastical parish was created for Markyate in October 1877 from parts of Caddington, Flamstead, Studham and Houghton Regis ecclesiastical parishes, although the civil parish boundaries were not changed at the same time. Proposals were put forward in 1888 to also make Markyate a civil parish and rationalise the boundaries between Hertfordshire and Bedfordshire in this area, but were not implemented.

Under the Local Government Act 1894 elected parish councils and district councils were established. Parishes which straddled county boundaries were to be split or otherwise have boundaries amended so as to place them wholly in one county. The parish of Caddington was split into two separate parishes, both called Caddington, one in Hertfordshire and one in Bedfordshire. The two new parishes came into effect on 13 December 1894 when the newly elected councils came into office. The Caddington (Hertfordshire) parish was included in the Markyate Rural District and the Caddington (Bedfordshire) parish was included in the Luton Rural District. On 30 September 1897 the boundary changes first proposed in 1888 were finally brought into effect, making Markyate a civil parish and merging the rest of the two Caddington parishes into one, which was thereafter entirely in the Luton Rural District in Bedfordshire.

Caddington parish was renamed "Caddington and Slip End" on 1 July 1980. on 1 January 2001 it was renamed back to "Caddington", Slip End became a separate civil parish on 1 April 2001.

== Sport and leisure ==
Caddington has a Step 7 Male Saturday team Caddington F.C. competing in the Spartan South Midlands League and another Male Saturday team in the Bedfordshire County League, two Sunday all age male teams and a Male Sunday Veterans team. There is also an Under 18 women’s team and 10 youth teams (some male, some female, some mixed). There is a cricket club with an adult male team and a mixed youth development section. Football and Cricket fixtures are hosted at the Caddington Recreation Association in Manor Road which, as well as providing sports facilities also has a bar and hall for hire.

A single public house, The Chequers, can be found on the Church side of the village green. Caddington has an annual village show in August incorporating a produce show, dog show and craft fair also held at the Caddington Recreation Club.

== Places of worship ==
Caddington has a number of local churches:

- All Saints, Church of England, The Green, LU1 4BG. – An 11/12C church in the middle of the village.
- St Thomas Apostle, Catholic Church, Manor Road– A small church next to the Recreation & Social Club on the south side of the village. Mass Saturday 18:00.
- Aley Green Methodist Church (Methodist), Mancroft Road, Aley Green, LU1 4DR. – In the nearby village of Aley Green.

== Notes and references ==
Brickmaking - A History & Gazetteer 1979. ISBN 0-901051-86-1
