= Holywell, Bedfordshire =

Hamlet in Bedfordshire, England

Coordinates: 51.84373°N 0.52649°W

Holywell
- Location within Bedfordshire
- OS grid reference: TL016171
- Civil parish: Studham
- Unitary authority: Central Bedfordshire
- Ceremonial county: Bedfordshire
- Region: East
- Country: England
- Sovereign state: United Kingdom
- Post town: DUNSTABLE
- Postcode district: LU6
- Dialling code: 01582
- Police: Bedfordshire
- Fire: Bedfordshire
- Ambulance: East of England
- UK Parliament: South West Bedfordshire

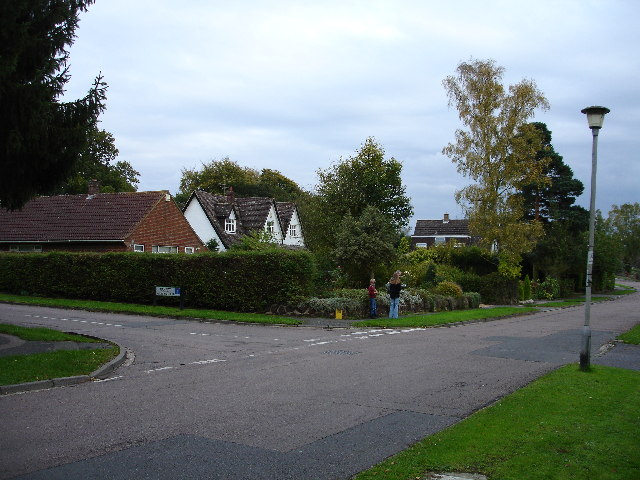
The Holywell hamlet

Holywell is a village located in the Central Bedfordshire district of Bedfordshire, England.

The settlement is close to Whipsnade and Studham, and Holywell forms part of the Studham civil parish (where the 2011 Census population was included). Holywell is also located close to the county border with Hertfordshire.
