= Kensworth =

Village in Central Bedfordshire, England

Coordinates: 51.85°N 0.5°W

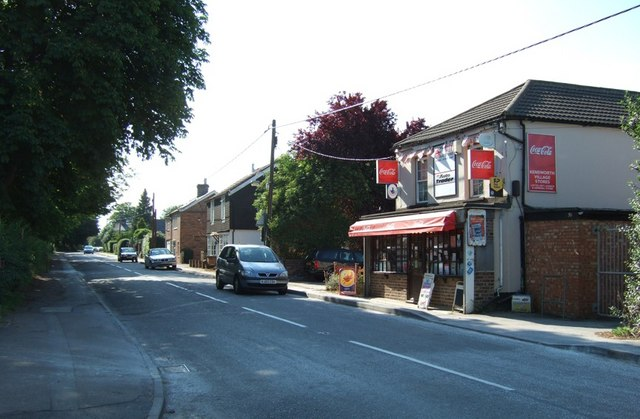
- Kensworth

- Location within Bedfordshire
- Population: 1,517 (parish)
- Civil parish: Kensworth
- Unitary authority: Central Bedfordshire
- Ceremonial county: Bedfordshire
- Region: East
- Country: England
- Sovereign state: United Kingdom
- Post town: DUNSTABLE
- Postcode district: LU6
- Dialling code: 01582
- Police: Bedfordshire
- Fire: Bedfordshire
- Ambulance: East of England
- UK Parliament: South West Bedfordshire

Kensworth is a village and civil parish located in the Central Bedfordshire district of Bedfordshire, England. The parish is located on the edge of Dunstable Downs, and includes the hamlets of California and Kensworth Lynch.

The parish was originally located in Hertfordshire but was transferred to Bedfordshire in 1897. Today the village contains a primary school, a village hall, 2 churches, 2 Village shops and 1 pub.

Kensworth Chalk Pit is a working quarry and is the biggest employer in the parish. The pit is owned and mined by Cemex, but has also been designated a Site of Special Scientific Interest by Natural England.

The Church of St Mary is located in the village. Kensworth Parish Council administers some local services and facilities in the parish, including a village recreation ground and a provision of allotments. The council has 8 members who are elected every 4 years.

At the time of the 2021 United Kingdom census, Kensworth had a population of 1,517, a 4% increase from 1,455 in 2011.

== Governance ==
The parish of Kensworth was originally part of Hertfordshire. When district councils were created under the Local Government Act 1894, Kensworth was included in the Markyate Rural District, which covered the parts of the Luton Poor Law union that were within Hertfordshire. The 1894 Act also created elected parish councils, with Kensworth Parish Council taking over the civil functions of the parish vestry on 13 December 1894.

Shortly afterwards, proposals to rationalise the border between Hertfordshire and Bedfordshire were made, which included transferring Kensworth to Bedfordshire. An inquiry was held at Luton in February 1896, when there were objections from Kensworth Parish Council, which wanted to stay in Hertfordshire, and from Hertfordshire County Council, which felt that it was losing too much rateable value in the proposed transfers. Despite their opposition, the scheme went ahead, with the changes taking effect on 30 September 1897, when Kensworth became part of the Luton Rural District in Bedfordshire.

The Luton Rural District was abolished under the Local Government Act 1972, which saw Kensworth becoming part of South Bedfordshire on 1 April 1974. South Bedfordshire District Council and Bedfordshire County Council were both abolished in 2009. The parish of Kensworth has formed part of the unitary authority of Central Bedfordshire since 1 April 2009.
