= Sallowsprings =

Nature reserve in England

Coordinates: 51.8546°N 0.5371°W

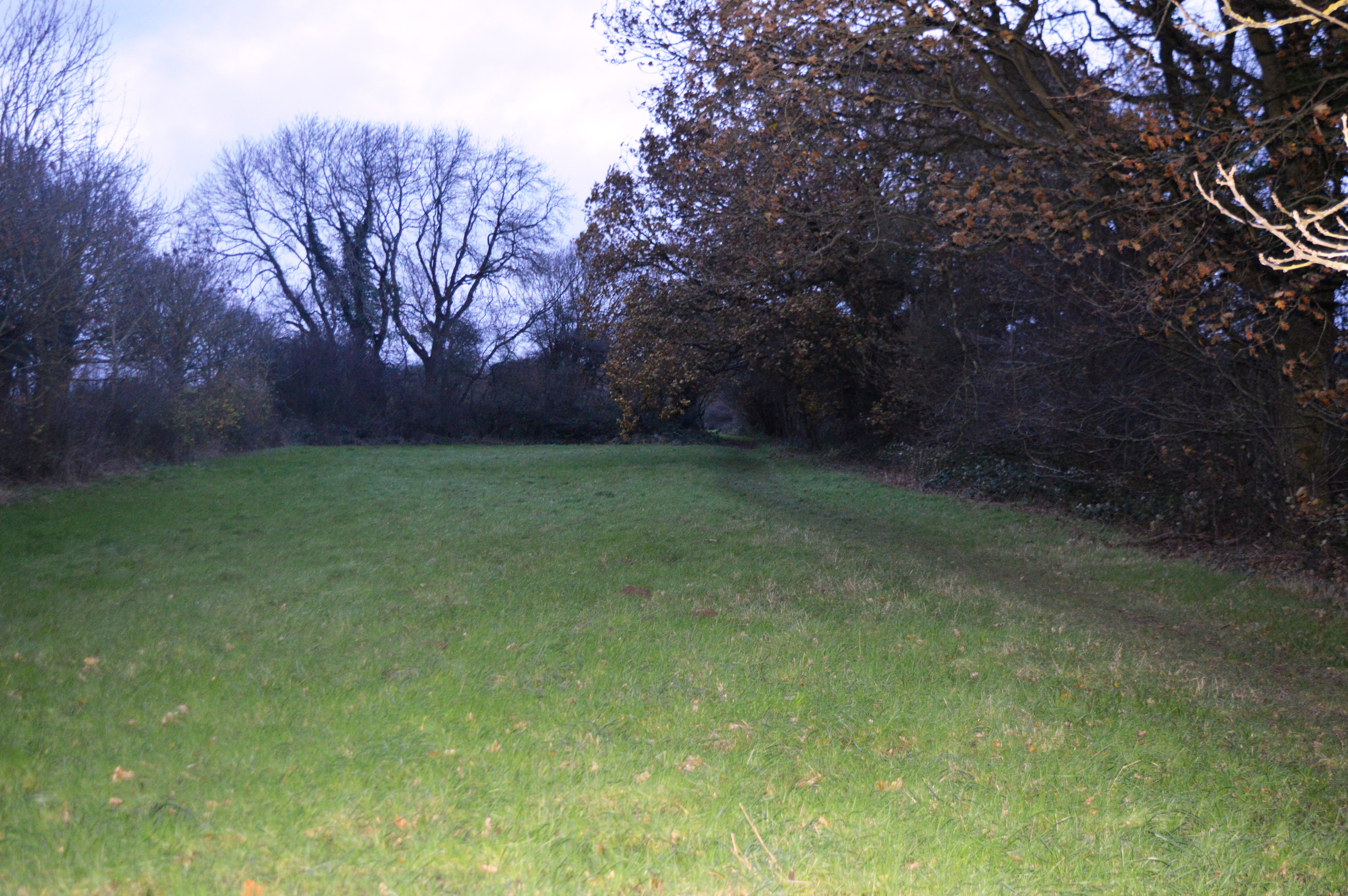

Sallowsprings is a 1.3-hectare (3.2-acre) nature reserve in Whipsnade in Bedfordshire. It is managed by the Wildlife Trust for Bedfordshire, Cambridgeshire and Northamptonshire.

This site was formerly a caravan park, and it is now a traditional hay meadow. A rich variety of flowers includes common knapweed, bluebells and cowslips. An ancient hedgerow has a variety of shrubs such as holly.

There is access from the road called Sallowsprings.
