= Toddington Manor, Bedfordshire =

Manor house in Toddington, Bedfordshire, England

Coordinates: 51.9581°N 0.5415°W

Toddington Manor is a Tudor country house in the English county of Bedfordshire, near the village of Toddington and is a Grade II listed building with a 1745 main block and 1850 additions. It was restored by Sir Neville and Lady Bowman-Shaw from 1979-81. The manor consists of the north-east corner of what was a large, three-courtyard, palace built by Henry Cheyne, 1st Baron Cheyne, circa 1560. Within the grounds are the remains of a 13th-century manor built by Sir Paulinus Pever, a royal steward under Henry III.

== History ==
The Manor estate has an extremely long history going back to well before the Norman invasion in 1066.

Lord Cheney inherited the estates through his mother, Anne Broughton (d. 16 May 1562), granddaughter of Sir Robert Broughton. Cheney was knighted by Elizabeth I in 1563 at the manor.

When Lord Cheney died in 1587 without heirs the Toddington estate passed to his widow Jane, daughter of the 1st Baron Wentworth of Nettlestead, who entertained James I at Toddington in 1608. When she died in 1614, the estates passed to her great-nephew Thomas, 4th Baron Wentworth, later 1st Earl of Cleveland, who, together with his son, ran up enormous debts, which led to his property being sequestered under the Commonwealth in 1650.

An inventory made in 1644 listed most of the rooms and described their furnishings. The main room was the great hall in the north side. This contained "one shovel board, 3 other tables, 2 long forms and 2 short forms". A Great Parlour contained "a great round table, a cupboard, two side tables, 4 leather carpits, 17 leather chairs, 10 leather stools, and 8 griffins to hold lights on". There were two dining rooms, a steward's room, four galleries (one a picture gallery and one containing a billiard table), a chapel, a nursery, a fencing room, a Great Chamber, and several other chambers. The named bedrooms included: My little Ladies Chamber; Mistresses Chamber; Smith's Chamber; The Queen's Chamber; Leicester's Chamber; New Chamber; Cheeks Chamber; and My Ladies Chamber, hung with five pieces of arras and containing a bed with damask valence and curtains. The great kitchen was not mentioned, although this is one of the few rooms to have survived the demolition.

On Cleveland’s death, his granddaughter Henrietta Wentworth, 6th Baroness Wentworth, inherited Toddington.

Baroness Wentworth had a short but tumultuous life; she had an affair with Charles II's illegitimate son, James Scott, 1st Duke of Monmouth, and in 1683 the Duke hid at Toddington Manor after the ill-judged 1683 Rye House Plot to kill the king was discovered. Baroness Wentworth followed Monmouth into exile in Brussels, but returned to Toddington and died at the Manor in 1686 aged 25, one year after Monmouth's execution following the Battle of Sedgemoor.

By 1745, Toddington Manor had fallen into serious disrepair, and was largely dismantled by William Wentworth, 2nd Earl of Strafford (1722–1791), except for the north-east corner containing the kitchens and one of the corner turrets. In 1806, his descendants sold the estate to the Cooper family, who remodelled and extended the remaining part of the house to create the building as it stands today, turning the former great Tudor kitchen with its two huge fireplaces into the present dining room.

The last of the Coopers left Toddington in 1905, after which it was sold several times before being bought by a research farm in 1948, and Sir Neville and Lady Georgina Bowman-Shaw, bought the manor from the research institution in 1979.

The 14,279sq ft house currently consists of several reception rooms, including a drawing room, formal and family dining rooms, a library, a billiard room and a conservatory. Upstairs, the south wing houses the master suite, which has a bedroom, two dressing rooms, a bathroom, a shower room, a sauna and views over the cricket pitch and formal gardens; there are three further bedrooms on the floor above. The main guest suite is in the north wing, with four more en-suite bedrooms in the east wing.

Secondary buildings include a three-bedroom gate lodge and a Grade II-listed stable block with six stables, six garages, offices and two flats.
