= Church of St Mary, Kensworth =

Church in Bedfordshire, England

Coordinates: 51.8604°N 0.5039°W

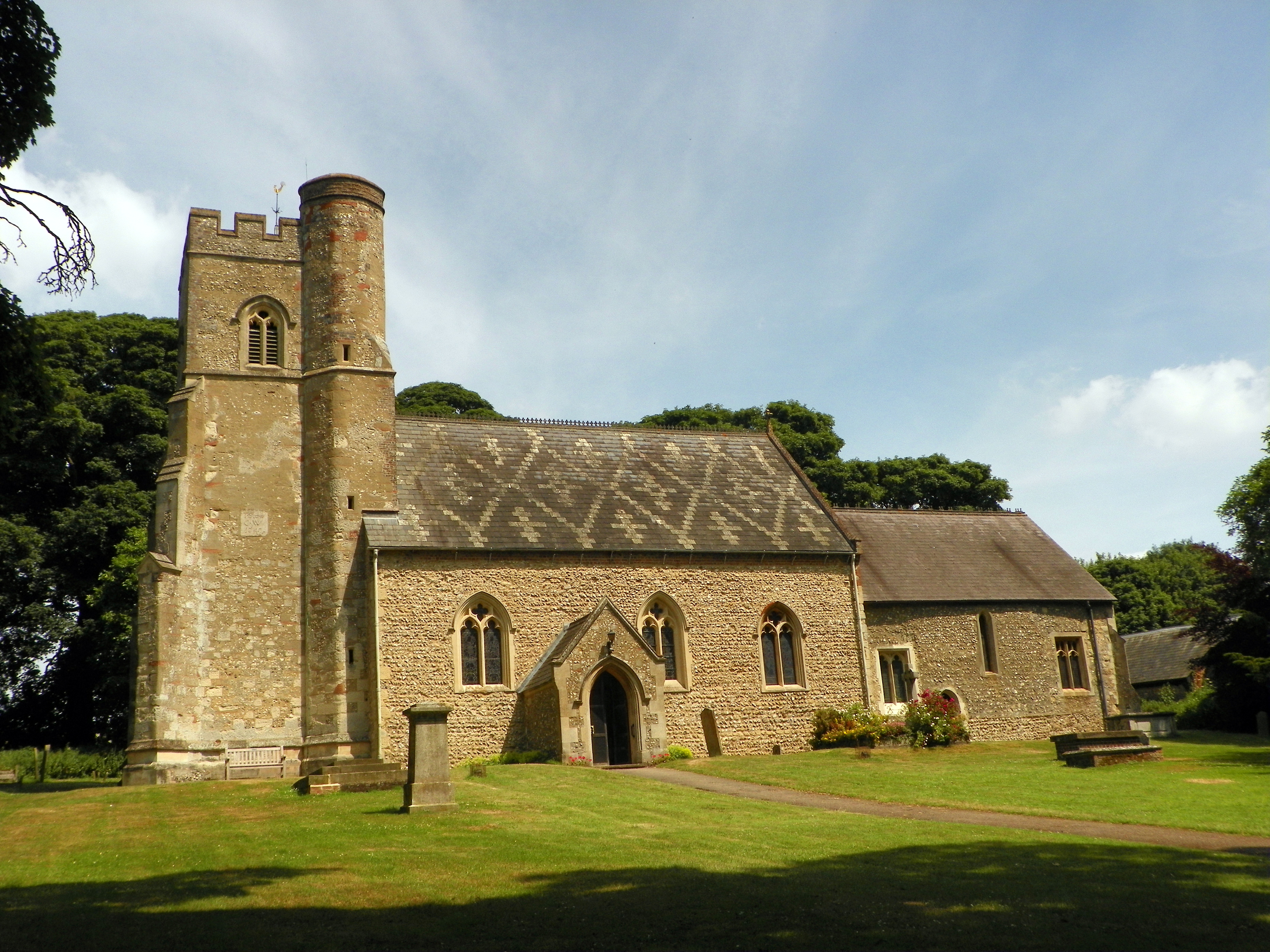
Church of St Mary the Virgin, Kensworth

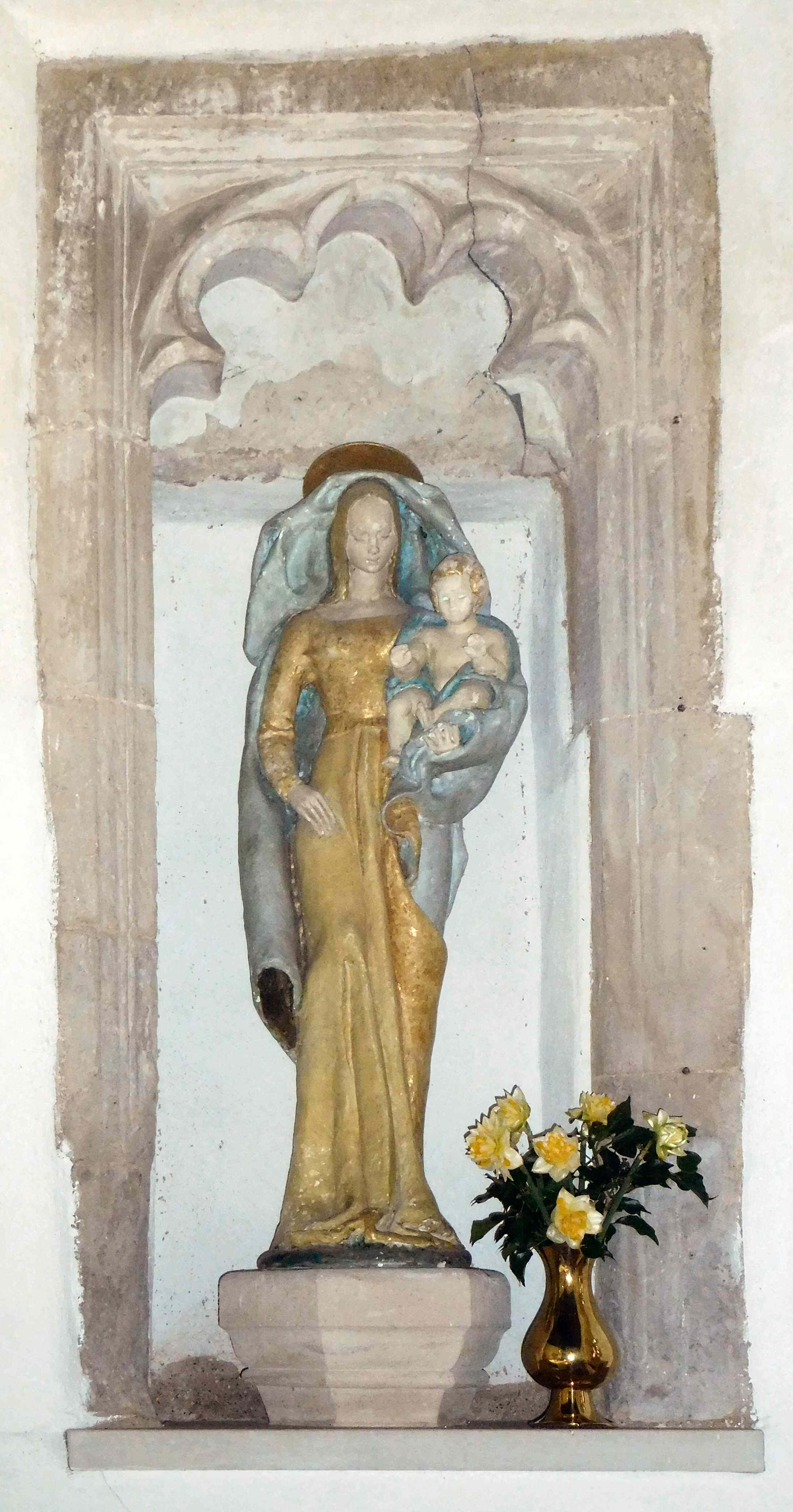
Statue of Madonna and Child

The Church of St Mary the Virgin is a church in the village of Kensworth in Bedfordshire, England. It became a Grade I listed building on 3 February 1967.

== Architecture and restoration ==
The church, being of Norman origin, was mainly built from flint in the early 12th century. Both the tower and the chancel were later built in the 15th century using blocks of clunch from the nearby village of Totternhoe. Eventually falling into poor condition, the chancel was repaired in the 1630s.

The church had five new bells cast in 1717. They were eventually stolen in 1967 in London, having been moved there in 1961 during the restoration of the tower. A new set of six bells were eventually hung in 1971.

The church was buttressed in 1719 and the tower was later roughcast rendered in 1747, as indicated by a plaque on the tower's south face. The church originally had a flat roof until it was rebuilt in 1854, replacing the original lead roof with slate from Westmorland organised in a pattern on the church's south side. Further restoration was done on the church between 1862 and 1878 such as the replacing of doors, repairs to stonework and tiling, re-plastering of walls and cleaning amongst other work.

Relief carvings on the capitals in the church depict stories from Aesop's Fables, two of which being The Wolf and the Crane as well as The Kite and the Doves.

Between 1898 and 1935, numerous stained glass windows were installed around the church, some of which were restored in 1987.

The church has seen numerous work in recent years, such as the restoration of the windows, doorway and west buttresses in 1996 and the construction of a porch on the church's north side in 2000. In 2010, a World War II memorial was added, accompanying the existing World War I memorial dating back to 1920.

== History ==
The first recorded Vicar of Kensworth was John de Sancto Laurentio in 1207.

The parish in which the church is located was situated in Hertfordshire until it was transferred to Bedfordshire in 1897. However, the church remained in the ecclesiastical parish under the Archdeconry of Hertford until 1930 when it was moved under the Archdeaconry of Bedford.

== See also ==
- Grade I listed buildings in Bedfordshire
