= The Bury, Hemel Hempstead =

English building

The Bury
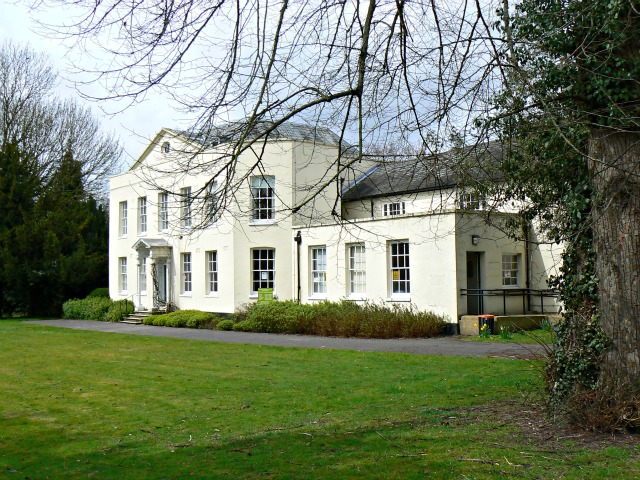
- The Bury, Hemel Hempstead

- Location within Hertfordshire
- Alternative names: Mr Ginger’s Villa

General information
- Status: Closed
- Type: English country house
- Architectural style: Neoclassical
- Location: Hemel Hempstead, United Kingdom
- Coordinates: 51.7576°N 0.4738°W
- Estimated completion: 1790
- Landlord: Dacorum Borough Council

Design and construction
- Designations: Grade II listed

The Bury is a building of historical significance in Hemel Hempstead in the county of Hertfordshire, England. It was erected in about 1790 by an attorney who worked in the town. It was the residence for the next two centuries of many notable people. It is now owned by the Dacorum Borough Council and is Grade II* listed.

== Ginger family ==
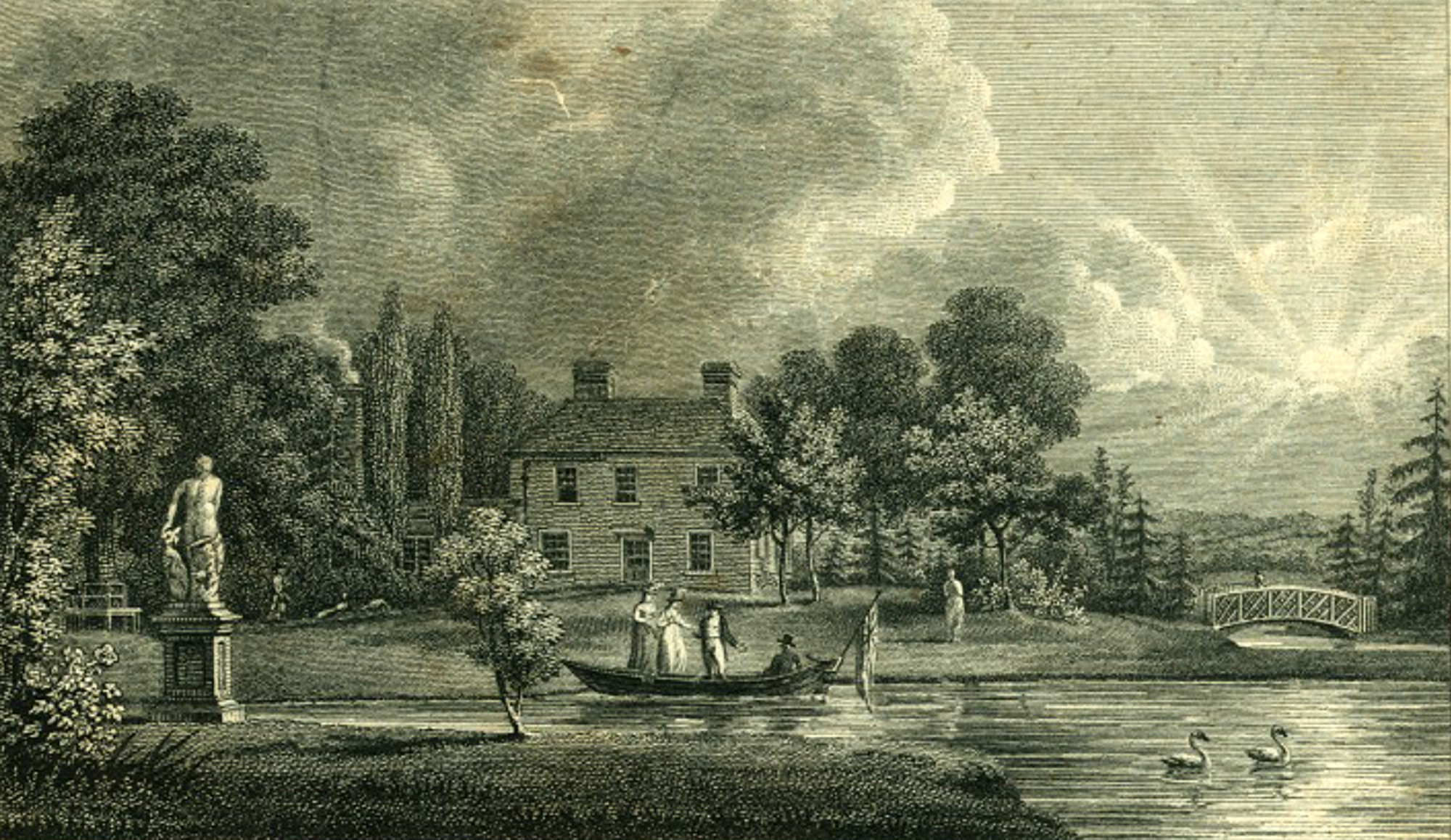
The Bury in 1795

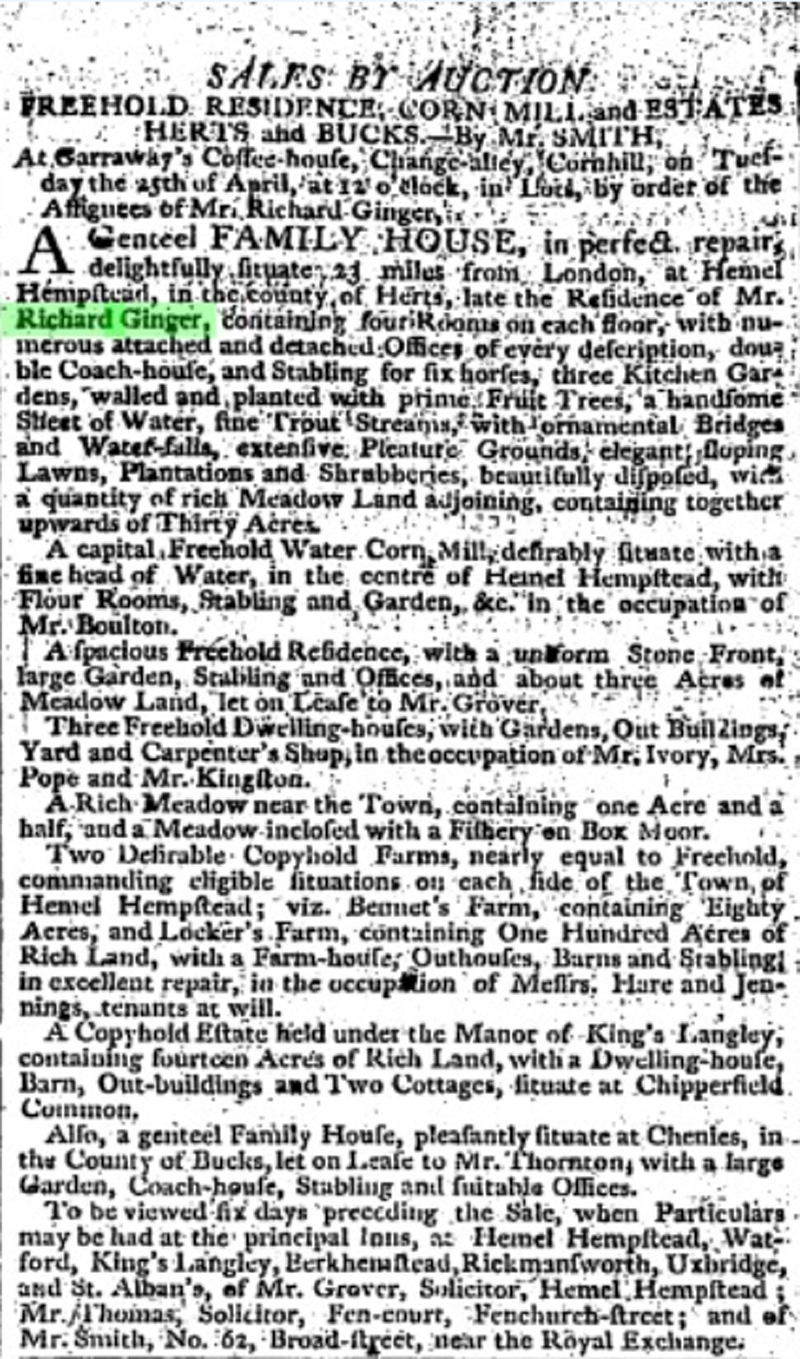
Advertisement for the sale of the Bury in 1797

William Ginger (1742–1793), an attorney, erected the current building in about 1790. He demolished a manor house on the site, which had previously been owned by his father William Ginger (1699–1783), who was also an attorney. He appears to have been unmarried because, when he died in 1793 at the age of only 51, the house was inherited by his younger brother Richard Ginger. In 1796 the magazine called the Monthly Mirror published an article about the property, which contained an etching of the house. They described the estate which they called "Mr Ginger’s Villa" in the following terms:

The grounds are enriched with a canal, waterfall, streams in every direction and rural scenes of diversified and elegant simplicity accompanied by intellectual discernment and manly taste. The house is simple and plain.

Shortly after this, Richard Ginger, who had formerly lived in Queenhithe in London, was declared bankrupt and was forced to sell all of his property. A sale notice for all of his inherited Hemel Hempstead holdings was published in the newspapers in 1797 and is shown. The description of The Bury is as follows:

A Genteel family house in perfect repair delightfully situated at Hemel Hempstead late the residence of Mr Richard Ginger containing four rooms on each floor with numerous attached and detached offices of every description. Double coach house and stabling for six horses, three kitchen gardens walled and planted with prime fruit trees. A handsome sheet of water, fine trout streams with ornamental bridges and waterfalls, extensive pleasure grounds, elegant sloping lawns, plantations and shrubberies beautifully disposed with a quantity of rich meadow land adjoining, containing together upwards of thirty acres.

William Hilton, a merchant who traded in England and Ireland, bought the property and lived there for about ten years.

== Grover family ==
Harry Grover (1761–1835) was a resident in The Bury from about 1808 until his death in 1835. He was born in 1761 in Hammersmith. His father was Montague Grover (1723–1795) and his mother was Letitia Moody. He became a solicitor, and married Sibylla Ehret, who was the granddaughter of the famous botanical artist Georg Dionysius Ehret. The couple lived in Watford for some years, and then in about 1792 they moved to Hemel Hempstead, where they rented several houses before they tenanted The Bury in about 1808 and later bought it. As well as being a solicitor, he became a banker and established the firm Grover and Pollard.

The couple had ten children. One of them, Henry Montague Grover, became a notable writer. Henry died in 1835, and his wife Sibylla continued to live at The Bury until her death in 1853. The house was advertised for sale in 1854 and was bought by Anthony Thatcher.

== Residents after 1850 ==
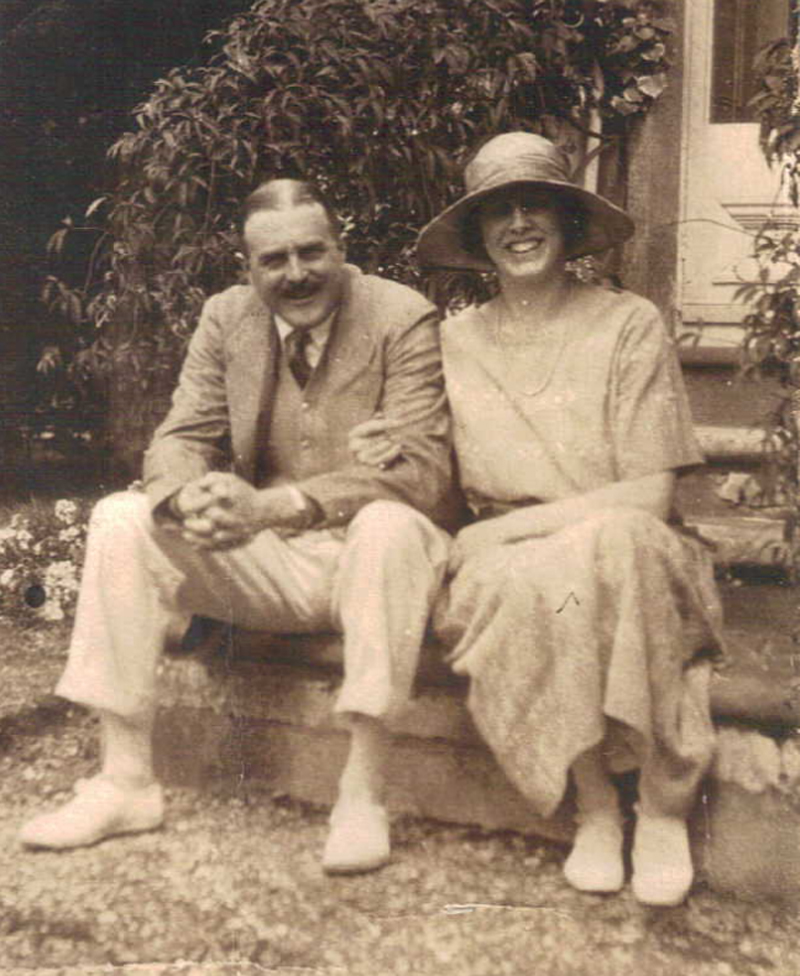
John Hughes Drake and his wife Muriel

Anthony Thatcher (1805–1869) was born in 1805 in Marylebone, Middlesex. He was a glass-bottle manufacturer. He died in 1869, and the house was rented for a few years by Charles Ridgway (1793–1876), a draper and landowner, and his wife Maria. James Brister was a tenant until 1876, when he departed for the Cape of Good Hope.

Henry Wyman (1844–1894) was the next resident. He was a master brewer, and in 1879 he married Marion Steer (1853–1949). The couple lived there until about 1886, and then Rear Admiral Hugh Maximilian Elliot rented the property for two years. From 1888 until about 1892 Robert James Pratt, a school teacher, and his wife Harriet lived in the house. Mrs Anderson was the tenant in 1895; Lieutenant Colonel William Henry Dawes Jones, his wife Emily and children, in 1899.

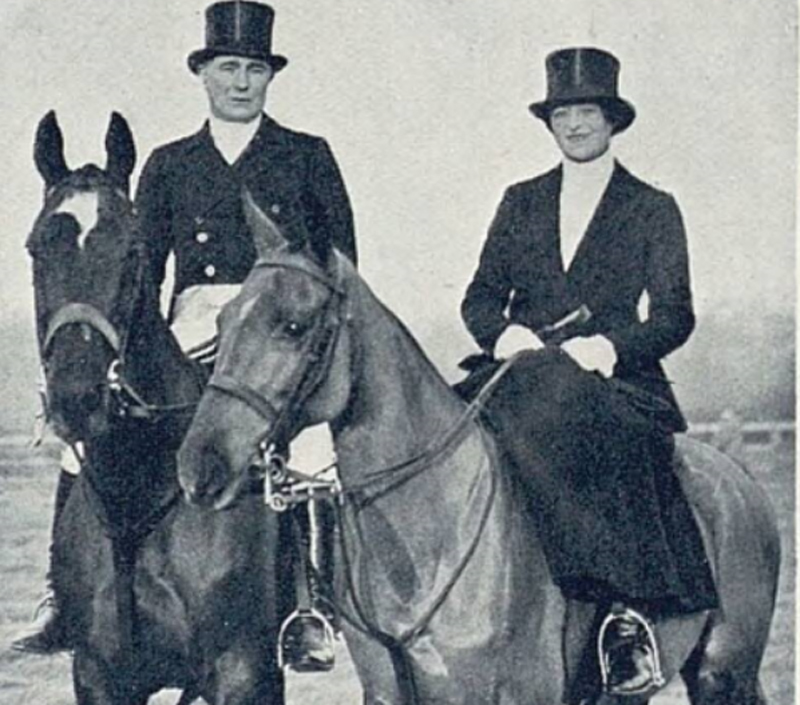
Geoffrey Thomas Unwin and his wife Dora.

In 1908 John Hughes Drake moved into The Bury with his new wife, Muriel Rosdew Raffles-Flint, who was the daughter of Stamford Raffles-Flint, the Archdeacon of Cornwall. Their wedding was reported in detail in the Royal Cornwall Gazette, with accompanying photographs. In 1914 John joined the armed forces as a major and fought in World War I, serving in Egypt and France. He was mentioned in dispatches three times and was awarded the Military Cross in 1917. He was made an Officer of the Order of the British Empire (O.B.E.) on his return from the war in 1919. He joined the family company, called Messrs J. V. Drake and Co., who were sugar merchants.

In 1926 Frederick Oldham Chinner was living at The Bury. By 1928 Judge Edward Watkins Cave was the resident, and he remained there for the next ten years. Geoffrey Thomas Unwin (1874–1948), who was a well-known sportsman, retired at The Bury in about 1944. (Note: Geoffrey Thomas Unwin was born in 1874 in Brincliffe House in Sheffield, Yorkshire. His father was Herbert Unwin, a wealthy businessman. The family moved to Dowdeswell Court near Cheltenham, and in 1898 Geoffrey was invited to play rugby for the Cheltenham Club. He became a star of his day. He also excelled in other sports, including fox hunting. In 1912 he married Dora Florence Goddard-Ball, an actress whose stage name was Dora Langham. The couple lived for some time in Scarborough and were members of the Staintondale Hunt. Geoffrey Unwin died in 1948 at The Bury.) In 1954 the building was bought by Hemel Hempstead Rural District Council and was converted for use as their offices. From 1969 the building was also used as a registry office as well as council offices. The building passed from Hemel Hempstead Rural District Council to Dacorum Borough Council when local government was reorganised in 1974.

== Museum and art gallery proposals ==
In 2016, Dacorum Council vacated the building and relocated its registry office to Hemel town centre.

In 1983 Dacorum Museum Advisory Committee identified The Bury as potential building to house a museum. The successor organisation, local history advocacy group Dacorum Heritage, began negotiations with Dacorum Council in 2011 for converting the building should into a museum and art gallery, to display a collection of archaeological and historical artefacts from the surrounding area. In 2013, they announced that the "Phoenix Project" was holding discussions with the council and the National Lottery Heritage Fund. The project is currently awaiting necessary funding and planning permission to proceed.

In September 2026, the Bury was listed for sale by an estate agent, offering the building with options to divide the 0.8-hectare (2-acre) estate into smaller individual plots for development. Dacorum Borough Council subsequently announced that the sale listing had been posted in error and withdrew the sale.

== See also ==
- Category:Local museums in Hertfordshire
- Category:Art museums and galleries in Hertfordshire
