= Toddington Town Band =

- Founded: 1856 (1910)
- Founder: James Hyde
- Type: Community association
- Location(s): Toddington Social and Services CIU Club; 15 High Street Toddington; LU5 6BX; UK
- Coordinates: 51°56′52″N 0°31′57″W
- Region served: United Kingdom
- Members: about. 35
- Key people: Musical director: Kenny Durbin; Chairperson: Andrea Horsler; Band sergeant: Nick Wall
- Website: toddingtontownband.weebly.com

Toddington Town Band is an English brass band. For over one hundred years, Toddington Town Band has brought music to audiences across Bedfordshire and beyond. They currently have more than thirty five active players of all ages and standards. Their library of over 400 pieces of music means they are able to play a wide range of music of differing genres.

== History ==
Toddington Town Band has flourished against a backdrop of bombs, the Blitz, boom and bust. The first reference to the Toddington Brass Band was in an 1856 issue of The Dunstable Chronicle but, in 1910, a flurry of other bands including the abstemious 'Temperance Band' and its possibly more entertaining competition 'The Beer and Baccy Band' gave way to one which was established and conducted by James Hyde. That band has kept its name since then, even though their home 'town' is now classed as a village.

With the exception of the First World War, Hyde conducted the band for 41 years until his death in 1951. From the 1920s onwards, the Hyde family transported Toddington Town Band around the country, where the band competed against some of the country's finest. Under James Hyde's baton the band had notable success in competitions. They won the 1937 championship in Reading, and came 2nd in the 1947 area contest, going on to take 3rd place in the national championship (fourth section) held at Belle Vue, Manchester.

In those days, the band practiced in the Park Road band room, later moving to practise in the village Social and Services Club, near the Angel Public House, where they remain today. Denis Hyde took over the baton on the death of his father James in 1951. Denis played trumpet and cornet and was also musical director of the Vauxhall Orchestra and Ladies' Choir. Denis led the band until his death in 1982 and the band came to a temporary halt.

In 1984, Denis's widow, Beryl Hyde, approached Derek Tiller to reform the band. Derek, a former member who had originally joined the band on VE Day in 1945, when it was known as the Toddington Home Guard Band, took up the baton and along with players from Ampthill and Sandy bands, joined the existing players at Toddington to make music as a social band. Derek Tiller moved to Yorkshire in 1986 and the band continued to rehearse under the direction of Ian Smith.

In September 1987, Beryl approached local brass teacher Kevin Nicholls to take the band forward. Kevin formed a new junior band and was musical director of the existing senior band, until John Farmer, a well-known brass player in his own right with Heath Band, took up the baton in 1993.

John conducted for a total of sixteen years, and under his direction, Toddington Town Band not only thrived but flourished, attracting players from well beyond the village boundaries and also appealing to a wider audience. During John's tenure the "junior band" was reintroduced and this has evolved, due to the age range of the players, into a "development band", which continues to go from strength to strength and is now conducted by David Beal.

On John's retirement in 2009, Mick Atkins, a player with the band, took on the post of musical director until November 2011.

2010 saw the band celebrating their centenary year with a programme of local concerts and events, together with a performance at the prestigious Stowe School and a visit to a music festival in France – the first time the band had left British soil. The band also recorded and released their first CD "... Telegram for Toddington ...".

In May 2013, Clive Keech was named musical director. Clive came to the band with many years of experience in the brass band world, both as a player and as a conductor, with conducting appointments locally at both Bradwell Silver and Wolverton Town bands and further afield with Stonesfield Silver and the Hook Norton Band, both from Oxfordshire.

Keech left the band in December 2016, and in the summer of 2017 Kenny Durbin was appointed musical director.
