= Pepperstock =

Village in Bedfordshire, England

Coordinates: 51.8495°N 0.4306°W

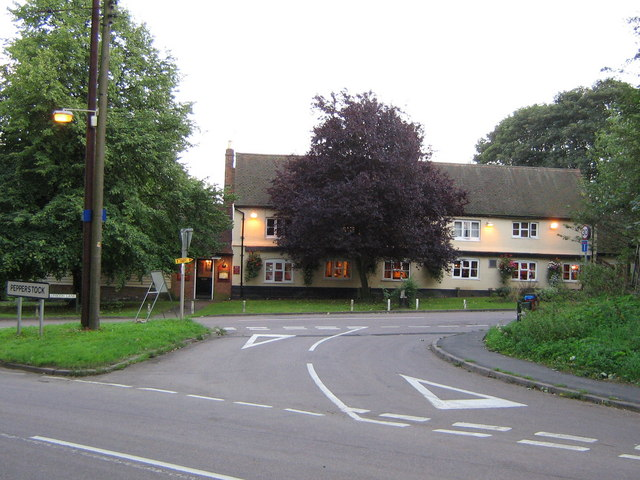
- The Half Moon Public House in Pepperstock

- Location within Bedfordshire
- OS grid reference: TL080871
- Civil parish: Slip End
- Unitary authority: Central Bedfordshire
- Ceremonial county: Bedfordshire
- Region: East
- Country: England
- Sovereign state: United Kingdom
- Post town: LUTON
- Postcode district: LU1
- Dialling code: 01582
- Police: Bedfordshire
- Fire: Bedfordshire
- Ambulance: East of England
- UK Parliament: Luton South

Pepperstock is a small village located in Central Bedfordshire, England. The village itself mostly consists of residential caravan parks. However, Pepperstock displays an interesting range of vernacular buildings, most notably in the form of 16th and 17th century timber framing with brick infill and red clay tiled roofs. It is in the civil parish of Slip End.

== Geography ==
The M1 motorway was opened by Ernest Marples on 2 November 1959 at the Pepperstock Junction (junction 10), previously a motorway spur, now the A1081 (former A6). The two motorway projects, the St Albans Bypass and the Pepperstock-Crick section met at Luton. Motorway construction had begun at Slip End on 24 March 1958.
