= Toddington Castle =

Castle in Toddington (United Kingdom)

- Toddington, Bedfordshire, England

Site information
- Type: Motte-and-bailey
- Condition: Earthworks

Location
- Shown within Bedfordshire
- Coordinates: 51.9496°N 0.5299°W
- Grid reference: grid reference TL0113128916
- Height: 18ft

Site history
- Built: 13th Century
- Materials: Earth

Toddington Castle, today known as "Conger Hill Motte", is an artificial earthen mound located in the village of Toddington, in the county of Bedfordshire, England.

== Details ==
It was a motte-and-bailey castle, made first of timber and later of stone, that dates from prior to the 13th century when it was listed as the stronghold of Sir Paulinus Pegure (Paul Pever), who leased it from Roger Bigod, 2nd Earl of Norfolk. The name Conger Hill is recorded from 1597 and it has been considered that the name may be a corruption of an earlier Celtic British name. The mound was used in the 16th century as a rabbit warren.

The site is a Scheduled Monument, classified as a medieval motte. Only earthworks, which rise 18 ft above the present bottom of the moat and have a flat top 92 ft in diameter without trace of a rampart, remain.

== Folklore ==
For about 150 years, every Shrove Tuesday at Toddington, the 'pancake bell' was rung in the church to remind the women to make their pancakes. On hearing the bell, school children would then run to Conger Hill, put their ears to the ground and, supposedly, listen to the sizzling sound of the 'old woman' frying her pancakes. The last outing of this kind ceased in the early 1970s, perhaps due to the Church's reluctance to be associated with witchcraft, but the tradition was revived in 2012.

== See also ==
- Castles in Great Britain and Ireland
- List of castles in England
