= Fancott Woods and Meadows =

Site of Special Scientific Interest in Bedfordshire, England

Coordinates: 51.937°N 0.51°W

- Site of Special Scientific Interest
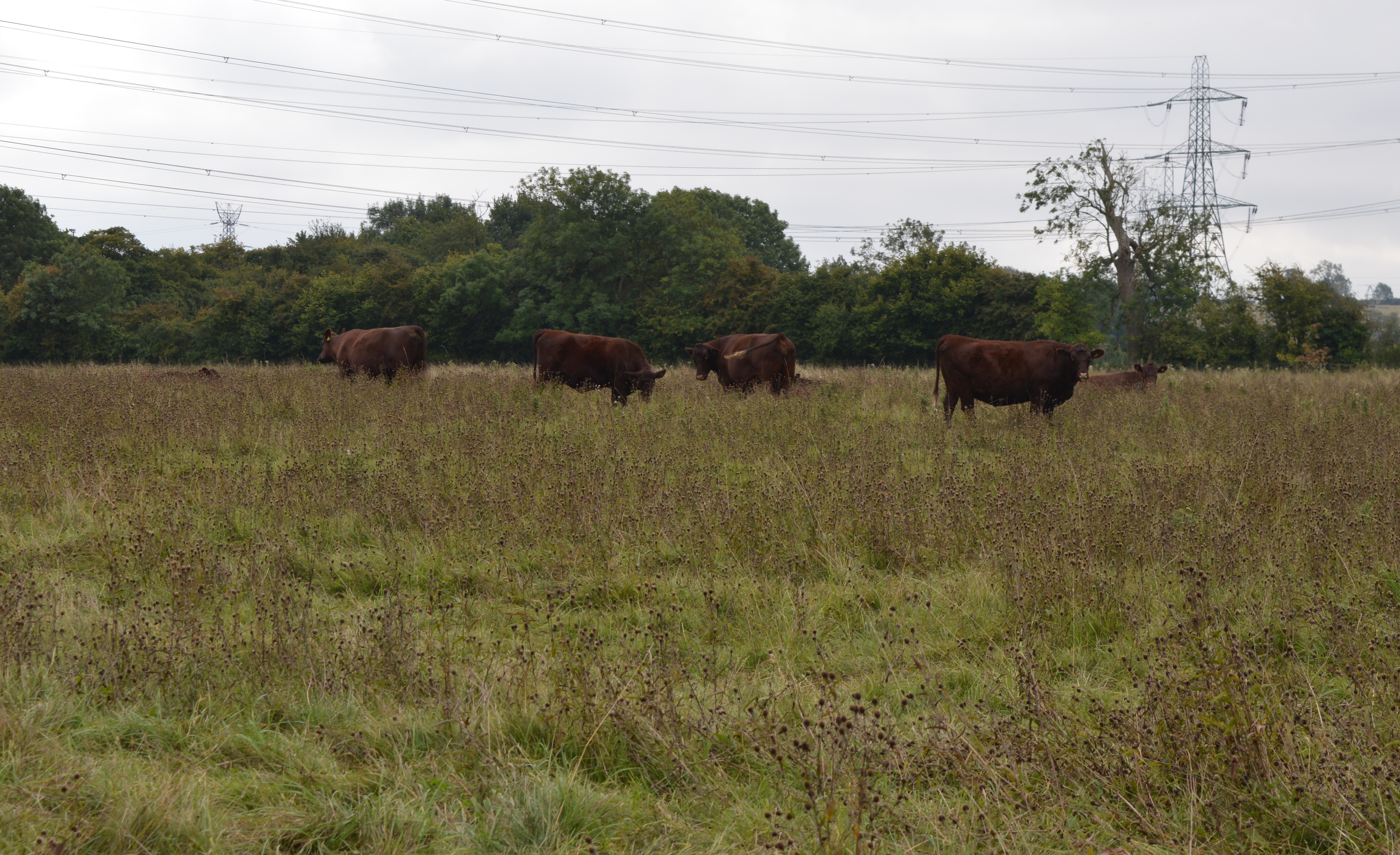
- Cows in Fancott Meadow
- Location of Fancott Woods and Meadows.
- Area of search: Bedfordshire
- Grid reference: TL026276
- Interest: Biological
- Area: 13.3 ha (33 acres)
- Notification date: 1985
- Location map: Magic Map

Fancott Woods and Meadows is a 13.3-hectare Site of Special Scientific Interest near the hamlet of Fancott in Bedfordshire. It was notified under Section 28 of the Wildlife and Countryside Act 1981, and the local planning authority is Central Bedfordshire Council. The site is managed by the Wildlife Trust for Bedfordshire, Cambridgeshire and Northamptonshire.

== Meadow ==
The meadows are mainly ancient ridge and furrow, and are unimproved neutral grassland traditionally managed for hay and grazing. Plants include cowslips, ragged-robin, great burnet, common spotted orchid, red fescue, meadow fescue, crested dog’s-tail, sweet vernalgrass, sedges and meadowsweet. More importantly, a variety of herbs that were common in old meadows but now rare in the county grow there, such as pepper saxifrage, green-winged orchid, dropwort, saw-wort and adder's tongue.

== Woodland ==
The woodland (sometimes referred to as Chalton Spinney) is made up of pedunculate oak, ash and alder species. In the spring, a large number of bluebells cover the woodland, along with primroses and field maple. The wood is the only recorded site in the county for the hybrid sedge Carex pseudaxillaris. There is also a small pond.

== Access ==
There is access from Luton Road north of Fancott.
