= Dropshort Marsh =

Nature reserve in Bedfordshire, England

Coordinates: 51.9378°N 0.5366°W

- Site of Special Scientific Interest
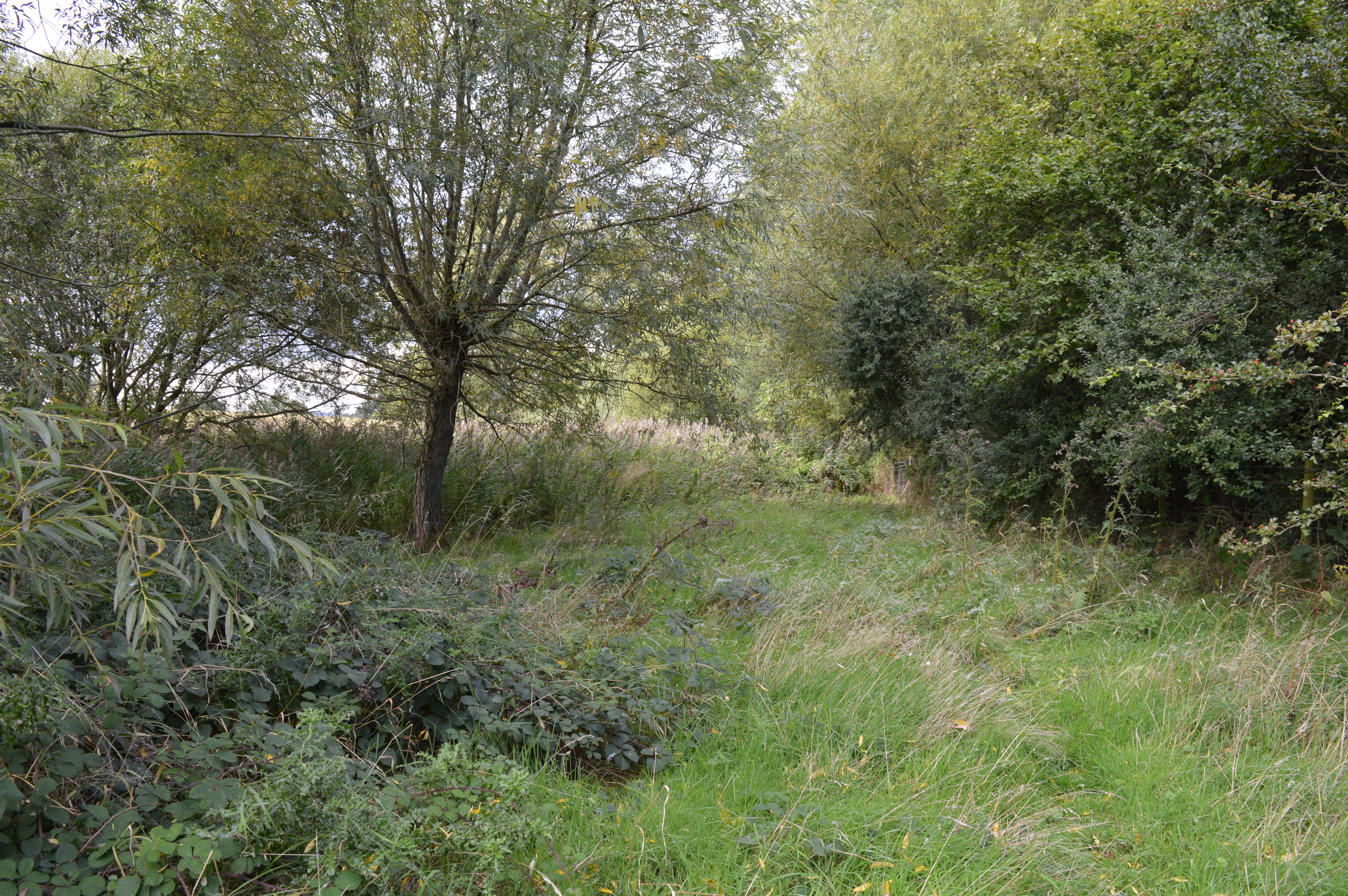
- Location of Dropshort Marsh.
- Area of search: Bedfordshire
- Grid reference: TL005277
- Interest: Biological
- Area: 2.7 ha (6.7 acres)
- Notification date: 1985
- Location map: Magic Map

Dropshort Marsh is a 2.7-hectare (6.7-acre) biological Site of Special Scientific Interest in Toddington in Bedfordshire. It was notified under Section 28 of the Wildlife and Countryside Act 1981 in 1985, and the local planning authority is Central Bedfordshire Council. The site is managed by the Wildlife Trust for Bedfordshire, Cambridgeshire and Northamptonshire.

This marsh has a variety of habitats, including a scarce quaking bog. Many species are now uncommon due to changes in agricultural practices. it has several springs, with floating sweet-grass and brooklime and areas dominated by rushes. Species in drier areas include field woodrush, and there are also mature hedges and pollarded willows.

There is access from Dunstable Road, opposite Dropshort Farm.
