= Kensworth Chalk Pit =

131.3 hectare geological site of Special Scientific Interest

Coordinates: 51.866°N 0.517°W

- Site of Special Scientific Interest
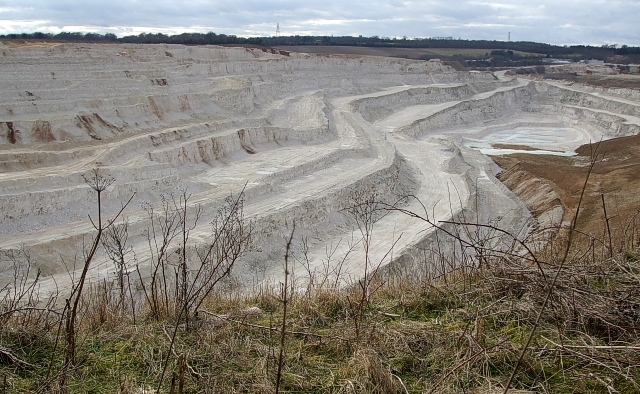
- Location of Kensworth Chalk Pit.
- Area of search: Bedfordshire
- Grid reference: TL015197
- Interest: Geological
- Area: 131.3 ha (324 acres)
- Notification date: 1988
- Location map: Magic Map

Kensworth Chalk Quarry is a 131.3-hectare (324-acre) geological Site of Special Scientific Interest in Kensworth in Bedfordshire. It was notified under Section 28 of the Wildlife and Countryside Act 1981, and the local planning authority is Central Bedfordshire.

The site is a large working quarry which exposes fossiliferous chalk rocks of the late Cretaceous, with many rare fossils including ammonites. Natural England describes it as "an unrivalled locality for stratigraphic studies in the Upper Cretaceous". It is a Geological Conservation Review site, and one succession of layers is the stratotype for the "Kensworth Nodular Chalk Member".

There is no public access.
