= Markyate Rural District =

History of Hertfordshire

Coordinates: 51.836°N 0.460°W

- Rural district
- Population
  - 1891: 1,808
- History
  - Created: 28 December 1894
  - Abolished: 29 September 1897
  - Succeeded by: Luton Rural District
  - HQ: Luton
- Contained within
  - County Council: Hertfordshire

Markyate Rural District was a short-lived rural district in Hertfordshire, England from 1894 to 1897, on the borders with Bedfordshire.

The district was created under the Local Government Act 1894 from the parts of the Luton Rural Sanitary District which were within Hertfordshire. The rest of the Luton Rural Sanitary District became the Luton Rural District. Prior to the 1894 Act the parishes of Caddington and Studham had both straddled the county boundary, and they were each split into separate parishes for the parts in each county, with the Caddington (Hertfordshire) and Studham (Hertfordshire) parishes being included in the Markyate Rural District.

The Markyate Rural District was not a single contiguous area, but two separate blocks of land. The western part comprised the parish of Studham (Hertfordshire) and a detached part of Whipsnade parish. The eastern part comprised the parishes of Caddington (Hertfordshire) and Kensworth. The population of these areas in 1891 had been 1,808. Although the district took its name from the village of Markyate, only the north-eastern part of the village was actually in the Markyate Rural District, with the southern part being in Flamstead parish in the Hemel Hempstead Rural District and the north-western part of Markyate being in the parishes of Humbershoe and Houghton Regis in the Luton Rural District. This gave rise to confusion, with one candidate's nomination at the election in December 1894 being invalid for assuming that Humbershoe was in the Markyate district, when it was in the Luton district.

All the councillors on the Markyate Rural District Council were also guardians on the Luton Board of Guardians, and the Markyate Rural District Council was administered from the workhouse in Luton rather than any premises within the district itself. The first meeting of the Markyate Rural District Council was held on 7 January 1895 at the board room of the Luton Union Workhouse. Frederick William Partridge, a Liberal, was appointed the chairman of the council. He would serve as chairman for the whole of the council's existence.

The Markyate Rural District was effectively created as a temporary measure to comply with the Local Government Act 1894 pending an anticipated rationalisation of boundaries in the area. Proposals had been put forward under the Local Government (Boundaries) Act 1887, but had not been implemented at the time. Discussions on what changes might be acceptable continued after the Markyate Rural District was created. An inquiry was held in February 1896 into a proposal to transfer most of the Markyate Rural District into the Luton Rural District in Bedfordshire, with the exception of the detached part of Whipsnade, which would be added to Flamstead, and the part of Caddington (Hertfordshire) that was within the ecclesiastical parish of St John Markyate, which would become part of a new civil parish of Markyate in the Hemel Hempstead Rural District in Hertfordshire. This was the same proposal as had been put forward under the 1887 act. There were objections from Kensworth, which wanted to stay in Hertfordshire, and from Hertfordshire County Council, which felt that it was losing too much rateable value in the proposed transfers. There was general agreement that the village of Markyate should be brought into a single parish, but disagreement as to whether that parish should be placed in Hertfordshire or Bedfordshire. Eventually the scheme as originally proposed was accepted, with the necessary order being presented to Parliament in May 1897. The changes took effect on 30 September 1897.

== Parishes ==
Markyate Rural District contained the following areas:

- Caddington (Hertfordshire)
- Kensworth
- Studham (Hertfordshire)
- Detached part of Whipsnade known as Ballingdon Bottom
