= Aley Green =

Hamlet in Bedfordshire, England

Coordinates: 51.85137°N 0.44683°W

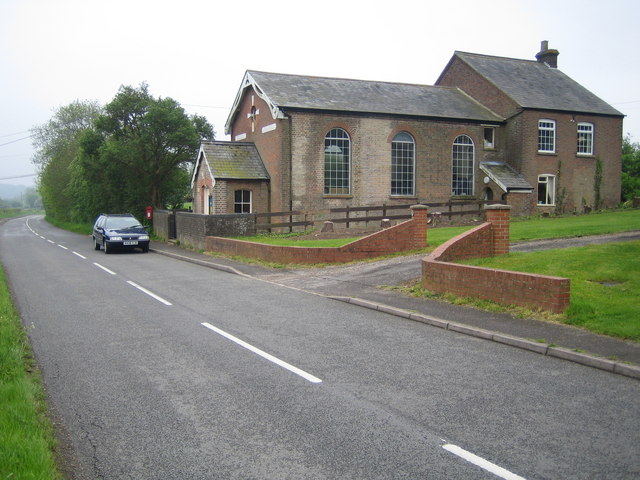
- Wesleyan chapel

- Location within Bedfordshire
- OS grid reference: TL070181
- Civil parish: Caddington
- Unitary authority: Central Bedfordshire
- Ceremonial county: Bedfordshire
- Region: East
- Country: England
- Sovereign state: United Kingdom
- Post town: LUTON
- Postcode district: LU1
- Police: Bedfordshire
- Fire: Bedfordshire
- Ambulance: East of England
- UK Parliament: Luton South

Aley Green is a hamlet in Bedfordshire, England.

Aley Green is within the civil parish of Caddington. However, the cemetery and the southern end of Mancroft Road (including Aley Green Methodist Church) are in the parish of Slip End, though they are considered to be part of Aley Green.

Throughout its history, Aley Green has been a border settlement between Bedfordshire and Hertfordshire. The settlement formerly straddled the border of the two counties, until boundary changes in 1965 brought Aley Green entirely into Bedfordshire.
