= Toddington, Bedfordshire =

Village in Bedfordshire, England

Coordinates: 51°56′58.57″N 0°31′56.28″W

Toddington
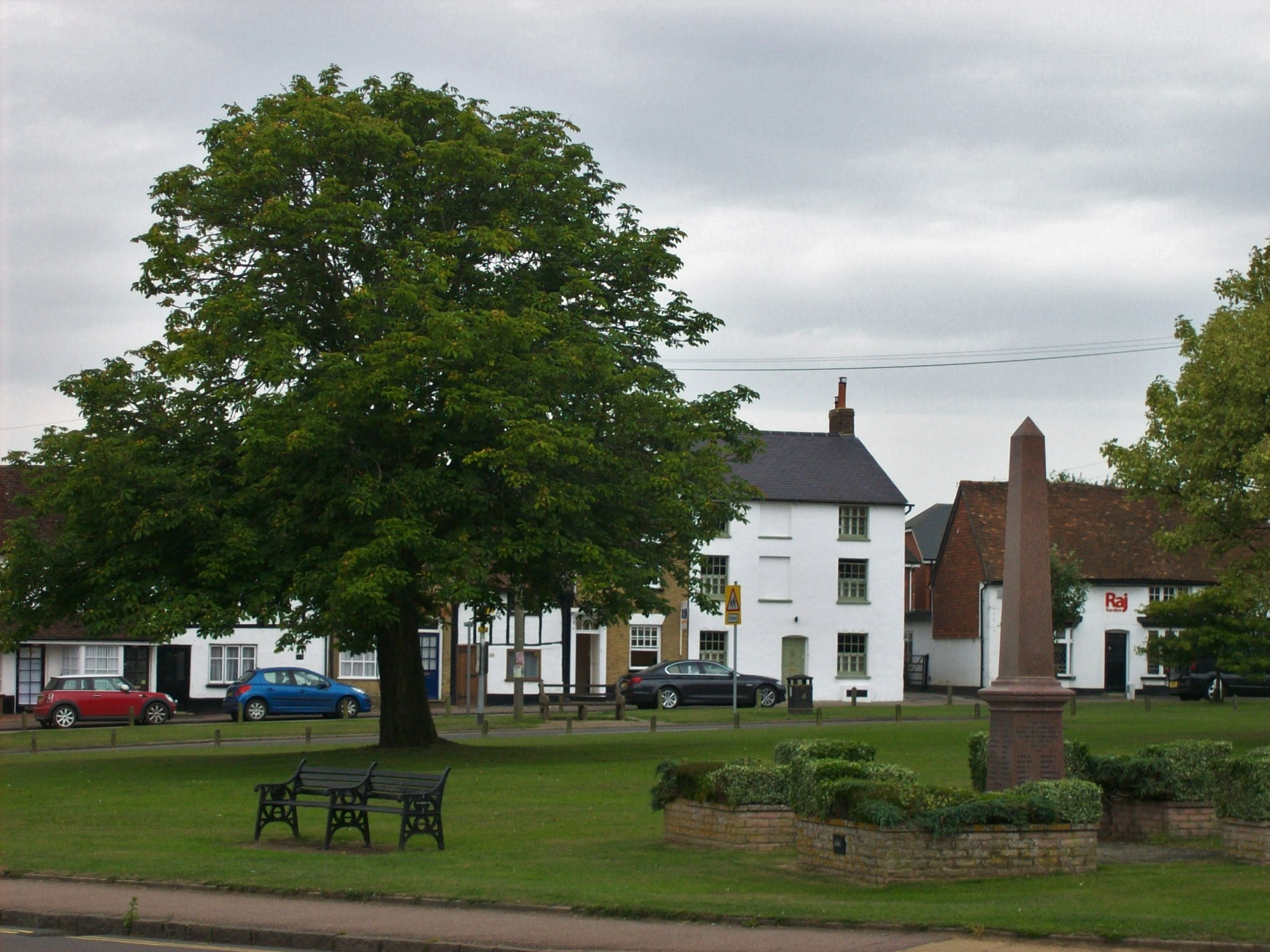
- Toddington village green
- Population: 4,506 (parish)
- OS grid reference: TL009289
- Civil parish: Toddington
- Unitary authority: Central Bedfordshire
- Ceremonial county: Bedfordshire
- Region: East
- Country: England
- Sovereign state: United Kingdom
- Post town: DUNSTABLE
- Postcode district: LU5
- Dialling code: 01525
- Police: Bedfordshire
- Fire: Bedfordshire
- Ambulance: East of England
- UK Parliament: Mid Bedfordshire

Toddington is a town and civil parish in the county of Bedfordshire, England. It is situated 5 miles north-north-west of Luton, 4 miles (6 km) north of Dunstable, 6 miles (10 km) south-west of Woburn, and 35 miles north-north-west of London on the B5120 and B579. It is 0.5 miles from Junction 12 of the M1 motorway and lends its name to the nearby motorway service station. The hamlet of Fancott also forms part of the Toddington civil parish.

Toddington is built around a large village green, around which sit the parish church and four of the village's six public houses. The Dunstable Northern Bypass taking heavy traffic bound for Dunstable from the M1 away from the village was delayed but a restart was announced in September 2011, and opened in May 2017. A large-scale housebuilding programme has been proposed by the government for the environs of Luton, Dunstable and Milton Keynes, and proposals to build a 20,000 seat football stadium to replace Kenilworth Road were withdrawn in 2008.

Toddington has experienced a rise in house prices due to its reputation as a quiet English village and the easy commute into London.

For local government purposes it is in the Central Bedfordshire unitary authority, and is in the Mid-Bedfordshire parliamentary constituency, represented since 19 October 2023 by Labour MP Alistair Strathern.

== Geography ==
Toddington is situated on a hill formed of glacial sand and gravel above a layer of glacial till on top of the Cretaceous Gault Clay (see the 1:50,000 Sheet 220 Leighton Buzzard Solid and Drift Geology by the British Geological Survey). The hill has a maximum height of 154 m and the village is about 30 m above the other Mid-Bedfordshire villages and towns (e.g. Westoning, Harlington, Flitwick).

== Amenities ==
Toddington has four churches: Church of England (St George), Methodist, Baptist, and a Christian Fellowship.

The nearest mainline railway station is Harlington, which is located in the nearby village of Harlington and is served by Thameslink. From Harlington there are trains north to Flitwick and Bedford, and south to Luton, Luton Airport Parkway, St Albans, St Pancras International, Gatwick Airport and Brighton. The Fancott Arms hosts the rideable miniature railway at Fancott.

Dropshort Marsh and Fancott Woods and Meadows, both close to the village, are managed as nature reserves by the Wildlife Trust for Bedfordshire, Cambridgeshire and Northamptonshire, and each is designated a Site of Special Scientific Interest.

There are several public rights of way within the parish and there are many walks and rides around the village. The Icknield Way Path runs through the village on its 110-mile journey from Ivinghoe Beacon in Buckinghamshire to Knettishall Heath in Suffolk. The Icknield Way Trail, a multi-user route for walkers, horse riders and off-road cyclists, passes through the village.

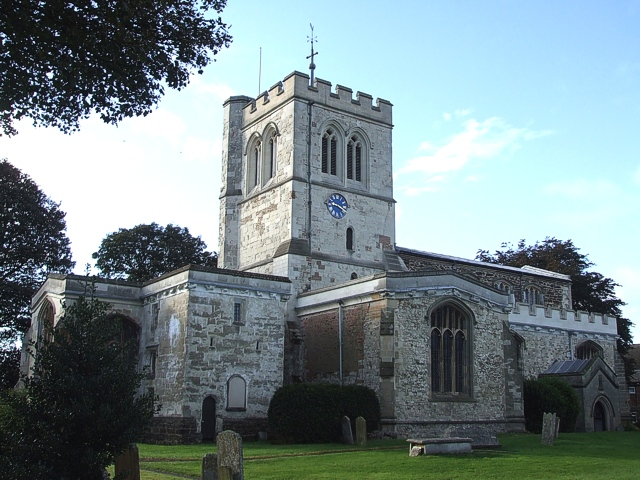
St George's Church

The village has several halls for use by the community. The largest hall is on Leighton Road and managed by the Toddington Village Hall Association. It was opened in July 1993 on behalf of the community.

Toddington has a brass band, the Toddington Town Band (TTB); it has existed in one form or another since 1856 and performs regularly at village events.

It used to be claimed that Toddington had the most pubs per head of population of any village in the United Kingdom, although recently one has closed indefinitely and another was converted into a restaurant. The remaining pubs are: the Oddfellows Arms, the Griffin, the Bell, and the Fancott Arms (which lies about a mile outside the village centre).

Toddington has one theatre - Tads Theatre, on Conger Lane. It is owned and run by the charity group Tads Theatre, formerly known as the Toddington Amateur Dramatics Society. The group mounts 4–6 in-house productions each year, including an annual family pantomime.

Toddington used to have a historical society, the Toddington Historical Society, who met at the Village Hall on Leighton Road.

== Education ==
The village is served by two schools, Toddington St George Church of England School (opened in 1967) and Parkfields Middle School (opened in 1963), which provide education for children aged between 4 and 13 years of age. After year 8, children transfer to Harlington Upper School located in nearby Harlington.

== Historic buildings ==
Toddington Castle was a timber motte-and-bailey castle built before the 13th century in Toddington. Today only earthworks remain of the castle, known as Conger Hill. Chalgrave Castle was built to the south of the village during the 11th century, however no visible remains of the structure exist today.

=== Toddington Manor ===
Toddington Manor is a Tudor Manor house located on the North edge of the village with an extremely long history going back to well before the Norman invasion in 1066. Elizabeth I came to Toddington Manor in 1563 and knighted the owner Henry Cheney. In July 1608 King James and Anne of Denmark stayed at the manor, guests of Jane, Lady Cheney, the queen wore a gown of ash-coloured satin bias cut. Arbella Stuart came in August 1609.

== Notable people ==
Thomas Cleaver, breeder of Sampson, the tallest and heaviest horse ever recorded, lived at Toddington Mills.

Kevin McCloud, presenter of TV show Grand Designs was born and raised in Toddington.

Actor Jack Wild, best known playing the Artful Dodger in Oliver! lived in Toddington.
