= Burcott, Wing =

Hamlet in Buckinghamshire, England

Coordinates: 51.905357°N 0.722988°W

Burcott
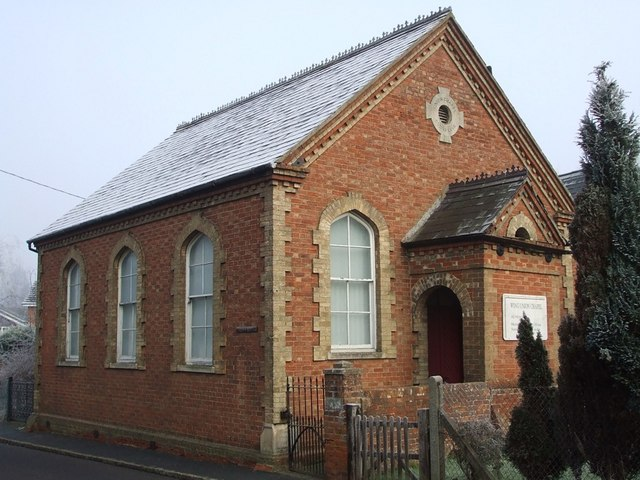
- Wing Union Chapel, on the righthand side of the road to Burcott out of Wing, 2006

- Location within Buckinghamshire
- OS grid reference: SP8723
- Civil parish: Wing
- Unitary authority: Buckinghamshire
- Ceremonial county: Buckinghamshire
- Region: South East
- Country: England
- Sovereign state: United Kingdom
- Post town: LEIGHTON BUZZARD
- Postcode district: LU7
- Dialling code: 01296
- Police: Thames Valley
- Fire: Buckinghamshire
- Ambulance: South Central
- UK Parliament: Aylesbury

Burcott is a hamlet in the civil parish of Wing, in Buckinghamshire, England. Burcott is a common place name in the English language. The place name is Old English and refers to a fortified cottage.

Today the hamlet of Burcott has been almost swallowed up by the growth of Wing, though it is still marked on modern maps, and on the road sign as you enter Wing from the Soulbury road. It is distinguishable by those who know the village well, as being that part of Wing that is on the hill on the north side of the village, separated by an allotment.

Most of the houses in Burcott stand on the "High Street", which is a crescent shaped road that joins Soulbury Road at each end. Ivy Lane and Mount Pleasant Road both branch off the High Street.
