= Geoffrey Unwin =

England international rugby union player

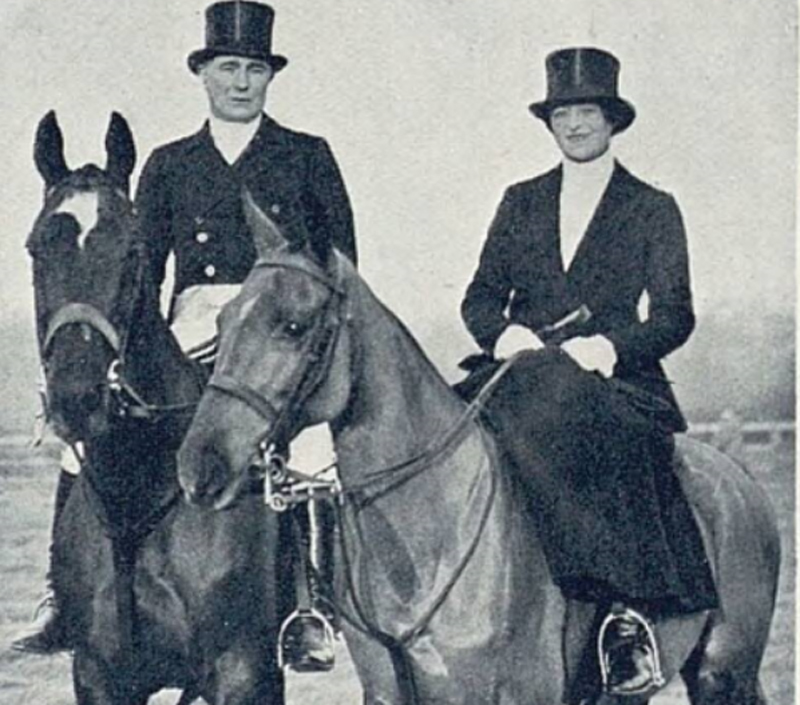
- Geoffrey (left) with wife Dora in 1930
- Full name: Geoffrey Thomas Unwin
- Born: 1 June 1874 Ecclesall Bay, Sheffield, Yorkshire, England
- Died: 12 February 1948 (aged 73) Hemel Hempstead, Hertfordshire, England
- University: Exeter College, Oxford
- Occupation: Brewery director

Rugby union career
- Position: Fly-half
International career
Years	Team	Apps	(Points)
1898	England	1	(0)

Geoffrey Thomas Unwin (1 June 1874 – 12 February 1948) was an English international rugby union player.

== Biography ==
A native of Sheffield, Unwin was educated at the University of Oxford, where he played both rugby union and association football. He captained Oxford University RFC playing as a halfback and was a goalkeeper for Exeter College. After university, he played for Blackheath and Midland Counties as well as representing the South. He captained Cheltenham Rugby Club for many years

Unwin gained his only England cap in 1898, forming a halfback partnership with ex-Cambridge blue Arthur Rotherham, against Scotland at Edinburgh. He also played a match against the touring All Blacks, captaining Cheltenham for many years. He married West End actress, Dora Florence Goddard-Ball (stage name Dora Langham) in August 1912 and the newlyweds moved to Scarborough. Unwin was Joint Master of Stainton Dale Hounds. He was director of Rawson's Brewery, in Sheffield.

Retiring to The Bury, Hemel Hempstead, Unwin died in 1948, at the age of 73.

== See also ==
- List of England national rugby union players
