= Fancott Miniature Railway =

Miniature railway in Fancott, Bedfordshire, England

The Fancott Miniature Railway (FMR) is a 7 1/4 in (184 mm) gauge railway located in the gardens of the Fancott public house in Fancott (near Toddington), Bedfordshire, England. The track is laid in an oval with a triangular junction giving access to the station and with a separate steaming bay inside the oval. There is also a short line off towards a container used as a carriage shed, and a tunnel which contains a short siding for the railway's wagons. The FMR is part of Britain's Great Little Railways.

== History ==
The railway was opened in 1975. In 2015, the pub suffered a fire that damaged the engine sheds, locomotives and carriages. The sheds have since been restored and the rolling stock replaced. As of 2018, the Fancott Miniature Railway was believed to be the only miniature railroad on a pub ground in Britain. However, in 2019 another 7¼" gauge railway opened at the Holly Tree, Forest Gate, London E7, following a refurbishment.

== Locomotives ==
No.1 "Herbie"	Built by Severn Lamb in 1984 (Build No. 1023) with a Honda look-a-like engine providing 6.6HP the engine arrived in 2002 from Southall Light Railway. Herbie was rebuilt in 2016 by Mr D Radcliffe after a fire broke out at the railway destroying Herbie along with the rest of the locomotives at the railway, Herbie returned to traffic 20 March 2017.
No.2 "Pippa"	Built by Mr P Whitmore in 1994, Pippa arrived at the railway around 1998 and was destined for the scrap heap. After some restoration in 2001 Pippa started working trains on the railway and unfortunately in 2015 Pippa was almost completely destroyed in a fire. Pippa is currently being restored by members of the railway and members of Watford Miniature Railway in the hopes it will one day run again.
No.3 "The Phoenix"	Built by members of the Cinderbarrow Miniature Railway in 2007 it contains a 6.6HP engine. Originally named 'Tregoss' the locomotive was renamed in November 2015 when it joined the railway to its current name of 'Phoenix'.
No.4 "Davanna"	Built by David Humphreys in 2013 from a kit produced by Station Road Steam. Davanna arrived at the railway in March 2019 from its previous home at the Fembell Pub, Rochester after it closed down in 2017.
No.D7031 "Dark Star"	Build by Mardyke Miniature Railways in 1989 with a Brigg & Stratton 6.6HP engine, 'Dark Star' was originally named 'Temeraire'. The locomotive arrived at the railway on 8 July 2015 from its previous owners Mr C Gross who undertook the massive task of restoring the locomotive. Since being purchased by the railway, 'Dark Star' is now owned by Ron Stanbridge, manager of the railway.
