= Woodside, Bedfordshire =

Hamlet in Bedfordshire, England

Coordinates: 51.86059°N 0.43962°W

Woodside
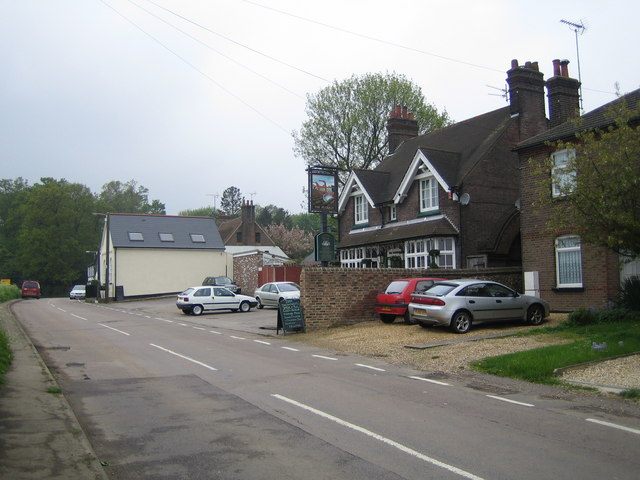
- The Plough, Woodside

- Location within Bedfordshire
- OS grid reference: TL075191
- Civil parish: Slip End
- Unitary authority: Central Bedfordshire
- Ceremonial county: Bedfordshire
- Region: East
- Country: England
- Sovereign state: United Kingdom
- Post town: LUTON
- Postcode district: LU1
- Dialling code: 01582
- Police: Bedfordshire
- Fire: Bedfordshire
- Ambulance: East of England
- UK Parliament: Luton South

Woodside is a hamlet located in the Central Bedfordshire district of Bedfordshire, England.

Located at the junction of Woodside Road and Grove Road, Woodside stands 546 feet (166 m) above sea level. The underlying geology is a Chalk Group known as Lewes Nodular Chalk Formation and Seaford Chalk Formation which was deposited between 84 and 94 million years ago in the Cretaceous Period. The superficial geology is clay with flints, deposited in the Quaternary and Neogene Periods.

It is probable that the settlement was established in the early Middle Ages through clearing the northern end of Caddington Wood by squatters seeking land outside Caddington Manor (hence the name "Woodside" and its linear shape). Most of the settlement stands on higher ground between two parallel valleys. The squatter development of Woodside continued into the sixteenth and seventeenth centuries.

A Baptist Church was established in the settlement in 1862, while St Andrew's Anglican Church was established in Woodside as the "Slip End Mission Church" in 1878.

Today, Woodside forms part of the Slip End civil parish (where the 2011 Civil Parish population was included), and is located directly southwest of the M1 motorway. The motorway acts as the border between Woodside and the large town of Luton.
