= Chalgrave Castle =

South of Bedfordshire

- Toddington, Bedfordshire, England

Site information
- Type: Castle
- Condition: No visible remains

Location
- Shown within Bedfordshire
- Coordinates: 51.9360°N 0.5337°W
- Grid reference: grid reference TL009274

Site history
- Built: c. 1086
- Demolished: 13th century

Chalgrave Castle stood to the south of the large village of Toddington, Bedfordshire.

This was a timber motte and bailey castle, constructed in two phases, built during the 11th century (around 1086). By the 13th century, it had been abandoned.

The site was excavated in 1970, but has since been completely leveled. Nothing visible remains.

== See also ==
- Castles in Great Britain and Ireland
- List of castles in England
