= LU postcode area =

Postcode area within the United Kingdom

Luton
- Postcode area
- Coordinates: 51.896°N 0.501°W
- Country: United Kingdom
- Postcode area: LU
- Postcode area name: Luton
- Post towns: 3
- Postcode districts: 8
- Postcode sectors: 36
- Postcodes (live): 6,225
- Postcodes (total): 10,358
- Statistics as at May 2020

The LU postcode area, also known as the Luton postcode area, is a group of seven postcode districts in England, within three post towns. These cover south Bedfordshire (including Luton, Dunstable and Leighton Buzzard), plus small parts of north Hertfordshire and east Buckinghamshire.

== Coverage ==
The approximate coverage of the postcode districts:

Postcode district	Post town	Coverage	Local authority area(s)
LU1	LUTON	Luton (South), Aley Green, Caddington, Lower Woodside, Pepperstock, Slip End, Woodside	Luton, Central Bedfordshire
LU2	LUTON	Luton (East), Chiltern Green, Cockernhoe, East Hyde, Lawrence End, Lilley, New Mill End, Peters Green, Tea Green, The Hyde, Wandon End, Wandon Green, Winch Hill, London Luton Airport	Luton, Central Bedfordshire, North Hertfordshire
LU3	LUTON	Luton (North), Lower Sundon, Streatley, Sundon	Luton, Central Bedfordshire
LU4	LUTON	Luton (West), Chalton	Luton, Central Bedfordshire
LU5	DUNSTABLE	Dunstable (East including Woodside Estate), Bidwell, Chalgrave, Fancott, Harlington, Houghton Regis (including Townsend Industrial Estate), Thorn, Toddington	Central Bedfordshire
LU6	DUNSTABLE	Dunstable (West), Eaton Bray, Edlesborough, Holywell, Kensworth, Northall, Sewell, Studham, Totternhoe, Whipsnade	Central Bedfordshire, Buckinghamshire
LU7	LEIGHTON BUZZARD	Leighton Buzzard, Bragenham, Briggington, Burcott, Cheddington, Chelmscote, Clipstone, Crafton, Cublington, Eggington, Great Billington, Grove, Heath and Reach, Hockliffe, Horton, Hollingdon, Ivinghoe, Ivinghoe Aston, Ledburn, Leedon, Little Billington, Mentmore, Pitstone, Slapton, Soulbury, Stanbridge, Stewkley, Stockgrove, Tebworth, Tilsworth, Wing, Wingfield	Central Bedfordshire, Buckinghamshire

== Map ==
LU postcode area map, showing postcode districts in red and post towns in grey text, with links to nearby AL, HP, MK and SG postcode areas.

== See also ==
- Postcode Address File
- List of postcode areas in the United Kingdom
