= Whipsnade =

Village in Bedfordshire, England

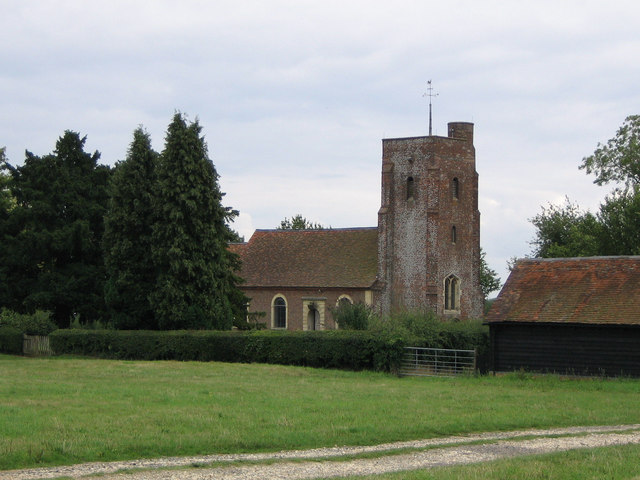
- Church of St Mary Magdelene, Whipsnade (August 2006)

- Location within Bedfordshire
- Population: 455 (parish)
- OS grid reference: TL010179
- Unitary authority: Central Bedfordshire
- Ceremonial county: Bedfordshire
- Region: East
- Country: England
- Sovereign state: United Kingdom
- Post town: DUNSTABLE
- Postcode district: LU6
- Dialling code: 01582
- Police: Bedfordshire
- Fire: Bedfordshire
- Ambulance: East of England
- UK Parliament: Luton South and South Bedfordshire

Whipsnade is a small village and civil parish in Bedfordshire, England. It lies on the eastward tail spurs of the Chiltern Hills, about 2 1/2 miles (4.0 km) south-south-west of Dunstable on the top of the Dunstable Downs, which drop away steeply to the south of the village.

== Etymology ==
Whipsnade is a compound of the Anglo-Saxon personal name, Wibba, with the word "snæd", an area of woodland. Therefore, the name means "Wibba's wood". A variation may be seen as "Wystnade" in a legal record of 1460, where named people in Dunstable were accused of trespassing.

== History ==
The village was first mentioned in a coroner's roll of 1274 when Whipsnade Wood was described as being within the parish of Houghton Regis.

The Old Hunters Lodge at the Crossroads in the village is a Grade II listed building, built in the early 17th Century. It is now a hotel and the only licensed premises outside the ZSL grounds in the village.

Edward John Eyre, explorer of Australia, was born in Whipsnade in 1815.

The parish of Whipsnade used to have a detached part at Ballingdon Bottom, which formed an exclave of Bedfordshire, surrounded by Hertfordshire. The county boundary was changed in 1844, transferring Ballingdon Bottom to Hertfordshire. For parish purposes, it remained a detached part of Whipsnade. When district councils were established in 1894, the main part of Whipsnade parish was included in the Luton Rural District in Bedfordshire, whilst Ballingdon Bottom became part of the Markyate Rural District in Hertfordshire. The parish boundaries were rationalised in 1897 when Ballingdon Bottom was transferred to the parish of Flamstead.

In the 2021 census, the population of Whipsnade was 455.

== Landmarks ==
Whipsnade is home to Whipsnade Tree Cathedral, a 9 1/2 acres (3.8 ha) arboretum planted in the arrangement of a cathedral, and Whipsnade Zoo.

A chalk hill figure of a lion can be found on Bison Hill, created in 1933; it is owned by the zoo. It is the longest hill figure in England at 483 feet (147 m). During the Second World War, the lion was covered with a black tarp to prevent German bomber planes from using it for navigation.

Whipsnade Park Golf Club is also in the vicinity, though it is actually in the neighbouring village of Dagnall, Buckinghamshire.

The local Wildlife Trust manages a small nature reserve north of the village called Sallowsprings (51.8559°N 0.5391°W).

== Education ==
In previous eras Whipsnade was included in a zone with priority admissions for a middle school, but this was no longer the case as of 2025.
