= Hemel Hempstead Rural District =

Former English rural district

Coordinates: 51.754°N 0.475°W

- Rural district
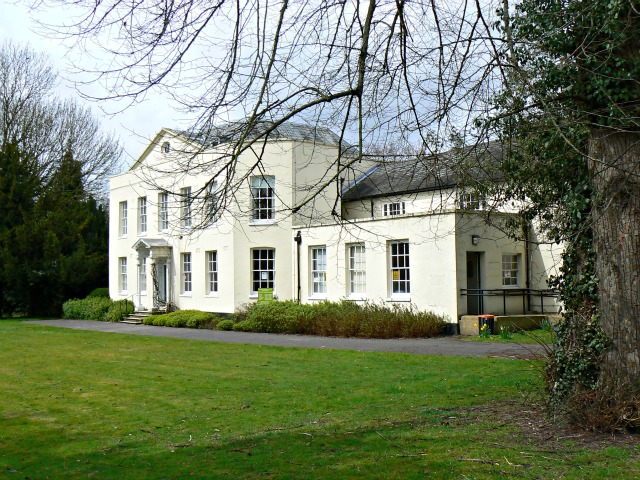
- Council Offices: The Bury, Queensway, Hemel Hempstead
- Population
  - 1901: 6,012
  - 1971: 14,920
- History
  - Created: 28 December 1894
  - Abolished: 31 March 1974
  - Succeeded by: Dacorum
  - HQ: Hemel Hempstead
- Contained within
  - County Council: Hertfordshire

Hemel Hempstead Rural District was a rural district in Hertfordshire, England from 1894 to 1974.

== Evolution ==
The district had its origins in the Hemel Hempstead Rural Sanitary District. This had been created in 1872, giving public health and local government responsibilities for rural areas to the existing boards of guardians of poor law unions. Under the Local Government Act 1894, rural sanitary districts became rural districts from 28 December 1894. The district originally included the town of Hemel Hempstead, but when the town was made a municipal borough in 1898 it was removed from the rural district.

== Parishes ==
The district contained the following civil parishes:

Parish	From	To	Notes
Bovingdon	28 Dec 1894	31 Mar 1974	
Chipperfield	1 Apr 1958	31 Mar 1974	Created from part of Kings Langley.
Flamstead	28 Dec 1894	31 Mar 1974	
Flaunden	28 Dec 1894	31 Mar 1974	
Great Gaddesden	28 Dec 1894	31 Mar 1974	
Hemel Hempstead	28 Dec 1894	7 Jun 1898	Removed from rural district on becoming a municipal borough.
Kings Langley	28 Dec 1894	31 Mar 1974	
Markyate	30 Sep 1897	31 Mar 1974	Parish created on abolition of Markyate Rural District

After Hemel Hempstead itself became a borough, the Hemel Hempstead Rural District district constituted two detached parts, north and south of Hemel Hempstead. Bovingdon, Chipperfield, Flaunden and Kings Langley were in the southern part, with Flamstead, Great Gaddesden and Markyate in the northern part.

== Premises ==
In its early years, the council met at the Union Workhouse on Redbourn Road in Hemel Hempstead. By 1912 the council had moved to offices on the south-west side of the junction of Bury Road, The Broadway, and Marlowes. (Bury Road and The Broadway have since been renamed to both become part of Queensway.) This building was called 1 The Broadway until the 1930s, when it was renamed 2 Marlowes.

In 1954 the council acquired The Bury, a large eighteenth century house on the north side of Bury Road and converted it to become their offices. The council's former offices at 2 Marlowes were demolished shortly afterwards to make way for the Hemel Hempstead College of Further Education (later Dacorum College, now part of West Herts College), which opened in 1962. The council remained based at The Bury until its abolition in 1974.

== Abolition ==
Hemel Hempstead Rural District was abolished under the Local Government Act 1972, becoming part of the district of Dacorum on 1 April 1974.
