= Fancott =

Hamlet in Bedfordshire, England

Coordinates: 51.93929°N 0.51653°W

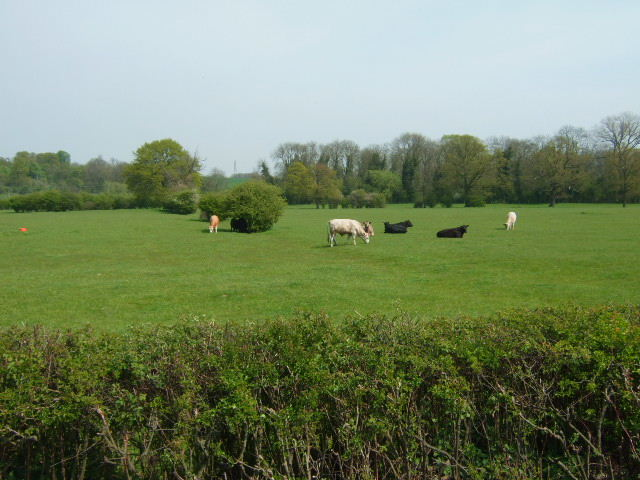
- Cattle grazing at Fancott

- Location within Bedfordshire
- OS grid reference: TL020277
- Civil parish: Toddington
- Unitary authority: Central Bedfordshire
- Ceremonial county: Bedfordshire
- Region: East
- Country: England
- Sovereign state: United Kingdom
- Post town: DUNSTABLE
- Postcode district: LU5
- Dialling code: 01525
- Police: Bedfordshire
- Fire: Bedfordshire
- Ambulance: East of England
- UK Parliament: Mid Bedfordshire

Fancott is a hamlet located in the Central Bedfordshire district of Bedfordshire, England.

The settlement forms part of the Toddington civil parish, and is also close to Chalgrave and Chalton. "The Fancott" public house is situated in Fancott, and is the location of the Fancott Miniature Railway. At the 2011 Census the population of the hamlet was included in the civil parish of Chalgrave
