= Slip End =

Village in Bedfordshire, England

Coordinates: 51.855°N 0.434°W

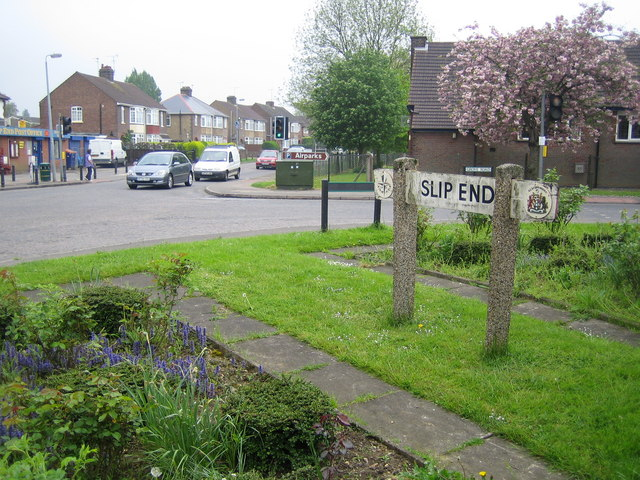
- Slip End village centre

- Location within Bedfordshire
- Population: 1,842
- OS grid reference: TL080185
- Civil parish: Slip End
- Unitary authority: Central Bedfordshire
- Ceremonial county: Bedfordshire
- Region: East
- Country: England
- Sovereign state: United Kingdom
- Post town: LUTON
- Postcode district: LU1
- Dialling code: 01582
- Police: Bedfordshire
- Fire: Bedfordshire
- Ambulance: East of England
- UK Parliament: Luton South and South Bedfordshire
- Website: Parish Council

Slip End is a village and civil parish in Central Bedfordshire, England. The village is very close to Luton. As well as the village of Slip End, the parish contains the hamlets of Lower Woodside, Woodside and Pepperstock. In 2021 it had a population of 1,842.

The name of Slip End possibly has a connection with brickworks. Slip is an old English word for clay and End is a common part of place names in Bedfordshire and not unknown in other counties. End refers to small settlements outside larger villages. It is, therefore, possible that Slip End was named in the early 19th century because of the small number of houses built near the new brickworks in an area not previously developed with the older settlements of Woodside and Pepperstock to either side. Nearby Markyate has a Slype Lane which may or not be connected.

Another plausible explanation is that 'the slip' in fact is a very deep deposit of clay, situated between the stratas of chalk which form the bedrock of Central Bedfordshire. The southerly extremity of the slip terminates at the appropriately named Slip End.

== History ==
The school in Slip End was located towards the Pepperstock end of Front Street and Summer Street, and is now the site of a small development of flats and houses called Old School Walk. It was a board school established as after the Education Act 1870 providing education to all.

The school catered for the whole age range in two sections – juniors and infants – and in 1947 it was extended to 15‑year‑olds. A century after its foundation, the school moved to its present site on Rossway which previously had been clay pits for local brick production. The school is now a primary school, and caters for ages 3 1/2 to 11 years.

The parish was created in 2001 by splitting that of Caddington and Slip End.

The M1 motorway runs adjacent to the village and was officially inaugurated from Slip End. This is celebrated by a large concrete slab on the bridge next to the village with the inscription:

LONDON-YORKSHIRE MOTORWAY
THIS SLAB WAS SEALED BY THE
Rt Hon HAROLD WATKINSON M.P.
MINISTER OF TRANSPORT
INAUGURATION DAY
24th MARCH 1958

== Local amenities ==
The village hall, built circa 1901, has parking for 40 cars and an entertainment licence for 100 for dancing or up to 200 for a meeting.

The Peter Edwards Hall and Playing Fields are situated at the Luton end of the village, next to the church. Facilities include tennis courts and a football pitch.

There are two pubs in the village, "The Rising Sun" on Front Street and the "Frog and Rhubarb" on Church Road.
