= Studham =

Village in Bedfordshire, England

Coordinates: 51.8315°N 0.5169°W

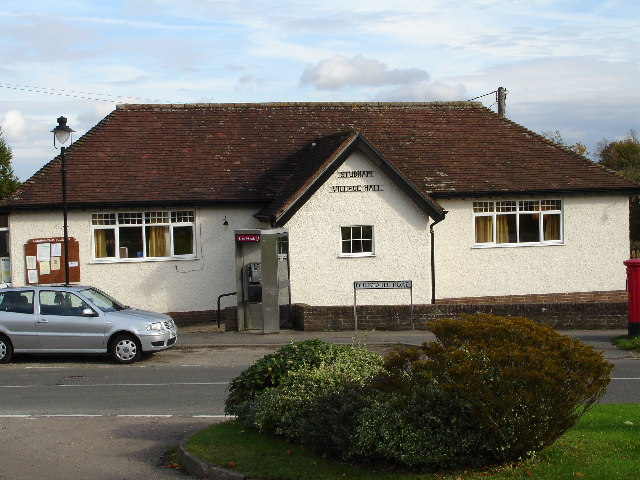
- Studham Village Hall

- Location within Bedfordshire
- Population: 1,182 (parish)
- OS grid reference: TL022157
- Civil parish: Studham
- Unitary authority: Central Bedfordshire
- Ceremonial county: Bedfordshire
- Region: East
- Country: England
- Sovereign state: United Kingdom
- Post town: DUNSTABLE
- Postcode district: LU6
- Dialling code: 01582
- Police: Bedfordshire
- Fire: Bedfordshire
- Ambulance: East of England
- UK Parliament: Luton South and south Bedfordshire

Studham is a village and civil parish in the county of Bedfordshire. It has a population of 1,182. The parish bounds to the south of the Buckinghamshire border, and to the east is the Hertfordshire border. The village lies in the wooded south facing dip slope of the Chiltern Hills. The hamlet of Holywell is located to the north of Studham, and forms part of the same civil parish.

In the Domesday Book of 1086, it was recorded as Estodham. Studham's church celebrated its millennium in 1997.

The ancient parish of Studham straddled the Bedfordshire/Hertfordshire border. It also had a detached part known as Humbershoe which lay to the east of the rest of the parish, which contained the north-western part of the village of Markyate. Humbershoe became a separate civil parish in 1866, and was separated from the ecclesiastical parish of Studham in October 1877 when it was included in the new ecclesiastical parish of St John Markyate Street. In December 1894, under the Local Government Act 1894, the parish of Studham was partitioned into two parts, one on each side of the county border. The Studham (Bedfordshire) parish was included in the Luton Rural District, whilst the Studham (Hertfordshire) parish was included in the Markyate Rural District. The two parishes were re-united as a single parish less than three years later, in September 1897, when the Studham (Hertfordshire) parish was transferred from Hertfordshire to Bedfordshire.

The village currently has two pubs; the older of which, The Bell, is considered to have been in existence before the English Civil War. In the early 20th century, work to make safe the old well in the pub garden revealed discarded or hidden civil war weapons.

In the early evening of 23 May 1948, an ex-RAF Handley Page Halifax, registered G-AIZO, and operated by Bond Air Services Ltd. carrying a cargo of apricots from Valencia, Spain, crashed at Studham.

== Education ==
In previous eras Studham was included in a zone with priority admissions for a middle school, but this was no longer the case as of 2025.
