= Local Government Act 1894 =

Act of the Parliament of the United Kingdom

Local Government Act 1894 (Note: Section 77.)
- Act of Parliament
- Parliament of the United Kingdom
- Long title: An Act to make further provision for Local Government in England and Wales.
- Citation: 56 & 57 Vict. c. 73
- Introduced by: Henry Fowler
- Territorial extent: England and Wales (Note: Section 76.)

Dates
- Royal assent: 5 March 1894
- Commencement: December 1894 (Note: Section 84.)
Other legislation
Amends	Poor Law (Overseers) Act 1814; Vestries Act 1818; Vestries Act 1819; Vestries Act 1831; Poor Law Amendment Act 1834; Highway Act 1835; Parish Notices Act 1837; Poor Law Amendment Act 1842; Poor Law Amendment Act 1844; Vestries Act 1850; Poor Law Amendment Act 1851; Vestries Act 1853; Metropolis Management Act 1855; Metropolis Management Amendment Act 1856; Public Improvements Act 1860; [[[Metropolis Management Amendment Act 1862]]; Union Assessment Committee Act 1862; Metropolitan Poor Act 1867; Poor Law Amendment Act 1867; Poor Law Amendment Act 1868; Public Health Act 1875; Divided Parishes and Poor Law Amendment Act 1876; Elementary Education Act 1876; Metropolitan Commons Act 1878; Municipal Elections (Corrupt and Illegal Practices) Act 1884; Public Health (Members and Officers) Act 1885; Public Libraries Act 1892
Amended by	Local Government Act 1897; Local Government (Joint Committees) Act 1897; Parish Councillors (Tenure of Office) Act 1899; Small Holdings and Allotments Act 1907; Small Holdings and Allotments Act 1908; Representation of the People Act 1918; Housing Act 1925; Rating and Valuation Act 1925; Poor Law Act 1927; Local Government Act 1929; Local Government Act 1933; Public Health Act 1936; Food and Drugs Act 1938; Fire Brigades Act 1938; London Government Act 1939; Local Government Act 1958; Highways Act 1959; Charities Act 1960; London Government Act 1963; Public Libraries and Museums Act 1964; London Government Order 1965; Statute Law (Repeals) Act 1989; Local Government Act 1972; Consumer Credit Act 1974; Statute Law (Repeals) Act 1976; Statute Law (Repeals) Act 1978; Local Authorities (Miscellaneous Provisions) Order 1979; Statute Law (Repeals) Act 1989; Statute Law (Repeals) Act 2004; Charities Act 2006; Charities Act 2006; Regulatory Reform (Game) Order 2007; Levelling-up and Regeneration Act 2023

Status: Partially repealed

Text of statute as originally enacted

Text of the Local Government Act 1894 as in force today (including any amendments) within the United Kingdom, from legislation.gov.uk.

The Local Government Act 1894 (56 & 57 Vict. c. 73) is an act of the Parliament of the United Kingdom that reformed local government in England and Wales outside the County of London. The act followed the reforms carried out at county level under the Local Government Act 1888 (51 & 52 Vict. c. 41). The 1894 legislation introduced elected councils at district and parish level.

The principal effects of the act were:

- The creation a system of urban and rural districts with elected councils. These, along with the town councils of municipal boroughs created earlier in the century, formed a second tier of local government below the existing county councils.
- The establishment of elected parish councils in rural areas.
- The reform of the boards of guardians of poor law unions.
- The entitlement of women who owned property to vote in local elections, become poor law guardians, and act on school boards.

The new district councils were based on the existing urban and rural sanitary districts. Many of the latter had lain in more than one ancient county, whereas the new rural districts were to be in a single administrative county.

The act also reorganised civil parishes, so that none of them lay in more than one district and hence did not cross administrative boundaries.

Although the act made no provision to abolish the hundreds, which had previously been the only widely used administrative unit between the parish and the county in size, the reorganisation displaced their remaining functions. Several ancient hundred names lived on in the names of the districts that superseded them.

== Background ==
The Local Government Act 1888 (51 & 52 Vict. c. 41) had introduced elected county councils. The passing of the act had been part of the price for Liberal Unionist support for Lord Salisbury's minority Conservative administration. An innovation in the act was that all electors had a single vote, and thus county councillors were popularly elected. The members of other local bodies were elected by a system of weighted voting, with those owning more property having multiple votes. The original Local Government Bill of 1888 had included provisions for creating district as well as county councils. However the President of the Local Government Board, Charles Ritchie, had some difficulty in having the legislation passed by Parliament, and dropped the district council clauses for fear that the entire bill might be lost due to opposition from the government's own backbenchers.

The Liberal opposition berated the government for failing to create district councils. At the same time they put forward proposals for establishing councils at parish level. John Morley, MP for Newcastle, told a meeting in Reading:

The Tories cannot conceal from themselves the fact that all over the land – in the towns, in the villages, in the country districts, in the urban districts - there is a resolute determination that Parliament shall put its hand in earnest to the great work of social regeneration ... parish councils may sound dull and mechanical, we know that they will go to the very root of national life, and that when we have achieved these reforms a freer voice will be given to the community than it has ever had before. New depths of life will have been stirred in the most neglected portions of our community, and we shall find among the labourers of the fields, as we have found among the artisans of the towns, a resolution that the condition of our people shall, so far as laws can better it, be bettered ...

The Earl of Kimberley explained to a meeting in Walworth that the party wanted to create:

... a complete hierarchy of councils popularly elected and with full powers belonging to such bodies.

The Liberals tried to amend the Agricultural Smallholdings Act 1892 as it passed through parliament, seeking to add clauses creating parish councils which would have the power to buy and sell land in order to increase the number of smallholdings. In rejecting the amendments, Henry Chaplin, President of the Board of Agriculture, claimed the government intended:

... on a proper and fitting occasion, when opportunity arises, to deal not only with the question of District Councils, but the question also of parochial reform.

Parliament was dissolved in June 1892, and a general election called. The Liberals made the introduction of district and parish councils part of their programme. Following the election the Liberals under William Ewart Gladstone formed an administration with the support of the Irish Parliamentary Party. The Local Government Bill (also referred to as the Parish Councils Bill) was published by H. H. Fowler, the President of the Local Government Board, on 26 March 1893.

== The bill ==
The bill consisted of 71 clauses arranged in five parts. The first part dealt with rural parishes, and provided that:

- Any parish included in a rural sanitary district was deemed a "rural parish".
- Parishes that lay partly in a rural sanitary district and partly in an urban sanitary district; or in more than one administrative county, were to be divided into separate parishes.
- Parishes with a population of 300 or more were to have parish councils. Parishes with a lower population were to be grouped with other parishes so as to reach a population of 300 and have a joint parish council.
- Each parish was to have a parish meeting at which each elector had a single vote on all matters raised.
- Parish councillors would have a one-year term of office, with the old council retiring and the new council coming into office on 15 April.
- Parish councils were to consist of a chairman and councillors. There were to be between five and fifteen councillors, with the number fixed by the county council.
- Nominations to the council were to be made at a parish meeting previous to 15 April, and if there were more candidates than vacancies, a poll was to be held.
- Every parish council was to be a body corporate with perpetual succession. Where there was doubt as to the name of the parish, this was to be fixed by the county council.
- The parish council would be permitted to hold their meetings free of charge in a room in a state-supported public elementary school.
- The parish council was to assume all powers exercised by parish vestries except those dealing with the church or ecclesiastical charities. Examples included the maintenance of closed burial grounds, ownership of village greens and recreation grounds and operation of fire engines.
- A parish council could also take over any property of the poor law guardians within the parish with the approval of the Local Government Board.
- Parish councils could take on powers under various statutes relating to bath houses, street lighting, burials or libraries.
- Parish councils were to have power to buy or receive the gift of land or property to provide any of these services.

The second part of the bill dealt with poor law guardians and district councils. Among its provisions were that:

- There were to be no ex officio or nominated guardians
- Women were to be eligible to be guardians.
- Guardians were to be elected by parish electors on a "one man - one vote" basis.
- Guardians were to have a three-year term of office, with one-third of the board retiring annually. New guardians were to come into office on 15 April.
- Urban sanitary authorities were to renamed "urban district councils", and urban sanitary districts as "urban districts". The titles of municipal boroughs and their town councils, although they ranked as urban districts, were not to be altered, however.
- Rural sanitary authorities were to renamed "rural district councils", and rural sanitary districts as "rural districts".
- The chairman of each district council was to be an ex officio justice of the peace.

The third part of the bill detailed the duties of the county council in dealing with divided areas and small parishes. The county council had the power to name divided parishes and to combine areas. The fourth and fifth parts of the bill dealt with the first election of councils and transitory provisions.

== Passage through Parliament ==
Speaking in the Commons on 21 March 1893, Fowler set out the complicated system of local government that was in need of reform. England and Wales were divided into:

62 counties, 302 Municipal Boroughs, 31 Improvement Act Districts, 688 Local Government Districts, 574 Rural Sanitary Districts, 58 Port Sanitary Districts, 2,302 School Board Districts ... 1,052 Burial Board Districts, 648 Poor Law Unions, 13,775 Ecclesiastical Parishes, and nearly 15,000 Civil Parishes. The total number of Authorities which tax the English ratepayers is between 28,000 and 29,000. Not only are we exposed to this multiplicity of authority and this confusion of rating power, but the qualification, tenure, and mode of election of members of these Authorities differ in different cases.

He explained that the government had chosen the civil parish as the basic unit of local government in rural areas. He estimated that there were approximately 13,000 rural parishes and a decision had been made that all those with a population of 300 or more were to have a parish council. This limit had been chosen as the Local Government Board already possessed powers to group parishes below this population for the election of guardians. There were approximately 6,000 small parishes in this category. Parish councils were to be limited in their expenditure, and were to be confined to charging rates of one penny in the pound unless they had the consent of both the parish meeting and the district council.

Turning to the government of towns he explained:

We shall convert the Improvement Commissioners and Local Boards into Urban District Councils; we shall abolish all plural voting; we shall propose to abolish all qualifications, for we think the only qualification a man ought to possess is the confidence of his constituents; and we propose to make women capable of serving on these District Councils.

He then turned to reform of rural authorities:

Then as regards rural districts, the union is the administrative area with which we have to deal. Except in 25 cases, in which, if I may use the expression, the union consists of a single parish, the union is an aggregation of parishes. There are 648 unions altogether. There are 137 in two counties and 32 in three counties. The Guardians by whom the union is administered are elected or ex officio. The Local Government Board fixes the number of elected Guardians, but there is required to be one Guardian for every constituent parish. There is a property qualification and plural voting, and voting by proxy. We could not ask the House to continue the existing powers in, much less to confer new powers upon, an authority so constituted and so irresponsible ... We therefore propose to abolish, firstly, all ex officio or non-elective Guardians ... there shall be no plural voting, no proxy voting, and no voting papers, but voting by Ballot and One Man One Vote ... Having made the Guardians a popularly elected body, we do not propose to disturb the existing machinery. We take the Rural Sanitary Authority as it now exists, but elected and qualified under new conditions, and we continue that as the Rural District Council. Therefore, the Rural District Council will be the old Rural Sanitary Authority altered, and, I think, very much improved ... Then we propose to abolish all separate Highway Authorities in rural districts and to transfer the whole powers of the Highway Board or the highway parish to the Rural District Council.

Finally he described how the boundaries of the districts and parishes were to be arrived at:

At present we have rural sanitary districts, partly within and partly without the county, and we have parishes partly within and partly without rural sanitary districts. We have 174 rural sanitary districts and some 800 parishes so situate. We propose that every parish is to be within one county, that the district of every District Council is to be within one county, and that the County Councils shall have the duty of readjusting the existing overlapping areas and divisions. We think the County Council far the best tribunal to undertake this duty. They understand the localities, and how the districts can best be divided. They are to have 12 months in which to discharge their duty; and if at the end of that period they have not made this readjustment, it will devolve upon the Local Government Board to interfere and carry the matter out.

The bill returned, in amended form, for a second reading in November 1893. In reintroducing the bill to the Commons, Fowler outlined the objections that had been made, and the government's response.

- The population lower limit of 300 for establishing a parish council was seen as too high. The government proposed lowering the limit to 200, which would create a further 2,000 councils.
- The grouping of small parishes was unpopular. Where parishes were grouped, each parish was to be a separate ward for election of parish councillors, and the separate parish meeting was to retain the power to approve or reject expenditure in its area.
- An impression had been given that the parochial organisation of the Church of England was to be effected. He reaffirmed the fact that only non-ecclesiastical matters were being transferred.
- Objections were made to the election of poor law guardians who were not ratepayers. Fowler pointed out that this was already the case with school boards, town and county councils.

Walter Long, the opposition spokesman on local government attacked the bill on a number of grounds. He defended the ex-officio guardians who had "proved themselves the most efficient and the most useful members of the Board ... you will find that the most regular attendants have been the ex officios, and that they have made the best Chairmen and the best members." He believed the reform of boards of guardians was unwarranted as "the system under which the Poor Law is administered is as admirable as it is possible for the ingenuity and humanity of man to devise", and he called on the government to drop the proposals. Sir Charles Dilke, from the government's own benches, was unhappy that county councils would have the power to divide or group parishes. He felt that they were susceptible to influence by local landowners whose wishes might overcome those of the parishioners.

The bill then entered the committee stage. Arguments over the population at which parish councils should be established continued to be made, with amendments proposing limits of 100, 200, 500, 600 and 1,000. The figure finally reverted to the government figure of 200. Major Leonard Darwin, Liberal Unionist MP for Lichfield unsuccessfully introduced an amendment to create parish councils in urban districts containing more than one parish. After 34 days of debate, the Commons completed its consideration of the bill on 8 January 1894. The passage of the bill through the House of Lords was completed on 12 February. The Lords made two amendments to the bill, the first raised the population for forming a parish council back to the original figure of 300, the second amendment provided that parochial charities would only transfer to the administration of a parish council with the approval of the Charity Commissioners. Both were agreed to. The act was given royal assent on 5 March 1894.

== Urban districts ==
In 1893 there were 688 urban Sanitary districts outside boroughs. These had various titles such as Local Government District or Local Board of Health District or Improvement Commissioners' District. Each of these variously titled entities became urban districts in 1894/5. Urban districts continued to be formed, and by 1927 there were 785.

Municipal boroughs, while being classified as urban districts, had neither their titles nor constitutions altered.

=== Urban district councils ===
The governing body of the area was the urban district council. All councillors were popularly elected for a three-year term. There were to be no ex officio or appointed members as had existed in some of the predecessor bodies. In order to be eligible for election, a candidate was required to be on the electoral register, and to have resided in the district for twelve months prior to the election. Women were permitted to be councillors. One-third of the council was elected on 15 April each year. UDCs could, by a resolution passed with a two-thirds majority, change to a system of elections of the whole council every three years. The council elected a chairman at their annual meeting, who was, during their term of office, a justice of the peace for the county.

== Rural districts ==
There were 574 rural sanitary districts in 1893, many of them crossing county boundaries. The number of rural districts formed by the act was 692. All but three of 118 additional districts were caused by the breaking up of cross-county rural sanitary districts (for example Monks Kirby Rural District was the part of Lutterworth RSD that was in Warwickshire, with the rest forming Lutterworth Rural District.) Where new rural districts were created due to boundary changes the county council were to provide names.

In some areas the county boundaries were so complicated that rural districts were in more than one administrative county. For example, Gloucestershire, Warwickshire and Worcestershire had many outlying detached parishes surrounded by other counties. Accordingly, the rural districts of Shipston on Stour, Stow on the Wold, Tewkesbury and Winchcombe included parishes in two or three counties.

=== Rural district councils ===
Rural district councils consisted of a chairman and councillors. The councillors were elected for a three-year term in a similar way to councillors in urban districts. They were elected for parishes or groupings of parishes, and were also the representatives for those areas on the board of guardians.

==== Parishes administered by a rural district council in another county ====
In a few cases a parish or handful of parishes were administered by a rural district council in a neighbouring county. In this case the area was too small to become a separate rural district, which was required by the act to have at least five councillors. These areas were to "be temporarily administered by the district council of an adjoining district in another county with which it was united before the appointed day". The councillors elected for these areas were entitled to sit and act as members of the rural district council, although separate accounts were to be kept for the area. These arrangements were usually ended within a few years of the act's coming into force, with the areas being transferred by alteration in either county or rural district boundaries. Some persisted until the 1930s, however, when county districts were reorganised under the Local Government Act 1929. Exceptionally, the parish of Pennal, Merionethshire, was administered by Machynlleth Rural District in Montgomeryshire until 1955.

==== Powers ====
Rural district councils inherited the powers of both the rural sanitary authority they replaced and any highway board in their area.

== Parish councils and meetings ==
In all rural parishes with a population of 300 or more, a parish council had to be elected. In parishes with more than 100 but less than 300 population, the parish meeting could request the county council to make an order to establish a parish council. Urban parishes (those within an urban district) were not given separate parish councils, but were directly administered by their urban district council or municipal borough council.

The membership of a parish council varied from 5 to 15 members, the number being fixed by order of the county council. The entire council was elected annually on 15 April. To be eligible for election to the council, a person was required to be resident within the parish, or within three miles of it, for at least twelve months prior to the election. The entire council was elected annually. The parish council elected a chairman at its annual meeting.

=== Powers and duties ===
The parish councils were given the following powers and duties:

- Appointment of overseers of the poor
- Maintaining and repairing closed churchyards
- Holding or maintaining parish property (including village greens, allotments, recreation grounds) for the benefit of the inhabitants
- Election of allotment managers
- The power to adopt, following a poll of the parish electors:
  - The Lighting and Watching Act 1833 and the Baths and Washhouses Acts 1846 to 1882
  - The Burials Act 1852 to 1885
  - The Public Improvements Act 1860
  - The Public Libraries Act 1892
- Acquisition of buildings for parish purposes
- Acquisition of land for allotments, public walks and recreation grounds

=== Expenditure and borrowing ===
Parish councils were generally limited to a rate of three pence in the pound, although this could be increased to sixpence in the pound with the permission of the parish meeting. Loans could not be obtained without the permission of both the parish meeting and the county council. Borrowing for certain specified purposes was subject to the approval of the Local Government Board.

=== Rights of way ===
No right of way could be extinguished or diverted without the permission of both the parish and rural district council. Parish councils could take over the maintenance of public footpaths within their parish, other than those along the edge of highways.

=== Charitable trusts ===
Where a charitable trust (other than an ecclesiastical charity) existed in a parish, the Charity Commissioners could provide for the parish council to become the trustees. Annual accounts of the charity were to be laid before the parish meeting.

=== Parish wards ===
A parish council, or one-tenth of the electors of a parish, could apply to the county council for the division of the parish into wards. This was to be done where "the area or population of the parish is so large, or different parts of the population so situated, as to make a single parish meeting for the election of councillors impracticable or inconvenient, or that it is desirable for any reason that certain parts of the parish should be separately represented on the council". Separate elections of councillors for each ward would then be held.

== Boundaries ==
The responsibility for defining the areas of the districts was given to the county councils established in 1888.

County councils were supposed to have regard to areas of existing sanitary districts and parishes in the administrative county, and to ensure that no parish or district extended into another county. Also parishes that crossed district boundaries were to be divided.

Hundreds of orders were made by county councils, and it was not until 1898 that the process was complete. Many county councils took the opportunity to "tidy up" their boundaries with neighbouring authorities, and it was not uncommon for blocks of parishes to be exchanged.

The division of parishes led to many ancient parishes being split into "urban" and "rural" portions. As an example, an order of the Hertfordshire County Council split the parishes of Bushey and Watford into Bushey Urban and Watford Urban parishes in Watford Urban District and Watford Rural and Bushey Rural parishes in the Watford Rural District.

The county council could also group small parishes under a joint parish council.

== First elections and "appointed day" ==
The act specified that the first elections to the district councils and reconstituted boards of guardians would take place on 8 November 1894, or such other date that the Local Government Board should fix. In the event, the electoral register was not complete until late November, and elections did not take place until December. Over 729,000 women were now eligible to vote in local elections in England and Wales (some of whom could already vote in local elections under the Municipal Corporation (Elections) Act 1869).

All rural parishes were instructed to hold their first parish meeting on 4 December 1894. Nominations for parish councillors were made on that date, with many parish councils being agreed by a show of hands at that first parish meeting. Where formal elections were demanded for parish councils they were held on (or about) 17 December, with the exact date being fixed by the relevant county council. Elections to urban and rural district councils, and for urban poor law guardians took place on the same date as those for parish councils. There were no elections in 1895, with the electoral cycle beginning on 15 April 1896.

The Local Government Board issued circulars declaring the appointed day for the coming into office of the newly elected authorities:

- Parish councils where no election was required following the parish meeting: 13 December 1894
- Parish councils where there was an election: 31 December 1894
- Boards of guardians and rural district councils: 28 December 1894
- Urban district councils: 31 December 1894

== London ==
The act did not apply to the County of London for most provisions. Anomalously the Woolwich Local Board continued to exist, whereas in the rest of England local boards of health become urban district councils as part of the act. However, the act did regulate elections to the London vestries with the first elections under the new system taking place on 15 December 1894. Further elections for a third of members were to take place every year from March 1896. The reform of poor law guardian elections also applied to London with the first election taking place on 17 December 1894.

== Amendments 1896–1899 ==
Following the coming into force of the act, a number of difficulties arose in its practical application. This led to the passing of four short acts to modify particular aspects:

Local Government (Elections) Act 1896 (Note: Section 3.)
- Act of Parliament
- Parliament of the United Kingdom
- Long title: An Act to continue temporarily certain Powers for the Removal of Difficulties at Elections under the Local Government Act, 1894.
- Citation: 59 & 60 Vict. c. 1
- Territorial extent: United Kingdom

Dates
- Royal assent: 6 March 1896
- Commencement: 6 March 1896 (Note: The Acts of Parliament (Commencement) Act 1793.)
- Expired: 31 December 1897
- Repealed: 1 June 1934
Other legislation
Amended by	Poor Law Act 1927
Repealed by	Local Government Act 1933

Status: Repealed

Text of statute as originally enacted

- The Local Government (Elections) Act 1896 gave county councils the power to make appointments to any district or parish council or board of guardians where elections were found to be defective, or had not been held. This power was temporary, ending on 31 December 1897.

Local Government (Elections) (No. 2) Act 1896 (Note: Section 2.)
- Act of Parliament
- Parliament of the United Kingdom
- Long title: An Act to prevent certain Disqualifications for Elections to Parish Councils of 1896.
- Citation: 59 & 60 Vict. c. 4
- Territorial extent: United Kingdom

Dates
- Royal assent: 27 March 1896
- Commencement: 27 March 1896
- Repealed: 21 December 1908
Other legislation
Repealed by	Statute Law Revision Act 1908

Status: Repealed

Text of statute as originally enacted

- The Local Government (Elections) (No. 2) Act 1896 eased the residency requirements for the parish council elections of 1896. Instead of having to live in the parish for twelve months prior to the elections, all qualified electors resident at 25 March 1895 could be candidates.

Local Government Act 1897 (Note: Section 4.)
- Act of Parliament
- Parliament of the United Kingdom
- Long title: An Act to amend the Law as to Qualifications for Elections to Parish Councils and as to the Annual Assembly of the Parish Meeting.
- Citation: 60 & 61 Vict. c. 1
- Territorial extent: United Kingdom

Dates
- Royal assent: 16 February 1897
- Commencement: 16 February 1897
- Repealed: 1 April 1934
Other legislation
Amends	Local Government Act 1894
Repealed by	Local Government Act 1933

Status: Repealed

Text of statute as originally enacted

- The Local Government Act 1897 made the qualification date of 25 March of the previous year applicable to all future elections. It also allowed for the annual meeting of authorities to be held on any date between 1 March and 1 April inclusive.

Parish Councillors (Tenure of Office) Act 1899 (Note: Section 3.)
- Act of Parliament
- Parliament of the United Kingdom
- Long title: An Act to enable Parish Councillors to hold Office for Three Years.
- Citation: 62 & 63 Vict. c. 10
- Territorial extent: England and Wales

Dates
- Royal assent: 20 June 1899
- Commencement: 1 January 1900 (Note: Section 1(1).)
- Repealed: 1 April 1934
Other legislation
Amends	Local Government Act 1894
Repealed by	Local Government Act 1933

Status: Repealed

Text of statute as originally enacted

- The Parish Councillors (Tenure of Office) Act 1899 changed the term of office of parish councillors from one to three years. Elections were to be held on 15 April 1901 and then every three years. The annual meeting of the parish council was to be held within seven days of 15 April.

== Subsequent developments ==
Section 25(7) of the act was repealed by section 1(1) of, and part VIII of schedule 1 to, the Statute Law (Repeals) Act 1976, which came into force on 27 May 1976.

== List of parishes split in the wake of the 1894 Act ==
The old parish of...	...in the county of...	...was split into...	...within...	...and into...	...within...
Abingdon St Helen		Abingdon	Abingdon MB	St Helen Without	Abingdon RD
Bangor	Carnarvonshire	Bangor	Bangor MB	Pentir	Ogwen RD
Brecon				St David Without	
Caddington		Caddington (Beds)	Luton Rural District	Caddington (Herts)	Markyate RD
Chepping Wycombe		Chepping Wycombe Urban		Chepping Wycombe Rural	
Chesham				Ashley Green	Amersham RD
Chesham				Chartridge	Amersham RD
Chesham				Latimer	Amersham RD
Clewer		Clewer Within	New Windsor MB	Clewer Without	Windsor RD
Criccieth	Carnarvonshire	Criccieth	Criccieth UD	Penllyn	Lleyn Rural District
Dwygyfylchi	Carnarvonshire	Dwygyfylchi	Penmaenmawr UD	part of Conwy	Conwy MB
Eton				Eton Wick	Eton Rural District
Eynesbury		Eynesbury		Eynesbury Hardwicke	
Fletton		Fletton Urban		Fletton Rural	
Gyffin	Carnarvonshire	Gyffin	Conwy MB	Llechwedd	Conwy Rural District
Holyhead		Holyhead Urban		Holyhead Rural	
Kempston		Kempston Urban	Kempston UD	Kempston Rural	Bedford RD
Latchford		Latchford	Warrington CB	Latchford Without	Runcorn RD
Llanbeblig	Carnarvonshire	Llanbeblig	Carnarvon MB	Waunfawr	Gwyrfai RD
Llaniestyn (Anglesey)		Llaniestyn Urban	Beaumaris MB	Llaniestyn Rural	Aethwy RD
Llanllechid	Carnarvonshire	Bethesda	Bethesda UD	Llanllechid	Ogwen RD
Llanrhos	Carnarvonshire	Llanrhos	Conwy MB	Eglwysrhos	Llandudno UD
Llanrhos	Carnarvonshire	Llanrhos	Conwy MB	Penrhyn	Conwy RD
Luton		Luton	Luton MB	Hyde	Luton RD
Luton		Luton	Luton MB	Leagrave	Luton RD
Luton		Luton	Luton MB	Limbury	Luton RD
Luton		Luton	Luton MB	Stopsley	Luton RD
Marlow		Great Marlow			
Peterborough		Peterborough Within		Peterborough Without	
Royston		Royston (Cambs)	Melbourn RD	Royston (Herts)	Ashwell RD
St Neots		St Neots Urban	St Neots UD	St Neots Rural	St Neots RD
Studham		Studham (Beds)	Luton RD	Studham (Herts)	Markyate RD
Wokingham		Wokingham	Wokingham MB	Wokingham Without	Wokingham RD

== See also ==
- Elections in the United Kingdom
- List of rural districts in England and Wales 1894–1930
- Reform Acts
- Women's suffrage in the United Kingdom
