= List of schools in Central Bedfordshire =

This is a list of schools in Central Bedfordshire, a unitary authority in the English county of Bedfordshire.

== State-funded schools ==
=== Primary and lower schools ===
- Ardley Hill Academy, Dunstable
- Ashton St Peters CE Primary School, Dunstable
- Aspley Guise Lower School, Aspley Guise
- Beaudesert Lower School, Leighton Buzzard
- Beecroft Academy, Dunstable
- Biggleswade Academy, Biggleswade
- Caddington Village School, Caddington
- Caldecote CE Academy, Upper Caldecote
- Campton Academy, Campton
- Chalton Lower School, Chalton
- Clifton All Saints Academy Clifton
- Clipstone Brook Lower School, Leighton Buzzard
- Cranfield CE Academy, Cranfield
- Derwent Lower School, Henlow
- Dovery Academy, Leighton Buzzard
- Dunstable Icknield Lower School, Dunstable
- Dunton CE Lower School, Dunton
- Eaton Bray Academy, Eaton Bray
- Eversholt Lower School, Eversholt
- Everton Heath Primary School, Everton
- Fairfield Park Lower School, Fairfield
- The Firs Lower School, Ampthill
- Flitwick Lower School, Flitwick
- Gothic Mede Academy, Arlesey
- Gravenhurst Academy, Gravenhurst
- Greenfield and Pulloxhill Academy, Greenfield/Pulloxhill
- Greenleas School, Leighton Buzzard
- Hadrian Academy, Dunstable
- Harlington Lower School, Harlington
- Hawthorn Park Community Primary, Houghton Regis
- Haynes Lower School, Haynes
- Heathwood Lower School, Leighton Buzzard
- Hockliffe Lower School, Hockliffe
- Houghton Conquest Lower School, Houghton Conquest
- Houghton Regis Primary School, Houghton Regis
- Husborne Crawley Lower School, Husborne Crawley
- John Donne CE Primary School, Blunham
- Kensworth CE Academy, Kensworth
- Kingsmoor Lower School, Flitwick
- Laburnum Primary School, Sandy
- Lancot School, Dunstable
- Langford Village Academy, Langford
- Lark Rise Academy, Dunstable
- Lawnside Academy, Biggleswade
- Leedon Lower School, Leedon
- Linslade Lower School, Linslade
- Maple Tree Primary School, Sandy
- Marston Moreteyne School, Marston Moreteyne
- The Mary Bassett Lower School, Leighton Buzzard
- Maulden Lower School, Maulden
- Meppershall CE Academy, Meppershall
- Moggerhanger Primary School, Moggerhanger
- Northill CE Academy, Northill
- Potton Primary School, Potton
- Pulford CE Lower School, Leighton Buzzard
- Ramsey Manor Lower School, Barton-le-Clay
- Raynsford CE Academy, Henlow
- Ridgmont Lower School, Ridgmont
- Robert Peel Primary School, Sandy
- Roecroft Lower School, Stotfold
- The Rushmere Park Academy, Leighton Buzzard
- Russell Lower School, Ampthill
- St Andrew's CE Lower School, Biggleswade
- St Augustine's Academy, Dunstable
- St Christopher's Academy, Dunstable
- St Leonard's VA Lower School, Heath and Reach
- St Mary's CE Academy, Stotfold
- St Mary's CE Lower School, Clophill
- St Mary's RC Primary School, Caddington
- St Swithun's CE Primary School, Sandy
- St Vincent's RC Primary School, Houghton Regis
- Shefford Lower School, Shefford
- Shelton Lower School, Lower Shelton
- Shillington Lower School, Shillington
- Silsoe CE Lower School, Silsoe
- Slip End Village School, Slip End
- Southcott Lower School, Linslade
- Southill Lower School, Southill
- Stanbridge Lower School, Stanbridge
- Stondon Lower School, Stondon
- Studham Village CE Academy, Studham
- Sundon Lower School, Sundon
- Sutton CE Lower School, Sutton
- Swallowfield Lower School, Woburn Sands
- Templefield Lower School, Flitwick
- Thomas Johnson Lower School, Lidlington
- Thomas Whitehead CE Academy, Houghton Regis
- Thornhill Primary School, Houghton Regis
- Tithe Farm Primary School, Houghton Regis
- Toddington St George CE School, Toddington
- Totternhoe CE Academy, Totternhoe
- The Vale Academy, Dunstable
- Watling Lower School, Dunstable
- Westoning Lower School, Westoning
- Woburn Lower School, Woburn
- Wrestlingworth CE Lower School, Wrestlingworth

=== Middle schools ===
- Alameda Middle School, Ampthill
- Arnold Academy, Barton-le-Clay
- Biggleswade Academy, Biggleswade
- Brooklands Middle School, Leighton Buzzard
- Edward Peake VC CE Middle School, Biggleswade
- Etonbury Academy, Arlesey
- Fulbrook Middle School, Woburn Sands
- Gilbert Inglefield Academy, Leighton Buzzard
- Henlow CE Academy, Henlow
- Holywell Middle School, Cranfield
- Leighton Middle School, Leighton Buzzard
- Linslade School, Linslade
- Parkfields Middle School, Toddington
- Pix Brook Academy, Stotfold
- Priory Academy, Dunstable
- Robert Bloomfield Academy, Shefford
- Woodland Middle School Academy, Flitwick

=== Secondary and upper schools ===
- All Saints Academy, Dunstable
- Cedars Upper School, Leighton Buzzard
- Etonbury Academy, Arlesey
- Harlington Upper School, Harlington
- Houstone School, Houghton Regis
- Manshead CE Academy, Caddington
- Queensbury Academy, Dunstable
- Redborne Upper School and Community College, Ampthill
- Samuel Whitbread Academy, Shefford
- Sandy Secondary School, Sandy
- Stratton Upper School, Biggleswade
- Pix Brook Academy, Stotfold
- Priory Academy, Dunstable
- Vandyke Upper School, Leighton Buzzard

=== Special and alternative schools ===
- The Academy of Central Bedfordshire, Houghton Regis
- The Chiltern School, Dunstable/Houghton Regis
- Ivel Valley School, Biggleswade
- Oak Bank School, Leighton Buzzard
- Weatherfield Academy, Dunstable

=== Further education ===
- Central Bedfordshire College
- Shuttleworth College

== Independent schools ==
=== Primary and preparatory schools ===
- Orchard School and Nursery, Barton-le-Clay

=== Senior and all-through schools ===
- OneSchool Global UK, Biggleswade
- OneSchool Global UK, Dunstable

=== Special and alternative schools ===
- Esland Bedford School, Silsoe
