= Transport in Luton =

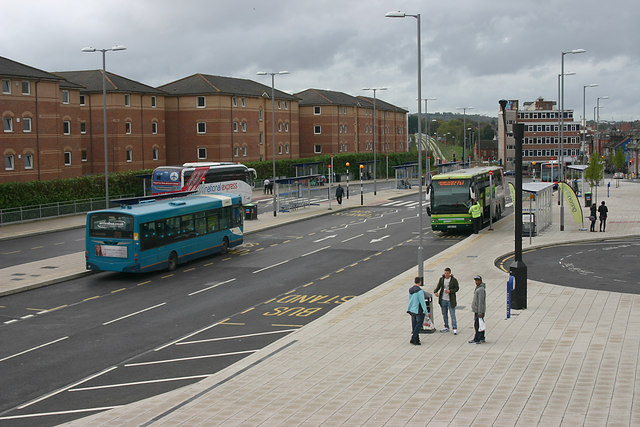
Buses and coaches at Luton Station Interchange

Luton is a town in the United Kingdom less than 30 miles (50 km) north of the centre of London, and has good transport links via the motorway network and the National Rail system. Luton is also home to Luton Airport, one of the major feeder airports for London and the southeast. The town is also served by buses run by Arriva Herts & Essex and other operators and has a guided busway. As a Unitary Authority, Luton Borough Council is responsible for local highways and public transport in the borough.

== Road ==
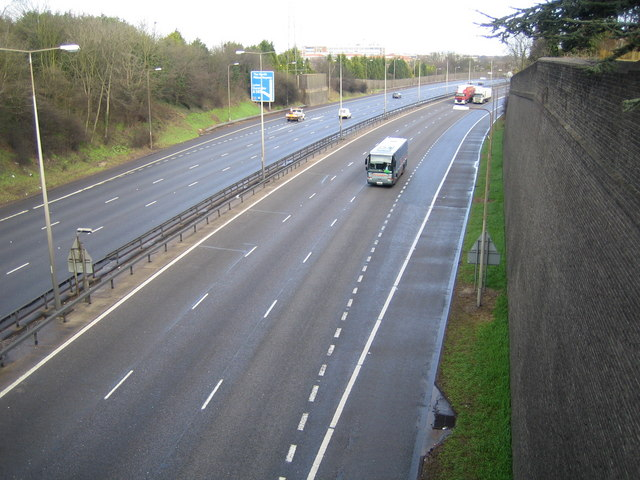
Junction 11 on the M1, one of two junctions for Luton.

Luton is served by the M1 Motorway (London-Leeds), the A6 (Luton-Carlisle) and the A505 (Sawston-Leighton Buzzard). Nearby settlements accessible by the road network include Milton Keynes and St Albans (via the M1), Bedford (via the A6), and Dunstable, Leighton Buzzard and Hitchin (via the A505).

== Rail ==
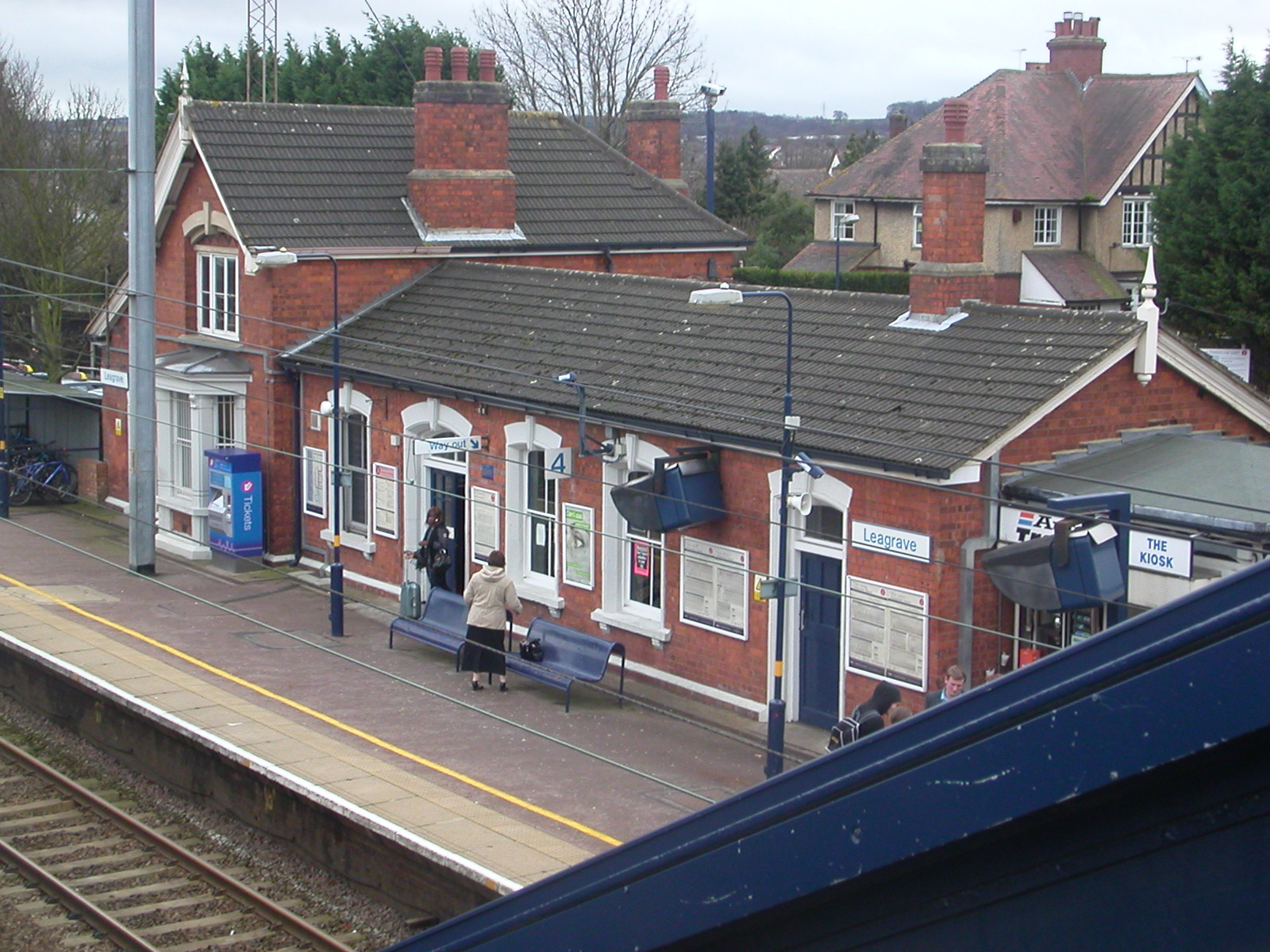
Leagrave railway station

Luton is served by three railway stations on the Midland Main Line: Luton, Luton Airport Parkway and Leagrave.

As of January 2023, Govia Thameslink Railway runs the Thameslink route north to Bedford and south to Brighton, Three Bridges and Rainham via central London stations. There are limited peak time services to East Grinstead, Orpington and Sutton.

East Midlands Railway operates semi-fast "EMR Connect" services between London St Pancras and Corby, calling at Luton and Luton Airport Parkway. They also operate limited services to Melton Mowbray, Nottingham and Sheffield from these stations.

== Bus and coach services ==
Bus services are primarily operated by Arriva Herts & Essex, Centrebus and Grant Palmer. A number of longer distance coach services operate from Luton Station Interchange and the Luton Airport bus station.

=== Luton to Dunstable Busway ===
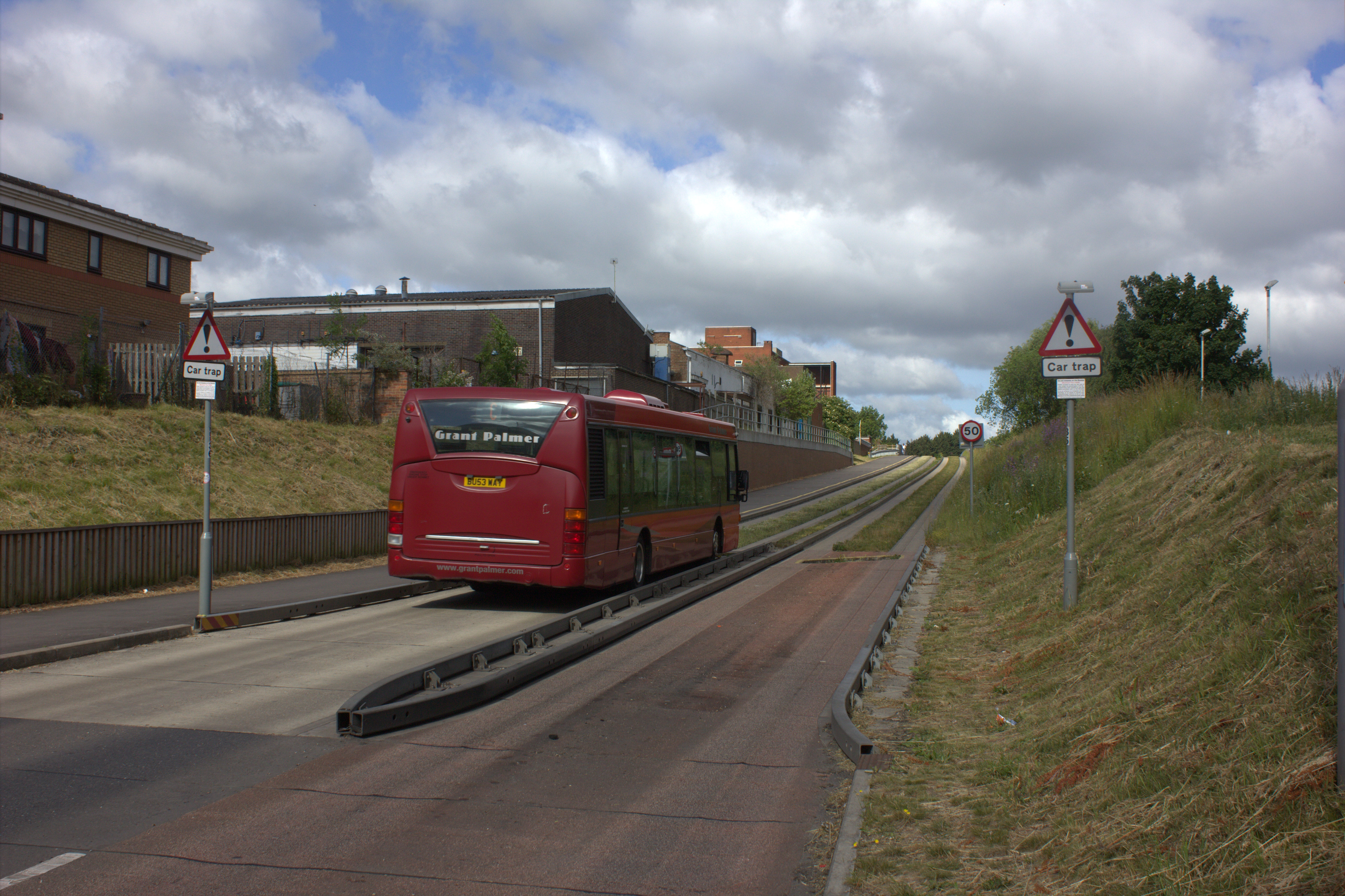
The Luton to Dunstable Busway, opened in 2013

The Luton to Dunstable Busway is a guided bus connecting Dunstable, Houghton Regis and Luton with Luton Airport. The guided busway runs for 13.4 kilometres (8.3 miles) and was opened in September 2013.

== Luton Airport ==
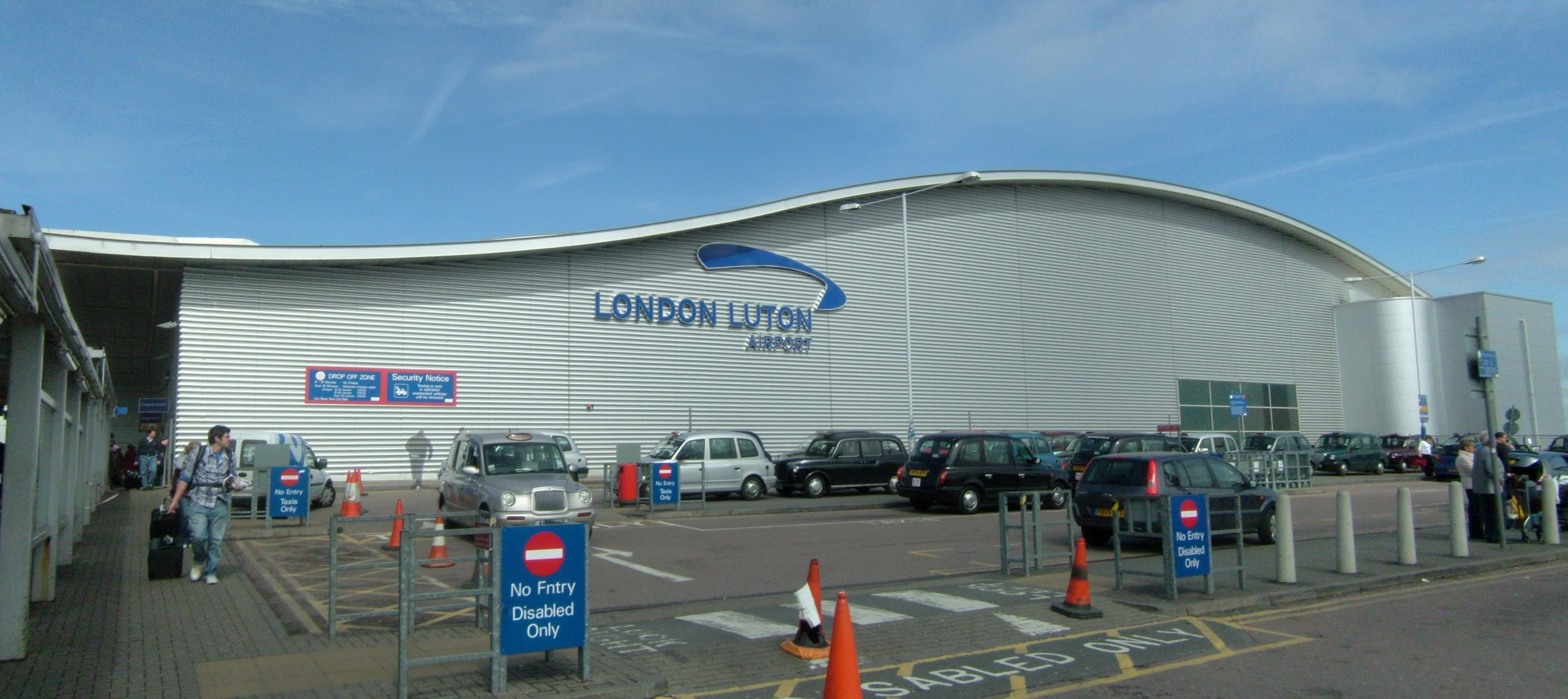
Luton Airport

Luton Airport is 2 mi (3.2 km) from Junction 10 of the M1 and is the fourth-largest airport serving the London area, after Heathrow, Gatwick and Stansted, and is one of London's six international airports along with London City Airport and London Southend Airport. The airport is a hub for EasyJet, TUI Airways and Ryanair.

=== Luton DART ===
A, automated people mover/light rail transit line links Luton Airport with Luton Airport Parkway. It opened in March 2023 and, after an initial trial run, will provide a 24-hour service to and from the airport. It is expected to open 24 hours per day three weeks later.
