= Luton to Dunstable Busway =

Public transport system in Bedfordshire, England

Busway
- Luton to Dunstable Busway

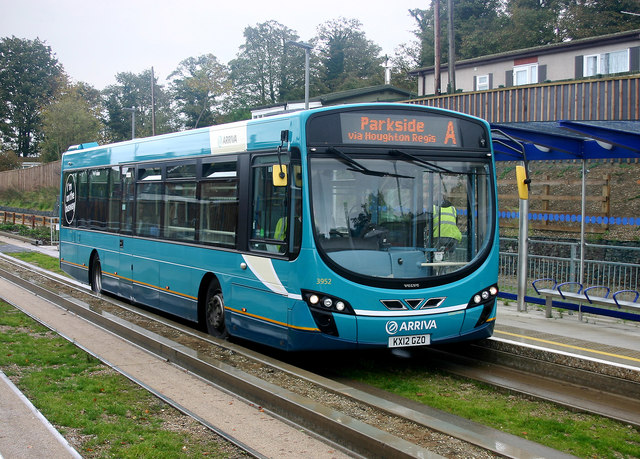
- Bus at Stanton Road bus stop, Luton

Overview
- Began service: 24 September 2013

Route
- Start: Luton Airport
- Via: Luton
- End: Houghton Regis
- Timetable: CB Travel Choices
- Map: Route map
Route map
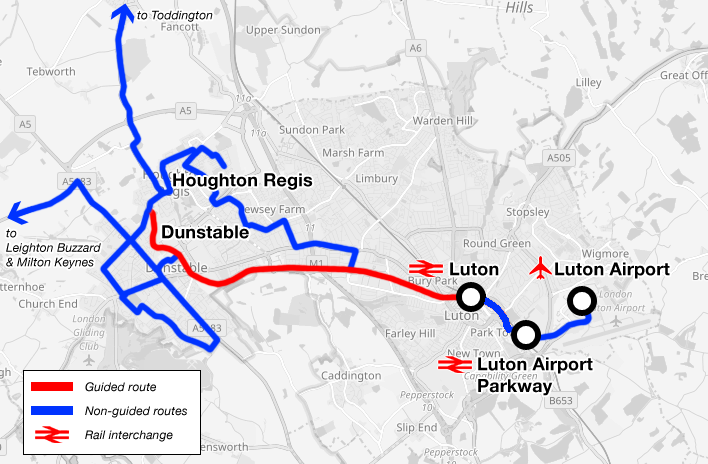

The Luton-Dunstable Busway is a guided busway system in Bedfordshire, England, which connects the towns of Dunstable, Houghton Regis and Luton with Luton Airport. It was built on the route of a disused railway track and opened in September 2013. The busway runs parallel to the A505 (Dunstable Road) and A5065 (Hatters Way) for 13.4 kilometres (8.3 mi), of which 7.7 kilometres (4.8 mi) is guided track with a maximum speed of 50 mph. It is claimed to be the second longest busway in the world.

== History ==
Various studies had been carried out since 1989 which examined options for solving transit problems in the Luton/Dunstable Urban Area, including British Rail's Network SouthEast Plan published in May 1989. Bedfordshire County Council considered a number of possible schemes, which involved reopening or repurposing the former Dunstable Branch Lines, a disused railway line which had been closed to passenger traffic in 1967 under the Beeching cuts. One proposal was re-opening the railway to create a branch line of the Midland Main Line, to run Thameslink heavy rail services from Luton to Dunstable. This electrified, single-track route would have presented several challenges, in particular the lack of connection to the main line at Luton, which would have necessitated the construction of a grade-separated junction to the south of Luton Airport Parkway. An alternative heavy rail scheme was also evaluated, to reopen the line as a separate single-track route with passing loops, operated by a diesel-powered shuttle train service. Another proposal was to convert the line to segregated, twin-track light rail operation, with on-street operation on extensions to Houghton Regis and to Luton Airport.

A guided bus scheme was also considered, which would involve lifting the railway track and converting the trackbed to a segregated guided busway. This proposal was found to have particular advantages: it would be cost considerably less than the rail-based schemes, and the ability of buses to leave the busway and join the existing road network at designated points would allow better transport penetration of suburban areas. In 1996, the guided bus scheme was selected as the most cost-effective option.

Following local government reorganisation, the unitary authority of Luton Borough Council assumed control from Bedfordshire County Council in 1997, and took over the lead role in the busway project. A process of ongoing consultations, grant applications and a public enquiry delayed the project by several years.

Luton Borough Council's early announcements for the Busway indicated that it would be designed as a bus rapid transit system named Translink Expressway, operated with a fleet of articulated buses of the Phileas type, along part of the former Dunstable Branch Lines.

Historical Busway route

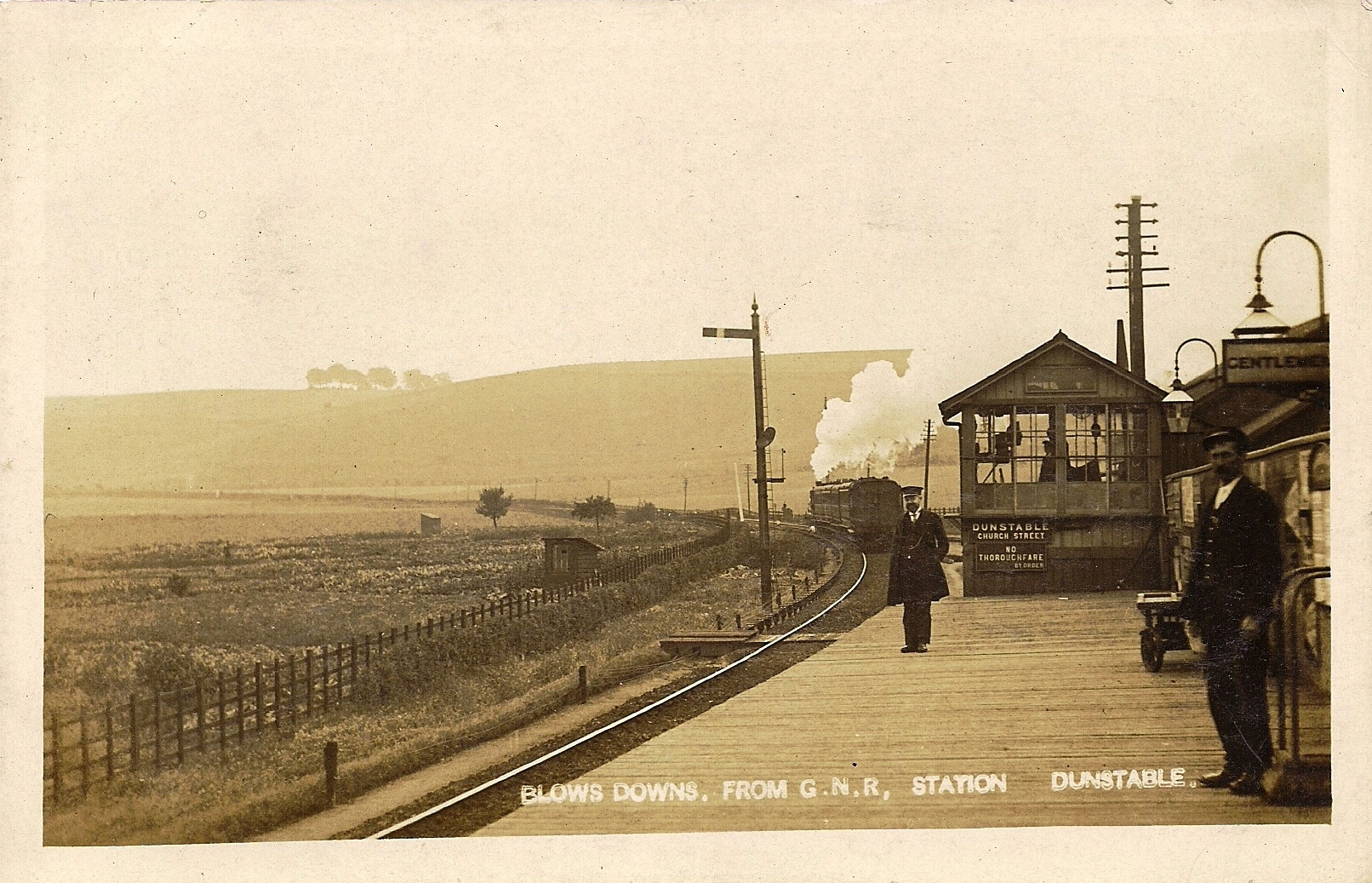
Dunstable Town railway station in the 1900s, closed in 1965

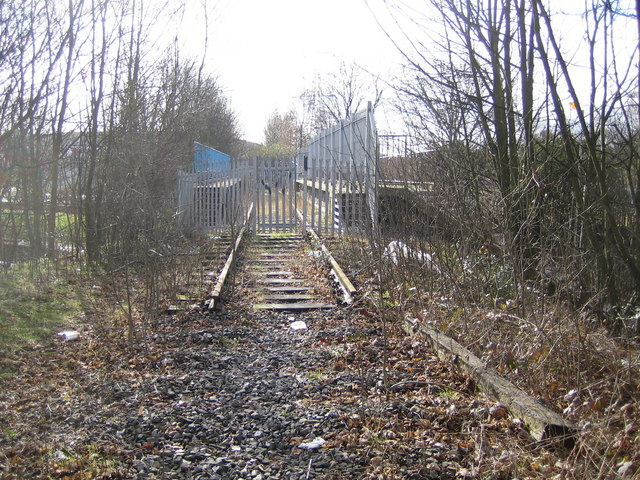
Disused railway near Church Street, Dunstable, prior to track removal (2006)

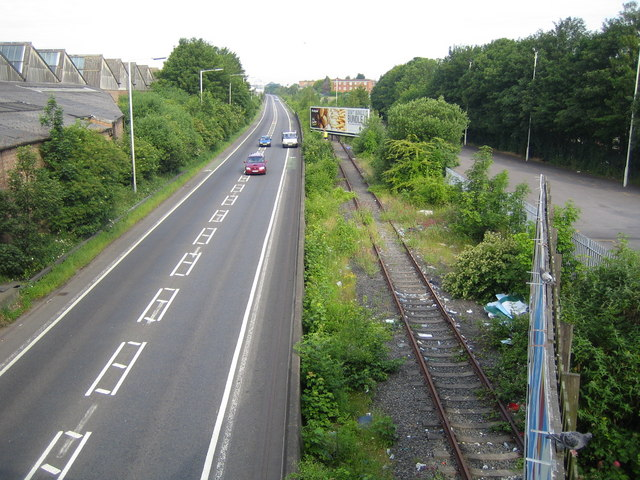
Disused railway track alongside Hatters Way at Clifton Road (2006)

2009 map showing the planned conversion of the railway route (green) to guided Busway

After 20 years of planning, the Busway took three years to construct, at a cost of £91 million. It was originally budgeted at £51 million, but costs increased due to underground utilities, soil contamination and the removal of Japanese knotweed. Design and construction was carried out by Arup and Parsons Brinckerhoff, including seven new bridges, and reconstruction of three bridges, bus stops and a new transport interchange at Luton Railway Station. The bulk of funding for the scheme came from the central government, with additional funds from Luton Borough Council and Central Bedfordshire Council, with additional section 106 contributions from developers. The Busway was opened 24 September 2013, five months later than scheduled, by Norman Baker MP, a Minister for Transport. The Busway took over approximately 7.7 miles (12.4 km) of the former railway line. Some remaining sections of disused railway were converted into pedestrian and cycling rail trail routes, with National Cycle Route 6 now following the line north-west between Dunstable and Stanbridgeford (via the Sewell Cutting nature reserve), and a southern section between from Welwyn Garden City to Wheathampstead now forming the Ayot Greenway.

Two new bus stops were added to the Busway system in early 2016 to serve the Chaul End area of Luton and Townsend Farm Road, near Houghton Regis.

== Features ==
Busway infrastructure

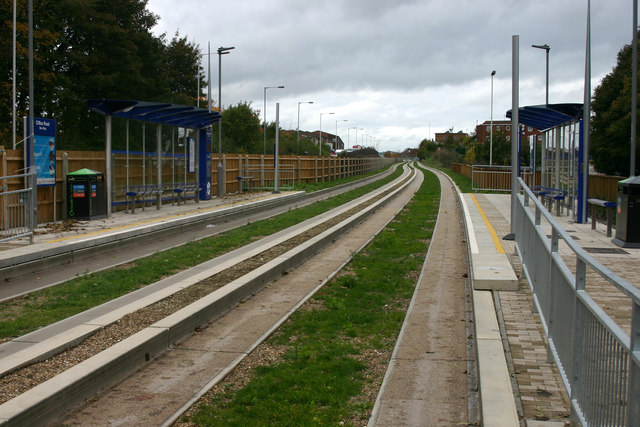
The concrete rollway track

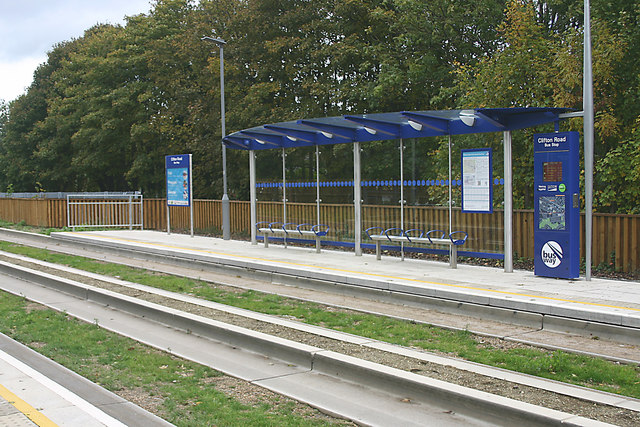
A stop on the Busway at Clifton Road

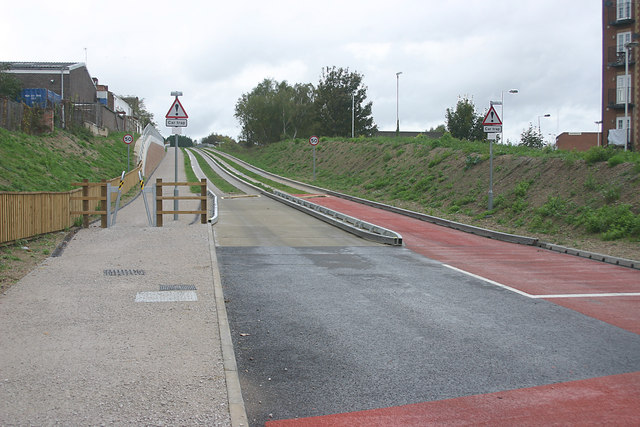
Modal junction of concrete rollway and tarmac highway

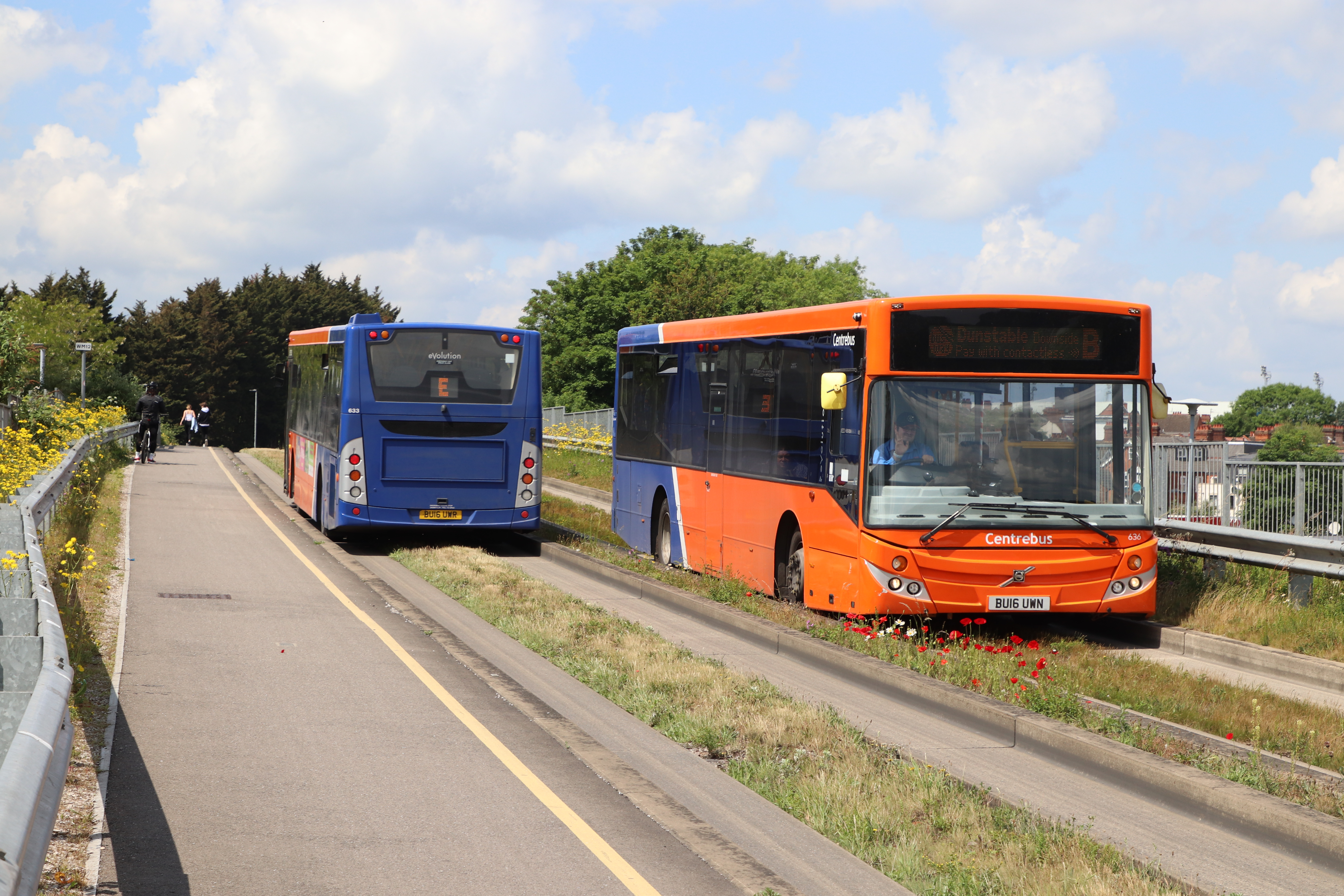
Buses pass on the Busway alongside a pedestrian path

The 7.7-mile (12.4 km) guided section is a rollway built from concrete beams. Standard buses that have been fitted with two small guide wheels can join the track and travel along it at speeds of up to 50 miles per hour (80 km/h). Because it is a segregated route, other vehicles are prohibited from using the Busway. "Car traps" have been installed near junctions with the public highways to prevent motorists from using the route.

== Services ==
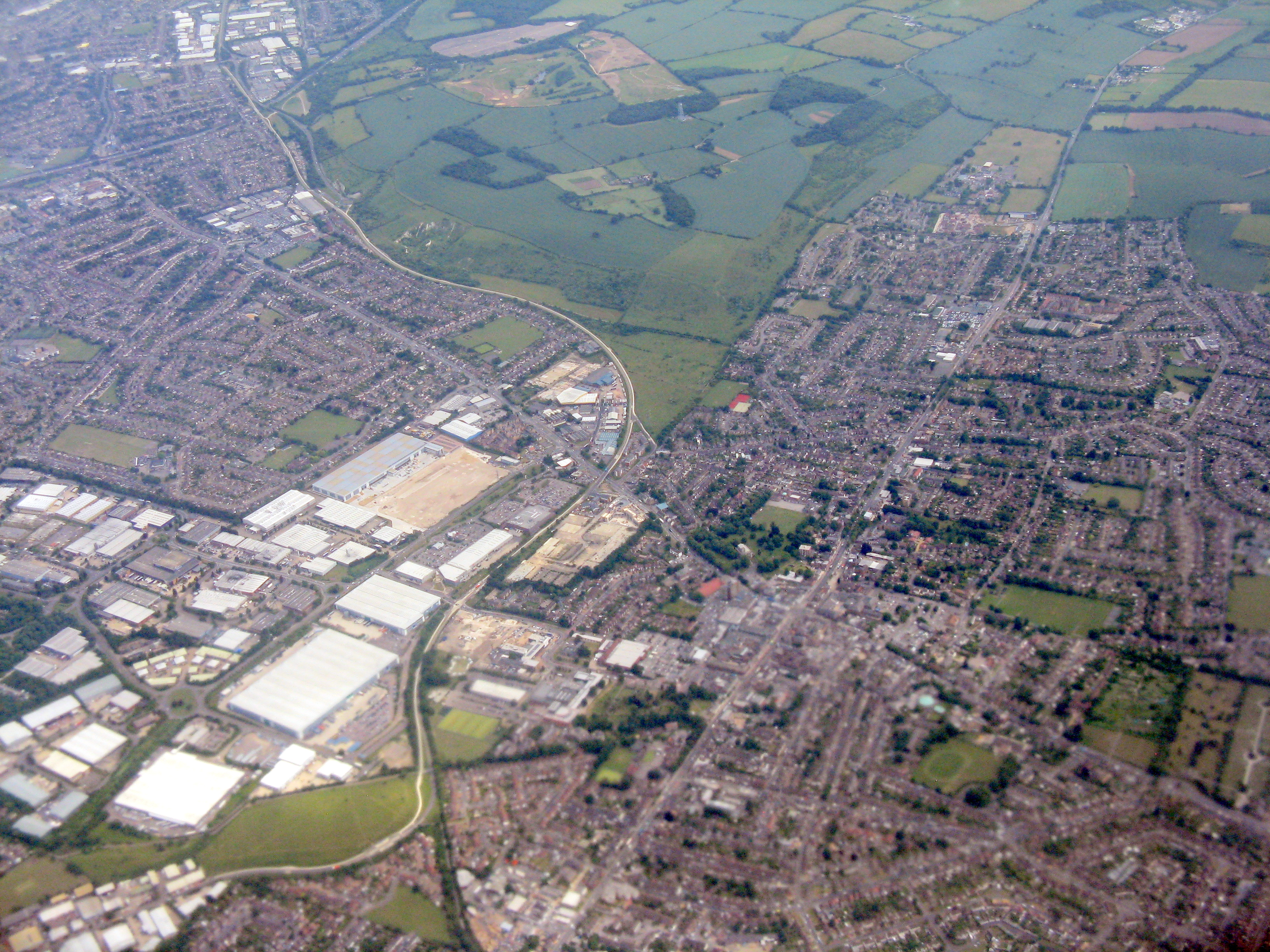
Aerial photograph of the Busway in Dunstable

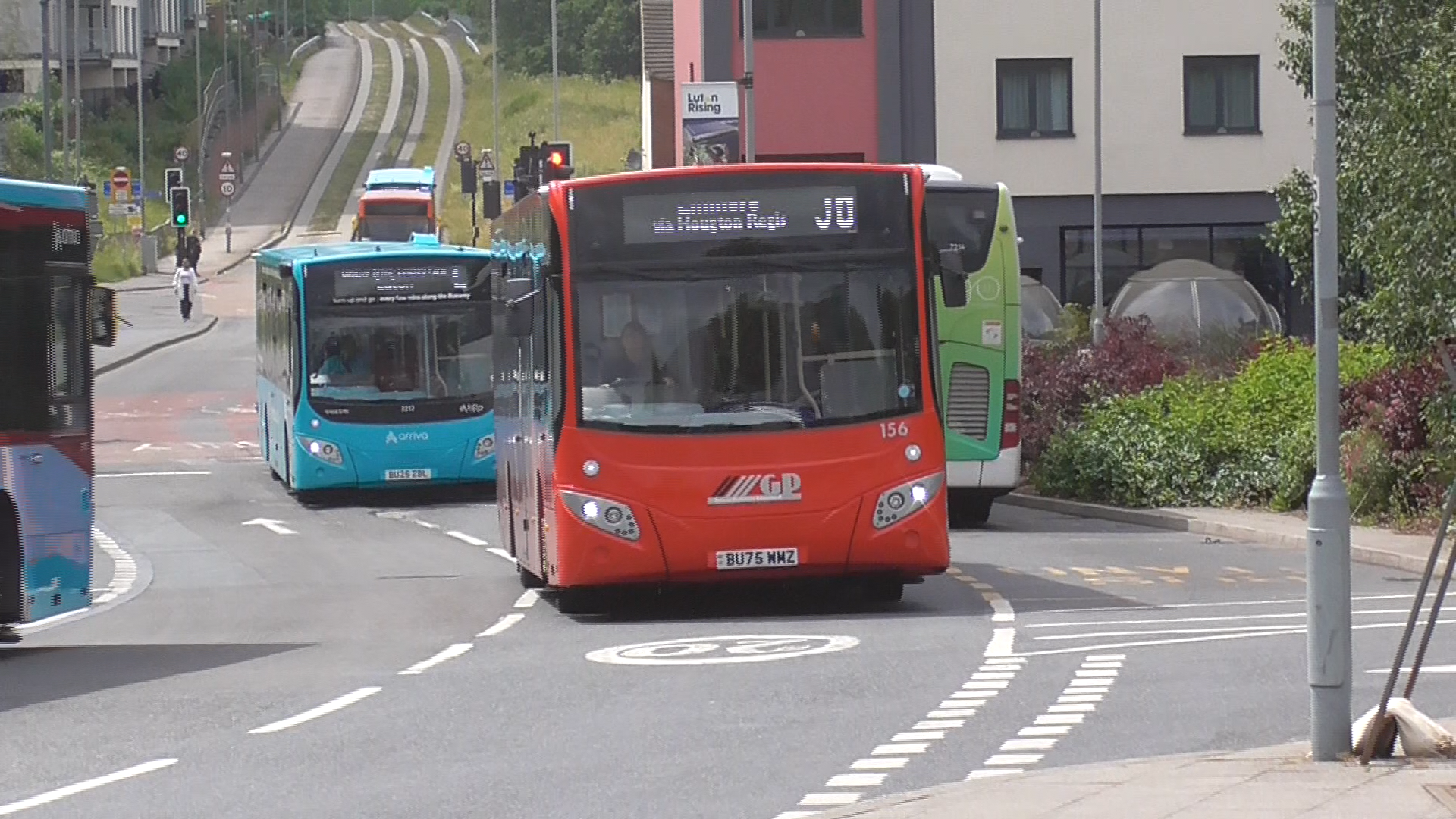
A Route Jo guided bus (registration BU75 WMZ) operated by Grant Palmer in street running mode in Luton town centre.

In accordance with the requirements of bus deregulation, bus services on the Luton to Dunstable Busway are operated by private bus companies: Arriva, Centrebus and Grant Palmer. Initially at peak times upon opening (services A, B, C, E), buses ran up to every seven minutes.

Busway Routes & Destinations
Route	Start	End
Route A	Luton Airport, Luton Station Interchange, clockwise via Dunstable, Houghton Regis, L&D Hospital	Luton Airport
Route B	Downside, Dunstable	Luton Station Interchange
Route C	Beecroft, Dunstable	Luton Station Interchange
Route CS1	Cedars Upper School	Luton Station Interchange
Route CX	White Lion Retail Park, Dunstable	Luton Station Interchange
Route E	Harlington	Luton Station Interchange
Route H	Dunstable, Thorn	Luton Station Interchange
Route Hi	Thorn	Luton Station Interchange
Route Jo	Linmere, Houghton Regis	Luton Station Interchange
Route L	Linmere	Luton Station Interchange
Route MK1	Milton Keynes Central, Clifton Road, Luton Station Interchange, Luton Airport, Wigmore, Luton Station Interchange	Bedford
Route W	White Lion Retail Park, Dunstable	Luton Station Interchange
Route X1	Milton Keynes Central	Luton Airport
Route X2	Milton Keynes Central	Luton Airport
Route X3	Milton Keynes Central	Luton Airport
Route X4	Aylesbury	Luton Airport
Route Z	Luton Airport, Luton Station Interchange, anticlockwise via L&D Hospital, Houghton Regis, Dunstable	Luton Airport

== Incidents ==
There have been incidents involving buses on the Busway, including a bus becoming accidentally "derailed" from the concrete rollway, and buses moving at speed colliding with stationary buses.

A number of fatal accidents involving pedestrians have occurred on the Busway. In February 2019, a pedestrian was struck by a bus and later died of his injuries around 4:00 a.m. near Hatters Way, and in January 2020, a 69-year-old man was hit by a bus travelling towards Dunstable at the Jeans Way bus stop, being pronounced dead at the scene. Following an inquest into this accident by the chief coroner in January 2021, Luton Borough Council were condemned for the lack of safety fencing and signage that allowed the man to freely access the busway.

== Future expansion ==
Local politicians in Central Bedfordshire Council and Luton Borough Council have remarked on the lack of connection to main line railway services at the western end of the busway, and have advocated extending Busway services to Leighton Buzzard railway station, 5.8 miles (9.3 km) west of Houghton Regis. This extension would provide interchange with West Coast Main Line rail services, and a link to Luton Airport.

== See also ==
- Other busway systems
- Hertfordshire Essex Rapid Transit (HERT)
