= Weatherfield Academy =

Coordinates: 51.888°N 0.542°W

Location
- Brewers Hill Road; Dunstable, Bedfordshire, LU6 1AF; England

Information
- Type: Special school; Academy
- Department for Education URN: 137896 Tables
- Ofsted: Reports
- Headteacher: J. Selmes
- Gender: Mixed
- Age: 7 to 19
- Enrolment: 152 as of January 2019
- Houses: Owls, Kestrels, Swallows
- Colours: Yellow, Blue, Red
- Website: http://www.weatherfield.beds.sch.uk/

Weatherfield Academy (formerly Weatherfield School) is a mixed special school located in Dunstable, Bedfordshire, England. The school accepts pupils from all over the Central Bedfordshire area.

The school is for pupils whose special educational needs are categorised as Moderate Learning Difficulties. The school educates children aged 7 – 19

Facilities at Weatherfield include a school farm, IT suites, CDT department, Food economics department, and a science laboratory.

In February 2011, Central Bedfordshire Council submitted proposals to merge Weatherfield with Glenwood School and Hillcrest School over the three sites in Dunstable and Houghton Regis. However, after consultation with pupils, staff and parents, Weatherfield was not included in the merger, and was converted to academy status instead. Glenwood School and Hillcrest School merged to form The Chiltern School in 2012.
