= Trust PA =

British spinal cord injury charity

Trust PA is a UK registered charity working to help those suffering from paralysis as a result of a spinal cord injury (SCI), funding research, as well as the work necessary to convert successful research into properly tested and approved treatments that can be freely available in UK NHS hospitals and across the world.

Other projects include the Head Up campaign, promoting ways to avoid SCI in rugby, as a result of which the International Rugby Board and UK rugby unions now include guidance in their training materials, and the Trust PA Buddy scheme, a volunteering scheme to promote better care for vulnerable hospital patients.

Trust PA is run by a voluntary committee and has no paid staff. In its first eight years, Trust PA issued grants totaling over a third of a million pounds.

It was established in 2002 in memory of Cardiff born Paul-André Blundell (known to his friends as P.A.) who, during an away rugby match for Keynsham RFC in September 2001, sustained a SCI leaving him instantly paralysed from the chin down and unable to breathe for himself. Thanks to resuscitation from a medically trained teammate, he survived and was airlifted to hospital. He underwent five months of rehabilitation at a specialist unit at Salisbury District Hospital, but then unexpectedly died from a pulmonary embolism in January 2002, aged 26.

== Patrons ==
Mountaineer Sir Chris Bonington is Honorary President, and actors Ioan Gruffudd, Matthew Rhys and Neil Jackson are patrons.
