= South Midlands =

Region of England

Coordinates: 52.1°N 0.8°W

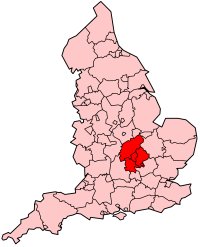
- Country: United Kingdom
- Constituent country: England
- Region: East Midlands (part); East of England (part); South East England (part)
- Counties: Bedfordshire; Buckinghamshire (northern parts); Northamptonshire
- Counties included in some definitions: Cambridgeshire; Gloucestershire; Herefordshire; Leicestershire (southern parts); Norfolk; Oxfordshire; Suffolk; Warwickshire (southern parts)
- Time zone: UTC+0 (Greenwich Mean Time)
  - Summer (DST): UTC+1 (British Summer Time)

The South Midlands is an area of England which includes Northamptonshire, the northern parts of Buckinghamshire and Oxfordshire and the western part of Bedfordshire. Unlike the East Midlands or West Midlands, the South Midlands is not one of the NUTS statistical regions of the United Kingdom.

== An early definition ==
The 1851 census defined a South Midland division which comprised Middlesex (except the Metropolitan portion), Hertfordshire, Buckinghamshire, Oxfordshire, Northamptonshire, Huntingdonshire, Bedfordshire and Cambridgeshire.

To understand why the South Midland division extends so far south, it may help to know that some 19th-century geographers defined a Central Plain consisting of the middle parts of England, lying between the valleys of the River Trent and the River Thames to the north and south, and between the Fen district and the high ground bordering the valley of the River Severn to the east and west.

== Milton Keynes and South Midlands growth area ==
In 2008, the Government referred to an area centred on the City of Milton Keynes as the Milton Keynes and South Midlands growth area. This area comprises the whole of Bedfordshire, the whole of Northamptonshire, and parts of Buckinghamshire (the City of Milton Keynes and other parts of north Buckinghamshire). It straddles the boundaries of other regions of England, including portions of the East Midlands, East of England and South East England.

The main settlements are Aylesbury, Milton Keynes, Northampton, Corby, Kettering, Wellingborough, Rushden, Bedford and Luton. A report in 2002 found that: "The most successful economies are those of Milton Keynes and Northampton. Bedford, Corby and the Luton/Dunstable/Houghton Regis area are in need of regeneration." The region is served by London Luton Airport (the fifth busiest airport in the United Kingdom), and has important road and rail links, being served by the M1 motorway and both the West Coast and East Coast main lines, connecting it with London, Birmingham and the north of England.

== Other examples ==
- The Council for British Archaeology South Midlands region covers Bedfordshire, Buckinghamshire, Northamptonshire and Oxfordshire.
- The English Powerlifting Association South Midlands district covers the counties of Oxfordshire, Berkshire, Buckinghamshire, Hampshire, and the Isle of Wight.
- The Pagan Federation South Midlands district covers Bedfordshire, Buckinghamshire, Hertfordshire, Northamptonshire and Oxfordshire.
- The South Midlands League was formed by football teams from Bedfordshire and some adjoining counties.
- The South Midlands Korfball Association covers korfball competitions and teams in Bedfordshire, Buckinghamshire, Hertfordshire, Northamptonshire and the London Borough of Harrow.
- The South Midlands Authorities covers the authorities of the Borough of Bedford, Central Bedfordshire, Luton, Milton Keynes City, North Northamptonshire, and West Northamptonshire.
  - The proposed South Midlands Combined Authority covers the authorities of the Bedford, Central Bedfordshire, Luton, Milton Keynes City, North Northamptonshire, and West Northamptonshire.

== Gallery ==
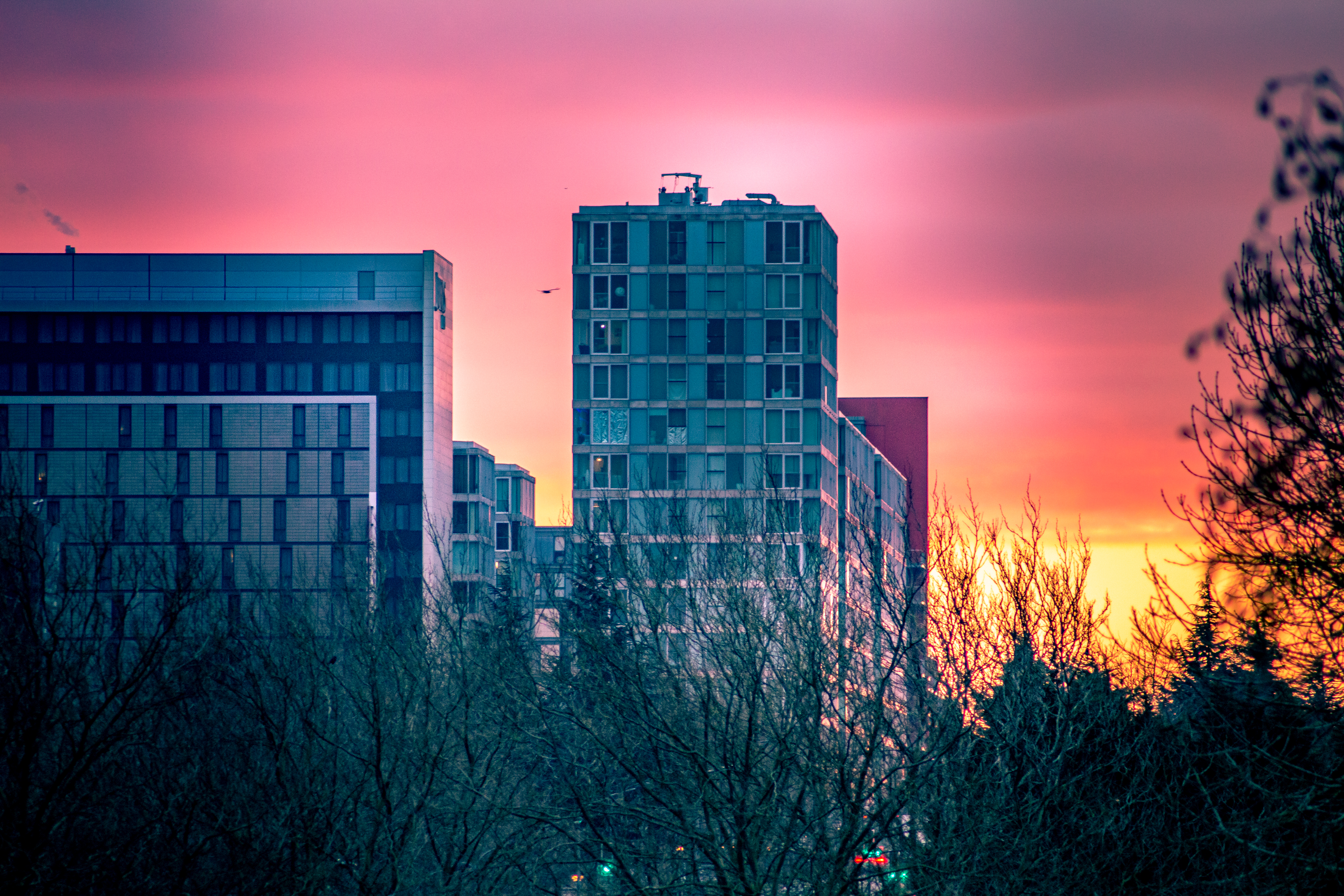
Milton Keynes

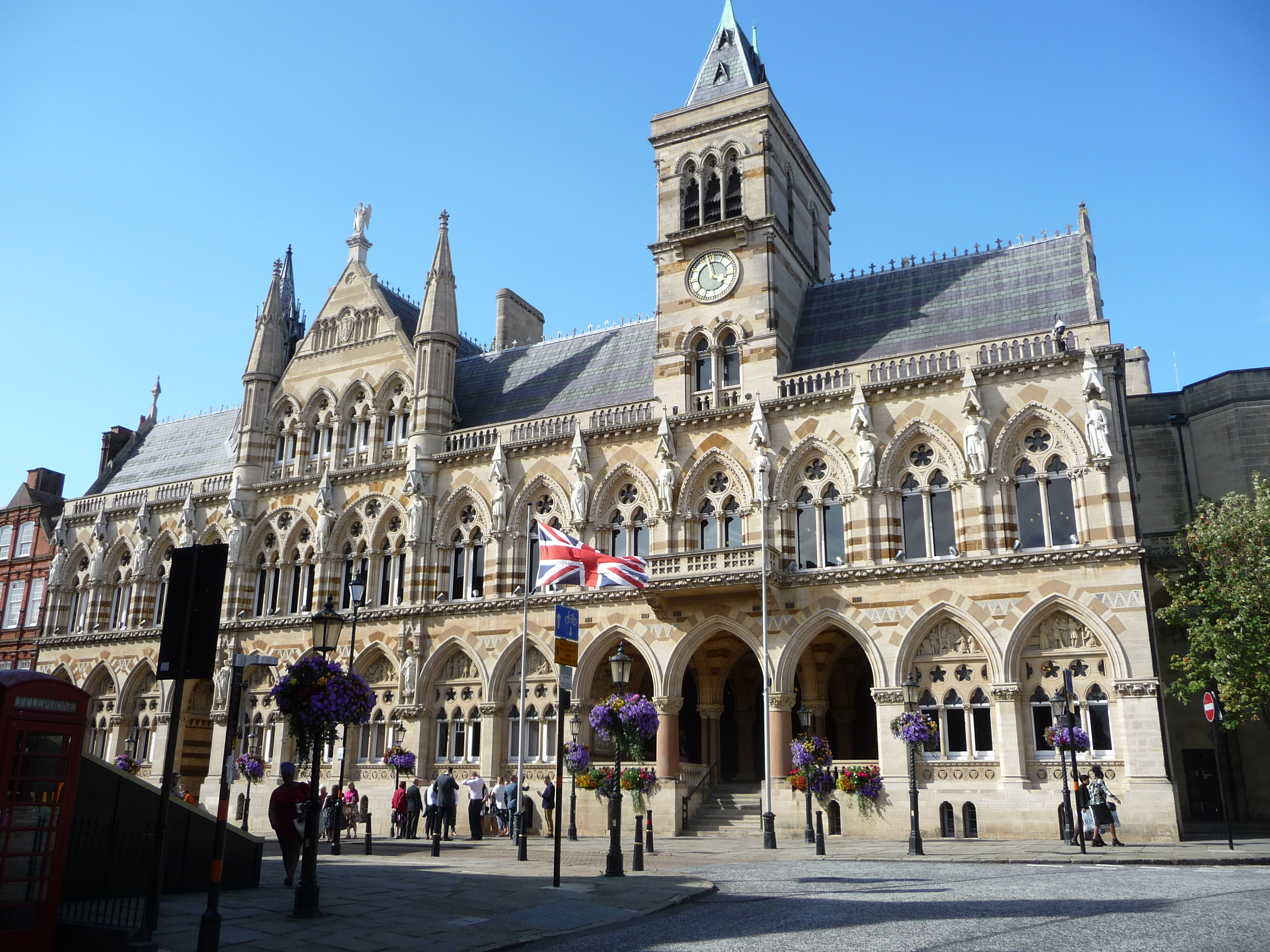
Northampton

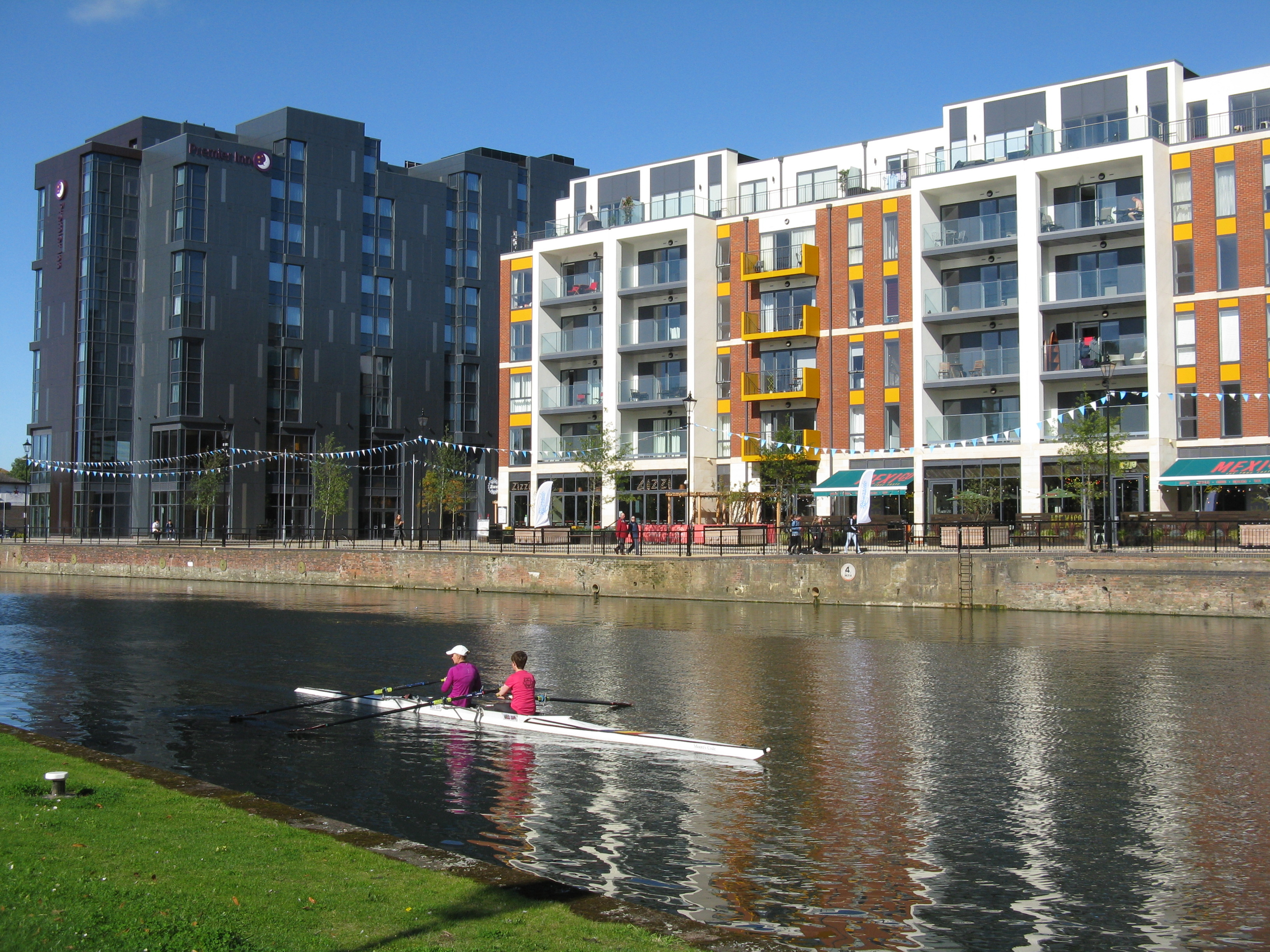
Bedford

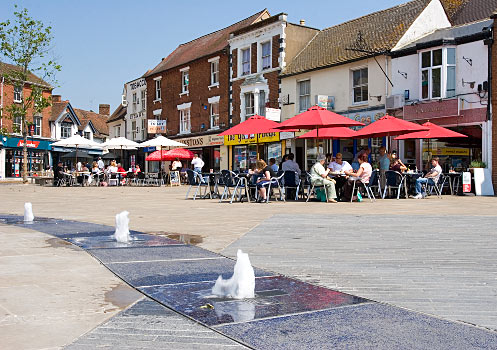
Aylesbury

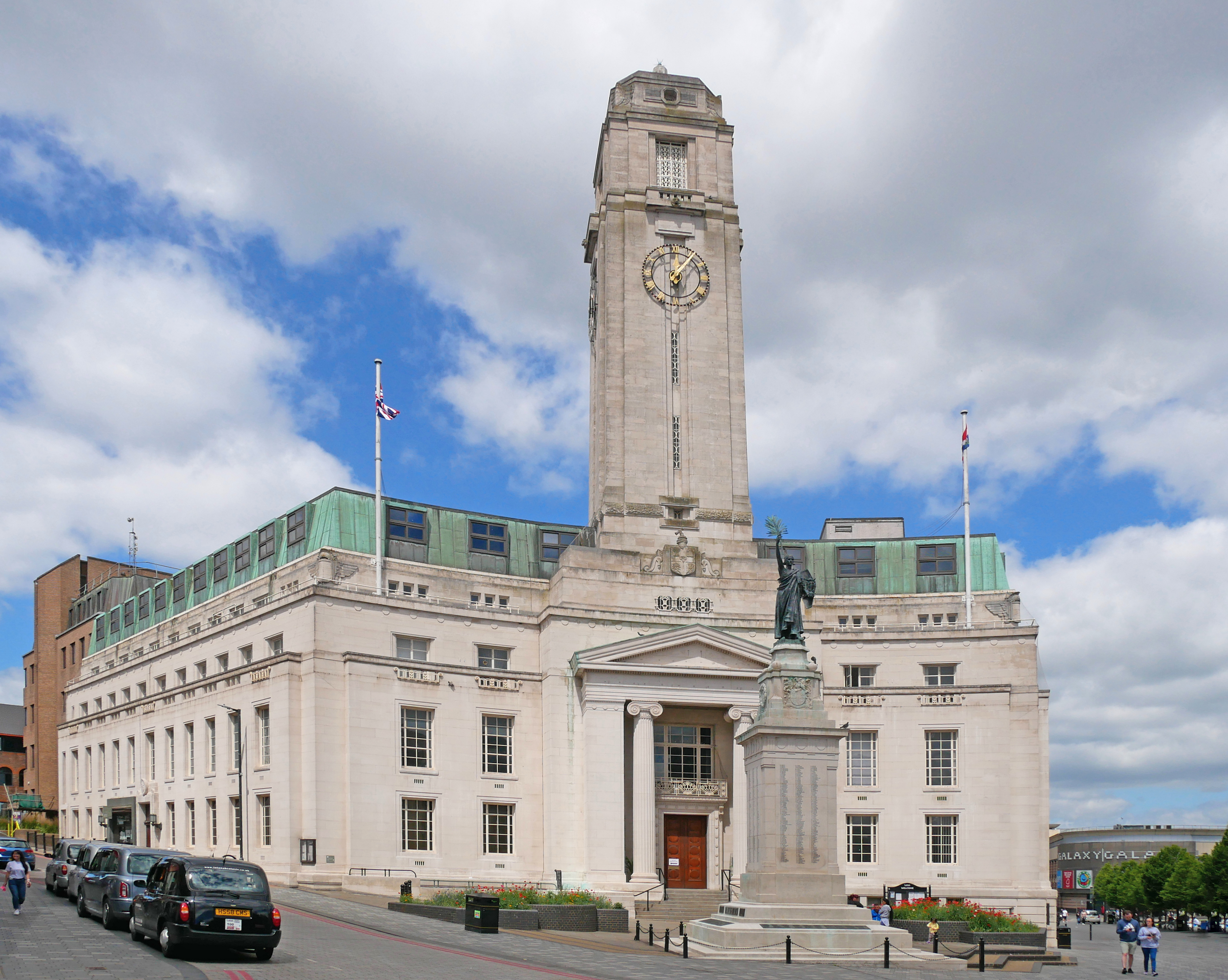
Luton

== See also ==
- Historical and alternative regions of England
- Middle Anglia
- Five Boroughs of the Danelaw § The Danish burhs to the south
- Cambridge - Milton Keynes - Oxford corridor
- North Midlands
- East Midlands
- West Midlands
