= Thorn, Bedfordshire =

Hamlet in Bedfordshire, England

Coordinates: 51.9142°N 0.53318°W

Thorn
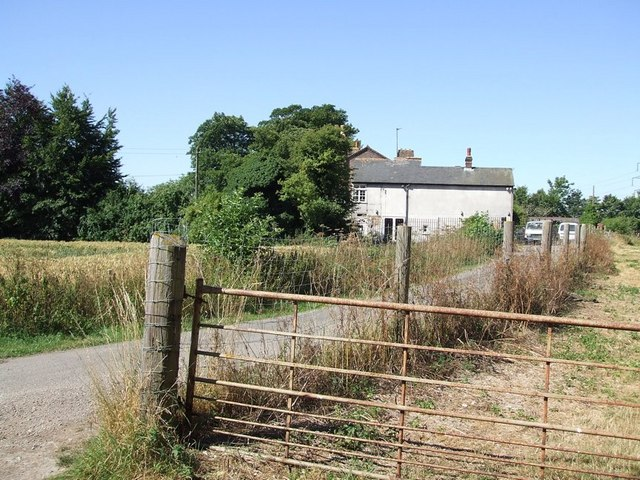

- Location within Bedfordshire
- OS grid reference: TL009249
- Civil parish: Houghton Regis
- Unitary authority: Central Bedfordshire
- Ceremonial county: Bedfordshire
- Region: East
- Country: England
- Sovereign state: United Kingdom
- Post town: DUNSTABLE
- Postcode district: LU5
- Dialling code: 01582
- Police: Bedfordshire
- Fire: Bedfordshire
- Ambulance: East of England
- UK Parliament: South West Bedfordshire

Thorn is a hamlet located in the Central Bedfordshire district of Bedfordshire, England.

The settlement is located to the north of Bidwell and Houghton Regis, and to the south of Wingfield and Chalgrave.
