= The Passage (2007 film) =

- DVD cover
- Directed by: Mark Heller
- Written by: Neil Jackson
- Produced by: Lynette Howell Taylor Jeremy Kipp Walker; Stephen Dorff; Mark Heller
- Starring: Neil Jackson; Stephen Dorff; Sarai Givaty; Abdel Ghani Benizza; Khalid Benchagra; Joaquín Cosío; Neil Fluellen
- Cinematography: Jim Denault
- Edited by: Jonathan Del Gatto
- Music by: Timothy Williams
- Production company: Silverwood Films
- Distributed by: Think film
- Release date: March 18, 2007
- Running time: 109 minutes
- Countries: United States, Israel
- Languages: English and Riffian

The Passage is a 2007 thriller-horror film directed by Mark Heller and starring a large ensemble cast that includes Stephen Dorff, Neil Jackson, Abdel Ghani Benizza, Khalid Benchagra, Sarai Givaty and Neil Fluellen. The film revolves around an American man falling for a Moroccan woman. They find out that their romance can put them in danger and they seek out the help of people they know. Filming started in Morocco on October 1, 2006. It was released in the United States on March 18, 2007 and was released on DVD on September 5, 2007.

== Plot ==
Two friends, Luke (Stephen Dorff) and Adam (Neil Jackson) travel to Morocco to relax and have a party. Adam thinks it's the best way for Luke to get over the death of Luke's girlfriend. While Adam prefers night life and parties, Luke writes a diary and takes numerous photographs of the Morocco and Moroccan way of life. During one of the walks across the city, Luke meets a Moroccan girl Zahra (Sarai Givaty) who offers him the help as a tourist guide. They are immediately attracted to each other although they need to be careful not to violate local customs which forbid local women to have any close contacts with the foreigners.

Zahra recognizes Luke's interest in exploring Morocco and invites him and Adam to a two-day trip to a remote village in the Atlas Mountains to show Luke some sights which are unseen by most tourists; Adam decides to join them the next day. When Luke and Zahra arrive to the village (previously a skiing center), they go to the only hotel left but are turned away by the angry receptionist who does not allow unmarried couples to stay overnight. They are forced to find another location to spend the night and they find a local man who invites them to spend the night in one of his cabins. They gladly accept his offer and he takes them to the cabin.

During the night Luke discovers a hidden tunnel which spreads into a labyrinth; he finds out that the tunnels connect all cabins in the village. Later Zahra awakes and follows Luke and they explore more of the tunnel network. They follow a strange noise and discover a room with an operating table and a chest freezer full of stainless steel boxes. Luke opens one of the boxes and becomes frightened (although the content of the box is not revealed). He and Zahra try to reach their cabin but find out that somebody has picked up all candles Luke used to illuminate the tunnels. Finally they enter another cabin whose door is locked. While Luke tries to open the door, somebody grabs Zahra and drags her to the tunnels. Trying to find her, Luke is ambushed by a man who knocks him down unconscious.

The next morning Adam takes a bus trip to the village to join Luke and Zahra but fails to find them. He is approached by a man who offered the cabin to Luke and Zahra. Adam recognizes him as Hossef, an acquaintance of Adam who invited him to the village before, although Adam refused to go that time. He takes Adam to the cabin where Luke and Zahra spent the night. Adam finds Zahra who is frightened but Luke has disappeared. Suddenly Hossef grabs a lever and tries to hit Adam but Adam manages to avoid the strike and subdues him. Together with Zahra they enter the tunnels to find Luke. They again enter the room that Luke and Zahra found before and a terrified Adam sees Luke's corpse lying on the operating table. It is revealed that the room is used for the illegal human organ harvesting and Zahra's role is to lure naive men into the village where they can be kidnapped and their organs taken. Adam is knocked down and regains consciousness tied up to the operating table with the team of surgeons (including Zahra) preparing the surgical tools. Adam asks why he and Luke were kidnapped and a flashback reveals the events which were staged to lure them into a trap - including a young girl who cuts Luke and a woman who scratches Adam during sex to get blood samples.

The film ends with Zahra approaching an English tourist, Chris, whom she offers help. One of the stainless steel boxes with human organs is packed into the car and sent to the private hospital somewhere in the west.

== Critical reception ==
The Passage received negative reviews.
