= Neil Jackson =

English actor, singer, musician and writer

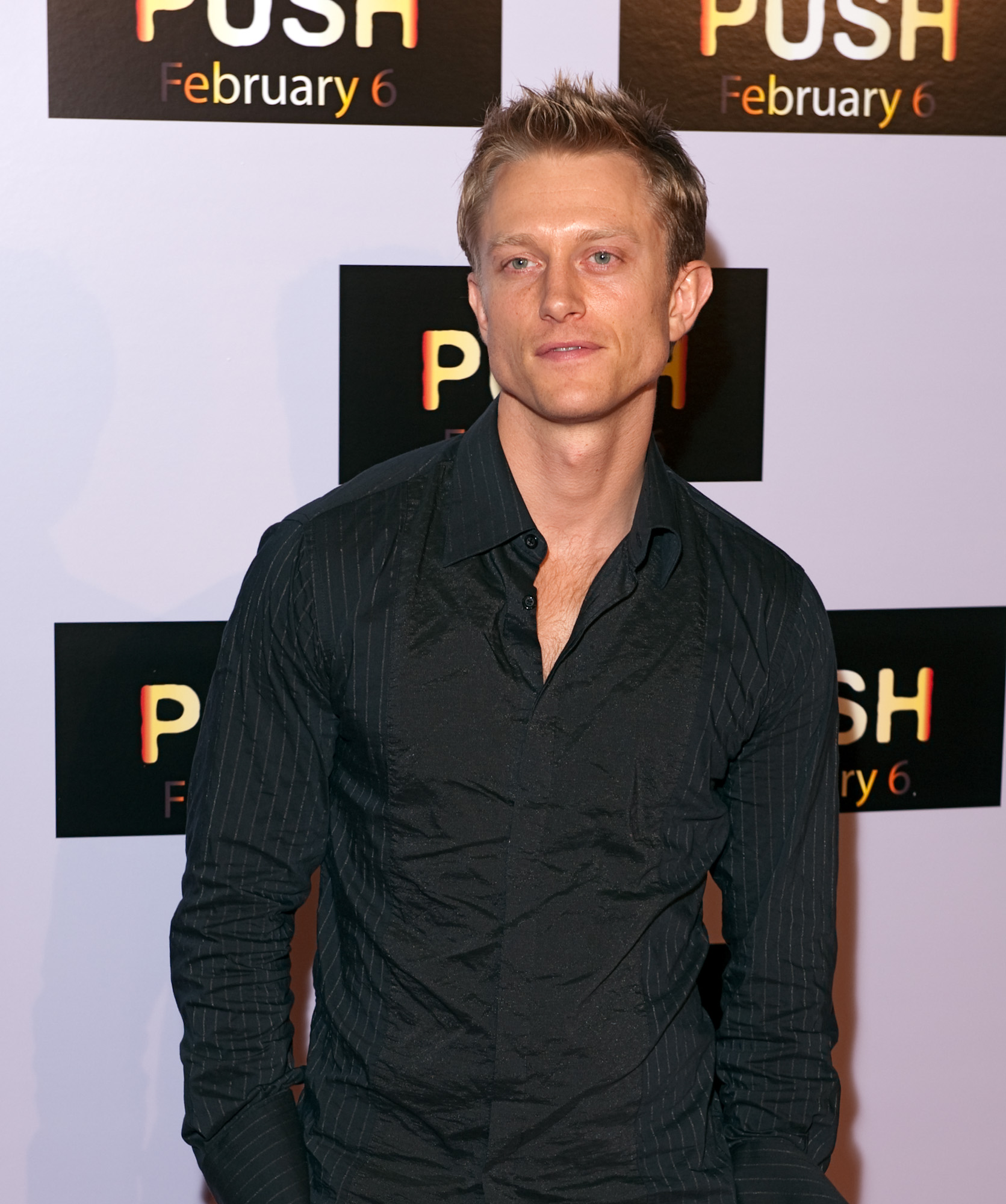
- Jackson in 2009
- Born: 5 March 1976 (age 50); Luton, Bedfordshire, England
- Education: Harlington Upper School
- Alma mater: University of Wales Institute Cardiff
- Occupations: Actor, singer, musician writer
- Years active: 2001–present

Neil Jackson (born 5 March 1976) is an English actor, singer, musician and writer who has appeared in several television series and films, but is probably best known for his role as Marcus van Sciver on Blade: The Series, as Sasha on Make It or Break It and as Jordan Mahkent/Icicle on Stargirl (2020–2022).

His screenwriting credits include the film The Passage directed by Mark Heller and released in 2007. He has starred in several other films including Quantum of Solace and Push.

== Early life ==
Jackson was born in Luton, Bedfordshire, the second of four sons of Evelyn and Dennis Jackson.

Jackson began acting when studying drama at GCSE level in Harlington Upper School. While there he was in several school plays including Annie, Little Shop of Horrors, Hard Times, and West Side Story. He also acted in National Youth Theatre as a teenager before moving to Cardiff to study sport at the University of Wales Institute Cardiff (UWIC) in Wales.

In Wales, Jackson started competitive boxing, entering in the British Universities Boxing Championships, an inter-university competition held throughout the whole of Britain, and won the gold at light middleweight. He went on to successfully defend his title two years later at middleweight. His boxing earned him a scholarship to stay on at UWIC, where he earned his master's degree and graduated in 1998.

== Career ==
Not knowing how to get into acting, Jackson wrote a musical and entered it into a national competition for new writers. It came in third and gained attention from producers in London including Michael Armstrong. He later enrolled in Michael Armstrong's Acting Academy, graduating in 2002.

Jackson's first professional acting job was in the UK national touring production of Strindberg's classic Miss Julie. He understudied the lead character, Jean, a role he took over in the West End production later that year. His breakthrough came in 2004 when Oliver Stone cast him as Perdiccas in the Hollywood blockbuster film, Alexander, alongside Colin Farrell and Angelina Jolie. When he met the director, he had a black eye and three stitches in his eyebrow, a fact he jokes must have assisted him as Stone cast him for the role on the spot. He was also in the British football drama Dream Team for a season as lottery winning chairman Phil Wallis.

In 2006, he made a guest appearance on American TV's Cold Case in the season 4 episode "Sandhogs", as "Donny", the victim killed during a cave-in by his brother-in-law. Then The Passage was released in 2007, a film written by Jackson and shot in Morocco, in which he played a lead character alongside Stephen Dorff. It won the 2008 Jury Award at the Durango Film Festival. He made further TV guest appearances: on CSI: Crime Scene Investigation in the season 8 episode "A La cart"; as "Ian" on How I Met Your Mother; in 2008 on CSI: Miami; and in 2009 as a wraith on Stargate: Atlantis.

In 2008, Jackson filmed scenes on location in Panama for the Bond film Quantum of Solace, where he played the character of Mr. Slate. He previously starred in the ABC Family original series, Make It or Break It as Sasha Belov. Additionally, Jackson has appeared as Lucas Hellinger, a Blackout conspirator, on the ABC show FlashForward. In 2010, he starred as the chauffeur, Harry Spargo, in the BBC revival of Upstairs, Downstairs. Jackson was cast in the lead role of Sir Percy Blakeney/The Scarlet Pimpernel in Fairbanks Productions' adaptation of the classic tale in 2012.

== Other interests ==
Jackson is patron of UK spinal injuries charity Trust PA, in memory of a friend.

== Filmography ==
=== Film ===
Year	Title	Role	Notes
2004	Alexander	Perdiccas	
2005	Breakfast on Pluto	Man at Disco	
2006	The Last Drop	Flight Sergeant Simkins	
2006	The Thirst	Duke of Earl	
2007	Passage	Adam	
2008	15-40	Kai Hansen	Short film
2008	Quantum of Solace	Mr. Slate	
2009	Push	Victor Budarin	
2009	Table for Three	Tre	
2010	You Will Meet a Tall Dark Stranger	Alan	
2012	True Bloodthirst	Derricks	
2016	Nocturnal Animals	Christopher	
2018	Welcome to Marwen	Kurt	
2021	The King's Man	Captain Forrest	
incomplete	~~Shiver~~	Lewis Brisbane	Filming halted December 2024, as studio failed to continue its funding

=== Television ===
Year	Title	Role	Notes
2002–2003	Dream Team	Phil Wallis	32 episodes
2002	Heartbeat	Jeremy Purves	Episode: "The Leopard's Spots"
2002	The House That Jack Built	Charlie	Episode: "Dynasty"
2002	Is Harry on the Boat?	Matthew	Episode: "#1.10"
2002	Ultimate Force	Luke	Episode: "Natural Selection"
2002	Silent Witness	Marcus Saul	2 episodes
2003	The Last Detective	Stuart Gilley	Episode: "Lofty"
2004	Red Cap	Private Robbie McCoy	Episode: "Fighting Fit"
2005	Sugar Rush	Dale	Recurring role
2005	Stargate SG-1	Khalek	Episode: "Prototype"
2006	Blade: The Series	Marcus Van Sciver	Main role
2006	Cold Case	John Donovan	Episode: "Sandhogs"
2007	CSI: Crime Scene Investigation	Michael, The Waiter	Episode: "A La Cart"
2007	How I Met Your Mother	Ian	Episode: "Third Wheel"
2008	CSI: Miami	Paul Sanders	Episode: "Won't Get Fueled Again"
2008	The Cleaner	Duncan Collins	2 episodes
2008	Stargate Atlantis	Wraith	Episode: "Vegas"
2009–2012	Make It or Break It	Sasha Belov	Main role (Seasons 1-2); Recurring role (Season 3)
2010–2012	Upstairs, Downstairs	Harry Spargo	Main role
2010	FlashForward	Lucas Hallinger	Recurring role
2011	White Collar	David Lawrence	Episode: "On Guard"
2013–2015	Sleepy Hollow	Abraham Van Brunt	Recurring role
2013	Jo	Baron	Episode: "Invalides"
2013	Lightfields	Dwight Lawson	Recurring role
2014	House of Secrets	Sam	Television movie
2014	Person of Interest	Rick Dillinger	Episode: "RAM"
2016	Hell's Kitchen	Himself	Episode: "5 Chefs Compete"
2017	The Originals	Alistair Duquesne	Episode: "Gather Up the Killers"
2017–2020	Absentia	Jack Byrne	Main role
2018	Westworld	Nicholas	Episode: "Virtù e Fortuna"
2020–2022	Stargirl	Jordan Mahkent / Icicle	Main role (Season 1); Guest (Season 2); Recurring role (Season 3)
2024	Tracker	William Locke	Episode: "Noble Rot"
