= Grant Palmer (bus operator) =

English bus operator

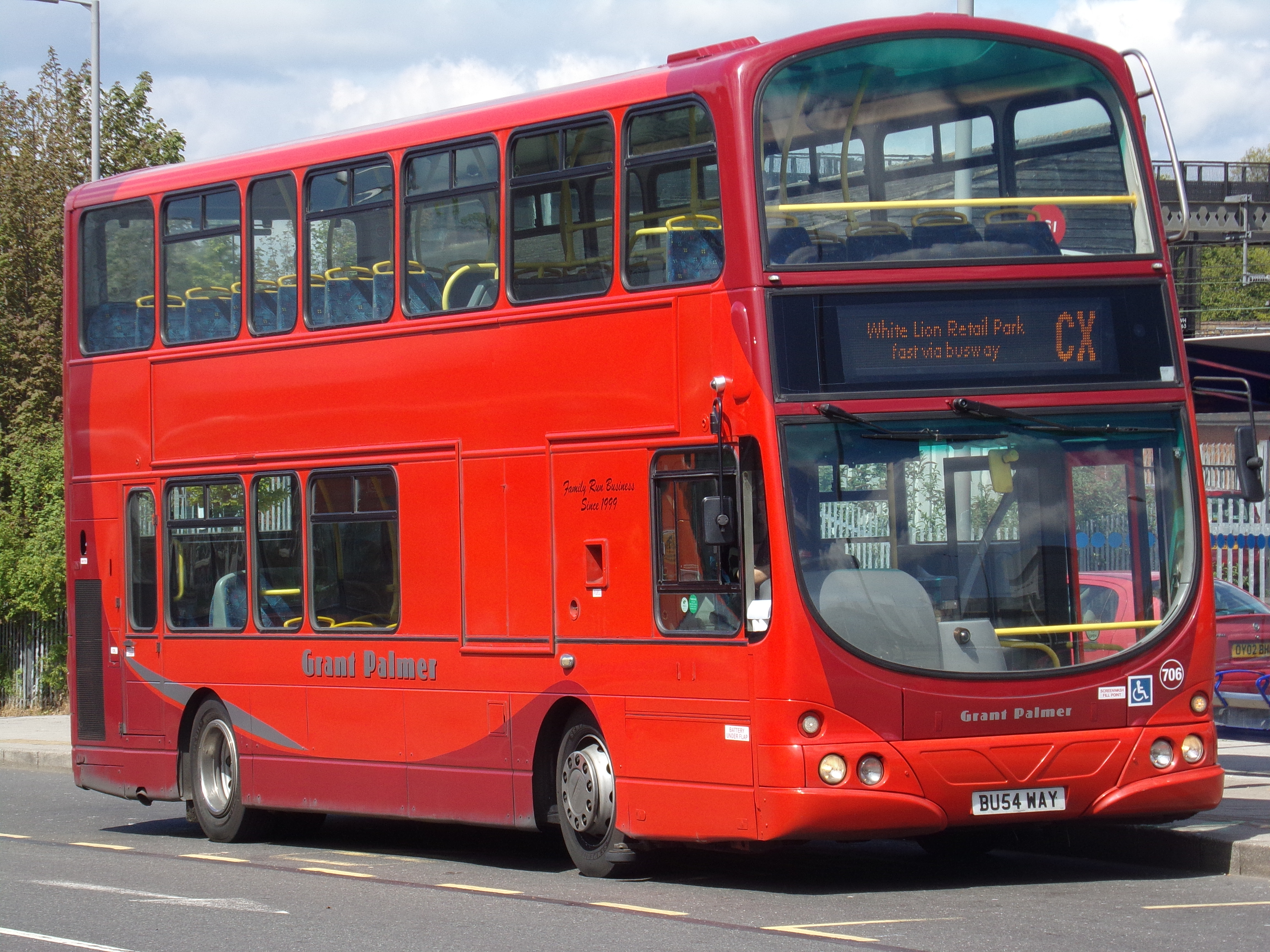
A bus operated by Grant Palmer

Grant Palmer is an English bus operator that was established in 1999.

== History ==
The business was started in October 1999 by Grant Palmer with two double-decker buses and two school contracts. In 2011, the company moved to its current base in Flitwick.

== Ticketing ==
In October 2021, the firm launched the "Cygnet" ticket in Bedford along with competitors Stagecoach East and Uno. The tickets are valid on all three companies' services.

The company utilises the Ticketer system, complete with an additional tap-on, tap-off feature, launched in April 2022. Customers tap on via existing Ticketer machines when boarding and use new tap off readers when alighting.

== Fleet ==
In 2019, it had a fleet of 35 buses. Most of its fleet consists of buses manufactured by Alexander Dennis. By 2022, the fleet had grown to 40 buses.

December 2022 saw the company invest in two 10.8m Alexander Dennis Enviro 200MMCs, in order to add "much-needed capacity" on routes 72 and 73, with the buses being able to carry 25% more passengers than previously ordered vehicles.

In October 2024, Grant Palmer took delivery of a guidewheel-equipped Volvo B8RLE/ MCV Evora, supplied by Volvo Bus UK and Ireland. It runs the Hi route between Luton and Houghton Regis via the Busway, and is the 17th new vehicle that the company has purchased since 2015.

April 2025 saw the debut of a brand-new revised livery on a pair of Alexander Dennis Enviro200 small buses (8.9m examples), for what the operator says is a modern and dynamic look, while maintaining a strong brand identity. Representing a spend of over £450,000 by the company, high-backed seats with belts are fitted, along with USB charging points. Arrival of the buses takes to 19 the number of new vehicle additions purchased in the past 10 years, with half of the Grant Palmer fleet having been replaced in that time. That gives the business a lower average fleet age than any other bus operator in Bedfordshire.
