= Sarai Givaty =

Israeli actress, musician and model

- שרי גבעתי
- Born: Sarai Givaty; June 24, 1982 (age 44); Tiberias, Israel
- Other name: ESH
- Occupations: Actress; television host; singer-songwriter; model
- Years active: 2004–present
- Spouse: Or Luboschits (m. 2014)
- Children: 2

Sarai Givaty-Luboschits (Hebrew: שרי גבעתי; June 24, 1982) is an Israeli actress, singer-songwriter, and model. As a musician, she is also known by her stage name ESH.

== Early life ==
Born Sarai Givaty (or Givati) in Tiberias, Israel, and raised to an Israeli family of both Sephardi Jewish and Mizrahi Jewish (Iraqi-Jewish and Moroccan-Jewish) descent. Her parents are Edna (née Elkayam) and Eliyahu Givaty. She has two sisters, one of whom is married to Israeli actor Guy Arieli. Givaty moved to the U.S. after her high school graduation.

She claims that she was discharged from the Israel Defense Forces after several days of military service, because of severe allergies to dust.

== Career ==
Givaty's first role was in a live sketch on the Israeli tonight show (Kol Layla) where she played an American reporter. The segment was very successful. On the final show, Israeli hush critic Raana Shacked called it "the pick of the show". Givaty continued shooting the segment even after she moved to New York City where she attended acting school at the HB Studios.

In 2005, Givaty was a part of a small group of well-known young adult television hosts who received the "Best Teen Show of The Year" from the Israel Golden Screen Award (Masah Hazahav) for hosting the show Exit on Arutz 10. Shortly thereafter, Givaty became a big name in the Israeli entertainment industry and received many large company endorsements.

A year later Givaty decided to explore her work options in Los Angeles. Upon her arrival, she quickly landed the lead role in a film called The Passage starring opposite Stephen Dorff. In 2007, the movie premiered at the Toronto International Film Festival where critics called Givaty's performance "star making".

Another notable project she has worked on was the lead in the Enrique Iglesias video "Somebody's Me".

In 2008, she played a Russian spy in the pilot episode of My Own Worst Enemy next to Christian Slater. In 2009, she was back in Israel to shoot yet another comedic role in TV series called The Pilot Wives.

In 2010, it was announced that Givaty would portray Mossad Officer Liat Tuvia for two episodes in the eighth season of NCIS. Then-executive producer Shane Brennan elaborated on the character's role in the story arc, saying that Liat's presence would leave series regular Ziva (Cote de Pablo), a former Mossad agent, feeling replaced "personally and professionally". In an interview after the first episode aired, Givaty commented, "Let's just say, Liat is a good guy at the end of the day. It's just that her ways are different. Like, she doesn't say 'Drop your weapon' before she shoots a terrorist. She just shoots him and says 'Drop your weapon'...So, yeah, she has her way, but at the end of the day, she's a good guy."

Givaty also plays piano and guitar in a band and has been playing concerts in both Israel and Los Angeles.

In 2014, she appeared in The Expendables 3 alongside Mel Gibson and Robert Davi.

In 2017, she co-starred in the romantic thriller film Body of Deceit, alongside Kristanna Loken.

== Personal life ==
Givaty married Israeli businessman Or Luboschits on September 5, 2014. In 2015, they had a baby son, Riff. In March 2018, she had her daughter, Kai. The four reside in Tel Aviv, Israel.

== Remarks on the Israeli–Palestinian conflict ==
In a September 2025 interview on Israeli channel i24NEWS, she was asked: "Is it possible not to feel upset about any child in the world who is crying?". In response, Givati said "I am upset. But at the same time, I understand that if we don't take action, this child will grow up and become a 'terrorist'." Francesca Albanese, UN Special Rapporteur on the situation of human rights in the Palestinian territories occupied since 1967, accused Givaty of advocating for the killing of Palestinian children, saying, "[t]his was also the argument presented by Nazi officials during the Nuremberg trials to justify their killing of children during the Holocaust." Givaty denied advocating for violence, saying that she was referring to the indoctrination of children by both Islamism and the Israeli far-right. She also criticized far-right ministers Itamar Ben-Gvir and Bezalel Smotrich in the same interview. In October 2026, Givaty announced that she would sue Albanese for NIS 500,000 for defamation.

== Filmography ==
List of acting performances in film and television
Title	Year	Role	Notes and awards
Exit	2003	Herself Host	
Kol Layla	2004	Stefanie/Hollywood Reporter	TV series
CSI: Crime Scene Investigation	2006	Natal Peled	TV series, episode "Happenstance"
The Passage	2007	Zahara	
My Own Worst Enemy	2008	Female Russian Agent	TV series, episode "Breakdown"
The Pilot Wives	2009–2010	Daniela	TV series, 125 episodes
NCIS	2010	Mossad Officer Liat Tuvia	TV series, 2 episodes
Am Sgula	2011	Various	TV series, 2 episodes
The Legend of Hercules	2014	Saphirra	Film
The Expendables 3	2014	Camilla	Film
Words with Gods	2014		
The Jews are Coming	2014	Stav Burstein	TV show
Irreversible	2016	Hila	TV series, 1 episode
Body of Deceit	2017	Sara	Film
State Rules	2018	Noga Gilboa	TV series
