= Oak Bank School =

Location
- Sandy Lane; Leighton Buzzard, Bedfordshire, LU7 3BE; England; 52.937°N 0.660°W

Information
- Type: Special school; Academy
- Established: 1976
- Department for Education URN: 140286 Tables
- Ofsted: Reports
- Headteacher: Philip Collier
- Gender: Coeducational
- Age: 9 to 16
- Enrolment: 127
- Website: https://www.oakbank.beds.sch.uk/

Oak Bank School is a co-educational special school with academy status located in Leighton Buzzard, Bedfordshire, England. The school accepts pupils with educational, health care plans identifying Social, Emotional & Mental Health (SEMH) as the Primary Educational need. Pupils attend from Central Bedfordshire and its bordering authorities.

Oak Bank was established in 1976 as school for 'mal-adjusted children', and originally had capacity for 40 boarding pupils and 20 day pupils. The school had been commissioned by Luton County Borough, specifically for children from Luton, however Bedfordshire County Council took over responsibility for completing the school after the Local Government Act 1972, and the school accepted children from all over the county of Bedfordshire from its opening. Central Bedfordshire Council took over responsibility for the school after the 2009 structural changes to local government in England. In November 2013 the school converted to academy status establishing itself as a Single Academy Trust (SAT).

Oak Bank School has been judged by Ofsted as three times (2015, 2019, 2024) 'Outstanding'. Establishing the Single Academy Trust as a Centre of Excellence within their specialist area of education. Since 2019 the School has been a lead Behaviour Hub school for the DfE and has provided specialist support to school leadership teams up and down the country.
