= Luton/Dunstable urban area =

Conurbation in Bedfordshire, England

Coordinates: 51.899°N 0.479°W

Luton/Dunstable urban area

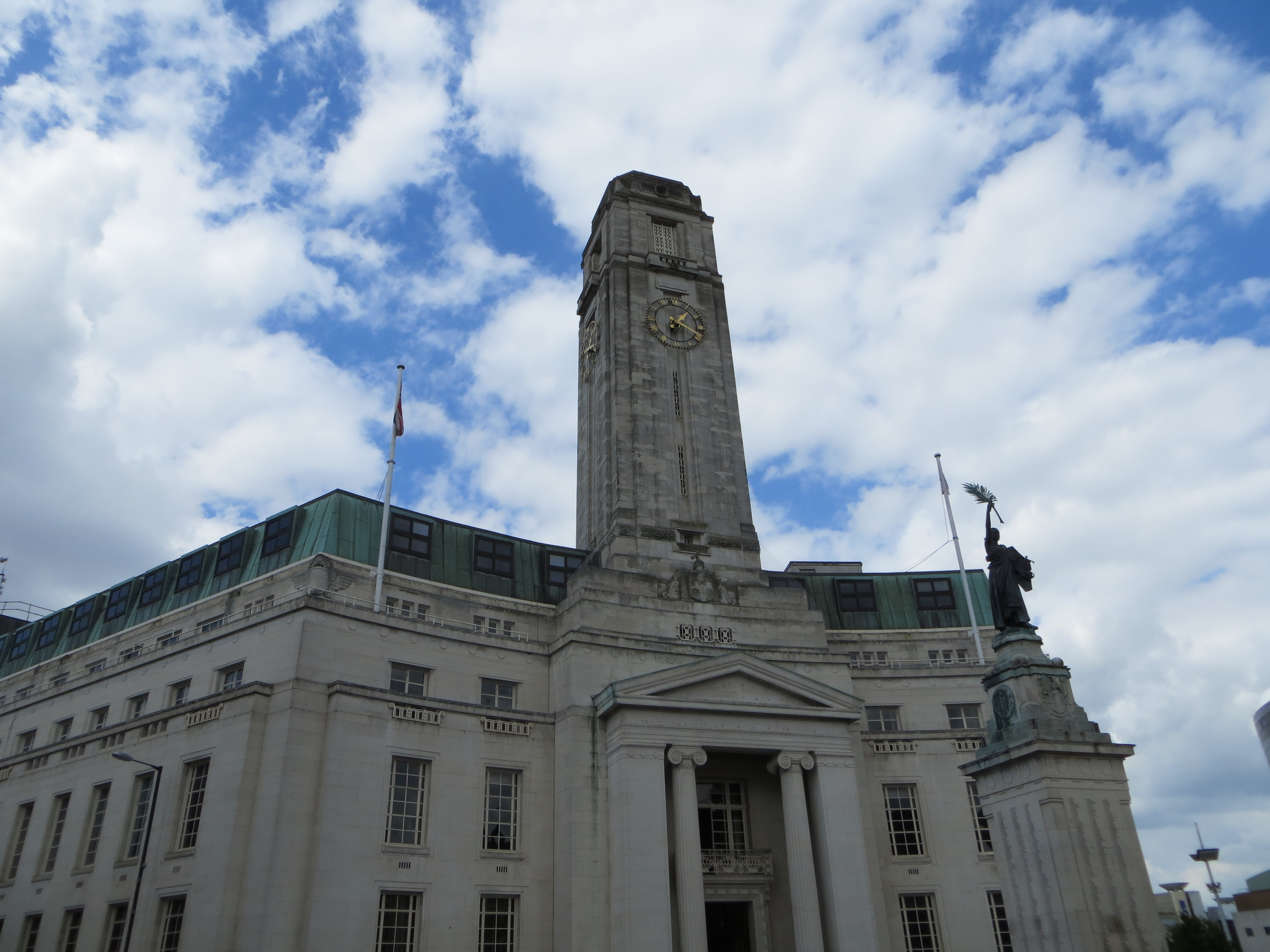
Luton Town Hall in George Street, Luton

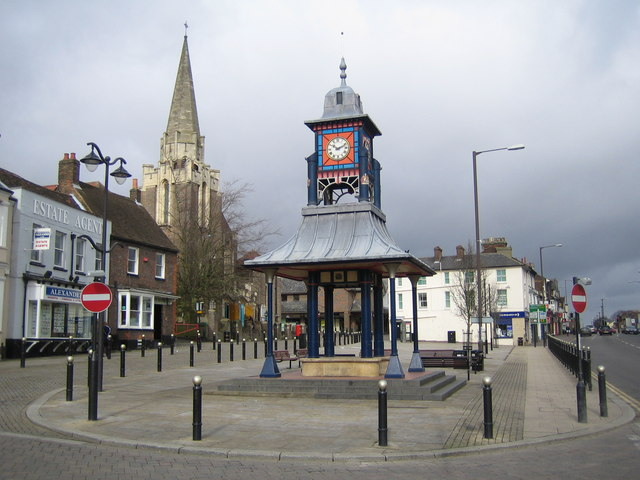
Dunstable clock tower, High Street South, built in 1999

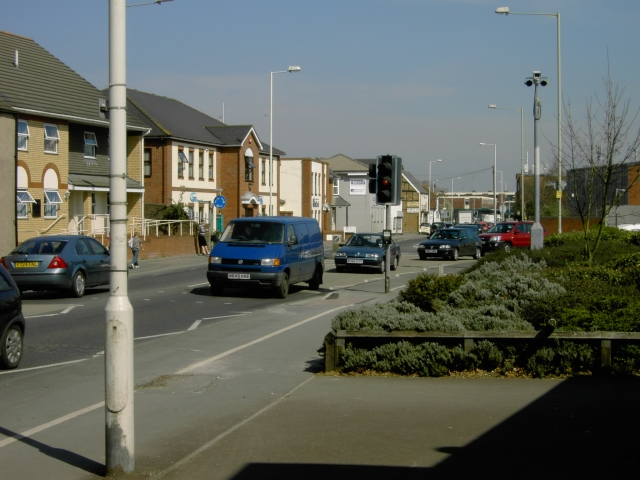
Houghton Regis High Street

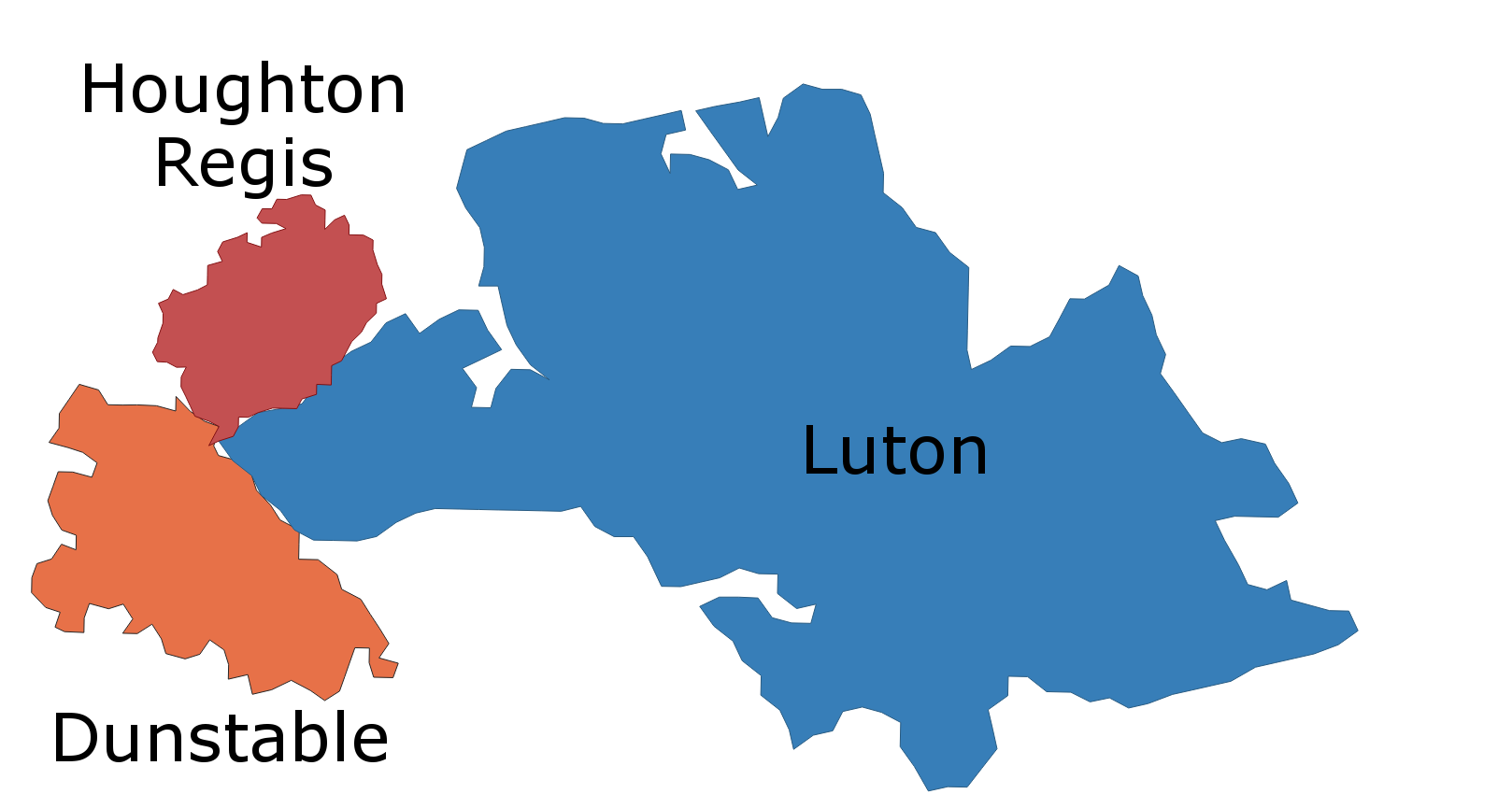
Map of the Luton/Dunstable urban area with subdivisions

The Luton/Dunstable urban area, according to the Office for National Statistics, is the conurbation (continuous built up area) including the settlements of Luton, Dunstable and Houghton Regis, in Bedfordshire, East of England.

Despite straddling district boundaries the conurbation shares many facilities including an integrated bus service and the large Luton and Dunstable University Hospital. The conurbation is located in the southern part of the ceremonial county of Bedfordshire, England, and includes the unitary authority of Luton, and part of Central Bedfordshire. The current population (2021 census) is 286,803. This is an increase of 9% from the 2011 population of 258,018.

== Future growth ==
The area is expected to grow due to development within and physical expansion of the three towns and large re-development of Luton, including redevelopment of the former Vauxhall Motors factory complex.

The Luton & Dunstable urban area is considered part of the Milton Keynes and South Midlands Sub Region, part of the East of England. the East of England Regional Spatial Strategy has outlined the identified the urban area for growth, as part of the Sustainable Communities Plan. It is also considered part of the London Commuter Belt.
