= Etonbury Academy =

Coordinates: 52.0197°N 0.2466°W

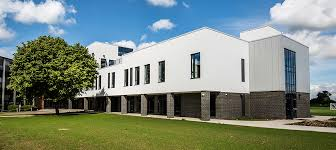
- Arlesey, Bedfordshire; England

Information
- Type: Extended Secondary School; Academy
- Motto: 'The ETA Way'
- Established: 1955
- Department for Education URN: 137632 Tables
- Ofsted: Reports
- Head teacher: Joanne Young
- Gender: Mixed
- Age: 9 to 19
- Enrolment: 1109
- Houses: Thatchers, Foresters, Carters & Saddlers
- Colours: Navy and Light Blue
- Website: www.etonbury.org.uk

Etonbury Academy (formerly Etonbury Middle School) is an extended secondary school with Academy Status that is located in Central Bedfordshire, catering for the 9 – 19 age range; each split across Year 5, 6, 7, 8, 9, 10, 11, 12, 13.

The number of students on roll as of the most recent publication is 1069.

== History ==
The school underwent investment, development and expansion and became a full extended secondary school covering the age range 9–16 years on the 1st of September 2016. Major new building included classroom blocks, a new study centre, multimedia and drama studio, rooftop art rooms and art terraces, Design Technology workshops, Science Labs, new management offices and the Pendleton Sports Centre (named for Victoria Pendleton CBE who was a student at the school) - a community sports and fitness centre, along with a 3G AstroTurf pitch. The Phase 2 Expansion Build was completed and opened in September 2018. It included additional science labs, food technology rooms, classrooms and the Etonbury Juniors block for Year 5 and 6 students.

In 2018 a pupil had their drink spiked with Viagra by another pupil whilst on a school trip to Berlin. The school was criticised for the perceived light punishment given to the offending pupil.

The school received an Osted rating of 'Good' in 2012, however after the school expansion it received a rating of 'Requires Improvement' in 2017, despite the school achieving its best SATs results in its history, and receiving an Artsmark Gold award. The school subsequently received an Ofsted rating of "Good" following an inspection in February 2020.

== Notable former pupils ==
- Victoria Pendleton, CBE - British Jockey and Former Track Cyclist.
