= Harlington Upper School =

Location
- Goswell End Road; Harlington, Bedfordshire, LU5 6NX; England
- 51°58′04″N 0°29′15″W

Information
- Type: Academy
- Motto: Creating ambitious, altruistic and accountable leaders
- Established: 1973
- Department for Education URN: 137941 Tables
- Ofsted: Reports
- Headteacher: Helen Harris
- Gender: Coeducational
- Age: 13 to 18
- Enrolment: 1401
- Website: http://www.harlington.org/

Harlington Upper School (HUS) is a rural, coeducational upper school and sixth form with academy status in Harlington, Bedfordshire, England.

== History ==
The school was established in 1974. In 2007 a house-based approach to student support was developed which includes "vertical" tutor groups, meaning that form groups have a mix of ages which encourages students to have stronger relationships with other members of the school, not exclusively their own year.

In 2017, the school removed the vertical tutoring system but decided to keep the current houses. After removing this system, there are only eight schools nationally that still use the vertical tutor system.

== Rating ==
The school was rated 'Good' in its latest Ofsted inspection, with inspectors praising the quality of teaching, strong exam results, and positive student-teacher relationships, particularly in the sixth form. The report also noted significant improvements in student behavior and a school culture focused on high expectations and academic achievement.

== Students ==
The majority of students join Harlington from three Bedfordshire middle schools: Arnold, Parkfields and Robert Bloomfield. The students mainly live in the villages near Harlington including: Harlington, Toddington, Harlington Mill, Sharpenhoe, Barton-le-Clay, Silsoe, Clophill, Westoning, Pulloxhill, Greenfield, Maulden, Ampthill, Flitwick, Luton, Chalton, and Streatley.

Most students join the school in year 9, aged 13. They start their GCSE courses in year 9 and take the GCSE exams in years 10 and 11, aged 15 or 16. Some students choose to continue attending the school following their GCSEs and join a large sixth form of over 420.

== Notable alumni ==
Notable alumni include actor Neil Jackson, actress Emily Atack, and rugby player Josh Bassett.

== Events ==
In 2019, to mark World Mental Health Day, students and staff organized a body-positive fashion show featuring clothing adorned with personal messages about body confidence. Held at the Harpur Centre in Bedford, the event aimed to encourage over 1,000 participants to reflect on self-image, promote self-acceptance, and raise awareness of mental health challenges influenced by societal and media pressures.

== Science College and Academy ==
In September 2006 the school gained specialist Science College status. The school continues to teach the full range of National Curriculum subjects, but uses its strength and expertise in Science and Mathematics to support other schools and the local community. The school has also been selected by the DfES and the Specialist Schools Trust to become a Deep Support Hub for the Eastern Region.

On 1 March 2012, Harlington Upper School officially became an academy.
