= Bidwell, Bedfordshire =

Hamlet in Bedfordshire, England

Coordinates: 51.90658°N 0.52443°W

Bidwell
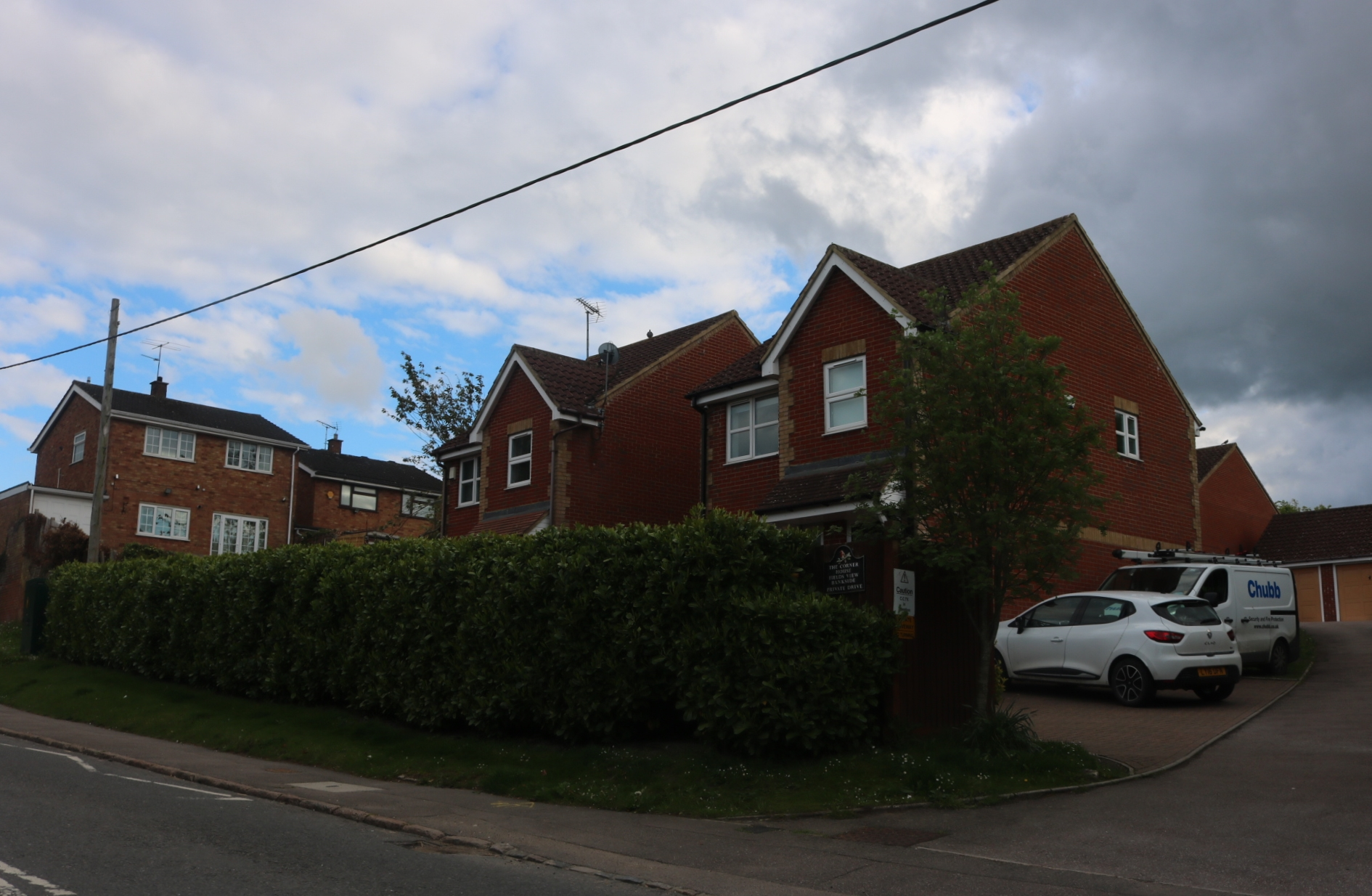
- Bedford Road

- Location within Bedfordshire
- OS grid reference: TL016241
- Civil parish: Houghton Regis
- Unitary authority: Central Bedfordshire
- Ceremonial county: Bedfordshire
- Region: East
- Country: England
- Sovereign state: United Kingdom
- Post town: DUNSTABLE
- Postcode district: LU5
- Dialling code: 01582
- Police: Bedfordshire
- Fire: Bedfordshire
- Ambulance: East of England
- UK Parliament: South West Bedfordshire

Bidwell is a hamlet located within the Parish of Houghton Regis in Central Bedfordshire, England.

Originally a small rural settlement, Bidwell is now a housing development area of the town.
