= Houstone School =

Free school in Houghton Regis, Bedfordshire, England

Location
- Parkside Drive; Houghton Regis, Dunstable, Bedfordshire, LU5 5PX; England; 51°54′50″N 0°30′25″W

Information
- Type: Free School
- Motto: Aspiration • Endeavour • Respect
- Established: 1 September 2022
- Educational authority: Central Bedfordshire Council
- Trust: Advantage Schools
- Department for Education URN: 149107 Tables
- Ofsted: Reports
- Principal: Elizabeth English
- Gender: Coeducational
- Age: 11 to 16
- Colours: Green, Yellow
- Cluster Board: Luton & Central Bedfordshire (Secondary)
- Website: www.houstoneschool.co.uk

Houstone School is a coeducational secondary school located in Houghton Regis in the English county of Bedfordshire.

== History ==
The original school on this site was a community middle school administered by Central Bedfordshire Council, known as Kings Houghton Middle School. It converted to academy status on 1 September 2012 and was renamed Houghton Regis Academy. The school was sponsored by the Greenwood Academies Trust group of Academies.

From September 2013 the school began to change its age range, transitioning to become a secondary school. Houghton Regis Academy closed permanently in August 2022.

The new school building was set to open in 2022, however during construction of the new building Neolithic, Roman and Bronze Age remains were found, delaying completion. The school formally opened in September 2022, with pupils being temporarily located in the buildings of the former UTC Central Bedfordshire. The new school building opened in Autumn 2023.

== The school today ==
Houstone School is a free school sponsored by the Advantage Schools Trust. Features of the school include a longer school day (8.25am to 4pm) and all pupils are taught a musical instrument from Year 7.
