= The Chiltern School =

Coordinates: 51.914°N 0.504°W

- Dunstable & Houghton Regis, Bedfordshire; England

Information
- Type: Community special school
- Motto: Dare To Be Different
- Established: 2012
- Local authority: Central Bedfordshire
- Department for Education URN: 109746 Tables
- Ofsted: Reports
- Headteacher: Lisa Leonard (2017-)
- Gender: Coeducational
- Age: 3 to 19
- Website: https://www.chiltern.beds.sch.uk/

The Chiltern School is a coeducational special school located in Houghton Regis in Bedfordshire, England. The school accepts pupils from all over the Central Bedfordshire area.

== Special education ==
The Chiltern School is for pupils between the ages of 3 and 19 years of age, whose special educational needs fall within the categories of moderate to severe learning difficulties. Some pupils may have additional medical, physical or sensory impairments or emotional and behavioural difficulties.

Facilities for pupils at the Houghton Regis campus of the school include sensory rooms, and a residential bungalow on campus which is used to support the development of pupils' life skills.

== History ==
The school was formed in 2012 from the merger of Glenwood School in Dunstable and Hillcrest School in Houghton Regis. The school continues to operate over both sites with the primary department of the school based in Dunstable and the secondary department based in Houghton Regis. The school celebrated its first anniversary in 2013, with celebrants noting achievements of students and staff.

In 2014, head teacher Shirley-Anne Crosbie was awarded the Order of the British Empire for "For services to Children with Special Needs Education". Since September 2017, Lisa Leonard has served as head teacher.

Since 2022, the school came together in one site in Houghton Regis.

== Inspections and evaluations ==
The UK's Office for Standards in Education (Ofsted) inspected Chiltern School in 2012 and again in 2017, ranking it overall "Good" on both reports.
