= Houghton Regis =

Town and civil parish in Bedfordshire, England

Coordinates: 51.9039°N 0.5247°W

- Town and civil parish
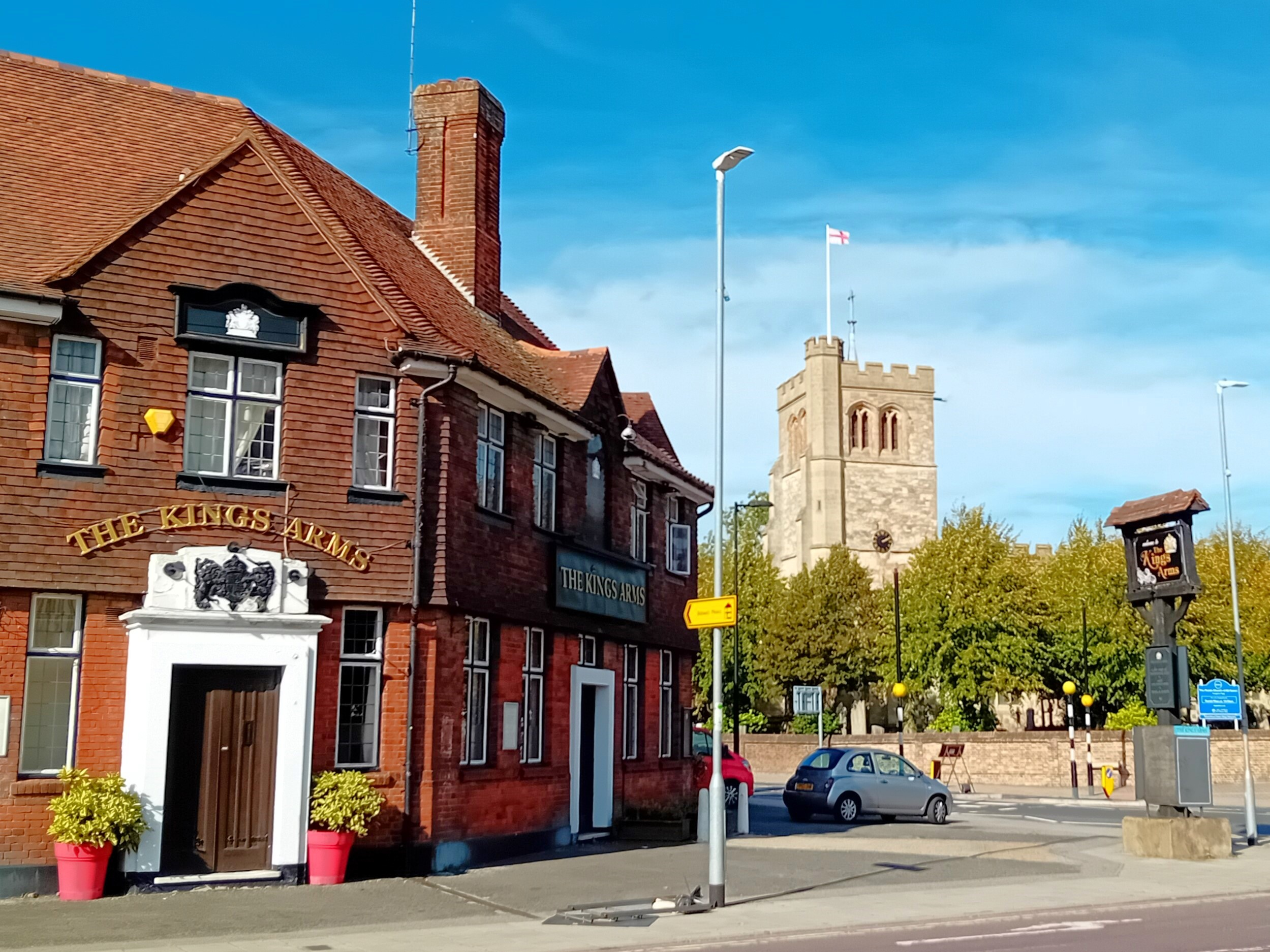
- King's Arms and All Saints' Church

- Location within Bedfordshire
- Population: 19,692 (Parish, 2021); 18,820 (Built up area, 2021)
- Civil parish: Houghton Regis
- Unitary authority: Central Bedfordshire
- Ceremonial county: Bedfordshire
- Region: East
- Country: England
- Sovereign state: United Kingdom
- Post town: DUNSTABLE
- Postcode district: LU5
- Dialling code: 01582
- Police: Bedfordshire
- Fire: Bedfordshire
- Ambulance: East of England
- UK Parliament: Dunstable and Leighton Buzzard

Houghton Regis /ˈhaʊtən ˈriːdʒɪz/ is a town and civil parish in the Central Bedfordshire district of Bedfordshire, England.

The parish includes the hamlets of Bidwell, Thorn and Sewell. Houghton Regis, together with its contiguous neighbours of Dunstable and Luton, form the Luton/Dunstable Urban Area; this is a conurbation with a population over 286,000.

== Name ==
The name Houghton comes from the Saxon word 'hoe' meaning the spur of a hill, and 'tun' meaning a village. By the 11th century, much of South Bedfordshire had become royal land and Houghton became known as Houghton Regis or King's Houghton to distinguish it from the other Houghton in Bedfordshire, which became known as Houghton Conquest.

== History ==
=== Before the town ===
Relics of Paleolithic man, such as flint implements and the bones of contemporary wild animals, suggest prehistoric settlement. At Maiden Bower within Houghton Regis CP, near Sewell, there is an Iron Age hill fort. This is clearly marked on the Ordnance Survey maps.

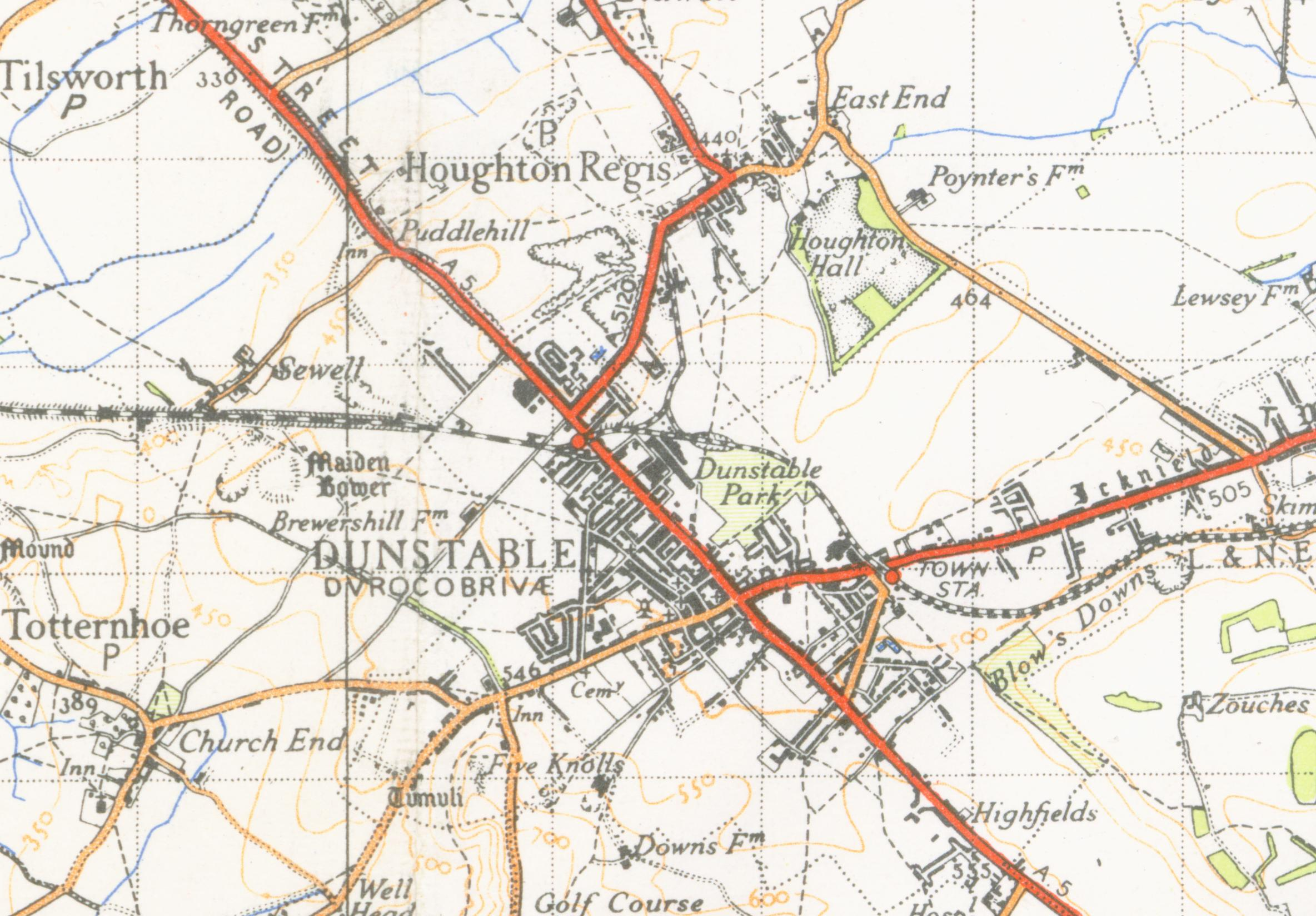
A 1944 OS map of Houghton Regis

Maiden Bower has some of the ramparts showing through the edge of an old chalk quarry where there are Bronze Age remains of an older fort. According to W.H. Matthews (Mazes and Labyrinths, 1922), a turf maze once existed at "Maiden Bower".

The Icknield Way Path passes through the parish on its 110-mile journey from Ivinghoe Beacon in Buckinghamshire to Knettishall Heath in Suffolk. The Icknield Way Trail, a multi-user route for walkers, horse riders and off-road cyclists also passes through the parish.

=== Records of the town ===
Houghton Regis is considerably older than Dunstable, and it is mentioned in the Domesday Book when it was called Houstone. At the time of the Domesday Survey a great part of what is now Dunstable was included in Houghton parish. When Henry I founded Dunstable he gave in compensation to the men of Houghton a wood called Buckwood. At that time it paid in tax the large amount of three pounds by weight and twenty shillings of blanch silver (to the king, William the Conqueror) and one ounce of gold for the Sheriff.

The men of Houghton claimed to be exempt from tolls in Dunstable market. The inhabitants of Houghton Regis were for long employed in straw plaiting. In 1689 they and those of neighbouring villages petitioned against the Bill that made it compulsory to wear woollen hats, pointing out that the straw-plaiters would be ruined and that the farmers also would suffer, as they now obtained good prices for their straw, and English wool not being suitable for hatmaking, they would not be in any way compensated.

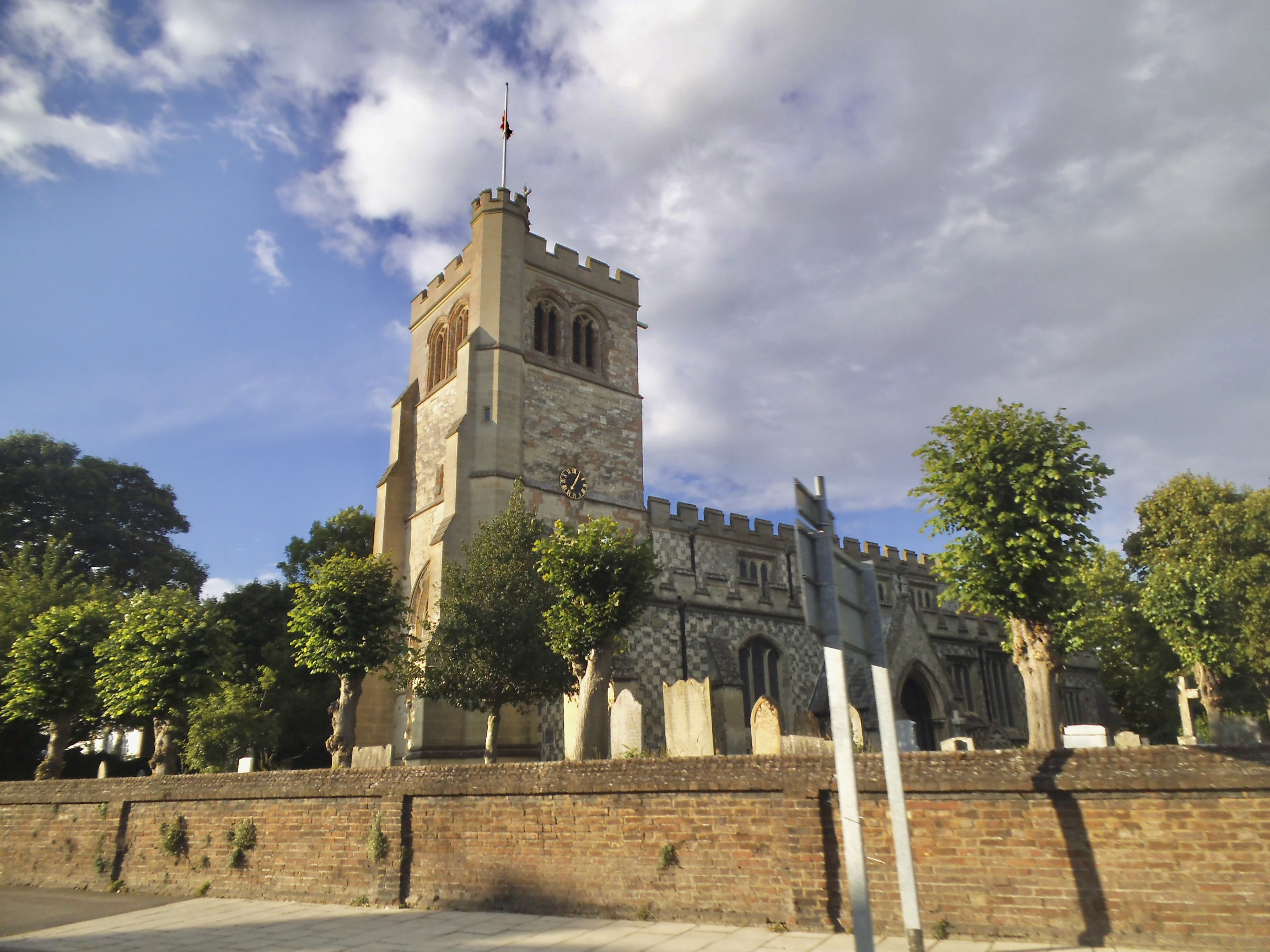
All Saints Church

Bordered by the Chiltern Hills, the town was once a small village that had its character changed when it was earmarked for a massive "London overspill" estate in the 1950s and 60s. The only remains of the manors, rectory land and cottage demesnes around the small village centre are names such as Tithe Farm Road. An indication of the planners' attempts to make the London migrants feel at home is the naming of the local estate roads after London landmarks; Chelsea Gardens is an example.

Remnants of the town's past are still apparent with, for example, the fifteenth century Parish Church of All Saints (formerly St Michaels) with an excellent example of a Norman tower and the former Squire's residence of Houghton Hall, built in the eighteenth century.

Between the late 1960s and the early 1970s, many of the High Street shops were demolished along with a chapel to make way for industrial units, many of which have since been demolished themselves. The main shop in town was a Wavy Line store, which has since been used as a motorbike and car showroom. A fish and chip shop, Tansley's, was at the entrance to what was the access road into the Co-op Store; the current fish and chip shop on Bedford Road was previously occupied by Georges, a tobacconist and confectioner but in the early 1900s was a public house. In front of the existing closed All Saints Parish Church graveyard, facing onto the High Street, was a row of cottages, once the workhouses, complete with village lock-up at the end of the terrace. The door to the former lock-up can now be found on display at the Stockwood Discovery Centre museum in Luton. The White House, the home of a Miss Freeman, a school teacher and aunt of Gary Cooper, who lived in the town during his youth, plus Jasper Perry's green grocer and Birds bakery stood on the High Street on the opposite side of the road to the church.

== Economy ==
The Townsend Industrial Estate, built on the former farm of the same name, includes the roads of Townsend Farm Road, Portland Close, Blackburn Road, and Westbury Close. To the south of Houghton Hall Park is the Houghton Hall Business Park. Located here are Whitbread, Aldwyck Housing Group, NICEIC Group, Renault Trucks (UK), BRS, ArjoHuntleigh Group. To the south east of this estate is the Lovett Way Woodside estate. Businesses located here include Disability Resource Centre, Centrebus, Hermes, DPD, Premier Cables and Connells Group.

Whitbread PLC, which manages Premier Inn, Beefeater, Brewers Fayre and Table Table, is headquartered on the Houghton Regis/Dunstable industrial estate. Costa Coffee, the world's second largest coffee chain, was acquired from Whitbread in August 2018 for £3.9 billion by The Coca-Cola Company.

The Co-op store was destroyed by fire in June 2006. The store later re-opened on a smaller footprint, but was closed down in 2014, and demolished in 2015. A Morrisons medium-sized supermarket opened in 2012.

== Culture and community ==
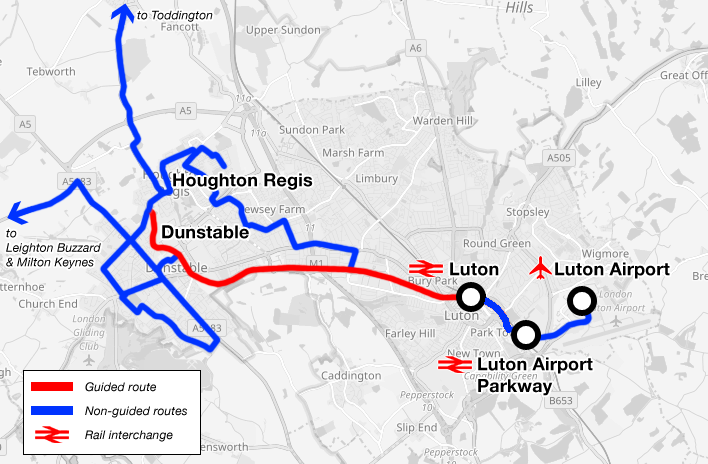
Luton to Houghton Regis busway

Houghton Regis Town Council organises several regular free events every year. These include Pancake Race, Easter Egg Hunt, May Fayre, Carnival, Classic and Vintage Car Show, the latter replaced by Houghton Rocks from 2016 which included the Classic cars and a boot sale with fairground.

The Greenway and the route through Dunstable and Houghton Regis forms part of National Route 6 of the National Cycle Network. This provides walking and cycling routes between Milton Keynes, Luton and London.

Central Bedfordshire Council allowed Stevenage Leisure Limited (who operate the Houghton Regis Leisure Centre as Lifestyles (@) Houghton) to carry out major renovation.

The Luton to Dunstable Busway guided bus system (route pictured) opened in 2013, proving bus rapid transit services from Houghton Regis to Luton Airport via Dunstable and Luton.

Academy Award Winning American Actor Gary Cooper lived, and went to school, in Houghton Regis.

== Education ==
Primary schools in the town include Hawthorn Park Community Primary School, Houghton Regis Primary School, St Vincent's RC Primary School, Thomas Whitehead CE Academy, Thornhill Primary School and Tithe Farm Primary School. Secondary schools serving the area include Houstone School and All Saints Academy. The Chiltern School is a special school which has a campus in Houghton Regis.

Central Bedfordshire College and Bedford College have sites in Houghton Regis, where they offer a range of further education courses.

== Plans for the area ==
=== A5-M1 Link (Dunstable Northern Bypass) ===
A5-M1 Link (Dunstable Northern Bypass)
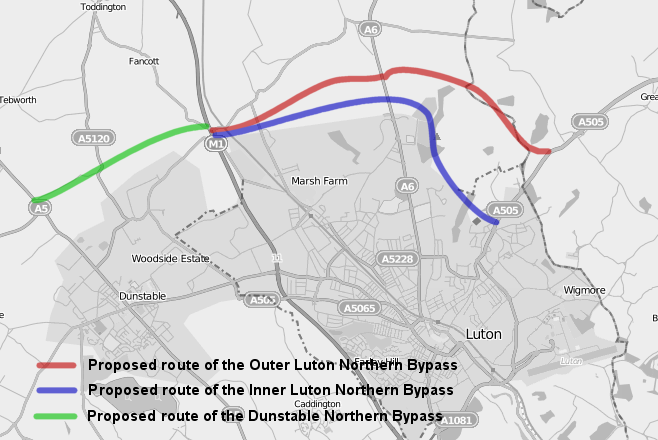
- The route of the Dunstable Northern Bypass proposal and route options for the connecting Luton Northern Bypass.
- Location: Central Bedfordshire
- Proposer: Highways Agency
- Status: Approved
- Type: Road
- Cost estimate: £171 million to £217 million
- Start date: 2014–2015
- Completion date: 2016–2017
- Geometry: KML

The A5 was extended to the M1 at a new junction 11A, and opened on 11 May 2017. Here, it is intended to join with a proposed Luton Northern Bypass to form a northern bypass for the wider conurbation. The new road reduces traffic congestion in Houghton Regis and Dunstable, and reduces journey times for long-distance traffic.

=== Woodside Link ===
The 1.8 mi (2.9 km) A5505 Woodside Link opened on 13 April 2017. It connects the Woodside Estate industrial area of Dunstable and Houghton Regis to Junction 11a of the M1 motorway. The road will also provide access to a new development area north and east of Houghton Regis, where 5,150 new homes are to be built and 30 hectares of employment land are to be developed by 2031. Central Bedfordshire Council delivered the £38.3m road scheme with contributions of £20m from SEMLEP's Local Growth Deal, £5m from the UK government's Local Pinch Point Fund and £1m of developer contributions. Construction started in spring 2015.

=== Houghton Regis North Framework Plan (HRN1) ===
This plan includes a proposed north of Houghton Regis urban extension of 6,950 homes and 83 ha of employment land by 2026 with potential for a further 4,050 homes and 17 ha employment land. In addition, further development is proposed within the existing urban area. Within the Framework Plan, the Houghton Regis Development Consortium are planning for 5,150 homes, employment, retail, infrastructure, community, facilities and leisure on cultivated farmland north of Tithe Farm estate and to the east of Parkside estate.

=== Bidwell West Consortium Group (HRN2) ===
This plan includes an urban extension of Houghton Regis, situated north of Houghton Regis Chalk Quarry, west of Bedford Road, east of the A5, and south of the A5-M1 link road. It will provide up to 1850 new homes, a primary school, employment land and a local centre.

In mid-2018 ECL Civil Engineering was contracted by Bidwell Land Ownership Group, a consortium of local landowners, to deliver the strategic Infrastructure and section 278 works necessary to develop the 166-hectare (410-acre) site which will eventually accommodate nearly 2000 new homes.

== Governance ==
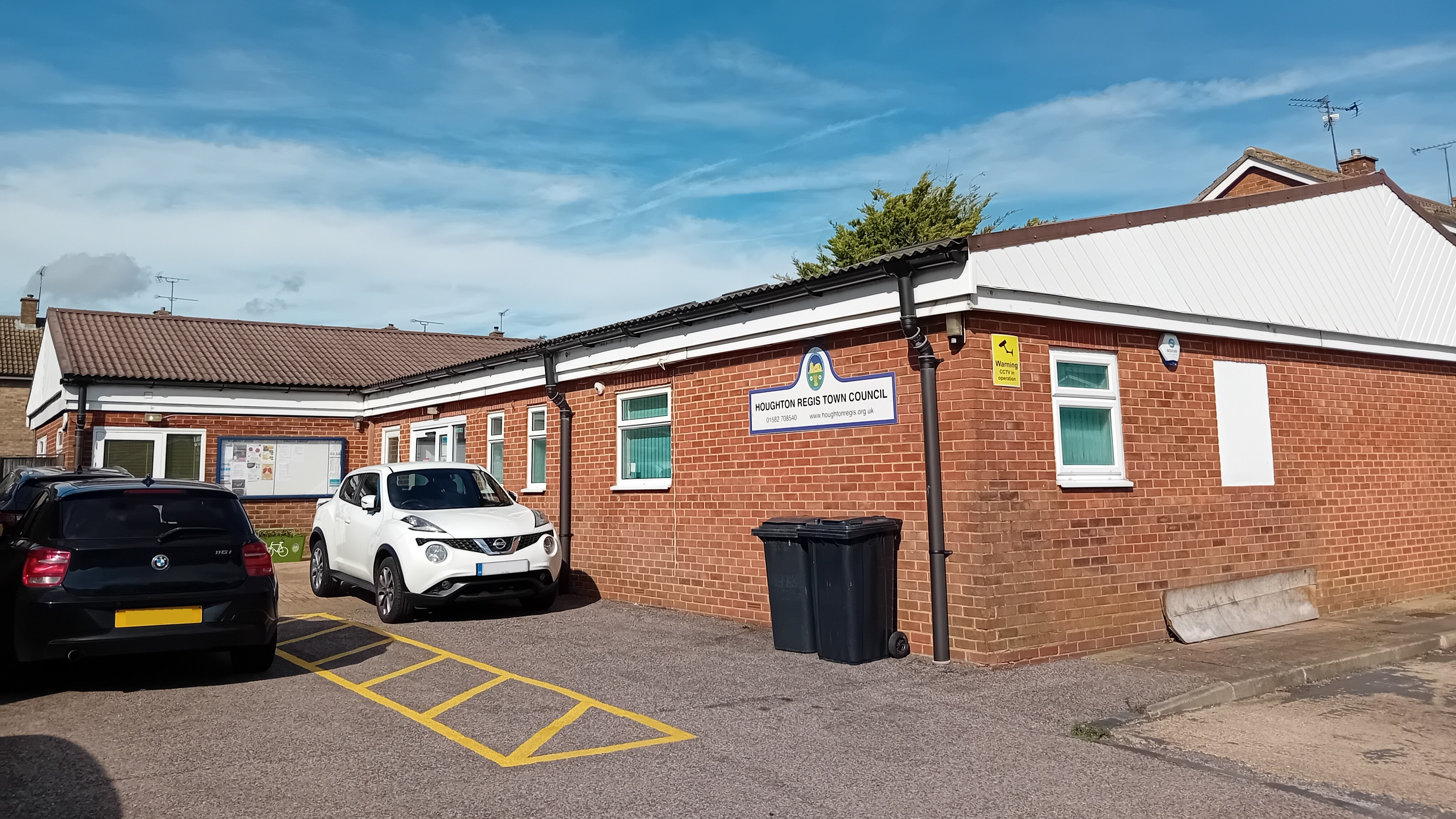
Town Council Offices, Peel Street

There are two tiers of local government covering Houghton Regis, at parish (town) and unitary authority level: Houghton Regis Town Council and Central Bedfordshire Council. The town council has its headquarters at the Council Offices on Peel Street.

== Freedom of the Town ==
The following people and military units have received the Freedom of the Town of Houghton Regis.

=== Individuals ===
- Charles Henry Cooper (September 15, 1865 – September 17, 1946), father of American actor, Gary Cooper, was a British-American justice of the Montana Supreme Court from 1919 to 1924, born in Houghton Regis.
- Robin Hines, Mayor of Houghton Regis 2010-2011: 23 November 2017
- Beryl Morton, Houghton Regis Horticulturist: 13 October 2018
- Jabez Inwards (1817-1880), popular Victorian temperance lecturer and phrenologist

== See also ==
- Regis (Place)
- List of place names with royal patronage in the United Kingdom
