= Stanbridgeford railway station =

Former railway station in England

Coordinates: 51°53′50″N 0°35′30″W

Stanbridgeford

General information
- Location: Stanbridge, Central Bedfordshire; England
- Grid reference: SP970230
- Platforms: 2

Other information
- Status: Disused

History
- Original company: Dunstable & London & Birmingham Railway
- Pre-grouping: London and North Western Railway
- Post-grouping: London, Midland and Scottish Railway; London Midland Region of British Railways

Key dates
- October 1849: Opened
- 2 July 1962: Closed to passengers
- 1 June 1964: Closed to goods
Location

Stanbridgeford railway station on the London and North Western Railway's branch line to Dunstable served the Bedfordshire villages of Stanbridge, Totternhoe, Eaton Bray and Tilsworth from 1849 to 1964. Once popular with visitors to the nearby Totternhoe Knolls and ramblers, the station closed against a background of falling passenger numbers and declining freight returns. The station building has survived into private ownership, but a section of the alignment to the east and west of the site has been taken into the A505 Leighton Southern Bypass. National Cycle Network route 6 runs to the east over the bypass as far as the outskirts of Dunstable.

== History ==
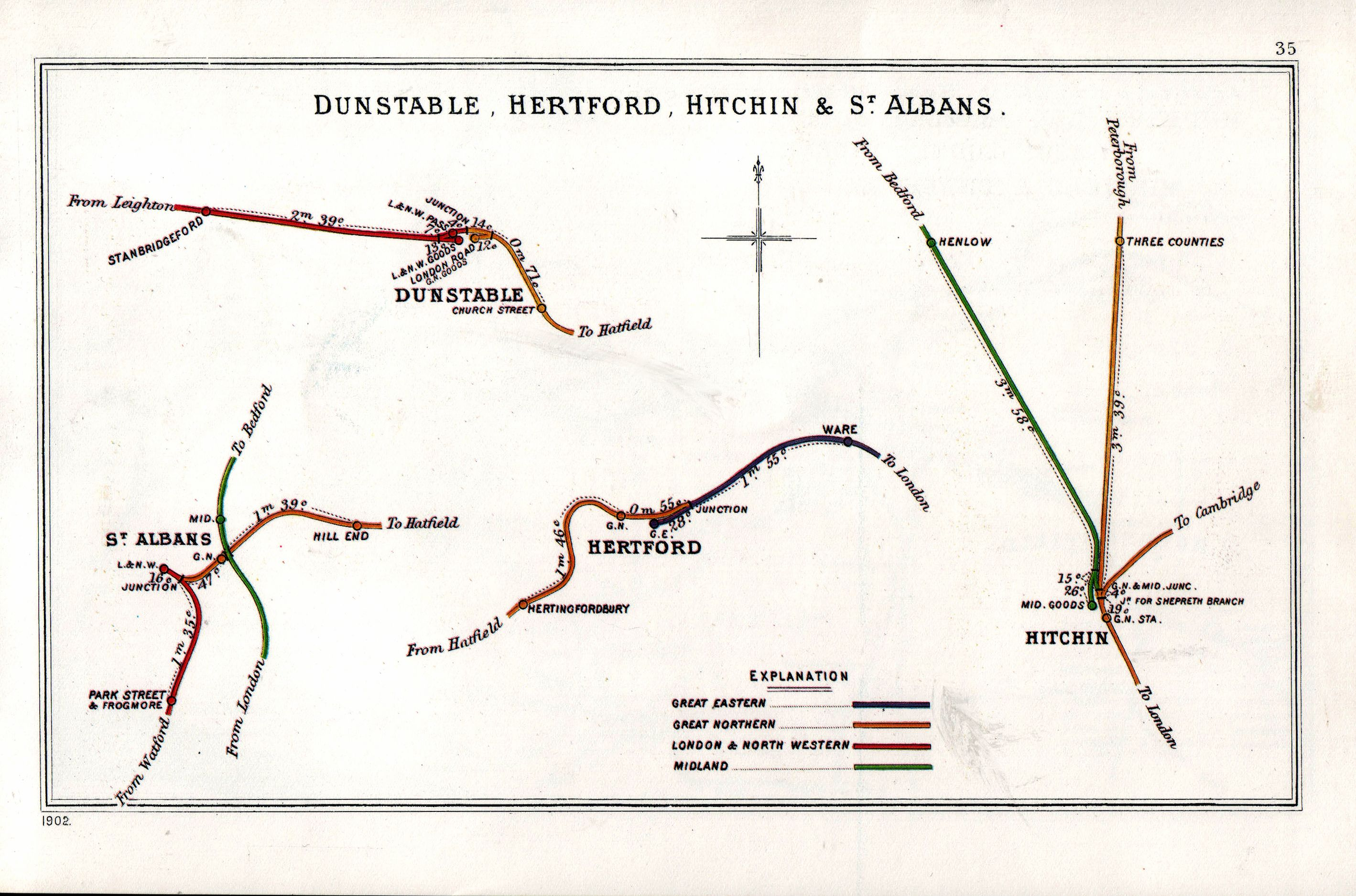
A 1902 Railway Clearing House map of railways in the vicinity of Stanbridgeford (upper left)

The passing of the Dunstable & London & Birmingham Railway Act on 30 June 1845 authorised the construction of a short branch line from Leighton Buzzard to connect Dunstable, and eventually Luton, with the London and Birmingham's main line. The proposals were devised by George and Robert Stephenson. The line opened for freight on 29 May 1848 and to passengers on 1 June. Stanbridgeford was the only intermediate station between Leighton Buzzard and Dunstable and opened to passengers in October 1849, more than a year after the line's opening. The station did not however appear in public timetables until October 1860, at which time two facing platforms made of old stone sleepers were provided. The opening of the station to goods traffic followed on 3 October 1860. The nearest settlement to the station was Stanbridge (then known as Stanbridgeford), although it was within reach of the villages of Totternhoe, Eaton Bray and Tilsworth. It became popular with visitors to the nearby Totternhoe Knolls, especially with Leighton Buzzard residents who took in great numbers to the countryside, so much so that in 1919 when 700 people arrived to take the train back from Stanbridgeford, the stationmaster had to call for extra coaches from Leighton Buzzard.

The station was situated to the west of a level crossing across Station Road. The station building house was adjacent to the crossing on the down side and wooden passenger waiting shelters were provided on each platform. An eight-lever LNWR ground frame controlled the points, signals and level crossing. Just to the east of Stanbridgeford lay a siding serving the Tottenhoe Lime & Stone Company Quarries. Increased traffic led to new sidings and a crossover being installed in 1916; the connection was controlled by a signal box containing a seven-lever ground frame. Passenger traffic over the Dunstable branch in its later years was not great except on market days, and Stanbridgeford was closed to passengers in 1962 and to goods in 1964. Tracklifting from Stanbridgeford to Billington Road began in February 1970 and the line as far as Leighton Buzzard had been entirely lifted by February 1971. Prior to tracklifting, an episode of The Avengers was filmed at the station in October 1968. The episode was called 'Noon Doomsday' and the station was renamed 'Langs Halt' for the filming.

| Preceding station | Disused railways | Following station |
|---|---|---|
| Leighton Buzzard Line closed, station open | London and North Western Railway; Dunstable Branch Line | Dunstable North Line and station closed |

== Present day ==
The station building, now known as Stanbridgeford House, has survived as a private residence and the platform area has been incorporated into the garden. In 1991, the A505 Leighton Southern Bypass opened and reused a section of the railway alignment from a point to the west of the former station to a point to the north-west of Billington. The line to the east is also severed by the road. The signal box which controlled access to Tottenhoe Lime siding was moved in January 1969 to the Leighton Buzzard Light Railway. What remains of the line to the east has become part of the 3.5 km (2.2 mi) Sewell greenaway as far as French's Avenue in Dunstable. The route is part of National Cycle Network route 6 and includes a bridge over the A505.

== Sources ==
- Butt, R. V. J. (October 1995). The Directory of Railway Stations: details every public and private passenger station, halt, platform and stopping place, past and present (1st ed.). Sparkford: Patrick Stephens Ltd. ISBN 978-1-85260-508-7. OCLC 60251199. OL 11956311M.
- Clinker, C.R. (October 1978). Clinker's Register of Closed Passenger Stations and Goods Depots in England, Scotland and Wales 1830-1977. Bristol: Avon-Anglia Publications & Services. ISBN 0-905466-19-5.
- Croughton, Godfrey; Kidner, R. W.; Young, Alan (1982). Private and Untimetabled Railway Stations: Halts and Stopping Places. Trowbridge, Wilts.: The Oakwood Press. ISBN 0-85361-281-1.
- Davies, R.T.; Grant, M.D. (1984) [1975]. Forgotten Railways: Chilterns and Cotswolds (Vol. 3). Newton Abbot, Devon: David St John Thomas. ISBN 0-946537-07-0.
- Leleux, Robin (1984) [1976]. A Regional History of the Railways of Great Britain: The East Midlands (Volume 9). Newton Abbot, Devon: David St. John Thomas. ISBN 978-0-946537-06-8.
- Oppitz, Leslie (2000). Lost Railways of the Chilterns (Lost Railways Series). Newbury, Berkshire: Countryside Books. ISBN 978-1-85306-643-6.
- Shannon, Paul (1996) [1995]. British Railways Past and Present: Buckinghamshire, Bedfordshire and West Hertfordshire (No. 24). Wadenhoe, Peterborough: Past & Present Publishing Ltd. ISBN 978-1-85895-073-0.
- Simpson, Bill (1998). The Dunstable Branch. Witney, Oxon: Lamplight Publications. ISBN 978-1-899246-03-8.
- Woodward, Sue; Woodward, Geoff (May 2008). Branch Line to Dunstable from Leighton Buzzard to Hatfield. Midhurst, West Sussex: Middleton Press. ISBN 978-1-906008-27-7.
- Woodward, Sue; Woodward, Geoff (1994). The Hatfield, Luton and Dunstable Railway (Locomotion Papers No. 44). Headington, Oxford: The Oakwood Press. ISBN 978-0-85361-458-6.
