= Dunstable Town railway station =

Former railway station in England

Coordinates: 51.8869°N 0.5110°W

Dunstable Town
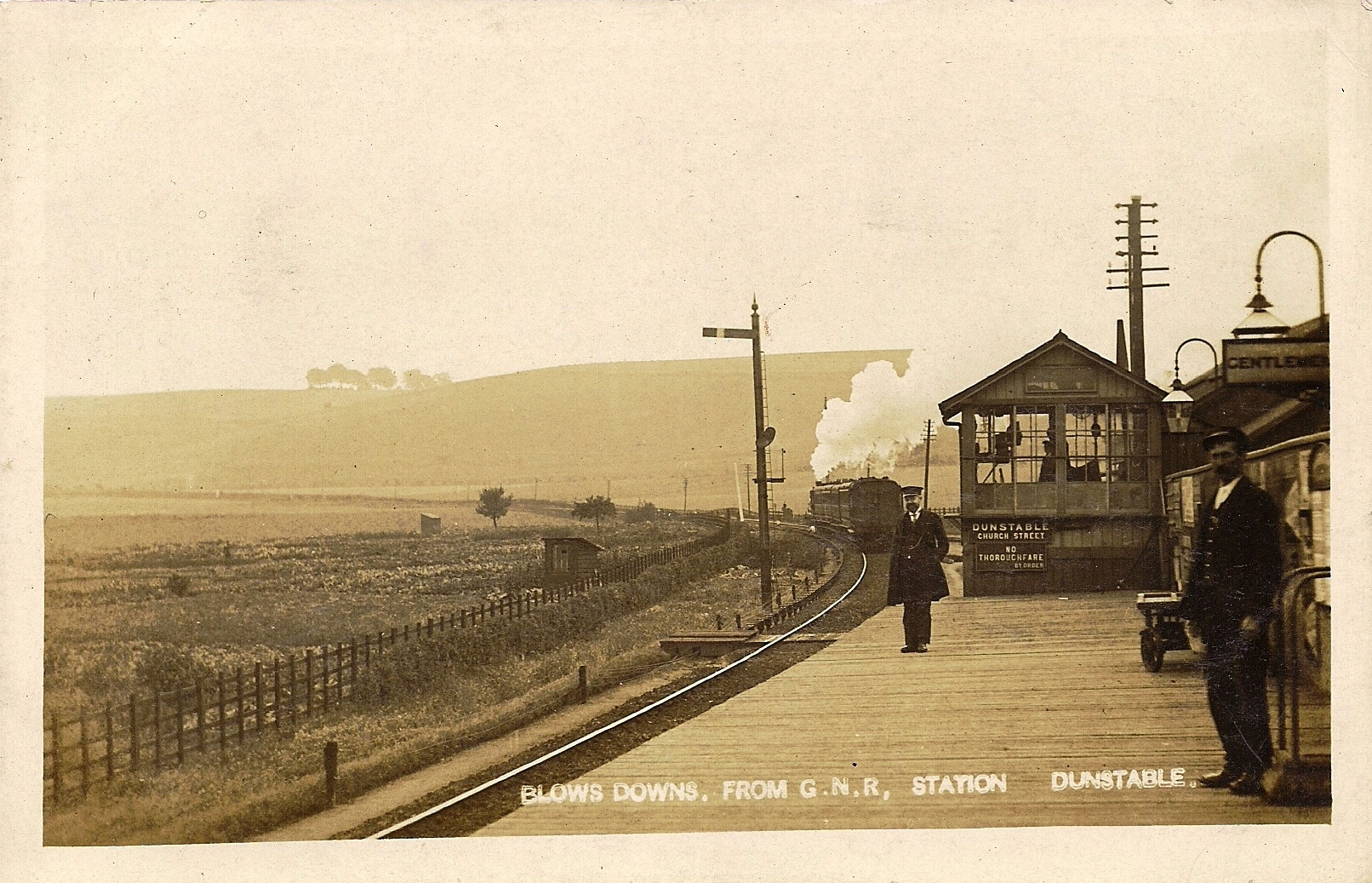

General information
- Location: Dunstable, Central Bedfordshire; England
- Grid reference: TL026219
- Platforms: 1

Other information
- Status: Disused

History
- Original company: Luton, Dunstable and Welwyn Junction Railway
- Pre-grouping: Hertford, Luton and Dunstable Railway; Great Northern Railway
- Post-grouping: London and North Eastern Railway; London Midland Region of British Railways

Key dates
- 3 May 1858: Opened as Dunstable Church Street
- 1 January 1927: Renamed Dunstable Town
- 7 December 1964: Goods facilities withdrawn
- 26 April 1965: Closed to passenger traffic
- 17 January 1987: Last train calls at station
Location

Dunstable Town, also known as Dunstable Church Street, was a railway station on the Great Northern Railway's branch line from Welwyn which served Dunstable in Bedfordshire from 1858 to 1965. Against a background of falling passenger numbers and declining freight returns, the station closed to passengers in 1965 and to goods in 1964, a casualty of the Beeching Axe. The station site is now in use as part of the Luton to Dunstable Busway.

== History ==
The Luton, Dunstable and Welwyn Junction Railway (LD&WJR) was authorised on 16 July 1855 and empowered the construction of a 5 miles 45 chains (9.0 kilometres) line from Dunstable to join the Great Northern Railway's (GNR) main line at Digswell. The line would run from a junction near the London and North Western Railway's (LNWR) Dunstable station across the road now known as the A5 to a second station in Dunstable at Church Street. Finding itself in financial difficulties, the LD&WJR merged with the Hertford and Welwyn Junction Railway on 28 June 1858, thereby creating the Hertford, Luton and Dunstable Railway. The line opened between Dunstable and Luton to goods traffic on 5 April 1858, to passengers on 3 May and throughout to Welwyn on 1 September 1860. Trains were worked for two years by the LNWR after which the GNR took over, eventually acquiring the line on 12 June 1861.

The opening date of the station in Church Street, Dunstable, is disputed; sources differ between 1858 and 1860. In any event, it appears that the station may have opened as a consequence of the failure by the LNWR and GNR to agree terms for a joint station in Dunstable. The initial station was a simple timber-built structure with a single platform which proved unsuitable to handle the line's traffic and which soon generated numerous complaints from passengers. The GNR, whose Church Street station was more convenient for the town centre than the LNWR's Dunstable station, offered to rebuild the station so that it could also be used by the LNWR but the latter insisted on having equal rights of access which was unacceptable to the GNR. Following a fire in September 1871, a more permanent structure was provided at a cost of £1,500 (equivalent to £170,000 in 2023).

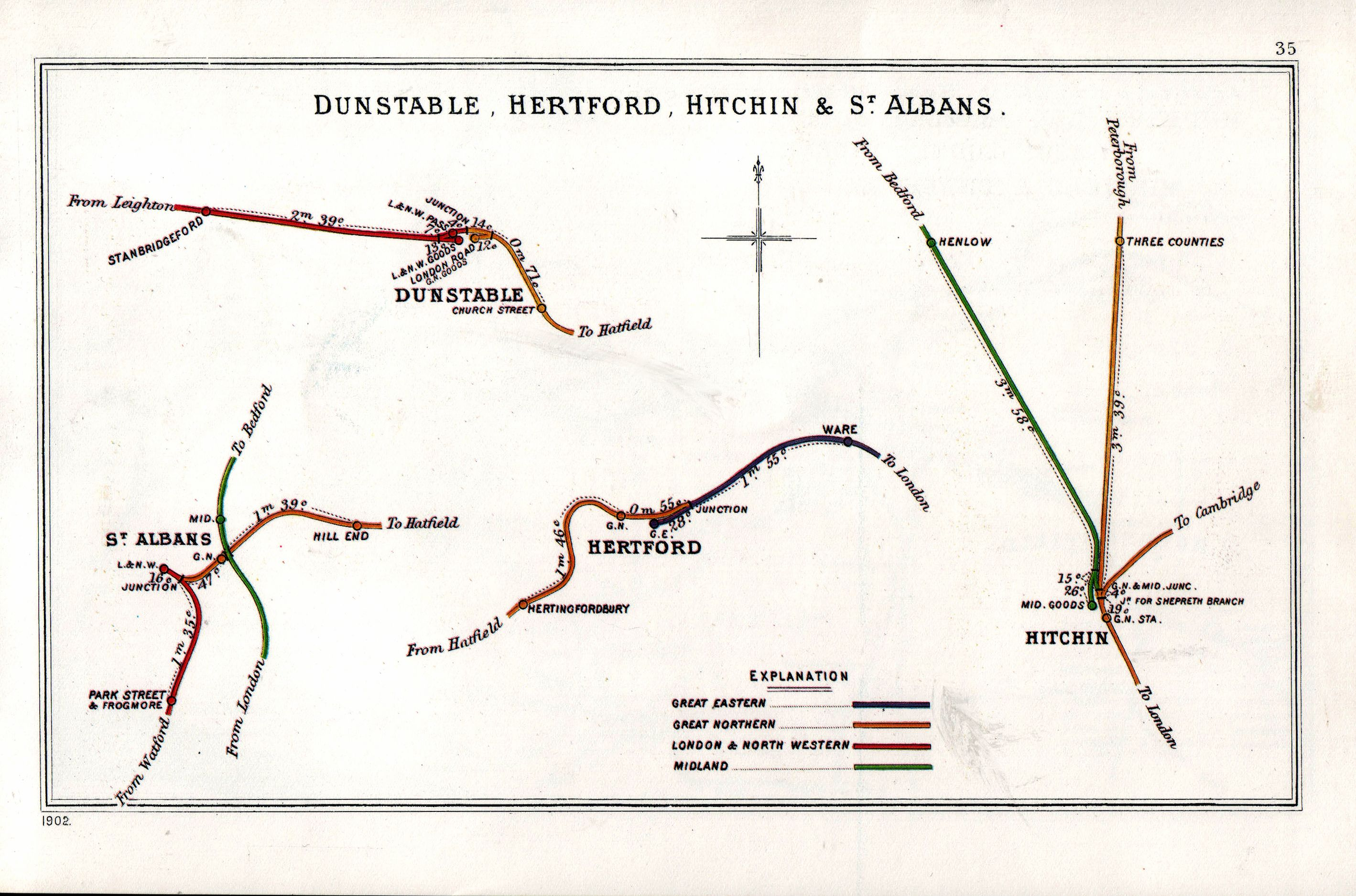
A 1902 Railway Clearing House map of railways in the vicinity of Dunstable Town (upper left, shown here in orange as Church Street)

The new station also had a single platform which was situated on the Down side immediately above the A505 Luton-Dunstable road. The main station building comprised two floors: the entrance and station booking office were on the lower floor while the main station facilities at platform level which were reached by steps. Following the extension of the platform in November 1890, a signal box was situated on the platform which had views over the countryside towards Skimpot and Blows Down. The box remained in operation until 22 July 1934. Two sidings ran down the centre of the goods yard behind the station. These received coal for local traders and handled scrap iron for the dealer who occupied part of the goods yard.

Passenger traffic over the Dunstable branch in its later years was not great except on market days, and Dunstable Town, as it became known after January 1927, was closed to goods traffic in 1964 and to passengers in 1965 after it was listed for closure in the Beeching report. The line north to Leighton Buzzard closed from 1 January 1966, with tracklifting at Dunstable beginning in 1968.

Preceding station	Disused railways	Following station
Dunstable North	Great Northern Railway; Dunstable Branch Line	Chaul End

== Present day ==
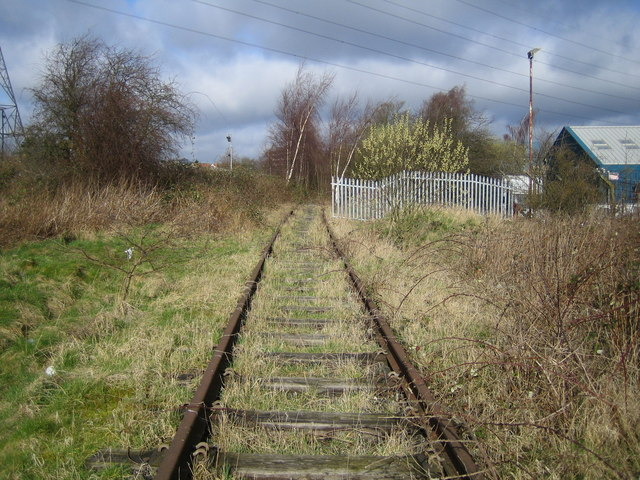
View north-west towards the site of Dunstable Town station in April 2006.

Dunstable Town's wooden platform and platform canopy were dismantled after closure, although the station building remained for some time afterwards. The former goods yard was used to store pipes for oil and gas pipelines. The sidings were disconnected and the controlling ground frame was taken out of use on 7 March 1969. The scrap yard occupying part of the goods yard had closed by the early 1990s, leaving the site to be used as a car park until it was redeveloped for housing in 2008. The line remained open for oil traffic until 30 April 1989 when it was mothballed and then officially closed on 28 March 1991. This allowed one last passenger train – the Chiltern Chariot railtour – to call at Dunstable Town on 17 January 1987, although passengers were not allowed to alight. The track was finally lifted in autumn 2010 to allow the construction of the Luton to Dunstable Busway which now passes through the site. The plot of land when the station building used to be is now the Dukeminster Court for assisted living which opened in 2015.

Dunstable is presently one of the largest towns in south-east England without a railway connection.

The station was immortalised in 1964 in the song "Slow Train" by Flanders and Swann.
