= Municipal Borough of Dunstable =

History of Bedfordshire

Coordinates: 51.886°N 0.522°W

Dunstable
- Municipal Borough
- Population
  - 1881: 4,627
  - 1971: 31,570
- History
  - Created: 8 December 1864
  - Abolished: 31 March 1974
  - Succeeded by: South Bedfordshire
- Status: Ancient borough (c.1132 - after 1541); Local Government District (1863–1864); Municipal borough (1864–1974)
  - HQ: Dunstable
- Contained within
  - County Council: Bedfordshire
- Map of boundary as of 1971

The town of Dunstable in Bedfordshire, England was governed as an ancient borough between the twelfth century and the sixteenth century. The town’s borough status was effectively lost after 1541, following the English Reformation. Urban local government returned to the town in 1863 with the establishment of a local board. The following year borough status was restored to the town when it was made a municipal borough.

Dunstable Borough was abolished in 1974, merging with other districts to become South Bedfordshire.

== Formation ==
Dunstable’s original borough status was linked to Dunstable Priory. The priory was founded by Henry I around 1132, and he endowed it with the manor and borough of Dunstable. The town was therefore effectively controlled by the priory and was an important source of income for it. Disputes arose several times, especially during the thirteenth century, as to the extent of the borough’s independence. The sheriffs of Bedford and various judges tried to treat the town like other parts of Bedfordshire, as though it had no borough privileges. The priory successfully resisted such attempts to deny its liberties. The priory also sought to strengthen its position by obtaining new charters from the king, which it did eight times between 1227 and 1462.

Dunstable Priory was dissolved in 1541 in the dissolution of the monasteries. The rights the priory had held over the borough passed to the king. Unlike the priory, the king had nothing to gain by guarding the town’s independence as a borough. An attempt by the town’s constable to claim that the sheriff of Bedford still had to observe the old liberties of the borough led to the constable being put in the stocks and then Bedford Gaol, along with others who resisted the sheriff’s authority. The king’s rights over Dunstable were combined with other crown possessions in the area into the Honour of Ampthill in 1542, after which time Dunstable came to be regarded as a manor rather than a borough. The old borough was therefore not explicitly abolished, but it effectively ceased to operate.

For the next three hundred years the town was governed by the parish and county authorities, in the same way as most rural areas. When Poor Law Unions were established following the New Poor Law of 1834, the parish of Dunstable was included in the Luton union. When the Municipal Corporations Act 1835 reformed borough corporations in the country, Dunstable was not included amongst the boroughs which were reformed.

In 1863 the town sought to re-establish a form of urban local government for itself. This was in reaction to the Highways Act 1862, which would have led to the town being grouped into a highway district with other parishes for the purposes of maintaining roads. Under the act, towns which had borough status or local boards were not to be grouped into highways districts. Dunstable’s churchwardens, ratepayers and owners met and resolved on 19 March 1863 that the town should become a Local Government District governed by a Local Board. The new status took effect two months later, on 19 May 1863. Elections for the new body were then held and the new board’s first meeting was on 23 June 1863 at the Town Hall. The board’s first chairman was William Elliott.

Less than a year after the formation of the Local Board, the town petitioned Queen Victoria for a charter to become a borough. This was partly on the basis that the town’s former borough status had never been abolished, merely allowed to lapse, and partly on the basis that the town was larger than a number of places which did have borough status. In April 1864 it was announced that the Privy Council would examine Dunstable’s case. The following August it was confirmed that a new borough charter would be issued. The charter was drawn up and came into force on 8 December 1864, incorporating the parish of Dunstable as a Municipal Borough. The first election was held in March 1865. The first mayor of the new borough was Charles Stockdale Benning, and the first meeting of the new council was held on 28 March 1865 at Dunstable Town Hall. The old Local Board’s functions were incorporated into those of the borough council.

== Premises ==
A market hall had been built in Dunstable in 1803 by the Duke of Bedford, who owned the manorial rights at the time. It stood on High Street North (later being given the number 11 High Street North), near the crossroads at the centre of the town, and was known as Town Hall by the time the Local Board was formed. This building was used for meetings by the Local Board from 1863 and then the borough council from 1865. To celebrate the town’s new borough status a clock tower was added in 1869, and the building was substantially altered and enlarged in 1873 to incorporate a corn exchange, plait hall and town hall.

On 17 December 1879 the Town Hall was completely destroyed by fire. Work began on a new hall on the same site almost immediately, and the rebuilt Town Hall opened in November 1880. This Town Hall remained the council’s meeting place until 1964.

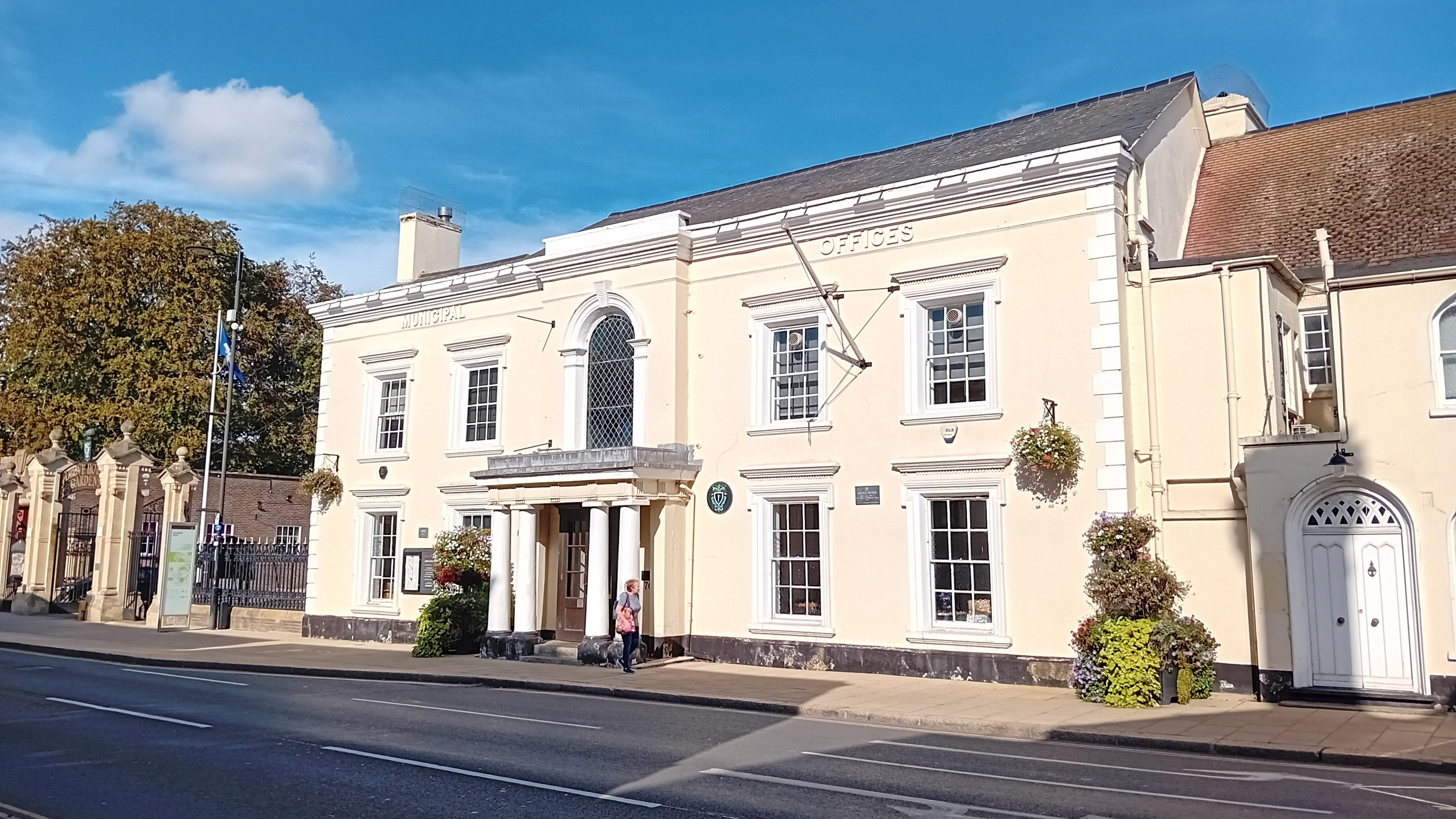
Grove House, 76 High Street North: acquired by Dunstable Borough Council in 1936, later used by South Bedfordshire District Council and Dunstable Town Council.

The council acquired Grove House at 76 High Street North in 1936, using the house as office space and turning the gardens into a public park for the town. The council then also acquired Priory House at 33 High Street South in 1956 for additional office space.

In 1964 a new Civic Hall was opened at Queensway, off High Street North, later renamed Queensway Hall. The old Town Hall on High Street North was demolished in 1966.

== Abolition ==
Dunstable Borough Council was abolished under the Local Government Act 1972, merging with other districts to become part of the new South Bedfordshire District on 1 April 1974. The borough council’s old offices at Grove House and Priory House continued to be used as offices of the new South Bedfordshire District Council. No successor parish was created for Dunstable at the time of the 1974 changes, but a Dunstable Town Council was later created, coming into operation on 1 April 1985. The town council shared Grove House with South Bedfordshire District Council until the district council moved to new offices on the site of the former Dunstable North railway station in 1989.
