= Chaul End railway station =

Temporary rail stop in England

Coordinates: 51.8880°N 0.4564°W

Chaul End
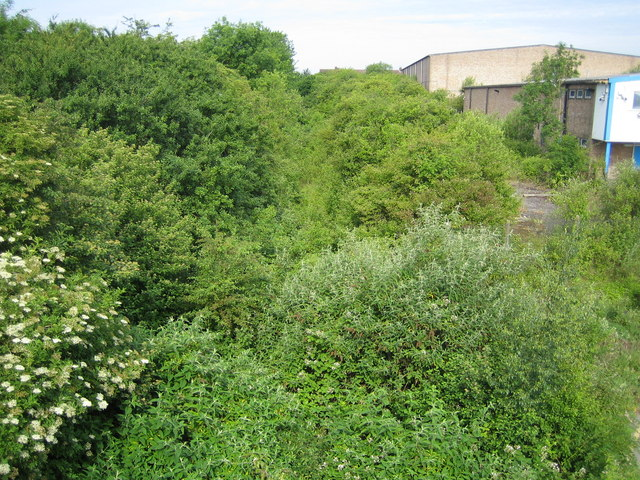
- Near the station site in 2006

General information
- Location: Chaul End, Luton; England
- Grid reference: TL063222
- Platforms: 1

Other information
- Status: Disused

History
- Original company: Great Northern Railway

Key dates
- 1914/1915: Opened
- 1919/1920: Closed
Location

Chaul End was a temporary railway halt on the Great Northern Railway's branch line from Welwyn which served a munitions factory near Luton during the First World War. The station site has been reused as part of the Luton to Dunstable Busway.

== History ==
On 12 June 1861, the Great Northern Railway acquired the Hertford, Luton and Dunstable Railway's line from Dunstable Church Street station to Luton Bute Street station, which had opened to goods traffic on 5 April 1858 and to passengers on 3 May.

From Luton Bute Street station, the line headed westwards through Luton passing Kenilworth Road stadium and Laporte's chemical works before reaching a level crossing at Chaul End. A small timber 10-lever signal box was located here on the Up side of the line with a gatekeeper's house standing opposite. The crossing was protected by a home and distant signal in each direction; the distant being an upper quadrant signal while the home was a somersault signal.

As part of the First World War war effort, a factory at Chaul End was taken over for the manufacture of shells. A temporary halt to serve the factory was opened in 1914 or 1915 The station is believed to have been situated to the east of the level crossing. Munitions workers using the station could be easily recognised by the orange-yellow dust from the powder with which shells were filled. London and North Western Railway trains also called at the station from 28 February 1916; tickets to the station showed it as "Luton (Chaul End)". The factory itself was served by a siding capable of accommodating five wagons, which was taken out of use on 20 April 1916.

The station closed in either 1919 or 1920, and was demolished soon afterwards.

Preceding station	Disused railways	Following station
Dunstable Town	Great Northern Railway; Dunstable Branch Line	Luton Bute Street

== Present day ==
The signal box at Chaul End remained in use until 1 November 1969, following which it was boarded up and the gatekeeper's house opposite demolished. The level crossing remained in use until the 1980s when it was replaced by a bridge carrying the road over the line.

The line remained open until oil traffic on the line ceased on 30 April 1989 when it was mothballed and then officially closed on 28 March 1991.

The Luton to Dunstable Busway passes through the site.
