= Chiltern Green =

Hamlet in Bedfordshire, England

Coordinates: 51.86059°N 0.35328°W

- Location within Bedfordshire
- OS grid reference: TL134192
- Civil parish: Hyde
- Unitary authority: Central Bedfordshire
- Ceremonial county: Bedfordshire
- Region: East
- Country: England
- Sovereign state: United Kingdom
- Post town: LUTON
- Postcode district: LU2
- Dialling code: 01582
- Police: Bedfordshire
- Fire: Bedfordshire
- Ambulance: East of England
- UK Parliament: Luton South

Chiltern Green is a hamlet located in Bedfordshire, England, next to the border with Hertfordshire. It is in the civil parish of Hyde.

The settlement lent its name to Chiltern Green railway station, which was located in nearby New Mill End. The railway station closed in 1952. Today London Luton Airport is located to the north west of Chiltern Green.
