= Leighton Buzzard railway station =

Railway station in Bedfordshire, England

Coordinates: 51.91631°N 0.67700°W

Leighton Buzzard
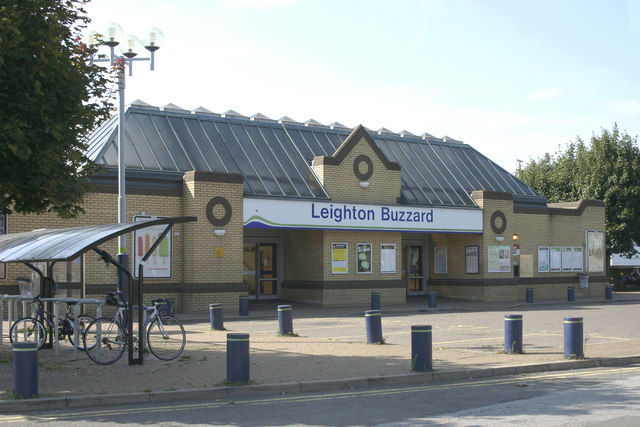

General information
- Location: Linslade, Central Bedfordshire; England
- Grid reference: SP910250
- Manager: London Northwestern Railway
- Platforms: 4

Other information
- Station code: LBZ
- Classification: DfT category C2

History
- Original company: London and Birmingham Railway

Key dates
- 9 April 1838: Opened as Leighton
- 14 February 1859: Rebuilt 160m to the south
- 1 July 1911: Renamed Leighton Buzzard
- 6 February 1967: Goods services withdrawn
- September 1989: Rebuilt

Passengers
- 2021/22: ▲0.906 million
- 2022/23: ▲1.143 million
- 2023/24: ▲1.315 million
- 2024/25: ▲1.524 million
- 2025/26: ▲1.563 million
Location
Notes
- Passenger statistics from the Office of Rail and Road

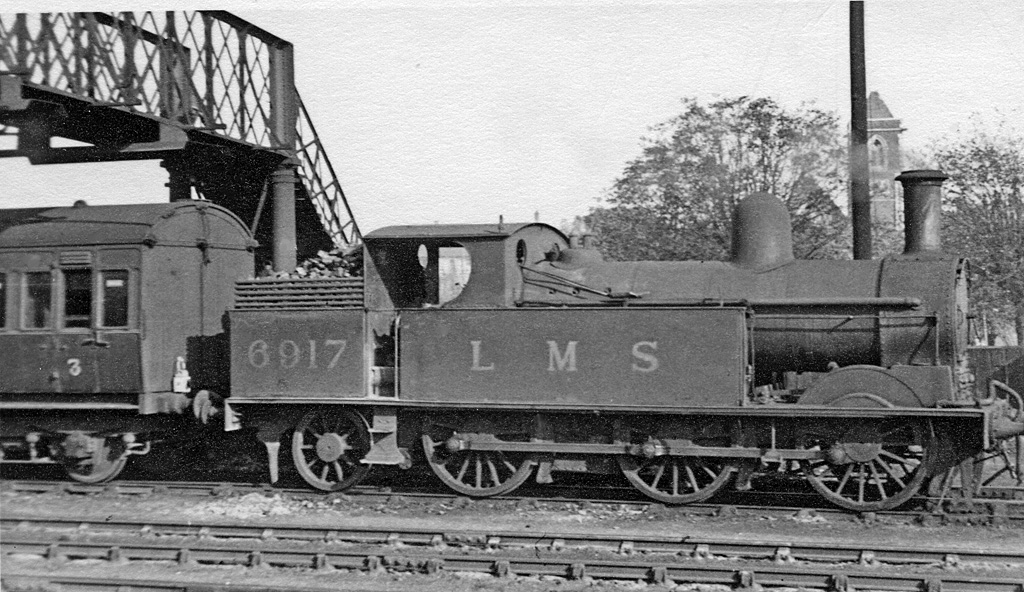
The station in 1948

Leighton Buzzard railway station serves the towns of Leighton Buzzard and Linslade in the county of Bedfordshire and nearby areas of Buckinghamshire. Actually situated in Linslade, the station is 40 miles (64 km) north west of London Euston and is served by London Northwestern Railway services on the West Coast Main Line. Until the 1960s the station was the start of a branch to Dunstable and Luton, with a junction just north of the present station. The station has four platforms. Platforms 3 & 4 are served by London Northwestern Railway's services to/from London Euston.

== History ==
The first station simply known as 'Leighton' was opened by the London and Birmingham Railway on 9 April 1838, as part of the first section of its line from London Euston to Denbigh Hall. The line had originally been planned to pass through Buckingham but opposition from the Duke of Buckingham ensured that it was forced east along the Ouzel valley. Local opposition in Leighton Buzzard then forced it west, necessitating a tunnel through the Greensand Ridge. Leighton Station was built half a mile west of the town and led to the development of modern Linslade, a mile south of the old settlement (renamed Old Linslade).

A station with two facing platforms and wooden buildings was opened about 20 chains (400 m) south of the Linslade tunnels. It lay between a bridge carrying the road to Soulbury over the railway and a level crossing with the road from Leighton to Southcott (subsequently named "Old Road").

In May 1848, the station became a junction when a branch line to Dunstable was opened. In November 1857 a southbound goods train ran into a branch-line train waiting at the station. The Board of Trade insisted that a separate platform be constructed for branch-line trains. At the same time, the railway was under pressure from increasing traffic on the main lines. The London and North Western Railway decided to build a goods relief line from Bletchley to Primrose Hill.

The relief goods line and the extra platform for the branch line were not compatible with a level crossing adjacent to the station. The crossing was closed, the bridge over the railway for the road to Soulbury was widened and a new road was constructed on the western side of the railway to take diverted vehicular traffic. To the south, a footbridge was built over the railway lines to carry the footpath from Southcott to Leighton, which had been recorded on Robert Stephenson's 1833 plan for the railway.

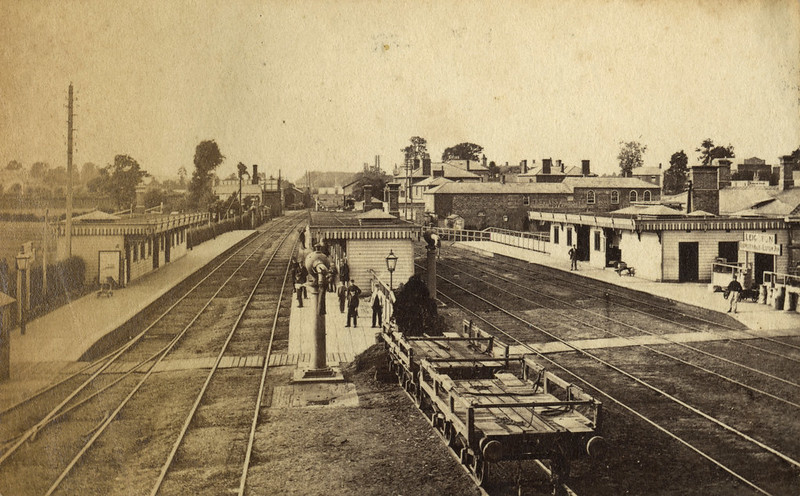
Leighton station from the south c.1865

A single-track eastern bore was added to the two-track Linslade tunnel and a new station with a brick main building was built eight chains (160m) to the south of the original station. Opening in February 1859, this had an imposing frontage on the east side featuring arched windows and the entrance. At the rear was the (sole) platform for the Dunstable branch line. A tunnel from the main building connected passengers to the platforms to the west for the passenger lines to and from London. Between the London passenger lines and the Dunstable branch line were two goods tracks (see photo of the station c.1865).

Access to the Dunstable branch was controlled by Leighton No. 2 signal box situated to the north of the station, while the actual branch signals were controlled by the main line box to the south.

Between 1872 and 1874 a single-track western bore was added to the two bores of the Linslade tunnels as part of the addition of a second, northbound goods line. The station was reconfigured with a pair of tracks added on the west side. There were now two pairs of tracks to and from London with platforms 8 chains long and a single platform 3 chains long for the Dunstable branch.

In 1874, land was purchased to the south of the station alongside the Dunstable branch for the construction of goods sidings, which eventually became known as 'Wing Yard'.

The LNWR was absorbed by the London, Midland and Scottish Railway in the 1923 railway grouping and, in 1927, it added a crossover between the fast (formerly passenger) and slow (formerly goods) lines. This was to play a significant role in the derailment of Royal Scot No. 6114 "Coldstream Guardsman" at Linslade on 22 March 1931 when the driver took the crossover at 50–60 mph (80–100 km/h) instead of the regulation 15 mph (24 km/h). There had been a diversion in place on the fast lines and the driver had missed the warning signals. The engine overturned and six people were killed, including the driver and fireman. The Scotland amateur football team was on the train, but remained unscathed.

In 1957–1958 the platform buildings were rebuilt and a concrete awning placed over the platform. At the entrance a larger booking / waiting hall, central heating, electric lighting and the cycle storage, parcels and loading bay were improved.

The Great Train Robbery of 1963 occurred just south of this station, at Bridego Bridge near Ledburn, at a bridge on the southbound stretch towards Cheddington. Wing Yard was closed in February 1967 and it is now used as a car park, while the branch to Dunstable was closed from June.

In 1989, the platforms were lengthened to accommodate 12-coach trains and a £1.8m project to rebuild the station was started. With the closure of the line to Dunstable, the new station building occupies the space where the old platforms and lines to Dunstable lay. The tunnel connecting the booking office to the platforms was replaced by a bridge to the south of the new station building, which was opened in1992. A new footbridge with lifts, funded by the Department for Transport ‘Access for All’ programme, was constructed in 2014 to the north of the station building.

When the footbridge to the south of the station building was constructed c.1990, it had additional flights of steps which made it accessible from outside the platform area (so there are no ticket barriers at the station). There followed a first attempt to close the public footpath across the railway which had been recorded on Robert Stephenson's 1833 plan and for which the London and North Western Railway had built a bridge when rebuilding the station in 1859. This was rejected by South Bedfordshire District Council and the Planning Inspector at a subsequent appeal.

In 2019, Network Rail declared that the bridge for the public footpath was unsafe and demolished it; the public right of way was temporarily diverted over the southern station footbridge. In July 2024, Network Rail proposed to divert the public footpath over the northern station footbridge. Central Bedfordshire Council rejected this and initiated legal action against Network Rail for obstruction of the footpath.

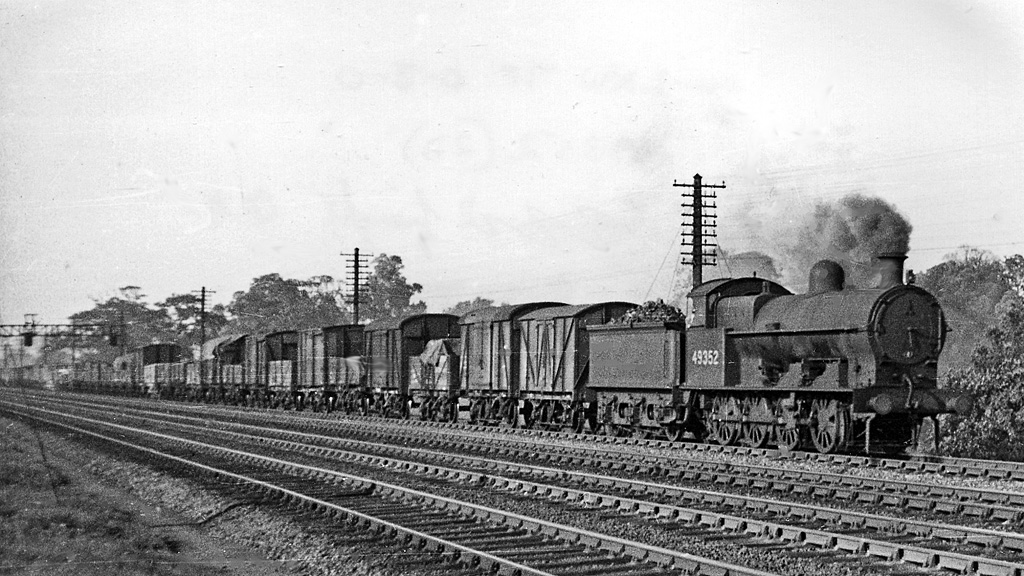
Up freight approaching Linslade Tunnel in 1948

=== Motive power depot ===
The London and North Western Railway opened a small motive power depot at the south end of the station in 1859. This was reroofed in 1957 but closed 5 November 1962 and was demolished.

== Services ==
=== Current services ===
All services at Leighton Buzzard are operated by London Northwestern Railway.

The typical off-peak service in trains per hour is:

- 4 tph to London Euston (2 of these are stopping services, 1 calls at Watford Junction only and 1 runs non-stop)
- 2 tph to Milton Keynes Central
- 2 tph to Birmingham New Street via Northampton

During the peak hours, the station is served by a number of additional services between London Euston and Bletchley.

=== Former services ===
==== Connex South Central ====
In June 1997, Connex South Central began operating services between Gatwick Airport and Rugby via the Brighton and West London Lines that called at Leighton Buzzard with Class 319s. It was cut back to terminate at Milton Keynes in December 2000 before being withdrawn in May 2002 due to capacity constraints on the West Coast Main Line while the latter was being upgraded.

==== Southern ====
Southern reintroduced the service in February 2009 with Class 377s operating initially operating from Brighton to Milton Keynes before being curtailed at its southern end at South Croydon and later Clapham Junction. In May 2022, Southern cut the service back to terminate at Watford Junction, where passengers for Leighton Buzzard may transfer to a London Northwestern service.

Preceding station	National Rail	Following station
Bletchley towards Birmingham New Street	London Northwestern Railway London–Birmingham	Watford Junction towards London Euston
Bletchley towards Milton Keynes Central	London Northwestern Railway London–Milton Keynes	Cheddington towards London Euston
Former services
Bletchley	Southern West London Line	Tring
	Disused railways	
Terminus	London and North Western Railway Dunstable Branch Line	Stanbridgeford Line and station closed

== Interchange ==
Leighton Buzzard station is served by several local buses. The X2 and X3 bus routes, operated by Arriva Shires & Essex, provide a direct Bus Rapid Transit service to Milton Keynes and Luton via the Luton to Dunstable Busway, with an onward connection to Luton Airport

=== Reinstating the connection to Luton ===
Before its route was lost to other uses, there were proposals to reopen the former line to Dunstable as either a rail link or as a guided busway. Although the Luton to Dunstable Busway (a guided busway) runs over much of the route of the line between the two towns, it does not reach the former Dunstable North station, where Council offices were built in 1989. The track-bed west from Dunstable to Stanbridgeford has been converted to a shared path, the Sewell Greenway. The next two miles west of Stanbridgeford have been used for the Leighton Buzzard Southern Bypass road while sections within Leighton Buzzard have either been built on or are used for walking and cycling.

== Accidents and incidents ==
On 22 March 1931, a passenger train was derailed due to excessive speed through a crossover. Six people were killed.

== Sources ==
- Butt, R. V. J. (October 1995). The Directory of Railway Stations: details every public and private passenger station, halt, platform and stopping place, past and present (1st ed.). Sparkford: Patrick Stephens Ltd. ISBN 978-1-85260-508-7. OCLC 60251199. OL 11956311M.
- Clinker, C.R. (October 1978). Clinker's Register of Closed Passenger Stations and Goods Depots in England, Scotland and Wales 1830–1977. Bristol: Avon-Anglia Publications & Services. ISBN 0-905466-19-5.
- Hall, Stanley (1990). The Railway Detectives. London: Ian Allan. ISBN 0-7110-1929-0.
- Leleux, Robin (1984) [1976]. A Regional History of the Railways of Great Britain: The East Midlands (Volume 9). Newton Abbot, Devon: David St. John Thomas. ISBN 978-0-946537-06-8.
- Oppitz, Leslie (2000). Lost Railways of the Chilterns (Lost Railways Series). Newbury, Berkshire: Countryside Books. ISBN 978-1-85306-643-6.
- Shannon, Paul (1995). British Railways Past and Present: Buckinghamshire, Bedfordshire and West Hertfordshire (No. 24). Wadenhoe, Peterborough: Past & Present Publishing Ltd. ISBN 978-1-85895-073-0.
- Simpson, Bill (1998). The Dunstable Branch. Witney, Oxon: Lamplight Publications. ISBN 978-1-899246-03-8.
- Woodward, Sue; Woodward, Geoff (May 2008). Branch Line to Dunstable from Leighton Buzzard to Hatfield. Midhurst, West Sussex: Middleton Press. ISBN 978-1-906008-27-7.
