= Grove House, Dunstable =

Municipal building in Dunstable, Bedfordshire, England

Grove House
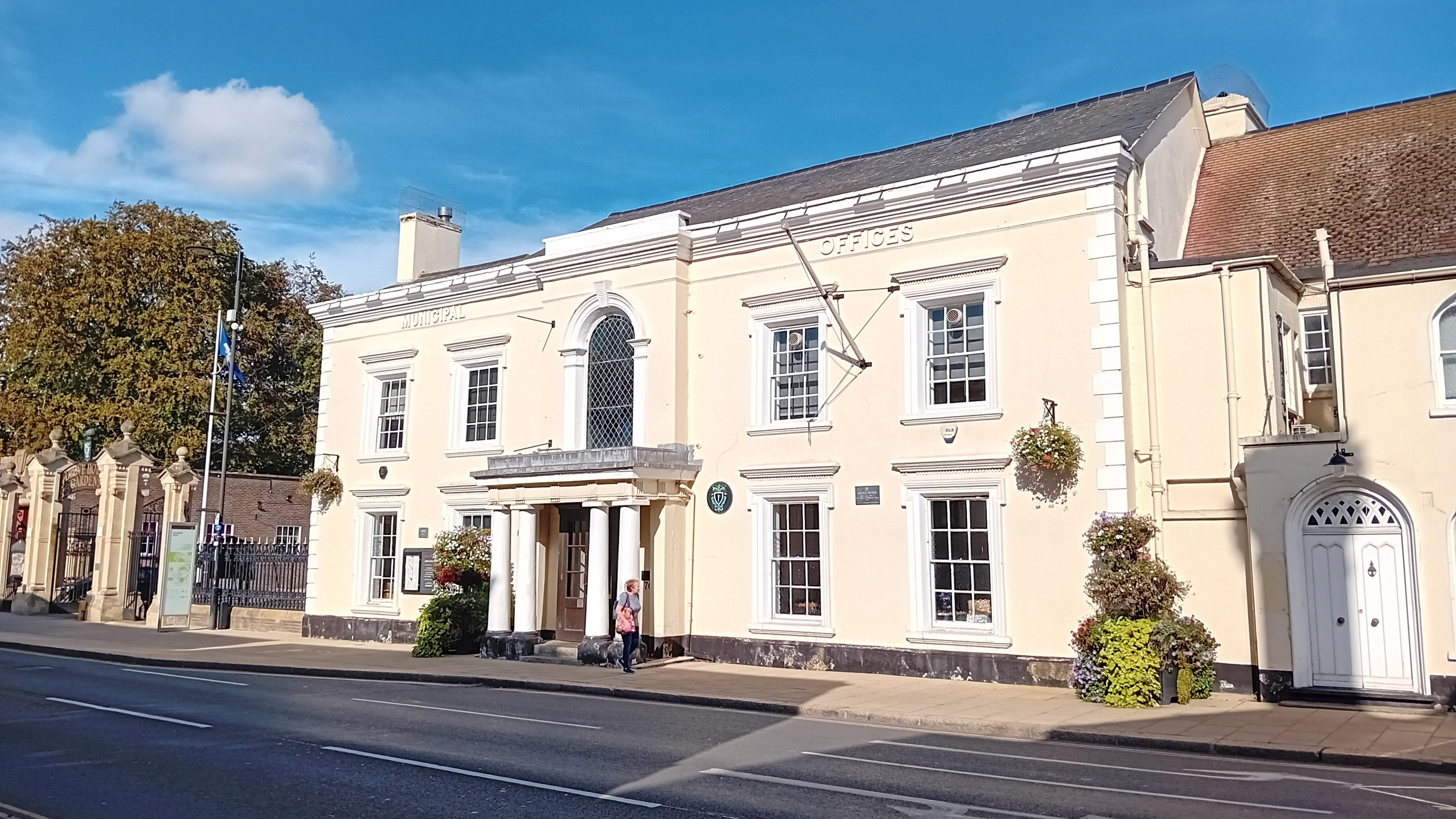
- Grove House

- Shown in Bedfordshire
- 51.8884°N 0.5238°W
- Location: High Street North, Dunstable

History
- Built: 1747

Site notes
- Architectural style: Neoclassical style

Listed Building – Grade II
- Official name: Grove House
- Designated: 25 October 1951
- Reference no.: 1138223

Grove House, also known as Dunstable Municipal Offices, is a municipal building in High Street North, Dunstable, Bedfordshire, England. The building, which forms the offices and meeting place of Dunstable Town Council, is a Grade II listed building.

== History ==
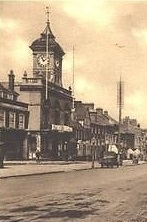
Dunstable Town Hall, demolished in 1966

The building started life as a public house known as the Duke of Bedford's Arms: it was built by a local builder, John Swindall, and was completed in 1747. The house and estate were acquired by a local land-owner, John Miller, and converted into a private residence in the late 18th century. The last horse race at the local racecourse, Dunstable Park, which the formed part of the adjoining estate to the south east, Park Farm, took place in 1854.

The house was remodelled in the neoclassical style with a heavy stucco finish in the late 19th century. The design involved a symmetrical main frontage with five bays facing onto High Street North; the central bay, which slightly projected forward, featured a portico with Doric order columns supporting an entablature with triglyphs on the ground floor and a tall round headed window flanked by pilasters supporting an architrave and a keystone on the first floor. The outer bays were fenestrated by sash windows with architraves and cornices on both floors, while, at roof level there was an entablature, a cornice and a parapet. The house, its estate and Park Farm were all acquired by a local businessman, Arthur Bagshawe, in 1920. Following his death, the house and its enlarged estate were bought by Dunstable Corporation in 1936: the house was converted for use by the corporation as offices and the gardens were opened to the public. (Note: The borough council continued to meet at Dunstable Town Hall and used Grove House as offices for council officers and their departments. A market hall had been commissioned by the lord of the manor, the Duke of Bedford, in 1803, enhanced by a clock tower in 1869, and following a major fire, rebuilt in a similar style as Dunstable Town Hall in 1880. Following completion of the new Queensway Hall, the town hall was demolished in 1966.)

During the Second World War air raid shelters were established in the gardens and, after the war, annual garden fetes were opened by celebrities who included the BBC Radio presenter, Derek McCulloch, in 1951, the novelist, Barbara Cartland, in 1959 and the actor, Sam Kydd, also in 1959.

Following local government re-organisation in 1974, the building was briefly used by South Bedfordshire District Council until it moved to new offices on the site of the former Dunstable North railway station in 1989. The newly formed Dunstable Town Council acquired the building and moved into it at that time. As well as being the offices and meeting place for the town council, it became an approved venue for weddings and civil partnership ceremonies.
