= Hyde, Bedfordshire =

Civil parish in Bedfordshire, England

Coordinates: 51.8455°N 0.3674°W

Hyde
- Location within Bedfordshire
- Population: 411
- OS grid reference: TL125175
- Unitary authority: Central Bedfordshire
- Ceremonial county: Bedfordshire
- Region: East
- Country: England
- Sovereign state: United Kingdom
- Post town: LUTON
- Postcode district: LU1, LU2
- Dialling code: 01582
- Police: Bedfordshire
- Fire: Bedfordshire
- Ambulance: East of England
- UK Parliament: Luton South

Hyde (also known as The Hyde) is a civil parish in the county of Bedfordshire. It lies just south-east of Luton.

Most of the land to the west of the River Lea is occupied by the Luton Hoo estate, which includes West Hyde. To the east of the river, the parish contains the ruins of Someries Castle and the hamlets of Chiltern Green, East Hyde and New Mill End.

Hyde was served by two railway stations, Luton Hoo and Chiltern Green, but these have since closed.
