= Linslade Tunnel =

Railway tunnel in England

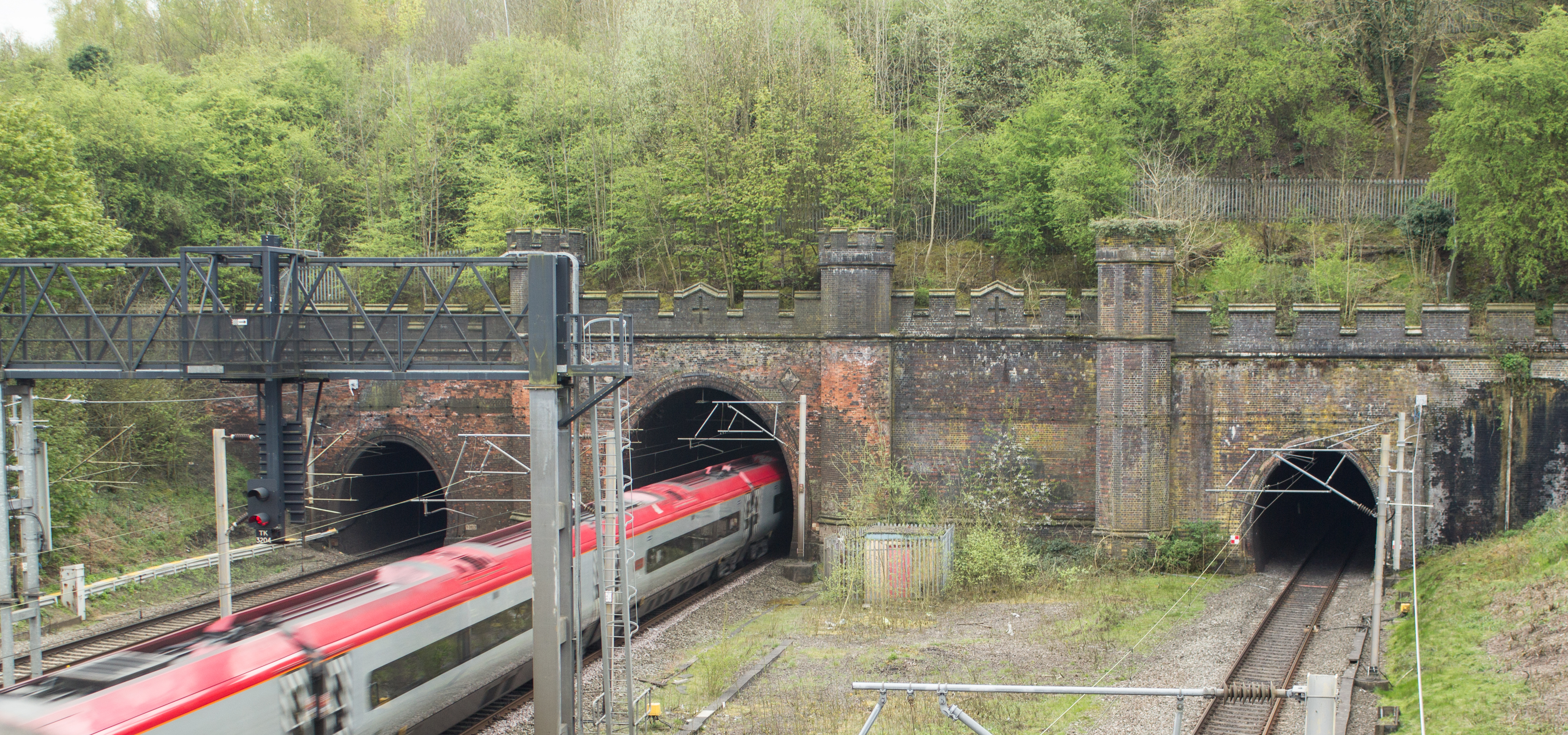
- North portals of Linslade tunnels with a Virgin Trains West Coast Pendolino heading south towards London Euston
- Interactive map of Linslade Tunnel

Overview
- Line: West Coast Main Line
- Location: Bedfordshire
- Coordinates: 51.9254°N 0.6765°W

Operation
- Work began: 1833
- Opened: 1837
- Rebuilt: 1857 and 1876
- Owner: Network Rail

Linslade Tunnel is a railway tunnel in Bedfordshire, England (in an area that was historically in Buckinghamshire), on the West Coast Main Line about 0.54 miles (0.9 km) north of Leighton Buzzard railway station and built under Linslade Woods. Consisting of three individual bores, the tunnel is the only one on the London and Birmingham Railway to have been built on a bend. This was necessitated by the refusal of local landowners to allow the railway to pass closer to Leighton Buzzard, where the river has created a gap in the Bedfordshire Greensand Ridge.

The first bore was constructed during the 1830s, the engineering of which having been performed by the pioneering railway builder George Stephenson. The only of the three bores to accommodate double track, it was first opened to traffic during 1837.

During 1857, the eastern bore was added to serve the goods line from Bletchley to Primrose Hill and support a rebuild of Leighton Buzzard station incorporating a dedicated platform for the Dunstable branch line. Elsewhere on the line, goods trains shared the "up" track through twin-track tunnels. In 1876 a second freight line was added with twin-track tunnels except at Linslade, where a second single-track tunnel was added to the west of the original twin-track tunnel. A new pair of passenger lines was added at the west of Leighton Buzzard station and the tracks through the twin-track tunnel were reallocated so that the passenger lines were served by the western single bore and the western track in the twin-track tunnel. This resulted in the unusual arrangement that, through the tunnel, trains "drive on the right".

During the 1960s, Linslade Tunnel was outfitted with overhead electrification as part of a wider scheme to introduce electric traction on the West Coast Main Line. In the 1970s, the tunnel portals on either side of the tunnel were recognised as Grade II listed buildings due to their connection to early railway engineering history. During the 2010s, remedial engineering works were performed in the tunnel.

== Design ==
The London and Birmingham Railway was opened in 1837. Robert Stephenson, the railway's chief engineer, was determined to keep the gradients on the route to a maximum of 1:330 which required significant engineering works. From the end of Tring Cutting to just south Leighton Buzzard railway station, the railway is carried on a series of embankments, after which it enters another deep cutting before reaching a small patch of sandstone high ground under Linslade Woods. A generation earlier, the Grand Junction Canal had followed the western edge of the floodplain of the River Ouzel, taking two fairly tight bends as a result. Once Stephenson was forced away from the town by local landowners, he was obliged to tunnel through the ridge to maintain his desired gradient and radius of curvature.

The tunnel consists of three bores; the central bore was the first to be constructed and opened with the line in 1837. The contract for its construction was issued around 1834, one of the first contracts on the route. The central bore is 272 yards (249 metres) long and was built wide enough to carry two tracks. It has a depth of roughly 55 yards (50 m), its excavation involved the removal of 20,433 cubic yards (15,600 m^{3}) of spoil. The tunnel was built on a slight curve. Around the time of its opening it was described as relatively spacious.

The tunnel portals at the northern end are heavily decorated. Above and around the openings is a red-brick retaining wall, except for the westernmost (the last one to be built) which is in blue brick. Above these is a blue-brick crennelated (castellated) parapet and a series of turrets flank the mouths of the portals. This use of blue brick suggests that the castellation was renewed when the westernmost tunnel was bored. The south portals are less elaborate but still decorated. They have significant batter (a sloping wall), rusticated voussoirs at the mouths and a rolled cornice above.

== History ==
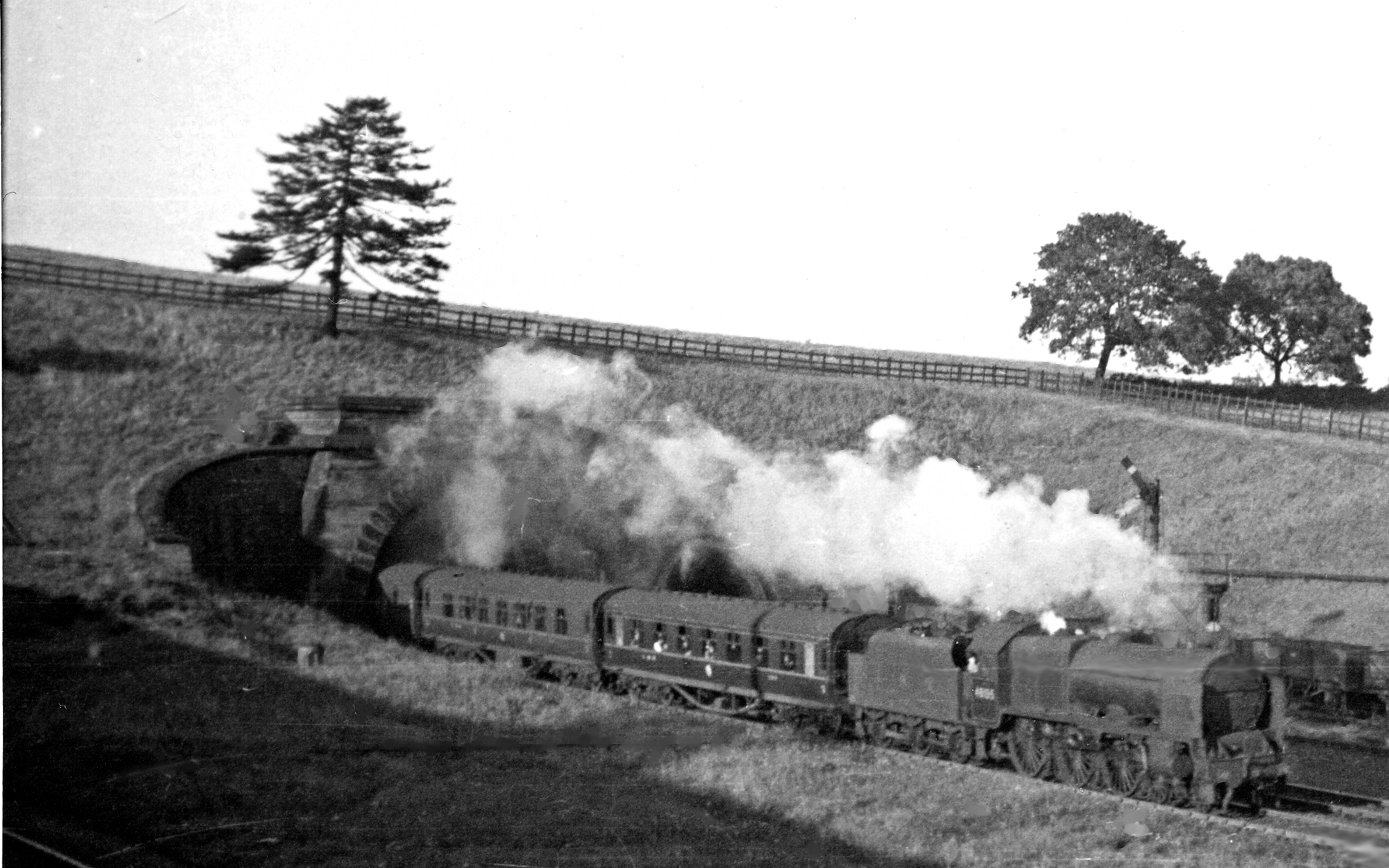
A steam-hauled express emerging from Linslade Tunnel's southern portal, October 1948

During the 1960s, Linslade Tunnel, along with the majority of the West Coast Main Line, had overhead electrification apparatus installed, which facilitated the line's transition to electric traction.

On 9 December 1982, during the British Rail era, there was a fatal incident at Linslade Tunnel: a load which had been loosened by hump shunting at Toton Sidings had fallen from one train and was struck by the next train passing through the tunnel, causing its derailment. The train hit a pier of the road bridge 100m to the north, killing its driver.

During the late 2010s, deteriorated parts of the brickwork within Linslade Tunnel were repaired. In early 2020, there were more engineering works in the tunnel, largely focused on a comprehensive track renewal, to improve service reliability.

Both portals are Grade II listed buildings. The north portal is cited as an "interesting example of early railway architecture". The south portal, although less intricate, is included for completeness.

== See also ==
- List of tunnels in the United Kingdom
