= Chiltern Green railway station =

Disused railway station in England

Coordinates: 51°51′0.9″N 0°22′10″W

Chiltern Green
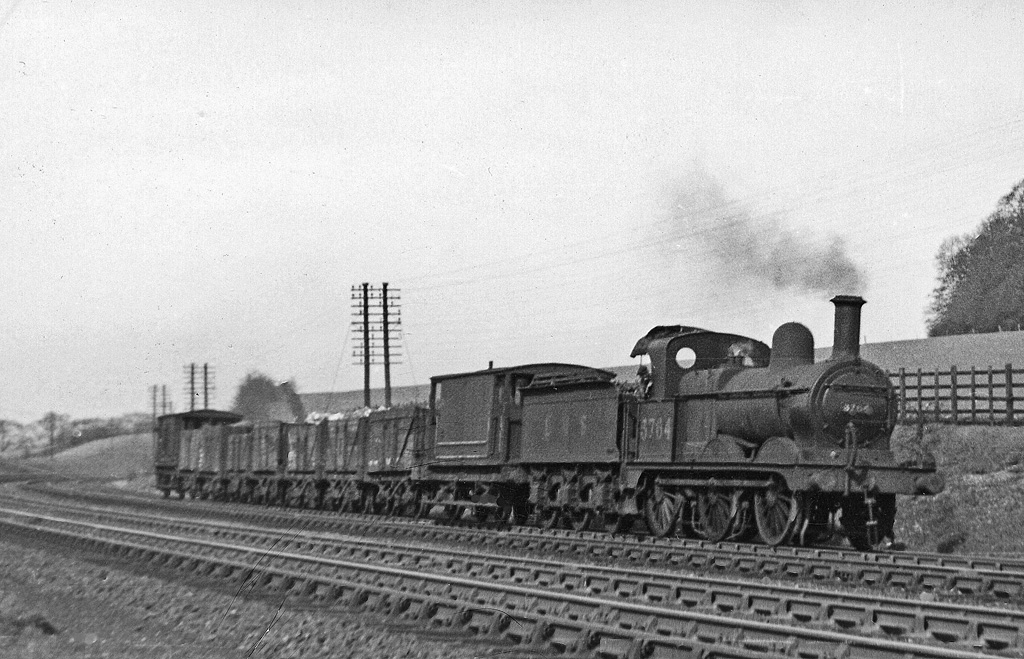
- A local goods train near Chiltern Green in 1950

General information
- Location: New Mill End, District of Central Bedfordshire; England
- Platforms: 2

Other information
- Status: Disused

History
- Pre-grouping: Midland Railway

Key dates
- 13 July 1868: Opened as Chiltern Green
- 1 December 1891: Renamed Chiltern Green for Luton Hoo
- 7 April 1952: Closed
Location

Chiltern Green railway station was built by the Midland Railway in 1868 on its extension to St. Pancras.

The station was located in New Mill End but took its name from the small hamlet of Chiltern Green about a mile away. Adjacent to it was the GNR station of Luton Hoo also located in New Mill End. The small hamlet of New Mill End is unique in having two railway stations (Chiltern Green and Luton Hoo) neither of which, after 1 December 1891, were named after the village they served. The two lines ran side by side at this point: the Midland into Luton Midland Road and the GNR from Hatfield into Luton Bute Street.

The station closed in 1952 due to competition from Luton Hoo station, only 600 yards (500 m) away. Ironically, the branch line between Welwyn Garden City and Leighton Buzzard, which Luton Hoo was on, closed in 1965, meaning that New Mill End was no longer served by a local railway station.

The station buildings survive to this day as a private home. The platform on the station building side partly survives but is overgrown and difficult to see when passing in a train. The other platform was removed when the line was electrified.

== Stationmasters ==
- W. Barker 1870 - 1873
- F. Christian 1873 - 1875
- G. Evans 1875 - 1881
- W.H. Higginson 1881 - 1888
- R. Cotterill 1888 - 1890
- David Gilliver 1890 - 1893
- George William Bland 1893 - 1922
- F.J. Aldridge 1922 -
- F. Butler until 1933 (also station master at Luton, afterwards station master at Walsall)
- A.J. Hawkrigg until 1937 (afterwards station master at Doe Hill)

Preceding station	Historical railways	Following station
Luton; Line and station open	Midland Railway; Midland Main Line	Harpenden; Line and station open
