= South Bedfordshire District Council elections =

Local government elections in Bedfordshire, England

South Bedfordshire was a non-metropolitan district in Bedfordshire, England. It was abolished on 1 April 2009 and replaced by Central Bedfordshire.

== Political control ==
The first election to the council was held in 1973, initially operating as a shadow authority alongside the outgoing authorities before coming into its powers on 1 April 1974. Political control of the council from 1974 until its abolition in 2009 was as follows:

Party in control	Years
No overall control	1974–1976
Conservative	1976–1995
No overall control	1995–2002
Conservative	2002–2009

=== Leadership ===
The last leader of the council was Norman Costin, a Conservative.

Councillor	Party	From	To
Norman Costin	Conservative		31 Mar 2009

== Council elections ==
- 1973 South Bedfordshire District Council election
- 1976 South Bedfordshire District Council election (New ward boundaries)
- 1979 South Bedfordshire District Council election
- 1980 South Bedfordshire District Council election
- 1982 South Bedfordshire District Council election
- 1983 South Bedfordshire District Council election
- 1984 South Bedfordshire District Council election
- 1986 South Bedfordshire District Council election (District boundary changes took place but the number of seats remained the same)
- 1987 South Bedfordshire District Council election
- 1988 South Bedfordshire District Council election
- 1990 South Bedfordshire District Council election
- 1991 South Bedfordshire District Council election (District boundary changes took place but the number of seats remained the same)
- 1992 South Bedfordshire District Council election
- 1994 South Bedfordshire District Council election
- 1995 South Bedfordshire District Council election
- 1996 South Bedfordshire District Council election
- 1998 South Bedfordshire District Council election
- 1999 South Bedfordshire District Council election
- 2000 South Bedfordshire District Council election
- 2002 South Bedfordshire District Council election (New ward boundaries)
- 2003 South Bedfordshire District Council election
- 2004 South Bedfordshire District Council election
- 2006 South Bedfordshire District Council election
- 2007 South Bedfordshire District Council election

== Result maps ==
2002 results map

2003 results map

2004 results map

2006 results map

2007 results map

== By-election results ==
=== 2004-2006 ===
Chiltern By-Election 5 May 2005
Party	Candidate	Votes	%	±%
Conservative		1,443	61.0	−5.9
Liberal Democrats		923	39.0	+22.2
Majority		520	22.0	
Turnout		2,366		
Conservative hold		Swing		
