= East Hyde =

Village in Bedfordshire, England

Coordinates: 51.84309°N 0.36427°W

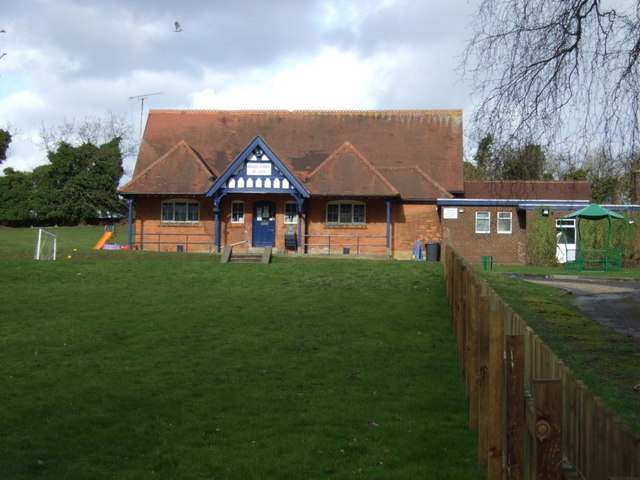

- Location within Bedfordshire
- OS grid reference: TL127173
- Civil parish: Hyde
- Unitary authority: Central Bedfordshire
- Ceremonial county: Bedfordshire
- Region: East
- Country: England
- Sovereign state: United Kingdom
- Post town: LUTON
- Postcode district: LU2
- Dialling code: 01582
- Police: Bedfordshire
- Fire: Bedfordshire
- Ambulance: East of England
- UK Parliament: Luton South

East Hyde is a village in the civil parish of Hyde, in the Central Bedfordshire district, in the ceremonial county of Bedfordshire, England.

East Hyde lies on the border with Hertfordshire.
