= South Bedfordshire =

Former local government district in England

Coordinates: 51°55′N 0°42′W

- Former district
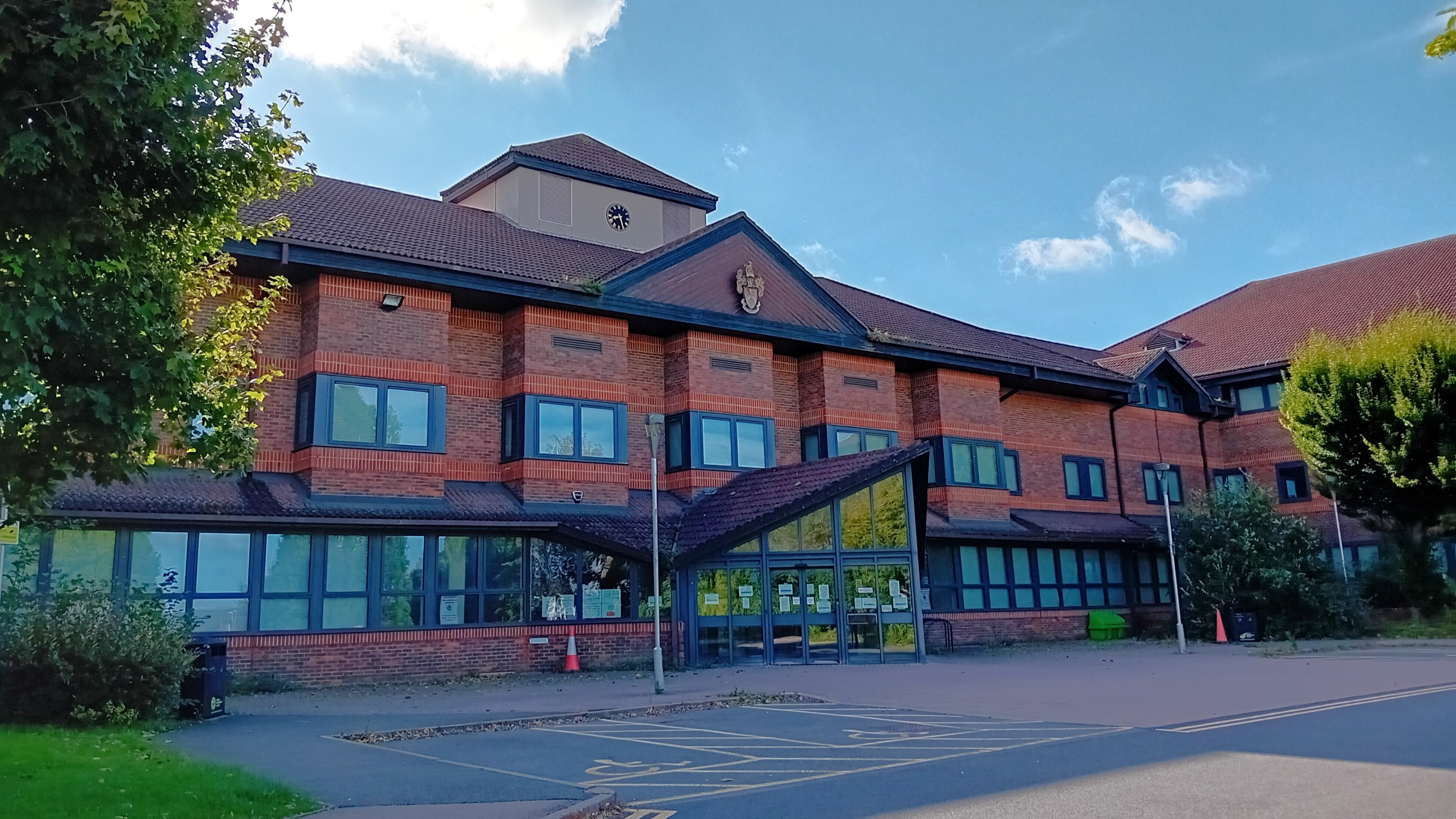
- District Council Offices, High Street North, Dunstable

- Shown within Bedfordshire
- Area
  - 1974: 124,423 acres (503.52 km^{2})
- Population
  - 1973: 94,750
  - 1992: 110,110
  - 2007: 118,200
- History
  - Origin: Municipal Borough of Dunstable; Leighton-Linslade Urban District; Luton Rural District
  - Created: 1 April 1974
  - Abolished: 31 March 2009
  - Succeeded by: Central Bedfordshire
- ONS code: 09UE
- Government: South Bedfordshire District Council
  - HQ: Dunstable
  - Motto: By Truth and Diligence

- Subdivisions
  - Type: Civil parishes

South Bedfordshire was a local government district in Bedfordshire, in the East of England, from 1974 to 2009. Its main towns were Dunstable, Houghton Regis and Leighton Buzzard.

== Creation ==
The district was formed on 1 April 1974 as part of a general reorganisation of local authorities in England and Wales carried out under the Local Government Act 1972. South Bedfordshire was formed by the amalgamation of three former districts which were all abolished at the same time:

- Dunstable Municipal Borough;
- Leighton-Linslade Urban District; and
- Luton Rural District.

== Premises ==
The council initially used the former Dunstable Borough Council offices at Grove House in Dunstable as its headquarters, but also continued to use the former Leighton-Linslade offices at the White House in Leighton Buzzard and the former Luton Rural District Council offices on Sundon Road in Houghton Regis. A new headquarters for the council was built in 1989 on the site of the former Dunstable North railway station, called the District Council Offices. Following the council's abolition in 2009 the building was used as a secondary office by Central Bedfordshire Council, being renamed as Watling House.

== Civil parishes ==
The district comprised the following civil parishes:

- Barton-le-Clay
- Caddington
- Chalton
- Dunstable (Town)
- Eaton Bray
- Heath and Reach
- Houghton Regis (Town)
- Hockliffe
- Hyde
- Leighton-Linslade (Town)
- Kensworth
- Slip End
- Stanbridge
- Streatley
- Studham
- Sundon
- Toddington
- Totternhoe
- Whipsnade

== Elections and political control ==
The first election to South Bedfordshire District Council took place on 7 June 1973, with the 45 councillors elected forming a shadow authority until 1 April 1974. Following ward boundary changes, the number of councillors was increased to 53, with an election of the whole council held in 1976. The council resolved to hold elections by thirds thereafter. Councillors had a four-year term of office, and one third of the council was elected in three years out of four. Elections to Bedfordshire County Council took place in years that there were none to the district council. In 2002 the wards were again redrawn, and the size of the council was reduced to 50 members. An election of the whole council was held on the new boundaries. The electoral cycle continued by thirds in later years. The elections due to take place in May 2008 were cancelled, with councillors staying in office until the abolition of the council in 2009.

The first council elected was under no overall control, with the Conservative Party having the largest number of councillors. The party dominated the council for most of its existence, gaining a majority in 1976 which they held until 1995. In 1996 they were supplanted by the Labour Party as the largest grouping on the council, in a year that saw a strong vote against the unpopular Conservative government of John Major. In 1999 the Liberal Democrats briefly became the largest group on the council, which remained under no overall control. The Conservatives staged a recovery in 2000, taking 10 seats from Labour and the Liberal Democrats, and again gaining a plurality of councillors. They subsequently regained their majority, which they held until the council's abolition.

Year	Conservative	Labour	Liberal/ Liberal Democrat	Independent	Other	Control
1973	17	13	8	7	0	No overall control
1976 †	40	5	6	2	0	Conservative gain from no overall control
1978	37	9	5	2	0	Conservative hold
1979	37	9	6	1	0	Conservative hold
1980	35	11	7	0	0	Conservative hold
1982	34	11	6	2	0	Conservative hold
1983	38	10	4	1	0	Conservative hold
1984	41	9	1	2	0	Conservative hold
1986	37	10	5	1	0	Conservative hold
1987	39	8	4	2	0	Conservative hold
1988	39	8	4	2	0	Conservative hold
1990	37	9	5	2	0	Conservative hold
1991	34	11	6	2	0	Conservative hold
1992	37	9	6	0	1 vacancy	Conservative hold
1994	35	9	7	2	0	Conservative hold
1995	24	15	11	2	Ratepayers 1	Conservative loss to no overall control
1996	15	24	11	3	0	No overall control
1998	13	21	13	3	0	No overall control
1999	16	15	19	3	0	No overall control
2000	26	7	17	3	0	No overall control
2002 †	28	7	15	0	0	Conservative hold
2003	31	6	13	0	0	Conservative hold
2004	34	4	12	0	0	Conservative hold
2006	35	4	11	0	0	Conservative hold
2007	34	4	11	1	0	Conservative hold

† New ward boundaries

== Coat of arms ==
On 27 November 1976 South Bedfordshire District Council was granted armorial bearings by the College of Arms. The arms combined elements from the devices of the three merged councils, and were blazoned as follows:

Or a pile gules over all a single-arched bridge throughout argent masoned sable the keystone charged with an ear of wheat between on the pile three sickles proper all within a bordure engrailed sable; and for a Crest on a wreath of the colours out of a mural crown argent masoned sable in front of a demi-Bull three cog-wheels in fesse Or; and for a Badge or Device: Upon a roundel embattled gules irradiated with rays of the sun a demi-bull rampant couped Or.

The gold and red colouring was derived from the arms of the Bedfordshire County Council. The triangular "pile" and black engrailed border around the shield came from the device of Dunstable Borough Council, itself based on the arms of Dunstable Priory. The bridge across the centre of the shield was from the arms of Leighton Linslade UDC, and the sickles from those of Luton RDC. The crest above the shield was a gold bull, one of the supporters of the county council arms. The motto of Leighton-Linslade, "By Truth and Dilgence" was adopted.

== Abolition ==
In 2006 the Department for Communities and Local Government considered reorganising Bedfordshire's administrative structure as part of the 2009 structural changes to local government in England. On 6 March 2008 it was announced that South Bedfordshire would merge with Mid Bedfordshire to form a new unitary authority called Central Bedfordshire. The new council was formed on 1 April 2009.
