= Sewell Cutting =

Nature reserve in Bedfordshire, England

Coordinates: 51.8942°N 0.5474°W

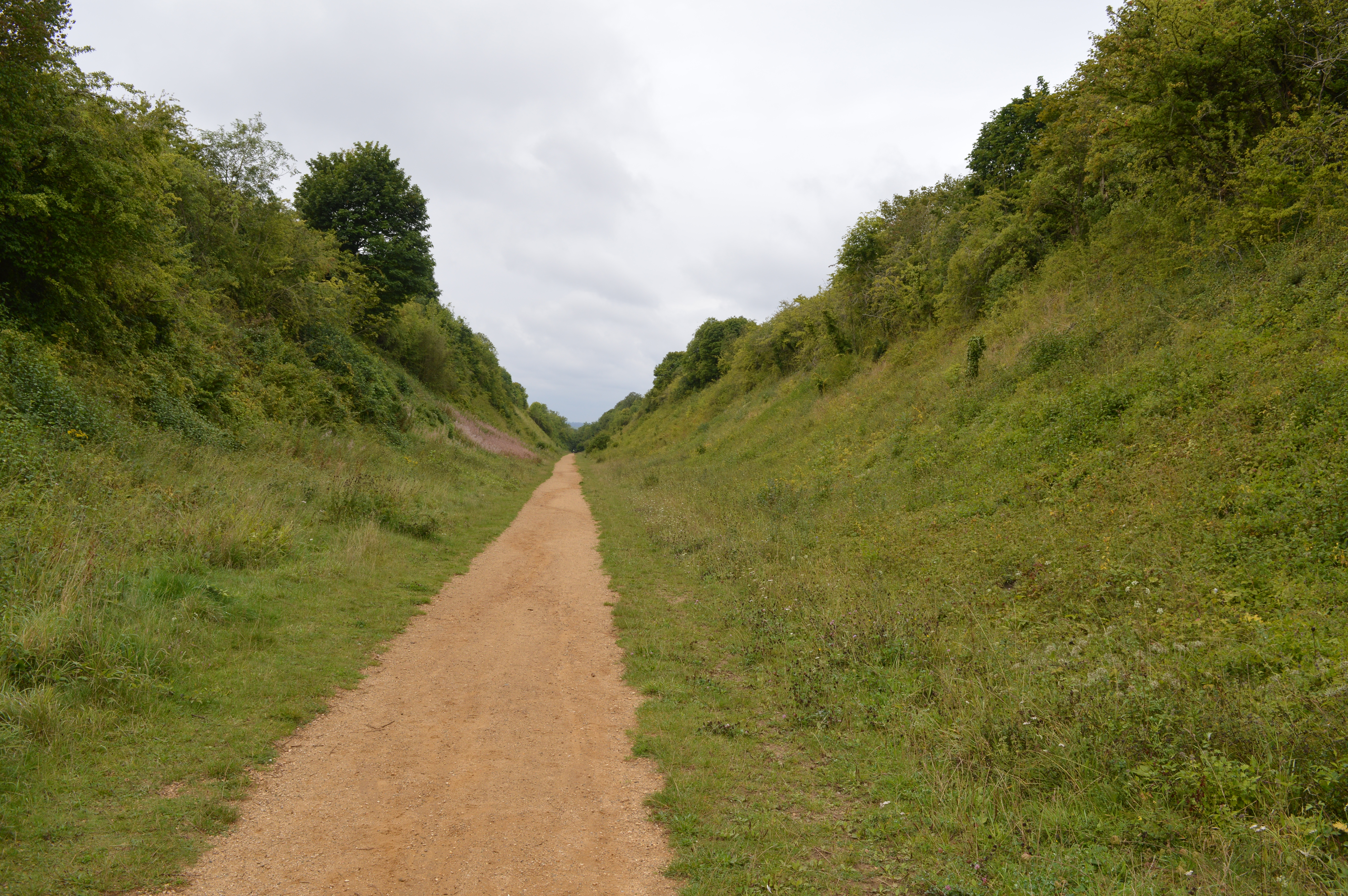

Sewell Cutting is a 3.6-hectare (8.9-acre) nature reserve at Sewell in Houghton Regis in Bedfordshire. It is owned by Central Bedfordshire Council and managed by the Wildlife Trust for Bedfordshire, Cambridgeshire and Northamptonshire.

The site was formerly part of the London North West Railway line, which closed in 1962. The banks provide a rich habitat for chalk grassland flowers, such as common spotted orchids and cowslips. The south-facing slope has deep rooted plants such as hawkweed and scabious, while the sheltered north-facing slope has lush grasses. There are many species of butterflies.

There is access from French's Avenue, and a footpath from the Cutting leads to Totternhoe Chalk Quarry Site of Special Scientific Interest.
