= Luton Hoo railway station =

Former railway station in England

Coordinates: 51°50′57″N 0°22′33″W

Luton Hoo
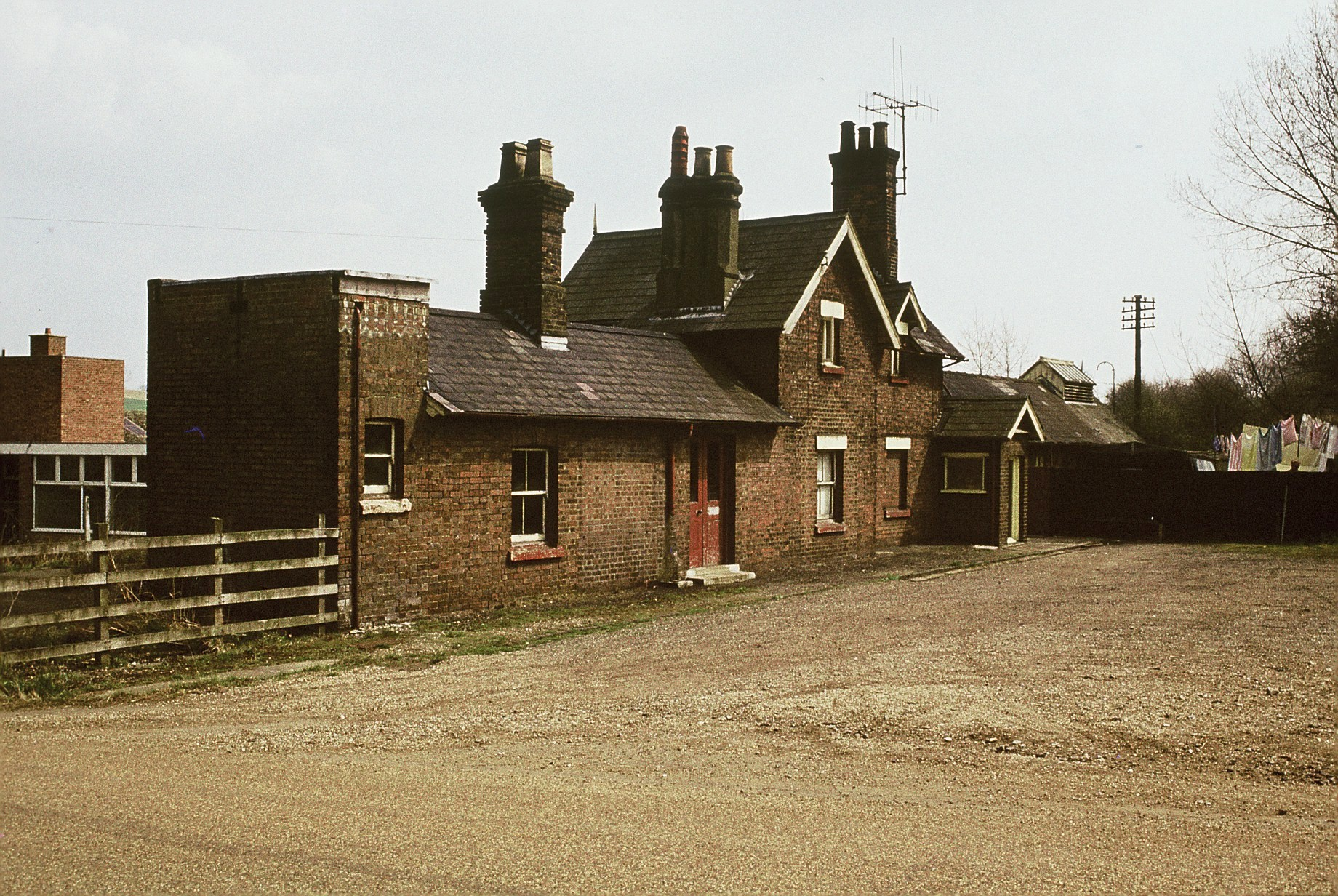
- The station in the 1980s

General information
- Location: Luton Hoo; England
- Platforms: 1

Other information
- Status: Disused

History
- Original company: Hertford, Luton & Dunstable Railway
- Pre-grouping: Great Northern Railway
- Post-grouping: London and North Eastern Railway

Key dates
- 1 September 1860: Opened as New Mill End
- 1 December 1891: Renamed Luton Hoo
- 26 April 1965: Station closed
Location

Luton Hoo railway station was built by the Hertford, Luton and Dunstable Railway on the branch line between Hatfield and Dunstable. It opened in 1860 and was originally called New Mill End. In 1861 the station and line was taken over by the Great Northern Railway. The Prince of Wales, the future George V, who had travelled by special train from King's Cross alighted at the station on 5 December 1878 on a visit to Luton Hoo. A crowd cheered the Prince on his arrival. A carpet was laid along the station platform over which a wooden roof decorated with evergreens and scarlet cloth was erected. The station's name was changed to Luton Hoo in 1891. It was closed in 1965. The last passenger train, packed with enthusiasts, was hauled by Brush Type 2 (later Class 31) D5589 on 24 April 1965.

It served Luton Hoo house and the village of New Mill End. It was close to the Midland Railway station of Chiltern Green and the GNR line took a parallel course to the Midland north to Luton Bute Street.

The station building and platform still exist, sited next to a sewage works.

== Routes ==
Preceding station	Disused railways	Following station
Luton Bute Street; Line and station closed	Great Northern Railway; Dunstable Branch	Harpenden East; Line and station closed

== See also ==
- List of closed railway stations in Britain
