= Luton Bute Street railway station =

Disused railway station in England

Coordinates: 51.8817°N 0.4139°W

Luton Bute Street
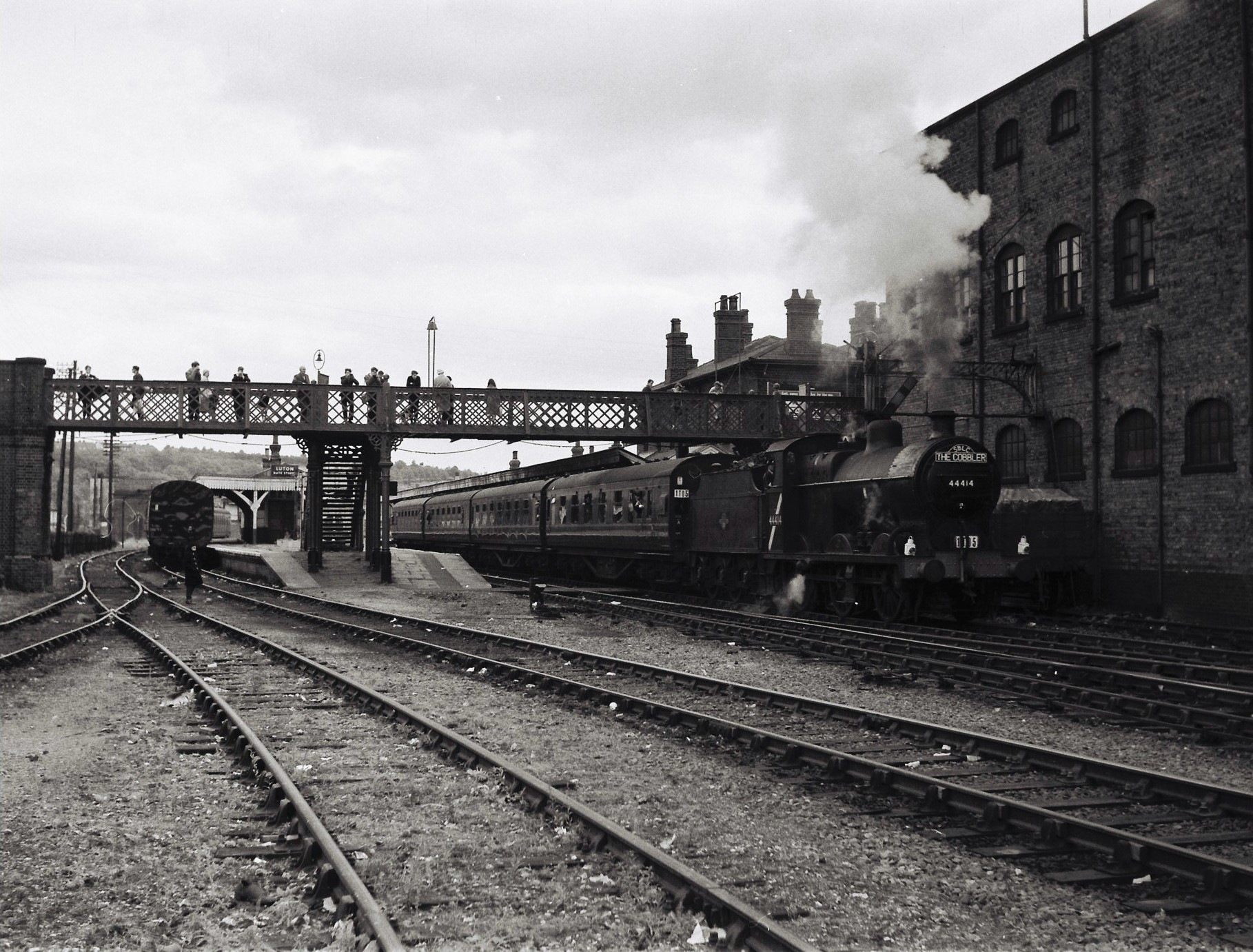
- 4F 0-6-0 44414 heads The Cobbler special out of Luton Bute Street railway station to Dunstable, Leighton Buzzard and Northampton. 19 September 1964

General information
- Location: Luton; England
- Platforms: 3

Other information
- Status: Disused

History
- Original company: Hertford, Luton & Dunstable Railway
- Pre-grouping: Great Northern Railway
- Post-grouping: London and North Eastern Railway

Key dates
- 3 May 1858: Opened as Luton
- 25 September 1950: Name changed to Luton Bute Street
- 26 April 1965: Closed
Location

Luton Bute Street railway station was the first to be built in Luton, England. It was opened by the Luton, Dunstable and Welwyn Junction Railway Company in 1858, which was an extension of the Welwyn and Hertford Railway. The track to Welwyn was completed in 1860 and taken over by the Great Northern the following year.

== History ==
The station was valuable to Luton people not only for passengers but also for facilitating the London market for the town's trade in plaited straw goods. The station, and the line to Welwyn, closed in 1965.

Following closure to passengers in 1965, the station buildings were quickly demolished despite the line remaining open for freight until 1989–1990. The site of the station was used later as a car park for Luton railway station. Throughout the years, various local pressure groups have been supportive of reopening the station as part of a viable branch line between Dunstable and Luton. In the mid-1990s, there was a debate about reopening it, either with the operation of diesel Class 158s or electric Class 319s.

The site has since been redeveloped, as the new Luton Gateway transport interchange on the Luton to Dunstable Busway guided busway system.

== Routes ==
Preceding station	Disused railways	Following station
Chaul End; Line and station closed	Great Northern Railway; Dunstable Branch Line	Luton Hoo; Line and station closed

== See also ==
- List of closed railway stations in Britain
