= Stanbridge, Bedfordshire =

Village in Bedfordshire, England

Coordinates: 51.9076°N 0.5992°W

Stanbridge
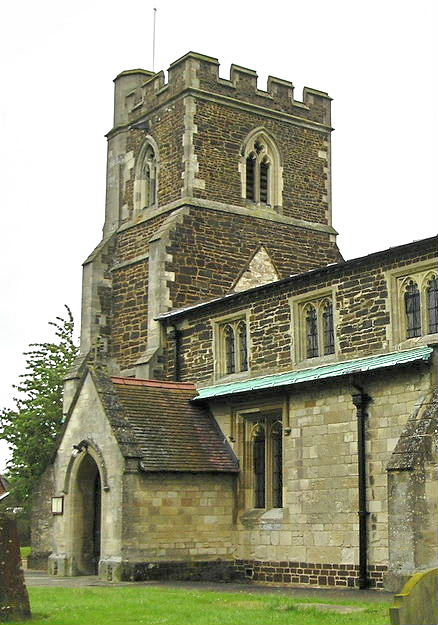
- Parish church of St John the Baptist

- Location within Bedfordshire
- Population: 752
- OS grid reference: SP964241
- Civil parish: Stanbridge
- Unitary authority: Central Bedfordshire
- Ceremonial county: Bedfordshire
- Region: East
- Country: England
- Sovereign state: United Kingdom
- Post town: LEIGHTON BUZZARD
- Postcode district: LU7
- Dialling code: 01525
- Police: Bedfordshire
- Fire: Bedfordshire
- Ambulance: East of England
- UK Parliament: South West Bedfordshire

Stanbridge is a village and civil parish in Bedfordshire which lies 3 miles (5 km) east of Leighton Buzzard. It also borders the Bedfordshire villages of Hockliffe, Eggington, Tilsworth, Totternhoe and Billington.

There was a windmill to the east of Mill Road, in the north of the village, that is marked on early Ordnance Survey maps. To the west of Mill Road, still standing, is a later windmill that has been converted to a three-story house. This has recently had a new dome fitted to its roof. St John the Baptist Parish Church is also located in the village.

Stanbridge had its own railway station, until it was closed in the 1960s by Lord Beeching. This was to the south of the village, at Stanbridgeford on the Leighton Buzzard to Dunstable LNWR line. The eastern part of the old line has been utilised as a footpath to Sewell and Dunstable; the western part is now part of the Leighton Buzzard Southern Bypass.

RAF Stanbridge was built on land that was in the neighbouring parish of Billington, but the town of Leighton Buzzard has now expanded over much of the base.

The village has a traditional English country public house called The Five Bells.

Stanbridge is part of the political ward of 'Heath and Reach' which sends a Councillor to Central Bedfordshire Council. The ward includes the villages of Heath and Reach, Hockliffe, Eggington, Stanbridge, Tilsworth, Tebworth, and Wingrave. The ward was created in 2011 and has since been represented by Councillor Mark Versallion.

== Education ==
The education authority, for the Leighton Buzzard area, since September 2019, calculates distances from each residence to the nearest lower school (in most circumstances) and uses that to determine priority admissions; the education authority uses computer systems to do this. Designated catchment zones are, as of 2024, no longer used for lower schools in the Leighton Buzzard area. Stanbridge is among the areas under this admissions regime.
