= Sewell, Bedfordshire =

Hamlet in Bedfordshire, England

Coordinates: 51.89503°N 0.55601°W

Sewell
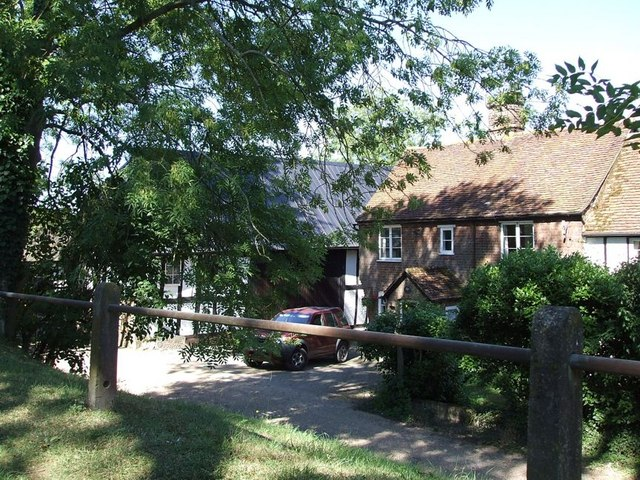
- Sewell

- Location within Bedfordshire
- OS grid reference: SP993261
- Civil parish: Houghton Regis
- Unitary authority: Central Bedfordshire
- Ceremonial county: Bedfordshire
- Region: East
- Country: England
- Sovereign state: United Kingdom
- Post town: DUNSTABLE
- Postcode district: LU5
- Dialling code: 01582
- Police: Bedfordshire
- Fire: Bedfordshire
- Ambulance: East of England
- UK Parliament: South West Bedfordshire

Sewell is a hamlet located in the Central Bedfordshire district of Bedfordshire, England.

Sewell is a small rural settlement, though it is located near to the town of Dunstable (and therefore the wider Luton/Dunstable/Houghton Regis Urban Area). The settlement forms part of the Houghton Regis civil parish. It is north of Dunstable Downs at the northern edge of the Chiltern Hills.

The hamlet is beside London and North Western Railway's disused branch line that linked Dunstable with the main line at Leighton Buzzard. This is now a cycle route and consists of Sewell Cutting which heads towards Dunstable and a long embankment in the direction of Stanbridge. One hundred and fifty metres south of the former railway track are Maiden Bower, an Iron Age hill fort and Totternhoe Chalk Quarry.

Sewell hosts a collection of listed homes and barns but one of the most prominent properties in the hamlet is Sewell Manor. This grade II list manor house dates back to around the 13th century and is full of character and history. It was purchased by Henry Brandreth 1652 from the Civil War Sequestrators. In recent years it has fallen into disrepair but has now recently been purchased by the Roche family to become their main residence and restoration work has begun to restore this manor back to former glory.

Maiden Bower used to consist of a roughly circular bank topped with wooden posts. It had a diameter averaging around 225 metres. It now has a 3 metre high hedged bank, 100 metres of which has been undermined by the cliffs of the adjacent quarry. The enclosure contains the buried remains of a small Roman building. Previous excavation of the ditches has discovered ancient human remains.

An early Bronze Age hoard was found in Sewell in 1968 and consists of a beaker, wrist-guard, toggle and pin, all now in the British Museum's collection.
