= New Mill End =

Hamlet in Bedfordshire, England

Coordinates: 51.850°N 0.374°W

- Location within Bedfordshire
- OS grid reference: TL127173
- Civil parish: Hyde
- Unitary authority: Central Bedfordshire
- Ceremonial county: Bedfordshire
- Region: East
- Country: England
- Sovereign state: United Kingdom
- Post town: LUTON
- Postcode district: LU2
- Dialling code: 01582
- Police: Bedfordshire
- Fire: Bedfordshire
- Ambulance: East of England
- UK Parliament: Luton South

New Mill End is a hamlet in Central Bedfordshire, England, close to the Bedfordshire county border with Hertfordshire. It is in the civil parish of Hyde, 3 miles (4.8 km) south east of Luton on the B653 road to Wheathampstead.

New Mill End Farmhouse is 19th century and Grade II listed by Historic England. Thames Water's East Hyde sewage treatment works is situated in New Mill End.

New Mill End was the location of two railway stations. Chiltern Green railway station on the Midland Railway opened in 1868 and closed in 1952; the station buildings survive as a private home and the line remains open. New Mill End station on the Hertford, Luton and Dunstable Railway opened in 1860 but was renamed Luton Hoo Station in 1891; it closed in 1965. The track has been dismantled and the route is now part of the Upper Lea Valley Way, a section of the Lea Valley Walk, and National Cycle Route 6.
