= Dunstable Branch Lines =

Railway lines in Hertfordshire, England

Dunstable and London and Birmingham Railway Act 1845
- Act of Parliament
- Parliament of the United Kingdom
- Long title: An Act for making a Railway from the Town of Dunstable to join the London and Birmingham Railway near Leighton Buzzard in the County of Bedford.
- Citation: 8 & 9 Vict. c. xxxvii

Dates
- Royal assent: 30 June 1845

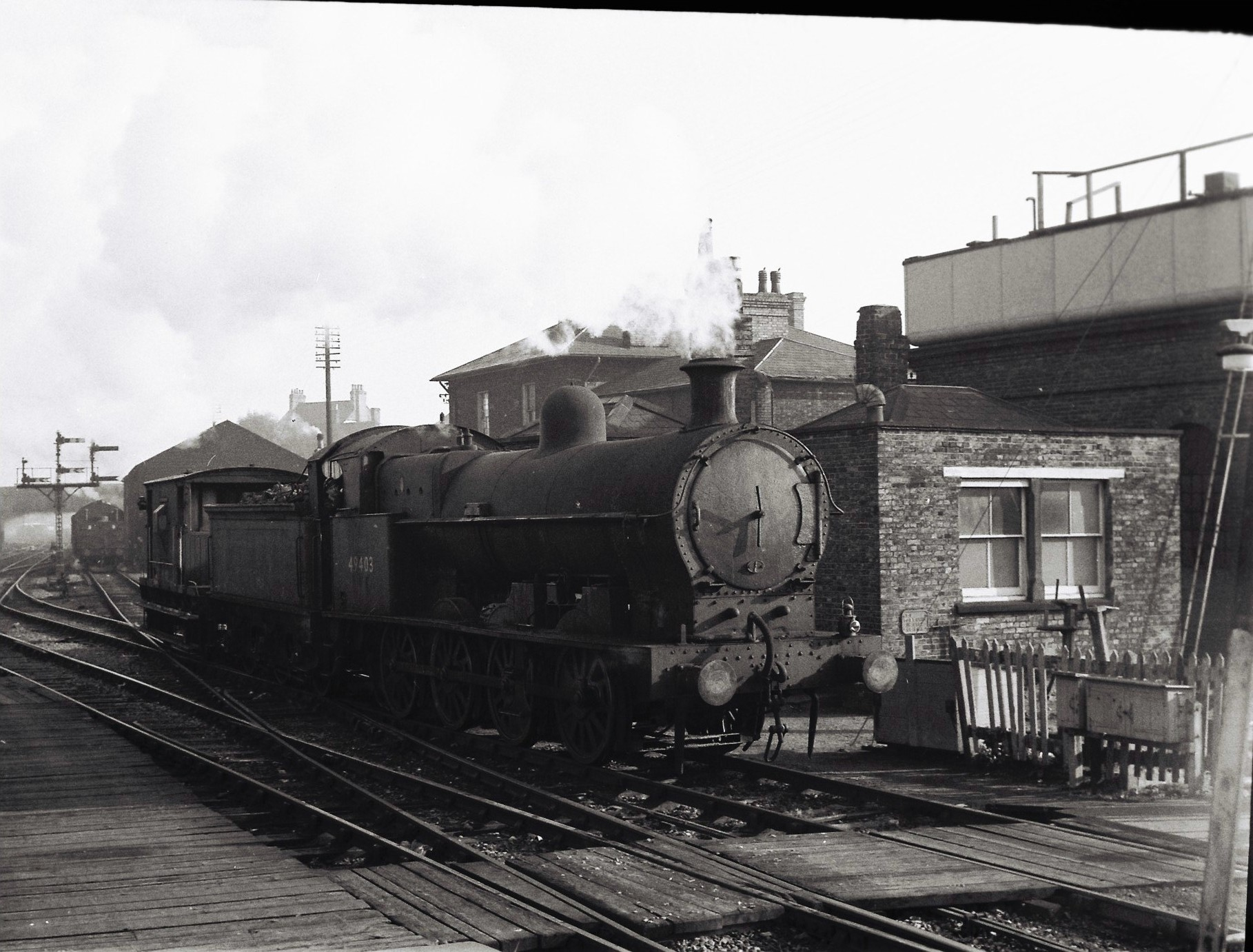
An LNWR 0-8-0 49403 leaves Leighton Buzzard railway station for the Dunstable branch

The Dunstable Branch Lines were railway branch lines that joined the English town of Dunstable to the main lines at Leighton Buzzard and Welwyn. The two lines were under separate ownership and joined just east of the Dunstable North station.

The line from Leighton Buzzard to Dunstable North was authorised by the Dunstable and London and Birmingham Railway Act 1845 (8 & 9 Vict. c. xxxvii), and built by the London and North Western Railway. This opened in 1848.

The Luton, Dunstable and Welwyn Junction Railway planned a connecting line from the Great Northern Railway at Welwyn. The line between Dunstable and Luton opened in 1858. The company then amalgamated with the Hertford and Welwyn Junction Railway to form the Hertford, Luton and Dunstable Railway. The track to Welwyn was completed in 1860 and the line was taken over by the Great Northern in the following year. It became part of the London and North Eastern Railway from 1923 until British Railways was formed in 1948.

Passenger services were withdrawn in 1965 under the Beeching Axe, and the track between Dunstable and Leighton Buzzard was removed. The line between Dunstable and the Midland Main Line at Luton remained open for freight until 1990. Dunstable is now one of the largest towns in the East of England without a railway connection.

== Stations ==
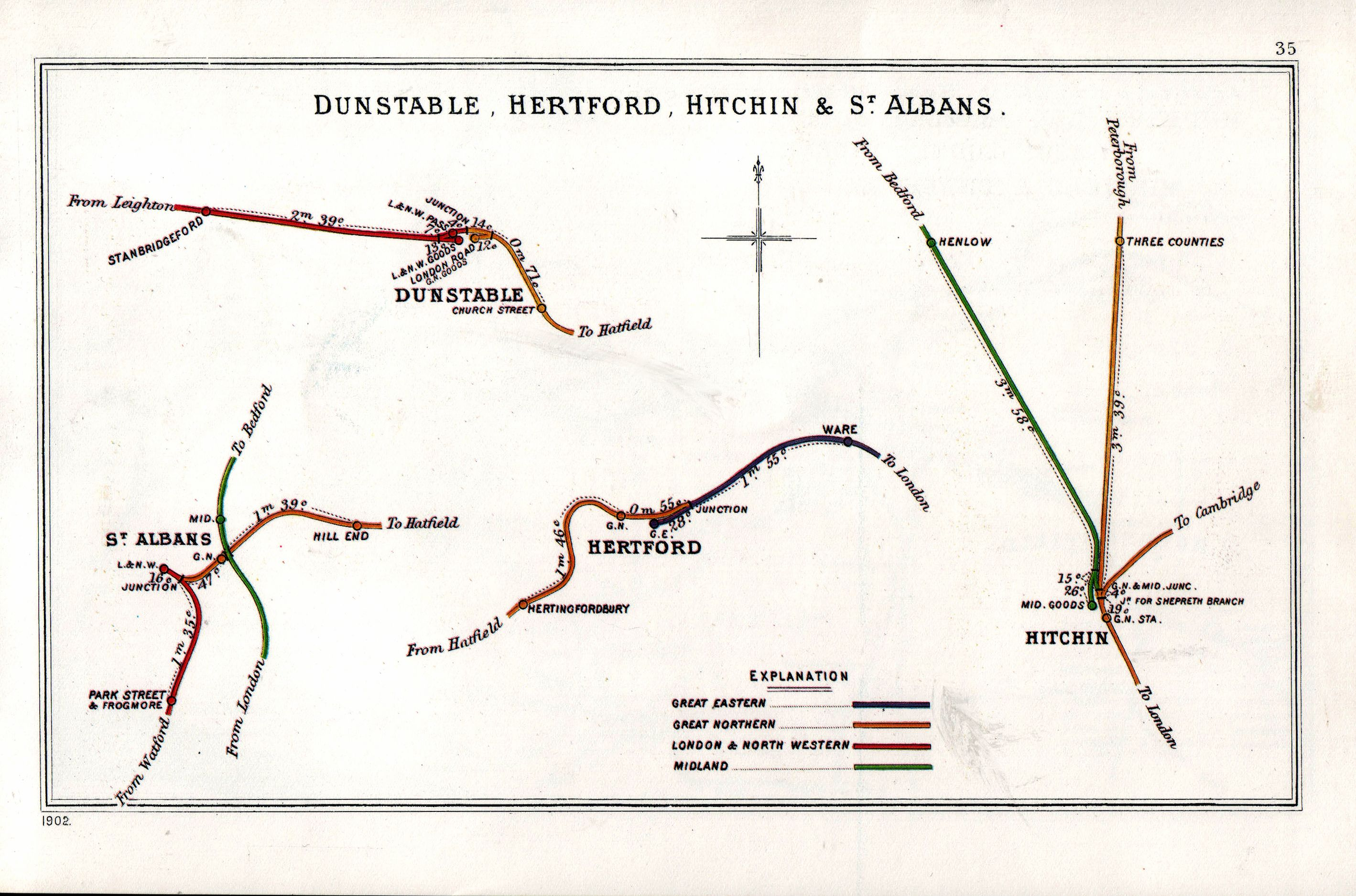
A 1902 Railway Clearing House map of railways in the vicinity of Dunstable (upper left)

=== Stanbridgeford ===
Stanbridgeford railway station (51°53′50.00″N 0°35′29.00″W) was close to the village of Stanbridge.

=== Dunstable North ===
Dunstable North railway station was originally the terminus of the line from Leighton Buzzard.

=== Dunstable Town ===
Dunstable Town railway station (51.8866°N 0.5106°W) (originally Dunstable Church Street) was the terminus station on the spur off the Great Northern Railway from Hatfield. It served the town of Dunstable until closure in 1965. The station was immortalised in 1964 in the song "Slow Train" by Flanders and Swann. The station was on Station Road.

=== Luton Bute Street ===
Luton Bute Street railway station (51.88173°N 0.41372°W) was the first to be built in Luton. It was opened in 1858.

It was valuable to Luton people not only for passengers but also facilitating the London market for the town's trade in plaited straw goods. The station closed in 1965.

=== Luton Hoo ===
Luton Hoo railway station (51°50′57″N 0°22′32.7″W) was opened in 1860 and originally called New Mill End. The name changed to Luton Hoo in 1891 and the station closed in 1965.

It served Luton Hoo house and the village of New Mill End. It was close to the Midland Railway station of Chiltern Green and the GNR and Midland lines took a parallel course from Luton.

The station building and platform still exist, sited next to a sewage works.

=== Harpenden East ===
Harpenden East (51°49′18.5″N 0°20′26.4″W) was one of two stations serving the town of Harpenden, the other station which remains open being Harpenden Central. Originally named Harpenden, the East suffix was added in 1950 to distinguish it from the Midland Railway station.

The line was single track with a crossing loop.

The station opened in 1860 and closed in 1965. Since closure it has been demolished and housing has been built both on the site of the station and on the line in the immediate area.

=== Wheathampstead ===
Wheathampstead railway station (51.81531°N 0.29202°W) served Wheathampstead.

=== Ayot ===
Ayot railway station (51.81503°N 0.22935°W) served the village of Ayot St Peter. It opened as Ayott St Peters on 2 July 1877, and was named Ayott from 1 April 1878 until October 1878.

The station was destroyed by fire in 1948 and never rebuilt. It closed on 26 July 1948.

=== Welwyn Junction ===
Trains initially ran to temporary wooden platforms at Welwyn (on the site of the present Welwyn Garden City railway station). From 1 September 1860 trains ran on to Hatfield, and the temporary platforms were closed. The present station was opened in 1926.

== Passenger services ==
The last passenger train, packed with enthusiasts, was hauled by Brush Type 2 D5589 on 24 April 1965.

== Freight services ==
A goods service serving the Bedford Trucks factory in Dunstable continued until well into the 1980s.

== Subsequent use of the line ==
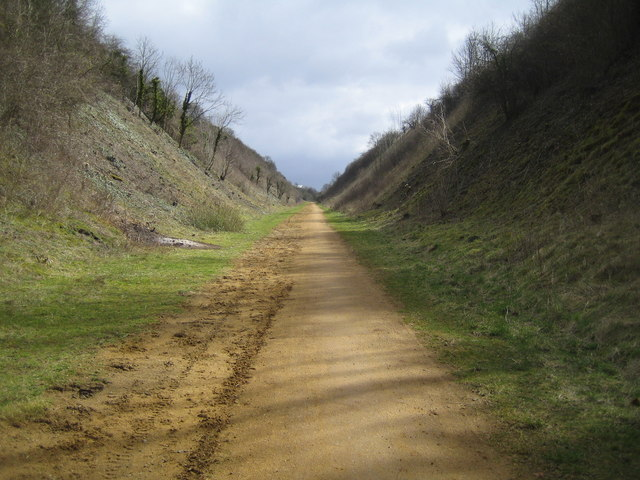
National Cycle Route 6 at Sewell Cutting

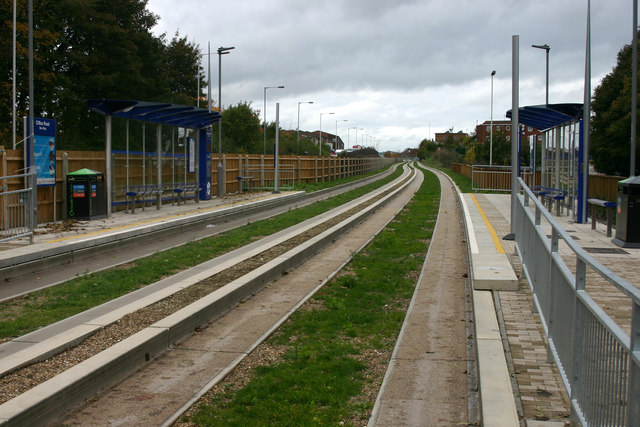
The new guided busway route

Within Leighton Buzzard, the line is now used as a footpath and cycleway which crosses the Grand Union Canal and River Ouzel. Between Leighton Buzzard and Stanbridgeford, it was used to build part of the A505 Leighton-Linslade Southern Bypass. National Cycle Route 6 follows the line between Stanbridgeford and Dunstable, including Sewell Cutting, which is managed as a nature reserve by the Wildlife Trust for Bedfordshire, Cambridgeshire and Northamptonshire.

The line between Dunstable and Luton has never been legally decommissioned. The track has been removed and a guided busway was constructed on the old trackbed, the Luton to Dunstable Busway, which opened in 2013. Buses run on this route as far as Dunstable Town and then divert via the old cement works.

The Lea Valley Walk follows the line between Luton Hoo and Harpenden. East of Wheathampstead, heading towards Welwyn Garden City, the trackbed was converted to a path called the Ayot Greenway.

== See also ==
- List of closed railway stations in Britain
