= Frieth =

Village in Buckinghamshire, England

Coordinates: 51.604962°N 0.8483°W

- Location within Buckinghamshire
- OS grid reference: SU797902
- Civil parish: Hambleden
- Unitary authority: Buckinghamshire
- Ceremonial county: Buckinghamshire
- Region: South East
- Country: England
- Sovereign state: United Kingdom
- Post town: HENLEY-ON-THAMES
- Postcode district: RG9
- Dialling code: 01494
- Police: Thames Valley
- Fire: Buckinghamshire
- Ambulance: South Central
- UK Parliament: Wycombe

Frieth is a village in the parish of Hambleden, in Buckinghamshire, England. It lies on the top of "Frieth Hill", which is part of the chalk escarpments of the Chiltern Hills.

Frieth. Picture taken from a south angle.

Frieth lies at a height of around 550 feet (170 m), on the edge of a broad and deep winterbourne chalk valley in which are located the older settlements of the parish and adjacent parishes – Hambleden, Skirmett, Turville, and Fingest. Because of the shortage of surface water and the relatively poor soils – heavy clay and flint overlaying the permeable chalk – Frieth did not develop into a village until well into Victorian times. However, there are a number of ancient properties and Frieth has all the symbols of a traditional English village. As well as the church, it has a village hall, a village green, two rural pubs, a village society, fine open hilly countryside, and a small but thriving primary school. The village shop and dairy has closed.

== Parmoor House ==
In the 12th century, Parmoor House was owned by the Knights Templar. After falling into ruin it was rebuilt by the new Earl of the hundred in 1352. The property was then lost to the crown around 1790 when the incumbent Earl was supplanted by George III with a John "Frith" whose surname was to be that of the village. Although Frith never took up residence, on his death in 1791, the property was bought by the Cripps Family of Berkshire. It was the birthplace of Sir Stafford Cripps, the post-war Chancellor of the Exchequer. During the war, it was let to King Zog of Albania. In 1947, the Anglican Community of St Katharine of Alexandria moved to Parmoor House from Fulham to provide care for elderly ladies. Later the house became home for the Community of the Sue Ryder Prayer Fellowship. St Katharine's, Parmoor, Frieth, Henley-on-Thames is now a retreat home and conference centre welcoming all for day or residential visits.

== King Zog ==
During the Second World War Frieth was home to King Zog of Albania. King Zog lived at Parmoor House with his wife Queen Geraldine, their son Crown Prince Leka (the late King Leka I), and the King's sisters, nephews and nieces. The King also had a group of bodyguards who lived nearby and some Ministers who lived at Lane End. After the war they left to go to Egypt but one nephew stayed in Frieth.

== Frieth Church ==
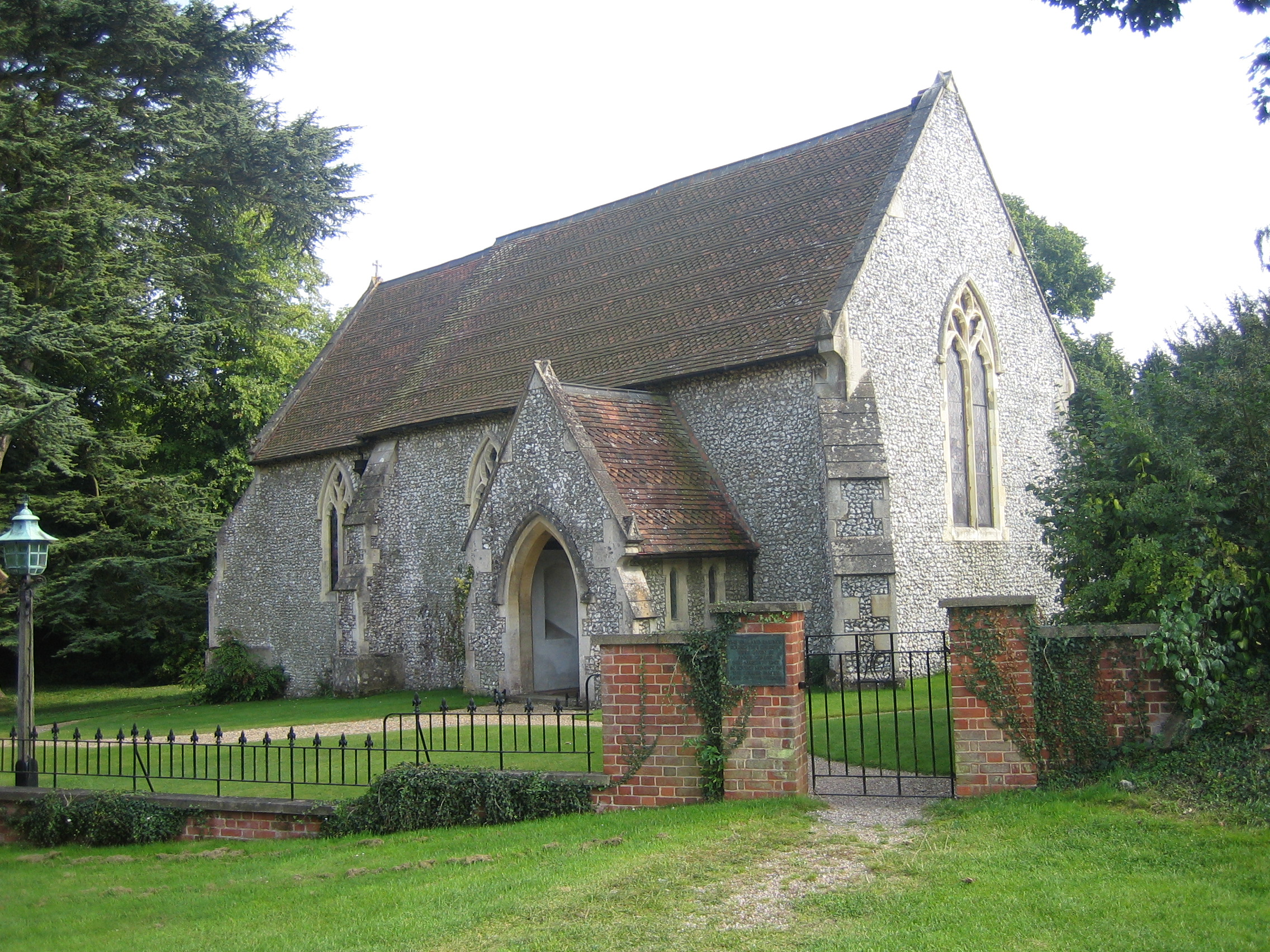
St. John the Evangelist in Frieth

Frieth Church was built in 1848 as a chapel of ease for Hambleden. It is now part of the parish of Hambleden with Frieth and Skirmett. Flint from the ruined wing of the Old Rectory (now Kenricks) at Hambleden was used for the new church built to the design of JP Harrison. The South aisle was added later, probably by Woodyer dated 1872 on the rainwater heads. The church is built of flint with stone mullions and edges, and has an attractive tiled roof but no tower or turret.

The church is noted for its Victorian stained glass and carved woodwork. Most of the furniture and carving in the church were made by the local firm of West and Collier. Most of the beautiful stained glass windows were the gift of the Cripps family. They date from 1880 and include St John the Evangelist, Abraham and Isaac, Moses and the Ten Commandments (North wall), Benjamin and Joseph, and King David on the south aisle.

The Church Aided school at Frieth is the school for the Hambleden Valley. The school holds services at Frieth Church each term. The Rector is an ex officio Governor of the school.

== Frieth School ==
Frieth Church of England Combined School was established in 1865. The catchment area encompasses the many villages of the Hambleden Valley.

Every October, the PTA of the School organises a 10K run called the Frieth Hilly 10K. This race which starts/finishes at the School involves sections on road, trails and footpaths through woods and fields, including challenging off-road descents and ascents. The race was first held in 2008.
