= Strophosomia =

Congenital disease

Strophosomia is a severe form of congenital ventral fissure, all abdominal and thoracic viscera being free in the uterus.

It is an extreme case of celosomia.

== In humans ==
It is a very rare dysmorphic feature in humans.

== In farm animals ==
The condition occurs regularly in calves and lambs. The spine is flexed 180° so that the caudal region is near the neck, in so-called schizosoma reflexum.

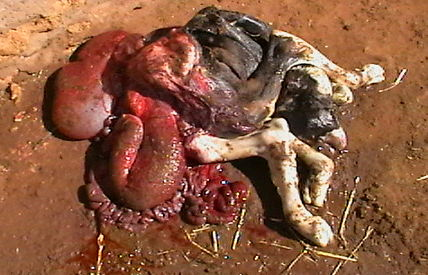
in a calve

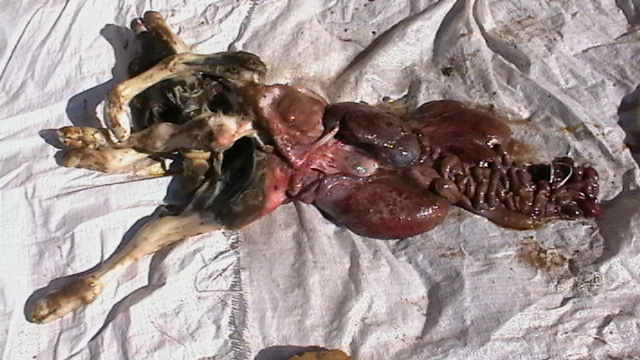
in an other calve

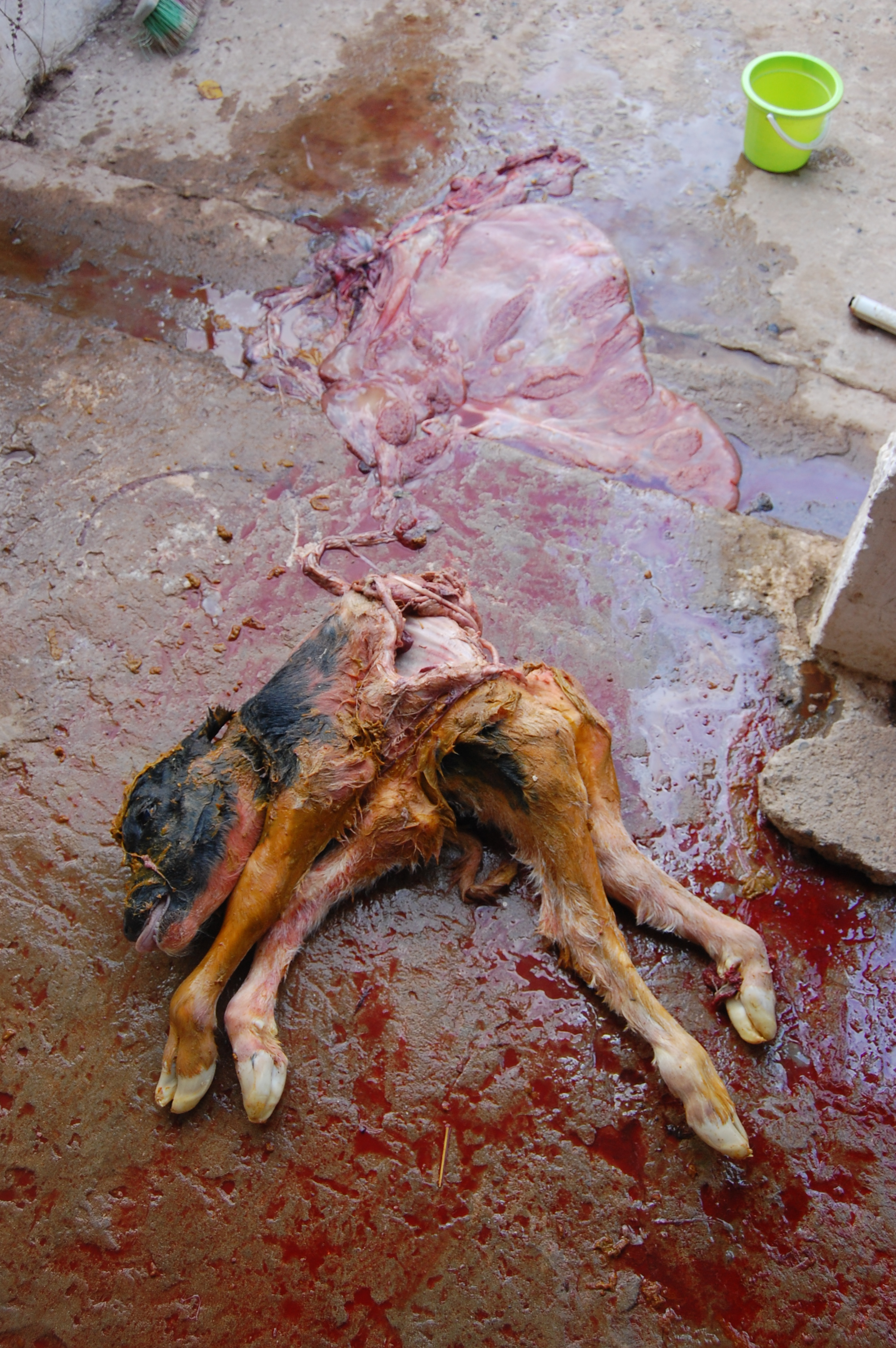
with placenta, after cesarian section; viscera had been removed by a former obstetrician

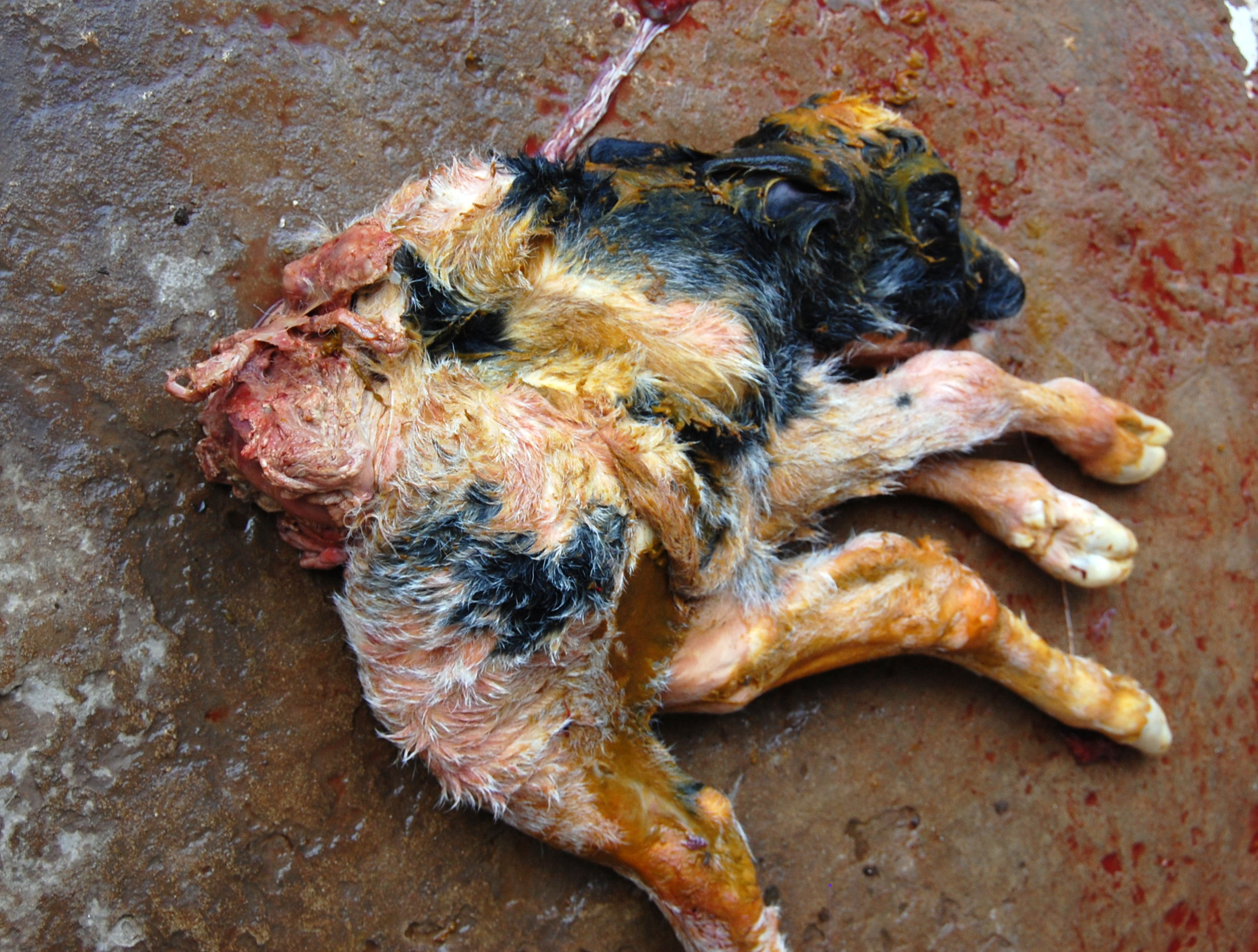
same case, showing total bending of spinal cord

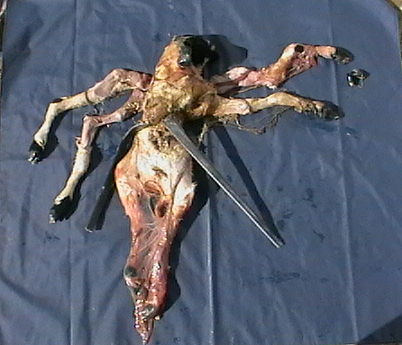
in a lamb

During the obstetrical operations, the viscera are reached first, but the four limbs fold backwards may be barely accessible.

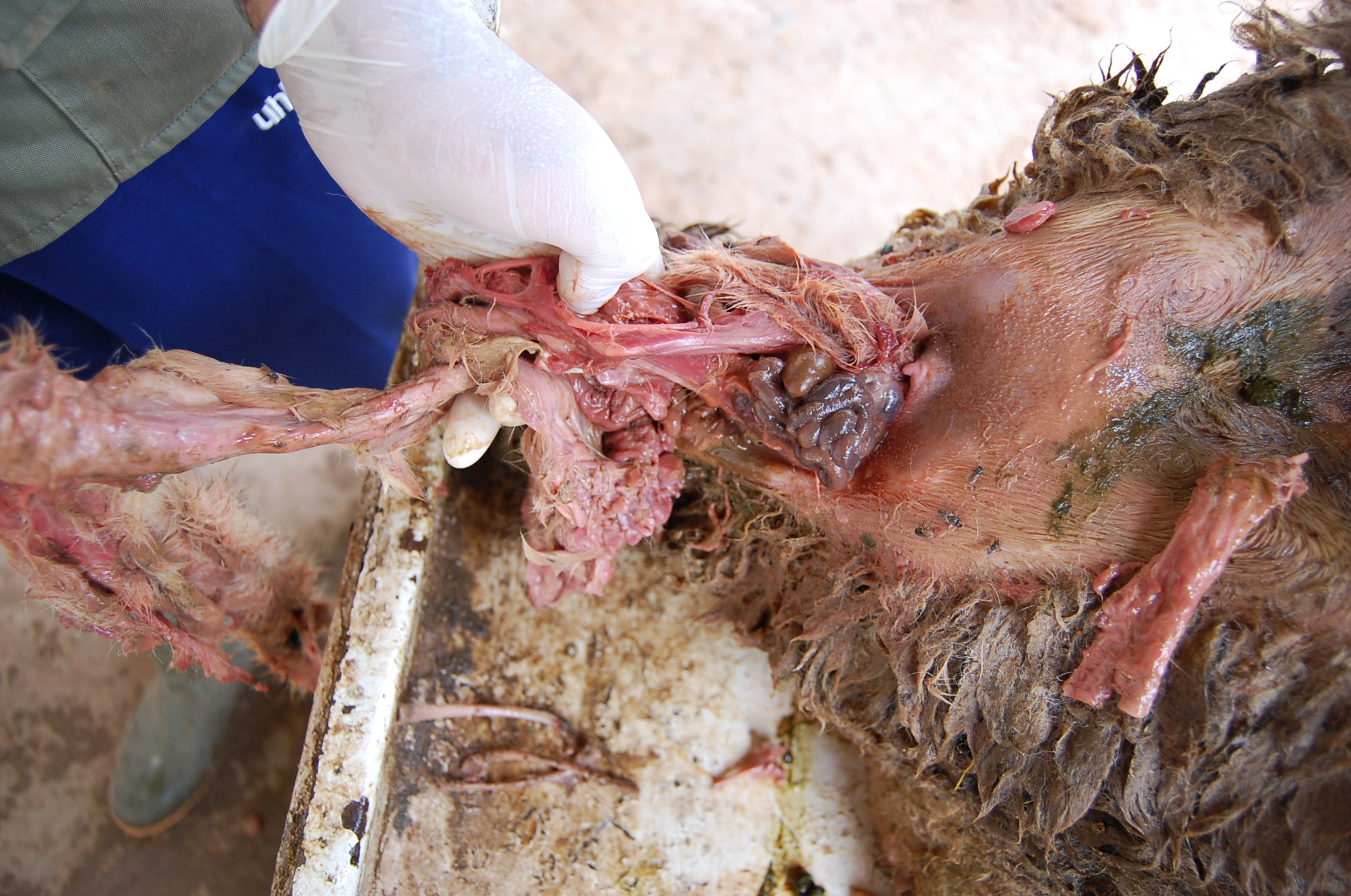
extraction of viscera of a lamb with strophosomia

Cesarian section is often required in cows. Fetotomy can resolve the condition in ewes.
