= Hambleden Mill =

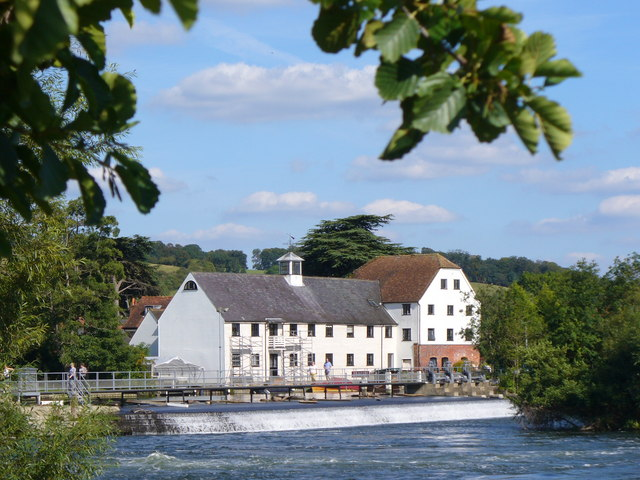
- Hambleden Mill and Weir

- Location within Buckinghamshire
- 51°33′32″N 0°52′11″W
- Type: Watermill
- Location: Hambleden
- OS grid reference: SU 78447 85042

History
- Built: Late 18th century

Site notes
- Area: Buckinghamshire
- Architectural style: Georgian

Listed Building – Grade II
- Official name: 1-10, Hambleden Mill
- Designated: 21 June 1955
- Reference no.: 1310707

Hambleden Mill is an historic watermill on the River Thames at Mill End, near the village of Hambleden in Buckinghamshire, England. It is linked by a footbridge to Hambleden Lock, which is on the Berkshire side of the river. It was Grade II listed in 1955 and has now been converted into flats. Alongside the mill is Hambleden Marina which occupies two islands. Along the river frontage to the south-east is the site of a Roman Villa.

== History ==
A mill at Hambleden is recorded in the Domesday Book of 1086, when it was held by Queen Matilda and had a rent of 20 shillings/year, as well as a fishery that yielded 1,000 eels annually. Before 1235 the mill was granted to Keynsham Abbey. Alison Uttley described it as "The most beautiful place in the whole length of the long Thames valley." The oldest part of the present mill building was built in the late 18th century, possibly incorporating part of an earlier 17th century mill. This now forms the southern end of the building and has three main floors plus an attic, making it the tallest part of the building. This wing has half-hipped gables and plain tiles on the roof. A 19th century addition to the west, two stories high with a slate roof, stretches along the river front.

In the late 19th century, a barge, Maid of the Mill, used to make a weekly journey with flour from the mill to Huntley & Palmers biscuit factory in Reading. On her return trip she carried broken biscuits for sale, cheap, to the local villagers. The mill was still in use in the 1950s having been upgraded from the original waterwheel and grinding stones to a water-turbine driving steel rollers in about 1939. It had fallen out of use by the early 1970s, and planning permission for conversion to apartments was granted in 1974. The extensive renovations involved re-cladding in white shiplap boarding, and replacement of its many windows with 20th century casements, sashes and some horizontal sliding sashes in the 18th century attic windows.

Next to the mill, away from the river, is Mill House, also a grade II listed building. This was built in around 1770, for use by the mill-owner, with flint walls and a rendered and whitewashed frontage.

== Locality ==
The mill is adjacent to a series of weirs which stretch across the River Thames, running diagonally across the river, to Hambleden Lock, which is on the western, Berkshire, bank of the river. The weir raises the upstream water level, which both provided the fast flow of water for the original watermill, and maintains a navigable depth of water above the weir. The lock raises or lowers boats travelling up and down the river past the weir. A footbridge follows the line of the weir right across the Thames, allowing pedestrian access between the path alongside Hambleden Mill and the Thames riverside path which runs in both directions on the Berkshire side of the river. The area has been a popular visitor spot for many decades, with large numbers of postcards showing the mill, weir and lock and a popular subject with artists.

The two Hambleden Mill Islands lie in the river alongside the mill. The mill-stream that used to funnel water to the water-wheel on the front of the mill creates an island accessed via a bridge. And this, plus another island alongside it are now used by Hambleden Marina for Thames riverboat mooring facilities.

To the south-east of the marina a Roman Villa site fronting on to the Thames was identified in 1921 from parchmarks in the grass during a dry summer. In the hot summer of 1975 enough detail of wall outlines appeared to enable a survey of the villa and its ancillary buildings and boundaries, including possible wharves and landing stages along the river frontage. The site was given legal protection as a scheduled monument in 1979. It is thought to be a subsidiary development from the nearby Yewdon Villa.

Hambleden Mill and islands in the River Thames.

== Conservation Area ==
The mill is within the Mill End, Hambleden Conservation Area, first designated in 1982. The conservation area includes both the hamlet of Mill End and the estate of Yewden Manor. The conservation area also falls within the Chiltern Hills Area of Outstanding Natural Beauty.

== See also ==
- Islands in the River Thames
- List of crossings of the River Thames
- Locks and weirs on the River Thames
