= Chiltern Hills =

Range of hills in south-east England

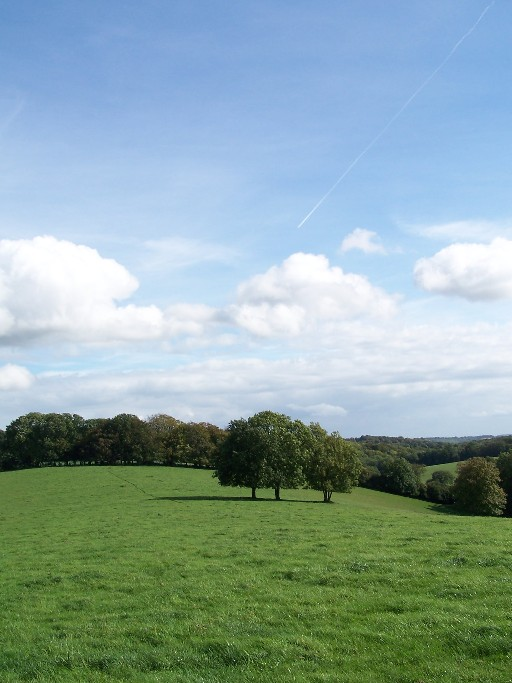
- Near Nettlebed, Oxfordshire

Highest point
- Peak: Haddington Hill
- Elevation: 267 m (876 ft)

Dimensions
- Length: 74 km (46 mi)
- Width: 18 km (11 mi)
- Area: 1,700 km^{2} (660 mi^{2})

Geography
- Location of the Chiltern Hills AONB in England
- Location: South East of England, East of England
- Country: United Kingdom
- Counties: Bedfordshire, Buckinghamshire, Hertfordshire, Oxfordshire
- Range coordinates: 51°40′N 0°55′W

Geology
- Rock type: chalk downland

The Chiltern Hills or the Chilterns (/ˈtʃɪltən/) are a chalk escarpment in southern England to the north-west of London, covering 660 mi^{2} (1,700 km^{2}) across Oxfordshire, Buckinghamshire, Hertfordshire and Bedfordshire. The hills stretch 45 miles (72 km) from Goring-on-Thames in the south-west to Hitchin in the north-east, and are 12 miles (19 km) at their widest.

In 1964, 322 mi^{2} (830 km^{2}) - almost half of the Chiltern Hills - were designated by the Countryside Commission as an Area of Outstanding Natural Beauty (AONB) under the powers established by the National Parks and Access to the Countryside Act 1949.

The north-west boundary of the Chilterns is clearly defined by the escarpment. The dip slope is by definition more gradual and merges with the landscape to the south-east. The south-west endpoint is the River Thames. The hills decline slowly in prominence in north-east Bedfordshire.

== Toponymy ==
The toponym, Chiltern, is believed to be Brittonic in origin. According to Eilert Ekwall, Chiltern is possibly related to the broader ethnic name Celt (Celtæ in early Celtic languages); the root celto- "high" (and suffix -erno-) could provide the origin of Chiltern.

== History ==
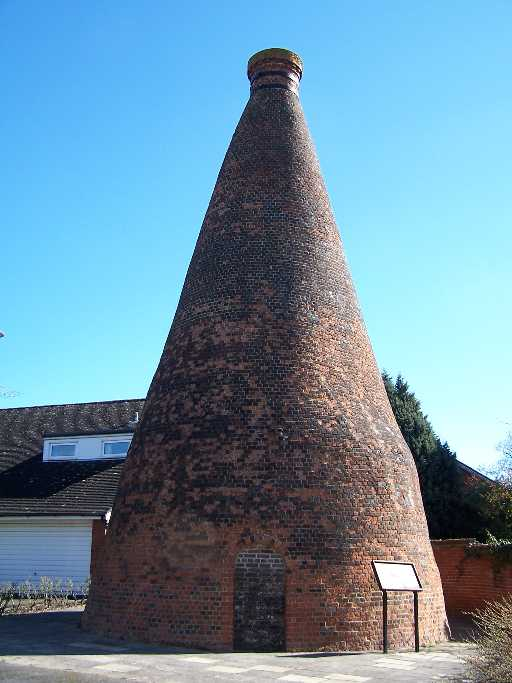
Bottle kiln, Nettlebed, probably from the late 17th century

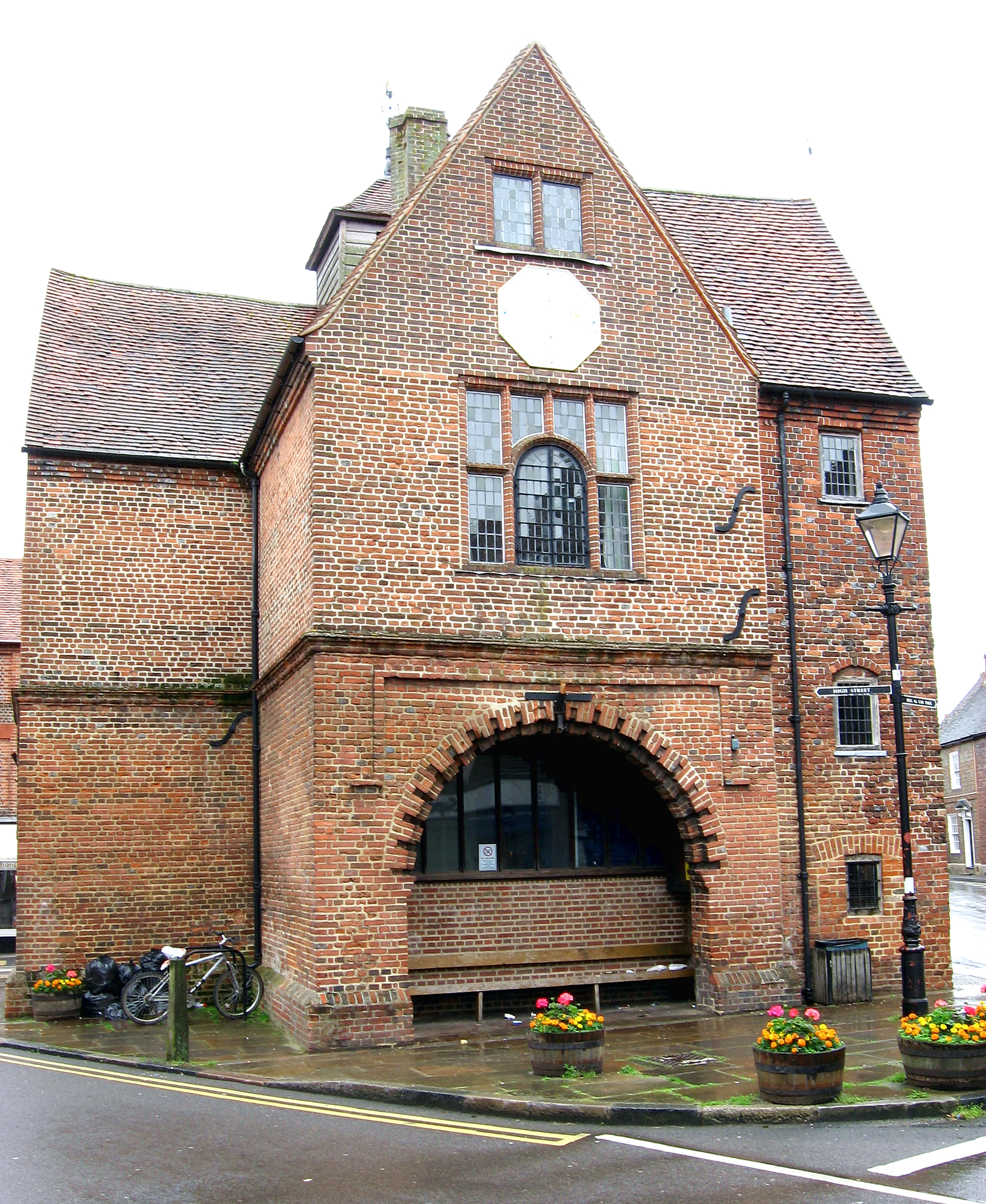
Watlington Town Hall

During the Iron Age, the Chiltern ridge provided a relatively safe and easily navigable route across southern Britain.

Before the 18th century, the population lived dispersed across the largely rural landscape of the Chilterns in remote villages, hamlets, farmsteads, and market towns along the main turnpike routes which coursed through the navigable valleys. The development of canals in the 18th century and railways in the 19th century encouraged settlement and the growth of High Wycombe, Tring and Luton. Significant housing and industrial development took place throughout the 20th century.

In 1965, almost half of the Chiltern Hills was designated as an AONB.

== Geology ==
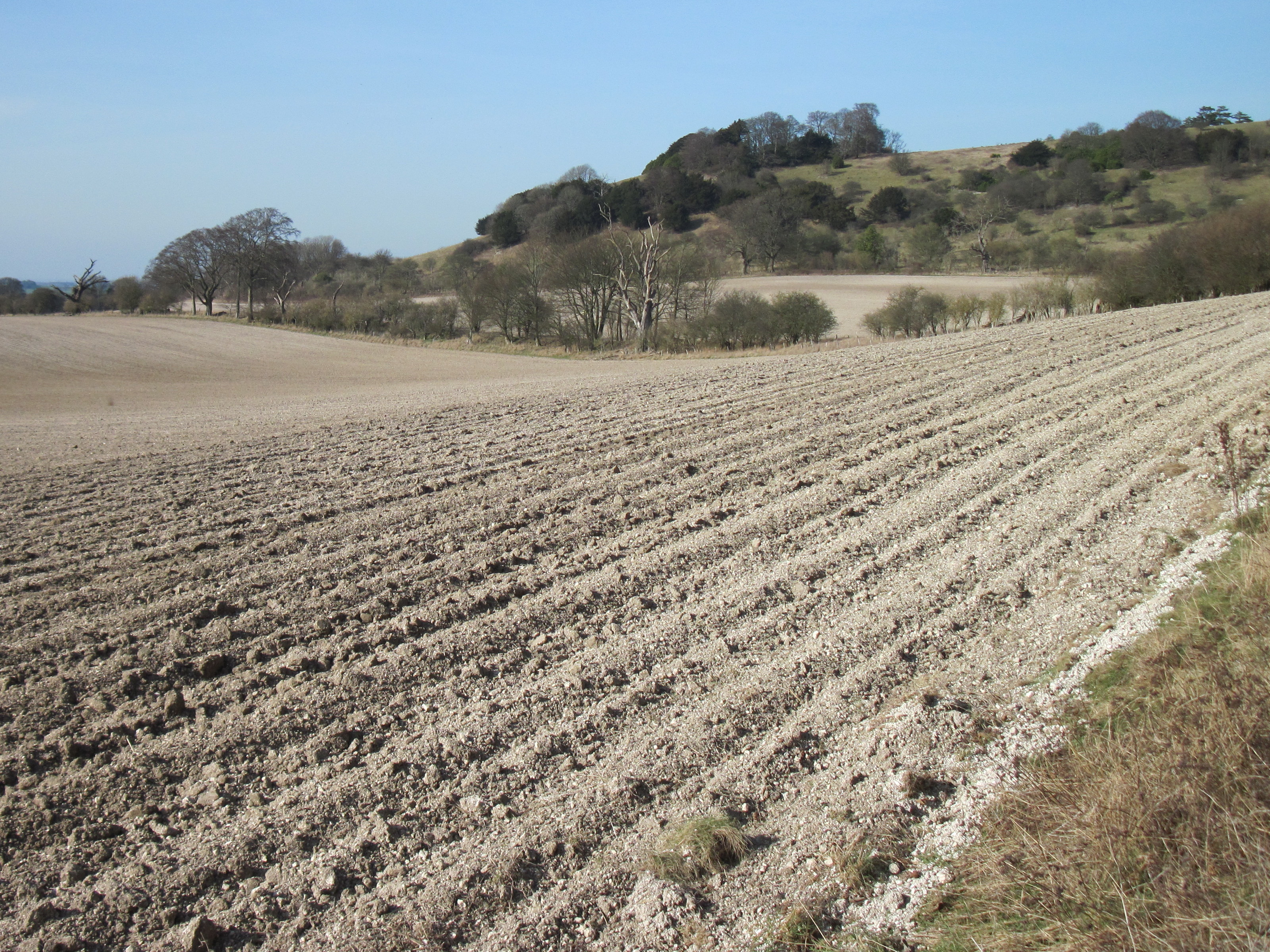
Chalk visible in ploughed soil at the foot of the Chiltern Hill escarpment near Shirburn, on the Buckinghamshire/Oxfordshire border

The chalk escarpment of the Chiltern Hills overlooks the Vale of Aylesbury and roughly coincides with the southernmost extent of the ice sheet during the Anglian glacial maximum. The Chilterns are part of a system of chalk downlands throughout eastern and southern England, consisting of rocks of the Chalk Group, formed between 95 and 65 million years ago; it also includes Salisbury Plain, Cranborne Chase, the Isle of Wight and the South Downs in the south. In the north, the chalk formations continue north-eastwards across Hertfordshire, Norfolk and the Lincolnshire Wolds, finally ending as the Yorkshire Wolds in a prominent escarpment, south of the Vale of Pickering.

The beds of the Chalk Group were deposited over the buried north-western margin of the Anglo-Brabant Massif during the Late Cretaceous. During this time sources for siliciclastic sediment had been eliminated owing to the exceptionally high sea level. The formation is thinner through the Chiltern Hills than the chalk strata to the north and south and deposition was tectonically controlled, with the Lilley Bottom structure playing a significant role at times. The base of the Chalk Group, like the underlying Gault Clay and Upper Greensand, is diachronous.

During the late stages of the Alpine Orogeny, as the African Plate collided with Eurasian Plate, Mesozoic extensional structures, such as the Weald Basin of southern England, underwent structural inversion. This phase of deformation tilted the chalk strata to the south-east in the area of the Chiltern Hills. The gently dipping beds of rock were eroded, forming an escarpment.

The chalk strata are frequently interspersed with layers of flint nodules, which apparently replaced chalk and infilled pore spaces early in the diagenetic history. Flint has been mined for millennia from the Chiltern Hills. It was first extracted for fabrication into flint axes in the Neolithic period, then for knapping into flintlocks. Nodules are to be seen everywhere in the older houses as a construction material for walls.

== Physical characteristics ==
=== Topography ===
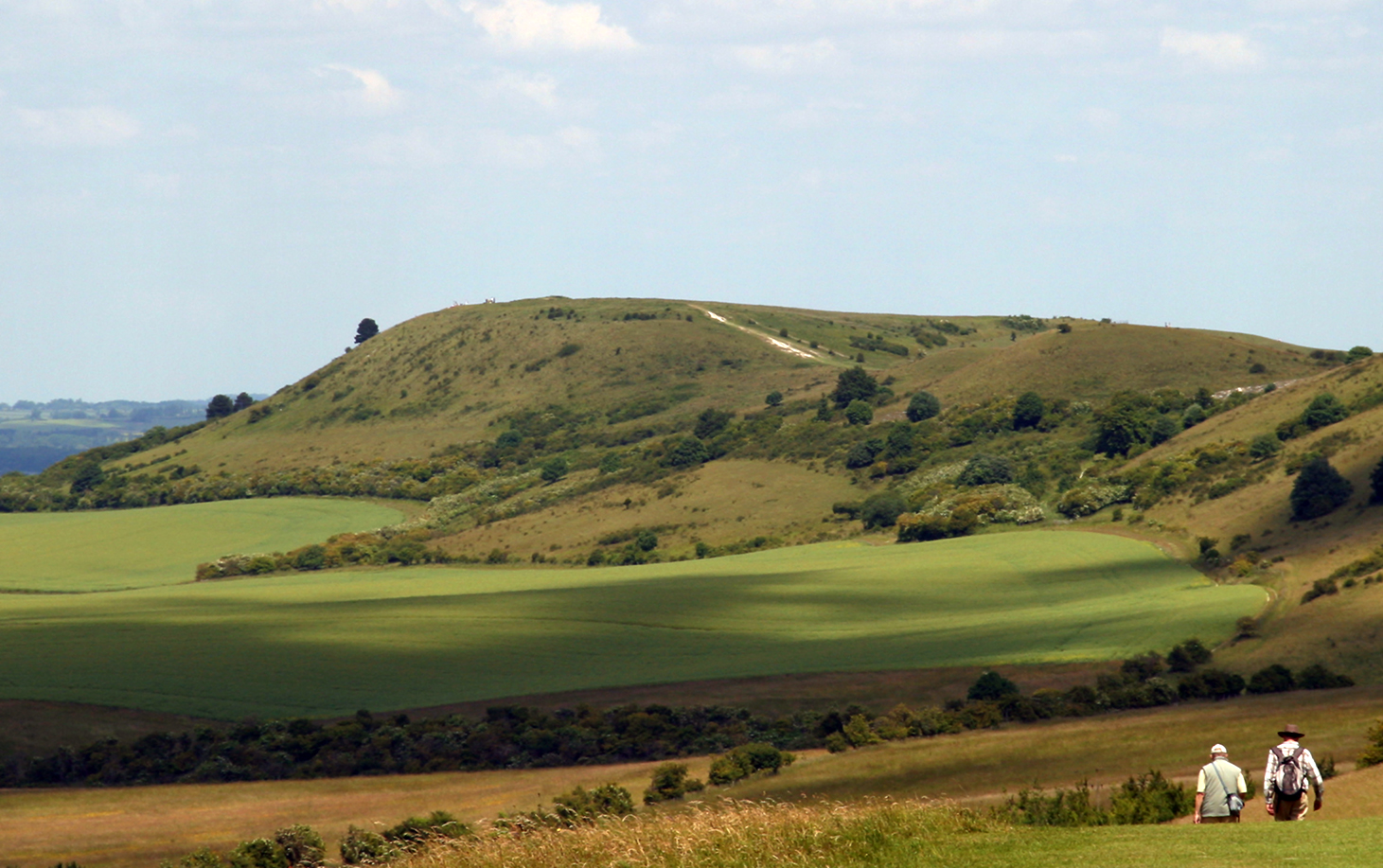
Viewed from The Ridgeway: eastern trailhead on Ivinghoe Beacon

The highest point is 267 metres (876 ft) above sea level at Haddington Hill, near Wendover in Buckinghamshire; a stone monument marks the summit. The nearby Ivinghoe Beacon is a more prominent hill, although its altitude is only 249 metres (817 ft). It is the starting point of the Icknield Way Path and the Ridgeway long-distance path, which follow the line of the Chilterns for many miles to the west, where they merge with the Wiltshire downs and southern Cotswolds.

To the east of Ivinghoe Beacon are the Dunstable Downs, a steep section of the Chiltern scarp. Near Wendover is Coombe Hill, 260 metres (850 ft) above sea level. The more gently sloping country – the dip slope – to the south-east of the Chiltern scarp is also generally referred to as part of the Chilterns and contains much beech woodland and many villages.

=== Landscape and land use ===
Enclosed fields account for almost 66% of the AONB. The next most important, and archetypal, landscape form is woodland, covering 21% of the Chilterns, which is thus one of the most heavily wooded areas in England. Built-up areas (settlements and industry) make up more than 5% of the land area; parks and gardens nearly 4%; open land (commons, heaths and downland) is 2%; and the remaining 2% includes a variety of uses, including communications, military, open land, recreation, utilities and water.

=== Rivers ===
The Chiltern Hills are almost entirely within the River Thames drainage basin and also drain towards several major Thames tributaries, most notably the Lea, which rises in the eastern Chilterns, the Colne to the south and the Thame to the north and west.

Other rivers arising near the Chilterns include the Mimram, the Ver, the Gade, the Bulbourne, the Chess, the Misbourne and the Wye. These are classified as chalk streams, although the Lea is degraded by water from road drains and sewage works. The Thames flows through a gap between the Berkshire Downs and the Chilterns. Portions around Leighton Buzzard and Hitchin are drained by the Ouzel, the Flit and the Hiz, all of which ultimately flow into the River Great Ouse; the last two via the Ivel.

=== Transport ===
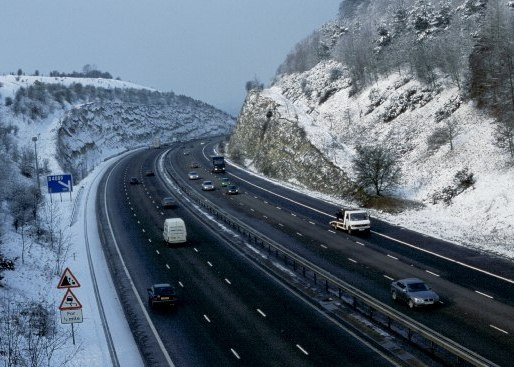
Stokenchurch Gap, a cutting built to carry the M40 motorway through a section of the Chilterns

Several transport routes pass through the Chilterns in natural or human-made corridors. There are also over 2,000 km (1,200 mi) of public footpaths, including long-distance trackways such as the Icknield Way and The Ridgeway.

The M40 motorway passes through the Chilterns in Buckinghamshire and Oxfordshire sections with a deep cutting through the Stokenchurch Gap. The M1 motorway crosses the Bedfordshire section near Luton. Other major roads include the A41 and the A413.

The Chiltern Main Line, via High Wycombe and Princes Risborough; the London to Aylesbury Line, via Amersham; the West Coast Main Line, via Berkhamsted; and the Midland Main Line all run through the Chiltern Hills. The Great Western Main Line and its branches, such as the Henley and Marlow branch lines, link the southern side of the Chilterns with London Paddington. The Chinnor and Princes Risborough Railway is a preserved heritage line.

High Speed 2 (HS2) will pass underneath the Chilterns in the Chiltern Tunnel; the longest under construction on the route will be 16 km (9.9 miles) in length. The Conservation Board was opposed to the routing of HS2 through the Chilterns AONB.

Bus services are provided by Arriva Shires & Essex and Carousel Buses.

Air corridors from Luton Airport pass over the Chilterns.

Apart from the Thames, there are no navigable rivers. The Grand Union Canal passes through the Chilterns between Berkhamsted and Marsworth, following the course of the Gade and Bulbourne. Also, after crossing a watershed, the Ouzel is partly in the Chilterns.

== List of towns and villages ==
- Aldbury, Amersham, Apsley, Ashridge, Aston Clinton
- Barton-le-Clay, Beaconsfield, Bellingdon, Berkhamsted, Bledlow Ridge, Bovingdon, Bradenham, Breachwood Green, Buckland Common
- Caddington, Chalfont St Giles, Chalfont St Peter, Chartridge, Checkendon, Cheddington, Chesham, Chiltern Green, Chinnor, Cholesbury, Christmas Common, Coleshill
- Dagnall, Downley, Dunsmore, Dunstable
- Edlesborough, Ellesborough
- Fawley, Fingest, Flackwell Heath, Frieth
- Gerrards Cross, Goring-On-Thames, Great Hampden, Great Kingshill, Great Missenden, Great Offley
- Halton, Hambleden, Harlington, Hawridge, Hazlemere, Hemel Hempstead, Henley-on-Thames, Hexton, High Wycombe, Hitchin, Holmer Green, Hughenden, Hyde Heath
- Ibstone, Ivinghoe, Jordans, Kensworth
- Lacey Green, Lane End, Latimer, Ley Hill, Lilley, Little Chalfont, Little Gaddesden, Little Kingshill, Little Missenden, Luton
- Markyate, Marlow, Marlow Bottom, Medmenham
- Naphill, Nettlebed, Nuffield
- Penn, Pishill, Pitstone, Prestwood, Princes Risborough, Radnage, Redbourn
- Seer Green, Sharpenhoe, Shiplake, Skirmett, Southend, South Heath, Speen, St Leonards, Stokenchurch, Stoke Poges, Stonor, Streatley (Beds), Studham
- Thame, The Lee, Tring, Turville, Tylers Green
- Walter's Ash, Watlington, Wendover, West Wycombe, Whipsnade, Whitwell, Wigginton, Winchmore Hill, Woodcote.

=== Strip parishes ===
The western edge of the Chilterns is notable for ancient strip parishes; these are elongated parishes with villages in the flatter land below the escarpment, with woodland and summer pastures in the higher land:

- Bedfordshire: Eaton Bray, Toddington, Totternhoe
- Berkshire: Caversham, Cookham, Hurley, Maidenhead, Reading, Ruscombe, Sonning, Twyford, Wargrave, Wokingham
- Buckinghamshire: Aston Clinton, Aylesbury, Bledlow, Bourne End, Buckland, Drayton Beauchamp, Great Kimble, Horsenden, The Lee, Marsworth, Monks Risborough, Pitstone, Princes Risborough, Saunderton, Stoke Mandeville, Weston Turville
- Hertfordshire: Tring, Wigginton
- Oxfordshire: Aston Rowant, Checkendon, Chinnor, Didcot, Ipsden, Lewknor, Mongewell, Newnham Murren, Nuffield, Peppard Common, Pyrton, Shirburn, Sonning Common South Stoke, Wallingford, Watlington.

== Economic use ==
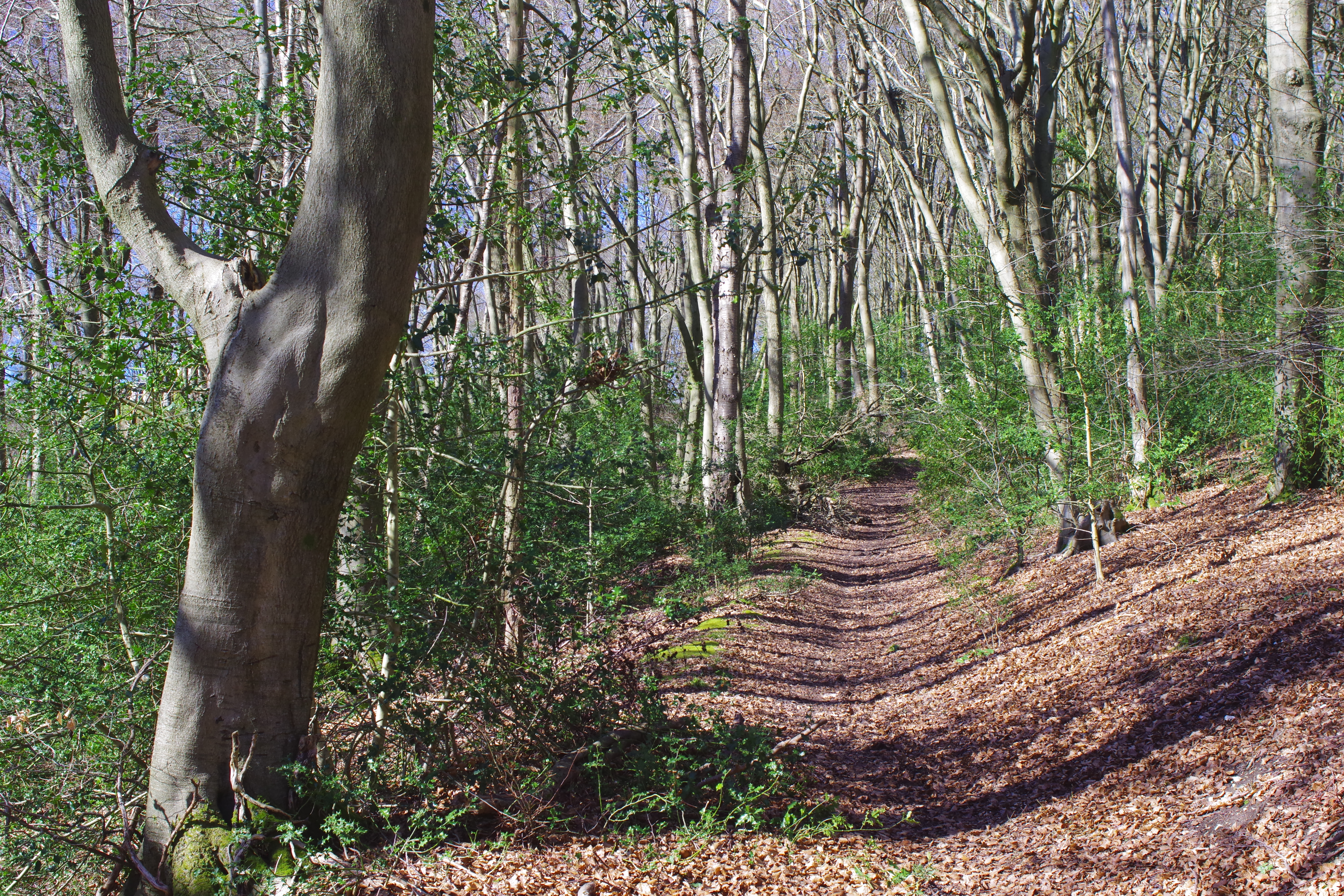
Sunley Wood, near Radnage, Buckinghamshire

The hills have been used for their natural resources for millennia. The chalk has been quarried for the manufacture of cement, and flint for local building material. Beechwoods supplied furniture makers with quality hardwood. The area was once (and still is to a lesser degree) renowned for its chair-making industry, centred on the towns of Chesham and High Wycombe; the nickname of Wycombe Wanderers football club is the "Chairboys".

Water was and remains a scarce resource in the Chilterns. Historically it was drawn from the aquifer via ponds, deep wells, occasional springs or bournes and chalk streams and rivers. The river Chess directly supplies watercress beds. Today the chalk aquifer is exploited via a network of pumping stations to provide a public supply for domestic consumption, agriculture and business uses, both within and well-beyond the Chilterns area. Over-exploitation has possibly led to the disappearance of some streams over long periods.

In a region without building stone, local clay provided the raw materials for brick manufacture; timber and flint were also used for construction.

Mediaeval strip parishes reflected the diversity of land from clay farmland, through wooded slopes to downland. Their boundaries were often drawn to include a section of each type of land, resulting in an irregular county boundary. These have tended to be smoothed out by successive reorganisations.

As people have come to appreciate the open country, the area has become a visitor destination. The National Trust has acquired land to preserve its character, for example at Ashridge, near Tring. In places, with the reduction of sheep grazing, action has been taken to maintain open downland by suppressing the natural growth of scrub and birch woodland. In the 1920s and 1930s, the Youth Hostels Association established several youth hostels for people visiting the hills.

The hills have been used as a location for telecommunication relay stations such as Stokenchurch BT Tower and that at Zouches Farm.

== Protection ==
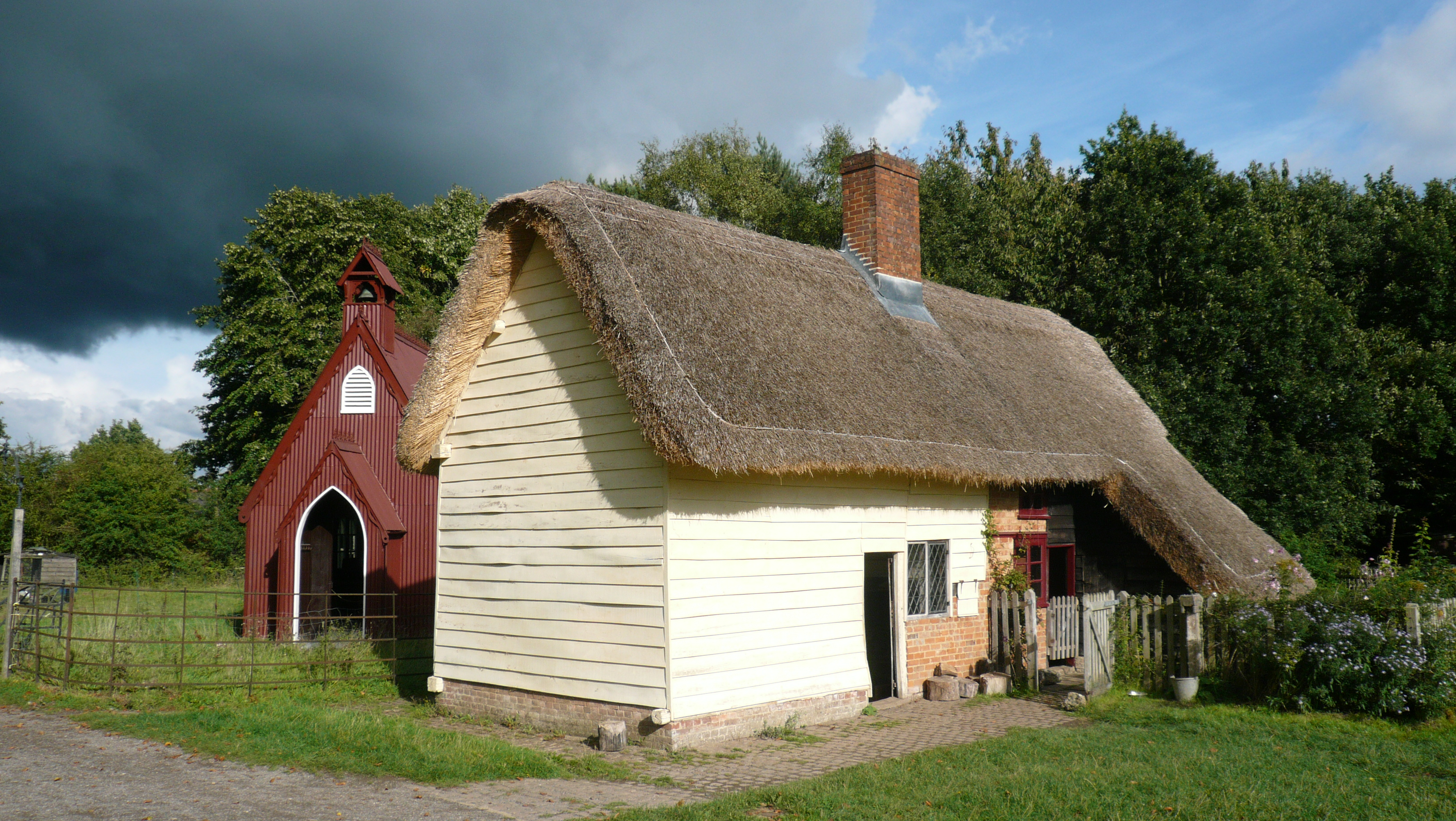
Vernacular architecture of the Chilterns is preserved at the Chiltern Open Air Museum

The Chilterns is an AONB and so enjoys special protection from major developments, which should not take place in such areas except in exceptional circumstances. This protection applies to major development proposals that raise issues of national significance. In 2000, the government confirmed that the landscape qualities of AONBs are equivalent to those of National Parks and that the protection given to both types of area by the land use planning system should also be equivalent.

=== Chilterns Conservation Board ===
The Chilterns Conservation Board was established by Parliamentary Order in July 2004. It is an independent body comprising 27 members, drawn from the relevant local authorities and from those living in local communities within the AONB.

The Board's purposes are set out in the Countryside and Rights of Way Act 2000; in summary, these are:

- First, to conserve and enhance the natural beauty of the AONB, and increase the understanding and enjoyment by the public of the special qualities of the AONB.
- Second, while taking account of the first purpose, to foster the economic and social wellbeing of local communities within the AONB.
- Third, to publish and promote the implementation of a management plan for the AONB.

In contrast to National Parks, the Chilterns – as with other AONBs – do not possess their own planning authority. The Board has an advisory role on planning and development matters and seeks to influence the actions of local government by commenting upon planning applications.

The local authorities (two County Councils, three Unitary Authorities and four District and Borough Councils) are expected to respect the area's status as a designated AONB.

=== Heritage ===
Examples of historical architecture in the Chiltern region are preserved at the Chiltern Open Air Museum, near Chalfont St Giles. This open-air folk museum contains reconstructed buildings which might otherwise have been destroyed or demolished as a result of redevelopment or road construction.

== Chiltern Hundreds ==
The Chilterns include the Chiltern Hundreds. By established custom, Members of Parliament (MPs) in the House of Commons of the United Kingdom, who are prohibited from resigning their seats directly, may apply for the Stewardship of the Chiltern Hundreds as a device to enable their departure from the House.

== Principal summits ==
Hills in The Chilterns National Landscape with more than 30 metres (98 ft) of topographic prominence are listed below.

Rank	Hill	Elevation	Prominence	Grid reference	Parish (county)
1	Wendover Woods	267.5 m (878 ft)	180 m	SP890090	Halton (Buckinghamshire)
2	Coombe Hill	260 m (853 ft)	108 m	SP849066	Ellesborough (Buckinghamshire)
3	Bald Hill	257.2 m (844 ft)	125 m	SU728957	Lewknor (Oxfordshire)
4	Clipper Down	249 m (817 ft)	123 m	SP965151	Ivinghoe (Buckinghamshire)
5	Pulpit Hill	248 m (814 ft)	55 m	SP831050	Great & Little Kimble cum Marsh (Bucks)
6	Whiteleaf Hill	247.3 m (811 ft)	63 m	SP823034	Great & Little Hampden (Bucks)
7	Dunstable Downs	243 m (797 ft)	105 m	TL008194	Whipsnade/Kensworth (Bedfordshire)
8	Beacon Hill	230 m (755 ft)	33 m	SP835060	Ellesborough (Buckinghamshire)
9	Aldbury Nowers	222 m (728 ft)	42 m	SP952136	Aldbury (Hertfordshire)
10	Blow's Down	212 m (696 ft)	48 m	TL034214	Caddington (Bedfordshire)
11	Lodge Hill	209 m (686 ft)	45 m	SP794000	Bledlow-cum-Saunderton (Bucks)
12	Widdenton Park Hill	200.2 m (657 ft)	30.5 m	SU817917	Lane End (Buckinghamshire)
13	Warden Hill	195 m (640 ft)	68 m	TL091260	Streatley (Bedfordshire)
14	Telegraph Hill	184 m (604 ft)	45 m	TL118288	Lilley (Hertfordshire)
15	Bradenham Hill	182.3 m (598 ft)	48.7 m	SU815971	Bledlow-cum-Saunderton (Bucks)
16	Frieth Hill	179 m (587 ft)	36 m	SU792906	Hambleden (Buckinghamshire)
17	Slough Hill	171 m (561 ft)	30 m	SU808979	Bledlow-cum-Saunderton (Bucks)

The following summits, south of the Thames, are outside the NL but within the Chilterns NCA:

Hill	Elevation	Prominence	OS grid reference
Ashley Hill	145 m (476 ft)	107 m	SU823810
Bowsey Hill	142 m (466 ft)	55 m	SU806802
Fultness Wood Hill	113 m (371 ft)	46 m	SU856846
