= Skirmett =

Coordinates: 51°36′09″N 0°52′48″W

- Hamlet
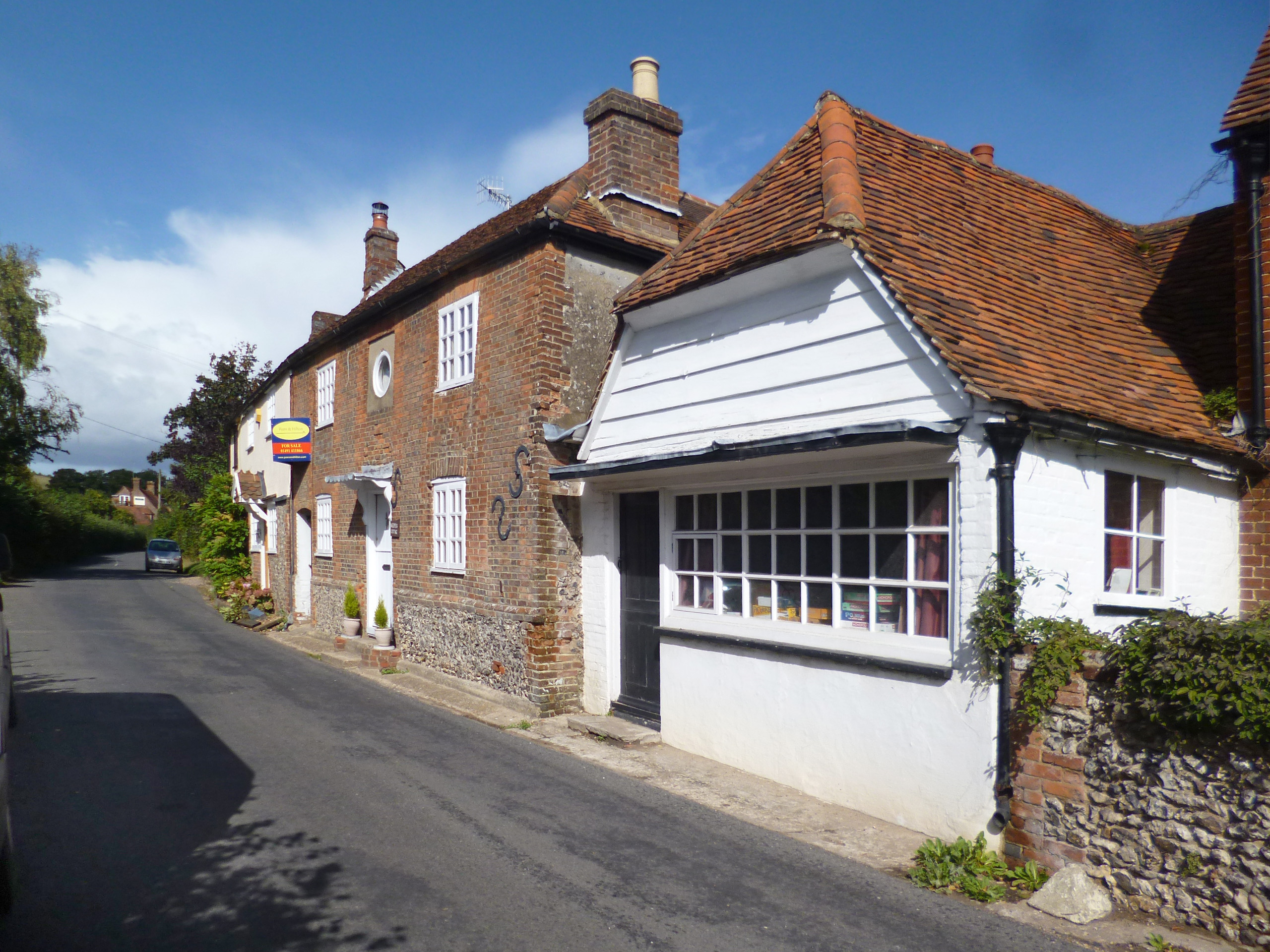
- The Old Shop in Skirmett

- Location within Buckinghamshire
- OS grid reference: SU775899
- Civil parish: Hambleden
- Unitary authority: Buckinghamshire
- Ceremonial county: Buckinghamshire
- Region: South East
- Country: England
- Sovereign state: United Kingdom
- Post town: HENLEY-ON-THAMES
- Postcode district: RG9
- Dialling code: 01491
- Police: Thames Valley
- Fire: Buckinghamshire
- Ambulance: South Central
- UK Parliament: Wycombe

Skirmett is a hamlet in the parish of Hambleden, in Buckinghamshire, England. It lies in the Hambleden Valley in the Chiltern Hills, between the villages of Hambleden and Fingest.

== Toponymy ==
In 1307, the name was noted as Skiremote, which is believed to derive from the early English words, Scir or shire, and Mot or meeting place.

== History ==
Remains of a Roman villa were discovered in the grounds of Poynatts Manor in 1912.

The simple flint church of All Saints dated from the mid-19th century and has now been deconsecrated and converted into a private house.

There is a line of brick and timber-framed cottages along one side of the road and a public house, The Frog, an 18th-century coaching inn.

Formerly there was a police presence in the village, and the local policeman was housed with his family in Hope Cottage, but this was sold and is now a private residence.

== Gallery ==
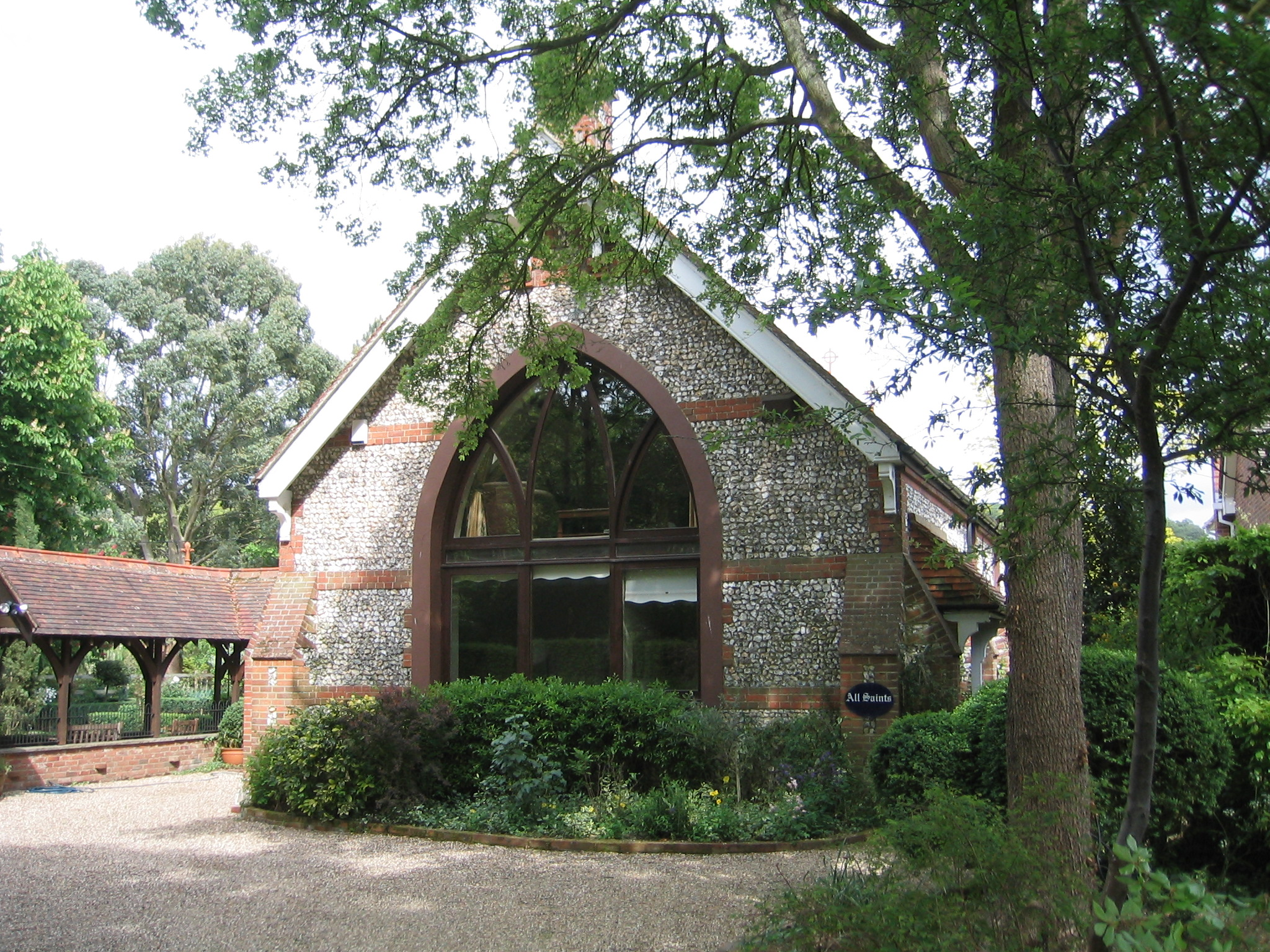
All Saints - now a private home

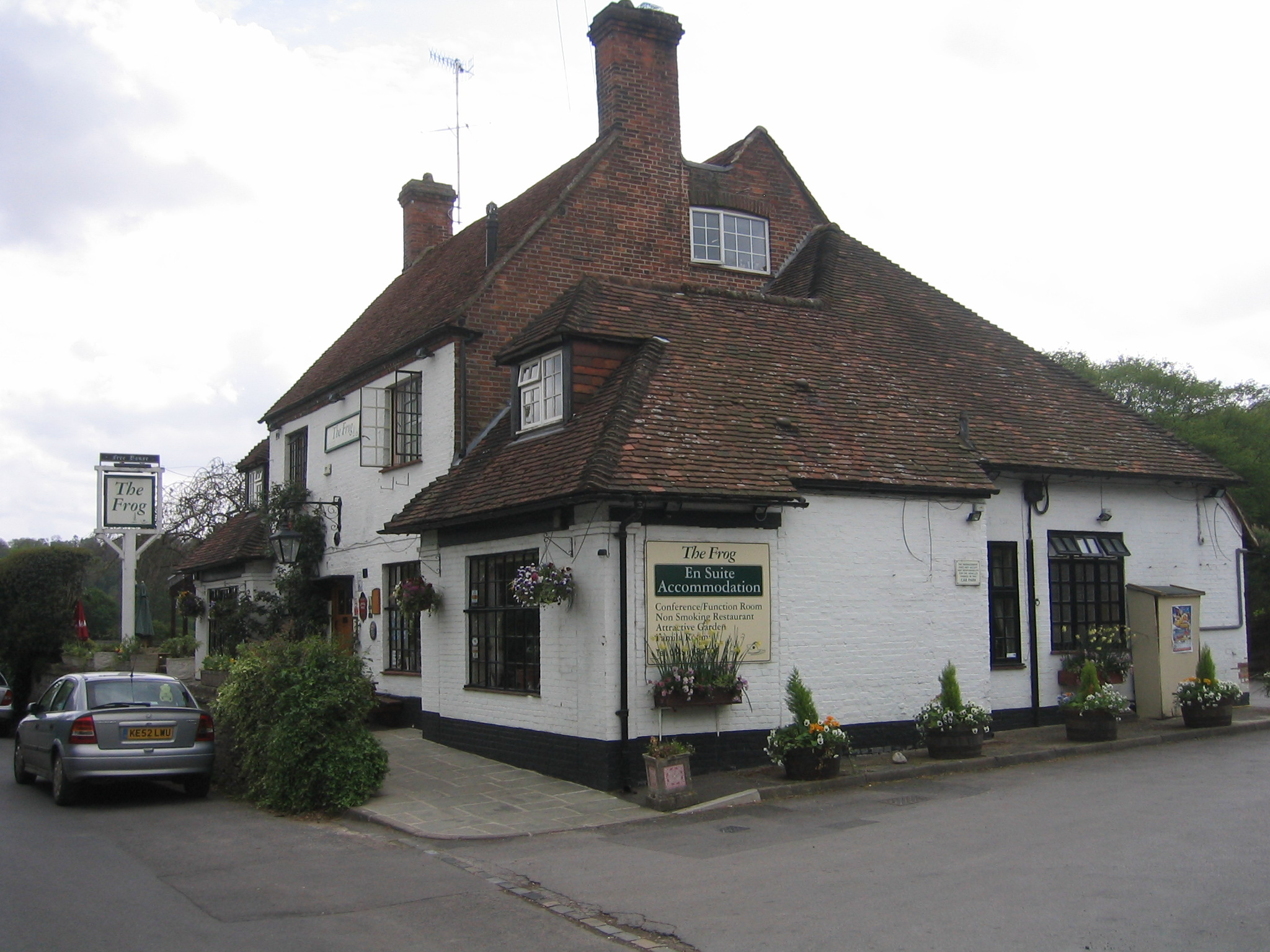
The Frog

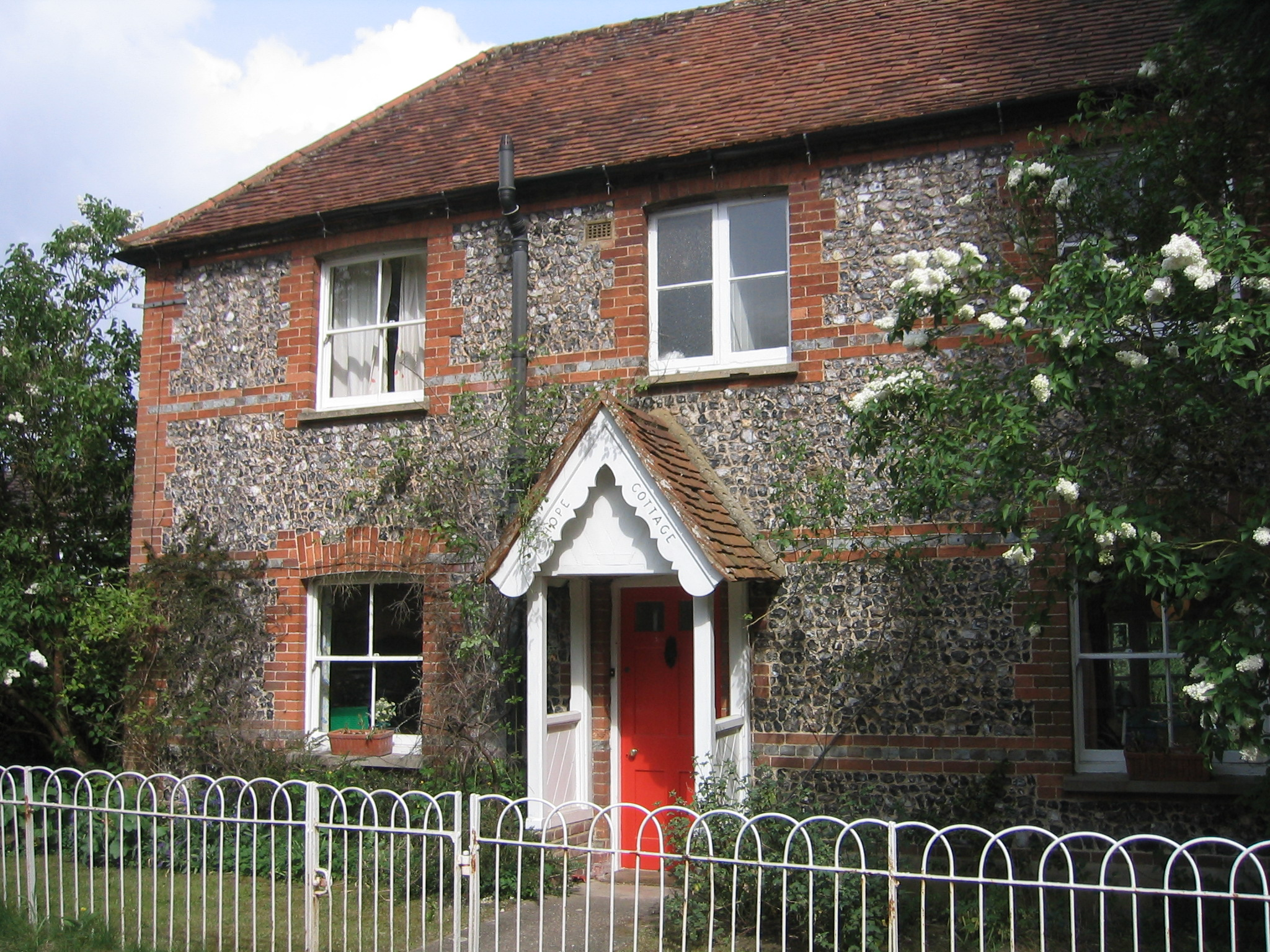
Hope Cottage – The former police house
