= Theriogenology =

Veterinary specialty concerning reproduction

Theriogenology is a specialty of veterinary medicine concerned with animal reproduction. This includes the physiology and pathology of male and female reproductive systems of animals and the clinical practice of veterinary obstetrics, gynecology, andrology and assisted reproductive technologies (ART). Theriogenologists are veterinarians with advanced training in animal reproduction like semen analysis, evaluation and processing, breeding soundness, in vitro fertilisation (IVF), embryo transfer and obstetrics. In the United States, all theriogenologists are board-certified by the American College of Theriogenologists. The English word derives from the Greek words for beast (therio), creation (gen), and study (logos).

== See also ==
- Artificial insemination#Other animals
- Animal sexual behavior

== Sources ==
- Dorland, W. A. Newman (2012). Dorland's Illustrated Medical Dictionary. Philadelphia, PA: Saunders/Elsevier. p. 1914. ISBN 978-1-4160-6257-8. OCLC 706780870.
