= Lodge Hill, Buckinghamshire =

Protected area in Buckinghamshire, England

Coordinates: 51.694487°N 0.851913°W

Lodge Hill
- Site of Special Scientific Interest
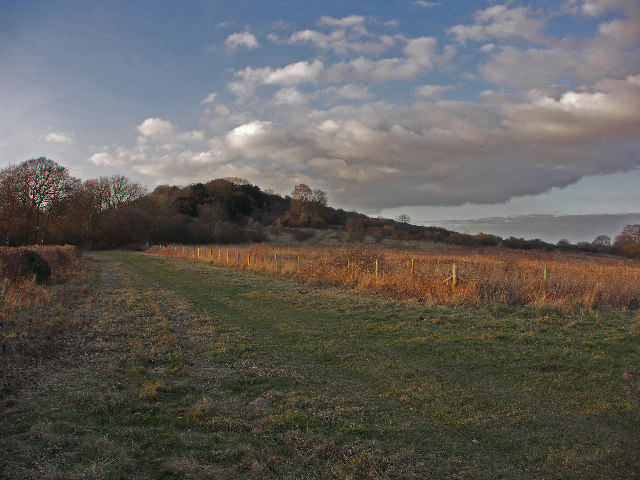
- View towards Lodge Hill
- Location of Lodge Hill.
- Area of search: Buckinghamshire
- Grid reference: SP794001
- Interest: Biological
- Area: 31.8 hectares (79 acres)
- Notification date: 1984
- Location map: Magic Map

Lodge Hill is a 31.8-hectare (79-acre) Site of Special Scientific Interest north of Bledlow Ridge in Buckinghamshire. The local planning authorities are Wycombe District Council and Buckinghamshire County Council. The site is in the Chilterns Area of Outstanding Natural Beauty, and The Ridgeway long-distance footpath crosses it.

There is evidence of prehistoric activity on the site. There are two Late Neolithic or early Bronze Age round barrows, with fragments of Beaker culture pottery. There is also the remains of an Iron Age settlement.

The site is chalk grassland and scrub which is notable for its invertebrates, including butterflies. It has a rare snail, Abide secale, and populations of badgers and slowworms.
