= Veterinary obstetrics =

Subspecialty of veterinary medicine

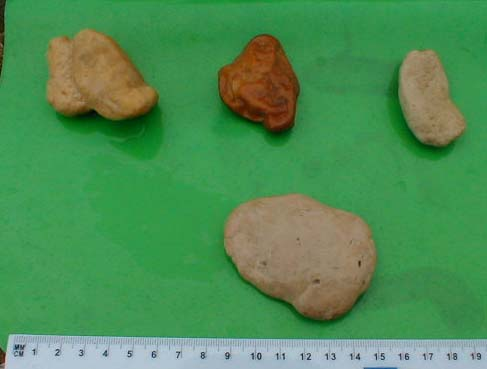
An acellular structure known as hippomanes floating in the alantoic liquid of mares, jennies, and cows

Veterinary obstetrics are the obstetrical methods used in veterinary medicine, which are quite different from those of human medicine. Veterinary obstetrics is a branch of veterinary medicine that deals with medical and surgical care together with manipulations of the female animals in breeding, gestation, labor, puerperium (postpartum period), and care of the newborn.

== Some special cases ==
- Strophosomia

== See also ==
- Pregnancy (mammals)
- Theriogenology
