= Hambleden =

Coordinates: 51°34′18″N 0°52′04″W

- Village and civil parish
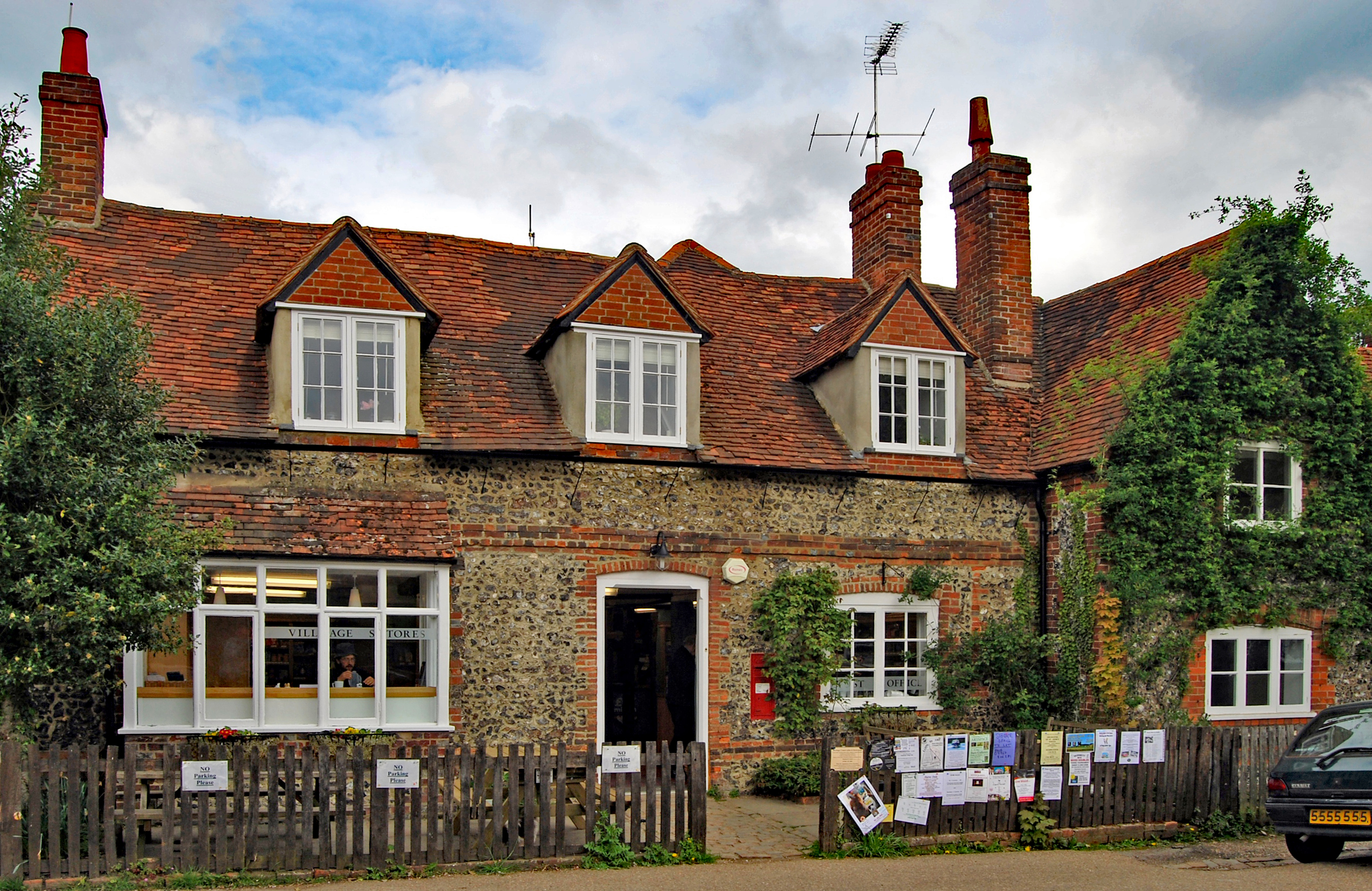
- Hambleden Village Post Office and store

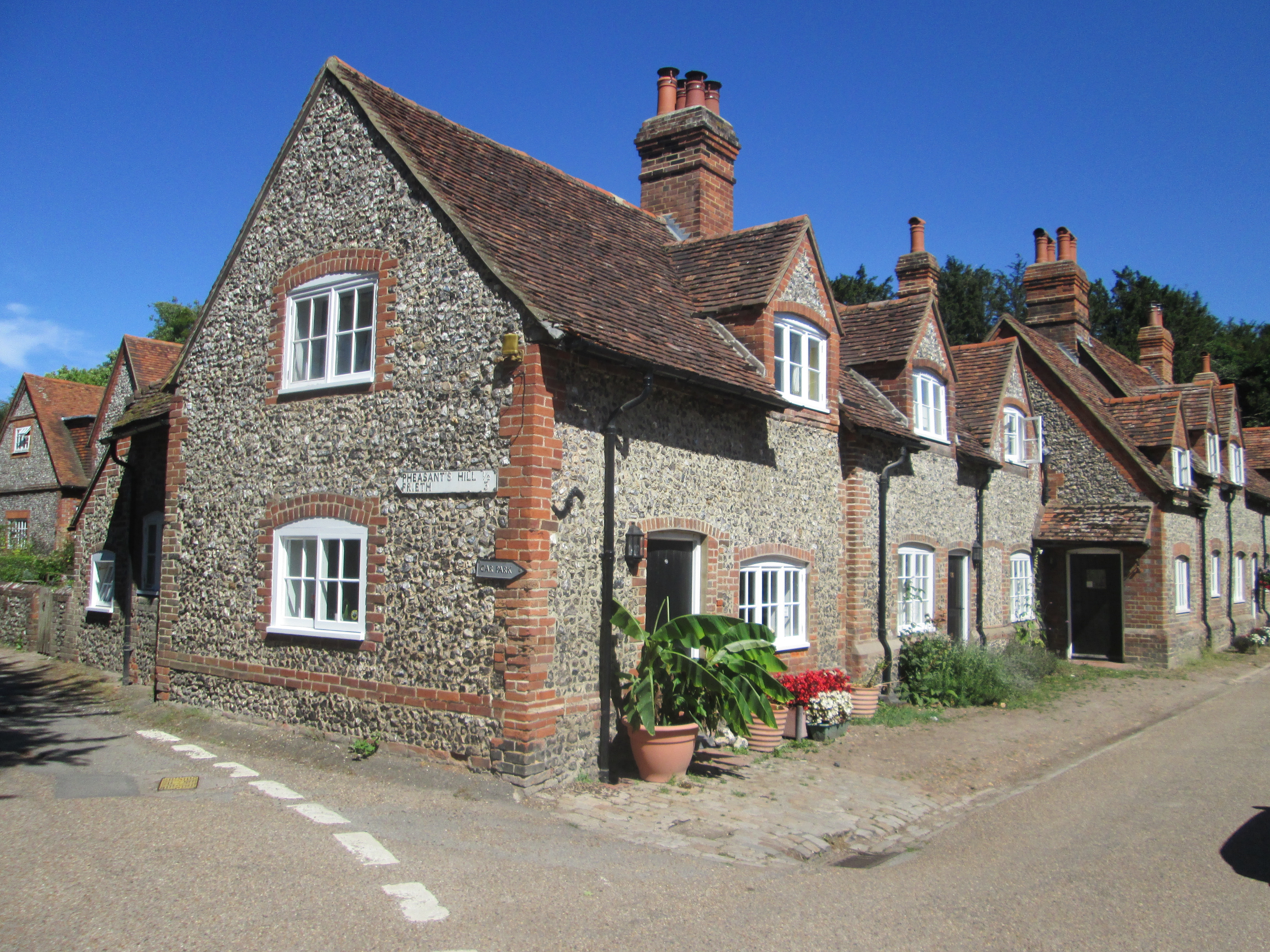
- Listed flint-built cottages

- Location within Buckinghamshire
- Population: 1,445 (2011)
- OS grid reference: SU784865
- Civil parish: Hambleden
- Unitary authority: Buckinghamshire
- Ceremonial county: Buckinghamshire
- Region: South East
- Country: England
- Sovereign state: United Kingdom
- Post town: HENLEY-ON-THAMES
- Postcode district: RG9
- Dialling code: 01491
- Police: Thames Valley
- Fire: Buckinghamshire
- Ambulance: South Central
- UK Parliament: Wycombe

Hambleden is a village and civil parish in southwest Buckinghamshire, England. The village is around 4 miles (6.4 km) west of Marlow, and around 3 miles (4.8 km) north-east of Henley-on-Thames in Oxfordshire.

The civil parish also includes the villages of Fingest and Frieth, and the hamlets of Colstrope, Mill End, Parmoor, Pheasant's Hill and Skirmett. At the 2011 Census, the population of the parish was 1,445.

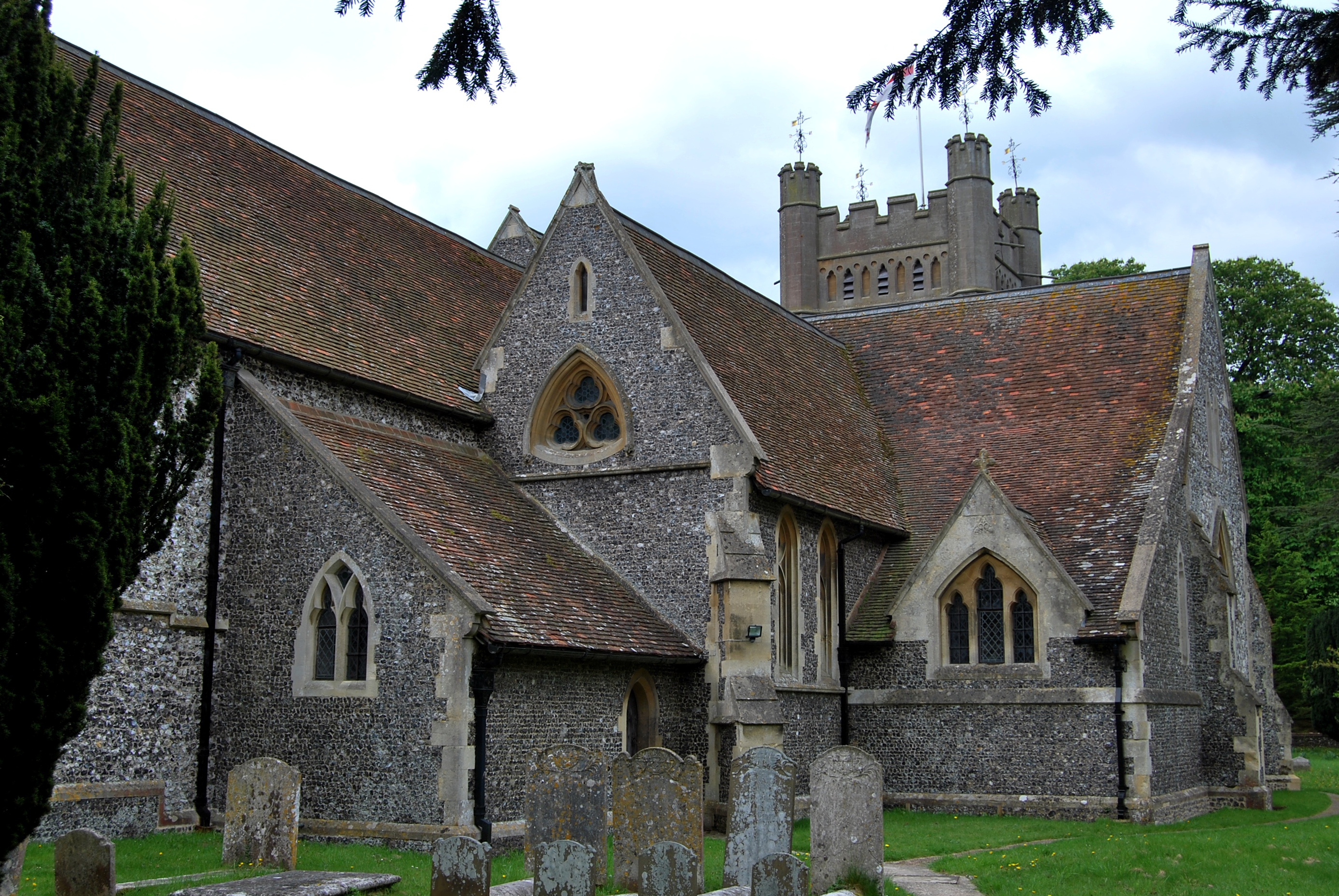
St Mary's Hambleden SW aspect

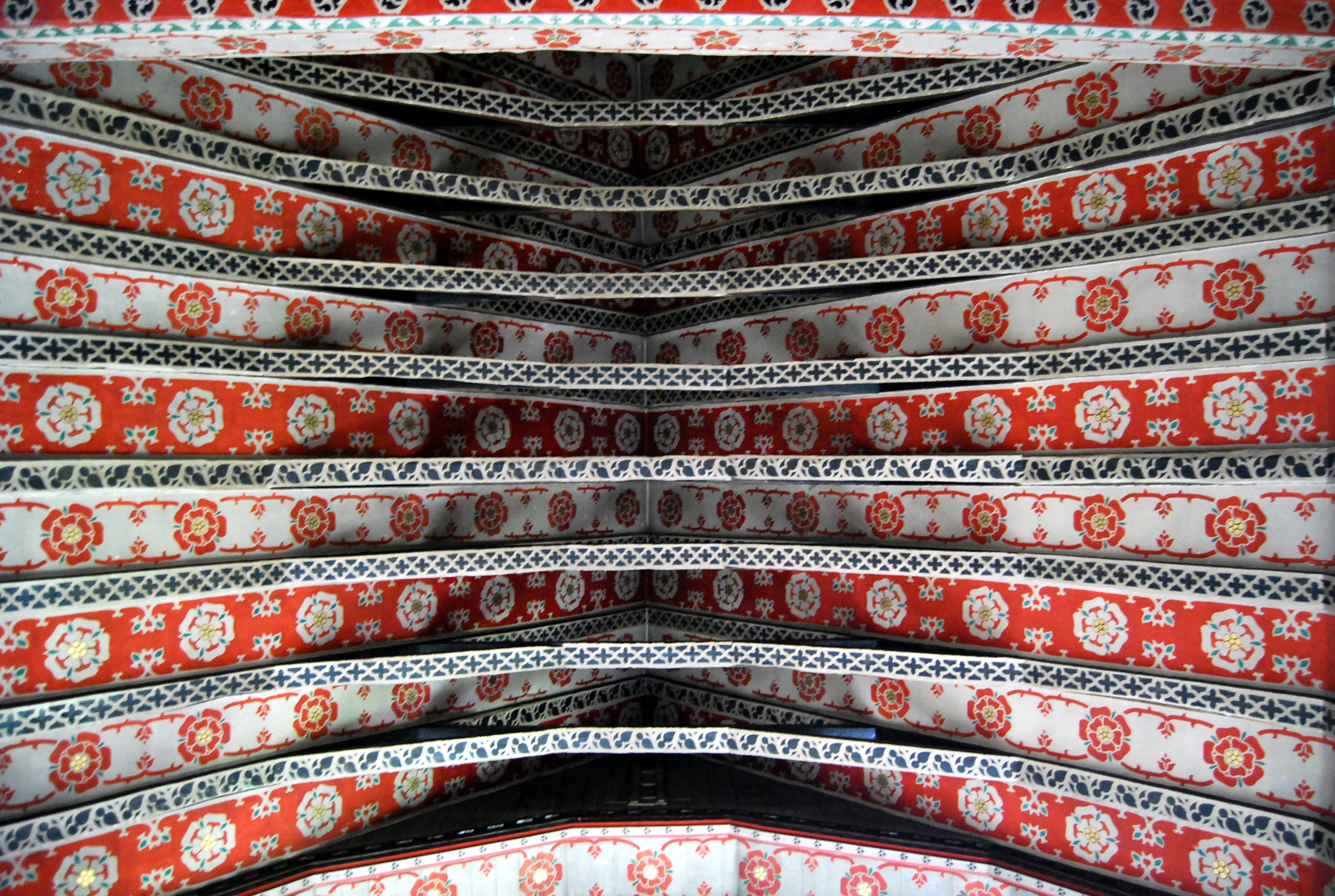
St Mary's Ceiling Detail

== History ==
The village name is Anglo-Saxon in origin, and means 'crooked or irregularly-shaped hill'. It was recorded in the Domesday Book of 1086 as Hanbledene, though previously in 1015 it was known as Hamelan dene. St Thomas Cantilupe, the Lord Chancellor and Bishop of Hereford, was born in Hambleden in 1218. In 1315 a Royal charter was granted to hold a market in the village, and a fair on St Bartholomew's Day (24 August) every year. The charter was reconfirmed in 1321, though appears to have not lasted much longer than this.

The village was a base for US soldiers during the buildup to D-Day in 1944.

=== Parish ===
Hambleden was a large ancient parish, covering the area of the modern civil parish except for the village of Fingest. It extended over 6,598 acres (2,670 ha), stretching to Skirmett, 3 miles (4.8 km) north of the village of Hambleden, and Frieth 3 miles (4.8 km) north-east of the village. The ancient parish became a civil parish in 1866. In 1934 a small area in the north of the parish was transferred to the parish of Fingest and Lane End. In the 1980s the village of Fingest was added to the parish when the parish of Fingest and Lane End was abolished.

== Village and church ==
The brick and flint cottages in the centre of the village conform to a similar design and have dormer windows topped with red tiles. Saint Mary the Virgin's church dates from the 14th century and includes a conspicuous memorial to Cope D'Oyley (who died in 1633) and his family. The tower contains eight bells and the ceiling is quite intricately decorated in parts. The post office in the village serves also as the local shop and café.

== Manor house ==
The Elizabethan manor house opposite the church, formerly the home of Maria Carmela Viscountess Hambleden, was built in 1603 of flint and brick for Emanuel, 11th Baron Scrope, who became Earl of Sunderland. Charles I stayed there overnight in 1646 while fleeing from Oxford. The Manor House, Hambleden is also the former home of James Brudenell, 7th Earl of Cardigan who led the ill-fated Charge of the Light Brigade. Another notable (Listed Grade II*) building is Kenricks which overlooks the cricket ground and was the previous manor house and the home of Philadelphia Scrope, a cousin and Lady-in-Waiting to Queen Elizabeth I. On her death in 1627 it became The Rectory and was altered in 1724 by the Rector Rev Dr Scawen Kenrick. It ceased to be The Rectory in 1938 and was acquired by the 3rd Viscount Hambleden and renamed Kenricks.

== Yewden villa excavation ==
Yewden, an archaeological site consisting of the remains of a Roman villa, was discovered to the south of Hambleden in 1912. A contested theory was put forward by Jill Eyers from Chiltern Archaeology in 2010 that a military brothel might have formed part of the Yewden villa site, after archaeologists discovered skeletal remains of what appeared to be 97 newborn babies. The investigation features in the inaugural part of the archaeology series, Digging for Britain presented by Dr Alice Roberts. The first part of the second series promised to resolve some of the controversy.

In 2012, an alternative theory for the presence of the infant skeletons was put forward; as the skeletons showed signs of cut marks carried out using a non-serrated blade, features consistent of embryotomy procedures used to remove deceased fetuses in breech position, it was argued that the remains may indicate that obstetric surgeries were carried out at Yewden.

== Notable residents ==
Saint Thomas Cantilupe was born in the old Manor House (now Kenricks) in 1218. He became Chancellor of Oxford University, Bishop of Hereford and Lord Chancellor of England. He was canonised by Pope John XXII in 1320 and was the last Englishman to be canonised before the Reformation. Thomas D'Oylie (died 1603), physician and linguist, was the uncle of Sir Cope D'Oylie, whose memorial can be seen in the church of St. Mary the Virgin. The Hambleden Estate was held by the Scrope family from 1365 to 1627; Philadelphia Carey, Lady Scrope was a granddaughter of Mary Boleyn, the sister of Queen Anne Boleyn who was executed by Henry VIII in 1536.

Lord Cardigan, famous for his role in leading the ill-fated Charge of the Light Brigade, was born in the Manor House in 1797. The sea chest that he took to the Crimea can be seen in the church. The Estate was acquired in 1925 by Frederick Smith, 2nd Viscount Hambleden, who owned the adjoining Greenlands Estate. The Smith family sold the western part of the Estate in 2008 to the Swiss financier Urs Schwarzenbach.

Major General Miles Fitzalan-Howard, 17th Duke of Norfolk, lived in the parish until his death in 2002 and his widow Anne continued to live there. Roger Marquis, 2nd Earl of Woolton lived at Kenricks in the 1960s. Musician Jon Lord, of Deep Purple, lived at Yewden Lodge in Hambleden and is buried in Saint Mary's churchyard. Phil Vickery, London Wasps player and England 2003 World Cup Winner, lived in Hambleden

== Localities ==
=== Mill End ===
Mill End is the southern small hamlet in the civil parish on the main A4155 road between Henley-on-Thames and Marlow, by the River Thames. Mill End consists of 32 houses, some on the river bank and others on the northern side of the main road. The largest historic home is at the heart of its cluster of buildings, Yewden Manor, listed grade II for architecture.

The name clearly comes from the mill that is situated near the lock, on the fast-flowing, narrow, high-sided Hambleden Bourne, which discharges here. Mill End Farm, which has been run by the Bowden family since at least 1965, is opposite the lock and has farmed most of the land in and around the southern Hambleden area. This part of the Thames is characterised by willow trees and a large biodiversity of wildlife including mute swans, great crested grebes, ducks, grey herons, common terns and kingfishers. The footpath next to Hambleden Lock, the public towpath, provides a significant amenity to Mill End.

Anne Petrie, daughter of the famous Egyptian archaeologist Flinders Petrie lived in Mill End; she is buried in Hambleden church-yard.

=== Landmarks ===
In the Mill End part of the village are a watermill, lock and villa. Adjacent to the converted barns and the ordinary home named Mill House, which had served for centuries as home to the moderately wealthy miller of the district, is the much larger, often-photographed Hambleden Mill, which has been converted into flats; this is downstream of a pedestrianised weir from Hambleden Lock.

The site of an unusually immediately Thameside Roman villa adjoins the east of the development.

In Ridge Wood atop the hill opposite the village is a large avenue of giant sequoia and tall pine trees.

=== Nearby by the Thames ===
Henley Management College lies 0.6 miles (0.97 km) west and is also on the Thames.

Danesfield House, a hotel and spa is 2.4 miles (3.9 km) east of the village on a hillside of the same relatively steep bank.

== In popular culture ==
Hambleden Lock is mentioned in Jerome K. Jerome's novel Three Men In A Boat.

=== Filming location ===
The village has only one shop-cum-Post Office, and other properties have facades that are more in keeping with a traditional country village. This has long made it a popular shooting location for films, including The Captive Heart (1946), The Witches (1966), Chitty Chitty Bang Bang (1968), Death on the Nile (1978),The Legacy (1979), The Black Cat (1981), Dance with a Stranger (1985), 101 Dalmatians (1996), Sleepy Hollow (1999), Into The Woods (2014) and Disenchanted (2022). It was also used in the opening scenes of the remake of The Avengers (1998). Hambleden Square is used as the backdrop for the local police station in The Sheep Detective

=== Television ===
Hambleden was used in the HBO mini-series Band of Brothers to depict Easy Company's training in England. In 1979 Hambleden church was the setting for a programme featuring Harry Secombe called Cross on the Donkey's Back. It was an Easter programme by Thames Television and also featured a group of school children from Hambleden C of E School.

The 2010 film Nanny McPhee Returns also used parts of the village in some of their scenes. The church was used in the Agatha Christie's Poirot episode Sad Cypress. In 2017, Hambleden was the location for the fictional village of Bramford in the fourth episode of series 4 of the ITV detective drama Endeavour. Hambleden played the role of Tadfield, home of the Anti-Christ and his friends, in the 2019 mini-series Good Omens.
