= Blow's Down =

Part of the Chiltern Hills, Bedfordshire

Coordinates: 51.883°N 0.502°W

- Site of Special Scientific Interest
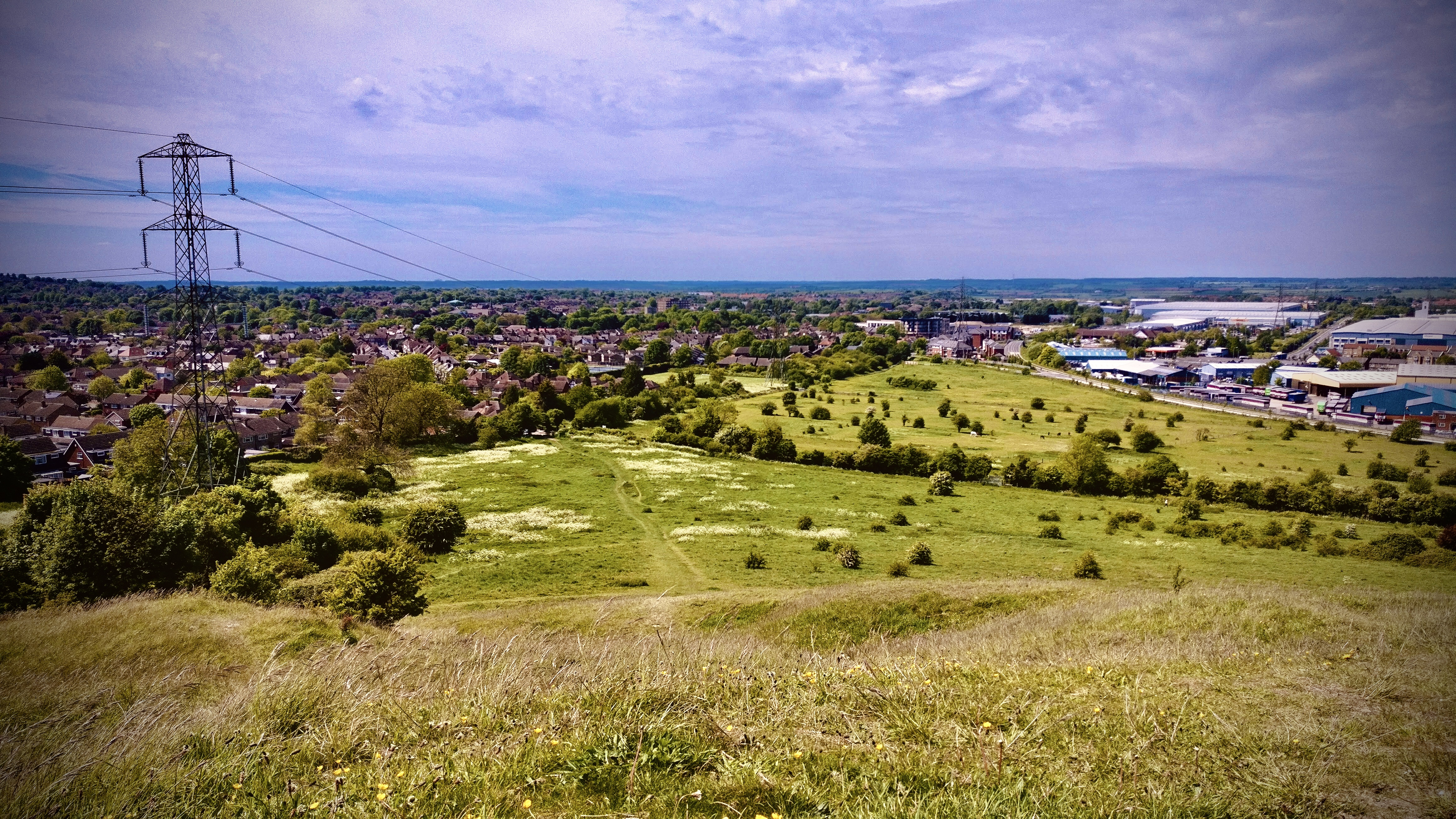
- Northwest-facing view from the viewpoint at Blow's Downs SSSI.
- Location of Blow's Down.
- Area of search: Bedfordshire
- Grid reference: TL033214
- Interest: Biological
- Area: 33.1 ha (82 acres)
- Notification date: 1989
- Location map: Magic Map

Blow's Down, also known as Blow's Downs or Blows Downs, is a chalk grassland nature reserve and biological Site of Special Scientific Interest in Dunstable in Bedfordshire, England. It forms part of the Chiltern Hills and lies close to the boundary between Dunstable and Luton, rising above the Luton Dunstable Busway.

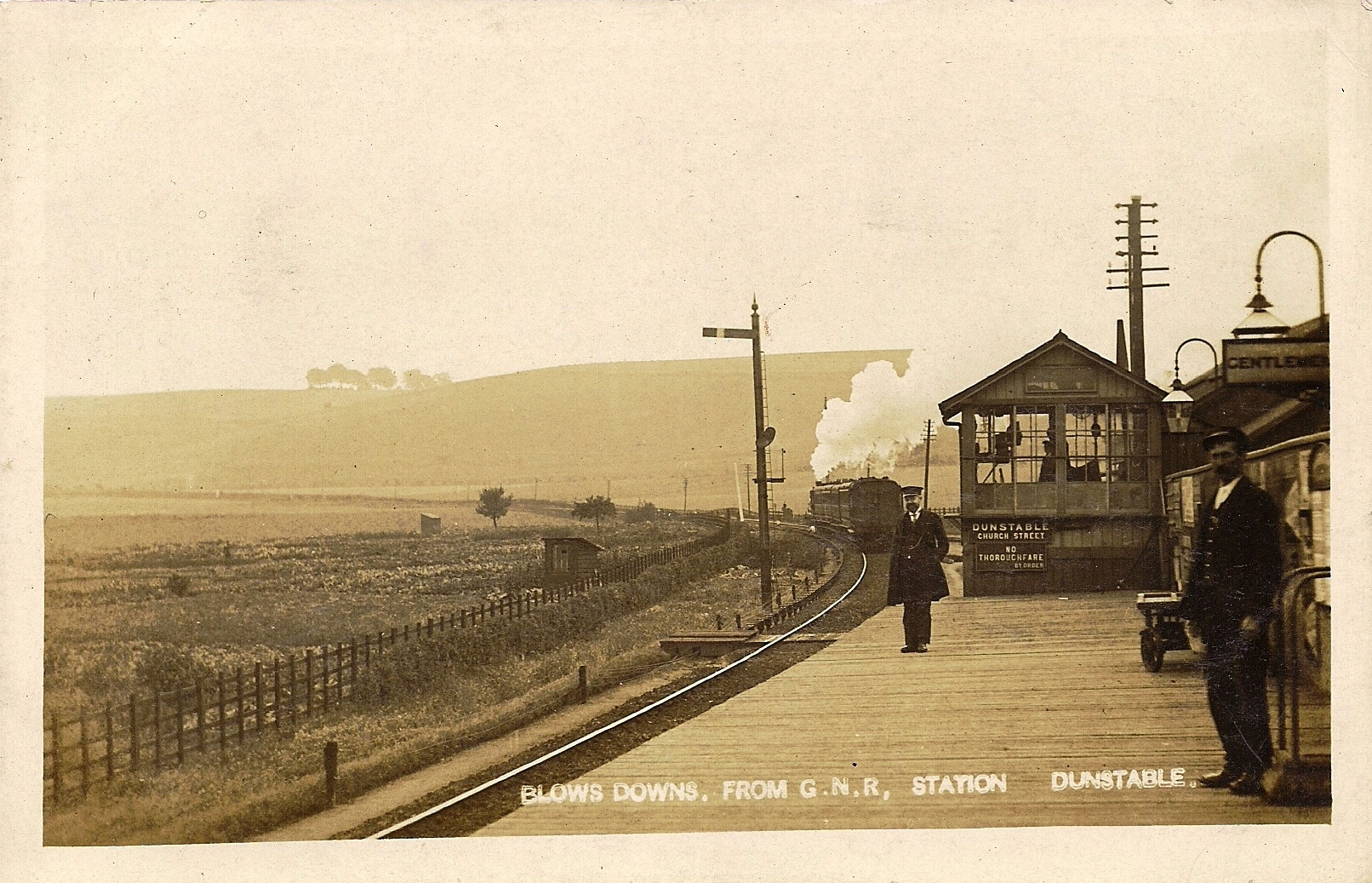
Blow's Downs from Dunstable Church Street railway station (before 1927).

The SSSI covers 33.1 hectares and was notified in 1989 under Section 28 of the Wildlife and Countryside Act 1981, and the local planning authority is Central Bedfordshire Council. The wider Blow's Downs nature reserve is managed by the Wildlife Trust for Bedfordshire, Cambridgeshire and Northamptonshire, which lists the reserve as 77 hectares. It has a maximum elevation of 212 m.

The site is noted for species-rich chalk grassland, a scarce habitat in lowland England. Its thin, nutrient poor soils support a wide range of wild flowers and insects, including orchids, scabious, knapweeds, horseshoe vetch, common rock-rose and kidney vetch. Cattle help to maintain the pasture. Features include a disused quarry and medieval cultivation terraces. A rare plant, Bunium bulbocastanum, and beetle Odontaeus armiger can be found at the site.

Dunstable is built around Blow's Down, from the south around clockwise to the east. The A5 road follows a valley between the Blow's Down and the neighbouring Dunstable Downs, which together make up part of the Chiltern Hills range.

There is access from Jeans Way in the north, from Jardine Way and Half Moon Lane in the west, and from Skimpot Road in the east.

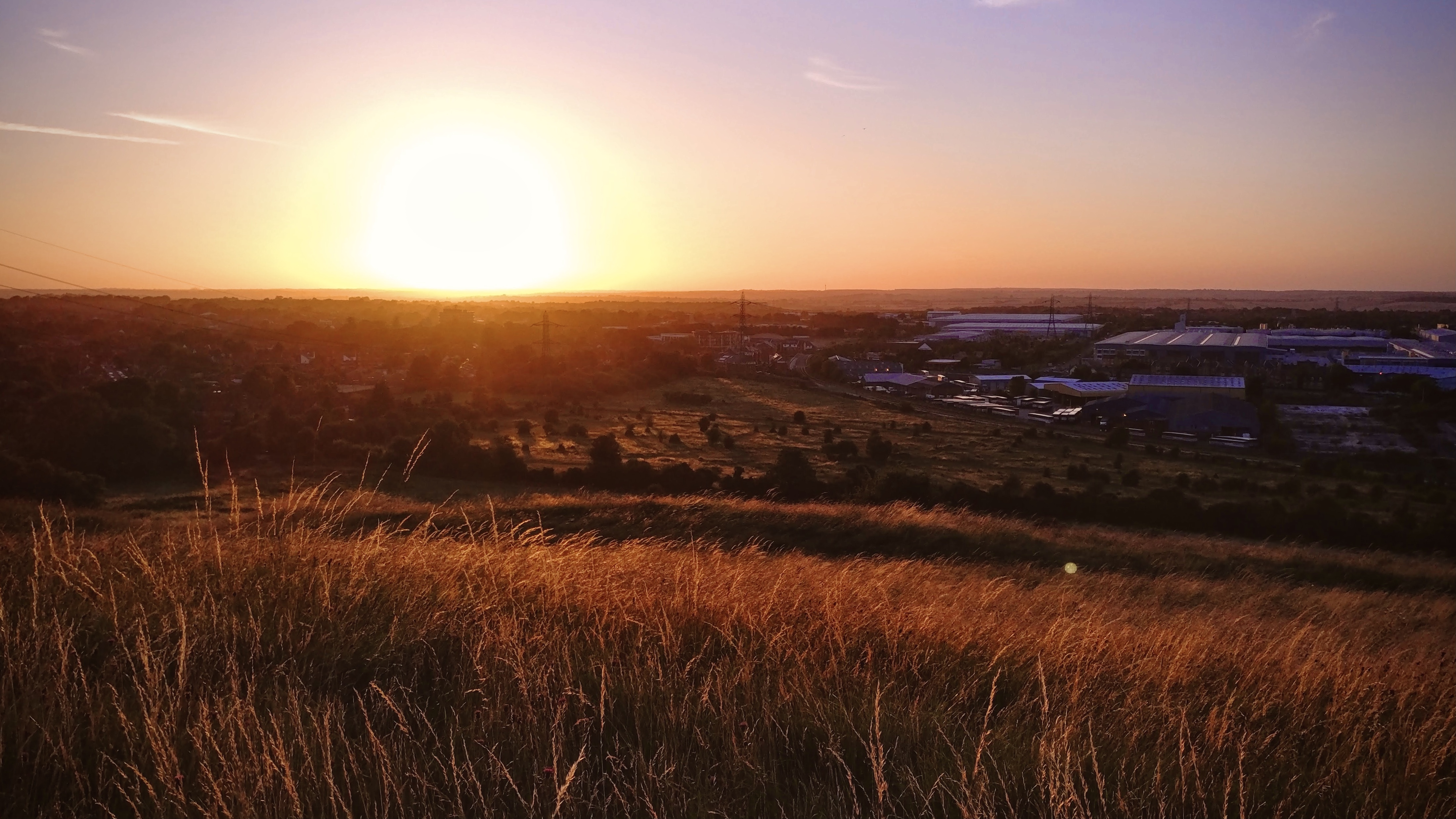
Northwest-facing view of Dunstable from the viewpoint of Blow's Downs at sunset (August 2016).

== History ==
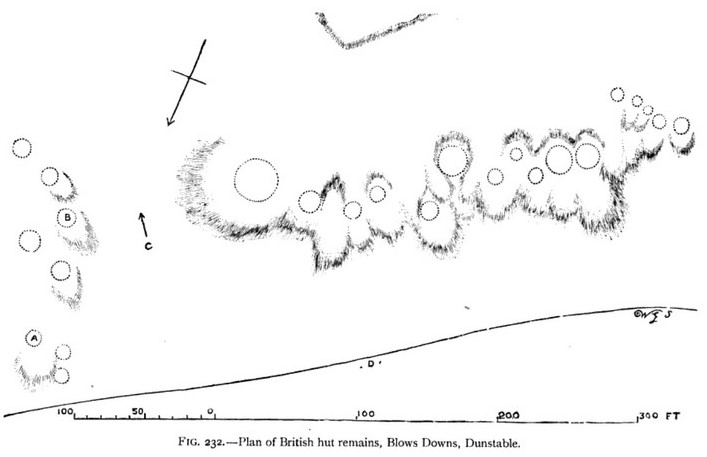
A sketch of the sites of the remains of Neolithic huts found on Blow's Down, from Worthington G. Smith's Man, the Primeval Savage.

=== Neolothic era ===
Blow's Down has a lengthy history, with evidence of human habitation dating back around 4000 years. The archeologist Worthington G. Smith identified several remains of Neolithic huts, finding among other things a horse's bone and, in 1888, part of a human skeleton.

=== Medieval period ===
Following the establishment of the town of Dunstable by Henry I, the land would likely have been rented by the king, with the slopes of the downs being mainly used for grazing as they were too steep to plough. There is however, some evidence of crops being grown, namely the existence of strip lynchets, quite visible in the area now known as Cottage Bottom fields. Blow's Down was one of relatively few places in England permitted to hold tournaments during times of calm, with a tournament being held in 1214. The fields at the foot of Blow's Down would likely have made ideal locations for such mock battles of the time.

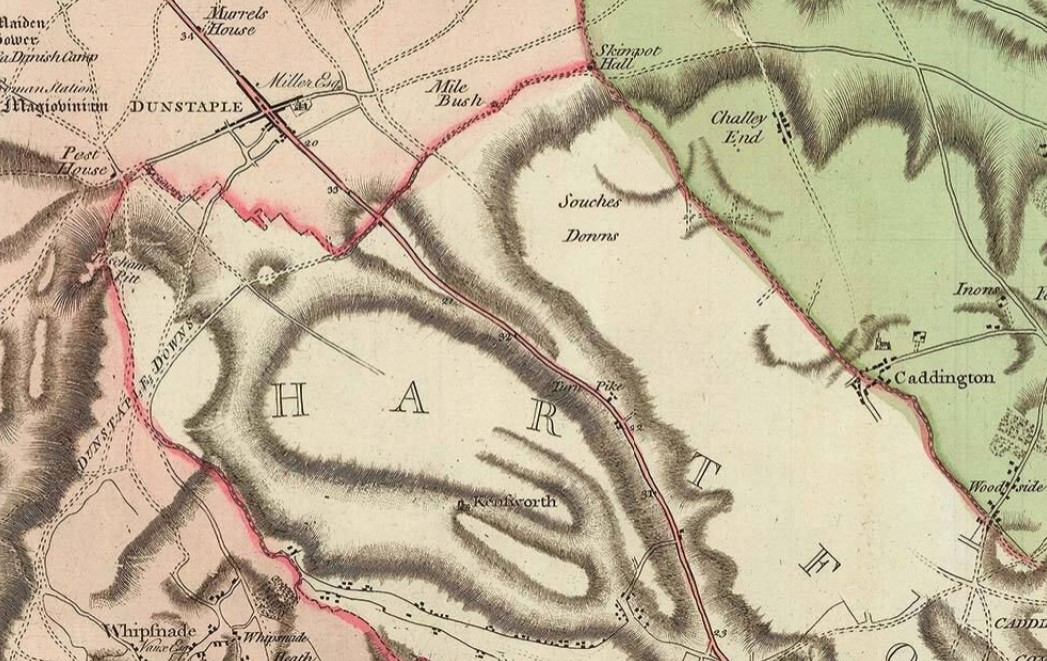
Thomas Jefferys' 1765 map of Bedfordshire, showing Dunstable as "Dunstaple" and the area now known as Blow's Down as "Souches Downs"

At the top of the downs lies Zouche's farm, which is likely to have been the site of Zouche's manor, an important estate of the family of the name la Zouche of Harringworth, who leased the land in the mid 14th century. For a while, among other names, Blow's down was eponymously referred to as Zouche's (or Souches) Downs, as seen in Jefferys' 1765 map of Bedfordshire.

=== 1800s and onwards ===
Throughout the 1800s and later, the Downs underwent several changes from human activity. The parliamentary enclosures of the early 1800s would likely have drastically changed the appearance of Blow's Downs, due to hedges planted to separate fields. Around this time is when the Downs became known by the name they are known today, probably named after tenant farmers at Zouche's farm with the surname "Blow".

In the early 20th century, commercial chalk extraction brought further, large changes to Blow's Downs. There is evidence of a limeworks on the Downs by 1901. The Luton-Dunstable rail link, which opened in 1858, provided transportation of lime away from Blow's Down. The British Portland Cement Manufacturing Company acquired the lease to the site, and were still running the works during the 1920s. Production ceased some time before the Second World War, with the chalk pit being used by the Home Guard as a training area.
