= Zouches Farm transmitting station =

Radio tower in Bedfordshire, England

Zouches Farm
- Location within Bedfordshire
- Location: Caddington, Bedfordshire
- Tower height: 68.9 m (226 ft)
- Coordinates: 51.87779°N 0.48334°W
- Grid reference: TL045210
- Built: 1940s

Zouches Farm transmitting station is a microwave radio link site located near the top of Blows Downs at Zouches Farm, Caddington, Bedfordshire, England (grid reference TL045210). It was part of the London to Birmingham chain designed in the 1940s, and is now owned and maintained by BT Group.

In September 1970, short segments of the BBC Television series Doctor Who were filmed at the relay station, for a serial entitled Terror of the Autons.

The 68.9 m (226 ft) tall radio tower is also used for digital and analogue radio broadcasts; these are maintained by Arqiva.

== Transmitted services ==
=== Analogue radio ===
Frequency	kW	Service
97.6 MHz	1	Heart East
103.8 MHz	0.5	BBC Three Counties Radio

=== Digital radio ===
Frequency	Block	kW	Operator
215.072 MHz	10D	—	NOW Home Counties†
218.640 MHz	11B	0.45	DRG London
222.064 MHz	11D	3.2	Digital One
223.936 MHz	12A	0.35	Switch London
225.648 MHz	12B	3.2	BBC National DAB
227.360 MHz	12C	0.5	CE London

† Awarded by not yet launched.
