= Fingest =

Village in Buckinghamshire, England

Coordinates: 51.614232°N 0.876955°W

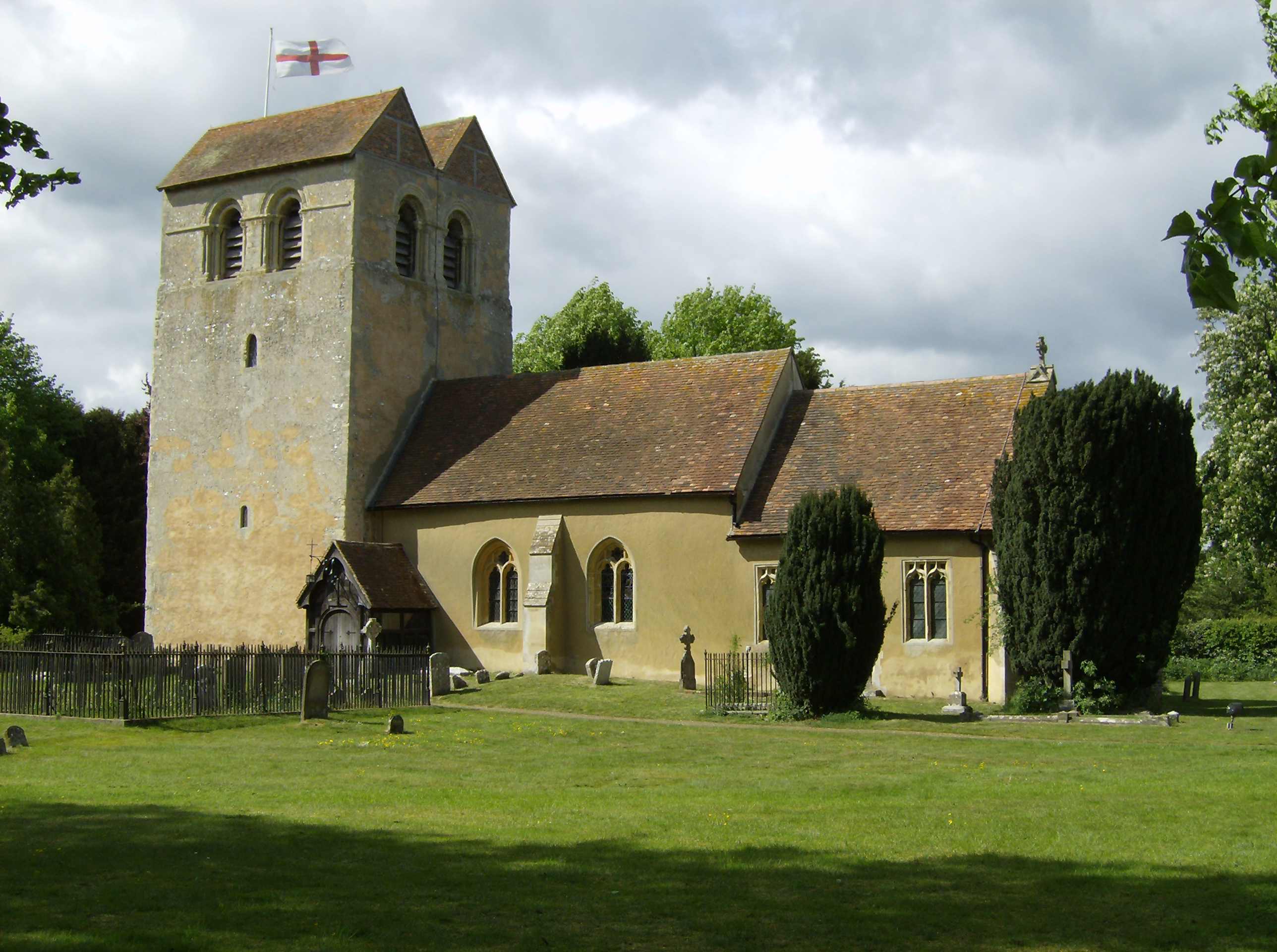
- St Bartholomew's Church Fingest

- Location within Buckinghamshire
- OS grid reference: SU777912
- Civil parish: Hambleden
- Unitary authority: Buckinghamshire
- Ceremonial county: Buckinghamshire
- Region: South East
- Country: England
- Sovereign state: United Kingdom
- Post town: HENLEY-ON-THAMES
- Postcode district: RG9
- Dialling code: 01491
- Police: Thames Valley
- Fire: Buckinghamshire
- Ambulance: South Central
- UK Parliament: Wycombe

Fingest is a village in Buckinghamshire, England. It is in the Chiltern Hills near the border with Oxfordshire. It is about six miles WSW of High Wycombe. It lies in the civil parish of Hambleden.

The parish church of St Bartholomew's dates from the early Norman period. It has an unusual tower, with a double vaulted roof. The church is a Grade I listed building.

== Name ==
=== Name history ===
- Tinghurst, Tynhurst (11-13th cent.)
- Tyngehurst (14th cent.)
- Tingerst alias Fyngerst or Fingest (16-18th cent.)

=== Toponym ===
- The wood or wooded hill where the assembly meet (Note: Fingest - ” The wood or wooded hill where the assembly meet ”: Old Norse Þing : ” assembly ”; Old English hyrst : ” wood or wooded hill ”)

Fingest : ( Ting..hurst, Tyn..hurst ) 11-13th cent.

The name is a hybrid of Old Norse and Old English.

The first element ' ting ' or ' tyn ' is from Old Norse Þing - ( ' thing' ) ( ” assembly place ” ). (Note: Old Norse Þing : ” assembly place ”) (Note: Old Norse Þing is pronounced ” thing ” , see Thing, British Isles) (Note: People of Celtic origin found the ' Þ ' of the Old Norse language ( pronounced ” Th ” ) difficult, hence words that began ' Th ' were often shortened to begin with just ' T ' , ' H ' or ' F ' ( E.g. Number three - ” tree ” )) (Note: Examples of place names derived from Old Norse Þing - ( ” thing ” ) : Tingwall, Shetland; Tynwald, Isle of Man; Thynghowe, Sherwood Forest, Nottinghamshire)

The next element ” hurst ” is from Old English ” hyrst ” ( ” wood or wooded hill ” ). (Note: Old English hyrst : ” hillock, eminence, height, wood, wooded eminence ”)

== History ==
The ancient parish of Fingest included Cadmore End to the north of the village, which became a separate ecclesiastical parish in 1852.

The manor of Fingest anciently belonged to St Albans Abbey. In 1163 it was given to the bishop of Lincoln. The ghost of Henry Burghersh, 14th-century Bishop of Lincoln, is reputed to haunt the area. After this time it was used as the country residence for the Lincoln diocese until 1547 when it was seized by the Crown. It was then given two years later to the Duke of Somerset who exchanged it with a property belonging to Wells Cathedral. The manor is now privately owned.

The civil parish of Fingest, originally based on the ecclesiastical parish, was enlarged in 1934 by adding land from the parishes of West Wycombe, Great Marlow and Hambleden. As a result, Lane End became the largest settlement in the parish, and the parish was renamed Fingest and Lane End in 1937. In the 1980s the civil parish was abolished. The larger part became the parish of Lane End, and the village of Fingest was added to Hambleden parish.

Scenes of the period drama The Monuments Men were shot in Fingest in May 2013.

== Sources ==
=== Online ===
- "Parishes: Fingest', in A History of the County of Buckingham: Volume 3,". British History Online.

=== Books ===
- Arthur, Ross G. (2002). English-Old Norse Dictionary pdf. In Parentheses Publications.
- Reaney, P H (1969). The Origin of English Place Names. Routledge & Kegan Paul.
- Page, William (1925). Parishes: Fingest', in A History of the County of Buckingham: Volume 3,. British History Online.
- Clark Hall, John R. (1916). A Concise Anglo−Saxon Dictionary, Second Edition. The Macmillan Company.
