= Fetotomy =

Veterinary operation that dissects a deceased fetus for delivery

Fetotomy is a veterinary procedure to recover a deceased fetus in situations where a Caesarean section is not possible.

== Procedure ==
In some occasions the fetus may die or be dead before the birthing process is finished. It may not always be feasible or possible to transport the animal to a veterinarian with suitable facilities for a Caesarean section. In such cases, a fetotomy may be performed.

During a fetotomy, the veterinarian will dissect the deceased fetus in a way to minimize trauma and discomfort to the mother. The procedure is generally only indicated on larger animals where the size of the birth canal allows the use of specialized instruments to assist in the removal of the dissected fetus.
