= Listed buildings in Luton =

There are over 100 listed buildings in Luton, a large town in Bedfordshire, England. A listed building is one considered to be of special architectural, historical or cultural significance, and has been placed on the statutory list maintained by Historic England, to protect it from being demolished, extended, or altered without special permission from the local planning authority. There are around 400,000 listed buildings in England overall.

Clicking on the entry number for each will show the full listing description from Historic England.

== Buildings ==
Name	Grade	Location	Type	Completed (Note: The date given is the date used by Historic England as significant for the initial building or that of an important part in the structure's description.)	Date designated	Grid ref. (Note: The grid reference is based on the British national grid reference system, sometimes known as OSGB36, used by the Ordnance Survey.) Geo-coordinates	Entry number (Note: The "List Entry Number" is a unique number assigned to each listed building and scheduled monument by Historic England.)	Image	Wikidata
61, Bute Street	II	South	House	c. 1860	20 February 1981	TL0921921462	1321364	61, Bute Street	Q26607276
64, Bute Street	II	South	House	1889	20 February 1981	TL0925321468	1114607	64, Bute Street	Q26408392
66 and 68, Bute Street	II	South	House	c. 1870	20 February 1981	TL0925821474	1321365	Upload Photo	Q26607277
111, Butterfield Green Road	II	Stopsley	House	17th century	20 February 1981	TL1067024496	1114609	Upload Photo	Q26408394
2-8, Castle Street	II	South	House	mid 19th century	20 February 1981	TL0920921083	1114613	Upload Photo	Q26408398
5, Castle Street	II	South	House	c. 1870	20 February 1981	TL0923821085	1114611	Upload Photo	Q26408396
53, Cheapside	II	South	House	1882	20 February 1981	TL0925821396	1321366	Upload Photo	Q26607278
45-55, Dumfries Street	II	South	House	mid 19th century	20 February 1981	TL0883220923	1114616	Upload Photo	Q26408400
127 Dunstable Road	II	Biscot	House	1938	11 March 1999	TL0837521733	1356878	Upload Photo	Q26639496
24, East Street	II	Lilley	House	17th century	24 October 1988	TL1186926596	1174581	Upload Photo	Q26469252
21, George Street	II	South	House	mid 19th century	20 February 1981	TL0920221131	1321369	Upload Photo	Q26607280
32, George Street	II	South	House	late 19th century	20 February 1981	TL0918221201	1321370	32, George Street	Q26607281
63, George Street	II	South	House	late 19th century	20 February 1981	TL0906521227	1114619	Upload Photo	Q26408403
1, George Street West	II	South	House	mid 19th century	20 February 1981	TL0909521156	1114620	Upload Photo	Q26408404
3, George Street West	II	South	House	c. 1860	20 February 1981	TL0908721140	1114621	3, George Street West	Q26408405
6, George Street West	II	South	House	early 19th century	20 February 1981	TL0905121126	1114624	Upload Photo	Q26408408
7 and 9, George Street West	II	South	House	late 19th century	20 February 1981	TL0907821124	1114622	Upload Photo	Q26408406
8 and 10, George Street West	II	South	House	mid 19th century	20 February 1981	TL0903421091	1311808	Upload Photo	Q26598316
9A, George Street West	II	South	House	late 19th century	20 February 1981	TL0906921108	1146428	9A, George Street West	Q26493453
11, George Street West	II	South	House	late 19th century	20 February 1981	TL0905921089	1321372	11, George Street West	Q26607283
13, 15 and 17, George Street West	II	South	House	mid 19th century	20 February 1981	TL0905421082	1114623	13, 15 and 17, George Street West	Q26408407
19, George Street West	II	South	House	late 19th century	20 February 1981	TL0904721068	1146440	19, George Street West	Q26493464
40, Guildford Street	II	South	House	1905	20 February 1981	TL0919221483	1321373	40, Guildford Street	Q26607284
40A, Guildford Street	II	South	House	late 19th century	20 February 1981	TL0920321475	1114625	40A, Guildford Street	Q26408409
47, Guildford Street	II	South	House	c. 1860	20 February 1981	TL0924321430	1321374	47, Guildford Street	Q26607285
50, Guildford Street	II	South	House	c. 1900	20 February 1981	TL0913421530	1311811	Upload Photo	Q26598319
70-76, Hastings Street	II	South	House	mid 19th century	20 February 1981	TL0886420880	1146474	Upload Photo	Q26493495
23-27, King Street	II	South	House	c. 1860	20 February 1981	TL0904621162	1321376	Upload Photo	Q26607287
29-37, King Street	II	South	House	c. 1860	20 February 1981	TL0903921155	1311763	Upload Photo	Q26598269
39, King Street	II	South	House	c. 1860	20 February 1981	TL0902221132	1114629	Upload Photo	Q26408413
7, New Bedford Road	II	South	House	?	20 February 1981	TL0893421502	1114631	Upload Photo	Q26408415
16, Park Street	II	South	House	c. 1740	8 January 1979	TL0934821108	1311755	Upload Photo	Q26598259
101, Park Street	II	South	House	c. 1840	2 April 1980	TL0963220907	1114634	Upload Photo	Q26408418
11 and 13, Park Street West	II	South	House	c. 1860	20 February 1981	TL0935621044	1114635	Upload Photo	Q26408419
21 and 23, Park Street West	II	South	House	c. 1860	20 February 1981	TL0935221028	1157938	Upload Photo	Q26451678
27 and 29, Park Street West	II	South	House	c. 1860	20 February 1981	TL0933621005	1321377	Upload Photo	Q26607288
79-80, The Green	II	Cockernhoe, Offley	House	17th century	24 October 1988	TL1276023632	1103204	79-80, The Green	Q26397267
93, Wellington Street	II	South	House	late 19th century	20 February 1981	TL0885821002	1321342	Upload Photo	Q26607259
41 42 44 45, West Street	II	Lilley	House	17th century	24 October 1988	TL1183426444	1347079	Upload Photo	Q26630558
55, West Street	II	Lilley	House	late 15th century	20 February 1981	TL1196826220	1103201	Upload Photo	Q26397263
Bailey Hill Water Tower	II	South	Water tower		20 February 1981	TL0920120067	1321343	Bailey Hill Water Tower More images	Q26607260
Baptist Union Church	II	South	Church		10 September 1954	TL0920220891	1114612	Baptist Union Church	Q26408397
Barn at Entrance to Mangrove Hall Farm	II	Mangrove Green, Offley	Outbuilding		24 October 1988	TL1238924070	1103215	Upload Photo	Q26397279
Bury Park United Reformed Church, Luton	II	Biscot	Church		20 February 1981	TL0839821896	1114638	Bury Park United Reformed Church, Luton More images	Q26408422
Caddington War Memorial	II	Caddington	Monument		18 October 2016	TL0648019874	1438671	Upload Photo	Q66478009
Cassels Cottage	II	Cockernhoe, Offley	Cottage		14 January 1977	TL1245223555	1175118	Upload Photo	Q26469765
Central Block of St Marys Hospital	II	Dallow	Hospital		20 February 1981	TL0859821435	1114617	Upload Photo	Q26408401
Ceylon Baptist Church and Hall	II	South	Church		31 January 1980	TL0890821059	1114641	Ceylon Baptist Church and Hall More images	Q26408425
Chaul End Farmhouse	II	Chaul End, Caddington	Farmhouse		26 September 1980	TL0558221597	1321350	Upload Photo	Q26607265
Chiltern Green Farmhouse	II	Chiltern Green, Hyde	Farmhouse		26 September 1980	TL1357219425	1114711	Upload Photo	Q26408491
Christ Church	II	South	Church		20 February 1981	TL0879621333	1114637	Upload Photo	Q26408421
Church Cottage	II	Lilley	House		24 October 1988	TL1183626417	1103203	Upload Photo	Q26397265
Church Farmhouse	II	Lilley	Church		24 October 1988	TL1188826401	1103200	Upload Photo	Q26397262
Church of All Saints	II*	Caddington	Church		3 February 1967	TL0639819847	1321349	Church of All Saints More images	Q17551321
Church of St Andrew with attached walls to south east	II	Biscot	Church		19 March 1981	TL0828222752	1200358	Upload Photo	Q26496163
Church of St Christopher	II	Round Green	Church		27 August 1998	TL1004322744	1376192	Church of St Christopher More images	Q26656822
Church of St Luke	II	Leagrave	Church		25 September 1998	TL0565623705	1376618	Church of St Luke More images	Q26657156
Church of St Matthew	II	High Town	Church		20 February 1981	TL0938021979	1114643	Church of St Matthew More images	Q26408427
Church of St Peter	II*	Lilley	Church		27 May 1968	TL1183226370	1174639	Church of St Peter More images	Q17554859
Copperhill	II	Lilley	House		24 October 1988	TL1186226619	1103236	Upload Photo	Q26397300
Crouchmoor Farmhouse	II	Tea Green, Offley	Farmhouse		24 October 1988	TL1349122864	1347106	Upload Photo	Q26630580
Dog Kennel Farmhouse	II	Lilley Bottom	Farmhouse		24 October 1988	TL1216125905	1103212	Upload Photo	Q26397276
Dovecote at Home Farm to south of house	II	Offley	House		24 October 1988	TL1178224398	1103177	Upload Photo	Q26397239
Ebenezer Chapel	II	South	Church		20 February 1981	TL0887020909	1114626	Upload Photo	Q26408410
Entrance Gate and Outbuildings to Wardown Park House	II	Wardown Park, High Town	Outbuilding		20 February 1981	TL0894123014	1114639	Upload Photo	Q26408423
Former Chapel Langley School	II	Farley	Church		20 February 1981	TL0889920715	1114636	Former Chapel Langley School	Q26408420
Former Stables, walls of adjoining Walled Garden and Vaulted Alcove at Putteridge Bury	II	Putteridge Bury Estate, Putteridge	Outbuilding		24 October 1988	TL1182224772	1103207	Upload Photo	Q26397270
Garden Houses and retaining walls to terraced gardens at Luton Hoo	I	Luton Hoo Estate, Hyde	Outbuilding		26 September 1980	TL1047618446	1158944	Upload Photo	Q17528320
Gas Lamps outside numbers 10 and 32 Hart Hill Drive	II	Hart Hill, High Town	Lampposts		23 March 2011	TL0991621489	1116880	Gas Lamps outside numbers 10 and 32 Hart Hill Drive	Q26410458
Gates, Dwarf Wall and Railings to High Town Methodist Church	II	High Town	Wall/railing		20 February 1981	TL0936621833	1146501	Gates, Dwarf Wall and Railings to High Town Methodist Church	Q26493519
George II Public House	II	South	Pub		20 February 1981	TL0927221478	1114608	George II Public House More images	Q26408393
Glasshouses at Stockwood Park	II	Farley			1 September 2020		1468978	Glasshouses at Stockwood Park More images	Q98931429
Great Northern Public House	II	South	Pub		20 February 1981	TL0922421472	1114606	Great Northern Public House More images	Q26408391
Hart Lane Water Tower	II	Hart Hill, Crawley	Water tower		20 February 1981	TL1005422080	1146452	Hart Lane Water Tower	Q26493474
High Town Methodist Church	II	High Town	Church		20 February 1981	TL0935421844	1114627	High Town Methodist Church More images	Q26408411
High Town Methodist Church Hall	II	High Town	Church		20 February 1981	TL0936521857	1114628	High Town Methodist Church Hall	Q26408412
Holy Trinity Church	II	Limbury	Church		27 August 1998	TL0759823855	1376191	Holy Trinity Church More images	Q26656821
Home Farm No. 1, 2, 3, 4 and Outhouses linked to the North	II	Offley	Farmhouse		24 October 1988	TL1174624452	1103176	Upload Photo	Q26397238
Horseshoe Cottage	II	Lilley	Cottage		24 October 1988	TL1192526302	1347078	Upload Photo	Q26630557
Laburnam Cottage	II	Lilley	Cottage		20 August 1975	TL1172226582	1103199	Upload Photo	Q26397261
Laburnum Farmhouse	II	Hyde	Farmhouse		26 September 1980	TL1355319206	1321300	Upload Photo	Q26607221
Lilley Arms Public House	II	Lilley	Pub		24 October 1988	TL1179026483	1103202	Lilley Arms Public House More images	Q26397264
Little Bramingham Farmhouse	II	Bramingham	Farmhouse		16 May 1978	TL0727925460	1114605	Upload Photo	Q26408390
Lodge to Wardown Park	II	Wardown Park, High Town	Outbuilding		20 February 1981	TL0875822912	1157879	Upload Photo	Q26451620
Luton Hoo	I	Luton Hoo Estate, Hyde	Mansion		29 April 1952	TL1045118552	1321301	Luton Hoo More images	Q3267914
Luton Hoo Garden Centre	II	Luton Hoo Estate, Hyde	Outbuilding		26 October 1980	TL1029117935	1159027	Upload Photo	Q26452759
Luton Hoo Stables, including frontage range and rear courtyard buildings, incorporating Stable Master's house	II*	Luton Hoo Estate, Hyde	Outbuilding		3 February 1967	TL1046018212	1114713	Upload Photo	Q17551105
Luton Town Hall	II	South	Town hall		27 August 1998	TL0900621329	1376193	Luton Town Hall More images	Q6705894
Mangrove Hall and Attached Outhouses	II	Mangrove Green, Offley	Outbuilding		24 October 1988	TL1240724095	1175103	Upload Photo	Q26469748
Moat House	II	Saints	House		10 September 1954	TL0780624022	1311772	Upload Photo	Q26598279
Monument In St Peter's Churchyard (8m to south of Church Tower)	II	Lilley	Monument		24 October 1988	TL1182126344	1347080	Upload Photo	Q26630559
Monument In St Peter's Churchyard (9m to south of Church Tower)	II	Lilley	Monument		24 October 1988	TL1182226342	1174690	Upload Photo	Q26469357
Office Block, Vauxhall Motors	II	Crawley	Office block		26 July 1989	TL1067520657	1249000	Upload Photo	Q26541173
Old Post Office Cottages	II	Lilley	Cottage		24 October 1988	TL1182526692	1174574	Upload Photo	Q26469246
Parish Church of St Mary	I	South	Church		10 September 1954	TL0953221204	1114615	Parish Church of St Mary More images	Q7594376
Putteridge Bury (Luton College of Higher Education)	II	Putteridge Bury Estate, Putteridge	Mansion		24 October 1988	TL1196424780	1347083	Putteridge Bury (Luton College of Higher Education) More images	Q7262469
Quadrant Walls, Curtain Walls and Gate Piers to Wardown Park Lodge	II	Wardown Park, High Town	Wall/railing		20 February 1981	TL0875722889	1114632	Upload Photo	Q26408416
Railings at Number 3	II	South	Wall/railing		20 February 1981	TL0907921141	1321371	Upload Photo	Q26607282
Railings Fronting Ceylon Baptist Church	II	South	Wall/railing		31 January 1980	TL0888521070	1321341	Upload Photo	Q26607258
Railings Fronting Hall of Ceylon Baptist Church	II	South	Wall/railing		31 January 1980	TL0890521044	1114642	Upload Photo	Q26408426
Railings to front and side of Ebenezer Chapel	II	South	Wall/railing		20 February 1981	TL0888420912	1321375	Upload Photo	Q26607286
Red Lion Hotel	II	South	Hotel		20 February 1981	TL0921621086	1138335	Red Lion Hotel More images	Q26431530
South and east Ranges of Farm Buildings at Home Farm	II	Offley	Outbuilding		24 October 1988	TL1179524464	1103178	Upload Photo	Q26397240
St Hughs Cottage	II	Cockernhoe, Offley	Cottage		24 October 1988	TL1260223554	1174701	St Hughs Cottage	Q26469368
Stockwood Park House Stable Block	II	Farley	Outbuilding		29 October 1974	TL0855119663	1321378	Stockwood Park House Stable Block More images	Q26607289
Stone Tank in front of south Front at Putteridge Bury	II	Putteridge Bury Estate, Putteridge	Outbuilding		24 October 1988	TL1197924734	1174763	Upload Photo	Q26469429
Summerhouse at Wardown Park	II	Wardown Park, High Town	Outbuilding		20 February 1981	TL0900122954	1321340	Upload Photo	Q26607257
The Brewery Tap Public House, The Pioneer Bookshop	II	South	Pub		8 January 1979	TL0937721092	1114633	The Brewery Tap Public House, The Pioneer Bookshop More images	Q26408417
The Cock Public House	II	South	Pub		8 January 1979	TL0941321067	1157932	Upload Photo	Q26451672
The Fountain Public House	II	Farley	Pub		20 February 1981	TL0878520856	1114640	Upload Photo	Q26408424
The Griffin Public House	II	South	Pub		20 February 1981	TL0916321089	1114614	Upload Photo	Q26408399
The Nickel Bag Public House	II	South	Pub		20 February 1981	TL0924321094	1114618	The Nickel Bag Public House More images	Q26408402
The Painters Arms	II	High Town	Pub		30 October 1998	TL0944121931	1386059	The Painters Arms More images	Q18161081
The White Hart Public House	II	South	Pub		20 February 1981	TL0927621122	1114610	The White Hart Public House	Q26408395
Wandon End Farmhouse	II	Wandon End, King's Walden	Farmhouse		8 February 1988	TL1331822443	1102448	Upload Photo	Q26396515
Wandon End House	II	Wandon End, King's Walden	House		8 February 1988	TL1354822416	1307874	Upload Photo	Q26594523
War Memorial	II	South	Monument		9 March 1982	TL0902221314	1114644	War Memorial More images	Q26408428
Wardown Park House	II	Wardown Park, High Town	Mansion		20 February 1981	TL0892722970	1321379	Wardown Park House More images	Q7969194
Whitehill	II	South	House		15 October 1997	TL0896620404	1114630	Upload Photo	Q26408414
Wigmore Hall Farmhouse	II	Wigmore	Farmhouse		20 February 1981	TL1249922250	1321368	Upload Photo	Q26607279
Winchhill Farmhouse	II	Winch Hill, King's Walden	Farmhouse		8 February 1988	TL1375521839	1307881	Upload Photo	Q26594530

== See also ==
- List of churches in Luton
- Buildings and structures in Luton
