= High Town, Luton =

Area of Luton, England

Coordinates: 51.887473°N 0.413188°W

High Town
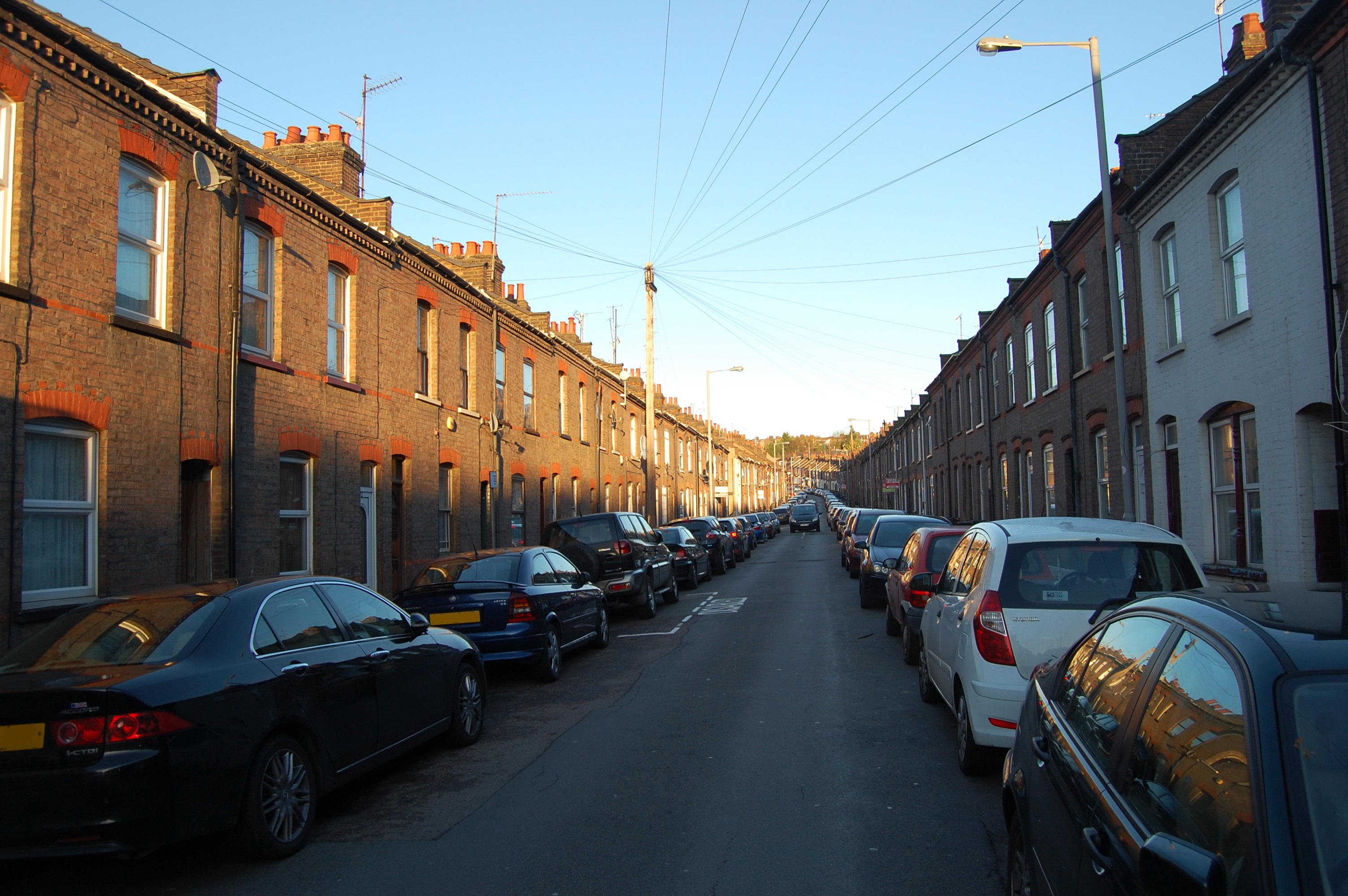
- Ridgway Road, High Town

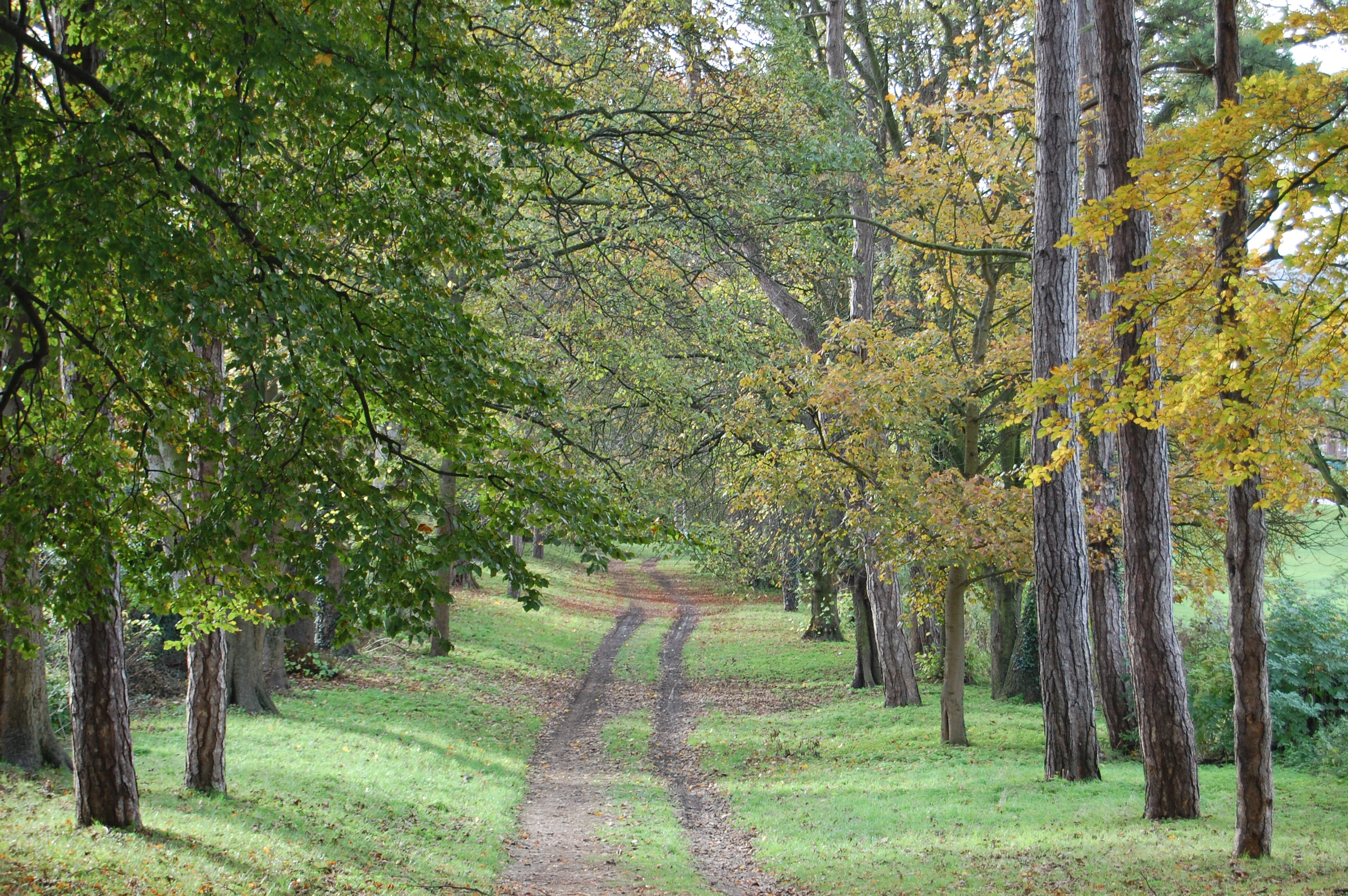
- Pope's Meadow, High Town

- Location within Bedfordshire
- Population: 9,046
- OS grid reference: TL 09305 22180
- Unitary authority: Luton
- Ceremonial county: Bedfordshire
- Region: East
- Country: England
- Sovereign state: United Kingdom
- Post town: LUTON
- Postcode district: LU2
- Dialling code: 01582
- Police: Bedfordshire
- Fire: Bedfordshire
- Ambulance: East of England
- UK Parliament: Luton South

High Town is an inner area of Luton immediately north of Luton railway station, and a ward of the Borough of Luton, in the ceremonial county of Bedfordshire, England.

The area and ward are officially spelled as two separate words. This is also the most common spelling of the name, but some organisations and businesses use 'Hightown', e.g. Hightown Baptist Church and Hightown Community, Sports & Arts Centre.

== History ==
Around 1841, landowner Frederick Burr began to sell off fields in High Town for development. Burr Street and Duke Street were two of the earliest side streets leading off High Town Road. Added impetus for development came with the railway. The Hertford, Luton and Dunstable Railway arrived from Dunstable at Luton′s first railway station in Bute Street in 1858. Two years later saw the line's completion to Hatfield. Soon after, Wenlock Street, Havelock Road, Dudley Street and North Street were laid out. The latter two had a mix of small industrial units and housing. The Midland Railway arrived in 1868 and a second station was opened immediately north of the Bute Street station. The line's construction necessitated some re-routing of roads and demolition of property in High Town. Direct pedestrian access to Luton town centre from High Town Road was now via a lattice–sided footbridge.

First edition Ordnance Survey maps surveyed in 1878 show two iron foundries off Cobden Street and a dye works off York Street. St Matthew's School on Havelock Road had separate infants and boys and girls departments. The Methodist Chapel on High Town Road had an attached school for girls and infants. Next door was a cottage hospital. A water works had been built off Crescent Road. Detached residences with gardens sloping down to the River Lea had been built on Villa Road and New Bedford Road. One of the plots was for a St John′s College.

High Town Road had been developed up to and beyond Jubilee Street by 1900. A school and dye works for straw plait had been built on Old Bedford Road. Across Hitchin Road there was scattered development on Crescent Rise, Hart Hill Drive and Hart Hill Lane. The Wesleyan Central Mission was built in 1903 near the Midland Road Railway Station. It closed in 1966 and the building was demolished in 1970.

Two tramlines ran from the centre of Luton through High Town from 1908 to 1932, mostly on single track lines with passing places. One line went along New Bedford Road to Wardown Park and the other along Midland Road and High Town Road to Round Green.

A cinema called The Picturedrome and High Town Electric Theatre, opened on High Town Road in 1912. It closed in 1937 but reopened as the Plaza. The building was used as a warehouse prior to demolition in 1979.

By 1922, High Town's development was largely complete. Frederic Street, Reginald Street and Clarendon Road had been laid out towards Pope's Meadow. High Town Road had housing up to its junction with Hitchin Road and nearby Ridgway Road followed on from North Street. The Norton College building had been converted to a hat works. Other industry included a thermo-electric works on a site between York Street and Cobden Street and a cardboard box works off Clarendon Road.

== Geography ==
=== Boundary, elevation and geology ===
The High Town area is roughly bounded by Richmond Hill and the northern edge of People's Park/Pope's Meadow to the north, the Midland Main Line railway to the south, the A6, New Bedford Road to the west, and Hitchin Road to the east. The land rises south to north from a low of 112 metres (367 ft) where the Old Bedford Road meets Hucklesby Way to a high of 160 metres (520 ft) at the northern edge of People's Park. Hart Hill, which overlooks High Town from the east reaches 168 metres (551 ft). The underlying geology is a mix of two chalk formations called Holywell Nodular and New Pit.

=== Conservation area, housing and commerce ===
High Town Road from Midland Road up to Havelock Road and York Street is designated a conservation area.

A study published in 2005 described High Town, in comparison to Luton town centre, as "a quieter, older world of small shops and terraced houses, a mixed area that provided work, shelter and leisure to people engaged in the hat trade that flourished in Luton until the late thirties".

From 2008 to 2011, Luton Council spent money to renovate public spaces in the ward after many years of neglect. In 2011 Luton Council finished its largest programme for the area, which involved the refurbishment of shop fronts and re-paving of roads. Shop refurbishment was in a style "befitting the Victorian heritage of much of High Town".

Further along High Town Road beyond the conservation area and on the side streets and adjacent roads are terraces of Victorian houses, many traditionally built in Luton Grey brick. The Paths Estate, an area of 1970s local authority built flats and houses lies west of High Town Road between Wenlock Road and Mussons Path. East of High Town Road is an area of warehouses and factories, set to be redeveloped. Planning documents have named the area High Town East Village. Gillam Court, a development of low rise apartment buildings, was completed in 2017.

The ring road and railway line physically separate High Town from Luton town centre, but there is pedestrian access through the railway station to Bute Street and the Luton Mall shopping complex.

=== Parks and open spaces ===
There is effectively a 'green chain' of parks and open spaces across the top of High Town. Bells Close Recreation Ground adjoins the hilly, wooded area of People's Park, from where access can be gained to Pope's Meadow. Immediately west of Pope's Meadow across Old Bedford Road is Wardown Park.

== Government ==
High Town ward electoral district returns two councillors to Luton Borough Council. In addition to High Town, the ward boundary extends north to include Wardown Park and Wardown Crescent and east of Hitchin Road to include Crescent Road and Pomfret Avenue. Cllr Andy Malcolm (Labour) has been a High Town councillor since May 2011 and Cllr Umme Ali (Labour) was elected in May 2021.

Aysegul Gurbuz, a Labour councillor elected in High Town in May 2015, was suspended by the party in April 2016 after anti-Semitic comments were found on her Twitter account. The case came to national attention, with then Labour leader Jeremy Corbyn telling BBC One's Andrew Marr Show: "Anti-Semitism is absolutely abhorrent and wrong. Anyone that commits any act of anti-Semitism, that makes anti-Semitic remarks, is auto excluded from the party and an inquiry follows immediately". Gurbuz apologised and resigned from Labour the next day. Three years later, she wrote an article for The Independent, in which she explained that she grew up with people who normalised bigoted remarks, and that education and interaction were the keys to tackling racism.

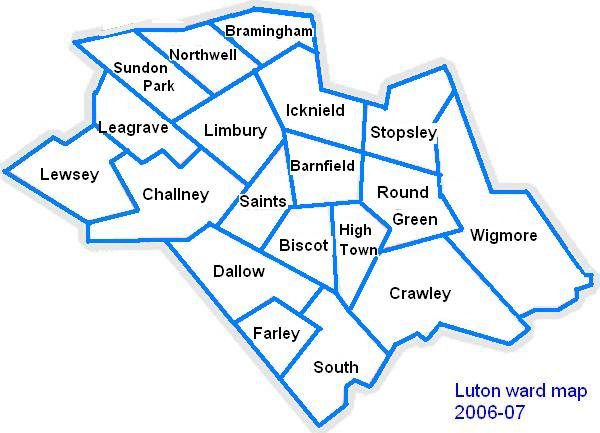
Map of Luton showing High Town

The ward forms part of the parliamentary constituency of Luton South and the MP is Rachel Hopkins (Labour), who was elected in December 2019. Hopkins remained a High Town councillor for another 17 months, until a by-election could be held to find a replacement for her in that role.

Labour's Olly Martins lived in High Town when he became the first elected Police and Crime Commissioner for Bedfordshire, which includes the Luton area. The current Bedfordshire Police and Crime Commissioner is Festus Akinbusoye.

== Demography ==
The 2011 Census recorded a population of 9,046 people living in the High Town ward, an increase of 27.8% on the 2001 Census figure. This was the second highest population increase recorded in an electoral ward in Luton between 2001 and 2011, the largest increase being in South ward.

High Town: ethnicity (2011 Census)
| Ethnic group | % High Town Ward |
| White | 61.8 |
| Mixed | 5.2 |
| Asian | 17.9 |
| Black | 12.2 |
| Other | 2.9 |

High Town: religion (2011 Census)
| Religion | % High Town Ward |
| Christian | 54 |
| Buddhist | 0.7 |
| Hindu | 3.4 |
| Jewish | 0.2 |
| Muslim | 11.5 |
| Sikh | 1.3 |
| Other religion | 0.6 |
| No religion | 21.8 |
| Religion not stated | 6.4 |

High Town has a high proportion of young adult residents, compared to the average across Luton.

== Economy ==
=== Hat industry ===
About a third of Luton's population was involved in producing hats in the industry's heyday in the 1870s, but by 1999 this had declined to about 1,000, around 0.5% of the population at that time.

However, there are still hat makers and associated trades in High Town.

- I Llewellyn & Co, Midland Road
- Olney Headwear, Old Bedford Road The firm made boater hats for various schools, including Harrow, and one of its customers was the French film star and singer Maurice Chevalier. The firm also made the peaked caps worn by the cast of the BBC TV series Peaky Blinders. The firm permanently closed on 21 December 2020.
- Ken Peirson, Old Bedford Road
- Nigel Rayment, Frederick Street.
- F Ruegger / Millinery UK, Clarendon Road
- KR Snoxell & Sons, Clarendon Road
- Walter Wright Limited, Albion Road
- Barford Brothers' dye works on North Street is the last company in the UK producing dyes for the hat trade.
- Boon & Lane Hat Blockers on Taylor Street makes wood and metal blocks for shaping hats. A Country Life article in October 2017 stated the firm was the sole British company manufacturing handmade hat blocks.
- Randall Ribbons on Frederick Street supplies hat trimmings, materials and accessories.

== Culture and community ==
=== Culture ===
==== Art ====
In 2010, two 'pop-up' (temporary) community art spaces were created in empty shops on High Town Road by Luton Borough Council, Luton Culture and community interest company Meanwhile, Space. One of the aims of the High Town Art for All project was to bring the shops back into use as retail spaces, which was successful. The scheme was awarded Best Community Project in Luton's Best 2010 Awards.

There were a further two exhibitions in these former shops. The other was opened by the cultural attaché to the German embassy in early 2011.

Shop 33 on High Town Road, which existed from 2013 to 2015, sold works by local artists and craftspeople. It was run by Luton Community Arts Trust. The Flamingo Arts group took over the premises in 2015 and ran it as an arts workshop until 2017.

==== Festivals ====
High Town used to host an annual festival that included a tug-of-war competition held between teams representing different pubs. The Friends of High Town residents' association ran a High Town Fun Day in 2010 and 2011, where it revived a tug-of-war contest. The Luton-based 33 Arts organisation ran a High Town Festival in July 2013. A coalition of local organisations and faith groups came together to organise the July 2014 High Town Festival and it has been an annual fixture since then on the first Saturday of July.

The annual Luton Beer and Cider Festival was held at two venues in High Town: The Drill Hall on Old Bedford Road until its closure, then the Hightown Community, Sports and Arts Centre until 2018 (the beer festival's 36th year) and it has not had a permanent home since.

==== Media ====
High Town Matters was an occasional newspaper, published by anti-racism organisation Hope Not Hate, and delivered free of charge to homes and meeting places in High Town.

Living Luton TV was an internet television channel for the town, based on Midland Road and run as a Community Interest Company. It existed from 2014 to 2017.

Luton at Large was a 'what's on' guide for the town published by JNB Publishing (now trading as Treacle Factory).

Tropical FM TV, which describes itself as an interactive internet-based radio station, used to operate from a building on Midland Road.

The Luton Today website covers news and sport within High Town ward.

==== Music ====
From 1998 to 2018, High Town was the home of Greenbank Music Village, a converted Wesleyan Chapel building which offered music tuition, rehearsal and recording studios, and a music shop. All of the music services that were found at the Cobden Street site are now on offer just outside High Town, from Moody's house in Round Green.

The partly High Town-based instrumental punk band The Knockouts run music label High Town Records, produce cult fanzine Clod and the Luton Haiku, a daily online ode to the town.

==== Poetry ====
Poet and musician John Hegley, who was brought up in Luton, used to spend time in the Scandinavia Café on High Town Road. He immortalised the eatery in a poem that is displayed on the home page of its website. He returned to 'the Scandi' for the High Town Arts and Crafts Fair in December 2012, where he performed and signed copies of his latest poetry collection.

Seán Ó Roideacháin's poem 'High Town Road' ('Baile Ard Luton' in Irish) is about Irish emigrants in The Painters Arms and The Freeholder pubs on High Town Road during the late 1980s.

=== Community facilities ===
==== Groups and societies ====
1st Luton Sea Scouts, Luton's only sea scout group, has its headquarters on Bowling Green Lane. The group's first meeting took place in 1909, in the bedroom of a house in Clarendon Road in High Town.

Alban Neve Deaf Association, which hosted Luton Deaf Club, was based at a purpose-built building on Old Bedford Road from 1962 until 2017. Luton Deaf Club now meets on a weekly basis, a short distance away, at Hope Church on Villa Road.

The Association of Ukrainians in Great Britain has a branch on Cromwell Hill.

The Friends of High Town residents' association meets monthly at the High Town Methodist Church.

The Lea Valley Masonic Lodge is based at The Pavilion on Bowling Green Lane.

==== Health ====
There is one GP practice in High Town, the Wenlock Surgery on Wenlock Street, and a private dental surgery, U Smile Dental Practice on Old Bedford Road.

==== Parks and open spaces ====
Bells Close Recreation Ground has a modern playground and 'trim trail', and is popular with footballers and dog walkers. People's Park is designated a County Wildlife Site, because of the occurrence of a rare plant species called the Great Pignut (Latin: Bunium persicum), which gives this piece of land limited protection from development. Pope's Meadow is an open, sloping area of grassland popular with sledgers in snowy weather. It normally hosts Luton Borough Council's annual fireworks display in November. Wardown Park could be considered Luton's main park, due its size and central location.

People's Park (incorporating Bells Close Recreation Ground and Pope's Meadow) and Wardown Park each hold a Green Flag Award, recognising them as amongst the best green spaces in the UK.

There are council-owned allotments just off Stockingstone Road, called Stockingstone Leisure Gardens. Plotholders at Stockingstone manage the day-to-day operation of the site in collaboration with Luton Borough Council.

==== Public houses and bars ====
High Town Road remains a place to experience traditional pubs. The Bricklayers Arms is a haven for Luton Town fans when their team is playing at home, but otherwise revels in a reputation for real ale and good conversation. It first appears in a register of alehouse licences in 1824. The Gardeners Call has a beer garden to the rear. It originated from a beerhouse first licensed in 1869 and has been a public house since 1956. The Painters Arms, (rebuilt 1913), has a part glazed brick exterior in various shades of green, some of which is laid in horizontal rusticated bands. The interior has several interesting surviving features, including a 'Jug Bar' in the centre. It is now an Irish pub, with Gaelic games shown on its TV screens. The Well is a double-fronted nineteenth century pub that for most of its life was called The Blockers Arms, and for a few years before its current incarnation was a bar and nightclub called Déjà Vu.

The Freeholder was a nineteenth century pub on York Street (at its junction with High Town Road), which became an Indian restaurant after owner Whitbread sold its pubs in 2001. The business reverted to its original name upon reopening as a bar in late 2012. but ceased trading in spring 2015. In 2019, the pub was converted into bed and breakfast accommodation called the Eagle Hotel, with a café where the bar used to be.

The British actress Diana Dors, an iconic figure of the 1960s, occasionally served behind the bar at a pub called The Rabbit on the corner of Old Bedford Road and North Street. It was renamed The English Rose and ceased trading in 2017.

Another pub – The Old English Gentleman – existed on the corner of Burr Street and Hitchin Road from at least 1847, and was in operation until 2010. The building was demolished in 2011 and the lot has remained vacant since. Planning permission was granted in 2020 to build a block of nineteen flats on the site.

== Transport ==
=== Buses ===
The number 14 bus travels through the centre of the ward, stopping in several places in High Town on its way between Luton town centre and the neighbouring suburb of Round Green. As such, it could be considered the main bus route through High Town. Other buses with stops in the ward include the 12, 12A, 13, 16, 17, 17A, 19, 19A, 21, 24, 25, 26, 35, 79, 81, 101, 102, 755 and 787.

=== Cycling ===
National Cycle Route 6 passes through High Town along the A6 New Bedford Road and there is a cycle route along the Old Bedford Road. Both are marked routes alternating between shared roads and pavements. The section of inner ring road from Old Bedford Road to Hitchin Road has a path alongside designated for cyclists as well as pedestrians.

=== Guided busway ===
The Luton-Dunstable Guided Busway, which was opened in September 2013, stops at Luton railway station, although not on the High Town side.

=== Rail ===
Luton railway station has an exit to Midland Road in High Town. The station typically has 10 peak trains per hour to and from St Pancras in London. Journeys take between 23 and 46 minutes, making High Town approximately one hour from the middle of the City of London. Thameslink trains run to Gatwick Airport (1 hour 22 minutes) and Brighton (just under 2 hours), as well as north to Bedford. East Midlands Railway runs 'fast' services to Bedford and on through Northamptonshire to Leicester, Loughborough, East Midlands Parkway (for East Midlands Airport), Derby and Chesterfield.

=== Road transport ===
Luton's inner ring road passes through the southern edge of High Town from New Bedford Road to Crawley Green Road. The section from Old Bedford Road eastwards, part of which runs under Luton railway station's multi-storey car park opened in August 2014, and finally completed the circular route 40 years after the first part was built. The 700 plus space multi-storey car park with its entrance and exit on Midland Road opened in 2011. It has a cladded facade with coloured LED lighting.

Junction 10a of the M1 motorway is approximately 3 miles or a 10-minute drive from the centre of High Town.

== Education ==
There is early years provision at Blooming Wild on Hitchin Road and at Hightown Pre-school in the High Town Methodist Church on High Town Road.

St Matthew's Primary School on Havelock Road is the sole primary school in High Town.

Windmill Hill School is a new build special school for secondary age pupils that opened on York Street in September 2021. There are no other secondary schools in the ward; most of the area falls into the catchment area for Stopsley High School.

The University of Bedfordshire's main campus on Park Street in Luton is approximately a 1-mile (15-minute) walk from the centre of High Town ward.

== Religious sites ==
There are a large number of churches in High Town, considering the number of people living in the ward.

The established church was St Matthew's on Wenlock Street. The Grade II listed building was erected in 1875–6 to a design by G Vialls in early English style. The ecclesiastical parish of High Town was created from parts of Luton, St Mary and Luton, Christ Church in 1877. The parish was dissolved on 25 April 2021 and the High Town area now falls within the parish of Luton, with St Mary’s the parish church.

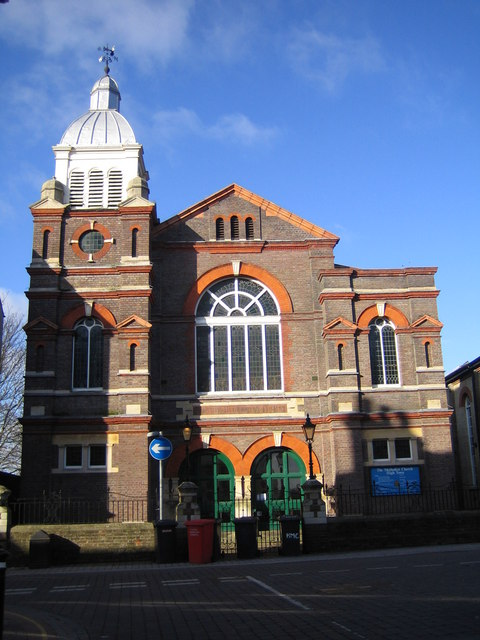
The Methodist Church on High Town Road

High Town Methodist Church on High Town Road is Grade II listed and has a galleried interior. The building, of Luton grey brick with red brick and stone dressing, dates from 1897 and is described in the listing as being in simple "neo-classical style with Byzantine overtones". A Baroque style cupola tops the front left bay. This church superseded the Wesleyan Chapel next door which became a Sunday school. The chapel, also Grade II listed was built in 1852 and is described as being in a "simplified classical style with some Italinate touches" and "unusual for the use of brick architectural polychromy on front." A large schoolroom was added to the rear in 1861.

=== Other places of worship ===
- BAPS Shri Swaminarayan Mandir (temple, Hindu), Crescent Road
- Christ Apostolic Church – East of Luton has been based in Kestin House on Crescent Road since 2011.
- Christ Embassy, High Town Road
- Family of God Church – Sunday worship meetings held at Hightown Community, Sports and Arts Centre, Concorde Street
- Hightown Baptist Church was formed in 1906 as the Luton Branch of the Old Baptist Union. The church building on Reginald Street was formally opened on 11 January 1913.
- Hope Church Luton has been based in the Polish Ex-Servicemen’s Club on Villa Road since 2010.
- Jehovah's Witnesses, Kingdom Hall, Old Bedford Road
- Luton Central Seventh-day Adventist Church, North Street The church building, originally a Wesleyan Methodist Chapel, has a datestone of 1913 and was bought by the Seventh-day Adventists in 1960.
- The Luton Worship Centre Church at 49 Old Bedford Road is based in the former Alban Neve Centre, originally built in the late 1950s for the deaf community.
- Masjid Ibrahim (mosque, Muslim), Dudley Street
- Park Church (part of Stopsley Baptist Church) is an outdoor gathering of mostly young families that has been meeting in People's Park since 2016.
- Po Shin Tao Teh Association (meeting place, Taoist), Havelock Rise
- St Ninians United Reformed Church is next door to Hope Church Luton on Villa Road.
- Winners' Chapel International Fellowship Centre on Taylor Street is a branch of the Living Faith Church Worldwide.

== Sport and leisure ==
Bedfordshire County Cricket Club plays some of its matches at Wardown Park, which is within the High Town ward boundary. The ground is also home to Luton Town and Indians Cricket Club, who introduced future England cricket star Monty Panesar to the game. Before graduating to first class cricket, Panesar also played for Bedfordshire CCC.

Hightown Community Sports & Arts Centre, Concorde Street, run by Active Luton, a Community Wellbeing Trust, offers a variety of sport and fitness activities. Luton Gymnastics Club is also based in Concorde Street. A range of dance classes is available at Tina's School of Dance on Taylor Street, as well as acrobatics, musical theatre and drama.

Luton Town Bowling Club on Bowling Green Lane was founded in 1907 and had six outdoor grass rinks. The club announced in 2021 that it was leaving Bowling Green Lane and would in future be sharing facilities with Ashcroft Bowls Club in Stopsley. Wardown Park Bowls Club was disbanded in 2021 due to falling membership; an adventure golf course has been created on the green. Wardown Park also has four tennis courts, an outdoor table tennis table and a basketball area.

== Local attractions ==
Key
| | Abbey/Priory/Cathedral |
| Accessible open space | Accessible open space |
| | Amusement/Theme Park |
| | Castle |
| Country Park | Country Park |
| | English Heritage |
| | Forestry Commission |
| Heritage railway | Heritage railway |
| Historic house | Historic House |
| Places of Worship | Places of Worship |
| Museum (free) Museum | Museum (free/not free) |
| National Trust | National Trust |
| | Theatre |
| | Zoo |

- Chiltern Hills
- Dunstable Downs
- The Hat Factory
- Leagrave Park
- Leighton Buzzard Light Railway
- Luton Hoo
- Luton Museum & Art Gallery
- Mossman Collection
- Someries Castle
- Stockwood Craft Museum
- Stockwood Park
- Waulud's Bank
- Wardown Park
- Whipsnade Tree Cathedral
- Whipsnade Wildlife Park
- Woodside Farm and Wildfowl Park
- Wrest Park Gardens
