= Putteridge =

Suburb of Luton, England

Coordinates: 51.905°N 0.383°W

- Location within Bedfordshire
- OS grid reference: TL112242
- Unitary authority: Luton
- Ceremonial county: Bedfordshire
- Region: East
- Country: England
- Sovereign state: United Kingdom
- Post town: LUTON
- Postcode district: LU2
- Dialling code: 01582
- Police: Bedfordshire
- Fire: Bedfordshire
- Ambulance: East of England
- UK Parliament: Luton South

Putteridge is a suburb at the north-eastern edge of Luton, in Bedfordshire, England. Putteridge is a little over 2 miles (3.2 km) from Luton town centre and bordered by Central Bedfordshire district to the north and North Hertfordshire district to the east. Wigmore Lane and Hayling Drive form the southern boundary and Cannon Lane and Stapleford Road the western.

== Local area ==
Many of Putteridge's houses were built in the 1930s by Janes Builders of Luton. The area is home to one of Luton's cemeteries, The Vale. The University of Bedfordshire's Putteridge Bury Campus is just over the border in Hertfordshire.

The area is surrounded by green space including Butterfield Green, a new industrial development currently being built. This is hoped to help boost the local economy of the area and Luton as a whole.

Putteridge Primary School and Putteridge High School serve the local areas including Stopsley, Round Green and Wigmore.

== Putteridge Bury ==
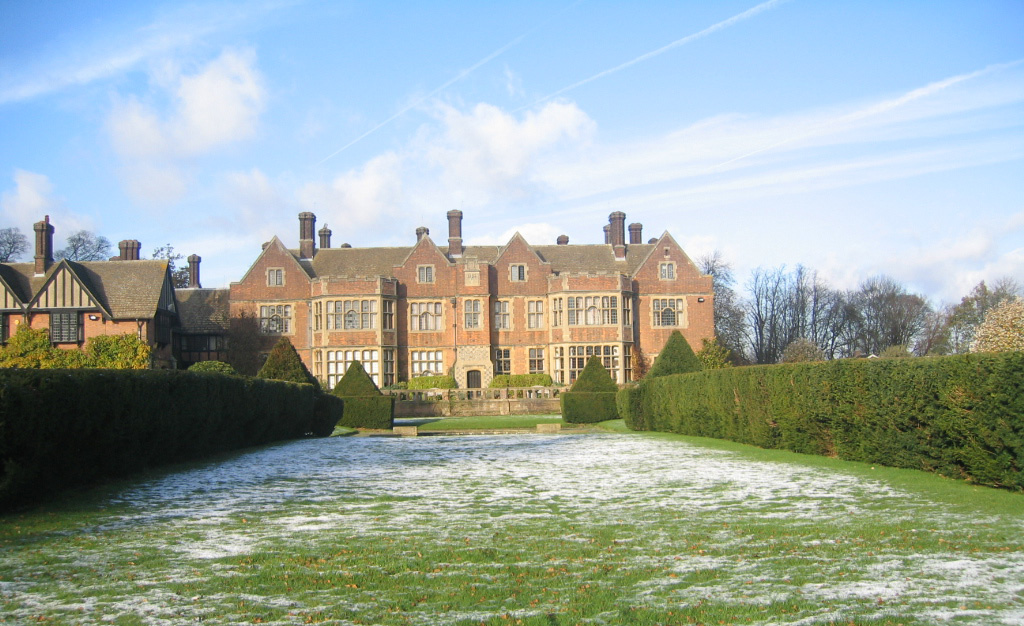
Putteridge Bury

The house at Putteridge Bury was built in the style of Chequers by architects Sir Ernest George and Alfred Yeats and was completed in 1911. The grounds were designed by Edwin L Lutyens with advice from Gertrude Jekyll.

== Politics ==
The area of Putteridge is part of the Stopsley and Wigmore wards, which form part of the parliamentary constituency of Luton South and the MP is Rachel Hopkins (Labour).

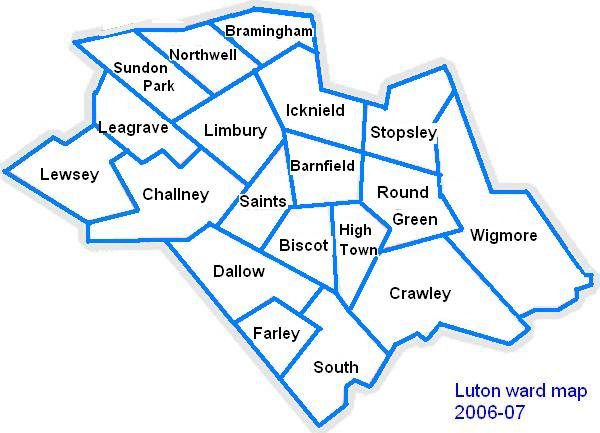
Map of Luton showing Stopsley

== Local attractions ==
Key
	Abbey/Priory/Cathedral
Accessible open space	Accessible open space
	Amusement/Theme Park
	Castle
Country Park	Country Park
	English Heritage
	Forestry Commission
Heritage railway	Heritage railway
Historic house	Historic House
Places of Worship	Places of Worship
Museum (free) Museum	Museum (free/not free)
National Trust	National Trust
	Theatre
	Zoo

- Dunstable Downs
- Chiltern Hills
- Leighton Buzzard Light Railway
- Luton Museum & Art Gallery
- The Hat Factory
- Luton Hoo
- Mossman Collection
- Someries castle
- Stockwood Craft Museum
- Stockwood Park
- Wardown Park
- Waulud's Bank
- Whipsnade Tree Cathedral
- Whipsnade Wildlife Park
- Woodside Farm and Wildfowl Park
- Wrest Park Gardens

== Local newspapers ==
Two weekly newspapers cover Putteridge, although they are not specific to the area.

- Herald and Post
- Luton News
