= New Town, Luton =

Coordinates: 51.8708°N 0.4135°W

New Town
- Location within Bedfordshire
- OS grid reference: TL093202
- Unitary authority: Luton
- Ceremonial county: Bedfordshire
- Region: East
- Country: England
- Sovereign state: United Kingdom
- Post town: LUTON
- Postcode district: LU1
- Dialling code: 01582
- Police: Bedfordshire
- Fire: Bedfordshire and Luton
- Ambulance: East of England
- UK Parliament: Luton South

New Town is a district of Luton, just south east of the town centre, in Bedfordshire, England. It is roughly bounded by Castle Street and London Road to the west, Seymour Road to the east, New Town Street to the north, and Cutenhoe Road to the south.

== Local area ==
Castle Street was the site of a medieval castle. The district has characteristic pubs and has traditionally been a working class area of the town. To alleviate the housing shortage of the 1960s several multi-story flats were built and an industrial park was added in the 1980s to attract new industries. The ring road, which passes nearby, was created at the same time to ease traffic congestion from the M1 motorway to the ever expanding Luton Airport.

== Politics ==
New Town is part of South ward, which is represented by Cllr David Agbley (Labour), Cllr Fatima Begum (Labour) and Cllr Javeria Hussain (Labour).

The ward forms part of the parliamentary constituency of Luton South and the MP is Rachel Hopkins (Labour).

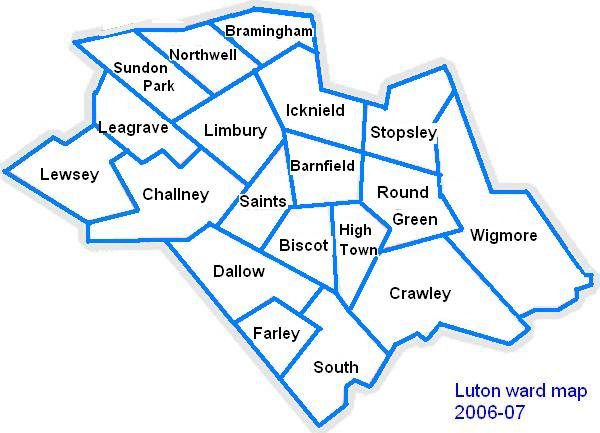
Map of Luton showing South Ward which contains New Town

== Local newspapers ==
Two weekly newspapers cover New Town, although they are not specific to the area.

- Herald and Post
- Luton News

== Local attractions ==
Key
	Abbey/Priory/Cathedral
Accessible open space	Accessible open space
	Amusement/Theme Park
	Castle
Country Park	Country Park
	English Heritage
	Forestry Commission
Heritage railway	Heritage railway
Historic house	Historic House
Places of Worship	Places of Worship
Museum (free) Museum	Museum (free/not free)
National Trust	National Trust
	Theatre
	Zoo

- Bramingham Woods
- Chiltern Hills
- Dunstable Downs
- The Hat Factory
- Leagrave Park
- Leighton Buzzard Light Railway
- Luton Hoo
- Luton Museum & Art Gallery
- Mossman Collection
- Someries castle
- Stockwood Craft Museum
- Stockwood Park
- Wardown Park
- Waulud's Bank
- Whipsnade Tree Cathedral
- Whipsnade Wildlife Park
- Woodside Farm and Wildfowl Park
- Wrest Park Gardens
