= Hitchin Yeshiva =

Yeshiva in Hitchin, United Kingdom

Coordinates: 51°56′55″N 0°20′55″W

Yeshivas Toras Chessed is a Jewish yeshiva, or rabbinical school. Its curriculum focuses on Torah study, emphasizing the study of Talmud and Jewish law. It is based in Wellbury House, Great Offley, near Hitchin in Hertfordshire. Previously, Wellbury House operated as an all-boys children’s home, run by St Christopher's Fellowship, for orphans and young people who had been placed under care orders for a variety of reasons. The home accommodated up to thirty boys, typically aged between 10 and 18, who were housed across three sections of the main building. As an orphan, it was one of several children's homes in which I was placed during my time in care, and I lived at Wellbury House for approximately five or six years.

Founded in about 1989, the yeshiva follows the Ashkenazi Orthodox ritual and is affiliated to the Union of Orthodox Hebrew Congregations. The yeshiva has about 200 students on a 6-acre (24,000 m^{2}) site.

== History ==
In 2021, the organiser of a service of remembrance event at the school was fined £10,000 for breaking lockdown restrictions. Approximately 150 people attended the event at a time when lockdown restrictions meant that a maximum of 30 people were allowed to attend funerals and a maximum of 6 people were allowed to attend celebration of life events.

== Leadership ==
When the Rosh Yeshiva (head) Rabbi A. SH. Stern became ill, the yeshiva relocated to London. A new Yeshiva named Or Torah was opened in Hitchin by his brother Y. M. Stern, who then claimed to be a partner also in the leadership of Toras Chessed.

When Rabbi A. SH. Stern died, there was a Din Torah re the leadership of the Toras Chessed yeshiva, between current Rosh Yeshiva, Chaim Babad and the children of A. SH. Stern: leadership was granted to Chaim Babad.

There was a concurrent Din Torah re control of the land in Hitchin; this between Chaim Babad, Y. M. Stern and the children of A. SH. Stern. Y. M. Stern claimed that he and B. Weisman were partners with Rabbi A. SH. Stern; therefore following the latter's relocation to London, Y.M. Stern and Weismann remained the only trustees on Toras Chesed and its properties. The Din Torah did not accept Y. M. Stern's version and declared that A. SH. Stern had been the only trustee; a compromise was then reached re shares in the land itself.
