= South, Luton =

Electoral ward of Luton, England

Coordinates: 51.871°N 0.419°W

South
- Location within Bedfordshire
- Population: 10,364
- OS grid reference: TL090203
- Unitary authority: Luton
- Ceremonial county: Bedfordshire
- Region: East
- Country: England
- Sovereign state: United Kingdom
- Post town: LUTON
- Postcode district: LU1
- Dialling code: 01582
- Police: Bedfordshire
- Fire: Bedfordshire
- Ambulance: East of England
- UK Parliament: Luton South

South is the name for a ward in the southern part of Luton, in the Luton district, in the ceremonial county of Bedfordshire, England. The ward includes New Town, Park Town, Chapel Langley, Capability Green and most of Luton town centre. Junction 10 of the M1 is just outside the ward. Both Luton Airport Parkway and Luton railway station are located within the ward. London Luton Airport is close by.

== Local area ==
The local area is a mixture of residential and commercial, yet the area itself has traditionally been associated with the working class population. However, a series of developments towards Stockwood Park and Golf Centre, on the edge of Luton, have helped to bring in new residents, lifting the area. There is a local business park, Capability Green, and nearby, Gypsy Lane Retail Park on the A1081 and towards Castle Street heading up towards the town centre, new businesses have been setting up, boosting the area further. There are a series of local pubs in the area with a diverse culture behind every one of them, making the area one of the most diverse in Luton.

== Education ==
South is home to Stockwood Park Academy, which has had a rich history, formerly being Stockwood High School, then merging with Rotheram High School to form South Luton High School. The school was a focus of attention in 2004 when the students staged a protest against measures imposed by the then headmistress, Sherry Gladwin. The school was taken over as an academy by Barnfield College who already owned the old Rotheram school site and in 2011 opened a brand new school and Barnfield South Academy moved in leaving the old site occupied by Surrey St JMI. In 2015 Barnfield South Academy was renamed South Academy for a short while before being renamed Stockwood Park Academy.

The area also house buildings for the University of Bedfordshire including accommodation.

== Transport ==
Being on the edge of Luton, South has multiple direct connections to the town centre, the M1 and London Luton Airport. The area is also next to Luton Airport Parkway railway station, providing it with links to London and Bedford.

== Environment ==
The area has a main green space of Stockwood Park to enjoy, but also sees the River Lea leave Luton through this area, meaning plenty of wildlife to enjoy as well. The area has good links with the local manor house, Luton Hoo with the countryside surrounding the area.

== Politics ==
South ward is represented by Cllr David Agbley (Labour), Cllr Fatima Begum (Labour) and Cllr Javeria Hussain (Labour). The ward forms part of the parliamentary constituency of Luton South and the MP is Rachel Hopkins (Labour).

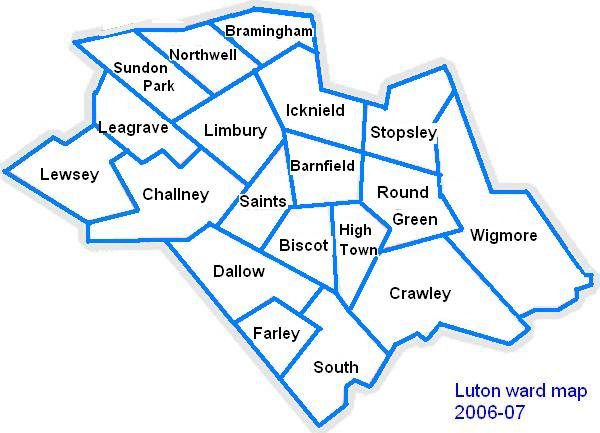
Map of Luton showing South ward

== Local newspapers ==
Two weekly newspapers cover South ward, although they are not specific to the area.

- Herald and Post
- Luton News

== Local attractions ==
Key
| | Abbey/Priory/Cathedral |
| Accessible open space | Accessible open space |
| | Amusement/Theme Park |
| | Castle |
| Country Park | Country Park |
| | English Heritage |
| | Forestry Commission |
| Heritage railway | Heritage railway |
| Historic house | Historic House |
| Places of Worship | Places of Worship |
| Museum (free) Museum | Museum (free/not free) |
| National Trust | National Trust |
| | Theatre |
| | Zoo |

- Bramingham Woods
- Chiltern Hills
- Dunstable Downs
- The Hat Factory
- Leagrave Park
- Leighton Buzzard Light Railway
- Luton Hoo
- Luton Museum & Art Gallery
- Mossman Collection
- Someries castle
- Stockwood Craft Museum
- Stockwood Park
- Wardown Park
- Waulud's Bank
- Whipsnade Tree Cathedral
- Whipsnade Wildlife Park
- Woodside Farm and Wildfowl Park
- Wrest Park Gardens
