= Putteridge High School =

Location
- Putteridge Road; Luton, Bedfordshire, LU2 8HJ; England; 51°54′19″N 0°22′54″W

Information
- Type: Academy
- Motto: Every Individual Matters
- Local authority: Luton Borough Council
- Trust: Chiltern Learning Trust
- Department for Education URN: 144311 Tables
- Ofsted: Reports
- Headteacher: David Graham
- Gender: Co-educational
- Age: 11 to 16
- School Ethos: First CLASS (Citizenship, Learning, Aspirations, Standards, School of Choice)
- Website: http://www.putteridgehigh.org/

Putteridge High School is a co-educational secondary school located in the Putteridge area of Luton, in the English county of Bedfordshire.

== History ==
It was previously a community school administered by Luton Borough Council. The school was also awarded specialist status as a Mathematics and Computing College. In February 2013, Ofsted rated this as a 'Good School'.

In March 2017 Putteridge High School converted to academy status and is now sponsored by the Chiltern Learning Trust. In 2019 the first Ofsted inspection of the school after academy conversion was rated as 'Good', with the school said to be showing rapid improvement. The school was also awarded the International School Award for 2018 to 2021.

== Buildings ==
In 2019 it was announced that funding and permission had been obtained to demolish and completely rebuild the school site. The new school build has been completed. The sports hall was completed in 2020.

== Academics ==
Virtually all maintained schools and academies follow the National Curriculum, and are inspected by Ofsted on how well they succeed in delivering a 'broad and balanced curriculum'. The school has to decide whether Key Stage 3 contains years 7, 8 and 9- or whether year 9 should be in Key Stage 4 and the students just study subjects that will be examined by the GCSEs exams at 16. Putteridge had decided to take the latter approach. Putteridge High School offers Key Stage 3 and Key Stage 4 only. There is no sixth form or Key Stage 5. The school also offers The Duke of Edinburgh's Award programme. All students continued in education after leaving the school. The school maintains German as a Key Stage 4 option, and has a German partner school, the Theisstalschule, Niedernhausen with whom they do regular visits and joint music and outdoor pursuits activities. The link was established through the Comenius programme. The visit in December 2019 was funded by the British Council, and included visits to Frankfurt, Mainz and Wiesbaden.

=== Key Stage 3 ===
In year 7 and year 8, the pupils follow the Key Stage 3 National Curriculum. They are set in Maths and English. They have lessons in:

Art	Computing	Design and Technology	Drama
English Language	English Literature	French	Geography
History	Mathematics	Music	Philosophy and Ethics
Physical Education		Science	

=== Key Stage 4 ===
The core subjects studies are:

GCSE Maths, English and Combined Science
Philosophy and Ethics (Non Exam Course)
Physical Education (Non Exam Course)

In addition they choose 4 extra subjects, called options, One must be History of Geoography, in order to fulfill the EBACC requirements. The other subjects can varied each year but come from this list. Some students will also be able to take triple science.

Art and Design	Food and Technology	ICT	Business Studies
French	Media Studies	Computer Science	Geography
Music	Spanish	Religious Studies	Drama
Health and Social Care	Sport and Physical Education	Fashion and Textiles	History
Music Technology	Three Dimensional Design	Photography	

== Values and ethos ==
Under the leadership of Headteacher David Graham, Putteridge High School operates under the motto and values framework "First CLASS", an acronym standing for Citizenship, Learning, Aspirations, Standards, and School of Choice. This framework focuses on developing students into respectful citizens and breaking down social or personal learning barriers. In evaluation records, inspectors noted that pupils actively work to model themselves as "first class learners" and community members.

The values system directly anchors the Putteridge High First Class Reward Scheme (PHFC), evaluating holistic student development. To earn milestones, students must hit strict termly benchmarks:

- Maintaining a minimum of 98% attendance
- Incurring no more than three late arrivals per period
- Accumulating fewer than five behavior points
- Achieving a "First Class" or "Good" Attitude to Learning (ATL) grade
- Submitting all classroom homework punctually

Meeting these metrics qualifies students for Bronze, Silver, or Gold excellence statuses, recognized in termly assemblies and reward trips. Accomplishments also award house points toward the competitive House System (Green, Blue, Red, Yellow).

=== Impact on attendance ===
The rewards scheme has successfully maintained school-wide attendance rates significantly above national baselines. According to Laura Bartoletti, Deputy Headteacher and Designated Safeguarding Lead (DSL) with strategic oversight for behaviour and attendance, the 98% milestone threshold is tied to high-engagement incentives such as cinema excursions and garden parties, alongside attendance pin badges that students wear on their blazers with pride.

Bartoletti's framework has driven school-wide attendance rates to an average of approximately 96%, compared to a secondary school national baseline of 91.7%. This structure led to the school being recognized by the Department for Education (DfE) as a Centre of Excellence for attendance, with its pastoral case studies subsequently published within the DfE Attendance Toolkit and utilized in national policy resources.

== Former students ==
- Danny Cannon – Film and television director, screenwriter, and producer.
- David Galbraith – is an English former footballer who played as a midfielder.
- James Justin – Professional footballer for Leeds United and the England national team.
- Elizabeth Price – Visual artist, academic at Kingston University, and winner of the 2012 Turner Prize.
- Tommy Robinson – Political activist and co-founder of the English Defence League.
