= Stopsley High School =

Location
- St Thomas's Road; Luton, Bedfordshire, LU2 7UX; England
- Coordinates: 51°54′06″N 0°24′22″W

Information
- Type: Academy
- Local authority: Luton
- Trust: Middlesex Learning Trust
- Department for Education URN: 148692 Tables
- Ofsted: Reports
- Headteacher: Karen Hand
- Gender: Co-educational
- Age: 11 to 16
- Enrolment: 1,350
- Website: www.stopsleyhighschool.co.uk

Stopsley High School is a co-educational secondary school located in the Stopsley area of Luton, Bedfordshire, England.

== History ==
In September 2002 Stopsley High became a designated specialist sports college. It was re-designated in 2007 with Music nominated as its second subject.

As a part of Building Schools for the Future (BSF) programme the school's capacity was expanded from 990 to 1350.

Previously a foundation school administered by Luton Borough Council, in September 2021 Stopsley High School converted to academy status. It is now sponsored by the Middlesex Learning Trust.

== Uniform ==
The main colours of the Stopsley High Schools uniform are black and blue. Boys wear black trousers and girls have the option of black trousers or a black skirt. The tie is black and blue with the school logo, but prefects wear special ties with their house logo replacing the school's. The shirt can be accompanied by a black jumper with the Stopsley motif on the left breast.

The Stopsley High School sports kits is all black with the school's logo on it. Students have the option of wearing a t-shirt and shorts or a tracksuit in this style.

== Curriculum ==
Stopsley High School teaches the following subjects:

Compulsory, all years

- Maths, English, Science, PE, PSHE

Compulsory KS3 only

- ICT

Compulsory KS3, optional KS4

- French, Spanish, History, Geography, Music, Art, Dance, Ethics and Philosophy, Drama, Construction, Food and Nutrition, Design & Technology

Optional KS4 only

- Sociology, Computer Science, Child Development, Creative iMedia, PE (GCSE)

== Notable former pupils ==
- Stacey Dooley - television presenter and documentary filmmaker
- Monty Panesar - cricketer who played for Northamptonshire, Sussex, Essex and England
- Bruce Rioch - professional footballer, football manager, Luton Town Football Club, Arsenal Football Club
- Neil Rioch - professional footballer, Luton Town FC, Aston Villa FC, Portland Timbers FC, USA, England Youth international
- Alan Slough - professional footballer, Luton Town FC, Fulham FC
- Rodney Bewes - actor, The Likely Lads
