= Offley =

Civil parish in Hertfordshire, England

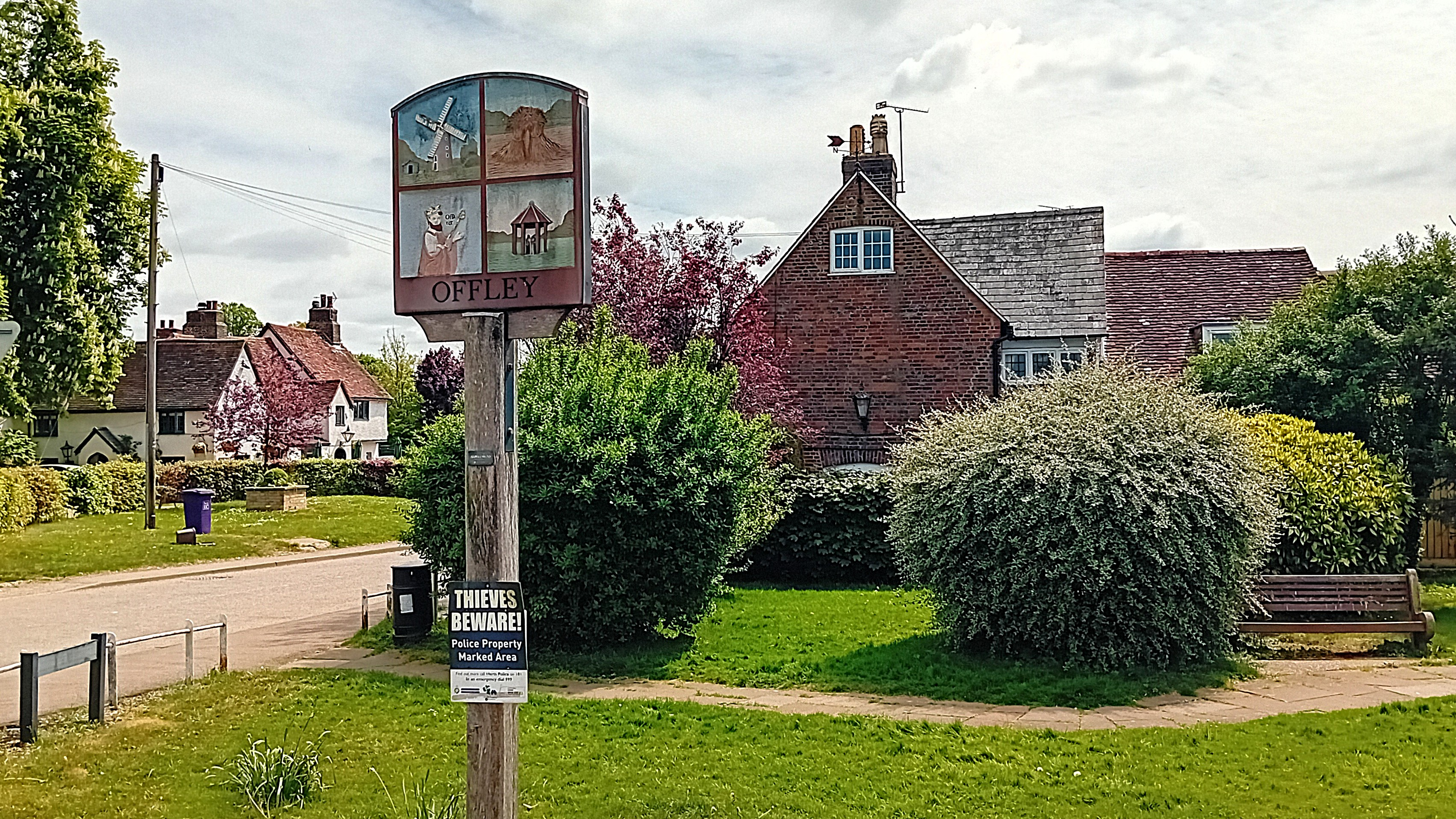
- Offley village sign with Green Man public house behind to left

- Location within Hertfordshire
- Population: 1,646 (Parish, 2021)
- OS grid reference: TL148262
- District: North Hertfordshire
- Shire county: Hertfordshire
- Region: East
- Country: England
- Sovereign state: United Kingdom
- Post town: HITCHIN
- Postcode district: SG5
- Post town: LUTON
- Postcode district: LU2
- Dialling code: 01462; 01582
- Police: Hertfordshire
- Fire: Hertfordshire
- Ambulance: East of England
- UK Parliament: Hitchin

Offley is a civil parish in the North Hertfordshire district of Hertfordshire, England. The main village is Great Offley, also known as Offley, which stands on a ridge of high ground. The parish covers most of the area between the towns of Hitchin to the east and Luton to the west. The northern part of the parish lies within the designated Area of Outstanding Natural Beauty of the Chiltern Hills. The parish also includes numerous hamlets, including Little Offley, Cockernhoe, and Tea Green. At the western end of the parish, adjoining the edge of Luton, is the Putteridge Bury estate which now serves as a campus of the University of Bedfordshire. The parish had a population of 1,646 at the 2021 census.

== Great Offley ==
Great Offley lies on the top of a chalk escarpment ridge (521 ft/159 metres above sea level) in the centre of the parish (the most north eastern ridge of the Chiltern Hills). Road signs and Ordnance Survey maps call the village Great Offley, but the Royal Mail just uses Offley in postal addresses.

Offa, King of Mercia in the 8th century, is said to have built a palace here and thus gave his name to the village. There is a most interesting group of buildings, including Offley Place, which was rebuilt in 1810 but which retains a Tudor porch and a 17th-century wing.

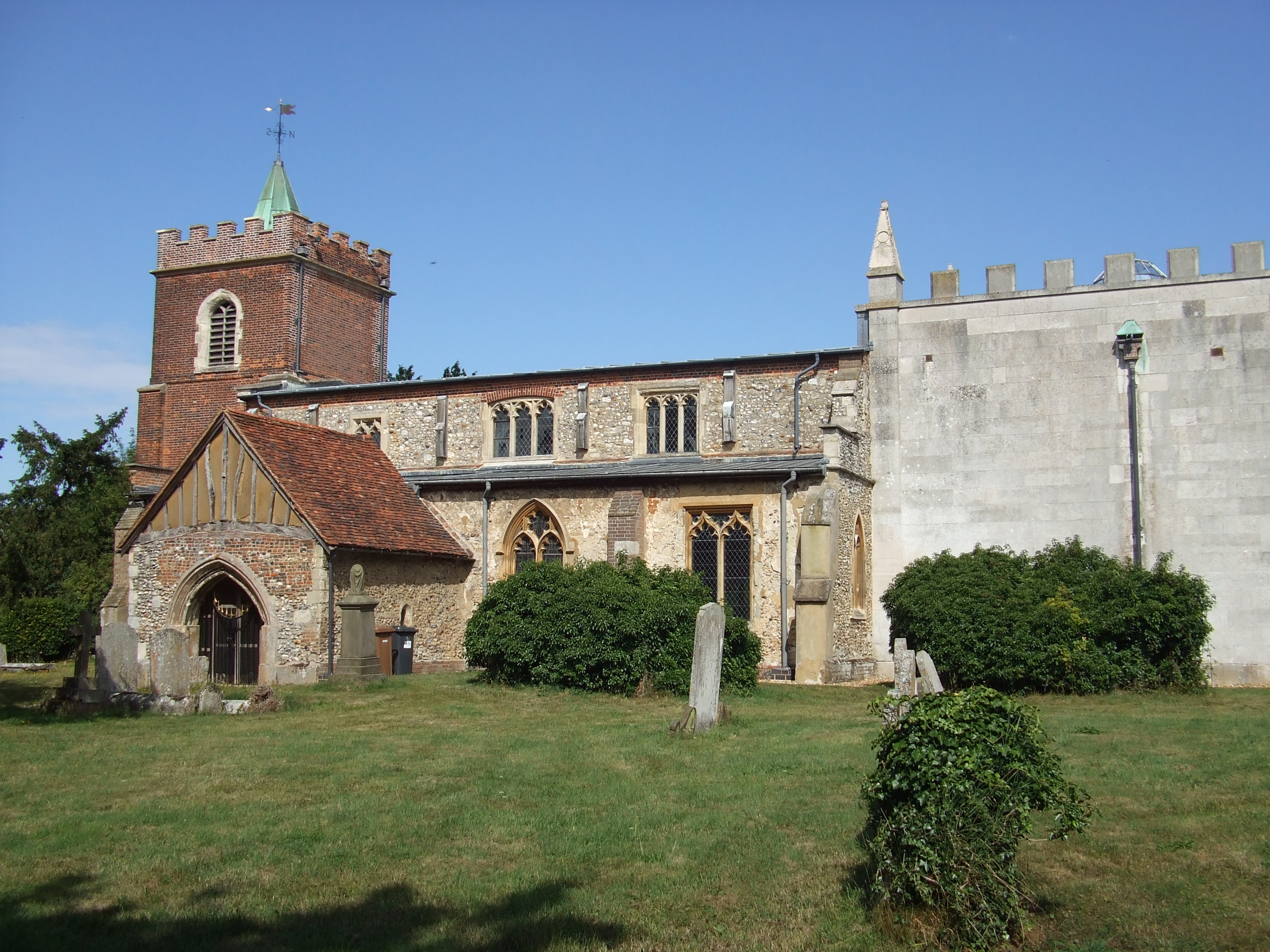
St Mary Magdalene's Church

The parish church is dedicated to St Mary Magdalene and contains some attractive monuments. Its nave dates back to the 13th century. The chancel was extensively remodelled by Sir Thomas Salusbury in the 18th century, and the tower was rebuilt in brick in 1800.

The village was by-passed by the A505 dual carriageway in the 1970s. Close to the centre of the village is a water tower, near which stands a radio mast owned by Arqiva and used by utility companies. The village has two public houses, the Green Man and the Red Lion, a primary school, and a village hall.

== Little Offley ==
Little Offley is a small hamlet lying 1 1/2 miles north-west of Great Offley, and it is reached via a bridge over the A505. It contains a late Tudor brick-built manor house.

The Hitchin Yeshiva is based in Wellbury House which is a mile north east of Little Offley.

== Cockernhoe ==
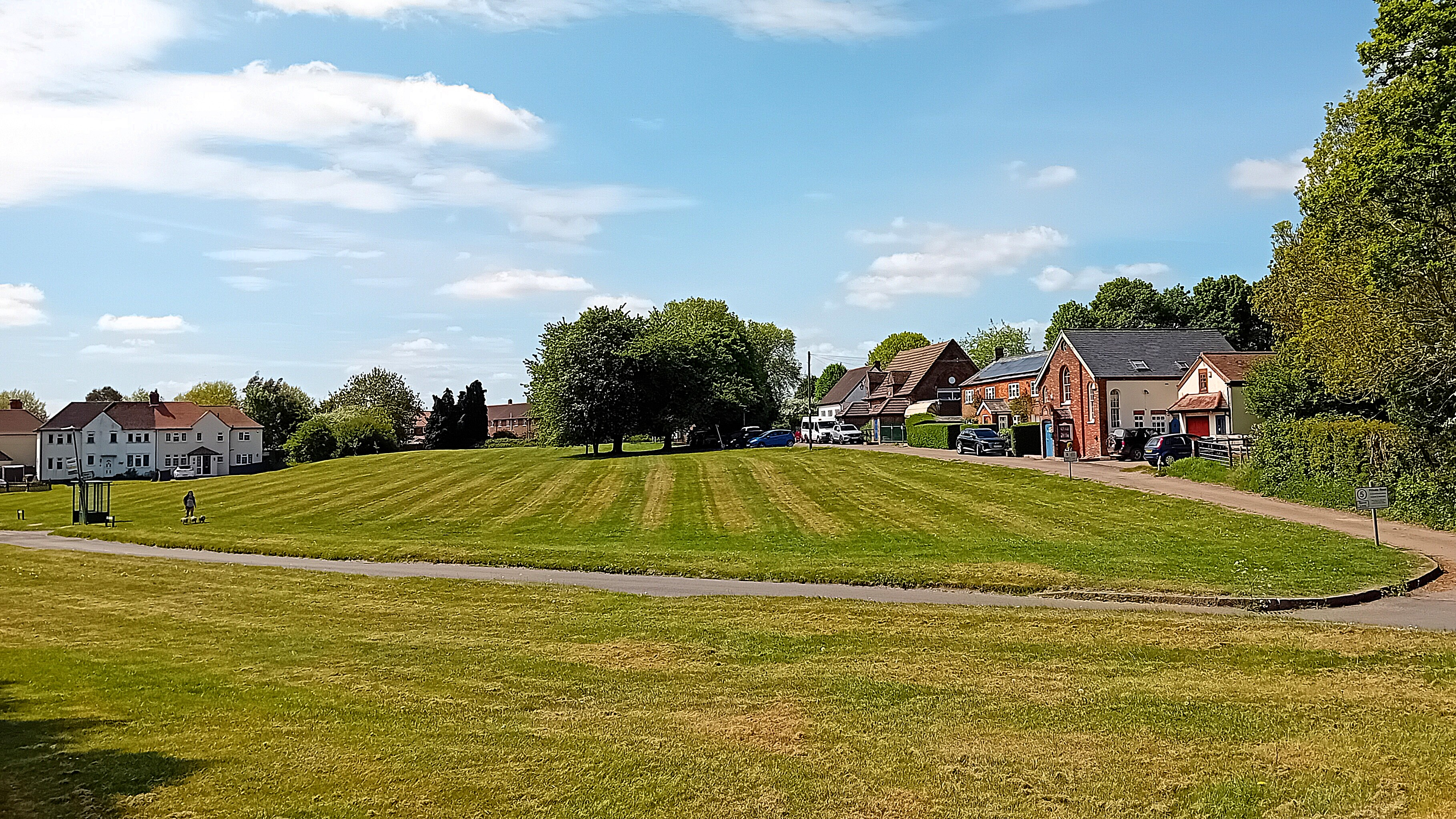
Cockernhoe Green

Cockernhoe lies 2 1/2 miles south-west of Great Offley. Cockernhoe is clustered around two greens. To the south is the larger Cockernhoe Green, where there is a primary school and a small tin tabernacle church dedicated to St Hugh. To the north is the smaller Mangrove Green, where there is a pub, the King William IV.

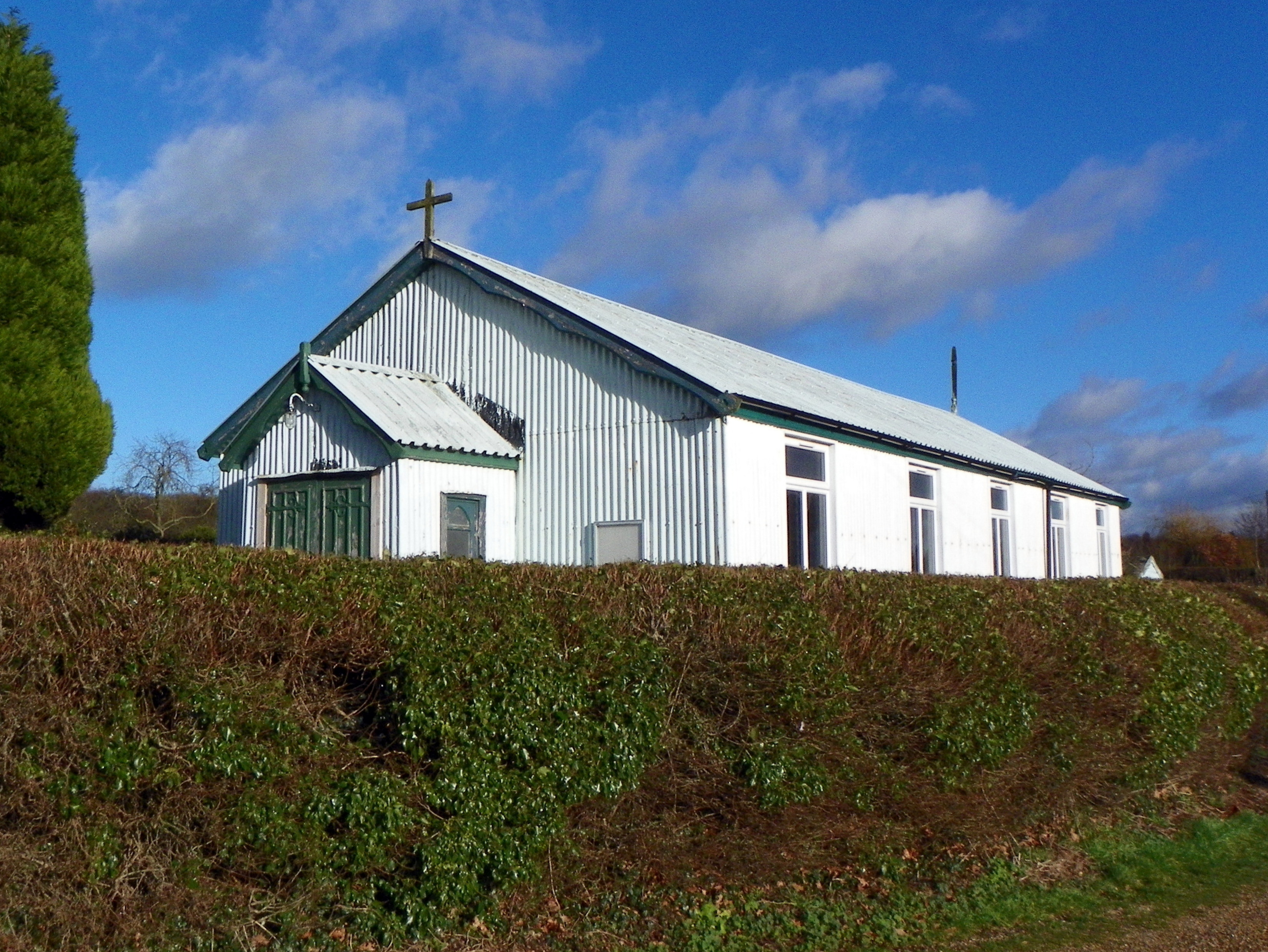
St Hugh's Church, Cockernhoe

Much of the area between Cockernhoe and the eastern edge of Luton is allocated for development as an eastern extension of Luton for approximately 2,100 homes as part of the North Hertfordshire Local Plan, adopted in 2022. The scheme is opposed by Offley Parish Council, as well as campaign groups including Campaign to Protect Rural England and a local group called Keep East of Luton Green.

== Tea Green ==
The hamlet of Tea Green lies 2 1/2 miles south of Great Offley. Tea Green sits on top of a chalk ridge on the opposite side of Lilley Bottom Valley. A major landmark is the tall water tower which is next to the White Horse pub.

Two of the oldest barns in the area (dating from the 16th century) are located at Tankards and Crutchmore Farms.

== Putteridge Bury ==
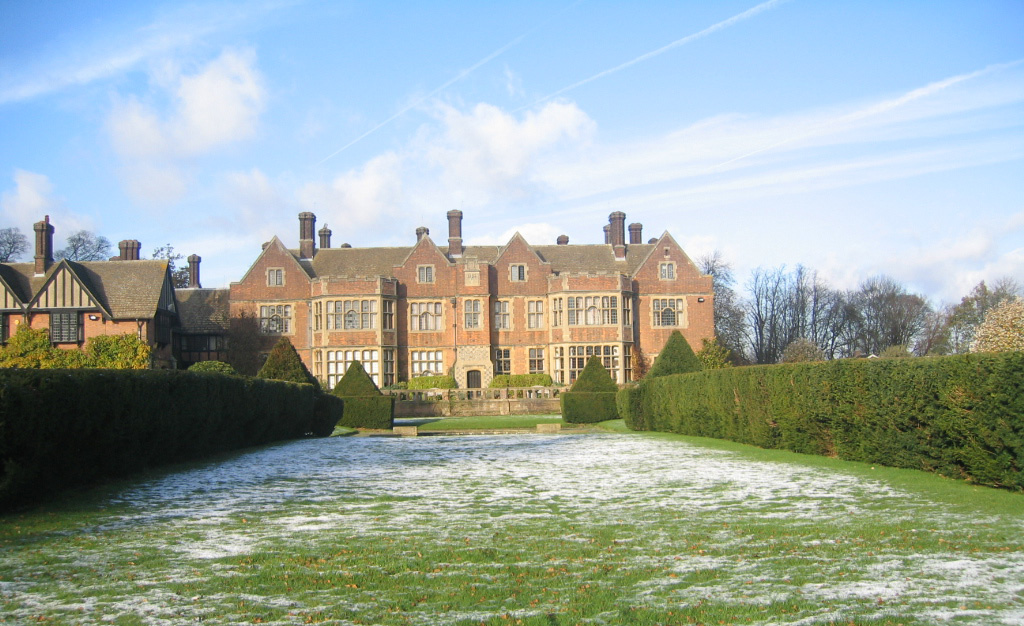
Putteridge Bury

The Putteridge Bury estate comprises the grounds of a mansion designed by Ernest George and Alfred Yeats in the style of Chequers. It was completed in 1911, replacing an earlier house on the site. The grounds were redesigned by Edwin Lutyens and planted by Gertrude Jekyll. Particular features are the reflective pool and massive yew hedges. The estate was bought by Luton Borough Council in 1965 to serve as a teacher training college. It has remained in educational use since then; since 2006, it has been a campus of the University of Bedfordshire.

The Putteridge estate is a mixture of arable farmland and woodland; as well as the occasional visiting muntjac and fallow deer, the estate is home to Lady Amherst's pheasant (Chrysolophus amherstiae) as well as the more common pheasant.

== Landscape ==
The land use in the parish is a mixture of arable, and woodland with some minor seasonal grazing for beef cattle and sheep. To the east of the village all the round to the south east forms part of the King's Walden estate. During the winter months pheasant and partridge shooting takes with several shooting syndicates operating to the north of the village as well as a big shoot organised by King's Walden Estate.

Red kites along with common buzzard and sparrowhawks can be seen in the area.

Much of the woodland is not used for timber and is made up of oak, beech and horse chestnut trees, with smaller plantations of pine and spruce. During the spring many of the woods are carpeted with bluebells.

The area is home to a sizeable herd of fallow deer and muntjac can also be seen.

=== Chiltern Way ===
The 152-mile Chiltern Way long-distance footpath passes through the parish, as does the 170-mile Chilterns Cycleway.

== Governance ==
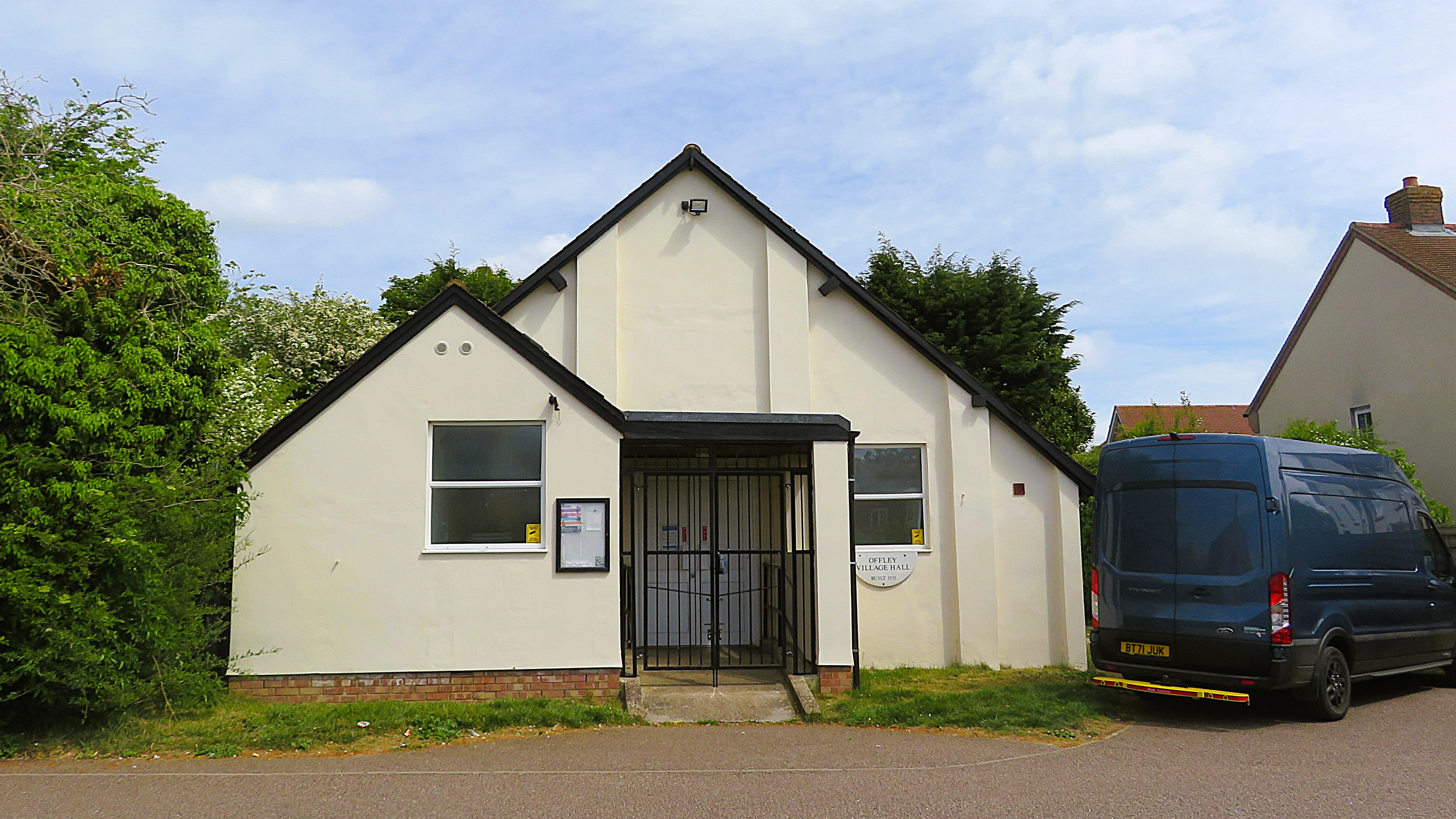
Offley Village Hall

There are three tiers of local government covering Offley, at parish, district, and county level: Offley Parish Council, North Hertfordshire District Council, and Hertfordshire County Council. The parish council generally meets alternately at Offley Village Hall and Cockernhoe Memorial Hall.

== Offley at War 1939 - 1945 ==
Offley was Headquarters for an Auxiliary Territorial Service (ATS) Searchlight unit based in Hoo Lane, that had detachments in Hitchin along Bedford Road, Chapel Foot along London Road, as well as at Whitwell and Diamond End.

=== Lancaster bomber crash ===
At 7.15am on 18 July 1944 a Lancaster Mk.111 bomber belonging to 115 Squadron RAF crashed into the farmhouse at West End Farm (51°56′03″N 0°20′35″W) killing the crew as well as the farmer's wife and two daughters (one of whom was home on leave from the Auxiliary Territorial Service).

The aircraft LM616 (KO J) had left its base at RAF Witchford near Ely several hours earlier to support Allied ground forces taking part in Operation Goodwood during the Normandy campaign. The Royal Air Force and United States Army Air Forces objective was to bomb units of the 16th Luftwaffe Field Division and the 21st Panzer Division which were located around Caen, France.

LM616 received severe damage during the raid, in which its controls and navigation aids were shot up. The aircraft had descended through low cloud only to see the high escarpment of the Chiltern Hills at Offley loom into view too late for the crew to take immediate action. The aircraft hit trees in a wood on top of Birkitt Hill before colliding with the farmhouse at West End Farm.

=== Glebe Farm Explosion ===
At 3 pm on 8 January 1945, a US Army lorry carrying munitions was involved in a road accident with a petrol tanker as it was passing Glebe Farm at the Flints.

The drivers managed to evacuate nearby residents; however, a bus from Luton came round the corner just as an explosion occurred, killing three US servicemen on the bus and injuring 21 others. The explosion was so severe that it made a crater on the road 50 feet wide and 14 feet deep.

The Windmill and Farm were completely destroyed and Flint cottages were severely damaged, other houses in Offley suffered extensive blast damage.

== Population ==
At the 2021 census, the population of the parish was 1,646. The population had been 1,307 in 2001, and 1,398 in 2011.

== Sport and recreation ==
- Offley and Stopsley Cricket Club, play at the Recreation Ground.
- Offley and District Riding Club have at least four shows at the Old Football Field, Luton White Hill.
- Luton and District Aeronautical Society fly remote control model aircraft at a field at the top of Chalk Hill to the south east of the village.

There is also a fishing club which uses the Long Pond and the Pump Pond which are located along Salusbury Lane.
