= The Great Northern, Luton =

Pub in Luton, Bedfordshire, England

Coordinates: 51°52′52″N 0°24′52″W

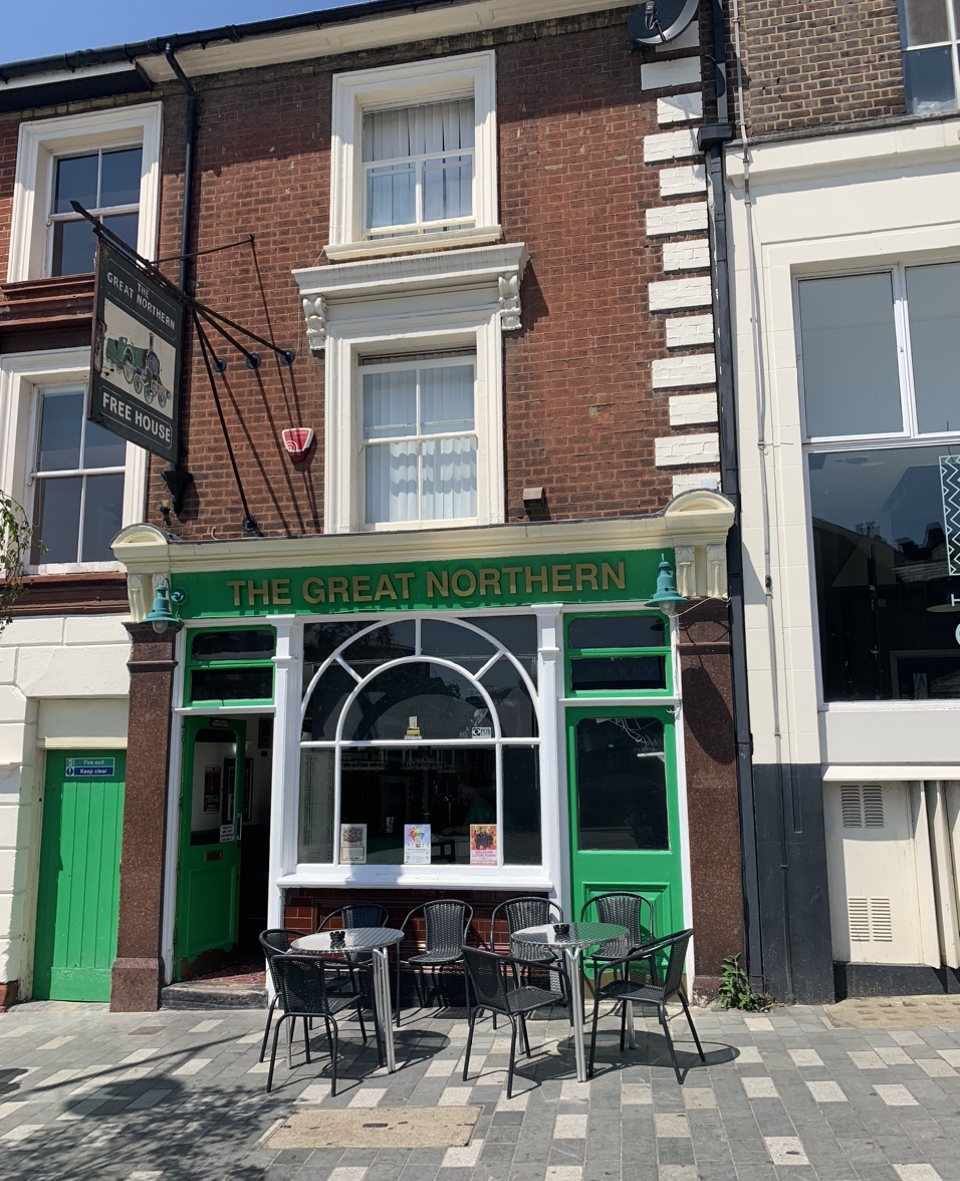
The Great Northern

The Great Northern is a pub at 63 Bute Street, Luton, Bedfordshire. The 19th-century building is Grade II listed.

The interior is largely unaltered since the 1930s. It is on the Campaign for Real Ale's Regional Inventory of Historic Pub Interiors for East Anglia.

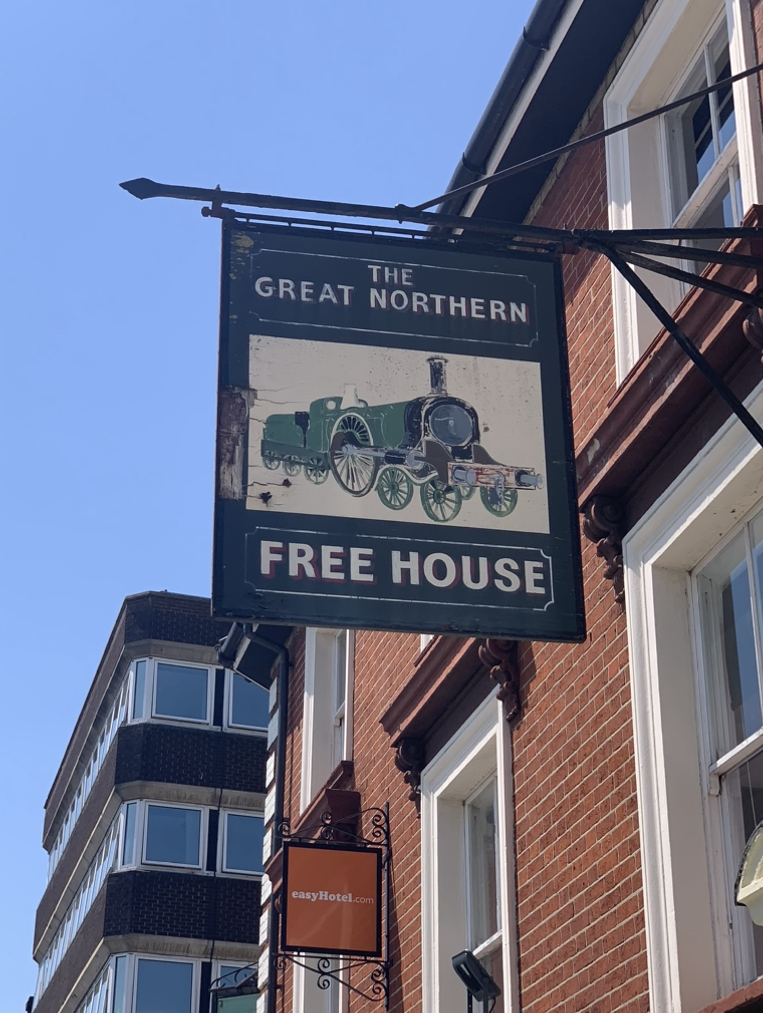
Pub sign of the Great Northern
