= Stopsley =

Suburb of Luton, England

Coordinates: 51.899°N 0.396°W

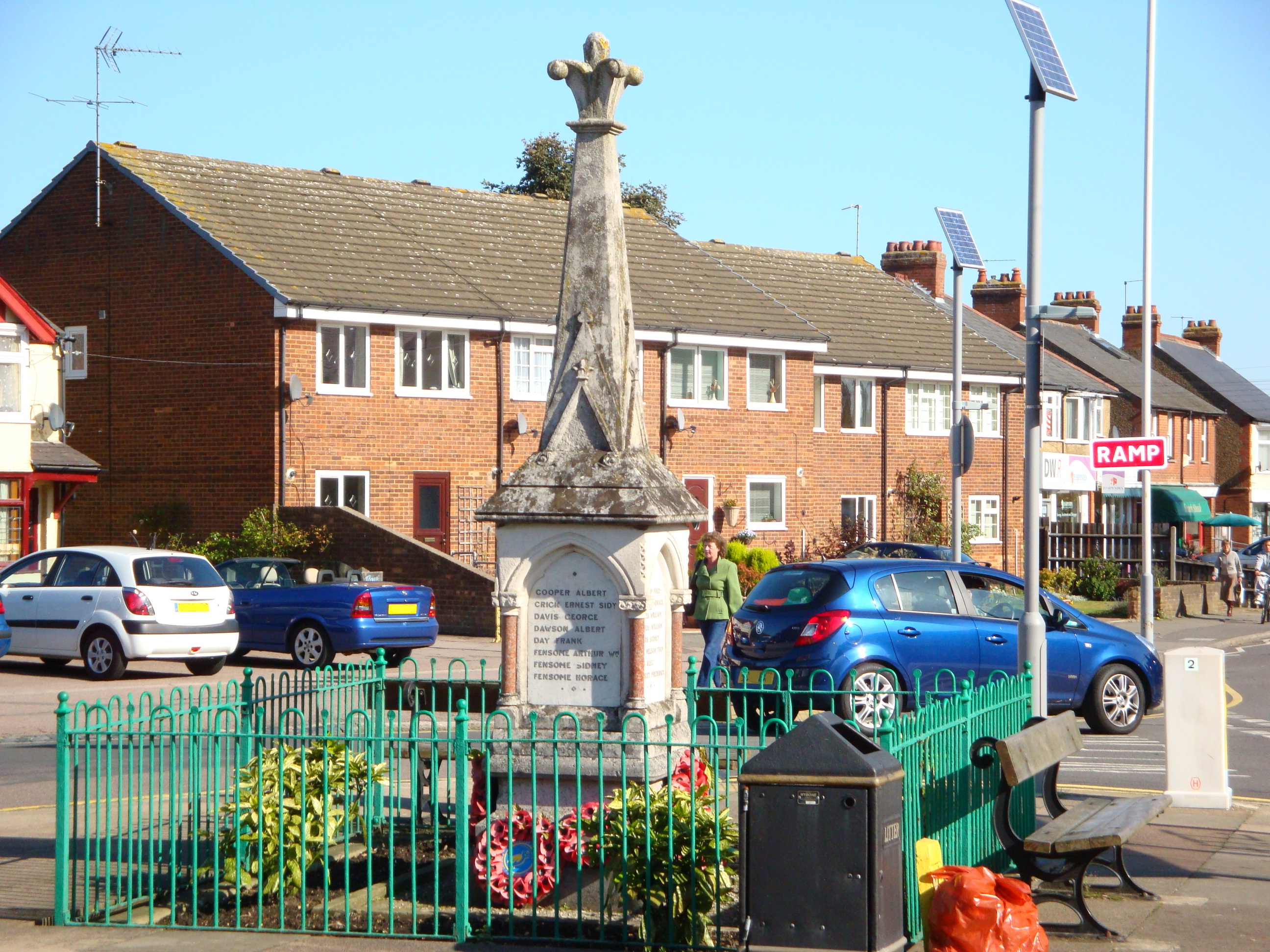
- Stopsley War Memorial

- Location within Bedfordshire
- Population: 7,760
- OS grid reference: TL103235
- Unitary authority: Luton
- Ceremonial county: Bedfordshire
- Region: East
- Country: England
- Sovereign state: United Kingdom
- Post town: LUTON
- Postcode district: LU2
- Dialling code: 01582
- Police: Bedfordshire
- Fire: Bedfordshire
- Ambulance: East of England
- UK Parliament: Luton South

Stopsley is a suburb in the north-east of Luton, Bedfordshire, England. The area is roughly bounded by the edge of Luton to the north, Vauxhall Way and Turners Road North to the south, Bradgers Hill to the west, and Cannon Lane, Stapleford Road and Brays Road to the east.

== Etymology ==
Frederick Davis, writing in 1965 believed the name of Stopsley to come from Scrobbale, (in Saxon;) Scrapes or Scroppeslie, (in Norman;) Shrubsley, (in English.;) meaning a hill covered with scrobbes (shrubs or underwood.) Most modern etymologists consider the name to be made up of two elements 'Stopp' and 'ley'. dating between AD 750 and AD 950. The ending comes from the Old English 'leah' meaning a wood or clearing in a wood. 'Stopp' was a personal name and indicated ownership of the wood or clearing. It appears as 'Stopeslegh in Soca de Luton' in a (Latin) law record, dated 1440.

Originally a hill-top village settlement, on 1 April 1896 it became a civil parish, formed from part of the parish of Luton Rural, on 1 April 1933 most of the urbanised part of the parish of Stopsley became part of Luton when the boundaries were extended, with the rural areas going to Hyde and Streatley with Sharpenhoe. In 1931 the parish had a population of 1474.

== Local area ==
The centre of Stopsley is made up of a variety of shops around a village church. From a distance the skyline is dominated by Jansel House, an office block built in 1961 which houses the Luton VAT office over a parade of shops at street level. One of Luton's two cemeteries, The Vale, is located nearby on the Hitchin Road.

== Politics ==
Stopsley is part of the larger Stopsley ward which also includes Putteridge and part of Ramridge End. The ward is represented by Cllr David Wynn (Liberal Democrats) and Cllr Richard Underwood (Liberal Democrats). The ward forms part of the parliamentary constituency of Luton South and the MP is Rachel Hopkins (Labour Party).

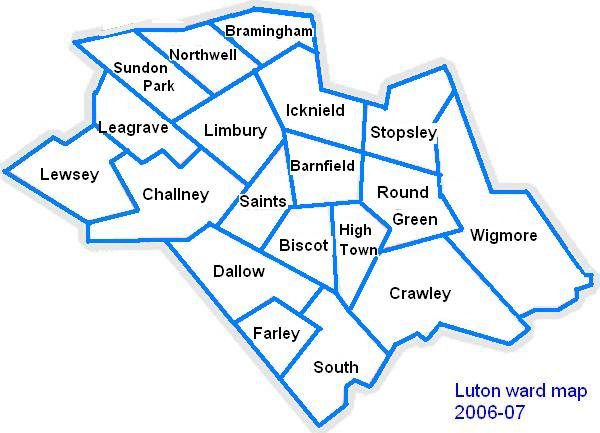
Map of Luton showing Stopsley

== Local attractions ==
Key
	Abbey/Priory/Cathedral
Accessible open space	Accessible open space
	Amusement/Theme Park
	Castle
Country Park	Country Park
	English Heritage
	Forestry Commission
Heritage railway	Heritage railway
Historic house	Historic House
Places of Worship	Places of Worship
Museum (free) Museum	Museum (free/not free)
National Trust	National Trust
	Theatre
	Zoo

- Dunstable Downs
- Chiltern Hills
- Leighton Buzzard Light Railway
- Luton Museum & Art Gallery
- The hat Factory
- Luton Hoo
- Mossman Collection
- Someries castle
- Stockwood Craft Museum
- Stockwood Park
- Wardown Park
- Waulud's Bank
- Whipsnade Tree Cathedral
- Whipsnade Wildlife Park
- Woodside Farm and Wildfowl Park
- Wrest Park Gardens
- Inspire Sports Village

== Education ==
Stopsley includes the specialist Sports College, Stopsley High School. Notable alumni include professional cricketer Monty Panesar. In the 1960s, Stopsley Infant and Junior School pupils included Alec Jeffreys, who went on to discover the DNA genetic fingerprint. He is now Professor of Genetics at Leicester University and was Knighted in 1994. Another pupil, David Renwick, created the television series 'One Foot in the Grave' and 'Jonathan Creek'. Both went on to study at Luton Grammar School and Luton Sixth Form College.

== Gallery ==
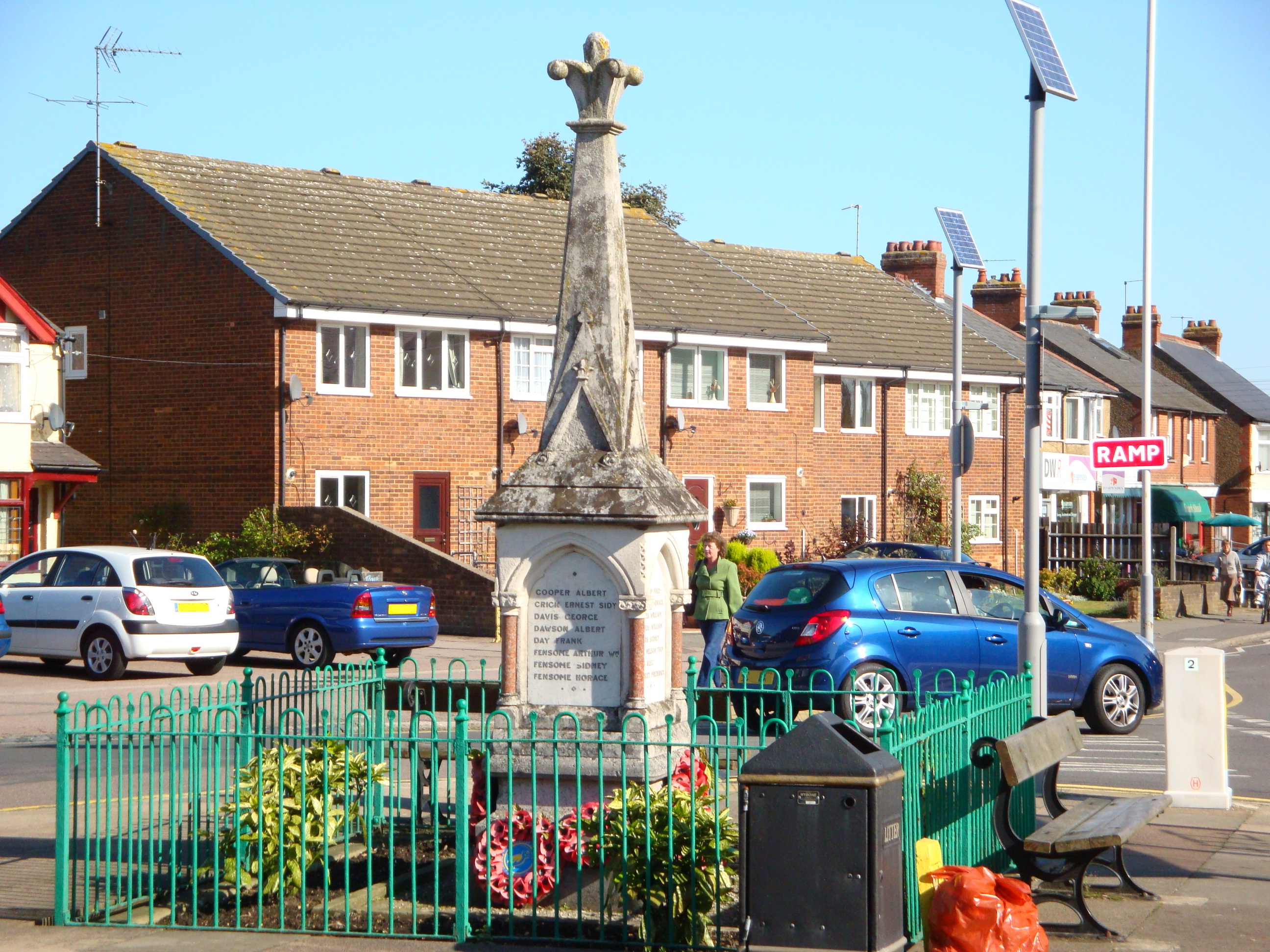
Stopsley War Memorial

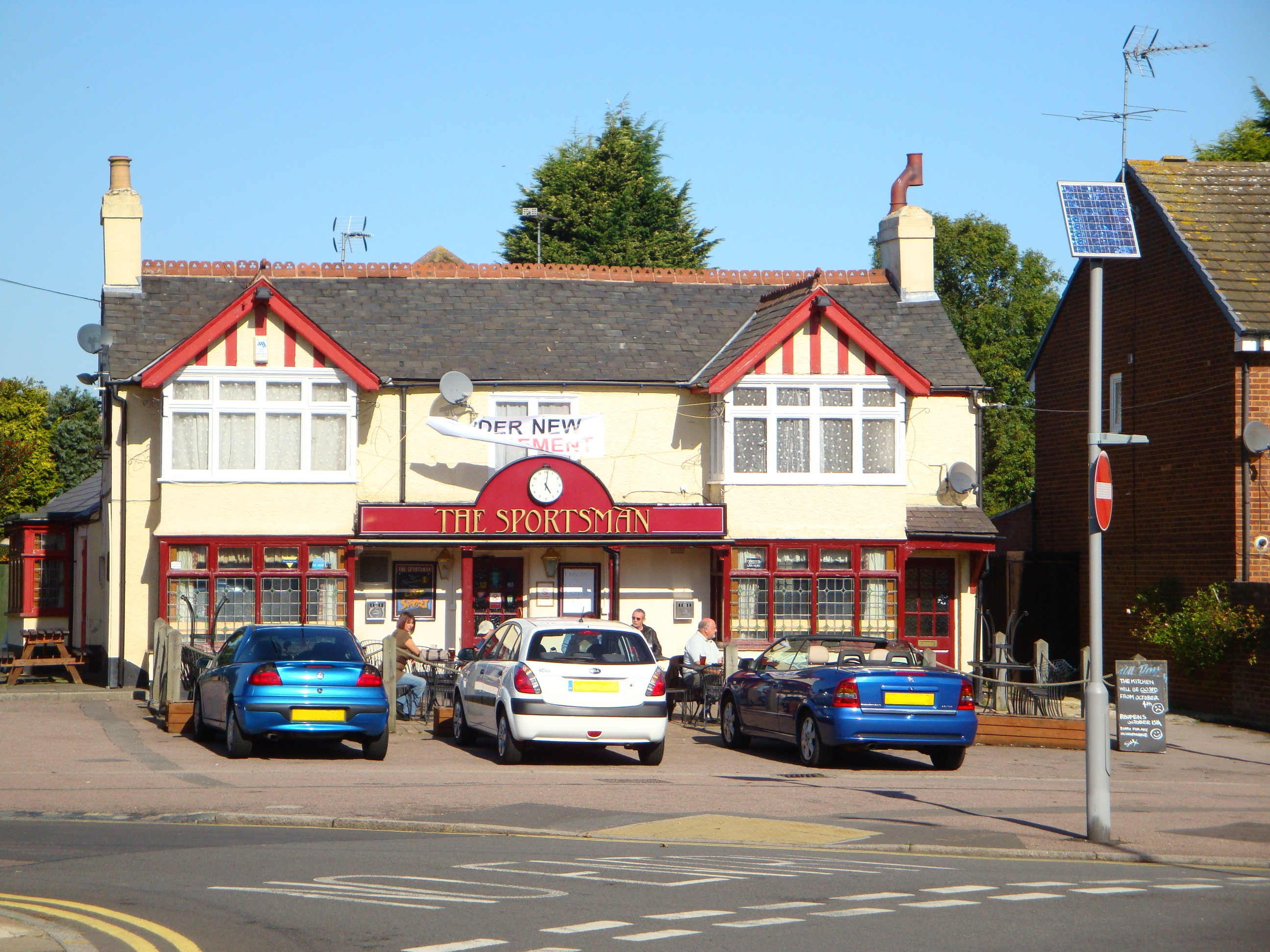
The Sportsman Public House in Stopsley

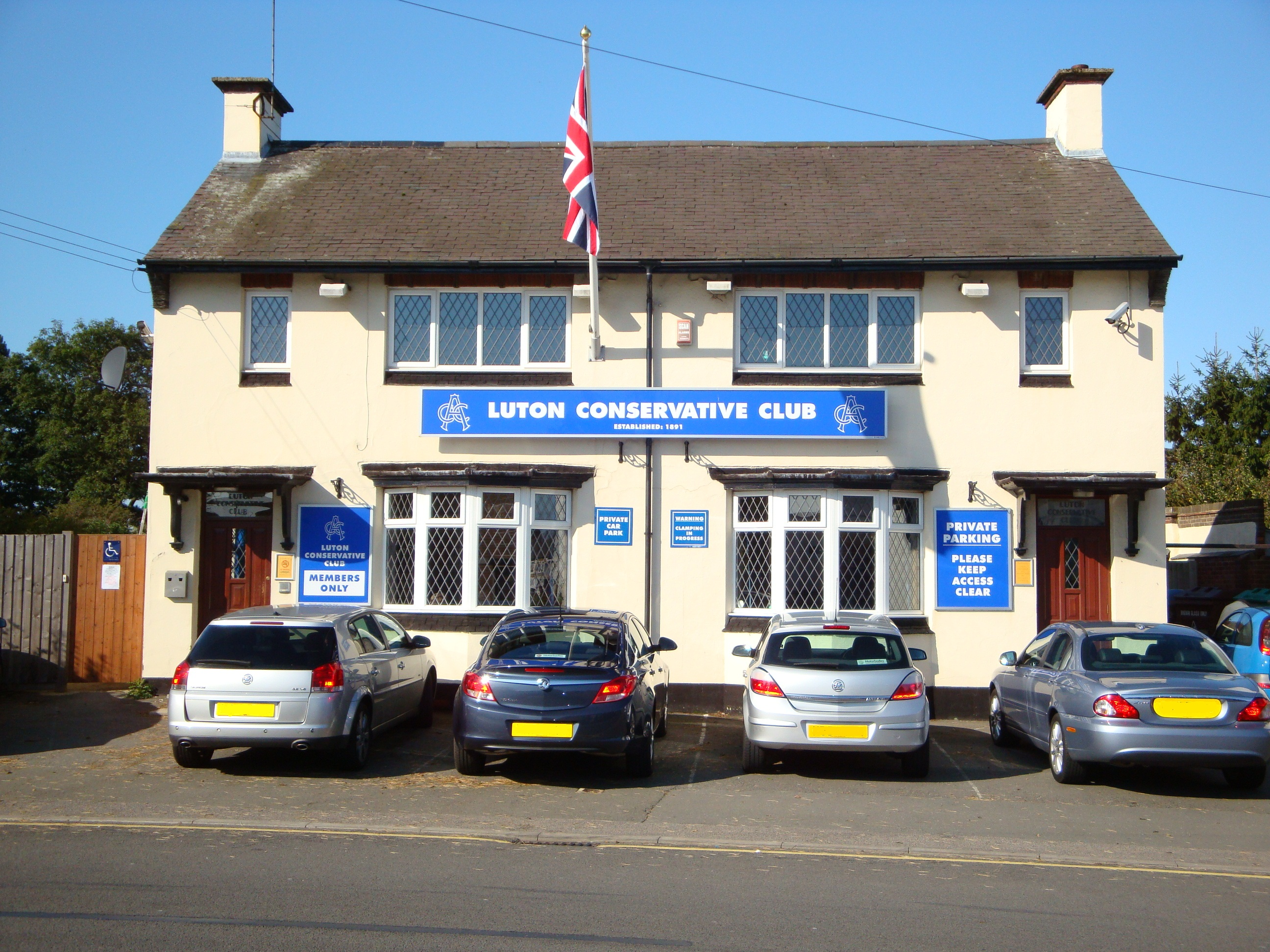
Luton Conservative Club in Stopsley

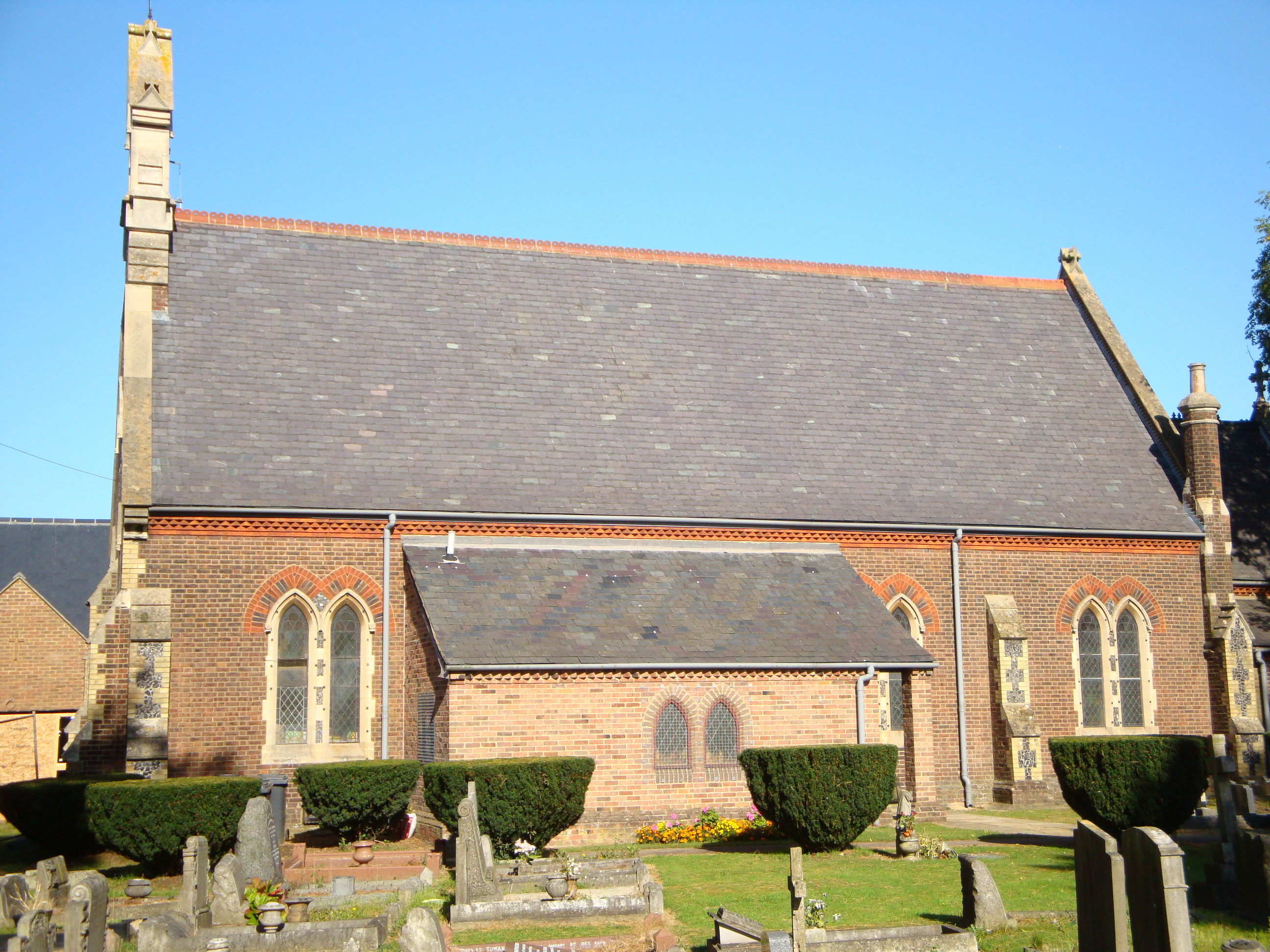
Parish Church of St.Thomas in Stopsley

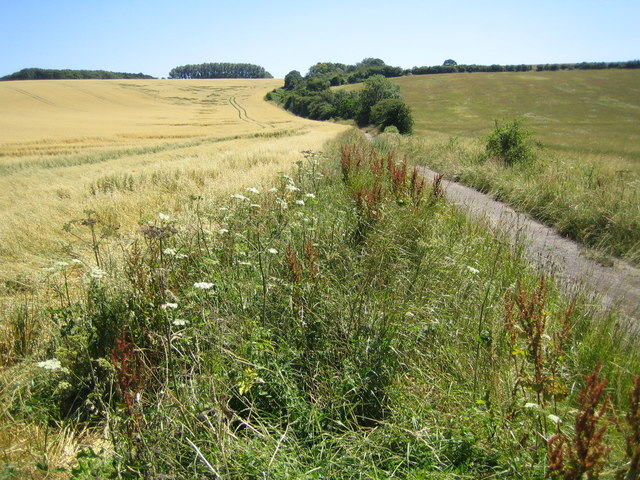
Stopsley Common
