= The Painters Arms, Luton =

Pub in Luton, Bedfordshire, England

Coordinates: 51.8843°N 0.4126°W

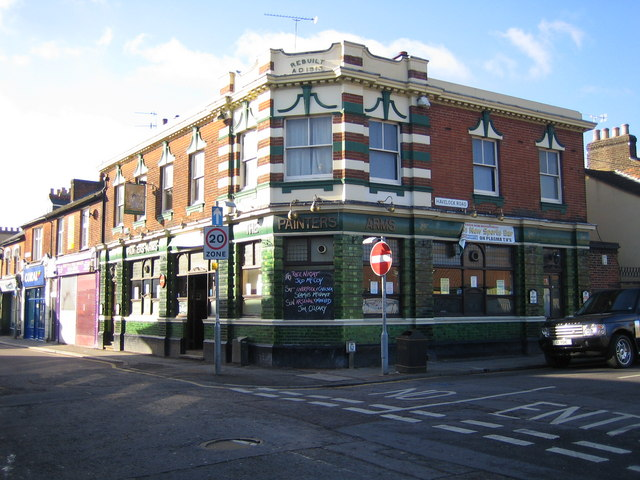
The Painters Arms

The Painters Arms is a Grade II listed pub in Luton, England.

It is on the Campaign for Real Ale's National Inventory of Historic Pub Interiors.

It was rebuilt in 1913.

Seán Ó Roideacháin's poem 'High Town Road' (or 'Baile Ard Luton' in Irish) is about Irish emigrants in The Painters Arms and The Freeholder on High Town Road during the late 1980s.
