= Putteridge Bury =

Country house in Offley, Hertfordshire, England

Coordinates: 51°54′37″N 0°22′26″W

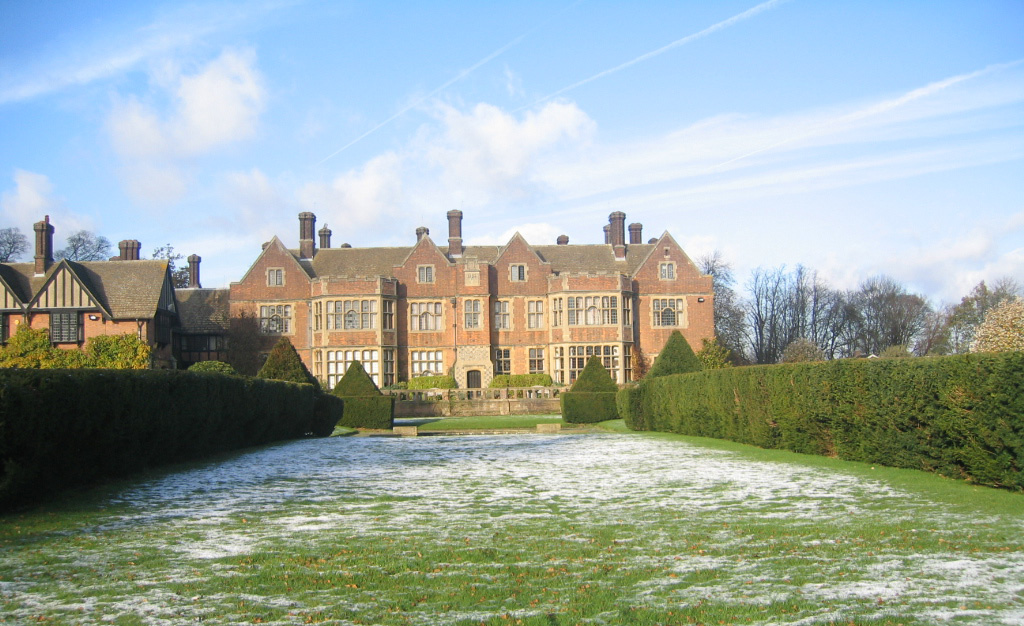
Putteridge Bury

Putteridge Bury is a country house on the edge of the built-up area of Luton, Bedfordshire, England but located just over the county boundary in the parish of Offley in Hertfordshire.

== Mansion ==
The mansion was built in the style of Chequers by architects Sir Ernest George and Alfred Yeats and completed in 1911. The grounds were redesigned by Edwin L Lutyens, soon to be recognised as the foremost architect of the era, and planted by Gertrude Jekyll, one of the first lady Victorian gardeners. Particular features are the reflective pool and massive yew hedges.

Queen Mary and King George V often visited Putteridge Bury with the Prince of Wales and on 1 December 1926 the King planted an oak tree in the lawn to the south of the house. Between the wars, it was owned by Sir Felix Cassel, the Judge Advocate-General to the Forces.

== Park ==
The Putteridge estate is a mixture of arable farmland and woodland; as well as the occasional visiting muntjac and fallow deer, the estate is home to Lady Amherst's pheasant (Chrysolophus amherstiae) as well as the more common pheasant.

== History ==
In 1965 it was acquired by Luton Borough Council and opened as Putteridge Bury College of Education in 1966.

Following Government cutbacks during the 1970s Putteridge Bury ended its brief life as a teacher training centre and was merged with Luton Technical College to become the Luton College of Higher Education, in September 1978.

From 1985 the function rooms were gradually renovated to their original splendour and to conference centre standards.

The unused gymnasium was converted to a learning resources centre.

Luton College of Higher Education became the University of Luton in 1993, and remains University of Bedfordshire property after the merger with the Bedford campus of De Montfort University in August 2006.
