= Stockwood Park =

Urban park in Luton, England

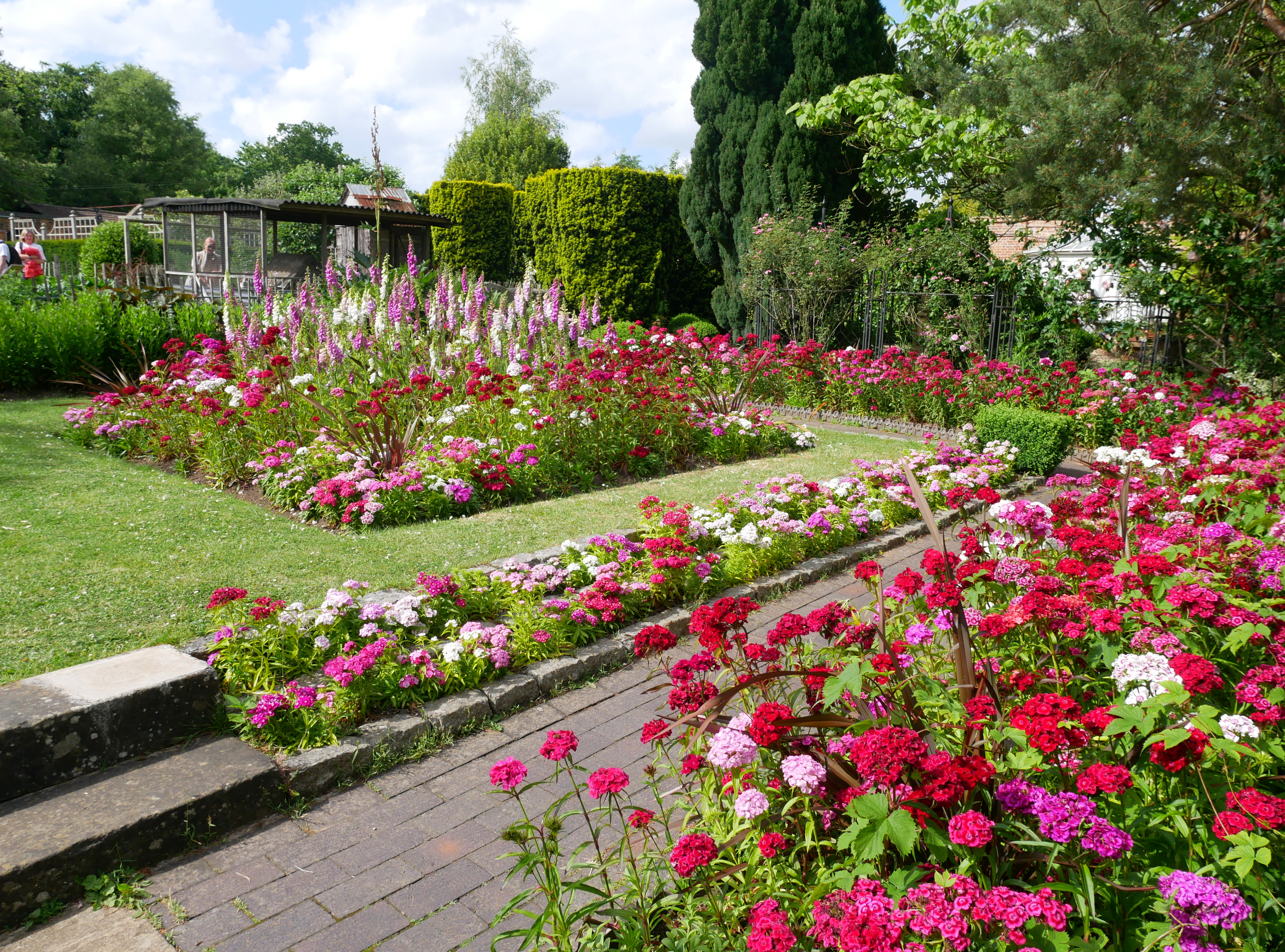
- English cottage garden at Stockwood Park
- Interactive map of Stockwood Park
- Type: public park
- Location: Luton, Bedfordshire; England
- Coordinates: 51.865278°N 0.424722°W
- Area: about 100 hectares (one square kilometre)
- Operator: Luton Borough Council
- Status: Open all year

Stockwood Park is a large urban park in Luton, Bedfordshire, in the Farley Hill estate. With period formal gardens, leading crafts museums, Stockwood Park Rugby Club and extensive golfing facilities, it is about 100 hectares in area.

== Golf Centre ==
Stockwood Park Golf Centre is located in the Bedfordshire countryside just a short drive south of Luton. It features a 18 hole (par 69) course and a 9 hole (par 3) course, along with a Practice Facility and a FootGolf course. The course offers some of the greens in the area, and narrow tree-lined fairways mean accuracy is tested. The course is made up of a mixture of holes making it the perfect challenge for golfers at all levels. Visitors are able to take advantage of competitive 'Pay as you Play' rates, and regular players have the option of season tickets. The golf centre is also home to Stockwood Golf Club who run year-round competitions.

== Museum ==
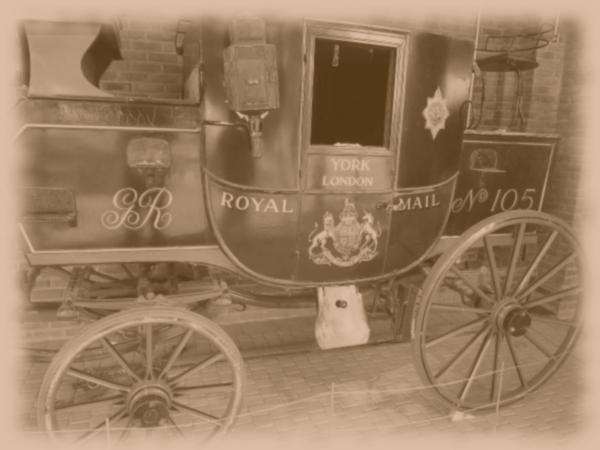
Royal Mail Horse Drawn cart by David Marchant

Stockwood Discovery Centre, in the 18th century stables of the former Stockwood House, has displays of rural crafts and trades. They are representative of life in Bedfordshire before the Industrial Revolution. The collection was amassed by T. W. Bagshawe.

== History ==
The park was originally the estate and grounds to Stockwood House, which was demolished in 1964.

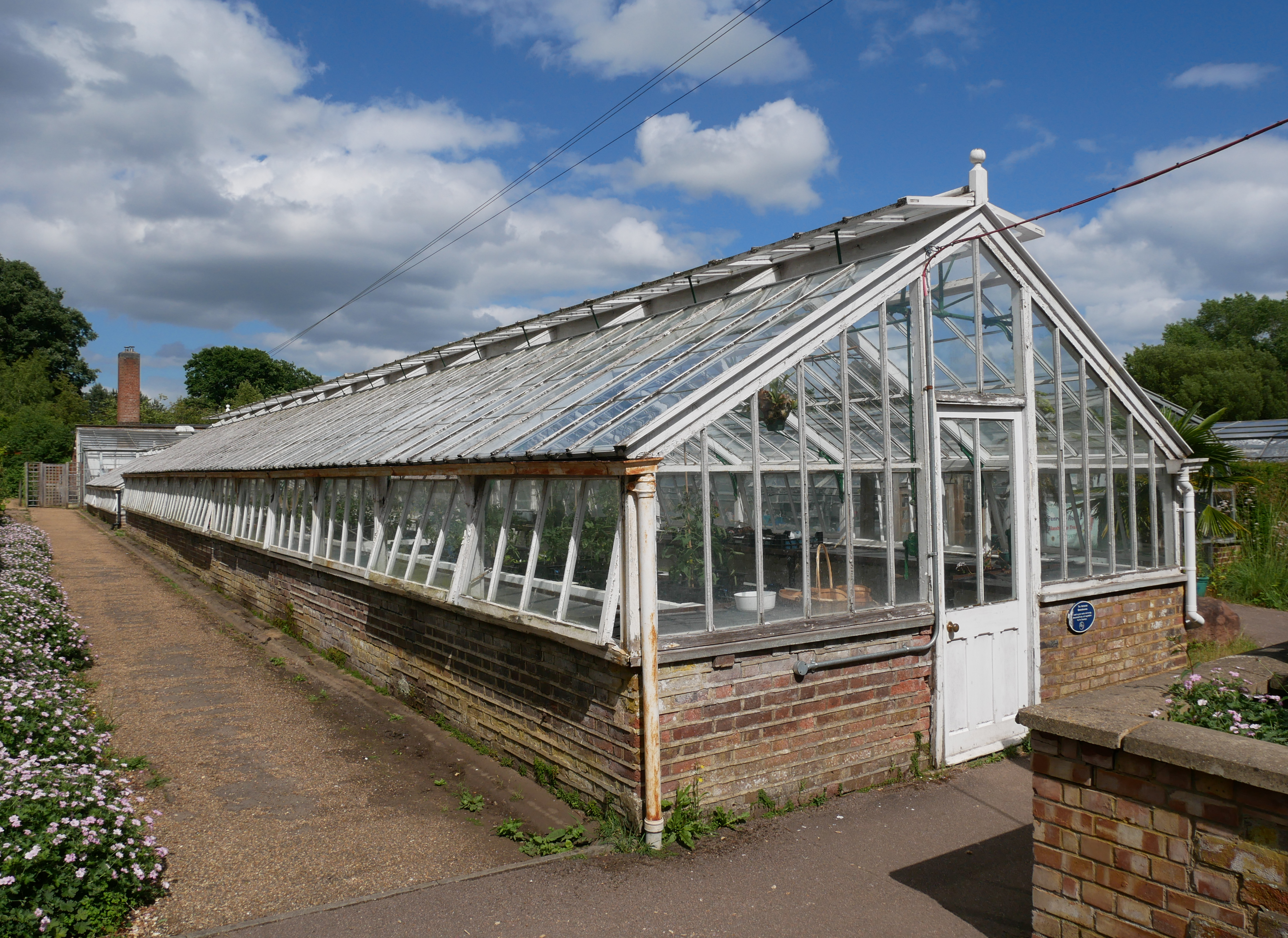
The 19th-century glasshouses at Stockwood Park are now Grade II listed

When Stockwood House was built in 1740 by John Crawley, the grounds were laid out in a fashion befitting one of Bedfordshire’s leading landowners. The enclosed walled gardens provided shelter for growing fruit and vegetables for the house. One of the walled gardens now displays a series of gardens illustrating the changing styles of gardening through the ages.

Soon after the outbreak of World War II, the house was converted to a hospital catering for children suffering with hip diseases. The patients were transferred by converted single deck buses from the Bartholomews Hospital at Swanley in Kent. It was considered to be too dangerous in that area because it was on the edge of the balloon barrage. However Luton saw enemy activity due to the nearby motor works. Initially there was not any X-ray facility there, but one was added later and housed in the stable block. Before that installation, patients were taken by private car to nearby Luton and Dunstable hospital. The house was then named Alexandra Hospital for Children with Hip Disease. The house, in a poor state, was demolished in 1964.

The park is sometimes used by Irish Travellers as a halting site.

== Gardens ==
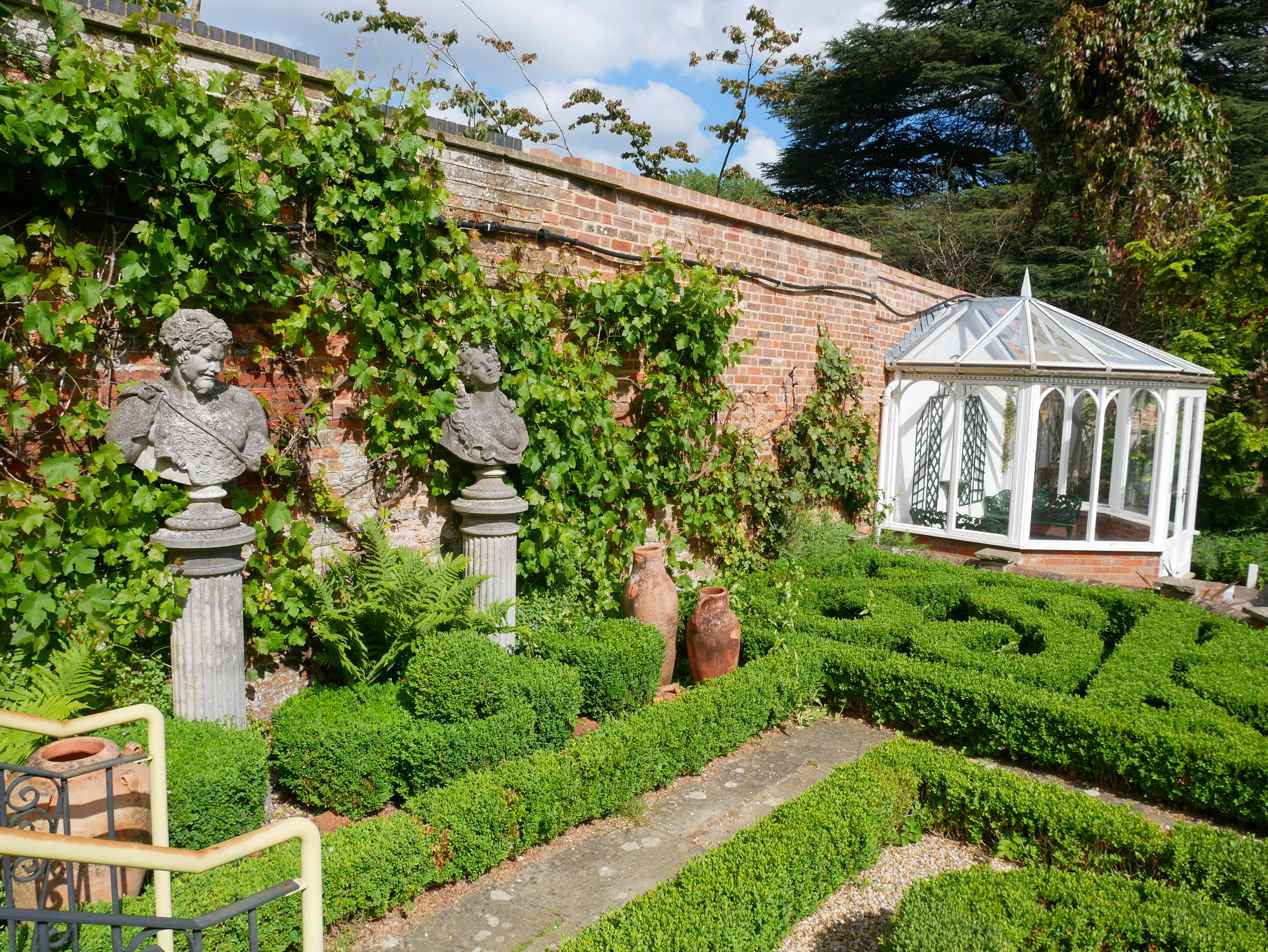
The classical garden at Stockwood Park

The Medieval Garden (12th to 15th century) shows herbs and plants grown for medicinal, cookery and dyeing uses. The 16th-century garden is laid out in a knots, a typical feature of the Elizabethan garden. The knots were planted out with germander, hyssop and box with the open spaces filled with brick dust or crushed shells to contrast the greenery.

Clipped hedges and urns decorate the small formal Dutch garden, replicating those designed by William Kent for Alexander Pope’s garden at Twickenham and the Wilderness Garden at Great Linford Manor.

English 17th-century gardens were heavily influenced by Dutch, French and the Italian styles. The Italian Garden is centered on a well head that once stood in front of Stockwood House.

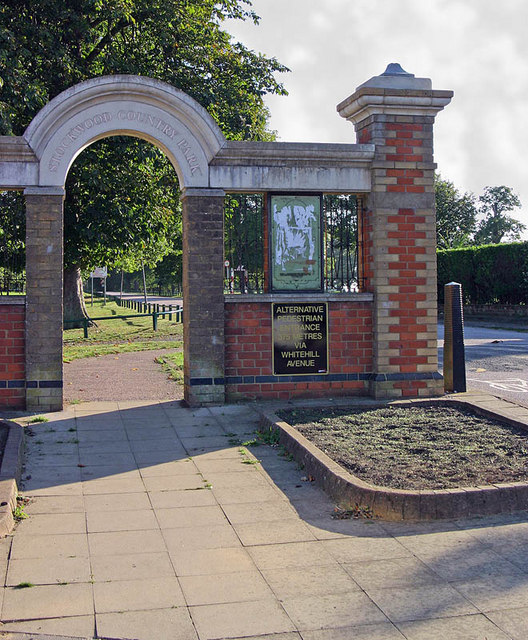
Stockwood Park Entrance, Luton

The Victorian era was a time when plant collectors travelled the world in search of rare and exotic species and styles. Rock gardens and formal flower bedding schemes were also popular, decorated with a bright and showy variety of half-hardy plants. The invention of the practical mowing machine in the 1830s made lawns easier to manage and by 1860 were an essential part of garden equipment.

The Improvement Garden is a classical garden with sculptures full of allusions to ancient Greece and Rome.

== In popular culture ==
Stockwood Park played host to BBC Radio 1's Big Weekend between 24–26 May 2024. Headline acts were Chase and Status on Friday night, Raye on Saturday night, and Coldplay closing the weekend on Sunday night.

Party in the Park is a one-off festival that occurred on 12 September 2026 celebrating 150 years since Luton became a borough. Among the acts that performed were Rickie & Melvin, JW Paris, Olivia Lynn, The Hoosiers, The Feeling, and the headlining Kaiser Chiefs.

== See also ==
- Stockwood Discovery Centre
- Stockwood Park Academy
- Mossman Collection
- Wardown Park
