= List of churches in Luton =

The following is a list of churches in Luton, a unitary authority in Bedfordshire, England.

== Active churches ==
The borough has an estimated 117 churches for 216,800 inhabitants, a ratio of one church to every 1,853 people. This is a higher density than many other recently built urban areas due to the high number of Pentecostal churches in the town (an estimated 52 churches, nearly half of the total number).

Name	Ward	Web	Dedication	Founded	Denomination	Benefice	Notes
St Hugh, Lewsey	Lewsey		Hugh of Lincoln (?)	1959	Church of England		First building 1961. Current building 1967
St Martin de Porres, Luton	Lewsey		Martin de Porres	1962	Roman Catholic		
Lewsey Pentecostal Church	Lewsey				Assemblies of God		
St Luke, Leagrave	Leagrave		Luke	pre-1956	Church of England		Current building 1956
High Street Methodist Church, Leagrave	Leagrave				Methodist	South Beds Methodist Circuit	
Assembly of the First Born, Luton	Leagrave				AFB		Meets in Methodist Church
Christian Pilgrim Church	Leagrave				?		Meets in St Luke's
Luton Tabernacle	Leagrave			2002	?		
Stanton Road Baptist Church	Challney			pre-1954	Baptist Union		Current building 1954. Previously in Derby Road (Note: also runs Hadrian Christian Fellowship in Dunstable, Central Bedfordshire)
Kingsway International Christian Centre	Challney				?		Meets in Challney High School for Girls
St John the Apostle, Luton	Sundon Park		John the Evangelist	1966	Roman Catholic	Holy Family & St John Parish	Merged into Holy Family parish 2001
Sundon Park Baptist Church	Sundon Park				Baptist Union		
Holy Cross, Marsh Farm	Northwell		Cross	1960s	Church of England		Bishop of Richborough. Current building 1976
Holy Family, Luton	Northwell		Holy Family	1960s	Roman Catholic	Holy Family & St John Parish	Current building 1982–1983
Church of God of Prophecy, Luton	Northwell				CGP		
Bramingham Park Church	Bramingham			1980	Baptist Union		Daughter of Limbury Baptist. Current building 1990
St Augustine of Canterbury, Limbury	Limbury		Augustine of Canterbury	pre-1964	Church of England		Current building 1964
Mount Pleasant Methodist Church	Limbury				Methodist	South Beds Methodist Circuit	
Born Again Bibleway Church	Limbury				Bible Way		Meets in Mt Pleasant Methodist Church
Community Church Luton	Limbury			1984	Independent		
Christchurch Christian Centre	Limbury				?		
Pentecostal Apostolic Church of Luton	Limbury				?		Meets in St Augustine's Church
St John's Methodist Church, Barton Road	Icknield				Methodist	South Beds Methodist Circuit	
Birdsfoot Gospel Hall	Icknield				Gospel Hall		
Luton North Seventh-Day Adventist Church	Icknield				7th-Day Adventist		Meets in St John's Methodist Church
Victory Life Chapel Luton	Icknield				RCCG		
Gospel Pentecostal Ministries	Icknield				?		
Holy Trinity, Biscot	Saints		Trinity	1867	Church of England		
St Joseph the Worker, Luton	Saints		Joseph	1937	Roman Catholic		
Limbury Baptist Church	Saints			pre-1917	Baptist Union		
The Olive Tree Church	Saints			pre-1937	Baptist / Methodist		Blenheim Cresc. Baptist & St Margaret's Meth. merged, meeting at latter
Fellowship Baptist Church	Saints			1982	Ind. Baptist		Meets in William Austen Infant School
Selborne Gospel Hall	Saints				Gospel Hall		
Kingdom Builders Family Church	Saints			2006	RCCG		
Christ Divine Bible Church	Saints				?		
Grace Springs Church	Saints				?		Meets in Saints Community Centre
New Covenant Church Luton	Saints				?		
Christchurch, Bushmead	Barnfield		Jesus	1992	Church of England		New Wine. Current building 2003
St Peter, Luton	Dallow		Peter	pre-1964	Church of England	All Saints w St Peter	Original building closed in 1964. Current building 1972
All Saints, Luton	Dallow		All Saints	1907	Church of England	All Saints w St Peter	Current building 1923
Beech Hill Methodist Church	Dallow			1908	Methodist	South Beds Methodist Circuit	Current building 1933–1934
Oakdale Methodist Church	Dallow				Methodist	South Beds Methodist Circuit	
Beulah Apostolic Church	Dallow						
Mountain of Fire & Miracles Ministries	Dallow				MOFAM		Meets in Dallow Primary School
Restoration Revival Fellowship, Luton	Dallow				RRF		
Asian Christian Fellowship, Luton	Dallow				?		Meets in Beech Hill Methodist Church. Services in Punjabi
First Born Church of the Living God	Dallow				?		Meets in Oakdale Methodist
Vision Gospel Church	Dallow				?		
St Andrew, Luton	Biscot		Andrew	1932	Church of England		
The Holy Ghost, Luton	Biscot		Holy Spirit	1964–1965	Roman Catholic		
Bury Park United Reformed Church	Biscot				United Reformed		
German Lutheran Congregation	Biscot				Lutheran		Meets in St Andrew's
Calvary Church of God in Christ, Luton	Biscot				COGIC		
AIRS Ministry Church	Biscot				?		
St John the Baptist, Farley Hill	Farley		John the Baptist	pre-1969	Church of England		New Wine. Current building 1969
St Saviour, Luton	Farley		Jesus	1897	Church of England		Bishop of Richborough
St Margaret of Scotland, Luton	Farley		Margaret of Scotland	1946	Roman Catholic		
Farley Hill Methodist Church	Farley				Methodist	South Beds Methodist Circuit	
New Life Assembly Luton	Farley				RCCG		
Grace Communion Church, Luton	Farley				Grace Communion		Meets in Farley Hill Methodist
Shepherd's Voice Ministries, Luton	Farley				Shepherd's Voice		
St Paul, Luton	South		Paul		Church of England		Current building 1991
St Mary, Luton	South		Mary	Medieval	Church of England		
Our Lady Help of Christians, Luton	South		Mary	1884	Roman Catholic		Current building 1910
Ukrainian Greek Catholic Church	South				Ukrainian Greek Cath.		
Central Baptist Church, Luton	South				Baptist Union		
Bethel Strict Baptist Chapel, Luton	South			1873	Gospel Standard		Current building 1906
Strathmore Avenue Methodist Church	South			1972	Methodist	South Beds Methodist Circuit	
Luton Salvation Army	South				Salvation Army		
Luton Christian Fellowship	South			2013	Elim		Planted from Elim Stevenage
RCCG Victory Centre for All Nations	South			2000	RCCG		
Apostolic Faith Mission Luton Assembly	South				Apost. Faith Mission		
New Covenant Fellowship Church	South				Avada Churches		
Luton Chinese Christian Church	South			pre-1994	Chinese Overseas Miss.		
Christ Apostolic Church New Testament Assembly	South			2005	Christ Apostolic		
New Testament Church of God, Luton	South				NTCG		
Potter's House Christian Fellowship Church	South				Potter's House		
United Church of the Kingdom of God	South				UCKG		
Victorious Pentecostal Assembly Luton	South				VPA		
Word of Faith Centre	South			1988	Apostolic Church		
United Pentecostal Church of God	South				?		Meets in Strathmore Avenue Methodist
City Life Church Luton	South				?		
True Vine Fellowship	South			1997	?		
Four Winds Church of God Ministries	South				?		
Gatehouse Apostolic Ministries International aka Kingdom Arena	South			2006	Pentecostal & Charismatic leanings		Meets at 6-8 Union Street, Luton LU1 3AN
Lighthouse Christian Centre Luton	South				?		Meets in Park Town Community Centre
Revelation Christian Centre	South				?		
Rivers of Life	South				?		
Watersprings Christian Centre	South				?		
True Word Shabbat Assembly	South				?		
St Matthew, High Town	High Town		Matthew	1875	Church of England		
Hightown Baptist Church	High Town			1906	Ind. Baptist		Current building 1913
High Town Methodist Church	High Town				Methodist	South Beds Methodist Circuit	
St Ninian's United Reformed Church	High Town		Ninian		United Reformed		
Luton Central Seventh-Day Adventist Ch.	High Town				7th-Day Adventist		
Hope Church Luton	High Town			2002	Newfrontiers		
Christ Apostolic Church East of Luton	High Town			2017	Christ Apostolic		
Journey Church	High Town				?		Meets in St Matthew's
Haven of Glory Church	High Town			2014	?		Nigerian
Luton Pentecostal Church	High Town				?		
Celestial Church of Christ St-Emmanuel	High Town				?		
Five Talent Church International	High Town			2001	?		
Lighthouse Chapel International	High Town				?		Meets in Hightown Community Centre
Luton Worship Centre Church	High Town				?		
St Christopher, Luton	Round Green		Christopher	1914	Church of England	St Anne w St Christopher	St John's until 1936
St Anne, Luton	Round Green		Anne	1937	Church of England	St Anne w St Christopher	
Luton International Church	Round Green			c. 1993	?		Meets in Ashcroft School
St Thomas, Stopsley	Stopsley		Thomas	1862	Church of England		
Sacred Heart of Jesus, Luton	Stopsley		Sacred Heart	1946	Roman Catholic		Current building 1950
Stopsley Baptist Church	Stopsley				Baptist Union		
Cornerstone Church, Luton	Stopsley			2011	FIEC		Meets in Putteridge High School
RCCG Strong Tower Stopsley	Stopsley			c. 2015	RCCG		
St Francis, Luton	Crawley		Francis of Assisi	1959–1960	Church of England		Benefice also includes Cockernhoe in Hertfordshire
Luton Quaker Meeting	Crawley				Quakers		
Luton Messianic Fellowship	Crawley				?		Meets in Quaker Meeting House
Ramridge Baptist Church	Wigmore			1954	Baptist Union		
Wigmore Church	Wigmore			1980s	Methodist / URC		Roots in King St Congreg. Church, Luton (1864–1965)
