= Luton Borough Council =

Local council of Luton, England

- Council logo

Type
- Type: Unitary authority

Leadership
- Mayor: Javed Hussain, Labour since 19 May 2026
- Leader: Amjid Ali, Liberal Democrats since 14 September 2026
- Chief Executive: Mark Fowler since 16 July 2025

Structure
- Seats: 48 councillors
- Graph of the party split among 48 seats.
- Political groups: Administration (23) Liberal Democrats (13) Conservative (3) Independent (7) Other parties (25) Labour (21) Reform (1) Independent (3)
- Length of term: 4 years

Elections
- Last election: 4 May 2023
- Next election: 6 May 2027

Meeting place
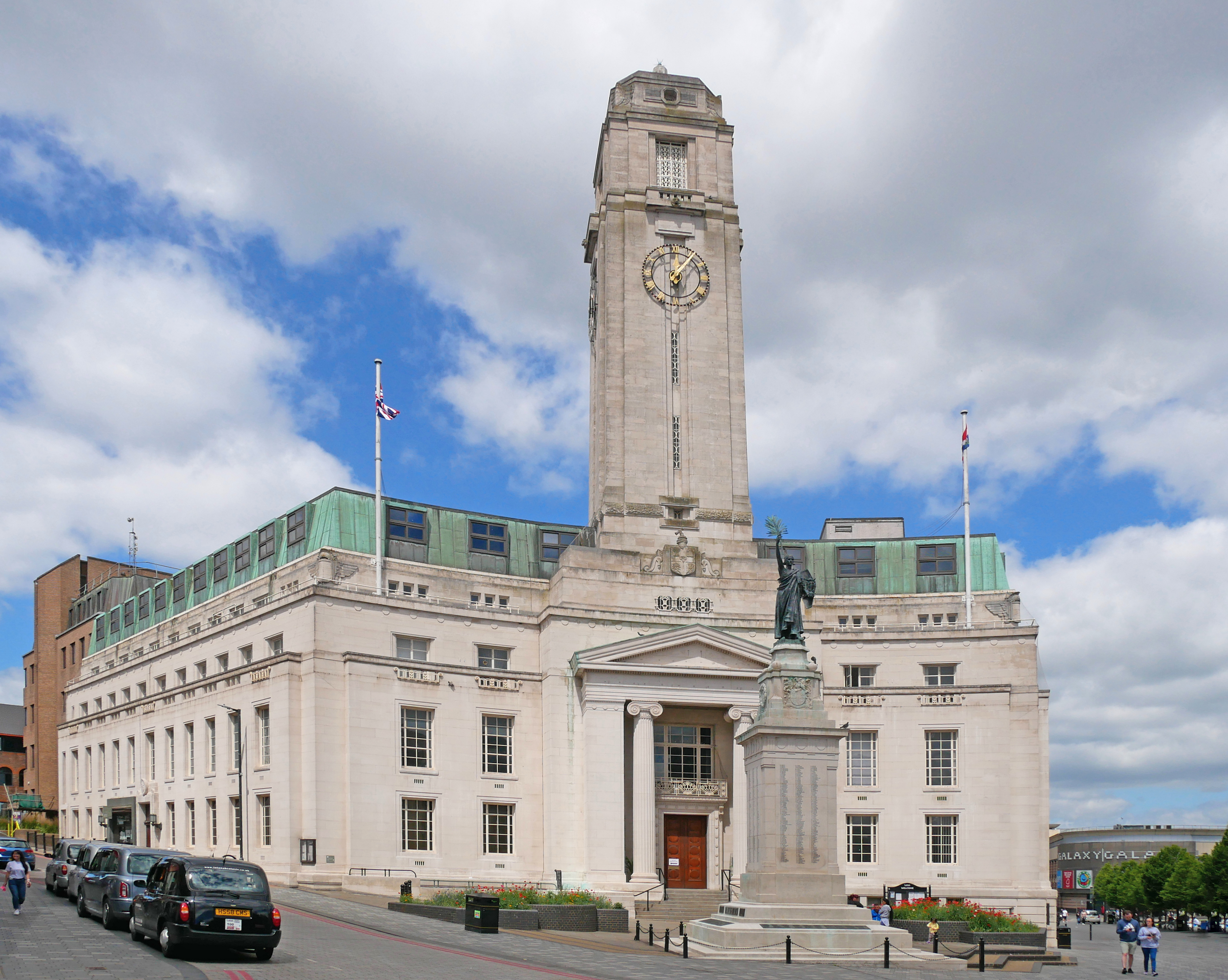
- Town Hall, George Street, Luton, LU1 2BQ

Website
- www.luton.gov.uk

Luton Borough Council, also known as Luton Council, is the local authority of Luton, in the ceremonial county of Bedfordshire, England. Luton has had an elected local authority since 1850, which has been reformed several times. Since 1997 the council has been a unitary authority, being a district council which also performs the functions of a county council.

The council went under no overall control in July 2026, having previously been under Labour majority control since 2007. A coalition of the Liberal Democrats, Conservatives and some of the independent councillors subsequently formed in September 2026 to run the council. It is based at Luton Town Hall.

== History ==
Luton's first elected local authority was a local board established in 1850, prior to which the town had been administered by the parish vestry. The town became a municipal borough in 1876 governed by a body formally called the 'mayor, aldermen and burgesses of the borough of Luton', generally known as the corporation, town council or borough council.

In 1964 the borough was elevated to county borough status, which saw the council take over county-level functions from Bedfordshire County Council.

On 1 April 1974, under the Local Government Act 1972, the county borough was reconstituted as a non-metropolitan district. Between 1974 and 1997 Luton was a lower-tier district council, with Bedfordshire County Council again providing county-level services to the town.

In 1997, Luton Borough Council regained responsibility for county-level services from Bedfordshire County Council. The way this change was implemented was to create a new non-metropolitan county of Luton covering the same area as the existing borough, but with no separate county council; instead the existing borough council took on county functions, making it a unitary authority. This therefore restored the borough council to the powers it had held when Luton was a county borough prior to 1974. Luton remains part of the ceremonial county of Bedfordshire for the purposes of lieutenancy.

== Governance ==
Luton Borough Council provides all local government services in the area. As a unitary authority it provides both county-level and district-level services. There are no civil parishes in the borough.

=== Political control ===
The council went under no overall control in July 2026, when six councillors left Labour to sit as independents, depriving Labour of the majority it had held since 2007. A coalition of the Liberal Democrats, Conservatives and some of the independent councillors subsequently formed a new administration in September 2026, led by Liberal Democrat councillor Amjid Ali.

Political control of the council since the 1974 reforms has been as follows:

Lower-tier non-metropolitan district

Party in control	Years
Labour	1974–1976
Conservative	1976–1991
Labour	1991–1997

Unitary authority

Party in control	Years
Labour	1997–2003
No overall control	2003–2007
Labour	2007–2026
No overall control	2026–present

=== Leadership ===
The role of mayor is largely ceremonial in Luton, with political leadership instead provided by the leader of the council. The leaders since 1976 have been:

Councillor	Party	From	To
Viv Dunington	Conservative	1976	May 1991
Roy Davis	Labour	May 1991	May 1999
Bill McKenzie	Labour	May 1999	May 2003
David Franks	Liberal Democrats	22 May 2003	May 2007
Hazel Simmons	Labour	22 May 2007	19 May 2026
Tahmina Saleem	Labour	19 May 2026	14 Sep 2026
Amjid Ali	Liberal Democrats	14 Sep 2026	

=== Composition ===
Following the 2023 election and subsequent changes of allegiance and by-elections up to July 2026, the composition of the council was:

Party	Seats
Labour	21
Liberal Democrats	13
Conservative	3
Reform	1
Independent	10
Total	48

Seven of the independent councillors sit together as the "Independent Alliance Group", which forms part of the council's administration with the Liberal Democrats and Conservatives. The other three independents are not aligned to a group. The next election is due in 2027.

== Elections ==
Elections are held every four years. Since the last boundary changes in 2023 there have been 48 councillors elected from 20 wards.

=== Wards ===
- Barnfield
- Beech Hill
- Biscot
- Bramingham
- Central
- Challney
- Dallow
- Farley
- High Town
- Leagrave
- Lewsey
- Northwell
- Poets
- Round Green
- Saints
- South
- Stopsley
- Sundon Park
- Vauxhall
- Wigmore

== Premises ==
The council is based at Luton Town Hall at the head of George Street, the town centre's main street. The current building was completed in 1936, replacing an earlier town hall of 1847 on the same site. The earlier building had been destroyed in a fire in 1919 in the town's "Peace Riot" which followed the formal proclamation of peace at the end of the First World War.

== NHS ==
In July 2017 it decided to merge its health commissioning budget with the local Clinical Commissioning Group, establishing an integrated commissioning committee. It is one of the first areas which the NHS has designated an Accountable care system.

== Arms ==
Coat of arms of Luton Borough Council

Notes
Originally granted on 25 July 1876, transferred by order in council on 21 May 1974.
Crest
On a wreath of the colours upon a mount Vert a cubit Arm in bend vested Azure cuff Argent the hand proper holding seven ears of wheat Or.
Escutcheon
Quarterly Gules and Azure on a cross Argent between a garb in the first quarter a bee-hive in the second a rose slipped and leaved in the third and a thistle also slipped and leaved in the fourth all proper a bee volant of the last.

== See also ==
- Politics in Luton
