= Icknield =

Electoral ward of Luton, England

Coordinates: 51.913°N 0.426°W

- Location within Bedfordshire
- Population: 7,556 (est.).
- OS grid reference: TL082250
- Unitary authority: Luton
- Ceremonial county: Bedfordshire
- Region: East
- Country: England
- Sovereign state: United Kingdom
- Post town: LUTON
- Postcode district: LU3
- Dialling code: 01582
- Police: Bedfordshire
- Fire: Bedfordshire
- Ambulance: East of England
- UK Parliament: Luton North

Icknield is a parliamentary ward, of the Luton district, in the town of Luton, Bedfordshire, England. The ward takes its name from the Icknield Way, a pre-Roman road which passes through Luton. Situated towards the northeast of Luton, the ward is made up of parts of Runfold and Warden Hill, as well as Bushmead.

== Politics ==
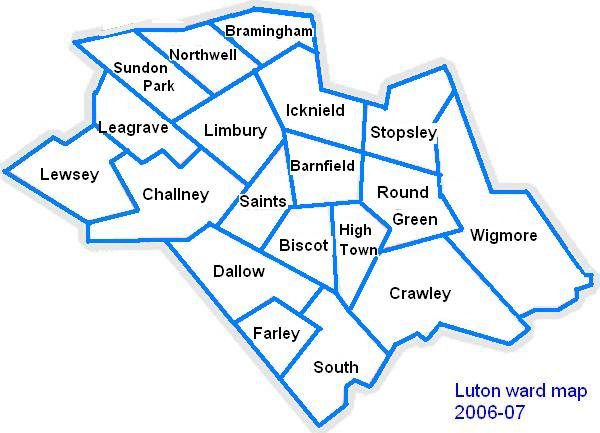
Map of Luton showing Icknield

Icknield ward is represented by Cllr Asif Masood (Labour) and Cllr Jeff Petts (Conservative).

The ward forms part of the parliamentary constituency of Luton North and the MP is Sarah Owen (Labour).

== Local attractions ==
Key
	Abbey/Priory/Cathedral
Accessible open space	Accessible open space
	Amusement/Theme Park
	Castle
Country Park	Country Park
	English Heritage
	Forestry Commission
Heritage railway	Heritage railway
Historic house	Historic House
Places of Worship	Places of Worship
Museum (free) Museum	Museum (free/not free)
National Trust	National Trust
	Theatre
	Zoo

- Dunstable Downs
- Chiltern Hills
- Leagrave Park
- Leighton Buzzard Light Railway
- Luton Museum & Art Gallery
- the hat Factory
- Luton Hoo
- Mossman Collection
- Someries castle
- Stockwood Craft Museum
- Stockwood Park
- Wardown Park
- Waulud's Bank
- Whipsnade Tree Cathedral
- Whipsnade Wildlife Park
- Woodside Farm and Wildfowl Park
- Wrest Park Gardens
