= Bury Park =

Area of Luton, England

Coordinates: 51.885°N 0.431°W

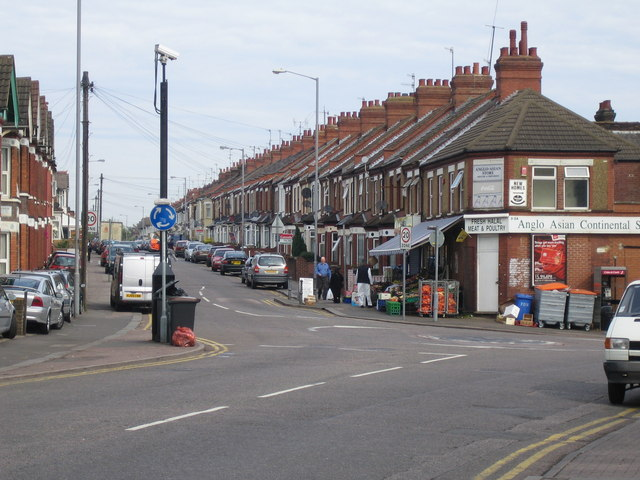
- Selbourne Road & Leagrave Road, Bury Park

- Location within Bedfordshire
- Population: Within Biscot and Dallow wards
- OS grid reference: TL0821
- Unitary authority: Luton
- Ceremonial county: Bedfordshire
- Region: East
- Country: England
- Sovereign state: United Kingdom
- Post town: LUTON
- Postcode district: LU1, LU4
- Dialling code: 01582
- Police: Bedfordshire
- Fire: Bedfordshire
- Ambulance: East of England
- UK Parliament: Luton South

Bury Park is an area of Luton, Bedfordshire, England. It is located 1 mile north west of the town centre on the A505 road to Dunstable. The area is roughly bounded by Claremont Road and Highfield Road to the north, Telford Way to the south, Hatters Way to the west, and the Midland Main Line to the east.

Since the mid-1970s a large Muslim community have settled. Bury Park has a large commercial area specialising in fruit, vegetables, tech shops and all cultural clothing. There is a significant number of restaurants in the area, particularly serving Halal food.

Kenilworth Road, the home of Luton Town F.C. is also located here.

== History ==
Bury Park takes its name from Bury Farm, which was situated near to where Kenilworth Road is now.

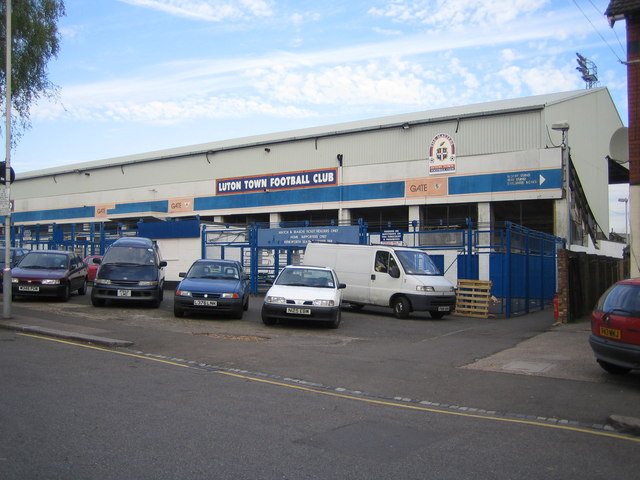
The Stadium from Kenilworth Road

An estate was erected on the fields of the farm, and the first houses were occupied in 1882. Church school halls were opened in 1895, Bury Park Congregational Church was built in 1903, and Luton Industrial Co-operative Society Ltd opened a general store at the junction of Dunstable Road and Leagrave Road in 1906. From 1897, Luton Town played home games at their Dunstable Road ground, a flat field that later became the site of the Odeon cinema, before they moved in 1905 to the Kenilworth Road ground. The Church of England built a mission room in 1907 to serve the growing population on the west side of Luton, and the new church of All Saints was opened on Shaftesbury Road in 1923. Dunstable Road was lined with Victorian houses, each with a neatly fenced garden, but the character of the road altered with the coming of the trams in 1908; the houses were turned into shops, and their front gardens became paved forecourts. By 1926, the shops included a "High-Class Pastry Cook and Confectioner" at 273 Dunstable Road.

Traffic has long been a problem in the area. In 1926, complaints were made that horses and carts were causing obstructions by stopping at a water trough at the junction of Dunstable Road and Leagrave Road. In the following years the junction was covered by constables on point duty.

Edgar Barber established an aeroplane propeller factory during World War I at 116 Bury Park Road. This was converted into a cinema called the Empire, which opened in 1921 and which closed in 1938 when the new Odeon opened on Dunstable Road. The Odeon with 1958 seats was designed by Keith P. Roberts and is now a listed building.

During World War II the old Empire was requisitioned for "government purposes". After the war it was used as a synagogue, and then later as an Islamic centre. The Odeon was used for music concerts as well as for showing films; The Beatles played there in 1963. It eventually closed in 1983 and re-opened as a Top Rank Bingo Club. After local objections when its name changed to Mecca Bingo, it finally closed in 1999 and became a church.

== Churches and mosques ==
The Congregational Church in Waldeck Road was a United Reformed Church until July 7 2023. Since then, the neighbouring mosque, Bury Park Jamie Masjid, has purchased the church through a huge effort within the Muslim community in Luton, led by Late Haji Abul Hussain. It is now used for events and other activities hosted by the mosque. The converted cinema in Dunstable Road is now the UK headquarters of the Calvary Church of God in Christ pastored by Jurisdictional Bishop, Rev Dr. Alvin Blake.

The Luton skyline includes the Luton Central Mosque in Westbourne Road, foundations of which were laid by the late Waliat Hussain Jarral (also alternatively known as Walayat) in 1982. Born in Kashmir, the founder died aged 72, on 24 June 2010 after a battle with cancer. But his legacy remains, as having founded one of the first purpose-built mosques in Britain and the biggest purpose built in modern Europe in the early 1980s. A dispute over who should run the mosque led to a highly publicised High Court battle.

The more recent Islamic Centre in Bury Park Road also serves the Islamic community in Luton and occupies the former synagogue.

== Politics ==
The area north of Dunstable Road is in Biscot ward and the area to the south is in Dallow ward.

The wards form part of the parliamentary constituency of Luton South and the MP is Rachel Hopkins (Labour).

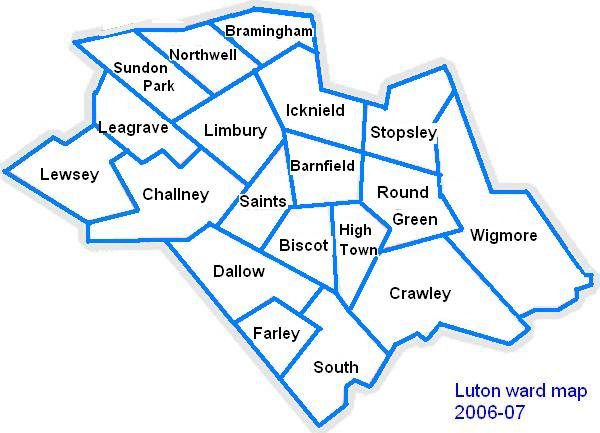
Map of Luton wards

== Local attractions ==
Key
| | Abbey/Priory/Cathedral |
| Accessible open space | Accessible open space |
| | Amusement/Theme Park |
| | Castle |
| Country Park | Country Park |
| | English Heritage |
| | Forestry Commission |
| Heritage railway | Heritage railway |
| Historic house | Historic House |
| Places of Worship | Places of Worship |
| Museum (free) Museum | Museum (free/not free) |
| National Trust | National Trust |
| | Theatre |
| | Zoo |

- Dunstable Downs
- Chiltern Hills
- Leagrave Park
- Leighton Buzzard Light Railway
- Luton Museum & Art Gallery
- the hat Factory
- Luton Hoo
- Mossman Collection
- Someries Castle
- Stockwood Craft Museum
- Stockwood Park
- Wardown Park
- Waulud's Bank
- Whipsnade Tree Cathedral
- Whipsnade Wildlife Park
- Woodside Farm and Wildfowl Park
- Wrest Park Gardens

== Local newspapers ==
Two weekly newspapers cover Bury Park, although they are not specific to the area.

They are the:

- Herald and Post
- Luton News
