= Limbury =

Suburb of Luton, England

Coordinates: 51.909°N 0.447°W

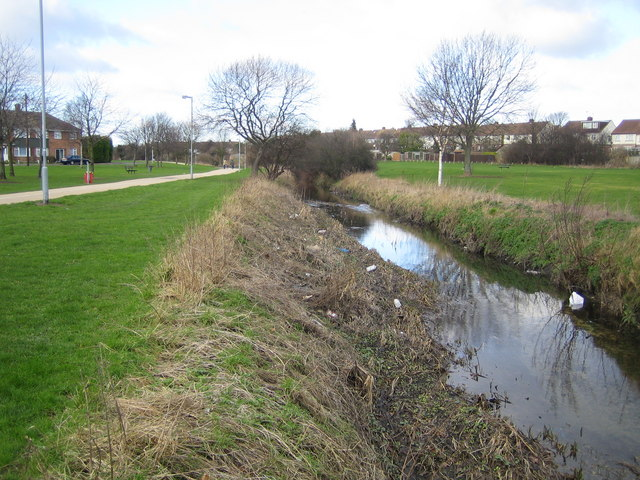
- River Lee in Limbury

- Location within Bedfordshire
- Population: 8,390; 7,904 (2011 Census. Ward) (for Limbury ward, which also includes part of Runfold, and does not include parts of Limbury in Saints ward
- OS grid reference: TL0624
- Unitary authority: Luton
- Ceremonial county: Bedfordshire
- Region: East
- Country: England
- Sovereign state: United Kingdom
- Post town: Luton
- Postcode district: LU3
- Dialling code: 01582
- Police: Bedfordshire
- Fire: Bedfordshire
- Ambulance: East of England
- UK Parliament: Luton North

Limbury is a suburb of Luton, in the Luton district, in the ceremonial county of Bedfordshire, England, and was formerly a village before Luton expanded around it. The area is roughly bounded by Bramingham Road to the north, Marsh Road to the south, Bramingham Road to the west, and Catsbrook Road, Runfold Avenue, Grosvenor Road, Bancroft Road and Blundell Road to the east.

== Etymology ==
A place called Lygeanburgh near Waulud’s Bank (which is in nearby Leagrave) was one of four settlements mentioned in the Anglo-Saxon Chronicle captured by Cuthwulf, (Prince of Wessex) in 571. Lygeanburgh and Limbury were almost certainly the same place, but so far there has been no excavated evidence to link them directly. Lygeanburgh meant a fortified place on the river Lea.

== History ==
The Icknield Way, a Roman road, passes through Limbury. Local road names give away its location: the road is called as 'Icknield Road' as it enters Limbury from Leagrave, then eventually the road continues on as Icknield Way.

In the thirteenth century, Limbury lay in Flitt Hundred, which was under the control of the manor of Luton.

The villages of Limbury and Leagrave were formed into the ecclesiastical parish of Holy Trinity, Biscot, in 1866. On 1 April 1896, under the provisions of the Local Government Act 1894, they became separate civil parishes from Luton Rural, Limbury and Biscot becoming the parish of Limbury-cum-Biscot.

At the end of the nineteenth century, Limbury was a small hamlet approximately two miles from Luton, near Leagrave village. At that time it consisted of just a few cottages and just two farms.

Moated houses still existed in around Limbury at the beginning of the 20th century. The Moat House (which was originally just outside Limbury, and is now part of the neighbouring suburb of Saints) is the only one remaining (now a pub/restaurant). It is reputed to be the oldest secular building in South Bedfordshire. In 2007 the Moat House had the roof rethatched.

In the early part of the 20th century, Luton was rapidly changing from a hat manufacturing town to one relying mainly on engineering. New factories were being built in the town as well as the existing ones expanding, mainly in the motor industry (Vauxhall moved to Luton in 1905). This meant more workers were needed, many of whom were housed in Limbury. Hedges and the rural landscape fast disappeared in Limbury as new housing developments replaced them.

With the increased number of workers a new Baptist church was built in 1906. It was built by Arthur Cole, who had signed a contract the previous August 1905 with the church that included the line, 'I... agree to build a chapel (at Limbury)... and (it) shall be finished in every particular so that the opening services may be held on Good Friday, 1906.'

In 1921 the parish had a population of 1534. On 1 October 1928, the civil parish was abolished, with the urbanised area being annexed to Luton, and the remaining part being split three-ways between Stopsley, Streatley and Sundon parishes.

Further expansion of Limbury came in the 1950s when it expanded north of the River Lea, building on fields known as “Limbury Mead”, a term which is still used locally to refer to north Limbury.

== Local area ==
At the centre of the original village of Limbury are Limbury Baptist Church, a small parade of shops on Neville Road, and The Black Swan pub on Black Swan Lane. On Gardenia Avenue is St. Joseph's Roman Catholic Church, built in the 20th century to serve Limbury's growing Irish Catholic population, as well as the neighbouring St. Joseph's R.C. Primary School (until 2014 two separate schools, an infants and a juniors school). There are two other schools in the area, Norton Road Primary School and The Meads Primary School.

The main shopping area is now centred on Limbury Mead Square at the junction of Watermead Road and Calverton Road.

There are large open spaces in Limbury following the path of the River Lea.

== Geography ==
Limbury is in the north of Luton, roughly 3 miles from the town centre. Neighbouring areas are Marsh Farm and Bramingham to the north, Saints to the south, Leagrave to the west, and Runfold to the east.

The River Lea runs west to east through the middle of the area. Limbury is fairly flat apart from a small gradient from the river up to the central Limbury.

== Politics ==
Limbury is part of the larger Limbury ward, which also includes part of Runfold, as well as the south eastern tip over spilling into the Saints ward. The ward is represented by Cllr Amy Nicholls (Labour) and Cllr Robert Roche (Labour).

The ward forms part of the parliamentary constituency of Luton North and the MP is Sarah Owen (Labour).

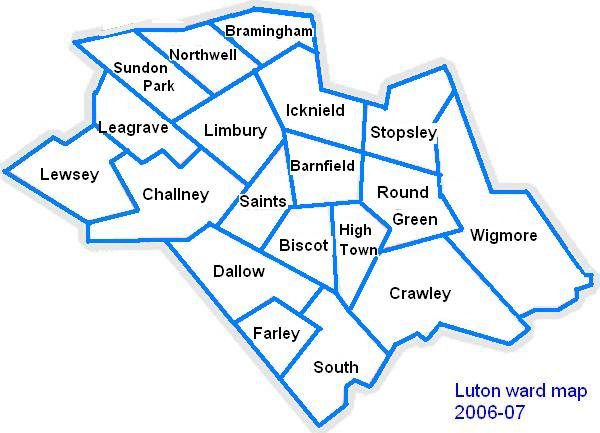
Map of Luton showing Limbury

== Local attractions ==
Key
	Abbey/Priory/Cathedral
Accessible open space	Accessible open space
	Amusement/Theme Park
	Castle
Country Park	Country Park
	English Heritage
	Forestry Commission
Heritage railway	Heritage railway
Historic house	Historic House
Places of Worship	Places of Worship
Museum (free) Museum	Museum (free/not free)
National Trust	National Trust
	Theatre
	Zoo

- Chiltern Hills
- Dunstable Downs
- The Hat Factory
- Leagrave Park
- Leighton Buzzard Light Railway
- Luton Hoo
- Luton Museum & Art Gallery
- Mossman Collection
- Someries castle
- Stockwood Craft Museum
- Stockwood Park
- Wardown Park
- Waulud's Bank
- Whipsnade Tree Cathedral
- Whipsnade Wildlife Park
- Woodside Farm and Wildfowl Park
- Wrest Park Gardens

== Local newspapers ==
Two weekly newspapers cover Limbury, although they are not specific to the area.

- Herald and Post
- Luton News
