= Bushmead =

Suburb of Luton, England

Coordinates: 51.906°N 0.415°W

- Location within Bedfordshire
- Population: Within Barnfield Ward
- OS grid reference: TL091242
- Unitary authority: Central Bedfordshire, Luton
- Ceremonial county: Bedfordshire
- Region: East
- Country: England
- Sovereign state: United Kingdom
- Post town: LUTON
- Postcode district: LU2, LU3
- Dialling code: 01582
- Police: Bedfordshire
- Fire: Bedfordshire
- Ambulance: East of England
- UK Parliament: Luton North

Bushmead is a suburb of Luton, Bedfordshire, England, situated in the north of the town. The area is roughly bounded by Weybourne Drive to the north, Bradgers Hill Road to the south, Old Bedford Road to the west, and Bradgers Hill and Stopsley Common to the east.

== History ==
Much of the area was once land belonging to Stopsley Common Farm. The farmhouse was built by the Putteridge Estate around 1870, and still stands on Bushmead Road.

== Local Area ==
The area is mainly residential, with a few educational institutes including the Luton Sixth Form and Bushmead Primary school. There are some local shops located centrally. The area has countryside to its right and this has many walks and paths that lead to Warden Hill and Butterfield green. These areas are popular with dog-walkers and horse riders. The area can also access the local sports centre, Stopsley Recreational Centre, as it is within 15 minutes walking distance from the area. Bushmead Primary School is located here.

== Politics ==
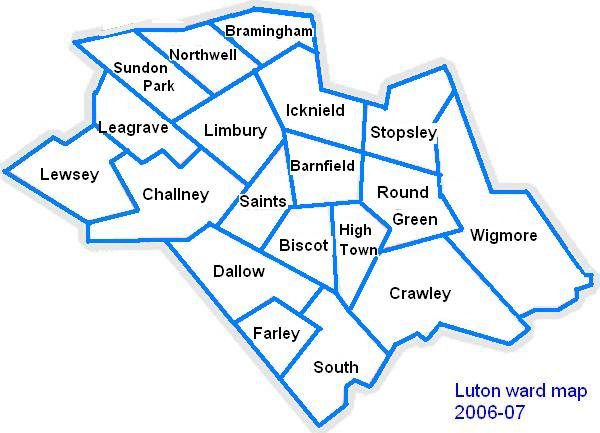
Map of Luton showing Barnfield Ward, the location of Bushmead

Bushmead is part of the Barnfield ward, which is represented by Cllr David Franks (Liberal Democrats) and Cllr Amjid Ali (Liberal Democrats).

The ward forms part of the parliamentary constituency of Luton North, and the MP is Sarah Owen (Labour).

== Local attractions ==
Key
	Abbey/Priory/Cathedral
Accessible open space	Accessible open space
	Amusement/Theme Park
	Castle
Country Park	Country Park
	English Heritage
	Forestry Commission
Heritage railway	Heritage railway
Historic house	Historic House
Places of Worship	Places of Worship
Museum (free) Museum	Museum (free/not free)
National Trust	National Trust
	Theatre
	Zoo

- Dunstable Downs
- Chiltern Hills
- Leagrave Park
- Leighton Buzzard Light Railway
- Luton Museum & Art Gallery
- The Hat Factory
- Luton Hoo
- Mossman Collection
- Someries castle
- Stockwood Craft Museum
- Stockwood Park
- Wardown Park
- Waulud's Bank
- Whipsnade Tree Cathedral
- Whipsnade Wildlife Park
- Woodside Farm and Wildfowl Park
- Wrest Park Gardens

== Local newspapers ==
Two weekly newspapers cover Bushmead, although they are not specific to the area.

They are the:

- Herald and Post
- Luton News
