= Barnfield, Luton =

Coordinates: 51.904°N 0.418°W

Barnfield
- Location within Bedfordshire
- Population: 7,032 (est.).
- OS grid reference: TL088240
- Unitary authority: Luton
- Ceremonial county: Bedfordshire
- Region: East
- Country: England
- Sovereign state: United Kingdom
- Post town: LUTON
- Postcode district: LU2
- Dialling code: 01582
- Police: Bedfordshire
- Fire: Bedfordshire
- Ambulance: East of England
- UK Parliament: Luton North

Barnfield is a suburb of Luton, in the Luton district, in the ceremonial county of Bedfordshire, England. The area is roughly bounded by Old Bedford Road/Cromer Way roundabout to the north; Wardown Park and Wardown Crescent to the south; the A6 to the west; and Old Bedford Road, Elmwood Crescent and Wardown Crescent to the east.

== Local area ==
The area is home to Barnfield College, a vocational college, and Luton Sixth Form College, a sixth form. The area consists largely of mature semi-detached and detached houses located around Old Bedford Road.

The area itself is mainly built up residential space, but the River Lea runs through it and there is a green space surrounding the path of the river.

== Politics ==
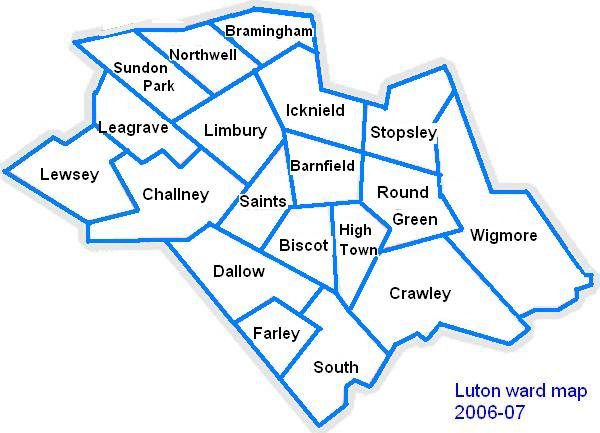
Map of Luton showing Barnfield

Barnfield is part of the larger Barnfield ward, which also includes Bushmead. The ward is represented by Cllr David Franks (Liberal Democrats) and Cllr Amjid Ali (Liberal Democrats). The ward forms part of the parliamentary constituency of Luton North, and the MP is Sarah Owen (Labour).

== Local attractions ==
Key
	Abbey/Priory/Cathedral
Accessible open space	Accessible open space
	Amusement/Theme Park
	Castle
Country Park	Country Park
	English Heritage
	Forestry Commission
Heritage railway	Heritage railway
Historic house	Historic House
Places of Worship	Places of Worship
Museum (free) Museum	Museum (free/not free)
National Trust	National Trust
	Theatre
	Zoo

- Chiltern Hills
- Dunstable Downs
- The Hat Factory
- Leagrave Park
- Leighton Buzzard Light Railway
- Luton Hoo
- Luton Museum & Art Gallery
- Mossman Collection
- Someries castle
- Stockwood Craft Museum
- Stockwood Park
- Wardown Park
- Waulud's Bank
- Whipsnade Tree Cathedral
- Whipsnade Wildlife Park
- Woodside Farm and Wildfowl Park
- Wrest Park Gardens

== Local newspapers ==
Two weekly newspapers cover Barnfield, although they are not specific to the area.

- Herald and Post
- Luton News
