= Farley Hill, Luton =

Suburb of Luton, England

Coordinates: 51.871°N 0.434°W

Farley Hill
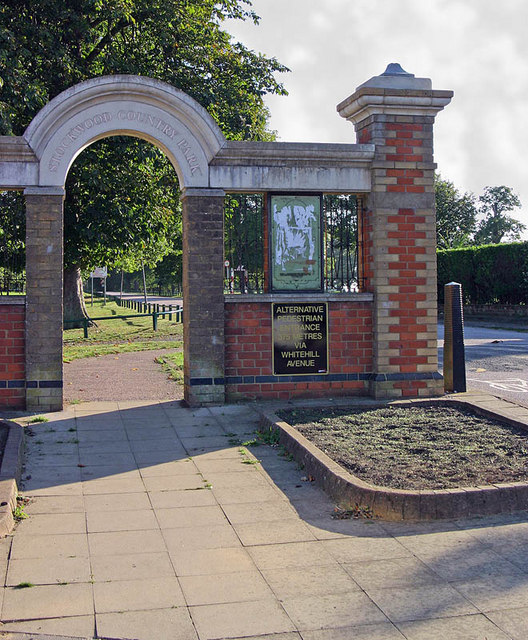
- Stockwood Park entrance, Luton

- Location within Bedfordshire
- Population: 11,560
- OS grid reference: TL0523
- Unitary authority: Luton
- Ceremonial county: Bedfordshire
- Region: East
- Country: England
- Sovereign state: United Kingdom
- Post town: LUTON
- Postcode district: LU1
- Dialling code: 01582
- Police: Bedfordshire
- Fire: Bedfordshire
- Ambulance: East of England
- UK Parliament: Luton South

Farley Hill is a suburb of south Luton, Bedfordshire, England. The area is roughly bounded by the Dallow Downs to the north and north-east, Stockwood Park to the south, the M1 motorway to the west, and Wilsden Avenue and Bolingbroke Road to the east.

== History ==
In the late 12th century, a hospital was built on the Stockwood Estate in Farley Hill. This old hospital was partly renovated and extended to house a museum that holds the Mossman Collection, a large collection of horsedrawn carriages and other vehicles, along with locally found artifacts, a historical garden and a craft center.

The estate was constructed after World War II to replace houses destroyed by German bombers. The design of the estate primarily consists of residential housing, which was considered advanced at the time of its construction, incorporating a shopping precinct in the centre of a large roundabout and a wide avenue stretching from the centre to the edge of Stockwood Park. Farley Hill is served by two junior schools: St Margaret Of Scotland Roman Catholic, which opened in 1960 to serve the large, mainly Irish, Roman Catholic population, and Farley Juniors, which opened in 1952.

A single secondary school, Rotheram Senior School, existed until 1988 but dwindling numbers and government funding restrictions led to its amalgamation with Stockwood High School into South Luton High School on Cutenhoe Road. The school then converted to academy status in 2007, and it was renamed Barnfield South Academy as part of the Barnfield Federation. In 2011, the school moved to a new £30 million building situated on the old playing field of the former Rotheram High School site. In 2015 the school changed its name to South Academy and became part of The Shared Learning Trust. In 2016 it was renamed as Stockwood Park Academy.

A view of Luton can be seen from the top of the Dallow Hills which are situated on the outskirts of the estate.

The area is next to Stockwood Park, which contains the Mossman Collection, Stockwood Museum, gardens, playing fields and 3 par golf course.

== Politics ==
The Farley ward is represented by Cllr Dave Taylor (Labour), Cllr Mahmood Hussain (Labour) and Cllr Sian Timoney (Labour). The ward forms part of the parliamentary constituency of Luton South and the MP is Rachel Hopkins.

== Local attractions ==
Key
| | Abbey/Priory/Cathedral |
| Accessible open space | Accessible open space |
| | Amusement/Theme Park |
| | Castle |
| Country Park | Country Park |
| | English Heritage |
| | Forestry Commission |
| Heritage railway | Heritage railway |
| Historic house | Historic House |
| Places of Worship | Places of Worship |
| Museum (free) Museum | Museum (free/not free) |
| National Trust | National Trust |
| | Theatre |
| | Zoo |

- Chiltern Hills
- Dunstable Downs
- The Hat Factory
- Leighton Buzzard Light Railway
- Luton Hoo
- Luton Museum & Art Gallery
- Mossman Collection
- Someries castle
- Stockwood Craft Museum
- Stockwood Park
- Wardown Park
- Waulud's Bank
- Whipsnade Tree Cathedral
- Whipsnade Wildlife Park
- Woodside Farm and Wildfowl Park
- Wrest Park Gardens

== Local newspapers ==
Two weekly newspapers cover Farley Hill, although they are not specific to the area.

- Herald and Post
- Luton News
