= Biscot =

Area of Luton, England

Coordinates: 51.893°N 0.428°W

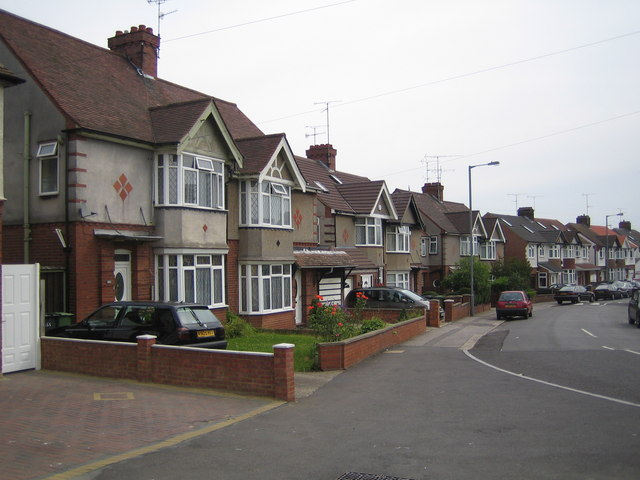
- Carlton Crescent in Biscot, Luton

- Location within Bedfordshire
- Population: 13,660 (including Bury Park)
- OS grid reference: TL059227
- Unitary authority: Luton
- Ceremonial county: Bedfordshire
- Region: East
- Country: England
- Sovereign state: United Kingdom
- Post town: LUTON
- Postcode district: LU3
- Dialling code: 01582
- Police: Bedfordshire
- Fire: Bedfordshire
- Ambulance: East of England
- UK Parliament: Luton South

Biscot is an area of Luton close to the town centre, in the Luton district, in the ceremonial county of Bedfordshire, England. The area is roughly bounded by Montrose Avenue to the north, the Midland Main Line to the west, and the A6 to the east.

== History ==
Until Luton absorbed Biscot in the early 20th century, Biscot was a small hamlet outside the town. The name of Biscot can be traced back to the Domesday Book where it is recorded as Bissopescote which means 'King's land'. Biscot Manor can be traced back to a charter of King Offa of Mercia of 792 in which he granted land of five tenants in Luton to Saint Albans Abbey.

The Domesday Book records a manor in Biscot comprising five hides (equated with the land of the five tenants of 792). The manor included ten villagers and three slaves - thirteen households, in other words, suggesting a population of a little over fifty. The value of the manor was forty shillings and Ralph Tallboys had transferred it to the royal manor of Luton. Before the conquest in 1066 it had been worth sixty shillings and had been held by Edwin "Asgar the Constable's man". By 1718 the manor had passed to an Arthur Wingate and in 1724 he sold it to John Crawley for £8,796/14/-. The manor remained in the Crawley family into the 20th century.

Biscot Mill was a well known landmark in Biscot from the 16th century right up until 1938. It was rebuilt in 1844 after it was destroyed by lightning during a storm. During the 19th century the mill was owned by the Drewett family, who were an influential family in Luton. The mill was later sold to Frank Scargill of Bramingham Shott (now Wardown Park). Due to the decline in the milling industry the mill finally shut down and dismantled in 1925, before the structure was demolished in 1938. Today the name is commemorated in the Biscot Mill pub at the northern edge of Biscot.

Commer produced trucks in Biscot for many years at their factory in Biscot Road. SKF, the Swedish ball bearing manufacturer, were located on Leagrave Road and employed many local people until the 1970s when they closed their operations in the area.

== World War I ==
Biscot Camp was the home of Number 6 Reserve Training Brigade (Territorial Forces) Royal Field Artillery. Many thousands of Gunners and Drivers, were trained here during World War I, before they were shipped overseas for service manning the big guns of the Royal Field Artillery.

Biscot Camp was a large establishment in the area framed by Kennington Road, Biscot Road, Holland Road, and Leagrave Road. These roads had been constructed immediately prior to the outbreak of war, but houses had not yet been built on them.

The author Dennis Wheatley trained here.

Historian Basil Williams was an Education Officer stationed here, and was awarded an O.B.E for his service. The commanding Officer during the early stages of the war, was a Colonel C.H. Alexander, he left in January 1917.

The camp closed in November 1919, and the last of the huts from the camp was demolished in September 1937, it was believed this hut was the YMCA hut, as it continued in use as St. Andrews Parish Hall.

== Politics ==
Biscot is part of the larger Biscot ward, which also includes part of Bury Park. The ward is represented by Cllr Zanib Raja (Labour) and Cllr Tahmina Saleem (Labour).

The ward forms part of the parliamentary constituency of Luton South and the MP is Rachel Hopkins (Labour).

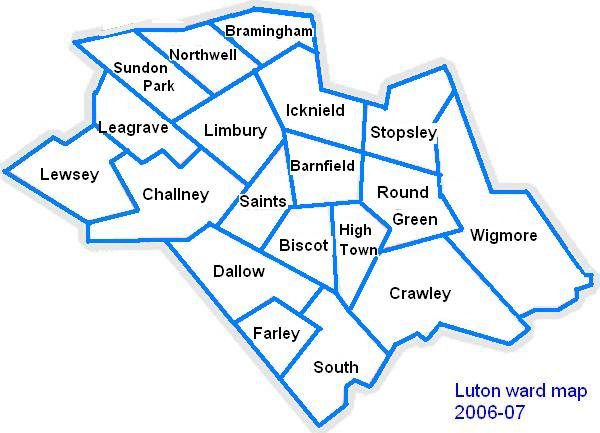
Map of Luton showing Biscot

== Local attractions ==
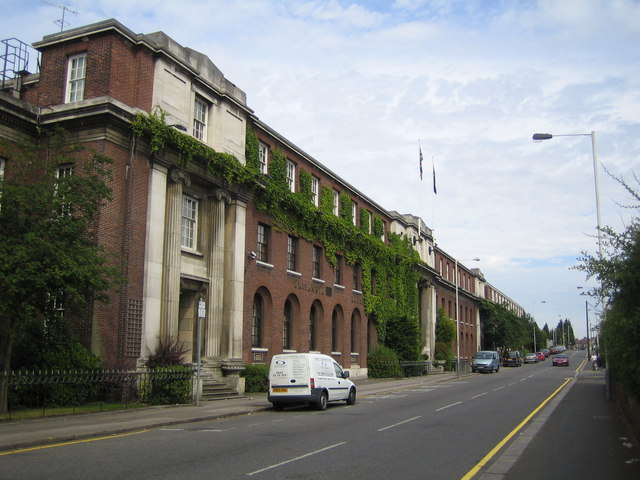
Britannia House. Originally this large industrial building on Leagrave Road was used by the Swedish ball-bearing manufacturer SKF, and their name can still be seen carved in the stonework at the top of the entrance portico. However it was sold in 1978 and SKF now occupy premises in Sundon Park Road elsewhere in Luton. The building is now used for multi-occupancy business suites

Key
| | Abbey/Priory/Cathedral |
| Accessible open space | Accessible open space |
| | Amusement/Theme Park |
| | Castle |
| Country Park | Country Park |
| | English Heritage |
| | Forestry Commission |
| Heritage railway | Heritage railway |
| Historic house | Historic House |
| Places of Worship | Places of Worship |
| Museum (free) Museum | Museum (free/not free) |
| National Trust | National Trust |
| | Theatre |
| | Zoo |

- Dunstable Downs
- Chiltern Hills
- Leagrave Park
- Leighton Buzzard Light Railway
- Luton Museum & Art Gallery
- the hat Factory
- Luton Hoo
- Mossman Collection
- Someries castle
- Stockwood Craft Museum
- Stockwood Park
- Wardown Park
- Waulud's Bank
- Whipsnade Tree Cathedral
- Whipsnade Wildlife Park
- Woodside Farm and Wildfowl Park
- Wrest Park Gardens

== Local newspapers ==
Two weekly newspapers cover Biscot, although they are not specific to the area.

They are the:

- Herald and Post
- Luton News
