= Challney =

District of Luton, England

Coordinates: 51.894°N 0.465°W

- Location within Bedfordshire
- Population: 13,360
- OS grid reference: TL0522
- Unitary authority: Luton
- Ceremonial county: Bedfordshire
- Region: East
- Country: England
- Sovereign state: United Kingdom
- Post town: LUTON
- Postcode district: LU4
- Dialling code: 01582
- Police: Bedfordshire
- Fire: Bedfordshire
- Ambulance: East of England
- UK Parliament: Luton North

Challney is a district in Luton, in the Luton district, in the ceremonial county of Bedfordshire, England, off the main arterial road leading from Luton into Dunstable. The area is roughly bounded by Rodheath, Stoneygate Road, Roman Road, and Beechwood Road to the north, Hatters Way to the south, the M1 to the west, and Waller Avenue and Chaul End Lane to the east.

== History ==
Challney was originally just another name for Chaul End up on the hill to the south of the district.

Challney was a sleepy residential area until the extension of the nearby M1 motorway on the west side which was built in the early 1960s. The Luton and Dunstable Hospital is also situated nearby in neighbouring Lewsey.

Challney is still a relatively residential area with good schooling and local amenities. One of Luton's large retail parks for DIY and electronic goods is located in the area and attracts visitors from all over the county. Leagrave railway station is close by for residents wishing to commute to Bedford or London.

Challney has separate high schools for boys and girls, Challney High School for Boys and Challney High School for Girls, both of which are located on Stoneygate Road. Challney Community College is also based in Stoneygate Road. The High School has recently been designated as a Leading Edge school and Challney is the Business Studies Spoke School for the elearning centre in Luton.

== Politics ==
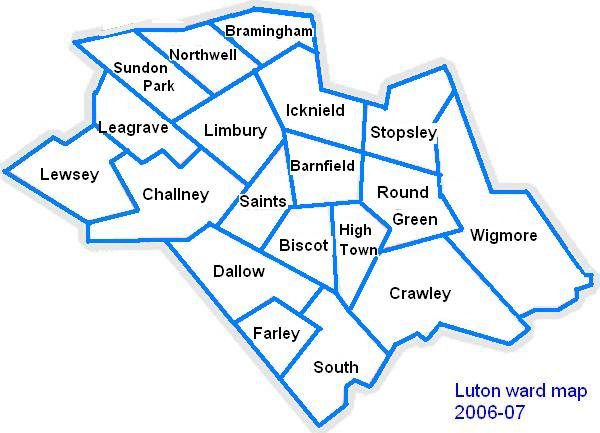
Map of Luton showing Challney

Challney is within the larger Challney ward, which also includes Skimpot and part of Maidenhall. The ward is represented by Cllr Khtija Malik (Labour), Cllr Tahir Malik (Labour) and Cllr Tom Shaw (Labour).

The ward forms part of the parliamentary constituency of Luton North, whose MP is Sarah Owen (Labour).

== Local attractions ==
Key
	Abbey/Priory/Cathedral
Accessible open space	Accessible open space
	Amusement/Theme Park
	Castle
Country Park	Country Park
	English Heritage
	Forestry Commission
Heritage railway	Heritage railway
Historic house	Historic House
Places of Worship	Places of Worship
Museum (free) Museum	Museum (free/not free)
National Trust	National Trust
	Theatre
	Zoo

- Dunstable Downs
- Chiltern Hills
- Leagrave Park
- Leighton Buzzard Light Railway
- Luton Museum & Art Gallery
- the hat Factory
- Luton Hoo
- Mossman Collection
- Someries Castle
- Stockwood Craft Museum
- Stockwood Park
- Wardown Park
- Waulud's Bank
- Whipsnade Tree Cathedral
- Whipsnade Wildlife Park
- Woodside Farm and Wildfowl Park
- Wrest Park Gardens

== Local newspapers ==
Two weekly newspapers cover Challney, although they are not specific to the area.

They are the:

- Herald and Post
- Luton News
