= Dallow =

Area of Luton, England

Coordinates: 51.882°N 0.435°W

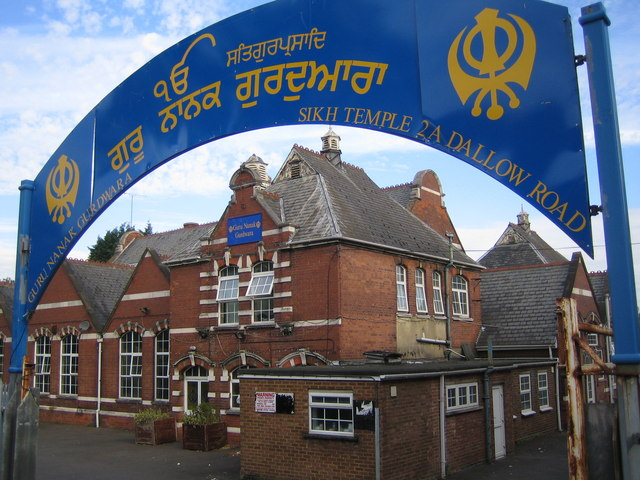
- A former school building in Dallow Road converted for use as a Sikh Temple

- Location within Bedfordshire
- Population: 13,154 (est.).
- OS grid reference: TL059227
- Unitary authority: Luton
- Ceremonial county: Bedfordshire
- Region: East
- Country: England
- Sovereign state: United Kingdom
- Post town: LUTON
- Postcode district: LU1
- Dialling code: 01582
- Police: Bedfordshire
- Fire: Bedfordshire
- Ambulance: East of England
- UK Parliament: Luton South

Dallow is an inner area of Luton about a half mile (0.8 km) west of the town centre and a ward of the Borough of Luton, in the ceremonial county of Bedfordshire, England. The extended area along Dallow Road is roughly bounded by Hatters Way to the north, Ashburnham Road to the south, the M1 to the west and Brantwood Road to the east.

== History ==
Some buildings in the area are to become part of Luton's Rothesay Preservation Area. The land was originally farmland and nearly all the buildings date from the late 19th century through to the 1920s. New enterprises such as Laporte's Chemical Works, the CWS cocoa works, Brown's Timberyard and the Davis gas stove factory were opened and the surrounding area was completed by 1920.

The Edwardian semi-detached houses of Brantwood Road, facing the park have an art deco style whilst those in Ashburnham Road include ornate balconies. The name of Rothesay is part of Luton's heritage, Rothesay Castle being the seat of the Earls and Marquesses of Bute, who stayed at Luton Hoo for many years during the eighteenth century and were also influential landowners.

== Demography ==
Dallow 2011 census ethnic groups	Population 16,393
White British	10.4%
Asian	67.2%
Black	7.6%

== Politics ==
Dallow is part of the larger Dallow ward, which also includes parts of Bury Park. The ward is represented by Cllr Mohammed Ashraf (Labour), Cllr Mohammed Farooq (Labour) and Cllr Tafheen Sharif (Labour).

The ward forms part of the parliamentary constituency of Luton South and the MP is Rachel Hopkins (Labour).

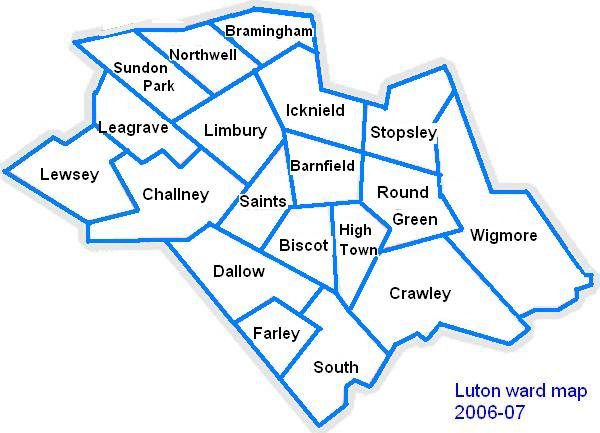
Map of Luton showing Dallow

== Local attractions ==
Key
	Abbey/Priory/Cathedral
Accessible open space	Accessible open space
	Amusement/Theme Park
	Castle
Country Park	Country Park
	English Heritage
	Forestry Commission
Heritage railway	Heritage railway
Historic house	Historic House
Places of Worship	Places of Worship
Museum (free) Museum	Museum (free/not free)
National Trust	National Trust
	Theatre
	Zoo

- Dunstable Downs
- Chiltern Hills
- Leagrave Park
- Leighton Buzzard Light Railway
- Luton Museum & Art Gallery
- the hat Factory
- Luton Hoo
- Mossman Collection
- Someries castle
- Stockwood Craft Museum
- Stockwood Park
- Wardown Park
- Waulud's Bank
- Whipsnade Tree Cathedral
- Whipsnade Zoo
- Woodside Farm and Wildfowl Park
- Wrest Park Gardens

== Local Newspapers ==
Two weekly newspapers are delivered free to all the houses in Dallow. However they are not specific to Dallow. They are:

- Herald and Post - Delivered every Thursday
- Luton on Sunday- Delivered every Sunday
