= Bramingham =

Suburb of Luton, England

Coordinates: 51.921°N 0.437°W

- Location within Bedfordshire
- Population: 8,310 (also includes part of Warden Hill)
- OS grid reference: TL 0733 2592
- Unitary authority: Luton
- Ceremonial county: Bedfordshire
- Region: East
- Country: England
- Sovereign state: United Kingdom
- Post town: Luton
- Postcode district: LU3
- Dialling code: 01582
- Police: Bedfordshire
- Fire: Bedfordshire
- Ambulance: East of England
- UK Parliament: Luton North

Bramingham is a suburb of Luton, in the Borough of Luton district, in the ceremonial county of Bedfordshire, England. The area is situated in the north of the town and is roughly bounded by the A6 to the east, Great Bramingham Wood to the west, the edge of Luton to the north, and Icknield Way to the south.

== History ==
Until the end of the 20th century Bramingham consisted of Great Bramingham, a small hamlet consisting of Great Bramingham Farm and a few scattered houses on Great Bramingham Lane, and Little Bramingham Farm, a farm near Bramingham Wood. Little Bramingham farmhouse still stands, located on Leamington Road, and is now a grade II listed building.

The area grew rapidly in the 1980s and 1990s to become part of Luton, expanding to meet Warden Hill in the east and Marsh Farm in the west.

== Local area ==
The housing in the area is mainly low density suburban housing built in typical 80s and 90s new build style, a traditional style with many incorporating mock timber frames or arched windows. A few 19th century cottages remain on Great Bramingham Lane.

At the centre of Bramingham is a parade of shops, a large Sainsbury's supermarket, a medical centre, Bramingham Park Church, and a pub - The Brim and Crown (formerly The Bramingham). Also in the area are Bramingham Primary School and a campus of Barnfield College.

On land of the former Great Bramingham Farm is Keech Cottage Hospice, a care charity for both adults and children.

There is also a large business park centred on Enterprise Way.

== Geography ==
Bramingham is in the north of Luton, roughly 5 miles from the town centre. Neighbouring areas are Limbury and Runfold to the south, Marsh Farm to the west, and Warden Hill to the east. North of Bramingham is still open countryside, although there are plans for a North Luton Bypass to be built, and infill housing between Bramingham and the new road.

== Bramingham Wood ==
Bramingham Wood is a natural woodland which forms the boundary between Bramingham and Marsh Farm. In 1985 The Woodland Trust, a nationwide charity, took over the management and subsequently the ownership of the wood from the private owners. The wood covers approximately 45 acres (180,000 m^{2}) and has been classified as an ancient woodland; that is, it has known to have been in existence for at least 400 years and has probably been a woodland for much longer.

After the Trust took over the wood, the Bramingham Wood Volunteers were formed who carry out much of the work on behalf of the Trust. A network of paths through the wood have been created.

The wood features a display of bluebells in the spring, while pink campion flourishes in the cleared areas.

== Politics ==
Bramingham is part of the larger Bramingham ward, which also contains Warden Hill, and is represented by Cllr Gilbert Campbell (Conservative) and Cllr John Young (Conservative).

The ward forms part of the parliamentary constituency of Luton North and the MP is Sarah Owen (Labour).

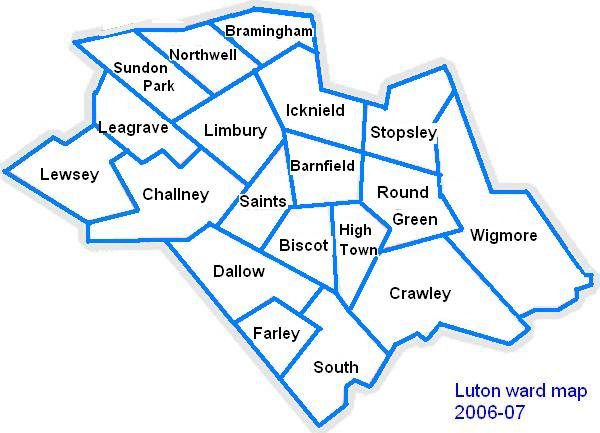
Map of Luton showing Bramingham ward

== Local attractions ==
Key
	Abbey/Priory/Cathedral
Accessible open space	Accessible open space
	Amusement/Theme Park
	Castle
Country Park	Country Park
	English Heritage
	Forestry Commission
Heritage railway	Heritage railway
Historic house	Historic House
Places of Worship	Places of Worship
Museum (free) Museum	Museum (free/not free)
National Trust	National Trust
	Theatre
	Zoo

- Bramingham Woods
- Chiltern Hills
- Dunstable Downs
- The Hat Factory
- Leagrave Park
- Leighton Buzzard Light Railway
- Luton Hoo
- Luton Museum & Art Gallery
- Mossman Collection
- Someries castle
- Stockwood Craft Museum
- Stockwood Park
- Wardown Park
- Waulud's Bank
- Whipsnade Tree Cathedral
- Whipsnade Zoo
- Woodside Farm and Wildfowl Park
- Wrest Park Gardens

== Local newspapers ==
Two weekly newspapers cover Bramingham, although they are not specific to the area.

- Herald and Post
- Luton News
