= Sundon Park =

Suburb of Luton, England

Coordinates: 51.92°N 0.47°W

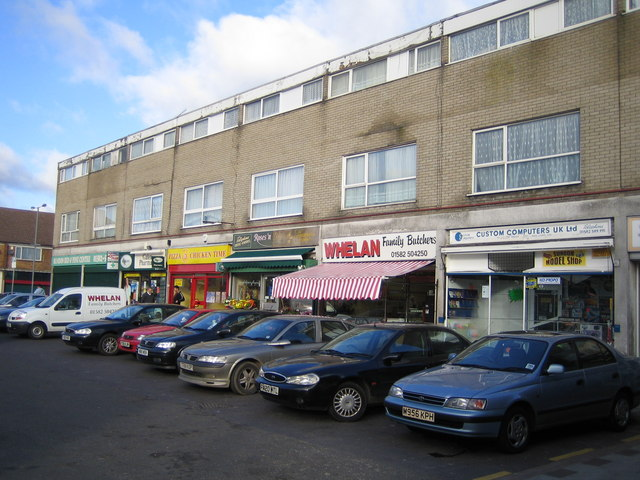
- Sundon Park Shopping Parade

- Location within Bedfordshire
- Population: 7,585 (est.).
- OS grid reference: TL055255
- Unitary authority: Luton
- Ceremonial county: Bedfordshire
- Region: East
- Country: England
- Sovereign state: United Kingdom
- Post town: LUTON
- Postcode district: LU3
- Dialling code: 01582
- Police: Bedfordshire
- Fire: Bedfordshire
- Ambulance: East of England
- UK Parliament: Luton South

Sundon Park is a suburb of north Luton, in the Luton district, in the ceremonial county of Bedfordshire, England. The area is roughly bounded by the edge of Luton to the north, Leagrave Park to the south, the Midland Main Line to the west, and Spinney Woods and the footpath from the woods to the edge of town to the east.

The name is taken from the nearby villages of Upper Sundon and Lower Sundon, and the estate was originally built as a self-contained community serving the SKF ball bearing factory.

== Local area ==
The "official" entrance to Sundon Park is through the "Sundon Arch", the railway bridge which connects Sundon Park Road to Toddington Road. The estate is in two distinct parts, divided by Hill Rise. The older part to the south (known colloquially as "the Avenues") consists of a number of long, straight avenues which are numbered ("Fourth Avenue", etc.). Fourth Avenue was the first to be built in the 1920s, followed by the other Avenues in the 1930s. North of Hill Rise, are the newer houses, built mainly in the 1950s and 1960s. Most of the roads here are named after hills and mountains e.g. Grampian Way, Pennine Avenue. These were all built as owner-occupier properties.

Shopping is provided around the junction of Hill Rise and Sundon Park Road, with a precinct featuring convenience stores, takeaways and a petrol station, and a large Aldi Superstore as well as a community centre. There is also a smaller parade of shops on Ashwell Avenue. The SKF factory has been largely turned into industrial units, with other large industrial facilities concentrated in the strip between Sundon Park Road and the railway line.

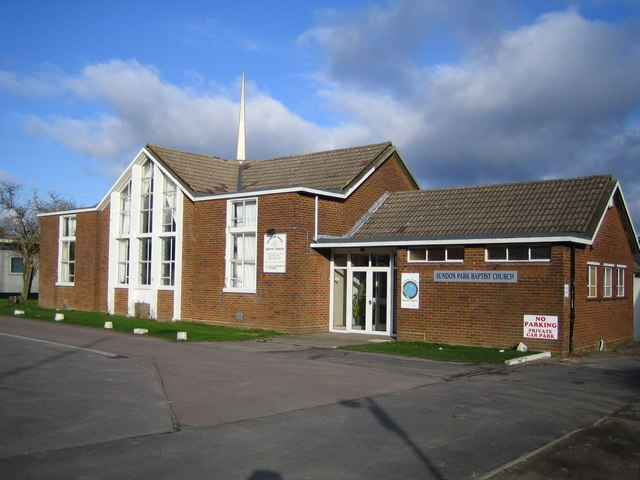
Luton, Sundon Park Baptist Church

== Education ==
There are two schools in the district. Parklea Primary School, on Cranbrook Drive and Kinross Crescent, caters for 4-11 year olds; and Lealands High School on Sundon Park Road is for 11-16 year olds. Next to Lealands is the City Learning Centre for Luton, elearning@luton.

== Politics ==
Sundon Park is within the Sundon Park ward (of which the southern tip also contains part of Leagrave) and is represented by Cllr Anna Pedersen (Liberal Democrats) and Cllr Clive Mead (Liberal Democrats).

The ward forms part of the parliamentary constituency of Luton North and the MP is Sarah Owen (Labour).

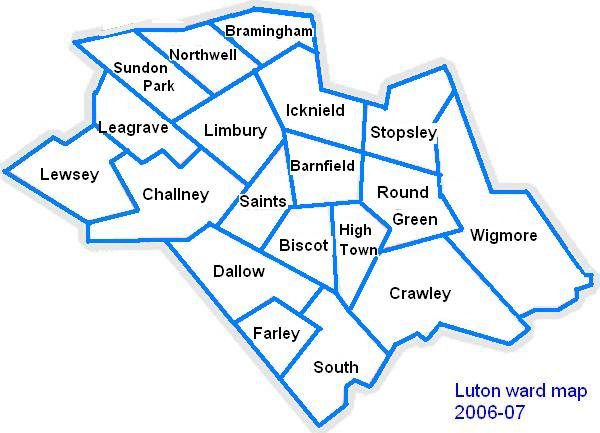
Map of Luton showing Sundon Park

== Local attractions ==
Key
	Abbey/Priory/Cathedral
Accessible open space	Accessible open space
	Amusement/Theme Park
	Castle
Country Park	Country Park
	English Heritage
	Forestry Commission
Heritage railway	Heritage railway
Historic house	Historic House
Places of Worship	Places of Worship
Museum (free) Museum	Museum (free/not free)
National Trust	National Trust
	Theatre
	Zoo

- Chiltern Hills
- Dunstable Downs
- The Hat Factory
- Leagrave Park
- Leighton Buzzard Light Railway
- Luton Hoo
- Luton Museum & Art Gallery
- Mossman Collection
- Someries castle
- Stockwood Craft Museum
- Stockwood Park
- Wardown Park
- Waulud's Bank
- Whipsnade Tree Cathedral
- Whipsnade Wildlife Park
- Woodside Farm and Wildfowl Park
- Wrest Park Gardens

== Local newspapers ==
Two weekly newspapers cover Sundon Park, although they are not specific to the area.

- Herald and Post
- Luton News
