= Hucklesby (surname) =

Hucklesby is a surname.

Hucklesby is an English surname of locational origin, likely derived from a place name in England. It is a rare variant of similar surnames such as "Huckerby," "Huckaby," and "Huckleby," which share common linguistic roots. The name is believed to have emerged in the Middle Ages as a means of identifying individuals based on their geographic origins or settlements, a common practice in the development of English surnames.

Etymology

The surname "Hucklesby" is thought to originate from a combination of Old English and Scandinavian elements. One possible source is the place name "Huckerby," near Gainsborough in Lincolnshire, England. This toponym is composed of the Old English hocer (meaning "knob" or "hump," possibly referring to a landscape feature) and the Old Norse by (meaning "homestead" or "settlement"). The additional "s" in "Hucklesby" may reflect a phonetic evolution or scribal variation, which was common as surnames were recorded in medieval documents. Alternatively, it could be a later adaptation of "Huckerby," influenced by regional dialects or spelling inconsistencies.

Another theory links "Hucklesby" to surnames like "Huckaby," associated with Huccaby in Devon, England, derived from Old English woh ("crooked") and byge ("river bend"). However, the precise connection to "Hucklesby" remains speculative without further historical evidence.

History and Distribution

Locational surnames like "Hucklesby" were typically adopted by individuals who left their original villages or hamlets to settle elsewhere, using their place of origin as an identifier. The surname appears infrequently in historical records, suggesting it either remained localized or diverged into more common variants over time. Census data and genealogical records indicate that "Hucklesby" and its variants are primarily found in England, particularly in counties such as Bedfordshire, Hertfordshire, and Lincolnshire, with some migration to English-speaking countries like the United States, New Zealand and South Africa.

The earliest known occurrences of "Hucklesby" date back to the late 18th century, with records from parish registers and census documents showing its use in southern and eastern England. Its rarity may reflect a small founding population or assimilation into related surnames.

Notable people with the name include:

- Anthea Hucklesby (born 1966), professor of criminal justice at the University of Leeds
- Asher Hucklesby (1844–1908), five times mayor of Luton, Bedfordshire, between 1892 and 1906
