= 2023 Luton Borough Council election =

2023 local government election in Luton

- 4 May 2023

All 48 seats to Luton Borough Council 25 seats needed for a majority

	First party	Second party	Third party
Leader	Hazel Simmons	David Franks	John Young
Party	Labour	Liberal Democrats	Conservative
Last election	32 seats, 56.7%	12 seats, 17.2%	4 seats, 19.2%
Seats before	28	17	2
Seats won	30	15	3
Seat change	▼2	▲3	▼1
Popular vote	19,199	14,036	3,998
Percentage	48.7%	35.6%	10.1%
Swing	▼8.0%	▲18.4pp	▼9.1pp
- Winner of each seat at the 2023 Luton Borough Council election
Leader before election
Hazel Simmons
Labour
Leader after election
Hazel Simmons
Labour

The 2023 Luton Borough Council election took place on 4 May 2023 to elect members of Luton Borough Council in Luton, Bedfordshire, England. This was on the same day as other local elections across England. Labour retained its majority on the council.

== Overview ==
New ward boundaries were drawn up for this election, increasing the number of wards from 19 to 20, although the overall number of councillors stayed the same at 48.

The council had been controlled by Labour since 2007, with its leader since then being Hazel Simmons. Issues debated by the candidates included the ongoing financial impact on the council of money it lost due to the COVID-19 pandemic, when flights from council-owned Luton Airport were stopped. Suggestions for how to improve the town centre were also debated, with Historic England having added the town centre's main street, George Street, to its Heritage at Risk Register in November 2022.

Shortly before the election, three Labour councillors who were not re-selected to be Labour candidates at this election left the party; two (Ghulam Javed and Summara Khurshid) joined the Liberal Democrats and one (Anne Donelon) sat as an independent.

Labour retained a majority on the council, winning 30 of the 48 seats. Of the councillors elected at this election, 20 had not been councillors in the previous term. The two former Labour councillors who joined the Liberal Democrats shortly before the election both stood as Liberal Democrat candidates; both were defeated by Labour.

== Summary ==
=== Election result ===
The overall results were:

2023 Luton Borough Council election
Party	Candidates	Seats	Gains	Losses	Net gain/loss	Seats %	Votes %	Votes	+/−
Labour	48	30	0	2	▼2	62.5	48.7	19,199	–8.0
Liberal Democrats	33	15	2	0	▲3	31.3	35.6	14,036	+18.4
Conservative	15	3	0	0	▼1	6.3	10.1	3,998	–9.1
Independent	8	0	0	0	Steady	0.0	4.3	1,713	+0.4
Reform	2	0	0	0	Steady	0.0	1.2	455	N/A

== Ward results ==
The Statement of Persons Nominated, which details the candidates standing in each ward, was released by Luton Borough Council following the close of nominations on 5 April 2023. The results were as follows, with sitting councillors standing for re-election marked with an asterisk(*):

=== Barnfield ===
Barnfield (3 seats)
Party	Candidate	Votes	%	±%
Liberal Democrats	David Franks*	1,690	52.8	
Liberal Democrats	Jeff Petts*	1,627	50.9	
Liberal Democrats	Amjid Ali*	1,551	48.5	
Labour	Shahriar Ahmed	1,174	36.7	
Labour	Sameera Saleem*	956	29.9	
Labour	Anwar Haque	932	29.1	
Conservative	Alex Dearden	378	11.8	
Conservative	Sam Deekue	371	11.6	
Conservative	Zahid Mohmand	274	8.6	
Turnout		3,199	36.1	
Registered electors		8,862		
Liberal Democrats hold				
Liberal Democrats hold				
Liberal Democrats win (new seat)				

=== Beech Hill ===
Beech Hill (3 seats)
Party	Candidate	Votes	%	±%
Labour	Rumi Chowdhury	2,158	67.6	
Labour	Javed Hussain*	2,127	66.7	
Labour	Rehana Malik	1,928	60.4	
Liberal Democrats	Mahbubul Karim	958	30.0	
Liberal Democrats	Adrees Latif	947	29.7	
Liberal Democrats	Ghulam Javed*	737	23.1	
Turnout		3,220	36.1	
Registered electors		8,917		
Labour win (new seat)				
Labour win (new seat)				
Labour win (new seat)				

=== Biscot ===
Biscot (2 seats)
Party	Candidate	Votes	%	±%
Labour	Zanib Raja	937	42.7	
Labour	Tahmina Saleem*	929	42.3	
Independent	Fazilat Ali-Khan	713	32.5	
Independent	Tipu Moheeuddin	643	29.3	N/A
Liberal Democrats	Shahin Uddin	525	23.9	
Liberal Democrats	Junaid Malik	431	19.6	N/A
Turnout		2,222	34.4	
Registered electors		6,463		
Labour hold				
Labour hold				

=== Bramingham ===
Bramingham (3 seats)
Party	Candidate	Votes	%	±%
Conservative	Stuart Miller	1,601	50.9	
Conservative	John Baker	1,529	48.6	
Conservative	Aziz Ambia	1,463	46.5	
Labour	Desmond Billington	1,279	40.7	
Labour	Bodrul Amin	1,268	40.3	
Labour	Mehmood Khan	1,171	37.2	
Turnout		3,179	33.1	
Registered electors		9,591		
Conservative hold				
Conservative hold				
Conservative win (new seat)				

=== Central ===
Central (2 seats)
Party	Candidate	Votes	%	±%
Labour	Fatima Begum*	626	73.9	
Labour	Yaqub Hanif	447	52.8	
Independent	Belal Ahmed	195	23.0	
Liberal Democrats	Abid Aziz	122	14.4	
Liberal Democrats	Amir Aziz	110	13.0	
Independent	Anwar Hussain	78	9.2	
Turnout		858	16.5	
Registered electors		5,203		
Labour win (new seat)				
Labour win (new seat)				

=== Challney ===
Challney (3 seats)
Party	Candidate	Votes	%	±%
Labour	Basit Mahmood	1,572	62.7	
Labour	Khtija Malik*	1,562	62.3	
Labour	Tom Shaw*	1,546	61.7	
Liberal Democrats	Mohammed Javid	654	26.1	
Liberal Democrats	Shahid Zaman	593	23.7	
Liberal Democrats	Farzana Ahktar	587	23.4	
Turnout		2,540	27.4	
Registered electors		9,270		
Labour hold				
Labour hold				
Labour hold				

=== Dallow ===
Dallow (2 seats)
Party	Candidate	Votes	%	±%
Labour	Mohammed Farooq	1,101	62.2	
Labour	Alia Khan*	1,059	59.8	
Liberal Democrats	Bashrat Hussain	619	35.0	
Liberal Democrats	Abbas Hussain*	492	27.8	
Turnout		1,793	32.3	
Registered electors		5,556		
Labour hold				
Labour hold				

Dallow ward was represented by three councillors prior to the boundary changes which took effect for this election. Immediately before the election it was represented by two Labour and one Liberal Democrat councillors, the latter being Abbas Hussain who defected from Labour shortly before the election.

=== Farley ===
Farley (3 seats)
Party	Candidate	Votes	%	±%
Labour	Javeria Hussain*	Unopposed		
Labour	Mahmood Hussain*	Unopposed		
Labour	Dave Taylor*	Unopposed		
Registered electors				
Labour hold				
Labour hold				
Labour hold				

=== High Town ===
High Town (2 seats)
Party	Candidate	Votes	%	±%
Labour	James Taylor	798	56.1	
Labour	Umme Ali*	783	55.0	
Independent	John French	446	31.3	N/A
Independent	Mohammed Shahid	294	20.7	N/A
Conservative	Lesley Hill	231	16.2	
Turnout		1,436	23.1	
Registered electors		6,224		
Labour hold				
Labour hold				

=== Leagrave ===
Leagrave (2 seats)
Party	Candidate	Votes	%	±%
Labour	Maria Lovell*	1,020	55.1	
Labour	Francis Steer	842	45.5	
Conservative	Ifthekher Alom	692	37.4	
Conservative	Malik Nikyalvi	465	25.1	
Reform	James Fletcher	224	12.1	
Turnout		1,860	27.1	
Registered electors		6,863		
Labour hold				
Labour hold				

=== Lewsey ===
Lewsey (2 seats)
Party	Candidate	Votes	%	±%
Labour	Hazel Simmons*	1,008	74.3	
Labour	Yarun Begum	912	67.3	
Conservative	Edward Carpenter	272	20.1	
Independent	Afia Parveen	142	10.5	
Turnout		1,366	22.0	
Registered electors		6,215		
Labour hold				
Labour hold				

=== Northwell ===
Northwell (3 seats)
Party	Candidate	Votes	%	±%
Labour	Rob Roche*	1,400	60.1	
Labour	Amy Nicholls*	1,397	60.0	
Labour	Babatunde Ajisola	1,306	56.1	
Conservative	Philip Turner	664	28.5	
Conservative	Ash Ali	520	22.3	
Conservative	Shashi Rudrangi	482	20.7	
Reform	Jim Cohen	231	9.9	
Independent	Anwar Hussain	217	9.3	
Turnout		2,338	25.4	
Registered electors		9,214		
Labour hold				
Labour hold				
Labour win (new seat)				

Prior to the election Northwell was represented by two councillors, one of whom (Anne Donelon) had been elected as Labour but subsequently left the party and sat as an independent.

=== Poets ===
Poets (2 seats)
Party	Candidate	Votes	%	±%
Labour	Jacqui Burnett*	919	53.0	
Labour	Aslam Khan*	866	49.9	
Liberal Democrats	Taimoor Ali	749	43.2	
Liberal Democrats	Evaline Omondi	692	39.9	
Turnout		1,752	30.2	
Registered electors		5,803		
Labour win (new seat)				
Labour win (new seat)				

=== Round Green ===
Round Green (2 seats)
Party	Candidate	Votes	%	±%
Liberal Democrats	Gillian Fry	910	48.6	
Liberal Democrats	Zahoor Ahmed	799	42.7	
Labour	Raja Khan	785	41.9	
Labour	Yasmin Waheed*	682	36.4	
Conservative	Saiful Choudhury	160	8.5	
Conservative	Mohammed Shaikh	136	7.3	
Turnout		1,884	29.3	
Registered electors		6,433		
Liberal Democrats gain from Labour				
Liberal Democrats hold				

Prior to the election Round Green was represented by three councillors: two Liberal Democrats and one Labour.

=== Saints ===
Saints (3 seats)
Party	Candidate	Votes	%	±%
Labour	Saima Hussain*	1,630	54.1	
Labour	Ghulam Abbas	1,594	52.9	
Labour	Shahanara Naser	1,525	50.6	
Liberal Democrats	Anwar Malik	1,202	39.9	
Liberal Democrats	Summara Khurshid*	1,187	39.4	
Liberal Democrats	Baber Hussain	1,078	35.8	
Turnout		3,052	35.4	
Registered electors		8,615		
Labour hold				
Labour hold				
Labour hold				

=== South ===
South (2 seats)
Party	Candidate	Votes	%	±%
Liberal Democrats	Steve Stephens	710	51.9	
Labour	Charmaine Isles	645	47.2	
Liberal Democrats	Deborah Abodunrin-Olokode	602	44.0	
Labour	David Agbley*	589	43.1	
Turnout		1,378	22.9	
Registered electors		6,025		
Liberal Democrats gain from Labour				
Labour hold				

=== Stopsley ===
Stopsley (3 seats)
Party	Candidate	Votes	%	±%
Liberal Democrats	Richard Underwood*	2,185	76.1	
Liberal Democrats	David Wynn*	2,142	74.6	
Liberal Democrats	Nigel Marshall	2,137	74.4	
Labour	Shajarul Islam	629	21.9	
Labour	Imtiaz Ahmed	596	20.7	
Labour	Sadiqul Choudhury	593	20.6	
Turnout		2,884	31.5	
Registered electors		9,170		
Liberal Democrats hold				
Liberal Democrats hold				
Liberal Democrats win (new seat)				

=== Sundon Park ===
Sundon Park (2 seats)
Party	Candidate	Votes	%	±%
Liberal Democrats	Steve Moore*	1,010	57.5	
Liberal Democrats	Clive Mead*	962	54.8	
Labour	Deanne Johnson	722	41.1	
Labour	Masood Akhtar	630	35.9	
Turnout		1,767	31.6	
Registered electors		5,592		
Liberal Democrats hold				
Liberal Democrats hold				

=== Vauxhall ===
Vauxhall (2 seats)
Party	Candidate	Votes	%	±%
Liberal Democrats	Terry Keens*	893	66.2	
Liberal Democrats	Lee Bridgen*	868	64.4	
Labour	Shana Begum	422	31.3	
Labour	Bobby Thomas	389	28.9	
Turnout		1,354	26.3	
Registered electors		5,142		
Liberal Democrats win (new seat)				
Liberal Democrats win (new seat)				

=== Wigmore ===
Wigmore (2 seats)
Party	Candidate	Votes	%	±%
Liberal Democrats	Claire Gallagher	1,809	81.5	
Liberal Democrats	Alan Skepelhorn*	1,760	79.3	
Labour	Raja Ahmed*	374	16.8	
Labour	Barnes Mayunga	338	15.2	
Turnout		2,249	32.4	
Registered electors		6,931		
Liberal Democrats hold				
Liberal Democrats hold				

== Post-election changes ==
=== Affiliation changes ===
- Aslam Khan, elected for Labour, left the party in September 2023. He subsequently joined the Conservatives in October 2023.
- Stuart Miller, elected as a Conservative, left the party to sit as an independent in March 2024.

=== By-elections ===
==== Barnfield ====
Barnfield: 26 September 2024
Party	Candidate	Votes	%	±%
Liberal Democrats	Anwar Malik	1,169	63.5	+11.4
Labour	Karen Roy	321	17.4	–18.8
Conservative	Ash Ali	209	11.4	–0.3
Green	Edward Carpenter	110	6.0	N/A
Independent	Marc Scheimann	32	1.7	N/A
Majority		848	46.1	N/A
Turnout		1,848	19.8	–16.3
Registered electors		9,353		
Liberal Democrats hold		Swing	▲15.1	

Barnfield by-election triggered by the resignation of Liberal Democrat councillor Jeff Petts.

==== Wigmore (2024) ====
Wigmore: 26 September 2024
Party	Candidate	Votes	%	±%
Liberal Democrats	Adrees Latif	749	54.6	–28.3
Independent	Carolyn Cottier	209	15.2	N/A
Conservative	Philip Turner	151	11.0	N/A
Labour	Farid Ahmed	137	10.0	–7.1
Green	Elissa Gordon	125	9.1	N/A
Majority		540	39.4	N/A
Turnout		1,371	19.5	–12.9
Registered electors		7,053		
Liberal Democrats hold				

Wigmore by-election triggered by the resignation of Liberal Democrat councillor Claire Gallagher.

==== Stopsley ====
Stopsley by-election: 4 September 2025
Party	Candidate	Votes	%	±%
Liberal Democrats	Matt Fry	935	41.3	–36.3
Reform	Jim Cohen	820	36.2	N/A
Labour	Moazzem Hussain	251	11.1	–11.3
Conservative	Roger Nichols	152	6.7	N/A
Green	Edward Carpenter	87	3.8	N/A
Independent	Marc Scheimann	19	0.8	N/A
Majority		115	5.1	N/A
Turnout		2,279	24.8	–6.7
Registered electors		9,182		
Liberal Democrats hold				

==== Wigmore (2026) ====
Wigmore by-election: 2 April 2026 Disqualification of Alan Skepelhorn (Liberal Democrats) due to non-attendance
Party	Candidate	Votes	%	±%
Reform	James Fletcher	576	32.9	N/A
Liberal Democrats	George Neculaiu	533	30.4	−52.5
Green	Carolyn Cottier	344	19.6	N/A
Labour	Georgia Marcantonio	170	9.7	−7.4
Conservative	Sam Choudhury	116	6.6	N/A
Independent	Marc Scheimann	13	0.7	N/A
Majority		43	2.5	N/A
Turnout		1,752		
Reform gain from Liberal Democrats				
