= Asher Hucklesby =

British businessman

- Asher Hucklesby
- Born: Asher John Hucklesby; 1844; Stopsley, Bedfordshire, England
- Died: 3 January 1908 (aged 63); Luton, Bedfordshire, England
- Occupations: Industrialist and politician

Asher John Hucklesby JP (1844 – 3 January 1908) was an English businessman who was the five-time mayor of Luton, Bedfordshire between 1892 and 1906. A major hat manufacturer, he became known as the "straw hat king."

From modest beginnings as the son of a grocer in Stopsley, he became the owner of the largest hat business in Luton. Hucklesby began working for hat manufacturer CJ Rosson at the age of 13. When he eventually started his own business, it was an immediate success. In 1880 he bought the site of the old Luton Times offices and the neighbouring Spencer's Yard in George Street for £4,500 and built a large warehouse (now demolished).

Hucklesby also used the upper floor of 48 George Street as a warehouse as well as 12 Guildford Street. Buying the site in George Street was a very shrewd business move. The building of the proposed tramway in George Street had made it impossible for businesses along that road to load goods for the railway station but Hucklesby already owned Bond Street, which ran from George Street to Barber's Lane, giving him a private and direct link with the railway station. Bond Street is now lost as a road in Luton, it would have run roughly where Primark now is. The warehouse he built is now the site of MacDonalds and Snappy Snaps. His business went on to be Lutons most successful hat manufacturing business during the 19th Century.

As well as his council duties and his thriving business, Hucklesby also found time to serve as a JP and was active in the local church. He was president of the local YMCA and also the Temperance Federation. He was keen on educating the people of Luton and the University of Bedfordshire is on the site of Luton Secondary (later Modern) School, which he helped to found in 1904 and was a member of the governing body.

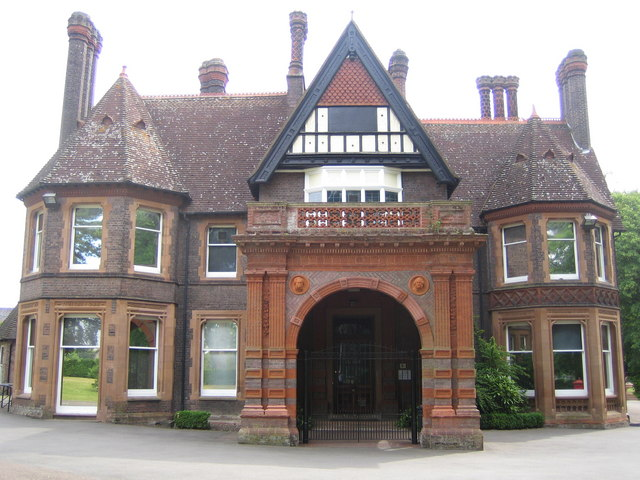
Luton Museum & Art Gallery.

Along with councilor Edwin Oakley, Hucklesby purchased the estate that became Wardown Park for £16,500 in 1904 and sold it to Luton Council at the cost price, for the perpetual enjoyment of the people of Luton. Hucklesby lived in Leaside Villa which was built in 1878 and is now a hotel and restaurant (The Leaside Hotel) and the newly constructed road outside the hotel bears his name (Hucklesby Way).

On his death in 1908, he was given a civic funeral, the largest the town has ever seen, with hundreds of people lining the route to his burial in Rothesay Road cemetery. He left a massive fortune of £164,862 (£17.1 million as of 2025).
