= Anthea Hucklesby =

British university professor

Anthea Hucklesby is a British academic who is Professor of Criminal Justice at the University of Birmingham where she holds a joint appointment in Birmingham Law School and the School of Social Policy. She was Head of the School of Social Policy at the University of Birmingham 2020–2022. She was a member of the Law School at the University of Leeds between 2003 and 2020 where she was latterly Pro-Dean for research and innovation in the Faculty of Social Sciences. She is a Fellow of the Academy of Social Sciences and the Royal Society for the encouragement of Arts, Manufactures and Commerce (RSA).

In 2016 she gave evidence before a House of Commons committee in connection with the Policing and Crime Bill 2015–16.

== Selected publications ==
- Prisoner Resettlement: policy and practice (Willan, 2007), xiv, 306p
- Drug Interventions in Criminal Justice (Open University Press, 2010) (With E. Wincup)
- Bail Support Schemes for Adults, Researching Criminal Justice series (Policy Press, 2011)
- Criminal Justice, ed. by Hucklesby A and Wahidin A (Oxford University Press, 2013)
- Legitimacy and Compliance in Criminal Justice, ed. by Crawford A and Hucklesby A (Routledge, 2013)
