= Saints, Luton =

Suburb of Luton, England

Coordinates: 51.901°N 0.444°W

Saints
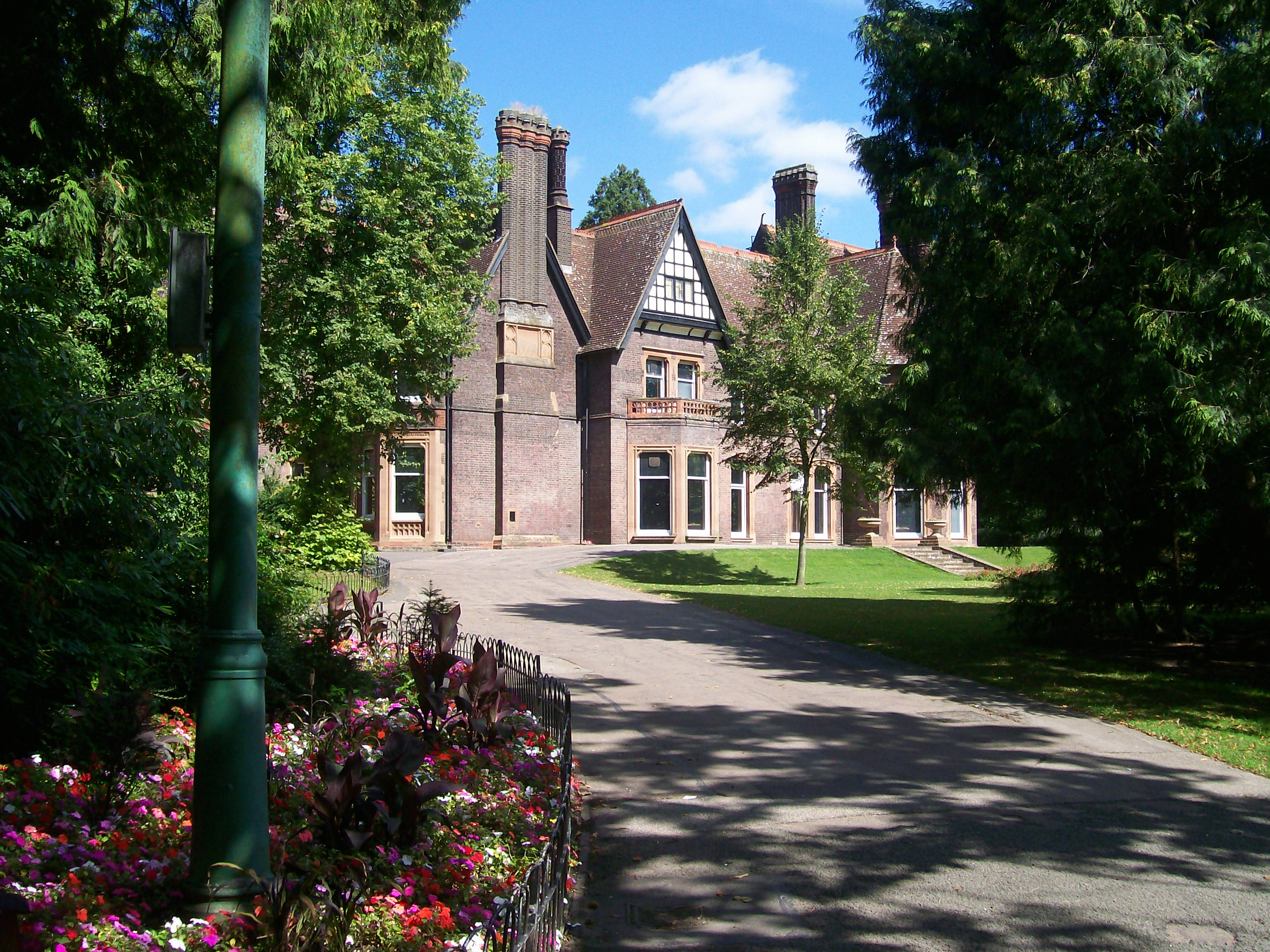
- Luton Museum in Wardown Park

- Location within Bedfordshire
- Population: 14,841
- OS grid reference: TL070236
- Unitary authority: Luton
- Ceremonial county: Bedfordshire
- Region: East
- Country: England
- Sovereign state: United Kingdom
- Post town: LUTON
- Postcode district: LU3
- Dialling code: 01582
- Police: Bedfordshire
- Fire: Bedfordshire
- Ambulance: East of England
- UK Parliament: Luton North

Saints is a suburb of Luton, in the Luton district, in the ceremonial county of Bedfordshire, England. It is located off New Bedford Road and two miles north of the Luton town centre. The area is bounded by the River Lea to the north, Montrose Avenue to the south, Blundell Road and Leagrave Road to the west, and the A6 to the east.

== History ==
Moated houses still existed in around Limbury at the beginning of the 20th century. The Moat House, which is now in Saints, is the only one remaining (now a pub/restaurant). It is the oldest secular building in South Bedfordshire. In 2007 the Moat House had its roof re-thatched.

The name Saints is taken from the group of streets off Montrose Avenue that are named after early Christian saints such as St Ethelbert, St Catherine and St Augustine. The area is located near Wardown Park and was an ideal location for the rich merchants and tradesmen commuting to the town centre each day during the first half of the twentieth century.

== Local area ==
The area mainly consists of inter-war suburban housing.

The central shopping area is located on Bishopscote Road, and the area also contains William Austin Junior and Infants school.

Two weekly newspapers cover Saints, although they are not specific to the area: the Herald and Post, and Luton News.

== Politics ==
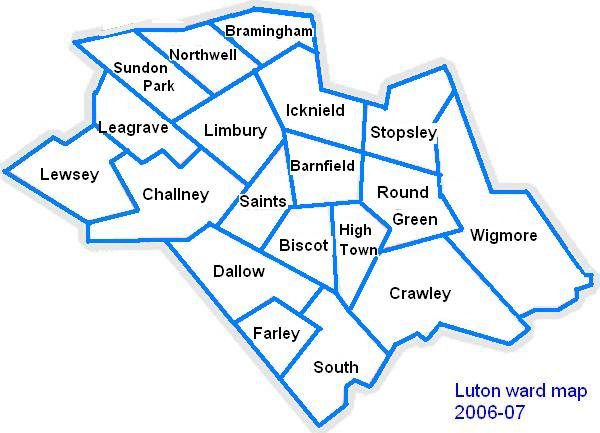
Map of Luton showing Saints

Saints is part of the larger Saints ward, which also contains Maidenhall. The ward is represented by Cllr Javed Hussain (Labour), Cllr Ghulam Javed (Labour) and Cllr Summara Khurshid (Labour). The ward forms part of the parliamentary constituency of Luton North, whose MP is Sarah Owen (Labour).
