= Northwell, Luton =

Electoral ward of Luton, England

Coordinates: 51.919°N 0.452°W

Northwell
- Location within Bedfordshire
- Population: 8,258 (est.).
- OS grid reference: TL064256
- Unitary authority: Luton
- Ceremonial county: Bedfordshire
- Region: East
- Country: England
- Sovereign state: United Kingdom
- Post town: LUTON
- Postcode district: LU3
- Dialling code: 01582
- Police: Bedfordshire
- Fire: Bedfordshire
- Ambulance: East of England
- UK Parliament: Luton North

Northwell is a parliamentary ward of the Luton, in the north of Luton, in the ceremonial county of Bedfordshire, England. The ward contains the suburb of Marsh Farm.

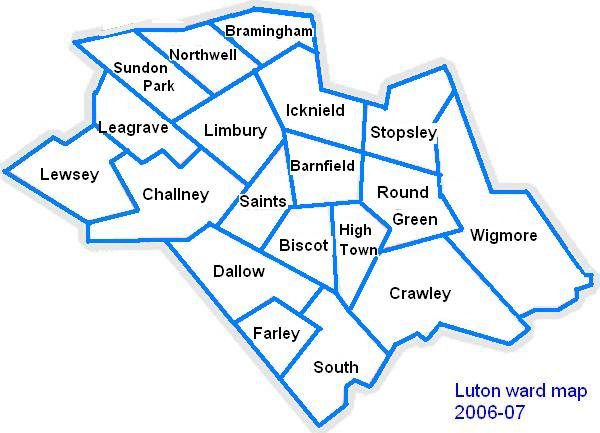
Map of Luton showing Northwell

Northwell ward is represented by Cllr Amy Nicholls (Labour), Cllr Babatunde Ajisola (Labour) and Cllr Rob Roche (Labour).

The ward forms part of the parliamentary constituency of Luton North and the MP is Sarah Owen (Labour).
