= Stockwood Discovery Centre =

Museum in Luton, Bedfordshire, United Kingdom

Coordinates: 51°51′58″N 000°25′21″W

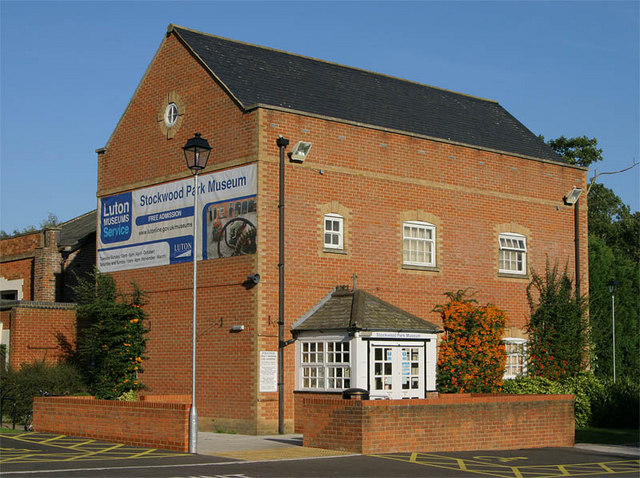
- Established: 1954
- Location: Stockwood Park, Luton, England
- Website: www.stockwooddiscoverycentre.com

Stockwood Discovery Centre, formerly known as Stockwood Craft Museum, is one of two free admission museums situated in Luton (the other is Wardown Park Museum). The museums in Luton are a part of a charitable trust, Luton Culture.

The discovery centre displays collections of local social history, archaeology, geology and rural crafts. It also houses the biggest collection of horse-drawn carriages in Europe, the Mossman Collection.

The external part of the Discovery Centre features extensive gardens. The Period Gardens, ranging from the Elizabethan Knot Garden to the Dig for Victory Garden, were created by Luton Council from the mid-1980s onwards. Redevelopment work in 2007 included the building of the Sensory Garden, World Garden and Medicinal Garden. It is one of the few places in the country where the work of artist Ian Hamilton Finlay can be seen on permanent display. Improvement Garden is a classical garden in which Ian Hamilton Finlay sculptures are an integral part of the landscape.

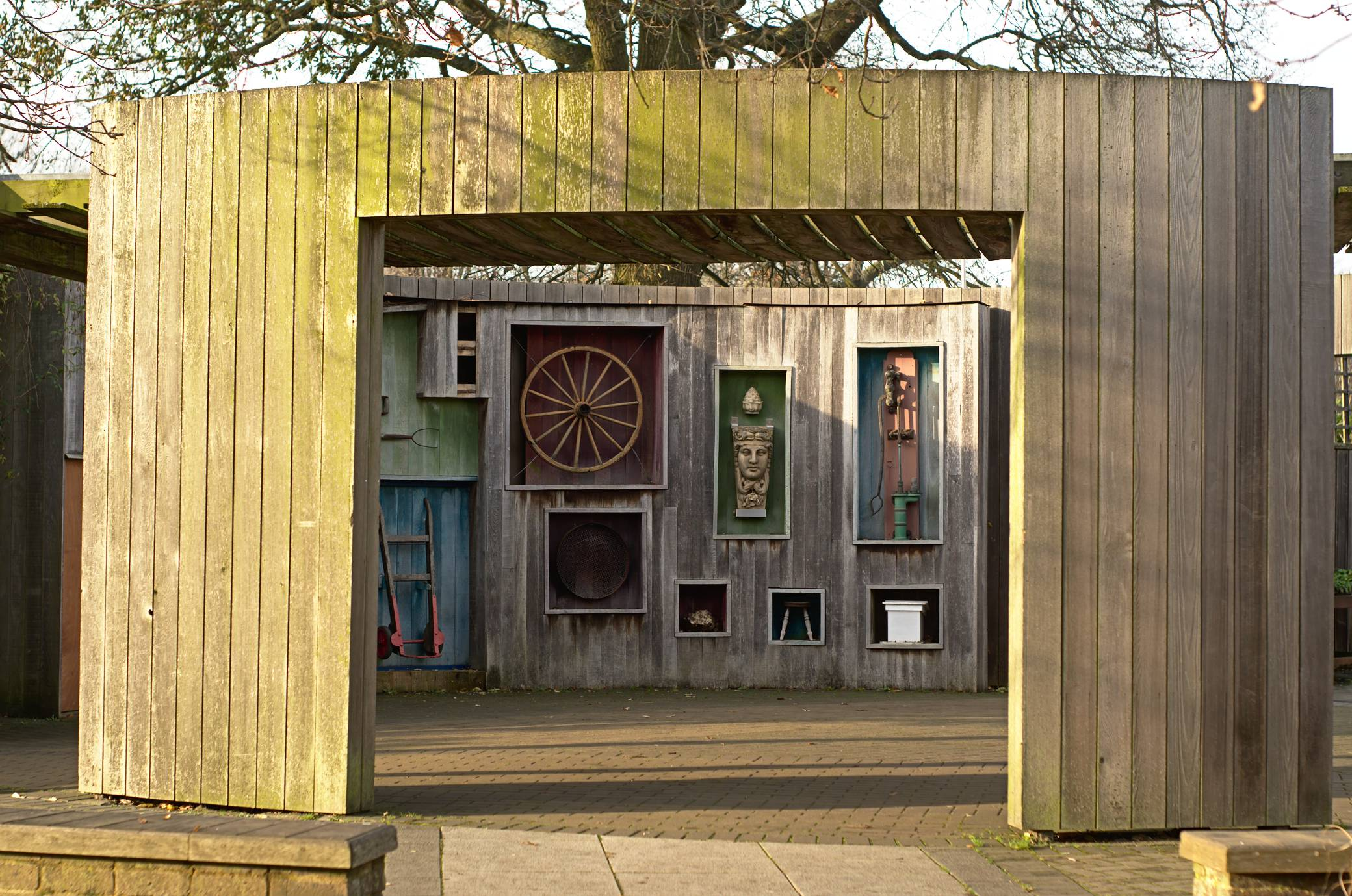
A display at the Stockwood Discovery Centre

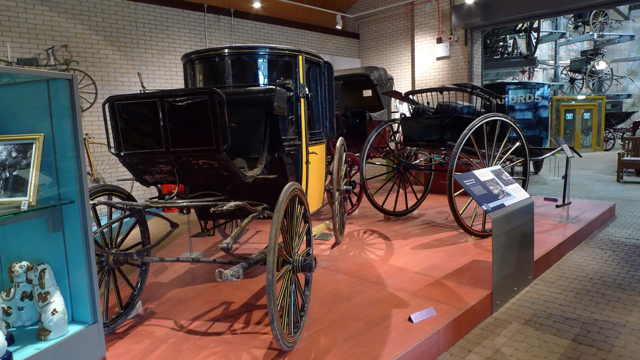
Part of the Mossman Collection

== History ==
Stockwood Park Museum was opened in 1986 and later reopened as Stockwood Discovery Centre in 2008 as part of a £6 million redevelopment.

== Mossman Carriage Collection ==
The Mossman Carriage Collection is a museum housing a collection of horse-drawn vehicles in Stockwood Park. It is the largest collection of such vehicles in the United Kingdom, and includes original vehicles dating from the 18th, 19th and 20th centuries.

== Bagshawe Gallery ==
The collection of rural crafts and trades held at Stockwood Discovery Centre was amassed by Thomas Wyatt Bagshawe who was a notable local historian and a leading authority on folk life. Bagshawe was born in Dunstable in 1901 and became a director of the family engineering firm.

Bagshawe began a small private museum in Dunstable in 1927 and became the honorary curator of Luton Museum in 1928. He later became the museums director.

Thomas Bagshawe and Charles Freeman, who succeeded Bagshawe as curator in 1936, visited many of the Scandinavian museums which were at the forefront of folk life museums in Europe.

Both were heavily influenced by the Scandinavian example and they sought ways to introduce the ideas and methods they had witnessed into Luton Museum. In 1938 a rural industry gallery was opened at Wardown designed on Scandinavian principles with built-in cases and freestanding exhibits.

The museum’s annual report of that year described Luton as being at the centre of a large area that was rapidly being transformed, and that the disappearance of many rural crafts was imminent.

During the 1930s and in the years immediately after World War II, Bagshawe undertook a systematic search of Bedfordshire villages to seek out the surviving crafts folk. He interviewed them and acquired artefacts from them.

Bagshawe also amassed a large amount of notes, photographs and illustrations and carefully classified them all using the Royal Anthropological Institutes British Ethnography Committees system. This gave the collection greater detail than was typical at the time. In addition he donated to the museum his large collection of books on agriculture, local trades, crafts and related topics.

In 1954 Bagshawe offered all his collection to Luton Museum. The archaeology and occupational collections were a gift conditional upon the purchase of his ethnographic collection (furniture, treen, ceramics etc.) as well as the provision of suitable display facilities for the illustration of Bedfordshire occupations. The rural life gallery at Luton Museum remained on display until the 1970s when the then curator decided to change the gallery to one showing aspects of Luton life and history of the town. The collection is now housed in Stockwood Discovery Centre.
