= Mossman Collection =

Museum in Stockwood Park, England

Coordinates: 51°51′50″N 0°25′16″W

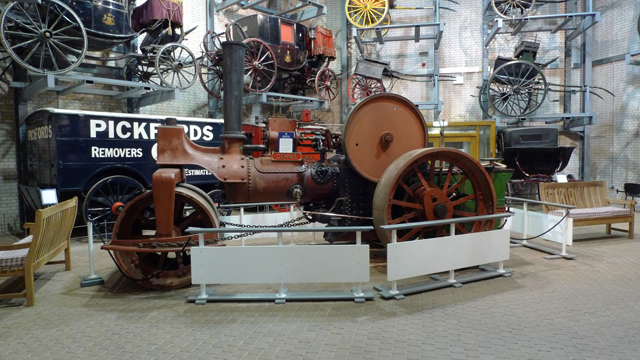
- Established: 1954
- Location: Stockwood Discovery Centre, London Road, Luton LU1 4LX England
- Website: Museum Website

The Mossman Carriage Collection is a museum housing a collection of horse-drawn vehicles in Stockwood Park, Luton, Bedfordshire. It is the largest collection of such vehicles in the United Kingdom, and includes original vehicles dating from the 18th, 19th and 20th centuries.

== Overview ==
The collection was donated to the Luton Museum Service in 1991 (now Stockwood Discovery Centre part of Luton Culture) and has examples of horse-drawn road vehicles and carriages used in Britain dating from Roman times up until the 1930s. The collection has examples of vehicles used by tradesmen and ordinary people as well as luxury vehicles and state coaches used by the British nobility and on the large British estates.

The collection is significant to the people of Luton, Bedfordshire as it documents the life's work and passions of a local man. It is also of national significance as the largest private collection of horse-drawn vehicles.

== History ==
The collection was put together by George Mossman who was born in Luton in 1908. Shortly after the First World War, Mossman left school and started work for a local butcher, Panters, in Park Street, as a delivery driver. This was the beginning of Mossman's lifelong interest in horse-drawn transport.

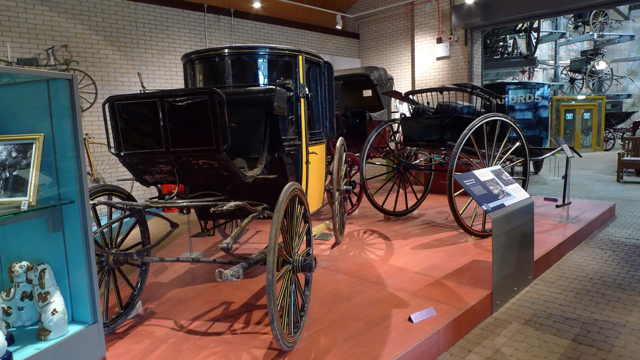
Part of the Mossman Collection

Mossman had a varied working life, running several businesses and a farm. He acquired a leasing company providing horse-drawn carriages for films. The museum houses 54 registered vehicles of Mossman's, as well as carriages from the Luton Museum Services collection. In total there are more than 63 vehicles on display, including original carriages from the 18th to the 20th centuries as well as replicas made for film work in the 20th century.

Unusual vehicles include an 18th-century landau and an early-19th-century barouche, both in very good condition. There is also an 1890s charabanc which dates from the early days of public transportation.

== See also ==
- History of Luton
- Stockwood Discovery Centre
- Wardown Park Museum
