= Woodside Farm and Wildfowl Park =

Coordinates: 51.851°N 0.446°W

- Interactive map of Woodside Farm and Wildfowl Park
- Location: Slip End near Luton, Central Bedfordshire
- Land area: 7 acres (2.8 ha)

Woodside Farm and Wildfowl Park is a rare breeds farm and wildfowl park at Slip End near Luton in Central Bedfordshire.

The park covers 7 acres (28,000 m^{2}) and includes farm animals such as cows, pigs, horses, sheep, goats, chickens, geese, turkeys and ducks, small domestic animals such as rabbits and guinea pigs, and exotic species such as flamingos, monkeys, wallabies, lemurs, rheas, alpacas, giant tortoises, raccoons and llamas. There is also an adventure play area and 18-hole crazy golf.
