= Lists of museums in England =

Lists of museums in England

Museums in England is a link page for any museum in England by ceremonial county. In 2011 there were around 1,600 museums in England. The Museums, Libraries and Archives Council is the national development agency for museums in England, and is a sponsored body of the Department for Culture, Media and Sport.

== See also ==
- List of British railway museums
- List of museums
- Museums in Northern Ireland
- Museums in the Republic of Ireland
- Museums in Scotland
- Museums in Wales
