= Someries Castle =

Fortified manor house in Hyde, Bedfordshire, England

- Near Hyde, Bedfordshire in England
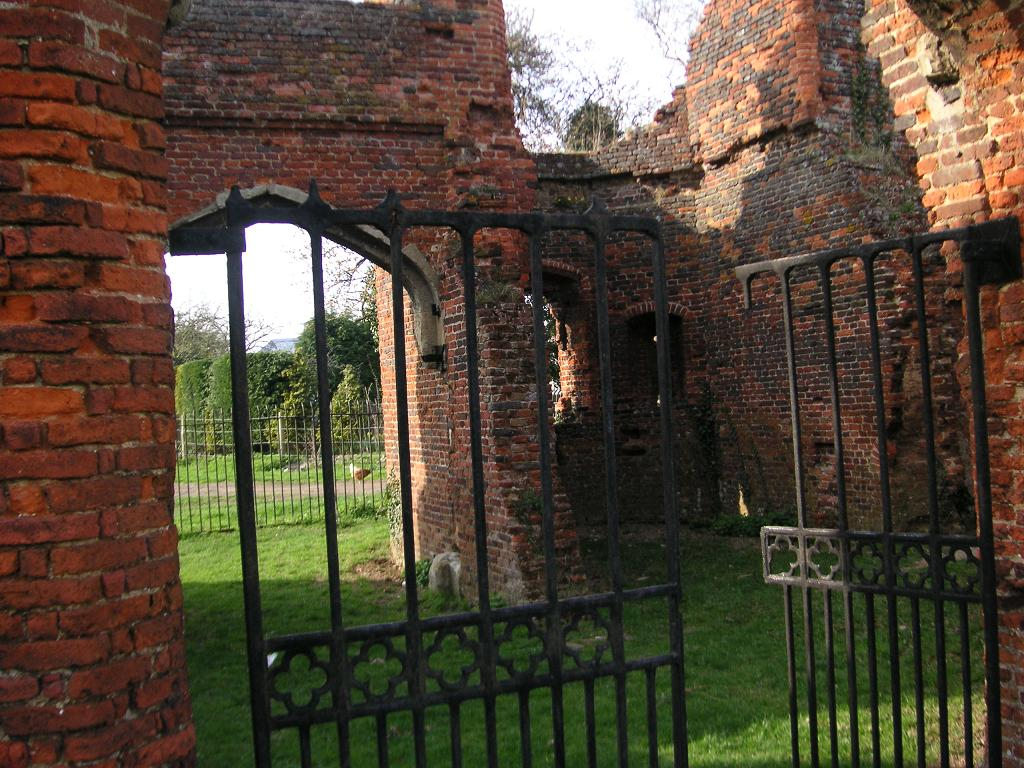

Site information
- Type: Fortified manor house
- Condition: Ruined

Location
- Shown within Bedfordshire
- Coordinates: 51°52′08″N 000°22′33″W grid reference TL539387

Site history
- Built: 1400
- In use: 1400–Present
- Materials: Brick

Someries Castle (sometimes spelt Summeries castle) is a Scheduled Ancient Monument, in the Parish of Hyde, near the town of Luton, Bedfordshire, England.

== History ==
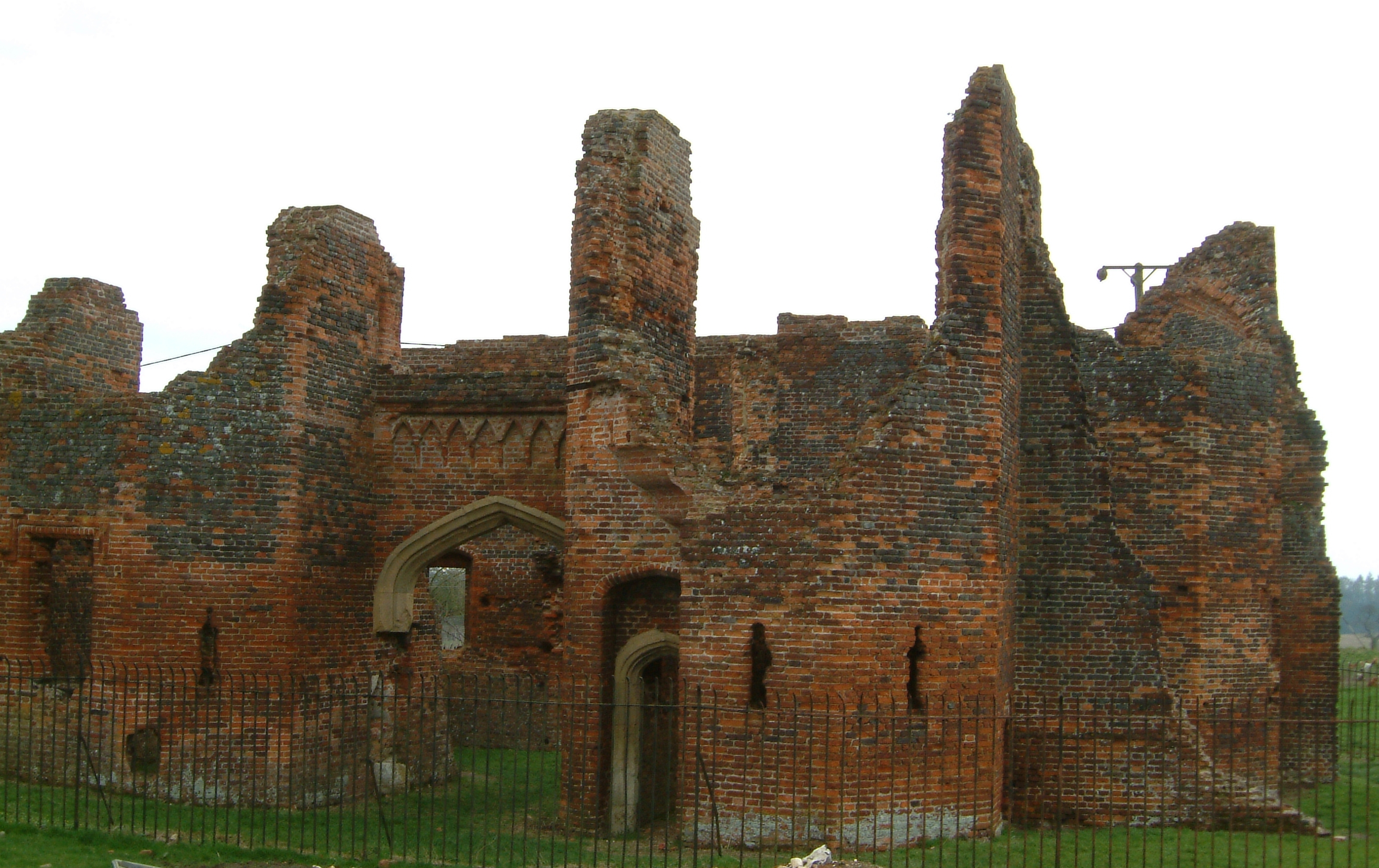
Ruins of Someries Castle, Bedfordshire

It was built in the 15th century by Sir John Wenlock, whose ghost is reputed to haunt the castle. Although always referred to as a castle it was actually a fortified manor house.

The name "Someries Castle" is derived from William de Someries (or Somerys), who had a residence on this site, but the title "castle" is contentious since it hardly describes the structure to which it is applied.

The site was acquired by Wenlock in 1430 and building the mansion commenced. The house is regarded as one of the first brick buildings in England. The house was not completed by Wenlock, as the Tudor historian John Leland noted. Work was halted after Wenlock's death at the battle of Tewkesbury in 1471. The site passed to the Rotheram family. The mansion was partly demolished in the 18th century. The brickwork can still be seen in the remains of the gatehouse, incorporating the chapel and lodge, which still stands.

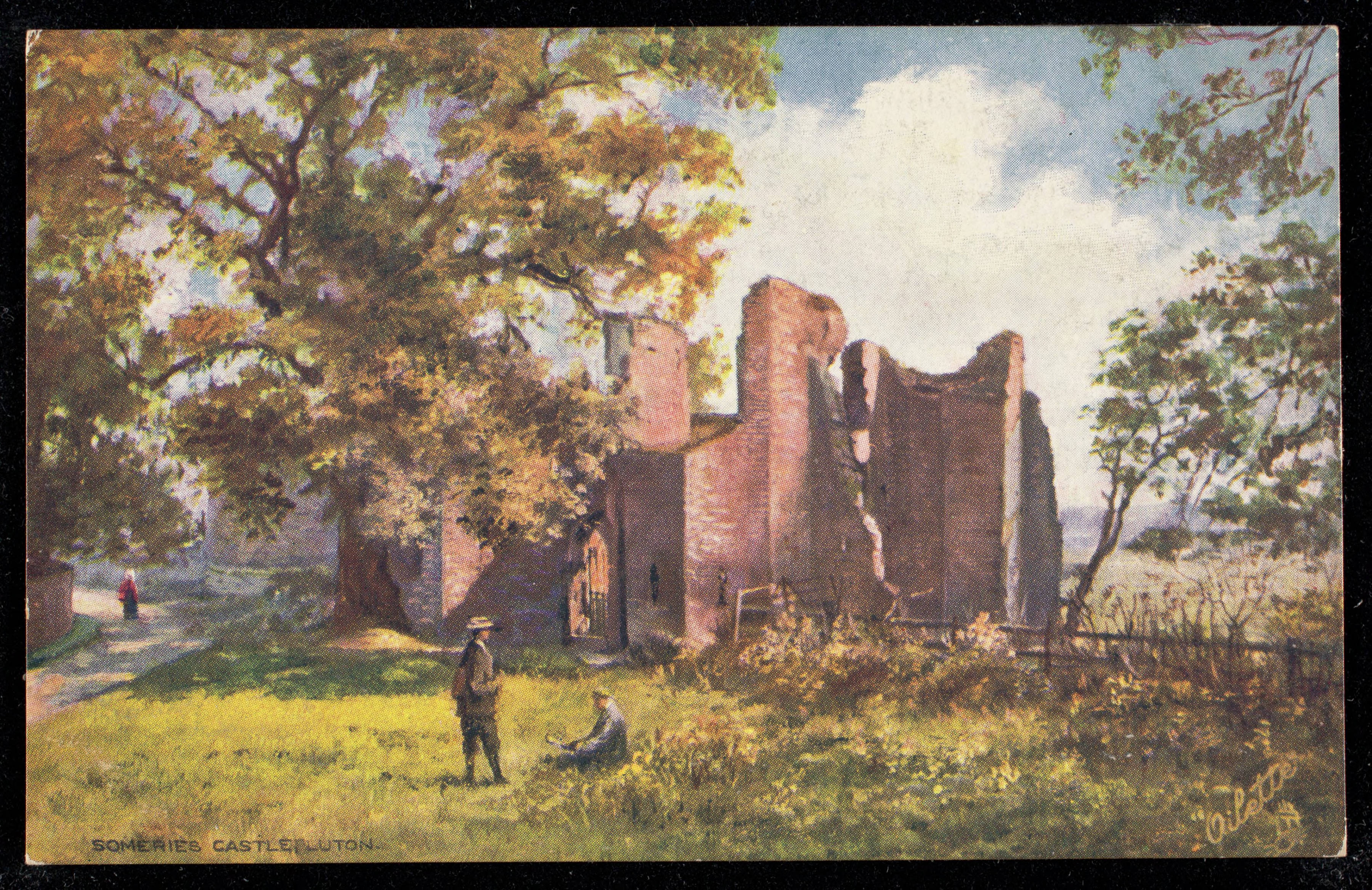
Someries Castle in the early 20th Century.

Earthworks previously thought to originate from an earlier manor house are now considered to relate to the 15th-century mansion's formal garden. Bricks from the mansion have been utilized in nearby 19th-century farm buildings.

=== Present day ===
The castle closed to the public in February 2007 in order to make the structure safe and was surrounded by scaffolding, which damaged the original brickwork. It reopened in 2008.

== See also ==
- Castles in Great Britain and Ireland
- List of castles in England
