= Wardown Park =

Park in Luton, England

Wardown park
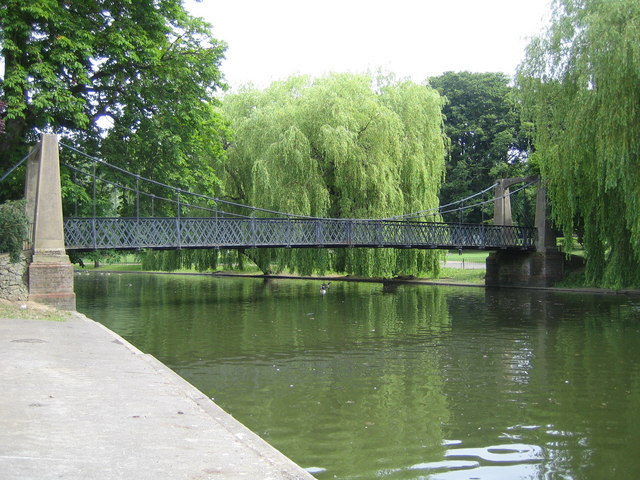
- A pedestrian suspension bridge spans the boating lake created where the River Lea flows through the park
- Interactive map of Wardown park
- Location: Luton, Bedfordshire, England
- Coordinates: 51°53′37″N 00°25′08″W
- Operator: Luton Borough Council
- Status: Open all year

Wardown Park is situated on the River Lea in Luton. The park has various sporting facilities, is home to the Wardown Park Museum and contains formal gardens. The park is located between Old Bedford Road and the A6, New Bedford Road and is within walking distance of the town centre. It is Grade II listed in Historic England's Register of Parks and Gardens.

== History ==
The area that became Wardown Park was a farmhouse and country residence in the 1800s. The park itself started out as a private estate owned by Richard How. Richard's son, Robert built the first property within the park, called Bramingham Shott, which still stands and now houses the museum.

In the early 1870s the estate was taken over by local solicitor, Frank Chapman-Scargill. He rebuilt much of the earlier house in 1879 for a total cost of £10,000. Scargill left Luton and the house and property was let to J Forder who renamed the estate Wardown. Frank Chapman's last surviving son (Jasper Chapman Scargill) died in Ireland 22 October 2012 at the age of 97 (93 years after the death of his father).

By 1903 the then owners (The Stewart Family, whose famous son, Sir Malcolm Stewart, founded the London Brick Company) decided to sell the house and 11-acre (45,000 m^{2}) park, and placed the property up for sale with an asking price of £17,000. The property was not sold, and in 1904 local councillors Asher Hucklesby and Edwin Oakley purchased the property for £16,250 on behalf of Luton council. Hucklesby went on to become Mayor of Luton.

Over the next few years extensive improvements were implemented, many new trees were planted, as well as new footpaths and bridges being constructed. The layout of the park today is very much as it was in this period. A bowling green was built in 1905, reputed to be the first in Luton.

== Features ==
=== Luton Museum ===
It was Hucklesby's dream that the house would become a museum that would be 'interesting as well as of an educational nature'. Unfortunately, the house itself had been neglected and suffered from dry rot, Luton council could not immediately afford the renovations. It remained empty for several years until it became a military hospital during World War I. After the war, rooms were let to council employees with a cafe opening on the ground floor. The museum opened in 1930, having moved from the Carnegie library where it started in 1927. At first the museum displays were held in just two rooms, but over the years it has filled the entire house. The museum is open Tuesdays to Saturdays from 10am to 5pm and Sundays from 1 to 5pm. Admission is free.

=== Lake ===
At the centre of the park is a lake, formed by widening the River Lea during the development of the park in the Victorian era. The lake contains a small island which is not accessible to the public, and is home to various waterfowl, such as swans, ducks and geese. At the end of the lake closest to the town centre is a large fountain. Adjacent to the lake is the recently (2005–06) refurbished children's play park.

During World War II, the nearby Bedford Vehicles Dunstable plant need to waterproof test the trucks that it was building for the British Army in preparation for D-Day. So with permission, it drove them through the lake instead of building a specific test tank.

After WW2, the lake was extended to form an open-air swimming pool, which was in use until the 1950s. Boating on the lake was then introduced, and until the boat-man retired in 2004 you could hire a row-boat in the summer.

=== Daisy Chain wall ===
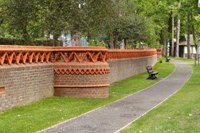
The Daisy Chain Wall.

The Daisy Chain wall is one of the park's most significant design features, named because of the attractive brick pattern that features along the length of the wall.

Believed to have been built around 1905, the wall was part of the original gardens of Wardown House before it was made into a public park. The condition of the Daisy Chain Wall had deteriorated over the years until many of its features were damaged and destroyed, however with extensive re-construction the wall now appears as it did one hundred years ago. The wall separates the main park from the pleasure garden, which was formerly an ornamental garden containing trees such as giant redwoods and an avenue of limes.

The wall runs alongside part of the Daisy Chain Walk, a path connecting the main park with the bowling green, bowling pavilion and the east side of the tennis courts.

== Restoration ==
The restoration of Wardown Park was completed in June 2005, using one million pounds of lottery funding, by the local council as well as the work and contributions of local people. The council and the Friends of Wardown Park, have replaced the old refreshment kiosk with a building mirroring the design of the boathouse. Across the lake from the kiosk is the original boathouse which also underwent restoration with the rest of the buildings of the park. At the same time the Edwardian Daisy Chain wall and drinking fountain were restored using the original designs and old photographs. The drinking fountain is an exact replica of the original based on a photograph from 1907 on display in the museum, however it is a non-working replica.

== Cricket ground ==
Wardown Park
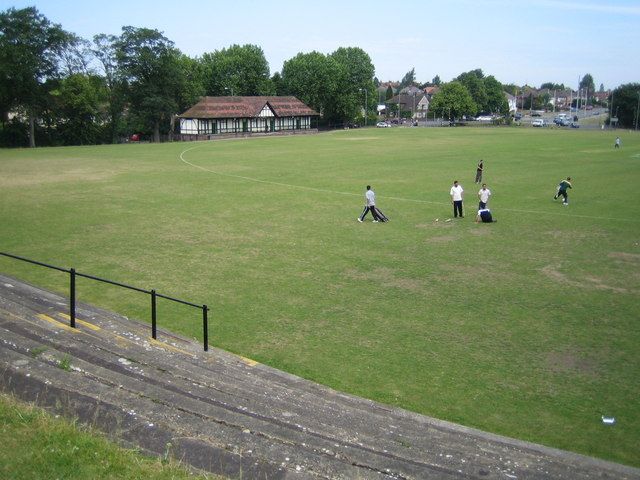
- Interactive map of Wardown Park

Ground information
- Location: Luton, Bedfordshire
- Country: England
- Coordinates: 51.8959°N 0.4177°W
- Establishment: 1906 (first recorded match)
- End names
- Stockingstone End; Pavilion End

Team information
Bedfordshire	(1906–present)
Northamptonshire	(1973–2004)
- As of 25 July 2010; Source: Ground profile

=== History ===
Luton Cricket Club were founded in 1906 and began playing at the Upper Ground in the same year. In the same year Bedfordshire played their first minor counties match at Wardown Park against Buckinghamshire. Wardown Park was used thereafter once a year by Bedfordshire for Minor Counties Championship. List A one-day cricket was first played at the ground in the 1967 Gillette Cup, with Bedfordshire hosting Northamptonshire. Northamptonshire first used Wardown Park as an outground in 1973, when they played a List A match there against Nottinghamshire. Having used the ground as an outground for one-day matches, Northamptonshire first used the ground for first-class cricket in 1986 against Yorkshire in the County Championship. In this match, Northamptonshire's Rob Bailey scored the inaugural double-century at the ground, with an unbeaten 200. Northamptonshire played one first-class match a year at the ground until 1997 and continued to play one-day matches there until 1998. The Minor Counties cricket team used the ground for a home one-day match in the 1998 Benson & Hedges Cup. Northamptonshire returned to Wardown Park in 2004, playing a Twenty20 match against Worcestershire, with Worcestershire's Graeme Hick scoring an unbeaten 116 from 65 balls. Following the end of Northamptonshire's regular use of Wardown Park as an outground, Bedfordshire continued to play List A matches at the ground until the minor counties were excluded from the Cheltenham & Gloucester Trophy in 2005. As of 2026 the ground has hosted 133 Minor Counties Championship matches, five MCCA Knockout Trophy matches, and was due to host four National Counties T20 matches, however these were cancelled due to the COVID-19 pandemic.

The ground is entered from the main park and is encircled by trees. The current pavilion is an extension of an existing building, which still holds the players changing rooms. The buildings near the ground were used during World War II by Civil Defence personnel. A raised viewing area runs along the eastern side of the ground and along the western side is a digital scoreboard. The ground could accommodate crowds of 4,000–5,000 and once accommodated a crowd of 6,000 for a benefit match for Tom Clark in 1961. The cricket ground has also played host to field hockey matches, with the Bedfordshire Eagles playing there. The lower cricket ground has never held county cricket matches and is the homeground of Luton Luctonian Cricket Club.

=== Records ===
==== First-class ====
- Highest team total: 499 for 5 declared by Northamptonshire v Glamorgan, 1992
- Lowest team total: 46 all out by Northamptonshire v Essex, 1995
- Highest individual innings: 200 not out by Rob Bailey for Northamptonshire v Yorkshire, 1986
- Best bowling in an innings: 9–19 by Mark Ilott for Essex v Northamptonshire, 1995
- Best bowling in a match: 14–105 by Mark Ilott, as above

==== List A ====
- Highest team total: 298 for 2 by Northamptonshire v Warwickshire, 1983
- Lowest team total: 81 all out by Northamptonshire v Lancashire, 1989
- Highest individual innings: 172 not out by Wayne Larkins for Northamptonshire v Warwickshire, 1983
- Best bowling in an innings: 5–14 by Franklyn Rose, for Northamptonshire v Minor Counties, 1998

==== Twenty20 ====
- Highest team total: 173 for 5 by Worcestershire v Northamptonshire, 2004
- Lowest team total: 80 for 8 by Northamptonshire v Worcestershire, as above
- Highest individual innings: 116 not out by Graeme Hick for Worcestershire v Northamptonshire, as above
- Best bowling in an innings: 2–15 by David Leatherdale, as above

== Gallery ==
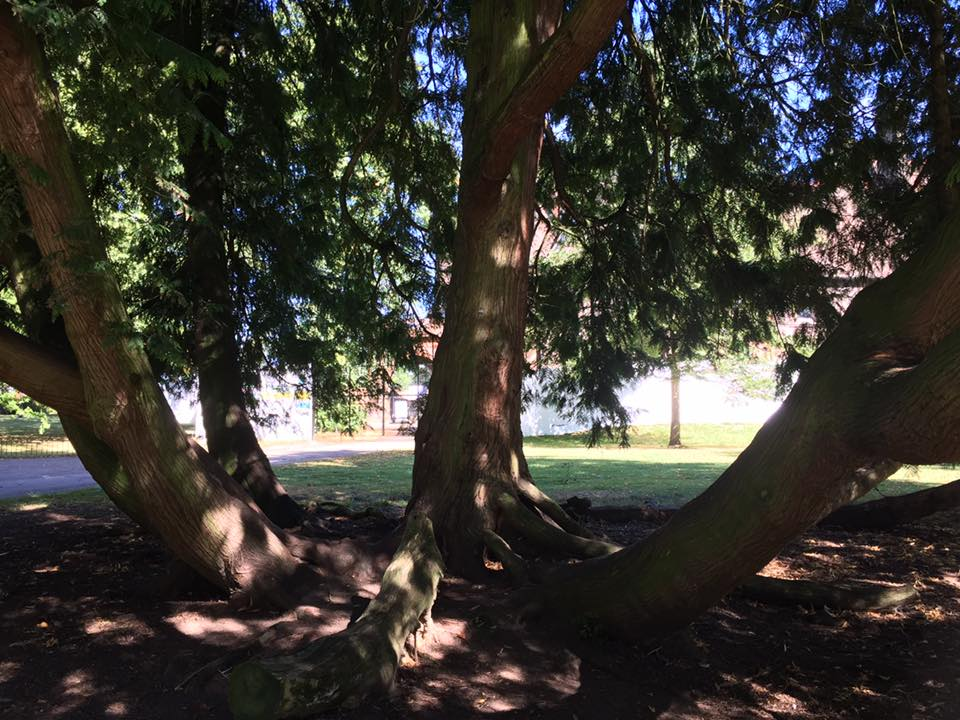
large old trees in Wardown Park, Luton

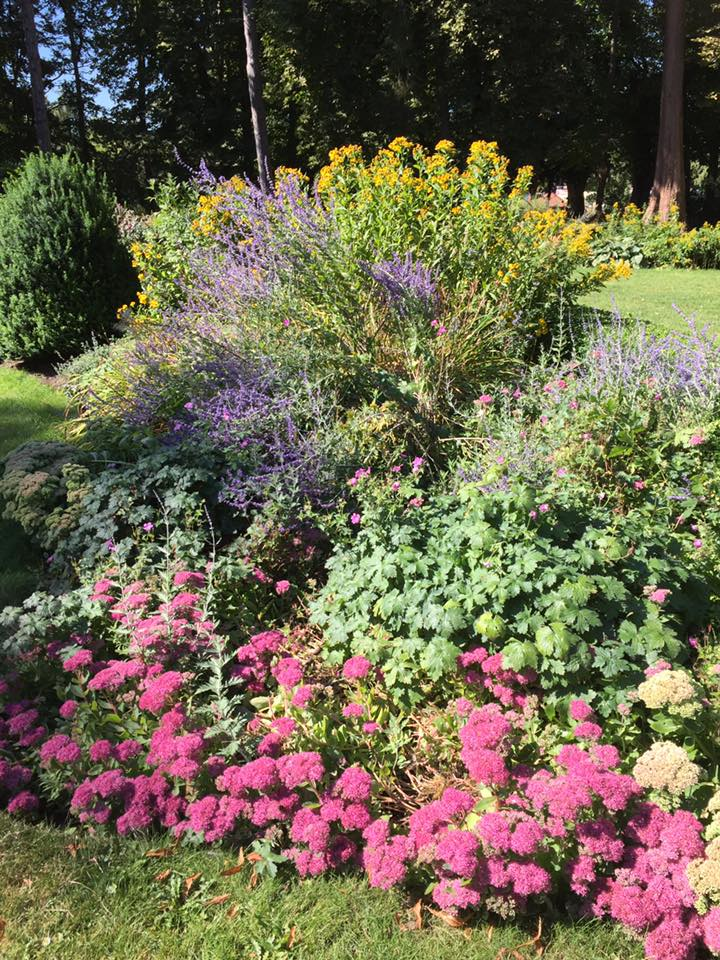
Wardown Park, Luton flower beds outside the museum

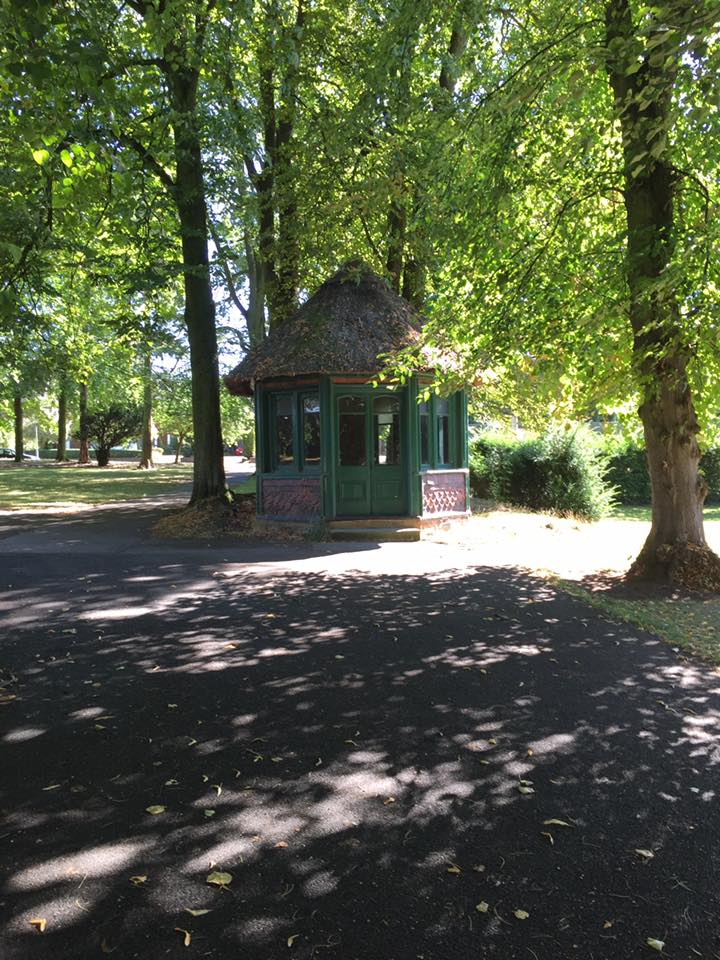
Summer house in Luton

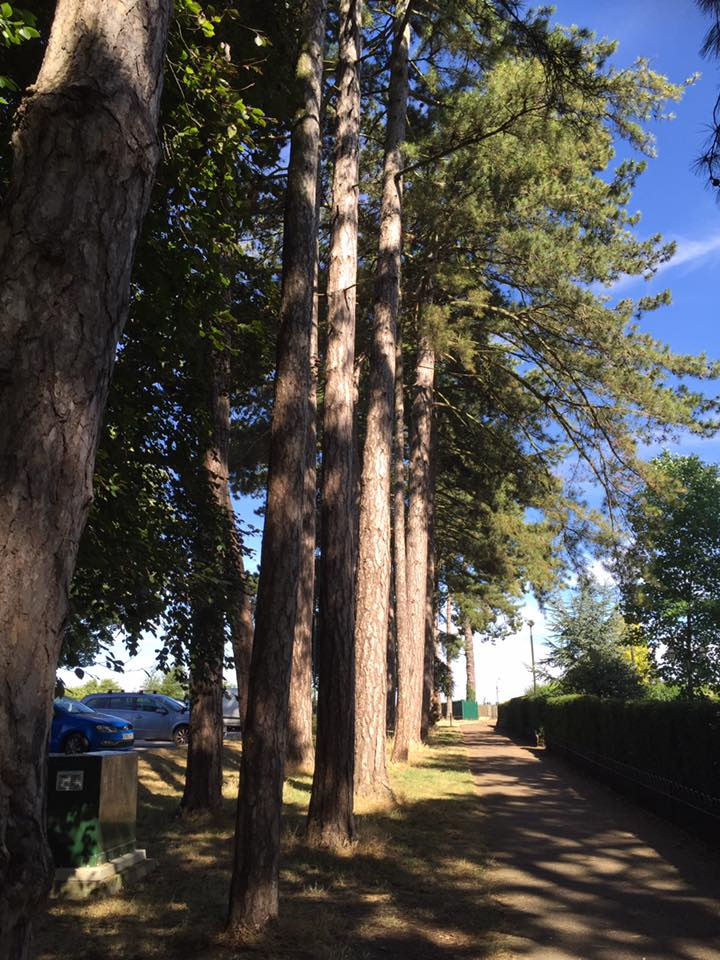
Trees in Wardown Park, Luton

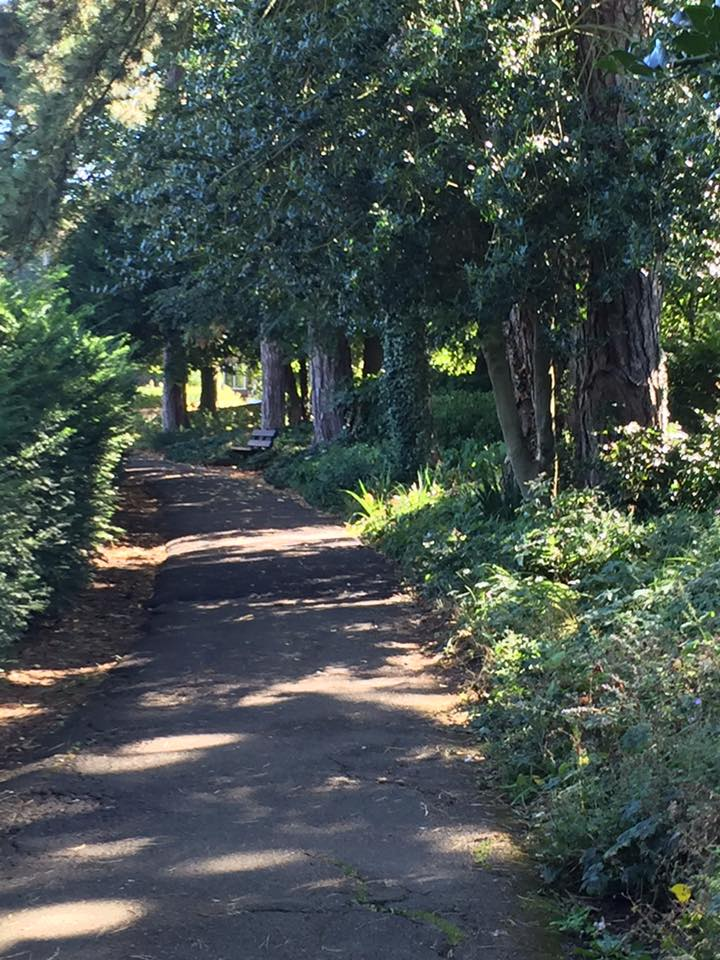
Trees in Wardown Park, Luton
