= History of Luton =

History of the town in Bedfordshire, England

Luton is a town located in the south of Bedfordshire, England.

== Early history ==
The earliest settlements in the Luton area were at Round Green and Mixes Hill, where Paleolithic encampments (about 250,000 years old) have been found. Settlements reappeared after the ice had retreated in the Mesolithic around 8000 BC; settlements have been found in the Leagrave area. Remains from the Neolithic (4500–2500 BC in this area) are much more common. A particular concentration of Neolithic burials is at Galley Hill. The most prominent Neolithic structure is Waulud's Bank, a henge dating from around 3000 BC. From the Neolithic onwards, the area seems to have been fairly thickly populated, but without any single large settlement.

The first urban settlement nearby was the small Roman town of Durocobrivis at Dunstable, but Roman remains in the modern area of Luton itself consist only of scattered farmsteads, with a core of settlement at Limbury with some evidence of substantial buildings, as well as at Wigmore and Park Street.

The foundation of Luton is usually dated to the 6th century when a Saxon outpost was founded on the River Lea, Lea tun.

Luton is recorded in the Domesday Book as Loitone and also as Lintone, when the town's population was around 700–800. Agriculture dominated the local economy at this time.

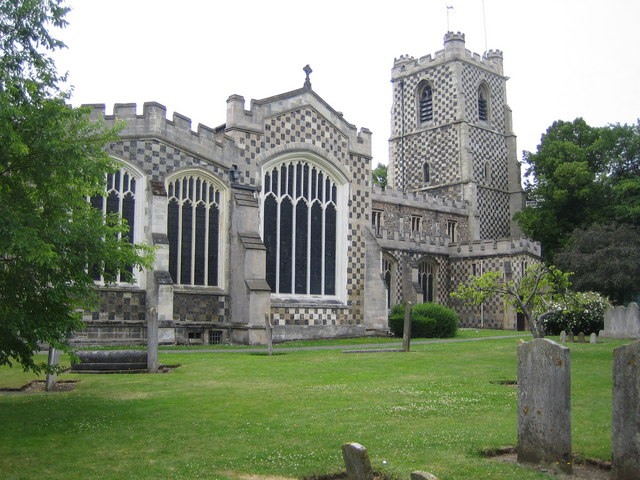
St Mary's Church, Luton town centre

In 1121 Robert, 1st Earl of Gloucester started work on St Mary's Church in the centre of the town, which was completed by 1137. A motte and bailey castle which gives its name to 'Castle Street' was built in 1139 during The Anarchy. The castle was demolished in 1154. The site is now home to Matalan. During the Middle Ages Luton is recorded as being home to six water mills. Mill Street, in the town centre, takes its name from one of them.

King John (1166–1216) had hired a mercenary soldier, Falkes de Breauté, to act on his behalf. (Bréauté is a small town near Le Havre in France.) When he married, he acquired his wife Margaret's London house which came to be known as "Fawkes Hall", subsequently corrupted over the years to "Foxhall", then "Vauxhall". In return for his services, King John granted Falkes the manor of Luton. He was also granted the right to bear his own coat of arms and chose the mythical griffin as his heraldic emblem. The griffin thus became associated with both Vauxhall and Luton in the early 13th century.

By 1240 the town is recorded as Leueton. The town had an annual market for surrounding villages in August each year, and with the growth of the town a second fair was granted each October from 1338.

In 1336, much of Luton was destroyed by a great fire, however the town was soon rebuilt.

The agriculture base of the town changed in the 16th century with a brickmaking industry developing around Luton, many of the older wooden houses were rebuilt in brick.

There were two skirmishes in Luton during the English Civil War. The first was in 1645, seeing Parliamentarian soldiers besetting a traveling group of Cavalier soldiers, killing four and capturing 22.

A second fight was spurred by an army of Calvaliers traveling through the town in 1648. Parliamentarian Roundheads encountered Royalist Cavaliers stragglers in a pub on the corner of Bridge Street. While most of the stragglers escaped, nine were killed.

It was in the 17th century when the hatmaking that became synonymous with the town began. By the 18th century the hatmaking industry, especially straw hat manufacture, dominated the town as its only significant industry. Hats are still produced in the town on a smaller scale.

The first Luton Workhouse was built in 1722. A larger workhouse was built in the town in 1836.

Luton Hoo, a large country house to the south of the town, was built in 1767 on the site of an earlier manor house. Little of the 1767 house remains, as much of it was rebuilt after a fire in 1843. Luton Hoo was originally in the parish of Luton, but boundary changes in 1896 transferred it to the new parish of Hyde.

== 19th century ==
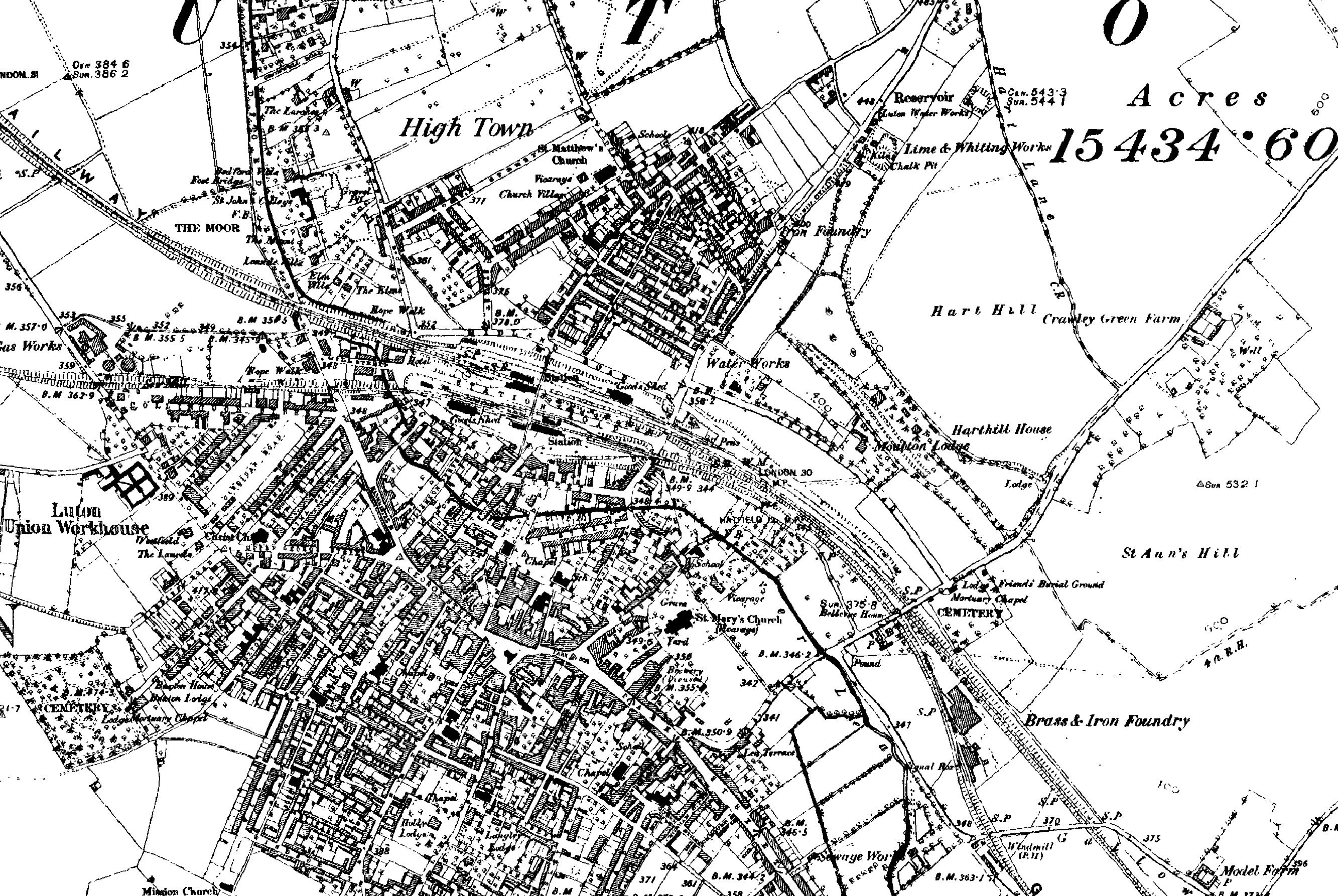
A map of Luton from 1888

The town grew strongly in the 19th century; in 1801 the population was 3,095. By 1850 it was over 10,000 and by 1901 it was almost 39,000. The town was comparatively late to secure a railway connection. The London and Birmingham Railway (L&BR) had been built through Tring in 1838, and the Great Northern Railway was built through Hitchin in 1850, both missing Luton by several miles. A branch line connecting with the L&BR at Leighton Buzzard was proposed, but because of objections to release of land, the branch only reached Luton's neighbour, Dunstable, in 1848. It was another ten years before the branch was extended to Bute Street Station, and the first train from Luton to Dunstable ran on 3 May 1858. The line was later extended to Welwyn as part of the Hatfield, Luton and Dunstable branch line of the Great Northern Railway, and from 1860 direct trains ran to King's Cross. The Midland Railway was extended from Bedford to St Pancras through Leagrave and Midland Road station and opened on 9 September 1867, giving the town a main line connection to London and the Midlands.

Luton had a gas supply in 1834, and the gas street lights were erected and the first town hall opened in 1847.

Newspaper printing arrived in the town in 1854, coincidentally the year the first public cemetery was opened. Following a cholera epidemic in 1848 Luton formed a water company and had a complete water and sewerage system by the late 1860s. The first covered market was built (the Plait Halls, now demolished) in 1869. Luton was made a borough in 1876 and the football club was founded in 1885 following the passing of a resolution at the Town Hall that the "Luton Town Club be formed".

== 20th century ==
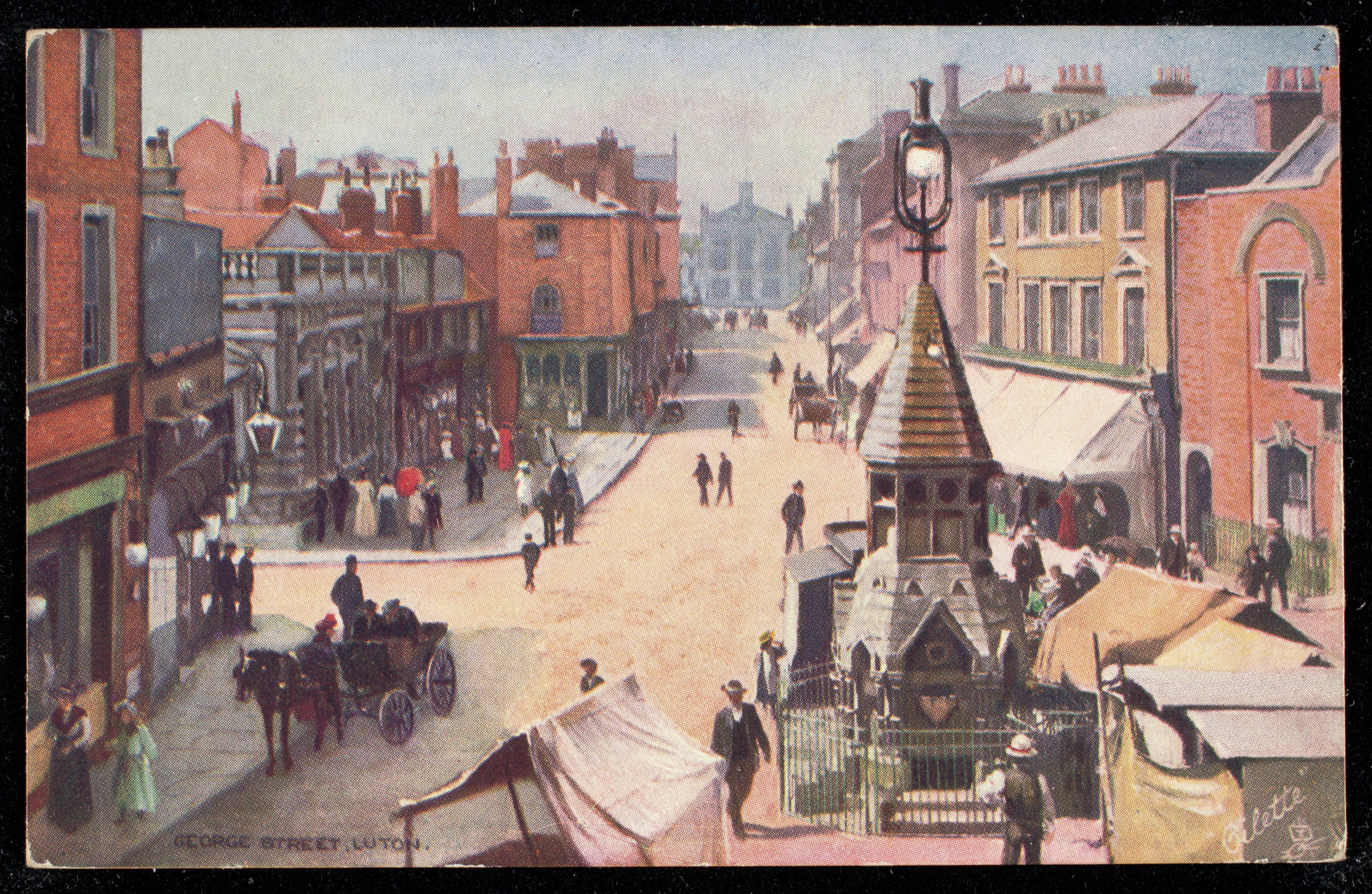
George Street, looking North West towards the town hall in the early 20th Century

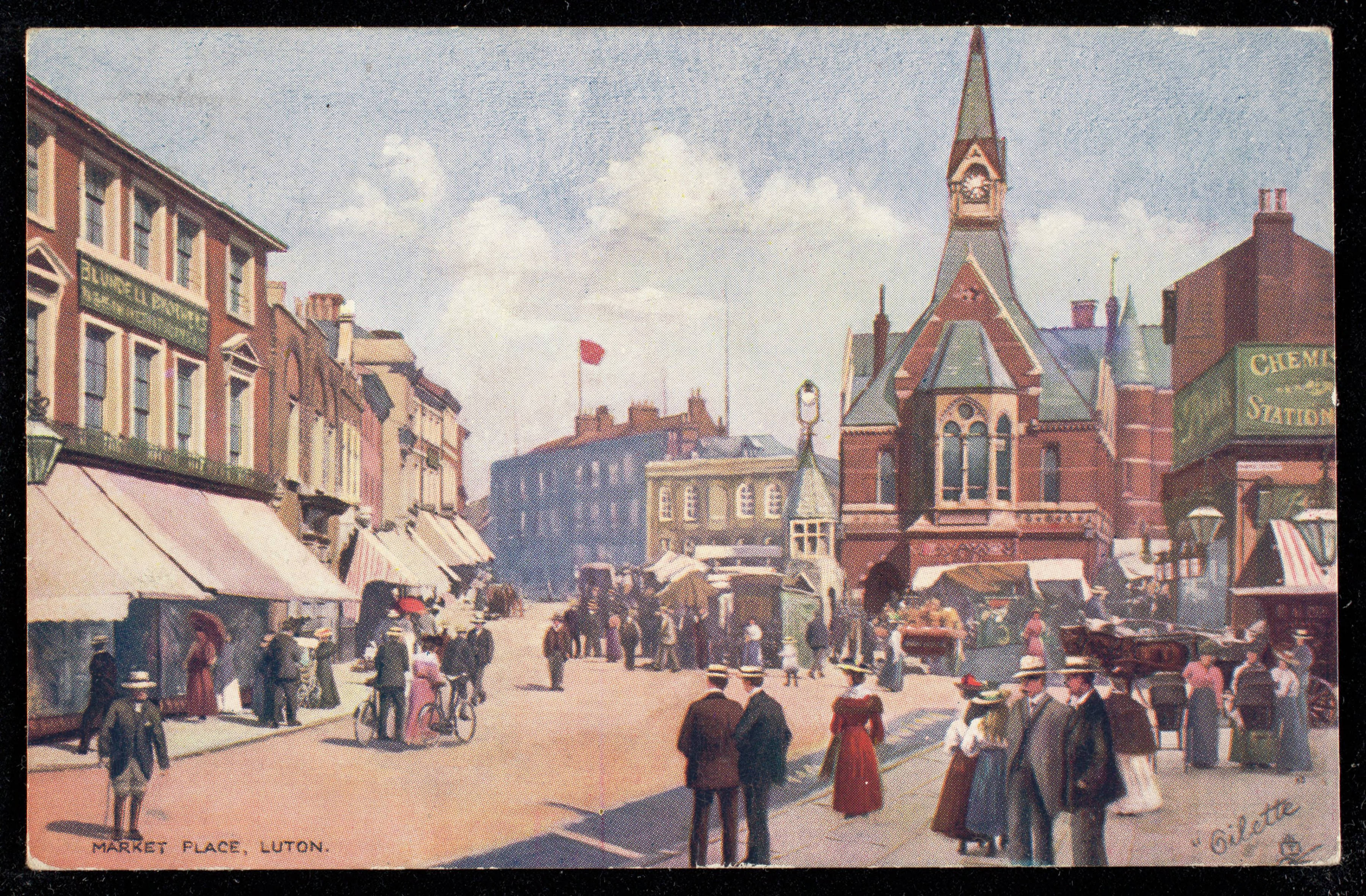
George Street, looking South East towards market hill in the early 20th Century.

In the 20th century, the hat trade severely declined and was replaced by more modern industries. In 1905, Vauxhall Motors opened the largest car plant in the United Kingdom in Luton. In 1914 Hewlett & Blondeau built an aircraft manufacturing plant in Leagrave which later became Electrolux in 1926, which set the precedent for further light manufacturing businesses in the town.

In 1904 councillors Asher Hucklesby and Edwin Oakley purchased the estate that became Wardown Park, and then donated the property to the people of Luton. Hucklesby went on to be Mayor of Luton. The main house became Luton Museum, whilst the grounds became one of the town's main public parks.

The town had a tram system from 1908 until 1932 and the first cinema was opened in 1909. A Carnegie Library opened in the town in 1910, built to the cost of £10,000 and the opening ceremony was attended by US Ambassador Whitelaw Reid and Andrew Carnegie himself. By 1914, the population had reached 50,000.

The original town hall was destroyed in 1919 during the Peace Day celebrations at the end of the First World War; local people including many ex-servicemen were unhappy with unemployment and had been refused the use of a local park to hold celebratory events, and so stormed the town hall setting it on fire. (See Luton Town Hall) A replacement town hall was completed in 1936. Luton Airport opened in 1938, owned and operated by the council.

In World War II, the Vauxhall Factory built Churchill tanks as part of the war effort and was heavily camouflaged. The Vauxhall factory made Luton a target for the Luftwaffe and the town suffered a number of air raids, in which 107 people died. There was extensive physical damage to the town and over 1,500 homes were damaged or destroyed. Other industry in the town such as SKF (producing ball bearings), made a vital contribution to the war effort. Although a bomb landed at the SKF Factory no major damage was inflicted.

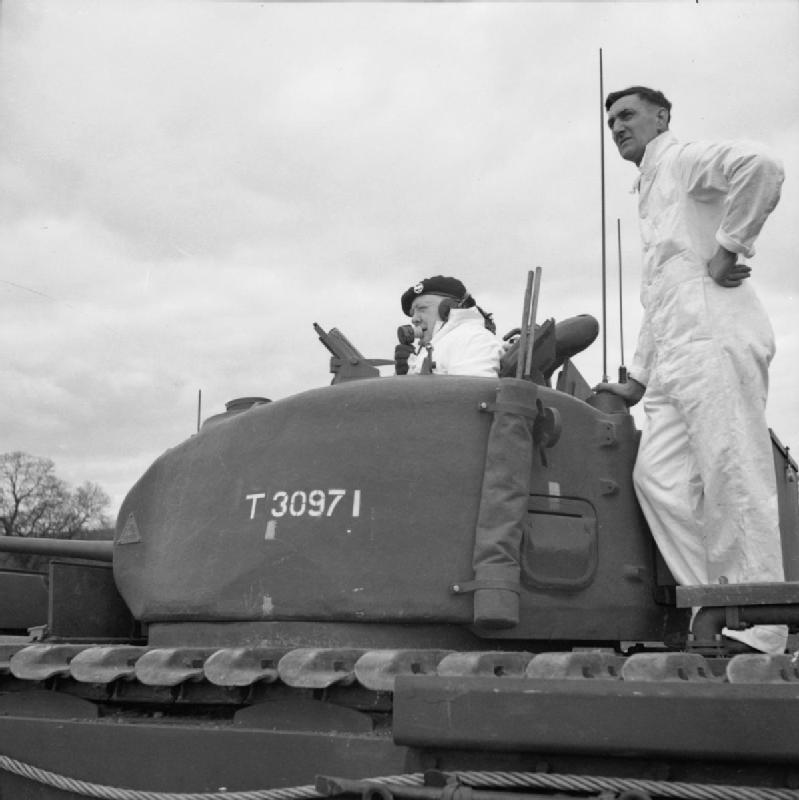
Winston Churchill in a Churchill tank during a visit to Luton

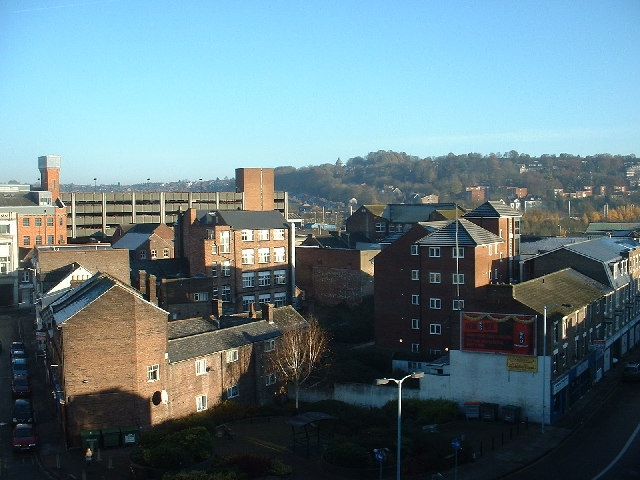
Luton Town Centre

After World War II, there was a programme of slum clearance in the older inner suburbs of the town, whilst a number of substantial estates of council housing were built, notably at Farley Hill, Stopsley, Limbury, Marsh Farm, Leagrave, and (Hockwell Ring). The M1 opened in 1959, skirting the western edge of the town. In 1962 a new library (to replace the Carneige Library) was opened by the Queen in the corner of St George's Square. In the late 1960s a large part of the town centre was cleared to build a covered shopping centre, the Arndale Centre, which was opened in 1972. The Arndale Centre was renamed The Mall Luton in 2006. Since 2024 it has been known as Luton Point.

In 1993 the town's higher education college became the University of Luton. Following mergers with other institutions, this became the University of Bedfordshire in 2006.

A new station was opened at Luton Airport Parkway in 1999.

In 2000, Vauxhall announced the end of car production in Luton; the plant closed in March 2002. At its peak it had employed in excess of 30,000 people.

== 21st century ==
The Mall was substantially extended and the adjoining St George's Square remodelled between 2007 and 2013.

The Luton to Dunstable Busway opened in 2013, re-using the route of the former Hatfield, Luton and Dunstable Railway.

On the edge of Luton, near to Putteridge Bury a new high-technology office park was built in the 2010s, called Butterfield Green. The former Vauxhall site is being re-developed as a mixed use site called Napier Park.

Population since 1801 – Source: A Vision of Britain through Time
Year	1801	1851	1901	1911	1921	1931	1941	1951	1961	1971	1981	1991	2001	2011
Population Luton	2,985	11,067	31,981	49,315	57,378	66,762	84,516	106,999	132,017	162,928	163,208	174,567	184,390	203,201

== Archaeological excavations ==
An archaeological excavation was undertaken before the redevelopment of the Park Square campus, University of Bedfordshire. Records indicate that this area was the site of a castle built by Fulk de Breauté, an Anglo-Norman knight and favourite of King John, some time between 1216 and 1221. One Medieval document shows that the castle was surrounded by a moat, as there was a complaint that de Breauté had dammed the nearby river (presumably to help keep water in the moat) and caused serious flooding to crops and buildings belonging to the church. De Breauté was one of the most powerful men in the kingdom at the time, so was not overly worried by the complaints and allegedly said that he wished that the damage had been worse.

Although called a castle, this building was probably more like a fortified manor house, surrounded by a moat and earthen bank. In the interior would have been living quarters, a great hall, stables and outbuildings. The line of the moat and bank was still visible in the 19th century and seems to have been rectangular in shape. Previous excavations revealed the line of the moat on the northwest side and found traces of timber buildings.

Underneath the demolished Student Union were the remains of 19th century buildings and below these, well preserved medieval features: ditches, postholes and large pits. Finds included clothes pins and pottery dating to the 12–13th centuries confirming the activity was contemporary with Falks de Breauté's castle.

The majority of the pottery were Hertfordshire Greyware which date to 12th – early 13th centuries. Hertfordshire Greyware is the local pottery of the period, and there were at least two pottery kilns making this close to Luton; at Hitchin and to the east of Toddington.

Waulud's Bank archaeological excavations in 1953, 1971 and 1982 date the site to around 3000 BC, in the Neolithic period, although there was evidence of earlier mesolithic hunting and fishing activity in the immediate area.

== Administrative history ==
Luton
- Local Board District (1850–1876); Municipal Borough (1876–1964); County Borough (1964–1974)
- History
  - Created: 19 June 1850
  - Abolished: 31 March 1974
  - Succeeded by: Luton Borough Council
- Status: Local Board District (1850–1876); Municipal borough (1876–1964); County borough (1964–1974)
  - HQ: Luton

The ancient parish of Luton was the largest in Bedfordshire, covering some 15,435 acres (62.5 km^{2}). The parish vestry was the principal body of local government for the area from medieval times until the nineteenth century. The parish of Luton was part of Flitt hundred.

Under the Poor Law Amendment Act 1834 a Luton Poor Law Union was established on 16 April 1835, covering the parish of Luton and a number of nearby parishes, mostly in southern Bedfordshire, but including parts of Hertfordshire. A large new workhouse was built on Dunstable Road, opening in 1836.

On 19 June 1850 a Local Board of Health was created for the town, being the town's first form of urban local government. The local board district only covered the township (effectively the built-up area of the town itself) and did not include the rest of the larger parish of Luton. After elections, the board held its first meeting on 12 August 1850 at the Cock Inn, and John Waller was appointed the first chairman.

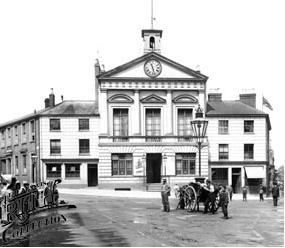
Luton Town Hall (1847–1919)

A Town Hall had been built in 1847 in a prominent position at the northern end of George Street, the town's main thoroughfare. It had been built by a private company but was later rented for meetings by the local board. The local board later purchased the building in 1874.

Under the Public Health Acts of 1872 and 1875, urban and rural sanitary districts were created. The Luton Local Board (based at the Town Hall) acted as the urban sanitary authority for the town itself, whilst the Luton Board of Guardians (based at the Workhouse) acted as the rural sanitary authority for the rest of the poor law union, including the rural parts of Luton parish outside the local board district.

On 25 February 1876 Luton became a municipal borough. The new borough's area was based on the local board district with minor adjustments, particularly along the southern boundary. The old local board's functions were taken over by the new borough council.

The new borough council held its first meeting at the Town Hall on 25 May 1876. The first mayor of the borough was William Bigg, a Liberal. The previous year's chairman of the local board, George Charles Gostelow Lockhart, a Conservative, stood for election but initially failed to win a seat on the new council.

A coat of arms was granted to the new council on 25 July 1876.

Under the Local Government Act 1894, parish councils were created, taking over the remaining secular functions of the vestries. Parishes such as Luton which straddled a borough and a rural sanitary district were to be split, and parish councils only created for the area outside the borough. The parts of Luton parish outside the borough were initially placed in a parish called Luton Rural, which formed part of the similarly named but larger Luton Rural District. The parish of Luton Rural only existed for just over a year between December 1894 and March 1896, being split into four civil parishes called Leagrave, Limbury, Stopsley and Hyde on 1 April 1896.

After the Town Hall burned down in the Peace Day riots on 19 July 1919, the council used temporary premises in the town for the next seventeen years. The lecture theatre in the town's Carnegie library acted as the council chamber for much of this time. A new town hall was eventually built on the site of the old building, opening in 1936.

In 1928 the parishes of Leagrave and Limbury were abolished, being absorbed back into Luton as part of the borough. The parish of Stopsley followed suit in 1933.

Luton became a County Borough on 1 April 1964, operating all local government functions independently of Bedfordshire County Council, whilst remaining part of Bedfordshire for ceremonial purposes. From 1 April 1974, under the Local Government Act 1972, Luton became a non-metropolitan district, with Bedfordshire County Council once more taking responsibility for some services in the town. In 1997 Luton Borough Council was made a unitary authority, becoming once more independent of Bedfordshire County Council (which would later be abolished in 2009).

== See also ==
- Luton power station
