= Lewsey Brook =

Stream in Bedfordshire, England

Coordinates: 51.8998°N 0.4808°W

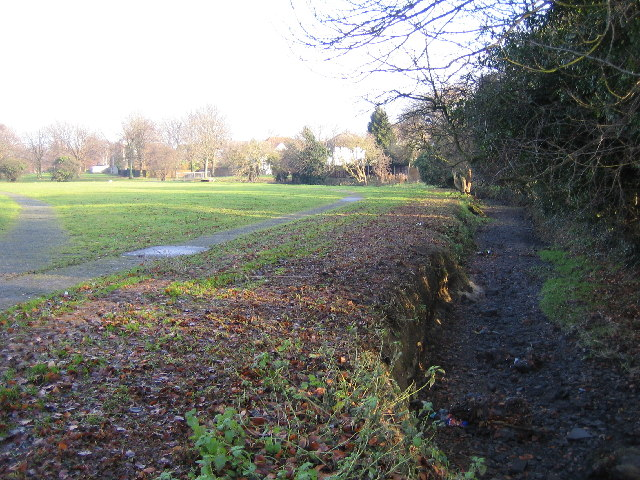
Lewsey Brook, Luton

Lewsey Brook is a minor tributary of the River Lea which flows through Luton.

== Course ==
Course of the Lewsey Brook

Lewsey Brook is a temporal water course, supplied by surface water from farmland and the nearby Luton suburbs of Lewsey, Lewsey Farm, and Lewsey Park, that enters the channel through a culvert. During periods of heavy rain, water floods areas of the nearby Lewsey Park.

Lewsey Brook enters the River Lea via the Houghton Brook (Knapps Brook) at Toddington Road in Leagrave village. The brook is most easily viewed in Lewsey Park in Luton.
