= Lewsey Park =

Area of Luton, England

Coordinates: 51.904°N 0.484°W

- Location within Bedfordshire
- OS grid reference: TL 04361 23921
- Unitary authority: Luton
- Ceremonial county: Bedfordshire
- Region: East
- Country: England
- Sovereign state: United Kingdom
- Post town: LUTON
- Postcode district: LU4
- Dialling code: 01582
- Police: Bedfordshire
- Fire: Bedfordshire
- Ambulance: East of England
- UK Parliament: Luton North

Lewsey Park is a suburb of Luton, Bedfordshire, England. Situated in the north-west of the town, the area is roughly bounded by Woodside Link to the North, Leagrave High Street to the south, Pastures Way to the west, and the M1 to the east.

== History ==
Lewsey Park takes its name from the public park within its boundaries, which is also called Lewsey Park. The parkland takes its name from the neighbouring suburb of Lewsey, which in turn takes its name from a corruption of the “Lucy” family. The Lucy family owned the manor to which the land belonged from 1305 to 1455.

Lewsey Park was built in the late 1980s and 1990s infilling between Hockwell Ring and Lewsey Farm. It is characterised by the many closed and dead end roads of that era of estate design. More open than areas built in previous decades, Lewsey Park consists of mainly detached and semi-detached large houses, many with dormer windows or a tiled upper front façade.

== Local area ==
At the centre of the area is a leisure centre called Lewsey Sports Park, which houses a swimming pool, gym, boxing facility and café. Next door is The Club, a bar and club for the community. Across the road there is also a corner shop.

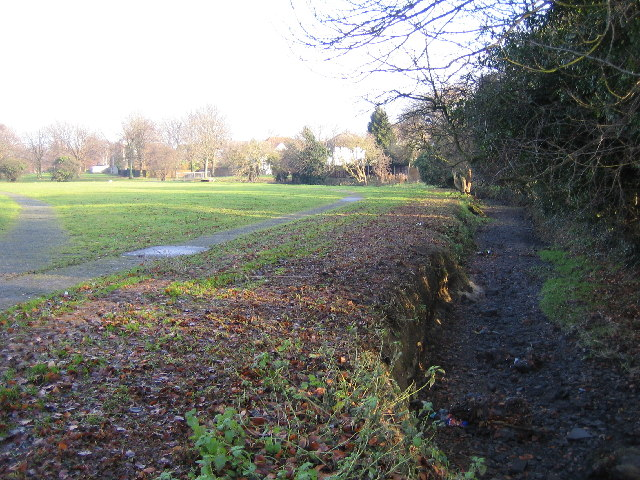
Lewsey Brook

In the south of the area is Lewsey Park (confusingly given the same name as the suburb which surrounds it). The park is a large area containing sports pitches, allotments and a play park. Lewsey Brook is a temporal water course which is a minor tributary to the River Lea and passes through the park.

== Schools ==
- St. Martin de Porres Catholic Primary School

== Politics ==
Lewsey Park is part of the larger Lewsey ward, which also includes Lewsey Farm and Lewsey. The ward is represented by Cllr Jacqui Burnett (Labour), Cllr Aslam Khan (Labour) and Council leader Cllr Hazel Simmons (Labour).

The ward forms part of the parliamentary constituency of Luton North and the MP is Sarah Owen (Labour).

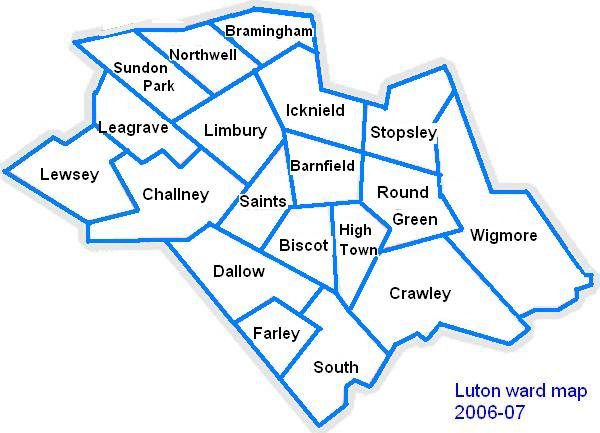
Map of Luton showing Lewsey

== Local attractions ==
Key
	Abbey/Priory/Cathedral
Accessible open space	Accessible open space
	Amusement/Theme Park
	Castle
Country Park	Country Park
	English Heritage
	Forestry Commission
Heritage railway	Heritage railway
Historic house	Historic House
Places of Worship	Places of Worship
Museum (free) Museum	Museum (free/not free)
National Trust	National Trust
	Theatre
	Zoo

- Chiltern Hills
- Dunstable Downs
- The Hat Factory
- Leagrave Park
- Leighton Buzzard Light Railway
- Lewsey Park
- Luton Hoo
- Luton Museum & Art Gallery
- Mossman Collection
- Someries Castle
- Stockwood Craft Museum
- Stockwood Park
- Wardown Park
- Waulud's Bank
- Whipsnade Tree Cathedral
- Whipsnade Wildlife Park
- Woodside Farm and Wildfowl Park
- Wrest Park Gardens

== Local newspapers ==
Two weekly newspapers cover Lewsey Park, although they are not specific to the area.

- Herald and Post
- Luton News
