= Houghton Brook =

Stream in Bedfordshire, England

Coordinates: 51.9084°N 0.4603°W

Houghton Brook Knapps Brook
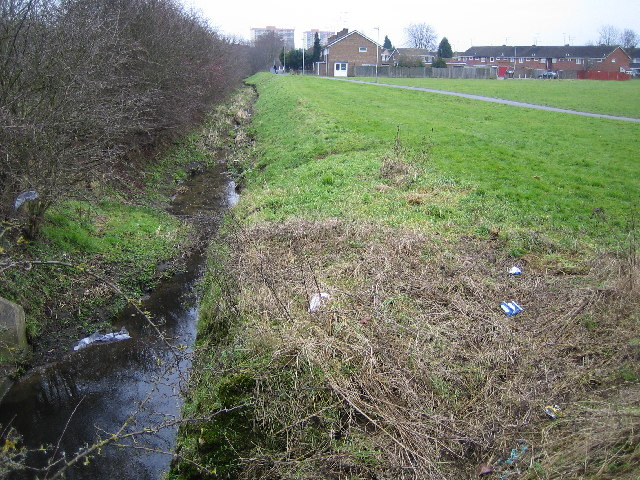
- The Houghton Brook in Leagrave

Physical characteristics
- Source
  - location: Houghton Regis
- Mouth: River Lea
  - location: Leagrave Park, Luton

Houghton Brook, the lower section sometimes known as Knapps Brook, is a minor tributary of the River Lea which flows through the northwest suburbs of Luton.

Houghton Brook starts in Houghton Regis and is fed by a number of smaller brooks in the area, mostly supplied by surface water from farmland and the various local villages and housing estates.

== Course ==
Course of the Houghton Brook

The Houghton Brook starts behind the Pavilion on Houghton Regis Village Green and flows through the Luton suburbs of Houghton Regis, Lewsey, Hockwell Ring, and Leagrave. It is joined by the Lewsey Brook before flowing into the River Lea just below its source in Leagrave Park.
