= Marsh Farm =

Suburb of Luton, England

Coordinates: 51°55′01″N 00°27′11″W

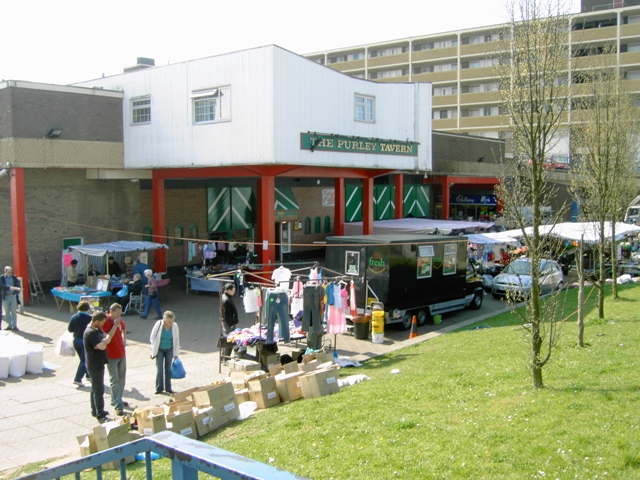
- The back of the former Purley Centre, showing the front of the Purley Tavern pub and the marketplace

- Location within Bedfordshire
- Population: 10,000 (est.)
- OS grid reference: TL0523
- Unitary authority: Luton
- Ceremonial county: Bedfordshire
- Region: East
- Country: England
- Sovereign state: United Kingdom
- Post town: LUTON
- Postcode district: LU3
- Dialling code: 01582
- Police: Bedfordshire
- Fire: Bedfordshire
- Ambulance: East of England
- UK Parliament: Luton North

Marsh Farm is a suburb of Luton, Bedfordshire, England, near to Leagrave and Limbury, mainly of council and social housing. The area is bounded by the edge of Luton to the north, Bramingham Road to the south, Spinney Wood and the path from the wood to the edge of Luton to the west, and Great Bramingham wood to the east.

== Etymology ==
The estate takes its name from the farm that owned much of the land that eventually became the estate. Marsh Farm was located by Leagrave Marsh and part of the old farmland is now Leagrave Park.

== History ==
The estate was built in the late 1960s, with a mixture of flats and houses as part of the post-war expansion of Luton, mostly for overspill population rehoused from London. The estates at Farley Hill, Hockwell Ring and Stopsley were all built at about the same time. The council-owned tower blocks that dominate the estate are called Lea Bank, Penhill and Five Springs, each is of a similar design and are 15 floors each reaching a total height of 44.2 m (145 ft).

== Local area ==
=== The Purley Centre ===
The Purley Centre was a council-owned shopping centre that contained the Marsh Farm Library and local business, such as supermarkets, a pub named The Purley Tavern and restaurants, and a multi-storey block of flats adjacent. It was the host of a marketplace that took place on Thursdays and Saturdays; it was opposite Marsh Farm Futures House, a former factory-turned local community centre.

=== Transport ===
Marsh Farm is well connected by bus with regular services to Luton Town Centre. The estate benefits from the M1 as well as connections to the A6. Luton Airport is within 7 miles.

Leagrave railway station is a 20-minute walk from Marsh Farm and there are frequent trains to Luton, St Albans, Bedford, London, Brighton and Sevenoaks. Arriva run their 4, 4A, 5 and 6 services through the estate, whilst Centrebus provide connections with their bus route '10' service to the Town Centre.

=== Local schools and education ===
Primary Schools

- Waulud Primary School, Wauluds Bank Drive
- Whitefield Primary Academy, (Note: Formerly "Whitefield Primary School".) Stockholm Way

Secondary schools

- Lea Manor High School and community college, Northwell Drive
- Lealands High School, Sundon Park Road
- Woodlands Secondary School, Northwell Drive

Library

- Marsh Farm Library, Lea Manor High School (Note: Originally located at The Purley Centre, it was moved and opened in Lea Manor High School in 2011.)

=== Religion ===
The estate lies within the ecclesiastical benefice of The Holy Cross, Marsh Farm and is served by the Parish Church of the Holy Cross (Church of England) built in 1976 and located in the centre of the estate adjacent to the medical centre on Vadis Close. The Parish is registered with Forward in Faith and is Anglo-Catholic in its theology and worship. The Roman Catholic Church of The Holy Family is located off Northwell Drive and is one of the largest parishes in the Diocese of Northampton. During the season of Lent both Churches join in the Stations of the Cross.

== Marsh Farm Riots ==
Marsh Farm made national news in July 1995 when the social problems boiled over into three days of rioting. Although local police received the help of the Metropolitan Police riot squad to bring the situation under control, it was the rave organisers Exodus Collective who brought the riots to an end by staging an impromptu party out of town which drew 2,000 young people from the area and calmed them down. The riots also resulted in a policeman being stabbed, all of the estate's public buildings being vandalised or set alight, cars were stolen and then set alight by joyriders as young as 12. A less notorious riot also occurred on the estate in July 1992.

== Notable figures ==
Nicholas Prosper, who murdered his mother and two siblings and planned to murder children of a nearby school, lived, and was raised in Marsh Farm.

Andrew Tate spent his formative years living on the Marsh Farm estate.

Stephen Kelman, novelist and Booker Prize nominee, grew up in Luton on the Marsh Farm council estate

== Local refurbishment ==
Whilst many parts of the estate still look like a typical 1960s development, the estate has £32m of European money available for re-development and plans were created by the local council and other interested parties. Councillor Tom Shaw later said that he hoped it would remove the media's memories of Marsh Farm's anti-social past: "The bad reputation – people keep on talking about that [...] That was 25 years ago. People who live on Marsh Farm, love Marsh Farm;" and Mark Peasey the divisional director added: "[the riots were] a long, long time ago [...] We are developing skills for local people and we can leave a legacy behind [with people] continuing to work in the construction industry[.]"

In the summer of 1999, some regeneration money was used to fund murals on the underpasses around the estate. The lead artist, Viv McIntyre, visited schools on the estate and carried out workshops with the pupils, where they provided the images (based on given themes) to create the mural designs. A team of artists then worked with the children to transfer the designs from paper to the walls.

Work was halted until the 2010s, in which tenants were relocated, and old homes were demolished and rebuilt, notably The Purley Centre between 2017 and 2018, which was replaced by houses, a new row of stores, low rise apartments and recreation space. Marsh Farm Library was relocated to Lea Manor High School, which received its own refurbishment between 2009 and 2011. The three tower blocks received sprinkler systems after concerns were raised during the Grenfell Tower fire and blue cladding is being added around the sides.

== Politics ==
Marsh Farm is part of the Northwell ward, which is represented by Cllr Amy Nicholls (Labour), Cllr Rob Roche (Labour) and Cllr Babatunde Ajisola (Labour).

The ward forms part of the parliamentary constituency of Luton North and the MP is Sarah Owen (Labour).

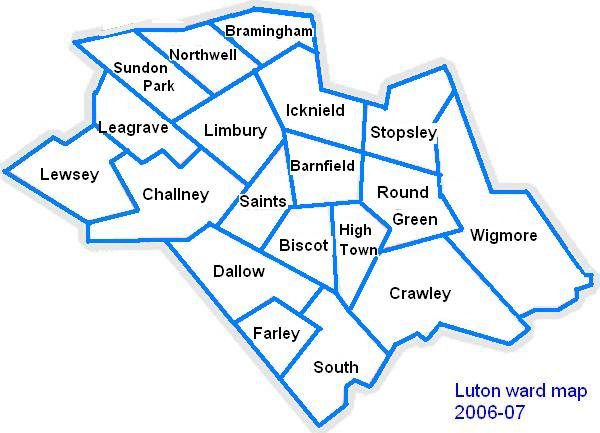
Map of Luton showing Northwell ward

== Local attractions ==
Key
	Abbey/Priory/Cathedral
Accessible open space	Accessible open space
	Amusement/Theme Park
	Castle
Country Park	Country Park
	English Heritage
	Forestry Commission
Heritage railway	Heritage railway
Historic house	Historic House
Places of Worship	Places of Worship
Museum (free) Museum	Museum (free/not free)
National Trust	National Trust
	Theatre
	Zoo

- Dunstable Downs
- Chiltern Hills
- Leagrave Park
- Leighton Buzzard Light Railway
- Luton Museum & Art Gallery
- The Hat Factory
- Luton Hoo
- Mossman Collection
- River Lea
- Someries castle
- Stockwood Craft Museum
- Stockwood Park
- Wardown Park
- Waulud's Bank
- Whipsnade Tree Cathedral
- Whipsnade Wildlife Park
- Woodside Farm and Wildfowl Park
- Wrest Park Gardens
