= Leagrave =

Suburb of Luton, in Bedfordshire, England

Coordinates: 51.903°N 0.466°W

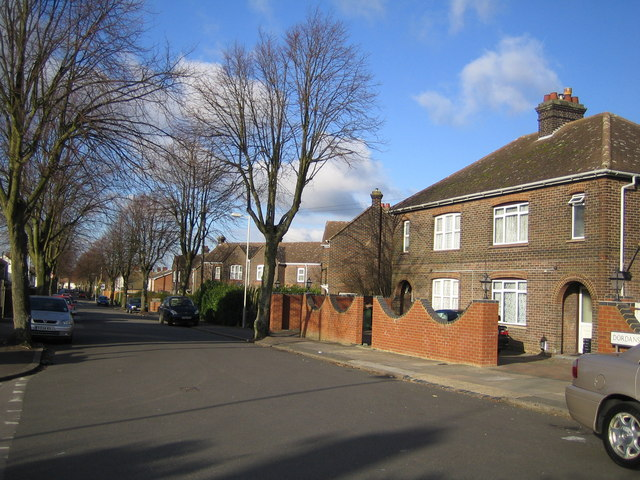
- Dordans Road in Leagrave, showing typical inter-war properties

- Location within Bedfordshire
- Population: 12,910; 11,998 (2011 Census.Ward)
- OS grid reference: TL0523
- Unitary authority: Luton
- Ceremonial county: Bedfordshire
- Region: East
- Country: England
- Sovereign state: United Kingdom
- Post town: LUTON
- Postcode district: LU3, LU4
- Dialling code: 01582
- Police: Bedfordshire
- Fire: Bedfordshire
- Ambulance: East of England
- UK Parliament: Luton North

Leagrave is a former village and now a suburb of Luton, in the ceremonial county of Bedfordshire, England; it lies in the north-west of the town. The current council ward is roughly bounded by Vincent Road, Torquay Drive and High Street to the north, Roman Road and Stoneygate Road to the south, the M1 to the west, and Marsh Road and Leagrave Park to the east.

== Etymology ==
The village of Leagrave was recorded in 1224 as Littegraue, intimating that its name means 'Light-coloured, or lightly wooded, grove'. However, another source suggests its name originates from Lygegrove: "Lyge" being an old name for the River Lea. A place spelt as Lythtegrave (which may refer to Leagrave, since the prior of Dunstaple also features, and the county margination is Bedfordshire) appears in 1396.

== History ==
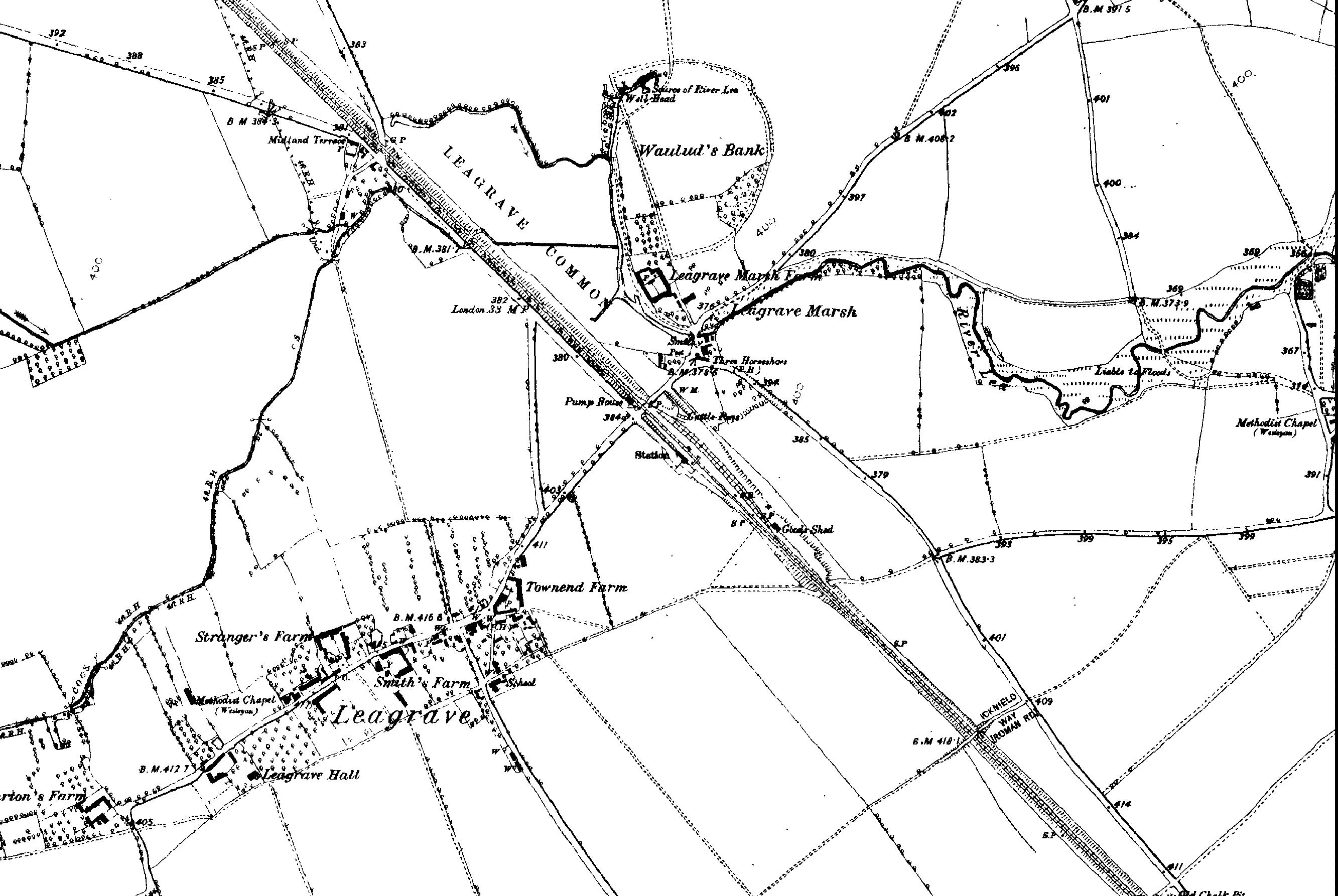
Map showing the extent of Leagrave village in 1889

The first settlement in the area was Waulud's Bank which is a Neolithic D-shaped enclosure in Leagrave Park at the source of the River Lea and is now a protected monument. Waulud's bank consists of a bank and external ditch of around 7 hectares with a turf revetted chalk and gravel bank (built from the excavated ditch material). The ditch itself is about 9 m wide and 2 m deep. Finds at the site have included neolithic Grooved Ware and flint arrow heads. It is a similar site to Durrington Walls and Marden and the site was later re-used in the Iron Age and during the Roman occupation.

The Icknield Way, a pre Roman road, passes through Leagrave. Local road names give away its location, 'Roman Road' runs from Oakley Road to Marsh Road. On the other side of Marsh Road as the road enters Limbury it continues as 'Icknield Road' where there is a gap before the road continues as Icknield Way.

The River Lea which flows through the area once formed one boundary of the Danelaw. Leagrave Marsh used to be a popular place for the Luton hatters on their (rare) days off and was, consequently, known as "Blockers' Seaside". The hatmaking industry originally relied on straw plaits, made by farmers' wives, bought and collected by a "plaitman" and brought into the Luton hat factories to be made into straw hats. A new artwork has been unveiled in the area, reflecting on this former activity.

The manor of Leagrave was held by the Lucy family from 1305 to 1455. The Lucys gave their name to the neighbouring suburbs of Lewsey, Lewsey Farm, and Lewsey Park.

Leagrave station was built by the Midland Railway company in 1868 on its extension to St Pancras. The original Midland station buildings still exist, having been carefully restored in the 1980s.

In 1866, the villages of Leagrave and Limbury were formed into the ecclesiastical parish of 'Holy Trinity, (Biscot)'. Thirty years later, on 1 April 1896 Leagrave civil parish was formed from Luton Rural under the provisions of the 'Local Government Act 1894', in the ecclesiastical parish of Limbury-cum-Biscot.

In 1914, Hewlett & Blondeau Limited, an aircraft manufacturing business, opened a factory at Leagrave called The Omnia Works. The company was managed by Hilda Hewlett who lived on site. During the First World War the factory produced more than 800 aircraft and employed up to 700 people. The business closed in 1920 and in 1926 the factory site was sold to Electrolux.

In 1921, the parish had a population of 1643. The area grew significantly in between the wars and on 1 October 1928 the parish was abolished when the boundaries of Luton were extended to include Leagrave, as well as Limbury and Stopsley. Parts of Leagrave parish went to Houghton Regis and Sundon. Further expansion of the area took place during the 1930s. Much of the housing stock of the area dates from the 1920s and 1930s and is typical of the era, with large bay-fronted semi-detached and terraced houses the typical housing built at this time. Some of the old farm names live on in the modern road names, Strangers Farm lends its name to the current Strangers Way, and Grange Avenue (Grange Road until the 1920s) takes its name from The Grange Farm.

Until the 1990s, Electrolux was one of the larger employers in the area; however, much of the old factory site was sold off in the early 2000s for redevelopment into housing. The most recent development on the site was Saxon-Gate.

The current site of the McDonald's restaurant on Marsh Road was the site of the Three Horseshoes pub, which was demolished in 1994. The roundabout next to McDonald's takes its name from the old pub, with the old pub sign incorporated in the planting scheme. The Sugar Loaf pub was also located on the high street, but this has since been converted into a restaurant and then more recently renovated into flats.

Following Leagrave village becoming part of the larger town of Luton in 1928, many local roads were renamed to avoid confusion with existing Luton road names. For example, Oak Road became Oakley Road, Cumberland Avenue became Compton Avenue and Salisbury Road became Sarum Road (Sarum being the Roman name for Salisbury).

== Local area ==
River Lea as it passes through Leagrave Park

There is a parade of shops on High Street/Grange Avenue at the centre of Leagrave, as well as a busy commercial area on the border with Limbury on Marsh Road.

Electrolux has moved its UK headquarters back to the area, based in one of the old Omnia Works buildings on Oakley Road.

Leagrave is increasingly a commuter area with many people taking advantage of the 35-minute train journey time into London as well as motorway connections to London and to the North. This has led to many new developments of infill housing and apartment buildings.

Much of the land around the old Marsh Farmhouse (which gives its name to neighbouring Marsh Farm), as well as Leagrave Common is now part of Leagrave Park. The park provides contains a number of different areas including sports pitches, native woodland habitat, wildlife areas, river and wetland areas and links to the historic environment. It comprises a playing field of 59.34 acres with pavilion, play area, bowling green and car parking. The park also includes areas of County Wildlife designation, Leagrave Common and the Scheduled Monument, Waulud's Bank a 4500-year-old Neolithic enclosure. Leagrave Park has been legally protected from loss to building development since September 2013 by the charity, Fields in Trust, under the Queen Elizabeth II Fields programme.

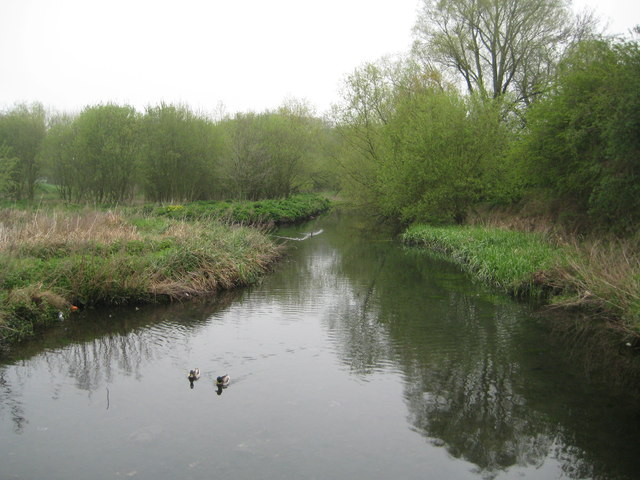
River Lea in Leagrave MarshOnly a few hundred metres from its source and the River Lea is already over 10 metres wide here. The confluence of Houghton Brook with the river is just up the watercourse on the left.

=== Churches ===
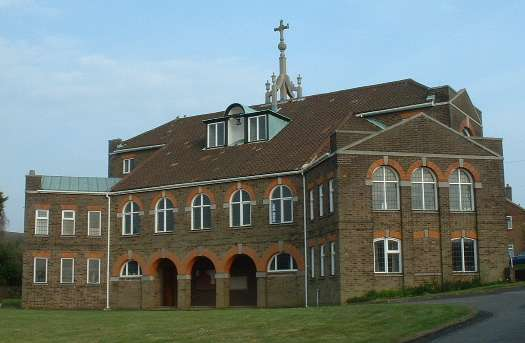
St Luke's Church, Leagrave

The largest church in the parish is St Lukes on Leagrave High Street, which was consecrated by the Bishop of Saint Albans in June 1956. It is a grade II listed building due largely to its frontage, and was designed by John Seely and Paul Paget.

Leagrave Methodist Church is also on Leagrave High Street. The first Methodist Church in Leagrave opened on 3 June 1824 and a gallery was added 5 years later in 1829. This Church was rebuilt in 1880.

=== Education ===
- Beechwood Primary School, Linden Road
- Kings House Preparatory School & Nursery, High Street Leagrave
- Leagrave Library, Marsh Road
- Leagrave Primary School, Strangers Way
- Lealands High School, Sundon Park Road
- Pirton Hill Primary School, Butely Road

Moorlands School and Nursery was founded in 1891. It was originally located in the town centre before moving to Dunstable Road. In 1958, the school had grown significantly and new premises were needed. The school relocated to Leagrave Hall (built in 1850), a former home of the Filmer family. In September 2011, Barnfield Moorlands Free School became a free school, the first such school in Luton and all of Bedfordshire, when it joined the Barnfield Federation in September 2012. The school has since been renamed The Linden Academy and has relocated to Osborne Road in Luton. Today, Leagrave Hall is now the location of a mosque.

== Geography ==
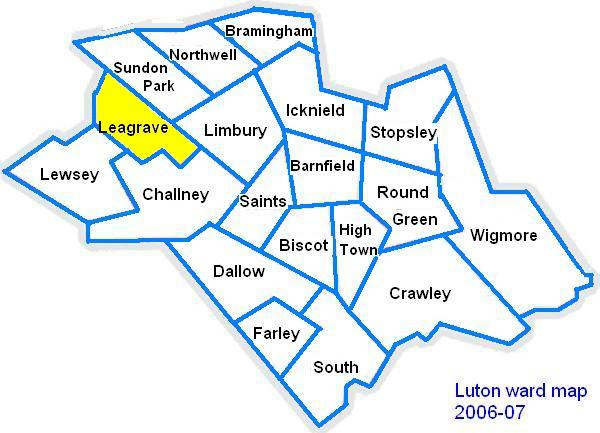
Map of the borough of Luton showing Leagrave's location

Leagrave is in the north-west of Luton, roughly 3.5 miles north of the town centre. Neighbouring areas are Hockwell Ring and Sundon Park to the north, Challney and Maidenhall to the south, Lewsey to the west, and Marsh Farm and Limbury to the east.

The source of the River Lea is in the area, which flows for 42 miles to join the Thames in East London.

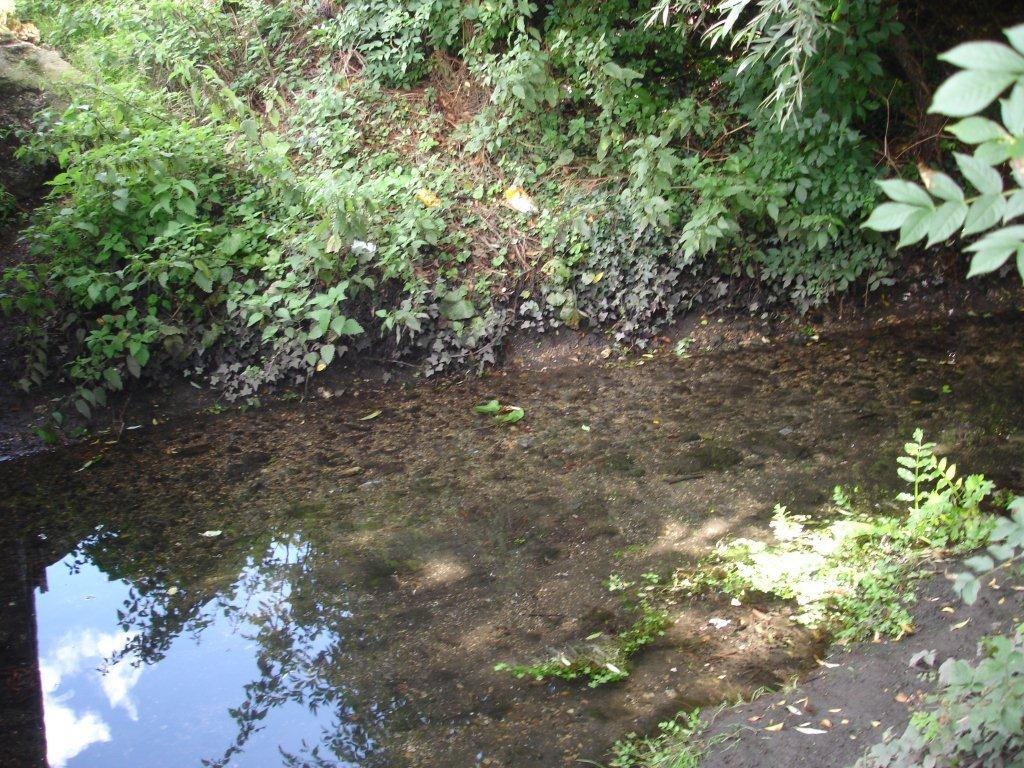
Knapps Brook in Leagrave

The Lea crosses Leagrave Common and receives a number of tributaries including Knapps Brook, which joins from culverts under the railway embankment and Toddington Road, Lewsey Brook and Houghton Brook. Knapps Brook is a combination of brooks from East End, Houghton Regis and from Lewsey Park. Leagrave is a flat area.

== Transport ==
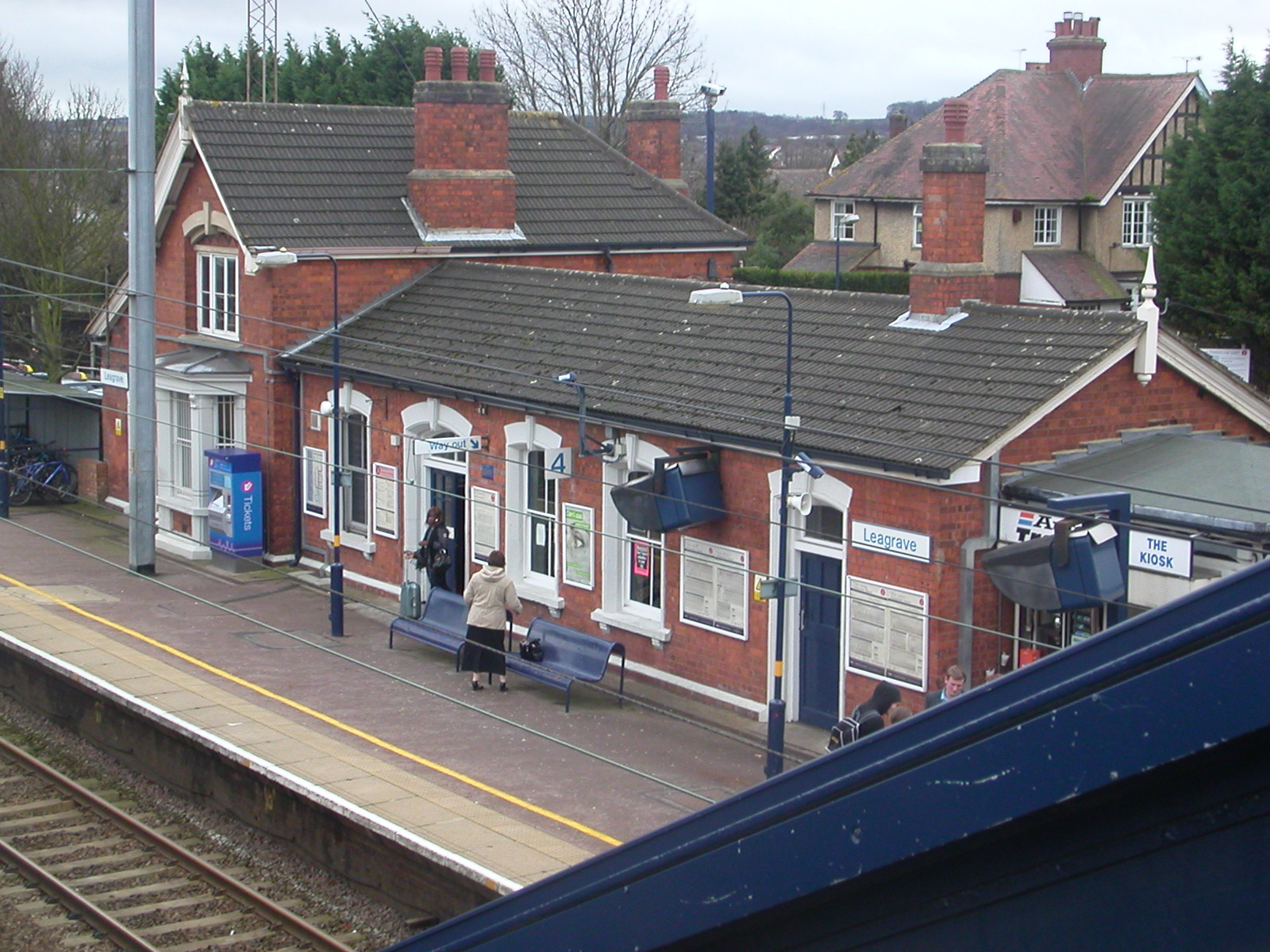
Main station building on platform 4 at Leagrave

Leagrave railway station is a stop on the Midland Main Line. Govia Thameslink Railway operates services on the Thameslink route, with connections to Bedford in the north and London St Pancras and Brighton in the south.

Junctions 11 and 11a of the M1 are close to Leagrave.

Luton Airport is sited nearby.

== Governance ==
The suburb lies mostly within the Leagrave ward, although some parts are within the Limbury and Sundon Park wards. The Leagrave ward also includes Hockwell Ring and Tophill.

Leagrave ward is represented by Cllr Waheed Akbar, Cllr Maria Lovell and Cllr Sameera Saleem (all Labour).

The ward forms part of the parliamentary constituency of Luton North and the MP is Sarah Owen.

== Local attractions ==
Key
	Abbey/Priory/Cathedral
Accessible open space	Accessible open space
	Amusement/Theme Park
	Castle
Country Park	Country Park
	English Heritage
	Forestry Commission
Heritage railway	Heritage railway
Historic house	Historic House
Places of Worship	Places of Worship
Museum (free) Museum	Museum (free/not free)
National Trust	National Trust
	Theatre
	Zoo

- Dunstable Downs
- Chiltern Hills
- Leagrave Park
- Leighton Buzzard Light Railway
- Luton Museum & Art Gallery
- The Hat Factory
- Luton Hoo
- Mossman Collection
- Someries castle
- Stockwood Craft Museum
- Stockwood Park
- Wardown Park
- Waulud's Bank
- Whipsnade Tree Cathedral
- Whipsnade Wildlife Park
- Woodside Farm and Wildfowl Park
- Wrest Park Gardens
- Fancott Miniature Railway

== Media ==
Two weekly newspapers cover the Luton area:

- Herald and Post
- Luton News

== Sport and leisure ==
Leagrave has a non-League football team, Kent Athletic F.C., which plays at Kent Athletic Park.

Since 2005, the Luton Youth Festival has taken place in Leagrave. The festival usually takes place in the grounds and building of St Luke's Church and features a combination of stages, local performances and youth groups. It was described as ' one of the regions most exciting and unique events' by The Luton News. The event is run by charity Leagrave Youth Work Action Group.
