= Paul James Houghton =

Paul James Houghton is a British-born filmmaker who is known for his films From Under the Bridge (2021) and Breaking Plans (2023).

== Early life and education ==
Houghton grew up in Luton, England. He attended Lealands High School in Luton, where he developed an interest in film, theater, and participated in theater productions, including playing the Artful Dodger in "Oliver!". After finishing school, he received a writing scholarship from TCI Cable and studied creative writing and design in college. In 1992, Houghton moved to the United States and eventually settled in California.

== Career ==
Houghton began his career as a screenwriter. In 2006, he sold his first feature-length screenplay, a romantic comedy, to a major studio. Around this period, he wrote and produced a short film titled Skill Crane (2009), which received recognition at local festivals. Before working full-time in film, Houghton was employed as an executive in corporate automotive design in Michigan and California. Selling his first screenplay allowed him to start transitioning away from his corporate career toward filmmaking.

In 2019, Houghton left his executive role and founded Dreamotion Studios in Seal Beach, California, to focus fully on film production. As the studio's founder, he works as a director, writer, and creative producer on independent projects.

Houghton wrote and directed From Under the Bridge: When Bullies Become Trolls, a short drama based on the real-life story of Megan Meier, a 13-year-old who died by suicide in 2006 after experiencing severe online bullying. He originally drafted the script more than a decade before starting production in 2020. The filming, which took place in Seal Beach, California, occurred despite challenges posed by the COVID-19 pandemic. The film premiered in September 2021 at the Dances With Films festival at the TCL Chinese Theatre in Hollywood. Following its debut, it received several festival awards and was later screened internationally. In April 2022, Houghton presented the film at the Bute Street Film Festival in Luton, noting that elements such as school settings and uniforms were inspired by his upbringing there.

In 2023, Houghton co-directed the short film Breaking Plans alongside his daughter, London Houghton. The family-friendly film, written by London, depicts a group of school friends and draws from their family experiences. It premiered on 23 June 2023 at the Dances With Films festival in Hollywood.

Houghton is also producing several new films and projects including Once Upon a Riot, which was filmed in London, Los Angeles and Luton; D-List, starring Luc Clopton (who also appeared in From Under the Bridge); and NENN Country, a non-scripted television show centered around a Southern California veterinarian team. In addition to films, Houghton has directed and produced music videos for Lola Kristine, Koraloo and Si Phili.

== Filmography ==
- Skill Crane (2009)
- From Under the Bridge: When Bullies Become Trolls (2021)
- Breaking Plans (2023)
- Once Upon a Riot (formerly 1992)
- NENN Country (2024)
- The Other Side Lola Kristine (2024)
- Dry Shampoo Koraloo (2025)

== Awards and recognition ==
Houghton's work has been recognized at several film festivals. His short film, From Under the Bridge: When Bullies Become Trolls, received the "Best Short Film" award at the 2021 Dances With Films festival in Los Angeles. The same film earned the Grand Jury Award for Best Short Film at both the Awareness Film Festival in Los Angeles and the London Lift-Off Film Festival. Additionally, Houghton was named Best First-Time Director (Short) at the Los Angeles Film Awards in August 2021. Earlier, his short film Skill Crane (2009) received the Audience Choice Award at the Detroit-area 48 Hour Film Project.

In 2023, Breaking Plans, a short film co-directed with his daughter London, received the Best Student-Made Short Film award at the Boston International Kids Film Festival.
