= Lewsey Farm =

Area of Luton, England

Coordinates: 51.900°N 0.4985°W

- Location within Bedfordshire
- OS grid reference: TL 03401 23524
- Unitary authority: Luton
- Ceremonial county: Bedfordshire
- Region: East
- Country: England
- Sovereign state: United Kingdom
- Post town: LUTON
- Postcode district: LU4
- Dialling code: 01582
- Police: Bedfordshire
- Fire: Bedfordshire and Luton
- Ambulance: East of England
- UK Parliament: Luton North

Lewsey Farm is a suburb of Luton, Bedfordshire, England. Situated in the north-west of the town, the area is roughly bounded by the Woodside Link to the north, Leagrave High Street to the south, Poynters Road to the west, and Pastures Way to the east. The wider area including nearby districts Lewsey Park and Lewsey are sometimes referred to as Lewsey Farm.

== History ==
Lewsey Farm takes its name from the former farm on the site of the modern suburb, 'Lewsey Farm'. Poynters Road, which passes by Lewsey Farm and forms the border between Luton and Dunstable, was named after Poynters Farm which was slightly to the north of Lewsey Farm. Lewsey Farm was situated on land belonging to the Lucy (Lewsey) family (who owned the manor from 1305 to 1455).

Lewsey Farm was built on land north of Lewsey in the 1960s and 1970s. When it was built there was still open land to the east and north of the suburb, until the suburb of Lewsey Park was built to the east a few decades later. A large amount of the houses were social housing, built in the typical style of the time, straight roads of square yellow or grey brick built terraced houses.

== Local area ==
At the centre of Lewsey Farm is St. Dominic’s Square, the local shopping area. This includes a greengrocer, post office, newsagent, supermarket, chemist, a co-op, and a general store selling halal meat.

The area is served by St. Martin de Porres Roman Catholic Church, at the corner of Leagrave High Street and Pastures Way. Lewsey Farm also has a doctors surgery and pharmacy in the north of the area, Wheatfields Surgery. Regis Road recreation ground is in the area, which includes a park and play facilities.

== Schools ==
=== Primary schools ===
- Chantry Primary Academy
- Ferrars Junior School
- St Martin de Porres Primary School
- Southfield Primary School

=== Secondary schools ===
- Chalk Hills Academy

== Politics ==
Lewsey Farm is part of the larger Lewsey ward, which also includes Lewsey and Lewsey Park. The ward is represented by Cllr Jacqui Burnett (Labour), Cllr Aslam Khan (Labour) and Council leader Cllr Hazel Simmons (Labour).

The ward forms part of the parliamentary constituency of Luton North and the MP is Sarah Owen (Labour).

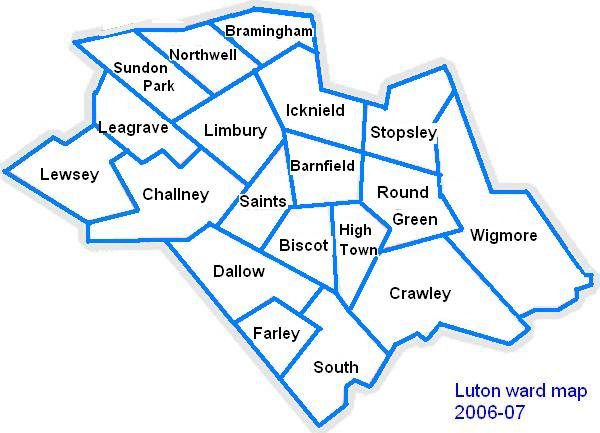
Map of Luton showing Lewsey

== Local attractions ==
Key
	Abbey/Priory/Cathedral
Accessible open space	Accessible open space
	Amusement/Theme Park
	Castle
Country Park	Country Park
	English Heritage
	Forestry Commission
Heritage railway	Heritage railway
Historic house	Historic House
Places of Worship	Places of Worship
Museum (free) Museum	Museum (free/not free)
National Trust	National Trust
	Theatre
	Zoo

- Dunstable Downs
- Chiltern Hills
- Leagrave Park
- Lewsey Park
- Leighton Buzzard Light Railway
- Luton Museum & Art Gallery
- The hat Factory
- Luton Hoo
- Mossman Collection
- Someries castle
- Stockwood Craft Museum
- Stockwood Park
- Wardown Park
- Waulud's Bank
- Whipsnade Tree Cathedral
- Whipsnade Wildlife Park
- Woodside Farm and Wildfowl Park
- Wrest Park Gardens
