= Luton Castle =

- Luton, Bedfordshire, England

Site information
- Type: Castle
- Condition: No visible remains

Location
- Coordinates: 51.87530°N 0.41718°W

Luton Castle was a 12th-century castle in the town of Luton, in the county of Bedfordshire, England (grid reference TL09062082).

== 12th Century Castle ==
A timber motte and bailey castle was built by the mercenary Robert de Waudari at Luton in 1139. It was only in existence until 1154 when it was demolished under the terms of the Treaty of Winchester, signed the previous year by King Stephen and his agreed successor, Henry II of England.

The remains of the castle were finally levelled in the mid-1800s when preparations were being made for the erection of a large house known as Holly Lodge, one-time home of Henry Brown, a prominent local timber merchant.

In 1963 construction works on the Luton News printing works at the corner of Castle and Holly Streets, revealed the remains of a large ditch south-east of Castle Street. It was suggested that this represented part of the bailey ditch of Robert de Waudari's castle.

Some of the palisade post-holes were also exposed for a short time, but unfortunately the castle site had been cleared too well and nothing further of historical interest came to light. Today, Waudari's Castle is just a memory reflected in the street name.

== 13th Century Castle ==
A second castle was built in a different location (close to Vicarage Street) c.1221 by Sir Falkes de Bréauté, an Anglo-Norman soldier who rose to power under John, King of England. The castle is thought to have been demolished in c.1224–5, prior to de Breauté's death c. 1226.
