= St Mary's Hospital, Luton =

St Mary's Hospital
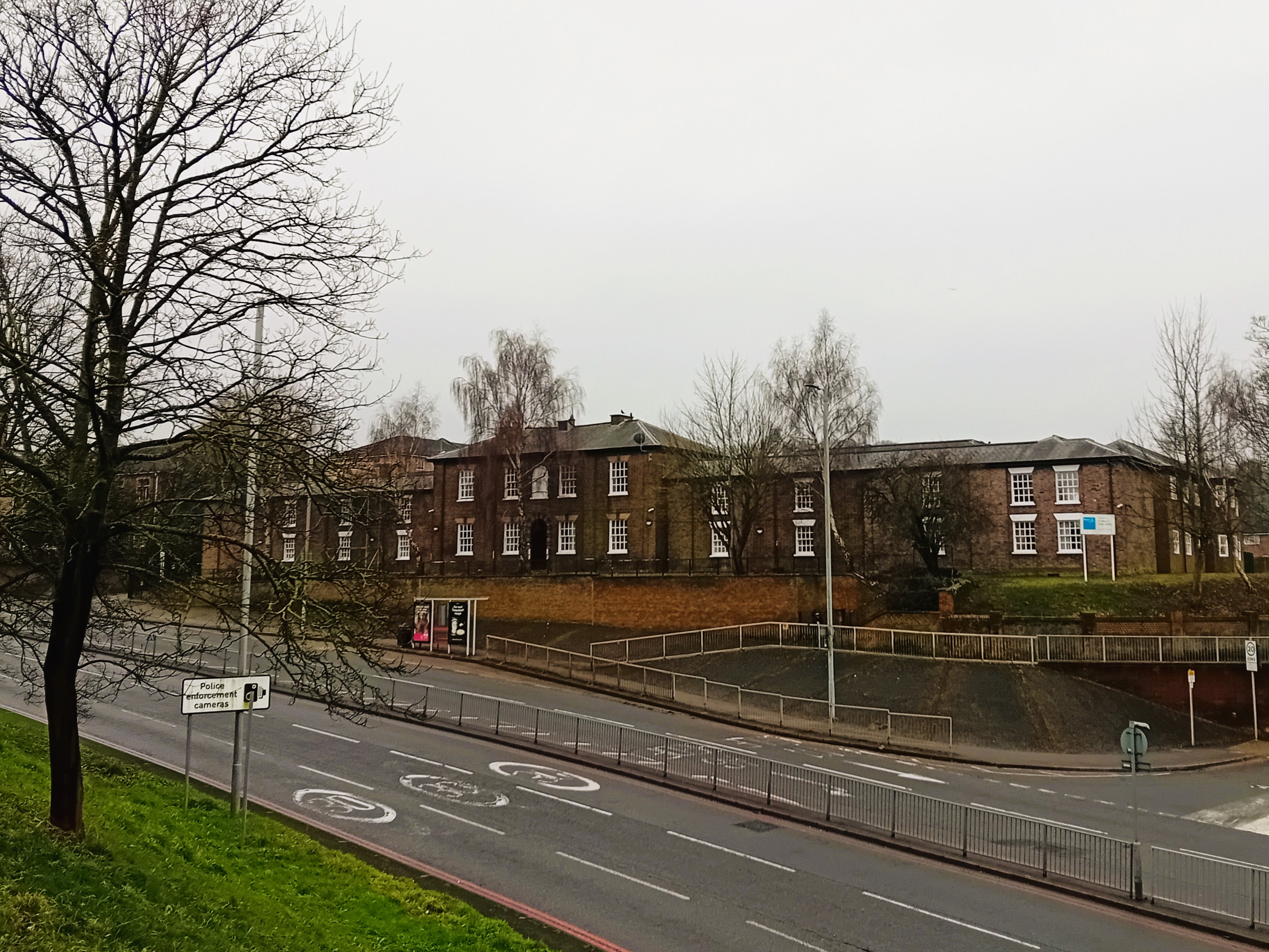
- St Mary's Hospital

- Location within Bedfordshire

Geography
- Location: Dunstable Road, Luton, Bedfordshire, England
- Coordinates: 51.881°N 0.423°W

Organisation
- Type: Care Home for the Elderly

Links
- Lists: Hospitals in England

St Mary's Hospital was created from a workhouse situated on Dunstable Road in Luton, Bedfordshire, England. Several of the original buildings still exist today. Following the introduction of the National Health Service in 1948 the site became St Mary's Hospital and the central block of the main building is now a care home for elderly people. It is a Grade II listed building.

== History ==
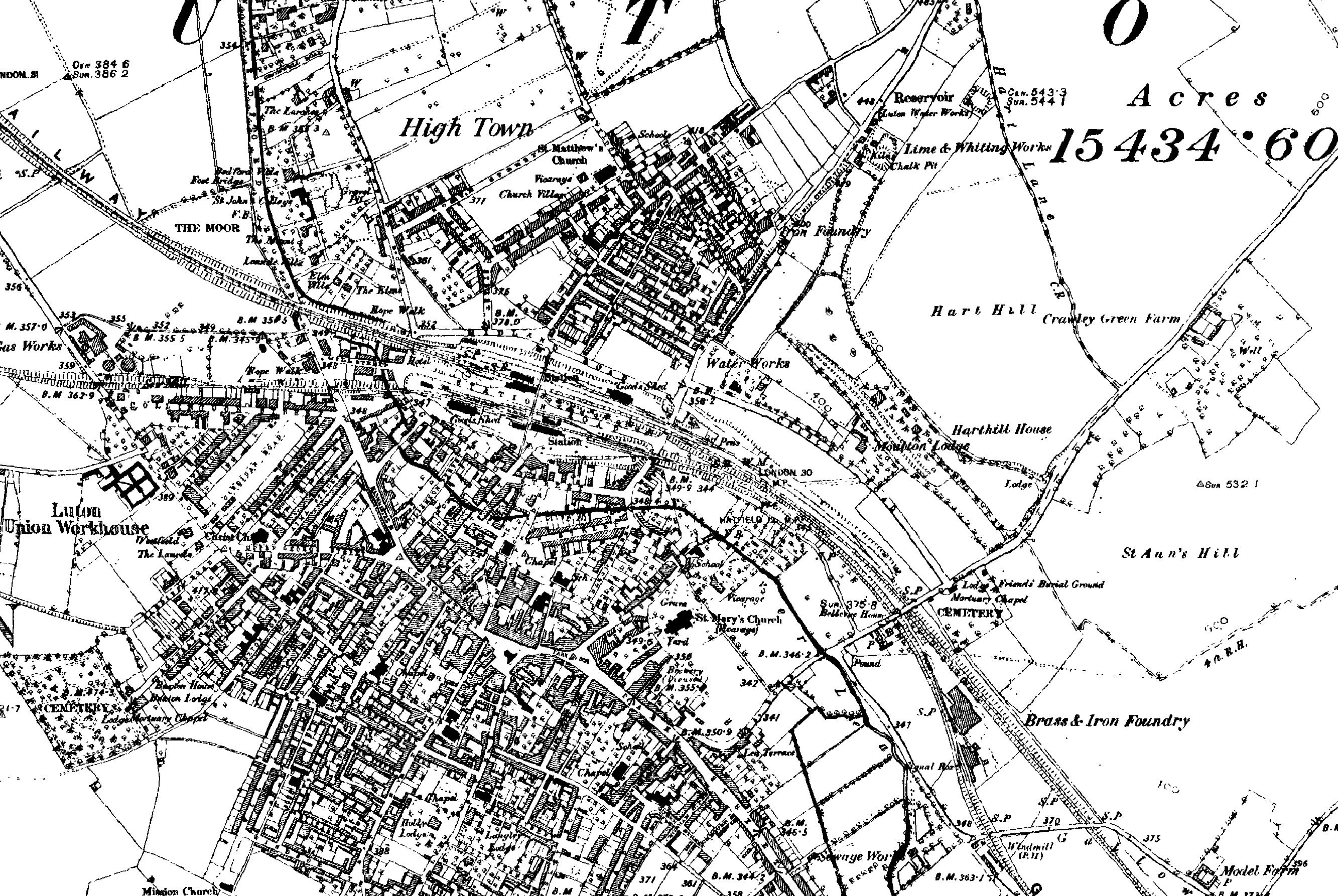
The Union workhouse can be seen on the left hand side of this map dating from 1888

The facility's origins lie in the Luton Union Workhouse which was built on land donated by the Marquis of Bute. (Note: Luton itself had a workhouse from 1722 which was the subject of a report in "An Account of Several Workhouses" dated 17 September 1724.) The central block was designed by John Williams and opened in 1836.

An infirmary block was built to the west of the central block in the 1870s and was replaced by a new infirmary building to the north of the central block in 1912.

After the medical facilities had absorbed the central block itself, the whole site became St Mary's Hospital in 1930 and it joined the National Health Service in 1948.

The main block was subsequently acquired by Bupa, refurbished and then converted into a care home for elderly residents.
