= Hockwell Ring =

Suburb of Luton, England

Coordinates: 51.904°N 0.475°W

- Location within Bedfordshire
- Population: 4,000 (est.)
- OS grid reference: TL0523
- Unitary authority: Luton
- Ceremonial county: Bedfordshire
- Region: East
- Country: England
- Sovereign state: United Kingdom
- Post town: LUTON
- Postcode district: LU4
- Dialling code: 01582
- Police: Bedfordshire
- Fire: Bedfordshire
- Ambulance: East of England
- UK Parliament: Luton North

Hockwell Ring is a suburb of Luton in the north-west of the town, in Bedfordshire, England. The area is roughly bounded by Brickly Road to the north, High Street and Torquay Drive to the south, the M1 motorway to the west, and Vincent Road to the east.

Hockwell Ring mostly consists of a 1950s and 1960s-built council estate. The estate was built as part of the post-war expansion of Luton, at a similar time to Marsh Farm. Hockwell Ring is not a particularly large estate. The area ties into much of the neighbouring 1930s developments and is reasonably well connected to the rest of the town.

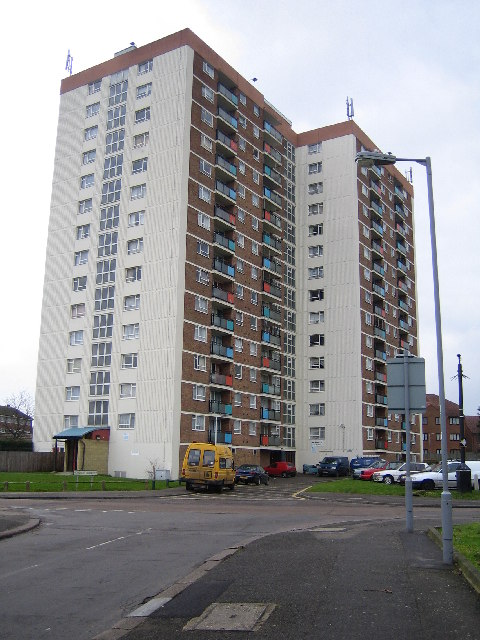
Acworth Court

The estate is dominated by four large towers, which are of similar design, 14 stories high, and top out at 44.20 m each, these can be seen clearly from the M1 motorway southbound carriageway just before Junction 11, which passes close to the estate.

The tower blocks were constructed in 1965–1966, at roughly the same time as the rest of the estate and are typical examples of the British approach to 1960s high-rise living. They dominate the skyline of that part of the town, and along with the towers in Marsh Farm and Park Town are the tallest buildings in the town and county. At the centre of the estate is a small shopping centre, park, and other facilities, doctors and dentist. The tower blocks are undergoing some refurbishment to the exterior.

Like many other estates of the 1960s, Hockwell Ring was seen as a vision for the future; however, by the 1990s the reality was very different. House prices in the area had fallen dramatically and the estate had developed a very real image problem. Things have begun to change in recent times. An influx of London commuters to the area due to its proximity to Leagrave train station has led to an increase in house prices. The estate is seeing some improvements. Many of the locals that caused problems and damaged the image of the area have now moved out, and the area as a whole has a much safer image.

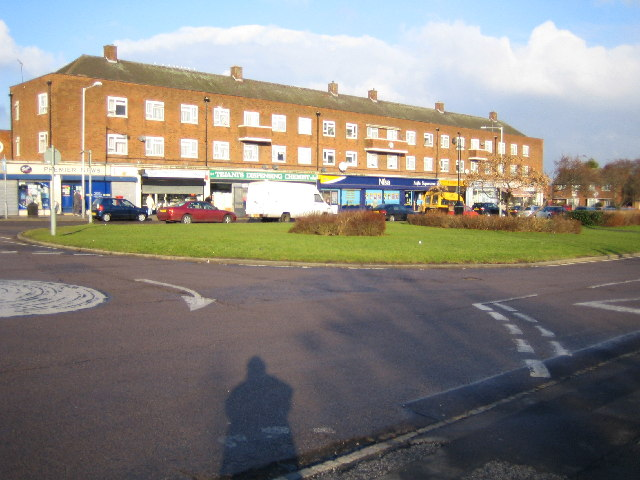
Hockwell Ring shops viewed looking north from the south side of The Green

== Local schools and education ==
Nurseries

- Gill Blowers Nursery, Mossdale Court

Primary schools

- Beechwood Primary School, Linden Road
- Leagrave Primary School, Strangers Way
- Pirton Hill Primary School, Butely Road
- King’s House Moorlands School, Leagrave High Street

Secondary schools

- Chalk Hills Academy, Emerald Road
- Lealands High School, Sundon Park Road

Libraries

- Leagrave Library, Marsh Road

== Politics ==
Hockwell Ring is within Leagrave ward, which is represented by Cllr Waheed Akbar (Labour), Cllr Maria Lovell (Labour) and Cllr Sameera Saleem (Labour).

The ward forms part of the parliamentary constituency of Luton North, and the MP is Sarah Owen (Labour).

== Local attractions ==
Key
	Abbey/Priory/Cathedral
Accessible open space	Accessible open space
	Amusement/Theme Park
	Castle
Country Park	Country Park
	English Heritage
	Forestry Commission
Heritage railway	Heritage railway
Historic house	Historic House
Places of Worship	Places of Worship
Museum (free) Museum	Museum (free/not free)
National Trust	National Trust
	Theatre
	Zoo

- Chiltern Hills
- Dunstable Downs
- The Hat Factory
- Houghton Hall Park
- Leagrave Park
- Leighton Buzzard Light Railway
- Luton Hoo
- Luton Museum & Art Gallery
- Mossman Collection
- Someries Castle
- Stockwood Craft Museum
- Stockwood Park
- Wardown Park
- Waulud's Bank
- Whipsnade Tree Cathedral
- Whipsnade Zoo
- Woodside Farm and Wildfowl Park
- Wrest Park Gardens

== Local newspapers ==
Two weekly newspapers cover Hockwell Ring, although they are not specific to the area.

They are the:

- Herald and Post
- Luton News
