= Lewsey =

Area of Luton, England

Coordinates: 51.895°N 0.479°W

- Location within Bedfordshire
- Population: Within Lewsey ward
- OS grid reference: TL 04706 22953
- Unitary authority: Luton
- Ceremonial county: Bedfordshire
- Region: East
- Country: England
- Sovereign state: United Kingdom
- Post town: LUTON
- Postcode district: LU4
- Dialling code: 01582
- Police: Bedfordshire
- Fire: Bedfordshire
- Ambulance: East of England
- UK Parliament: Luton North

Lewsey is a suburb of Luton, about 3 miles (4.8 km) west north-west of the town centre, and a ward of the Borough of Luton, in the ceremonial county of Bedfordshire, England. The suburb is roughly bounded by Leagrave High Street to the north, Dunstable Road to the south, Poynters Road, Dunstable to the west, and the M1 to the east.

== History ==
Lewsey derives its name from the Lucy family, who owned the land Lewsey is built on, as well as neighbouring Lewsey Farm and Lewsey Park. The Lucy family owned the manor from 1305 to 1455. The manor then passed to the Wingate family who were the lords of the manor of Toddington. The old manor house stood partly in the parish of Luton and partly in the parish of Houghton Regis; most of the manor buildings were destroyed by fire in 1832.

Lewsey is much older than both Lewsey Farm and Lewsey Park, first built on land off Dunstable Road in the 1950s along with the hospital. At this time it was a fairly rural suburb, surrounded by farmland on all sides, including the original Lewsey Farmhouse to the north. The estate is characteristic of its time, consisting of a mixture of square, large windowed houses and a large number of bungalows of a similar style, many of the bungalows with a bay window at the front.

== Local area ==
Near the centre of Lewsey is the Luton and Dunstable University Hospital, which serves Luton and the rest of its urban area, including Dunstable and Houghton Regis.

Lewsey is served by two churches; St. Hugh's C. of E. Church on Leagrave High Street and a chapel of the Church of Jesus Christ of Latter-day Saints on Poynters Road. Lewsey also has a post office on Dunstable Road.

== Schools ==
- Ferrars Junior School
- Ferrars Nursery
- The Ferrars Academy
- The Chalk Hills Academy
- Seabrook Day Nursery

== Politics ==
Lewsey is part of the larger Lewsey ward, which also includes Lewsey Farm and Lewsey Park. The ward is represented by Cllr Jacqui Burnett (Labour), Cllr Aslam Khan (Labour) and Council leader Cllr Hazel Simmons (Labour). The ward forms part of the parliamentary constituency of Luton North and the MP is Sarah Owen (Labour).

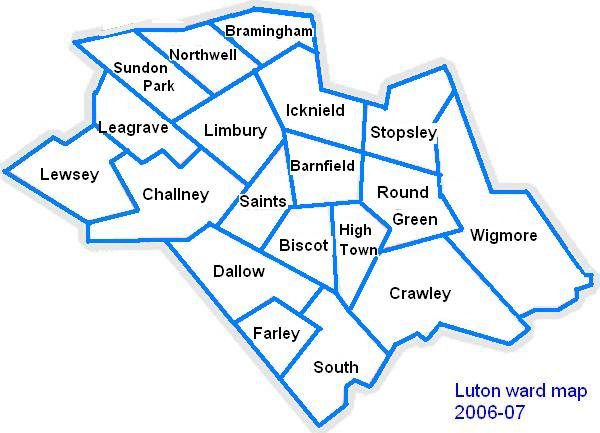
Map of Luton showing Lewsey

== Local attractions ==
Key
| | Abbey/Priory/Cathedral |
| Accessible open space | Accessible open space |
| | Amusement/Theme Park |
| | Castle |
| Country Park | Country Park |
| | English Heritage |
| | Forestry Commission |
| Heritage railway | Heritage railway |
| Historic house | Historic House |
| Places of Worship | Places of Worship |
| Museum (free) Museum | Museum (free/not free) |
| National Trust | National Trust |
| | Theatre |
| | Zoo |

- Dunstable Downs
- Chiltern Hills
- Leagrave Park
- Leighton Buzzard Light Railway
- Wardown Park Museum
- The Hat Factory
- Luton Hoo
- Mossman Collection
- Someries castle
- Stockwood Craft Museum
- Stockwood Park
- Wardown Park
- Waulud's Bank
- Whipsnade Tree Cathedral
- Whipsnade Wildlife Park
- Woodside Farm and Wildfowl Park
- Wrest Park Gardens

== Local newspapers ==
Two weekly newspapers cover Lewsey, although they are not specific to the area.

They are the:

- Herald and Post
- Luton News
