= William Vallans =

- Born: Ware, Hertfordshire
- Occupation: Poet
- Years active: 1578–1590

William Vallans (fl. 1578–1590) was an English poet.

== Early life ==
Vallans was the son of John Vallans, was born near Ware, Hertfordshire, and afterwards carried on business as a salter. He was a friend of Camden and other antiquaries, and himself took an interest in antiquarian matters.

== Career ==
In 1590 Vallans published a poem in unrhymed hexameters entitled A Tale of Two Swannes, printed by Roger Ward for John Sheldrake (London). In the poem he announced his intention of leaving England, and likened his farewell verses to the swan's dying song. The poem is devoted to a description of the situation and antiquities of several towns in Hertfordshire, and mention is made of many seats in the county belonging to the queen and nobility. Vallans probably carried out his intention of leaving England soon after.

His poem is one of the earliest examples of the employment of blank verse in English literature outside drama, and he was perhaps induced to attempt this form of metre by his admiration for Abraham Fraunce, from whose translation of Thomas Watson's Latin Odes he quotes. His book is rare: it was reprinted by Thomas Hearne (1678–1735) in 1711 in the fifth volume of his edition of Leland's Itinerary from a copy in the possession of Thomas Rawlinson (1681–1725) Another poem by "William Vallans, salter", is preserved in the Harleian manuscripts (No. 367, f. 129). It complains of the injustice of suffering John Stowe to go unrewarded after compiling his Survey of London.

Vallans had some commendatory verses prefixed to Whartons Dreame, published in 1578; and Hearne assigned to him the authorship of The Honourable Prentice; or thys Tayler is a Man; shewed in the Life and Death of Sir John Hawkewood, by W. V., London, 1615 and 1616.
