= River Lea =

River in the south east of England

Lea Lee
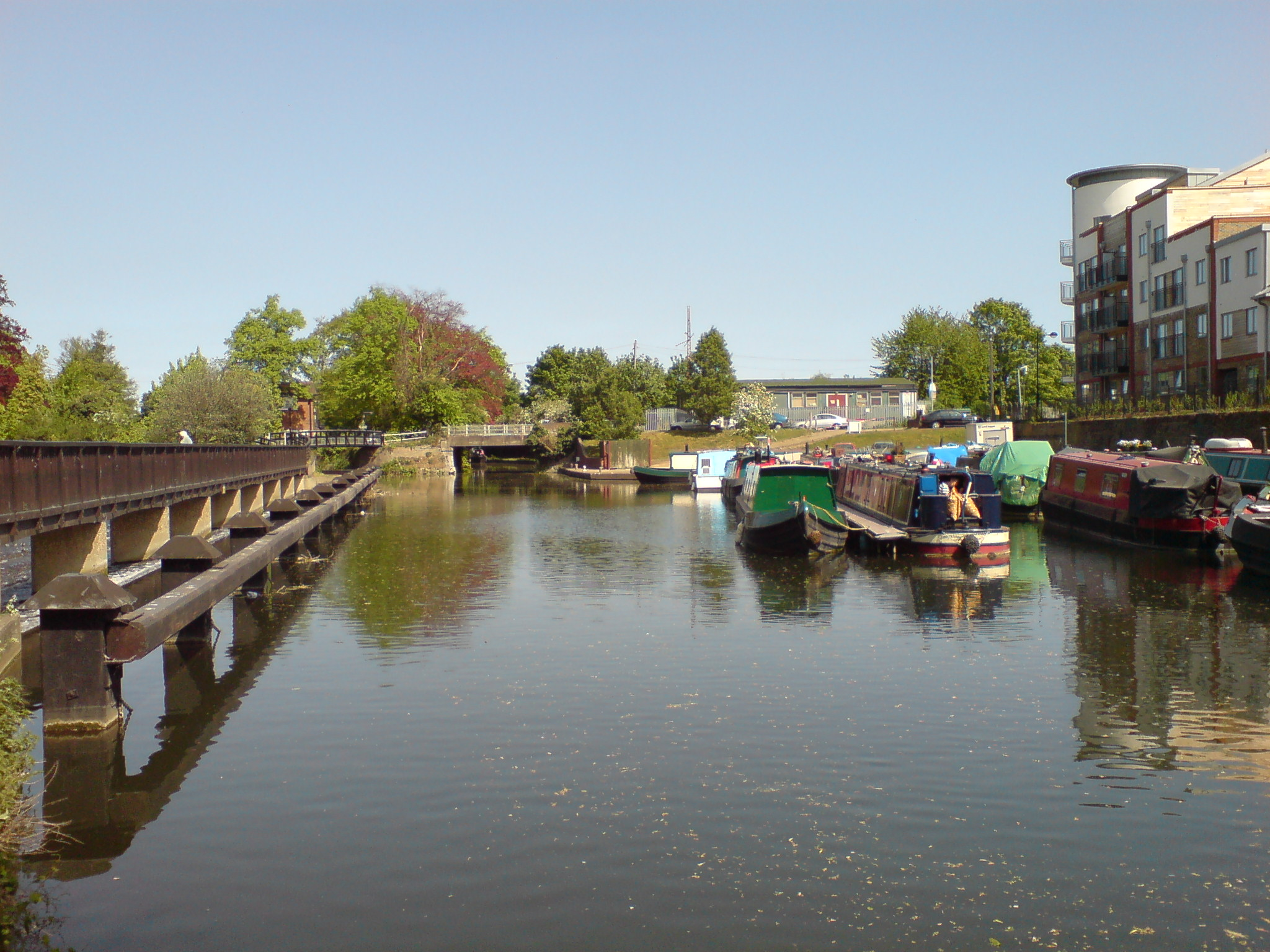
- River Lea at Hertford Basin

Location
- Country: United Kingdom
- Counties: Bedfordshire, Hertfordshire, Essex, Greater London
- Towns: Leagrave, Luton, Harpenden, Hatfield, Hertford, Ware, Hoddesdon, Broxbourne, Waltham Abbey, Enfield Town, Edmonton, Tottenham, Clapton, Walthamstow, Stratford, Bow, Canning Town

Physical characteristics
- Source
  - location: Leagrave, Luton
  - coordinates: 51.910338°N 0.461233°W
  - elevation: 115 m (377 ft)
- Mouth
  - location: Bow Creek, River Thames
  - coordinates: 51.5072°N 0.0092°E
  - elevation: 0 m (0 ft)
- Length: 68 km (42 mi)
- Discharge
  - location: Luton Hoo, Luton
  - average: 1.8 m^{3}/s (64 cu ft/s)
- Discharge
  - location: Feildes Weir, Hoddesdon
  - average: 4.3 m^{3}/s (150 cu ft/s)

Basin features
- Designation

Ramsar Wetland
- Official name: Lea Valley
- Designated: 9 October 2000
- Reference no.: 1037

The River Lea (/ˈliː/ LEE) is a river in the East of England and Greater London. It originates in Bedfordshire, in the Chiltern Hills, and flows southeast through Hertfordshire, along the Essex border and into Greater London, to meet the River Thames at Bow Creek. It is one of the largest rivers in London and the easternmost major tributary of the Thames.

The river's significance as a major east–west barrier and boundary has tended to obscure its importance as a north–south trade route. Below Hertford the river has since medieval times had alterations made to make it more navigable for boats between the Thames and eastern Hertfordshire and Essex, known as the Lee Navigation. This stimulated much industry along its banks. The navigable River Stort, the main tributary, joins it at Hoddesdon.

While the lower Lea remains somewhat polluted, its upper stretch and tributaries, classified as chalk streams, are a major source of drinking water for London. An artificial waterway known as the New River, opened in 1613, abstracts clean water away from the upper stretch of the river near Hertford for drinking. The Lea's origin in the Chilterns contributes to the extreme hardness (high mineral content) of London tap water.

== Name ==
=== Etymology ===
The name of the River Lea was first recorded in the 9th century, although is believed to be much older. Spellings from the Anglo-Saxon period include Lig(e)an in 880 and Lygan in 895, and in the early medieval period it is usually Luye or Leye. It seems to be derived from a Celtic (brythonic) root lug-meaning 'bright or light' which is also the derivation of a name for a deity, so the meaning may be 'bright river' or 'river dedicated to the god Lugus'. A simpler derivation may well be the Brythonic word cognate with the modern Welsh "Li" pronounced "Lea" which means a flow or a current.

Much of the middle Lea was historically known as 'Mereditch', the first element deriving from the Old English 'gemaera', meaning boundary. This was due to that section of the river's role as the dividing line between territories, for instance separating Middlesex and Essex. By the 20th century 'Mereditch' had evolved to 'Mare Dyke' and referred to just one channel of the river between Chingford and Enfield. The channel was replaced by parts of the Lee Valley Reservoir Chain in the mid 20th century.

The River Lea is the major component in a number of place-names, including Leagrave, the suburb of Luton where the source of the river is located, and of Luton and Leyton: both mean "farmstead on the River Lea".

=== Spelling ===
The spelling Lea predominates west (upstream) of Hertford, but both spellings (Lea and Lee) are used from Hertford to the River Thames. The Lee Navigation was established by Acts of Parliament and only that spelling is used in this context. The Lee Valley Regional Park Authority also uses this spelling for leisure facilities. However, the spelling Lea is used for road names, locations and other infrastructure in the capital, such as Leamouth, Lea Bridge, the Lea Valley Walk and the Lea Valley lines (railway). This spelling is also used in geology, archaeology, etc. to refer to the Lea Valley.

=== Other uses ===
The term River Lea is Cockney rhyming slang for tea.

== Natural boundary ==
Course of the River Lea

The line of the Lea, and its major tributary, the Stort, has long been used as a political boundary. In the Iron Age the Lea and Stort valleys formed a hotly contested frontier zone between the Catuvellauni to the west and the eastern Trinovantes. The two rivers are assumed to have been the boundary between the core territory of the Kingdom of the East Saxons and its Middle Saxon Province. The whole of the Lea was subsequently used as the boundary between English-ruled territory to the west and the Danelaw, established in the late 9th century, to the east.

From around the ninth or tenth century, and the establishment of counties in this part of England, the Lea-Stort line has formed the historic boundary between Essex to the east and Hertfordshire and Middlesex to the west. Within London the river is always used as a boundary between London Boroughs - which in turn inherit more ancient county and parish boundaries which also used the Lea as a boundary. Between 1889 and 1965, the lower Lea was the eastern boundary of the County of London with Essex.

When reviewing the boundaries of London's parliamentary constituencies, the Boundary Commission treats the Thames and Lea as London's major internal barriers. It will not allow a new or altered constituency that spans either river, viewing such a construct as artificial and not reflective of local communities or identities. They have compromised on this further south, on the lower Lea, where the quality and quantity of cross-river links is much greater, and the communities on either side better integrated as a result.

== Course ==
=== Upper Lea ===
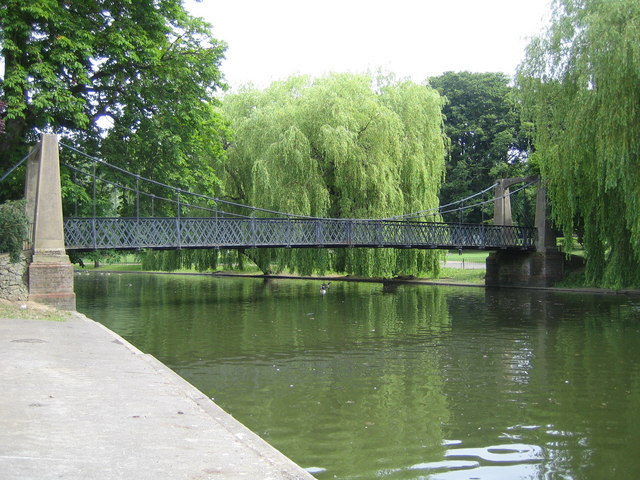
A pedestrian suspension bridge spans the boating lake created where the widened river flows through Wardown Park in Luton.

The source of the Lea is usually said to be at Well Head inside Waulud's Bank, a Neolithic henge at Leagrave Common in Luton, Bedfordshire, although just downstream the river is joined by Houghton Brook, a stream that starts 2 miles (3 km) further west in Houghton Regis.

After passing through Luton, the young river passes through the Luton Hoo estate and, six miles from its source, enters Hertfordshire. The river then flows east-south-east through Harpenden, Wheathampstead – once capital of the Catuvellauni tribe – through the narrow green gap between the new towns of Hatfield and Welwyn Garden City, and on to the county town of Hertford.

=== Middle Lea ===
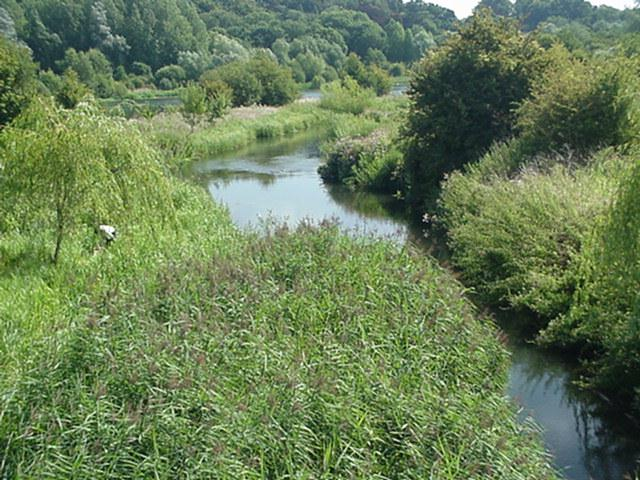
The River Lea at Great Amwell, home of the Amwell Magna Fishery, was fished by Izaak Walton – author of The Compleat Angler

At Hertford the shallow river turns briefly north before turning to head due south, and here the river and its surrounding areas change significantly. Around Hertford, the Lea is joined by a number of major tributaries: the Mimram, Beane, Rib, Ash, and then the Stort.

This extra volume of water has created a broad flood plain with sometimes steep hills on either side. The river passes through this valley in several channels, which are a result of both human intervention and natural causes. The increased flow made the river navigable from Hertford, a situation improved by the creation of the Lee Navigation, a deep canal which begins at Hertford Castle Weir.

The Stort, the most important tributary of the Lea, joins a short distance from Hertford at Feildes Weir, and is itself navigable as far upstream as Bishops Stortford. The Hertford East railway line passes along the west side of the Lea's flood plain, from Hertford to Tottenham, improving the accessibility of the area and contributing to the ribbon development that made the character of the west side of the valley much more developed than the east.

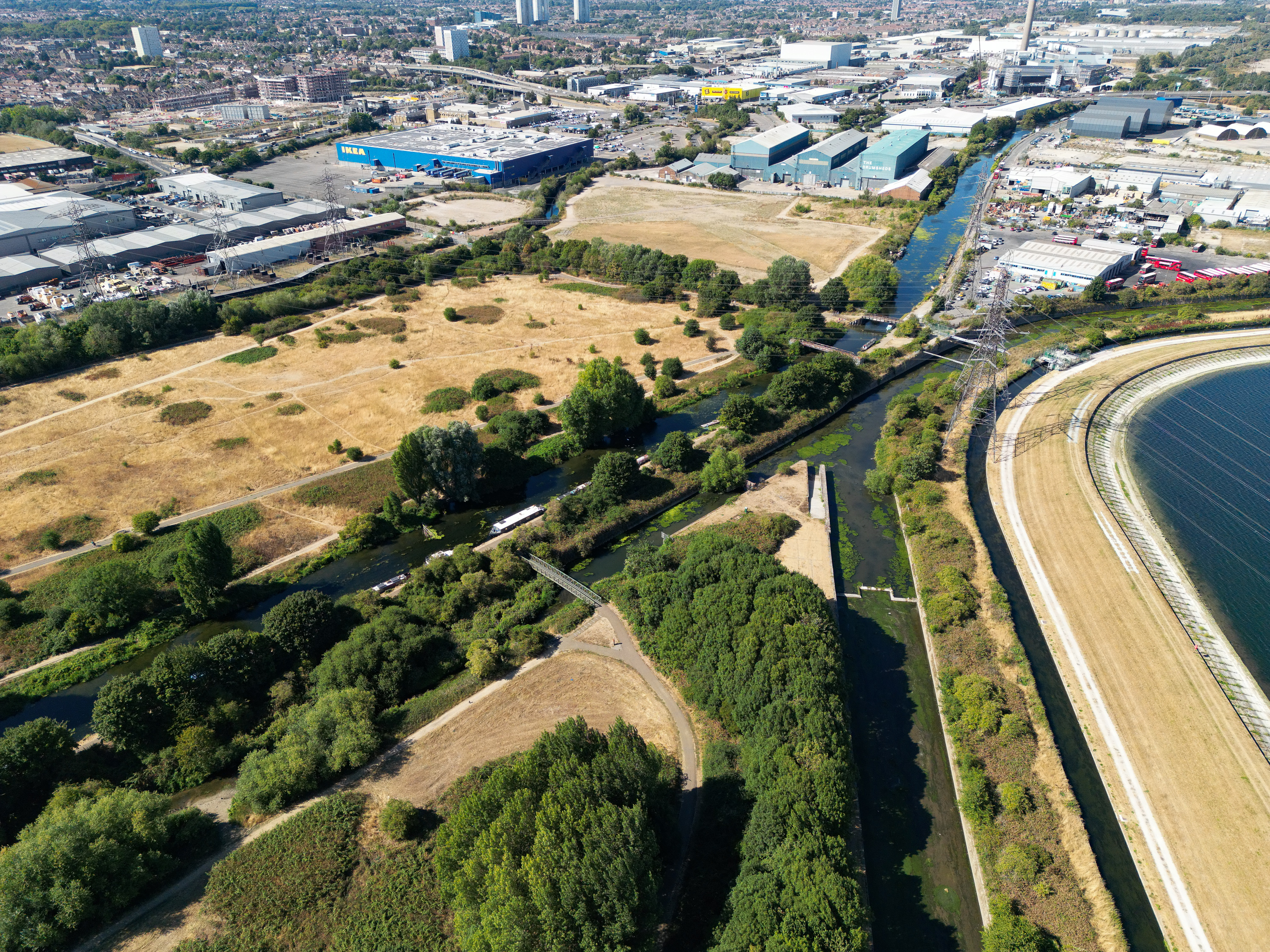
River Lea, Diversion, and Flood Relief channels at Tottenham

Just after Hertford, the river passes the medieval river port of Ware and the Hertfordshire bank soon becomes entirely developed. On the west bank the river passes Hoddesdon, Broxbourne and Cheshunt in Hertfordshire; then Enfield, Edmonton, Tottenham and Tottenham Marshes in north London. On the eastern side the river passes Waltham Abbey on the largely rural Essex bank, and then Chingford and Walthamstow in east London.

South of Hertford, the river is lined by lakes; to the north these are primarily flooded former gravel pits but in London they are reservoirs: the 13 reservoirs of the Lee Valley Reservoir Chain, fed by the branches of the river known as the River Lee Flood Relief Channel and the River Lee Diversion. These reservoirs come to an end on the boundaries of the London Boroughs of Haringey and Hackney and form part of a broad undeveloped green space, a mile (800 m) wide in places, which extends deep into London.

=== Lower Lea ===
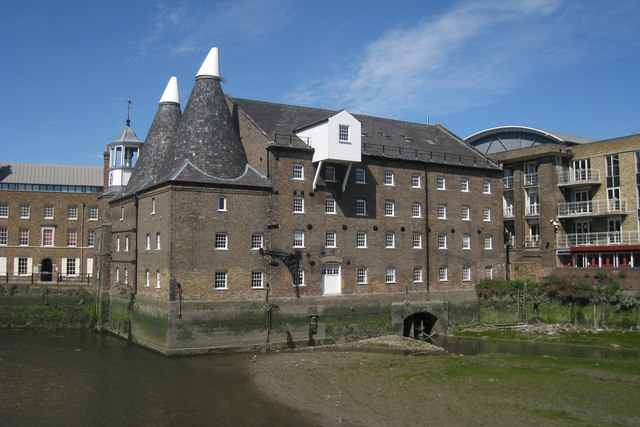
The Clock Mill at Three Mills

On Hackney's northern edge, the Lea shifts to a south-south-easterly direction, the reservoirs end, but the broad green corridor continues as the river passes through Walthamstow Marshes, Leyton Marshes, Hackney Marshes and the Queen Elizabeth Olympic Park. In that park, and just to the south of it, the river's course splits, running almost entirely in man-made channels, the Bow Back Rivers. These channels were once much more numerous and originally created to power water mills including, at the southern end, the restored tidal mill called Three Mills. The area around the Bow Back Rivers subsequently became a thriving industrial zone. Around Bow Creek, major industry prevailed, including the Thames Ironworks, Bromley-by-Bow Gasworks and West Ham Power Station. In the 1960s and 1970s, changing economic conditions led to a steep decline and deindustrialisation along this section of the Lea.

The river was historically tidal as far north as Hackney Wick, but now the tide is held back by the Bow Locks between Bromley-by-Bow and West Ham. Although watercraft can follow the Lea down to the Thames, it is generally more practical to follow the Limehouse Cut (which meets the Lea at Bow Locks) down to Limehouse Basin, and use the Limehouse Basin Lock to join the Thames.

The communities on the west side of the lower Lea include Hackney, Bow and Bromley-by-Bow. On the east side, they include southern parts of Walthamstow, then Leyton, Stratford and West Ham. The last few miles of the river are known as Bow Creek and the river meets the Thames between Blackwall (on the west side) and Canning Town (on the east).

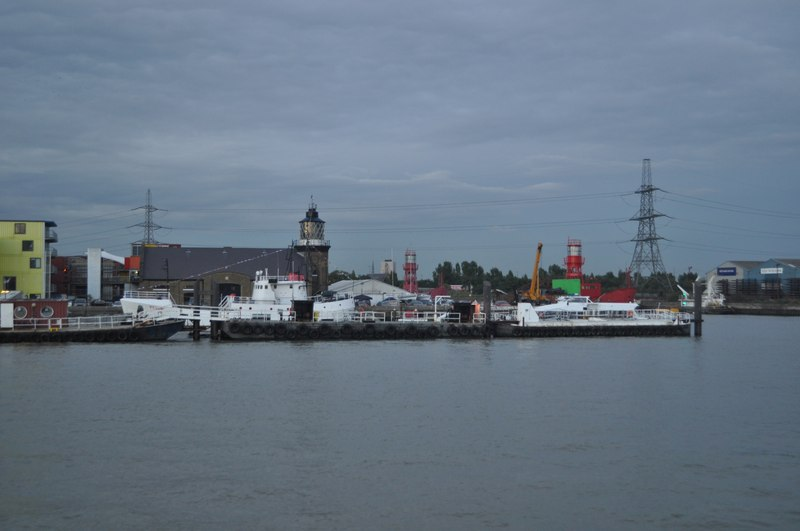
Lighthouse at Trinity Buoy Wharf, Blackwall; at the confluence of the Lea and Thames

== River history ==
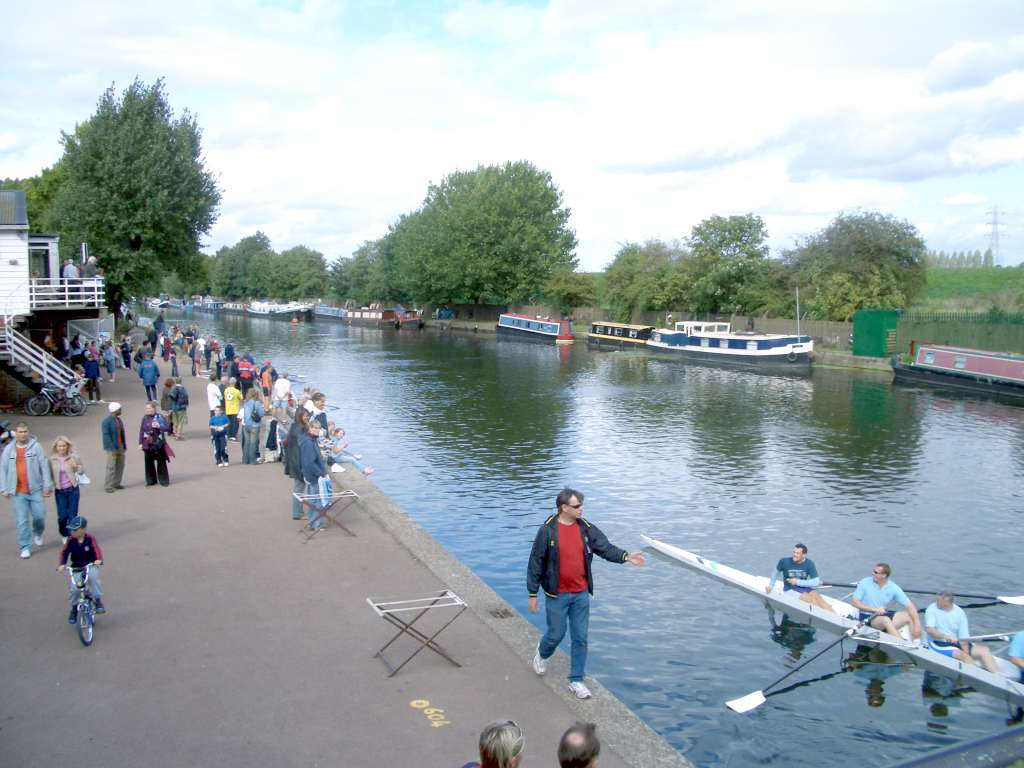
Rowing boat on the River Lea

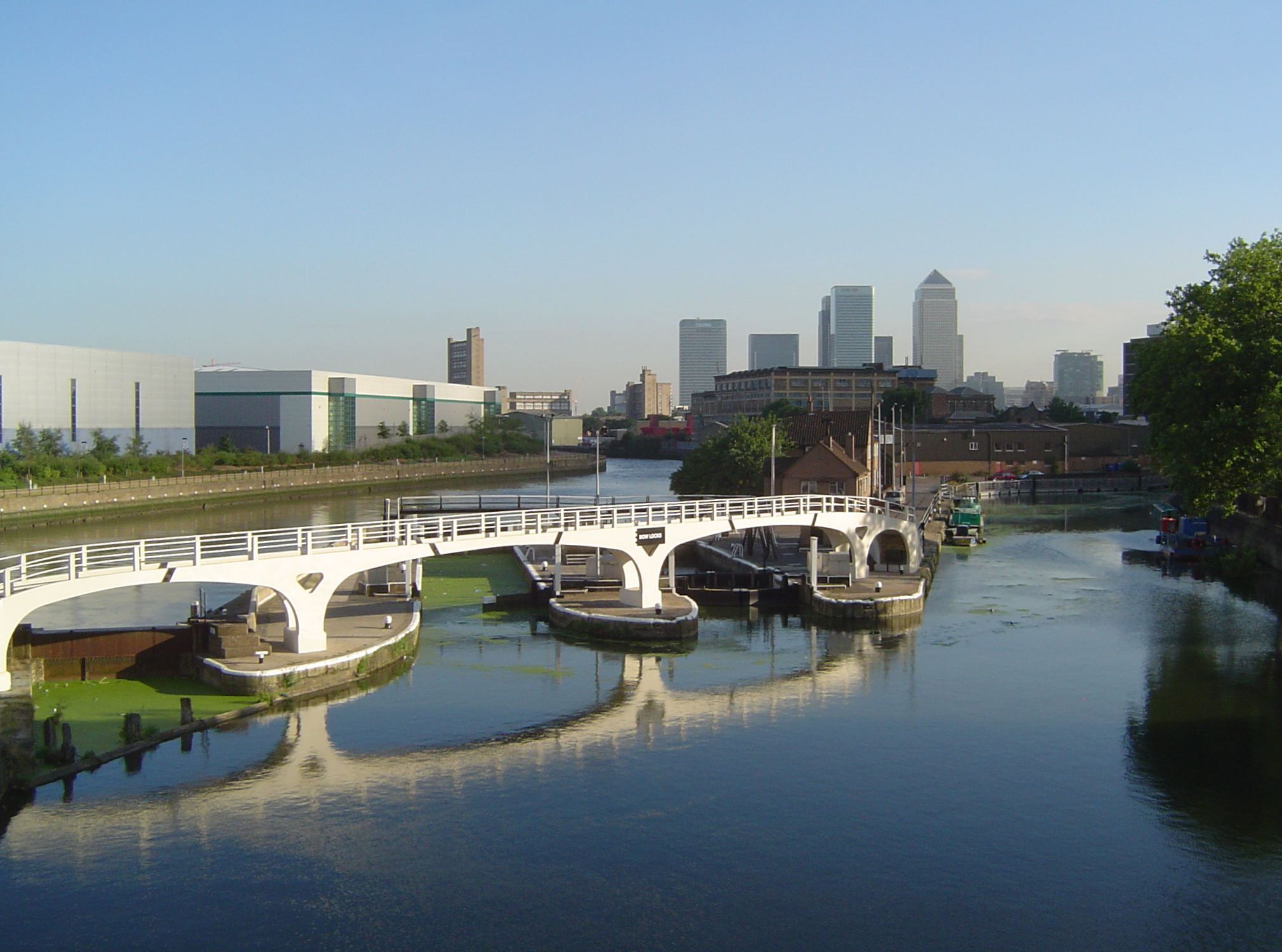
Bow Creek (tidal) meets the Limehouse Cut (canal) with a view of London's Docklands

=== Crossings ===
In the Roman era, Old Ford, as the name suggests, was the most downstream crossing point of the River Lea. This was part of a pre-Roman route that followed the modern Oxford Street, Old Street, through Bethnal Green to Old Ford and then across a causeway through the marshes known as Wanstead Slip (now in Leyton). The route then continued through Essex to Colchester. At this time, the Lea was a wider river, and the tidal estuary stretched as far as Hackney Wick. Evidence has been found of a late Roman settlement at Old Ford, dating from the 4th and 5th centuries.

In 1110, Matilda, wife of Henry I, reputedly took a tumble at the ford, on her way to Barking Abbey and ordered a distinctively bow-shaped, three-arched, bridge to be built over the River Lea (The like of which had not been seen before), at Bow, the first bridge over the lower Lea. The lower Lea was at that time a wide, tidal and unchannelled river, so the construction of the bridge allowed a far greater degree of social and economic integration between Essex on one side and Middlesex (including the City of London) on the other than had been possible before.

Lea Bridge, the second bridge over the lower Lea was built after 1757, to replace the pre-existing ferry. It connected Clapton to the west, and Leyton and Walthamstow to the east. The Iron Bridge carrying the Barking Road over the river to Canning Town was built in 1810. There are significantly more crossings over the more central Lower Lea, than there are over the Middle Lea.

=== Trade and industry ===
During the Middle Ages, Temple Mills, Abbey Mills, Old Ford and Bow were the sites of water mills (mainly in ecclesiastic ownership) that supplied flour to the bakers of Stratforde-atte-Bow, and hence bread to the City. It was the channels created for these mills that caused the Bow Back Rivers to be cut through the former Roman stone causeway at Stratford (from which the name is derived).

The River Lea flows through the old brewing and malting centre of Ware, and consequently transport by water was for many years a significant industry based there. Barley was transported into Ware, and malt out via the river, in particular to London. Bargemen born in Ware were given the "freedom of the River Thames" — avoiding the requirement of paying lock dues — as a result of their transport of fresh water and food to London during The Great Plague of 1665–66. A local legend says that dead bodies were brought out of London at that time via the river for burying in Ware, but there is no evidence for this.

The extensive level of waterborne trade led the historian John Stow, writing in 1603, to describe the Lea as "this pleasant and useful river".

The riverside has hosted a number of major armaments manufacturers, such as the Waltham Abbey Royal Gunpowder Mills, the Royal Small Arms Factory at Enfield Lock (which is now a housing development known as Enfield Island Village) and the Congreve Rocket Factory on the site of Stratford Langthorne Abbey.

The river Lea formed an important part of the development of one of the UK's historically most important aircraft manufacturers, Avro. The railway arch where A.V. Roe in 1909 built and achieved the first all-British powered flight still stands next to the river Lea on the Walthamstow Marshes.

=== Management of the river ===
Improvements were made to the river from 1424, with tolls being levied to compensate the landowners, and in 1571, there were riots after the extension of the River was promoted in a private bill presented to the House of Commons. By 1577, the first lock was established at Waltham Abbey and the river began to be actively managed for navigation.

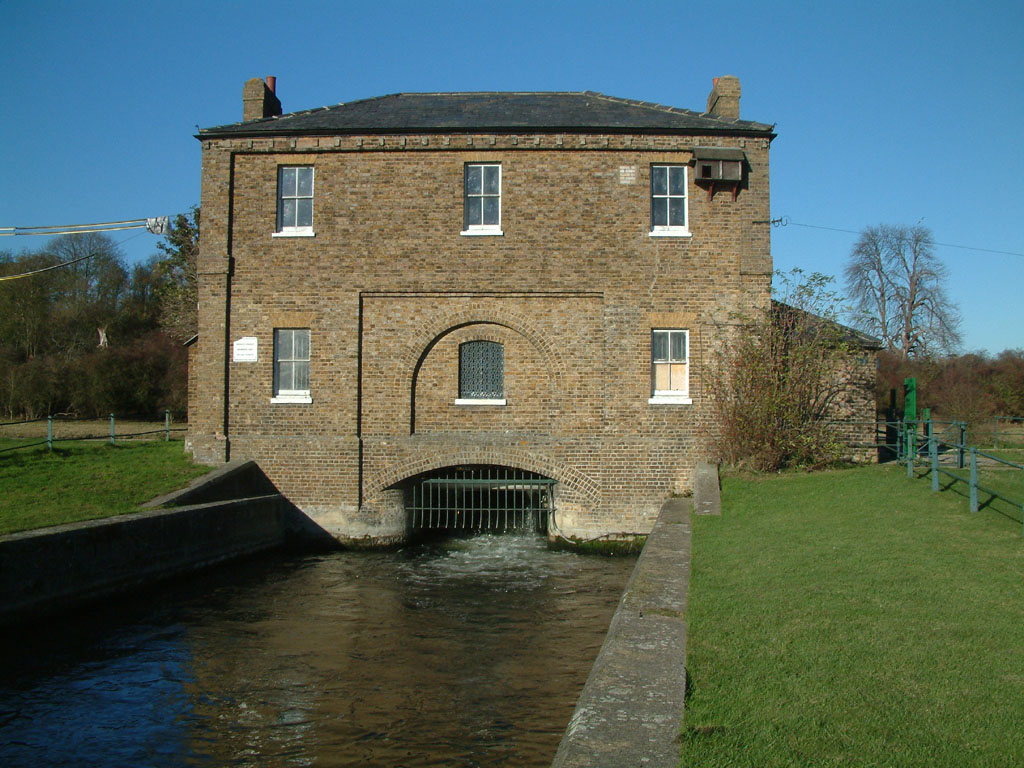
The New Gauge House, where water leaves the River Lea at the start of the New River

The New River was constructed in 1613 to take clean water to London, from the Lea and its catchment areas in Hertfordshire and bypass the polluting industries that had developed in the Lea's downstream reaches. The artificial channel further reduced the flow to the natural river and by 1767 locks were installed below Hertford Castle Weir on the canalised part of the Lea, now the Lee Navigation with further locks and canalisation taking place during the succeeding centuries. In 1766, work also began on the Limehouse Cut to connect the river, at Bromley-by-Bow, with the Thames at Limehouse Basin.

The Waterworks River, a part of the tidal Bow Back Rivers, has been widened by 8 metres (26 ft) and canalised to assist with construction of the Olympic Park for the 2012 Summer Olympics. In 2009, Three Mills Lock was installed on the Prescott Channel to maintain water levels on the Lea, within the park at a depth of 2 metres (7 ft). This allowed access to the site by 350–tonne barges with the aim that at least half of the material required for construction could be delivered or removed by water.

In January 2024, the River Lea burst its banks as Hackney Wick residents tell of 'knee-high' flood water.

=== War and conflict ===
Millfields Park on the Lea at Hackney, is the reputed site of a victory of Aescwine of Essex over Octa of Kent in 527, which allowed Aescwine to become the first King of Essex. However, the historicity of these events and the very existence of Aescwine are disputed.

Somewhere between 878 and 890, the Treaty of Alfred and Guthrum was drawn up that amongst other things used the course of the Lea to define the border between the Danes and the English. In 894, a force of Danes sailed up the river to Hertford, and in about 895 they built a fortified camp, in the higher reaches of the Lea, about 20 miles (32.2 km) north of London. Alfred the Great saw an opportunity to defeat the Danes and dug a new channel to lower the level of the river, leaving the Danes stranded.

In 1216, during the First Barons' War, the future Louis VIII of France besieged Hertford Castle for a month, leading to its surrender. He only held the castle for a relatively short time as he lost the war soon after.

In 1648 during the second English Civil War a Royalist force crossed the Thames from Greenwich and hoped to cross Bow Bridge, over the Lea and into Essex. After inconclusive clashes with the Tower Hamlets Militia and other Parliamentarian forces, an engagement known as the Battle of Bow Bridge, the Royalists headed for Colchester and were besieged there.

During WWI, parts of London on either side of the Lea were badly hit by German Army and Navy airship raids. It is believed the crews mistook the extensive reservoir chain for the Thames and released their bombs on what they took to be central London.

== Environmental issues ==
The ecological, landscape and recreational importance of the river and its surrounding land has been recognised through inclusion in a number of parks and by several planning policy designations.

=== Management and designations ===
Much of the river lies within the Lee Valley Park. Some of the land surrounding the river has been designated as Metropolitan Green Belt or Metropolitan Open Land in order to prevent further urbanisation.

=== Wildlife ===
The river contains fish and other wildlife such as the occasional seal.

Some boat trippers reported observing on 5 August 2005 a Canada goose being pulled underwater very quickly. The London Wildlife Trust suggested that this was most likely caused by a pike.

In 2011, Mike Wells claimed that he saw a "goose go vertically down" in the river. Again a pike or mink was suggested as most likely. Vice Magazine suggested that Wells' story may have been invented to publicise authorities' attempts to evict houseboats from the area that year, ahead of the 2012 Olympic Games. However wels catfish, (silurus glanis) a non native species are known to live in the river,

=== Pollution ===
The river is threatened by pollution, with sewage frequently discharged into the river as well as less common events causing major damage, such as an oil leak in 2018, or the toxic runoff from a warehouse fire in 2019. The sewage pollution, as well as that of fertiliser washed in from agricultural fields causes eutrophication, an excess of nutrients, which not only unbalances the ecosystem, but also leads to de-oxygenation of the water.

Dumping, litter and microplastics are a major problem on the Lea with much of this waste arriving in the river in sewage. In April 2021, Hackney Council wrote to the Environment Agency calling for action to address sewage discharge and pollution in the river. In November 2021, local volunteers stated they were removing 100 kg of plastic pollution from the Lower Lea every month.

Water extraction, for drinking water, farming and industry, has led to a reduction in river flow impacting wildlife and concentrating the pollutants present in the remaining river water.

Projects such as that led by Thames21 installing reedbeds help to remove pollutants whilst oxygenating the water, as well as creating habitat for the likes of water voles and improving the aesthetics of the man-made concrete sections of the canalised river.

== Sport ==
In their early days, Tottenham Hotspur played their games at Tottenham Marshes on the Middle Lea while Leyton Orient have had a number of home grounds in the Lower Lea Valley, with both having their current grounds within a mile of the river. West Ham United was established as the works team of the Thames Ironworks, a shipyard which straddled either side of the Lea at its confluence with the Thames.

The 2012 Olympics was focused in the Queen Elizabeth Olympic Park on the banks of the Lea, and its main Stadium, on an island between two branches of the river, is now home to West Ham United. The Lee Valley White Water Centre in Hertfordshire is another sporting legacy of the games.

== Narrative accounts ==
=== London Bridge Is Falling Down ===
Various versions of the nursery rhyme London Bridge Is Falling Down make reference to Bow Bridge. The oldest known version could be that recalled by a correspondent to the Gentleman's Magazine in 1823, in which he claimed to have heard from a woman who was a child in the reign of Charles II (r. 1660–1685) and had the lyrics:

London Bridge is broken down,
Dance over the Lady Lea;
London Bridge is broken down,
With a gay lay-dee.

There are a number of theories about the identity of the Fair Lady, including the idea that it may refer to Matilda, the builder of Bow Bridge and its neighbours, or that it may apply to the River Lea itself.

=== Other ===
The poem A Tale of Two Swannes is set along the River Lea. It was written by William Vallans and published in 1590.

The old course of the river is the one featured in the early chapters of the classic fishing book The Compleat Angler by Izaak Walton. The author begins at Tottenham and proceeds upriver from there.

A guide to walking along the river valley was written by Leigh Hatts, and an account of a walk along the complete length of the river in 2009 was published as a blog by "Diamond Geezer".

In 2014, German writer Esther Kinsky published a novel, Am Fluß, now available in English as River, translated by Iain Galbraith, based around her walks along the lower Lea from the marina at Horseshoe Point to its confluence with the Thames.

In 2015, singer-songwriter Adele dedicated a track to the river on her third studio album, 25.

== Notable fisheries ==
- Amwell Magna Fishery
- Carthagena Weir
- Dobbs Weir
- Fishers Green
- Kings Weir

== Tributaries ==
- For a full list of tributaries, please expand the box entitled 'River Lea / Lee, England' at the bottom of this page.

== See also ==
- List of dams and reservoirs in the United Kingdom
- List of rivers of England
- Tributaries of the River Thames
- Walthamstow Pumphouse Museum

Next confluence upstream	River Thames	Next confluence downstream
River Ravensbourne (south)	River Lea	River Roding (north)
