= Lealands High School =

Coordinates: 51.918°N 0.470°W

Location
- Sundon Park Road; Luton, Bedfordshire, LU3 3AL; England

Information
- Type: Comprehensive
- Local authority: Luton
- Department for Education URN: 109686 Tables
- Ofsted: Reports
- Chair of Governing Body: Amy Sheridan
- Headteacher: Sam Ward
- Staff: 150
- Gender: Mixed
- Age: 11 to 16
- Enrolment: 1050
- Motto: Aspire, Believe, Achieve
- Telephone: 01582 611600
- Website: http://www.lealands.luton.sch.uk/

Lealands High School, formerly Sundon Park Comprehensive School, is a foundation school for 11 to 16 year olds located in Sundon Park, Luton. The school attracts students from Sundon Park and across Luton and Bedfordshire. It was judged good with outstanding behaviour and safety by Ofsted in 2013 and confirmed to continue being a good school overall in March 2017 following a short inspection by Ofsted. In 2014 the school was placed in the top 100 most improved secondary schools for GCSE results including English and maths over a sustained period. Main feeder schools include Sundon Park Juniors School, Leagrave Primary and Pirton Hill, although students join Lealands from primary schools across Luton and the surrounding areas.

== Specialism ==
As of September 2006, the school was awarded 'Specialist Sports College' status. This was part of a nationwide plan spearheaded by the Department of Education to raise standards in education. The school has seen various improvements in its facilities since being awarded the status. The specialist school programme has now ended, but Lealands High School continues to offer sport as a specialism.

== Facilities ==
The school has three stories and facilities include a swimming pool, tennis courts, sports hall, dance studio, science laboratories, technology workshops and music studios.

== Curriculum ==
Subjects offered in the first three years at the school are as follows:
English, Maths, Science, Drama, History, Geography, Religious Studies, a modern language (French or Spanish), Music, Physical Education and Dance, Art, Technology, Computing, Personal, Social & Health Education (PSHE) and Citizenship.

== Notable former pupils ==
- Sharna Jackson, children's author
- Myles Smith, Singer and Songwriter
- Paul James Houghton, filmmaker
- Marion King, President UK & Ireland of MasterCard UK from 2012 to October 2014, and Chief Executive from 2002 to 2011 of BACS
- Christian Chigozie, senior footballer for Luton Town F.C
- Luca Williams-Barnett, footballer for Tottenham Hotspur
