= Waulud's Bank =

Possible Neolithic henge in Leagrave, Luton, England

- Interactive map of Waulud's Bank
- 51°54′37″N 0°27′30″W
- Type: Domestic enclosure or Henge
- Periods: Neolithic
- Location: Leagrave, Luton
- Region: Bedfordshire, England

Site notes
- Condition: ruin

Waulud's Bank is a possible Neolithic henge in Leagrave, Luton, England dating from 3000 BC.

The Waulud's Bank earthworks are in the north of Luton on the edge of Leagrave Common, with central Leagrave to the south east and Marsh Farm to the west. The River Lea runs alongside on the western side, its source located within the vicinity of the surrounding marsh. Archaeological excavations in 1953, 1971 and 1982 date the site to around 3000 BC, in the Neolithic period, although there was evidence of earlier mesolithic hunter/fisher activity in the immediate area.

The 'D' shape of the earthwork is almost identical to that of Marden Henge in Wiltshire, both sites have a river forming one side, and each produced neolithic grooved-ware pottery. Waulud's Bank lies on a glacial ridge near which runs the prehistoric Icknield Way. Initially it was probably a domestic enclosure used for cattle herding. It has been suggested that it later became a henge monument, although the position of its surrounding ditch outside its timber-faced bank would be unusual. Archaeological evidence suggests that the site was briefly re-used in the Iron Age, during the Roman occupation and in medieval times.

The enclosure consists of a bank and external ditch of around 7 hectares with a turf-revetted chalk and gravel bank faced by a wooden stockade. No entrances have been identified. Most external features have been destroyed by a 19th-century gravel quarry on the south, and the dumping of tons of chalk and top-soil along the eastern side during building construction of Marsh Farm in the 1970s. Geophysical surveys in July 1985 and January 2009 failed to reveal any very positive indications of internal features.

The bank stands 2.6 metres (8.5 ft) high in places; on the north side the excavated ditch was 9.2 metres (30 ft) wide and 2.1 metres (6.9 ft) deep. Finds included neolithic pottery, animal bones and flint arrow heads, some on display at Stockwood Heritage Centre, Luton Museum.

The building at the edge of Waulud's Bank was a one time farmhouse called Marsh Farm House, the occupants of which owned the area that later became Marsh Farm.

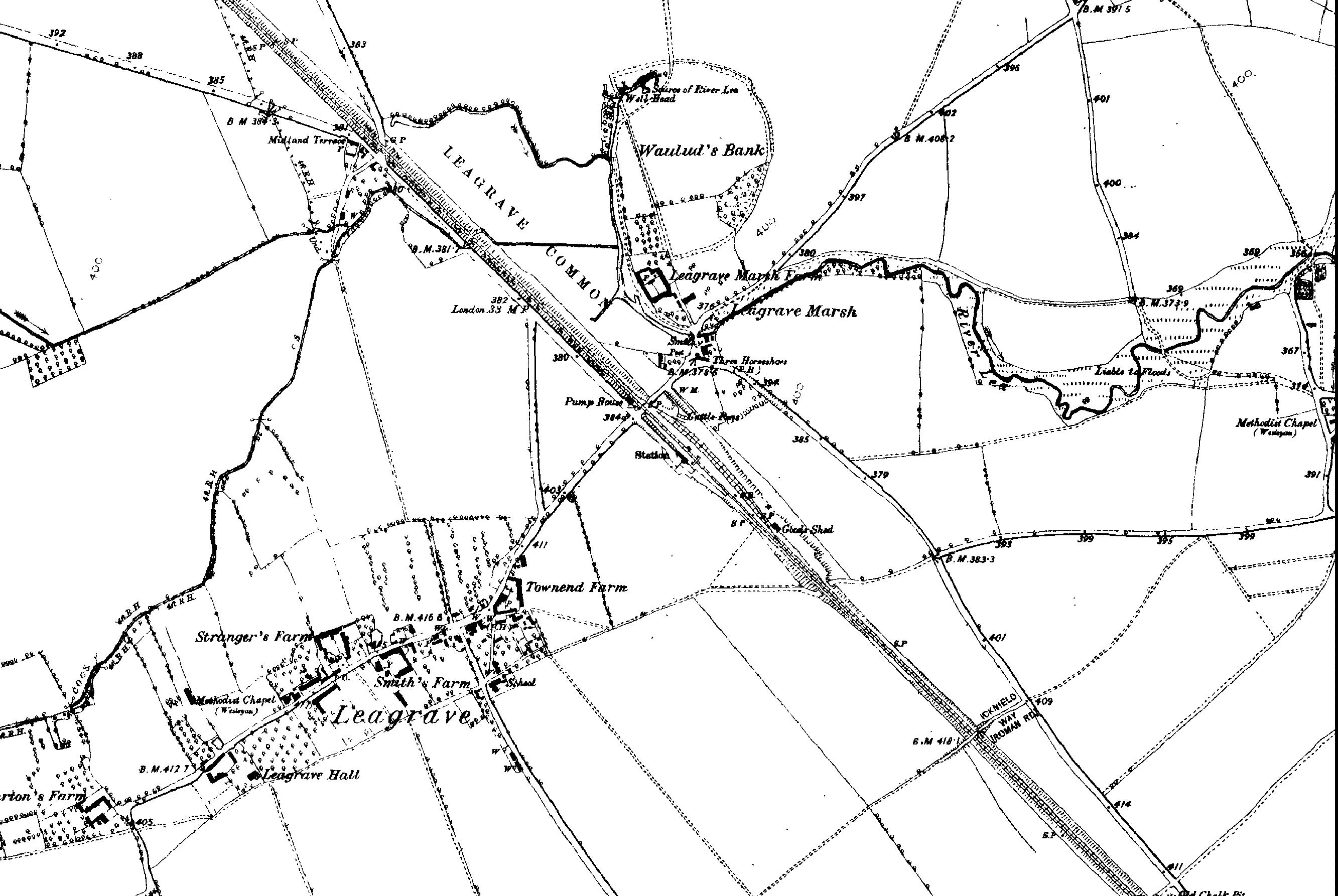
Map showing Wauluds Bank and Leagrave from 1889

== Myths and legends ==
The source of the River Lea is known as the 'Five-Springs' and lies in the north-west corner of Wauluds Bank. According to legend, the Celtic god Lug (or 'Lud' or 'Lyg') presided over the springs.

Lug is the Celtic god of light, and the name 'Lea' may be derived from this name. The town now known as Luton is named after this river which may mean the river of the god Lugus. 'Ton' is an Old English name for a town or large settlement. So Luton could mean "the town on the river of Lugus", although this is speculation.

The English Heritage record notes that Waulud may be a corruption of the name Wayland (the smith) who was a Norse god, also known as Wolund, Weyland or Weland (see also Wayland's Smithy). The record also mentions that "some early writers" believed Waulud's Bank to be a place called Lygeanburgh (the similarly sounding Limbury meaning a fortified place on the river Lea is nearby). This was one of four settlements mentioned in the Anglo-Saxon Chronicle captured by Cuthwulf (Prince of Wessex) in 571 AD. Lygeanburgh and Limbury were almost certainly the same place, but so far there has been no excavated evidence to link them directly with Waulud's Bank.

There are no foundations for rumours that a substantial Roman villa once existed in Bramingham Road which borders Waulud's Bank. As mentioned above the site is close to the point where the prehistoric Icknield Way fords the river Lea, and about 5 miles (8 km) in distance from Watling Street in Dunstable - also connected with Roman history.
