= Luton Borough Council elections =

Local government elections in Bedfordshire, England

Ward boundaries in Luton as used between 2003 and 2023.

Luton Borough Council is the local authority for the unitary authority of Luton in Bedfordshire, England. Until 1 April 1997 it was a non-metropolitan district.

== Council elections ==
Composition of the council
Year	Conservative	Labour	Liberal Democrats (Note: Includes totals for the predecessors of the Liberal Democrats, the Liberal Party and SDP (both of which participated in the Alliance).)	Independents & Others	Council control after election
Local government reorganisation; council established (48 seats)
1973	12	30	6	0	Labour
New ward boundaries (48 seats)
1976	37	10	1	0	Conservative
1979	32	16	0	0	Conservative
1983	25	17	6	0	Conservative
1987	32	13	3	0	Conservative
1991	11	28	9	0	Labour
1995	2	37	9	0	Labour
Luton becomes a unitary authority
1996	3	36	9	0	Labour
1999	3	36	9	0	Labour
New ward boundaries (48 seats)
2003	4	23	20	1	No overall control
2007	5	26	17	0	Labour
2011	4	36	8	0	Labour
2015	5	35	8	0	Labour
2019	4	32	12	0	Labour
New ward boundaries (48 seats)
2023	3	30	15	0	Labour

== Results maps ==
2003 results map

2007 results map

2011 results map

2015 results map

2019 results map

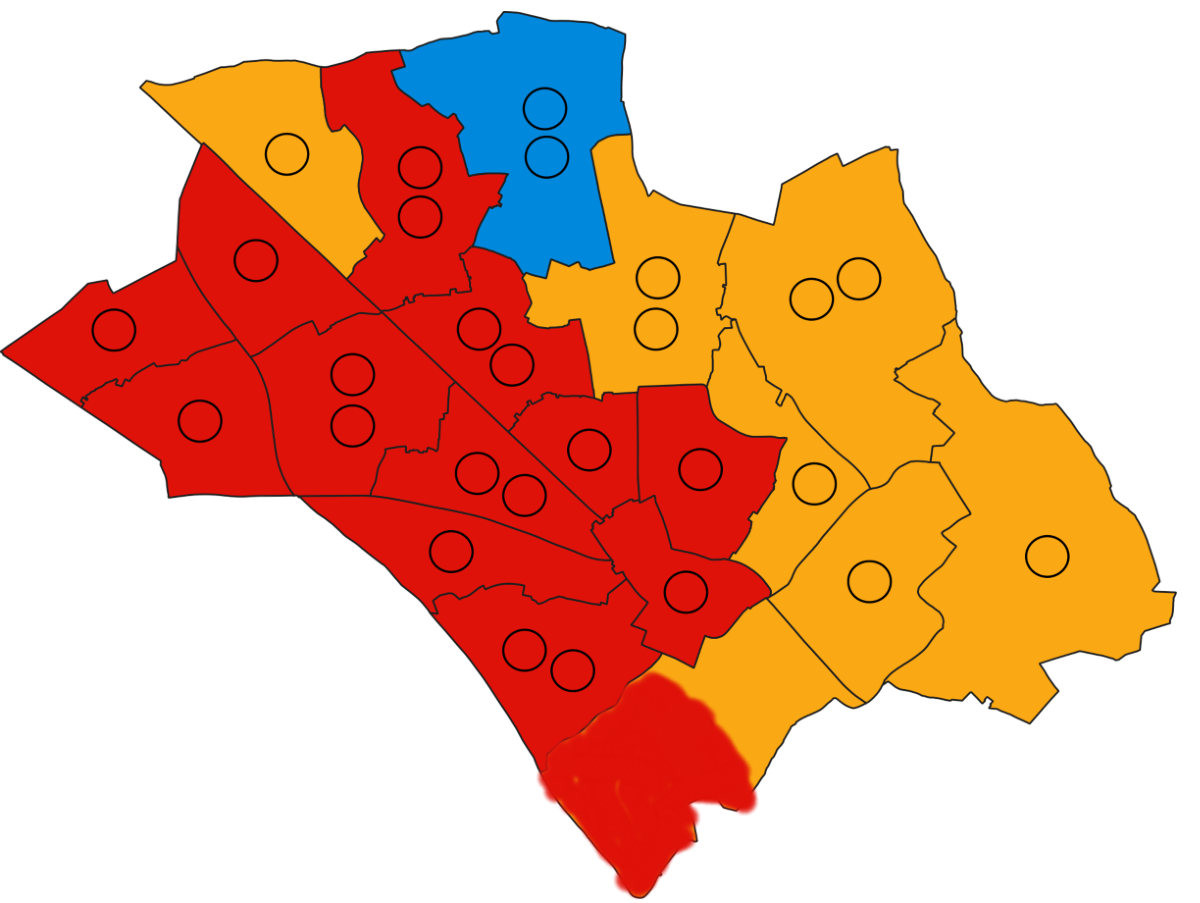

== By-election results ==
=== 2003-2007 ===
Lewsey Ward, 3 March 2005
Party	Candidate	Votes	%	±%
Labour	Joan Bailey	778	51.9	−2.8
Liberal Democrats		349	23.3	+3.0
Conservative		244	16.3	−8.7
UKIP		98	6.5	+6.5
Green		29	1.9	+1.9
Majority		429	28.6	
Turnout		1,498		
Labour hold		Swing		

Vacancy arose from the death of Mick Hand (Labour).

Farley Ward, 30 June 2005
Party	Candidate	Votes	%	±%
Labour	Mahmood Hussain	950	67.2	+8.3
Conservative		207	14.6	−5.5
Liberal Democrats		179	12.7	−3.9
Green		43	3.0	+3.0
UKIP		34	2.4	−2.1
Majority		743	52.6	
Turnout		1,413		
Labour hold		Swing		

Vacancy arose from the resignation of Bill McKenzie (Labour).

=== 2007-2011 ===
South Ward, 6 May 2010
Party	Candidate	Votes	%	±%
Labour	Keir Gale	1,493	42.9	+0.3
Conservative	Peter Banks-Smith	1,015	29.2	−2.2
Liberal Democrats	Richard Hayward	616	17.7	+5.1
UKIP	Lance Richardson	201	5.8	+5.8
Green	Marc Scheimann	155	4.5	−9.0
Majority		478	13.7	
Turnout		3,480		
Labour hold		Swing		

Vacancy arose from the disqualification of Michelle Kiansumba (Labour).

=== 2011-2015 ===
Wigmore Ward, 10 April 2013
Party	Candidate	Votes	%	±%
Liberal Democrats	Alan Skepelhorn	982	46.3	+4.0
Labour	James Taylor	517	24.4	+0.7
Conservative	John Young	281	13.3	−11.0
UKIP	Lance Richardson	230	10.9	+1.1
Green	Marc Scheimann	82	3.9	+3.9
Independent	John Magill	27	1.3	+1.3
Majority		465	21.9	
Turnout		2,119		
Liberal Democrats hold		Swing		

Vacancy arose from the death of Roy Davies (Liberal Democrats).

Farley Ward, 13 March 2014
Party	Candidate	Votes	%	±%
Labour	Paul Castleman	1,232	72.5	+17.6
UKIP	Charles Lawman	226	13.3	+5.6
Conservative	David Coulter	154	9.1	−8.9
Liberal Democrats	Anne Mead	46	2.7	−7.7
Green	Marc Scheimann	41	2.4	+2.4
Majority		1,006	59.2	
Turnout		1,699		
Labour hold		Swing		

Vacancy arose from the resignation of Robin Harris (Labour).

=== 2015-2019 ===
High Town Ward, 30 June 2016
Party	Candidate	Votes	%	±%
Labour	Maahwish Mirza	505	39.6	−11.8
Green	Lyn Bliss	274	21.4	+4.7
Liberal Democrats	Clive Mead	181	14.2	+14.2
Conservative	Sue Garrett	141	11.0	−20.9
Independent	John French	102	8.0	+8.0
UKIP	Grace Froggatt	69	5.4	+5.4
Majority		232	18.3	
Turnout		1,271		
Labour hold		Swing		

Vacancy arose from the resignation of Aysegul Gurbuz (Labour).

Sundon Park Ward, 8 June 2017
Party	Candidate	Votes	%	±%
Labour	Martin Rogers	1,919	49.8	+10.4
Liberal Democrats	Clive Mead	957	24.8	−9.7
Conservative	Morel Benard	908	23.5	−2.5
Green	Simon Hall	72	1.9	+1.9
Majority		962	24.9	
Turnout		3,856		
Labour hold		Swing		

Vacancy arose from the resignation of Fiona Green (Labour).

Limbury Ward, 20 September 2018
Party	Candidate	Votes	%	±%
Labour	Amy Nicholls	692	48.3	−12.0
Conservative	Heather Baker	396	27.7	−12.0
Liberal Democrats	Steve Moore	344	24.0	+24.0
Majority		296	20.7	
Turnout		1,432		
Labour hold		Swing		

Vacancy arose from the resignation of Jennifer Rowlands (Labour).

=== 2019-2023 ===
Icknield Ward, 26 September 2019
Party	Candidate	Votes	%	±%
Labour	Asif Masood	585	36.7	−5.6
Conservative	John Baker	563	35.4	−8.8
Liberal Democrats	Steve Moore	407	25.6	+12.1
Green	Marc Scheimann	37	2.3	+2.3
Majority		22	1.4	
Turnout		1,592		
Labour gain from Conservative		Swing		

Vacancy arose from the death of Mike Garrett (Conservative).

High Town Ward, 6 May 2021
Party	Candidate	Votes	%	±%
Labour	Umme Ali	717	48.3	−12.7
Conservative	Shakaina Khan	327	22.0	+5.2
Green	Lyn Bliss	202	13.6	+13.6
Liberal Democrats	Nigel Marshall	202	13.6	+13.6
Communist	Markus Kearney	36	2.4	+2.4
Majority		390	26.3	
Turnout		1,484		
Labour hold		Swing		

Vacancy arose from the resignation of Rachel Hopkins (Labour).

Round Green Ward, 6 May 2021
Party	Candidate	Votes	%	±%
Liberal Democrats	Steve Moore	1,041	38.5	−6.2
Labour	Fatima Begum	910	33.7	−1.1
Conservative	Phil Turner	520	19.2	+2.9
Green	James Cullinane	173	6.4	+6.4
Independent	Marc Scheimann	60	2.2	+2.2
Majority		131	4.8	
Turnout		2,704		
Liberal Democrats gain from Labour		Swing		

Vacancy arose from the resignation of Mark Rivers (Labour).

South Ward, 28 October 2021
Party	Candidate	Votes	%	±%
Labour	Fatima Begum	547	44.1	+4.3
Liberal Democrats	Nigel Marshall	332	26.8	+26.8
Conservative	Abid Aziz	198	16.0	+0.2
Independent	Marc Scheimann	134	10.8	+10.8
Communist	Markus Keaney	28	2.3	+2.3
Majority		215	17.4	
Turnout		1,239		
Labour hold		Swing		

Vacancy arose from the death of Paul Castleman (Labour). Marc Scheimann contested the ward for the Green Party in 2019, receiving 18.9%.

Dallow Ward, 4 August 2022
Party	Candidate	Votes	%	±%
Labour	Alia Khan	1,486	53.6	−12.8
Liberal Democrats	Basharat Hussain	1,076	38.8	+38.8
Conservative	Malik Azad Nikyalvi	154	5.6	−7.5
Independent	Marc Scheimann	58	2.1	+2.1
Majority		410	14.8	
Turnout		2,774		
Labour hold		Swing		

Vacancy arose from the disqualification of Hannah Adrees (Labour).

=== 2023-2027 ===
Barnfield Ward, 26 September 2024
Party	Candidate	Votes	%	±%
Liberal Democrats	Anwar Malik	1,169	63.5	
Labour	Karen Roy	321	17.4	
Conservative	Ash Ali	209	11.4	
Green	Edward Carpenter	110	6.0	
Independent	Marc Scheimann	32	1.7	
Majority		848	46.1	
Turnout		1,841		
Liberal Democrats hold		Swing		

Vacancy arose from the resignation of Jeff Petts (Liberal Democrats).

Wigmore Ward, 26 September 2024
Party	Candidate	Votes	%	±%
Liberal Democrats	Adrees Latif	749	54.6	
Independent	Carolyn Cottier	209	15.2	
Conservative	Philip Turner	151	11.0	
Labour	Farid Ahmed	137	10.0	
Green	Elissa Gordon	125	9.1	
Majority		540	39.4	
Turnout		1,371		
Liberal Democrats hold		Swing		

Vacancy arose from the resignation of Claire Gallagher (Liberal Democrats).

Stopsley Ward, 4 September 2025
Party	Candidate	Votes	%	±%
Liberal Democrats	Matt Fry	935	41.3	
Reform	Jim Cohen	820	36.2	
Labour	Moazzem Hussain	251	11.1	
Conservative	Roger Nichols	152	6.7	
Green	Edward Carpenter	87	3.8	
Independent	Marc Scheimann	19	0.8	
Majority		115	5.1	
Turnout		2,264		
Liberal Democrats hold		Swing		

Vacancy arose from the death of David Wynn (Liberal Democrats).

Wigmore Ward, 2 April 2026
Party	Candidate	Votes	%	±%
Reform	James Fletcher	576	32.9	
Liberal Democrats	George Neculaiu	533	30.4	
Green	Carolyn Cottier	344	19.6	
Labour	Georgia Marcantonio	170	9.7	
Conservative	Sam Choudhury	116	6.6	
Independent	Marc Scheimann	13	0.7	
Majority		43	2.5	
Turnout		1,752		
Reform gain from Liberal Democrats		Swing		

Vacancy arose from the disqualification of Alan Skepelhorn (Liberal Democrats) due to non-attendance.

== See also ==
- Politics in Luton
