= 2019 Luton Borough Council election =

2019 UK local government election

← 2015	2 May 2019	2023 →

All 48 seats to Luton Borough Council 25 seats needed for a majority

	First party	Second party	Third party
Leader	Hazel Simmons	David Franks
Party	Labour	Liberal Democrats	Conservative
Last election	35 seats, 53.5%	8 seats, 14.5%	5 seats, 27.5%
Seats won	32	12	4
Seat change	▼3	▲4	▼1
Popular vote	55,649	16,944	18,897
Percentage	56.7%	17.2%	19.2%
Swing	▲3.2%	▲2.7%	▼8.3%
- Map showing the results by ward

The 2019 Luton Borough Council election took place on 2 May 2019 to elect members of the Luton Borough Council in England. It was held on the same day as other local elections.

== Results summary ==
2019 Luton Borough Council election
Party	Candidates	Seats	Gains	Losses	Net gain/loss	Seats %	Votes %	Votes	+/−
Labour	48	32	0	3	▼3	66.7	56.7	55,649	+3.2
Liberal Democrats	19	12	4	0	▲4	25.0	17.2	16,944	+2.7
Conservative	43	4	0	1	▼1	8.3	19.2	18,897	–8.3
Independent	7	0	0	0	Steady	0.0	3.9	3,796	+3.8
UKIP	4	0	0	0	Steady	0.0	1.5	1,440	–2.1
Best4Luton	3	0	0	0	Steady	0.0	1.1	1,057	N/A
Green	1	0	0	0	Steady	0.0	0.5	445	–0.3

== Ward results ==
Ward boundaries

=== Barnfield ===
Barnfield
Party	Candidate	Votes	%	±%
Liberal Democrats	David Franks	1,194	54.8	
Liberal Democrats	Amjid Ali	970	44.5	
Labour	Haleema Ali	662	30.4	
Labour	Fahim Qureshi	607	27.9	
Conservative	Dean Garrett	348	16.0	
Conservative	Asif Choudhery	330	15.1	
Majority				
Turnout		2,179	37.7	
Liberal Democrats hold		Swing		
Liberal Democrats gain from Labour		Swing		

=== Biscot ===
Biscot
Party	Candidate	Votes	%	±%
Labour	Kashif Choudry	2,006	55.7	
Labour	Abid Hussain	1,981	55.0	
Labour	Saima Hussain	1,909	53.0	
Independent	Fazilat Ali-Khan	1,089	30.2	New
Independent	Shana Begum	1,026	28.5	New
Liberal Democrats	Usman Hussain	552	15.3	
Conservative	Grace Froggatt	281	7.8	
Conservative	Mohammed Nisar	194	5.4	
Majority				
Turnout		3,601	35.8	
Labour hold		Swing		
Labour hold		Swing		
Labour hold		Swing		

=== Bramingham ===
Bramingham
Party	Candidate	Votes	%	±%
Conservative	Gilbert Campbell	904	54.8	
Conservative	John Young	884	53.6	
Labour	Desmond Billington	606	36.7	
Labour	Tunde Ajisola	570	34.5	
Majority				
Turnout		1,650	29.4	
Conservative hold		Swing		
Conservative hold		Swing		

=== Challney ===
Challney
Party	Candidate	Votes	%	±%
Labour	Tom Shaw	1,940	69.2	
Labour	Tahir Malik	1,790	63.8	
Labour	Khtija Malik	1,785	63.6	
Conservative	Fathima Kauser	503	17.9	
Conservative	Gulraiz Khan	453	16.1	
UKIP	Alan Usher	347	12.4	
Conservative	Mohammad Zia	347	12.4	
Majority				
Turnout		2,805	29.6	
Labour hold		Swing		
Labour hold		Swing		
Labour hold		Swing		

=== Crawley ===
Crawley
Party	Candidate	Votes	%	±%
Liberal Democrats	Terry Keens	885	52.6	
Liberal Democrats	Lee Bridgen	881	52.4	
Labour	James Taylor	428	25.5	
Labour	Fatima Begum	422	25.1	
Conservative	Anwar Hussain	274	16.3	
Conservative	Alan Hamilton	206	12.3	
Majority				
Turnout		1,681	30.8	
Liberal Democrats gain from Labour		Swing		
Liberal Democrats hold		Swing		

=== Dallow ===
Dallow
Party	Candidate	Votes	%	±%
Labour	Hannah Adrees	2,606	73.7	
Labour	Abbas Hussain	2,338	66.2	
Labour	Raja Ahmed	2,311	65.4	
Independent	Mohammad Ashraf	801	22.7	New
Conservative	Ehtisham Qureshi	515	14.6	
Conservative	Mohammad Azad	462	13.1	
Majority				
Turnout		3,534	34.1	
Labour hold		Swing		
Labour hold		Swing		
Labour hold		Swing		

=== Farley ===
Farley
Party	Candidate	Votes	%	±%
Labour	David Taylor	1,348	67.9	
Labour	Sian Timoney	1,307	65.9	
Labour	Mahmood Hussain	1,304	65.7	
Conservative	Kevin Drew	459	23.1	
Conservative	Shyamal Roy	328	16.5	
Majority				
Turnout		1,984	23.2	
Labour hold		Swing		
Labour hold		Swing		
Labour hold		Swing		

=== High Town ===
High Town
Party	Candidate	Votes	%	±%
Labour	Rachel Hopkins	950	65.7	
Labour	Andy Malcolm	898	62.1	
Conservative	Kevin McLean-Mair	262	18.1	
Independent	Joseph Daniels	196	13.5	New
Conservative	Solomon Muchai	191	13.2	
Best4Luton	Jay Silva	150	10.4	New
Majority				
Turnout		1,447	23.0	
Labour hold		Swing		
Labour hold		Swing		

=== Icknield ===
Icknield
Party	Candidate	Votes	%	±%
Conservative	Jeffrey Petts	822	42.1	
Conservative	Michael Garrett	803	41.2	
Labour	Asif Masood	787	40.3	
Labour	Asma Rathore	663	34.0	
Liberal Democrats	Yvonne Edmunds	251	12.9	
Liberal Democrats	Julia Mead	221	11.3	
Majority				
Turnout		1,951	32.6	
Conservative hold		Swing		
Conservative hold		Swing		

=== Leagrave ===
Leagrave
Party	Candidate	Votes	%	±%
Labour	Maria Lovell	1,297	59.8	
Labour	Waheed Akbar	1,234	56.9	
Labour	Sameera Saleem	1,120	51.6	
Conservative	Susan Garrett	669	30.8	
Conservative	Richard Joyce	575	26.5	
Conservative	Mahrban Khan	510	23.5	
Majority				
Turnout		2,170	24.6	
Labour hold		Swing		
Labour hold		Swing		
Labour hold		Swing		

=== Lewsey ===
Lewsey
Party	Candidate	Votes	%	±%
Labour	Hazel Simmons	1,316	60.9	
Labour	Jacqui Burnett	1,235	57.1	
Labour	Aslam Khan	1,121	51.9	
Conservative	Adrian Noller	480	22.2	
UKIP	Paul Noble	454	21.0	
Conservative	Vahid Zubari	444	20.5	
Majority				
Turnout		2,162	23.3	
Labour hold		Swing		
Labour hold		Swing		
Labour hold		Swing		

=== Limbury ===
Limbury
Party	Candidate	Votes	%	±%
Labour	Amy Nicholls	980	51.6	
Labour	Robert Roche	898	47.2	
Conservative	Aziz Ambia	665	35.0	
Conservative	Heather Baker	583	30.7	
Liberal Democrats	Brian Richardson	181	9.5	New
Liberal Democrats	Sidney Rutstein	137	7.2	
Majority				
Turnout		1,901	31.5	
Labour hold		Swing		
Labour hold		Swing		

=== Northwell ===
Northwell
Party	Candidate	Votes	%	±%
Labour	Anne Donelon	897	67.6	
Labour	Yasmin Waheed	764	57.6	
Conservative	Deloris Campbell	323	24.4	
Conservative	Susan Patel	245	18.5	
Independent	Mahmoona Rasool	99	7.5	New
Majority				
Turnout		1,326	23.4	
Labour hold		Swing		
Labour hold		Swing		

=== Round Green ===
Round Green
Party	Candidate	Votes	%	±%
Labour	Mark Rivers	989	37.8	
Liberal Democrats	David Chapman	917	35.0	
Labour	Tahmina Saleem	913	34.9	
Labour	Irak Chowdhury	900	34.4	
Liberal Democrats	Daniel Willis	841	32.1	
Liberal Democrats	Steve Moore	752	28.7	
Best4Luton	John French	471	18.0	New
Conservative	John Baker	464	17.7	
Conservative	Phil Turner	415	15.9	
Conservative	Mohammad Arif	300	11.5	
Majority				
Turnout		2,617	30.3	
Labour hold		Swing		
Liberal Democrats gain from Conservative		Swing		
Labour hold		Swing		

=== Saints ===
Saints
Party	Candidate	Votes	%	±%
Labour	Javed Hussain	2,460	72.3	
Labour	Summara Khurshid	2,370	69.6	
Labour	Ghulam Javed	2,364	69.4	
Conservative	Raja Saleem	731	21.5	
Conservative	Salma Nasir	715	21.0	
Conservative	Syed Abid	668	19.6	
Majority				
Turnout		3,404	34.0	
Labour hold		Swing		
Labour hold		Swing		
Labour hold		Swing		

=== South ===
South
Party	Candidate	Votes	%	±%
Labour	Paul Castleman	938	53.9	
Labour	David Agbley	813	46.8	
Labour Co-op	Javeria Hussain	710	40.8	
Green	Marc Scheimann	445	25.6	
Conservative	Morel Bernard	373	21.4	
UKIP	Tim James	339	19.5	New
Conservative	Mohammed Islam	316	18.2	
Independent	Conor Clarke	259	14.9	New
Majority				
Turnout		1,739	17.1	
Labour hold		Swing		
Labour hold		Swing		
Labour Co-op hold		Swing		

=== Stopsley ===
Stopsley
Party	Candidate	Votes	%	±%
Liberal Democrats	Richard Underwood	1,320	68.0	
Liberal Democrats	David Wynn	1,267	65.3	
Conservative	Gordon Shrosbree	333	17.2	
Conservative	Margaret Simons	295	15.2	
Labour	Abbi Adeyemi	247	12.7	
Labour	Urmila Afroz	247	12.7	
Majority				
Turnout		1,941	35.8	
Liberal Democrats hold		Swing		
Liberal Democrats hold		Swing		

=== Sundon Park ===
Sundon Park
Party	Candidate	Votes	%	±%
Liberal Democrats	Anna Pedersen	927	50.0	
Liberal Democrats	Clive Mead	867	46.8	
Labour	Martin Rodgers	694	37.4	
Labour	Sasha Smith	605	32.6	
Conservative	Michael Glover	234	12.6	
Conservative	Claire Shrosbree	177	9.5	
Majority				
Turnout		1,854	31.6	
Liberal Democrats hold		Swing		
Liberal Democrats gain from Labour		Swing		

=== Wigmore ===
Wigmore
Party	Candidate	Votes	%	±%
Liberal Democrats	Peter Chapman	1,658	56.0	
Liberal Democrats	Diane Moles	1,569	53.0	
Liberal Democrats	Alan Skepelhorn	1,554	52.5	
Labour	Markus Keaney	497	16.8	
Labour	Sara Miah	454	15.3	
Best4Luton	Carolyn Cottier	436	14.7	New
Independent	Marco Suadoni	425	14.4	New
Labour	Mominur Murad	412	13.9	
Conservative	Grahame Mackay	324	10.9	
UKIP	Lance Richardson	300	10.1	
Conservative	Sam Deekue	259	8.7	
Conservative	Yasin Rehman	233	7.9	
Majority				
Turnout		2,961	34.5	
Liberal Democrats hold		Swing		
Liberal Democrats hold		Swing		
Liberal Democrats hold		Swing		

== Changes 2019–2023 ==
Jeff Petts, elected as a Conservative councillor, joined the Liberal Democrats in December 2021.

Abbas Hussain, elected as a Labour councillor, had the Labour whip withdrawn in 2022. He subsequently sat as an independent councillor until January 2023, when he joined the Liberal Democrats.

In March 2023, three Labour councillors who were not re-selected to be Labour candidates at the 2023 election left the party; two (Ghulam Javed and Summara Khurshid) joined the Liberal Democrats and one (Anne Donelon) sat as an independent.

By-elections between the 2019 and 2023 elections were as follows:

=== Icknield ===
Icknield: 26 September 2019
Party	Candidate	Votes	%	±%
Labour	Asif Masood	585	36.7	
Conservative	John Baker	563	35.4	
Liberal Democrats	Steve Moore	407	25.6	
Green	Marc Scheimann	37	2.3	N/A
Majority		22	1.3	
Turnout		1,592	27.2	−5.4
Labour gain from Conservative		Swing		

=== High Town ===
High Town: 6 May 2021
Party	Candidate	Votes	%	±%
Labour	Umme Ali	717	48.3	−12.7
Conservative	Shakaina Khan	327	22.0	+5.2
Green	Lyn Bliss	202	13.6	N/A
Liberal Democrats	Nigel Marshall	202	13.6	N/A
Communist	Markus Kearney	36	2.4	N/A
Majority		390	26.3	
Turnout		1,484	23.0	–
Labour hold		Swing	▼9.0	

=== Round Green ===
Round Green: 6 May 2021
Party	Candidate	Votes	%	±%
Liberal Democrats	Steve Moore	1,041	38.5	+6.2
Labour	Fatima Begum	910	33.7	−1.1
Conservative	Phil Turner	520	19.2	+2.9
Green	James Cullinane	173	6.4	N/A
Independent	Marc Scheimann	60	2.2	N/A
Majority		131	4.8	
Turnout		2,704	31.4	+1.1
Liberal Democrats gain from Labour		Swing	▲3.7	

=== South ===
South: 28 October 2021
Party	Candidate	Votes	%	±%
Labour	Fatima Begum	547	44.1	−9.8
Liberal Democrats	Nigel Marshall	332	26.8	N/A
Conservative	Abid Aziz	198	16.0	−5.4
Independent	Marc Scheimann	134	10.8	N/A
Communist	Markus Keaney	28	2.3	N/A
Majority		215	17.4	
Turnout		1,239	12.0	−5.1
Labour hold				

=== Dallow ===
Dallow: 4 August 2022
Party	Candidate	Votes	%	±%
Labour	Alia Khan	1,486	53.6	−20.1
Liberal Democrats	Basharat Hussain	1,076	38.8	N/A
Conservative	Malik Nikyalvi	154	5.6	−17.1
Independent	Marc Scheimann	58	2.1	N/A
Majority		410	14.8	
Turnout		2,774	26.9	−7.2
Labour hold				
