= 1976 Luton Borough Council election =

Local election in England

- 6 May 1976

All 48 seats to Luton Borough Council 25 seats needed for a majority

	First party	Second party	Third party
Party	Conservative	Labour	Liberal
Seats won	37	10	1
Seat change	▲25	▼20	▼5
Popular vote	60,983	44,274	24,366
Percentage	46.5%	33.8%	18.6%
Swing	▲11.6%	▼11.8%	▼0.7%
Control before election
Labour
Control after election
Conservative

The 1976 Luton Borough Council election took place on 6 May 1976 to elect members of Luton Borough Council in Bedfordshire, England. This was on the same day as other local elections.

== Summary ==
=== Election result ===
1976 Luton Borough Council election
Party	Candidates	Seats	Gains	Losses	Net gain/loss	Seats %	Votes %	Votes	+/−
Conservative	48	37	N/A	N/A	▲25	77.1	46.5	60,983	+11.6
Labour	48	10	N/A	N/A	▼20	20.8	33.8	44,274	–11.8
Liberal	48	1	N/A	N/A	▼5	2.1	18.6	24,366	–0.7
Independent	6	0	N/A	N/A	Steady	0.0	0.7	896	N/A
Communist	4	0	N/A	N/A	Steady	0.0	0.2	321	±0.0
National Front	1	0	N/A	N/A	Steady	0.0	0.2	213	N/A

== Ward results ==
Incumbent councillors standing for re-election are marked with an asterisk (*). Changes in seats do not take into account by-elections or defections.

=== Biscot ===
Biscot
Party	Candidate	Votes	%
Conservative	G. Hickinbottom	1,507	54.3
Conservative	M. Langlois	1,414	50.9
Conservative	K. Woodbridge	1,349	48.6
Labour	S. Debgupta	742	26.7
Labour	J. Adams	716	25.8
Labour	H. Ruis	634	22.8
Liberal	M. Norton	296	10.7
Liberal	P. Hatswell	294	10.6
Liberal	S. Norton	273	9.8
Independent	J. Bard	128	4.6
Turnout		~2,776	38.4
Registered electors		7,230	
Conservative win (new seat)			
Conservative win (new seat)			
Conservative win (new seat)			

=== Bramingham ===
Bramingham (3 seats)
Party	Candidate	Votes	%
Conservative	P. Glenister	812	51.8
Conservative	F. Lester	794	50.7
Conservative	L. Pane	768	49.0
Labour	J. McGrath	332	21.2
Liberal	D. Larkman	323	20.6
Labour	W. Nixon	311	19.8
Labour	M. Carr	309	19.7
Liberal	P. Larkman	283	18.1
Liberal	D. De Groot	272	17.4
Independent	H. Durie	154	9.8
Turnout		~1,567	50.5
Registered electors		3,103	
Conservative win (new seat)			
Conservative win (new seat)			
Conservative win (new seat)			

=== Challney ===
Challney (3 seats)
Party	Candidate	Votes	%
Conservative	G. Boote	1,634	52.2
Conservative	E. Dodd	1,628	52.0
Conservative	M. McCarroll	1,564	49.9
Labour	P. Moore	808	25.8
Labour	V. Kennedy	770	24.6
Labour	M. Taylor	746	23.8
Liberal	L. Cooke	373	11.9
Liberal	C. Gray	299	9.5
Liberal	J. Gannon	290	9.3
Turnout		~3,132	39.4
Registered electors		7,948	
Conservative win (new seat)			
Conservative win (new seat)			
Conservative win (new seat)			

=== Crawley ===
Crawley (3 seats)
Party	Candidate	Votes	%
Conservative	K. Connolly	1,428	41.7
Conservative	R. Dean	1,391	40.7
Conservative	J. Lucas	1,385	40.5
Labour	C. Jephson	1,067	31.2
Labour	E. Dimmock	1,052	30.7
Labour	J. Carleton	1,034	30.2
Liberal	T. Keens	670	19.6
Liberal	W. Cross	576	16.8
Liberal	M. McNally	575	16.8
Communist	T. Mitchell	58	1.7
Turnout		~3,422	46.3
Registered electors		7,390	
Conservative win (new boundaries)			
Conservative win (new boundaries)			
Conservative win (new boundaries)			

=== Dallow ===
Dallow (3 seats)
Party	Candidate	Votes	%
Labour	E. Scanlan	1,128	41.5
Labour	D. Fuller	1,099	40.5
Conservative	R. Dudley	1,081	39.8
Labour	J. Wilson	1,048	38.6
Conservative	J. Garvey	948	34.9
Conservative	J. Heredia	910	33.5
Liberal	K. Channing	313	11.5
Liberal	C. Scott	277	10.2
Liberal	G. Channing	257	9.5
Turnout		~2,715	36.8
Registered electors		7,379	
Labour win (new boundaries)			
Labour win (new boundaries)			
Conservative win (new boundaries)			

=== Farley ===
Farley (3 seats)
Party	Candidate	Votes	%
Labour	T. Kenneally	1,567	55.3
Labour	T. Jenkins	1,522	53.7
Labour	W. McKenzie	1,443	50.9
Conservative	H. Hampshire	764	27.0
Conservative	J. Clay	689	24.3
Conservative	L. Wooldridge	664	23.4
Liberal	V. Perryman	250	8.8
Liberal	J. Weber	213	7.5
National Front	L. Nunn	213	7.5
Liberal	T. Sharman	195	6.9
Communist	Z. Moran	59	2.1
Turnout		~2,833	38.1
Registered electors		7,435	
Labour win (new seat)			
Labour win (new seat)			
Labour win (new seat)			

=== High Town ===
High Town (3 seats)
Party	Candidate	Votes	%
Conservative	C. Everard	1,175	43.2
Conservative	A. Flint	1,169	43.0
Conservative	M. Hunter	1,100	40.4
Labour	H. Heather	834	30.7
Labour	S. Gonshor	811	29.8
Labour	W. Pratt	699	25.7
Liberal	J. Fensome	668	24.6
Liberal	W. Cross	515	18.9
Liberal	L. Gresham	482	17.7
Communist	E. Johnson	106	3.9
Turnout		~2,720	40.2
Registered electors		6,767	
Conservative win (new boundaries)			
Conservative win (new boundaries)			
Conservative win (new boundaries)			

=== Icknield ===
Icknield (3 seats)
Party	Candidate	Votes	%
Conservative	V. Dunington	2,345	72.6
Conservative	R. Cartwright	2,285	70.7
Conservative	D. Johnston	2,210	68.4
Labour	L. Randall	565	17.5
Labour	E. Lurkings	564	17.5
Labour	J. Thorpe	499	15.4
Liberal	C. Cocks	302	9.3
Liberal	E. Jenner	250	7.7
Liberal	G. Thanki	176	5.4
Turnout		~3,231	48.2
Registered electors		6,704	
Conservative win (new boundaries)			
Conservative win (new boundaries)			
Conservative win (new boundaries)			

=== Leagrave ===
Leagrave (3 seats)
Party	Candidate	Votes	%
Conservative	M. Garrett	1,365	40.0
Conservative	J. Goldsmith	1,289	37.8
Conservative	P. Locke	1,254	36.7
Labour	M. Fraser	1,102	32.3
Labour	B. Woolner	1,026	30.1
Labour	R. Sills	967	28.3
Liberal	M. Dolling	905	26.5
Liberal	C. Mead	778	22.8
Liberal	M. Robinson	757	22.2
Turnout		~3,413	44.8
Registered electors		7,618	
Conservative win (new boundaries)			
Conservative win (new boundaries)			
Conservative win (new boundaries)			

=== Lewsey ===
Lewsey (3 seats)
Party	Candidate	Votes	%
Labour	D. Kennedy	1,155	50.5
Labour	C. Lidyard	1,082	47.3
Labour	P. Hopkins	1,039	45.5
Conservative	C. Priede	669	29.3
Conservative	J. Giles	668	29.2
Conservative	A. Hyett	664	29.1
Liberal	G. Dadd	315	13.8
Liberal	A. Brazier	313	13.7
Liberal	R. Guinnane	270	11.8
Turnout		~2,285	32.1
Registered electors		7,119	
Labour win (new boundaries)			
Labour win (new boundaries)			
Labour win (new boundaries)			

=== Limbury ===
Limbury (3 seats)
Party	Candidate	Votes	%
Conservative	G. Payne	1,505	46.7
Conservative	S. Tucker	1,438	44.6
Conservative	J. Syms	1,423	44.2
Labour	W. Holes	1,277	39.6
Labour	J. Johnson	1,258	39.0
Labour	C. Lewis	1,160	36.0
Liberal	G. Flynn	292	9.1
Liberal	A. Doris	277	8.6
Liberal	G. Hotard	277	8.6
Turnout		~3,223	44.5
Registered electors		7,242	
Conservative win (new boundaries)			
Conservative win (new boundaries)			
Conservative win (new boundaries)			

=== Putteridge ===
Putteridge (3 seats)
Party	Candidate	Votes	%
Conservative	D. Curd	1,356	38.9
Conservative	S. Webster	1,311	37.6
Conservative	I. Holes	1,306	37.5
Labour	F. Courty	1,032	29.6
Labour	W. Edwards	1,019	29.3
Labour	A. Page	951	27.3
Liberal	F. Shillingford	911	26.2
Liberal	H. Perryman	863	24.8
Liberal	J. Farrent	858	24.6
Turnout		~3,482	50.3
Registered electors		6,923	
Conservative win (new seat)			
Conservative win (new seat)			
Conservative win (new seat)			

=== Saints ===
Saints (3 seats)
Party	Candidate	Votes	%
Conservative	W. Copeland	1,745	49.3
Conservative	G. Pearson	1,676	47.4
Conservative	P. Wolsey	1,588	44.9
Liberal	D. Franks	766	21.6
Labour	E. Moran	761	21.5
Labour	J. Bailey	755	21.3
Labour	M. Guha	734	20.7
Liberal	A. Farrow	716	20.2
Liberal	D. Stott	641	18.1
Independent	J. Gooding	172	4.9
Independent	R. Bull	154	4.4
Independent	M. Reid	112	3.2
Turnout		~3,539	47.4
Registered electors		7,466	
Conservative win (new seat)			
Conservative win (new seat)			
Conservative win (new seat)			

=== South ===
South (3 seats)
Party	Candidate	Votes	%
Conservative	K. Furlong	1,373	48.4
Conservative	L. Benson	1,295	45.6
Conservative	K. Janes	1,279	45.1
Labour	J. Fox	925	32.6
Labour	R. Jeffries	891	31.4
Labour	J. Thakoordin	706	24.9
Liberal	J. Davies	357	12.6
Liberal	A. Perryman	354	12.5
Liberal	G. Richardson	316	11.1
Independent	L. Byrne	176	6.2
Communist	T. May	98	3.5
Turnout		~2,838	36.0
Registered electors		7,883	
Conservative win (new boundaries)			
Conservative win (new boundaries)			
Conservative win (new boundaries)			

=== Stopsley ===
Stopsley (3 seats)
Party	Candidate	Votes	%
Conservative	G. Dillingham	1,607	45.5
Conservative	A. Lucas	1,526	43.2
Conservative	G. Davies	1,489	42.2
Liberal	R. Davies	919	26.0
Labour	D. Grayson	882	25.0
Labour	J. Courty	880	24.9
Labour	H. Robertson	874	24.8
Liberal	H. Roe	777	22.0
Liberal	D. Wood	774	21.9
Turnout		~3,531	49.1
Registered electors		7,192	
Conservative win (new boundaries)			
Conservative win (new boundaries)			
Conservative win (new boundaries)			

=== Sundon Park ===
Sundon Park (3 seats)
Party	Candidate	Votes	%
Labour	J. Cussen	1,297	38.9
Liberal	C. Hinkley	1,235	37.0
Labour	E. Haldane	1,180	35.4
Liberal	D. Hinkley	1,161	34.8
Liberal	J. James	1,112	33.3
Labour	A. Speakman	1,021	30.6
Conservative	M. Edwards	813	24.4
Conservative	R. Samuels	667	20.0
Conservative	F. Haughey	663	19.9
Turnout		~3,337	44.9
Registered electors		7,431	
Labour win (new boundaries)			
Liberal win (new boundaries)			
Labour win (new boundaries)			
