= 2011 Luton Borough Council election =

2011 UK local government election

- 5 May 2011

All 48 seats to Luton Borough Council 25 seats needed for a majority

	First party	Second party	Third party
Leader	Hazel Simmons	David Franks
Party	Labour	Liberal Democrats	Conservative
Seats won	36	8	4
Seat change	▲10	▼9	▼1
Popular vote	61,315	30,283	30,808
Percentage	48.7%	24.0%	24.4%
Swing	▲10.7%	▼7.9%	▲1.2%
Control before election
Labour
Control after election
Labour

The 2011 Luton Borough Council election took place on 5 May 2011 to elect members of Luton Borough Council in Bedfordshire, England.

The Labour Party strengthened its control of the council, mainly at the expense of the Liberal Democrats, winning three-quarters of the seats. The Liberal Democrats were marginally outvoted by the Conservatives, but won twice as many seats, probably due to not putting up candidates for all available seats (only Labour and the Conservatives had the maximum number of candidates).

== Summary ==
=== Election result ===
2011 Luton Borough Council election
Party	Candidates	Seats	Gains	Losses	Net gain/loss	Seats %	Votes %	Votes	+/−
Labour	48	36	10	0	▲10	75.0	48.7	61,315	+10.7
Liberal Democrats	41	8	0	9	▼9	16.7	24.0	30,283	–7.9
Conservative	48	4	0	1	▼1	8.3	24.4	30,808	+1.2
Independent	3	0	0	0	Steady	0.0	0.9	1,092	–0.3
Green	6	0	0	0	Steady	0.0	0.8	1,068	–0.4
UKIP	4	0	0	0	Steady	0.0	0.8	984	–0.2
BNP	1	0	0	0	Steady	0.0	0.2	250	–0.6
Respect	1	0	0	0	Steady	0.0	0.2	209	–2.2

== Ward results ==
Incumbent councillors standing for re-election are marked with an asterisk (*). Changes in seats do not take into account by-elections or defections.

=== Barnfield ===
Barnfield (2 seats)
Party	Candidate	Votes	%	±%
Liberal Democrats	Martin Pantling*	904	35.0	–7.7
Labour	Rachel Hopkins	822	31.8	+20.4
Liberal Democrats	Andrew Strange	808	31.3	–10.4
Conservative	Graham Costello	691	26.7	+0.3
Labour	Bryan Davey	679	26.3	+15.6
Conservative	Saeed Akhtar	657	25.4	±0.0
Green	Simon Hall	171	6.6	+1.7
Turnout		~2,584	46.6	+0.7
Registered electors		5,544		
Liberal Democrats hold				
Labour gain from Liberal Democrats				

=== Biscot ===
Biscot (3 seats)
Party	Candidate	Votes	%	±%
Labour	Tahir Khan*	2,262	49.4	+12.4
Labour	Mohammed Ayub*	2,082	45.5	+11.3
Labour	Naseem Ayub	2,042	44.6	+13.0
Liberal Democrats	Ashuk Ahmed	1,581	34.5	+2.7
Liberal Democrats	Haji Abid	1,271	27.8	–3.7
Liberal Democrats	Mohammed Bashir	1,154	25.2	–3.6
Conservative	Abu Ahmed	587	12.8	–6.0
Conservative	Arthur Flint	348	7.6	–1.8
Conservative	Jamshed Ali	293	6.4	N/A
Respect	Faruk Choudhury	209	4.6	–12.1
Independent	Mohammed-Forid Ahmed-Chowdhury	164	3.6	N/A
Turnout		~4,577	50.2	+7.1
Registered electors		9,118		
Labour hold				
Labour hold				
Labour gain from Liberal Democrats				

=== Bramingham ===
Bramingham (2 seats)
Party	Candidate	Votes	%	±%
Conservative	Gilbert Campbell*	1,325	54.5	–8.5
Conservative	Katherine Foord*	1,284	52.8	–9.8
Labour	Gregory Burton	898	36.9	+13.9
Labour	Syedul Khan	576	23.7	+1.5
Liberal Democrats	Joyce Felmingham	204	8.4	–3.5
Liberal Democrats	Giovanni Testagrossa	103	4.2	–5.9
Turnout		~2,432	42.4	+8.9
Registered electors		5,736		
Conservative hold				
Conservative hold				

=== Challney ===
Challney (3 seats)
Party	Candidate	Votes	%	±%
Labour	Thomas Shaw*	1,899	55.4	+19.0
Labour	Khtija Malik*	1,499	43.8	+8.0
Labour	Tahir Malik	1,470	42.9	+10.4
Liberal Democrats	Sirfraz Ali-Choudhry	1,060	31.0	–8.4
Liberal Democrats	Julia Mead	1,057	30.9	–7.3
Liberal Democrats	Mohammed Yasin	841	24.6	–9.4
Conservative	Naeem Khan	397	11.6	–6.0
Conservative	Ismail Ali	396	11.6	–5.4
Conservative	Bashir Hafeez	391	11.4	–3.1
Turnout		~3,425	43.8	+5.5
Registered electors		8,765		
Labour hold				
Labour gain from Liberal Democrats				
Labour gain from Liberal Democrats				

=== Crawley ===
Crawley (2 seats)
Party	Candidate	Votes	%	±%
Labour	Melvin Cato	837	39.0	+13.8
Liberal Democrats	David Franks*	797	37.1	–26.3
Labour	Philomena Kean	736	34.3	+17.3
Liberal Democrats	Clive Mead	575	26.8	–27.3
Conservative	Alan Hamilton	550	25.6	N/A
Conservative	Anwar Hussain	442	20.6	N/A
Turnout		~2,149	42.3	+8.7
Registered electors		5,080		
Labour gain from Liberal Democrats				
Liberal Democrats hold				

=== Dallow ===
Dallow (3 seats)
Party	Candidate	Votes	%	±%
Labour	Mohammed Ashraf*	1,984	42.3	+5.8
Labour	Tafheen Sharif	1,914	40.8	+9.5
Labour	Mohammed Farooq*	1,870	39.9	+12.1
Liberal Democrats	Naseem Arif	1,319	28.1	+4.3
Liberal Democrats	Sadiq Subhani	1,181	25.2	+2.2
Liberal Democrats	Asif Masood	1,105	23.6	+1.2
Independent	Mohammed Khan	678	14.5	N/A
Conservative	Mohammed Choudhury	677	14.4	+2.0
Conservative	Mohammed Islam	378	8.1	–1.7
Conservative	Shyamal Roy	341	7.3	–2.3
Turnout		~4,688	48.5	+8.8
Registered electors		9,666		
Labour hold				
Labour hold				
Labour hold				

=== Farley ===
Farley (3 seats)
Party	Candidate	Votes	%	±%
Labour	Robin Harris*	1,549	55.4	+1.8
Labour	Sian Tomoney*	1,518	54.3	+1.4
Labour	Mahmood Hussain	1,496	53.5	+1.9
Conservative	Kevin Drew	508	18.2	+0.6
Conservative	John Sentinella	420	15.0	–1.5
Conservative	Samson Victor	409	14.6	+1.7
Liberal Democrats	Mohammed Choudary	294	10.5	+2.8
BNP	Stephen Bridgeman	250	8.9	–4.5
Liberal Democrats	Allah Ditta	229	8.2	+1.8
UKIP	Charles Lawman	218	7.8	+1.4
Liberal Democrats	Soirab Taj	187	6.7	+1.1
Turnout		~2,797	37.5	+3.5
Registered electors		7,458		
Labour hold				
Labour hold				
Labour hold				

=== High Town ===
High Town (2 seats)
Party	Candidate	Votes	%	±%
Labour	Andrew Malcolm	1,008	54.3	+14.9
Labour	Roxanna Whittaker	899	48.4	+12.2
Conservative	David Coulter	491	26.4	–8.3
Conservative	Meherban Khan	437	23.5	–9.5
Green	Denis Parker	191	10.3	–4.3
Liberal Democrats	Barry Neale*	176	9.5	–1.9
Liberal Democrats	Lawrence Patterson*	126	6.8	–4.4
Turnout		~1,858	34.3	+4.6
Registered electors		5,417		
Labour hold				
Labour hold				

=== Icknield ===
Icknield (2 seats)
Party	Candidate	Votes	%	±%
Conservative	Michael Garrett*	1,325	50.7	–11.6
Conservative	John Titmuss*	1,226	46.9	–13.0
Labour	Alan Roden	930	35.6	+15.9
Labour	Irak-Il Chowdhury	856	32.8	+20.8
Liberal Democrats	Yvonne Edwards	245	9.4	–8.0
Liberal Democrats	Michael Lincoln	172	6.6	–8.4
Turnout		~2,613	44.7	+7.4
Registered electors		5,846		
Conservative hold				
Conservative hold				

=== Leagrave ===
Leagrave (3 seats)
Party	Candidate	Votes	%	±%
Labour	Sheila Roden*	1,399	66.2	+16.8
Labour	Desline Stewart*	1,364	64.6	+16.0
Labour	Waheed Akbar*	1,299	61.5	+14.5
Conservative	Richard Joyce	822	38.9	+4.0
Conservative	Ifhekher Alom	781	37.0	+3.6
Conservative	Bunmi Adedeji	674	31.9	+0.1
Turnout		~2,113	36.5	+2.7
Registered electors		8,038		
Labour hold				
Labour hold				
Labour hold				

=== Lewsey ===
Lewsey (3 seats)
Party	Candidate	Votes	%	±%
Labour	Joan Bailey*	1,798	61.6	+11.1
Labour	Hazel Simmons*	1,708	58.6	+10.3
Labour	Mohammed Khan	1,456	49.9	+4.7
Conservative	Susan Garrett	774	26.5	+3.5
Conservative	Jeffrey Petts	616	21.1	+4.3
Conservative	Robert Theobald	602	20.6	+3.9
Green	Eileen Nash	287	9.8	–0.1
Liberal Democrats	Salma Nasir	206	7.1	–9.2
Turnout		~2,917	33.7	+5.2
Registered electors		8,656		
Labour hold				
Labour hold				
Labour hold				

=== Limbury ===
Limbury (2 seats)
Party	Candidate	Votes	%	±%
Labour	Stephen Lewis	1,245	48.7	+11.3
Labour	Jacqueline Burnett*	1,226	47.9	+12.3
Conservative	Robert Simons	965	37.7	+0.9
Conservative	Margaret Simons*	908	35.5	+5.6
UKIP	Colin Brown	246	9.6	+0.3
Turnout		~2,557	44.8	+4.9
Registered electors		5,708		
Labour gain from Conservative				
Labour hold				

=== Northwell ===
Northwell (2 seats)
Party	Candidate	Votes	%	±%
Labour	Roy Davis*	1,053	58.4	+10.9
Labour	Don Worlding*	1,027	57.0	+13.6
Conservative	Deloris Campbell	395	21.9	–4.3
Conservative	Nuala Prior	301	16.7	–6.8
Independent	Victor Cowell	250	13.9	N/A
Liberal Democrats	Brian Richardson	123	6.8	–13.1
Liberal Democrats	Aroosa Ulzaman	76	4.2	–10.2
Turnout		~1,802	33.0	+6.2
Registered electors		5,460		
Labour hold				
Labour hold				

=== Round Green ===
Round Green (3 seats)
Party	Candidate	Votes	%	±%
Labour	Mark Rivers	1,228	38.6	+13.2
Labour	Yaqub Hanif	1,061	33.3	+9.9
Labour	Mohammed Zia	991	31.1	+9.0
Liberal Democrats	Alan Skepelhorn*	960	30.1	–21.9
Liberal Democrats	Terry Keens	933	29.3	–17.4
Conservative	Richard Ellwood	893	28.0	+8.9
Liberal Democrats	Sidney Rutstein*	877	27.5	–18.1
Conservative	Jayne Stewart	812	25.5	N/A
Conservative	Philip Turner	790	24.8	N/A
Turnout		~3,185	40.2	+3.9
Registered electors		7,922		
Labour gain from Liberal Democrats				
Labour gain from Liberal Democrats				
Labour gain from Liberal Democrats				

=== Saints ===
Saints (3 seats)
Party	Candidate	Votes	%	±%
Labour	Mohammed Riaz*	2,240	51.1	+1.1
Labour	Raja Saleem*	2,119	48.4	±0.0
Labour	Asma Rathore	2,023	46.2	+0.2
Liberal Democrats	Muhammad Yasin	1,318	30.1	+4.5
Liberal Democrats	Masood Akhtar	1,230	28.1	+7.2
Liberal Democrats	Imtiaz Nasreen	832	19.0	–1.4
Conservative	Abdul Rashid	686	15.7	–7.3
Conservative	Arif Mohammed	604	13.8	–5.2
Conservative	Morel Bernard*	596	13.6	–1.0
Turnout		~4,381	47.8	+5.7
Registered electors		9,166		
Labour hold				
Labour hold				
Labour hold				

=== South ===
South (3 seats)
Party	Candidate	Votes	%	±%
Labour	Amy O'Callaghan	994	48.0	+3.0
Labour	Keir Gale	957	46.2	+6.9
Labour	David Taylor*	930	44.9	+9.7
Conservative	Peter Banks	653	31.5	–1.6
Conservative	John Young	528	25.5	–7.2
Conservative	Ali Aklakul	518	25.0	+1.1
UKIP	Martin Newman	196	9.5	N/A
Green	Lyn Bliss	161	7.8	–6.4
Green	Marc Scheimann	150	7.2	N/A
Liberal Democrats	Martin Howes	149	7.2	–6.1
Liberal Democrats	William Cole	142	6.9	–4.9
Liberal Democrats	Anjum Choudary	114	5.5	–3.2
Green	Eric Fisher	108	5.2	N/A
Turnout		6,809	30.4	+5.8
Registered electors				
Labour hold				
Labour hold				
Labour hold				

=== Stopsley ===
Stopsley (2 seats)
Party	Candidate	Votes	%	±%
Liberal Democrats	Jennifer Davies*	1,201	47.7	–13.7
Liberal Democrats	Michael Dolling*	991	39.4	–17.9
Conservative	Richard Lovelock	730	29.0	+6.9
Conservative	Peter Bushnell	639	25.4	+3.3
Labour	James Carroll	578	23.0	+8.4
Labour	Pardeep Kumar	476	18.9	+5.0
Turnout		~2,516	46.2	+2.8
Registered electors		5,446		
Liberal Democrats hold				
Liberal Democrats hold				

=== Sundon Park ===
Sundon Park (2 seats)
Party	Candidate	Votes	%	±%
Labour	Sydney Knight	1,099	42.3	+13.6
Liberal Democrats	Doris Hinkley*	1,097	42.3	–14.0
Labour	Summara Shahid	917	35.3	+11.3
Liberal Democrats	Anna Perdersen*	890	34.3	–15.5
Conservative	Ian Beck	460	17.7	+3.0
Conservative	Saleha Parveen	335	12.9	–0.3
Turnout		~2,595	46.0	+6.1
Registered electors		5,642		
Labour gain from Liberal Democrats				
Liberal Democrats hold				

=== Wigmore ===
Wigmore (3 seats)
Party	Candidate	Votes	%	±%
Liberal Democrats	Royston Davies*	1,403	42.4	–17.0
Liberal Democrats	Peter Chapman*	1,239	37.4	–17.7
Liberal Democrats	Diane Moles	1,113	33.6	–15.9
Conservative	Mary Thomas	807	24.4	+3.0
Conservative	Nicodemus Mawerere	787	23.8	+2.6
Labour	Peter Blanking	786	23.7	+8.7
Labour	Richard Jack	781	23.6	+9.3
Labour	Norris Bullock*	734	22.2	+8.9
Conservative	Afiz Ullah	559	16.9	N/A
UKIP	Lance Richardson	324	9.8	–1.5
Turnout		~3,313	39.3	+5.3
Registered electors		8,429		
Liberal Democrats hold				
Liberal Democrats hold				
Liberal Democrats hold				
