= 2007 Luton Borough Council election =

Local election in England

- 3 May 2007

All 48 seats to Luton Borough Council 25 seats needed for a majority

	First party	Second party
Party	Labour	Liberal Democrats
Seats won	26	17
Seat change	▲3	▼3
Popular vote	43,648	36,737
Percentage	38.0%	31.9%
Swing	▲3.0%	▼6.0%
	Third party	Fourth party
Party	Conservative	Independent
Seats won	5	0
Seat change	▲1	▼1
Popular vote	26,645	1,437
Percentage	23.2%	1.2%
Swing	▲0.8%	▼3.0%
Control before election
No overall control
Control after election
Labour

The 2007 Luton Borough Council election took place on 3 May 2007 to elect members of Luton Borough Council in Bedfordshire, England. This was on the same day as other local elections.

== Summary ==
=== Election result ===
2007 Luton Borough Council election
Party	Candidates	Seats	Gains	Losses	Net gain/loss	Seats %	Votes %	Votes	+/−
Labour	48	26	4	1	▲3	54.2	38.0	43,648	+3.0
Liberal Democrats	48	17	0	3	▼3	35.4	31.9	36,737	–6.0
Conservative	42	5	1	0	▲1	10.4	23.2	26,645	+0.8
Respect	4	0	0	0	Steady	0.0	2.4	2,786	N/A
Independent	2	0	0	1	▼1	0.0	1.2	1,437	–3.0
Green	7	0	0	0	Steady	0.0	1.2	1,359	+1.0
UKIP	6	0	0	0	Steady	0.0	1.0	1,156	+0.7
BNP	2	0	0	0	Steady	0.0	0.8	890	N/A
English Democrat	1	0	0	0	Steady	0.0	0.2	263	N/A
Vote Liberty	2	0	0	0	Steady	0.0	0.1	80	N/A

== Ward results ==
Incumbent councillors standing for re-election are marked with an asterisk (*). Changes in seats do not take into account by-elections or defections.

=== Barnfield ===
Barnfield (2 seats)
Party	Candidate	Votes	%	±%
Liberal Democrats	Barry Neale	1,074	42.7	–12.3
Liberal Democrats	Martin Pantling*	1,050	41.7	–7.1
Conservative	John Young	665	26.4	–12.0
Conservative	Sean Connley	639	25.4	–8.4
Independent	Andrew Cook	501	19.9	N/A
Labour	Peter Campbell	288	11.4	–4.3
Labour	Bryan Davey	269	10.7	–3.7
UKIP	Judy King	137	5.4	N/A
Green	Simon Hall	124	4.9	N/A
Turnout		~2,518	45.9	+12.1
Registered electors		5,486		
Liberal Democrats hold				
Liberal Democrats hold				

=== Biscot ===
Biscot (3 seats)
Party	Candidate	Votes	%	±%
Labour	Tahir Khan	1,479	37.0	+4.7
Labour	Mohammad Ayub	1,370	34.2	+4.3
Liberal Democrats	Qurban Hussain*	1,273	31.8	–16.5
Labour	Akbar Khan	1,266	31.6	+2.4
Liberal Democrats	Haji Abid*	1,262	31.5	–16.1
Liberal Democrats	Masood Akhtar	1,152	28.8	–15.8
Conservative	Ali Islam	753	18.8	+6.8
Respect	Mobeen Qureshi	667	16.7	N/A
Respect	Stephen Coghlan	621	15.5	N/A
Conservative	Mohammed Ijaz	377	9.4	–1.0
Turnout		~4,002	43.1	+6.8
Registered electors		9,286		
Labour gain from Liberal Democrats				
Labour gain from Liberal Democrats				
Liberal Democrats hold				

=== Bramingham ===
Bramingham (2 seats)
Party	Candidate	Votes	%	±%
Conservative	Gilbert Campbell*	1,130	63.0	+10.1
Conservative	Katie Foord	1,124	62.6	+9.9
Labour	Peter Blanking	412	23.0	–4.9
Labour	Greg Burton	398	22.2	–3.6
Liberal Democrats	Michael Lincoln	213	11.9	–5.1
Liberal Democrats	Brenda Siederer	181	10.1	–5.9
Green	Jean Parker	128	7.1	N/A
Turnout		~1,795	33.5	+7.1
Registered electors		5,357		
Conservative hold				
Conservative hold				

=== Challney ===
Challney (3 seats)
Party	Candidate	Votes	%	±%
Liberal Democrats	Colin Mead*	1,348	39.4	–4.8
Liberal Democrats	Anne Strange*	1,309	38.2	–4.6
Labour	Kamal Mallik	1,245	36.4	+8.7
Labour	Akbar Khan	1,227	35.8	+9.8
Liberal Democrats	Mohammad Yasin	1,163	34.0	–7.7
Labour	Afsar Roden	1,114	32.5	+8.9
Conservative	Mark Punter	603	17.6	–2.0
Conservative	Victor Samson	582	17.0	–2.0
Conservative	Bashir Hafeez	498	14.5	–4.2
Turnout		~3,425	38.3	+6.0
Registered electors		8,942		
Liberal Democrats hold				
Liberal Democrats hold				
Labour gain from Liberal Democrats				

=== Crawley ===
Crawley (2 seats)
Party	Candidate	Votes	%	±%
Liberal Democrats	David Franks*	1,137	63.4	–5.2
Liberal Democrats	Lawrence Patterson*	969	54.1	–10.2
Labour	Wendy Armstrong	452	25.2	+6.3
Labour	Tahir Malik	305	17.0	+1.8
Green	Denis Parker	247	13.8	N/A
Turnout		~1,793	33.6	+4.7
Registered electors		5,335		
Liberal Democrats hold				
Liberal Democrats hold				

=== Dallow ===
Dallow (3 seats)
Party	Candidate	Votes	%	±%
Labour	Mohammed Ashraf*	1,448	36.5	+1.3
Labour	Mohammed Farooq*	1,244	31.3	+2.4
Labour	Abdur Raquib	1,106	27.8	+1.8
Liberal Democrats	Ashuk Ahmed	946	23.8	–1.3
Independent	Bashir Mohammed*	936	23.6	–7.0
Liberal Democrats	Asif Masood	912	23.0	+0.8
Liberal Democrats	Munir Khan	890	22.4	+4.1
Respect	Tahir Raza	820	17.1	N/A
Respect	Lesley Smith	678	12.4	N/A
Conservative	Mohammed Choudhury	493	12.4	+2.6
Conservative	Jamshed Ali	388	9.8	+0.5
Conservative	Nasreen Imtiaz	381	9.6	+1.2
Turnout		~3,972	39.7	+8.0
Registered electors		10,004		
Labour hold				
Labour hold				
Labour gain from Independent				

=== Farley ===
Farley (3 seats)
Party	Candidate	Votes	%	±%
Labour	Robin Harris	1,429	53.6	–3.2
Labour	Sian Timoney	1,412	52.9	–3.5
Labour	Mahmood Hussain*	1,378	51.6	–2.9
Conservative	Kevin Drew	469	17.6	–1.7
Conservative	Rex Catlin	439	16.5	–1.1
BNP	Robert Sheddock	357	13.4	N/A
Conservative	John Sentinella	345	12.9	–4.5
Green	Tracy Finlan	235	8.8	N/A
Liberal Democrats	Joyce Felmingham	205	7.7	–8.3
UKIP	Frank Herlock	182	6.4	+2.1
Liberal Democrats	Anne Mead	170	6.4	–8.1
UKIP	Charles Lawman	158	5.9	+2.1
Liberal Democrats	Hasmita Soni	150	5.6	–7.0
Turnout		~2,668	34.0	+9.2
Registered electors		7,847		
Labour hold				
Labour hold				
Labour hold				

=== High Town ===
High Town (2 seats)
Party	Candidate	Votes	%	±%
Labour	Jacqui Burnett	672	39.4	–4.0
Labour	Lakhbir Singh*	617	36.2	+2.9
Conservative	Meherban Khan	592	34.7	+3.7
Conservative	Nicholas Morgan	563	33.0	+2.1
Green	Melanie Parker	248	14.6	+2.9
Liberal Democrats	Ruth Fisher	195	11.4	–2.4
Liberal Democrats	Bill Cole	191	11.2	+1.2
Turnout		~1,704	29.7	+3.3
Registered electors		5,737		
Labour hold				
Labour hold				

=== Icknield ===
Icknield (2 seats)
Party	Candidate	Votes	%	±%
Conservative	Michael Garrett*	1,383	62.3	+5.7
Conservative	John Titmuss*	1,328	59.9	+5.0
Labour	Rachel Hopkins	437	19.7	–7.0
Liberal Democrats	David Chapman	385	17.4	+3.5
Liberal Democrats	Yvonne Edmunds	332	15.0	+1.9
Labour	Malik Ditta	267	12.0	–14.0
Turnout		~2,219	37.3	+7.8
Registered electors		5,948		
Conservative hold				
Conservative hold				

=== Leagrave ===
Leagrave (3 seats)
Party	Candidate	Votes	%	±%
Labour	Sheila Roden*	1,401	49.4	+5.3
Labour	Desline Stewart*	1,381	48.6	+9.5
Labour	Waheed Akbar	1,333	47.0	+8.6
Conservative	Dean Fryer-Saxby	992	34.9	+1.8
Conservative	Polly Fryer-Saxby	949	33.4	+0.7
Conservative	John Heredia	904	31.8	+1.6
Liberal Democrats	Tony Farrow	310	10.9	–8.7
Liberal Democrats	Edwin Hird	273	9.6	–9.1
Liberal Democrats	Brian Richardson	267	9.4	–6.8
Turnout		~2,839	33.8	+12.1
Registered electors		8,399		
Labour hold				
Labour hold				
Labour hold				

=== Lewsey ===
Lewsey (3 seats)
Party	Candidate	Votes	%	±%
Labour	Tom Shaw*	1,287	50.5	–1.7
Labour	Joan Bailey*	1,231	48.3	–2.4
Labour	Hazel Simmons*	1,152	45.2	–2.3
Conservative	Alan Hamilton	586	23.0	–0.9
Conservative	Simidele Adedeji	428	16.8	–5.3
Conservative	Kaj Debnath	426	16.7	–4.8
Liberal Democrats	Allan Mwango	415	16.3	–3.1
Liberal Democrats	Moazzem Hussain	374	14.7	–2.2
Liberal Democrats	Ghazala Khan	336	13.2	–3.4
Green	David Nash	253	9.9	N/A
Turnout		~2,547	28.5	+6.6
Registered electors		8,936		
Labour hold				
Labour hold				
Labour hold				

=== Limbury ===
Limbury (2 seats)
Party	Candidate	Votes	%	±%
Labour	Norris Bullock*	859	37.4	–4.0
Conservative	Margaret Simons	844	36.8	+0.4
Labour	Klazina Coleman	816	35.6	–2.6
Conservative	Wan Jan	687	29.9	–3.2
English Democrat	Nick Capp	263	11.5	N/A
UKIP	Colin Brown	214	9.3	N/A
Liberal Democrats	John Roberts	176	7.7	–3.8
Liberal Democrats	Sharon Virgo	143	6.2	–5.3
UKIP	Stephen Wildman	138	6.0	N/A
Green	Malcolm Bailey	124	5.4	N/A
Turnout		~2,294	39.9	+9.5
Registered electors		5,749		
Labour hold				
Conservative gain from Labour				

=== Northwell ===
Northwell (2 seats)
Party	Candidate	Votes	%	±%
Labour	Roy Davis	745	47.5	–3.8
Labour	Don Worlding	680	43.4	–2.0
Conservative	David Duckwork	411	26.2	+5.3
Conservative	Babtunde Akinfisoye	369	23.5	+3.8
Liberal Democrats	Farid Ahmed	312	19.9	+3.1
Liberal Democrats	Mohammed Zia	226	14.4	–0.8
Vote Liberty	Eileen Mahrra	50	3.2	N/A
Vote Liberty	Reginder Mahrra	30	1.9	–4.3
Turnout		~1,567	26.8	+8.8
Registered electors		5,847		
Labour hold				
Labour hold				

=== Round Green ===
Round Green (3 seats)
Party	Candidate	Votes	%	±%
Liberal Democrats	Alan Skelpelhorn*	1,550	52.0	–1.7
Liberal Democrats	Sid Rutstein	1,393	46.7	–5.6
Liberal Democrats	Chris Smith	1,359	45.6	–6.1
Labour	Roger Berry	758	25.4	–2.6
Labour	Diane McKenzie	698	23.4	–3.0
Labour	Johnny Boyle	659	22.1	–2.6
Conservative	Mary Thomas	569	19.1	+3.0
BNP	Chris Brennan	533	17.9	N/A
Turnout		~2,982	36.3	+6.3
Registered electors		8,215		
Liberal Democrats hold				
Liberal Democrats hold				
Liberal Democrats hold				

=== Saints ===
Saints (3 seats)
Party	Candidate	Votes	%	±%
Labour	Mohammed Riaz*	1,903	50.0	+11.5
Labour	Raja Saleem*	1,841	48.4	+13.1
Labour	Morel Benard	1,751	46.0	+14.4
Liberal Democrats	Jahangir Khan	975	25.6	+4.0
Conservative	Saeed Akhtar	877	23.0	+2.0
Liberal Democrats	Mohammed Arif	794	20.9	+2.5
Liberal Democrats	Syed Shaheed	778	20.4	+2.3
Conservative	Dick Joyce	724	19.0	+5.0
Conservative	Jay Bhikha	557	14.6	N/A
Turnout		~3,806	42.1	+9.7
Registered electors		9,041		
Labour hold				
Labour hold				
Labour hold				

=== South ===
South (3 seats)
Party	Candidate	Votes	%	±%
Labour	Lynda Ireland*	840	45.0	–0.3
Labour	Dave Taylor	734	39.3	–6.0
Labour	Michelle Kiansumba	657	35.2	–9.9
Conservative	Michael Curtis	619	33.1	+9.5
Conservative	Deborah Engel	610	32.7	+13.5
Conservative	Roy Shyamal	447	23.9	+7.3
Green	Marc Schiemann	266	14.2	N/A
Liberal Democrats	Martin Howes	249	13.3	–4.1
Liberal Democrats	Julian Wates	221	11.8	–3.8
Liberal Democrats	Mohammed Zia	162	8.7	–6.0
Turnout		~1,867	24.6	+7.5
Registered electors		7,591		
Labour hold				
Labour hold				
Labour hold				

=== Stopsley ===
Stopsley (2 seats)
Party	Candidate	Votes	%	±%
Liberal Democrats	Jenny Davies*	1,443	61.4	–5.1
Liberal Democrats	Michael Dolling*	1,345	57.3	–4.4
Conservative	Anthony Skeath	518	22.1	–0.5
Conservative	Colin Willison	518	22.1	+1.7
Labour	Russell Blake	342	14.6	+1.1
Labour	Nick Murray	327	13.9	+5.2
Turnout		~2,349	43.4	+3.4
Registered electors		5,412		
Liberal Democrats hold				
Liberal Democrats hold				

=== Sundon Park ===
Sundon Park (2 seats)
Party	Candidate	Votes	%	±%
Liberal Democrats	Doris Hinkley*	1,272	56.3	–2.8
Liberal Democrats	Anna Pederson*	1,124	49.8	–4.0
Labour	Walter Cooney	648	28.7	–0.8
Labour	Brian Ellis	541	24.0	–4.2
Conservative	Jonathan Titmus	331	14.7	+5.9
Conservative	Karl Rachwal	298	13.2	+4.7
Turnout		~2,258	39.9	+4.7
Registered electors		5,659		
Liberal Democrats hold				
Liberal Democrats hold				

=== Wigmore ===
Wigmore (3 seats)
Party	Candidate	Votes	%	±%
Liberal Democrats	Roy Davies*	1,714	59.4	–8.9
Liberal Democrats	Peter Chapman*	1,591	55.1	–10.6
Liberal Democrats	Mick Siederer	1,428	49.5	–12.7
Conservative	Geoffrey Dillingham	618	21.4	+5.9
Conservative	Jean Ashby	611	21.2	+6.0
Labour	Paul Castleman	432	15.0	±0.0
Labour	Maureen McGarvie	412	14.3	+1.0
Labour	Alex Flegman	385	13.3	+0.5
UKIP	Lance Richardson	327	11.3	+8.4
Turnout		~2,258	34.0	+7.0
Registered electors		8,489		
Liberal Democrats hold				
Liberal Democrats hold				
Liberal Democrats hold				
