= 2003 Luton Borough Council election =

2003 English local election

- 1 May 2003

All 48 seats to Luton Borough Council 25 seats needed for a majority

	First party	Second party
Party	Labour	Liberal Democrats
Seats won	23	20
Seat change	▼13	▲11
Popular vote	32,583	34,345
Percentage	35.0%	37.9%
Swing	▼13.4%	▲15.0%
	Third party	Fourth party
Party	Conservative	Independent
Seats won	4	1
Seat change	▲1	▲1
Popular vote	20,880	3,879
Percentage	22.4%	4.2%
Swing	▼2.6%	N/A
- Results by ward
Control before election
Labour
Control after election
No overall control

The 2003 Luton Borough Council election took place on 1 May 2003 to elect members of Luton Borough Council in Bedfordshire, England. This was on the same day as other local elections.

== Summary ==
=== Election result ===
2003 Luton Borough Council election
Party	Candidates	Seats	Gains	Losses	Net gain/loss	Seats %	Votes %	Votes	+/−
Labour	48	23	0	11	▼13	47.9	35.0	32,583	–13.4
Liberal Democrats	48	20	8	0	▲11	41.7	37.9	35,345	+15.0
Conservative	47	4	2	0	▲1	8.3	22.4	20,880	–2.6
Independent	11	1	1	0	▲1	2.1	4.2	3,879	N/A
UKIP	4	0	0	0	Steady	0.0	0.3	301	+0.2
Green	1	0	0	0	Steady	0.0	0.2	175	–0.5

== Ward results ==
Incumbent councillors standing for re-election are marked with an asterisk (*). Changes in seats do not take into account by-elections or defections.

=== Barnfield ===
Barnfield (2 seats)
Party	Candidate	Votes	%
Liberal Democrats	David Chapman	1,001	55.0
Liberal Democrats	Martin Pantling	887	48.8
Conservative	Arthur Flint	698	38.4
Conservative	John Heredia	614	33.8
Labour	Ronald Bramwell	285	15.7
Labour	Raymond Sills	261	14.4
Turnout		~1,819	33.8
Registered electors		5,381	
Liberal Democrats win (new seat)			
Liberal Democrats win (new seat)			

=== Biscot ===
Biscot (3 seats)
Party	Candidate	Votes	%	±%
Liberal Democrats	Qurban Hussain	1,648	48.3	+22.8
Liberal Democrats	Abid Hussain	1,625	47.6	+37.9
Liberal Democrats	Asif Iqbal	1,522	44.6	N/A
Labour	Akhtar Masood*	1,103	32.3	–17.3
Labour	Ali Mohammed*	1,022	29.9	–18.7
Labour	Neville White*	998	29.2	–15.5
Conservative	Frederick Grant	410	12.0	–6.2
Conservative	Reuben Fevrier	354	10.4	–2.8
Conservative	Mohammed Ijaz	317	9.3	–3.6
Turnout		~3,415	36.3	–3.6
Registered electors		9,407		
Liberal Democrats gain from Labour				
Liberal Democrats gain from Labour				
Liberal Democrats gain from Labour				

=== Bramingham ===
Bramingham (2 seats)
Party	Candidate	Votes	%	±%
Conservative	Gilbert Campbell	814	52.9	+15.3
Conservative	David Johnston*	811	52.7	+15.9
Labour	Peter Blanking	429	27.9	–16.5
Labour	Kerry McCarthy*	397	25.8	–16.9
Liberal Democrats	Yvonne Edmunds	262	17.0	+4.9
Liberal Democrats	John Doyle	247	16.0	+4.6
Turnout		~1,540	26.4	+1.7
Registered electors		5,833		
Conservative gain from Labour				
Conservative gain from Labour				

=== Challney ===
Challney (3 seats)
Party	Candidate	Votes	%	±%
Liberal Democrats	Andrew Strange	1,268	44.2	+29.7
Liberal Democrats	Clive Mead	1,229	42.8	+32.2
Liberal Democrats	Sidney Rutstein	1,197	41.7	+31.8
Labour	Brian Devenish*	795	27.7	–27.2
Labour	Waheed Akbar*	748	26.0	–24.9
Labour	Mahmood Hussain*	677	23.6	–26.8
Conservative	Said Khan	564	19.6	–8.6
Conservative	David Read	546	19.0	–6.8
Conservative	Abdul Bhatti	537	18.7	–5.9
Independent	Abdul Rashid	172	6.0	N/A
Turnout		~2,871	32.3	
Registered electors		8,890		
Liberal Democrats gain from Labour				
Liberal Democrats gain from Labour				
Liberal Democrats gain from Labour				

=== Crawley ===
Crawley (2 seats)
Party	Candidate	Votes	%	±%
Liberal Democrats	David Franks*	1,081	68.6	+7.0
Liberal Democrats	Lawrence Patterson*	1,012	64.3	+5.8
Labour	Diane McKenzie	298	18.9	–9.1
Labour	Travor Utting	239	15.2	–8.5
Conservative	Mark Bradley	214	13.6	+3.3
Conservative	Mary Thomas	191	12.1	+2.0
Turnout		~1,575	28.9	+0.5
Registered electors		5,450		
Liberal Democrats hold				
Liberal Democrats hold				

=== Dallow ===
Dallow (3 seats)
Party	Candidate	Votes	%	±%
Labour	Mohammed Ashraf*	1,097	35.2	–33.7
Independent	Mohammed Bashir	956	30.6	N/A
Labour	Mohammed Farooq	901	28.9	–38.2
Labour	David Taylor*	811	26.0	–27.7
Liberal Democrats	Mohd Arif	783	25.1	–0.2
Liberal Democrats	Margaret Knape	693	22.2	+7.6
Independent	Nasreen Imtiaz	654	21.0	N/A
Liberal Democrats	Roger Knape	572	18.3	+5.0
Conservative	Dolly Awosusi	307	9.8	–10.7
Conservative	Lucia Melillo	290	9.3	–5.4
Conservative	Adrian Noller	261	8.4	+0.2
Turnout		~3,121	31.7	–2.3
Registered electors		9,844		
Labour hold				
Independent gain from Labour				
Labour hold				

=== Farley ===
Farley (3 seats)
Party	Candidate	Votes	%	±%
Labour	William McKenzie*	1,133	56.8	–15.2
Labour	Johnny Boyle*	1,126	56.4	–14.6
Labour	Maureen McGarvie*	1,087	54.5	–16.2
Conservative	Kevin Drew	386	19.3	+4.4
Conservative	John Tyler	351	17.6	+3.0
Conservative	John Sentinella	347	17.4	+3.7
Liberal Democrats	Christine Cason	320	16.0	+8.6
Liberal Democrats	Joyce Felmingham	289	14.5	+7.4
Liberal Democrats	Sharon Virgo	252	12.6	+6.3
UKIP	Judy King	86	4.3	N/A
UKIP	Robert Field	76	3.8	N/A
UKIP	Charles Lawman	73	3.7	N/A
Turnout		~1,995	24.8	–1.9
Registered electors		8,044		
Labour hold				
Labour hold				
Labour hold				

=== High Town ===
High Town (2 seats)
Party	Candidate	Votes	%	±%
Labour	Hugh Magill*	647	43.4	–13.9
Labour	Lakhbir Singh*	497	33.3	–22.4
Conservative	Meherban Khan	462	31.0	+4.9
Conservative	John Young	461	30.9	+6.6
Liberal Democrats	Tera Mia	205	13.8	+0.9
Green	Lyn Bliss	175	11.7	+3.2
Liberal Democrats	Naeem Khan	149	10.0	–1.2
Independent	Jurgen Prendergast	114	7.6	N/A
Turnout		~1,491	26.4	+1.3
Registered electors		5,646		
Labour hold				
Labour hold				

=== Icknield ===
Icknield (2 seats)
Party	Candidate	Votes	%	±%
Conservative	Michael Garrett	977	56.6	+1.1
Conservative	John Titmuss	948	54.9	+1.6
Labour	Gwyneth Griffiths	461	26.7	–7.3
Labour	Nazia Cheesman	449	26.0	–6.6
Liberal Democrats	Michael Lincoln	240	13.9	+2.6
Liberal Democrats	John Robinson	226	13.1	+2.2
Turnout		~1,727	29.5	+1.8
Registered electors		5,854		
Conservative hold				
Conservative hold				

=== Leagrave ===
Leagrave (3 seats)
Party	Candidate	Votes	%	±%
Labour	Derrick Patten*	769	44.1	–10.8
Labour	Sheila Roden*	682	39.1	–14.7
Labour	Desline Stewart	670	38.4	–15.0
Conservative	Dean Fryer-Saxby	577	33.1	+1.7
Conservative	Jonathan Titmuss	570	32.7	+2.4
Conservative	Kajal Debnath	526	30.2	+1.2
Liberal Democrats	Brian Richardson	342	19.6	+8.4
Liberal Democrats	Sally Fazekas	327	18.7	+8.6
Liberal Democrats	Hasmita Soni	282	16.2	+7.2
Turnout		~1,744	21.7	–1.9
Registered electors		8,037		
Labour hold				
Labour hold				
Labour hold				

=== Lewsey ===
Lewsey (3 seats)
Party	Candidate	Votes	%	±%
Labour	Michael Hand*	1,029	52.2	–21.5
Labour	Thomas Shaw*	999	50.7	–21.4
Labour	Hazel Simmons*	936	47.5	–18.6
Conservative	Raymond Quinn	470	23.9	+1.1
Conservative	Richard Stanghan	436	22.1	–0.1
Conservative	Robert Theobald	424	21.5	–0.2
Liberal Democrats	Philip Elmes	382	19.4	+6.1
Liberal Democrats	Jean Wates*	333	16.9	+7.4
Liberal Democrats	Brenda Siederer	327	16.6	+9.1
Turnout		~1,970	21.9	+3.8
Registered electors		8,997		
Labour hold				
Labour hold				
Labour hold				

=== Limbury ===
Limbury (2 seats)
Party	Candidate	Votes	%	±%
Labour	Norris Bullock*	732	41.4	–12.8
Labour	Robin Harris*	676	38.2	–15.5
Conservative	Trevor Bell	644	36.4	+10.4
Conservative	Susan Lister	585	33.1	+8.2
Independent	Colin Brown	274	15.5	N/A
Liberal Democrats	Lucy Fensome	203	11.5	+4.4
Liberal Democrats	Robert Hargreaves	203	11.5	+4.5
Turnout		~1,770	30.4	+0.4
Registered electors		5,822		
Labour hold				
Labour hold				

=== Northwell ===
Northwell (2 seats)
Party	Candidate	Votes	%
Labour	Roy Davis*	554	51.3
Labour	Don Worlding*	490	45.4
Conservative	Joseph O'Neill	226	20.9
Conservative	Pauline O'Neill	213	19.7
Liberal Democrats	John Roberts	181	16.8
Liberal Democrats	Ruth Roberts	164	15.2
Independent	Robert Jones	70	6.5
Independent	Rajinder Mahrra	67	6.2
Turnout		~1,079	18.0
Registered electors		5,995	
Labour win (new seat)			
Labour win (new seat)			

=== Round Green ===
Round Green (3 seats)
Party	Candidate	Votes	%
Liberal Democrats	Alan Skepelhorn	1,334	53.7
Liberal Democrats	Julian Wates*	1,298	52.3
Liberal Democrats	Martin Howes	1,284	51.7
Labour	Roger Berry	696	28.0
Labour	Klazina Coleman*	655	26.4
Labour	Laurence McCowen*	614	24.7
Conservative	Natalie Feerick	399	16.1
Conservative	Samson Victor	378	15.2
Conservative	Irum Khan	353	14.2
Turnout		~2,483	30.0
Registered electors		8,276	
Liberal Democrats win (new seat)			
Liberal Democrats win (new seat)			
Liberal Democrats win (new seat)			

=== Saints ===
Saints (3 seats)
Party	Candidate	Votes	%	±%
Labour	Mohammed Riaz	1,090	38.5	–7.1
Labour	Raja Saleem*	998	35.3	–9.1
Labour	Mohamad Yasin*	895	31.6	–8.5
Independent	Yasin Rehman	866	30.6	N/A
Liberal Democrats	Ruth Fisher	610	21.6	+13.5
Conservative	Mushtaq Khan	593	21.0	–19.1
Liberal Democrats	Julia Mead	521	18.4	+10.3
Liberal Democrats	Aubrey Gaughan	513	18.1	+11.0
Conservative	Soukat Mohammed	395	14.0	–13.2
Independent	Arshad Mahmood	344	12.2	N/A
Turnout		~2,830	32.4	–4.1
Registered electors		8,736		
Labour hold				
Labour hold				
Labour hold				

=== South ===
South (3 seats)
Party	Candidate	Votes	%	±%
Labour	Lynda Ireland	681	45.3	–8.6
Labour	Sian Timoney	681	45.3	–7.1
Labour	Timothy Hoyle*	678	45.1	–5.3
Conservative	Cecil Kilic	354	23.6	–4.9
Conservative	Miriam Tantardini	289	19.2	–9.1
Liberal Democrats	William Cole	261	17.4	+9.3
Conservative	Ashvin Ladwa	250	16.6	–9.3
Independent	Peter Hunt	242	16.1	N/A
Liberal Democrats	Christopher Turner	234	15.6	+7.9
Liberal Democrats	Edwin Hird	221	14.7	+8.2
Independent	Janet Duncan	120	8.0	N/A
Turnout		~1,503	17.1	–2.2
Registered electors		8,787		
Labour hold				
Labour hold				
Labour hold				

=== Stopsley ===
Stopsley (2 seats)
Party	Candidate	Votes	%	±%
Liberal Democrats	Jenny Davies	1,459	66.5	+9.4
Liberal Democrats	Michael Dolling*	1,355	61.7	+7.7
Conservative	Colin Willison	496	22.6	+7.7
Conservative	Anthony Skeath	447	20.4	+5.5
Labour	Jennifer Davis	297	13.5	–14.8
Labour	Kaman Raja	190	8.7	–16.5
Turnout		~2,195	40.0	+6.4
Registered electors		5,487		
Liberal Democrats hold				
Liberal Democrats hold				

=== Sundon Park ===
Sundon Park (2 seats)
Party	Candidate	Votes	%	±%
Liberal Democrats	Doris Hinkley	1,189	59.1	+26.9
Liberal Democrats	Anna Pedersen	1,083	53.8	+22.6
Labour	Sydney Knight*	593	29.5	–16.5
Labour	Anthony Banerji*	567	28.2	–14.9
Conservative	Anthony Duckworth	178	8.8	–3.3
Conservative	Sheila Harrison	172	8.5	–3.3
Turnout		~2,013	35.2	+2.9
Registered electors		5,718		
Liberal Democrats gain from Labour				
Liberal Democrats gain from Labour				

=== Wigmore ===
Wigmore (3 seats)
Party	Candidate	Votes	%
Liberal Democrats	Roy Davies*	1,577	68.3
Liberal Democrats	Peter Chapman	1,518	65.7
Liberal Democrats	Henry Siederer*	1,436	62.2
Conservative	Jean Ashby	358	15.5
Conservative	Geoffery Dillingham	351	15.2
Labour	Linda Hambleton*	347	15.0
Conservative	Margaret Willmott	336	14.5
Labour	John Hutcheson	307	13.3
Labour	Anne Thompson	296	12.8
UKIP	Lance Richardson	66	2.9
Turnout		~2,309	27.0
Registered electors		8,553	
Liberal Democrats win (new seat)			
Liberal Democrats win (new seat)			
Liberal Democrats win (new seat)			
