= 2015 Luton Borough Council election =

2015 UK local government election

- 7 May 2015

All 48 seats to Luton Borough Council 25 seats needed for a majority

	First party	Second party	Third party
Party	Labour	Liberal Democrats	Conservative
Seats won	35	8	5
Seat change	▼1	Steady	▲1
Popular vote	95,242	25,854	48,262
Percentage	53.6%	14.6%	27.2%
Swing	▲4.9%	▼9.4%	▲2.8%
Control before election
Labour
Control after election
Labour

The 2015 Luton Borough Council election took place on 7 May 2015 to elect members of Luton Borough Council in Bedfordshire, England. This was on the same day as other local elections.

== Summary ==
=== Election result ===
2015 Luton Borough Council election
Party	Candidates	Seats	Gains	Losses	Net gain/loss	Seats %	Votes %	Votes	+/−
Labour	48	35	0	1	▼1	72.9	53.6	95,242	+4.9
Liberal Democrats	30	8	0	0	Steady	16.7	14.6	25,854	–9.4
Conservative	46	5	1	0	▲1	10.4	27.2	48,262	+2.8
UKIP	8	0	0	0	Steady	0.0	3.6	6,334	+2.8
Green	3	0	0	0	Steady	0.0	0.8	1,457	±0.0
Independent	1	0	0	0	Steady	0.0	0.1	219	–0.8

== Ward results ==
Incumbent councillors standing for re-election are marked with an asterisk (*). Changes in seats do not take into account by-elections or defections.

=== Barnfield ===
Barnfield (2 seats)
Party	Candidate	Votes	%	±%
Labour	Rachel Hopkins*	1,541	39.9	+8.1
Liberal Democrats	David Franks*	1,243	32.2	–2.8
Liberal Democrats	Clive Mead	1,089	28.2	–3.1
Conservative	Dean Garrett	952	24.6	–2.1
Labour	Francis Steer	940	24.3	–2.0
Conservative	Lyndon Francis	846	21.9	–3.5
Turnout		3,861	67.3	+20.7
Registered electors		5,740		
Labour hold				
Liberal Democrats hold				

=== Biscot ===
Biscot (3 seats)
Party	Candidate	Votes	%	±%
Labour	Tahir Khan*	3,636	62.2	+12.8
Labour	Ayub Mohammed*	3,544	60.6	+15.1
Labour	Naseem Ayub*	3,453	59.0	+14.4
Conservative	Abu Syed Ahmed	916	15.7	+2.9
Liberal Democrats	Amjid Ali	720	12.3	–22.2
Liberal Democrats	Muhammad Ramzan	606	10.4	–17.4
Liberal Democrats	Kaseem Razavi	567	9.7	–15.5
Conservative	Syed Rahman	520	8.9	+1.3
UKIP	Grace Froggatt	353	6.0	N/A
Independent	Forid Chowdhury	219	3.7	+0.1
Turnout		5,849	59.8	+9.6
Registered electors		9,780		
Labour hold				
Labour hold				
Labour hold				

=== Bramingham ===
Bramingham (2 seats)
Party	Candidate	Votes	%	±%
Conservative	Gilbert Campbell*	1,905	47.3	–7.2
Conservative	Victor Young	1,496	37.1	–15.7
Labour	Greg Burton	1,175	29.2	+2.3
Labour	Ali Alkkul	821	20.4	–3.3
UKIP	Richard Roe	771	19.1	N/A
Liberal Democrats	Doris Hinkley	239	5.9	–2.5
Liberal Democrats	Michael Lincoln	217	5.4	+1.2
Turnout		4,028	71.0	+28.6
Registered electors		5,677		
Conservative hold				
Conservative hold				

=== Challney ===
Challney (3 seats)
Party	Candidate	Votes	%	±%
Labour	Tom Shaw*	2,695	48.7	–6.7
Labour	Tahir Malik*	2,665	48.1	+4.3
Labour	Yasmin Waheed	2,184	39.5	–3.4
Conservative	John Heredia	1,331	24.0	+12.4
Conservative	Deloris Campbell	1,296	23.4	+11.8
UKIP	Paul Noble	910	16.4	N/A
Liberal Democrats	Chaudhry Khalid	688	12.4	–18.6
Liberal Democrats	Aroosa Ulzama	501	9.1	–21.8
Liberal Democrats	Nisar Mohammed	351	6.3	–18.3
Turnout		5,535	59.6	+15.8
Registered electors		9,289		
Labour hold				
Labour hold				
Labour hold				

=== Crawley ===
Crawley (2 seats)
Party	Candidate	Votes	%	±%
Labour	James Taylor	1,067	32.6	–6.4
Liberal Democrats	Terry Keens*	962	29.3	–7.8
Labour	Maahwish Mirza	846	25.8	–8.5
Liberal Democrats	Usman Hussain	725	22.1	–4.7
Conservative	Mohammed Islam	681	20.8	–4.8
Conservative	Azizul Ambia	625	19.1	–1.5
UKIP	Riasat Ali	591	18.0	N/A
Turnout		3,278	61.3	+19.0
Registered electors		5,352		
Labour hold				
Liberal Democrats hold				

=== Dallow ===
Dallow (3 seats)
Party	Candidate	Votes	%	±%
Labour	Mohammed Ashraf*	3,374	60.9	+18.6
Labour	Mohammad Farooq*	3,273	59.0	+18.2
Labour	Nazia Rafiq	3,183	57.4	+17.5
Liberal Democrats	Ali Isahaq	905	16.3	–11.8
Liberal Democrats	Sadiq Subhani	869	15.7	–9.5
Conservative	Mohammad Hussain	750	13.5	–0.9
Liberal Democrats	Jamshed Khan	718	16.3	–9.5
Conservative	Mohammed Choudhury	639	11.5	+3.4
Conservative	Simidele Adedeji	474	8.6	+1.3
Turnout		5,543	56.5	+8.0
Registered electors		9,815		
Labour hold				
Labour hold				
Labour hold				

=== Farley ===
Farley (3 seats)
Party	Candidate	Votes	%	±%
Labour	David Taylor*	2,497	56.2	+0.8
Labour	Mahmood Hussain*	2,319	52.2	–2.1
Labour	Sian Timoney*	2,289	51.5	–2.0
Conservative	Kevin Drew	1,081	24.3	+6.1
Conservative	Shirley Noller	949	21.4	+6.4
Conservative	Shyamal Roy	807	18.2	+3.6
Liberal Democrats	William Cole	336	7.6	–2.9
Liberal Democrats	Lawrence Patterson	264	5.9	–2.3
Liberal Democrats	Andy Strange	238	5.4	–1.3
Turnout		4,442	56.6	+19.1
Registered electors		7,844		
Labour hold				
Labour hold				
Labour hold				

=== High Town ===
High Town (2 seats)
Party	Candidate	Votes	%	±%
Labour	Andy Malcolm*	1,442	49.3	–5.0
Labour	Aysegul Gurbuz	1,039	35.5	–12.9
Conservative	Mohammed Choudhury	791	27.0	+0.6
Conservative	Basit Mahmood	748	25.6	+2.1
Green	Lyn Bliss	479	16.4	+6.1
Green	Colin Hall	329	11.2	N/A
Turnout		2,927	52.7	+18.4
Registered electors		5,550		
Labour hold				
Labour hold				

=== Icknield ===
Icknield (2 seats)
Party	Candidate	Votes	%	±%
Conservative	Mike Garrett*	1,854	56.5	+5.8
Conservative	Jeff Petts	1,761	53.7	+6.8
Labour	Tipu Moheeuddin	1,289	39.3	+3.7
Labour	Anum Yaqoob	969	29.5	–3.3
Liberal Democrats	Yvonne Edwards	389	11.9	+2.5
Liberal Democrats	Brian Richardson	300	9.1	+2.5
Turnout		4,061	68.0	+23.3
Registered electors		5,975		
Conservative hold				
Conservative hold				

=== Leagrave ===
Leagrave (3 seats)
Party	Candidate	Votes	%	±%
Labour	Sheila Roden*	2,261	64.3	–1.9
Labour	Waheed Akbar*	2,191	62.3	–2.3
Labour	Sameera Saleem	1,802	51.3	–10.2
Conservative	Sue Garrett	1,680	47.8	+8.9
Conservative	Dick Joyce	1,353	38.5	+1.5
Conservative	Ifthekher Alom	1,260	35.8	+3.9
Turnout		4,851	58.5	+19.3
Registered electors		8,295		
Labour hold				
Labour hold				
Labour hold				

=== Lewsey ===
Lewsey (3 seats)
Party	Candidate	Votes	%	±%
Labour	Hazel Simmons*	2,598	49,8	–11.8
Labour	Jacqui Burnett*	2,592	49.7	–8.9
Labour	Mohammad Khan	2,193	42.1	–7.8
Conservative	Edward Dodd	1,297	24.9	–1.6
UKIP	Michael Rowland	1,204	23.1	N/A
Conservative	Balal Khan	986	18.9	–2.2
Conservative	Shakeel Khanzada	714	13.7	–6.9
Turnout		5,212	57.4	+23.7
Registered electors		9,083		
Labour hold				
Labour hold				
Labour hold				

=== Limbury ===
Limbury (2 seats)
Party	Candidate	Votes	%	±%
Labour	Steve Lewis*	2,099	55.5	+6.8
Labour	Jennifer Rowlands	1,597	42.2	–5.7
Conservative	David Coulter	1,382	36.5	–1.2
Conservative	Rashid Mezanur	902	23.8	–11.7
Turnout		3,784	63.3	+18.5
Registered electors		5,976		
Labour hold				
Labour hold				

=== Northwell ===
Northwell (2 seats)
Party	Candidate	Votes	%	±%
Labour	Roy Davis*	1,800	57.6	–0.8
Labour	Don Worlding*	1,569	50.2	–6.8
Conservative	Lesley Hill	986	31.6	+9.7
Conservative	Aina Taurina	585	18.7	+2.0
Turnout		3,123	58.2	+25.2
Registered electors		5,363		
Labour hold				
Labour hold				

=== Round Green ===
Round Green (3 seats)
Party	Candidate	Votes	%	±%
Labour	Mark Rivers*	2,254	43.8	+5.2
Conservative	John Baker	1,762	34.3	+6.3
Labour	Irak Chowdhury	1,752	34.1	+0.8
Conservative	Philip Turner	1,682	32.7	+7.2
Labour	Yaqub Hanif*	1,613	31.4	+0.3
Conservative	Mohammed Arif	1,221	23.7	–1.1
Liberal Democrats	Barry Neale	845	16.4	–13.7
Liberal Democrats	Sydney Rurstein	692	13.5	–15.8
Liberal Democrats	Mohamad Yasin	468	9.1	–18.4
Turnout		5,144	61.8	+21.6
Registered electors		8,321		
Labour hold				
Conservative gain from Labour				
Labour hold				

=== Saints ===
Saints (3 seats)
Party	Candidate	Votes	%	±%
Labour	Asma Rathore*	3,701	64.2	+13.1
Labour	Mohammed Riaz*	3,512	60.9	+12.5
Labour	Raja Saleem*	3,377	58.6	+12.4
Conservative	Asif Choudhery	1,001	17.4	+1.7
Conservative	Asif Iqbal	999	17.3	+3.5
Conservative	Mehrban Khan	776	13.5	–0.1
UKIP	Shahid Iqbal	590	10.2	N/A
Turnout		5,764	59.8	+12.0
Registered electors		9,639		
Labour hold				
Labour hold				
Labour hold				

=== South ===
South (3 seats)
Party	Candidate	Votes	%	±%
Labour	Amy O'Callaghan*	1,898	49.1	+1.01
Labour	Paul Castleman	1,787	46.3	+0.1
Labour	David Agbley	1,655	42.9	–2.0
Conservative	Morel Bernard	1,075	27.8	–3.7
Conservative	John French	1,061	27.5	+2.0
Conservative	Naeem Khan	773	20.0	–5.0
Green	Jim Fisher	649	16.8	+9.0
Turnout		3,862	48.3	+17.9
Registered electors		7,994		
Labour hold				
Labour hold				
Labour hold				

=== Stopsley ===
Stopsley (2 seats)
Party	Candidate	Votes	%	±%
Liberal Democrats	Michael Dolling*	1,936	50.3	+2.6
Liberal Democrats	Cora Dolling	1,912	49.7	+10.3
Conservative	Anthony Skeath	891	23.2	–5.8
Labour	John Hutcheson	678	17.6	–5.4
Conservative	Mohammed Arif	626	16.3	–9.4
Labour	Mohammed Khan	445	11.6	–7.3
Turnout		3,846	68.2	+22.0
Registered electors		5,641		
Liberal Democrats hold				
Liberal Democrats hold				

=== Sundon Park ===
Sundon Park (2 seats)
Party	Candidate	Votes	%	±%
Labour	Fiona Green	1,342	35.9	–6.4
Liberal Democrats	Anna Pedersen	1,174	31.4	–10.9
Labour	John Whittaker	1,100	29.4	–5.9
Liberal Democrats	Julia Mead	1,051	28.1	–6.2
Conservative	Kevin Chapman	886	23.7	+6.0
Conservative	Jonathan Saxty	811	21.7	+8.8
Turnout		3,737	63.7	+17.7
Registered electors		5,866		
Labour hold				
Liberal Democrats hold				

=== Wigmore ===
Wigmore (3 seats)
Party	Candidate	Votes	%	±%
Liberal Democrats	Peter Chapman*	2,091	36.2	–6.2
Liberal Democrats	Diane Moles*	1,900	32.9	–4.5
Liberal Democrats	Alan Skepelhorn	1,858	32.2	–1.4
Conservative	Tim Nagel	1,288	22.3	–2.1
Conservative	Geoff Simons	1,246	21.6	–2.2
Labour	Gareth Lewis	1,127	19.5	–4.2
Labour	Paul Stone	1,089	18.9	–4.7
UKIP	Russell Davis	1,026	17.8	+8.0
Conservative	Farook Hussein	1,006	17.4	+0.5
Labour	Mohammed Islam	969	16.8	–5.4
UKIP	Lance Richardson	889	15.4	H/A
Turnout		5,777	66.6	+27.3
Registered electors		8,670		
Liberal Democrats hold				
Liberal Democrats hold				
Liberal Democrats hold				
