= Carole Lombard filmography =

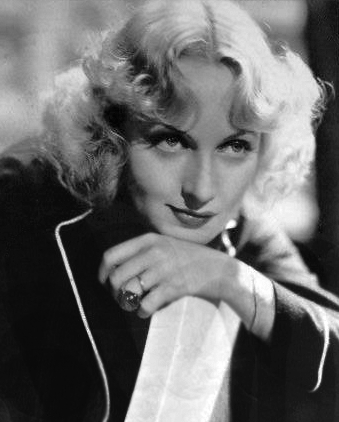
Lombard in 1935

Carole Lombard (1908–1942) was an American cinema actress who appeared in 58 feature films (16 silent and 42 sound films) and 18 short films in a career spanning 21 years before her death in an airplane crash at the age of 33.

== Filmography ==
=== Silent features ===
Year	Film	Role	Director	Studio	Notes
1921	A Perfect Crime	Grigg's sister	Allan Dwan	Associated Producers	Credited as Jane Peters; Lost film
1924	Gold Heels	Bit part	W. S. Van Dyke	Fox Film Corporation	Uncredited
1925	Dick Turpin	Crowd Extra	John G. Blystone	Fox Film Corporation	Uncredited
1925	Gold and the Girl		Edmund Mortimer	Fox Film Corporation	Uncredited; Lost film
1925	Pretty Ladies	Showgirl	Monta Bell	Metro-Goldwyn-Mayer	Uncredited
1925	Marriage in Transit	Celia Hathaway	Roy William Neill	Fox Film Corporation	Credited as Carol Lombard; Lost film
1925	Hearts and Spurs	Sybil Estabrook	W. S. Van Dyke	Fox Film Corporation	Credited as Carol Lombard
1925	Durand of the Bad Lands	Ellen Boyd	Lynn Reynolds	Fox Film Corporation	Credited as Carol Lombard; Lost film
1926	The Road to Glory		Howard Hawks	Fox Film Corporation	Uncredited; Lost film
1927	My Best Girl	Flirty Salesgirl	Sam Taylor	United Artists	Uncredited
1927	The Girl from Everywhere	Vera Veranda	Edward F. Cline	Pathé Exchange	
1928	The Divine Sinner	Millie Claudert	Scott Pembroke	Rayart Pictures Corporation	Credited as Carol Lombard; Lost film
1928	Power	Another Dame	Howard Higgin	Pathé Exchange	Credited as Carol Lombard
1928	Me, Gangster	Blonde Rosie	Raoul Walsh	Fox Film Corporation	Credited as Carol Lombard; Lost film
1928	Show Folks	Cleo	Paul L. Stein	Pathé Exchange	Credited as Carol Lombard
1928	Ned McCobb's Daughter	Jennie	William J. Cowen	Pathé Exchange	Credited as Carol Lombard; Lost film

=== Sound features ===
Year	Film	Role	Director	Studio	Notes
1929	High Voltage	Billie Davis	Howard Higgin	Pathé Exchange	Credited as Carol Lombard
1929	Big News	Margaret Banks	Gregory La Cava	Pathé Exchange	Credited as Carol Lombard
1929	The Racketeer	Rhoda Philbrooke	Howard Higgin	Pathé Exchange	Credited as Carol Lombard
1930	The Arizona Kid	Virginia Hoyt	Alfred Santell	Fox Film Corporation	
1930	Safety in Numbers	Pauline	Victor Schertzinger	Paramount Pictures	
1930	Fast and Loose	Alice O'Neil	Fred C. Newmeyer	Paramount Pictures	
1931	It Pays to Advertise	Mary Grayson	Frank Tuttle	Paramount Pictures	
1931	Man of the World	Mary Kendall	Richard Wallace	Paramount Pictures	First of three films with William Powell, whom she married three months after its release
1931	Ladies' Man	Rachel Fendley	Lothar Mendes	Paramount Pictures	Second of three films with William Powell
1931	Up Pops the Devil	Anne Merrick	A. Edward Sutherland	Paramount Pictures	
1931	I Take This Woman	Kay Dowling	Marion Gering	Paramount Pictures	
1932	No One Man	Penelope 'Nep' Newbold	Lloyd Corrigan	Paramount Pictures	
1932	Sinners in the Sun	Doris Blake	Alexander Hall	Paramount Pictures	
1932	Virtue	Mae	Edward Buzzell	Columbia Pictures	
1932	No More Orchids	Annie Holt	Walter Lang	Columbia Pictures	
1932	No Man of Her Own	Connie Randall	Wesley Ruggles	Paramount Pictures	Only film with Clark Gable, whom she married in 1939
1933	From Hell to Heaven	Colly Tanner	Erle C. Kenton	Paramount Pictures	
1933	Supernatural	Roma Courtney	Victor Halperin	Paramount Pictures	
1933	The Eagle and the Hawk	Beautiful lady	Stuart Walker	Paramount Pictures	
1933	Brief Moment	Abby Fane	David Burton	Paramount Pictures	
1933	White Woman	Judith Denning	Stuart Walker	Paramount Pictures	
1934	Bolero	Helen Hathaway	Wesley Ruggles	Paramount Pictures	
1934	We're Not Dressing	Doris Worthington	Norman Taurog	Paramount Pictures	
1934	Twentieth Century	Lily Garland, aka Mildred Plotka	Howard Hawks	Columbia Pictures	
1934	Now and Forever	Toni Carstairs Day	Henry Hathaway	Paramount Pictures	
1934	Lady by Choice	Alabam Lee	David Burton	Columbia Pictures	
1934	The Gay Bride	Mary Magiz	Jack Conway	Metro-Goldwyn-Mayer	
1935	Rumba	Diana Harrison	Marion Gering	Paramount Pictures	
1935	Hands Across the Table	Regi Allen	Mitchell Leisen	Paramount Pictures	First of four films with Fred MacMurray
1936	Love Before Breakfast	Kay Colby	Walter Lang	Universal Pictures	
1936	The Princess Comes Across	Princess Olga	William K. Howard	Paramount Pictures	Second of four films with Fred MacMurray
1936	My Man Godfrey	Irene Bullock	Gregory La Cava	Universal Pictures	Nominated - Academy Award for Best Actress; Her final film with William Powell
1937	Swing High, Swing Low	Maggie King	Mitchell Leisen	Paramount Pictures	Third of four films with Fred MacMurray
1937	Nothing Sacred	Hazel Flagg	William A. Wellman	United Artists	Her only film in Technicolor
1937	True Confession	Helen Barlett	Wesley Ruggles	Paramount Pictures	Fourth and final film with Fred MacMurray
1938	Fools for Scandal	Kay Winters	Mervyn LeRoy	Warner Bros.	
1939	Made for Each Other	Jane Mason	John Cromwell	United Artists	
1939	In Name Only	Julie Eden	John Cromwell	RKO Radio Pictures	
1940	Vigil in the Night	Anne Lee	George Stevens	RKO Radio Pictures	
1940	They Knew What They Wanted	Amy Peters	Garson Kanin	RKO Radio Pictures	
1941	Mr. & Mrs. Smith	Ann Krausheimer Smith	Alfred Hitchcock	RKO Radio Pictures	
1942	To Be or Not to Be	Maria Tura	Ernst Lubitsch	United Artists	Released posthumously

=== Short films ===
Year	Title
1927	Smith's Pony
1927	Gold Digger of Weepah
1927	The Girl from Everywhere
1928	Run, Girl, Run
1928	The Beach Club
1928	Smith's Army Life
1928	The Best Man
1928	The Swim Princess
1928	The Bicycle Flirt
1928	The Girl from Nowhere
1928	His Unlucky Night
1928	Smith's Restaurant
1928	The Campus Vamp
1928	Motorboat Mamas
1928	Hubby's Weekend Trip
1928	The Campus Carmen
1929	Matchmaking Mamma
1929	Don't Get Jealous
