= Sea nymph =

Sea nymph may refer to:

- Amphibolis (also "sea nymph"), a genus in the family Cymodoceaceae
- Nereids, female spirits of sea waters in Greek mythology
- Sea Nymph, a 50-foot sailboat abandoned in the Pacific after its crew was rescued by the US Navy
- The Sea Nymphs (album), the self-titled debut studio album by the English psychedelic folk band the Sea Nymphs
- The Sea Nymphs (band), English psychedelic folk band from Kingston upon Thames
- The Sea Nymphs (film), a 1914 American short comedy film
- HMS Sea Nymph, ships of the Royal Navy
- PS Sea Nymph
- Violated Paradise (also Sea Nymphs), a 1963 Italian sexploitation film directed and produced by Marion Gering
