= Tommy Wonder =

Tommy Wonder may refer to:

- Tommy Wonder (dancer) (1914–1993), American dancer
- Tommy Wonder (magician) (1953–2006), Dutch magician
