= Maude Simmons =

American actress (1893–1951)

- Simmons in No Way Out (1950)
- Born: October 2, 1893; Augusta, Georgia, US
- Died: September 30, 1951 (aged 57); New York City, US
- Education: Howard University
- Notable work: Portrait of Jennie; No Way Out

Maude Simmons (October 2, 1893 – September 30, 1951) was an American singer and actress on the stage and screen. She is best known for her film roles in Portrait of Jennie (1948) and No Way Out (1950). Simmons also performed over nearly 20 years on Broadway, as part of the original cast of Show Boat and Finian's Rainbow, as well as many other musical theatre roles. In the 1947 original cast recording for Finian's Rainbow, she sang "Necessity" with Dolores Martin. Over the course of her career, she portrayed the mother of African American characters played by Paul Robeson and Sidney Poitier.

== Early life and education ==
Simmons was born in Augusta, Georgia, on October 2, 1893. She was awarded a Roland Hayes scholarship to Howard University, where she studied with Lulu Vere Childers.

== Career ==
=== Stage ===
Simmons moved to New York City and was soon cast in the original Broadway production of Show Boat, as part of the ensemble. The hit musical, which opened on May 19, 1932, launched the career of Paul Robeson. She stayed with Show Boat for four years.

In 1937, Simmons sang original Negro spirituals written by Arthur Schwartz as part of Will Vodery's choir in Virginia. She then appeared in Sing Out the News, which ran from 1937 to 1938, in which she played the fortune teller and guest.

In 1940, Simmons was reunited with Robeson, playing his mother in John Henry. In 1943, she played Mother Kanda in a revival of Run, Little Chillun.

From 1947, Simmons was part of the original cast of Finian's Rainbow. For the original cast recording, she sang the song "Necessity" with Dolores Martin and the Lyn Murray Singers with an orchestra under the direction of Ray Charles. Simmons subsequently toured with Finian's Rainbow and performed at the Philharmonic Auditorium in Los Angeles in 1949. The California Eagle called her a "brilliant dramatic actress and singer" whose performance was "outstanding". Later that year, she toured with Finian's Rainbow to San Francisco, but took a leave of absence from the show after she was cast in the film No Way Out.

=== Film ===
Simmons appeared as Lady in Junction 88, a musical produced by Alfred N. Sack and directed by George P. Quigley with songs written by J. Augustus Smith.

Her first major motion picture role was in the 1948 film Portrait of Jennie, with Jennifer Jones, Joseph Cotten, Lillian Gish and Ethel Barrymore. The project was filming in New York, and Simmons, David Wayne and Albert Sharpe, all appearing onstage in Finian's Rainbow, were recruited by producer David O. Selznick to perform simultaneously in Portrait of Jennie. Simmons played the part of Clara Morgan, a "kindly theatre dresser" who knew Jennie as a child, after she was cast in the role over Hattie McDaniel by Selznick. Author Jacqueline T. Lynch has argued that Clara as played by Simmons is "an African-American character which is not stereotyped or demeaned".

Simmons's final film role was in the 1950 film No Way Out, adapted from a novel by Lesser Samuels. She played the mother of Dr. Luther Brooks, portrayed by Sidney Poitier in his film debut. Literary scholar Barbara Lupack has noted that "the film's positive portrayal of a black middle class family, including Luther Brooks' attractive wife Cora (Mildred Joanne Smith), his pleasant mother (Maude Simmons), and their supportive friends" was unusual for this period of American film-making.

== Death ==
Simmons died in New York City on Sunday, September 30, 1951, at the age of 57.

== Filmography ==
Simmons's films include:

- No Way Out (1950)
- Portrait of Jennie (1948)
- Junction 88 (1947)

== See also ==
- African American Cinema
- Race film
- Black film
- Musical theatre
- African American musical theater
