= Gary Cooper filmography =

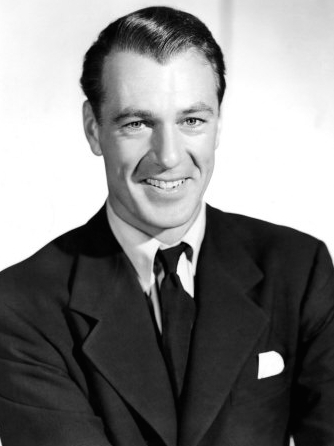
Cooper in Meet John Doe (1941)

American actor Gary Cooper started his career in 1925 as a film extra and stuntman. He made his official cinematic debut in 1926 in the Samuel Goldwyn production The Winning of Barbara Worth. He went on to become a contract player with Paramount Pictures where he established himself as a popular leading man prior to the end of the silent film era.

Cooper's future in the sound era was assured with the release of The Virginian (1929), his first all-talkie film. For the next 32 years, he would be one of cinema's top money-making stars. From 1936 to 1957, Cooper ranked 18 times among the top ten box office attractions—a record when he died in 1961, and later surpassed only by John Wayne, who ranked among the top ten 25 times, Clint Eastwood (21 times) and Tom Cruise (20 times).

Cooper was nominated for the Best Actor Academy Award five times and won twice, for Sergeant York (1942) and High Noon (1952). The latter film boosted his popularity, resulting in him being the number one box office attraction in 1953. Cooper received a third Academy Award—an honorary one—just prior to his death. His final film, The Naked Edge, was released posthumously.

As of February 2008, more than half of Gary Cooper's feature films are available on DVD, while others not yet on home video are available for television broadcast. Unfortunately, at least two of his silent films—Beau Sabreur (1928) and The Legion of the Condemned (1928)—are now considered lost films. Another of his silent films, Wolf Song (1929), was originally released as a part talkie, but survives only as a silent film. One of Cooper's earliest talkies, Paramount on Parade (1930), survives incomplete. The prints that are available for television are missing all but one of the film's Technicolor scenes—a partial restoration of these scenes was done by the UCLA Film Archives.

The filmography contains sections for Cooper's work as an extra in the earliest part of his film career, his feature film appearances, his occasional appearances in short films, and a section for a compilation film. Due to its length (92 films), the listing of his feature films is divided in four sections. Cooper's film roles are listed, as well as the names of each film's director and co-stars. Cooper's awards and nominations are also listed. Except where noted, all of his films were shot in 35mm black and white. All films released prior to Lilac Time (1928) are silent films and all from The Virginian (1929) onward are sound films. The films made during the silent-to-sound transition are noted as being either silent or sound films. As an addendum, Cooper's handful of television appearances are also listed.

== Filmography ==
=== Feature films as an extra, 1925–26 ===
Year	Title	Role	Notes	Ref
1925	Dick Turpin	Extra	Film debut	
1925	The Trail Rider	Rider		
1925	The Thundering Herd	Bit part		
1925	Riders of the Purple Sage	Rider		
1925	Drug Store Cowboy	Cowboy		
1925	Wild Horse Mesa	Cowboy		
1925	The Lucky Horseshoe	Extra		
1925	The Vanishing American	Extra		
1925	The Eagle	Masked Cossack		
1925	Tricks	Bit part		
1925	Warrior Gap	Bit part		
1925	North Star	Bit part		
1925	Ben-Hur	Roman guard		
1926	Three Pals	Bit part		
1926	The Enchanted Hill	Bit part		
1926	The Johnstown Flood	Flood survivor		
1926	A Six Shootin' Romance	Extra, Lost film		
1926	Watch Your Wife	Bit part		
1926	Thundering Speed	Bit part		

=== Feature films, 1926–30 ===
Year	Title	Role	Notes	Ref
1926	The Winning of Barbara Worth	Abe Lee		
1927	It	Reporter		
1927	Children of Divorce	Ted Larrabee		
1927	Arizona Bound	Dave Saulter	Lost film	
1927	Wings	Cadet White	Magnascope sequences	
1927	Nevada	Nevada		
1927	The Last Outlaw	Sheriff Buddy Hale		
1928	Beau Sabreur	Major Henri de Beaujolais	Lost film	
1928	The Legion of the Condemned	Gale Price	Lost film	
1928	Doomsday	Arnold Furze		
1928	Half a Bride	Captain Edmunds		
1928	Lilac Time	Captain Philip Blythe	Silent film with synchronized music and sound effects	
1928	The First Kiss	Mulligan Talbot	Silent film	
1928	The Shopworn Angel	William Tyler	Silent film with talking sequences, synchronized music, and sound effects	
1929	Wolf Song	Sam Lash	Silent film with talking sequences, synchronized music, and sound effects	
1929	Betrayal	Andre Frey	Silent film with talking sequences, synchronized music, and sound effects Lost film	
1929	The Virginian	The Virginian		
1930	Only the Brave	Captain James Braydon		
1930	Paramount on Parade	Hunter ("Dream Girl")	Part Technicolor	
1930	The Texan	Enrique, The Llano Kid		
1930	Seven Days' Leave	Kenneth Downey		
1930	A Man from Wyoming	Jim Baker		
1930	The Spoilers	Roy Glenister		
1930	Morocco	Légionnaire Tom Brown		

=== Feature films, 1931–40 ===
Year	Title	Role	Notes	Ref
1931	Fighting Caravans	Clint Belmet		
1931	City Streets	The Kid		
1931	I Take This Woman	Tom McNair		
1931	His Woman	Captain Sam Whalan		
1932	Make Me a Star	Himself (unbilled cameo)		
1932	Devil and the Deep	Lieutenant Sempter		
1932	If I Had a Million	Steve Gallagher		
1932	A Farewell to Arms	Lieutenant Frederic Henry		
1933	Today We Live	Bogard		
1933	One Sunday Afternoon	Biff Grimes		
1933	Design for Living	George Curtis		
1933	Alice in Wonderland	The White Knight		
1934	Operator 13	Captain Jack Gailliard		
1934	Now and Forever	Jerry Day		
1935	The Wedding Night	Tony Barrett		
1935	The Lives of a Bengal Lancer	Lieutenant Alan McGregor		
1935	Peter Ibbetson	Peter Ibbetson		
1936	Desire	Tom Bradley		
1936	Mr. Deeds Goes to Town	Longfellow Deeds	♦ Nominated — Academy Award for Best Actor ♦ Nominated — New York Film Critics Circle Award for Best Actor	
1936	Hollywood Boulevard	Guest at bar (unbilled cameo)		
1936	The General Died at Dawn	O'Hara		
1936	The Plainsman	Wild Bill Hickok		
1937	Souls at Sea	Michael "Nuggin" Taylor		
1938	The Adventures of Marco Polo	Marco Polo		
1938	Bluebeard's Eighth Wife	Michael Brandon		
1938	The Cowboy and the Lady	Stretch Willoughby		
1939	Beau Geste	Beau Geste		
1939	The Real Glory	Doctor Bill Canavan		
1940	The Westerner	Cole Harden		
1940	North West Mounted Police	Dusty Rivers	Technicolor	

=== Feature films, 1941–50 ===
Year	Title	Role	Notes	Ref
1941	Meet John Doe	Long John Willoughby		
1941	Sergeant York	Alvin C. York	♦ Academy Award for Best Actor ♦ New York Film Critics Circle Award for Best Actor	
1941	Ball of Fire	Prof. Bertram Potts		
1942	The Pride of the Yankees	Lou Gehrig	♦ Nominated — Academy Award for Best Actor	
1943	For Whom the Bell Tolls	Robert Jordan	Technicolor ♦ Nominated — Academy Award for Best Actor	
1944	The Story of Dr. Wassell	Dr. Corydon M. Wassell	Technicolor	
1944	Casanova Brown	Casanova Brown		
1945	Along Came Jones	Melody Jones	Also as producer	
1946	Saratoga Trunk	Col. Clint Maroon		
1946	Cloak and Dagger	Prof. Alvah Jesper		
1947	Unconquered	Capt. Christopher Holden	Technicolor	
1947	Variety Girl	Himself	Technicolor sequences	
1948	Good Sam	Sam Clayton		
1949	The Fountainhead	Howard Roark		
1949	It's a Great Feeling	Himself (unbilled cameo)	Technicolor	
1949	Task Force	Jonathan L. Scott	Technicolor sequences	
1950	Bright Leaf	Brant Royle		
1950	Dallas	Blayde Hollister	Technicolor	

=== Feature films, 1951–61 ===
Year	Title	Role	Notes	Ref
1951	You're in the Navy Now	Lt. John Harkness		
1951	Starlift	Himself (unbilled cameo)		
1951	It's a Big Country	Texas		
1951	Distant Drums	Capt. Quincy Wyatt	Technicolor	
1952	High Noon	Will Kane	♦ Academy Award for Best Actor ♦ Golden Globe Award for Best Actor ♦ Photoplay Award for Most Popular Male Star	
1952	Springfield Rifle	Major Alex Kearney	Warnercolor	
1953	Return to Paradise	Mr. Morgan	Technicolor	
1953	Blowing Wild	Jeff Dawson		
1953	Boum sur Paris	Himself		
1954	Garden of Evil	Hooker	CinemaScope; Technicolor	
1954	Vera Cruz	Benjamin Trane	Superscope; Technicolor	
1955	The Court-Martial of Billy Mitchell	Col. Billy Mitchell	CinemaScope; Warnercolor	
1956	Friendly Persuasion	Jess Birdwell	CinemaScope; Eastmancolor ♦ Nominated — Golden Globe Award for Best Actor	
1957	Love in the Afternoon	Frank Flannagan		
1958	Ten North Frederick	Joe Chapin	CinemaScope	
1958	Man of the West	Link Jones	CinemaScope; Deluxe color	
1959	The Hanging Tree	Doc Joseph Frail	Technicolor; Laurel Award for Top Action Performance	
1959	Alias Jesse James	Himself (unbilled cameo)	Deluxe color	
1959	They Came to Cordura	Major Thomas Thorn	CinemaScope; Eastmancolor ♦ Laurel Award for Top Action Performance	
1959	The Wreck of the Mary Deare	Gideon Patch	CinemaScope; Metrocolor	
1961	The Naked Edge	George Radcliffe	Posthumous release; final film role	

=== Short films ===
Year	Title	Role	Notes	Ref
1926	Lightnin' Wins	Tom Harding		
1931	The Stolen Jools	Himself		
1932	The Voice of Hollywood No. 13 (Second Series)	Himself		
1932	Hollywood on Parade	Himself		
1933	Hollywood on Parade No. A-13	Himself		
1934	Hollywood on Parade No. B-6	Himself		
1934	The Hollywood Gad-About	Himself		
1934	Star Night at the Cocoanut Grove	Himself	Technicolor	
1935	Screen Snapshots Series 14, No. 8	Himself		
1935	La Fiesta de Santa Barbara	Himself	Technicolor	
1937	Lest We Forget	Himself	Cooper talking with Harry Carey about Will Rogers	
1940	Screen Snapshots: Seeing Hollywood	Himself	Cooper as a rodeo spectator	
1940	Screen Snapshots Series 19, No 6: Hollywood Recreations	Himself		
1941	Breakdowns of 1941	Himself		
1944	Memo for Joe	Himself	Cooper with the troops on his USO tour of the Pacific	
1949	Screen Snapshots: Motion Picture Mothers, Inc.	Himself		
1949	Snow Carnival	Narrator	Technicolor	
1955	Screen Snapshots: Hollywood Premiere	Himself		
1955	Hollywood Mothers	Himself		
1958	Screen Snapshots: Glamorous Hollywood	Himself		
1959	Premier Khrushchev in the USA	Himself		

=== Compilation films ===
Year	Title	Role	Notes	Ref
1939	Land of Liberty	Multiple	Historical events as shown in films (Note: Land of Liberty includes three film clips with Cooper from Operator 13, The Plainsman, and The Adventures of Marco Polo.)	

== Television ==
Year	Title	Role	Episode	Broadcast	Ref
1953	Toast of the Town	Himself	5.21	February 1, 1953	
1955	The Ed Sullivan Show	Himself	8.14	December 25, 1955	
1956	Cinépanorama	Himself	9	December 9, 1956	
1957	Cinépanorama	Himself	15	May 16, 1957	
1957	The Ed Sullivan Show	Himself	9.41	July 7, 1957	
1958	Wide Wide World	Himself	3.20	June 6, 1958	
1958	The Jack Benny Program	Himself	95	September 21, 1958	
1959	The Perry Como Show	Himself	—	February 27, 1959	
1959	What's My Line?	Himself	487	October 18, 1959	
1961	Project 20: The Real West	Host and narrator	20	March 29, 1961	

== Radio appearances ==
Year	Program	Episode	Ref
1937	Lux Radio Theatre	Mr. Deeds Goes to Town	
