= Sarumba =

1950 film

- Directed by: Marion Gering
- Written by: Jay Victor
- Produced by: Marion Gering; George P. Quigley; Julian Roffman
- Starring: Michael Whalen; Doris Dowling; Tommy Wonder
- Cinematography: Don Malkames
- Production company: Parmar Pictures
- Distributed by: Eagle-Lion Films
- Release date: January 1950
- Running time: 65 minutes
- Country: United States
- Language: English

Sarumba is a 1950 American musical drama film directed by Marion Gering and starring Michael Whalen, Doris Dowling and Tommy Wonder. As of 1949 the film was reported to be owned outright by Walter Gould.

== Cast ==
- Michael Whalen as Señor Valdez
- Doris Dowling as Hildita
- Tommy Wonder as Joe Thomas
- Dee Tatum as Maria
- Rodriguez Molina as Rodriguez
- Shelia Garret as Helen
- Manuel Folgoso as The Beggar
- Red Davis as Manager, La Paloma
- Ira Wolfer as Sailor
- John D. Bonin as Sailor
- Collins Hay as Sailor
- Laurette Campeau as Laurie

== Bibliography ==
- Darby, William. Masters of Lens and Light: A Checklist of Major Cinematographers and Their Feature Films. Scarecrow Press, 1991.
