= Pearling in Bangladesh =

Harvesting and farming of pearls practiced in Bangladesh

Pearling in Bangladesh has existed for centuries. Bangladesh is famous for natural pink pearls, locally known as “mukta”. They are collected from a species of freshwater mussels which are found in abundance in inland bodies of water such as lakes, rivers, ponds and dams.

Pearl farming takes place mainly in the southeastern region of the country, in an area stretching from Comilla District to the coastal Cox's Bazar District. The port city of Chittagong is a historic center of the pearl trade. Bengali river gypsies, people who live in houseboats, are traditionally engaged in pearl farming.

Bangladeshi pearl production is small compared to other major producers. The domestic jewelry industry is focused on gold and silver.

== See also ==
- Pearling in Western Australia
- Pearl farming in China
