= Ama (diving) =

Japanese pearl divers

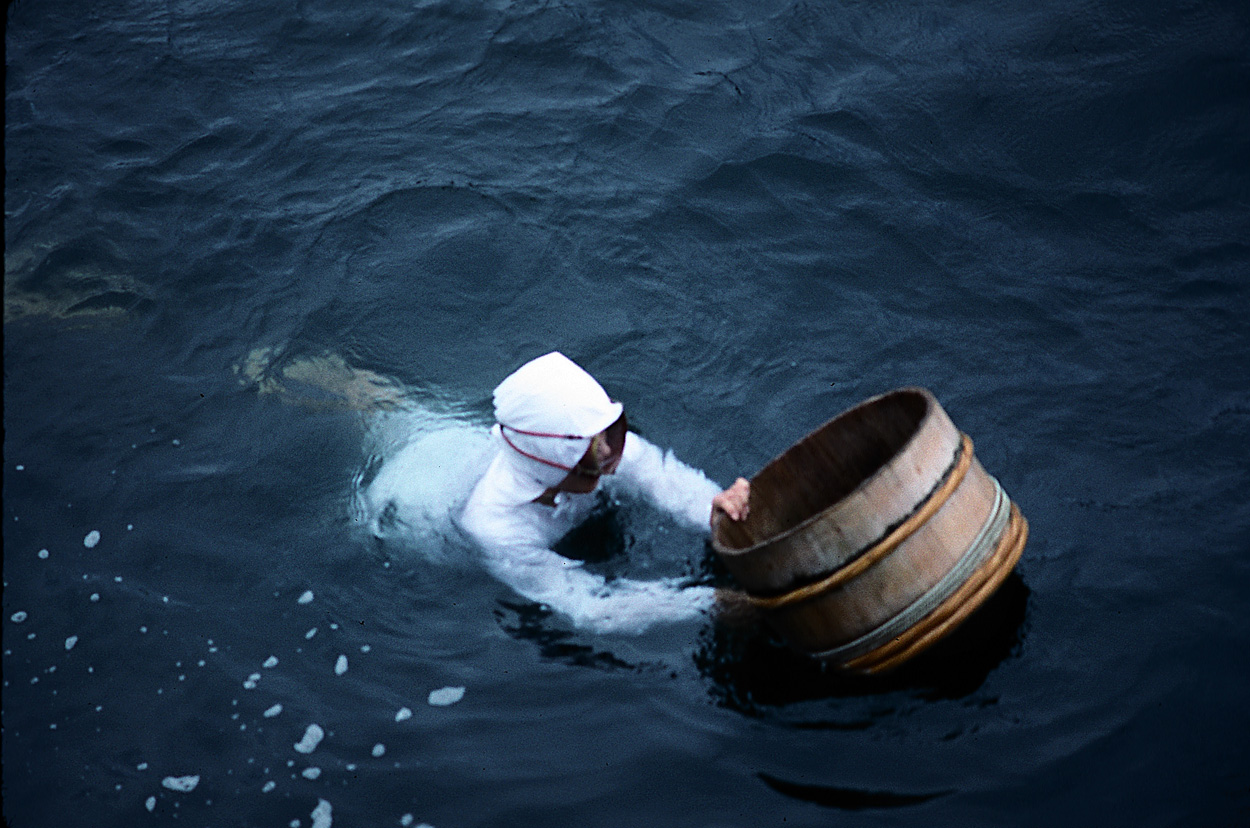
An ama diver.

Ama (海女, "sea women") are Japanese divers famous for collecting pearls, though traditionally their main catch is seafood. The vast majority of ama are women.

== Terminology ==
There are several sea occupations that are pronounced "ama" and several words that refer to sea occupation.

- ama (海女) – a sea-diving fisherwoman
- ama (海士) – a sea-diving fisherman
- ama (海人), kaijin (海人) – a sea-diving fisherperson of either gender
- uminchu (海人) – a sea fisherperson of either gender in Okinawan

While one definition of ama specifically refers to divers, another definition refers to fisherpersons in general.

== History ==
Japanese tradition holds that the practice of ama may be 2,000 years old.

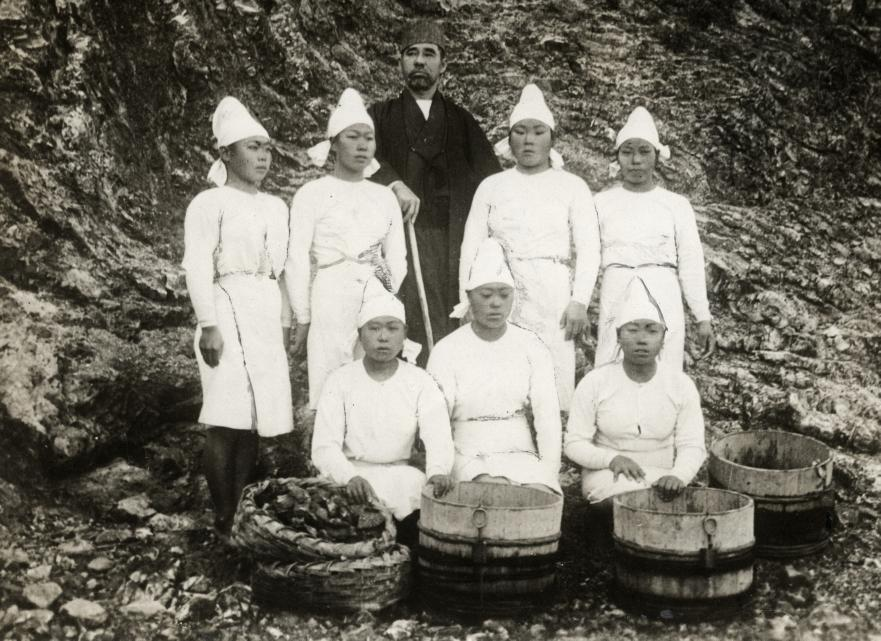
Pearl divers in white uniforms, 1921

Records of female pearl divers, or ama, date back as early as AD 927 in Japan's Heian period. Early ama were known to dive for seafood and were honored with the task of retrieving abalone for shrines and emperors. Ama traditionally wear white, as the colour represents purity and also to possibly ward off sharks. Traditionally and even as recently as the 1960s, ama dived wearing only a loincloth, but in the 20th century, the divers adopted an all-white sheer diving uniform in order to be more presentable while diving. Even in modern times, ama dive without scuba gear or air tanks, making them a traditional sort of freediver.

Pearl diving ama were considered rare in the early years of diving. However, Mikimoto Kōkichi's discovery and production of the cultured pearl in 1893 produced a great demand for ama. He established the Mikimoto Pearl Island in Toba and used the ama's findings to grow his business internationally. Nowadays, the pearl-diving ama are viewed as a tourist attraction at Mikimoto Pearl Island. The number of ama continue to dwindle as this ancient technique becomes less and less practiced, due to disinterest in the new generation of women and the dwindling demand for their activity. In the 1940s, 6,000 ama were reported active along the coasts of Japan, while today ama practice at numbers more along the scale of 60 or 70 divers in a generation.

== Activities ==
Women began diving as ama as early as 12 and 13 years old, taught by elder ama. Despite their early start, divers are known to be active well into their 70s, with extreme examples of ama divers in their 90s. In Japan, women were considered to be superior divers due to the distribution of their fat and their ability to hold their breath. The garments of the ama have changed throughout time, from the original loincloth to the white sheer garbs and eventually to the modern diving wetsuit.

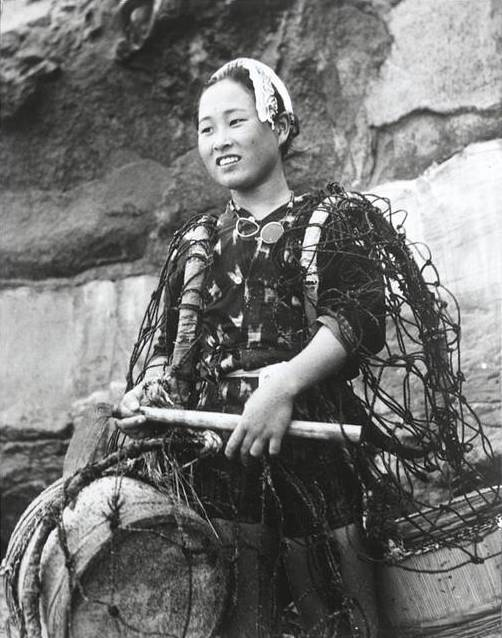
Pearl diver with headscarf, 1935

Duty and superstition mark the world of the ama. One traditional article of clothing that has stood the test of time is the headscarf. The headscarves are adorned with symbols such as the star-shaped seiman and the douman ("Monk's amulet"), which have the function of bringing luck to the diver and warding off evil. The ama are also known to create small shrines near their diving location where they will visit after diving in order to thank the gods for their safe return.

The ama were expected to endure harsh conditions while diving, such as freezing temperatures and great pressures from the depths of the sea. Through the practice, many ama were noted to lose weight during the months of diving seasons. Ama practiced a breathing technique in which the divers would release air in a long whistle once they resurfaced from a dive. This whistling became a defining characteristic of the ama, as this technique is unique to them.

== In culture ==
- James Bond travels to Japan in the novel You Only Live Twice. He meets and becomes involved with ama Kissy Suzuki. The character was also portrayed in the film version.
- The NHK morning television drama Amachan centers on a high school girl in the Tohoku region who initially sets out to become an ama diver.
- The Dream of the Fisherman's Wife, an 1814 woodblock print by Japanese artist Hokusai, depicts a young ama diver entwined sexually with a pair of octopuses.
- Ama Girls, a 1958 documentary film.
- Amanchu! is a Japanese manga series, later adapted into an anime. Its name is a longer version of the word 'ama', and its subject matter involves female divers.
- Ama-San, a 2016 documentary film by Portuguese director Cláudia Varejão, that follows the daily life of three Japanese women who have been diving together, for 30 years, in a small fishing village on the Shima Peninsula.
- Ama: Women of the Sea, an award-winning 2019 documentary film by British-Japanese filmmaker Georgie Yukiko Donovan, explores the last of Japan's 'women of the sea' and their fight to preserve their 3,000 year old way of life. She was one of five filmmakers awarded a grant of £20,000 to make the film, as part of the Female Film Force, an initiative created to actively address the gender imbalance within the film industry.
- Tampopo, a 1985 dramatic comedy film by Jûzô Itami includes a series of vignettes about the erotic and cinematic passions of a gangster in a white suit and his moll, one of which is a reminiscence about eating a fresh oyster from the hand of an ama girl at the seashore.
- Ama no Shima, a photography exhibition and eponym book made after the work of photographer Kusukazu Uraguchi. Using the first Nikonos camera released, Uraguchi documented the daily life of the Ama community in the Shima region until the 1980s. His works were displayed in France and the Netherlands.
- Violated Paradise, a 1963 film by Marion Gering, presented as a cultural documentary. The film picture a modern geisha traveling through Japan trying to find a job as entertainer, and who ends up by finding love and a job as ama.
- Paranormasight: The Mermaid's Curse, a 2026 video game, features Ama divers as a major plot point.

== See also ==
- Haenyeo – Female occupational divers in the Korean province of Jeju
- Skandalopetra diving – Freediving using a stone weight at the end of a rope to the surface
