= A. G. Allen =

American minstrel show promoter and director

Albert George Allen (c. 1864 – December 27, 1926) was an American promoter and director of minstrel shows. His tent shows, billed under various names including A. G. Allen's New Orleans Minstrels and A. G. Allen's Big Minstrel Show, toured between 1899 and the late 1920s, and were prominent and influential in the Black Vaudeville tradition.

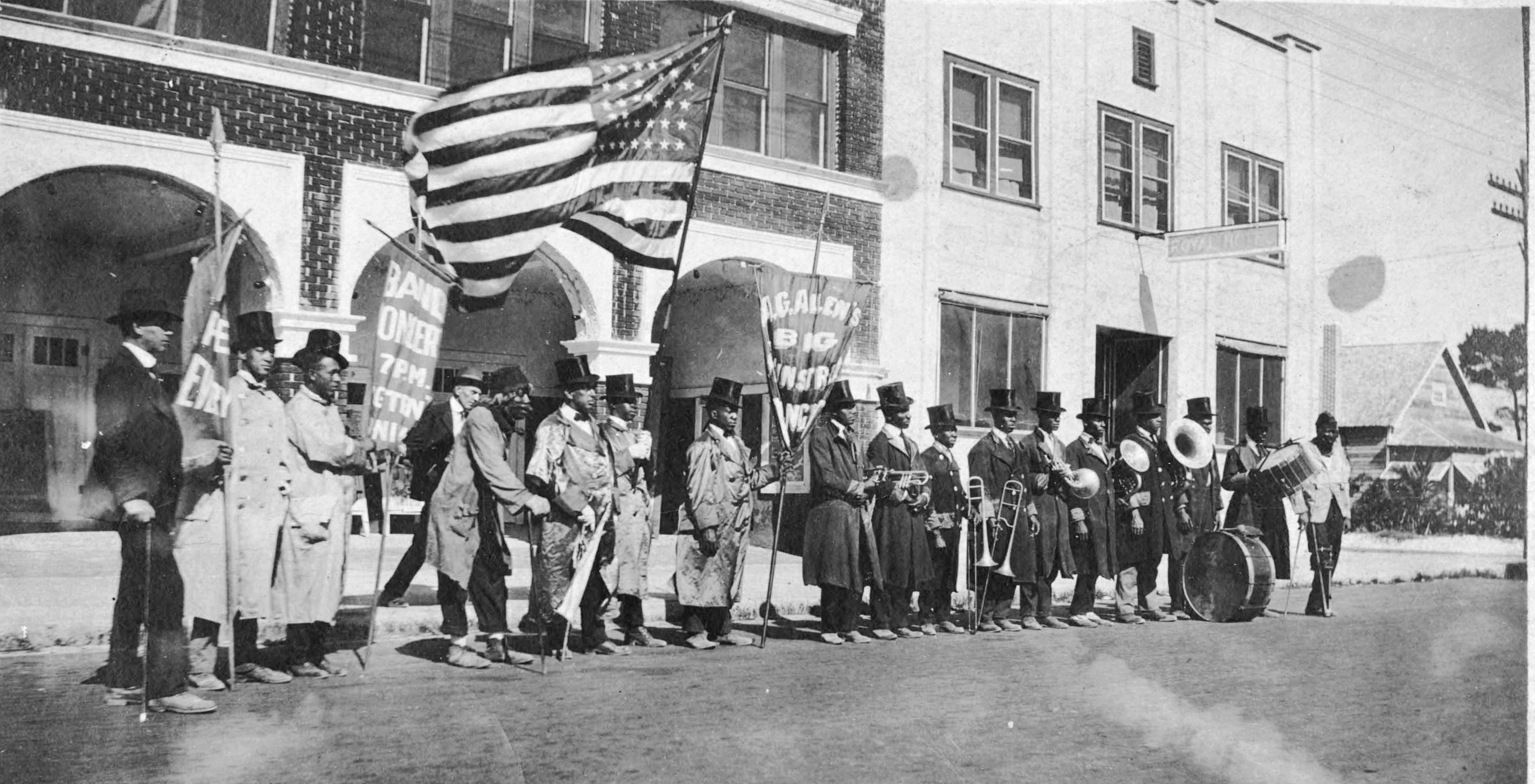
A. G. Allen's Big Minstrel Show performers outside Royal Hotel, c. 1910

== Biography ==
Allen was born in Zanesville, Ohio, and attended Denison University in Granville. Though his early business involvement is unknown, in the late 1890s he set up a partnership with George W. Quine (and initially John H. Oaks or Oakes) to set up a traveling minstrel show, comprising African Americans though Allen and his partners were themselves white. Allen was the General Director and gave his name to the show, with Quine as General Manager. With a roster of about 60 people, the show made its first appearance in Chicago in May 1899, and then toured widely in the Midwest and Southern States. The organisation described itself as the "Originators of Tented Minstrelsy" and, according to historians Lynn Abbott and Doug Seroff, "helped set the course for African American minstrel companies in the South, traveling by rail and showing under canvas". Allen himself was described, apparently in error, as "one of the most successful black promoters of minstrel theater in the United States".

The shows featured a band led by cornetist J. H. McCamon, playing music "from classical to ragtime". Other performers included blackface comedians, dancers, and "coon shouters", many of whom were women. In 1906 the troupe reverted to an all-male roster, but with some female impersonators; female performers were reinstated in 1914. After over 15 years of touring successfully, the organisation fractured by the end of 1914, when McCamon left, followed by Quine. Initially, Allen continued to manage the show, with J. Elmer Moore as bandleader. Quine returned in 1917, but the following year the organisation was taken over by J. W. Brownlee. In 1919, Allen formed a new traveling show, Allen's Minstrels, which included dancer Eddie "Peg" Lightfoot, and, from 1922, comedian Dewey Markham.

Allen later worked for the North Carolina Poster Advertising Association. He died from heart disease in 1926, at his home in Fayetteville, North Carolina. The touring company continued under his name for several years in the late 1920s, latterly under the management of E. S. Winstead.
