= Pearl hunting =

Collecting pearls from wild molluscs

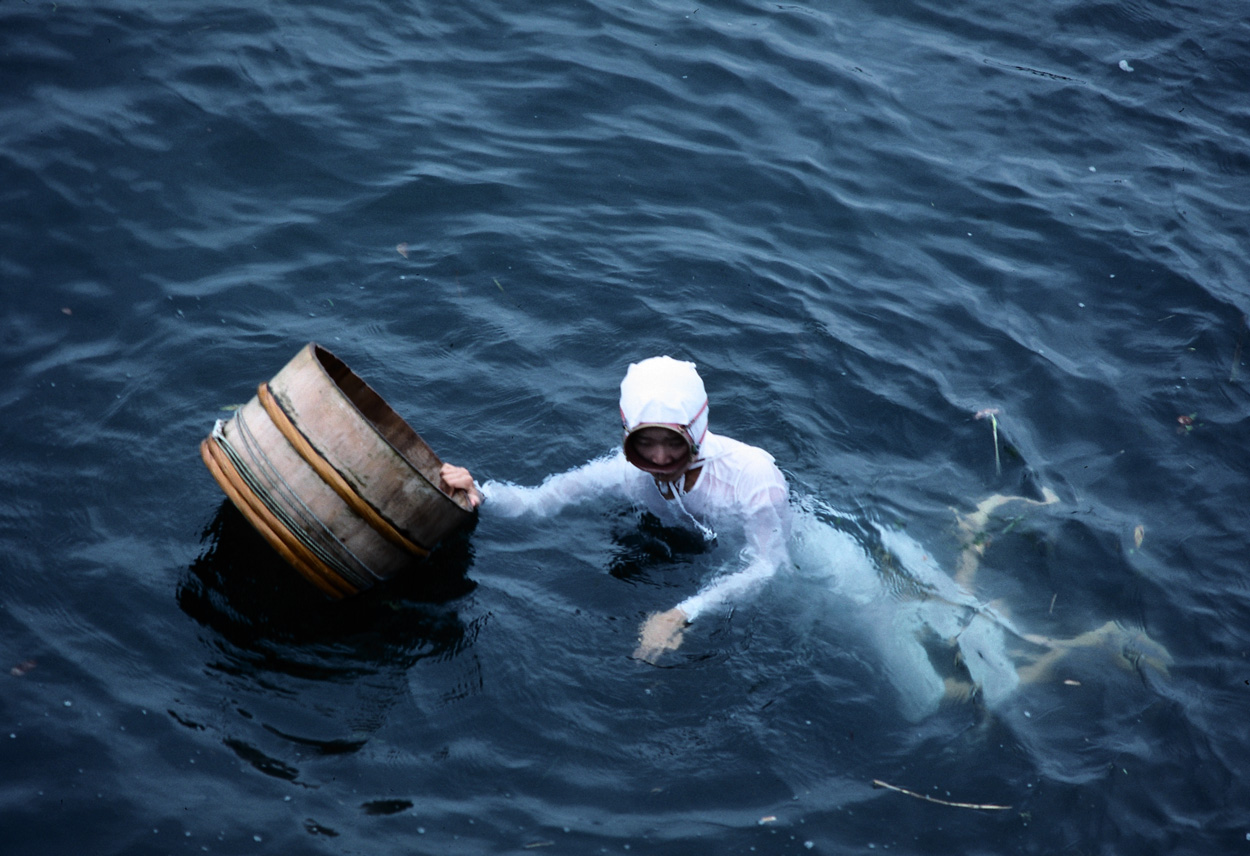
An ama pearl diver in Japan

Pearl hunting, also known as pearl fishing or pearling, is the activity of recovering or attempting to recover pearls from wild molluscs, usually oysters or mussels, in the sea or freshwater. Pearl hunting was prevalent in India and Japan for thousands of years. On the northern and north-western coast of Western Australia pearl diving began in the 1850s, and started in the Torres Strait Islands in the 1860s, where the term also covers diving for nacre or mother of pearl found in what were known as pearl shells.

In most cases the pearl-bearing molluscs live at depths where they are not manually accessible from the surface, and diving or the use of some form of tool is needed to reach them. Historically the molluscs were retrieved by freediving, a technique where the diver descends to the bottom, collects what they can, and surfaces on a single breath. The diving mask improved the ability of the diver to see while underwater. When the surface-supplied diving helmet became available for underwater work, it was also applied to the task of pearl hunting, and the associated activity of collecting pearl shell as a raw material for the manufacture of buttons, inlays and other decorative work. The surface supplied diving helmet greatly extended the time the diver could stay at depth, and introduced the previously unfamiliar hazards of barotrauma of ascent and decompression sickness.

== History ==
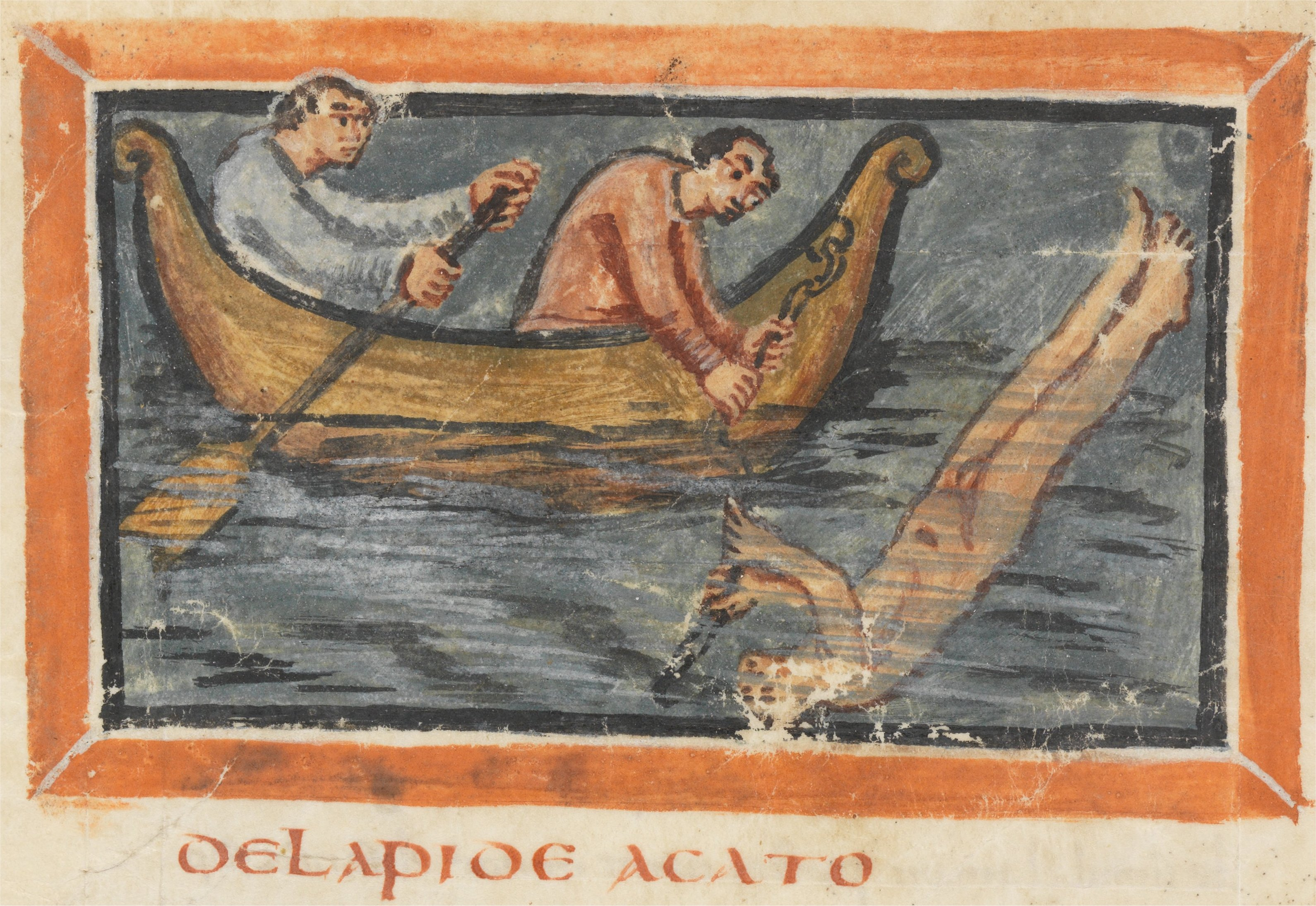
9th century drawing of a pearl diver

Before the beginning of the 20th century, the only means of obtaining pearls was by manually gathering very large numbers of pearl oysters or mussels from the ocean floor or lake or river bottom. The bivalves were then brought to the surface, opened, and the tissues searched. More than a ton were searched to find at least 3–4 quality beads.

To find enough pearl oysters, free-divers were often forced to descend to depths of over 100 feet on a single breath, exposing them to the dangers of hostile creatures, waves, eye damage, and drowning, often as a result of shallow water blackout on resurfacing. Because of the difficulty of diving and the unpredictable nature of natural pearl growth in pearl oysters, pearls of the time were extremely rare and of varying quality.

=== Americas ===
In a similar manner as in Asia, Native Americans harvested freshwater pearls from lakes and rivers like the Ohio, Tennessee, and Mississippi, while others successfully retrieved marine pearls from the Caribbean and waters along the coasts of Central and South America.

In the time of colonial slavery in northern South America (off the northern coasts of modern Colombia and Venezuela), slaves were used as pearl divers. A diver's career was often short-lived because the waters being searched were known to be shark-infested, resulting in frequent attacks on divers. A slave who discovered a great pearl could sometimes purchase his freedom.

The Great Depression in the United States in the 1930s made it hard to get good prices for pearl shell. The natural pearls found from harvested oysters were a rare bonus for the divers. Many fabulous specimens were found over the years. By the 1930s, over-harvesting had severely depleted the oyster beds. The US government was forced to strictly regulate the harvest to prevent the oysters from becoming extinct, and the Mexican government banned all pearl harvesting from 1942 to 1963.

Pearl diving in the Ohio and Tennessee rivers of the United States still exists today.

==== Colonial Latin America ====
During the first half of the sixteenth century, Spaniards discovered the extensive pearl oyster beds that existed on the Caribbean coast of Venezuela, particularly in the vicinity of Margarita Island. Indigenous slavery was easy to establish in this area because it had not yet been outlawed; therefore, indigenous peoples were captured and often forced to work as pearl divers. Since violence could not protect the efficiency of the slave trade, coastal chieftains established a ransoming system known as the "rescate" system.

As this system continued to grow, more and more oyster beds were discovered along the Latin American coast, including near Riohacha on Colombia's Guajira Peninsula. However, due to over-exploitation of both indigenous labor and the oyster beds, the Spanish pearl economy soon plummeted. By 1540, previous Spanish settlements along the coast had been abandoned as the Spanish looked elsewhere for more labor and newer markets. The pearl industry was partially revived in the late sixteenth century when Spaniards replaced indigenous labor with African slave labor.

Oyster harvesting methods remained much the same along the coast and varied depending on the divers' conditions, the region's topography, and a Spanish master's work demands.

===== Venezuela =====
On Margarita Island, small zones were inspected in advance by the divers, who relied on breath-hold endurance to dive and resurface. Once those small zones had been depleted of their oysters, the men on the boat – which usually included a dozen divers, a Spanish navigator, a diving chief, oarsmen, and a foreman – moved on to the next oyster bed. To retrieve the pearls, the divers carried a small net that had one end tied to the boat and the other end tied to the fishing net. The shells that they extracted were usually placed in this basket, but for dives of greater depth, the divers also had to wear stones tied to their bodies as they submerged into the ocean. The stones acted as a ballast until they resurfaced, where the divers then untied the stones from their bodies. The divers would receive a slight break to eat and rest and continue this work until sundown, where they all presented their catch to the foreman, return to the ranchería to have some dinner, and then open the oyster shells.

The divers were locked in their quarters at night by the Spaniards, who believed that if the divers (who were mostly male) compromised their chastity, they would not be able to submerge but rather float on the water. The divers who either had a small catch or rebelled were beaten with whips and tied in shackles. The working day lasted from dawn till dusk and being underwater, along with bruises, could affect the health of some divers. Furthermore, it is well known that the coastal waters were often infested with sharks, so shark attacks were quite frequent as well. As the fisheries continued to diminish, slaves hid some of the valuable pearls and exchanged them for clothing with their bosses.

On Cubagua, another Venezuelan island, the Spaniards used natives as slave labor in their initial attempts to establish a thriving pearl market in this area. Indians, especially those from Lucayo in the Bahamas, were taken as slaves to Cubagua since their diving skills and swimming capabilities were known to be superb. Likewise, the Spaniards began to import African slaves as the indigenous populations died off from disease and over-exploitation and Africans became so preferred by the Spanish over indigenous labor that a royal decree of 1558 decreed that only Africans (and no natives) should be used for pearl diving. Like other pearl diving groups controlled by the Spanish, the pearl divers could be treated harshly based on their daily pearl retrieval. Unlike the other pearl diving groups, however, the divers on Cubagua were marked by a hot iron on their face and arms with the letter "C," which some scholars argue stood for Cubagua.

The pearl diving process in Cubagua varied slightly from other Spanish pearl diving practices. Here, there were six divers per boat and divers worked together in pairs to collect the pearls. These pearl divers used small pouches tied to their necks to collect the oysters from the sea bottom. Some scholars have reported that because of the climate in Cubagua, the heat would cause the oysters to open themselves, making the pearl extraction process a bit simpler. Natives, unlike Africans, were given less rest time and could potentially be thrown off the boat or whipped to commence work sooner. Similar to slaves on Margarita Island, all pearl diving slaves were chained at night to prevent escape; in addition, deaths not only resulted from shark attacks, but also from hemorrhaging caused by rapid surfacing from the water and intestinal issues induced by constant reentry into cold water.

===== Panama =====
Diver groups in the Panamanian fisheries were larger than those on Margarita Island, usually comprising 18–20 divers. Instead of net bags, these divers surfaced with oysters under their armpits or even in their mouths, placing their catch in a cloth bag on board the ship. Each diver would continue to submerge until he was out of breath or extremely tired, but also after they had met their fixed quota for the day. Once the bags were full, the divers caught another breath and immediately began pearl extraction aboard the vessel, handing the pearls to the foreman who accounted for both imperfect and perfect pearls. Excess pearls were given to the divers who could sell them to the vessel owner at a just price; in contrast, if the divers did not meet their daily quota, they would either use their reserve pearls to fulfill the quota for the next day or write that amount of pearls into a debt account. Like the Venezuelan divers, the Panamanian divers also faced the danger of shark attacks, although they usually carried knives to defend themselves.

=== Asia ===
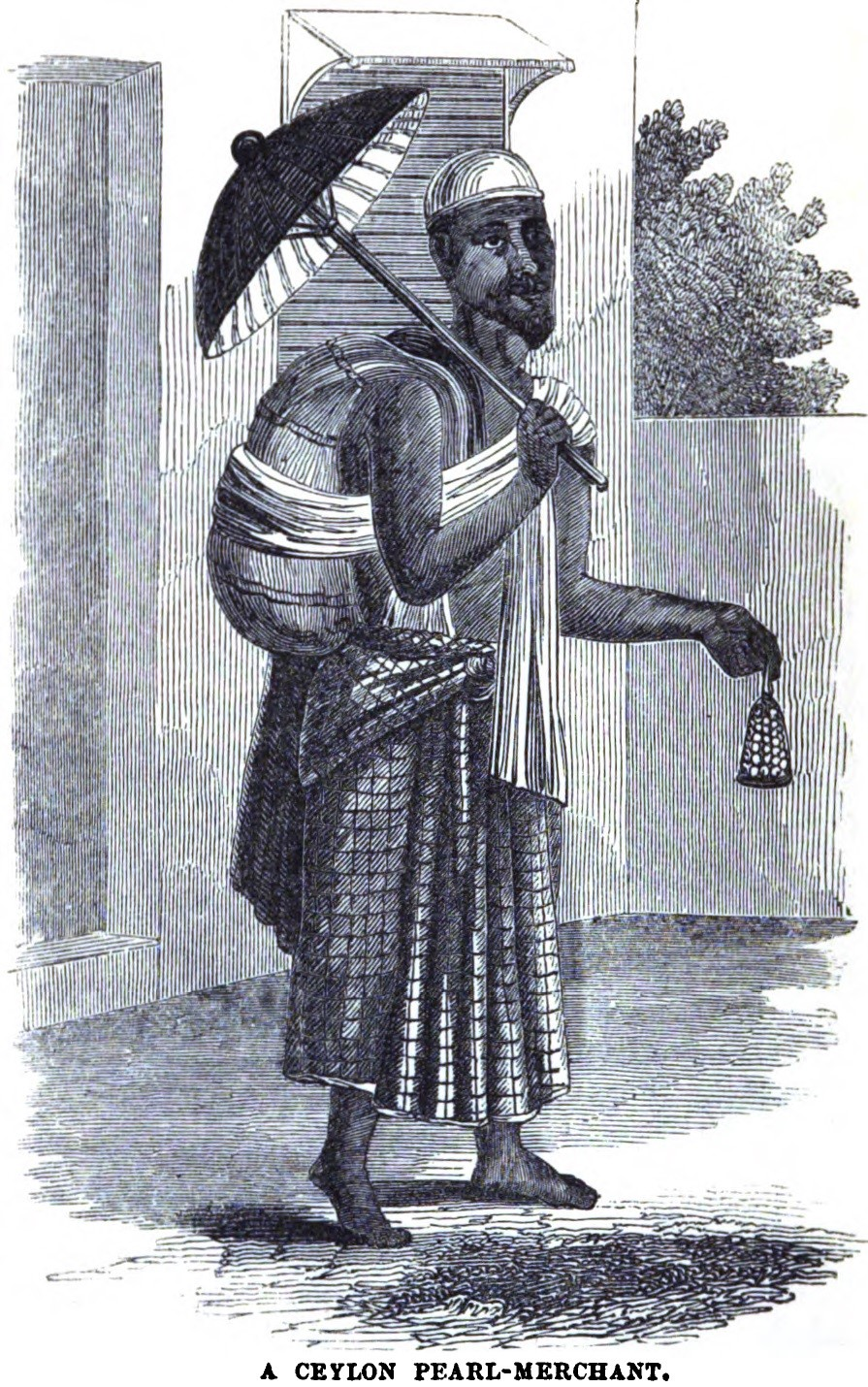
A Ceylon Pearl Merchant (p.108, 1849)

In Asia, some pearl oysters could be found on shoals at a depth of 5–7 feet (1.5–2.1 meters) from the surface, but more often divers had to go 40 feet (12 meters) or even up to 125 feet (38 meters) deep to find enough pearl oysters, and these deep dives were extremely hazardous to the divers. In the 19th century, divers in Asia had only very basic forms of technology to aid their survival at such depths. For example, in some areas they greased their bodies to conserve heat, put greased cotton in their ears, wore a tortoise-shell clip to close their nostrils, gripped a large object like a rock to descend without the wasteful effort of swimming down, and had a wide-mouthed basket or net to hold the oysters.

For thousands of years, most seawater pearls were retrieved by divers working in the Indian Ocean, in areas such as the Persian Gulf, the Red Sea, and in the Gulf of Mannar (between Sri Lanka and India). A fragment of Isidore of Charax's Parthian itinerary was preserved in Athenaeus's 3rd-century Sophists at Dinner, recording freediving for pearls around an island in the Persian Gulf.

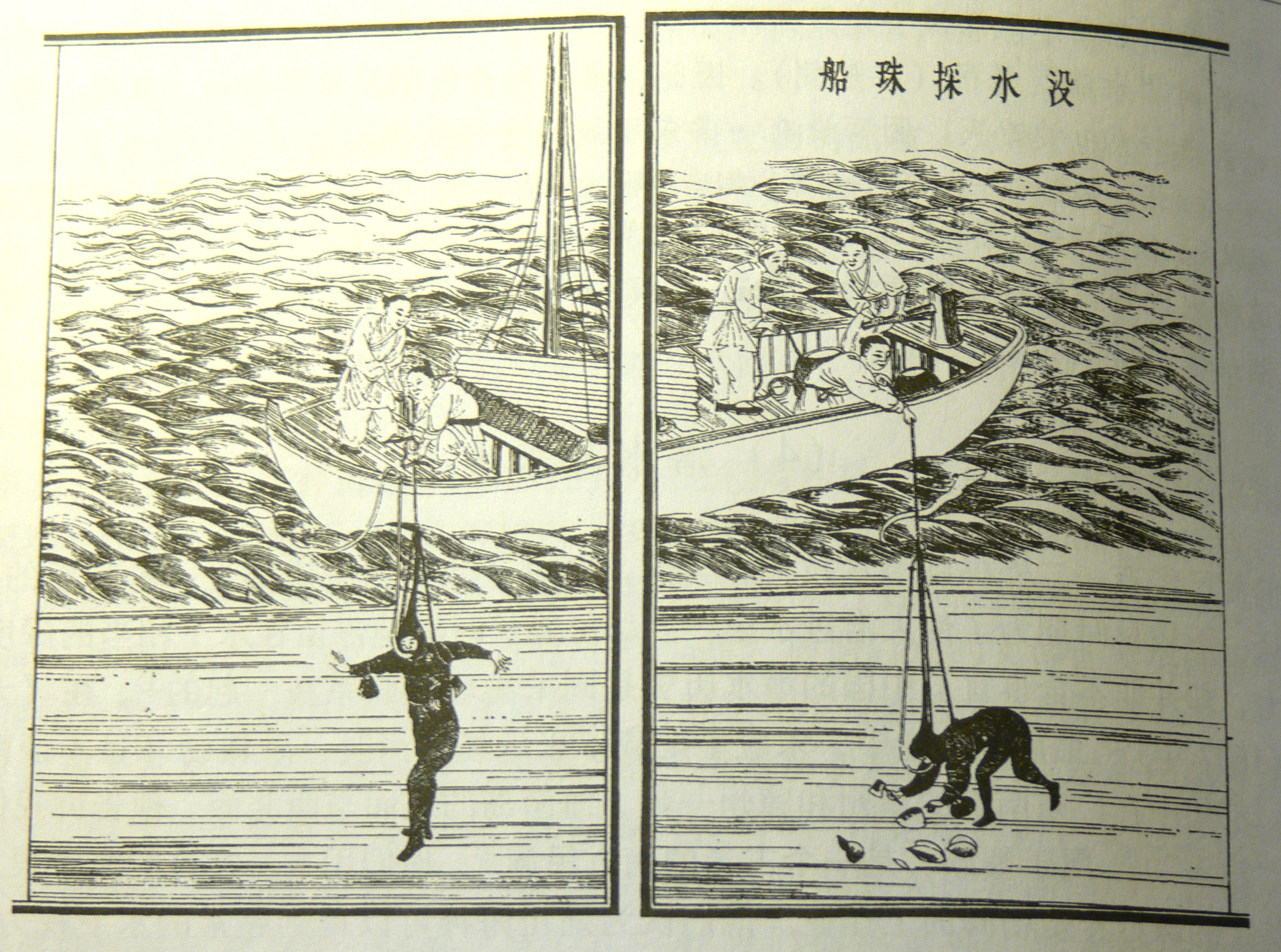
Woodblock illustration of a Chinese pearl-diving boat, Song Yingxing's 1637 Tiangong Kaiwu encyclopedia of technology

Pearl divers near the Philippines were also successful at harvesting large pearls, especially in the Sulu Archipelago. In fact, pearls from the Sulu Archipelago were considered the "finest of the world" which were found in "high bred" shells in deep, clear, and rapid tidal waters. At times, the largest pearls belonged by law to the sultan, and selling them could result in the death penalty for the seller. Nonetheless, many pearls made it out of the archipelago by stealth, ending up in the possession of the wealthiest families in Europe. Pearling was popular in Qatar, Bahrain, Kuwait, Japan, India and some areas in Persian Gulf countries. The Gulf of Mexico was particularly famous for pearling, which was originally found by the Spanish explorers.

==== Eastern Arabia and Persian Gulf ====
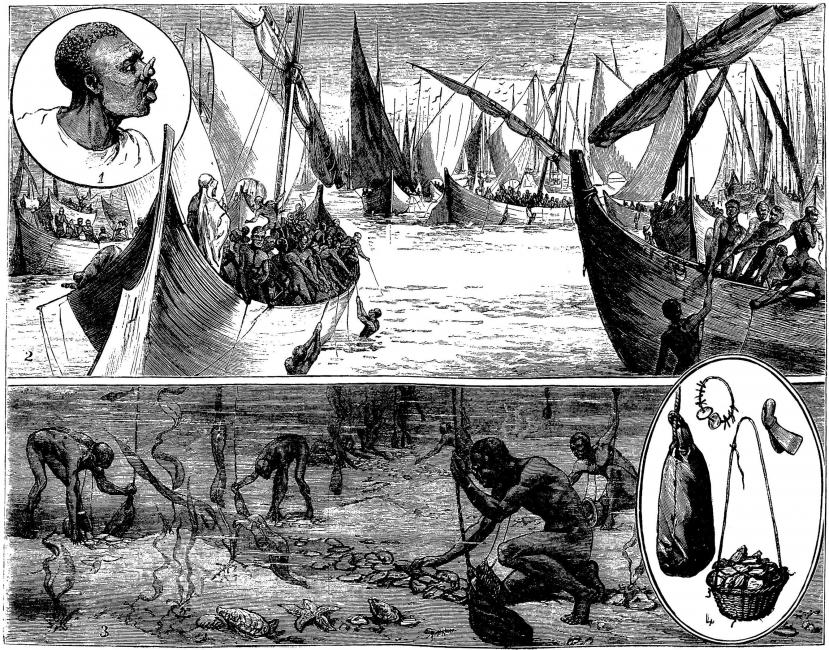
The Pearl Fishery in the Persian Gulf. Illustration for The Graphic, 1 October 1881. At the time, the pearl industry was dominated by slave labor.

Pearl hunting represented a cornerstone of Eastern Arabian economy, serving as a primary source of wealth generation and international trade. The industry's significance extended beyond mere economic value, fundamentally shaping social hierarchies and community organization in coastal settlements.

The shallow Persian Gulf produced many pearls, and the pearling industry flourished in Kuwait, UAE, and Qatar, with Bahrain producing the highest export. In the lower Gulf, the economic model was less centered on personal ornamentation and more on the pearls' ability to facilitate trade. They were exchanged for essential commodities such as high-quality dates, rice, and luxury items including Indian cloth and Persian nuts. In contrast to the affluent traders of the upper Gulf—such as those in Bahrain and Kuwait—merchants in the lower Gulf frequently experienced cycles of indebtedness due to the unpredictable fluctuations in the pearl market.

The extraction and profit realization cycle of pearl hunting, which could extend up to a year, necessitated advances and loans. Consequently, merchants, regardless of their financial standing, often retained a disproportionate share of the eventual profits. This dynamic compelled divers to supplement their income with alternative jobs such as fishing, trading, or other forms of hunting, thereby underlining the precarious nature of a livelihood dependent on pearls.

The financial risks inherent in pearl hunting were amplified by the lengthy period between extraction and sale. Market instabilities, marked by dramatic price fluctuations throughout the 19th and early 20th centuries, frequently led to cycles of debt for both merchants and divers. Economic downturns—exemplified by a depression in 1908—intensified these challenges, as even prosperous years could not sustain families solely through diving. High interest rates on borrowed funds further compounded the financial burdens, leaving many coastal communities vulnerable to economic distress. Over-fishing, regional and world wars, poor weather, problems with debt – all of these were the factors that had been driving the market into the mire. The merchants had been struggling for decades and the nakhudas, haulers and divers had been falling out over worsening conditions and poor yields for a very long time before the Great Depression of 1929.

The price for pearls increased throughout the nineteenth century, with the pearl trade expanding in this region. At this time, pearls from the Persian Gulf were being traded in Aleppo and Istanbul, and there is evidence that merchants would sail to India (particularly Bombay) to sell pearls. By the 1930s, there were a few traders traveling all the way to Paris to sell their pearls. In the early twentieth century, it was estimated that about a quarter of the population living in the Persian Gulf's littoral was involved with the pearl trade. In the Persian Gulf, the pearling industry was dominated by slave labor, and male slaves were used as pearl divers until the final abolition of slavery in the Gulf states in the period of 1937–1971.

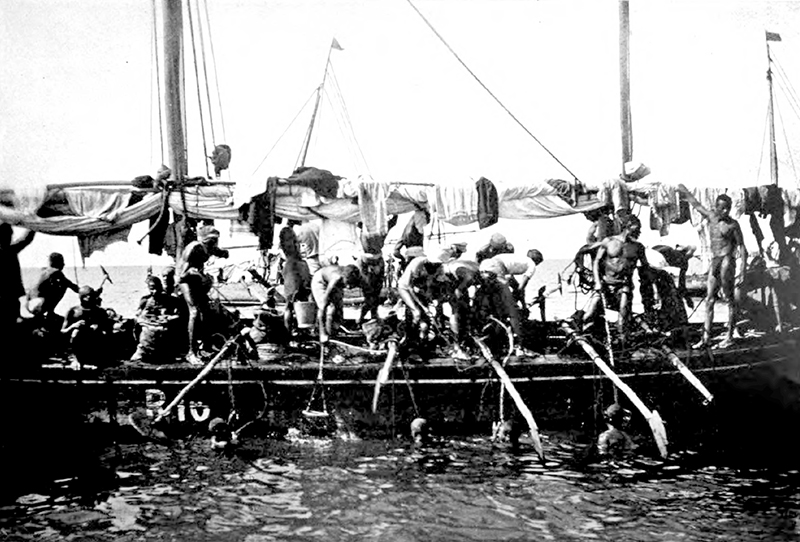
Pearl divers in the Persian Gulf at the beginning of 20th century.

The pearling industry in this region reached its zenith around 1912, "the Year of Superabundance." During periods of acute scarcity—such as the nutritional crises of the 1940s—local populations resorted to unconventional sustenance practices like the consumption of dried, salted pearl mollusk meat. By the 1950s, however, dependency on pearls was replaced by dependency on oil, as oil was discovered and the oil industry became the dominant economic trade.

The operation of pearl boats was characterized by a well-defined social hierarchy; roles on the vessels were allocated based on necessity rather than age alone, and included:

- Divers (ghaws): The primary agents of pearl extraction.
- Captains (nakhuda): Leaders, often the ship owner, responsible for navigation and overall operations.
- Haulers (seeb) and assistants (radheef, tabab): Personnel supporting the diving operations.
- Specialized roles: Such as singers (naham), cooks (tabbakh), religious scholars (mutuwa’a), bookkeepers (kuttab), shell openers (jallas), boatswains (wa’adi, dukkan), and helmsmen (mujaddami).

On larger ships, these roles were more specialized, whereas smaller vessels often necessitated that crew members assume multiple responsibilities. Apprentices, often starting as tabab between the ages of seven and fifteen, could ascend within the boat's hierarchy over the span of a few years or a decade. Profit sharing from pearl sales was pre-arranged and distributed according to factors such as crew debt and the captain's discretion, offering a mechanism for financial and social advancement despite the inherent uncertainties of the industry.

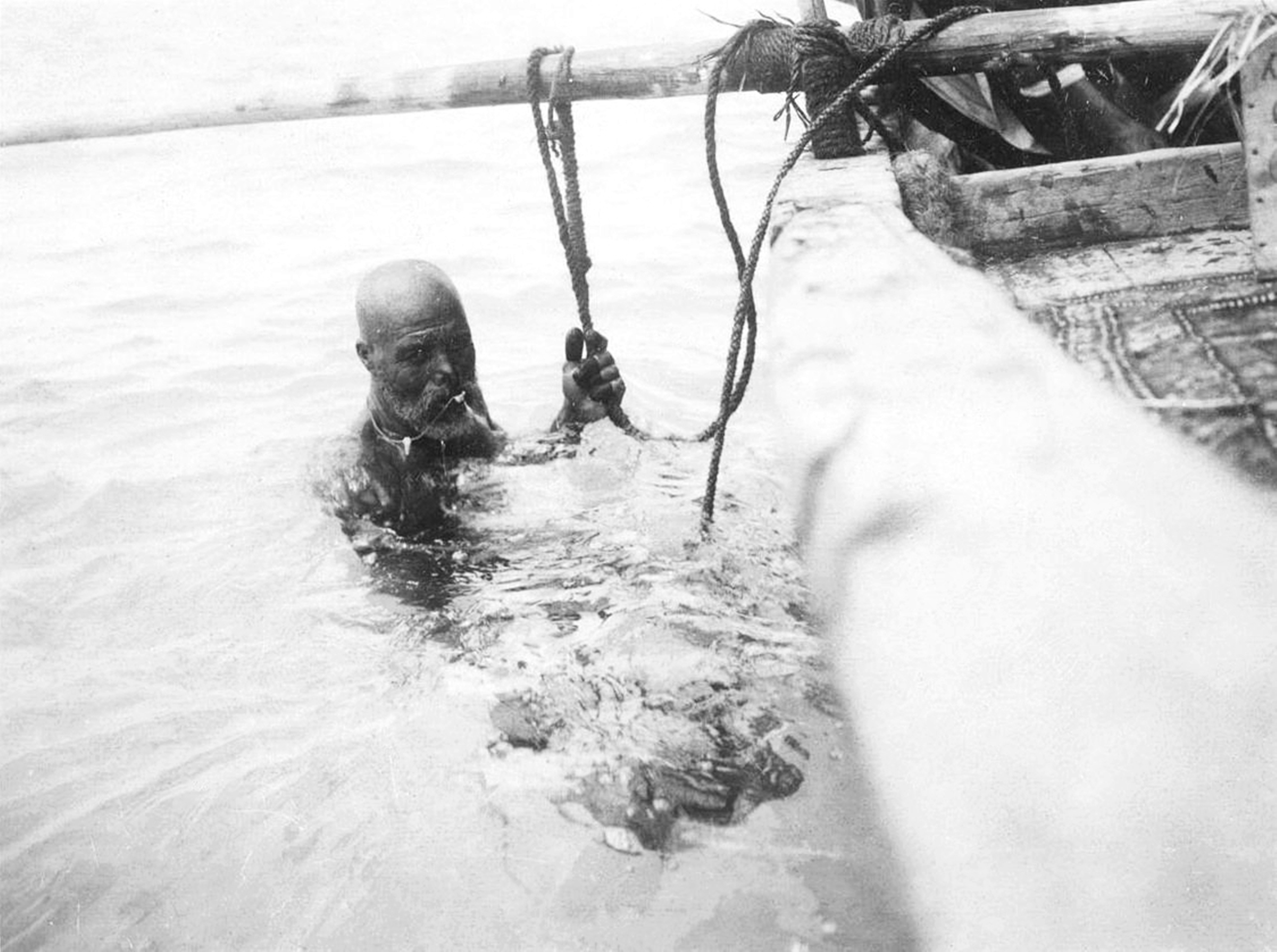
Pearl Hunter in Bahrain, 1911.

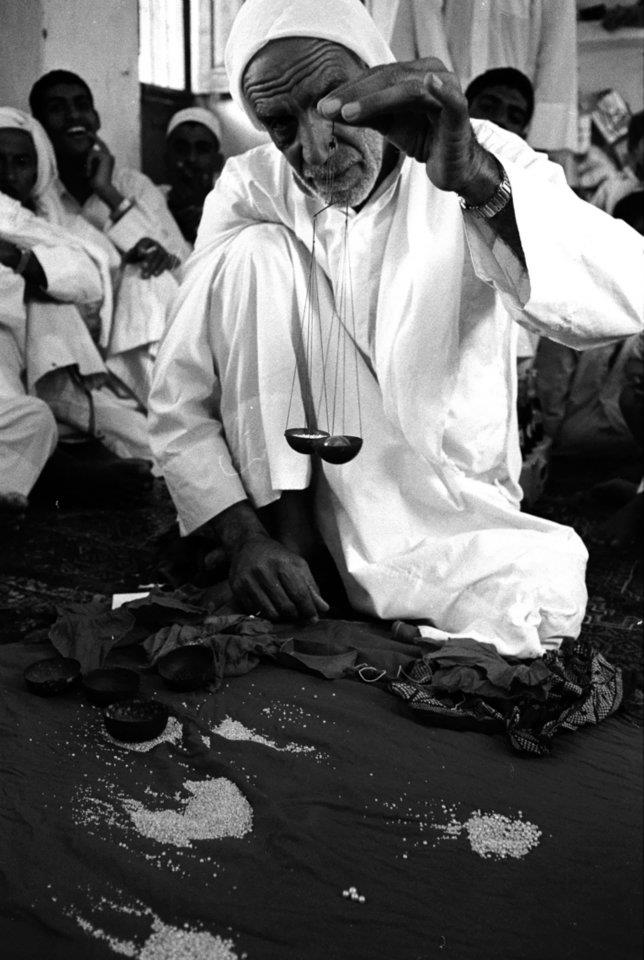
A merchant weighs pearls in Qatif, 1970s.

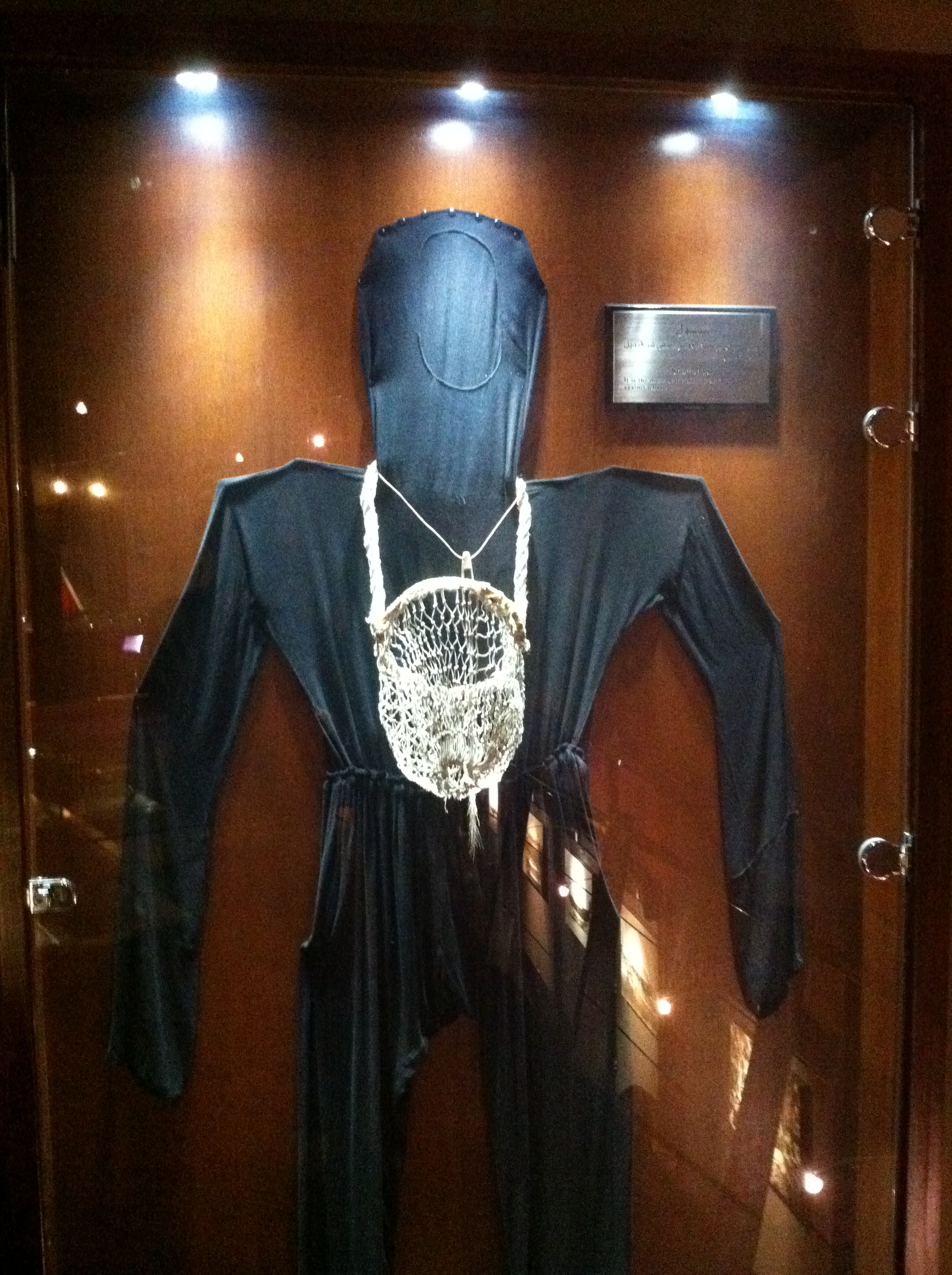
A piece of clothing used by Kuwaiti divers searching for pearls from the Maritime Museum in Kuwait City, Kuwait

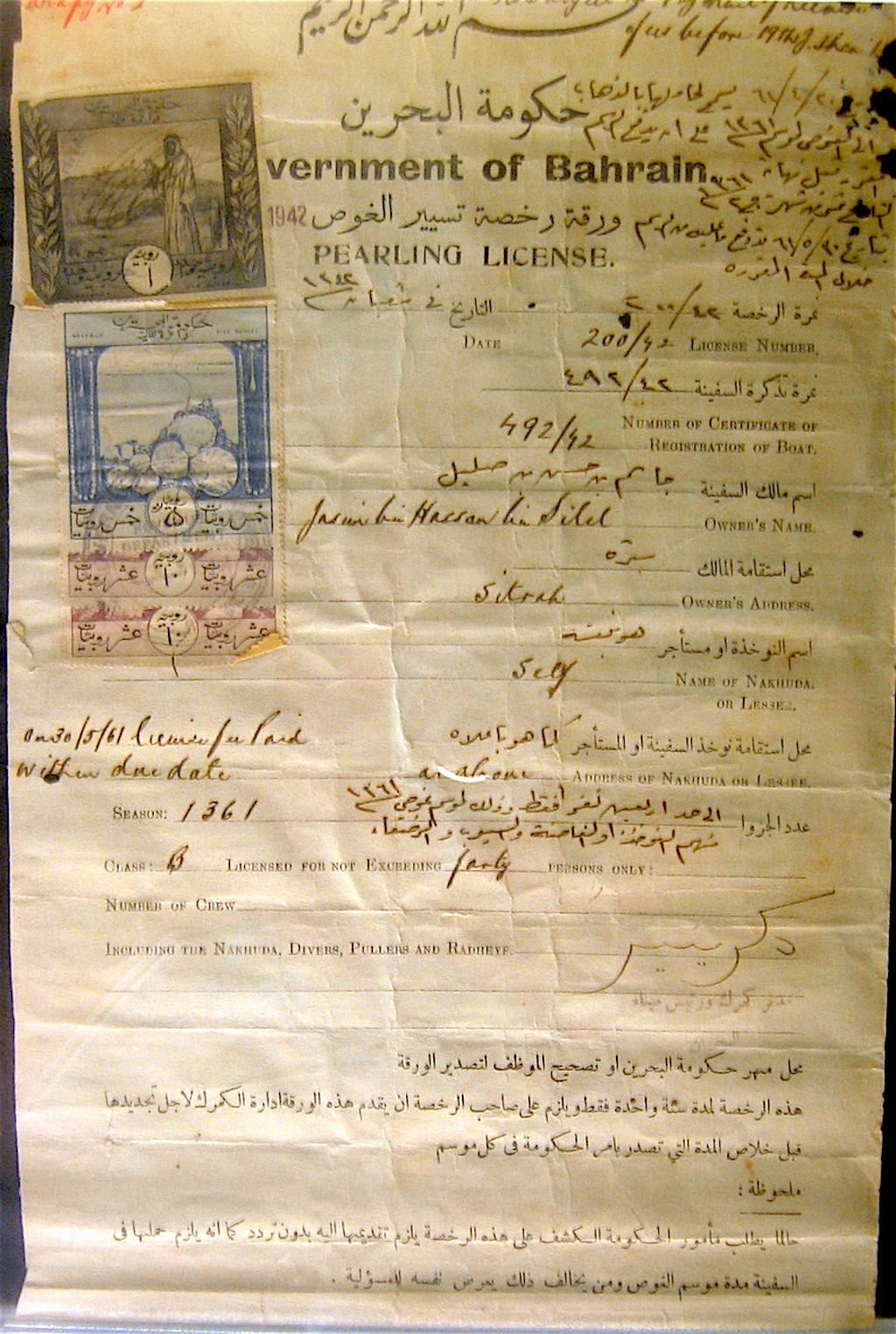
A pearling license in Bahrain from 1942.

=== Australia ===
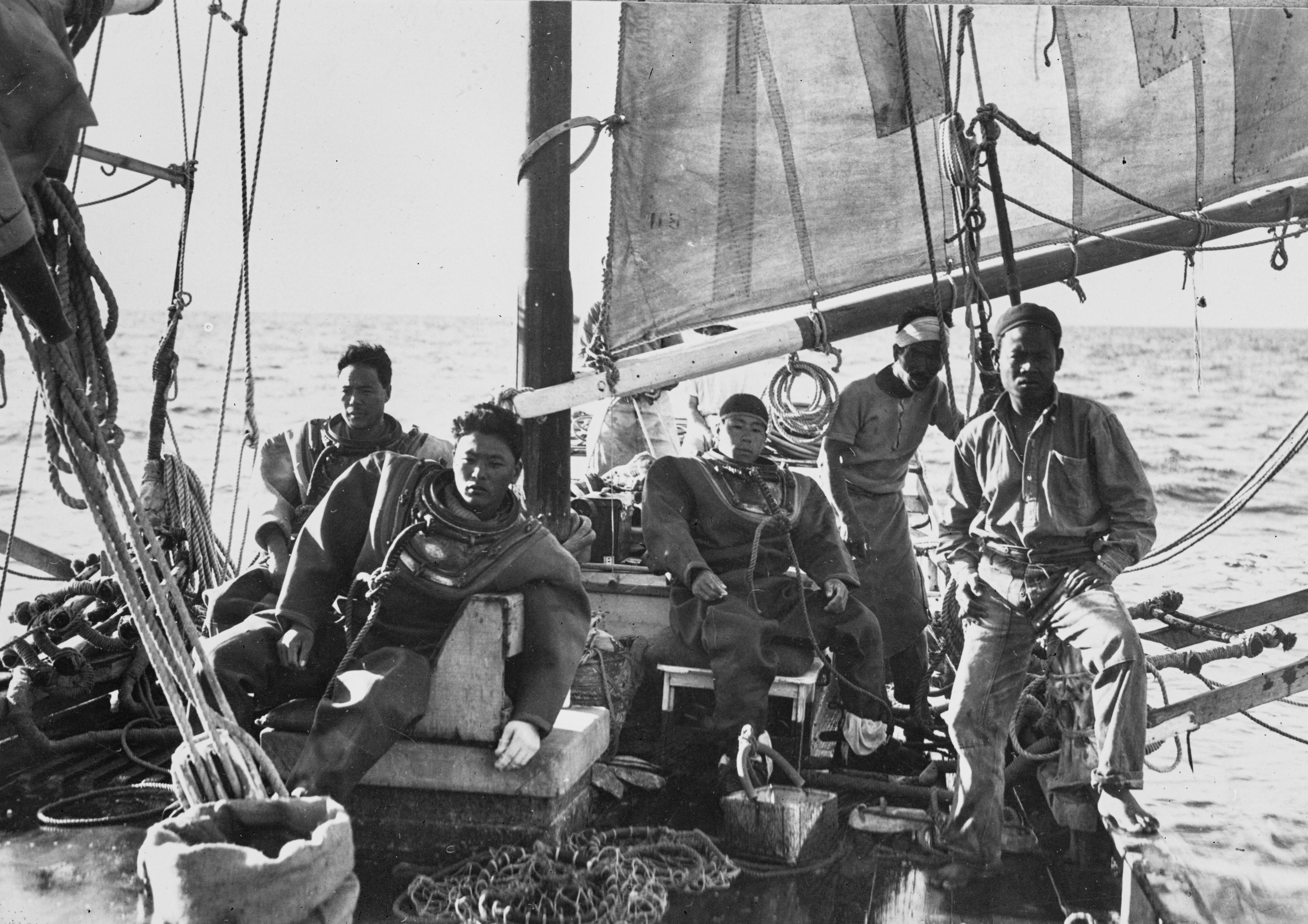
Pearl divers, Australia, 23 March 1939

Although harvesting of shells had long been practiced by Aboriginal Australians, pearl diving only began in the 1850s off the coast of Western Australia and the pearling industry remained strong until the advent of World War I, when the price of mother-of-pearl plummeted with the invention and expanded use of plastics for buttons and other articles previously made of shell.

In the 1870s, pearling began in the Torres Strait, off Far North Queensland. By the 1890s, pearling was the largest industry in the region, and had a huge impact on coastal Aboriginal Australians and Torres Strait Islander peoples. Because of the dangers of diving, almost no white people participated, and Asian, Pacific, and Indigenous Australians were used as cheap labor for the industry. Shells were the main aim for collection, and the whole industry was essentially a colonial one geared to procuring mother-of-pearl for sale to overseas markets for the making of buttons. As time went on and sources were depleted, divers were encouraged to dive deeper, making the enterprise even more dangerous. Divers experimented with the heavy diving suit, discarding the full diving suit and using the helmet and corselet only, which became standard practice until 1960. "Hookah" gear, tested to 48 fathoms (88 metres) in 1922, was considered unsuitable for the strong tides in these waters, and the later Scuba equipment did not supply enough air to spend the time required underwater and for decompression while surfacing

=== Europe ===
==== Scotland ====
Scotland is home to approximately half of the world's freshwater pearl mussels. Pearl hunting has been carried out in Scotland since the Roman era. Writings by Suetonius, the biographer of Julius Caesar, suggest that Julius Caesar's invasions of Britain in 55 BC and 54 BC were in part prompted by a desire to harvest Scotland's freshwater pearls. In 1621, the Kellie Pearl (or Kelly Pearl) – the largest freshwater pearl ever found in Scotland – was found in a tributary of the River Ythan in Aberdeenshire; it was presented to King James VI, who had it set in the Crown of Scotland. Extensive fishing from the 16th to 19th centuries saw a large decline in pearl mussel numbers, resulting in the industry declining. Rising water temperatures also reduced the mussel population. William "Bill" Abernethy (1925–2021) was credited as Scotland's last dedicated pearl fisherman; he found the 43.6-grain Abernethy pearl in the River Tay in 1967. 1998, legislation was passed making it illegal to fish for or to sell freshwater pearls in Scotland. As of 2003, there were 61 known breeding sites in Scotland.

== Present ==
Today, pearl diving has largely been supplanted by cultured pearl farms, which use a process widely popularized and promoted by Japanese entrepreneur Kōkichi Mikimoto. Particles implanted in the oyster encourage the formation of pearls and allow for more predictable production. Today's pearl industry produces billions of pearls every year. Ama divers still work, primarily now for the tourist industry.

== See also ==
- Ama (diving) – Japanese pearl divers – female Japanese divers
- Blackbirding – Coerced labour, mainly in the southeast Pacific
- Fijiri – East Arabian musical style – vocal music of the Gulf pearl diver
- Culture of Eastern Arabia
- Paravar – Maritime community in South India
- Pearl farming industry in China
- Pearling in Western Australia – Local aquaculture industry
- Zubarah – Ruined and deserted town in Al Shamal, Qatar – a Qatari pearl fishing and trading port in the 18th and 19th centuries

== Bibliography ==
- Al-Hijji, Yacoub Yusuf (2006). Kuwait and the Sea. A Brief Social and Economic History. Arabian Publishing. ISBN 978-0-9558894-4-8.
- al-Shamlan, Saif Marzooq (2001). Pearling in the Arabian Gulf. A Kuwaiti Memoir. The London Centre of Arab Studies. ISBN 1-900404-19-2.
- Bari, Hubert; Lam, David (2010). Pearls. SKIRA / Qatar Museums Authority. ISBN 978-99921-61-15-9. Especially chapter 4 p. 189-238 The Time of the Great Fisheries (1850–1940)
- Ganter, Regina (1994). The Pearl-Shellers of Torres Strait: Resource Use, Development and Decline, 1860s-1960s. Melbourne University Press. ISBN 0-522-84547-9.
- George Frederick Kunz: Book of the Pearl (G.F. Kunz was America's leading gemologist and worked for Tiffany's in the beginning of the 20th century)
