= Norman Borisoff =

American novelist

- Born: April 16, 1918
- Died: April 21, 2013 (aged 95)

Norman Borisoff (April 16, 1918 – April 21, 2013) was an American television writer, award-winning scriptwriter, and a young adult novelist.

== Filmography ==
Year	Title	Format	Role	Notes
1941	Murder with Music	Film	Screenplay	also known as Mistaken Identity
1947	Bread and Wine	Film	Story	International Film Foundation
1947	Artisans of Florence	Short documentary	Story	—
1950	The Titan: Story of Michelangelo	Documentary	Written by	—
1957	Castles and Castanets	Documentary	Writer	Henry Strauss Productions (30 minuest)
1958	Revolt in Hungary	TV movie	Written by	Twentieth century television program
1962	The Saint	TV series	Screenplay	2 episodes: "The Element of Doubt" (1-08 November 22, 192); "The Effete Angler" (1-09 November 29, 1962)
1963	Stop Train 349	Film	Dialogue	—
1963	The Kremlin	TV movie	Written by	also known as The Jarvis Collection: "The Kremlin"
1963; 1964	Espionage	TV series	Story	2 episodes: "To the Very End" (November 6, 1963); "Castles in Spain" (February 19, 1964)
1964	The Saint	TV series	Screenplay	2 episodes: "The Good Medicine" (2–21 February 6, 1964); "The Ever-Loving Spouse" (2–26 March 12, 1964)
1966	I Spy	TV series	Written by	2 episodes: "To Florence with Love: Part 1" and "2"
1966	Jericho	TV series	Written by	1 episode: "Panic in the Piazza"
1967	The F.B.I.	TV series	Story	1 episode: "Rope of Gold" (53-21 February 12, 1967)
1968	Judd, for the Defense	TV series	Written by	1 episode: "The Worst of Both Worlds" (25 March 15, 1968)
1970	Ironside	TV series	Written by	1 episode (season 3): "The Wrong Time, the Wrong Place" (3–18 [72] February 5, 1970)
1973	Screaming Skull	TV movie	Writer	—
1978	Starsky and Hutch	TV series	Story	1 episode: "The Heavyweight" (3–14)
1985	Rituals	TV series	Writer	—

== Books ==
- Nick the Waiter (1966)
- Carmen the Beautician (1967)
- Ned the Taxicab Driver (1967)
- Who's There (with Michal Heron; 1972)
- Don't Give Up (with Michal Heron; 1972)
- Walkie-Talkie Patrol (with Michal Heron; 1972)
- Unknown Adventures (with Michal Heron; 1972)
- Bird Seed & Lightning (with Michal Heron; 1972)
- You Might Even Like It (1973)
- Crazy George (1974)
- Lily, the Lovable Lion (1975)
- The Dropout (1975)
- Lily, the Lovable Lion (1975)
- Dangerous Fortune (1976)
- Starsky and Hutch: A matter of pride (with Robert Swanson; 1977)
- The Goof-up (1978)
- The Haunted House (with Tom Leigh; 1978)
- Easy Money (1981)
- Bewitched and Bewildered: A Spooky Love Story (1982)

== See also ==
- Daily Bruin
- List of The Saint episodes
- Man of the World
- Writers Guild of America Award for Television: Daytime Serials ("Search for Tomorrow" [1985])
