= Murder with Music =

- Original film poster
- Directed by: George P. Quigley
- Written by: Norman Borisoff (writer); Georges Friedland (story); Augustus Smith (writer); Victor Vicas (writer)
- Starring: See below
- Cinematography: John Visconti; George Webber
- Distributed by: Sack Amusements
- Release date: 1945
- Running time: 59 minutes
- Country: United States
- Language: English

Murder with Music is a 1948 American race film from Century Productions, produced and directed by George P. Quigley. The film used footage from an earlier 1940s race film Mistaken Identity, additional footage from which was re-used in the 1948 short subject Bob Howard's House Party. Sack Amusement Enterprises distributed the film.

== Plot ==
In a story told in flashbacks, a newspaper editor explains to a wannabe reporter why he doesn't want to hire any new reporters. The editor, a flirty singer, a reporter, an escaped convict, a nighclub manager and his wife, two bands, and a club piano player have roles in the action, which eventually leads to the murder of the piano player and offers many musical numbers and comedy skits in the meantime.

== Cast ==
- Bob Howard as Editor
- Milton Williams as Ted Simmons
- Nellie Hill as Lola
- Bill Dillard as Mike
- George Oliver as Hal Ford
- Ruth Cobbs as Mary Smith
- Ken Renard as Bill Smith
- Andrew Maize as Patrolman Jerry O'Hara
- Marjorie Oliver as Smith's Secretary
- Nobel (sic) Sissle and His Orchestra as Party Band
- Johnson & Johnson as Club Tap Dancers
- Pinky Williams as Lewis the club piano player
- Skippy Williams and His Band as Club Band
- Alston & Young as Club Comic Dancers

== Soundtrack ==
- "Geeshee" (Written by Sidney Easton and Augustus Smith)
- Bob Howard, accompanied by Noble Sissle and his Orchestra - "Too Late Baby" (Written by Sidney Easton and Augustus Smith)
- Noble Sissle, accompanied by his orchestra - "Hello Happiness" (Written by Sidney Easton and Augustus Smith)
- Skippy Williams and his band - "Jam Session" (Written by Skippy Williams)
- Noble Sissle and by his orchestra - "Running Around" (Written by Sidney Easton and Augustus Smith)
- Nellie Hill accompanied by Andrew Maize - "Can't Help It" (Written by Skippy Williams)
- Nellie Hill accompanied by Skippy Williams and his band - "Can't Help It" (reprise)
- Played on piano and danced by Johnson and Johnson - "That's the Cheese You Got To Squeeze"

== Reviews ==
John Howard Reid gave a highly unfavorable account of the movie's direction and editing.
