= Junction 88 =

1948 American film

Junction 88 is a 1948 American musical film, telling the story of an aspiring songwriter. It was directed by George P. Quigley. The film is part of the Smithsonian National Museum of African American History and Culture collection. The 16 mm film captured on acetate runs 50 minutes.

J. Augustus Smith and Herbert Junior wrote the songs.

== Cast ==
- Bob Howard
- Dewey "Pigmeat" Markham
- Noble Sissel
- Wyatt Clark as Buster
- Marie Cooke a Lolly
- Gus Smith as Pop
- Abbie Mitchell as Mom
- Artie Belle McGinty as Mrs. Jenkins
- George Wiltshire as Reverend Juniper
- Herbert Junior as Onnie
- Alonso Bosan as (Alonzo Bozan) as Charlie
- Maude Simmons as Lady
- Al Young as Old Man
- Augustus Smith Jr. As Chinka Pin
