= Artie Belle McGinty =

American actress (1892–1963)

- Born: 1892; Atlanta, Georgia, U.S.
- Died: 1963 (aged 70–71)
- Occupation(s): Actress, performer, comedienne
- Years active: 1914–1948

Artie Belle McGinty (1892–1963) was an American actor in theater, films, and radio in the United States from the 1910s through the 1940s. She performed as a singer, dancer, and comedienne. She was a member of the Negro Actors Guild and an appointed member of the organization's dance committee.

== Early life ==
McGinty was born in Atlanta, Georgia, to a shoemaker father and music teacher mother. Her focus as a child was on music, writing, and the dramatic arts. Her father tried to push her into becoming a teacher like her mother, but McGinty wanted to become a theater actor, and her mother supported her in these endeavors. When she was seven, she had her stage debut at a poetry recital. She played piano at 12 for other singers. She also worked as a seamstress at a tailor shop to earn money for her other activities.

== Career ==
=== Radio ===
Her debut on the radio occurred in 1927 as the original radio ad voice for Aunt Jemima. During the 1930s, she co-starred on the radio show Old Gold Hour alongside Fred Waring. On the show, she used the name Mandy Lou and played the role of the "stooge" who asked set-up questions for their comedic partner. She was replaced on the Old Gold Hour by Rosemary and Priscilla Lane by 1935 and, due to her role in Loose Moments lasting only a week, had to work as a cook due to a lack of other opportunities. In the early 1940s, she starred in the radio show soap opera Amanda of Honeymoon Hill on the station WABC. McGinty also starred in The Goldbergs during the same time period.

=== Film and theatre ===
During her 20s, McGinty was part of C. W. Park's Musical Comedy Company from August to November 1914. The following year, she joined Alexander Tolliver's Circus and Musical Extravaganza and performed in his Big Show and Smart Set series from March 1915 until September 1917. She acted in a combination role with fellow vaudeville performer Tressie Leggs. She also toured and performed with Ma Rainey.

== Theater ==
- Lily White (1930) as Sister Dolsey
- Loose Moments (1935) as Lilla
- Plumes in the Dust (1936) as Lizzie
- You Can't Take It With You (1939)
- No Time For Comedy (1940)
- Janie (1942) as Tina

== Filmography ==
- Chicago After Dark (1946 short)
- Lucky Gamblers (1946 short)
- Junction 88 (1947) as Mrs. Jenkins
