= Now and Forever (1934 film) =

1934 film by Henry Hathaway

- Theatrical release poster
- Directed by: Henry Hathaway
- Screenplay by: Vincent Lawrence; Sylvia Thalberg
- Story by: Jack Kirkland; Melville Baker
- Produced by: Louis D. Lighton
- Starring: Gary Cooper; Carole Lombard; Shirley Temple
- Cinematography: Harry Fischbeck
- Edited by: Ellsworth Hoagland
- Music by: Harry Revel; Mack Gordon
- Production company: Paramount Pictures
- Distributed by: Paramount Pictures
- Release date: August 31, 1934 (USA)
- Running time: 82 minutes
- Country: United States
- Language: English

Now and Forever is a 1934 American crime drama film directed by Henry Hathaway. The screenplay by Vincent Lawrence and Sylvia Thalberg was based on the story "Honor Bright" by Jack Kirkland and Melville Baker. The film stars Gary Cooper, Carole Lombard, and Shirley Temple in a story about a small-time swindler going straight for his child's sake. Temple sang "The World Owes Me a Living," introducing the future standard. The film was critically well received. Temple adored Cooper, who nicknamed her 'Wigglebritches'. This is the only film in which Lombard and Temple appeared together.

== Plot ==
Carefree, irresponsible Jerry Day and his second wife, Toni, are running up a bill at a Shanghai hotel that Jerry has no means to pay. Jerry hatches a scheme to swindle other guests to get money to pay his hotel bill and the two escape to the next leg of their foreign vacation. Desperate for more cash, Jerry is willing to sell the custody rights of his five-year-old daughter Penelope from his first marriage, known as Pennie, whom he has never met, to his former brother-in-law. Toni is shocked and goes by herself to Paris, while Jerry meets his daughter and is captivated by her, deciding to retain custody after all. Pennie and Jerry arrive in Paris to be reunited with Toni, who will now play her mother. After selling a non-existent gold mine to Felix Evans, a man who turns out to be much more versed in the art of swindling than he, Jerry decides to re-enter the workforce as a real estate salesman, but is not very successful. Soon he finds himself in need of cash to support himself, Pennie and Toni.

Jerry meets up again with Evans, who had paid with a phony check, and Evans convinces Jerry to steal a valuable necklace from Mrs. Crane, a rich lady Pennie has befriended. Mrs. Crane tells Jerry that she wants to adopt Pennie, and offers to throw a party for her. During the party, Jerry spots one of Mrs. Crane's expensive necklaces lying out on her dresser and steals it, hiding it in Pennie's teddy bear. The police are called and all the guests are searched but the necklace is not found. When Pennie is put to bed, she cuddles her teddy bear and discovers the necklace hidden inside. She asks Jerry if he stole it and he says no. To get her to stop crying, Toni tells Pennie that it was she who took the necklace so really Jerry was telling the truth. Pennie is again satisfied that her father did not lie.

Jerry brings the necklace to Evans to resell it, but starts feeling guilty when Pennie throws all her faith and love towards Jerry for being honest. He goes back to try to recover the necklace and threatens Evans with a gun; Evans shoots back and wounds Jerry, but Jerry kills Evans. Jerry returns the necklace to Mrs. Crane, who agrees to lie that the necklace was not stolen at all, but mislaid. Mrs. Crane then takes Pennie off to boarding school, while Jerry, suffering from his untreated gunshot wound, and Toni say goodbye to her. Though Jerry does not want to go to a doctor lest the police be involved, he collapses as he tries to get back in the car and Toni takes him to a hospital. Lying in a hospital bed with a police officer standing nearby, Jerry ruminates that it is not so bad coming clean after all.

== Cast ==
- Gary Cooper as Jerry Day
- Carole Lombard as Toni Day
- Shirley Temple as Penelope Day
- Sir Guy Standing as Felix Evans
- Charlotte Granville as Mrs. J.H.P. Crane
- Gilbert Emery as James Higginson
- Henry Kolker as Mr. Clark
- Tetsu Komai as Mr. Ling

== Production ==
Shirley Temple was loaned out to Paramount by Fox Films for $3,500 a week in what would be her second film at Paramount. It would also be the first film in which a stand-in (Marilyn Granas) was hired for Temple. Temple had a good rapport with the adult crew, especially Gary Cooper, who bought her several toys and made a number of sketches for her. During the making of the movie, Dorothy Dell, who co-starred with Temple in Little Miss Marker and developed a close personal friendship with her, died in an automobile accident. Temple was not told about this until filming started on the crying scene in the film in which her character finds out her father was lying to her about stealing the jewelry. The tears she was crying in that scene were, in effect, real tears.

In the film, Temple sings "The World Owes Me a Living", a version of which also featured in a Silly Symphonies animation of The Ant and the Grasshopper in the same year.

Hathaway had directed Shirley Temple before, in To the Last Man (1933) starring Randolph Scott and Esther Ralston and released the previous year. Despite having a memorable role in which her doll's head is shot off right in front of her, the then 5-year-old Temple was not cited in the credits.

=== Alternate ending ===
The film was originally made with a different ending, in which Jerry and Toni drive alongside the train tracks as Pennie and Mrs. Crane depart on the train. Jerry succumbs to his gunshot wound en route, and Toni takes over the wheel, steering the car over an embankment and killing herself as well. The ending was re-scripted and re-filmed by Paramount to match the lighter tone of the rest of the film.

== Release ==
Now and Forever was released on August 31, 1934. It was popular at the box office.

== Critical reception ==
The New York Times thought the film was "a sentimental melodrama" and "a pleasant enough entertainment". It gives high praise to Temple, citing her "enormous charm", "unspoiled freshness of manner", and "total absence of self-consciousness" for giving the script authenticity and rescuing it from total incredulity.

Louella Parsons was amazed "at the ease with which [Temple] reels off her lines, saying big words and expressions. There is nothing parrot-like about Shirley. She knows what she is talking about". Temple-fever spread with the release of the film. Her fan mail (which numbered 400–500 letters a day) was delivered in huge mail sacks to the studio, and a secretary was hired to manage it.

In her 2015 book Shirley Temple and the Performance of Girlhood, Kristen Hatch casts the entire screenplay as a commentary on the tension between the grown-up, capitalist marketplace and the unburdened fantasy life of childhood. The character of Jerry is locked in childhood and imagination, unable to hold down a real job and constantly reverting to carefree and irresponsible fun and games. His daughter Pennie, as a child who is removed from the "cynical and rational world of the capitalist marketplace", is the perfect person to save him, but she is in danger of losing her own innocence by being paired with a criminal father. Pennie does ultimately serve as Jerry's savior, for her faith in him to always tell the truth impels him to risk his life to retrieve what he stole and maintain that faith. Hatch also notes the constant references to money (including the child's name, Pennie), bills, and checks, reinforcing the theme of the capitalist marketplace.

== See also ==
- Gary Cooper filmography
- Shirley Temple filmography
- Carole Lombard filmography

== Sources ==
- Edwards, Anne (1988). Shirley Temple: American Princess. New York: William Morrow and Company, Inc.
- Hatch, Kristen (2015). Shirley Temple and the Performance of Girlhood. Rutgers University Press. ISBN 9780813563275.
- Nowlan, Robert A.; Nowlan, Gwendolyn W. (2013). Film Quotations: 11,000 Lines Spoken on Screen, Arranged by Subject, and Indexed. Vol. 1. McFarland. ISBN 9780786474066.
- Windeler, Robert (1992) [1978]. The Films of Shirley Temple. New York: Carol Publishing Group. ISBN 0-8065-0725-X.
- "Shirley Temple "Pennie" Gary Cooper in Now And Forever" (PDF).
