= Alexander Tolliver =

- Born: July 4, 1886; Richmond, Virginia, United States
- Died: unknown, 1957 or later
- Occupations: Black Vaudeville promoter, entertainer

Alexander Tolliver (July 4, 1885/87 – death date unknown, after 1957) was an American performer and showman, important in the development and promotion of African-American entertainment, and specifically blues music, in the early years of the twentieth century. He was active in Black Vaudeville.

== Biography ==
Tolliver was born in Richmond, Virginia, in 1885, 1886, or 1887. He first performed as a novelty dancer on roller skates in vaudeville shows, and in 1908 also toured with his wife Mabel (or Maybelle) as part of a vocal sextet, Downie's Uncle Tom's Cabin Company. Over the next few years, Alexander and Mabel Tolliver performed both separately and together in various travelling minstrel shows, with Mabel Tolliver described in one account as "the happy possessor of a great voice", and Alexander (sometimes Al) Tolliver as a "sensational roller skater [who] won much admiration for the many difficult figures he cut in his act".

In 1914, Tolliver became a stage manager in C. W. Park's Musical Comedy Company, working with blues singers Evelyn White, Coot Grant, and Clara Smith, among other members of the company. The following year, Park's name disappeared from the company's billing and it became known as "Tolliver's Big Show", or "Tolliver's Smart Set". The name "Smart Set" had first been used for a tent show by Billy McClain and Ernest Hogan and was primarily associated at the time with a rival promoter, Salem Tutt Whitney, who disputed Tolliver's use of the term for several years.

Tolliver made a point of only employing African Americans, both as entertainers and in backroom roles. The company toured widely as a tent show in the Southern States, and each winter was settled in New Orleans. The shows had an audience capacity of about 3,000 (some claim 5,000), around an innovative central stage. As well as Evelyn White, Clara Smith and Coot Grant, the company rapidly expanded to include, in 1915, such performers as Gertrude "Ma" Rainey, Trixie Smith, Frankie Jaxon, Eddie Lightfoot, Artie Belle McGinty, cornetist Willie Hightower, clarinetist and orchestra leader Fred Kewley, and the pairing of Jodie Edwards and Susie Hawthorne, later known as Butterbeans and Susie.

Historians Lynn Abbott and Doug Seroff state that, between 1914 and 1917, "Tolliver developed a unique concept in entertainment, something that was never reproduced on a comparable scale – a variety show that blended his legendary roster of blues singers and jazz musicians with the most ambitious African American 'novelty' lineup that had ever been assembled. Tolliver's prototypical 'blues revue' was also rife with... wonderful acts whose rightful place in the mainstream American circus was barred by impenetrable racial segregation." They describe Tolliver's 1916 show, in which he put together an all-Black show with an emphasis on jazz and blues performers, as "one of the most brilliant entertainments in the history of the African American stage". It popularized among a wide audience the style later referred to as "classic blues". Tolliver himself was described at the time as "the Barnum of the Colored Race."

Tolliver and his financial backer C. W. Park ended their association at the end of 1916, though Park continued to use Tolliver's name in publicity for his new show. Tolliver himself and his company, including, for a time, Bessie Smith, continued to tour. However, by the end of 1917 some key members of the company left, including Smith, Ma Rainey, Willie Hightower, and Butterbeans and Susie. His marriage to Mabel ended after she also left the touring company. Tolliver was drafted in 1918, but on his discharge continued to organise "Smart Set" tours around the South. These continued for several years. In 1925, Tolliver's Smart Set was regarded as a big attraction on the TOBA vaudeville theater circuit, and it continued to operate until at least 1934.

Tolliver's later life has not been publicly reported. In 1942, he was working in Cincinnati, and in 1945 was married again, to Essie Pennington, in Hope, Arkansas; the marriage certificate describes him as a laborer. He was still advertising for minstrel performers in Louisiana as late as 1950. His final Social Security record dates from 1957.
