= Rescue of Sea Nymph =

2017 US Navy rescue of lost sailors

The rescue of Sea Nymph was the United States Navy's safe recovery of two crew from the sailboat Sea Nymph, which had been adrift in the Pacific Ocean for more than five months.

In May 2017, sailor Jennifer Appel and landsman Tasha Fuiava left Honolulu with their two dogs aboard a fully stocked and equipped Sea Nymph. According to the women, on their first night afloat, their boat took damage from a "force 11 storm"; further damage was inflicted by a typhoon, leaving the boat functionally adrift and incommunicado. Tiger shark attacks, a white squall, and Fuiava's inexperience supposedly caused further problems for the four.

Almost six months after leaving Hawaii, Sea Nymph was spotted by a Taiwanese fishing vessel, and though Appel would later claim the larger boat was attacking theirs, she was able to use their satellite phone to contact the United States Coast Guard for help. USS Ashland (LSD-48) arrived to rescue Appel, Fuiava, and their dogs, but left Sea Nymph adrift after determining it to be unseaworthy.

After their rescue and the media attention it garnered, the two-woman crew of the erstwhile Sea Nymph were questioned about many aspects of their story. Experts in sailing, meteorology, Hawaiian seamanship, and marine biology, as well as the Coast Guard and the Taipei Economic and Cultural Representative Office disputed claims made. Appel continued to stand by their statements. If unrecoverable, she could not collect Sea Nymph's insurance, though the ship was spotted still afloat about four months later.

== Background ==
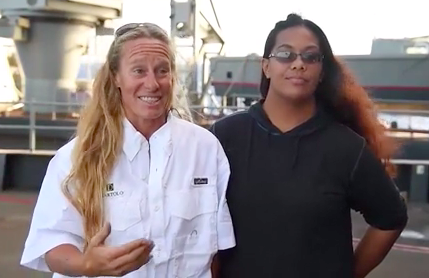
Appel & Fuiava, October 2017

Jennifer Appel (born 1968/1969) and Tasha Fuiava (born 1990/1991) were residents of Hawaii, and met in December 2016. Within a week of meeting, they had planned an 18-day trip, sailing to Tahiti— Appel was an experienced sailor while Fuiava was a novice. Appel wrecked her first boat, a 35-foot (11 m) fiberglass sloop, in 2012.

Sea Nymph is a 50-foot (15 m) sailboat, and was stocked with two desalinators as well as non-perishables such as "beef jerky, oatmeal, rice, pasta, dried fruits, [and] nuts". The boat was also equipped with a properly registered, fully operational emergency position-indicating radiobeacon (EPIRB).

== Adrift ==
Voyage of Sea Nymph
- Pacific Ocean locations
- Dates: May 3 – October 25, 2017
- Duration: 176 days (5.78 months)

Appel and Fuiava were residents of Honolulu, living with two dogs (Zeus and Valentine) aboard their sailboat Sea Nymph. The women said they set sail from Hawaii on May 3, 2017 for an 18-day, 2,700-mile (4,300 km) voyage to Tahiti, but encountered a "force 11 storm"—winds between 56–63 knots (104–117 km/h; 64–72 mph), waves from 37–52 feet (11–16 m)—that same night. This initial storm lasted three nights and three days. Four days later, the boat's spreader broke. The pair considered returning to Hawaii, but did not because they believed the harbors at Maui and Lanai were not deep enough to accommodate Sea Nymph.

Further problems occurred, including tiger shark attacks, damage to their engine and mast, and malfunctions in their radiotelephone and Iridium satellite phone. Lacking communications, Sea Nymph failed to avoid a typhoon with 100–150-mile-per-hour (160–240 km/h) winds and 40-foot (12 m) waves.

The women headed for Kiribati, but couldn't land due to the broken communications equipment. The Cook Islands were their next target, but a white squall and Fuiava's inexperience pushed them further west. On October 1, Sea Nymph came within two miles (3.2 km) of Wake Island, and the women aboard managed to contact officials there. However, the boat was on the wrong side of the island to receive assistance, and both the swell and winds were pushing them westward, preventing them from looping around.

== Rescue ==
On October 24, 900 miles (1,400 km) southeast of Japan, Sea Nymph was spotted by a Taiwanese fishing vessel.

Initial reports say the Taiwanese notified the United States Coast Guard (USCG) in Guam, and began towing the lost boat, compromising its hull. Once they knew rescue was on its way, Appel and Fuiava began broadcasting a mayday. Appel later changed this part of her story, saying the Taiwanese ship had instead attacked Sea Nymph by intentionally failing to keep the appropriate towing distance and colliding with the much smaller vessel: "The Taiwanese fishing vessel was not planning to rescue us […] They tried to kill us during the night." Appel claimed she was able to use the Taiwanese satellite phone and alert the USCG of all this because nobody aboard the Taiwanese ship spoke English.

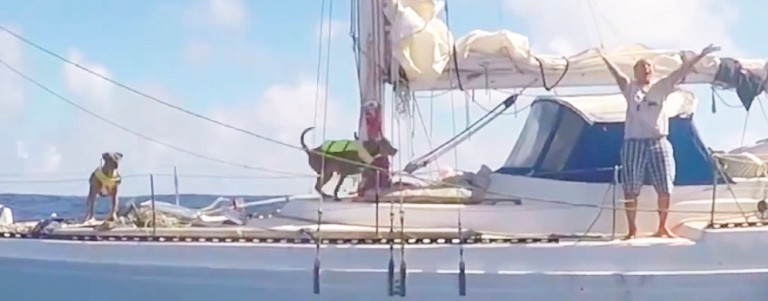
Ashland photo of Appel, Zeus, & Valentine aboard Sea Nymph

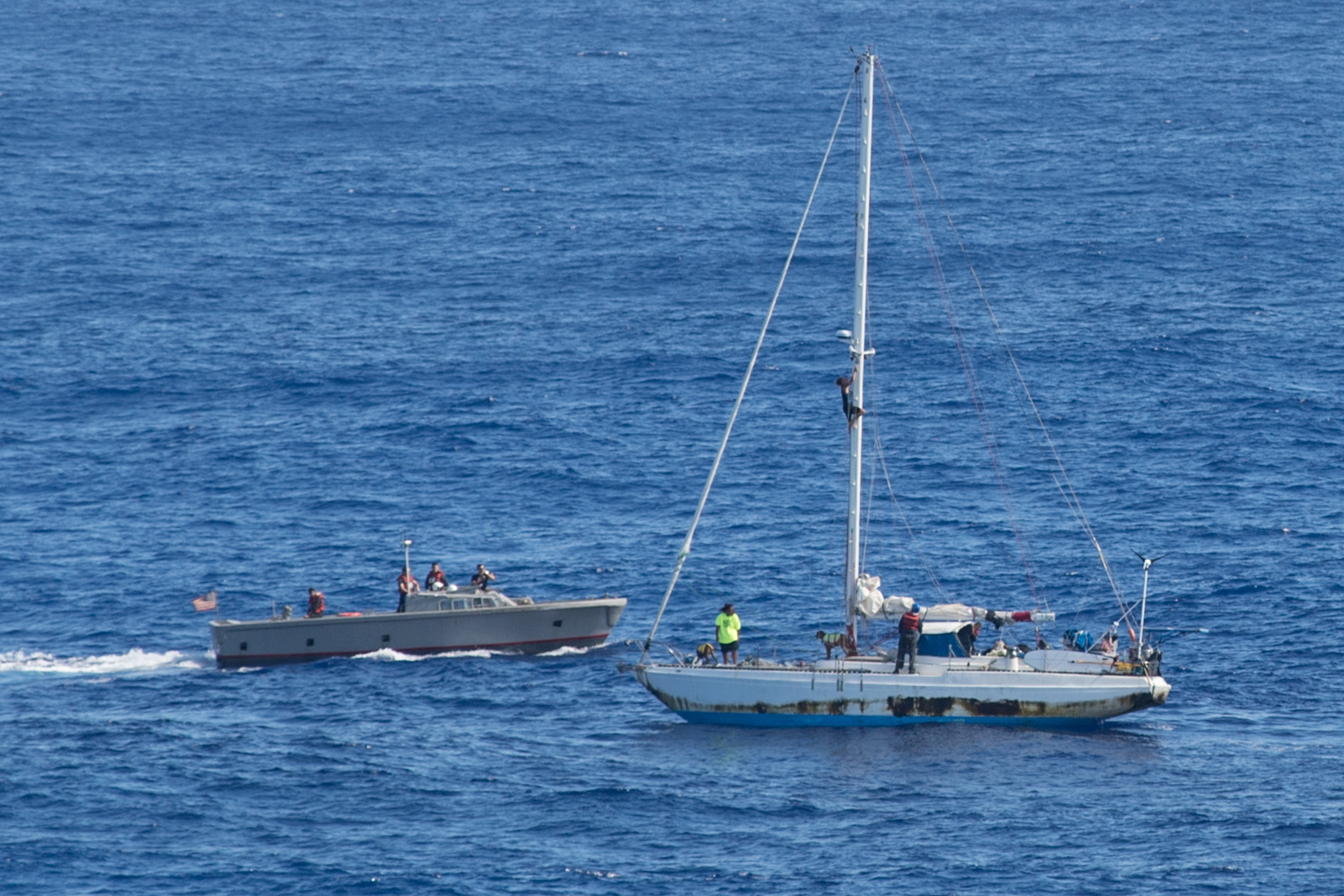
Ashland sailors and Sea Nymph

Rescuees aboard Ashland

USS Ashland (LSD-48) was on a routine deployment nearby, and arrived on October 25 at 10:30 a.m. Rescuing the two women and two dogs at 1:18 p.m., the Navy determined Sea Nymph to be unseaworthy and left the boat adrift off the coast of Asia. Appel and Fuiava were given "medical assessments, food, and berthing arrangements" aboard Ashland until the ship could deliver the four to its next port of call: White Beach Naval Facility, a US Naval base in Okinawa. In a press conference aboard Ashland, Appel stated that, "Had they not been able to locate us, we would have been dead within 24 hours".

Upon arriving in Okinawa on October 30, Zeus and Valentine were quarantined while Appel and Fuiava recovered at the US consulate in Naha.

== Inconsistencies ==
Asked about the unused EPIRB by CNN, USCG Petty Officer Second Class Tara Molle said, "I can't speculate as to why they wouldn't have activated it." On October 31, Appel said that they didn't activate the EPIRB because their boat was still seaworthy; "EPIRB calls are for people who are in an immediate life threatening scenario […] It would be shameful to call on the USCG resources when not in imminent peril and allow someone else to perish because of it." She followed this up saying, "Had we known our calls were going nowhere — we would have used the EPIRB — but hindsight is 20/20". On November 8, Appel told Today's Matt Lauer that after activating the EPIRB, it would have taken emergency services 4–24 hours to arrive; the USCG disputed such a delay, citing "cases in remote Alaska where a ship in distress just using one form of beacon brought a fairly quick response from nearby fishing boats and the Coast Guard." Appel defended their decision saying, "we took our chances with the man upstairs, who gave us grace and allowed us to still be here today." After she amended her version of events with the alleged Taiwanese attack on Sea Nymph, Appel said she eschewed the EPIRB because it would have immediately alerted the Taiwanese captain, as opposed to her telephoning Guam and relaying her emergency in English.

National Oceanic and Atmospheric Administration's Pacific-Ocean weather readings for May 3, 2017

Appel and Fuiava said they encountered a "force 11 storm" on May 3. Though the National Weather Service in Hawaii issued a small craft advisory for the ʻAlenuihāhā and Pailolo Channels that day, it recorded "no organized storm systems near the Hawaiian Islands on the dates of May 3, 2017 or the few days afterward."

The Associated Press not only debunked claims that the harbors of Maui and Lanai could not accommodate Sea Nymph, but also reported that Hawaiʻi has multiple such places to dock. Furthermore, Appel's descriptions of other landing opportunities not taken seem to assume that Kiritimati (population over 2,000 people) was uninhabited. As for the claims of tiger shark attacks, marine biologists refuted this, saying that the macropredators don't behave that way, nor do they grow to the lengths reported.

On October 30, USCG spokesperson Lieutenant Scott Carr announced that in June, the Coast Guard contacted a ship calling itself Sea Nymph in the vicinity of Tahiti. That ship's captain said their ship was in no distress, and would make landfall the next day. According to the timeline given by Appel and Fuiava, this interaction happened after they allegedly had loss of engine and mast/rigging damage. On Today, Appel produced a GPS tracking unit, claiming that it was from her boat, and that it recorded Sea Nymph "nowhere near Tahiti".

As for Appel's allegations against the Taiwanese ship, the Taipei Economic and Cultural Representative Office called them untrue, citing the Taiwanese vessel's "GPS and a satellite system that automatically submits its track, location, and speed to a 24-hour monitoring center. […] the fishing vessel stopped sailing right after spotting Ms. Appel's boat and never attempted to ram against their vessel or kill them as she claimed".

== Aftermath ==
Of the inconsistencies, the United States Navy stated that it doesn't investigate such incidents, while as of October 2017, the Coast Guard was still reviewing the case.

Appel and Fuiava's story received enough attention that a tabloid published nude photos of the older woman from her time as a dominatrix in the 2000s. Furthermore, prior to ceasing contact altogether, Appel's family in Texas told her they didn't want her to return home.

By mid-November 2017, both women were in New York City, having been flown there by Today. In an interview with The Guardian, they each expressed a desire to return to the sea, preferably aboard a recovered Sea Nymph. If Sea Nymph is unrecoverable, Appel cannot receive its insurance money because it was abandoned more than 400 miles (640 km) from shore. Zeus and Valentine required vaccinations before they could return to Hawaii, but Appel left her wallet aboard the boat, and was running out of cash. Since the dogs could not return to Hawaii until December at the earliest, Appel and Fuiava were planning a trans-continental road trip saying, "Eventually, we're either going to find out my boat has been found or we're going to start working on a new boat […] We are incredibly appreciative of the navy, […] if I had it to do again, I would just keep going."

During the 2017–2018 Volvo Ocean Race, Sea Nymph was spotted by Turn the Tide on Plastic on February 13 (UTC) during the sixth leg of the yacht race. Turn the Tide on Plastic was between Hong Kong and Auckland, approximately 360 miles (580 km) east of Guam. The captain, Dee Caffari, described the abandoned boat as "sitting pretty low in the bow and her mainsail was washed over the side but the rest of her looked like she would make a nice cruiser." In the interests of the race, Sea Nymph was left where it was found, "a hazard to shipping, a risk to islands, reefs and atolls and slowly not going anywhere."
