= Violated Paradise =

1963 film by Marion Gering

- Directed by: Marion Gering
- Based on: Meeting with Japan by Fosco Maraini
- Produced by: Marion Gering
- Starring: Kazuko Mine
- Narrated by: Paulette Girard; Tom Rowe (English)
- Music by: Marcello Abbado
- Distributed by: Victoria Films; Times Film Corp.
- Release date: June 7, 1963 (US)
- Running time: 68 mins.
- Country: Italy

Violated Paradise (also known as Scintillating Sin, Sea Nymphs; U.S. titles: Diving Girls of Japan and The Diving Girls' Island) is a 1963 Italian sexploitation film directed and produced by Marion Gering and starring Kazuko Mine. It was based on the 1960 book Meeting with Japan by Fosco Maraini (per film credits).

== Plot ==
A girl from a remote village in northern Japan travels to Tokyo in the hope of becoming a geisha. On her way to the city, she sees a village where she is attracted towards a fisherman. There, women work as pearl divers (Japanese: ama・海女, "sea women"). When she reaches the city, she decides against being a geisha and works as a hotel maid instead. In the end, the fisherman reaches the city, marries her and takes her to the village, where she works as a pearl diver.

== Cast ==
- Kazuko Mine as Tomako
- Paulette Girard as narrator
- Tom Rowe as narrator

== Production ==
Fosco Maraini and Roy M. Yaginuma were directors of photography.

A few images shot by Maraini's crew were used in the production.

Marcello Abbado composed the film's music with additional scores provided by Sergio Pagoni.

== Release ==
The film's New York premiere was held on June 7, 1963. Victoria Films and Times Film Corp. were the film's distributors.

In the United States, the film was advertised as adults-only. In North Carolina, the film was shown as a double feature along with 1000 Shapes of a Female.

== Reception ==
Boxoffice wrote: "A beautifully photographed exploitation film which concentrates on female nudity yet is far above the usual picture made for and relegated to the downtown sex houses in the key cities. ... This is strictly documentary stuff, designed mainly to shock patrons, and, with the Tokyo nightclub revelations, make the picture strictly adult fare – informative though much of it is."

Jasper Sharp wrote in his 2008 book Behind the pink curtain that the film stood "as a fascinating visual document of a city in the midst of major transition".

The Realist's critic called the film a "short bore".

== Home media ==
The film was included in the DVD for The Notorious Concubines. Reviewer Douglas Pratt wrote: "The full screen picture has faded colors and lots of scratches, but is tolerable.

DVD Verdict called it a combination of National Geographic and native Japanese styles and "awash with scrapes, dirt, and highly irritating editing jumps".
