= Pearl farming industry in China =

Pearl farming in China is mainly concentrated in the southeastern part of the country, with the waterways of Zhejiang province serving as the source for China's freshwater pearls. Production has greatly increased through the 1990s and 2000s, with China, according to Times Online, producing 90% of pearl necklaces globally. Times Online indicated that in 2007 "China produced 1,600 tonnes of pearls..., more than 95 per cent of world production."

According to the Gems and Jewelry Trade Association of China China produced in 2007, "1,600 tons of pearls - over 95 percent of the world's total output".

== See also ==
- Zhuji City -- pearl industry base
- Cultured pearls
- Pearl hunting
