= Eddie Lightfoot =

American actor

Eddie Lightfoot (January 14, 1895 – 1964) was an American minstrel dancer active for more than 40 years in the itinerant black stage and tent theatre circuits of the first half of the Twentieth Century. Missing the lower half of his right leg, he performed under the stage names "Peg" or "Peg Leg" Lightfoot in myriad minstrel companies including Alexander Tolliver's "Big Show" and "Smart Set", and The Rabbit's Foot Minstrels from as early as 1913 into the mid-1950s.

== Life ==
Eddie “Peg” or “Peg Leg” Lightfoot was born Edward Rodgers on January 14, 1895, in Memphis, Tennessee to a Victoria Dickerson (b.1878) and an unnamed father. Victoria married a Burl Lightfoot (b.1868) sometime prior to 1900 and Burl appears to have adopted Edward between 1900 and 1910 as his legal name changed to “Eddie Lightfoot” in that year's census (which also states an approximate age of 15 and an occupation of “Laborer; Brickyard”).

Whether the loss of his leg was from birth or the result of some youthful misfortune is unknown, but the earliest appearance of Lightfoot as an entertainer comes in an issue of The Chattanooga News from September 13, 1913, where an advertisement for a presumably all-black variety show, part of a G.A.R. convention at the city's Savoy Theatre, billed him as “Eddie Lightfoot, Famous Peg-Leg Buck Dancer."

His World War I draft card can be found online and lists his occupation as an “Actor” for Alex Tolliver and notes “Right Leg Off” in a blank requesting information on physical disabilities. The latest published mentions of Lightfoot as a performer come in news reports of a 1954 tour of the “Rabbit’s Foot Minstrels” through the south, suggesting that for more than 40 years, Eddie danced prolifically in itinerant black minstrel companies (his 1940 census, for instance, which notes his occupation as “Dancer,” has him on the road for 47 weeks in the previous year).

This tireless schedule earned him at least some sense of financial security, as sometime between 1920 and 1930 he appears to have purchased a home for his mother and father in the emerging, affluent African-American subdivision of New Chicago in North Memphis at 162 Caldwell Ave., an address he maintained likely until his death in 1964 (a Memphis city directory as late as 1960 lists him at the address).

In RAGGED BUT RIGHT: Black Traveling Shows, "Coon Songs," and the Dark Pathway to Blues and Jazz (2009) Lynn Abbott and Doug Seroff noted:

"In the minstrel tent they can see such performers as Peg Leg Lightfoot, who dances on one good leg and one artificial one [...] “Peg” Lightfoot is the same one-legged dancer who, according to a Freeman report of 1913, had “gone violently insane” after collapsing on the stage of the Monogram Theater, and who, according to the Chicago Defender of July 21, 1923, “was beaten nearly to death by a mob of whites at Erlanger, Ky.” Who could have predicted that Lightfoot would survive more than forty years in the minstrel profession?” (pp.288)

A review of a performance of Jailhouse Tolliver and his Colored Minstrels in the Uniontown, Pennsylvania EVENING STANDARD from September 25, 1934 included this description of Lightfoot’s act (amid glowing descriptions of Tolliver’s roller skate tap dancing):

“Then Eddie (Peg) Lightfoot made his appearance, and the house was his. This one-legged dancer was a marvel when it came to the complicated rhythms of eccentric tap routines. The applause he received when he first appeared may have been and no doubt was occasioned by pity. But the applause at the closer of his performance was given out of sheer admiration for his cleverness.”
