= Marion Gering =

American stage producer and director (1901–1977)

- Marion Gering
- Born: Marian Maximilianovich Gering; June 9, 1901; Rostov-on-Don, Russian Empire
- Died: April 19, 1977 (aged 75); New York City, New York, U.S.
- Occupations: Stage producer and director
- Spouse: Dorothy Libaire

Marion Gering (June 9, 1901 in Rostov-on-Don – April 19, 1977 in New York City) was a Russian-born American stage producer and director. He moved to the United States in 1923 as an artist. He became involved in the theatrical community in Chicago, founding the Chicago Play Producing Company.

His production of Georg Kaiser's Gas, which was presented at the Goodman Theatre on January 28, 1926, was particularly successful. In 1927, he began producing plays in New York City, and married actress Dorothy Libaire in 1930. In 1928 he co-produced and staged Aurania Rouverol's Skidding, which was later adapted as the Andy Hardy film series.

Gering became a Hollywood film director for Paramount Pictures in 1931, directing Gary Cooper and Carole Lombard in I Take This Woman on his debut. In 1932 he directed Tallulah Bankhead, Gary Cooper, Charles Laughton, and a young Cary Grant in Devil and the Deep. He collaborated several times with producer Albert Lewis, producing films together like Ready for Love and later stage productions like The Walking Gentleman at the Playhouse Theatre. In 1935 he directed George Raft and Carole Lombard in the film Rumba, inspired by the success of Bolero the previous year, but it wasn't as successful. Gering's stint with Paramount came to an end in 1936, and he then joined Columbia Pictures between 1937 and 1939, and directed the 1937 British picture Thunder in the City for the Atlantic Film Company. His film career came to a halt by the end of the decade. He tried in the subsequent period, albeit in vain, to build on his previous accomplishments as a theatre producer and to pursue film directing in Europe.

Between 1947 and 1949, he attempted to relaunch his film career in Cuba but with little success. In 1950, he briefly returned to film directing Michael Whalen, Doris Dowling and Tommy Wonder in the musical drama Sarumba. He later reportedly worked as a technical assistant and caretaker in colleges. He directed the sexploitation film Violated Paradise (1963).

== Filmography ==
- I Take This Woman (1931)
- 24 Hours (1931)
- Ladies of the Big House (1931)
- Devil and the Deep (1932)
- Madame Butterfly (1932)
- Pick-Up (1933)
- Jennie Gerhardt (1933)
- Good Dame (1934)
- Thirty-Day Princess (1934)
- Ready for Love (1934)
- Rumba (1935)
- Rose of the Rancho (1936)
- Lady of Secrets (1936)
- Thunder in the City (1937)
- She Married an Artist (1937)
- Sarumba (1950)
- Violated Paradise (1963)
