= Rumba (1935 film) =

1935 film by Marion Gering

- Directed by: Marion Gering
- Written by: Guy Endore (story); Howard J. Green
- Produced by: William Le Baron
- Starring: George Raft; Carole Lombard; Gail Patrick
- Cinematography: Ted Tetzlaff
- Music by: Francois B. de Valdes
- Distributed by: Paramount Pictures
- Release date: February 8, 1935
- Running time: 71 minutes
- Country: United States
- Language: English

Rumba is a 1935 American musical drama film starring George Raft as a Cuban dancer and Carole Lombard as a Manhattan socialite. The movie was directed by Marion Gering and is considered an unsuccessful follow-up to Raft and Lombard's smash hit Bolero the previous year.

== Plot ==
In Havana, Cuba, an American dancer called Joe Martin has a winning lottery ticket. However wealthy socialite Diana Harrison also has a lottery ticket with the same number. Joe's ticket is counterfeit so he misses out on the money. Diana feels sorry for him and offers to back him in his own night club but then changes her mind after he tries to seduce her.

Joe then discovers the rumba dance when he visits his home town during a fiesta. He gets financial backing from a Texan to establish a new nightclub with Flash, his manager. Joe dances the rumba with Carmelita and is a big success.

Diana goes to opening night with her boyfriend Hobart Fletcher. She dances with Joe and they fall in love. However Carmelita helps break them up.

Back in New York Diana discovers that Joe left New York because he had evidence that would send a gang member to prison. Diana breaks up with Hobart. Joe reads about this, signs with a Broadway producer and returns to New York. Joe is threatened with death by gangsters but decides to perform anyway. Carmelita faints out of fear but Diana steps up and performs the rumba with Joe. The performance is a big success and it's revealed that the gangster threats was a publicity stunt.

== Cast ==
- George Raft as Joe Martin
- Carole Lombard as Diana Harrison
- Lynne Overman as Flash
- Margo as Carmelita
- Gail Patrick as Patsy Fletcher
- Iris Adrian as Goldie Allen
- Monroe Owsley as Fletcher Hobart
- Jameson Thomas as Jack Solanger
- Soledad Jimenez as Maria
- Paul Porcasi as Carlos
- Samuel S. Hinds as Henry B. Harrison
- Virginia Hammond as Mrs. Harrison
- Ann Sheridan as a Chorus Girl (uncredited)
- Akim Tamiroff as Tony (uncredited)
- Jane Wyman as a Chorus Girl (uncredited)
- Jean Ross as a Chorus Girl (uncredited)

== Production ==
The film was based on an original story by Guy Endore which was purchased by Paramount in September 1933 as a vehicle for Raft.

Filming took place in November and December 1934. The film starred Margot a Mexican dancer who had just made her film debut in Crime Without Passion.

Danvce team Veloz and Yolanda coached Lombard and Raft in the dance sequences. The signature rumba danced near the end by Raft and Lombard seems to be a simplified variation of rumba performed by Veloz and Yolanda themselves the year before in another Paramount film starring George Burns and Gracie Allen, Many Happy Returns.

George Raft reportedly fought with Lombard during the shoot and refused to make a film with her later. He claimed this was because Paramount assigned Ted Tetzlaff to shoot the film and on Rumba Raft thought Tetzlaff favored Lombard rather than him.

== Reception ==
The film has been described as a box office flop and a hit.

The Los Angeles Times thought the story was even more "preposterous" than Bolero but felt it was a better movie due to its dancing, attractive women and music, calling the film "a sensory experience".
