= George P. Quigley =

American film director and producer

- Occupation(s): Director, Producer
- Notable work: Mistaken Identity, Murder with Music, Bob Howard's House Party, Sarumba

George P. Quigley was a director and producer of films in the United States and Cuba. The National Museum of African American History and Culture includes coverage of two films he directed and other sources identify several more. Quigley was the producer and director for three films produced by Century Productions during the period from mid 1946 to early 1948: Mistaken Identity, Murder with Music and Bob Howard's House Party. He was also involved with Super Sleuth produced by Consolidated National Films in 1944.

He produced Sarumba, which was thought to be the first feature-length film produced in Havana by an American company. Five weeks of shooting for the film concluded in April 1947. Quigley used Havana's National Studio, finding that labor costs were about half of what they were in the United States. His report on the industry conditions in Havana was covered by Variety, and the U.S. consul planned to release a guidebook based on his experience. As of October that year, Century Productions planned to close a deal for the film, and planned to film a second movie in Havana. The film's release by Eagle-Lion Films was announced in October 1949. It was given a "B" rating by the National Legion of Decency, indicating that it was "morally objectionable in part." It received some less than favorable reviews. A theater in Albany, New York withdrew the film shortly after it was released, along with The Devil in the Flesh, a film protested by the National League of Decency.

== Filmography ==
=== Director ===
- Murder with Music (1941), the 30-minute film Howard's House Party was clipped from it
- Mistaken Identity (1946)
- Junction 88 (1947)

=== Producer ===
- Sarumba (1950)

=== Writer ===
- Cuba Canta y Baila, screenplay
