= I Take This Woman (1931 film) =

1931 film

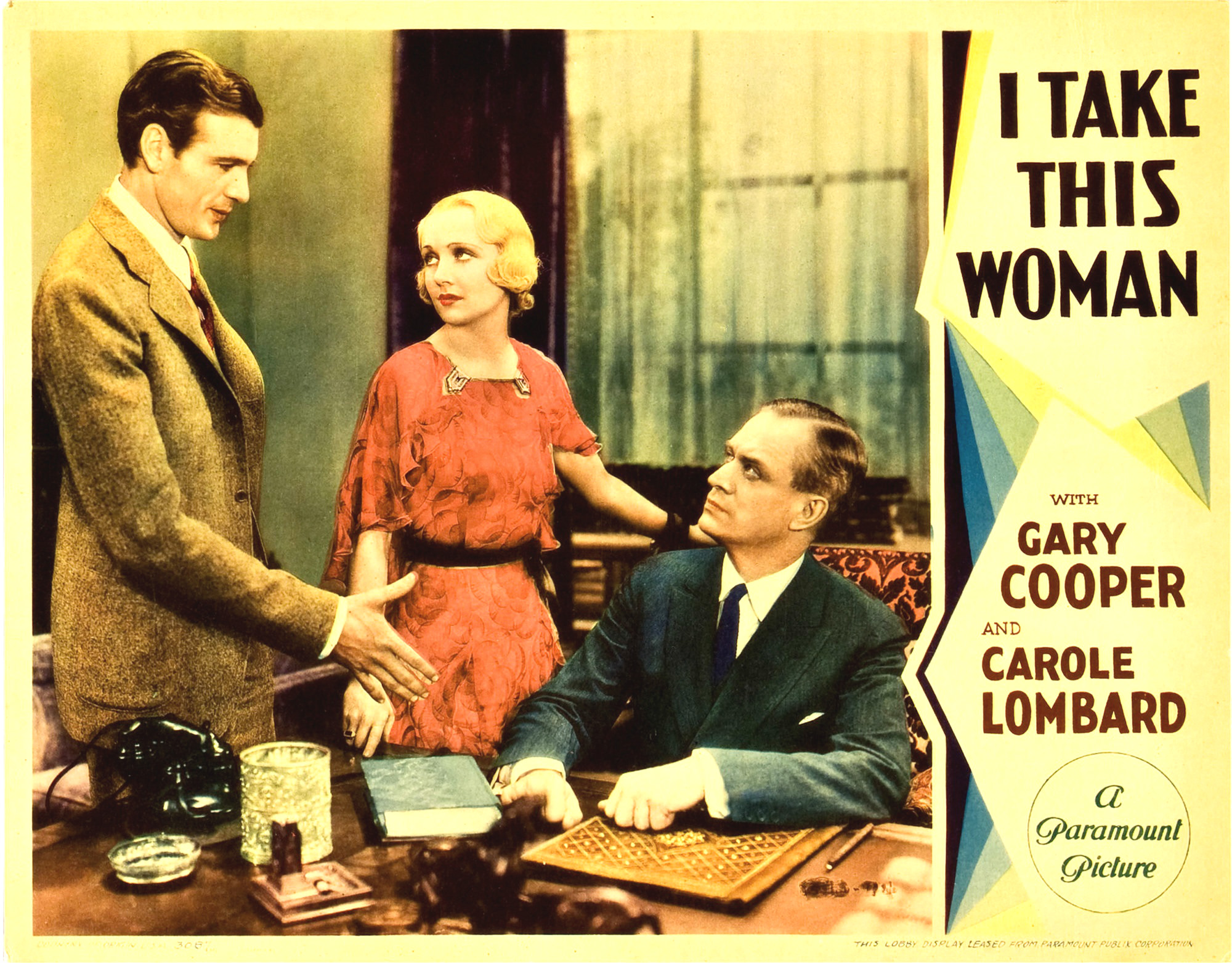
- Lobby card
- Directed by: Marion Gering
- Screenplay by: Vincent Lawrence
- Based on: Lost Ecstasy; 1927 novel by Mary Roberts Rinehart
- Starring: Gary Cooper; Carole Lombard; Helen Ware
- Cinematography: Victor Milner
- Production company: Paramount Pictures
- Distributed by: Paramount Pictures
- Release date: June 27, 1931 (USA)
- Running time: 72 minutes
- Country: United States
- Language: English

I Take This Woman is a 1931 American pre-Code romance film directed by Marion Gering and starring Gary Cooper and Carole Lombard.

Based on the novel Lost Ecstasy (1927) by Mary Roberts Rinehart, the film is about a wealthy New York socialite who falls in love and marries a cowboy while staying at her father's ranch out West. After her father disinherits her, and after a year of living as a cowboy's wife, she leaves her husband and returns to her family in the East. The film was released by Paramount Pictures.

The film has no connection to the 1940 film I Take This Woman starring Spencer Tracy and Hedy Lamarr, which is based on the Charles MacArthur story "A New York Cinderella".

== Plot ==
After causing yet another scandal, Kay Dowling, the spoiled daughter of wealthy New Yorkers, is given a stark choice by her fed-up father: go to his ranch in Ursula, Wyoming, (to avoid being named a co-respondent in a divorce case) or be disinherited. Kay's fiancé, Herbert Forrest, proposes getting married immediately, but she chooses the ranch.

Later, while spending her days on the ranch with her good-humored aunt Bessie, Kay falls reluctantly in love with one of her father's cowhands, Tom McNair, and impulsively marries him. When her father learns of the union, he disowns her. Kay and Tom are forced to live in a one-room shack while Tom tries to expand his cattle herd.

One year later, Kay is unhappy with life on the ranch, and longs for the comforts of her family's palatial mansion. One day, she receives a telegram from home, and tells Tom that her father is sick and that she must be with him. Back in New York, Kay writes a letter to Tom, asking for a divorce. Soon after, Tom arrives at the estate and explains that he left the ranch to become a professional bronco rider in a rodeo. Kay assumes that he never received the letter, and Tom never mentions it. One night during a party, Tom overhears the guests making fun of him and he confronts Kay, telling her that he *did* receive her letter, and made the trip to determine whether or not she still loved him. Satisfied with what he has learned, he tells her she can have her divorce. Later, as she realizes that life with Herbert would amount to a life of playing golf, Kay visits Tom at the rodeo. During his performance, he is thrown from a bronco and hurt. Kay rushes to Tom's side, and the two reconcile and decide to return to the ranch.

== Cast ==
- Gary Cooper as Tom McNair
- Carole Lombard as Kay Dowling
- Helen Ware as Aunt Bessie
- Lester Vail as Herbert Forrest
- Charles Trowbridge as Mr. Dowling
- Clara Blandick as Sue Barnes
- Gerald Fielding as Bill Wentworth
- Al Hart as Jake Mallory
- Guy Oliver as Sid
- Syd Saylor as Shorty
- Mildred Van Dorn as Clara Hammell
- Leslie Palmer as Phillips
- Ara Haswell as Nora
- Frank Darien as Station agent
- David Landau as Circus boss
- Flora Finch (uncredited)
- Lew Kelly as Foreman (uncredited)
- Robert Parrish as Boy (uncredited)
- Lon Poff (uncredited)

== Production ==
I Take This Woman marked the film debut of Russian-born director Marion Gering, who had previously directed stage plays.

Produced under the working titles Lost Ecstasy, Rodeo Romance, Half Angel, and In Defense of Love, the film was ultimately titled I Take This Woman by Paramount studio heads in order to "emphasize the romance rather than the western setting, and reflect more of the boy's role than the girl's".

Cooper and Lombard reportedly had an affair during the filming.

== Release ==
The film was released on June 27, 1931.

== Preservation status ==
This film apparently became an "orphan film" when the rights reverted to author Mary Roberts Rinehart. The original 35mm camera negative and all supporting material was shipped back to her, but she had no interest in (or appropriate storage for) the material. She disposed of the 35mm camera negative and retained only a 16mm print. A single surviving 35mm nitrate studio print became the basis for a restoration, funded by the Louis B. Mayer Foundation. The restored print was screened in March 2017 at the Festival of Preservation at the UCLA Film and Television Archive.
