= Tommy Wonder (dancer) =

American dancer (1914–1993)

Tommy Wonder (March 7, 1914 in Montana – December 11, 1993 in Riverdale, Bronx, New York City) was an American dancer, actor, choreographer, and artist manager. He was a principal dancer in the 1943 Ziegfeld Follies.

As a child, Wonder had an unspecified physical disability which hindered his ability to walk; to help him, his mother used clothes and a broomstick to build a puppet on which he could support himself. Wonder named the puppet "Suzanne", and with its help he was able not only to learn to walk, but to dance at a professional level; an upgraded version of "Suzanne", designed by members of the Westmore family, with human hair, and Wonder's mother's original broomstick, is in the Smithsonian Institution.

== Career ==
Wonder began as a child actor, performing in vaudeville; he subsequently appeared in the Our Gang films. As an adult, Wonder performed in numerous musical comedies; he also appeared in more serious films, including the 1938 Gangster's Boy. By 1946, his fame was such that his presence at social events was considered worth reporting.

In 1970, Wonder retired from performing and co-founded an artist management business with his former singing partner Don Dellair.
