= Corydon Wassell House =

Historic house in Arkansas, United States

- U.S. National Register of Historic Places
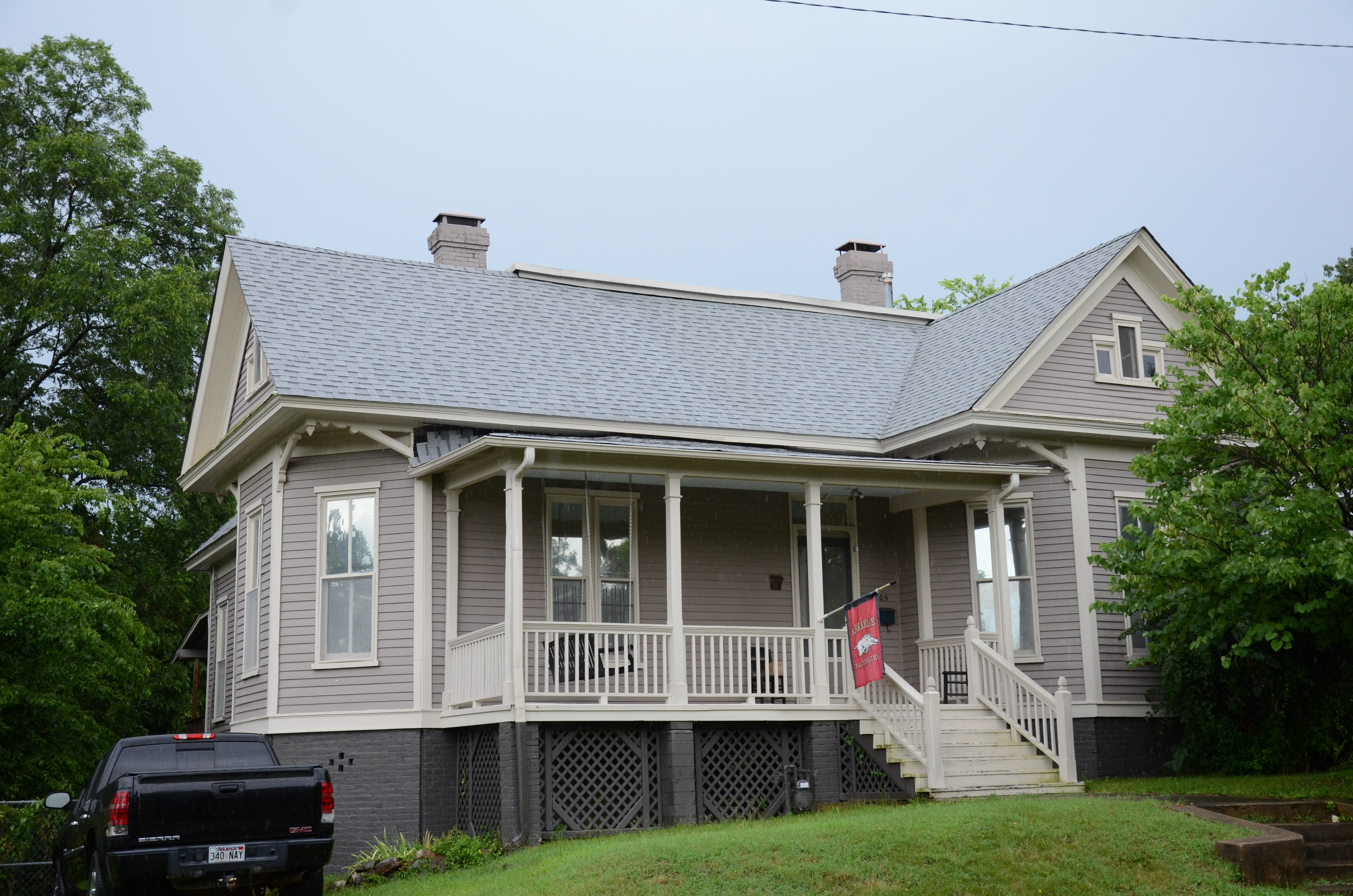

- Location within Arkansas Location within the United States
- Location: 2005 S. Scott St., Little Rock, Arkansas
- Coordinates: 34°43′45″N 92°16′20″W
- Area: less than one acre
- Built: 1882
- Architectural style: Queen Anne
- NRHP reference No.: 00000611
- Added to NRHP: June 2, 2000

The Corydon Wassell House is a historic house at 2005 South Scott Street in Little Rock, Arkansas. Built in 1882, it is a 1 1/2-story wood-frame cottage, with modest Late Victorian trim, and is architecturally typical for the neighborhood. It is nationally significant as the home of the doctor and missionary Corydon M. Wassell (1884-1958). Wassell was awarded the Navy Cross for his service during World War II, and his life was immortalized in the film The Story of Dr. Wassell.

The house was listed on the National Register of Historic Places in 2000.

== See also ==
- National Register of Historic Places listings in Little Rock, Arkansas
