= Corydon M. Wassell =

United States Navy physician

Corydon McAlmont Wassell
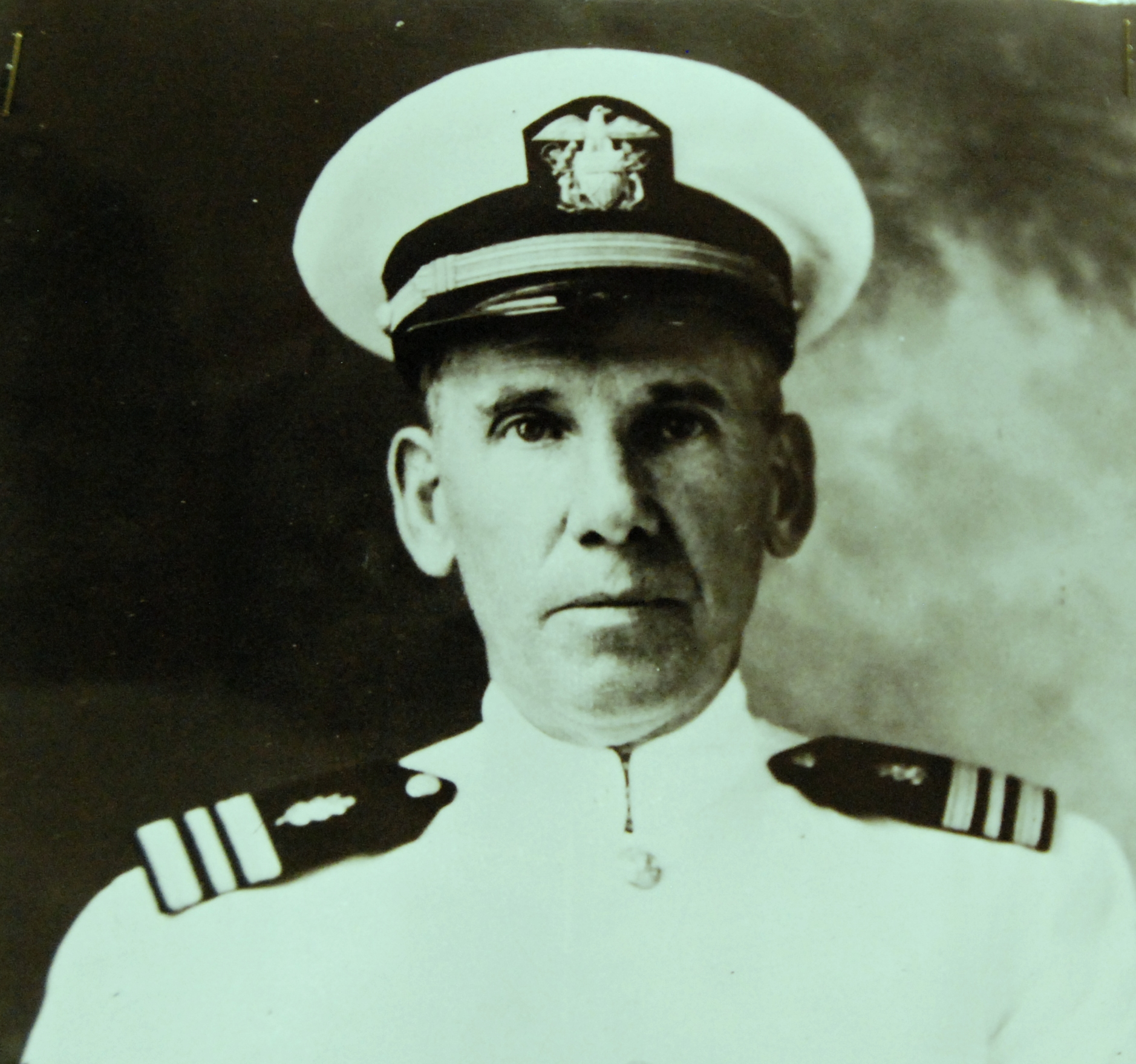
- Born: July 4, 1884; Little Rock, Arkansas, US
- Died: May 12, 1958 (aged 73); Little Rock, Arkansas, US
- Burial place: Arlington National Cemetery
- Spouses: Mary Irene Yarnell (m. 1911; died 1926) Madeline Edith Day (m. 1926)
- Children: 4, all with Mary Irene
- Military career
- Allegiance: United States
- Branch: United States Navy
- Rank: Rear admiral
- Conflicts: World War II
- Awards: Navy Cross

Corydon McAlmont Wassell (July 4, 1884 – May 12, 1958) was a medical doctor best known for his work as a United States Navy physician. He was born in Little Rock, Arkansas.

Wassell graduated with an M.D. from the University of Arkansas in 1909 and began his practice in Tillar, Arkansas. In 1913, he left his practice to serve as a medical missionary in Wuchang, China.

Wassell resumed regular duties with the United States Navy Reserve in 1936. In 1942, during World War II, he was a lieutenant commander, U.S.N.R., and acted as liaison officer for about forty wounded American servicemen from the USS Marblehead in a Dutch hospital in Java. He was awarded the Navy Cross for saving twelve of the most severely wounded from certain capture by the Japanese on Java, and accompanying them to Fremantle and safety.

Wassell's Navy Cross citations reads:

For especially meritorious conduct, devotion to duty, and utter disregard of personal safety, while in imminent contact with enemy forces and under attack from enemy aircraft, in caring for and evacuating the wounded of the United States Navy under his charge in Java, Netherlands East Indies, about March 1, 1942.

A radio speech by President Franklin Delano Roosevelt inspired Cecil B. DeMille to make a movie about Wassell, starring Gary Cooper. Titled The Story of Dr. Wassell, it was based on a biographical novel written by James Hilton. Wassell served as an uncredited technical adviser to the movie. According to his great-grandson, all of the proceeds that Wassell received from the movie were donated to a hospital for the deaf and blind in Little Rock.

Wassell died on May 12, 1958, in Little Rock and is buried in Arlington National Cemetery. His Little Rock home is listed on the National Register of Historic Places.
