= Gary Cooper =

American actor (1901–1961)

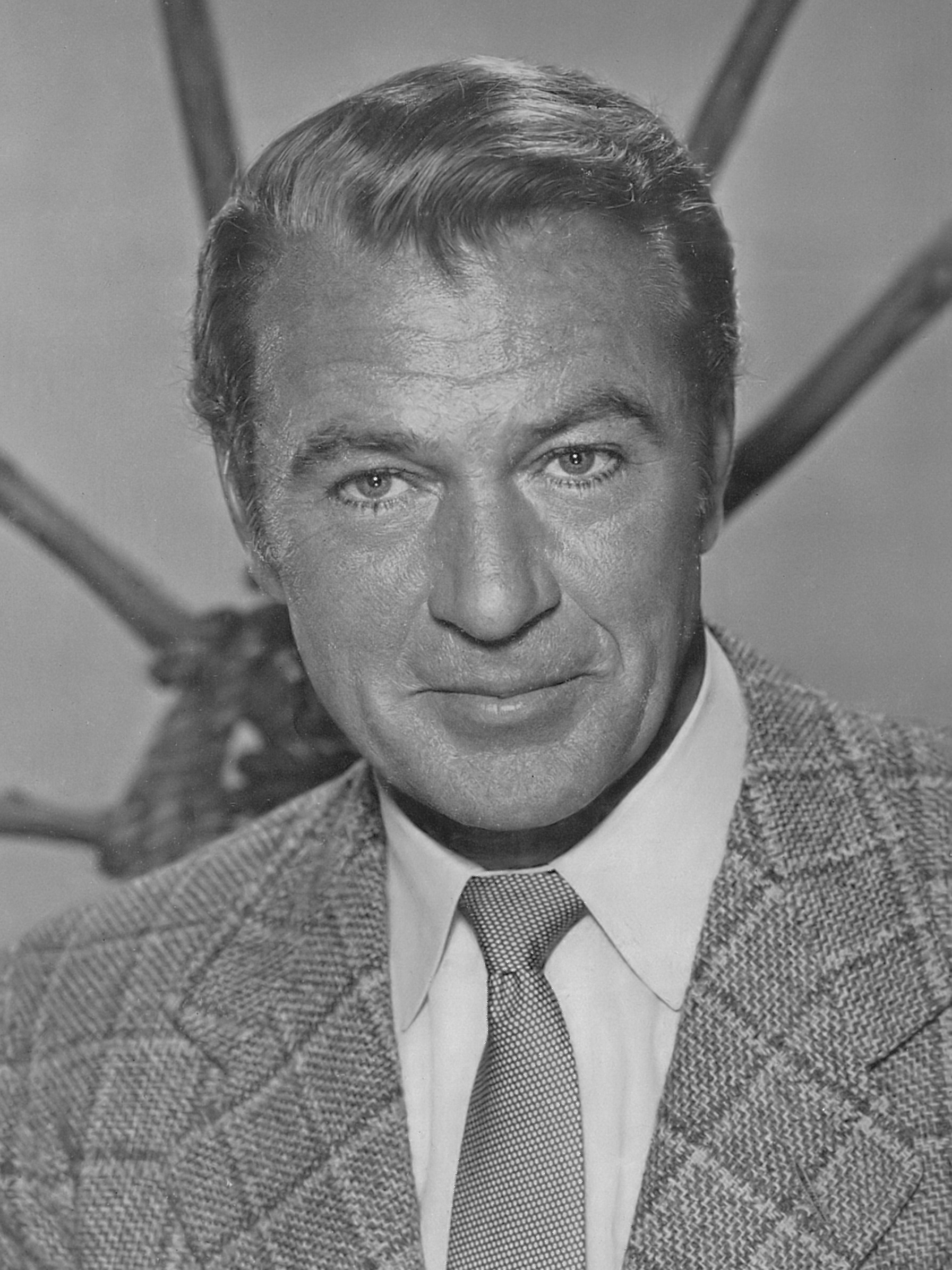
- Cooper in 1952
- Born: Frank James Cooper; May 7, 1901; Helena, Montana, U.S.
- Died: May 13, 1961 (aged 60); Los Angeles, California, U.S.
- Resting place: Sacred Hearts Cemetery, New York, U.S.
- Other name: Coop
- Occupation: Actor
- Years active: 1925–1961
- Political party: Republican
- Spouse: Veronica Balfe (m. 1933)
- Children: 1
- Father: Charles H. Cooper
- Family: Cedric Gibbons (uncle-in-law)
- Website: garycooper.com

Gary Cooper (born Frank James Cooper; May 7, 1901 – May 13, 1961) was an American actor known for his strong, silent screen persona and understated acting style. The American Film Institute (AFI) ranked Cooper at number 11 on its list of the 50 greatest screen legends. He won the Academy Award for Best Actor for Sergeant York (1941) and High Noon (1952) and an Academy Honorary Award in 1961.

Cooper's career spanned 36 years, from 1925 to 1961, and included leading roles in 84 feature films. He was a major movie star from the end of the silent film era through almost the end of the golden age of classical Hollywood. His screen persona appealed strongly to both men and women, and his range included roles in most major film genres. His ability to project his own personality onto the characters he played contributed to his natural and authentic appearance on screen. Throughout his career, he sustained a screen persona that represented the ideal American hero.

Cooper began his career as a film extra and stunt rider, but soon landed acting roles. After establishing himself as a Western hero in his early silent films, he became a movie star with his first sound picture, playing the title role in 1929's The Virginian. In the early 1930s, he expanded his heroic image to include more cautious characters in adventure films and dramas such as A Farewell to Arms (1932) and The Lives of a Bengal Lancer (1935). During the height of his career, Cooper portrayed a new type of hero, a champion of the common man in films such as Mr. Deeds Goes to Town (1936), Meet John Doe, Ball of Fire (both 1941), The Pride of the Yankees (1942), and For Whom the Bell Tolls (1943). He later portrayed more mature characters at odds with the world in films such as The Fountainhead (1949). In his final films, he played nonviolent characters searching for redemption in films such as Friendly Persuasion (1956) and Man of the West (1958).

== Early life ==
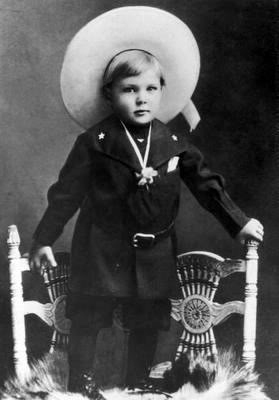
Cooper dressed as a cowboy, 1903

Frank James Cooper was born on May 7, 1901, in Helena, Montana, the younger of two sons of English immigrants, Alice (née Brazier) and Charles Henry Cooper. His brother, Arthur, was six years his senior. Cooper's father came from Houghton Regis in Bedfordshire, and was a prominent lawyer, rancher, and Montana Supreme Court justice. His mother hailed from Gillingham in Kent, and married Charles in Montana. In 1906, Charles purchased the 600-acre (240 ha) Seven-Bar-Nine cattle ranch, about fifty miles (80 km) north of Helena, near Craig. Cooper and Arthur spent their summers at the ranch and learned to ride horses, hunt and fish. Cooper attended Central Grade School in Helena.

Alice wanted their sons to have a British education, so she took them back to the United Kingdom in 1909 to enroll them in Dunstable Grammar School in Dunstable, England. While there, Cooper and his brother lived with their father's cousins, William and Emily Barton, at their home in Houghton Regis. Cooper studied Latin, French and English history at Dunstable until 1912. While he adapted to English school discipline and learned the requisite social graces, he never adjusted to the formal Eton collars he was required to wear. He received his confirmation in the Church of England at the Church of All Saints in Houghton Regis on December 3, 1911. His mother accompanied their sons back to the U.S. in August 1912 and Cooper resumed his education in Montana, at Johnson Grammar School in Helena.

At age 15, Cooper injured his hip in a car accident. On his doctor's recommendation, he returned to the Seven-Bar-Nine ranch to recuperate with horseback riding. The misguided therapy left Cooper with his characteristic stiff, off-balanced walk and slightly angled horse-riding style. He left Helena High School after two years in 1918 and returned to the family ranch to work full-time as a cowboy. In 1919, his father arranged for his son to attend Gallatin County High School in Bozeman, where English teacher Ida Davis encouraged him to focus on academics and participate in debating and dramatics. Cooper later called Davis "the woman partly responsible for [his] giving up cowboy-ing and going to college".

While in high school in 1920, Cooper took three art courses at Montana Agricultural College (now Montana State University) in Bozeman. His interest in art was inspired years earlier by the Western paintings of Charles Marion Russell and Frederic Remington. Cooper especially admired and studied Russell's Lewis and Clark Meeting Indians at Ross' Hole (1910), which still hangs in the state capitol building in Helena.

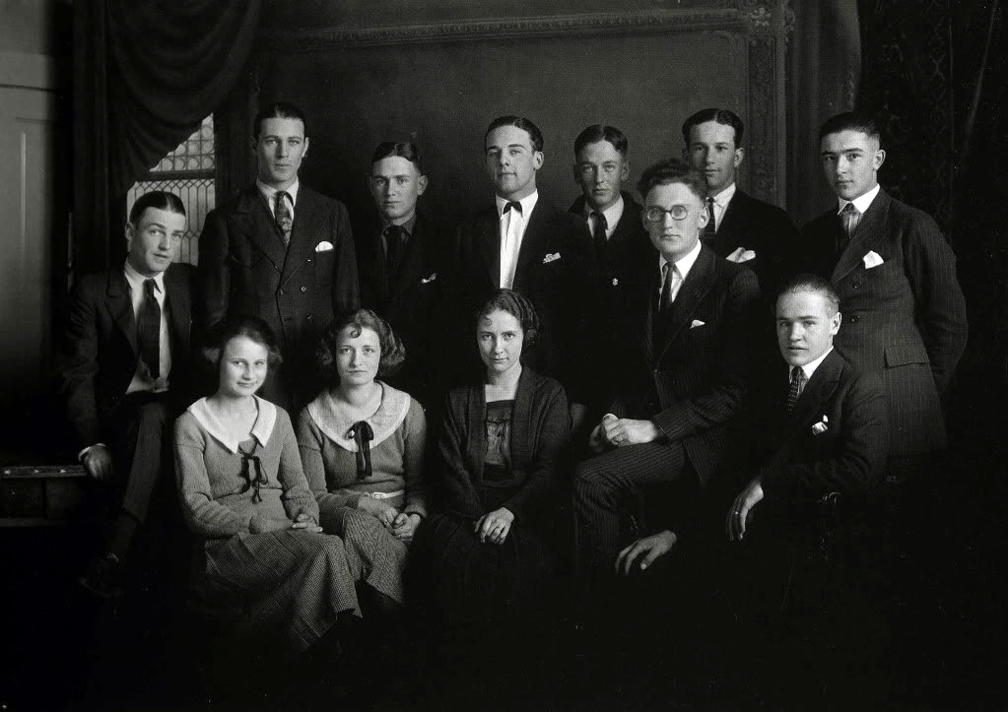
Cooper at Grinnell College (top row, second from the left), 1922

In 1922, to continue his art education, Cooper enrolled in Grinnell College in Grinnell, Iowa. He did well academically in most of his courses but was not accepted into the school's drama club. His drawings and watercolor paintings were exhibited throughout the dormitory and he was named art editor for the college yearbook. During the summers of 1922 and 1923, Cooper worked at Yellowstone National Park as a tour guide driving the yellow open-top buses. Despite a promising first 18 months at Grinnell, he left college suddenly in February 1924, spent a month in Chicago looking for work as an artist, and then returned to Helena, where he sold editorial cartoons to the local Independent newspaper.

In autumn 1924, Cooper's father left the state supreme court bench and moved with his wife to Los Angeles to administer the estates of two relatives, and Cooper joined his parents there in November at his father's request. After briefly working a series of unpromising jobs, he met two friends from Montana, who were working as film extras and stunt riders in low-budget Western films for the small movie studios on Poverty Row. They introduced him to another Montana cowboy, rodeo champion Jay "Slim" Talbot, who took him to see a casting director. Wanting money for a professional art course, Cooper worked as a film extra for five dollars a day and as a stunt rider for $10. Cooper and Talbot became close friends and hunting companions; Talbot later worked as Cooper's stuntman and stand-in for over three decades.

== Career ==
=== Silent films, 1925–1928 ===
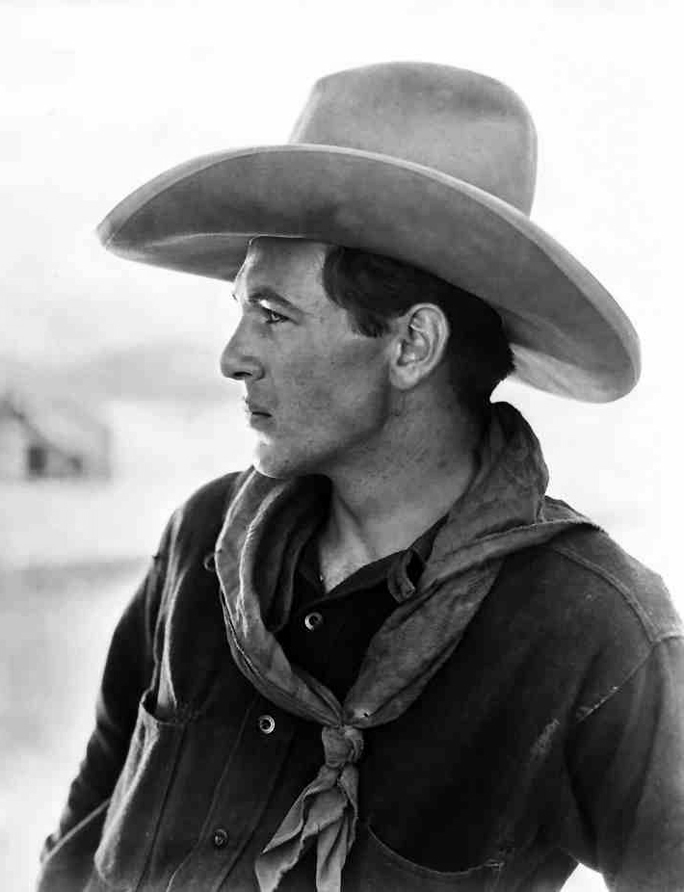
Cooper in The Winning of Barbara Worth, 1926

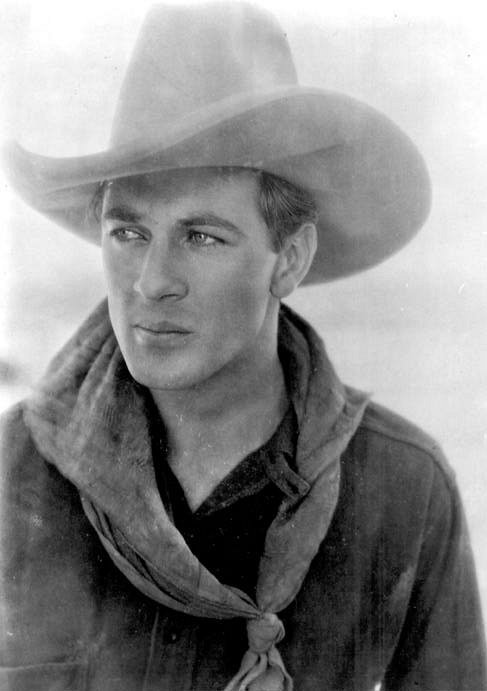
Cooper in The Winning of Barbara Worth, 1926

In early 1925, Cooper began his film career in silent pictures such as The Thundering Herd and Wild Horse Mesa with Jack Holt, Riders of the Purple Sage and The Lucky Horseshoe with Tom Mix, and The Trail Rider with Buck Jones. He worked for several Poverty Row studios, but also the already emergent major studios, Famous Players–Lasky and Fox Film Corporation. While his skilled horsemanship led to steady work in Westerns, Cooper found the stunt work, which sometimes injured horses and riders, "tough and cruel". Hoping to move beyond the risky stunt work and obtain acting roles, Cooper paid for a screen test and hired casting director Nan Collins to work as his agent. Knowing that other actors were using the name "Frank Cooper", Collins suggested he change his first name to "Gary" after her hometown of Gary, Indiana. Cooper immediately liked the name. (Note: Cooper's popularity is largely responsible for that of the given name Gary from the 1930s to the present day.)

Cooper also found work in a variety of non-Western films, appearing, for example, as a masked Cossack in The Eagle (1925), as a Roman guard in Ben-Hur (1925), and as a flood survivor in The Johnstown Flood (1926). Gradually, he began to land credited roles that offered him more screen time, in films such as Tricks (1925), in which he played the film's antagonist, and the short film Lightnin' Wins (1926). As a featured player, he began to attract the attention of major film studios. On June 1, 1926, Cooper signed a contract with Samuel Goldwyn Productions for $50 a week.

Cooper's first important film role was a supporting part in The Winning of Barbara Worth (1926) starring Ronald Colman and Vilma Bánky, in which he plays a young engineer who helps a rival suitor save the woman he loves and her town from an impending dam disaster. Cooper's experience living among the Montana cowboys gave his performance an "instinctive authenticity", according to biographer Jeffrey Meyers. The film was a major success. Critics singled out Cooper as a "dynamic new personality" and future star. Goldwyn rushed to offer Cooper a long-term contract, but he held out for a better deal – a five-year contract with Jesse L. Lasky at Paramount Pictures for $175 a week. In 1927, with help from Clara Bow, Cooper landed high-profile roles in Children of Divorce and Wings (both 1927), the latter being the first film to win an Academy Award for Best Picture. That year, Cooper also appeared in his first starring roles in Arizona Bound and Nevada, both films directed by John Waters.

Paramount paired Cooper with Fay Wray in The Legion of the Condemned and The First Kiss (both 1928), advertising them as the studio's "glorious young lovers". Their on-screen chemistry failed to generate much excitement with audiences. With each new film, Cooper's acting skills improved and his popularity continued to grow, especially among female movie-goers. During this time, he was earning as much as $2,750 per film and receiving 1,000 fan letters a week. Looking to exploit Cooper's growing audience appeal, the studio placed him opposite popular leading ladies such as Evelyn Brent in Beau Sabreur, Florence Vidor in Doomsday, and Esther Ralston in Half a Bride (all 1928). Around the same time, Cooper made Lilac Time (1928) with Colleen Moore for First National Pictures, his first movie with synchronized music and sound effects. It became one of the most commercially successful films of 1928.

=== Hollywood stardom, 1929–1935 ===
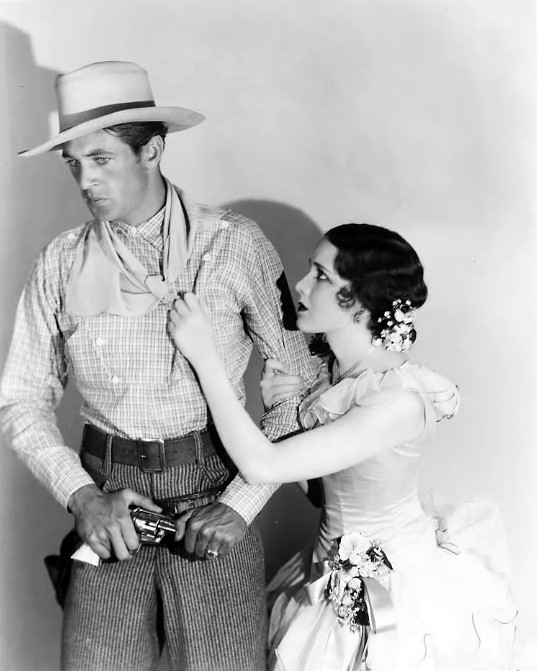
Cooper and Mary Brian in The Virginian, 1929

Cooper became a major movie star in 1929 playing the lead role in his first talking picture, The Virginian (1929), which was directed by Victor Fleming and co-starred Mary Brian and Walter Huston. Based on the popular novel by Owen Wister, The Virginian was one of the first sound films to define the Western code of honor and helped establish many of the conventions of the Western movie genre that persist to the present day. According to biographer Jeffrey Meyers, the romantic image of the tall, handsome, and shy cowboy hero who embodied male freedom, courage, and honor was created in large part by Cooper in the film. Unlike some silent-film actors who had trouble adapting to the new sound medium, Cooper transitioned naturally, with his "deep and clear" and "pleasantly drawling" voice, which perfectly suited the characters he portrayed on screen. Looking to capitalize on Cooper's growing popularity, Paramount cast him in several Westerns and wartime dramas, including Only the Brave, The Texan, Seven Days' Leave, A Man from Wyoming, and The Spoilers (all released in 1930). Norman Rockwell depicted Cooper in his role as The Texan for the cover of The Saturday Evening Post on May 24, 1930.

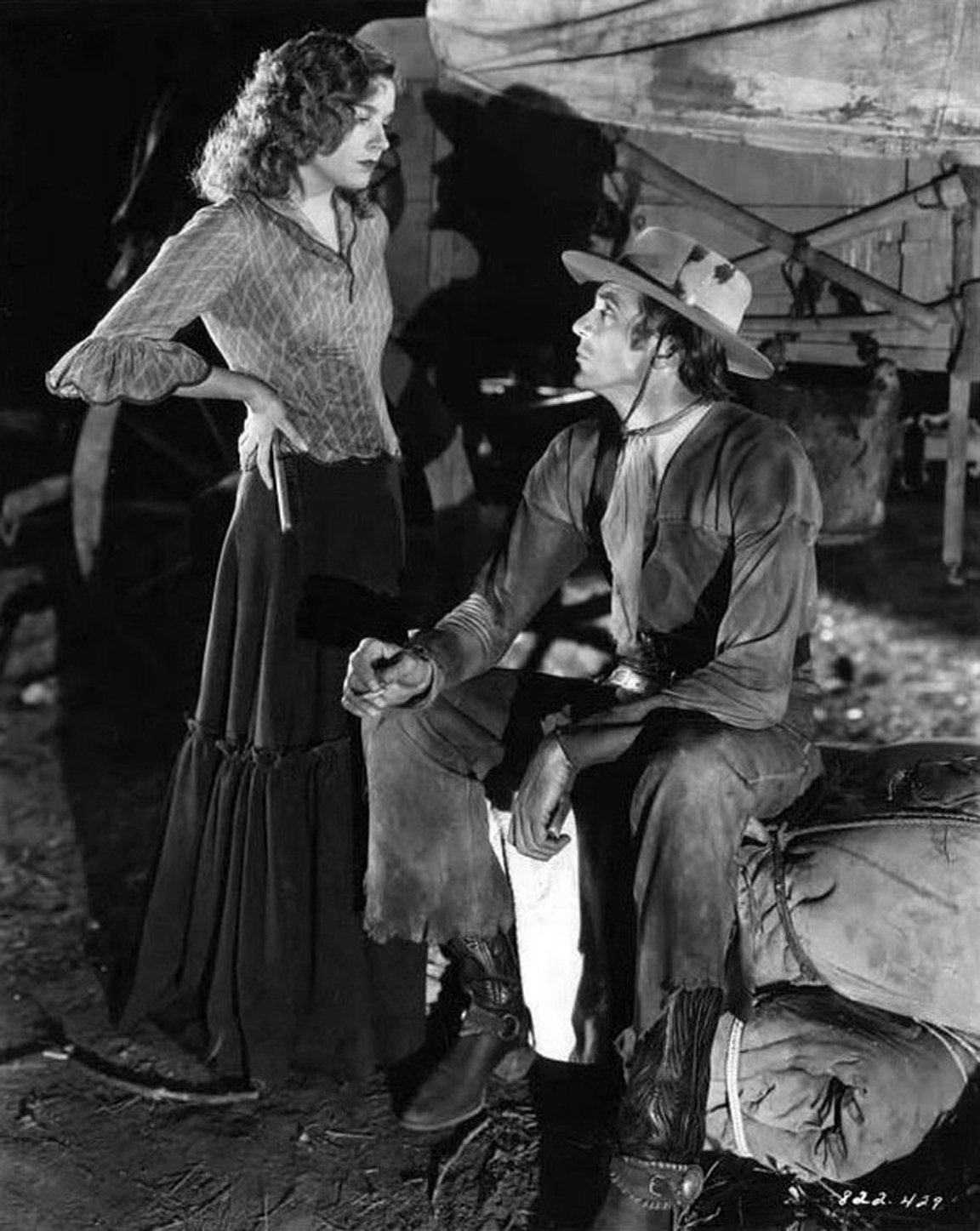
Lili Damita and Cooper in Fighting Caravans, 1931

One of the most important performances in Cooper's early career was his portrayal of a sullen legionnaire in Josef von Sternberg's film Morocco (also 1930) with Marlene Dietrich in her introduction to American audiences. During production, von Sternberg focused his energies on Dietrich and treated Cooper dismissively. Tensions came to a head after von Sternberg yelled directions at Cooper in German. The 6-foot-3-inch (191 cm) actor approached the 5-foot-4-inch (163 cm) director, picked him up by the collar, and said, "If you expect to work in this country, you'd better get on to the language we use here." Despite the tensions on the set, Cooper produced "one of his best performances", according to Thornton Delehanty of the New York Evening Post.

After returning to the Western genre in Zane Grey's Fighting Caravans (1931) with French actress Lili Damita, Cooper appeared in the Dashiell Hammett crime film City Streets (also 1931), co-starring Sylvia Sidney and Paul Lukas, playing a westerner who gets involved with big-city gangsters to save the woman he loves. Cooper concluded the year with appearances in two unsuccessful films: I Take This Woman (also 1931) with Carole Lombard, and His Woman with Claudette Colbert. The demands and pressures of making 10 films in two years left Cooper exhausted and in poor health, suffering from anemia and jaundice. He had lost 30 lb (14 kg), and felt lonely, isolated, and depressed by his sudden fame and wealth. In May 1931, Cooper left Hollywood and sailed to Algiers and then Italy, where he lived for the next year.

During his time abroad, Cooper stayed with the Countess Dorothy di Frasso, the former Dorothy Cadwell Taylor, at the Villa Madama in Rome, where she taught him about good food and vintage wines, how to read Italian and French menus, and how to socialize among Europe's nobility and upper classes. After guiding him through the great art museums and galleries of Italy, she accompanied him on a 10-week big-game hunting safari on the slopes of Mount Kenya in East Africa, where he was credited with more than 60 kills, including two lions, a rhinoceros, and various antelopes. His safari experience in Africa had a profound influence on Cooper and intensified his love of the wilderness. After returning to Europe, the countess and he set off on a Mediterranean cruise of the Italian and French Rivieras. Rested and rejuvenated by his year-long exile, a healthy Cooper returned to Hollywood in April 1932 and negotiated a new contract with Paramount for two films per year, a salary of $4,000 a week, and director and script approval.

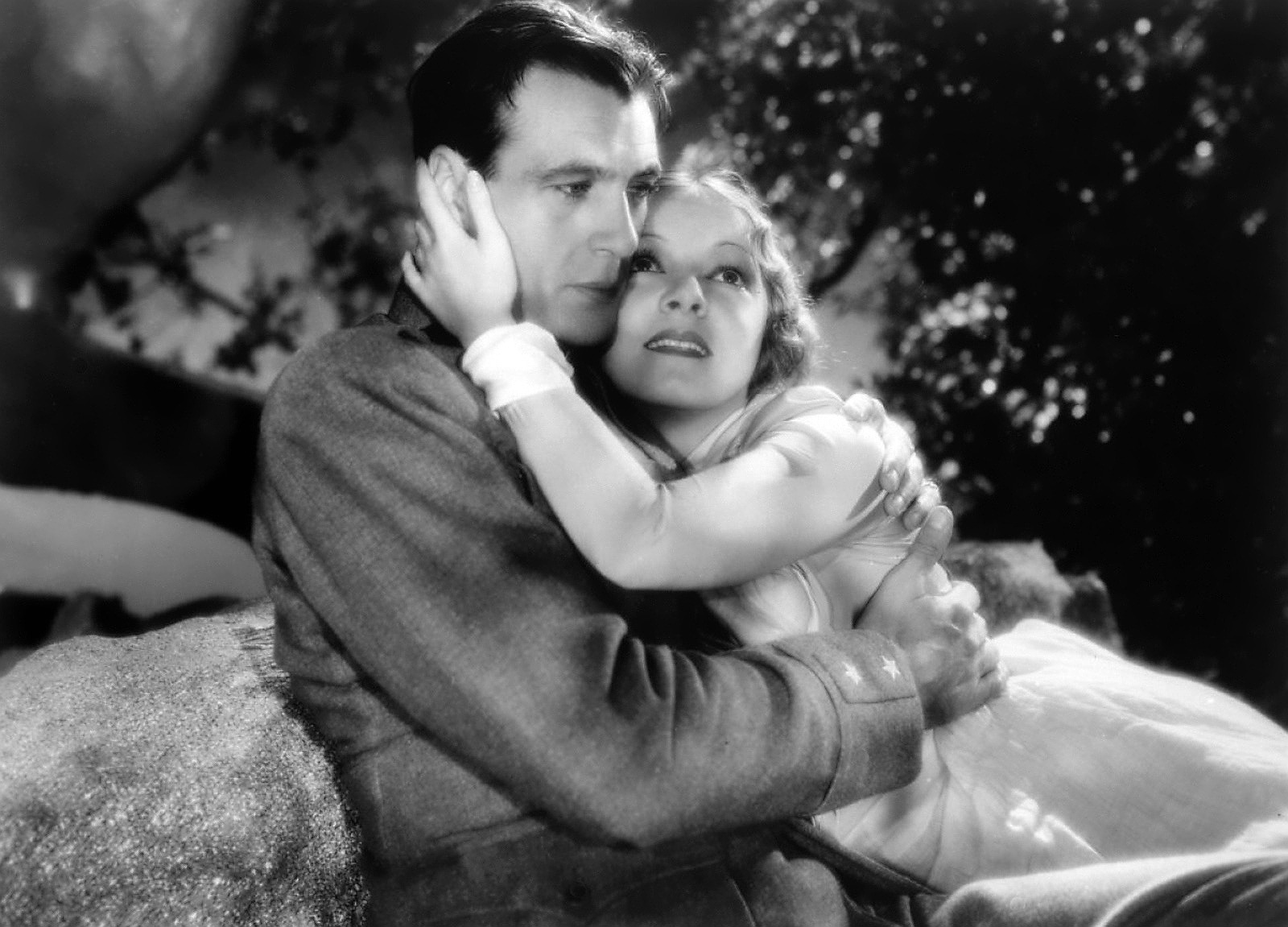
Cooper and Helen Hayes in A Farewell to Arms, 1932

In 1932, after completing Devil and the Deep with Tallulah Bankhead to fulfill his old contract, Cooper appeared in A Farewell to Arms, the first film adaptation of an Ernest Hemingway novel. Co-starring Helen Hayes, a leading New York theatre star and Academy Award winner, and Adolphe Menjou, the film presented Cooper with one of his most ambitious and challenging dramatic roles, playing an American ambulance driver wounded in Italy, who falls in love with an English nurse during World War I. Critics praised his highly intense and emotional performance, and the film became one of the year's most commercially successful pictures. In 1933, after making Today We Live with Joan Crawford and One Sunday Afternoon with Fay Wray, Cooper appeared in the Ernst Lubitsch comedy film Design for Living, based on the successful Noël Coward play. Co-starring Miriam Hopkins and Fredric March, the film was a box-office success, ranking as one of the top-10 highest-grossing films of 1933. All three of the lead actors—March, Cooper, and Hopkins—received attention from this film, as they were all at the peak of their careers. Cooper's performance as an American artist in Europe competing with his playwright friend for the affections of a beautiful woman was singled out for its versatility and revealed his genuine ability to do light comedy. Cooper changed his name legally to "Gary Cooper" in August 1933.

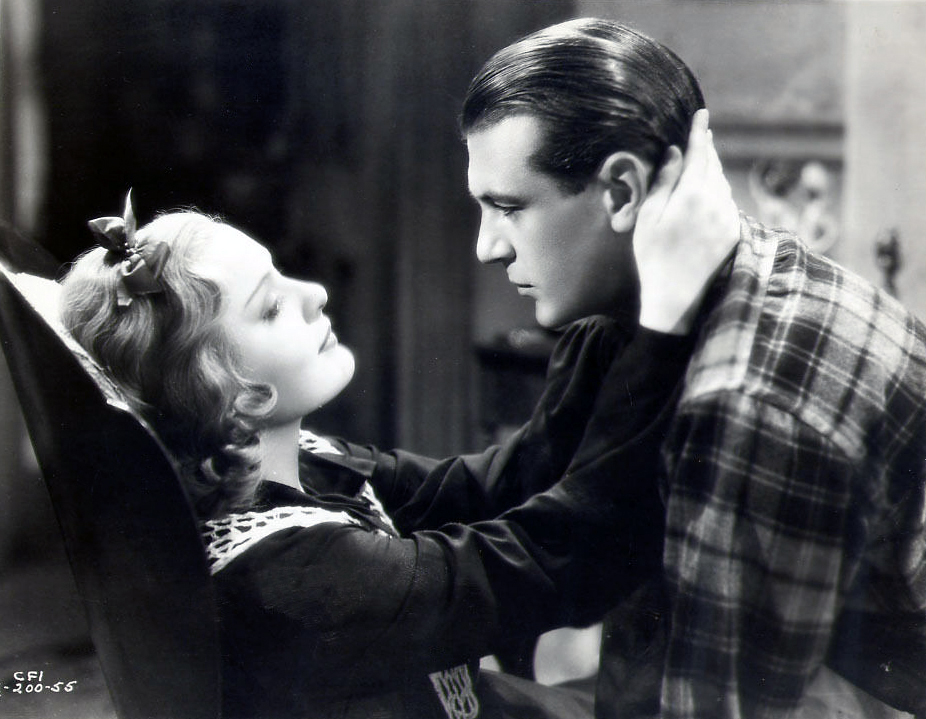
Anna Sten and Cooper in The Wedding Night, 1935

In 1934, Cooper was lent out to MGM for the Civil War drama film Operator 13 with Marion Davies, about a beautiful Union spy who falls in love with a Confederate soldier. Despite Richard Boleslawski's imaginative direction and George J. Folsey's lavish cinematography, the film did poorly at the box office.

Back at Paramount, Cooper appeared in his first of seven films by director Henry Hathaway, Now and Forever, with Carole Lombard and Shirley Temple. In the film, he plays a confidence man who tries to sell his daughter to the relatives who raised her, but is eventually won over by the adorable girl. Impressed by Temple's intelligence and charm, Cooper developed a close rapport with her, both on and off screen. (Note: Cooper bought the child actress toys and taught her how to draw using colored pencils during setups. He found it mildly irritating to be corrected by the five-year-old, who knew everyone's lines.) The film was a box-office success.

In 1935, Cooper was lent to Samuel Goldwyn Productions to appear in King Vidor's romance film The Wedding Night with Anna Sten, who was being groomed as "another Garbo". In the film, Cooper plays an alcoholic novelist who retreats to his family's New England farm, where he meets and falls in love with a beautiful Polish neighbor. Cooper delivered a performance of surprising range and depth, according to biographer Larry Swindell. Despite receiving generally favorable reviews, the film was not popular with American audiences, who may have been offended by the film's depiction of an extramarital affair and its tragic ending.

Also in 1935, Cooper appeared in two Henry Hathaway films: the melodrama Peter Ibbetson with Ann Harding, about a man caught up in a dream world created by his love for a childhood sweetheart, and the adventure film The Lives of a Bengal Lancer, about a daring British officer and his men who defend their stronghold at Bengal against rebellious local tribes. While the former, championed by the surrealists became more successful in Europe than in the United States, the latter was nominated for seven Academy Awards and became one of Cooper's most popular and successful adventure films. Hathaway had the highest respect for Cooper's acting ability, calling him "the best actor of all of them".

=== American folk hero, 1936–1943 ===
==== From Mr. Deeds to The Real Glory, 1936–1939 ====
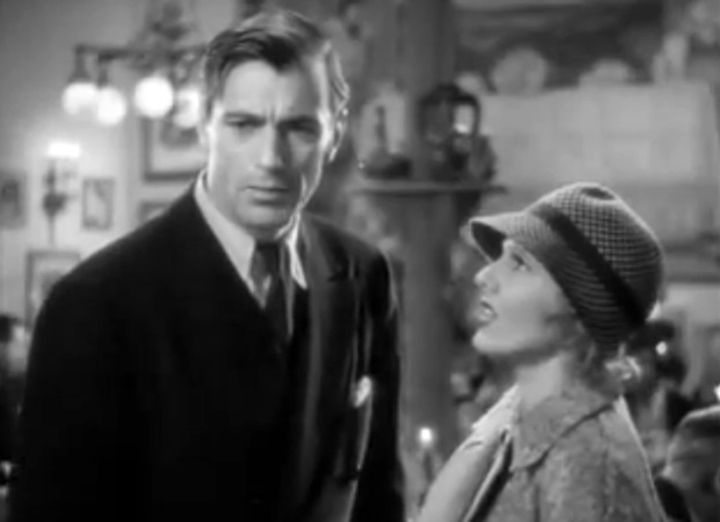
Cooper and Jean Arthur in Mr. Deeds Goes to Town, 1936

Cooper's career took an important turn in 1936. After making Frank Borzage's romantic comedy film Desire at Paramount, in which he co-starred again with Marlene Dietrich and delivered a performance considered by some contemporary critics as one of his finest, he returned to Poverty Row for the first time since his early silent-film days to make Frank Capra's Mr. Deeds Goes to Town with Jean Arthur for Columbia Pictures. In the film, Cooper plays Longfellow Deeds, a quiet, innocent writer of greeting cards who inherits a fortune, leaves behind his idyllic life in Vermont, and travels to New York City, where he faces a world of corruption and deceit. Capra and screenwriter Robert Riskin were able to use Cooper's well-established screen persona as the "quintessential American hero"—a symbol of honesty, courage, and goodness—to create a new type of "folk hero" for the common man. Of Cooper's impact on the character and the film, Capra said:

As soon as I thought of Gary Cooper, it wasn't possible to conceive anyone else in the role. He could not have been any closer to my idea of Longfellow Deeds, and as soon as he could think in terms of Cooper, Bob Riskin found it easier to develop the Deeds character in terms of dialogue. So it just had to be Cooper. Every line in his face spelled honesty. Our Mr. Deeds had to symbolize incorruptibility, and in my mind Gary Cooper was that symbol.

Both Desire and Mr. Deeds opened in April 1936 to critical praise and were major box-office successes. In his review in The New York Times, Frank Nugent wrote that Cooper was "proving himself one of the best light comedians in Hollywood". For his performance in Mr. Deeds, Cooper received his first Academy Award nomination for Best Actor.

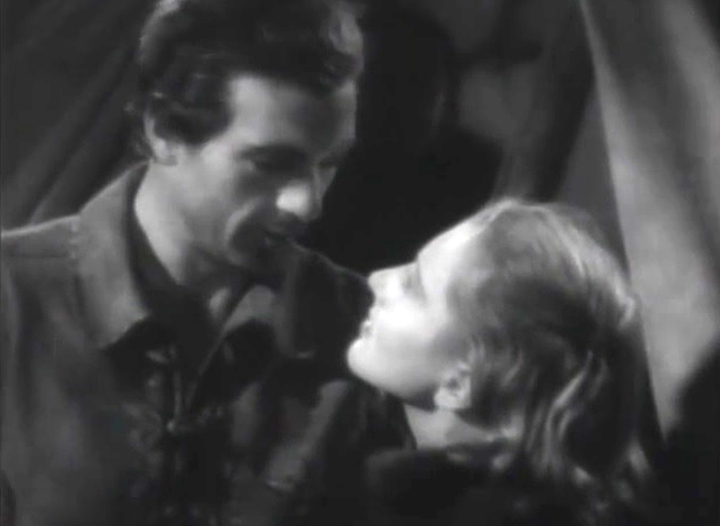
Cooper and Jean Arthur in The Plainsman, 1936

Cooper appeared in two other Paramount films in 1936. In Lewis Milestone's adventure film The General Died at Dawn with Madeleine Carroll, he plays an American soldier of fortune in China who helps the peasants defend themselves against the oppression of a cruel warlord. Written by playwright Clifford Odets, the film was a critical and commercial success.

In Cecil B. DeMille's sprawling frontier epic The Plainsman, his first of four films with the director, Cooper portrays Wild Bill Hickok in a highly fictionalized version of the opening of the American western frontier. The film was an even greater box-office hit than its predecessor, due in large part to Jean Arthur's definitive depiction of Calamity Jane and Cooper's inspired portrayal of Hickok as an enigmatic figure of "deepening mythic substance". That year, Cooper appeared for the first time on the Motion Picture Herald exhibitor's poll of top-10 film personalities, where he remained for the next 23 years.

In late 1936, Paramount was preparing a new contract for Cooper that would raise his salary to $8,000 a week, when Cooper signed a contract with Samuel Goldwyn for six films over six years with a minimum guarantee of $150,000 per picture. Paramount brought suit against Goldwyn and Cooper, and the court ruled that Cooper's new Goldwyn contract afforded the actor sufficient time to also honor his Paramount agreement. Cooper continued to make films with both studios, and by 1939, the United States Treasury reported that Cooper was the country's highest wage earner, at $482,819 (equivalent to $11.18 million in 2025).

In contrast to his output the previous year, Cooper appeared in only one picture in 1937, Henry Hathaway's adventure film Souls at Sea. A critical and box-office failure, Cooper called it an "almost picture", saying, "It was almost exciting, and almost interesting. And I was almost good." In 1938, he appeared in Archie Mayo's biographical film The Adventures of Marco Polo. Plagued by production problems and a weak screenplay, the film became Goldwyn's biggest failure to date, losing $700,000. During this period, Cooper turned down several important roles, including that of Rhett Butler in Gone with the Wind. Cooper was producer David O. Selznick's first choice for the part. Selznick made several overtures to Cooper, but Cooper had doubts about the project and did not feel suited to the role. He later said: "It was one of the best roles ever offered in Hollywood ... But I said no. I didn't see myself as quite that dashing, and later, when I saw Clark Gable play the role to perfection, I knew I was right." (Note: Cooper also turned down the leading roles in John Ford's Stagecoach (1939) and Alfred Hitchcock's Foreign Correspondent (1940).)

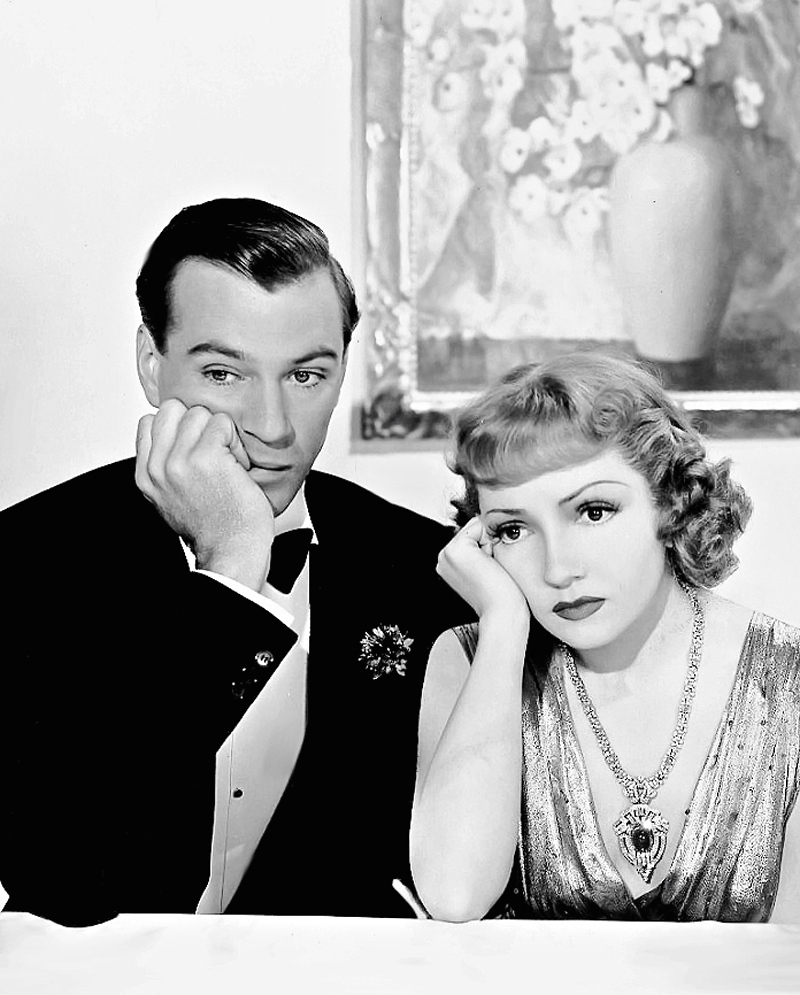
Cooper and Claudette Colbert in Bluebeard's Eighth Wife, 1938

Back at Paramount, Cooper returned to a more comfortable genre in Ernst Lubitsch's romantic comedy Bluebeard's Eighth Wife (1938) with Claudette Colbert. Cooper plays a wealthy American businessman in France who falls in love with an impoverished aristocrat's daughter and persuades her to become his eighth wife. Despite the clever screenplay by Charles Brackett and Billy Wilder and solid performances by Cooper and Colbert, American audiences had trouble accepting Cooper in the role of a shallow philanderer. It succeeded only at the European box-office market.

In the fall of 1938, Cooper appeared in H. C. Potter's romantic comedy The Cowboy and the Lady with Merle Oberon, about a sweet-natured rodeo cowboy who falls in love with the wealthy daughter of a presidential hopeful, believing her to be a poor, hard-working lady's maid. While more successful than its predecessor, the film was Cooper's fourth consecutive box-office failure in the American market.

In the next two years, Cooper was more discerning about the roles he accepted and made four successful large-scale adventure and cowboy films. In William A. Wellman's adventure film Beau Geste (1939), he plays one of three daring English brothers who join the French Foreign Legion in the Sahara to fight local tribes. Filmed in the same Mojave Desert locations as the original 1926 version with Ronald Colman, Beau Geste provided Cooper with magnificent sets, exotic settings, high-spirited action, and a role tailored to his personality and screen persona. This was the last film in Cooper's contract with Paramount.

In Henry Hathaway's The Real Glory (1939), Cooper plays a military doctor who accompanies a small group of U.S. Army officers to the Philippines to help the Christian Filipinos defend themselves against Muslim radicals. Many critics praised Cooper's performance, including author and film critic Graham Greene, who said he "never acted better".

==== From The Westerner to For Whom the Bell Tolls, 1940–1943 ====
Cooper returned to the Western genre in William Wyler's The Westerner (1940) with Walter Brennan and Doris Davenport, about a drifting cowboy who defends homesteaders against Roy Bean, a corrupt judge known as the "law west of the Pecos". Screenwriter Niven Busch relied on Cooper's extensive knowledge of Western history while working on the script. The film received positive reviews and did well at the box office, with reviewers praising the two lead actors' performances. That same year, Cooper appeared in his first all-Technicolor feature, Cecil B. DeMille's adventure film North West Mounted Police (1940). (Note: Cooper previously appeared in the all-star feature Paramount on Parade (1930), which included scenes in two-color Technicolor, including his "Let Us Drink to the Girl of My Dreams" sequence. He also appeared as himself in the Technicolor short films Star Night at the Coconut Grove (1935) and La Fiesta de Santa Barbara (1936).) Cooper plays a Texas Ranger who pursues an outlaw into western Canada, where he joins forces with the Royal Canadian Mounted Police who are after the same man, a leader of the North-West Rebellion. While not as popular with critics as its predecessor, the film was another box-office success, the sixth-highest grossing film of 1940.

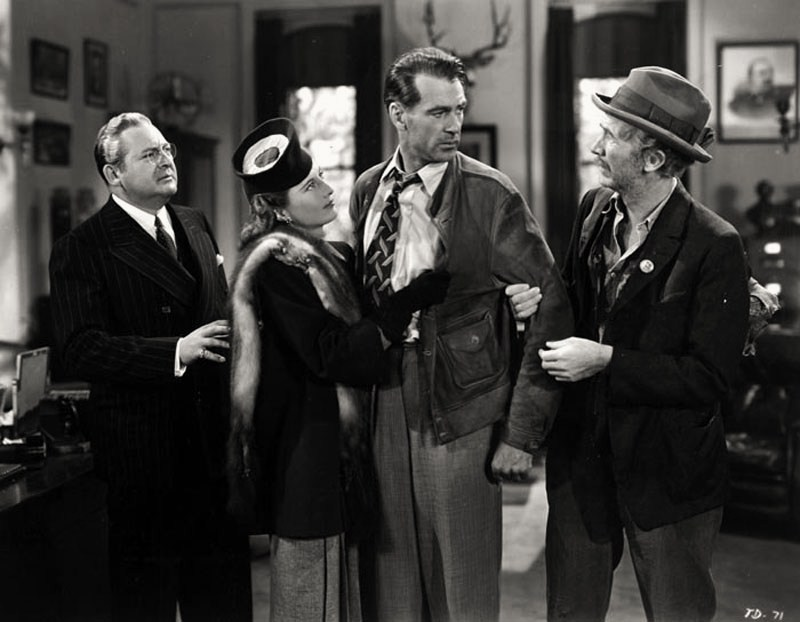
Edward Arnold, Barbara Stanwyck, Cooper, and Walter Brennan in Meet John Doe, 1941

The early 1940s were Cooper's prime years as an actor. In a relatively short period, he appeared in five critically successful and popular films that produced some of his finest performances. When Frank Capra offered him the lead role in Meet John Doe before Robert Riskin even developed the script, Cooper accepted the offer, saying, "It's okay, Frank, I don't need a script." Cooper plays Long John Willoughby, a down-and-out bush-league pitcher hired by a newspaper to pretend to be a man who promises to commit suicide on Christmas Eve to protest all the hypocrisy and corruption in the country. Considered by some critics to be Capra's best film at the time, Meet John Doe was received as a "national event" with Cooper appearing on the front cover of Time on March 3, 1941. In his review in the New York Herald Tribune, Howard Barnes called Cooper's performance a "splendid and utterly persuasive portrayal" and praised his "utterly realistic acting which comes through with such authority". In The New York Times, Bosley Crowther wrote, "Gary Cooper, of course, is 'John Doe' to the life and in the whole—shy, bewildered, nonaggressive, but a veritable tiger when aroused."

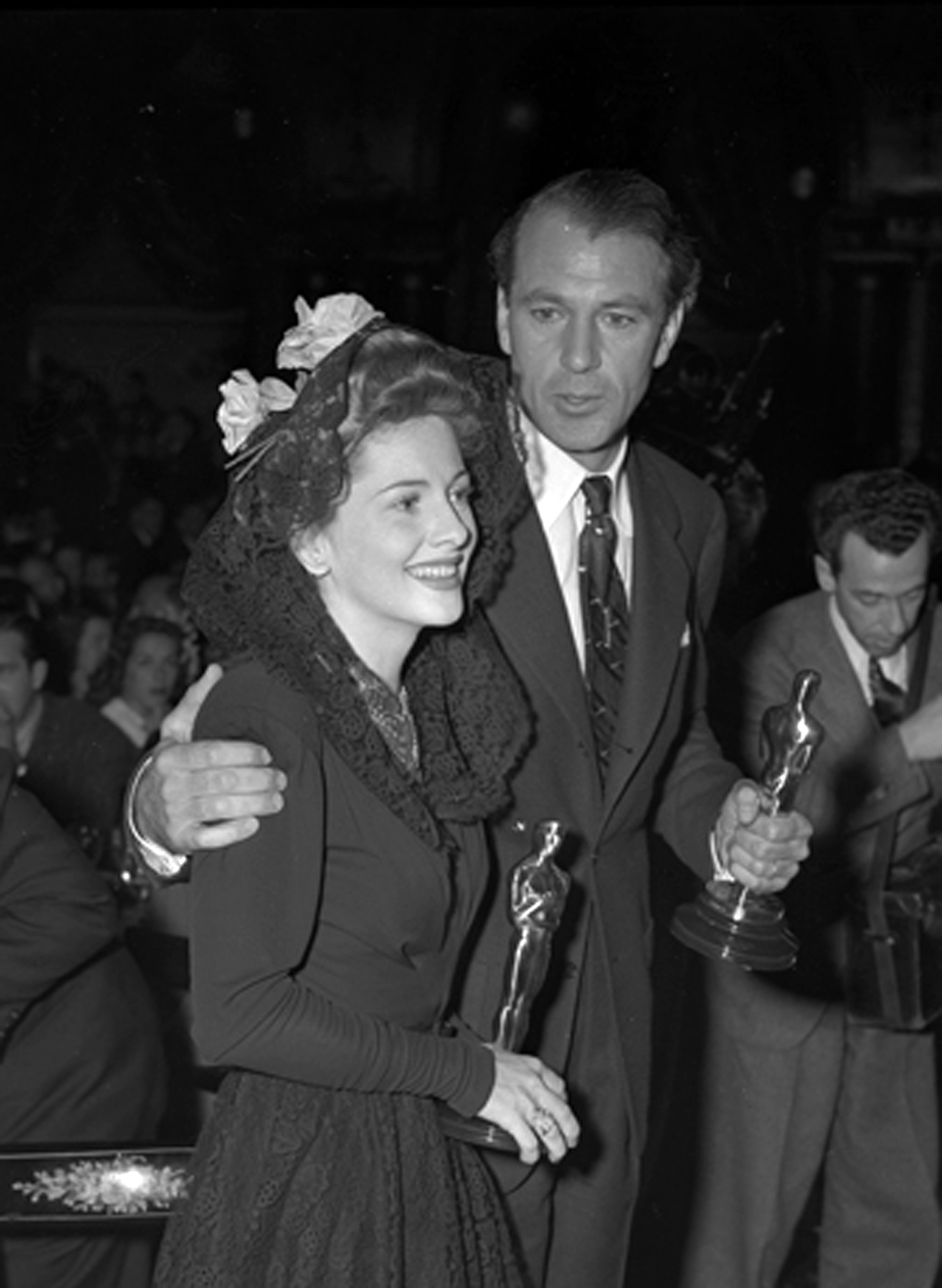
Joan Fontaine and Cooper at the Academy Awards, 1942

That same year, Cooper made two films his good friend director Howard Hawks. In the biographical film Sergeant York, Cooper plays war hero Alvin C. York, one of the most decorated American soldiers in World War I. The film chronicles York's early backwoods days in Tennessee, his religious conversion and subsequent piety, his stand as a conscientious objector, and finally his heroic actions at the Battle of the Argonne Forest, which earned him the Medal of Honor. Initially, Cooper was nervous and uncertain about playing a living hero, so he traveled to Tennessee to visit York at his home, and the two men established a rapport and discovered they had much in common. Inspired by York's encouragement, Cooper delivered a performance that Howard Barnes of the New York Herald Tribune called "one of extraordinary conviction and versatility" and that Archer Winston of the New York Post called "one of his best". After the film's release, Cooper was awarded the Distinguished Citizenship Medal by the Veterans of Foreign Wars for his "powerful contribution to the promotion of patriotism and loyalty". York admired Cooper's performance and helped promote the film for Warner Bros. Sergeant York became the top-grossing film of the year and was nominated for 11 Academy Awards. Accepting his first Academy Award for Best Actor from his friend James Stewart, Cooper said, "It was Sergeant Alvin York who won this award. Shucks, I've been in the business 16 years and sometimes dreamed I might get one of these. That's all I can say ... Funny when I was dreaming I always made a better speech."

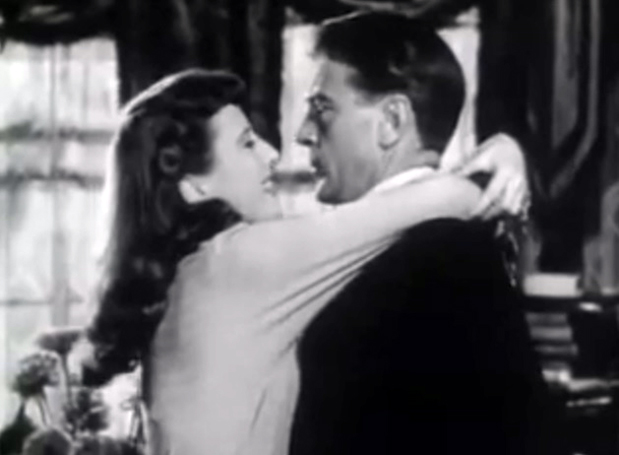
Barbara Stanwyck and Cooper in Ball of Fire, 1941

Cooper concluded the year back at Goldwyn with Hawks to make the romantic comedy Ball of Fire with Barbara Stanwyck. Cooper plays a shy linguistics professor who leads a team of seven scholars who are writing an encyclopedia. While researching slang, he meets Stanwyck's flirtatious burlesque stripper Sugarpuss O'Shea, who blows the dust off their staid life of books. The screenplay, by Charles Brackett and Billy Wilder, gave Cooper the opportunity to exercise the full range of his light comedy skills. In the New York Herald Tribune, Howard Barnes wrote that Cooper handled the role with "great skill and comic emphasis" and called his performance "utterly delightful". Though small in scale, Ball of Fire was one of the top-grossing films of the year and Cooper's fourth consecutive picture to make the top 20.

Cooper's only film appearance in 1942 was also his last under his Goldwyn contract. In Sam Wood's biographical film The Pride of the Yankees, Cooper portrays baseball star Lou Gehrig, who established a record with the New York Yankees for playing in 2,130 consecutive games. Cooper was reluctant to play the seven-time All-Star, who had died only the previous year from ALS (now commonly called "Lou Gehrig's disease"). Beyond the challenges of effectively portraying such a popular and nationally recognized figure, Cooper knew very little about baseball and was not left-handed like Gehrig.

After Gehrig's widow visited the actor and expressed her desire that he portray her husband, Cooper accepted the role that covered a 20-year span of Gehrig's life: his early love of baseball, his rise to greatness, his loving marriage, and his struggle with illness, culminating in his farewell speech at Yankee Stadium on July 4, 1939, before 62,000 fans. Cooper quickly learned the physical movements of a baseball player and developed a fluid, believable swing. The handedness issue was solved by reversing the print for certain batting scenes. The film was one of the year's top-10 pictures and received 11 Academy Award nominations, including Best Picture and Best Actor (Cooper's third).

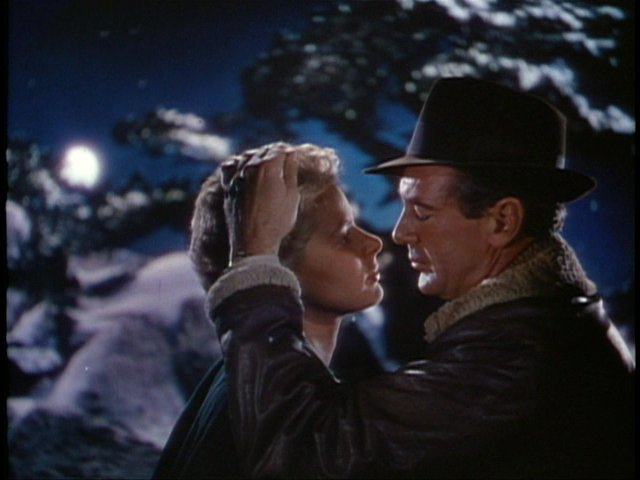
Ingrid Bergman and Cooper in For Whom the Bell Tolls, 1943

Soon after the publication of Ernest Hemingway's novel For Whom the Bell Tolls, Paramount paid $150,000 for the film rights with the express intent of casting Cooper in the lead role of Robert Jordan, an American explosives expert who fights alongside the Republican loyalists during the Spanish Civil War. The original director, Cecil B. DeMille, was replaced by Sam Wood, who brought in Dudley Nichols for the screenplay. After the start of principal photography in the Sierra Nevada in late 1942, Ingrid Bergman was brought in to replace ballerina Vera Zorina as the female lead, a change supported by Cooper and Hemingway. The love scenes between Bergman and Cooper were "rapturous" and passionate. In the New York Herald Tribune Howard Barnes wrote that both actors performed with "the true stature and authority of stars". While the film distorted the novel's original political themes and meaning, For Whom the Bell Tolls was a critical and commercial success and received 10 Academy Award nominations, including Best Picture and Best Actor (Cooper's fourth).

==== World War II related activities ====
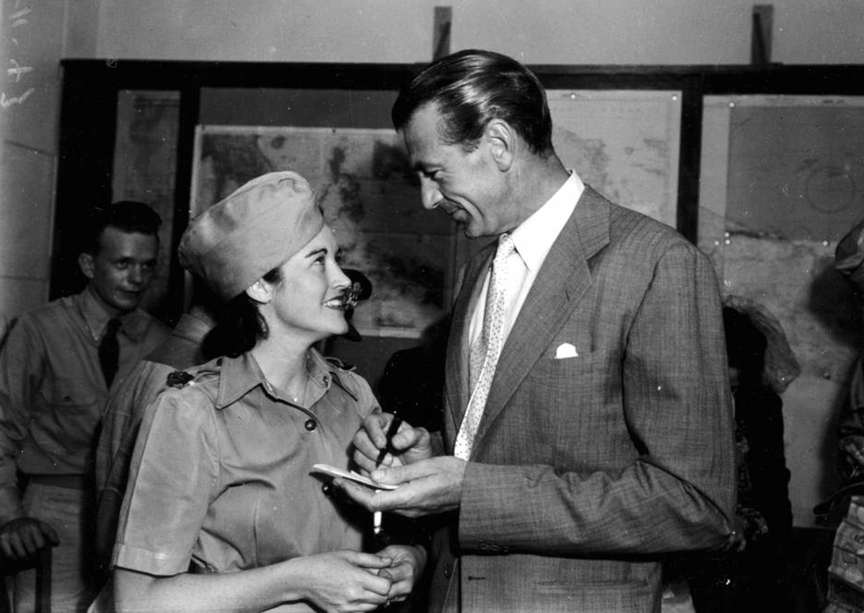
Cooper signing an autograph for a servicewoman in Brisbane during his tour of the South West Pacific, November 1943

Due to his age and health, Cooper did not serve in the military during World War II, but like many of his colleagues, he got involved in the war effort by entertaining the troops. In June 1943, he visited military hospitals in San Diego, and often appeared at the Hollywood Canteen serving food to the servicemen. In late 1943, Cooper undertook a 23,000-mile (37,000 km) tour of the South West Pacific with actresses Una Merkel and Phyllis Brooks and accordionist Andy Arcari.

Traveling on a B-24A Liberator bomber, the group toured the Cook Islands, Fiji, New Caledonia, Queensland, Brisbane—where General Douglas MacArthur told Cooper he was watching Sergeant York in a Manila theater when Japanese bombs began falling—New Guinea, and Jayapura, then throughout the Solomon Islands.

The group often shared the same sparse living conditions and K-rations as the troops. Cooper met with the servicemen and women, visited military hospitals, introduced his colleagues, and participated in occasional skits. The shows concluded with Cooper's moving recitation of Lou Gehrig's farewell speech. When he returned to the U.S., he visited military hospitals throughout the country. Cooper later called his time with the troops the "greatest emotional experience" of his life.

=== Mature roles, 1944–1952 ===
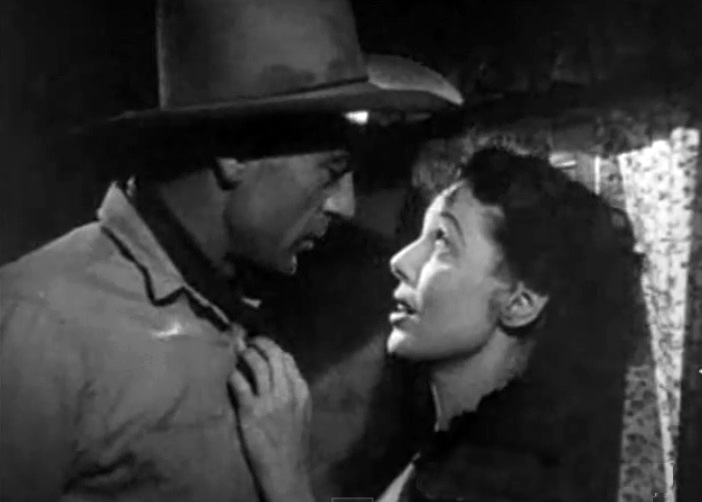
Cooper and Loretta Young in Along Came Jones, 1945

In 1944, Cooper appeared in Cecil B. DeMille's wartime adventure film The Story of Dr. Wassell, his third movie with DeMille. Cooper plays American doctor and missionary Corydon M. Wassell, who leads a group of wounded sailors through the jungles of Java to safety. Despite poor reviews, Dr. Wassell was one of the year's top-grossing films. With his Goldwyn and Paramount contracts concluded, Cooper formed his own production company, International Pictures, with Leo Spitz, William Goetz, and Nunnally Johnson. The fledgling studio's first offering was Sam Wood's romantic comedy Casanova Brown, about a man who learns his soon-to-be ex-wife is pregnant with his child just as he is about to marry another woman. The film received poor reviews, with the New York Daily News calling it "delightful nonsense", and Bosley Crowther, in The New York Times, criticizing Cooper's "somewhat obvious and ridiculous clowning". The film was barely profitable.

In 1945, Cooper starred in and produced Stuart Heisler's Western comedy Along Came Jones for International. In this lighthearted parody of his past heroic image, Cooper plays comically inept cowboy Melody Jones, who is mistaken for a ruthless killer. Audiences embraced Cooper's character, and the film was one of the year's top box-office pictures—a testament to Cooper's still vital audience appeal. It was also International's biggest financial success during its brief history before being sold off to Universal Studios in 1946.

Cooper's career during the postwar years drifted in new directions as American society was changing. While he still played conventional heroic roles, his films now relied less on his heroic screen persona and more on novel stories and exotic settings. In November 1945, Cooper appeared in Sam Wood's 19th-century period drama Saratoga Trunk, about a Texas cowboy and his relationship with a beautiful fortune hunter. Filmed in early 1943, the movie's release was delayed due to increased demand for war movies. Despite poor reviews, Saratoga Trunk did well at the box office and became one of the year's top moneymakers for Warner Bros. Cooper's only film in 1946 was Fritz Lang's romantic thriller Cloak and Dagger, about a mild-mannered physics professor recruited by the Office of Strategic Services during the last years of World War II to investigate the German atomic-bomb program. Playing a part loosely based on physicist J. Robert Oppenheimer, Cooper was uneasy with the role and unable to convey the "inner sense" of the character. The film received poor reviews and was a box-office failure. In 1947, Cooper appeared in Cecil B. DeMille's epic adventure film Unconquered, about an 18th-century Virginia militiaman who defends settlers against an unscrupulous gun trader and hostile Indians on the Western frontier. The film received mixed reviews, but even long-time DeMille critic James Agee acknowledged the picture had "some authentic flavor of the period". This last of four films made with DeMille was Cooper's most lucrative, earning him over $300,000 (equal to $4,325,633 today) in salary and percentage of profits. Unconquered was his last unqualified box-office success for the next five years.

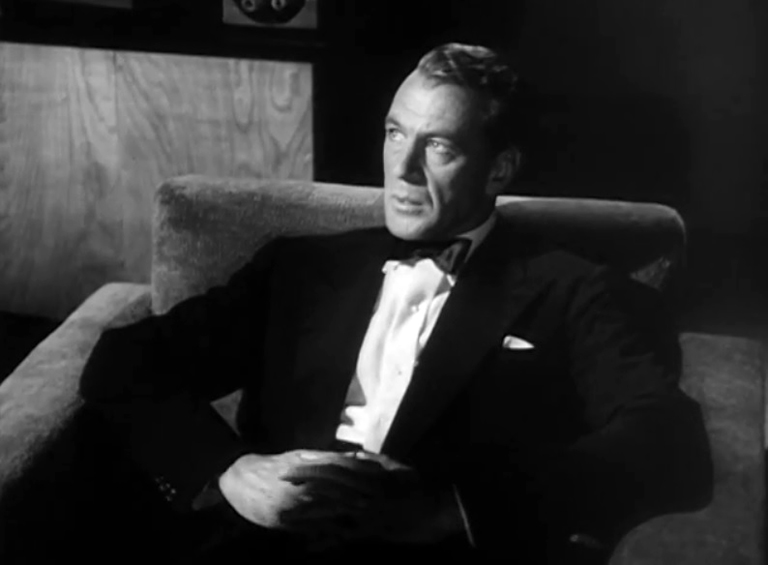
Cooper in The Fountainhead, 1949

In 1948, after making Leo McCarey's romantic comedy Good Sam, Cooper sold his company to Universal Studios and signed a long-term contract with Warner Bros. that gave him script and director approval and a guaranteed $295,000 (equal to $3,953,082 today) per picture. His first film under the new contract was King Vidor's drama The Fountainhead (1949) with Patricia Neal and Raymond Massey. Cooper plays the idealistic and uncompromising architect Howard Roark, who struggles to maintain his integrity and individualism in the face of societal pressures to conform to popular standards. Based on the novel by Ayn Rand, who also wrote the screenplay, the film reflects her philosophy and attacks the concepts of collectivism while promoting the virtues of individualism. For most critics, Cooper was hopelessly miscast as Roark. In his review for The New York Times, Bosley Crowther concluded he was "Mr. Deeds out of his element". Cooper returned to his element in Delmer Daves's war drama Task Force (1949), about a retiring rear admiral who reminisces about his long career as a naval aviator and his role in the development of aircraft carriers. Cooper's performance and the Technicolor newsreel footage supplied by the United States Navy made the film one of Cooper's most popular during this period. In the next two years, Cooper made four poorly received films: Michael Curtiz's period drama Bright Leaf (1950), Stuart Heisler's Western melodrama Dallas (1950), Henry Hathaway's wartime comedy You're in the Navy Now (1951), and Raoul Walsh's Western action film Distant Drums (1951).

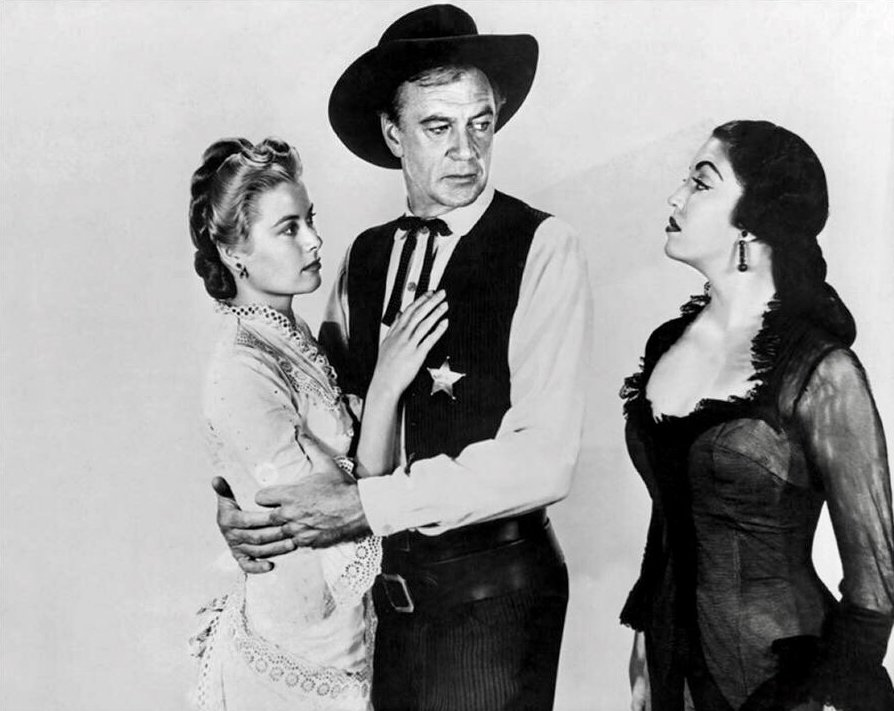
Cooper hugging Grace Kelly while Katy Jurado stares at them in High Noon, 1952

Cooper's most important film during the postwar years was Fred Zinnemann's Western drama High Noon (1952), for United Artists. Cooper plays retiring sheriff Will Kane, who is preparing to leave town on his honeymoon when he learns that an outlaw he helped put away and his three henchmen are returning to seek their revenge. Unable to gain the support of the frightened townspeople, and abandoned by his bride, Kane stays to face the outlaws alone. During the filming, Cooper was in poor health and in considerable pain from stomach ulcers. His ravaged face and discomfort in some scenes "photographed as self-doubt", according to biographer Hector Arce, and contributed to the effectiveness of his performance. Considered one of the first "adult" Westerns for its theme of moral courage, High Noon received enthusiastic reviews for its artistry, with Time ranking it with Stagecoach and The Gunfighter. In The New York Times, Bosley Crowther wrote that Cooper was "at the top of his form", and John McCarten, in The New Yorker, wrote that Cooper was never more effective. The film earned $3.75 million in the United States and $18 million worldwide. Following the example of his friend James Stewart, Cooper accepted a lower salary in exchange for a percentage of the profits, and made $600,000. His understated performance was widely praised, and earned him his second Academy Award for Best Actor. (Note: John Wayne accepted the Oscar for Cooper, who was out of the country at the time, saying, "Coop and I have been friends, hunting and fishing, for more years than I like to remember. He's one of the nicest fellows I know. I don't know anybody any nicer.")

=== Later films, 1953–1959 ===
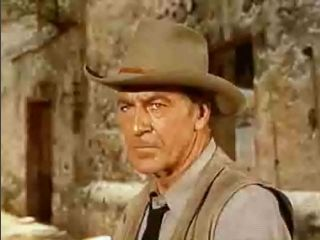
Vera Cruz (1954)

After appearing in Andre de Toth's Civil War drama Springfield Rifle (1952)—a standard Warner Bros. film overshadowed by the success of its predecessor—Cooper made four films outside the U.S. In Mark Robson's drama Return to Paradise (1953), Cooper plays an American wanderer who liberates the inhabitants of a Polynesian island from the puritanical rule of a misguided pastor. Cooper endured spartan living conditions, long hours, and ill health during the three-month shoot on the island of Upolu in Western Samoa. Despite its beautiful cinematography, the film received poor reviews. Cooper's next three films were shot in Mexico. In Hugo Fregonese's action adventure film Blowing Wild (1953), he plays a wildcatter in Mexico, who gets involved with an oil-company executive and his unscrupulous wife with whom he once had an affair.

In 1954, Cooper appeared in Henry Hathaway's Western drama Garden of Evil, about three soldiers of fortune in Mexico hired to rescue a woman's husband. That same year, he appeared in Robert Aldrich's Western adventure Vera Cruz. Cooper plays an American adventurer hired by Emperor Maximilian I to escort a countess to Vera Cruz during the Mexican Rebellion of 1866. All these films received poor reviews but did well at the box office. For his work in Vera Cruz, Cooper earned $1.4 million in salary and a percentage of the gross.

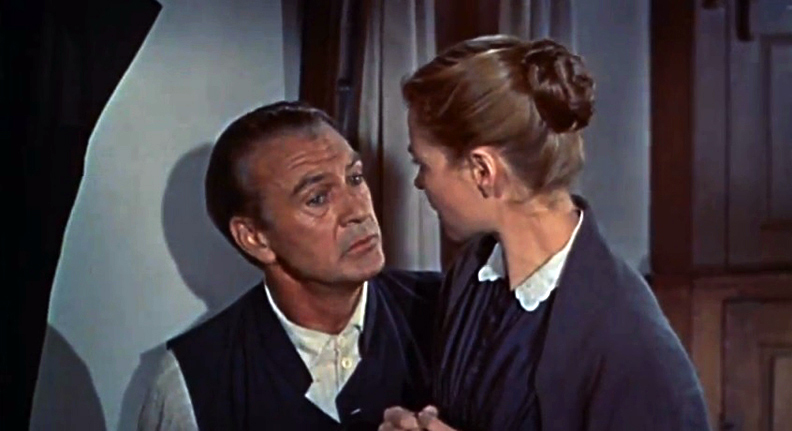
Cooper and Dorothy McGuire in Friendly Persuasion, 1956

During this period, Cooper struggled with health problems. He suffered a severe shoulder injury during the filming of Blowing Wild when he was hit by metal fragments from a dynamited oil well, as well as his ongoing treatment for ulcers. During the filming of Vera Cruz, he reinjured his hip by falling from a horse, and was burned when Lancaster fired his rifle too close and the wadding from the blank shell pierced his clothing.

Cooper appeared in Otto Preminger's 1955 biographical war drama The Court-Martial of Billy Mitchell, about the World War I general who tried to convince government officials of the importance of air power, and was court-martialed after blaming the War Department for a series of air disasters. Some critics felt Cooper was miscast, and that his dull, tight-lipped performance did not reflect Mitchell's dynamic and caustic personality. In 1956, Cooper was more effective playing a gentle Indiana Quaker in William Wyler's Civil War drama Friendly Persuasion with Dorothy McGuire. Like Sergeant York and High Noon, the film addresses the conflict between religious pacifism and civic duty. For his performance, Cooper received his second Golden Globe nomination for Best Motion Picture Actor. The film was nominated for six Academy Awards, was awarded the Palme d'Or at the 1957 Cannes Film Festival, and went on to earn $8 million worldwide.

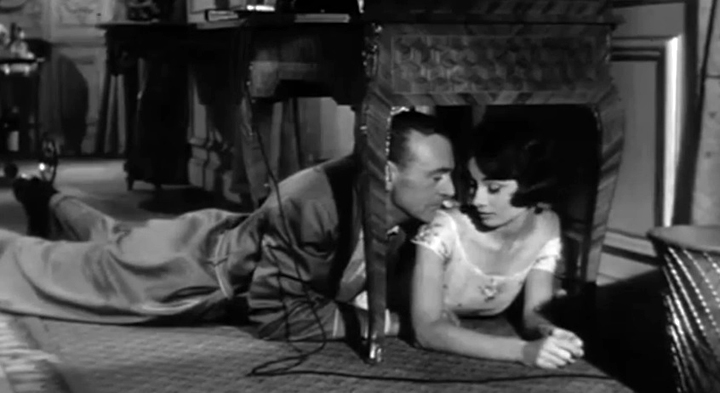
Cooper and Audrey Hepburn in Love in the Afternoon, 1957

Cooper traveled to France in 1956 to make Billy Wilder's romantic comedy Love in the Afternoon with Audrey Hepburn and Maurice Chevalier. In the film, Cooper plays a middle-aged American playboy in Paris who is pursued by—and eventually falls in love with—a much younger woman. Despite receiving some positive reviews, including from Crowther, who praised the film's "charming performances", most reviewers concluded that Cooper was simply too old for the part. While audiences may not have welcomed seeing Cooper's heroic screen image tarnished by his playing an aging roué having an affair with a young girl, the film was still a box-office success. In 1957, Cooper appeared in Philip Dunne's romantic drama Ten North Frederick, based on the novel by John O'Hara. Cooper plays an attorney whose life is ruined by a double-crossing politician and his own secret affair with his daughter's roommate. While Cooper brought "conviction and controlled anguish" to his performance, according to biographer Jeffrey Meyers, it was not enough to save what Crowther called a "hapless film".

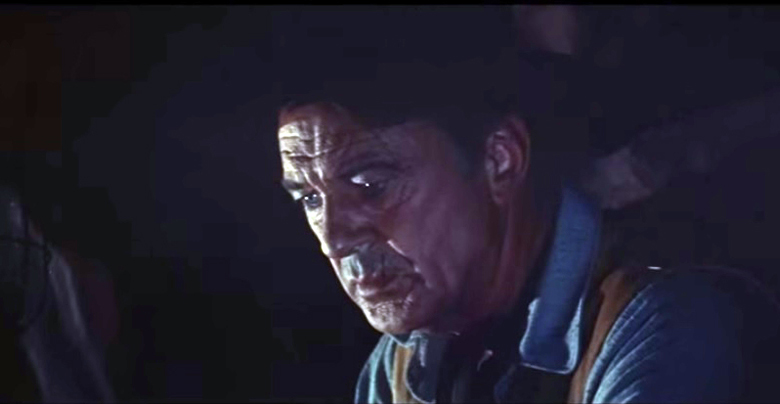
Cooper in Man of the West, 1958

Despite his ongoing health problems and several operations for ulcers and hernias, Cooper continued to work in action films. In 1958, he appeared in Anthony Mann's Western drama Man of the West (1958) with Julie London and Lee J. Cobb, about a reformed outlaw and killer who is forced to confront his violent past when the train in which he is riding is held up by his former gang members. The film has been called Cooper's "most pathological Western", with its themes of impotent rage, sexual humiliation, and sadism. According to Meyers, Cooper, who struggled with moral conflicts in his personal life, "understood the anguish of a character striving to retain his integrity ... [and] brought authentic feeling to the role of a tempted and tormented, yet essentially decent man". Mostly ignored by critics at the time, the film is now well-regarded by film scholars and is considered Cooper's last great film.

After his Warner Bros. contract ended, Cooper formed his own production company, Baroda Productions, and made three unusual films in 1959 about redemption. In Delmer Daves's Western drama The Hanging Tree, Cooper plays a frontier doctor who saves a criminal from a lynch mob, and later tries to exploit his sordid past. Cooper delivered a "powerful and persuasive" performance of an emotionally scarred man whose need to dominate others is transformed by the love and sacrifice of a woman. In Robert Rossen's historical adventure They Came to Cordura with Rita Hayworth, he plays an army officer who is found guilty of cowardice and assigned the degrading task of recommending soldiers for the Medal of Honor during the Pancho Villa Expedition of 1916. While Cooper received positive reviews, Variety and Films in Review felt he was too old for the part.

In Michael Anderson's action drama The Wreck of the Mary Deare with Charlton Heston, Cooper plays a disgraced merchant-marine officer who decides to stay aboard his sinking cargo ship to prove the vessel was deliberately scuttled and to redeem his good name. Like its two predecessors, the film was physically demanding. Cooper, who was a trained scuba diver, did most of his own underwater scenes. Biographer Jeffrey Meyers observed that in all three roles Cooper effectively conveyed the sense of lost honor and desire for redemption—what Joseph Conrad in Lord Jim called the "struggles of an individual trying to save from the fire his idea of what his moral identity should be".

== Personal life ==
=== Marriage and family ===
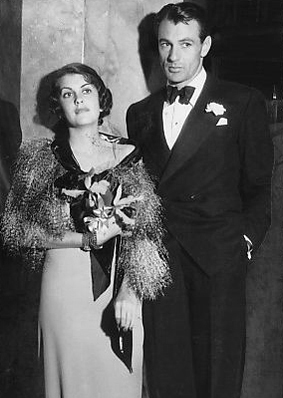
Veronica Balfe and Cooper, November 1933

Cooper was formally introduced to his future wife, 20-year-old New York debutante Veronica Balfe, (Note: Balfe worked briefly as an actress in 1933 using the professional name Sandra Shaw. She appeared in uncredited bit parts in No Other Woman, King Kong, and Blood Money.) on Easter Sunday 1933 at a party given by her uncle, art director Cedric Gibbons. Called "Rocky" by her family and friends, she grew up on Park Avenue and attended finishing schools. Her stepfather was Wall Street tycoon Paul Shields. Cooper and Rocky were quietly married at her parents' Park Avenue residence on December 15, 1933. According to his friends, the marriage had a positive impact on Cooper, who turned away from past indiscretions and took control of his life. Athletic and a lover of the outdoors, Rocky shared many of Cooper's interests, including riding, skiing, and skeet-shooting. While she organized their social life, her wealth and social connections provided Cooper access to New York high society. Cooper and his wife owned homes in the Los Angeles area in Encino (1933–36), Brentwood (1936–53), and Holmby Hills (1954–61), and owned a vacation home in Aspen, Colorado (1949–53). (Note: After their wedding, Cooper and his wife lived on a 10-acre (4.0 ha) ranch at 4723 White Oak Avenue in Encino, from 1933 to 1936. In 1936, they built a large white Bermuda-Georgian house at 11940 Chaparal in Brentwood, where they lived from 1936 to 1953. In 1948, they purchased 15 acres (6.1 ha) of land in Aspen, Colorado, and built a four-bedroom house, where they vacationed from 1949 to 1953. In July 1953, they began building a lavish, 6,000-square-foot (560 m^{2}) mansion on 1.5 acres (0.61 ha) of land at 200 North Baroda Drive in Holmby Hills, a modernistic four-bedroom house with an open floor plan, floor-to-ceiling windows, and a sculpted garden. They lived there from September 1954 until his death.)

Gary and Veronica Cooper's daughter, Maria Veronica Cooper, was born on September 15, 1937. By all accounts, he was a patient and affectionate father, teaching Maria to ride a bicycle, play tennis, ski, and ride horses. Sharing many of her parents' interests, she accompanied them on their travels and was often photographed with them. Like her father, she developed a love for art and drawing. (Note: Maria attended the Chouinard Art Institute in Los Angeles for four years and became an artist, with exhibitions in Los Angeles and New York.) As a family, they vacationed together in Sun Valley, Idaho, spent time at Rocky's parents' country house in Southampton, New York, and took frequent trips to Europe. Cooper and Rocky were legally separated on May 16, 1951, when Cooper moved out of their home. For over two years, they maintained a fragile and uneasy family life with their daughter. Cooper moved back into their home in November 1953, and their formal reconciliation occurred in February 1954.

=== Romantic relationships ===
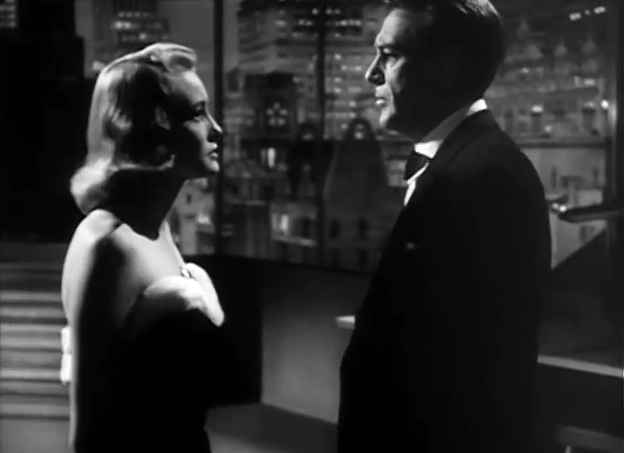
Patricia Neal and Cooper in The Fountainhead, 1949

Before his marriage, Cooper had a series of romantic relationships with leading actresses, beginning in 1927 with Clara Bow, who advanced his career by helping him get one of his first leading roles in Children of Divorce. (Note: Cooper and Bow began their affair during the production of one of her most popular films, It (1927), for which she had the studio film an extra scene that included Cooper. During the "It girl" publicity campaign, columnists started referring to Cooper as the "It boy".) Bow also got Cooper a role in Wings, which generated an enormous amount of fan mail for him. In 1928, he had a relationship with another experienced actress, Evelyn Brent, whom he met while filming Beau Sabreur. In 1929, while filming The Wolf Song, Cooper began an intense affair with Lupe Vélez, the most important romance of his early life. During their two years together, Cooper also had brief affairs with Marlene Dietrich while filming Morocco in 1930 and with Carole Lombard while making I Take This Woman in 1931. During his year abroad in 1931–32, Cooper had an affair with the married Countess Dorothy di Frasso, the former Dorothy Cadwell Taylor, while staying at her Villa Madama near Rome.

After he was married in December 1933, Cooper remained faithful to his wife until 1942, when he began an affair with Ingrid Bergman during the production of For Whom the Bell Tolls. Their relationship lasted through the completion of filming Saratoga Trunk in June 1943. In 1948, after finishing work on The Fountainhead, Cooper began an affair with Patricia Neal, his co-star. At first, they kept their affair discreet, but eventually it became an open secret in Hollywood, and Cooper's wife confronted him with the rumors, which he admitted were true. He also confessed that he was in love with Neal, and continued to see her. Cooper and his wife legally separated in May 1951, but he did not seek a divorce. Neal later said that Cooper hit her after she went on a date with Kirk Douglas, and that he arranged for her to have an abortion when she became pregnant with Cooper's child. Neal ended their relationship in December 1951. During his three-year separation from his wife, Cooper was rumored to have had affairs with Grace Kelly, Lorraine Chanel, and Gisèle Pascal.

In at least two unauthorized biographies of the industrialist and film producer Howard Hughes, writers Charles Higham and Darwin Porter have alleged that Hughes and Cooper engaged in a three-year sexual relationship during the mid 1920s while Cooper was first starting out in Hollywood and playing bit parts in silent films, claiming that Hughes lavished Cooper with expensive gifts such as automobiles, watches, and tailored clothing. However, mainstream biographers of Cooper, including Jeffrey Meyers and Larry Swindell, have not corroborated these accounts.

More mainstream Cooper biographers have explored his relationship in the late 1920s with the actor Anderson "Andy" Lawler, with whom Cooper shared a house on and off for a year, while at the same time seeing Clara Bow, Evelyn Brent, and Lupe Vélez. Cooper met Lawler, a fellow Paramount Pictures contract actor from Alabama, around 1929 while preparing for his starring role in The Virginian, with Lawler helping coach Cooper's accent and introducing him to a social circle that included George Cukor and William Haines. According to Cukor biographer Patrick McGilligan, Lawler had followed Cukor from New York to Hollywood and frequently brought Cooper to Cukor's private social gatherings. The two men shared a home in Los Angeles and frequently traveled together to Catalina Island, a close bond documented in Lawler's personal scrapbooks, correspondence with his mother, and a 1929 telegram requesting a shared guest room. During this period, Cooper was simultaneously involved in a tumultuous romance with actress Lupe Vélez, who grew intensely jealous of Cooper's closeness with Lawler and reportedly told columnist Hedda Hopper that she would sniff Cooper for Lawler's cologne when he returned home. Vélez's biographer Michelle Vogel noted that Vélez ultimately tolerated Cooper's intimate dynamic with Lawler on the condition that she could participate as well. According to film historian William J. Mann and recollections from Lawler's cousin William Kizer, Paramount executives eventually pressured Cooper to move out and distance himself from Lawler in order to protect Cooper's emerging screen image as a rugged leading man, a studio-engineered split that preceded Cooper's 1931 sabbatical in Europe—though the two men later remained lifelong friends.

In later life, Cooper became involved with costume designer Irene, and was, according to her, "the only man she ever loved". A year after his death in 1961, Irene committed suicide by jumping from the 11th floor of the Knickerbocker Hotel, after telling Doris Day of her grief over Cooper's death.

=== Friendships, interests, and character ===
According to Cooper

... the really satisfying things I do are offered me, free, for nothing. Ever go out in the fall and do a little hunting? See the frost on the grass and the leaves turning? Spend a day in the hills alone, or with good companions? Watch a sunset and a moonrise? Notice a bird in the wind? A stream in the woods, a storm at sea, cross the country by train, and catch a glimpse of something beautiful in the desert, or the farmlands? Free to everybody ...

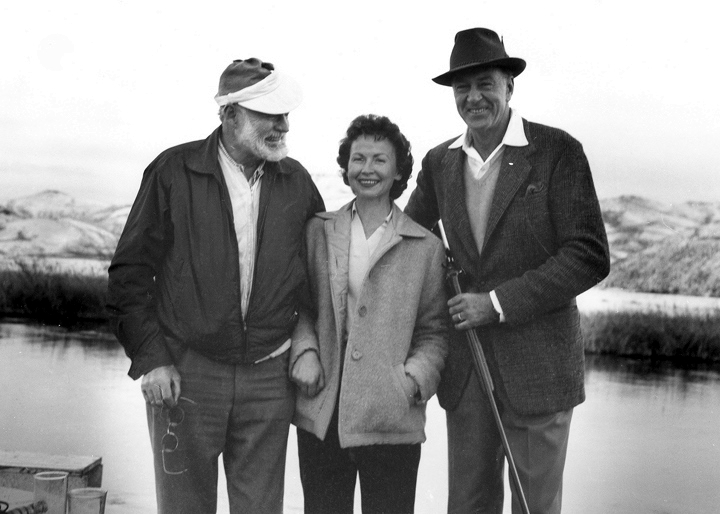
Ernest Hemingway, Bobbi Powell, and Cooper at Silver Creek, Idaho, 1959

Cooper's 20-year friendship with Ernest Hemingway began at Sun Valley in October 1940. In 1939, Hemingway had drawn upon Cooper's image in creating the character Robert Jordan in his novel For Whom the Bell Tolls. Hemingway and Cooper shared a passion for the outdoors, and for years they hunted duck and pheasant and skied together in Sun Valley. Both men admired the work of Rudyard Kipling—Cooper kept a copy of the poem "If—" in his dressing room—and had Kipling's sense of adventure.

As well as admiring Cooper's hunting skills and knowledge of the outdoors, Hemingway believed his character matched his screen persona, once telling a friend, "If you made up a character like Coop, nobody would believe it. He's just too good to be true." They saw each other often, and their friendship remained strong through the years. (Note: Cooper's friendship with Ernest Hemingway is explored in the documentary Cooper & Hemingway: The True Gen (2013).)

Cooper's social life generally centered on sports, outdoor activities, and dinner parties with his family and friends from the film industry, including directors Henry Hathaway, Howard Hawks, William Wellman, and Fred Zinnemann, and actors Joel McCrea, Barbara Stanwyck, James Stewart, and Robert Taylor. In addition to hunting, Cooper enjoyed riding, fishing, skiing, and, later in life, scuba diving. He never abandoned his early love for art and drawing, and he and his wife acquired a private collection of modern paintings, including works by Pierre-Auguste Renoir, Paul Gauguin, and Georgia O'Keeffe. Cooper owned several works by Pablo Picasso, whom he met in 1956. He also had a lifelong passion for automobiles, with a collection that included a 1930 Duesenberg.

Cooper was naturally reserved and introspective, and loved the solitude of outdoor activities. Not unlike his screen persona, his communication style frequently consisted of long silences with an occasional "yup" and "shucks". He once said, "If others have more interesting things to say than I have, I keep quiet." His friends said that Cooper was also an articulate, well-informed conversationalist on topics ranging from horses, guns, and Western history to film production, sports cars, and modern art. He was modest and unpretentious, frequently downplaying his acting abilities and career accomplishments. His friends and colleagues described him as charming, well-mannered, and thoughtful, with a lively, boyish sense of humor. He maintained a sense of propriety, never misused his movie-star status, and never sought special treatment or refused to work with a director or leading lady. Cooper's close friend Joel McCrea recalled, "Coop never fought, he never got mad, he never told anybody off that I know of; everybody [who] worked with him liked him."

=== Political views ===
Like his father, Cooper was a conservative Republican; he voted for Calvin Coolidge in 1924 and Herbert Hoover in 1928 and 1932, and campaigned for Wendell Willkie in 1940. When Franklin D. Roosevelt ran for an unprecedented fourth presidential term in 1944, Cooper campaigned for Thomas E. Dewey and criticized Roosevelt for being dishonest and adopting "foreign" ideas. In a radio address he had paid for himself just before the election, Cooper said, "I disagree with the New Deal belief that the America all of us love is old and worn-out and finished and has to borrow foreign notions that don't even seem to work any too well where they come from ... Our country is a young country that just has to make up its mind to be itself again." He also attended a Republican rally at the Los Angeles Memorial Coliseum that drew 93,000 Dewey supporters. In 1952, Cooper, Glenn Ford, Adolphe Menjou, and John Wayne supported Robert A. Taft over Dwight D. Eisenhower in the Republican primaries.

Cooper lent his name to, but was not active in, the Motion Picture Alliance for the Preservation of American Ideals, a conservative organization dedicated, according to its statement of principles, to preserving the "American way of life" and opposing communism and fascism. Members included Walter Brennan, Laraine Day, Walt Disney, Clark Gable, Hedda Hopper, Ronald Reagan, Barbara Stanwyck, and John Wayne. The organization advised the United States Congress to investigate communist influence in the motion-picture industry.

On October 23, 1947, Cooper was subpoenaed to appear before the House Un-American Activities Committee (HUAC) and asked whether he had observed any "communistic influence" in Hollywood. He recounted statements he had heard suggesting the Constitution was out of date and that Congress was an unnecessary institution, comments Cooper said he found "very un-American", and testified that he had rejected several scripts because he thought they were "tinged with communist ideas". Unlike some other witnesses, Cooper found ways to avoid naming any individuals or scripts.

In 1951, while making High Noon, Cooper befriended the film's screenwriter, Carl Foreman, who had been a member of the Communist Party. When Foreman was subpoenaed by the HUAC, Cooper put his career on the line to defend Foreman. When John Wayne and others threatened Cooper with blacklisting and the loss of his passport if he did not walk off the film, Cooper gave a statement to the press in support of Foreman, calling him "the finest kind of American". When producer Stanley Kramer removed Foreman's name as screenwriter, Cooper and director Fred Zinnemann threatened to walk off the film if Foreman's name were not restored. Foreman later said that of all his friends and allies and colleagues in Hollywood, "Cooper was the only big one who tried to help. The only one." Cooper offered to testify on Foreman's behalf before the committee, but character witnesses were not allowed. Foreman always sent future scripts to Cooper for first refusal, including The Bridge on the River Kwai, The Key, and The Guns of Navarone. Cooper had to turn them down because of his age.

=== Religion ===
Cooper was baptized in the Church of All Saints, Houghton Regis, in Bedfordshire, England, in December 1911, and was raised in the Episcopal Church in the United States. While he was not an observant Christian for most of his adult life, many of his friends believed he had a deeply spiritual side.

On June 26, 1953, Cooper accompanied his wife and daughter, who were devout Catholics, to Rome, where they had an audience with Pope Pius XII. Cooper and his wife were still separated at the time, but the papal visit marked the beginning of their reconciliation. In the following years, Cooper contemplated his mortality and his personal behavior, and started discussing Catholicism with his family. He began attending Mass with them regularly, and met with their parish priest, who offered Cooper spiritual guidance. After several months of study, Cooper was baptized as a Catholic on April 9, 1959, before a small group of family and friends at the Church of the Good Shepherd in Beverly Hills.

== Final years and death ==
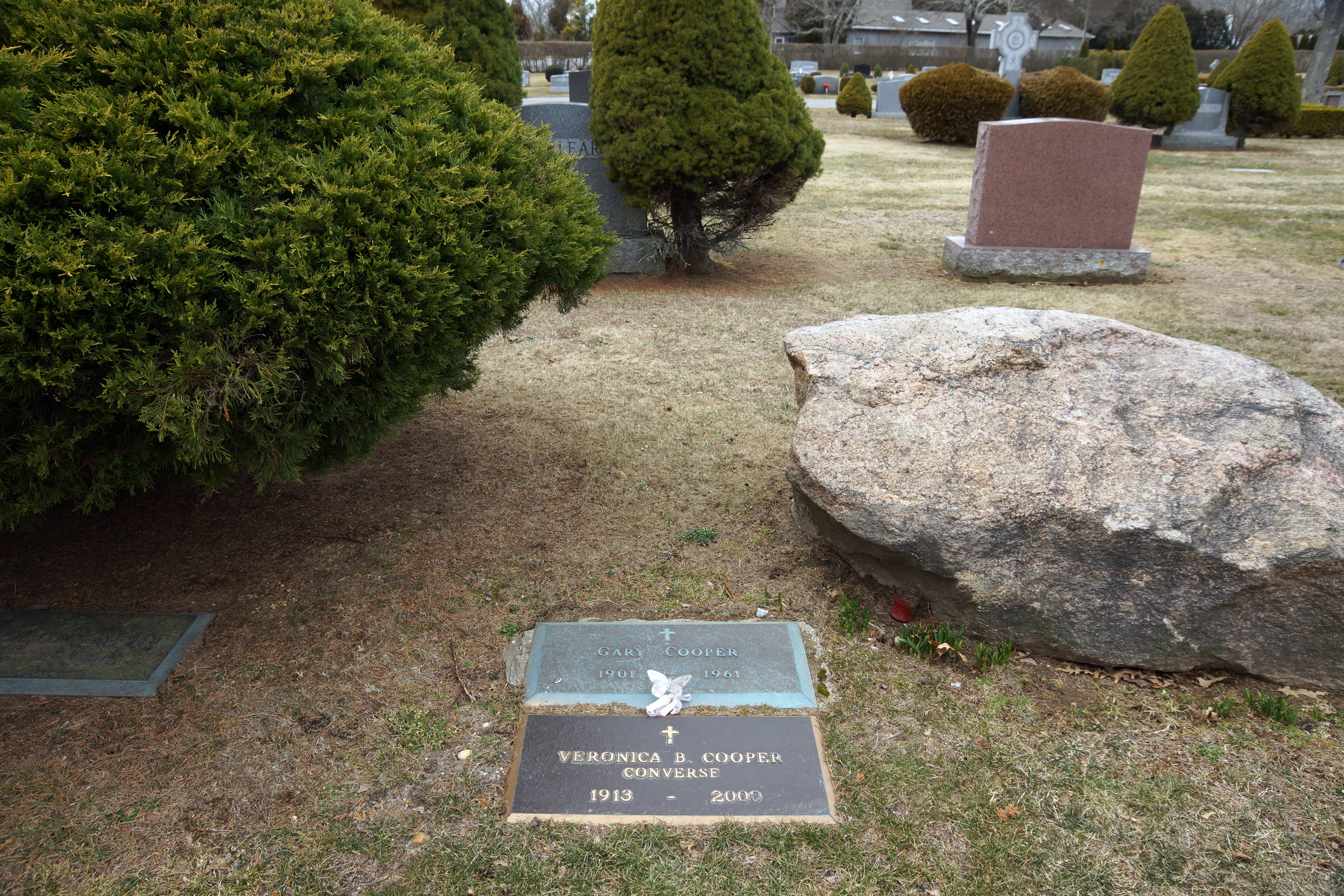
Cooper's grave in Sacred Hearts Cemetery in Southampton, New York

Cooper was diagnosed with prostate cancer in 1960. On April 14, 1960, he underwent surgery at Massachusetts General Hospital in Boston as the cancer metastasized to his colon. He fell ill again on May 13 and underwent further surgery at Cedars of Lebanon Hospital in Los Angeles in early June to remove a malignant tumor from his large intestine. After recuperating over the summer, Cooper took his family on vacation to the south of France before traveling to the UK in the fall to star in The Naked Edge. In December 1960, he worked on the NBC television documentary The Real West, which was part of the company's Project 20 series. (Note: In March 1961, Cooper traveled to New York to record the off-camera narration for the documentary – his last work as an actor.)

On December 27, his wife learned from their family doctor that Cooper's cancer had metastasized to his lungs and bones and was inoperable. His family decided not to tell him immediately.

On January 9, 1961, Cooper attended a dinner given in his honor and hosted by Frank Sinatra and Dean Martin at the Friars Club. The dinner was attended by many of his industry friends and concluded with a brief speech by Cooper, who said, "The only achievement I'm proud of is the friends I've made in this community."

In mid-January, Cooper took his family to Sun Valley for their last vacation together. Cooper and Ernest Hemingway hiked through the snow together for the last time. On February 27, after returning to Los Angeles, Cooper learned that he was dying. He later told his family, "We'll pray for a miracle; but if not, and that's God's will, that's all right, too." On April 17, Cooper watched the Academy Awards ceremony on television and saw his good friend James Stewart, who had presented Cooper with his first Oscar 19 years earlier, accept on Cooper's behalf an honorary award for lifetime achievement—his third Oscar. Holding back tears, Stewart said, "Coop, I'll get this to you right away. And Coop, I want you to know this: that with this goes all the warm friendship and the affection and the admiration and the deep, the deep respect of all of us. We're very, very proud of you, Coop. All of us are tremendously proud." (Note: The award dedication read, "To Gary Cooper for his many memorable screen performances and the international recognition he, as an individual, has gained for the motion picture industry.") The next day, newspapers around the world announced that Cooper was dying. He received numerous messages of appreciation and encouragement, including telegrams from Pope John XXIII and Queen Elizabeth II and a telephone call from President John F. Kennedy.

In his last public statement on May 4, 1961, Cooper said, "I know that what is happening is God's will. I am not afraid of the future." He received the last rites on May 12 and died quietly the next day.

A requiem was held on May 18 at the Church of the Good Shepherd, attended by many of Cooper's friends, including Fred Astaire, Jack Benny, Marlene Dietrich, John Ford, Henry Hathaway, Audrey Hepburn, Bob Hope, Peter Lawford, William Demarest, Dean Martin, Joel McCrea, Walter Pidgeon, Edward G. Robinson, Randolph Scott, Frank Sinatra, James Stewart, Jack L. Warner, and John Wayne. (Note: Hemingway was too ill to attend the funeral. He took his own life on July 2, 1961, less than two months after Cooper died.) Cooper was buried in the Grotto of Our Lady of Lourdes in Holy Cross Cemetery in Culver City, California. In May 1974, after his family relocated to New York, Cooper's remains were exhumed and reburied in Sacred Hearts Cemetery in Southampton. His grave is marked next to a three-ton boulder from a Montauk quarry.

== Acting style and reputation ==
Naturalness is hard [for me] to talk about, but I guess it boils down to this: you find out what people expect of your type of character and then you give them what they want. That way, an actor never seems unnatural or affected, no matter what role he plays.

Cooper's acting style consisted of three essential characteristics—his ability to project elements of his own personality onto the characters he portrayed, to appear natural and authentic in his roles, and to underplay and deliver restrained performances calibrated for the camera and the screen. Acting teacher Lee Strasberg once observed: "The simplest examples of Stanislavsky's ideas are actors such as Gary Cooper, John Wayne, and Spencer Tracy. They try not to act, but to be themselves, to respond or react. They refuse to say or do anything they feel not to be consonant with their own characters." Film director François Truffaut ranked Cooper among "the greatest actors" because of his ability to deliver great performances "without direction". This ability to project elements of his own personality onto his characters produced a continuity across his performances to the extent that critics and audiences were convinced he was simply "playing himself".

Cooper's ability to project his personality onto his characters played an important part in his appearing natural and authentic on screen. Actor John Barrymore said of Cooper, "This fellow is the world's greatest actor. He does without effort what the rest of us spend our lives trying to learn—namely, to be natural." Charles Laughton, who played opposite Cooper in Devil and the Deep agreed, "In truth, that boy hasn't the least idea how well he acts ... He gets at it from the inside, from his own clear way of looking at life." William Wyler, who directed Cooper in two films, called him a "superb actor, a master of movie acting".

In his review of Cooper's performance in The Real Glory, Graham Greene wrote, "Sometimes his lean photogenic face seems to leave everything to the lens, but there is no question here of his not acting. Watch him inoculate the girl against cholera—the casual jab of the needle, and the dressing slapped on while he talks, as though a thousand arms had taught him where to stab and he doesn't have to think anymore."

Cooper's style of underplaying before the camera surprised many of his directors and fellow actors. Even in his earliest feature films, he recognized the camera's ability to pick up slight gestures and facial movements. Of Cooper's performance in Sergeant York, director Howard Hawks said, "He worked very hard and yet he didn't seem to be working. He was a strange actor because you'd look at him during a scene and you'd think ... this isn't going to be any good. But when you saw the rushes in the projection room the next day you could read in his face all the things he'd been thinking." Sam Wood, who directed Cooper in four films, said of Cooper's performance in Pride of the Yankees, "What I thought was underplaying turned out to be just the right approach. On the screen he's perfect, yet on the set you'd swear it's the worst job of acting in the history of motion pictures."

Cooper's fellow actors admired his abilities. Having made two films with Cooper, Ingrid Bergman said, "The personality of this man was so enormous, so overpowering—and that expression in his eyes and his face, it was so delicate and so underplayed. You just didn't notice it until you saw it on the screen. I thought he was marvelous; the most underplaying and the most natural actor I ever worked with."

Tom Hanks said, "In only one scene in the first film to win the Academy Award for Best Picture, we see the future of screen acting in the form of Gary Cooper. He is quiet and natural, somehow different from the other cast members. He does something mysterious with his eyes and shoulders that is much more like 'being' than 'acting'."

Daniel Day-Lewis said, "I don't particularly like westerns as a genre, but I do love certain westerns. High Noon means a lot to me—I love the purity and the honesty, I love Gary Cooper in that film, the idea of the last man standing."

Chris Pratt said, "I started watching Westerns when I was shooting in London about four or five years ago. I really fell in love with Gary Cooper, and his stuff. That sucked me into the Westerns. Before, I never got engrossed in the story. I'd just dip in, and there were guys on horses in black and white. High Noon's later Gary Cooper, I liked that. But I liked The Westerner. That's my favorite one. I have that poster hung up in my house because I really like that one."

Al Pacino said, "Gary Cooper was a phenomenon—his ability to take some thing and elevate it, give it such dignity. One of the great presences."

Mylène Demongeot first met Gary Cooper at the opening of the first escalator to be installed in a cinema, at the Rex Theatre in Paris, on June 7, 1957. She said in a 2015 interview: "Gary Cooper ... il est sublime! Là je dois dire que ça fait partie des stars, y'a Gary Cooper, Cary Grant, John Wayne, ces grands Américains que j'ai rencontrés comme ça, c'est vraiment des mecs incroyables. Y'en a plus des comme ça! Euh non" (Gary Cooper was sublime, there I have to say, now he was part of the stars, Gary Cooper, Cary Grant, John Wayne, those great Americans who I've met really were unbelievable guys, there aren't any like them anymore)."

== Career assessment and legacy ==
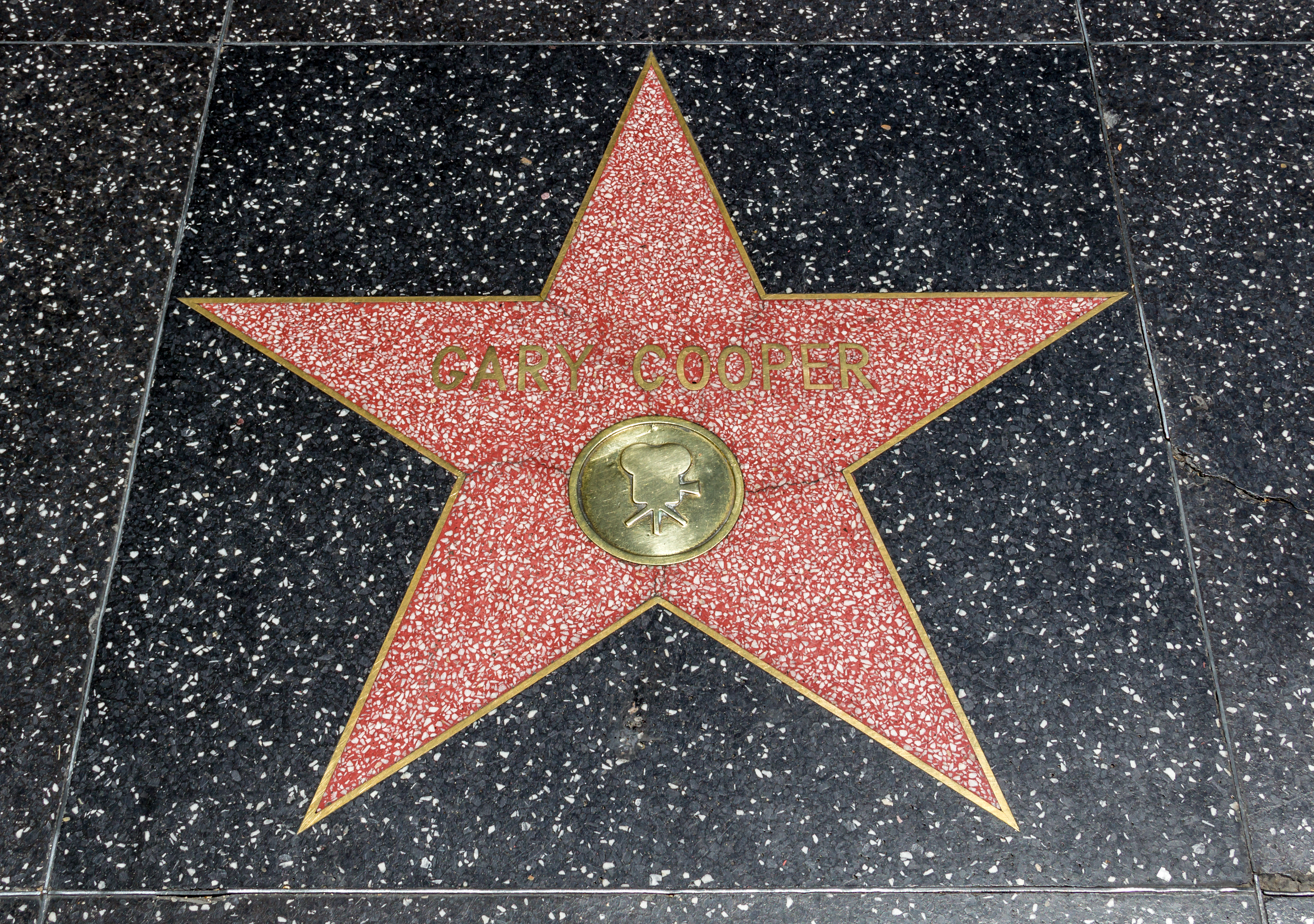
Cooper's star on the Hollywood Walk of Fame

Cooper's career spanned 36 years, from 1925 to 1961. During that time he appeared in 84 feature films in a leading role. He was a major movie star from the end of the silent film era to the end of the golden age of Classical Hollywood. His natural and authentic acting style appealed powerfully to both men and women, and his range of performances included roles in most major movie genres, including Westerns, war films, adventure films, dramas, crime films, romances, comedies, and romantic comedies. He appeared on the Motion Picture Herald exhibitor's poll of top ten film personalities for 23 consecutive years, from 1936 to 1958. According to Quigley's annual poll, Cooper was one of the top money-making stars for 18 years, appearing in the top ten in 1936–37, 1941–49, and 1951–57. He topped the list in 1953. In Quigley's list of all-time money-making stars, Cooper is listed fourth, after John Wayne, Clint Eastwood, and Tom Cruise. At the time of his death, it was estimated that his films had grossed well over $200 million (equivalent to $2.15 billion in 2025).

In more than half his feature films, Cooper portrayed Westerners, soldiers, pilots, sailors, and explorers, all men of action. In the rest, he played a wide range of characters, included doctors, professors, artists, architects, clerks, and baseball players. Cooper's heroic screen image changed with each period of his career. In his early films, he played the young naive hero sure of his moral position and trusting in the triumph of simple virtues (The Virginian). After becoming a major star, his Western screen persona was replaced by a more cautious hero in adventure films and dramas (A Farewell to Arms). During the height of his career, from 1936 to 1943, he played a new type of hero: a champion of the common man willing to sacrifice himself for others (Mr. Deeds, Meet John Doe, and For Whom the Bell Tolls).

In the postwar years, Cooper attempted broader variations on his screen image, which now reflected a hero increasingly at odds with the world, who must face adversity alone (The Fountainhead and High Noon). In his final films, Cooper's hero rejects the violence of the past, and seeks to reclaim lost honor and find redemption (Friendly Persuasion and Man of the West). The screen persona he developed and sustained throughout his career represented the ideal American hero—a tall, handsome, sincere man of steadfast integrity who emphasized action over intellect, and combined the heroic qualities of the romantic lover, the adventurer, and the common man.

On February 6, 1960, Cooper was awarded a star on the Hollywood Walk of Fame at 6243 Hollywood Boulevard for his contribution to the film industry. He was also awarded a star on the sidewalk outside the Ellen Theater in Bozeman, Montana.

On May 6, 1961, Cooper was awarded the French Order of Arts and Letters in recognition of his significant contribution to the arts. On July 30, 1961, he posthumously received the David di Donatello Special Award in Italy for his career achievements.

In 1966, Cooper was inducted into the Hall of Great Western Performers at the National Cowboy & Western Heritage Museum in Oklahoma City. In 2015, he was inducted into the Utah Cowboy and Western Heritage Hall of Fame. The American Film Institute (AFI) ranked Cooper 11th on its list of the 25 male stars of classic Hollywood. Three of his characters—Will Kane, Lou Gehrig, and Sergeant York—made AFI's list of the 100 greatest heroes and villains, all of them as heroes. His Lou Gehrig line, "Today, I consider myself the luckiest man on the face of the earth", is ranked by AFI as the 38th greatest movie quote of all time.

More than half a century after his death, Cooper's enduring legacy, according to biographer Jeffrey Meyers, is his image of the ideal American hero preserved in his film performances. Charlton Heston once said, "He projected the kind of man Americans would like to be, probably more than any actor that's ever lived."

== In popular culture ==
In the 1930s hit song "Puttin' On the Ritz", Cooper is referred to in the line "dress up like a million-dollar trooper/Tryin' hard to look like Gary Cooper, Super duper!" More than two decades after Cooper's death, a new version of the song was released in 1983 by Taco; the original lyrics were kept, including the references to Cooper.

Gary Cooper is referenced several times in the critically acclaimed television series The Sopranos, with protagonist Tony Soprano asking, "Whatever happened to Gary Cooper? The strong, silent type..." whilst complaining about his problems to his therapist Dr. Melfi.

Patricia Neal named the Abbey of Regina Laudis' outdoor theater building The Gary-The Olivia in honor of Cooper and her daughter Olivia Dahl.

A San Antonio, Texas, subdivision has several streets named after Hollywood stars, including a Gary Cooper Drive.

== Awards and nominations ==
| Year | Award | Category | Film | Result | Ref |
|---|---|---|---|---|---|
| 1937 | Academy Award | Best Actor | Mr. Deeds Goes to Town | Nominated | |
| 1937 | New York Film Critics Circle Award | Best Actor | Mr. Deeds Goes to Town | Nominated | |
| 1941 | New York Film Critics Circle Award | Best Actor | Sergeant York | Won | |
| 1942 | Academy Award | Best Actor | Sergeant York | Won | |
| 1943 | Academy Award | Best Actor | The Pride of the Yankees | Nominated | |
| 1944 | Academy Award | Best Actor | For Whom the Bell Tolls | Nominated | |
| 1945 | New York Film Critics Circle Award | Best Actor | Along Came Jones | Nominated | |
| 1952 | Photoplay Award | Most Popular Male Star | High Noon | Won | |
| 1953 | Academy Award | Best Actor | High Noon | Won | |
| 1953 | Golden Globe Award | Best Actor | High Noon | Won | |
| 1953 | New York Film Critics Circle Award | Best Actor | High Noon | Nominated | |
| 1957 | Golden Globe Award | Best Actor | Friendly Persuasion | Nominated | |
| 1957 | New York Film Critics Circle Award | Best Actor | Friendly Persuasion | Nominated | |
| 1959 | Laurel Award | Top Action Performance | The Hanging Tree | Won | |
| 1960 | Laurel Award | Top Action Performance | They Came to Cordura | Won | |
| 1961 | Academy Award | Academy Honorary Award | | Won | |

== Filmography ==
The following is a list of feature films in which Cooper appeared in a leading role.

- The Winning of Barbara Worth (1926)
- Children of Divorce (1927)
- Arizona Bound (1927)
- Wings (1927)
- Nevada (1927)
- It (1927)
- The Last Outlaw (1927)
- Beau Sabreur (1928)
- The Legion of the Condemned (1928)
- Doomsday (1928)
- Half a Bride (1928)
- Lilac Time (1928)
- The First Kiss (1928)
- The Shopworn Angel (1928)
- Wolf Song (1929)
- Betrayal (1929)
- The Virginian (1929)
- Only the Brave (1930)
- The Texan (1930)
- Seven Days' Leave (1930)
- A Man from Wyoming (1930)
- The Spoilers (1930)
- Morocco (1930)
- Fighting Caravans (1931)
- City Streets (1931)
- I Take This Woman (1931)
- His Woman (1931)
- Devil and the Deep (1932)
- If I Had a Million (1932)
- A Farewell to Arms (1932)
- Today We Live (1933)
- One Sunday Afternoon (1933)
- Design for Living (1933)
- Alice in Wonderland (1933)
- Operator 13 (1934)
- Now and Forever (1934)
- The Lives of a Bengal Lancer (1935)
- The Wedding Night (1935)
- Peter Ibbetson (1935)
- Desire (1936)
- Mr. Deeds Goes to Town (1936)
- The General Died at Dawn (1936)
- The Plainsman (1936)
- Souls at Sea (1937)
- The Adventures of Marco Polo (1938)
- Bluebeard's Eighth Wife (1938)
- The Cowboy and the Lady (1938)
- Beau Geste (1939)
- The Real Glory (1939)
- The Westerner (1940)
- North West Mounted Police (1940)
- Meet John Doe (1941)
- Sergeant York (1941)
- Ball of Fire (1941)
- The Pride of the Yankees (1942)
- For Whom the Bell Tolls (1943)
- The Story of Dr. Wassell (1944)
- Casanova Brown (1944)
- Along Came Jones (1945)
- Saratoga Trunk (1945)
- Cloak and Dagger (1946)
- Unconquered (1947)
- Good Sam (1948)
- The Fountainhead (1949)
- Task Force (1949)
- Bright Leaf (1950)
- Dallas (1950)
- You're in the Navy Now (1951)
- It's a Big Country (1951)
- Distant Drums (1951)
- High Noon (1952)
- Springfield Rifle (1952)
- Return to Paradise (1953)
- Blowing Wild (1953)
- Garden of Evil (1954)
- Vera Cruz (1954)
- The Court-Martial of Billy Mitchell (1955)
- Friendly Persuasion (1956)
- Love in the Afternoon (1957)
- Ten North Frederick (1958)
- Man of the West (1958)
- The Hanging Tree (1959)
- They Came to Cordura (1959)
- The Wreck of the Mary Deare (1959)
- The Naked Edge (1961)

== Radio appearances ==
| Date | Program | Episode/source |
|---|---|---|
| April 7, 1935 | Lux Radio Theatre | The Prince Chap |
| February 1, 1937 | Lux Radio Theatre | Mr. Deeds Goes To Town |
| May 2, 1938 | Lux Radio Theatre | The Prisoner Of Shark Island |
| September 23, 1940 | Lux Radio Theatre | The Westerner |
| September 28, 1941 | Screen Guild Theater | Meet John Doe |
| April 20, 1942 | Lux Radio Theatre | North West Mounted Police |
| October 4, 1943 | Lux Radio Theatre | The Pride Of The Yankees |
| October 23, 1944 | Lux Radio Theatre | The Story Of Dr. Wassell |
| December 11, 1944 | Lux Radio Theatre | Casanova Brown |
| February 12, 1945 | Lux Radio Theatre | For Whom The Bell Tolls |
