= Basilica of the Sacred Hearts of Jesus and Mary (Southampton, New York) =

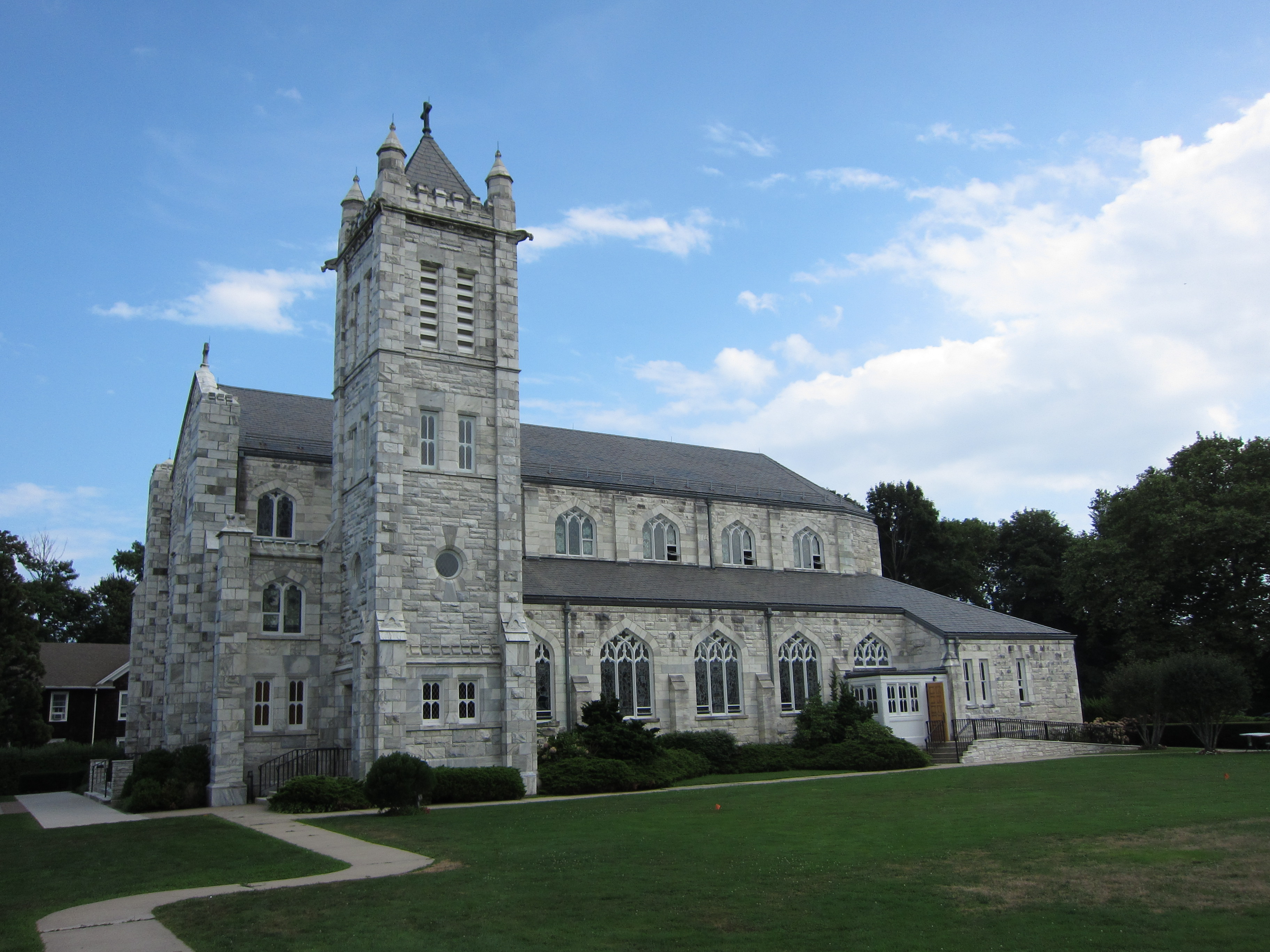

- Location in New York
- 40°53′02″N 72°23′54″W
- Location: 168 Hill St. Southampton, New York
- Country: United States
- Denomination: Roman Catholic Church
- Website: shjmbasilica.org

Architecture
- Style: Gothic Revival
- Completed: 1908
- Construction cost: $100,000

Specifications
- Materials: Granite

Administration
- Diocese: Rockville Centre

Clergy
- Bishop: Most Rev. William Murphy
- Rector: Rev. Michael Vetrano

The Basilica of the Sacred Hearts of Jesus and Mary is a minor basilica of the Catholic Church located in the village of Southampton, New York, United States. It is also a parish church of the Diocese of Rockville Centre. The Gothic Revival-style edifice was completed in 1908 for $100,000. The exterior is covered in white marble. Pope Benedict XVI elevated the church to the status of minor basilica on November 11, 2011.

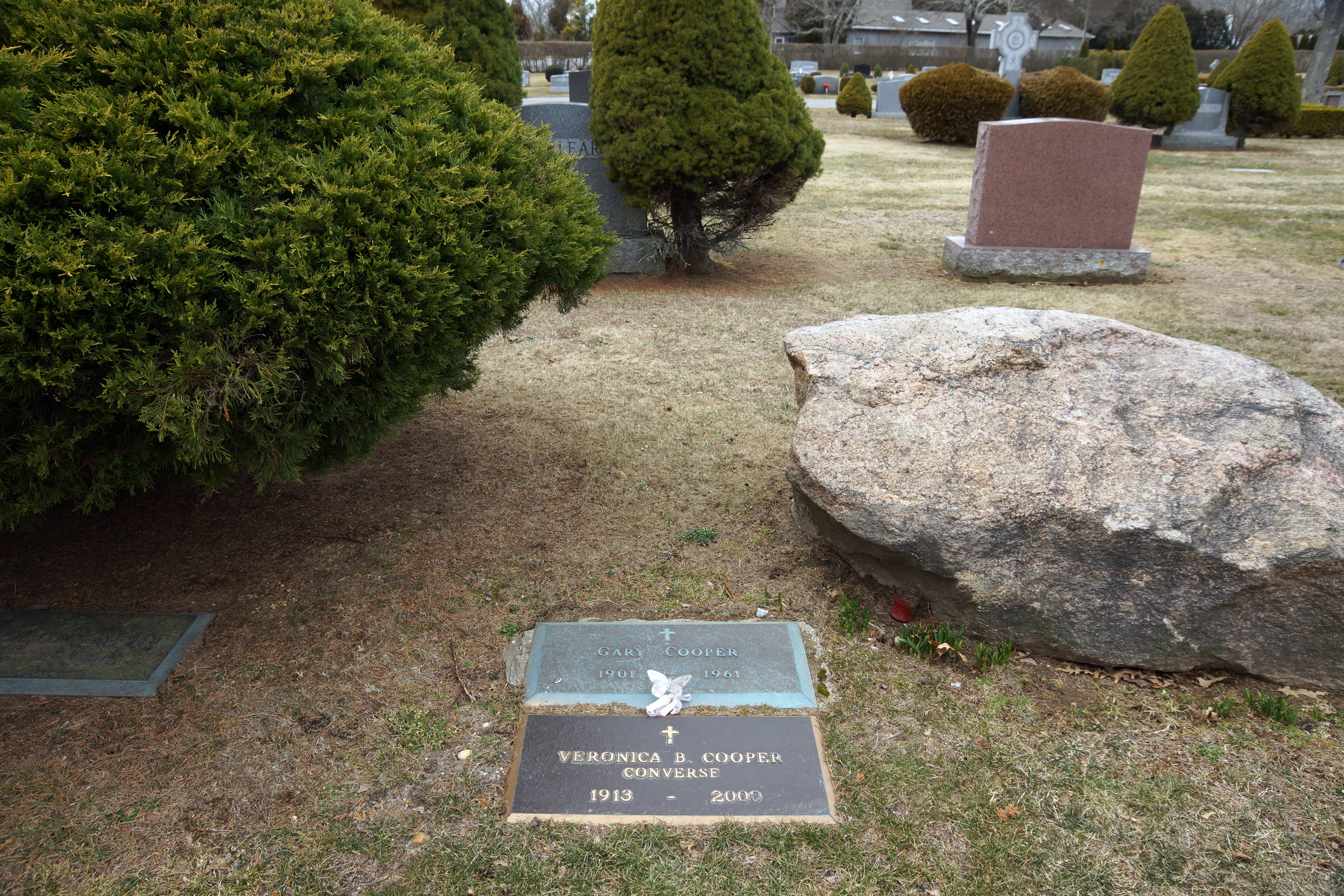
Gary Cooper's grave
