= The Story of Dr. Wassell =

1944 film by Cecil B. DeMille

- Theatrical release poster
- Directed by: Cecil B. DeMille
- Screenplay by: Alan Le May; Charles Bennett
- Story by: Corydon M. Wassell; James Hilton
- Produced by: Cecil B. DeMille
- Starring: Gary Cooper; Laraine Day; Signe Hasso; Dennis O'Keefe; Carol Thurston
- Cinematography: Victor Milner; William E. Snyder
- Edited by: Anne Bauchens
- Music by: Victor Young
- Color process: Technicolor
- Production company: Paramount Pictures
- Distributed by: Paramount Pictures
- Release dates: April 26, 1944 (Little Rock, Arkansas, premiere)
- Running time: 140 minutes
- Country: United States
- Language: English
- Budget: $2,744,991
- Box office: $6,222,192

The Story of Dr. Wassell is a 1944 American World War II film set in the Dutch East Indies, directed by Cecil B. DeMille, and starring Gary Cooper, Laraine Day, Signe Hasso and Dennis O'Keefe. The film was based on a book of the same name by novelist and screenwriter James Hilton.

The book and film were inspired by the wartime activities of U.S. Navy Doctor Corydon M. Wassell which were referred to by President Roosevelt in a radio broadcast made in April 1942. The appropriate section of this broadcast appears toward the end of the film.

For their work on this film, Farciot Edouart, Gordon Jennings and George Dutton received a nomination for the Oscar for Best Effects.

== Plot ==
Dr. Wassell is a missionary doctor from Arkansas, who had in the past worked in China (which is shown in the first half of the film as a series of flashback (narrative)s) and after the Japanese invasion of Batavia (Dutch East Indies) finds himself (now as a doctor in the US Navy) caring for twelve American soldiers badly wounded during Japanese strafing of some cruisers. Ignoring advice to abandon his patients, Wassell manages to care for them while leading them through the jungle until they can be evacuated by boat to Australia.

== Cast ==
- Gary Cooper as Dr. Corydon M. Wassell
- Laraine Day as Madeleine
- Signe Hasso as Bettina
- Dennis O'Keefe as Benjamin 'Hoppy' Hopkins
- Carol Thurston as Tremartini
- Carl Esmond as Lt. Dirk Van Daal
- Paul Kelly as Murdock
- Elliott Reid as William 'Andy' Anderson
- Stanley Ridges as Cmdr. William B. 'Bill' Goggins
- Renny McEvoy as Johnny Leeweather
- Oliver Thorndike as Alabam
- Philip Ahn as Ping
- Barbara Britton as Ruth
- Cecil B. DeMille as Narrator (uncredited)
- unbilled players include Richard Aherne, Irving Bacon, Sven Hugo Borg, Victor Borge, Gloria Dea, Yvonne De Carlo, Mildred Harris, Ann Doran, Milton Kibbee, Elmo Lincoln, Richard Loo, Gavin Muir, Jack Norton, Philip Van Zandt, and Dimples Cooper (Elizabeth Cooper)

== Production ==
It was originally announced that Yvonne De Carlo would play the role of the Javanese nurse.

DeMille wanted Alan Ladd to play the role of Hoppy, but he had to go into military service.

== Reception ==
A contemporary review by Bosley Crowther in The New York Times described the film as "blood, sweat and tears built up to spectacle in the familiar De Mille "epic" style," and "a fiction which is as garish as the spires of Hollywood. [De Mille] has telescoped fact with wildest fancy in the most flamboyantly melodramatic way. And he has messed up a simple human story with the cheapest kind of comedy and romance," adding that De Mille "has worked in enough pyrotechnics to leave the audience suffering from shell shock." Film critic and author James Agee reviewed it in 1944: "I like Gary Cooper; but God himself, assisted by all nine Muses, could not have made an appropriate film of Dr. Wassell once that piece of casting was settled on." A review of the film in Variety reported that "The exploits of the by-now famed naval commander are brought to the screen on a lavish scale by Cecil B. DeMille, with an exceptionally fine cast and good comedy relief," further noting that the film features "one of Cooper’s best performances." Writing in AllMovie, critic Craig Butler notes in his review that although "Cecil B. DeMille and his writers have tricked out [the plot] with cliché after cliché, including an entirely extraneous volcano explosion," the film "ends up being a good enough movie, thanks to the underlying idea, DeMille's adept way of handling over-the-top action plots and Gary Cooper's contrasting customary underplaying."

=== Box office ===
The Story of Dr. Wassell earned over $4.2 million in domestic box office receipts, making it one of the highest-grossing films of 1944, but due to its high production cost, the film only earned a profit of $205,639.

The film was the seventh most popular film of the year released in Australia in 1945, and the fifth most popular movie of 1946 in France with admissions of 5,866,693.

== In popular culture ==
In the Truman Capote novella Breakfast at Tiffany's, Holly Golightly was to have auditioned for the role of Dr. Wassel's nurse, but impulsively left for New York City.
