= Church of All Saints, Houghton Regis =

Anglican church in Bedfordshire, England

Coordinates: 51.9049°N 0.5211°W

The Parish Church of All Saints, Houghton Regis
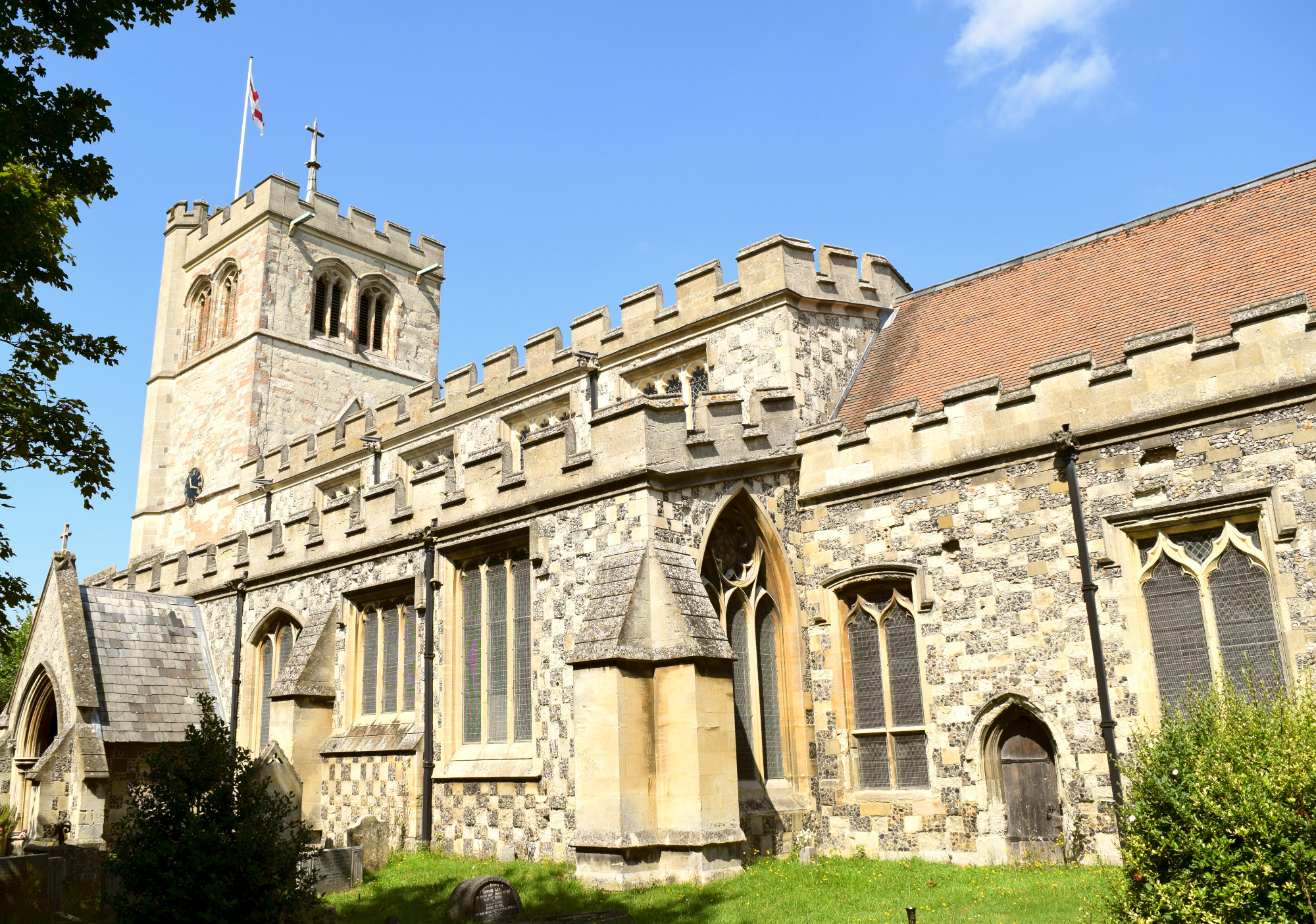
- Houghton Regis – Church of All Saints

- Location in Bedfordshire
- OS grid reference: TL 01836 23958
- Location: Houghton Regis, Bedfordshire
- Country: England
- Denomination: Church of England
- Churchmanship: Anglo-Catholic
- Website: AllSaintsHR.co.uk Saint Anselm of Canterbury, Saint Pope Gregory I, Saint James the Great Saint James the Less, Saint Henry II, Holy Roman Emperor, Saint Scholastica, Saint Stephen, Saint Aloysius Gonzaga, Saint Dominic,

History
- Status: Parish church

Architecture
- Style: Perpendicular Gothic

Administration
- Province: Canterbury
- Diocese: Diocese of St Albans
- Archdeaconry: Bedford
- Deanery: Dunstable
- Benefice: Houghton Regis
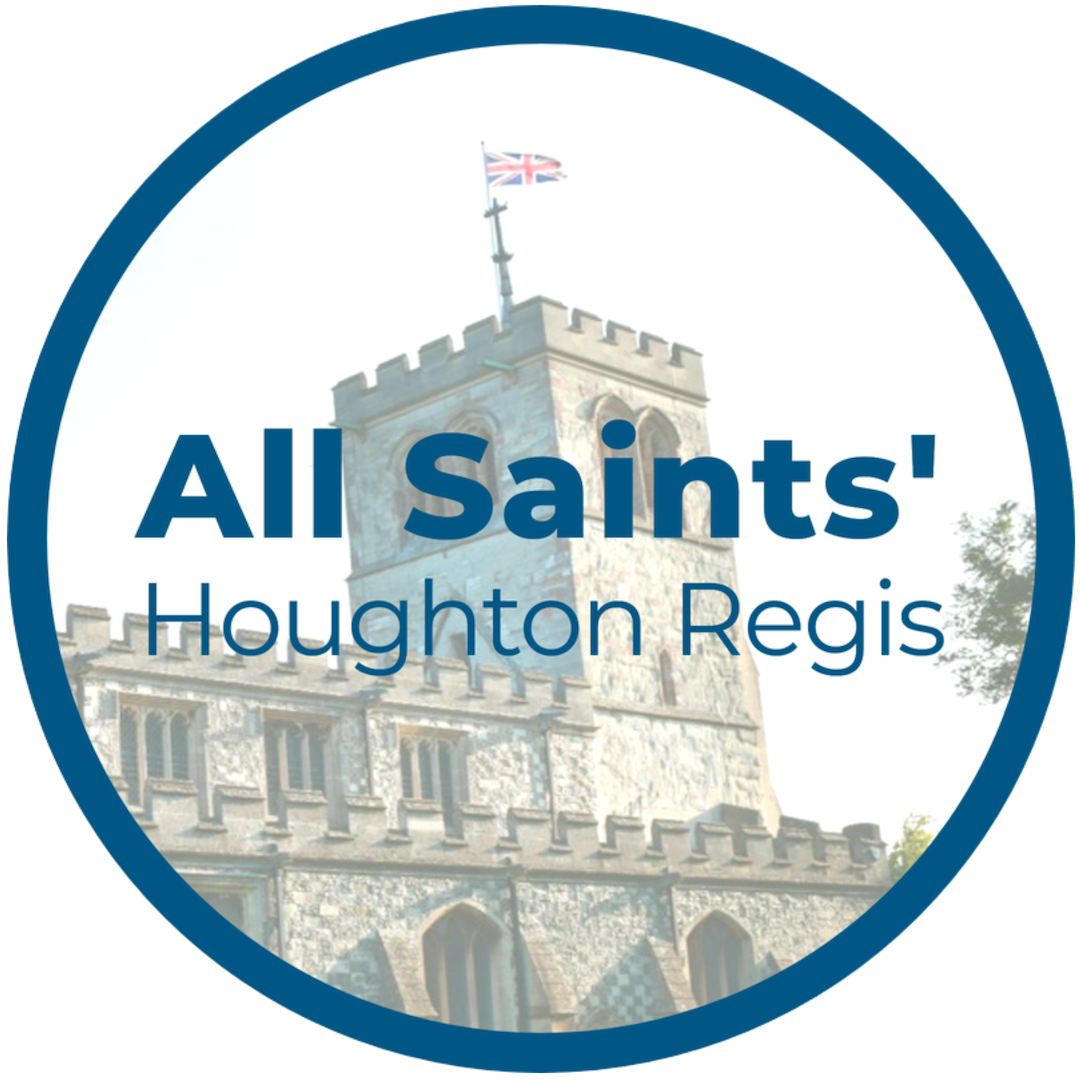

The Church of All Saints, Houghton Regis, Bedfordshire, is a medieval Grade I listed building. Characterised by flint and clunch checker work on the exterior, the church dates predominantly from the 13th and 14th centuries, with 15th century additions. All Saints' serves as the Parish Church for Houghton Regis, the parish including the town, parts of North Dunstable, Bidwell West, Thorn, and Linmere, as well as the hamlet of Sewell.

== Brief history ==
The religious use of the site predates the present building and is claimed to go back one thousand years to Saxon times. During the reign of Edward the Confessor (1042 -1066) Houghton Regis was a royal manor. A pre-Conquest church located on the site of the current Parish Church was one of very few in Bedfordshire to be mentioned in Domesday Book (AD 1086), which records that it was held by William the Chamberlain, who also held St Mary's Church, Luton. Domesday also recorded the church's finances. Its financial endowment, half a hide, was valued at 12s. In 1291 the church's value (mostly from its glebe land) was recorded at £16 13s. 4d.

King Henry I gave Houghton Regis to Earl Robert of Gloucester, and subsequently his son William granted it to the monks of St Albans Abbey in 1153. However, only the font remains today from that church. All Saints’ was reconstructed in later centuries, probably before the leadership of Abbot John Moore of St Albans, who ordered the Tithe Barn adjacent to the churchyard to be constructed between 1396 and 1401.

Upon the Dissolution of the monasteries the vicarage was listed as worth £11 13s. 4d. and the rectory (including parish land) at £41.

The church held six registers antedating 1813: "(1) all entries 1538 to 1678; (2) the same 1704 to 1767, marriages to 1754; (3) marriages 1754 to 1795; (4) baptisms and burials 1768 to 1807; (5) marriages 1795 to 1807; (6) marriages 1807 to 1812." The actor Gary Cooper and his brother Arthur were baptised and confirmed at All Saints' on 3 December 1911. These records are now in the care of Bedfordshire Archives.

The churchyard was closed to new burials in the 1980s.

In 2011, the Mayor, Cllr Robin Hines, unveiled a new Town Sign for Houghton Regis. It was financed by specific grant funding and was intended to “add a sense of place and community to the town.” The sign and crest feature historic and more modern elements including All Saints Church.

In 2019 a major restoration of the outer fabric ensures that All Saints' is taken out of the Heritage At Risk Register.

The church tradition of All Saints’ is rooted in the catholic heritage of the Church of England (sometimes called Anglo-Catholic). The Parish Mass, every Sunday at 10:30am, is the main weekly act of worship.

== Architecture and notable features ==
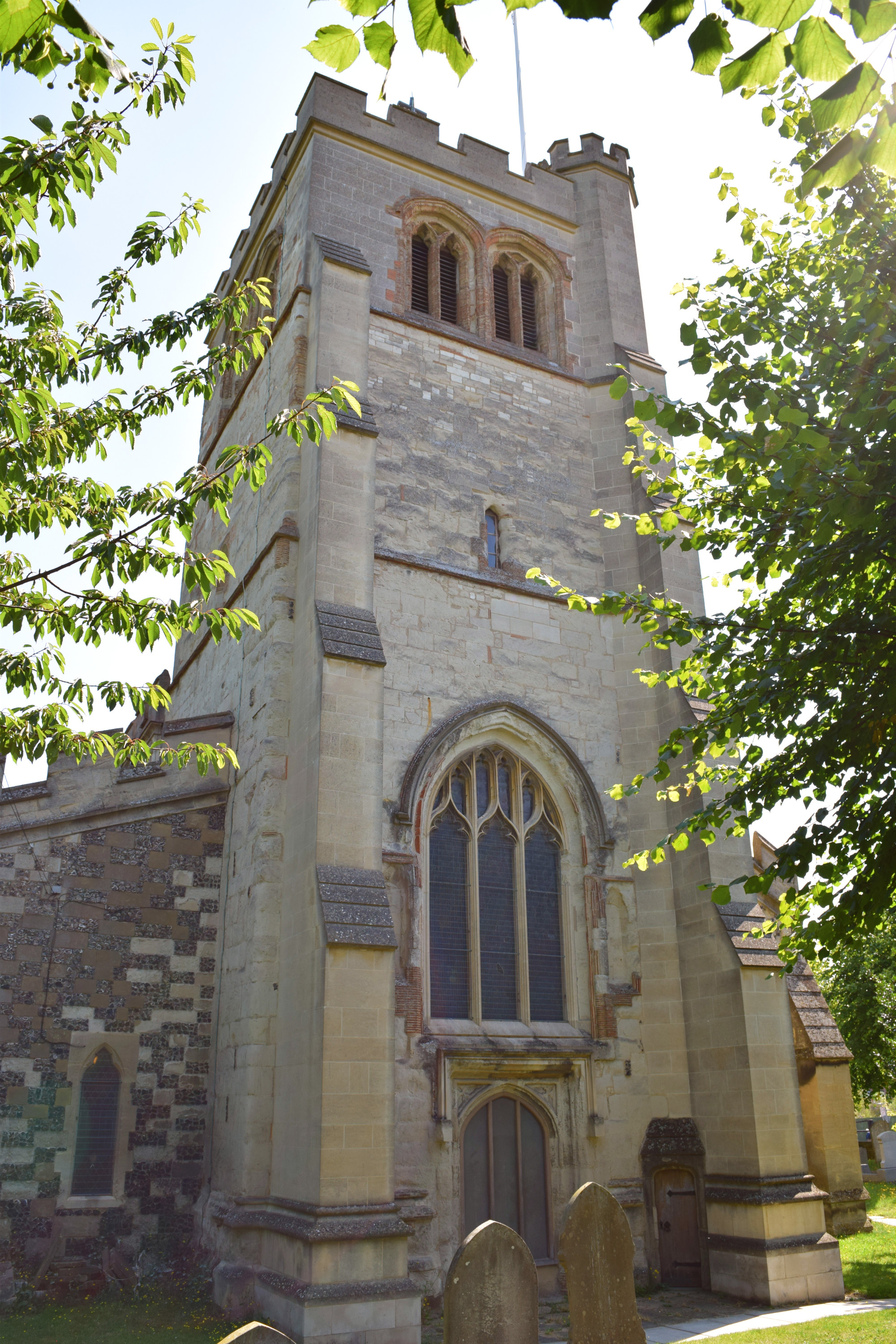
Tower and part of the west end

Charles O'Brien and Nikolaus Pevsner, in the 2014 revised edition of Bedfordshire, Huntingdonshire and Peterborough in the Pevsner Buildings of England series, describe All Saints as "a stately church".

The style of the building is mainly Perpendicular (or Rectilinear) Gothic, with some early Curvilinear elements such as the east window in the south aisle. It consists of a chancel, a nave of five bays and clerestory, side aisles, south porch, and tower.

On the outside All Saints’ is characterized by its flint and Totternhoe stone checker work, the battlements, and the stone grotesques which adorn the walls. Battlements were added to the chancel in the 19th century whilst it was being extensively renovated by George Somers Clarke. The cluch, a relatively hard chalk from the Chiltern Hills, used here has been sourced locally, since the construction of the church, for most restoration works. For example, in the 2019 restoration of the outer fabric was provided by H.G. Clarke and Son of Totternhoe.

=== Tower ===
The embattled western tower with an octagonal turret at the south-west angle was remodelled and raised to 70 ft in the 15th century. The cross above the tower is a later addition, to which a weathercock was then added in 1750 that fell during a storm in the 19th century. The tower also houses six bells, a spacious ringing chamber, and a beautiful Victorian stained glass window, flanked by medieval canopied niches.

The specifications of the bells are as follows: the treble (John Briant, Hertford, 1815); Second (John Briant, 1816); Third (Newcombe, 1616, recast 1899 by Taylor); Fourth (John Briant, Hertford, 1811); Fifth (John Dier, 1580, recast 1899 by Taylor); and the tenor (Anthony Chandler, 1673).

=== Norman baptismal font ===
The circular Norman font of Totternhoe stone is the oldest known part of the church, having been constructed well before the present building was even begun. The font is one of a number of fonts known collectively as the 'Aylesbury Group' after a particularly fine example in the parish church at Aylesbury. It is made of Totternhoe stone, and its elaborate carvings and cable moulding are particularly good. The lid is made out of reclaimed timber from Houghton Hall. Sir Stephen Glynne, writing before 1840, described it in his Church Notes, as "remarkably fine" and "very richly sculptured throughout".

=== Sewell tomb and south aisle chantry ===
In the south aisle wall is a tomb with the effigy of a knight at with a lion at his feet. This is reputedly the tomb of John de Sewell who accompanied the Black Prince to Aquitaine in 1366 in the retinue of Hugh, Earl of Stafford. It is carved with quatrefoils framing heraldic shields displaying a chevron and three butterflies or stylised bees— the Sewell Arms. Under the tomb are carvings representing the same coat of arms. A medieval piscina and decorated ceiling above the east end of the aisle indicate that an altar stood nearby. And indeed, this area of the church may have been a chantry chapel for John de Sewell and his family.

=== Nave ceiling ===
The nave ceiling dates to latter part of the 14th century (or the beginning of the 15th); it is a simple but elegant example of Rectilinear gothic architecture. It is supported by stone corbels in the shape of animals and mythical creatures, and it is decorated with carved oak figures of monks bearing shields or coat of arms. These figures are visible reminders of the connection between All Saints’ and the St Albans’ Abbey. To the east end of the nave, the ceiling is more elaborately decorated, with bosses and vine leaf motifs, then the rest of the ceiling, providing a “canopy of honour” for the Cross (or Rood), and marking the original position of the Rood Screen.

=== Chancel ===
The chancel, Rectilinear in style, was partly rebuilt in the 19th century, under the direction of Somers Clarke, after many decades of neglect. At that time the chancel arch was reopened. The restoration also preserved many other original features, such as the medieval wall safes. The altar rail, made from the reclaimed staircase banister of Houghton Hall, divides the chancel in two areas: choir and sanctuary.

The floor is mostly paved with the stone monuments to members of the Brandreth family, save for the chequered marble flooring around the altar and, most notably, two brasses. These bear the effigy of two priests connected to All Saints'; the larger one is of William Walley, 15th century vicar of All Saints', the smaller of John Walley (a relative, of William Walley).

=== High altar triptych ===
The high altar triptych was gifted to All Saints’ in memory of Fr Colin Gay SSC, Honorary Assistant Priest from 2002 to 2015 and dedicated by the Rt Revd Norman Banks, Bishop of Richborough, on 26 June 2023.

The central panel measures 210 cm by 131 cm, and the side panels 105 cm by 131 cm. It can be closed during Lent and Passiontide remaining at 210 cm in width. It depicts Christ in glory with the Blessed Virgin Mary and St John the Evangelist in the central panel, St George the Martyr and St John the Baptist in the right section, St Wilfrid and St Theodore of Amasea in the left panel. The piece was painted by Nechita Laurentiu, a Romanian icon writer, using gold leaf. The artist has worked for the Patriarch of the Romanian Orthodox Church, and he has a number of pieces displayed in UK church (e.g. the “Frank Weston altar” at St Matthew's Willesden). The triptych was originally commissioned in 2007 for Preston Minster by the vicar, Fr Timothy Lipscomb, and the PCC. It was placed above the High Altar, encased between the back riddel posts. However, it was sold off in 2020 to a church furniture dealer, where it was purchased by a parishioner of All Saints'.

=== Stained glass ===
Above the vicinity of the Sewell tomb, in the Lady Chapel, and in the tower there are rather good examples of Victorian stained glass by Thomas Baillie. The west end window was unveiled in 1891 to commemorate the Revd Hugh Blagg Smyth, and it depicts the Resurrection of Jesus, the Baptism of the Lord, and the Institution of the Eucharist. The two windows in the Lady chapel commemorate Smyth's daughter Minna and his wife, dating from 1864. The one above the Sewell tomb commemorates George Marshall, churchwarden.

=== Pipe organ ===
The organ is two manual and pedal instrument, dates from approximately 1880 and 1914. It was originally believed to have been built by Nicholson and Lord of Walsall. However, in 2021 during cleaning and refurbishment works by Pipe Organ Services it was discovered that the organ was originally built by C. M. Walker of London and only later rebuilt by Nicholson and Lord of Walsall. Several additional stops (including the full-length Conacher trumpet) were installed by Kenneth Breedon of Bletchley in 1992.

== Known restorations and works to the fabric ==
Date	Type of Work	Notes	Architect	Contractors	Cost
1580	Installation of a bell	The "fifth bell" was recast in 1899 by Taylor of Loughborough		Newcombe foundry of Leicester	
1616	Installation of a bell	The "third bell" was recast in 1899 by Taylor of Loughborough		Newcombe foundry of Leicester	
1673	Installation of a bell	Tenor		Anthony Chandler foundry of Drayton Parslow	
1750	Installation of weathercock on top of tower cross				
1774	Addition of a gallery at the west end of the church				
1811-1816	Installation of three bells	"Fourth" (1811), Treble (1815), and "Second" (1816)		John Briant, of Hertford	
1824-1825	Repointing of the tower; Repairs			Haselgrove (masonry), Willoughby (glazing and plumbing), William Doncombe	£193
1828	Repairs			Scriven (carpenters), William Doncombe	£100
1830	Stuccoing and other repairs			Stevens (plasterer), Giddons (plumbing), French	£187
1841-1843	Roof repairs, Repewing of the church, enlarging the gallery, new pulpit		Roote	French (carpentry), Tofield (pews), Geo. Giddings (plumbing and painting)	£460
1856-1567	Restoration work to the fabric (nave and north aisle), Repositioning of the font, Roof repairs, Taking down of the gallery		Henry Clutton John Cumberland (Clerk of Works)	Tofiled	£297
1864	Installation of Lady Chapel stained glass windows	Public subscription by 1,000 people to commemorate the vicar's daughter Minna, and Mrs Blagg Smyth, his wife.		Thomas Baillie	
1867-1869	Restoration work to the outside of the fabric (south aisle)	Chancel and tower remain in severe disrepair	Somers Clarke	Marshall of Houghton Regis	£1800
1879-1880	Partial rebuilding and restoration of the chancel, Reseating of the church	Funded by lay rector, Henry Chernocke Gibbs Brandreth (£2000) and by the Parish	Somers Clarke	Marshall of Houghton Regis (builders, Hammer of London (pews)	£2439
1892	Restoration of the tower				£1,100
1899	Recasting of two bells			Taylor's Bell Foundry, Loughborough	
1913	Installation and consecration of the new high altar	The altar is dedicated to the memory of the soldiers from Houghton Regis who died in World War I			
1913	Installation of choir stalls	The stalls feature heraldic elements of the Brandreth family. The widow of H.C. Gibbs Brandreth is patron.			
1929	Installation of a new tower clock	Donated in memory of Jeremiah Barrett by his son Walter			
1987-1992	Restoration of the tower	This major project took several years to begin as it was entirely funded locally			£250,000
2016	All Saints' is added to the Heritage at Risk Register				
2019	Major restoration work to the outside of the fabric, Reseating of the east end,	Funded by the National Lottery Heritage Fund (under the Grants for Places of Worship scheme) (£250,000), Houghton Regis Town Council, and Beds and Herts Historic Churches Trust	Matthew Stevens (Michael Dales Partnership)	Weldon Stone	£270,000
2019	All Saints' is removed from the Heritage at Risk Register				
2020	Construction of Memorial Path in churchyard	Funded by public subscription and by members of the congregation The path reconnected the main entrance of All Saints' with the south east gate of the churchyard	Matthew Stevens (Michael Dales Partnership)	AM Builders Luton	£30,000
2020-2021	Cleaning and refurbishment of church organ	Funded by the parish and by a member of the congregation.		Pipe Organ Services	£35,000
2021-2022	Electrical works, partial rewiring, replacement of tower lights			CLS Electrical Services	£3,500
2023	Surface water drainage works	Funded by the National Churches Trust, Beds and Herts Historic Churches Trust, and other charities.	Matthew Stevens (Michael Dales Partnership)	AM Builders Luton	£35,000
2023	Installation of energy-efficient lights			Works carried out by volunteers	£500
2023	Reordering of the Sanctuary, Installation of high altar triptych	Triptych salvaged from Preston Minster, donated in memory of Father Colin Gay by his partner, and dedicated in June 2023 by Norman, Bishop of Richborough		Works carried out by volunteers	£2,500
2024	Replacement of sound system	Part-funded by Central Bedfordshire Council representatives for Houghton Regis, an anonymous donor, and the AllChurches Trust		Keystone Sound Systems	£13,000

== Vicars, parish priests, and patrons of All Saints' ==
The patronage of the parish (or advowson), meaning the right to present or put forward a person to be inducted as vicar, was exercised by the person or institution owning church land. St Albans Abbey was granted the right when it received All Saints' land in 1153. After the Dissolution, English monarchs, the Brandreth family, the Dukes of Bedford, and other individuals exercised this right over the centuries. The advowson currently rests with the Board of Patronage of the Diocese of St Albans.

Both the lists of Priests, Chaplains (Cappellani), and Vicars of Houghton Regis preserved at All Saints’ Parish Church and Bedfordshire Archives begin in 1226. The names of those who ministered in the parish before this time are not known. The following list is the one preserved at the county archives.

	Date	Parish Priest	Patron	Notes
1	1226	Stephen de Herdewicke	Abbot & Convent of St Albans	
2	1241	Roger	Abbot & Convent of St Albans	on resignation of Stephen de Herdewicke
3	1265, 27 October	Walter de Cameseya	Abbot & Convent of St Albans	on death of Roger
4		John de Dunstaple (Dunstable)	Abbot & Convent of St Albans	
5	1272, 3 May	William de Labho	Michael Picot and Johan his wife by licence from King Edward I	on death of John de Dunstaple
6	1283	Walter de Kemesey	Abbot & Convent of St Albans	
7	1291, 16 June	Simon de Wendover	Abbot & Convent of St Albans	
8		Adam de Sewell	Abbot & Convent of St Albans	
9	1336, 23 March	William de Eyton	Abbot & Convent of St Albans	on resignation of Adam de Sewell
10	1337, 27 June	Robert de Morton	Abbot & Convent of St Albans	on resignation of William de Eyton
11		John Walleys	Abbot & Convent of St Albans	Buried in the chancel alongside William Walley (a relative of his). Commemorative brass also in the chancel.
12	1412, 18 April	John Buneker	Abbot & Convent of St Albans	on death of John Waleys
13	1448, 27 July	Thomas Copto (or Copton)	Abbot & Convent of St Albans	on death of John Buneker
14	1458, 18 June	Robert Russelle	Abbot & Convent of St Albans	on resignation of Thomas Copto, from Rectory of Hardwardstoke, Diocese of London
15	1459, 2 March	Robert Tomlynson	Abbot & Convent of St Albans	on death of Robert Russelle
16	1481, 6 November	Thomas Standyssh, MA	Abbot & Convent of St Albans	on death of Robert Tomlynson
17	1493, 20 October	William Walley	Abbot & Convent of St Albans	on death of Thomas Standyssh; Buried in the chancel along with John Walley (a relative of his). Commemorative brass also in the chancel.
18	1506, 21 June	Thomas Rither, BA	Abbot & Convent of St Albans	on death of William Walley
19	1526 and 1534	William Fossey	Abbot & Convent of St Albans	recorded as vicar at two dates; registered as brother of Guild of Holy Trinity, Luton
20	1554, 14 November	John Cowper	John Tymse, yeoman	on death of last vicar The advowson is passed to Tymse from the "Abbot and Convent of Monastery of St Albans".
21	1557, 14 November	Maurice Penyall	Queen Mary I and King Philip II of Spain	on death of John Cowper. This entry is missing from the list preserved at All Saints' Parish Church. Penyall is recorded also in the list of vicars of Caddington, 14 March 1561. The advowson rests now with the Monarch.
22	1563, 24 March	George Johnson	Queen Elizabeth I	presented on petition of Mr Brocket
23	1567, 29 August	George Mydelton	Queen Elizabeth I	presented on petition of Bishop Nicholas Bullingham, Bishop of Lincoln
24	1588, 4 May	John Fabian, MA	Queen Elizabeth I	on death of George Mydelton
25	1588, 14 November	Thomas Butler	Queen Elizabeth I	on death of John Fabian
26	1588, 11 December	Roger Rogers	Queen Elizabeth I	on death of Thomas Butler, instituted 17 December 1588
27	1607, 23 June	Thomas Tompkins, MA	Lord Keeper of Great Seal - Thomas Egerton, 1st Viscount Brackley	on recommendation of Sir Richard Spencer; married Phoebe Eames on 1 Aug 1607
28	1659, 27 April	Richard Scott	Henry Brandreth of London, merchant	Brandreth acquires the advowson from John Egerton, 1st Earl of Bridgewater in 1653
29		John Littlejohn	Henry Brandreth of London	ordained priest by Thomas Morton, Bishop of Durham, 23 October 1658. Littlejohn is recorded at Salford (Bedfordshire) in 1690.
30	1660, 18 September	Andrew Cater	Henry Brandreth of London	on resignation of Littlejohn
31	1661, 17 August	James Paddon	Henry Brandreth of London	buried 25 Apr 1704
32	1704, 26 September	Valentine Cressy, BA	Nehemiah Brandreth	on death of James Paddon; buried 27 Aug 1728
33	1728, 16 September	Jacobus Bradshaw	Henry Brandreth (2nd)	on death of Valentine Cressey; buried 24 Dec 1738
34	1739, 9 May	John Wilkinson, STB		on death of James Bradshaw; also vicar of Flitwick Around 1750 Henry Brandreth (3rd) (great-grandson of the Henry "of London") sells the estate to the Duke of Bedford. The advowson is passed to the Duke.
35	1759, 31 May	Potts Davies, BA	John Russell, 4th Duke of Bedford	on death of John Wilkinson
36	1768, 13 May	Edmund Wodley, BA	John Russell, 4th Duke of Bedford	
37	1808, 20 August	Thomas Cave, MA	John Russell, 6th Duke of Bedford	
38	1819, 18 February	John Donne	John Russell, 6th Duke of Bedford	on death of Thomas Cave. Donne is buried at the east end of All Saints' churchyard.
39	1846, 1 September	William Wilson	Francis Russell, 7th Duke of Bedford	on death of John Donne
40	1856, 16 January	Hugh Blagg Smyth, MA	Francis Russell, 7th Duke of Bedford	
41	1880	Daniel Pring Alford, MA	Henry Chernocke Gibbs Brandreth	Manor lands of Houghton Regis are reacquired by the Brandreth family, along with the advowson.
42	1883	William Faux Lovell, MA	Henry Chernocke Gibbs Brandreth	
43	1899, March	William Wedge, BA	Henry Chernocke Gibbs Brandreth	
44	1912, July	Frederick Charles Mahony, MA	Evelyn Lawton, widow of H.C. Gibbs Brandreth	
45	1928, February	Charles Henry Fletcher	S.L. Elbourne	
46	1952, July	Leslie Blackburn, BA	Prebendary W. F. Buttle	
47	1975	Geoffrey Martin Neal, AKC	Diocesan Board of Patronage (Diocese of St Albans)	
48	1996	Jonathan Francis Redvers-Harris, LLM	Diocesan Board of Patronage (Diocese of St Albans)	on resignation of Geoffrey Neal
49	2003	Brian Clifford Wheelhouse SSC, BTh	Diocesan Board of Patronage (Diocese of St Albans)	on resignation of Jonathan Redvers-Harris
50	2015, 1 June	Diego Galanzino, MA	Diocesan Board of Patronage (Diocese of St Albans)	Priest-in-charge, on resignation of Brian Wheelhouse

== Gallery ==
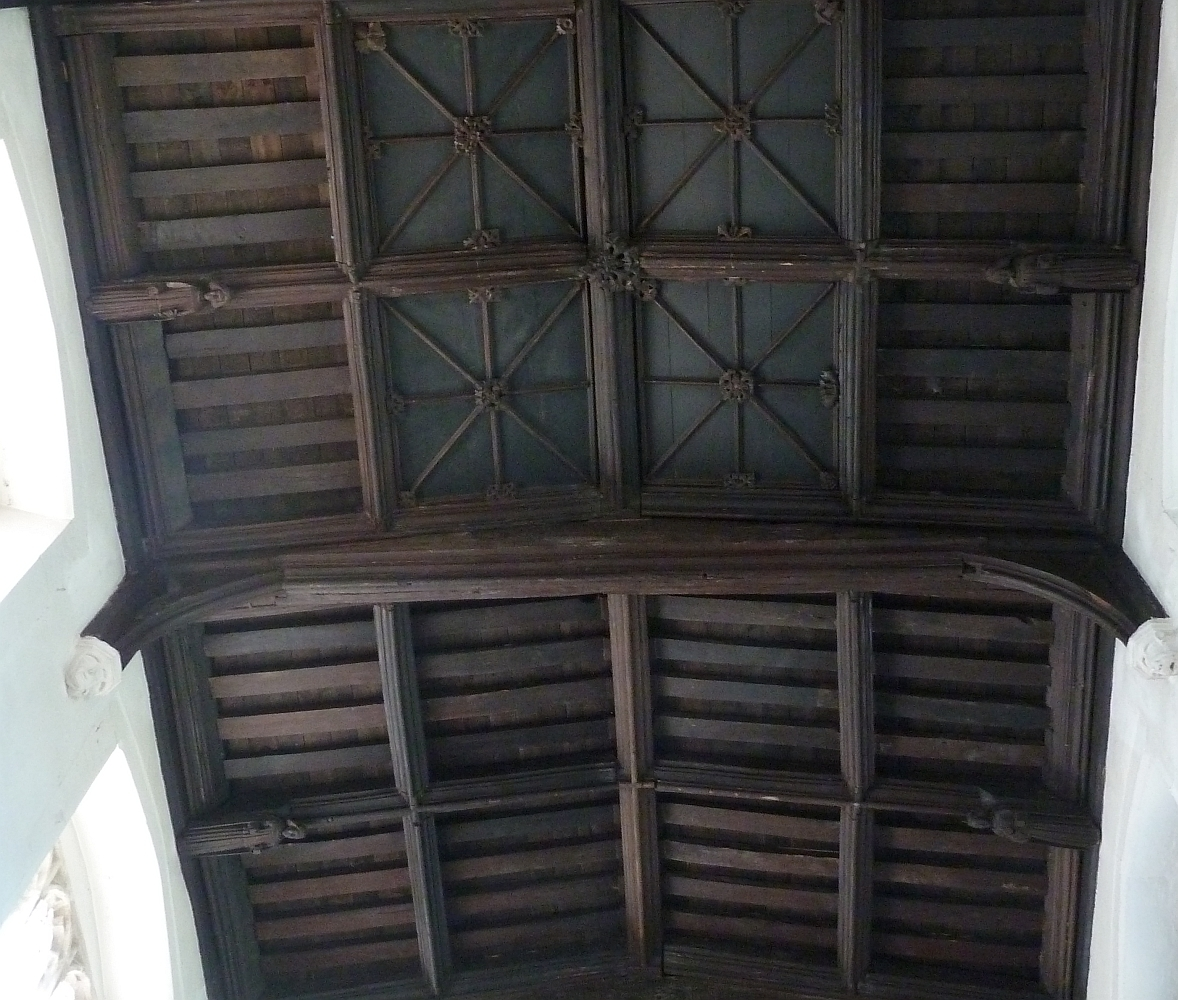
Nave roof

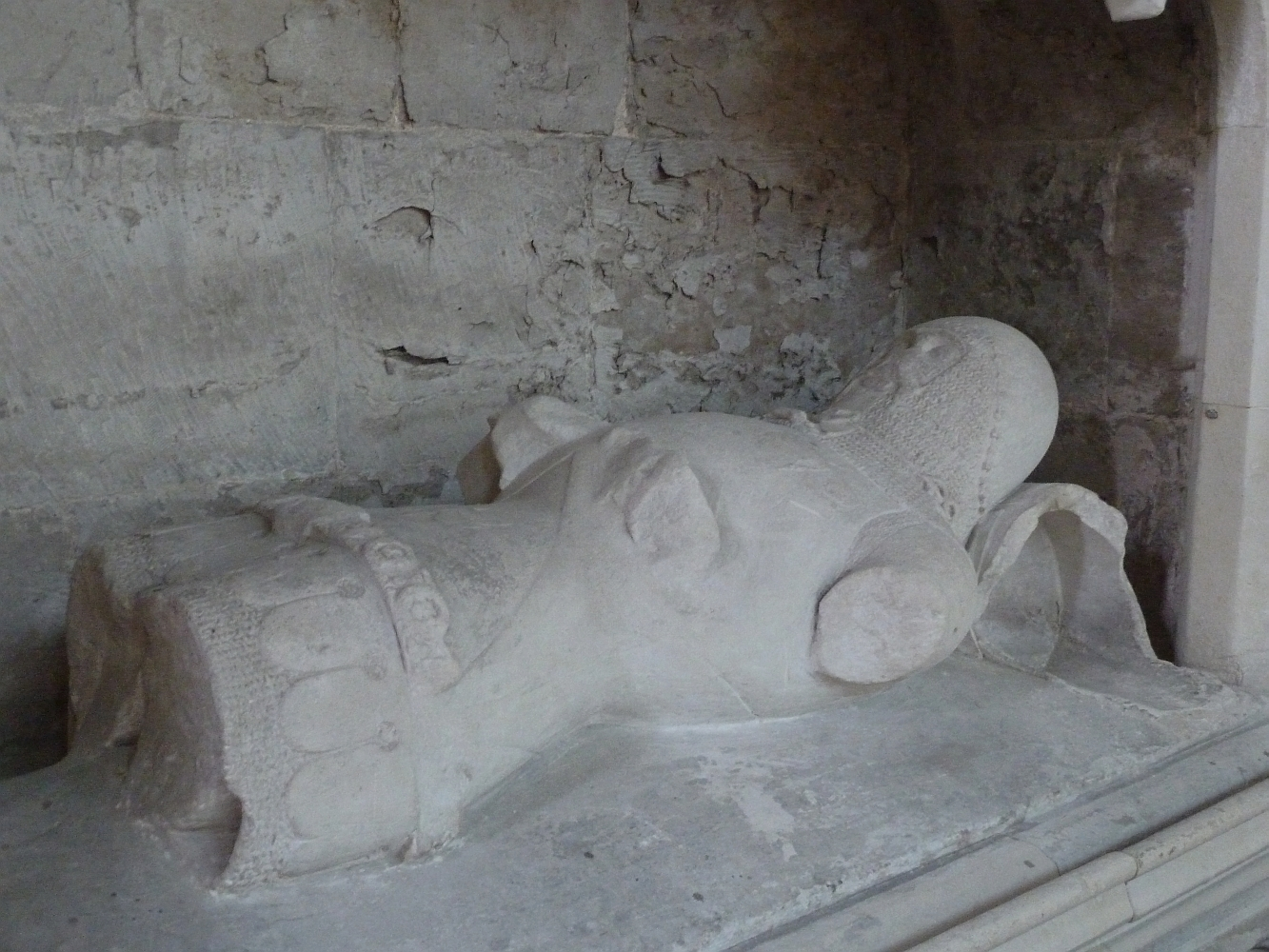
Monument to Sir John Sewell

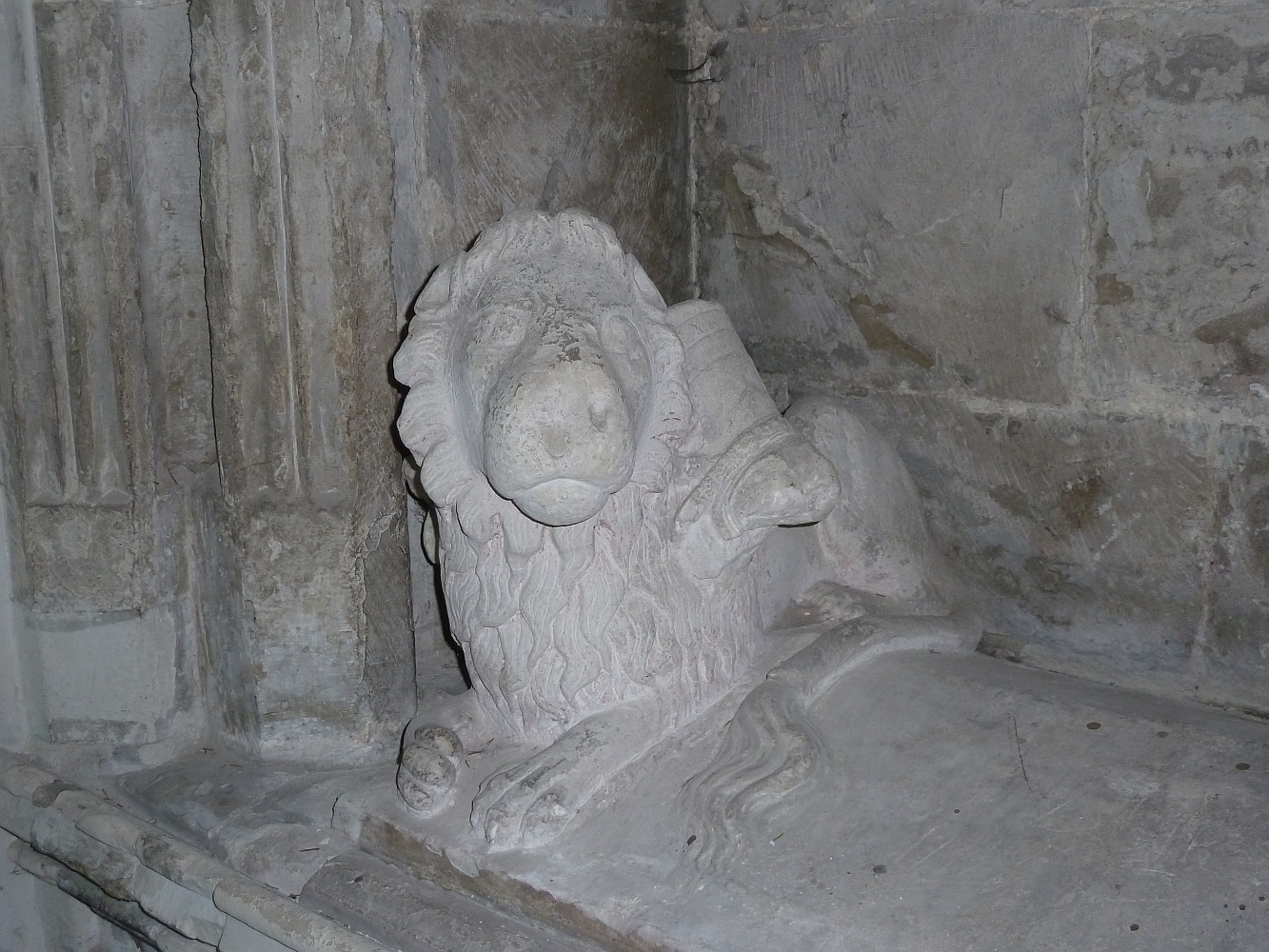
Carved lion

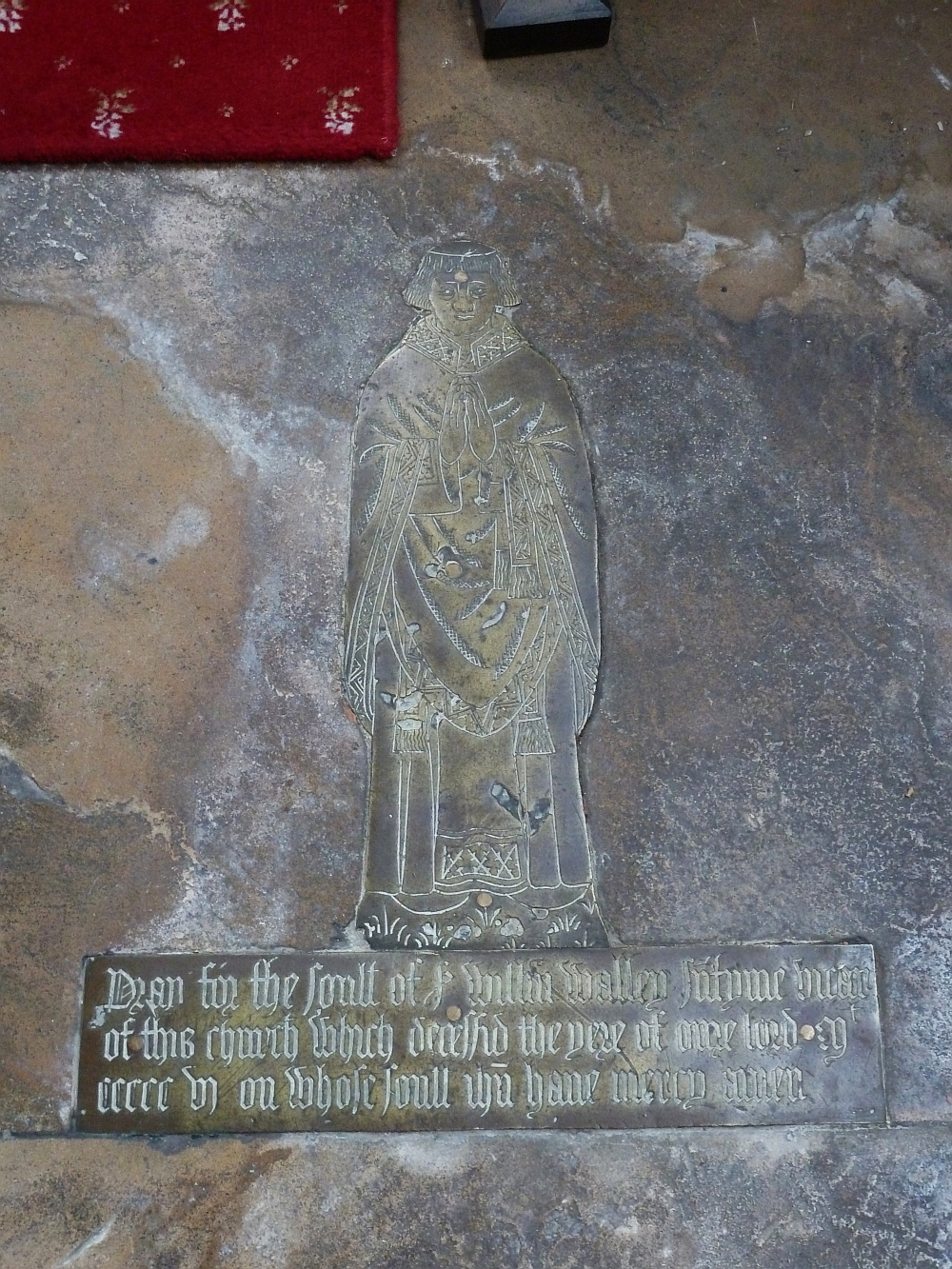
Brass memorial to Sir William Walley

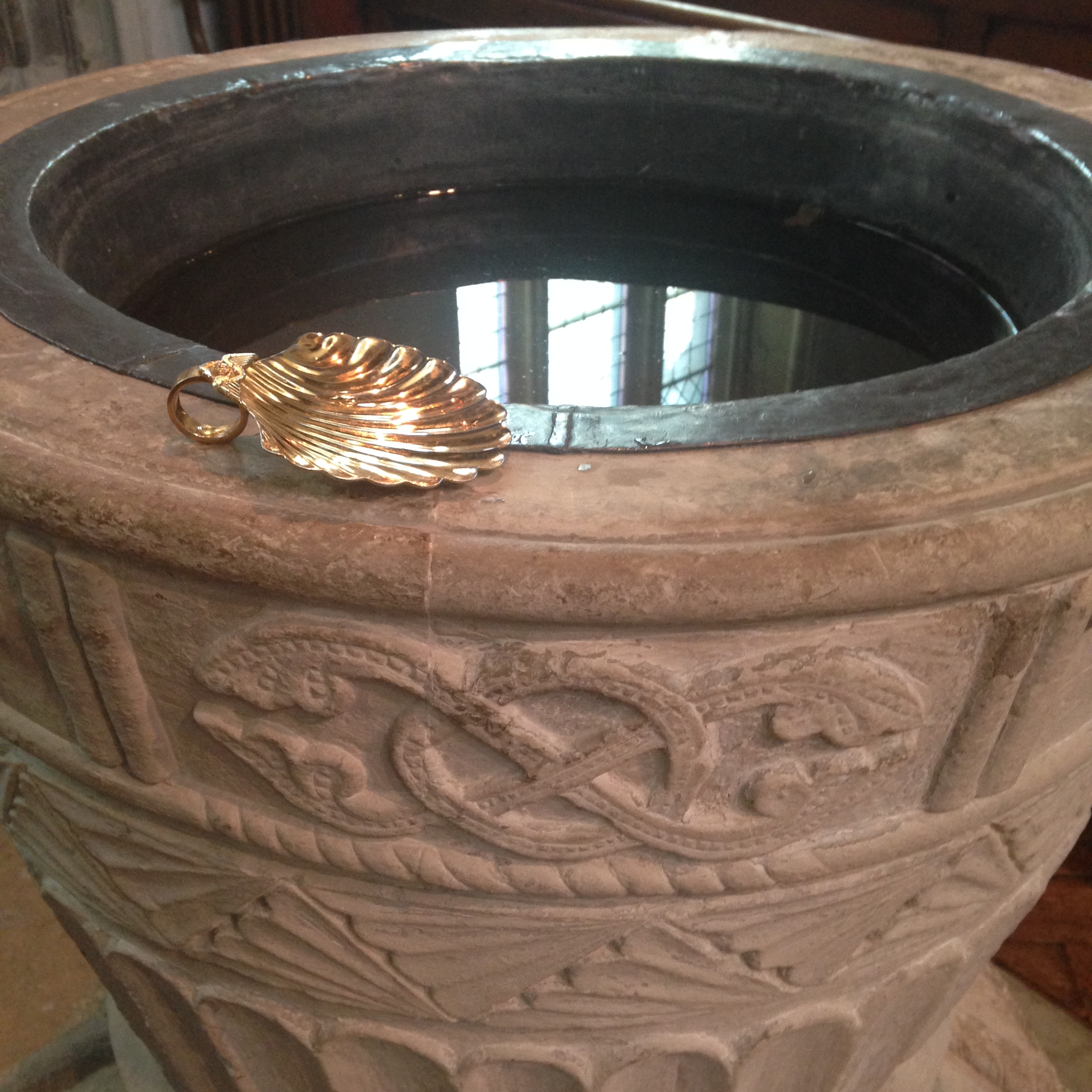
Detail of the Norman font

== See also ==
- Grade I listed buildings in Bedfordshire
