= Totternhoe nature reserve =

Nature reserve in Bedfordshire, England

Coordinates: 51.8895°N 0.57749°W

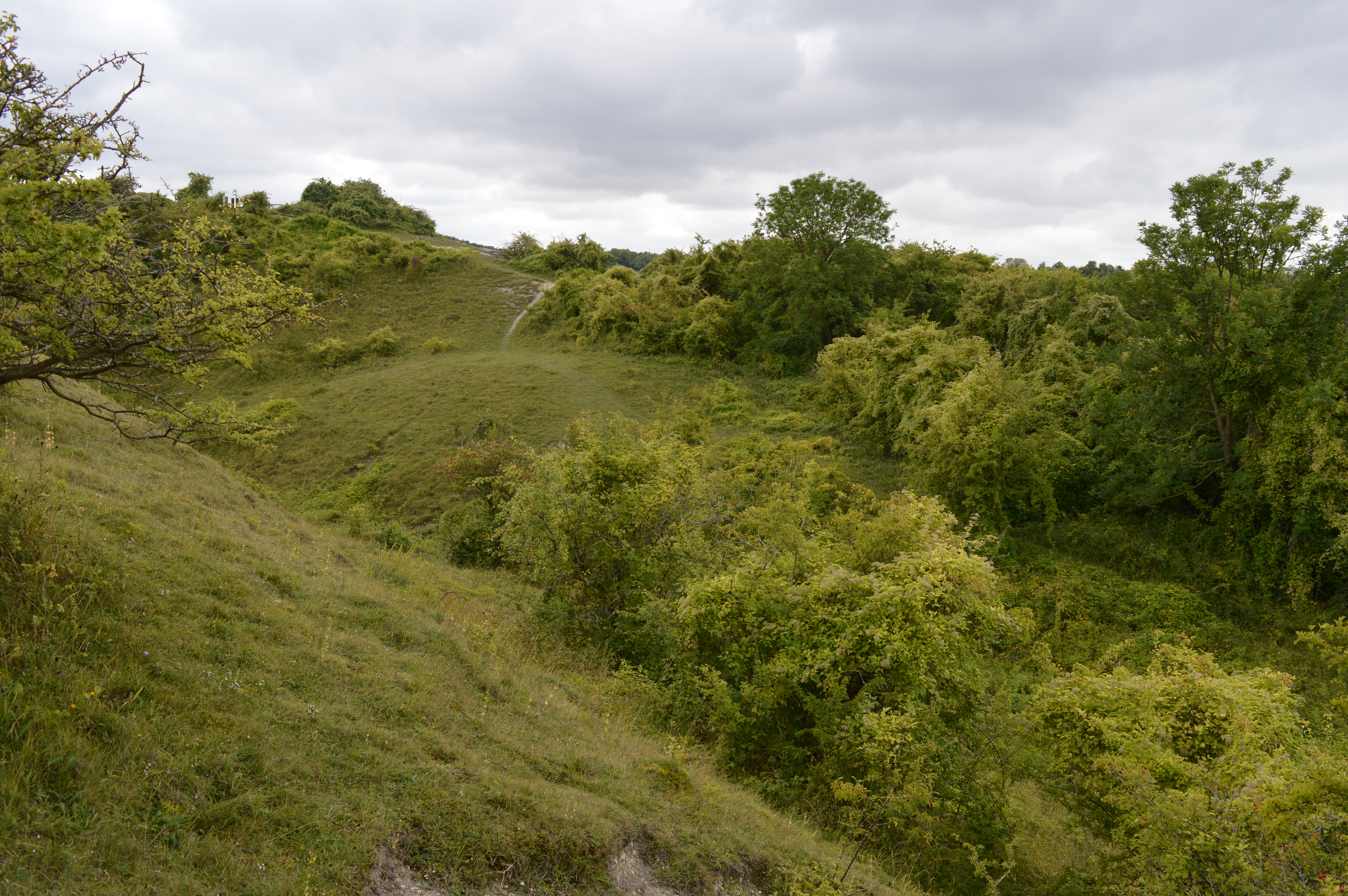
The steep slopes of Totterhoe Chalk Quarry

Totternhoe nature reserve is managed by the Wildlife Trust for Bedfordshire, Cambridgeshire and Northamptonshire (WTBCN). The 31-hectare (77-acre) site is in Totternhoe in Bedfordshire, and it includes parts of three Sites of Special Scientific Interest (SSSIs). Totternhoe Knolls is a biological SSSI owned by Central Bedfordshire Council and leased to the National Trust. Most of it is managed jointly by the National Trust and the WTBCN, excluding Totternhoe Castle, the earthworks of a Norman motte-and-bailey castle which is part of the SSSI but not of WTBCN's nature reserve. Totternhoe nature reserve also includes the geological SSSI, Totternhoe Stone Pit, which is not open to the public, and other areas owned by WTBCN, including part of Totternhoe Chalk Quarry, another biological SSSI.

Much of the site is former quarries for Totternhoe stone, a durable chalk which was used in building Westminster Abbey. This has left steeply sloping spoil heaps now grasslands which are rich in flowers, including many species of orchids, such as Cowslips, which are the favourite food of the caterpillars of the rare Duke of Burgundy butterfly. The site is also the best place in Bedfordshire to see the scarce small blue butterfly.

The site has a National Trust car park off Castle Hill Road. There is also access to Totternhoe Chalk Quarry by a footpath from Sewell Cutting in Houghton Regis.
