= Totternhoe Knolls =

Nature reserve in Bedfordshire, England

Coordinates: 51.8852°N 0.5688°W

- Site of Special Scientific Interest
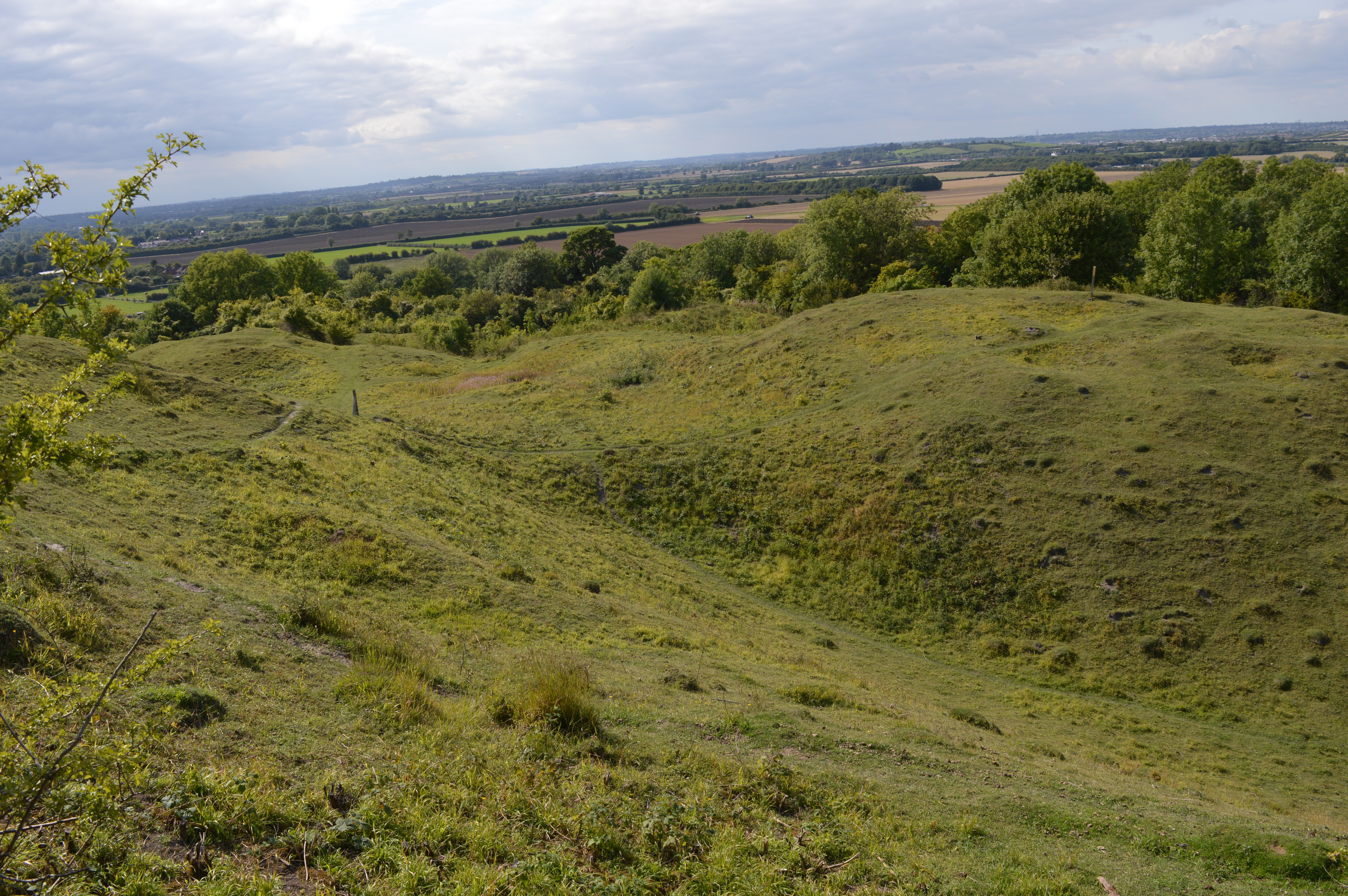
- Location of Totternhoe Knolls.
- Area of search: Bedfordshire
- Grid reference: SP979220
- Interest: Biological
- Area: 13.1 ha (32 acres)
- Notification date: 1985
- Location map: Magic Map

Totternhoe Knolls is a 13.1-hectare (32-acre) Site of Special Scientific Interest (SSSI) in Totternhoe in Bedfordshire. It is also a local nature reserve, and part of the Chilterns Area of Outstanding Natural Beauty. The site is owned by Central Bedfordshire Council and leased to the National Trust. Most of the site is maintained jointly by the National Trust and the Wildlife Trust for Bedfordshire, Cambridgeshire and Northamptonshire (WTBCN), and is part of the WTBCN Totternhoe nature reserve, which also includes Totternhoe Chalk Quarry and Totternhoe Stone Pit. The SSSI also includes Totternhoe Castle, the earthworks of a Norman motte-and-bailey castle which is a Scheduled monument.

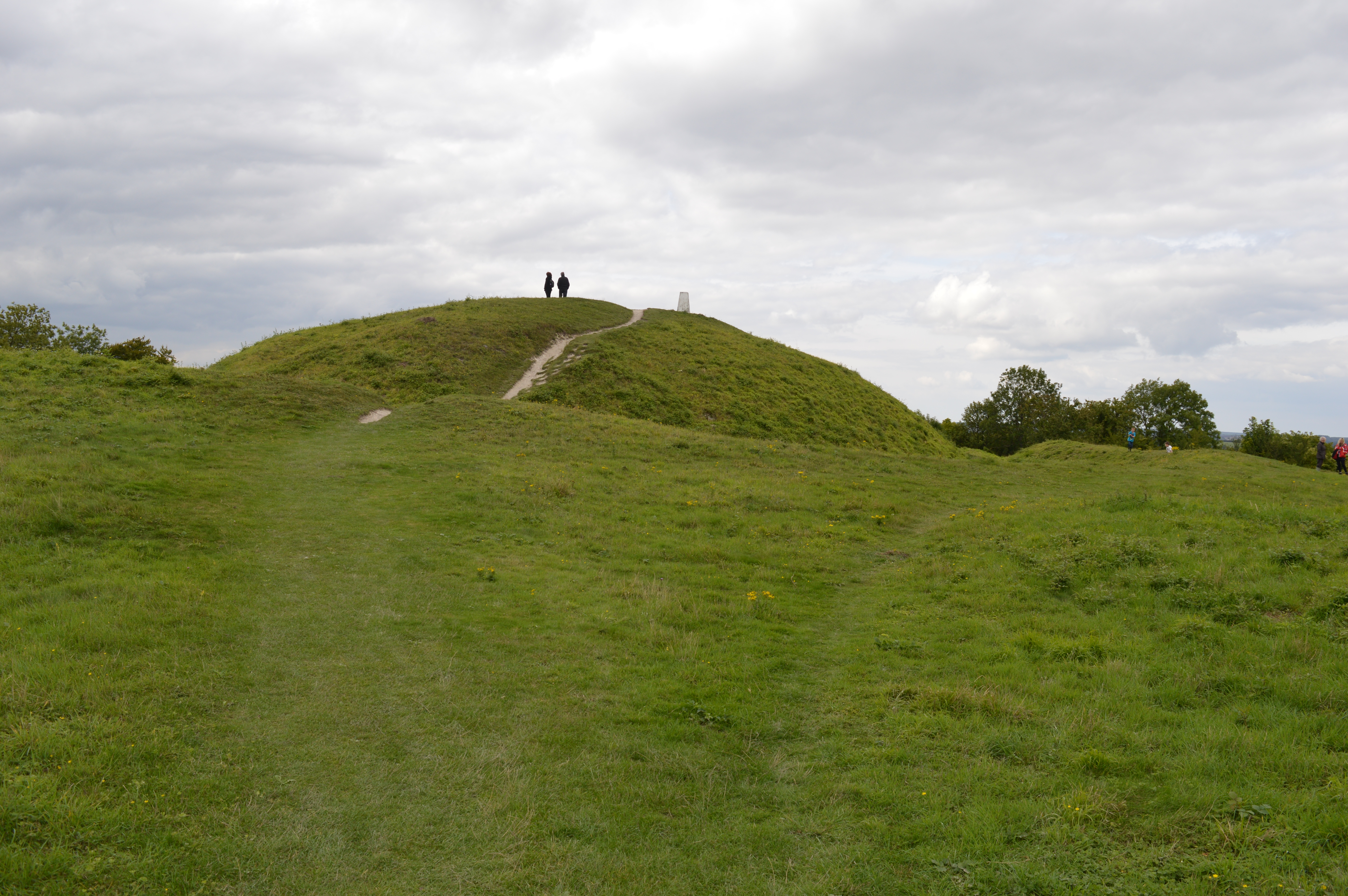
Totternhoe Castle mound

Part of the site was formerly a quarry where Totternhoe Stone, a strong type of chalk that was used in Westminster Abbey, was mined. This part is now grassland with a rich variety of plant species, including some that are now rare; these are characteristic species of chalk downland and include kidney vetch, horseshoe vetch, large thyme, squinancywort, autumn gentian, clustered bellflower, sainfoin and dwarf thistle. Orchids that grow here include common spotted orchid, Herminium monorchis Musk orchid, Orchis anthropophora Man orchid, bee orchid and twayblade . There are a wide variety of invertebrates, including butterflies such as the common blue, the chalkhill blue, and the scarce small blue and Duke of Burgundy fritillary.

Totternhoe Castle was probably built in the late eleventh century. Only the earthworks survive, with a mound five metres tall and 40 metres wide. It is unusual in having three baileys.

There is access from the National Trust car park off Castle Hill Road.
