= Totternhoe Chalk Quarry =

Chalk quarry in Bedfordshire, England

Coordinates: 51.891883°N 0.567876°W

- Site of Special Scientific Interest
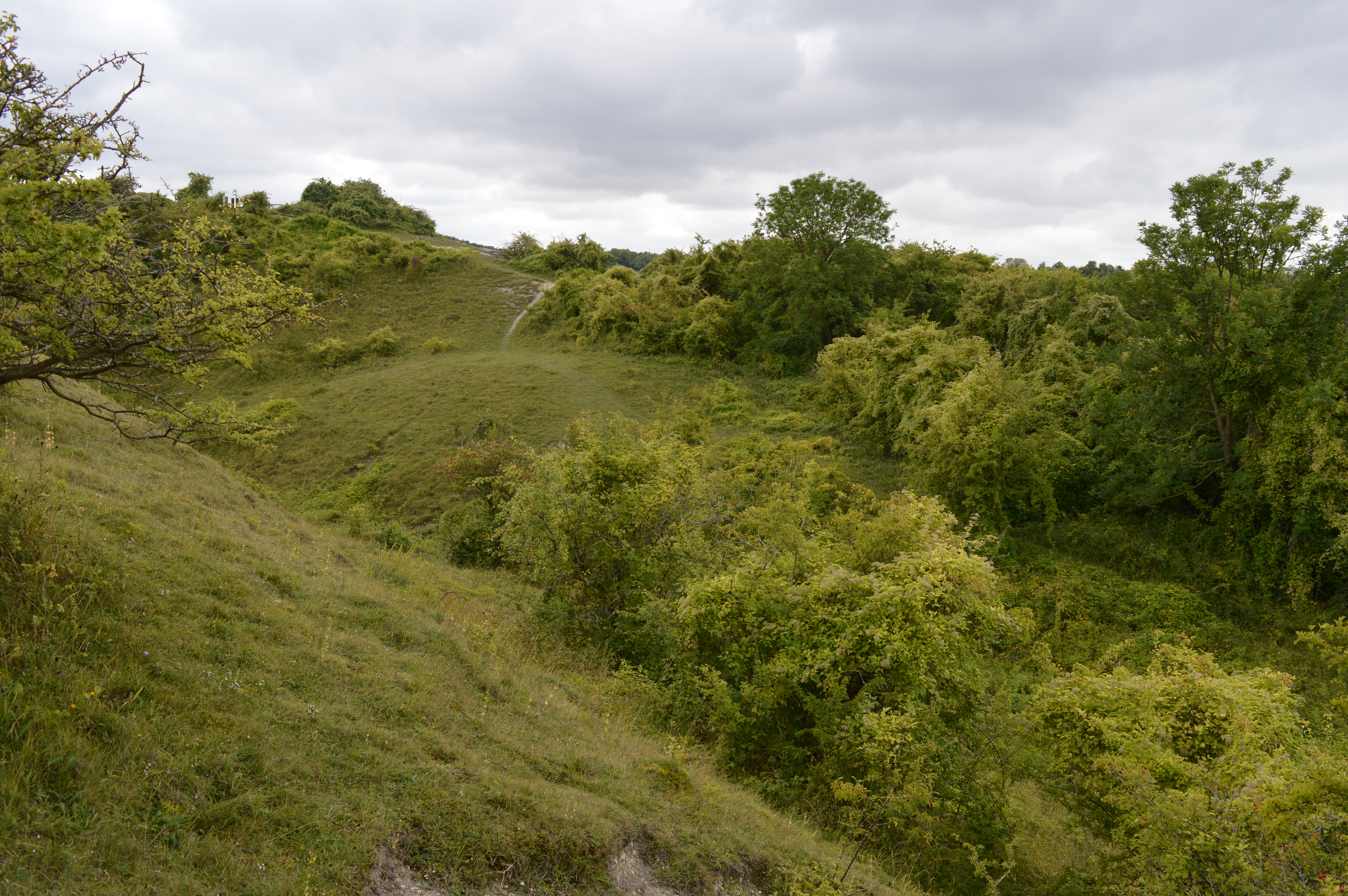
- Location of Totternhoe Chalk Quarry.
- Area of search: Bedfordshire
- Grid reference: SP986225
- Interest: Biological
- Area: 13.4 ha (33 acres)
- Notification date: 1990
- Location map: Magic Map

Totternhoe Chalk Quarry is a 13.4-hectare (33-acre) biological Site of Special Scientific Interest in Totternhoe in Bedfordshire. Part of it lies in Totternhoe nature reserve, which is managed by the Wildlife Trust for Bedfordshire, Cambridgeshire and Northamptonshire. The site is part of the Chilterns Area of Outstanding Natural Beauty.

The site is a disused medieval quarry for Totternhoe stone, a durable chalk which was used for buildings including Westminster Abbey. The steeply sloping spoil heaps have developed into grasslands which have a wide variety of flowers, including orchids. Grass chalkland is a habitat under threat, and the site has a number of rare plant species, including great pignut. It also has butterflies such as the chalkhill blue and the nationally rare Duke of Burgundy.

There is access from a footpath between Sewell Cutting and Totternhoe and from Totternhoe Knolls, which is also part of Totternhoe nature reserve.
