= Church End, Totternhoe =

Hamlet in Bedfordshire, England

Coordinates: 51.86971°N 0.5603°W

Church End
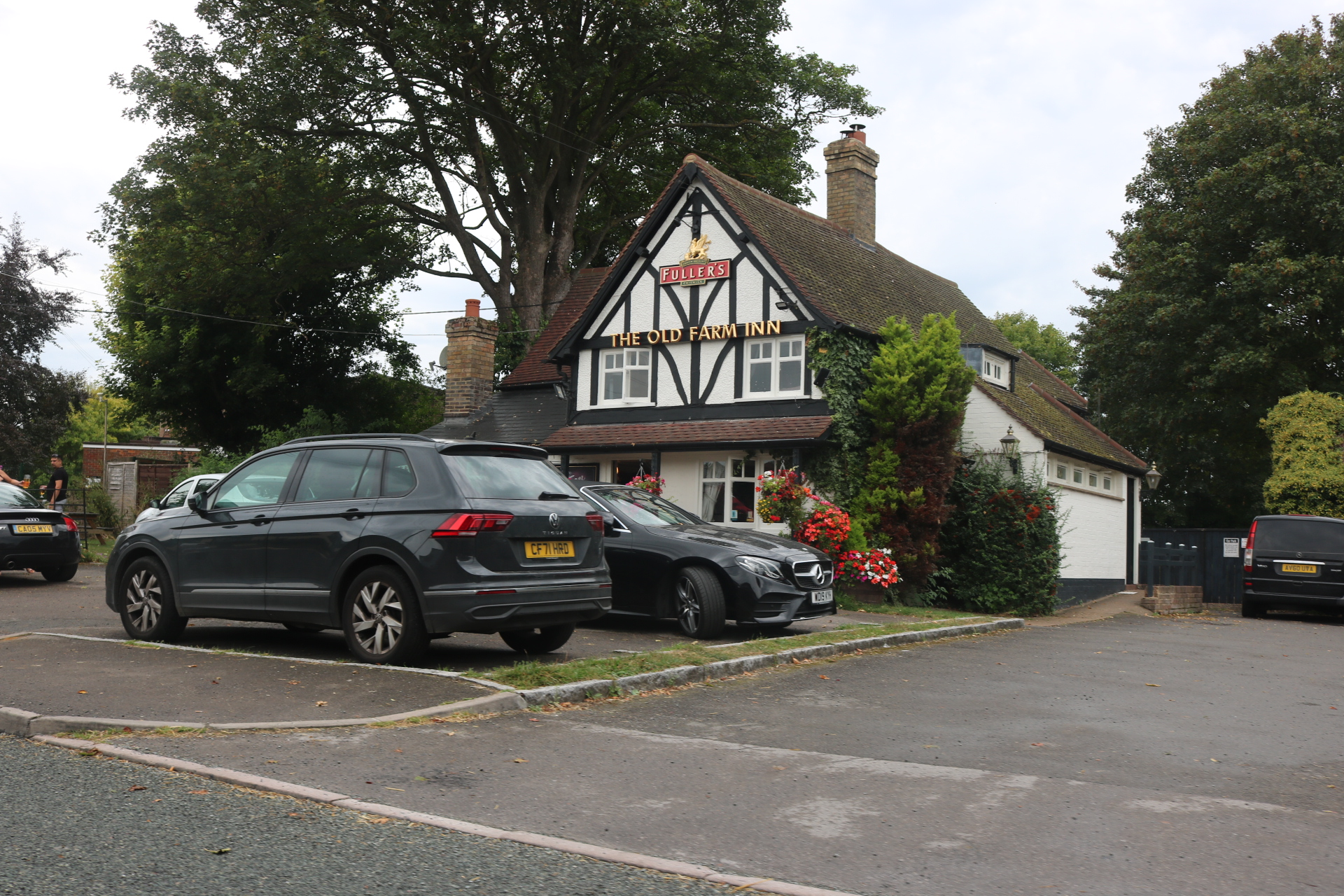
- The Old Farm Inn

- Location within Bedfordshire
- OS grid reference: SP992199
- Civil parish: Totternhoe
- Unitary authority: Central Bedfordshire
- Ceremonial county: Bedfordshire
- Region: East
- Country: England
- Sovereign state: United Kingdom
- Post town: DUNSTABLE
- Postcode district: LU6
- Dialling code: 01582
- Police: Bedfordshire
- Fire: Bedfordshire
- Ambulance: East of England
- UK Parliament: South West Bedfordshire

Church End is a hamlet located in Bedfordshire, England.

The settlement forms part of the wider Totternhoe village (where the 2011 Census population was included) and civil parish, with Church End being the closest part of the parish to the larger town of Dunstable. Totternhoe Lower School is located in Church End, as is "The Old Farm Inn" public house.
