= The Cross Keys, Totternhoe =

Pub in Totternhoe, Bedfordshire, England

Coordinates: 51°53′12″N 0°34′40″W

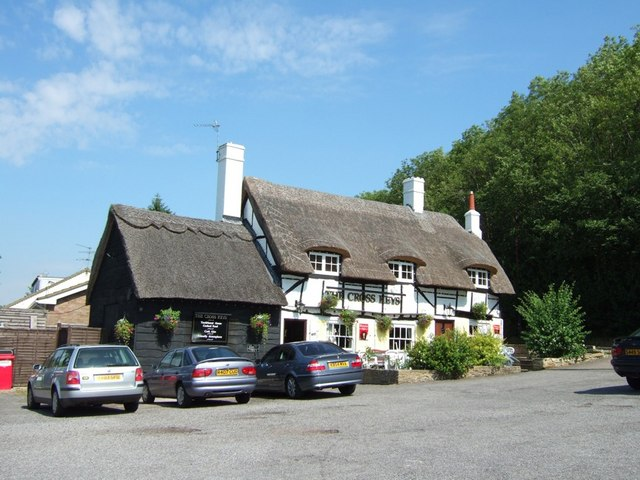
The Cross Keys, Totternhoe

The Cross Keys is a Grade II listed pub in Totternhoe, Bedfordshire, England It is a 17th-century thatched building and the first floor is timber-framed.

== Interior ==
The interior is largely unaltered since the 1930s, and is on CAMRA'S Regional Inventory of Historic Pub Interiors for East Anglia.
