= Totternhoe Stone Pit =

Protected area in Bedfordshire, England

Coordinates: 51.890191°N 0.576649°W

- Site of Special Scientific Interest
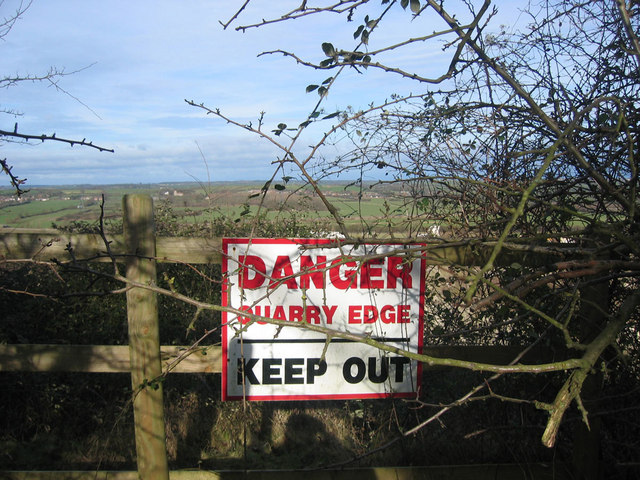
- Location of Totternhoe Stone Pit.
- Area of search: Bedfordshire
- Grid reference: SP982222
- Interest: Geological
- Area: 2.1 ha (5.2 acres)
- Notification date: 1996
- Location map: Magic Map

Totternhoe Stone Pit is a geological Site of Special Scientific Interest in Totternhoe in Bedfordshire, England. It is also a Geological Conservation Review site, and the local planning authority is Central Bedfordshire Council.

The site displays the base of the Totternhoe Stone. It is a lime mud with an extensive deposit of late Cretaceous shark teeth, some of species which have not been fully described. so it can be a resource for further research. The lower levels contain larger teeth and upper ones contain small rays.

The site is part of the Totternhoe nature reserve, managed by the Wildlife Trust for Bedfordshire, Cambridgeshire and Northamptonshire, but there is no public access to the Stone Pit.
