= Totternhoe Roman villa =

Roman villa in Bedfordshire, England

Coordinates: 51.877003°N 0.56428143°W

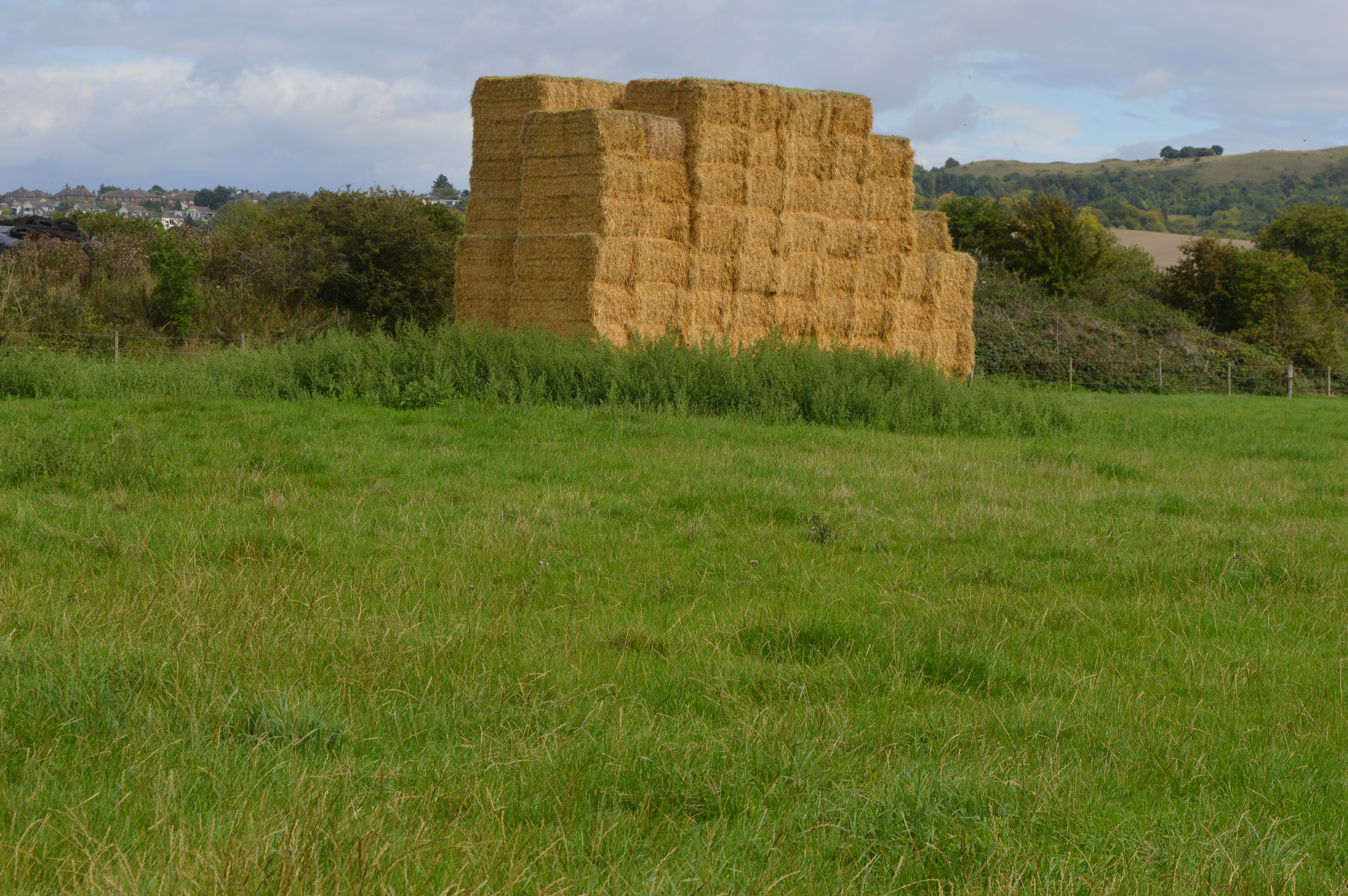
The site of the Roman villa has been filled in and grassed over

Totternhoe Roman villa is on Church Farm, Church Road, in Totternhoe, Bedfordshire, England. No sign of it is now visible, as it has been filled in and grassed over.

The villa was excavated by the Manshead Archaeological Society under the direction of C. L. Matthews in the 1950s. It was a Roman courtyard house, 200x240 feet, with at least 14 rooms, with mosaics, hypocausts and painted wall plaster. Pottery was mainly late 4th century, but there was also some from the 2nd century. 5-6th century Saxon potsherds were also found, suggesting occupation after the villa was abandoned. Finds from the site can be seen in the Roman gallery of Stockwood Discovery Centre.
