= Church of St Giles, Totternhoe =

Church in Totternhoe, Bedfordshire, England

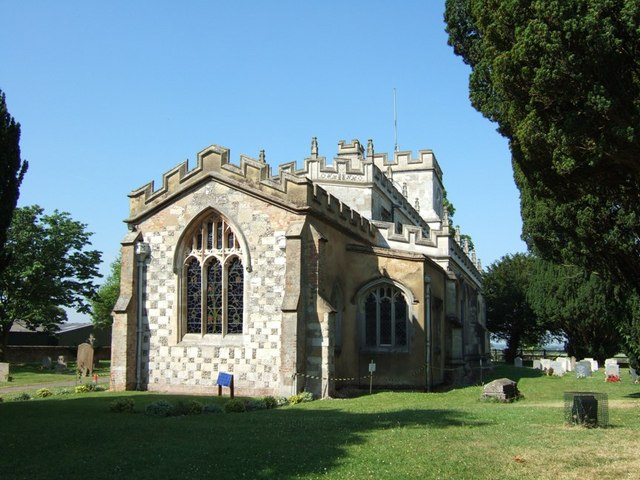
- Church of St Giles, Totternhoe
- 51.877797°N 0.565588°W
- Location: Totternhoe, Bedfordshire
- Country: England
- Denomination: Church of England
- Website: TST Benefice

History
- Dedication: St Giles

Architecture
- Heritage designation: Grade I listed
- Designated: 3 February 1967
- Style: Perpendicular Gothic

Administration
- Diocese: St Albans
- Archdeaconry: Bedford
- Deanery: Dunstable
- Parish: Totternhoe

The Church of St Giles is a Grade I listed Anglican church situated in the village of Totternhoe, Bedfordshire, England. Constructed primarily from locally sourced Totternhoe Stone, the church's architectural evolution spans from the 14th to the 16th century. It is known for its distinctive flint flushwork decoration and striking 20th-century stained glass window designed by John Piper and crafted by Patrick Reyntiens.

== History ==
A place of worship has existed in Totternhoe since at least the 12th century. The present structure began with the construction of the chancel in the 14th century. The nave and aisles were added in the late 15th century, and the west tower was completed around 1550, funded by the will of William Ashwell, a local benefactor.

The church underwent significant restoration in the 19th century, including the re-tiling of floors and repairs to the roofs and windows. The tower was also restored during this period.

== Architecture ==
=== Materials ===
The church is predominantly constructed from Totternhoe Stone, a local clunch that is easy to work but prone to weathering. This material is complemented by flint, particularly evident in the chequerboard pattern on the east end of the chancel, a characteristic feature of the region.

=== Exterior ===
The chancel, dating from the 14th century, is the oldest part of the church. The nave and aisles, built in the late Perpendicular Gothic style, feature battlemented walls and four-bay arcades. The west tower, erected around 1550, is a prominent feature of the church's exterior.

=== Interior ===
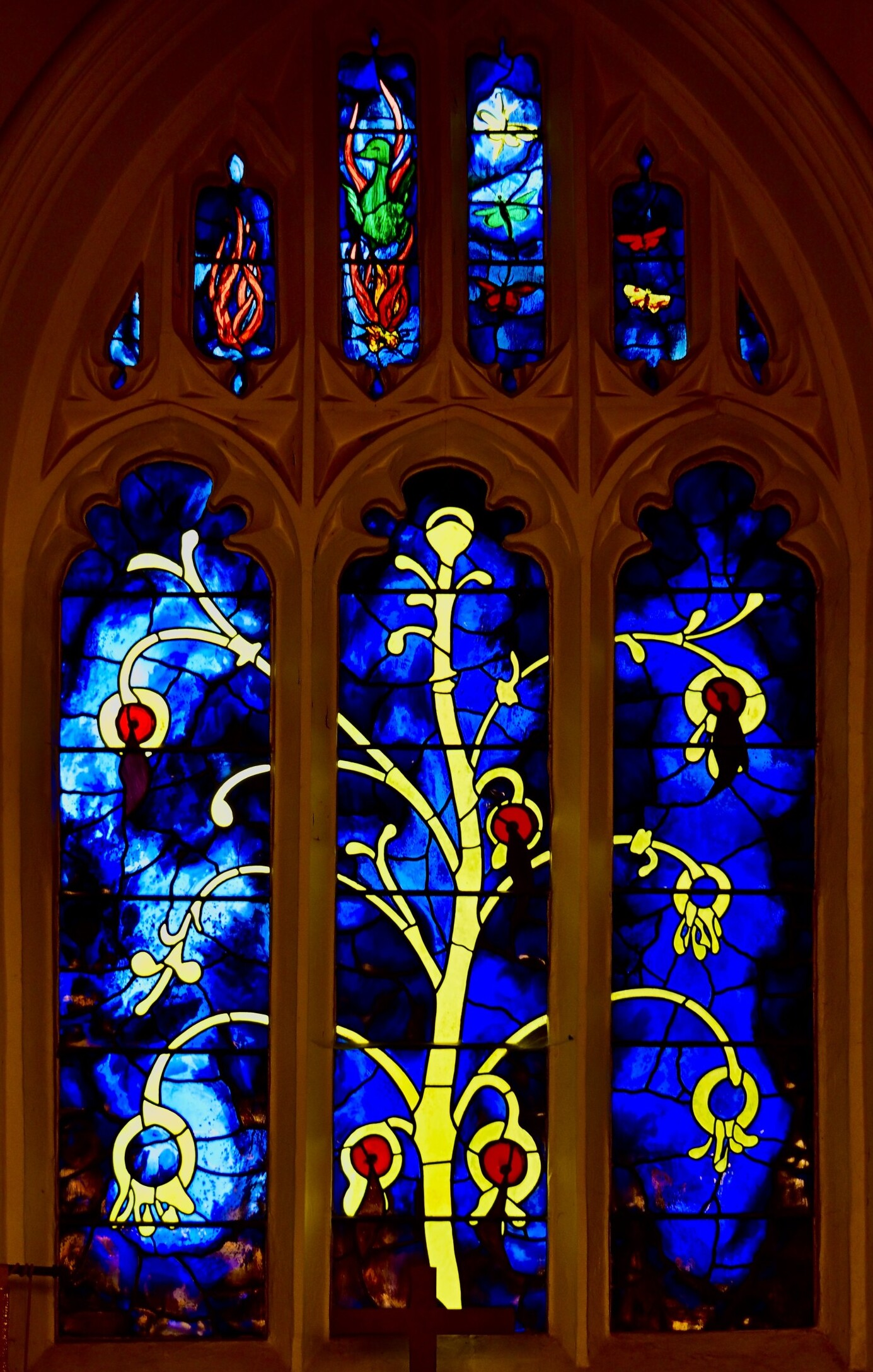
Tree of Life window in east chancel

Inside, the church retains its original timbered roofs with carved beams and bosses. The rood screen, dating from the 15th century, has been restored but remains a significant feature of the interior. The font, also from the Perpendicular period, dates to around 1500.

A highlight of the church is the Tree of Life window in the east chancel, designed by John Piper and made by Patrick Reyntiens in 1970–71, serving as a modern contrast to the medieval stonework. The tree is depicted in yellow on a deep blue background across all three main lights. Red pomegranates hang from the branches, a symbol of eternal life. The tracery depicts symbols of the Resurrection; fire, the Phoenix and butterflies.

The west tower houses a ring of eight bells. The oldest bell dates from 1625, with others recast in the 18th and 20th centuries. The most recent major work on the bells occurred in 1979.
