= Totternhoe Castle =

Motte-and-bailey castle in Bedfordshire, England

- Bedfordshire, England
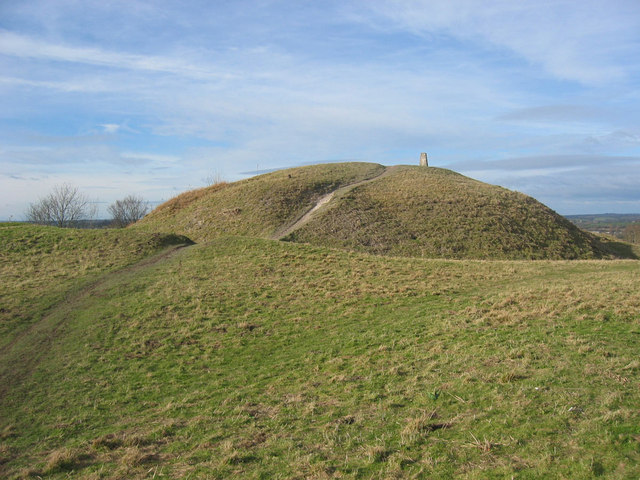
- Remaining earthworks

Site information
- Type: Motte-and-bailey
- Condition: Earthworks

Location
- Shown within Bedfordshire
- Coordinates: 51.8889°N 0.5803°W
- Grid reference: grid reference SP978221

Totternhoe Castle is a Norman castle in Totternhoe, Bedfordshire. Only earthworks survive. It is a Scheduled Monument, and part of Totternhoe Knolls Site of Special Scientific Interest.

== Details ==
Totternhoe Castle overlooks the village of Totternhoe in Bedfordshire, near the town of Dunstable. Built during the Norman period, probably during the years of the Anarchy, it is of a motte-and-bailey design, with two baileys rather than the more usual one. A wide ditch protects three sides of the castle, with the fourth protected by the edge of the chalk hill on which the castle is situated.

== See also ==
- Castles in Great Britain and Ireland
- List of castles in England

== Bibliography ==
- Fry, Plantagenet Somerset. (2008) Castles. London: David and Charles. ISBN 978-0-7153-2692-3.
- Pettifer, Adrian. (2002) English Castles: a Guide by Counties. Woodbridge, UK: Boydell Press. ISBN 978-0-85115-782-5.
