= Thomas Baillie & Co. =

English glassmaking firm

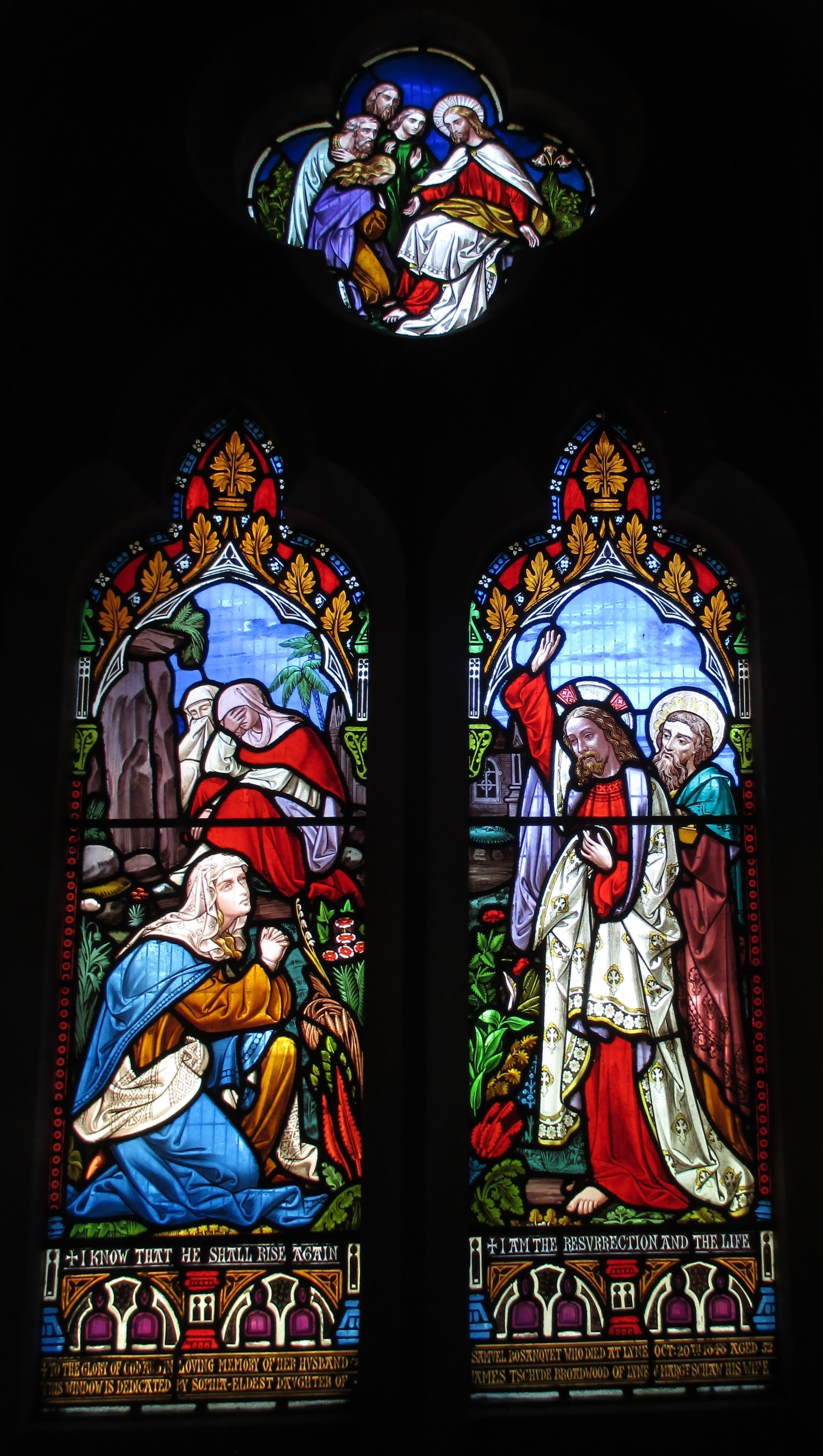
Jesus at the home of Martha and Mary (1855), a Baillie window in St Mary Magdalene's Church, Rusper, West Sussex

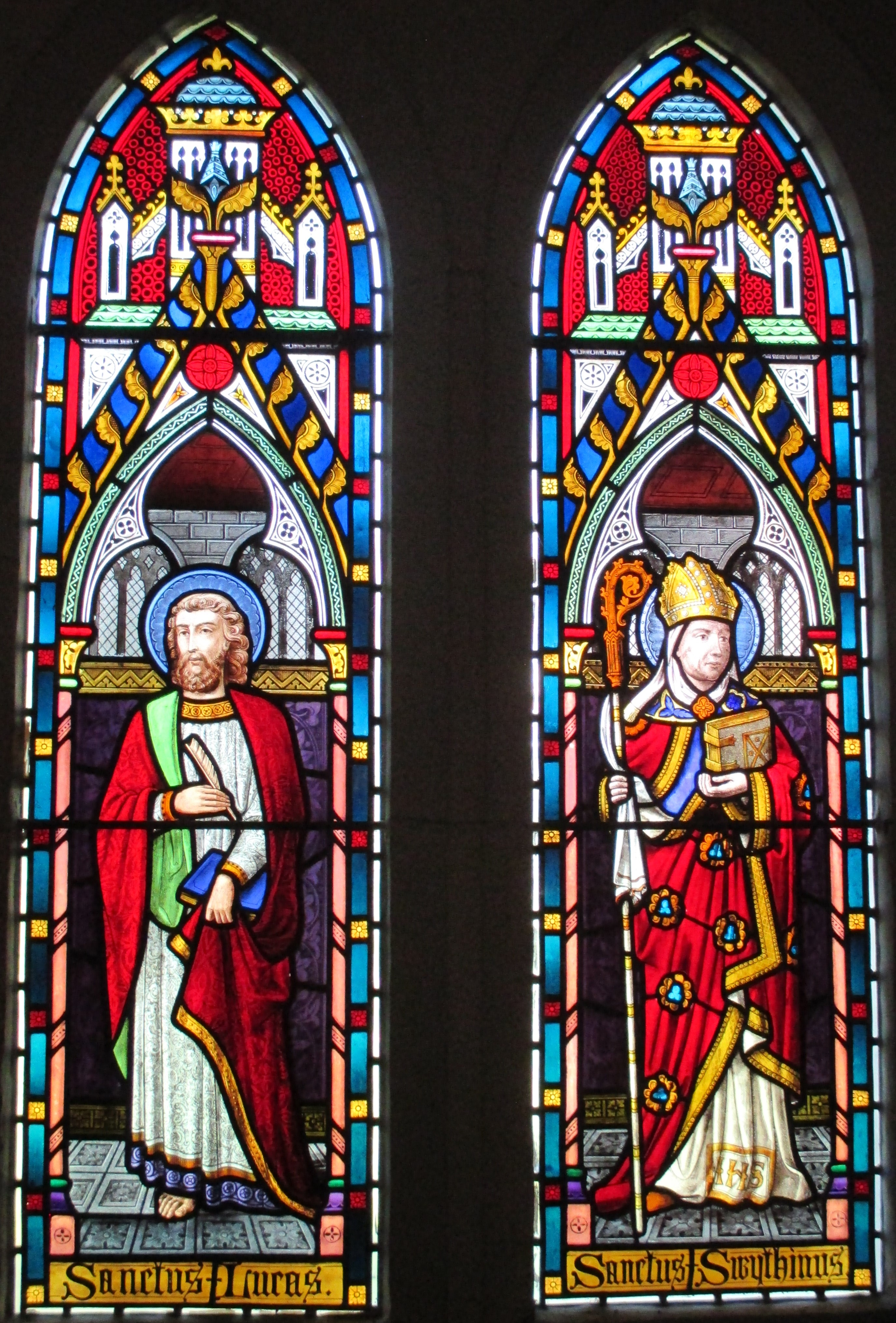
St Luke and St Swithun (1872), a Baillie window in St Andrew's Church, Nuthurst, West Sussex

Thomas Baillie & Co. was a family firm of stained-glass designers who traded at various times under that name or as Edward Baillie, Baillie & Mayer, and Baillie and Lutwyche. It was founded by Alexander Benjamin Baillie in 1832 and was continued first by his sons Edward and Thomas, by George Mayer, and finally by William Lutwyche. There is no evidence of its existence after the late 1890s. A very successful firm in its heyday, producing brightly-coloured stained glass for English cathedrals and for churches around the world, its productions receive a mixed press from modern critics.

== History ==
The Scotsman Alexander Benjamin Baillie (1787–1864), founder of the family firm, is said to have played some part in stained glass production as early as the 1810s, before he moved to London. The firm was established there in 1832, occupying at first premises in Cumberland Market, though by 1850 they had opened a branch in Wardour Street which was to eventually become their sole address. By 1845 Alexander Baillie's elder son Edward (1812–1856) was conducting the business along with, or in succession to, his father, and in 1851 Edward exhibited stained glass in the Crystal Palace at the Great Exhibition, implying that the firm had made something of a name for itself. Edward brought his younger brother Thomas (1815–1883) into the business in 1853, and the following year they took into partnership George Mayer, a freelance watercolourist and glass painter whose work had also appeared at the Great Exhibition.

Edward Baillie died comparatively young in 1856, but Baillie & Mayer, as the firm was now known, prospered, recording in 1861 that they were employing 20 men and 5 boys. Through their more successful years they executed stained-glass windows at such high-profile locations as Westminster Abbey (the memorial window to Geoffrey Chaucer in Poets' Corner); Peterborough Cathedral; Strawberry Hill; Wimborne Minster; St John's College, Cambridge; New College, Oxford; St Giles in the Fields, London; Dobroyd Castle; Wroxall Priory; and St Peter and St Paul's Church, Sheffield (now Sheffield Cathedral). They also restored fragments of medieval glass at Winchester Cathedral. Commissions came in from as far afield as the United States, India, Australia, New Zealand, Malta, and the West Indies.

The firm manufactured windows designed by the young Charles Eamer Kempe in the late 1860s and the fledgling company of Shrigley and Hunt in the mid 1870s, but both withdrew to set up their own workshops so as to produce glass to their own high standards. The name of the company is last recorded in the form Baillie & Mayer in 1879, though in some earlier records it appears as Thomas Baillie & Co., the form in which it eventually settled. In 1874 Thomas Baillie erected a window commemorating his parents in Lyminster Priory, near Arundel, which has been taken as evidence that the Baillie family by then had some connection with Sussex. Very few Baillie windows are known of a later date than this, but the company did continue in existence even after Thomas's death in 1883. The decorator William Lutwyche, who had previously been taken into partnership, traded indifferently as Thomas Baillie & Co. or as Baillie and Lutwyche, perhaps by this time as a stained-glass manufacturer more than as a stained-glass designer. The firm's last known entry in a Kelly's Directory dates from 1897.

== Style and reception ==
In the late 1840s and 1850s the company produced windows in the highly-coloured and pictorial style favoured by the previous generation of stained glass artists. To cite two windows of theirs from that period as examples, one has been described as "a Raphaelesque composition...of Christ taking leave of his Mother, in a C16 Italian landscape", and the other as "sentimental and painterly". The colours in two more are characterised as "bright" and even "rather garish". The architectural historian John Allen writes of Thomas Baillie as a man of more advanced tastes, but critics nevertheless describe individual windows from the 1860s as being "dramatically composed [with] rich colours" and even "shockingly coloured". The phrase "old fashioned" is sometimes used with reference to glass from their last phase. Evaluation of Baillie windows in the Buildings of England series varies. One in St Margaret's Church, Buxted, East Sussex is said to be "of no merit", and another, in Michaelchurch Court, Michaelchurch Escley, Herefordshire, "pretty", while the East window of St Bartholomew's Church, Cranmore, Somerset, a "lurid Crucifixion", is recommended as worth seeking out for its "glass at the limits of good taste".
