= St Matthew's Church, Willesden =

Coordinates: 51.5417°N 0.2489°W

St Matthew's Church
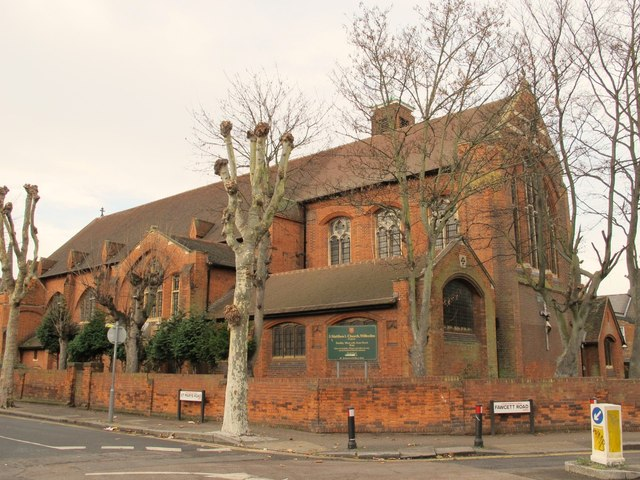

- Location within the borough of Brent
- OS grid reference: TQ 21534 83990
- Location: Willesden, London
- Country: England
- Denomination: Anglican
- Churchmanship: Traditional Catholic

History
- Status: Active
- Founded: 1894
- Dedication: Saint Matthew

Architecture
- Functional status: Parish church
- Heritage designation: Grade II listed
- Designated: 3 June 1992
- Architect: William Douglas Caroe
- Style: Gothic Revival
- Groundbreaking: 3 November 1900
- Completed: 11 October 1906

Administration
- Province: Canterbury
- Diocese: London
- Archdeaconry: Northolt
- Deanery: Brent

Clergy
- Bishop: Rt Revd Jonathan Baker (AEO)
- Vicar: The Revd Ross Brooks SSC

St Matthew's Church is an Anglican parish church in Willesden in the London Borough of Brent. It is situated on the corner of St Mary's Road and Fawcett Road in Willesden. It was built between 1900 and 1906, designed by W. D. Caröe and is a Grade II listed building. It is in the deanery of Brent, in the archdeaconry of Northolt, in the Diocese of London.

== History ==
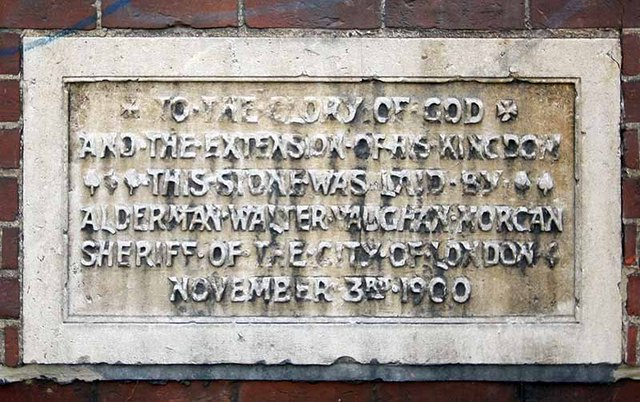
Foundation Stone

=== Foundation ===
St Matthew's was founded in 1894 by London Diocesan Home Mission, when it bought a site at the lower end of St Mary's Road. Construction on a temporary iron structure started on 1 December 1894. The church, finished in 1895, could accommodate a congregation of 300 people.

=== Construction ===
Work on the permanent church, made out of brick, started on 3 November 1900 when the foundation stone was laid in a dedication ceremony celebrated by the Archdeacon of Middlesex. The church was designed by the architect William Douglas Caröe, and the first portion of the church was consecrated for use on 12 October 1901 by the Bishop of London, Arthur Winnington-Ingram.

The church was completed in sections, with the first part completed in 1901. The vestries and northeast corner were finished on 25 February 1904, the organ was installed on 27 January 1906 and the nave was completed on 11 October 1906 and consecrated two days later. The capacity of the completed church was 878.

=== Parish hall ===
The parish hall was built from 17 July 1910 to 6 January 1911. During the First World War it was used as a makeshift hospital and held 40 beds.

It was bombed during the Second World War on 28 September 1940, which claimed the lives of seven people who were sheltering in it. It was derelict until 1951 when it was rebuilt.

== Parish ==
The local school, John Keble Church of England Primary School, has a close relationship with the church. Responsibility for the school is shared between the parish and All Souls' Church in Harlesden.

Services are conducted every week in the church. The list of weekly services is as follows:

Sunday - Solemn Mass at 11am;

Monday - Low Mass at 10am;

Tuesday - Low Mass at 10am;

Wednesday - Low Mass at 7.30pm;

Thursday - Low Mass at 12noon;

Friday - Low Mass at 10am.

== Interior ==
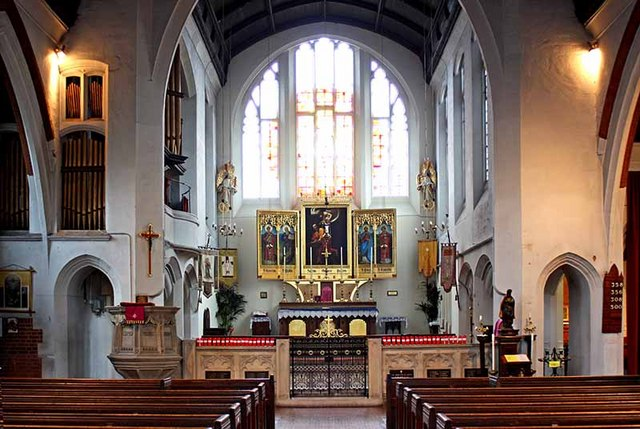
Chancel

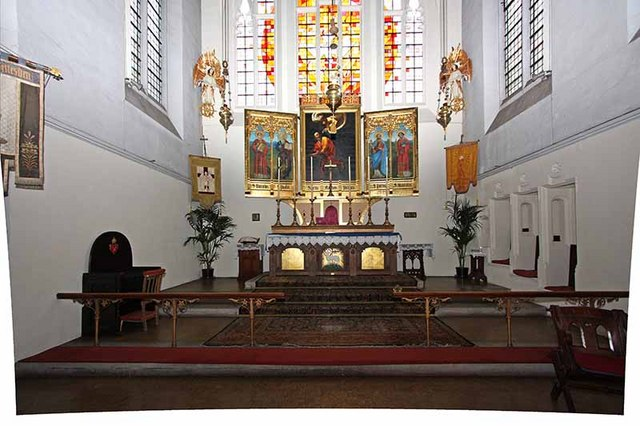
Sanctuary

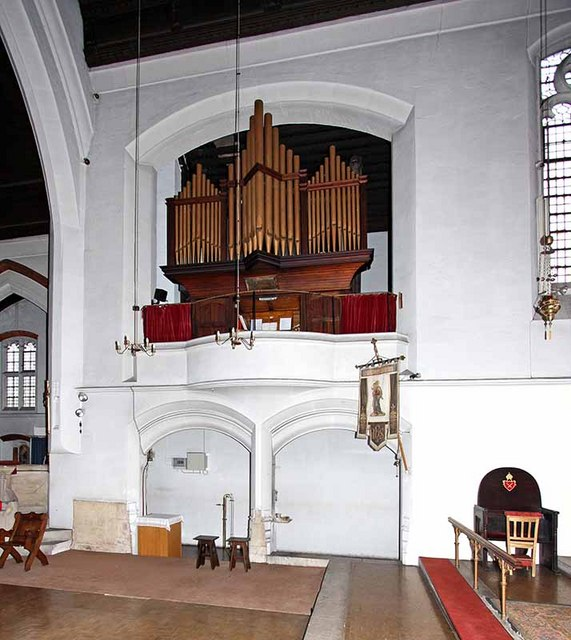
Organ

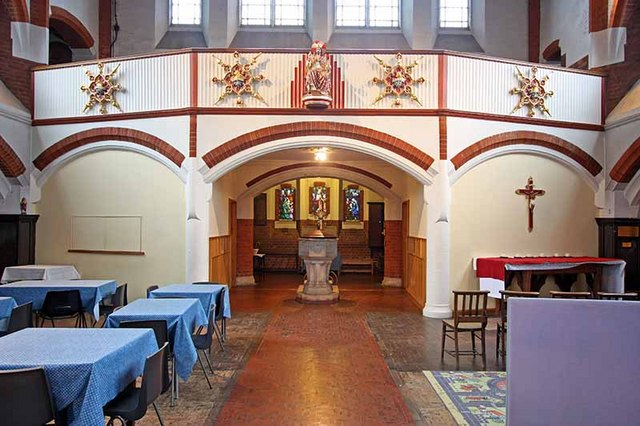
Gallery

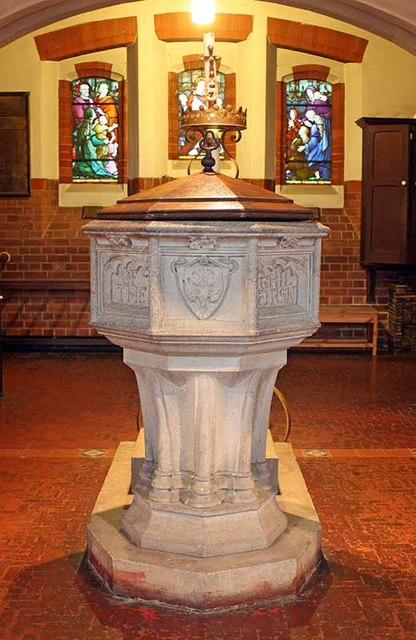
Baptismal font

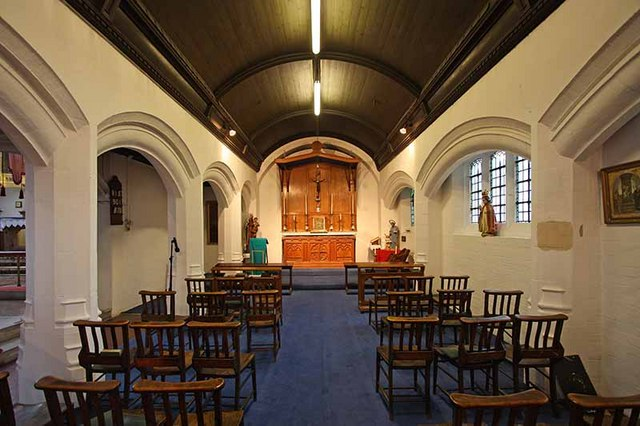
South chapel

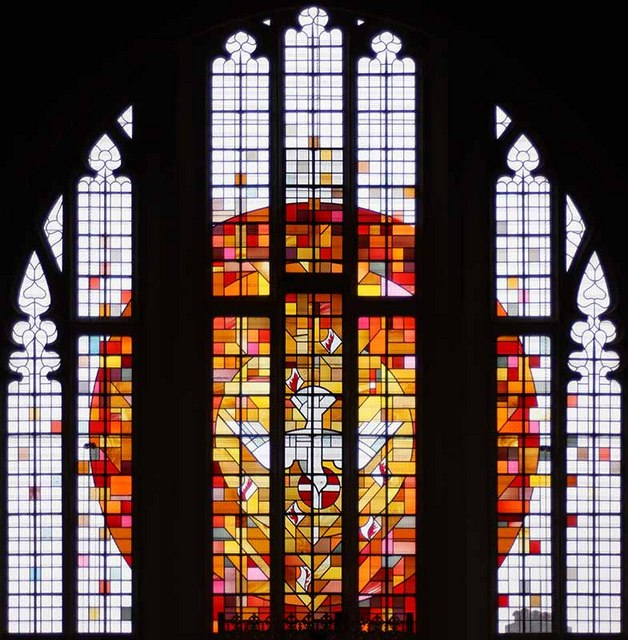
East window

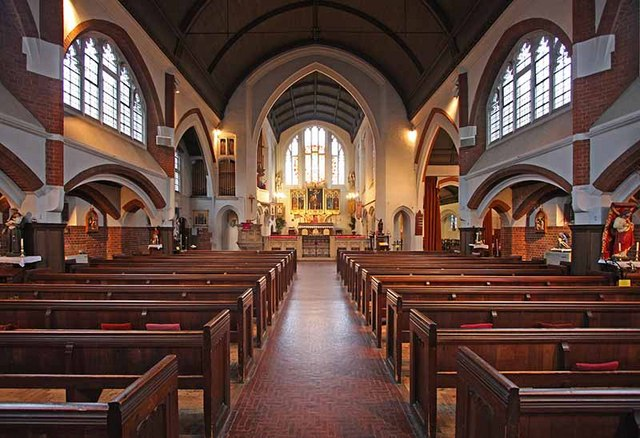
Nave

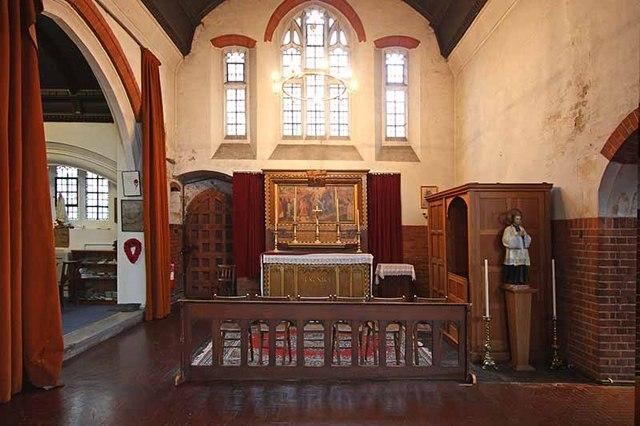
Side altar

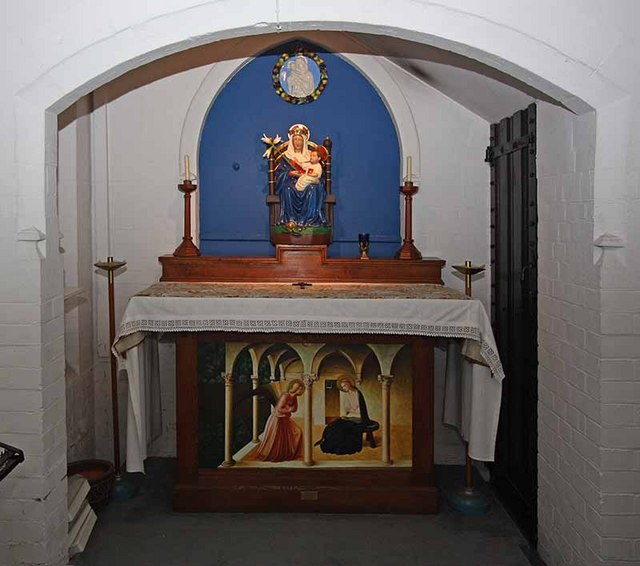
Shrine of Our Lady of Walsingham

== See also ==
- Willesden
