= Totternhoe Stone =

Hard chalk outcropping in England

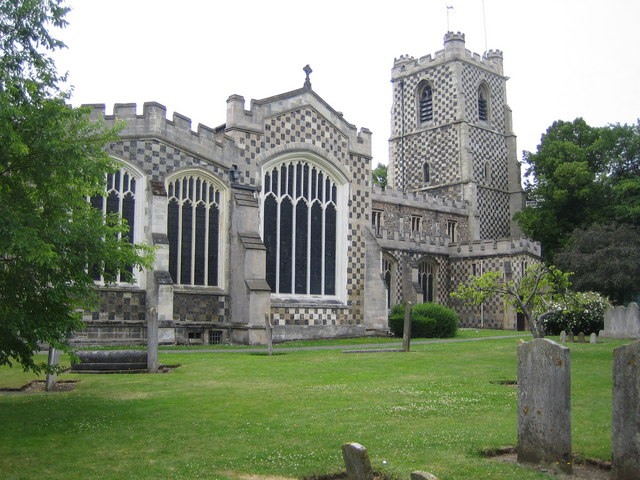
The characteristic checkerboard design of many Bedfordshire churches built with alternating chalk and flint blocks: St Mary's (Luton).

Totternhoe Stone, also known as Totternhoe Clunch, is a relatively hard chalk outcropping in the middle of the Lower Chalk in the Chiltern Hills in Hertfordshire, Buckinghamshire, Bedfordshire and Cambridgeshire, England. Geologically, it is located in the upper part of the Cenomanian stage of the Cretaceous.

Unusually among chalks, it is sufficiently strong for use as a building stone, and has been used as such in these localities, notably in Woburn Abbey, Luton parish church and several smaller local churches, including the Church of St Giles in Totternhoe, the village after which the stone is named. It weathers rather badly in external use, but when used as internal carved decoration, it has remained in good condition for centuries. Old decorative carving is to be found in St Albans Abbey and in the altar screen of Westminster Abbey.

The Totternhoe Stone is underlain by the argillaceous Chalk Marl. Above is the less argillaceous Grey Chalk. The bed varies in thickness from 0.5 to 5 metres. The stone, although fine-grained, is siliceous, and partial cementing with silica accounts for its relative hardness. It forms a distinct escarpment at several locations at the base of the Chiltern ridge, notably at Totternhoe, Bedfordshire 51.89°N 0.576°W, where it is at its thickest. In addition to use as a building stone, in the past it was used in the manufacture of a hydraulic lime, and in cement manufacture at three cement plants.

== Quarrying ==
The stone has been quarried north of Totternhoe village in the county of Bedfordshire.

It was quarried at Totternhoe Knolls, and to the east of the Knolls there were underground mines for the stone. The area from where the medieval tunnels were dug is now designated a Site of Special Scientific Interest (SSSI) called Totternhoe Chalk Quarry, as an example of chalk grassland. It is managed as a nature reserve by the Wildlife Trust for Bedfordshire, Cambridgeshire and Northamptonshire.

In recent times the stone has been quarried in an area between the Knolls and the mines. This has been designated an SSSI called Totternhoe Stone Pit, as a Geological Conservation Review site.

The Stone is quarried by a family-run business, H.G Clarke and Son. This was started in 1920 by Herbert G.Clarke. It was then passed to his son Stanley W.Clarke and is now being run by his son Angus J.Clarke. H.G Clarke and Son are the main suppliers of this rare English stone.
