= Totternhoe =

Village in Bedfordshire, England

Coordinates: 51.884°N 0.571°W

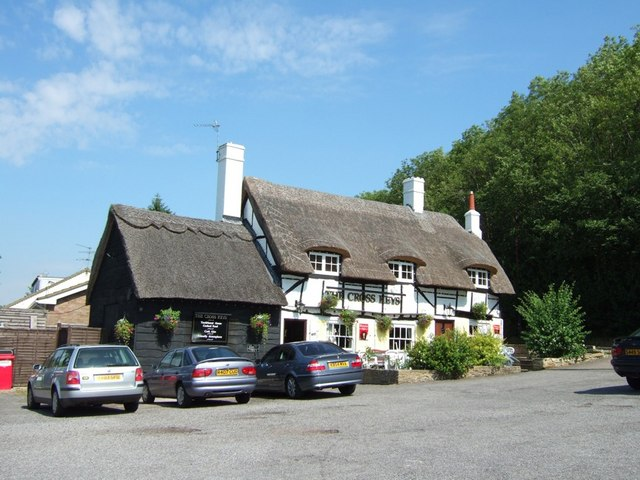
- The Cross Keys public house

- Location within Bedfordshire
- Population: 1,197 (parish)
- OS grid reference: SP985215
- Civil parish: Totternhoe
- Unitary authority: Central Bedfordshire
- Ceremonial county: Bedfordshire
- Region: East
- Country: England
- Sovereign state: United Kingdom
- Post town: Dunstable
- Postcode district: LU6
- Dialling code: 01582 (Church End); 01525 (Middle and Lower Ends)
- Police: Bedfordshire
- Fire: Bedfordshire
- Ambulance: East of England
- UK Parliament: South West Bedfordshire
- Website: Totternhoe Online

Totternhoe is a village and civil parish in the Manshead hundred of the county of Bedfordshire, England.

== Overview ==
Totternhoe is an ancient village in southern Bedfordshire, near Dunstable and Leighton Buzzard. Totternhoe Knolls has been a fort for many peoples including Romans and Normans. Totternhoe Castle, of motte-and-bailey design, was built during the Norman period, probably during the years of the Anarchy, only the mound survives. Behind the knoll is a large chalk quarry producing Totternhoe Stone and modern lime kilns.

The parish church of Saint Giles dates from the 13th century.

The parish had 553 homes housing 1,197 people at the time of the 2021 census.

There are several farms and a small lower school, Totternhoe Church of England Academy.

The village has two public houses, The Old Farm Inn in Church End and The Cross Keys in Middle End. Another pub in Church End, The Bell, was converted into a private home in about 1992.

== Geography ==
The village is long and thin and is separated into three parts:

- Church End, closest to Dunstable, includes the school and a pub. This area of the village centres around the junction of three of the four main roads into the village: Church Road (leading to Eaton Bray), Dunstable Road and Castle Hill Road (leading to Leighton Buzzard). Dunstable Road becomes Castle Hill Road as one heads West.
- Middle End has a recreation ground and a Scout Hut (where the First Totternhoe Scouts and Guides meet) next to where the old school used to be. One entrance to the Knolls is up past the Scout Hut.
- Lower End, towards Leighton Buzzard, is where the quarry is. It is overlooked by the old fort on the Knoll.

The civil parish includes the foot of Dunstable Downs, including the London Gliding Club.

== History ==
Totternhoe Roman villa dates to the fourth century.

The Domesday Book of 1086 recorded the village as Totene Hou, meaning "look out house" and "spur", presumably describing forts on the Knoll.

The 1881 Census recorded Totternhoe's population as about 700, of whom 54% were female.

Totternhoe's common lands were not enclosed until 1892.

== Sport and leisure ==
Totternhoe has a Non-League football team Totternhoe F.C. who play at Church End recreation ground.

== Notable buildings and sites ==
Travelling west from Dunstable one may find the following buildings.

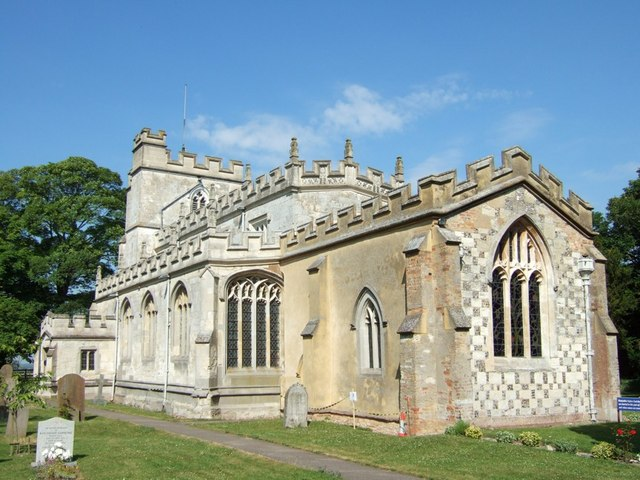
St Giles's Church

- Lancot Park, the Dunstable Cricket Club ground, built on farmland in the 1990s.
- Totternhoe Football Club's building in the corner of the Church End recreation ground
- The Old Farm Inn, an old thatched and timber-framed pub dating from the 17th century
- The Cross Keys Pub, a thatched building, twice damaged by fire in the 1970s and early 2000s
- Lockington Farm
- The current school
- The former Bell pub
- St Giles' parish church. The church was built using stone from local quarries and has a fine exterior. "Flint-flushwork" decoration is used in the gable of the nave. Building began in the 14th century and was not completed until the 16th.
- Glebelands, St Giles church house, a former retirement home and now a private home
- The site of the old school in Middle End
- The scout hut
- The old village shop, now a private home
- The first village Post Office, now a private home
- Totternhoe Memorial Hall, the village's war memorial
- Poplar Farm
- The former Methodist Chapel, now a private home
- The second village shop and later Post Office, now a private home
- Totternhoe Lime & Stone Co and the old quarry

== Adjacent towns and villages ==
The village shares boundaries with the following parishes:

- Dunstable
- Sewell
- Eaton Bray
- Tilsworth
