= Luton power station =

Former power station

- Country: England
- Location: Luton
- Coordinates: 51°52′45″N 00°24′34″W
- Status: Decommissioned and demolished
- Construction began: 1898
- Commission date: 1901
- Decommission date: 1969
- Owners: Luton Corporation (1895–1948); British Electricity Authority (1948–1955); Central Electricity Authority (1955–1957); Central Electricity Generating Board (1958–1969)
- Operator: As owner

Thermal power station
- Primary fuel: Coal
- Secondary fuel: Fuel oil
- Turbine technology: Steam turbines
- Cooling towers: 2
- Cooling source: Cooling towers

Power generation
- Units operational: 1 x 5 MW, 1 x 7 MW, 1 x 11 MW
- Make and model: Brush-Ljungstrom turbo-alternator
- Nameplate capacity: 23 MW
- Annual net output: 30,831 MWh (1946)

Luton power station supplied electricity to the Borough of Luton and the surrounding area from 1901 to 1969. The power station was operated by the Luton Corporation until the nationalisation of the British electricity industry in 1948. It was redeveloped after the First World War to meet the increased demand for electricity.

== History ==
Luton Corporation obtained a provisional order in 1895 under the Electric Lighting Acts to generate and supply electricity to Borough of Luton. The Luton Corporation Electric Lighting Order 1895 was granted by the Board of Trade and was confirmed by Parliament through the Electric Lighting Orders Confirmation (No. 2) Act 1895 (58 & 59 Vict. c. lxvii). The corporation built a power station in St Mary's Road, Luton (51°52′45″N 00°24′34″W) which was commissioned in 1901.

Luton power station supplied electricity to Luton Corporation Tramways from the opening of the system in 1908 until its closure in 1932.

The British electricity supply industry was nationalised in 1948 under the provisions of the Electricity Act 1947 (10 & 11 Geo. 6. c. 54). The Luton electricity undertaking was abolished, ownership of Luton power station was vested in the British Electricity Authority, and subsequently the Central Electricity Authority and the Central Electricity Generating Board (CEGB). At the same time the electricity distribution and sales responsibilities of the Luton electricity undertaking were transferred to the Eastern Electricity Board (EEB).

Luton power station was closed in 1969. The power station was demolished in 1972.

In 2026, ground broke on the Power Court Stadium project that will become the home ground for Luton Town ahead of the 2028–29 season, replacing Kenilworth Road, the club's home since 1905.

== Equipment specification ==
=== Plant in 1901 ===
At opening it was equipped with two Tinkers Lancashire boilers feeding three W H Allen steam sets supplying 85kW each.

=== Plant in 1923 ===
By 1923 the plant comprised boilers delivering 166,000 lb/h (20.9 kg/s) of steam to:

- 1 × 350 kW reciprocating engine driving direct current (DC) generator
- 2 × 500 kW reciprocating engines DC generators
- 1 × 400 kW steam turbine DC generator
- 1 × 650 kW steam turbine DC generator
- 2 × 1,000 kW steam turbo-alternators, alternating current (AC)
- 1 × 3,000 kW steam turbo-alternator AC

These machines had a total generating capacity of 7,400 kW; comprising 2,400 kW DC and 5,000 kW AC.

Electricity supply to consumers was at 250 and 500 V DC.

=== Plant in 1954 ===
By 1954 the plant comprised:

- Boilers:
  - 2 × Woodeson 90,000 lb/h (11.34 kg/s) pulverised fuel boilers, steam conditions were 325 psi and 700 °F (22.4 bar and 371 °C), steam was supplied to:
- Generators:
  - 1 × 5 MW Brush-Ljungstrom 6.6 kV turbo-alternator
  - 1 × 7 MW Brush-Ljungstrom 6.6 kV turbo-alternator
  - 1 × 11 MW Brush-Ljungstrom 6.6 kV turbo-alternator

The total generating capacity was 23 MW and the output capacity was 13 MW.

Condenser water was cooled in two Mouchel reinforced concrete cooling towers each with a capacity of 1.0 million gallons per hour (4,546 m^{3}/hour).

The boilers were converted to oil firing in 1965.

== Operations ==
=== Operating data 1921–23 ===
The electricity supply data for the period 1921–23 was:

Luton power station supply data 1921–23
Electricity Use	Units	Year		
Electricity Use	Units	1921	1922	1923
Lighting and domestic	MWh	2,223	2,350	3,076
Public lighting	MWh	5	10	14
Traction	MWh	366	300	326
Power	MWh	8,014	6,283	8,224
Bulk supply	MWh	0	0	656
Total use	MWh	10,608	8,943	12,197

The electricity Loads on the system were:

Year		1921	1922	1923
Maximum load	kW	6,315	5,646	6,300
Total connections	kW	16,080	16,500	17,337
Load factor	Per cent	21.6	20.5	26.9

Revenue from the sale of current (in 1923) was £75,852; the surplus of revenue over expenses was £33,664.

=== Operating data 1946 ===
In 1946 Luton power station supplied 30,831 MWh of electricity; the maximum output load was 18,390 kW; the load factor was 49.5 per cent; the thermal efficiency was 14.60 per cent.

=== Operating data 1954–67 ===
Operating data for the period 1954–67 was:

Luton power station operating data, 1954–67
Year	Running hours (or load factor %)	Max output capacity, MW	Electricity supplied, MWh	Thermal efficiency per cent
1954	1787	20	18,455	13.51
1955	2326	20	21,219	13.36
1956	2617	20	24,669	13.42
1957	2065	18	18,207	12.78
1958	2440	18	24,451	12.95
1961	5.6 %	13	6,373	13.82
1962	11.5 %	13	13,140	14.13
1963	12.13 %	13	13,809	13.50
1964	3.52 %	13	4,019	14.33
1965	17.6 %	13	21,585	15.88
1967	9.2 %	14	11,224	13.09

Output of the station in MWh

== Luton Electricity District ==
Following nationalisation in 1948 Luton power station became part of the Luton electricity supply district, covering 200 square miles (518 km^{2}) with a population of 193,800 in 1958.

The number of consumers and electricity sold in the Luton district was:

Year	1956	1957	1958
Number of consumers	61,172	53,551	63,949
Electricity sold MWh	458,223	492,340	567,425

In 1958 the number of units sold to categories of consumers was:

Type of consumer	No. of consumers	Electricity sold MWh
Domestic	59,164	113,972
Commercial	4,164	31,828
Combined premises	1,582	8,207
Industrial	1,382	404,930
Farms	781	6,181
Public lighting	17	2,307
Total	67,090	567,425

== See also ==
- Timeline of the UK electricity supply industry
- List of power stations in England
