= Walthamstow Power Station =

Walthamstow power station
- Country: England
- Location: Borough of Walthamstow
- Coordinates: 51°34′55″N 0°01′23″W
- Status: Decommissioned, demolished
- Commission date: 1901
- Owner: Borough of Walthamstow
- Operator: As owner

Thermal power station
- Primary fuel: Coal
- Turbine technology: Steam raising, steam turbines and reciprocating engines
- Chimneys: 3
- Cooling towers: 5
- Cooling source: Cooling towers

Power generation
- Nameplate capacity: See tables

Walthamstow Power Station supplied electricity to the Borough of Walthamstow London from 1901 until 1968.

== History ==
Authorisation for an electricity generation and supply system for the Borough of Walthamstow was granted in the Walthamstow Electric Lighting Order 1895, confirmed by the Electric Lighting Orders Confirmation (No. 3) Act 1895 (58 & 59 Vict. c. lxviii). However, no work was undertaken until 1900.

The station began to supply electricity on 20 September 1901 to the Municipal Borough of Walthamstow. The power station in Exeter Street had three brick chimneys and an array of wooden cooling towers.

In 1923 the revenue to the borough from sales of electricity was £109,909. Upon nationalisation of the electricity industry in 1948 ownership of the station passed to the British Electricity Authority and later to the Central Electricity Authority then to the Central Electricity Generating Board (CEGB).

== Electricity generation ==
The generating plant and operating data for the power station plant at selected years is summarised in the following table.

Walthamstow power station: plant and operating data
Year	1922	1937	1947	1950	1958
Steam raising, lb/hr	170,000	242,000	242,000	250,000	220,000
Turbo-alternators, MW	2 × 0.6 2 × 1.5 1 × 3.30 2 × 0.3 note 1 × 1.0 DC	2 × 1.75 1 × 3.5 1 × 5.5 1 × 7.0 1 × 1.0 DC		2 × 1.75 1 × 3.5 1 × 5.5 1 × 7.0	2 × 1.75 1 × 3.5 1 × 5.5 1 × 7.0
Maximum load, kW	5,509	21,550	33,960	13,000	13,000
Total connections, kW	14,616	81,039			
Electricity generated, MWh	14,396	65,980	16,110		
Electricity purchased, MWh	Nil	68,400	124,184		
Electricity sold, MWh	11,604	62,370	108,276	11,426	3,585
Gross surplus, £	44,574	90,237	49,497		
Number of consumers		32,843	35,142		

Note. Reciprocating engine, DC supply.

There were five wooden type cooling towers with a total combined cooling capacity of 1.115 million gallons per hour (5069 m^{3}/hr).

The generating capacity of Walthamstow power station and the electricity generated over selected years of its operational life was as follows.

Walthamstow power station, capacity and output
Year	Generating capacity, MW	Electricity generated, GWh
1913	–	5.44
1923	14.1	17.72
1936	20.5	3.64
1946	15.2	16.59
1947	15.0	18.26
1948	13	19.26
1950	13	11.43
1954	13	6.958
1955	13	3.53
1956	13	2.89
1957	13	1.01
1958	13	3.58
1961	19.5	2.39
1964	19.5	3.41
1966	19.5	7.06
1967	19.5	7.34

== Closure ==
The CEGB closed the station in March 1968 when the thermal efficiency had fallen to 9.30 per cent. It was subsequently demolished, apart from a small number of buildings which are retained as Exeter Street substation and Walthamstow tee point, operated by UK Power Networks.
