= List of acts of the Parliament of the United Kingdom from 1895 =

This is a complete list of acts of the Parliament of the United Kingdom for the year 1895.

Note that the first parliament of the United Kingdom was held in 1801; parliaments between 1707 and 1800 were either parliaments of Great Britain or of Ireland). For acts passed up until 1707, see the list of acts of the Parliament of England and the list of acts of the Parliament of Scotland. For acts passed from 1707 to 1800, see the list of acts of the Parliament of Great Britain. See also the list of acts of the Parliament of Ireland.

For acts of the devolved parliaments and assemblies in the United Kingdom, see the list of acts of the Scottish Parliament, the list of acts of the Northern Ireland Assembly, and the list of acts and measures of Senedd Cymru; see also the list of acts of the Parliament of Northern Ireland.

The number shown after each act's title is its chapter number. Acts passed before 1963 are cited using this number, preceded by the year(s) of the reign during which the relevant parliamentary session was held; thus the Union with Ireland Act 1800 is cited as "39 & 40 Geo. 3 c. 67", meaning the 67th act passed during the session that started in the 39th year of the reign of George III and which finished in the 40th year of that reign. Note that the modern convention is to use Arabic numerals in citations (thus "41 Geo. 3" rather than "41 Geo. III"). Acts of the last session of the Parliament of Great Britain and the first session of the Parliament of the United Kingdom are both cited as "41 Geo. 3". Acts passed from 1963 onwards are simply cited by calendar year and chapter number.

All modern acts have a short title, e.g. the Local Government Act 2003. Some earlier acts also have a short title given to them by later acts, such as by the Short Titles Act 1896.

== 58 & 59 Vict. ==
The fourth session of the 25th Parliament of the United Kingdom, which met from 5 February 1895 until 6 July 1895.

No private acts were passed during this session.

=== Public general acts ===
Short title	Citation	Royal assent
Long title
Local Government (Scotland) Act 1894 Amendment Act 1895 (repealed)	58 & 59 Vict. c. 1	14 March 1895
An Act to amend and explain the Local Government (Scotland) Act, 1894. (Note: Local Government (Scotland) Act 1894 (57 & 58 Vict. c. 58)) (Repealed by Local Government (Scotland) Act 1947 (10 & 11 Geo. 6. c. 43))
Seed Potatoes Supply (Ireland) Act 1895 (repealed)	58 & 59 Vict. c. 2	14 March 1895
An Act to provide for the Supply of Seed Potatoes to Occupiers and Cultivators of Land in Ireland. (Repealed by Statute Law Revision Act 1908 (8 Edw. 7. c. 49))
Australian Colonies Duties Act 1895 (repealed)	58 & 59 Vict. c. 3	28 March 1895
An Act to amend the Law with respect to Customs Duties in the Australian Colonies. (Repealed by Statute Law (Repeals) Act 1973 (c. 39))
Consolidated Fund (No. 1) Act 1895 (repealed)	58 & 59 Vict. c. 4	28 March 1895
An Act to apply certain sums out of the Consolidated Fund to the service of the years ending on the thirty first day of March one thousand eight hundred and ninety-four, one thousand eight hundred and ninety five, and one thousand eight hundred and ninety-six. (Repealed by Statute Law Revision Act 1908 (8 Edw. 7. c. 49))
Shop Hours Act 1895 (repealed)	58 & 59 Vict. c. 5	9 April 1895
An Act to amend the Shop Hours Act, 1892. (Note: Shop Hours Act 1892 (55 & 56 Vict. c. 62)) (Repealed by Shops Act 1912 (2 & 3 Geo. 5. c. 3))
Convention of Royal Burghs (Scotland) Act 1879 Amendment Act 1895 (repealed)	58 & 59 Vict. c. 6	9 April 1895
An Act to amend the Convention of Royal Burghs (Scotland) Act, 1879. (Note: Convention of Royal Burghs (Scotland) Act 1879 (42 & 43 Vict. c. 27)) (Repealed by Local Government (Scotland) Act 1973 (c. 65))
Army (Annual) Act 1895 (repealed)	58 & 59 Vict. c. 7	9 April 1895
An Act to provide, during twelve months, for the Discipline and Regulation of the Army. (Repealed by Statute Law Revision Act 1908 (8 Edw. 7. c. 49), Statute Law Revision Act 1950 (14 Geo. 6. c. 6), Statute Law Revision Act 1953 (2 & 3 Eliz. 2. c. 5) and Revision of the Army and Air Force Acts (Transitional Provisions) Act 1955 (3 & 4 Eliz. 2. c. 20))
Grand Jury (Ireland) Act 1895 (repealed)	58 & 59 Vict. c. 8	14 May 1895
An Act to amend the Grand Jury (Ireland) Laws. (Repealed by Local Government (Ireland) Act 1898 (61 & 62 Vict. c. 37))
Documentary Evidence Act 1895	58 & 59 Vict. c. 9	14 May 1895
An Act to apply the Documentary Evidence Acts to the Board of Agriculture.
Mr. Speaker's Retirement Act 1895 (repealed)	58 & 59 Vict. c. 10	14 May 1895
An Act for settling and securing an Annuity upon the Right Honourable Arthur Wellesley Peel in consideration of his eminent Services. (Repealed by Statute Law (Repeals) Act 1971 (c. 52))
Lands Clauses (Taxation of Costs) Act 1895 (repealed)	58 & 59 Vict. c. 11	14 May 1895
An Act to amend the Law relating to the Taxation of Costs under the Lands Clauses Acts. (Repealed by Compulsory Purchase Act 1965 (c. 56))
Metropolitan Police (Receiver) Act 1895	58 & 59 Vict. c. 12	14 May 1895
An Act to make provision for the temporary absence of the Receiver for the Metropolitan Police District.
Cruelty to Animals (Scotland) Act 1895 (repealed)	58 & 59 Vict. c. 13	30 May 1895
An Act to amend the Cruelty to Animals (Scotland) Act, 1850. (Note: Cruelty to Animals (Scotland) Act 1850 (13 & 14 Vict. c. 92)) (Repealed by Protection of Animals (Scotland) Act 1912 (2 & 3 Geo. 5. c. 14))
Courts of Law Fees (Scotland) Act 1895	58 & 59 Vict. c. 14	30 May 1895
An Act to provide for the Regulation of Fees payable in the Courts of Law in Scotland.
Consolidated Fund (No. 2) Act 1895 (repealed)	58 & 59 Vict. c. 15	30 May 1895
An Act to apply a sum out of the Consolidated Fund to the service of the year ending on the thirty-first day of March one thousand eight hundred and ninety-six. (Repealed by Statute Law Revision Act 1908 (8 Edw. 7. c. 49))
Finance Act 1895	58 & 59 Vict. c. 16	30 May 1895
An Act to grant certain Duties of Customs and Inland Revenue, to repeal and alter other Duties, and to amend the Law relating to Customs and Inland Revenue and to make Provision for the Financial Arrangements of the Year.
Reformatory and Industrial Schools (Channel Islands Children) Act 1895 (repealed)	58 & 59 Vict. c. 17	20 June 1895
An Act for enabling Children to be sent from the Channel Islands to Reformatory or Industrial Schools in Great Britain. (Repealed by Children Act 1908 (8 Edw. 7. c. 67))
Post Office Amendment Act 1895 (repealed)	58 & 59 Vict. c. 18	27 June 1895
An Act to amend the Post Office Act, 1891. (Note: Post Office Act 1891 (54 & 55 Vict. c. 46)) (Repealed by Post Office Act 1908 (8 Edw. 7. c. 48))
Court of Session Consignations (Scotland) Act 1895	58 & 59 Vict. c. 19	27 June 1895
An Act to make provision in regard to the Consignation of Money in the Court of Session in Scotland; and for other purposes.
Tramways (Ireland) Act 1895 (repealed)	58 & 59 Vict. c. 20	27 June 1895
An Act to amend the Tramways and Public Companies (Ireland) Act, 1883. (Note: Tramways and Public Companies (Ireland) Act 1883 (46 & 47 Vict. c. 43)) (Repealed by Public Works &c Loans Act (Northern Ireland) 1953 (c. 13 (N.I.)))
Seal Fisheries (North Pacific) Act 1895 (repealed)	58 & 59 Vict. c. 21	27 June 1895
An Act to provide for prohibiting the Catching of Seals at certain periods in Behring Sea and other parts of the Pacific Ocean adjacent to Behring Sea, and for regulating the Seal Fisheries in those Seas. (Repealed by Marine and Coastal Access Act 2009 (c. 23))
Out-door Relief (Ireland) Act 1895 (repealed)	58 & 59 Vict. c. 22	6 July 1895
An Act to make temporary provision for the Relief of Distress in Ireland. (Repealed by Statute Law Revision Act 1908 (8 Edw. 7. c. 49))
Volunteer Act 1895 (repealed)	58 & 59 Vict. c. 23	6 July 1895
An Act to amend the Law as to the Calling out of Volunteers for actual Military Service. (Repealed by Volunteer Act 1900 (63 & 64 Vict. c. 39) and Statute Law Revision Act 1950 (14 Geo. 6. c. 6))
Law of Distress Amendment Act 1895	58 & 59 Vict. c. 24	6 July 1895
An Act to amend the Law of Distress Amendment Act, 1888. (Note: Law of Distress Amendment Act 1888 (51 & 52 Vict. c. 21))
Mortgagees Legal Costs Act 1895	58 & 59 Vict. c. 25	6 July 1895
An Act to amend the Law relating to the Costs allowed to Mortgagees. (Repealed for England and Wales by Solicitors Act 1932 (22 & 23 Geo. 5. c. 37))
Friendly Societies Act 1895 (repealed)	58 & 59 Vict. c. 26	6 July 1895
An Act to amend the Law relating to Friendly Societies. (Repealed by Friendly Societies Act 1896 (59 & 60 Vict. c. 25) and Collecting Societies and Industrial Assurance Companies Act 1896 (59 & 60 Vict. c. 26))
Market Gardeners' Compensation Act 1895 (repealed)	58 & 59 Vict. c. 27	6 July 1895
An Act to extend and amend the provisions of the Agricultural Holdings (England) Act, 1883, (Note: Agricultural Holdings (England) Act 1883 (46 & 47 Vict. c. 61)) so far as they relate to Market Gardens. (Repealed by Agricultural Holdings Act 1908 (8 Edw. 7. c. 28))
False Alarms of Fire Act 1895 (repealed)	58 & 59 Vict. c. 28	6 July 1895
An Act to prohibit the giving False Alarms of Fires. (Repealed for England and Wales and Scotland by Fire Services Act 1947 (10 & 11 Geo. 6. c. 41) and for Northern Ireland by Fire Services Act (Northern Ireland) 1947 (c. 10 (N.I.)))
Fisheries Close Season (Ireland) Act 1895 (repealed)	58 & 59 Vict. c. 29	6 July 1895
An Act to amend the Fisheries (Ireland) Acts, 1842 to 1891, by providing the right of appeal in certain cases. (Repealed by Fisheries (Ireland) Act 1909 (9 Edw. 7. c. 25))
Industrial and Provident Societies (Amendment) Act 1895 (repealed)	58 & 59 Vict. c. 30	6 July 1895
An Act to amend the Industrial and Provident Societies Act, 1893. (Note: Industrial and Provident Societies Act 1893 (56 & 57 Vict. c. 39)) (Repealed by Industrial and Provident Societies Act 1965 (c. 12))
Appropriation Act 1895 (repealed)	58 & 59 Vict. c. 31	6 July 1895
An Act to apply a sum out of the Consolidated Fund to the service of the year ending on the thirty-first day of March one thousand eight hundred and ninety-six, and to appropriate the Supplies granted in this Session of Parliament. (Repealed by Statute Law Revision Act 1908 (8 Edw. 7. c. 49))
Local Government (Stock Transfer) Act 1895 (repealed)	58 & 59 Vict. c. 32	6 July 1895
An Act to amend the Local Government Act, 1894, (Note: Local Government Act 1894 (56 & 57 Vict. c. 73)) so far as regards the transfer of any stock, share, or security standing in the name of, or dividends payable to, a local authority. (Repealed by Local Government Act 1933 (23 & 24 Geo. 5. c. 51) and London Government Act 1939 (2 & 3 Geo. 6. c. 40))
Extradition Act 1895 (repealed)	58 & 59 Vict. c. 33	6 July 1895
An Act to amend the Extradition Acts, 1870 (Note: Extradition Act 1870 (33 & 34 Vict. c. 52)) and 1873, (Note: Extradition Act 1873 (36 & 37 Vict. c. 60)) so far as respects the Magistrate by whom and the Place in which the Case may be heard and the Criminal held in Custody. (Repealed for the United Kingdom by Extradition Act 1989 (c. 33) and for the Isle of Man by Statute Law (Repeals) Act 2004 (c. 14))
Colonial Boundaries Act 1895	58 & 59 Vict. c. 34	6 July 1895
An Act to provide in certain Cases for the Alteration of the Boundaries of Colonies.
Naval Works Act 1895 (repealed)	58 & 59 Vict. c. 35	6 July 1895
An Act to make provision for the Construction of Works in the United Kingdom and elsewhere for the purpose of the Royal Navy, and to amend the Law relating to the Acquisition of Land for Naval Purposes. (Repealed by Defence (Transfer of Functions) (No. 1) Order 1964 (SI 1964/488))
Fatal Accidents Inquiry (Scotland) Act 1895 (repealed)	58 & 59 Vict. c. 36	6 July 1895
An Act to make provision for Public Inquiry in regard to Fatal Accidents occurring in Industrial Employments or Occupations in Scotland. (Repealed by Fatal Accidents and Sudden Deaths Inquiry (Scotland) Act 1976 (c. 14))
Factory and Workshop Act 1895 (repealed)	58 & 59 Vict. c. 37	6 July 1895
An Act to amend and extend the Law relating to Factories and Workshops. (Repealed by Factory and Workshop Act 1901 (1 Edw. 7. c. 22) and Statute Law Revision Act 1950 (14 Geo. 6. c. 6))
Isle of Man (Customs) Act 1895 (repealed)	58 & 59 Vict. c. 38	6 July 1895
An Act to amend the Law respecting the Customs Duties in the Isle of Man. (Repealed by Isle of Man (Customs) Act 1933 (23 & 24 Geo. 5. c. 40))
Summary Jurisdiction (Married Women) Act 1895 (repealed)	58 & 59 Vict. c. 39	6 July 1895
An Act to amend the Law relating to the Summary Jurisdiction of Magistrates in reference to Married Women. (Repealed by Matrimonial Proceedings (Magistrates' Courts) Act 1960 (8 & 9 Eliz. 2. c. 48))
Corrupt and Illegal Practices Prevention Act 1895 (repealed)	58 & 59 Vict. c. 40	6 July 1895
An Act to amend the Corrupt and Illegal Practices Prevention Act, 1883. (Note: Corrupt and Illegal Practices Prevention Act 1883 (46 & 47 Vict. c. 51)) (Repealed for England and Wales and Scotland by Representation of the People Act 1949 (12, 13 & 14 Geo. 6. c. 68) and for Northern Ireland by Electoral Law Act (Northern Ireland) 1962 (c. 14 (N.I.)))
Lands Valuation (Scotland) Amendment Act 1895 (repealed)	58 & 59 Vict. c. 41	6 July 1895
An Act to amend the Valuation of Lands (Scotland) Acts. (Repealed by Valuation and Rating (Scotland) Act 1956 (4 & 5 Eliz. 2. c. 60))
Sea Fisheries Regulation (Scotland) Act 1895 (repealed)	58 & 59 Vict. c. 42	6 July 1895
An Act for the better Regulation of Scottish Sea Fisheries. (Repealed by Inshore Fishing (Scotland) Act 1984 (c. 26))
Naturalization Act 1895 (repealed)	58 & 59 Vict. c. 43	6 July 1895
An Act to amend the Naturalization Act, 1870, (Note: Naturalization Act 1870 (33 & 34 Vict. c. 14)) so far as respects Children of Naturalized British Subjects in the service of the Crown resident out of the United Kingdom. (Repealed by British Nationality and Status of Aliens Act 1914 (4 & 5 Geo. 5. c. 17))
Judicial Committee Amendment Act 1895	58 & 59 Vict. c. 44	6 July 1895
An Act to amend the Law relating to the Judicial Committee of Her Majesty’s Privy Council.

=== Local acts ===
Short title	Citation	Royal assent
Long title
Local Government Board (Ireland) Provisional Order Confirmation (No. 1) Act 1895	58 & 59 Vict. c. i	9 April 1895
An Act to confirm a Provisional Order made by the Local Government Board for Ireland under the Public Health (Ireland) Act 1878 (Note: Public Health (Ireland) Act 1878 (41 & 42 Vict. c. 52)) relating to the Town of Newry.
	Newry Town Provisional Order 1895 Town of Newry. Provisional Order.	
Agricultural Company of Mauritius Act 1895	58 & 59 Vict. c. ii	9 April 1895
An Act for enabling the Agricultural Company of Mauritius Limited to sub-divide their Capital into Preference and Ordinary Capital and for other purposes.
Credit Foncier of Mauritius Limited Act 1895 (repealed)	58 & 59 Vict. c. iii	9 April 1895
An Act for creating a Preference Stock of the Credit Foncier of Mauritius Limited and for other purposes relating thereto. (Repealed by Credit Foncier of Mauritius Act 1912 (2 & 3 Geo. 5. c. v))
William Hancock Company (Conversion of Shares) Act 1895	58 & 59 Vict. c. iv	9 April 1895
An Act to provide for the conversion of the Ordinary Shares of William Hancock and Company Limited into Preferred and Deferred Ordinary Shares and for other purposes.
London (Boundary Street, Bethnal Green) Provisional Order Confirmation Act 1895	58 & 59 Vict. c. v	14 May 1895
An Act to confirm a Provisional Order made by One of Her Majesty's Principal Secretaries of State for modifying the London (Boundary Street Bethnal Green) Improvement Scheme 1890.
	Provisional Order modifying the London (Boundary Street Bethnal Green) Improvement Scheme 1890.	
Metropolitan Outer Circle Railway (Abandonment) Act 1895 (repealed)	58 & 59 Vict. c. vi	14 May 1895
An Act for the Abandonment of the Metropolitan Outer Circle Railway. (Repealed by Statute Law (Repeals) Act 2013 (c. 2))
Newmarket Gas Company's Act 1895	58 & 59 Vict. c. vii	14 May 1895
An Act for incorporating and conferring Powers on the Newmarket Gas Company.
Bristol Waterworks Act 1895	58 & 59 Vict. c. viii	14 May 1895
An Act for the granting of further powers to the Bristol Waterworks Company and for other purposes.
Brecon and Merthyr Railway Act 1895	58 & 59 Vict. c. ix	14 May 1895
An Act for empowering the Brecon and Merthyr Tydfil Junction Railway Company to raise further money and for other purposes.
Legal and General Life Assurance Society's Act 1895 (repealed)	58 & 59 Vict. c. x	14 May 1895
An Act to extend the objects of the Legal and General Life Assurance Society and for other purposes. (Repealed by Legal and General Assurance Society's Act 1919 (9 & 10 Geo. 5. c. xx))
New Russia Company Act 1895	58 & 59 Vict. c. xi	14 May 1895
An Act to alter the Capital of the New Russia Company Limited and for other purposes.
Edinburgh Merchant Company Endowments Act 1895 (repealed)	58 & 59 Vict. c. xii	14 May 1895
An Act to provide for the better administration of the Merchant Company Hospitals and Schools in the City of Edinburgh to constitute a General Board to create a Common Fund a Superannuation Fund and a Reserve Fund to confer further powers of administration and for other purposes. (Repealed by Edinburgh Merchant Company Endowments Order Confirmation Act 1909 (9 Edw. 7. c. cxi))
Felixstowe and Walton Waterworks Act 1895	58 & 59 Vict. c. xiii	14 May 1895
An Act to incorporate and confer powers on the Felixstowe and Walton Waterworks Company.
St. Leonard and St. Mary Magdalen Church Districts Amendment Act 1895	58 & 59 Vict. c. xiv	14 May 1895
An Act to amend the Saint Leonard and Saint Mary Magdalen Church Districts Act 1868. (Note: St. Leonard and St. Mary Magdalen Church Districts Act 1868 (31 & 32 Vict. c. cxlvi))
Crystal Palace Company's Act 1895 (repealed)	58 & 59 Vict. c. xv	14 May 1895
An Act to make further provision with respect to the Capital of the Crystal Palace Company. (Repealed by London County Council (Crystal Palace) Act 1951 (14 & 15 Geo. 6. c. xxviii))
George Heriot's Trust Act 1895	58 & 59 Vict. c. xvi	14 May 1895
An Act to authorise the Governors of George Heriot's Trust to construct New Streets and Works in the City of Edinburgh and Burgh of Leith to alter certain Feuing Plans and for other purposes.
Wrexham and Ellesmere Railway Act 1895	58 & 59 Vict. c. xvii	14 May 1895
An Act to confer further powers upon the Wrexham and Ellesmere Railway Company and for other purposes.
British Gas Light Company (Staffordshire Potteries) Act 1895	58 & 59 Vict. c. xviii	14 May 1895
An Act for empowering the British Gas Light Company Limited to expend further Capital at their Staffordshire Potteries Station.
City and South London Railway Act 1895	58 & 59 Vict. c. xix	14 May 1895
An Act to further extend the Time for the purchase of Lands for the purposes of the City and South London Railway Act 1890 (Note: City and South London Railway Act 1890 (53 & 54 Vict. c. cxiv)) and for the completion of the Underground Railway thereby authorised and to empower the Company to raise additional Capital and for other purposes.
East Indian Railway Company's Act 1895 (repealed)	58 & 59 Vict. c. xx	14 May 1895
An Act to confer further powers on the East Indian Railway Company of entering into contracts for the construction and working of extension or branch lines and for other purposes. (Repealed by Statute Law (Repeals) Act 2013 (c. 2))
North Staffordshire Railway Act 1895	58 & 59 Vict. c. xxi	14 May 1895
An Act to confer further powers on the North Staffordshire Railway Company.
American Mortgage Company of Scotland Act 1895	58 & 59 Vict. c. xxii	14 May 1895
An Act for creating a preference Stock of the American Mortgage Company of Scotland Limited and for other purposes relating thereto.
Great Southern and Western Railway Act 1895	58 & 59 Vict. c. xxiii	14 May 1895
An Act for conferring further Powers upon the Great Southern and Western Railway Company to provide for the transfer from the Commissioners of Public Works in Ireland to and the vesting in that Company of the Clara and Banagher Railway and for other purposes.
Local Government Board (Ireland) Provisional Order Confirmation (No. 2) Act 1895	58 & 59 Vict. c. xxiv	14 May 1895
An Act to confirm a Provisional Order made by the Local Government Board for Ireland under the Public Health (Ireland) Act 1878 relating to the Rural Sanitary District of Dunmanway.
	Dunmanway Waterworks Provisional Order 1895 Dunmanway Waterworks. Provisional Order.	
Military Lands Provisional Orders Confirmation Act 1895 (repealed)	58 & 59 Vict. c. xxv	30 May 1895
An Act to confirm certain Provisional Orders of the Secretary of State under the Military Lands Act 1892. (Note: Military Lands Act 1892 (55 & 56 Vict. c. 43)) (Repealed by Statute Law (Repeals) Act 2008 (c. 12))
	Portobello Barracks Enlargement Order 1895 (No. 1) A Provisional Order made in pursuance of Section Two of the Military Lands Act 1892 authorising the purchase of land for the enlargement of the Portobello Barracks in the county of Dublin.	
	Portobello Barracks Enlargement Order 1895 (No. 2) A Provisional Order made in pursuance of Section Two of the Military Lands Act 1892 authorising the purchase of land for the enlargement of the Portobello Barracks in the county of Dublin.	
	Londonderry (Ebrington) Barracks Enlargement Order 1895 A Provisional Order made in pursuance of Section Two of the Military Lands Act 1892 authorising the purchase of land for the enlargement of the Ebrington Barracks in the city of Londonderry.	
Great Eastern Railway (General Powers) Act 1895	58 & 59 Vict. c. xxvi	30 May 1895
An Act for conferring further powers upon the Great Eastern Railway Company for extending the periods limited for the completion of certain works and the compulsory purchase of certain lands and for other purposes.
Edinburgh and District Waterworks (Additional Supply) Act 1895 (repealed)	58 & 59 Vict. c. xxvii	30 May 1895
An Act to provide an additional supply of Water to the City of Edinburgh Town and Port of Leith and Town of Portobello and districts and places adjacent to confer further powers on the Edinburgh and District Water Trustees and for other purposes. (Repealed by Edinburgh Corporation Order Confirmation Act 1958 (7 & 8 Eliz. 2. c. v))
Fishguard and Rosslare Railways and Harbours (Steam Vessels) Act 1895	58 & 59 Vict. c. xxviii	30 May 1895
An Act for empowering the Fishguard and Rosslare Railways and Harbours Company to provide and use steam and other vessels and for other purposes.
North Middlesex Gas Company's Act 1895	58 & 59 Vict. c. xxix	30 May 1895
An Act for incorporating and conferring powers on the North Middlesex Gas Company.
Ayr Faculty of Solicitors Widows' Fund Society Act 1895 (repealed)	58 & 59 Vict. c. xxx	30 May 1895
An Act to provide for the winding up and dissolution of the Widows' Fund Society of the Ayr Faculty of Solicitors and for other purposes. (Repealed by Statute Law (Repeals) Act 1998 (c. 43))
Hayward's Heath Gas Act 1895	58 & 59 Vict. c. xxxi	30 May 1895
An Act for Incorporating and Conferring Powers on the Hayward's Heath Gas Company.
London Street Tramways Act 1895	58 & 59 Vict. c. xxxii	30 May 1895
An Act to confer further powers upon the London Street Tramways Company and for other purposes.
Aire and Calder Navigation Act 1895	58 & 59 Vict. c. xxxiii	30 May 1895
An Act to define the Capital of the Undertakers of the Navigation of the Rivers of Aire and Calder in the West Riding of the County of York to make provision for the optional conversion into personalty of the shares and interests of Proprietors in the Navigation to confer further powers on the Undertakers for the construction of Works and other matters in relation to their Undertaking and for other purposes.
Hebden Bridge and Mytholmroyd Gas Board Act 1895 (repealed)	58 & 59 Vict. c. xxxiv	30 May 1895
An Act to constitute and incorporate a Gas Board for the Urban Districts of Hebden Bridge and Mytholmroyd in the West Riding of the County of York to transfer to and vest in such Board the Undertaking of the Hebden Bridge Gas Company and for other purposes. (Repealed by West Yorkshire Act 1980 (c. xiv))
Rhymney Railway Act 1895	58 & 59 Vict. c. xxxv	30 May 1895
An Act to authorise the Rhymney Railway Company to make a new Railway to raise additional Capital to revive and extend the time for purchasing Lands for and constructing certain authorised Railways to abandon other Railways to make provisions as to the Stock and Share Capital of the Company and for other purposes.
Great Northern Railway Act 1895	58 & 59 Vict. c. xxxvi	30 May 1895
An Act to confer further powers upon the Great Northern Railway Company and to vest in that Company the undertakings of the Wainfleet and Firsby Railway Company and for other purposes.
Whitby Water Act 1895	58 & 59 Vict. c. xxxvii	30 May 1895
An Act to sanction certain Works constructed by and Expenditure of the Whitby Waterworks Company to make void a certain Deed of Grant to confer further Powers on the Company and for other purposes.
Scarborough Gas Act 1895 (repealed)	58 & 59 Vict. c. xxxviii	30 May 1895
An Act to confer further powers on the Scarborough Gas Company. (Repealed by Scarborough Gas (Consolidation) Act 1927 (17 & 18 Geo. 5. c. xcv))
York Waterworks Act 1895	58 & 59 Vict. c. xxxix	30 May 1895
An Act for empowering the York New Waterworks Company to raise additional Capital for altering the name of the Company to extend their limits of supply and for other purposes.
Local Government Board's Provisional Orders Confirmation (No. 1) Act 1895	58 & 59 Vict. c. xl	20 June 1895
An Act to confirm certain Provisional Orders of the Local Government Board relating to Battle Dorchester Eton Fareham Ilfracombe Leicester Ryde Sandgate Southampton Torquay Ulverston Wallasey West Cowes and Wilton.
	Battle, &c. Order 1895 Provisional Order for partially repealing certain Confirming Acts.	
	Leicester Order 1895 Provisional Order for altering the Leicester Cattle Market Town Hall and Improvement Act 1866. (Note: Leicester Cattle Market, Town Hall and Improvement Act 1866 (29 & 30 Vict. c. xxvi))	
	Ulverston Order 1895 Provisional Order for altering a Local Act (Note: Ulverston Local Board Act 1874 (37 & 38 Vict. c. cliv)) and a Confirming Act. (Note: Local Government Board's Provisional Orders Confirmation (No. 5) Act 1885 (48 & 49 Vict. c. lxii))	
	Wallasey Order 1895 Provisional Order for altering a Confirming Act. (Note: Local Government Board's Provisional Orders Confirmation (No. 7) Act 1883 (46 & 47 Vict. c. cxxxvii))	
Local Government Board's Provisional Orders Confirmation (No. 2) Act 1895	58 & 59 Vict. c. xli	20 June 1895
An Act to confirm certain Provisional Orders of the Local Government Board relating to Batley Dronfield Hemsworth Pontefract Sunbury-on-Thames Tonbridge Twickenham Walthamstow and Warrington.
	Batley Order 1895 Provisional Order to enable the Urban District Council for the Borough of Batley to put in force the Compulsory Clauses of the Lands Clauses Acts.	
	Dronfield Order 1895 Provisional Order to enable the Urban District Council of Dronfield to put in force the Compulsory Clauses of the Lands Clauses Acts.	
	Hemsworth Rural Order 1895 Provisional Order to enable the Rural District Council of Hemsworth to put in force the Compulsory Clauses of the Lands Clauses Acts.	
	Pontefract Rural Order 1895 Provisional Order to enable the Rural District Council of Pontefract to put in force the Compulsory Clauses of the Lands Clauses Acts.	
	Sunbury-on-Thames Order 1895 Provisional Order to enable the Urban District Council of Sunbury-on-Thames to put in force the Compulsory Clauses of the Lands Clauses Acts.	
	Tonbridge Order 1895 Provisional Order to enable the Urban District Council of Tonbridge to put in force the Compulsory Clauses of the Lands Clauses Acts.	
	Twickenham Order 1895 Provisional Order to enable the Urban District Council of Twickenham to put in force the Compulsory Clauses of the Lands Clauses Acts.	
	Walthamstow Order 1895 Provisional Order to enable the Urban District Council of Walthamstow to put in force the Compulsory Clauses of the Lands Clauses Acts.	
	Warrington Order 1895 Provisional Order to enable the Urban District Council of Warrington to put in force the Compulsory Clauses of the Lands Clauses Acts.	
Waterford and Limerick Railway Act 1895	58 & 59 Vict. c. xlii	20 June 1895
An Act to confer further powers on the Waterford and Limerick Railway Company.
Brymbo Water Act 1895	58 & 59 Vict. c. xliii	20 June 1895
An Act to authorise the Brymbo Water Company to raise additional capital and for other purposes.
Bank of Bolton Limited Act 1895	58 & 59 Vict. c. xliv	20 June 1895
An Act to re arrange the Capital of the Bank of Bolton Limited and for other purposes.
Ambleside Urban District Council (Gas and Water) Act 1895	58 & 59 Vict. c. xlv	20 June 1895
An Act to provide for the transfer of the Undertaking of the Ambleside District Gas and Water Company Limited to the Ambleside Urban District Council and to confer further powers on the said Council with respect to the supply of Gas and Water and for other purposes.
South Eastern Railway Act 1895	58 & 59 Vict. c. xlvi	20 June 1895
An Act to confer further powers on the South Eastern Railway Company in reference to their own Undertaking and the Undertakings of other Companies and for other purposes.
Lancashire and Yorkshire Railway Act 1895	58 & 59 Vict. c. xlvii	20 June 1895
An Act for conferring further Powers on the Lancashire and Yorkshire Railway Company with relation to their own Undertaking and upon that Company and the London and North Western Railway Company with relation to the Preston and Wyre Railway and for other purposes.
Barry Railway Act 1895	58 & 59 Vict. c. xlviii	20 June 1895
An Act to confer powers on the Barry Railway Company for the acquisition of lands and for other purposes.
Vale of Glamorgan Railway Act 1895	58 & 59 Vict. c. xlix	20 June 1895
An Act for conferring further powers on the Vale of Glamorgan Railway Company for the construction of works the acquisition of lands the raising of money and otherwise in relation to their undertaking and for other purposes.
Education Department Provisional Order Confirmation (Acton) Act 1895	58 & 59 Vict. c. l	27 June 1895
An Act to confirm a Provisional Order made by the Education Department under the Elementary Education Act 1870 (Note: Elementary Education Act 1870 (33 & 34 Vict. c. 75)) to enable the School Board for Acton to put in force the Lands Clauses Acts.
	Provisional Order for putting in force the Lands Clauses Acts.	
Education Department Provisional Order Confirmation (Bristol) Act 1895	58 & 59 Vict. c. li	27 June 1895
An Act to confirm a Provisional Order made by the Education Department under the Elementary Education Act 1870 to enable the School Board for Bristol to put in force the Lands Clauses Acts.
	Provisional Order for putting in force the Lands Clauses Acts.	
Education Department Provisional Order Confirmation (Croydon) Act 1895	58 & 59 Vict. c. lii	27 June 1895
An Act to confirm a Provisional Order made by the Education Department under the Elementary Education Acts 1870 to 1893 to enable the School Board for Croydon to put in force the Lands Clauses Acts.
	Provisional Order for putting in force the Lands Clauses Acts.	
Education Department Provisional Order Confirmation (Hornsey) Act 1895	58 & 59 Vict. c. liii	27 June 1895
An Act to confirm a Provisional Order made by the Education Department under the Elementary Education Act 1870 to enable the School Board for Hornsey to put in force the Lands Clauses Acts.
	Provisional Order for putting in force the Lands Clauses Acts.	
Education Department Provisional Orders Confirmation (Leeds) Act 1895	58 & 59 Vict. c. liv	27 June 1895
An Act to confirm certain Provisional Orders made by the Education Department under the Elementary Education Act 1870 to enable the School Board for Leeds to put in force the Lands Clauses Acts.
	Provisional Order for putting in force the Lands Clauses Acts.	
	Provisional Order for putting in force the Lands Clauses Acts.	
Education Department Provisional Order Confirmation (Liverpool) Act 1895 (repealed)	58 & 59 Vict. c. lv	27 June 1895
An Act to confirm a Provisional Order made by the Education Department under the Elementary Education Act 1870 to enable the School Board for Liverpool to put in force the Lands Clauses Acts. (Repealed by Liverpool Corporation Act 1921 (11 & 12 Geo. 5. c. lxxiv))
	Provisional Order for putting in force the Lands Clauses Acts.	
Education Department Provisional Order Confirmation (Llangollen) Act 1895	58 & 59 Vict. c. lvi	27 June 1895
An Act to confirm a Provisional Order made by the Education Department under the Elementary Education Act 1870 to enable the School Board for Llangollen to put in force the Lands Clauses Acts.
	Provisional Order for putting in force the Lands Clauses Acts.	
Education Department Provisional Orders Confirmation (Longbenton) Act 1895	58 & 59 Vict. c. lvii	27 June 1895
An Act to confirm a Provisional Order made by the Education Department under the Elementary Education Act 1870 to enable the School Board for Longbenton to put in force the Lands Clauses Acts.
	Provisional Order for putting in force the Lands Clauses Acts.	
Education Department Provisional Order Confirmation (Lowestoft) Act 1895	58 & 59 Vict. c. lviii	27 June 1895
An Act to confirm a Provisional Order made by the Education Department under the Elementary Education Act 1870 to enable the School Board for Lowestoft to put in force the Lands Clauses Acts.
	Provisional Order for putting in force the Lands Clauses Acts.	
Education Department Provisional Order Confirmation (Manchester) Act 1895	58 & 59 Vict. c. lix	27 June 1895
An Act to confirm a Provisional Order made by the Education Department under the Elementary Education Act 1870 to enable the School Board for Manchester to put in force the Lands Clauses Acts.
	Provisional Order for putting in force the Lands Clauses Acts.	
Education Department Provisional Order Confirmation (Pwllheli) Act 1895	58 & 59 Vict. c. lx	27 June 1895
An Act to confirm a Provisional Order made by the Education Department under the Elementary Education Act 1870 to enable the School Board for Pwllheli to put in force the Lands Clauses Acts.
	Provisional Order for putting in force the Lands Clauses Acts.	
Education Department Provisional Order Confirmation (Weston-super-Mare) Act 1895	58 & 59 Vict. c. lxi	27 June 1895
An Act to confirm a Provisional Order made by the Education Department under the Elementary Education Act 1870 to enable the School Board for Weston super Mare to put in force the Lands Clauses Acts.
	Provisional Order for putting in force the Lands Clauses Acts.	
Education Department Provisional Order Confirmation (Wilmington) Act 1895	58 & 59 Vict. c. lxii	27 June 1895
An Act to confirm a Provisional Order made by the Education Department under the Elementary Education Act 1870 to enable the School Board for Wilmington to put in force the Lands Clauses Acts.
	Provisional Order for putting in force the Lands Clauses Acts.	
Local Government Board (Ireland) Provisional Orders Confirmation (No. 3) Act 1895	58 & 59 Vict. c. lxiii	27 June 1895
An Act to confirm two Provisional Orders made by the Local Government Board for Ireland under the Housing of the Working Classes Act 1890 (Note: Housing of the Working Classes Act 1890 (53 & 54 Vict. c. 70)) and the Public Health (Ireland) Act 1878 relating to the Urban Sanitary District of the Township of Blackrock.
	Blackrock Township Provisional Order 1895 No. 1 Confirming an Improvement Scheme under Part I. of the Housing of the Working Classes Act 1890.	
	Blackrock (No. 2) Provisional Order 1895 Town of Blackrock. Provisional Order.	
Local Government Board (Ireland) Provisional Order Confirmation (No. 4) Act 1895	58 & 59 Vict. c. lxiv	27 June 1895
An Act to confirm a Provisional Order made by the Local Government Board for Ireland under the Public Health (Ireland) Act 1878 relating to the Urban Sanitary District of Dublin.
	Dublin Waterworks Provisional Order 1895 Dublin Waterworks. Provisional Order.	
Metropolitan Police Provisional Order Confirmation Act 1895 (repealed)	58 & 59 Vict. c. lxv	27 June 1895
An Act to confirm a Provisional Order made by one of Her Majesty's Principal Secretaries of State under the Metropolitan Police Act 1886 (Note: Metropolitan Police Act 1886 (49 & 50 Vict. c. 22)) relating to lands in the Parishes of St Pancras and Wimbledon. (Repealed by Statute Law (Repeals) Act 2008 (c. 12))
Electric Lighting Orders Confirmation (No. 1) Act 1895 (repealed)	58 & 59 Vict. c. lxvi	27 June 1895
An Act to confirm certain Provisional Orders made by the Board of Trade under the Electric Lighting Acts 1882 to 1890 relating to Motherwell and Stirling. (Repealed by South of Scotland Electricity Order Confirmation Act 1956 (4 & 5 Eliz. 2. c. xciv))
	Motherwell Electric Lighting Order 1895	
	Stirling Electric Lighting Order 1895	
Electric Lighting Orders Confirmation (No. 2) Act 1895	58 & 59 Vict. c. lxvii	27 June 1895
An Act to confirm certain Provisional Orders made by the Board of Trade under the Electric Lighting Acts 1882 (Note: Electric Lighting Act 1882 (45 & 46 Vict. c. 56)) and 1888 (Note: Electric Lighting Act 1888 (51 & 52 Vict. c. 12)) relating to Alderley Edge Leigh Llandudno Luton Radcliffe and Swindon New Town.
	Alderley Edge Electric Lighting Order 1895	
	Leigh Electric Lighting Order 1895	
	Llandudno Electric Lighting Order 1895	
	Luton Corporation Electric Lighting Order 1895	
	Radcliffe Electric Lighting Order 1895	
	Swindon New Town Electric Lighting Order 1895	
Electric Lighting Orders Confirmation (No. 3) Act 1895	58 & 59 Vict. c. lxviii	27 June 1895
An Act to confirm certain Provisional Orders made by the Board of Trade under the Electric Lighting Acts 1882 and 1888 relating to Carlisle Pontypool Walthamstow Winchester and Worthing.
	Carlisle Corporation Electric Lighting Order 1895	
	Pontypool Electric Lighting Order 1895	
	Walthamstow Electric Lighting Order 1895	
	Winchester Electric Lighting Order 1895	
	Worthing Electric Lighting Order 1895	
Pier and Harbour Orders Confirmation (No. 1) Act 1895	58 & 59 Vict. c. lxix	27 June 1895
An Act to confirm certain Provisional Orders made by the Board of Trade under the General Pier and Harbour Act 1861 relating to Minehead Morecambe and Woody Bay.
	Minehead Pier and Harbour Order 1895	
	Woody Bay Pier Order 1895	
Poole Harbour Act 1895	58 & 59 Vict. c. lxx	27 June 1895
An Act to incorporate Harbour Commissioners for the harbour of Poole in the county of Dorset and to transfer to and vest in them the harbour undertaking of the corporation of Poole as trustees of the quays and harbour of Poole and for other purposes.
Carrickfergus Commissioners Act 1895	58 & 59 Vict. c. lxxi	27 June 1895
An Act to enable the Municipal Commissioners of the Borough of Carrickfergus to levy Rates for sanitary purposes to divide the County of the Town of Carrickfergus into Urban and Rural Sanitary Districts to constitute the Commissioners the Sanitary Authority for those districts respectively and for other purposes.
Lynton and Barnstaple Railway Act 1895	58 & 59 Vict. c. lxxii	27 June 1895
An Act for making a Railway between Barnstaple and Lynton in the County of Devon and for other purposes.
Phoenix Assurance Company's Act 1895	58 & 59 Vict. c. lxxiii	27 June 1895
An Act to repeal and re-enact with amendments the Phoenix Assurance Company's Act 1813 (Note: Phoenix Assurance Company of London Act 1813 (53 Geo. 3. c. ccxii)) to make further provisions in relation to the laws objects regulations and capital of the Company and for other purposes.
Downing College Act 1895	58 & 59 Vict. c. lxxiv	27 June 1895
An Act to enable the Master Professors Fellows and Scholars of Downing College in the University of Cambridge to sell and to lease on long leases and otherwise improve part of their Estate situate in the Parishes of St. Botolph St. Andrew-the-Great St. Benedict and St. Mary-the-Less in the Town of Cambridge and for other purposes.
Commons Regulation (Bexhill) Provisional Order Confirmation Act 1895	58 & 59 Vict. c. lxxv	6 July 1895
An Act to confirm a Provisional Order of the Board of Agriculture relating to the Regulation of Bexhill Down in the county of Sussex.
	Bexhill Down Order 1895	
Commons Regulation (Halifax) Provisional Order Confirmation Act 1895 (repealed)	58 & 59 Vict. c. lxxvi	6 July 1895
An Act to confirm a Provisional Order of the Board of Agriculture relating to the Regulation of High Road Well Moor in the Borough of Halifax. (Repealed by West Yorkshire Act 1980 (c. xiv))
	High Road Well Moor Order 1895	
Inclosure (Castor and Ailsworth) Provisional Order Confirmation Act 1895	58 & 59 Vict. c. lxxvii	6 July 1895
An Act to confirm a Provisional Order of the Board of Agriculture relating to the inclosure of certain lands in the parishes of Castor and Ailsworth in the county of Northampton.
	Castor and Ailsworth (Northamptonshire) Common Order 1895	
Inclosure (Upton St. Leonards) Provisional Order Confirmation Act 1895	58 & 59 Vict. c. lxxviii	6 July 1895
An Act to confirm a Provisional Order of the Board of Agriculture relating to the inclosure of certain lands in the parish of Upton St. Leonards in the county of Gloucester.
	Upton St. Leonards (Gloucestershire) Common Order 1895	
Pier and Harbour Order Confirmation (No. 3) Act 1895	58 & 59 Vict. c. lxxix	6 July 1895
An Act to confirm a Provisional Order made by the Board of Trade under the General Pier and Harbour Act 1861 relating to Blacksness.
	Blacksness (Scalloway) Pier Order 1895	
Local Government Board (Ireland) Provisional Order Confirmation (No. 5) Act 1895	58 & 59 Vict. c. lxxx	6 July 1895
An Act to confirm a Provisional Order made by the Local Government Board for Ireland under the Public Health (Ireland) Act 1878 relating to the Rural Sanitary District of Mountmelick.
	Maryborough Waterworks Provisional Order 1895	
Local Government Board (Ireland) Provisional Order Confirmation (No. 7) Act 1895	58 & 59 Vict. c. lxxxi	6 July 1895
An Act to confirm a Provisional Order made by the Local Government Board for Ireland under the Public Health (Ireland) Act 1878 relating to the Rural Sanitary District of Rathdrum.
	Kilpedder Sewage Provisional Order 1895	
Local Government Board (Ireland) Provisional Order Confirmation (No. 8) Act 1895	58 & 59 Vict. c. lxxxii	6 July 1895
An Act to confirm a Provisional Order made by the Local Government Board for Ireland under the Public Health (Ireland) Act 1878 relating to the Urban Sanitary District of Kells.
	Kells Waterworks Provisional Order 1895	
Local Government Board (Ireland) Provisional Order Confirmation (No. 9) Act 1895	58 & 59 Vict. c. lxxxiii	6 July 1895
An Act to confirm a Provisional Order made by the Local Government Board for Ireland under the Public Health (Ireland) Act 1878 relating to the Urban Sanitary District of Londonderry.
	Londonderry Provisional Order 1895	
Local Government Board (Ireland) Provisional Order Confirmation (No. 10) Act 1895	58 & 59 Vict. c. lxxxiv	6 July 1895
An Act to confirm a Provisional Order made by the Local Government Board for Ireland under the Public Health (Ireland) Act 1878 relating to the Urban Sanitary District of Dublin.
	Dublin Main Drainage Provisional Order 1895	
Local Government Board's Provisional Orders Confirmation (No. 4) Act 1895	58 & 59 Vict. c. lxxxv	6 July 1895
An Act to confirm certain Provisional Orders of the Local Government Board relating to Cardiff Clitheroe Luton and Portsmouth.
	Borough of Cardiff Order 1895	
	Borough of Clitheroe Order 1895	
	Borough of Luton Order 1895	
	Borough of Portsmouth Order 1895	
Local Government Board's Provisional Orders Confirmation (No. 5) Act 1895	58 & 59 Vict. c. lxxxvi	6 July 1895
An Act to confirm certain Provisional Orders of the Local Government Board relating to the Counties of Chester Derby East Sussex Hereford Kent Northampton Salop Southampton Stafford Warwick West Sussex and Worcester.
	County of Salop (Tittenley) Order 1895	
	County of Stafford (Drayton Bassett and Croxhall) Order 1895	
	County of East Sussex (Broomhill) Order 1895	
	County of West Sussex (Crawley) Order 1895	
	Counties of Hereford and Salop (Leintwardine and Ludford) Order 1895	
	County of Kent (Lamberhurst and Horsemonden) Order 1895	
	County of Warwick (Stoneton) Order 1895	
	County of Salop (Sheriff Hales) Order 1895	
	County of Worcester (Dowles and Upper Arley) Order 1895	
	County of Southampton (Bramshott) Order 1895	
Local Government Board's Provisional Orders Confirmation (No. 6) Act 1895	58 & 59 Vict. c. lxxxvii	6 July 1895
An Act to confirm certain Provisional Orders of the Local Government Board relating to Bangor Chorley Derby Hyde Kingston upon Hull Skipton and Southport.
	Bangor Order 1895	
	Chorley Order 1895	
	Derby Order 1895	
	Hyde Order 1895	
	Kingston-upon-Hull Order 1895	
	Skipton Order 1895	
	Southport Order 1895	
Local Government Board's Provisional Orders Confirmation (No. 8) Act 1895	58 & 59 Vict. c. lxxxviii	6 July 1895
An Act to confirm certain Provisional Orders of the Local Government Board relating to Bognor Llandudno Ramsgate Runcorn South Anston and Walsall.
	Bognor Order 1895	
	Llandudno Order 1895	
	Ramsgate Order 1895	
	Runcorn Order 1895	
	Walsall Order 1895	
Local Government Board's Provisional Orders Confirmation (No. 9) Act 1895	58 & 59 Vict. c. lxxxix	6 July 1895
An Act to confirm certain Provisional Orders of the Local Government Board relating to the counties of Cambridge Durham Isle of Ely Huntingdon Lancaster Norfolk Northampton Westmorland West Suffolk and the East North and West Ridings of Yorkshire.
	County of Cambridge (Papworth St. Agnes) Order 1895	
	County of Durham (Linthorpe) Order 1895	
	Counties of the Isle of Ely and Norfolk (Redmere and Welney) Order 1895	
	Counties of Huntingdon and Northampton (Luddington, &c.) Order 1895	
	County of Westmorland (Dalton) Order 1895	
	County of West Suffolk (Brandon) Order 1895	
	County of the West Riding of Yorkshire (Knedlington) Order 1895	
Local Government Board's Provisional Orders Confirmation (No. 11) Act 1895	58 & 59 Vict. c. xc	6 July 1895
An Act to confirm certain Provisional Orders of the Local Government Board relating to the Kettering the Upton-upon-Severn and Pershore and the Wath and North Rotherham Joint Hospital Districts.
	Kettering Joint Hospital Order 1895	
	Upton-upon-Severn and Pershore Joint Hospital Order 1895	
	Wath and North Rotherham Joint Hospital Order 1895	
Local Government Board's Provisional Orders Confirmation (No. 12) Act 1895	58 & 59 Vict. c. xci	6 July 1895
An Act to confirm certain Provisional Orders of the Local Government Board relating to the counties of Berks Carnarvon Derby Dorset the Parts of Lindsey Merioneth Nottingham Somerset Southampton Wilts and the West Riding of Yorkshire.
	Counties and Berkshire and Wiltshire (Combe Hungerford and Shalbourn) Order 1895	
	County of Carnarvon (Beddgelert) Order 1895	
	Counties of Derby and Nottingham (Kirkby-in-Ashfield and Pinxton) Order 1895	
	Counties of Dorset and Somerset (Goathill, &c.) Order 1895	
	County of Nottingham (Bole and West Burton) Order 1895	
	Counties of Nottingham and West Riding of Yorkshire (Auckley and Wallingwells) Order 1895	
	County of Wiltshire (Gaspar and Yarnfield) Order 1895	
	County of Southampton (Bramshaw, &c.) Order 1895	
Local Government Board's Provisional Orders Confirmation (No. 13) Act 1895	58 & 59 Vict. c. xcii	6 July 1895
An Act to confirm certain Provisional Orders of the Local Government Board relating to Sunderland Taunton and Weymouth and Melcombe Regis.
	Borough of Sunderland Order 1895	
	Borough of Taunton Order 1895	
	Borough of Weymouth and Melcombe Regis Order 1895	
Local Government Board's Provisional Orders Confirmation (Housing of Working Classes) Act 1895	58 & 59 Vict. c. xciii	6 July 1895
An Act to confirm certain Provisional Orders of the Local Government Board under the Housing of the Working Classes Act 1890 relating to Birmingham Limehouse District (London) and Southampton.
	Birmingham (Housing of Working Classes) Order 1895	
	Limehouse (Queen Catherine Court Brook Street) Order 1895	
	Southampton Order 1895	
Local Government Board's Provisional Orders Confirmation (Housing of Working Classes) (No. 2) Act 1895	58 & 59 Vict. c. xciv	6 July 1895
An Act to confirm a Provisional Order of the Local Government Board under the Housing of the Working Classes Act 1890 relating to Leigh.
	Leigh Order 1895	
Local Government Board's Provisional Orders Confirmation (Poor Law) Act 1895	58 & 59 Vict. c. xcv	6 July 1895
An Act to confirm certain Provisional Orders of the Local Government Board relating to the Chichester Incorporation and the parish of Saint George in the East (London).
	Chichester (Poor Law) Order 1895	
	St. George in the East Order 1895	
Local Government Board's Provisional Order Confirmation (Gas) Act 1895	58 & 59 Vict. c. xcvi	6 July 1895
An Act to confirm a Provisional Order of the Local Government Board under the Gas and Water Works Facilities Act 1870 (Note: Gas and Water Works Facilities Act 1870 (33 & 34 Vict. c. 70)) and the Public Health Act 1875 (Note: Public Health Act 1875 (38 & 39 Vict. c. 55)) relating to Saint Ives Cornwall.
	St. Ives (Cornwall) Gas Order 1895	
Drainage and Improvement of Lands Supplemental (Ireland) Act 1895	58 & 59 Vict. c. xcvii	6 July 1895
An Act to confirm a Provisional Order under the Drainage and Improvement of Lands Ireland Acts 1863 to 1892 relating to Carrigrohane Maglin and Ballincollig Drainage District County Cork.
	Carrigrohane, Maglin and Ballincollig Drainage District (Cork) Order 1895	
Paisley Provisional Order Confirmation Act 1895	58 & 59 Vict. c. xcviii	6 July 1895
An Act to confirm a Provisional Order made by the Secretary for Scotland under the Burgh Police (Scotland) Act 1892 (Note: Burgh Police (Scotland) Act 1892 (55 & 56 Vict. c. 55)) and the Burgh Police (Scotland) Act 1892 Amendment Act 1894 (Note: Burgh Police (Scotland) Act 1892 Amendment Act 1894 (57 & 58 Vict. c. 18)) to increase the number of magistrates and councillors in the burgh of Paisley.
	Paisley Order 1895	
Water Orders Confirmation Act 1895	58 & 59 Vict. c. xcix	6 July 1895
An Act to confirm certain Provisional Orders made by the Board of Trade under the Gas and Water Works Facilities Act 1870 relating to Holyhead Water Mid Kent Water and South Hayling Water.
	Holyhead Water Order 1895	
	Mid Kent Water Order 1895	
	South Hayling Water Order 1895	
Tramways Orders Confirmation (No. 1) Act 1895	58 & 59 Vict. c. c	6 July 1895
An Act to confirm certain Provisional Orders made by the Board of Trade under the Tramways Act 1870 (Note: Tramways Act 1870 (33 & 34 Vict. c. 78)) relating to City of Gloucester Tramways London United Tramways and Somerton Keinton Mandeville and Castle Cary Tramways.
	City of Gloucester Tramways Order 1895	
	London United Tramways Order 1895	
	Somerton, Keinton-Mandeville and Castle Cary Tramways Order 1895	
Tramways Order Confirmation (No. 2) Act 1895	58 & 59 Vict. c. ci	6 July 1895
An Act to confirm certain Provisional Orders made by the Board of Trade under the Tramways Act 1870 relating to Hartlepools Tramways Hartlepool Electric Tramways Newcastle upon Tyne Corporation Tramways and Wigan and District Tramways.
	Hartlepools Tramways Order 1895	
	Hartlepool Electric Tramways Order 1895	
	Newcastle-upon-Tyne Tramways Order 1895	
	Wigan and District Tramways Order 1895	
Electric Lighting Orders Confirmation (No. 5) Act 1895	58 & 59 Vict. c. cii	6 July 1895
An Act to confirm certain Provisional Orders made by the Board of Trade under the Electric Lighting Acts 1882 and 1888 relating to Bootle New Windsor and Eton Prescot Salisbury Southampton and Windermere and District.
	Bootle Corporation Electric Lighting Order 1895 Provisional Order granted by the Board of Trade under the Electric Lighting Acts 1882 and 1888 to the Mayor Aldermen and Burgesses of the Borough of Bootle.	
	New Windsor Corporation Electric Lighting Order 1895 Provisional Order granted by the Board of Trade under the Electric Lighting Acts 1882 and 1888 to the Mayor Aldermen and Burgesses of the Borough of New Windsor.	
	Prescot Electric Lighting Order 1895 Provisional Order granted by the Board of Trade under the Electric Lighting Acts 1882 and 1888 to the British Insulated Wire Company Limited.	
	Salisbury Electric Lighting Order 1895 Provisional Order granted by the Board of Trade under the Electric Lighting Acts 1882 and 1888 to the Salisbury Electric Light and Supply Company Limited.	
	Southampton Electric Lighting Order 1895 Provisional Order granted by the Board of Trade under the Electric Lighting Acts 1882 and 1888 to the Southampton Electric Light and Power Company Limited.	
	Windermere and District Electric Lighting Order 1895 Provisional Order granted by the Board of Trade under the Electric Lighting Acts 1882 and 1888 to the Windermere and District Electric Supply Company Limited.	
Electric Lighting Order Confirmation (No. 6) Act 1895 (repealed)	58 & 59 Vict. c. ciii	6 July 1895
An Act to confirm a Provisional Order made by the Board of Trade under the Electric Lighting Acts 1882 and 1888 relating to Liverpool. (Repealed by Liverpool Corporation Act 1921 (11 & 12 Geo. 5. c. lxxiv))
	Liverpool Electric Lighting Order 1895 Provisional Order granted by the Board of Trade under the Electric Lighting Acts 1882 and 1888 to the Liverpool Electric Supply Company Limited in respect of a part of the City of Liverpool.	
Belfast and Northern Counties Railway Act 1895	58 & 59 Vict. c. civ	6 July 1895
An Act to empower the Belfast and Northern Counties Railway Company to make a railway to Magilligan Point to purchase the Draperstown Railway from the Commissioners of Public Works in Ireland to raise further Capital and for other Purposes.
Greenock Harbour Act 1895 (repealed)	58 & 59 Vict. c. cv	6 July 1895
An Act to alter and extend the powers of the Trustees of the Port and Harbours of Greenock in relation to the warehousing of goods and for other purposes. (Repealed by Greenock Port and Harbours Consolidation Act 1913 (3 & 4 Geo. 5. c. xlii))
Kingstown and Kingsbridge Junction Railway (Extension of Time) Act 1895 (repealed)	58 & 59 Vict. c. cvi	6 July 1895
An Act to further revive the Powers for the compulsory Purchase of Lands and to further extend the time limited for the completion of certain of the Railways authorised by the Kingstown and Kingsbridge Junction Railway Act 1887 (Note: Kingstown and Kingsbridge Junction Railway Act 1887 (c. clxix)) and for other purposes. (Repealed by Kingstown and Kingsbridge Junction Railway Act 1898 (50 & 51 Vict. c. ccxlvi))
Staffordshire Potteries Stipendiary Justice Act 1895 (repealed)	58 & 59 Vict. c. cvii	6 July 1895
An Act to amend the Staffordshire Potteries Stipendiary Justice Acts 1839 (Note: Staffordshire Potteries Stipendiary Justice Act 1839 (2 & 3 Vict. c. 15)) and 1871 (Note: Staffordshire Potteries Stipendiary Justice Act 1871 (34 & 35 Vict. c. xc)) and for other purposes. (Repealed by Justices of the Peace Act 1968 (c. 69))
Liskeard and Looe Railway Extension Act 1895	58 & 59 Vict. c. cviii	6 July 1895
An Act for authorising the Liskeard and Looe Union Canal Company to extend their Railway and for other purposes.
Rhondda and Swansea Bay Railway Act 1895	58 & 59 Vict. c. cix	6 July 1895
An Act to confer further powers upon the Rhondda and Swansea Bay Railway Company and for other purposes.
Swansea Harbour Act 1895	58 & 59 Vict. c. cx	6 July 1895
An Act to authorise the Swansea Harbour Trustees to make a New Opening or Swing Bridge over the New Cut to construct a Lock or half-tide Basin and certain Railways Roads and Works to borrow further money and for other purposes.
Weaver Navigation Act 1895	58 & 59 Vict. c. cxi	6 July 1895
An Act to substitute for the existing Trustees of the River Weaver Navigation a representative trust and to transfer to such representative trust the powers and duties of the existing Trustees and to repeal and amend certain provisions of the Acts relating to the River Weaver.
Great Northern and City Railway Act 1895	58 & 59 Vict. c. cxii	6 July 1895
An Act to extend the powers for the purchase of Lands and the time for the completion of the Great Northern and City Railway.
Warehousemen, Clerks and Drapers' Schools Act 1895 (repealed)	58 & 59 Vict. c. cxiii	6 July 1895
An Act to enable a certain Fundamental Rule of the Institution called "The Warehousemen Clerks and Drapers' Schools" to be repealed altered or amended at a Special Court of the Institution and for other purposes. (Repealed by Royal Warehousemen Clerks and Drapers' Schools Act 1954 (2 & 3 Eliz. 2. c. xxxix))
Land Securities Company Act 1895	58 & 59 Vict. c. cxiv	6 July 1895
An Act to make provision with respect to the winding up of the Land Securities Company Limited and for the delivery out of the Office of Land Registry of the Securities deposited with that Office by that Company under the Mortgage Debenture Act 1865 (Note: Mortgage Debenture Act 1865 (28 & 29 Vict. c. 78)) and the Mortgage Debenture (Amendment) Act 1870 (Note: Mortgage Debenture (Amendment) Act 1870 (33 & 34 Vict. c. 20)) and for other purposes.
Bridlington Water Act 1895 (repealed)	58 & 59 Vict. c. cxv	6 July 1895
An Act for incorporating and conferring powers on the Bridlington Water Company. (Repealed by Humberside Act 1982 (c. iii))
Lanarkshire and Dumbartonshire Railway Act 1895	58 & 59 Vict. c. cxvi	6 July 1895
An Act to confer further Powers on the Lanarkshire and Dumbartonshire Railway Company and for other purposes.
Sutton Harbour Act 1895	58 & 59 Vict. c. cxvii	6 July 1895
An Act to authorise the Sutton Harbour Improvement Company to construct a new Quay and to revive and extend the powers of the Sutton Harbour Act 1889 (Note: Sutton Harbour Act 1889 (52 & 53 Vict. c. cxcii)) for the construction of a Quay and Roadway and the establishment of a Fish Market in connexion with their existing Undertaking at the Harbour of Sutton Pool in the County of Devon to provide for the conversion and consolidation of their existing and authorised shares and to raise further capital and for other purposes.
Great Western Railway Act 1895	58 & 59 Vict. c. cxviii	6 July 1895
An Act for conferring further powers upon the Great Western Railway Company in respect of their own undertaking and upon that Company and the London and North Western Railway Company in respect of undertakings in which they are jointly interested and upon the Great Western Railway Company and the Lambourn Valley Railway Company in respect of the undertaking of that Company and for other purposes.
Oldham and Royton Canal Act 1895	58 & 59 Vict. c. cxix	6 July 1895
An Act for authorising the construction of a Canal or Waterway and other works in Lancashire to be called the Oldham and Royton Canal and for other purposes.
Bute Docks Act 1895	58 & 59 Vict. c. cxx	6 July 1895
An Act for empowering the Bute Docks Company to extend the Seawalls or Embankments authorised by the Bute Docks Act 1882 (Note: Bute Docks Act 1882 (45 & 46 Vict. c. ccxlii)) and subsequent Acts and to make further provision with respect to the Capital of the Company and for other purposes.
North Pembrokeshire and Fishguard Railway Act 1895	58 & 59 Vict. c. cxxi	6 July 1895
An Act to extend the time for the completion of the North Pembrokeshire and Fishguard Railway and to authorise the construction of new Railways in the Counties of Pembroke and Carmarthen and for other purposes.
Taff Vale Railway Act 1895	58 & 59 Vict. c. cxxii	6 July 1895
An Act to enlarge the powers of the Taff Vale Railway Company for the construction of Works and the acquisition of Lands to enable them to establish Savings Banks and for other purposes.
City of Dublin Steam Packet Company's Act 1895 (repealed)	58 & 59 Vict. c. cxxiii	6 July 1895
An Act for making the Railway and Canal Traffic Acts applicable to the Steamers of the City of Dublin Steam Packet Company between Holyhead and Kingstown during any Mail Contract to authorise that Company to borrow money and for other purposes. (Repealed by Statute Law (Repeals) Act 2013 (c. 2))
Wirral Railway Act 1895	58 & 59 Vict. c. cxxiv	6 July 1895
An Act to authorise the Wirral Railway Company to make a Railway and other Works near Seacombe and for other purposes.
Glasgow and South Western Railway Act 1895	58 & 59 Vict. c. cxxv	6 July 1895
An Act for conferring further powers on the Glasgow and South Western Railway Company for the construction of works the acquisition of lands and the raising of money and for other purposes.
London and North Western Railway Act 1895	58 & 59 Vict. c. cxxvi	6 July 1895
An Act for conferring further powers upon the London and North Western Railway Company in relation to their own undertaking and other undertakings in which they are interested jointly with other companies and also for conferring powers upon the Great Western Railway Company and the Midland Railway Company in relation to such other under takings and for other purposes.
London County Council (General Powers) Act 1895 (repealed)	58 & 59 Vict. c. cxxvii	6 July 1895
An Act to empower the London County Council to make street improvements and to purchase lands for various purposes to make provisions with respect to contributions by local authorities the formation of wards in parishes and the management of parks to authorise the grant of a pension to the Chairman of Quarter Sessions for the County of London and the payment of compensation in certain cases and for other purposes. (Repealed by Local Law (Greater London Council and Inner London Boroughs) Order 1965 (SI 1965/540))
Brighouse Corporation Act 1895	58 & 59 Vict. c. cxxviii	6 July 1895
An Act to authorise the sale of the undertaking of the Rastrick Gas Company to the Brighouse Corporation to extend the district of the Burial Board and to make further and better provision in regard to the water supply health local government and improvement of the Borough and for other purposes.
London County Council (Vauxhall Bridge) Act 1895	58 & 59 Vict. c. cxxix	6 July 1895
An Act to empower the London County Council to rebuild Vauxhall Bridge and to execute other works in connexion therewith.
London County Council (Tower Bridge Southern Approach) Act 1895	58 & 59 Vict. c. cxxx	6 July 1895
An Act to empower the London County Council to make a new Approach to the Tower Bridge on the Southern Side of the River Thames.
Clonmel Corporation Act 1895	58 & 59 Vict. c. cxxxi	6 July 1895
An Act to extend the Boundaries of the Borough of Clonmel to provide for the transfer to the Corporation of Clonmel of the Undertaking of the Clonmel Gas Consumers Company Limited and for other purposes.
Solway Junction Railway (Transfer) Act 1895	58 & 59 Vict. c. cxxxii	6 July 1895
An Act to transfer the Solway Junction Railway to the Caledonian Railway Company and for other purposes.
Midland Railway Act 1895	58 & 59 Vict. c. cxxxiii	6 July 1895
An Act to confer Additional Powers upon the Midland Railway Company and the Midland and Great Northern Railways Joint Committee for the Construction of Works and the Acquisition of Lands to make provision for the transfer of the undertaking of the Cheltenham Station Company to the Midland Railway Company and for other purposes.
Cranbrook District Water Act 1895 (repealed)	58 & 59 Vict. c. cxxxiv	6 July 1895
An Act for incorporating the Cranbrook District Water Company and empowering them to construct Works and supply Water and for other purposes. (Repealed by Kent Water Act 1955 (4 & 5 Eliz. 2. c. xi))
Tenterden Railway Act 1895	58 & 59 Vict. c. cxxxv	6 July 1895
An Act to authorise the Construction of Railways from Headcorn to Tenterden and Appledore and for other purposes.
Aberdeen Harbour Act 1895 (repealed)	58 & 59 Vict. c. cxxxvi	6 July 1895
An Act to amend and consolidate the Acts relating to the Harbour of Aberdeen and for other purposes. (Repealed by Aberdeen Harbour Order Confirmation Act 1960 (9 & 10 Eliz. 2. c. i))
West Highland Railway Act 1895	58 & 59 Vict. c. cxxxvii	6 July 1895
An Act to confer powers on the West Highland Railway Company.
Derry City and County Railway (Abandonment) Act 1895	58 & 59 Vict. c. cxxxviii	6 July 1895
An Act to authorise the Abandonment of the Railway and Works authorised by the Derry City and County Railway Act 1892. (Note: Derry City and County Railway Act 1892 (55 & 56 Vict. c. clxxxv))
Torrington and Okehampton Railway Act 1895	58 & 59 Vict. c. cxxxix	6 July 1895
An Act for making a railway from Torrington to Okehampton in the county of Devon and for other purposes.
London County Council (Money) Act 1895 (repealed)	58 & 59 Vict. c. cxl	6 July 1895
An Act to regulate the expenditure of Money by the London County Council on Capital Account during the current Financial Period and the raising of Money to meet such expenditure. (Repealed by London County Council (Finance Consolidation) Act 1912 (2 & 3 Geo. 5. c. cv))
Lancashire, Derbyshire and East Coast Railway Act 1895	58 & 59 Vict. c. cxli	6 July 1895
An Act to confer further Powers on the Lancashire Derbyshire and East Coast Railway Company for the Construction of Works and Acquisition of Lands and for the Abandonment of some of their authorised Railways and for other purposes.
North Eastern Railway Act 1895	58 & 59 Vict. c. cxlii	6 July 1895
An Act to confer additional powers upon the North Eastern Railway Company for the construction of new Rail ways and other Works and the acquisition of additional Lands for the consolidation of certain of their Shares and Stocks and for other purposes.
Glasgow Corporation and Police Act 1895 (repealed)	58 & 59 Vict. c. cxliii	6 July 1895
An Act to transfer to and vest in the Corporation of Glasgow the powers of the Glasgow Police Commissioners and of the several Municipal Trusts of the City to make provision for the regulation of the office of Town Clerk and for the appointment of Stipendiary Magistrates to amend and extend the Police powers within the City and for other purposes. (Repealed by Statute Law (Repeals) Act 1995 (c. 44))
South Western Railway Act 1895	58 & 59 Vict. c. cxliv	6 July 1895
An Act for conferring further Powers upon the London and South Western Railway Company and to make further provision with respect to their Undertaking and other Undertakings in which they are interested and for enabling the Company and the Midland Railway Company to acquire additional Lands in connexion with the Somerset and Dorset Railway and for other purposes.
Neath, Pontardawe, and Bryn-aman Railway Act 1895	58 & 59 Vict. c. cxlv	6 July 1895
An Act for making and maintaining new railways in the county of Glamorgan to be called the Neath Pontardawe and Bryn-aman Railway and for other purposes.
Birmingham, North Warwickshire, and Stratford-upon-Avon Railway Act 1895	58 & 59 Vict. c. cxlvi	6 July 1895
An Act to authorise the Birmingham North Warwickshire and Stratford-upon-Avon Railway Company to divert portions of their authorised Railways in the Counties of Warwick and Worcester to acquire additional lands and for other purposes.
Chesterfield Gas and Water Board Act 1895 (repealed)	58 & 59 Vict. c. cxlvii	6 July 1895
An Act to constitute and incorporate a Gas and Water Board for the Borough of Chesterfield and the Districts adjacent thereto in the County of Derby to transfer to and vest in such Board the Undertaking of the Chesterfield Waterworks and Gaslight Company and for other purposes. (Repealed by Chesterfield Corporation Act 1923 (13 & 14 Geo. 5. c. xcix))
Manchester, Sheffield, and Lincolnshire Railway Act 1895	58 & 59 Vict. c. cxlviii	6 July 1895
An Act to confer further powers upon the Manchester Sheffield and Lincolnshire Railway Company the Metropolitan Railway Company the Wirral Railways Committee the Liverpool St. Helens and South Lancashire Railway Company the Wrexham Mold and Connah's Quay Railway Company and the Cheshire Lines Committee to change the name of the Wirral Railways Committee and for other purposes.
Thames and Severn Canal Trust Act 1895	58 & 59 Vict. c. cxlix	6 July 1895
An Act for vesting in a Public Trust to be incorporated for that purpose the Undertaking of the Company of Proprietors of the Thames and Severn Canal Navigation and for other purposes.
Latimer Road and Acton Railway Act 1895 (repealed)	58 & 59 Vict. c. cl	6 July 1895
An Act to extend the time for the compulsory purchase of lands for and for the completion of the Latimer Road and Acton Railway and for other purposes. (Repealed by Latimer Road and Acton Railway Act 1900 (63 & 64 Vict. c. xcv))
North British Railway Act 1895	58 & 59 Vict. c. cli	6 July 1895
An Act to confer further powers upon the North British Railway Company in connexion with their undertaking to construct Railways in connexion with the Kirkcaldy and District Railway to empower the East Fife Central Railway Company to make deviations in their authorised Railway for amalgamating the Kirkcaldy and District Railway Company and the East Fife Central Railway Company with the Company and for other purposes.
Highland Railway Act 1895	58 & 59 Vict. c. clii	6 July 1895
An Act to confer further powers on the Highland Railway Company and for other purposes.
London, Walthamstow, and Epping Forest Railway Act 1895 (repealed)	58 & 59 Vict. c. cliii	6 July 1895
An Act to authorise the London Walthamstow and Epping Forest Railway Company to divert and improve their authorised Railway and to form connexions between the same and other Railways and for other purposes. (Repealed by London, Walthamstow and Epping Forest Railway (Abandonment) Act 1900 (63 & 64 Vict. c. cclii))
Croydon Corporation Act 1895 (repealed)	58 & 59 Vict. c. cliv	6 July 1895
An Act to confer further powers upon the Mayor Aldermen and Burgesses of the County Borough of Croydon. (Repealed by Croydon Corporation Act 1960 (8 & 9 Eliz. 2. c. xl))
Bray Township Act 1895	58 & 59 Vict. c. clv	6 July 1895
An Act to authorise the Bray Township Commissioners to construct a Sewer for the more effectual Drainage of the Township and for other purposes.
Merthyr Tydfil District Council Waterworks Act 1895	58 & 59 Vict. c. clvi	6 July 1895
An Act to authorise the Urban District Council of Merthyr Tydfil to construct Additional Waterworks and for other purposes.
Bristol Corporation Act 1895	58 & 59 Vict. c. clvii	6 July 1895
An Act to extend the City and County of Bristol and for other purposes.
Southend-on-Sea Corporation Act 1895 (repealed)	58 & 59 Vict. c. clviii	6 July 1895
An Act for reviving the powers granted by the Southend Local Board Act 1887 (Note: Southend Local Board Act 1887 (50 & 51 Vict. c. v)) for the making of one of the Piers by that Act authorised for empowering the Corporation of the Borough of Southend on Sea to construct a new Pier and for conferring further powers on the Corporation in relation to buildings streets and sanitary matters and for making further and better provision for the improvement health and local government of the Borough and for other purposes. (Repealed by Essex Act 1987 (c. xx))

=== Sources ===
- The Public General Statutes, Volume 32: 58 & 59 and 59 Victoria – 1895. Law reports. Eyre and Spottiswoode – via HathiTrust.
- The Public General Statutes, Volume 32: 58 & 59 and 59 Victoria – 1895. Law reports. Eyre and Spottiswoode – via Google Books.
- Journal of the House of Commons. Vol. 150. London: His Majesty's Stationery Office. pp. 3–336.
- Chronological Table of and Index to the Statutes. Vol. 1: To the End of the Session 59 Vict. Sess. 2 (1895) (13th ed.). London: Her Majesty's Stationery Office. 1896. pp. 538–539 – via Google Books.

== 59 Vict. Sess. 2 ==
The first session of the 26th Parliament of the United Kingdom, which met from 12 August 1895 until 5 September 1895.

No private acts were passed during this session.

=== Public general acts ===
Short title	Citation	Royal assent
Long title
Expiring Laws Continuance Act 1895 Session 2 or the Expiring Laws Continuance Act 1895 (repealed)	59 Vict. Sess. 2. c. 1	5 September 1895
An Act to continue various Expiring Laws. (Repealed by Statute Law Revision Act 1908 (8 Edw. 7. c. 49))
Public Works Loans Act 1895 Session 2 or the Public Works Loans Act 1895 (repealed)	59 Vict. Sess. 2. c. 2	5 September 1895
An Act to grant Money for the purpose of certain Local Loans, and for other purposes relating to Local Loans. (Repealed by Statute Law Revision Act 1908 (8 Edw. 7. c. 49))
Canadian Speaker (Appointment of Deputy) Act 1895 Session 2 or the Canadian Speaker (Appointment of Deputy) Act 1895	59 Vict. Sess. 2. c. 3	5 September 1895
An Act for removing Doubts as to the Validity of an Act passed by the Parliament of the Dominion of Canada respecting the Deputy-Speaker of the Senate.
Purchase of Land (Ireland) Amendment Act 1895 Session 2 or the Purchase of Land (Ireland) Amendment Act 1895 (repealed)	59 Vict. Sess. 2. c. 4	5 September 1895
An Act to re-enact Section Thirteen of the Purchase of Land (Ireland) Act, 1891. (Note: Purchase of Land (Ireland) Act 1891 (54 & 55 Vict. c. 48)) (Repealed by Statute Law Revision Act 1950 (14 Geo. 6. c. 6))
Public Offices (Acquisition of Site) Act 1895 Session 2 or the Public Offices (Acquisition of Site) Act 1895 (repealed)	59 Vict. Sess. 2. c. 5	5 September 1895
An Act to provide for the Acquisition of a Site for Public Offices in Westminster and for purposes connected therewith. (Repealed by Statute Law Revision Act 1953 (2 & 3 Eliz. 2. c. 5))
Appropriation Act 1895 Session 2 (repealed)	59 Vict. Sess. 2. c. 6	5 September 1895
An Act to apply a sum out of the Consolidated Fund to the service of the year ending on the thirty-first day of March one thousand eight hundred and ninety-six, and to appropriate the Supplies granted in this Session of Parliament. (Repealed by Statute Law Revision Act 1908 (8 Edw. 7. c. 49))

=== Local acts ===
Short title	Citation	Royal assent
Long title
Gas Orders Confirmation Act 1895 Session 2 or the Gas Orders Confirmation Act 1895	59 Vict. Sess. 2. c. i	5 September 1895
An Act to confirm certain Provisional Orders made by the Board of Trade under the Gas and Water Works Facilities Act 1870 (Note: Gas and Water Works Facilities Act 1870 (33 & 34 Vict. c. 70)) relating to Barnstaple Gas Bognor Gas Felixstowe Gas and Kildwick Parish Gas.
	Barnstaple Gas Order 1895 Order empowering the Barnstaple Gas Company to raise additional capital.	
	Bognor Gas Order 1895 Order empowering the Bognor Gaslight and Coke Company Limited to construct additional works for the manufacture and storage of gas and for other purposes.	
	Felixstowe Gas Order 1895 Order empowering the Felixstowe Gaslight Company Limited to maintain and continue gasworks and to manufacture and supply gas in the parishes of Walton and Felixstowe in the county of Suffolk.	
	Kildwick Parish Gas Order 1895 Order empowering the Kildwick Parish Gas Company to raise additional capital.	
Gas and Water Orders Confirmation Act 1895 Session 2 or the Gas and Water Orders Confirmation Act 1895	59 Vict. Sess. 2. c. ii	5 September 1895
An Act to confirm certain Provisional Orders made by the Board of Trade under the Gas and Water Works Facilities Act 1870 relating to Llanberis Gas and Water Newark Gas and Rothwell Gas.
	Llanberis Gas and Water Order 1895 Order empowering the Llanberis Water and Gas Company Limited to maintain and continue Gasworks and Waterworks and to manufacture and supply Gas and to supply Water within the Parish of Llanberis in the County of Carnarvon.	
	Newark Gas Order 1895 Order empowering the Newark Gas Company to raise additional Capital to extend their Limits of Supply to construct and maintain additional Works and for other purposes.	
	Rothwell Gas Order 1895 Order empowering the Rothwell Gas Light Company to extend their Limits of Supply to purchase additional Lands.	
Education Department Provisional Orders Confirmation (London) Act 1895 Session 2 or the Education Department Provisional Orders Confirmation (London) Act 1895	59 Vict. Sess. 2. c. iii	5 September 1895
An Act to confirm a Provisional Order made by the Education Department under the Elementary Education Act 1870 (Note: Elementary Education Act 1870 (33 & 34 Vict. c. 75)) to enable the School Board for London to put in force the Lands Clauses Acts.
	London School Board Order 1895 Provisional Order for putting in force the Lands Clauses Acts.	
Pier and Harbour Orders Confirmation (No. 2) Act 1895 Session 2 or the Pier and Harbour Orders Confirmation (No. 2) Act 1895	59 Vict. Sess. 2. c. iv	5 September 1895
An Act to confirm certain Provisional Orders made by the Board of Trade under the General Pier and Harbour Act 1861 (Note: General Pier and Harbour Act 1861 (24 & 25 Vict. c. 45)) relating to Banff Bognor Dunoon Swanage and Whitehills.
	Banff Harbour Order 1895 Order for amending an Act passed in the Third and Fourth Years of the Reign of Her Majesty Queen Victoria (Note: Banff Government and Harbour Act 1840 (3 & 4 Vict. c. cxiv)) relating to Banff Harbour and for conferring further Powers upon the Banff Harbour Trustees.	
	Bognor Pier Order 1895 Order for Amending the Bognor Pier Order 1893 as to the Construction of portions of the Works and for other purposes.	
	Dunoon Burgh Pier Order 1895 Order for the construction maintenance and regulation of new Piers and Works at Dunoon in the county of Argyll.	
	Swanage Pier Order 1895 Order for the extension of the Pier at Swanage in the County of Dorset.	
	Whitehills Harbour Order 1895 Order for the construction and maintenance of works at the Harbour of Whitehills in the county of Banff and for constituting Harbour Commissioners and vesting in them the harbour and works and for the regulation of the harbour and for other purposes.	
Local Government Board's Provisional Orders Confirmation (No. 3) Act 1895 Session 2 or the Local Government Board's Provisional Orders Confirmation (No. 3) Act 1895	59 Vict. Sess. 2. c. v	5 September 1895
An Act to confirm certain Provisional Orders of the Local Government Board relating to Bradford-on-Avon Higham Ferrers Pocklington Pontypridd Saint George South Stoneham Tavistock and Upton upon Severn.
	Bradford-Upon-Avon Order 1895 Provisional Order to enable the Urban District Council of Bradford-on-Avon to put in force the Compulsory Clauses of the Lands Clauses Act.	
	Higham Ferrers Order 1895 Provisional Order to enable the Urban District Council for the Borough of Higham Ferrers to put in force the Compulsory Clauses of the Lands Clauses Act.	
	Pocklington Order 1895 Provisional Order to enable the Urban District Council of Pocklington to put in force the Compulsory Clauses of the Lands Clauses Act.	
	Pontypridd Order 1895 Provisional Order to enable the Urban District Council of Pontypridd to put in force the Compulsory Clauses of the Lands Clauses Act.	
	St. George Order 1895 Provisional Order to enable the Urban District Council of Saint George to put in force the Compulsory Clauses of the Lands Clauses Act.	
	South Stoneham Rural Order 1895 Provisional Order to enable the Rural District Council of South Stoneham to put in force the Compulsory Clauses of the Lands Clauses Act.	
	Tavistock Rural Order 1895 Provisional Order to enable the Rural District Council of Tavistock to put in force the Compulsory Clauses of the Lands Clauses Act.	
	Upton upon Severn (Hanley Castle and Welland) Order 1895 Provisional Order to enable the Rural District Council of Upton upon Severn to put in force the Compulsory Clauses of the Lands Clauses Act.	
Local Government Board's Provisional Orders Confirmation (No. 7) Act 1895 Session 2 or the Local Government Board's Provisional Orders Confirmation (No. 7) Act 1895	59 Vict. Sess. 2. c. vi	5 September 1895
An Act to confirm certain Provisional Orders of the Local Government Board relating to Bradford (Yorks) Bristol Leigh and Llandyssul.
	Bradford (Yorks) Order 1895 Provisional Order to enable the Sanitary Authority for the Borough of Bradford (Yorks) to put in force the Compulsory Clauses of the Land Clauses Acts.	
	Bristol Order 1895 Provisional Order to enable the Urban Sanitary Authority for the City of Bristol to put in force the Compulsory Clauses of the Land Clauses Acts.	
	Leigh Order 1895 Provisional Order to enable the Urban District Council of Leigh to put in force the Compulsory Clauses of the Land Clauses Acts.	
	Llandyssul Rural Order 1895 Provisional Order to enable the Rural District Council of Llandyssul to put in force the Compulsory Clauses of the Land Clauses Acts.	
Local Government Board's Provisional Order Confirmation (No. 10) Act 1895 Session 2 or the Local Government Board's Provisional Order Confirmation (No. 10) Act 1895 (repealed)	59 Vict. Sess. 2. c. vii	5 September 1895
An Act to confirm a Provisional Order of the Local Government Board relating to the City of Liverpool. (Repealed by County of Merseyside Act 1980 (c. x))
	City of Liverpool Order 1895 Provisional Order made in pursuance of Sections 54 and 59 of the Local Government Act 1888. (Note: Local Government Act 1888 (51 & 52 Vict. c. 41))	
Local Government Board's Provisional Orders Confirmation (No. 14) Act 1895 Session 2 or the Local Government Board's Provisional Orders Confirmation (No. 14) Act 1895	59 Vict. Sess. 2. c. viii	5 September 1895
An Act to confirm certain Provisional Orders of the Local Government Board relating to the Counties of Buckingham Cambridge Essex Oxford Salop Southampton Stafford Surrey Warwick West Suffolk and the North and West Ridings of Yorkshire.
	County of Buckingham (Ibstone) Order 1895 Provisional Order made in pursuance of Section 54 of the Local Government Act 1888 for altering the Boundary between Counties.	
	County of Buckingham (Stokenchurch) Order 1895 Provisional Order made in pursuance of Section 54 of the Local Government Act 1888 for altering the Boundary between Counties.	
	County of Oxford (Kingsey) Order 1895 Provisional Order made in pursuance of Section 54 of the Local Government Act 1888 for altering the Boundary between Counties.	
	County of Cambridge (Great Chishall, &c.) Order 1895 Provisional Order made in pursuance of Section 54 of the Local Government Act 1888 for altering the Boundary between Counties.	
	County of West Suffolk (Kedington) Order 1895 Provisional Order made in pursuance of Section 54 of the Local Government Act 1888 for altering the Boundary between Counties.	
	County of Oxford (Mollington) Order 1895 Provisional Order made in pursuance of Section 54 of the Local Government Act 1888 for altering the Boundary between Counties.	
	County of Stafford (Bobbington) Order 1895 Provisional Order made in pursuance of Section 54 of the Local Government Act 1888 for altering the Boundary between Counties.	
	County of Surrey (Dockenfield) Order 1895 Provisional Order made in pursuance of Section 54 of the Local Government Act 1888 for altering the Boundary between Counties.	
	Counties of the North and West Ridings of Yorkshire (Howgrave, &c.) Order 1895 Provisional Order made in pursuance of Section 54 of the Local Government Act 1888 for altering the Boundary between Counties.	
Local Government Board's Provisional Orders Confirmation (No. 15) Act 1895 Session 2 or the Local Government Board's Provisional Orders Confirmation (No. 15) Act 1895	59 Vict. Sess. 2. c. ix	5 September 1895
An Act to confirm certain Provisional Orders of the Local Government Board relating to Dover Fenton Greetland Hoddesdon Lancaster Leeds Leigh Swansea and West Ham (two).
	Dover Order 1895 Provisional Order for altering a Local Act. (Note: Dover Improvement Act 1830 (11 Geo. 4. c. cxvii))	
	Fenton Order 1895 Provisional Order for altering certain Local Acts.	
	Greetland Order 1895 Provisional Order to enable the Urban District Council of Greetland to put in force the Compulsory Clauses of the Lands Clauses Acts.	
	Hoddesdon Order 1895 Provisional Order for dissolving the Special Drainage District of Hoddesdon.	
	Lancaster Order 1895 Provisional Order for partially repealing and altering certain Local Acts and Confirming Acts.	
	Leeds Order 1895 Provisional Order for altering Local Acts and Confirming Acts.	
	Leigh Order (No. 2) 1895 Provisional Order for altering a Local Act (Note: Westleigh, Pennington and Bedford Local Boards (Gas) Act 1874 (37 & 38 Vict. c. lxxi)) and a Confirming Act. (Note: Local Government Board's Provisional Orders Confirmation (No. 11) Act 1888 (51 & 52 Vict. c. cxxxi))	
	Swansea Order 1895 Provisional Order for altering certain Local Acts.	
	West Ham Order 1895 Provisional Order to enable the Urban Sanitary Authority for the Borough of West Ham to put in force the Compulsory Clauses of the Lands Clauses Acts.	
	West Ham Order (No. 2) 1895 Provisional Order for altering certain Local Acts.	
Local Government Board's Provisional Orders Confirmation (No. 16) Act 1895 Session 2 or the Local Government Board's Provisional Orders Confirmation (No. 16) Act 1895	59 Vict. Sess. 2. c. x	5 September 1895
An Act to confirm certain Provisional Orders of the Local Government Board relating to Bournemouth Chichester Dover and Southampton.
	Borough of Bournemouth Order 1895 Provisional Order made in pursuance of Sections 54 and 59 of the Local Government Act 1888.	
	Chichester Order 1895 Provisional Order made in pursuance of Sections 54 and 59 of the Local Government Act 1888.	
	Borough of Dover (Extension) Order 1895 Provisional Order made in pursuance of Sections 54 and 59 of the Local Government Act 1888.	
	Southampton Order 1895 Provisional Order made in pursuance of Sections 54 and 59 of the Local Government Act 1888.	
Local Government Board's Provisional Orders Confirmation (No. 17) Act 1895 Session 2 or the Local Government Board's Provisional Orders Confirmation (No. 17) Act 1895	59 Vict. Sess. 2. c. xi	5 September 1895
An Act to confirm certain Provisional Orders of the Local Government Board relating to the Counties of Buckingham Cambridge Hertford and West Suffolk.
	County of Hertford (Nettleden, &c.) Order 1895 Provisional Order made in pursuance of Section 54 of the Local Government Act 1888 for altering the Boundary between Counties.	
	County of West Suffolk (Wood Ditton) Order 1895 Provisional Order made in pursuance of Section 54 of the Local Government Act 1888 for altering the Boundary between Counties.	
Local Government Board's Provisional Orders Confirmation (No. 18) Act 1895 Session 2 or the Local Government Board's Provisional Orders Confirmation (No. 18) Act 1895	59 Vict. Sess. 2. c. xii	5 September 1895
An Act to confirm certain Provisional Orders of the Local Government Board relating to Eastbourne and Nelson.
	Eastbourne Order 1895 Provisional Order for altering certain Local Acts.	
	Nelson Order 1895 Provisional Order for altering certain Local Acts.	
Local Government Board's Provisional Order Confirmation (No. 19) Act 1895 Session 2 or the Local Government Board's Provisional Order Confirmation (No. 19) Act 1895 (repealed)	59 Vict. Sess. 2. c. xiii	5 September 1895
An Act to confirm a Provisional Order of the Local Government Board relating to the City of Wakefield. (Repealed by West Yorkshire Act 1980 (c. xiv))
	City of Wakefield Order 1895 Provisional Order made in pursuance of Sections 54 and 59 of the Local Government Act 1888.	
Local Government Board's Provisional Order Confirmation (No. 20) Act 1895 Session 2 or the Local Government Board's Provisional Order Confirmation (No. 20) Act 1895 (repealed)	59 Vict. Sess. 2. c. xiv	5 September 1895
An Act to confirm a Provisional Order of the Local Government Board relating to Keighley. (Repealed by West Yorkshire Act 1980 (c. xiv))
	Borough of Keighley Order 1895 Provisional Order made in pursuance of Sections 54 and 59 of the Local Government Act 1888.	
Military Lands Provisional Order Confirmation (No. 2) Act 1895 Session 2 or the Military Lands Provisional Order Confirmation (No. 2) Act 1895 (repealed)	59 Vict. Sess. 2. c. xv	5 September 1895
An Act to confirm a Provisional Order of the Secretary of State under the Military Lands Act 1892. (Note: Military Lands Act 1892 (55 & 56 Vict. c. 43)) (Repealed by Statute Law (Repeals) Act 2008 (c. 12))
	Richmond Barracks Enlargement Order 1895 A Provisional Order made in pursuance of Section Two of the Military Lands Act 1892 authorising the purchase of land for the enlargement of Richmond Barracks in the county of Dublin.	

=== Sources ===
- The Public General Statutes, Volume 32: 58 & 59 and 59 Victoria – 1895. Law reports. Eyre and Spottiswoode – via HathiTrust.
- The Public General Statutes, Volume 32: 58 & 59 and 59 Victoria – 1895. Law reports. Eyre and Spottiswoode – via Google Books.
- Journal of the House of Commons. Vol. 150. London: His Majesty's Stationery Office. pp. 339–391.
- Chronological Table of and Index to the Statutes. Vol. 1: To the End of the Session 59 Vict. Sess. 2 (1895) (13th ed.). London: Her Majesty's Stationery Office. 1896. p. 539 – via Google Books.

== See also ==
- List of acts of the Parliament of the United Kingdom
