= Power Court Stadium =

Under construction football stadium in Luton, England

- Interactive map of Power Court Stadium
- Full name: Power Court Stadium
- Location: Power Court; Luton, Bedfordshire; LU1 3XL
- Coordinates: 51.879224°N 0.407760°W
- Owner: Luton Town
- Operator: Luton Town
- Capacity: 25,000
- Surface: Grass
- Public transit: Luton

Construction
- Groundbreaking: 2026
- Built: 2026–present
- Opened: 2028 (planned)
- Cost: £100m
- Architects: AECOM
- Builder: Capital Sky
- Project manager: Tom Moroney
- Structural engineer: AKT II
- Main contractor: Limak International

Power Court Stadium is a football stadium under construction in Luton, Bedfordshire, that will become the home ground for Luton Town ahead of the 2028–29 season, replacing Kenilworth Road, the club's home since 1905.

Power Court is the site of the former Luton power station, which closed in 1969. It is intended that the new stadium will be part of a new mixed-use development in the centre of Luton containing housing, a hotel and a music venue.

== History ==
Luton Town has played at their current ground, Kenilworth Road, since 1905 having been forced to find a ground at short notice following the sale of their previous Dunstable Road home in which the club played between 1897 and 1905. The club had sought to move away from Kenilworth Road from 1955, the year it won promotion to the First Division for the first time. At that point, the ground was considered small compared to those of their contemporary First and Second Division clubs, and its location along a main road and train line made significant redevelopment difficult.

The club made several attempts to relocate. Leaving Luton for the nearby new town of Milton Keynes in Buckinghamshire was unsuccessfully proposed several times, most notably in the 1980s. Since 1989, Kenilworth Road has been owned by Luton Borough Council, who leases the ground back to the club. A planning application for a new 20,000-seater indoor stadium, the "Kohlerdome" proposed by chairman David Kohler in 1995, was turned down by the Secretary of State in 1998, and Kohler left soon after. In 2007, the club's then-owners proposed a controversial plan to relocate to a site near Junction 12 of the M1 motorway, near the Bedfordshire villages of Harlington and Toddington. A planning application was made on the club's behalf by former chairman Cliff Bassett, but the application was withdrawn almost immediately following the club's takeover in 2008. In 2009, the club began an independent feasibility study to determine a viable location to move to.

The club did not rule out redeveloping Kenilworth Road and, in October 2012, entered talks to buy the stadium back from Luton Borough Council. By 2015, these plans had been dropped in favour of a move to a new location, with managing director Gary Sweet confirming that the club was in a position to "buy land, secure the best possible professional advice... and to see the [planning] application process through to the receipt of consent".

== Planning ==
In April 2016, the club announced its intention to build and move into a 17,500-capacity stadium on the Power Court site in central Luton, the former site of Luton power station which operated between 1901 and 1969. Outline planning permission for this ground, with potential to expand to 23,000 seats, was granted by Luton Borough Council on 16 January 2019. In March 2021, the club announced that it intended to make a number of changes to the initial scheme to reflect changes caused by the COVID-19 pandemic, but that the capacity of the new stadium was still to be 23,000 and had a target opening date of 2024. This plan was revised in 2023, to delivering the first phase, a 19,500-capacity stadium by 2026, followed by the second phase which planned to see a further 4,000 safe standing seats added at a later date.

On 13 September 2024, the club submitted revised plans to Luton Borough Council for a 25,000-capacity stadium and at the time, planned for the stadium to open in time for the 2027–28 season. These plans were eventually approved on 16 December 2024.

On 30 April 2025, the club announced that Turkish contractor Limak International had joined the project. The firm is currently redeveloping Camp Nou, the home of FC Barcelona. Construction was expected to begin during the summer of 2025 with the new facility expected to hold its first competitive game at the start of the 2028–29 season retaining the planned capacity of 25,000. The club also stated Limak's involvement in constructing Power Court would ensure it is one of the most environmentally sustainable stadiums in the UK.

== Construction ==
In January 2026, piling began onsite following 18 months of groundwork. Construction of the superstructure began in June 2026.

In November 2026, the club told supporters that the construction cost of the new stadium had increased by £15m, partly due to increased oil, steel and concrete prices, and the programme was a month behind schedule, mainly due to an uncharted Victorian sewer. Limak was now a "specialist adviser" overseenig local contractor Capital Sky. The target date for completion was June 2028.

== Proposed features ==
The stadium's four stands will be of varying height in a homage to Kenilworth Road.

A distinctive feature of the new stadium is the 'halo' floodlighting system which will be suspended above the pitch and is inspired by the straw boater hats historically manufactured in Luton.
