= Carlisle power stations =

Power stations in the United Kingdom

- Country: United Kingdom
- Location: Carlisle Cumbria
- Coordinates: 54°54′01″N 02°57′32″W
- Status: Decommissioned and Demolished
- Construction began: 1897, 1921
- Commission date: 1899, 1923
- Decommission date: 1927, 1980
- Owners: Carlisle Corporation (1899–1948); British Electricity Authority (1948–1955); Central Electricity Authority (1955–1957); Central Electricity Generating Board (1958–1980)
- Operator: As owner

Thermal power station
- Primary fuel: Coal
- Turbine technology: Reciprocating steam engines and steam turbines
- Chimneys: 1 (each station)
- Cooling source: River water

Power generation
- Units operational: See text
- Make and model: See text
- Nameplate capacity: 5.25 MW (1923), 86.9 MW (1958)
- Annual net output: 7,134 MWh (1923), 368,600 MWh (1954)

Carlisle power stations were two electricity generating stations that supplied electricity to Carlisle and the surrounding area from 1899 until 1980. The first power station (1899–1927) was in the centre of the city near Nelson Bridge, and the second larger station was at Willow Holme North-West of the city (1923–1980).

== Background ==
Carlisle Corporation sought, and obtained, from the Board of Trade a provisional order to generate and supply electricity to the City of Carlisle in 1895. The Carlisle Corporation Electric Lighting Order 1895} was confirmed by Parliament in the Electric Lighting Orders Confirmation (No. 3) Act 1895 (58 & 59 Vict. c. lxviii). An electric lighting scheme for the city was designed by Sir Alexander Kennedy and construction of the power station started in 1897.

== James Street station ==
The power station was built by J. W. Laing in James Street at the junction with Nelson Bridge or Victoria Viaduct (54°53′24.7″N 2°56′09.6″W). The station shared coaling facilities with the adjacent gas works immediately to the north. Water for the power station's condensers was abstracted from, and returned to, the adjacent River Caldew. The station had a single brick chimney and first produced electricity in 1899. In about 1910 the building was extended to the rear. The original generating plant was fed from three Oldham Boiler Company Lancashire Boilers providing steam to four Willans engines driving two each Wiliiams-Siemens 60 kW and 125-kW dynamos.

Extensions were made to the plant from time to time as the demand increased, up to 1919, when a 2,000-kW turbo-alternator was installed by the British Thomson-Houston Co.

=== Specification ===
In 1923, towards the end of its working life, the plant installed at the James Street power station comprised coal-fired boilers producing 87,500 lb/hr (11.02 kg/s) of steam which fed the following generating plant:

- 1 × 1,250 kW turbo-alternator generating AC
- 1 × 2,000 kW turbo-alternator generating AC
- 3 × 500 kW reciprocating engine generating DC
- 2 × 250 kW reciprocating engine generating DC

The total installed generating capacity was 5.25 MW.

=== Operation ===
Electricity was supplied to customers at 230 & 400 Volt 3-phase 50 Hz AC; 230 & 460 Volt DC; and 520/540 Volt DC for traction current. Electricity was initially used for lighting, replacing gas lamps, but other uses were soon developed.

The City of Carlisle Electric Tramways Co Ltd commissioned the tram system in 1900 taking power from the James Street power station. The tram system operated across the city until it closed in 1931.

In 1923 the power station sold 7,133.9 MWh of electricity. This was distributed to the following users:

Electricity supplies from Carlisle power station 1923
User	Current supplied MWh
Lighting and domestic supplies	1,286.8
Public lighting	74.9
Traction	361.11
Power	5,411.1
Bulk supplies	–
Total	7,133.9

The maximum electrical load on the system in 1923 was 3,983 kW and there was a connected load of 11,552 kW. The revenue from the sale of current amounted to £55,039. The surplus of revenue over expenses for the corporation was £23,987.

=== Closure and aftermath ===
The constrained James Street site was too small for new larger generating plant to meet the increasing demand for electricity following the First World War. In the decade following the War the national consumption of electricity more than doubled from 3,577.7 GWh in 1919 to 8,746 GWh in 1929. A new power station was built at Willow Holme. The James Street station was closed in 1927. The electricity equipment was removed soon after and the chimney demolished. The building was used as stores, a maintenance depot and offices. An extension was built in 1937 in 'Moderne' style to make more office space and the building was used by the electricity undertaking and later by NORWEB – the area electricity board – until 1987.

The building then became the Carlisle Enterprise Centre. Formal 'listing' of the building as of special architectural or historic interest was rejected in 2015. The grounds for rejection were the building had undergone significant change; the generating equipment had been removed; and there was a lack of architectural interest in the functional eclectic nature of the buildings.

== Willow Holme station ==
To cater for the increase in demand for electricity following the First World War a large modern power station was built at Willow Holme, or Willowholme (54°54'01.1"N 2°57'31.7"W) on the River Eden West of the municipal sewage works. The first installation being two turboalternators of 2.4 MW and 3.6 MW capacity in 1927 and 1928 these having been removed from the original station site at James Street. Extensions were carried out in 1927 and 1930, comprising a 7.2 MW and a 15 MW turbo-alternator of B.T.H. manufacture together with Stirling boilers one of 25,000 lb/hr and seven of 30,000 lb/hr. As part of the Second World War programme to increase generating plant in North West England capacity directions were issued in May 1940 by the Central Electricity Board to increase output from 26,150 kW to 86,150 kW. Consisting of two 30 MW B.T.H. turboalternators generating at 11 kV, connected to the 33 kV busbars by generator transformers were commissioned in 1943 and 1944,. The steam raising plant consists of five Stirling boilers, rated at 150 klb/hr with chain grate stokers.

=== Specification ===
The plant at Willow Holme comprised:

- Coal-fired boilers:
  - 1 x 25,000 lb/h (3.15 kg/s) Stirling boiler, operating at 265 psi, 650 °F (18.3 bar, 343 °C)
  - 1 x 24,000 lb/h (3.02 kg/s) Stirling boiler, operating at 265 psi, 650 °F (18.3 bar, 343 °C)
  - 4 x 19,000 lb/h (2.39 kg/s) Stirling boilers, operating at 265 psi, 650 °F (18.3 bar, 343 °C)
  - 5 x 150,000 lb/h (18.9 kg/s) Stirling boilers, operating at 625 psi, 840 °F (43.1 bar, 449 °C)

The total evaporative capacity of the boilers was 875,000 lb/h (110.2 kg/s).

Cooling water for the condensers was abstracted from, and returned to, the River Eden.

The generating plant comprised:

- 2 × 30 MW British Thomson-Houston turbo-alternators
- 1 × 15 MW British Thomson-Houston turbo-alternator
- 1 × 7.2 MW British Thomson-Houston turbo-alternator
- 1 × 3.6 MW British Thomson-Houston turbo-alternator
- 1 × 350 kW British Thomson-Houston turbo-alternator house set
- 1 × 750 kW British Thomson-Houston turbo-alternator house set

The station had an installed capacity of 86.9 MW and an output capacity of 69 MW.

=== Government electricity policy ===
Under the terms of the Electricity (Supply) Act 1926 the Central Electricity Board (CEB) was established. The CEB identified high efficiency 'selected' power station that would supply electricity most effectively; Carlisle became a selected station. The CEB also constructed the National Grid (1927–33) to connect power stations within a region. Carlisle was a node on the major north–south line from Kilmarnock in Scotland to Carlisle, Lancaster, Stoke-on-Trent, Bristol and Hayle Cornwall. The connection in Carlisle was at a 132 kV grid substation that was built immediately West of Willow Holme power station. The substation also distributed electricity at 33 kV. When the electricity supergrid was being built in the 1960s the Carlisle substation was connected via a 132 kV line to the 400/275 kV substation at Harker, north of Carlisle.

Upon nationalisation of the British electricity supply industry in 1948 under the provisions of the Electricity Act 1947 the Carlisle undertaking was abolished, ownership of Carlisle power station was vested in the British Electricity Authority, and subsequently the Central Electricity Authority and the Central Electricity Generating Board (CEGB). At the same time the electricity distribution and sales responsibilities of the Carlisle electricity undertaking were transferred to the North Western Electricity Board (NORWEB).

=== Operations ===
Operating data for Willow Holme power station was as follows:

Operation of Carlisle power station, 1946–80
Year	Running hours (or Load factor %)	Output capacity MW	Electricity supplied GWh	Thermal Efficiency percent
Low Pressure (LP) station
1954	6815	19	67.25	15.39
1955	2903	19	27.42	13.00
1956	2378	19	18.58	12.35
1957	823	14	6.30	10.52
1958	675	14	4.11	7.46
High Pressure (HP) station
1954	8680	57	301.35	23.74
1955	8568	57	291.41	23.13
1956	7009	57	174.06	23.21
1957	7958	57	274.10	24.20
1958	6902	57	190.03	22.87
Combined output
1946	(50.9 %)		357.5	2.61
1961	(20.6 %)	69	124.21	21.39
1962	(12.4 %)	69	74.94	18.63
1963	(24.11 %)	71	145.74	21.89
1967	(28.4 %)	71	176.385	21.73
1972	(17.1 %)	77.75	100.40	20.08
1979	(7.7 %)	62.75	39.87	17.65

With its low thermal efficiency the low pressure (LP) station was used less often (see table) and was decommissioned in 1959–60. By 1971 only two of the HP generating sets were operational (1 × 30 MW and 1 × 32 MW).

=== Closure ===
By 1980 several new efficient power stations were coming online and the CEGB decommissioned older and less efficient power stations. Carlisle power station was among five stations closed on 27 October 1980. The power station was demolished in about 1988. The adjacent 132 kV substation is extant and supplies electricity to Carlisle from the National Grid.

== See also ==
- Timeline of the UK electricity supply industry
- List of power stations in England
