= Kenilworth Road =

Football stadium in Luton, Bedfordshire, England

- The Kenny
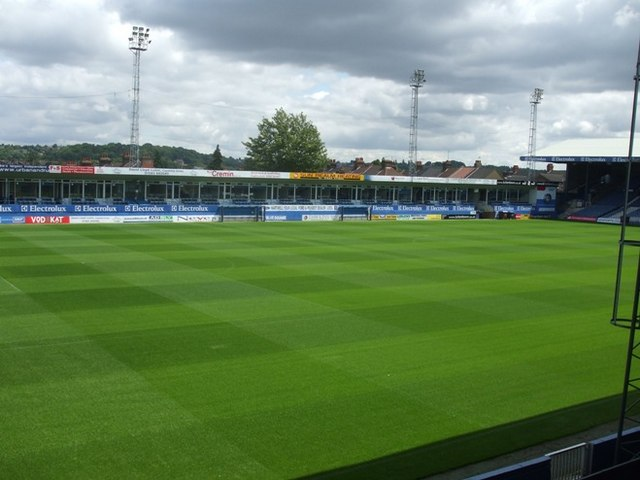
- The pitch at the Kenilworth Road Stadium
- Interactive map of Kenilworth Road
- Full name: Kenilworth Road Stadium
- Location: 1 Maple Road East; Bury Park; Luton LU4 8AW; Bedfordshire; England
- Coordinates: 51°53′03″N 0°25′54″W
- Owner: Luton Borough Council
- Operator: Luton Town F.C.
- Capacity: 12,056
- Surface: Grass
- Record attendance: 30,069 v Blackpool (4 March 1959, FA Cup)
- Field size: 110 by 72 yards (100.6 m × 65.8 m)
- Public transit: Luton

Construction
- Built: 1905
- Opened: 1905
- Renovated: 2023–present
- Closed: 2028 (planned)

Tenant
- Luton Town F.C. (1905–present)

Kenilworth Road, also known as the Kenny, is a football stadium in the area of Bury Park, Luton, Bedfordshire, England. It has been the home ground of Luton Town Football Club since 1905. The stadium has also hosted women's and youth international matches, including the second leg of the 1984 European Competition for Women's Football final.

The 12,000 all-seater stadium is situated in the district of Bury Park, one mile (1.6 km) west of the centre of Luton. It is named after the road which runs along one end of it, though its official address is 1 Maple Road. Kenilworth Road hosted football in the Southern League until 1920, then in the Football League until 2009, when Luton were relegated to the Conference Premier. It has hosted Football League matches once more since 2014. With Luton Town's promotion to the Premier League in 2023, the first Premier League game at Kenilworth Road was against West Ham United in September 2023.

Floodlights were fitted in 1953, and the ground became all-seated in 1991. The record attendance of 30,069 was set in 1959, in an FA Cup sixth round replay against Blackpool. The ground is known for the unusual entrance to the Oak Road End, and the five-season ban on away supporters that Luton Town imposed following a riot by visiting fans in 1985.

== History ==
Luton Town moved to Kenilworth Road in 1905, leaving their previous home at Dunstable Road after their landlord sold the site for housing at short notice. The club's directors quickly procured a new site, and the club's first match at the new ground came on 4 September 1905, a 0–0 draw against Plymouth Argyle. Watford player C. Barnes scored the first ever goal at the stadium, in a reserve match. Originally known as Ivy Road, the new ground brought success with it, in their last season at Dunstable Road, Luton had finished second from bottom, but in their first at Kenilworth Road, Luton finished fourth in the Southern League.

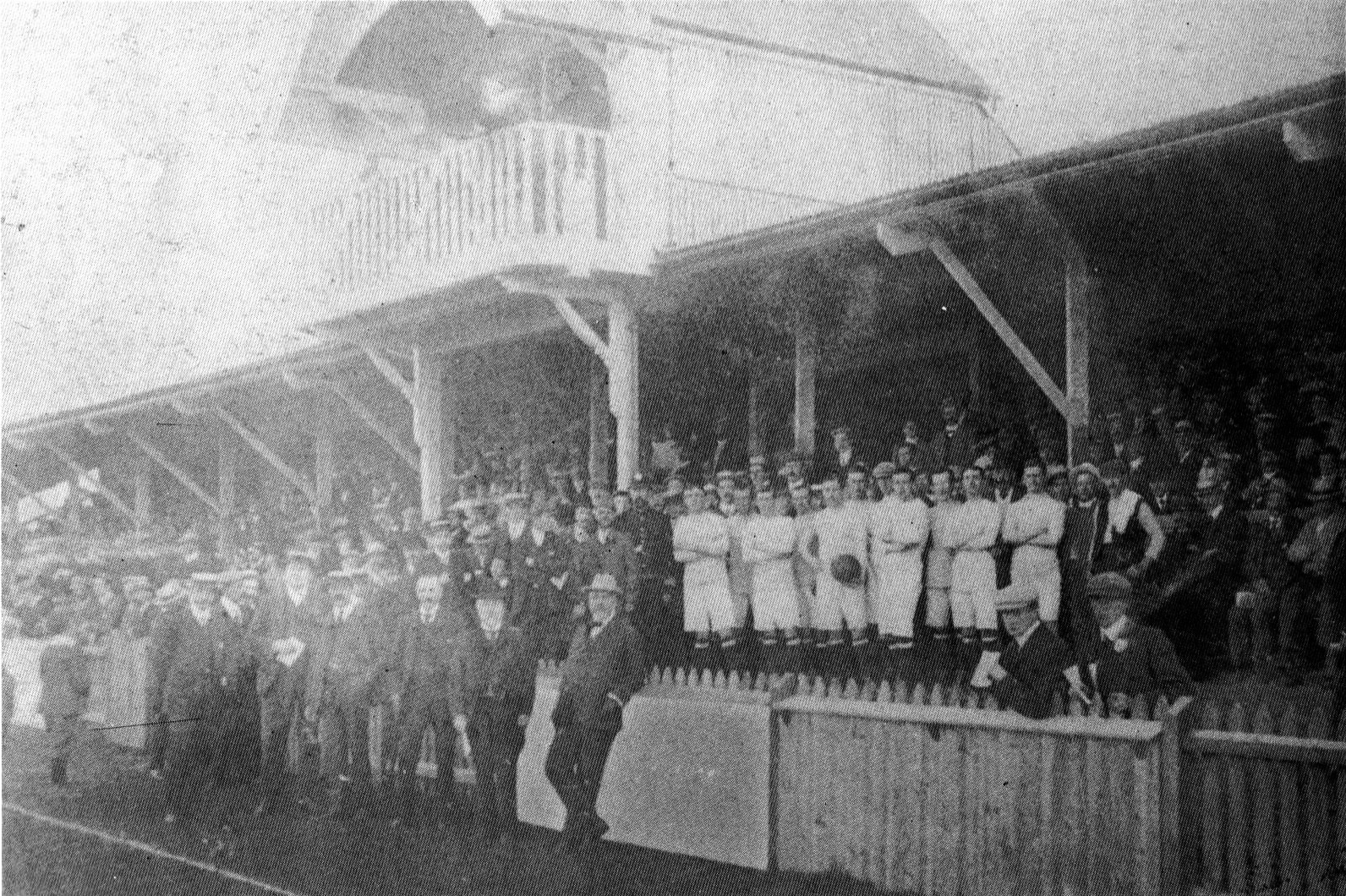
Kenilworth Road was opened in 1905

The ground has undergone several major changes since its original construction in 1905. The original Main Stand, boasting a press loft and a balcony above the roof, burnt down in 1921, and was replaced by the current stand before the 1922–23 campaign. The new Main Stand was split into two: the upper tier contained wooden seats, so there was a ban on smoking in the stand; the lower tier, which became known as the Enclosure, was terracing.

When attendances were first counted, in the 1932–33 season, Luton Town's average home attendance was taken at 5,868. Kenilworth Road's capacity of the time was 25,000, so it was not deemed necessary to improve the ground. However, only three years later, on 25 April 1936, a match against Coventry City attracted 23,142 spectators—at that time a club record. The decision was taken to renovate the stadium, already in disrepair, and work began at the end of the following season. The Kenilworth End terrace was extended, the Oak Road End received a roof and major work was done on the Main Stand. Following these steps, the ground was more in line with those of rival clubs, the capacity standing at 30,000.

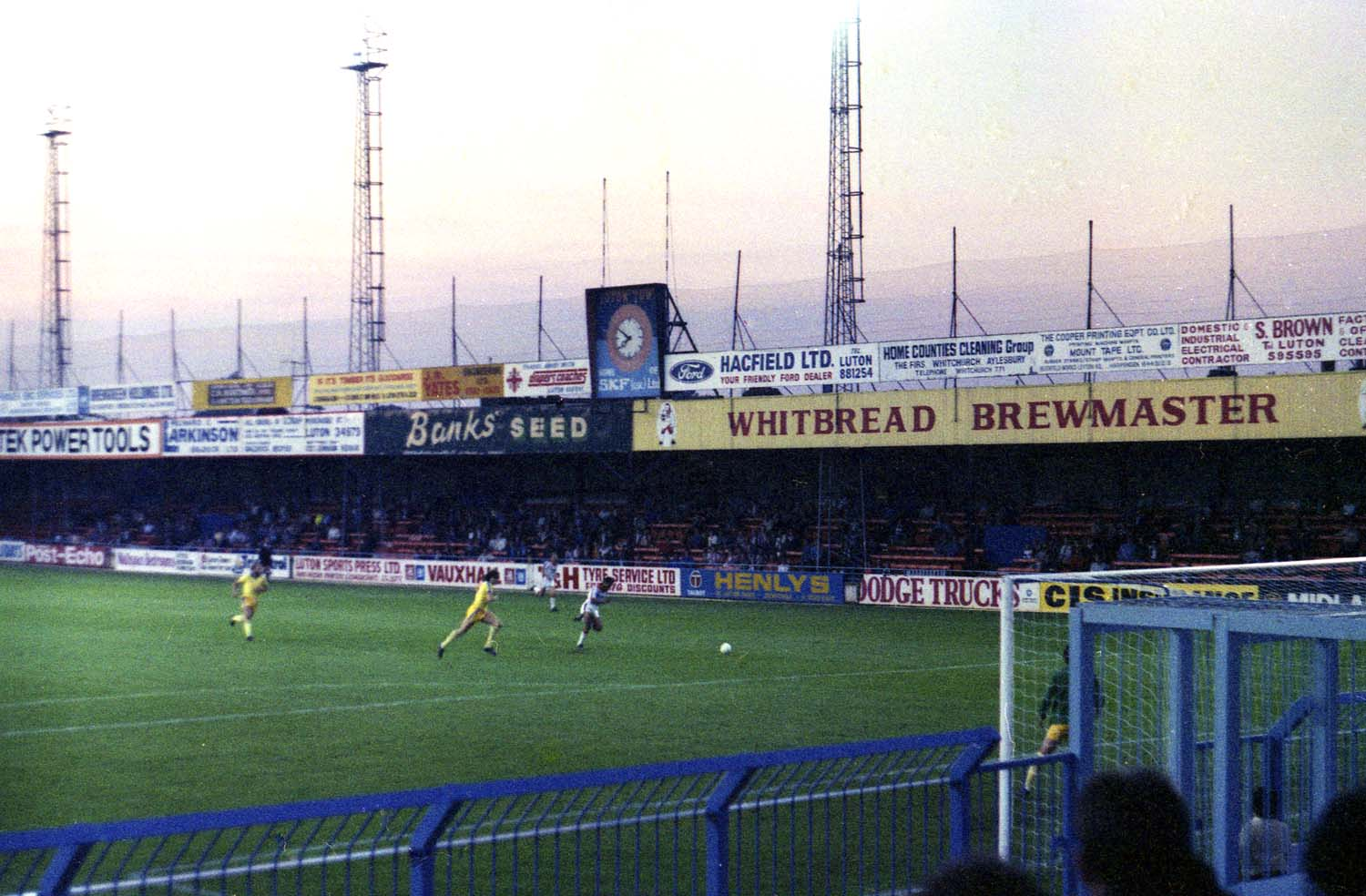
The Bobbers Stand in 1980; six years later this was replaced by executive boxes

The first ten years following Kenilworth Road's renovation saw average attendances of between 15,000 and 18,000; a huge improvement on what the club had previously been able to attract. Floodlights were installed at the ground before the 1953–54 season, and used for the first time in a friendly against Turkish side Fenerbahçe on 7 October 1953. The Oak Road terrace was extended in 1955, and promotion to the First Division for 1955–56 saw the average attendance climb as high as 21,454.

Renovation of Kenilworth Road was neglected for the next two decades—financial difficulties and the club's ambitions to build a new ground meant that regeneration was unaffordable, and would also prove unnecessary should relocation occur. However, following the rejection of several potential sites for a new ground, the club finally turned their attentions back to the maintenance of Kenilworth Road. The first real modernisation of the ground came in 1973, with the first addition of seats at the stadium since the construction of the new Main Stand in 1922. The Bobbers Stand became all-seated, while the rest of the ground remained terracing. The new look stand could hold only 1,539 seats, and as a result the capacity of the ground dropped to 22,601.

A £1 million refurbishment got underway in 1985 with the introduction of an artificial turf playing surface, as well as the conversion of the ground to become all-seated, which began a year later in 1986. The Oak Road End terrace was filled with seats, while the Bobbers Stand had its seats ripped out to be replaced with executive boxes. The Main Stand's terraced enclosure received seats, and work also began on converting the Kenilworth Stand, which had a roof added to it at this time and would also receive seats in stages over the coming years.

The David Preece Stand was erected in 1991, simply called the New Stand on construction. The most recent improvements to the ground came in 2005, when the conversion of the Kenilworth Stand was finally completed to bring the capacity to 10,356.

On 24 March 2015 the ground was officially renamed "The Prostate Cancer UK Stadium" for one day, for the game against Wycombe Wanderers, in support of charity and raising awareness of prostate cancer.

=== Artificial pitch ===
In 1985, following the lead of Queen Park Rangers' experiment at Loftus Road four years earlier, the grass pitch was dug up and replaced with an artificial playing surface. The surface, called Sporturf Professional, was manufactured by En-Tout-Cas, and cost the club £350,000. The first match on the new pitch resulted in a 1–1 draw with Nottingham Forest. The new surface quickly became unpopular with both players and fans, and was derided as "the plastic pitch". Protests about the quality of the pitch from other teams resulted in a meeting with a number of major clubs in 1989, mediated by a Football League Commission. The Commission concluded that the pitch had suffered excessive wear and tear from too much use, and Luton installed a replacement artificial surface, at a cost of £60,000, during the summer of 1989. The second artificial pitch was itself removed during the summer of 1991, following the banning of such surfaces by The Football League, and the club returned to a natural grass surface.

=== Away fan ban ===
On 13 March 1985, Millwall visited Kenilworth Road for an FA Cup sixth round match. After only 14 minutes the match was halted as the visiting fans began to riot. The referee took both teams off for 25 minutes, before bringing them back on to complete the match. Following the final whistle, and a 1–0 victory for Luton, another pitch invasion and subsequent riot by away supporters caused noticeable damage to the ground and the surrounding area. Many of those arrested turned out to be supporters of teams other than Millwall. The club's chairman, David Evans, reacted by imposing a ban on all away supporters from Kenilworth Road from the start of the 1986–87 season as well as introducing a scheme that would require even home supporters to carry membership cards to be admitted to matches. The Football League insisted that Luton relax the ban for League Cup matches, but when Evans refused to allow Cardiff City fans to visit Kenilworth Road for their second round tie, the club were thrown out of the competition. The ban continued for four seasons, with exceptions for cup matches, before Luton Town repealed the ban before the 1990–91 season.

=== Ownership ===
The ground was first constructed in 1905, soon before the club moved in. The club rented the ground until 1933, when newly appointed chairman Charles Jeyes organised the purchase of the stadium. The club retained ownership of the ground until February 1989, when the freehold was sold to Luton Borough Council for £3.25 million. The club was granted a seven-year lease at peppercorn rent for its continued use. This arrangement has been extended several times, and is due to end in 2028 when the club moves to their new stadium at Power Court.

== Structure and facilities ==
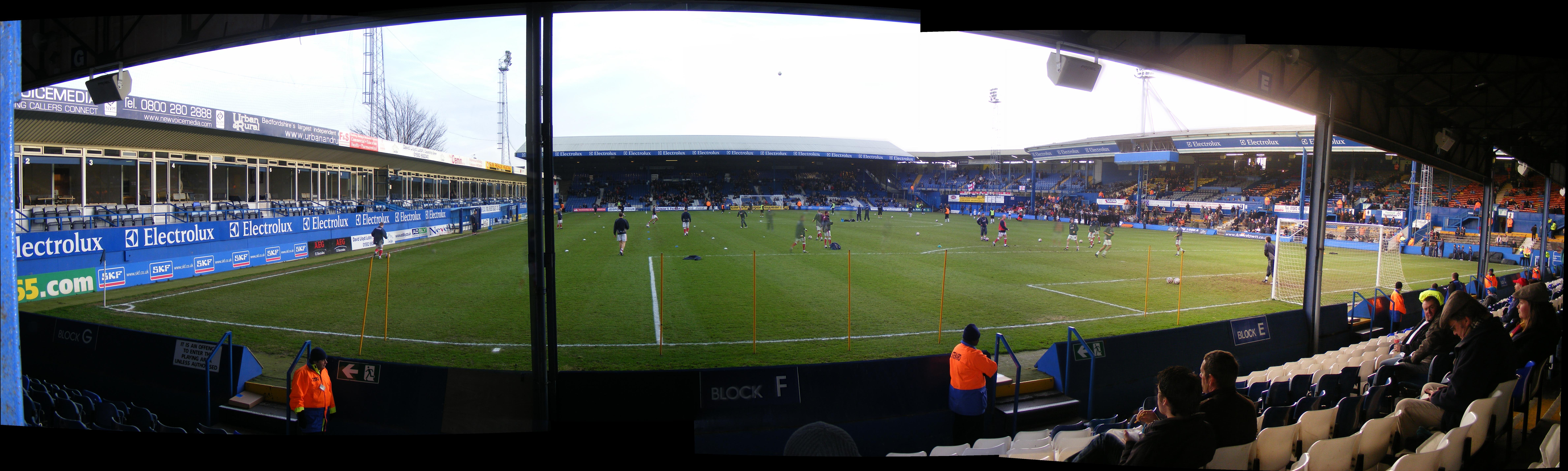
View from the Oak Road End in 2008, with the Executive Boxes to the left, Kenilworth Stand opposite and the Preece and Main Stands to the right

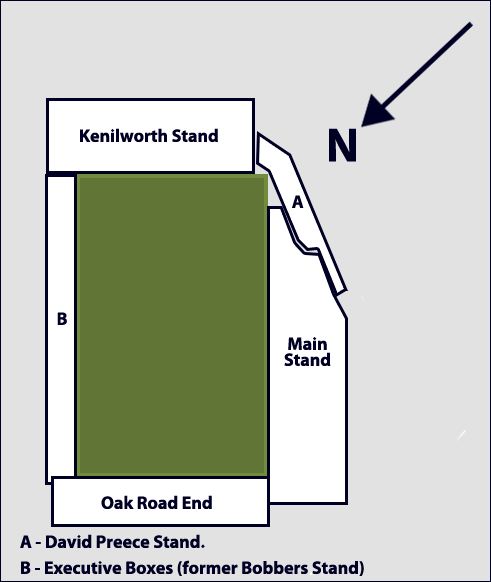
Plan of the stadium A–Preece Stand; B–Boxes

The ground is made up of five stands—opposite the eponymous Kenilworth Stand is the Oak Road End, and to the left is the Main Stand, which is flanked to its right by the David Preece Stand. Opposite them is the Bobbers Stand.

The Main Stand covers approximately two-thirds of the length of the pitch, though the attached enclosure is longer, covering the whole distance. The Main Stand, which seats 4,277 fans, also contains the dressing rooms, club offices and television gantry, as well as a number of supporting pillars, a car park and the Nick Owen and Eric Morecambe suites. To the Main Stand's right, in the corner above the end of the enclosure and next to the Kenilworth Stand, is the David Preece Stand, a family area which seats 711 spectators. The David Preece Stand acquired its present name in 2008, a year after the former player's death.

Opposite the Main and Preece Stands is the Bobbers Stand. In 1986, the original Bobbers was rebuilt, with the seats removed and replaced with 25 executive boxes. However, upon the club's promotion to the Premier League in 2023, Kenilworth Road required significant upgrades to meet the league's minimum requirements. One of the major pieces of work was the construction of a new Bobbers Stand containing around 1,000 seats.

To the right of the Main Stand is the 3,229-seater Kenilworth Stand, which backs onto Kenilworth Road. The Club Shop is behind this stand, which was once an open terrace but is now a roofed all-seater stand. In the corner between the Kenilworth Stand and the boxes is the stadium clock.

Opposite the Kenilworth Stand is the Oak Road End, which bears an electronic scoreboard on its roof and can seat a maximum of 1,800 fans. Originally a home section, the Oak Road End was turned into a stand for away fans only at the start of the 1991–92 season. Early in the 2013–14 season, the Oak Road End was re-opened for home supporters for fixtures where visiting support was predicted to be especially low, with the section for away fans moved to A Block of the Kenilworth Stand for these games. Later that season, it was announced that the stand was available for shared use between both home and away supporters, increasing Kenilworth Road's home capacity by 15%. The Oak Road End has an entrance that is often considered unusual, requiring spectators to go through an entrance built into the row of houses and up stairs to the stand.

== Moving and redevelopment plans ==
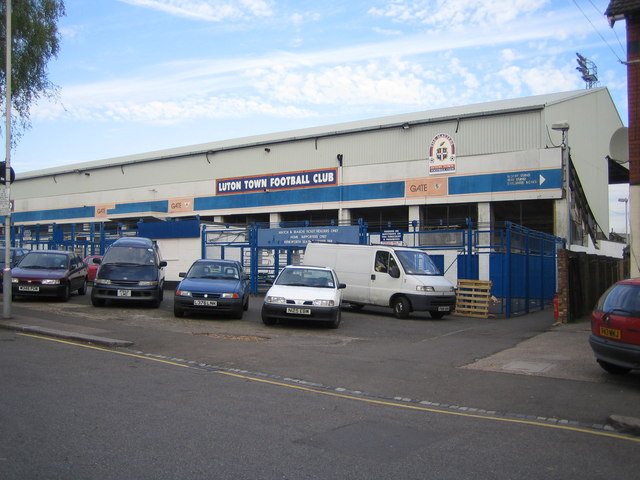
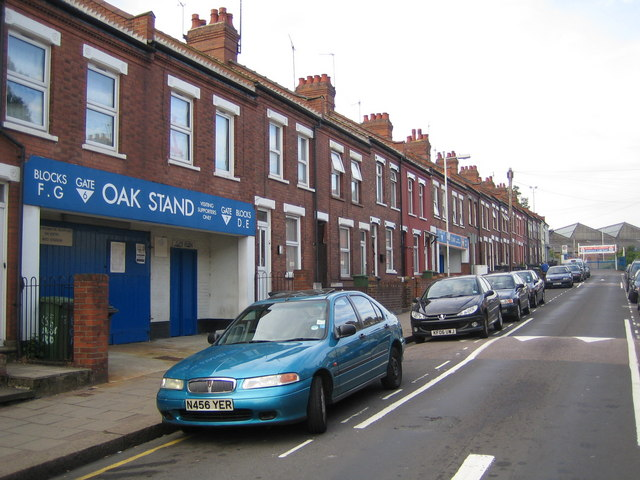
Entrances to the Kenilworth Stand and the Oak Road End, seen in 2006. The latter entrance, built into a row of houses, is often considered unusual

Luton Town have been looking for a new ground since 1955, when club chairman Percy Mitchell spoke of building a stadium "to hold 35,000 in comfort ... [and] get a lot of support which goes to London at the moment". However, due to unstable finances and an inability to find a site, no ground was built. The club proposed a move to Milton Keynes in 1982, according to The Luton News, to play as "MK Hatters" in an indoor "super-stadium". This move was approved by the Football League in 1983 but was prevented by vehement protests in Luton, where supporters against such a move marched through the town to display their feelings. Despite consistent fan opposition to the idea, relocation up the M1 motorway to the new town was raised several more times over the next two decades; for example, the Football League later refused Luton permission to move to Milton Keynes in 2000, saying that a member club was not allowed to leave its home town. Wimbledon F.C. was granted permission to relocate there in 2002, did so a year later and became Milton Keynes Dons in 2004.

The first time Luton managed to get as far as a planning application for a new ground was when chairman David Kohler's Kohlerdome was proposed in 1995. The Kohlerdome was envisioned by Kohler as a 20,000 all-seater indoor arena with a retractable roof and pitch, hosting 85 capacity events each year. Kohler's plans, though ambitious, were perhaps not very realistic, and the plans were turned down by the Secretary of State in 1998, with the reason given that the ground was not feasible unless the M1 motorway was widened. Kohler put the club on the market upon the plan's rejection and after a period under Cliff Bassett, the club came under the control of Mike Watson-Challis in 2000. Watson-Challis bought 55 acres (22 ha) of land by Junction 10 of the M1 in 2001, intending to move the club there, but once again, nothing came of the scheme. In 2007, Jayten Stadium Limited were hoping to relocate the club to a new purpose built stadium at Junction 12, near Harlington and Toddington. This plan was very unpopular with both Luton Town supporters and the local authorities, but a planning application was still submitted by former chairman Bassett on the club's behalf. The application was withdrawn by the club almost immediately after the takeover by Nick Owen's Luton Town Football Club 2020 consortium in 2008.

By 2012, the club was undertaking an independent feasibility study to determine a viable location to move to. Sites mooted included a ground built as part of a new housing development to the west of Luton and a site by the proposed Junction 11A of the M1, which was the preferred site of the local authorities. Luton Town did not rule out staying at a redeveloped Kenilworth Road, entering talks to buy the stadium back from Luton Borough Council in October 2012, but by mid-2015 these plans had been dropped in favour of a move to a new location. Managing director Gary Sweet confirmed that the club was in a position to "buy land, secure the best possible professional advice ... and to see the [planning] application process through to the receipt of consent." The club announced its new preferred location in 2015, Power Court in central Luton, near the shopping centre and St Mary's Church, for a 17,500-seater stadium.

Planning permission for an expanded stadium, with a capacity of 25,000, was granted by Luton Borough Council on 16 December 2024. Construction began in early 2025 and is expected to open for the 2028–29 season.

=== 2023–24 redevelopment ===
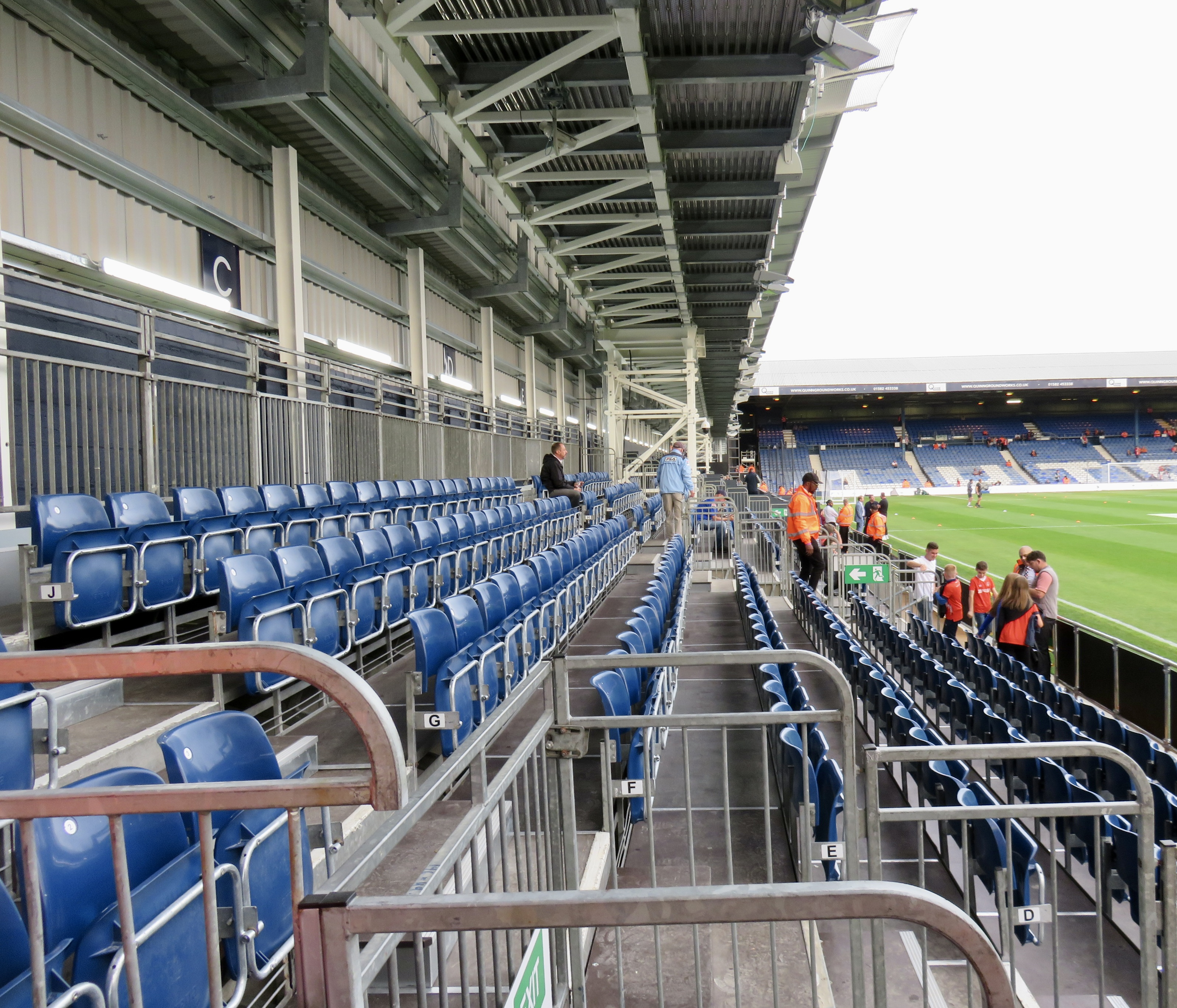
Internal view of the Bobbers Stand following redevelopment

Following the club's promotion, for the first time to the Premier League in May 2023, they embarked on a £13m work programme to completely demolish the executive boxes in the Bobbers Stand to construct a new stand to meet broadcast and media requirements in readiness for the 2023–24 season. To meet Premier League criteria the club had 13 weeks to accomplish this programme of works. On 14 July 2023, the club announced that there was uncertainty that this would be completed in time for their planned first home fixture of the season, against Burnley on 19 August and consequently this match was postponed. On 25 July, Luton Borough Council agreed to pay £200,000 towards upgrading CCTV, construction and widening of steps at Beech End road near the Bobbers Stand. Following redevelopment of the Bobbers Stand, the club announced that their EFL Cup game against Gillingham on 29 August 2023 would be a test event to ensure safety compliance for the stand before their first Premier League game, against West Ham United on 1 September. The stand would operate at 75% capacity with tickets distributed for free to displaced hospitality guests. The first full operation of the stand, for a Premier League game was on 1 September as Luton lost 2–1 to West Ham.

On 1 March 2024, work was completed on the installation of safe standing in the Oak Road stand which increased the stadium's capacity by 800. The club plans to install additional safe standing in the Enclosure.

== Other uses ==
Kenilworth Road has been used occasionally by the England women's team. The inaugural UEFA Women's Championship in 1984 saw Kenilworth Road play host to the second leg of the Final against Sweden, won by Sweden on penalties. The most recent use of the stadium by the women's team was a 4–2 victory over Spain on 22 March 2001. Kenilworth Road has been used by England's under-17 team since the 1970s, most recently in a 3–0 win over their Italian counterparts in the 2007 FA International Tournament Final.

The ground is home to the Hatters Study Support Centre, which provides local school pupils with ICT equipment, football training and lessons in numeracy and literacy. Kenilworth Road also hosts a number of local tournaments and events, including an annual youth competition organised by London Luton Airport.

On 23 March 2024, Hashtag United F.C. Women defeated Newcastle United W.F.C. 2–1 at Kenilworth Road in the FA Women's National League Cup final.

== Records ==
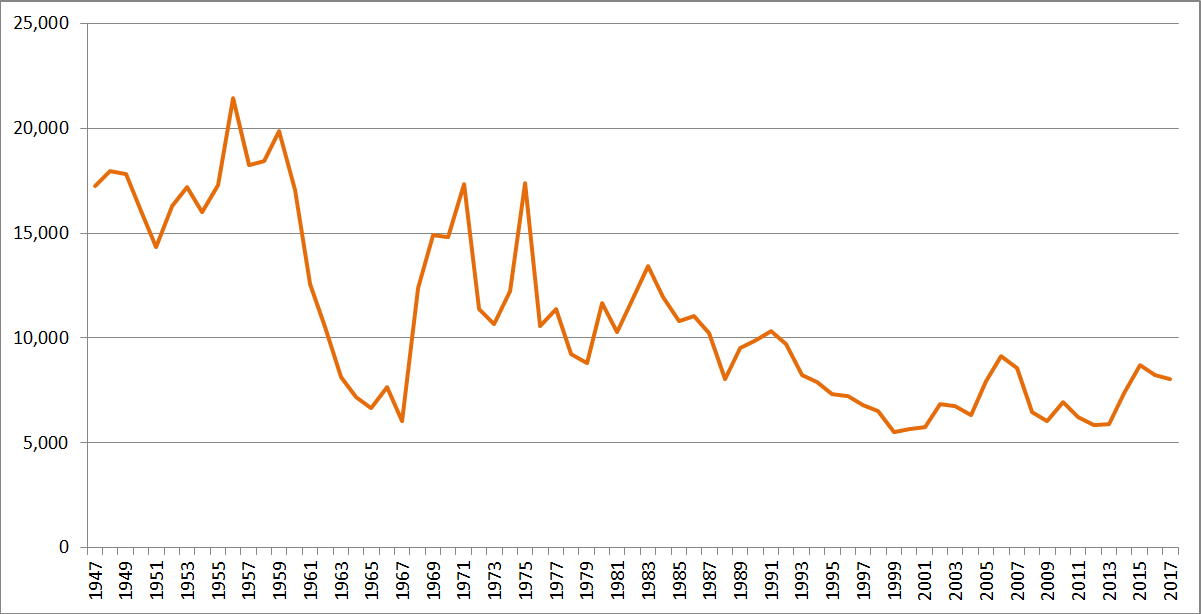
Average home league attendances at Kenilworth Road since 1946–47

The highest attendance record at this stadium was 30,069 against Blackpool in the FA Cup on 4 March 1959. The highest attendance in the Football League was 27,911 against Wolverhampton Wanderers in Division One on 5 November 1955.

The highest seasonal average for Luton at Kenilworth Road was 21,455 in the 1955–56 season. Luton's lowest seasonal average was 5,527 in 1998–99. The most recent season in which the average attendance was more than 10,000 was in the 2025–26 season, when the seasonal average was 11,024.

== Transport ==
The ground is located about half a mile away from Luton railway station, which lies on the Midland Main Line. Thameslink operate trains north to Bedford and south via London St Pancras to Brighton and Rainham. East Midlands Railway operate trains north to Corby and south to London St Pancras, as well as a limited service north to Nottingham and Sheffield.

Many of the roads near the ground are for residential permit holders only, meaning car parking at the ground is notoriously difficult. The club offers discounted parking for ticket holders at the car park next to the Power Court construction site in the town centre.

The number 1, 27, 28 and 32 buses, which are operated by Arriva and run every ten minutes from outside the railway station, stop at the junction of Oak Road and Dunstable Road. The Luton to Dunstable Busway includes a stop behind the Main Stand on Clifton Road, with routes running to Luton Airport, Dunstable, Houghton Regis, Leighton Buzzard and Milton Keynes.
