= List of places in Luton =

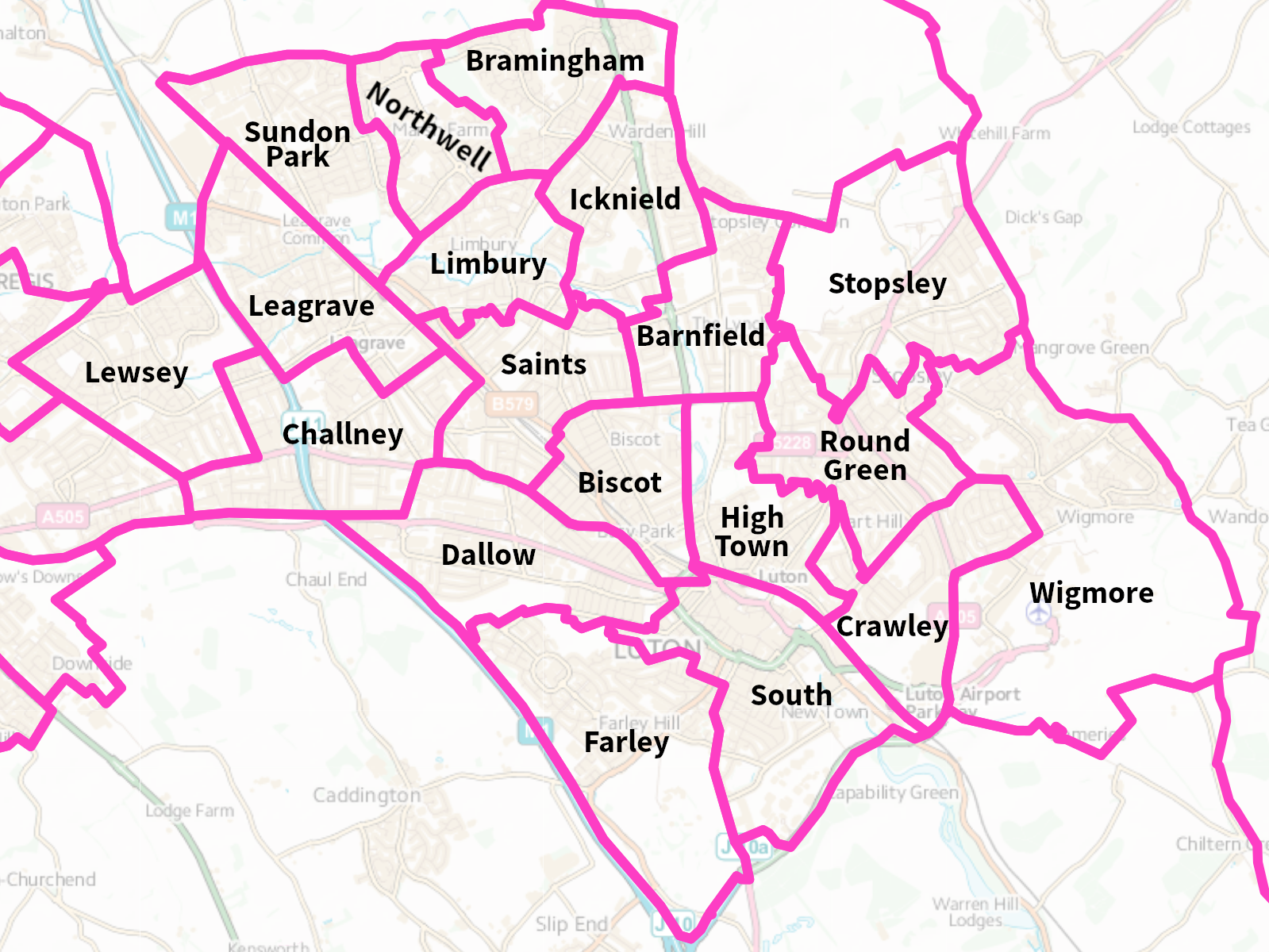
A map of Luton's 19 wards

This is a list of places in Luton, Bedfordshire, England. Luton is a large town, 30 miles (50 km) north of London – one of the largest in England without city status.

Over the years Luton has expanded, taking in former neighbouring villages and hamlets, as well as by the construction of new estates and localities.

== B ==
- Barnfield
- Biscot
- Bramingham
- Bury Park
- Bushmead
- Butterfield Green

== C ==
- Capability Green
- Challney
- Chapel Langley
- Crawley Green

== F ==
- Farley Hill

== H ==
- Hart Hill
- High Town
- Hockwell Ring

== L ==
- Leagrave
- Lewsey
- Lewsey Farm
- Lewsey Park
- Limbury

== M ==
- Maidenhall
- Marsh Farm

== N ==
- Napier Park
- New Town

== P ==
- Putteridge
- Putteridge Bury
- Park Town

== R ==
- Ramridge End
- Round Green
- Runfold

== S ==
- Saints
- Skimpot
- South
- Stopsley
- Sundon Park

== T ==
- Tin Town
- Tophill

== V ==
- Vauxhall Park

== W ==
- Warden Hill
- Wigmore
