= St Mary's Church, Luton =

Coordinates: 51.878695°N 0.410221°W

St Mary's Church
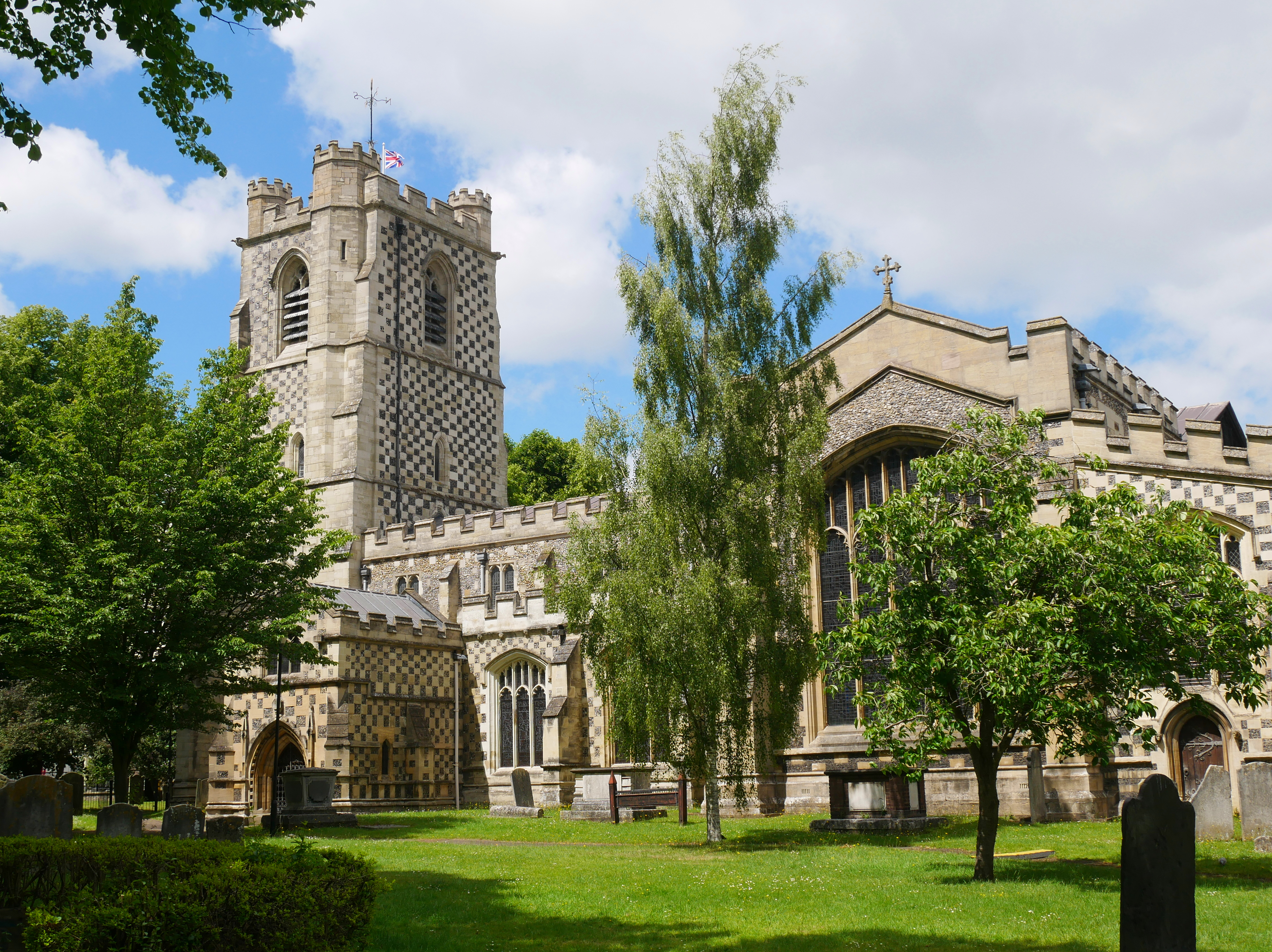
- St Mary's Church
- Country: England
- Denomination: Church of England
- Previous denomination: Roman Catholic
- Churchmanship: Broad church/Open Evangelical
- Website: www.stmarysluton.org

History
- Status: Parish church
- Dedication: St Mary

Architecture
- Functional status: Active

Administration
- Province: Province of Canterbury
- Diocese: Diocese of St Albans
- Archdeaconry: Bedford
- Deanery: Luton
- Parish: Luton

Clergy
- Vicar: Rev. Mike Jones

St Mary's Church is an Anglican Church in the centre of the town of Luton, England. The church has a rich and long history, being over 900 years old and has been rebuilt and refurbished constantly over the centuries. The Church is one of the largest in Bedfordshire and considered a fine example of medieval architecture. The Church is part of the St Albans Diocese. The church is grade-I listed and the only one to be a grade-I listed building in the whole of Luton.

== History ==
=== Original church ===
The site of St Mary's has been the centre of worship for people in the area for over 1,000 years, and a church was built in about 930 AD by King Athelstan as an act of thanksgiving for victory over the Danes. The land here was owned by the king in Saxon and early Norman times and the church was very richly endowed.

=== 12th century ===
The current church was built by Robert, 1st Earl of Gloucester in 1121 and consecrated in 1137. The original structure of the church was a cruciform without aisles, but with the increases in population, the north and south aisles were added within 40 years of each other around the start of the 13th century.

=== 14th century ===
This was a time of great extension to the church, with a tower being built, transepts being extended, with twin arches opening into the new chapels on their east side. A vaulted sacristy with an upper room was built north of the chancel and a new font was given a unique canopy of richly carved stone in an octagonal shape.

=== 15th century ===
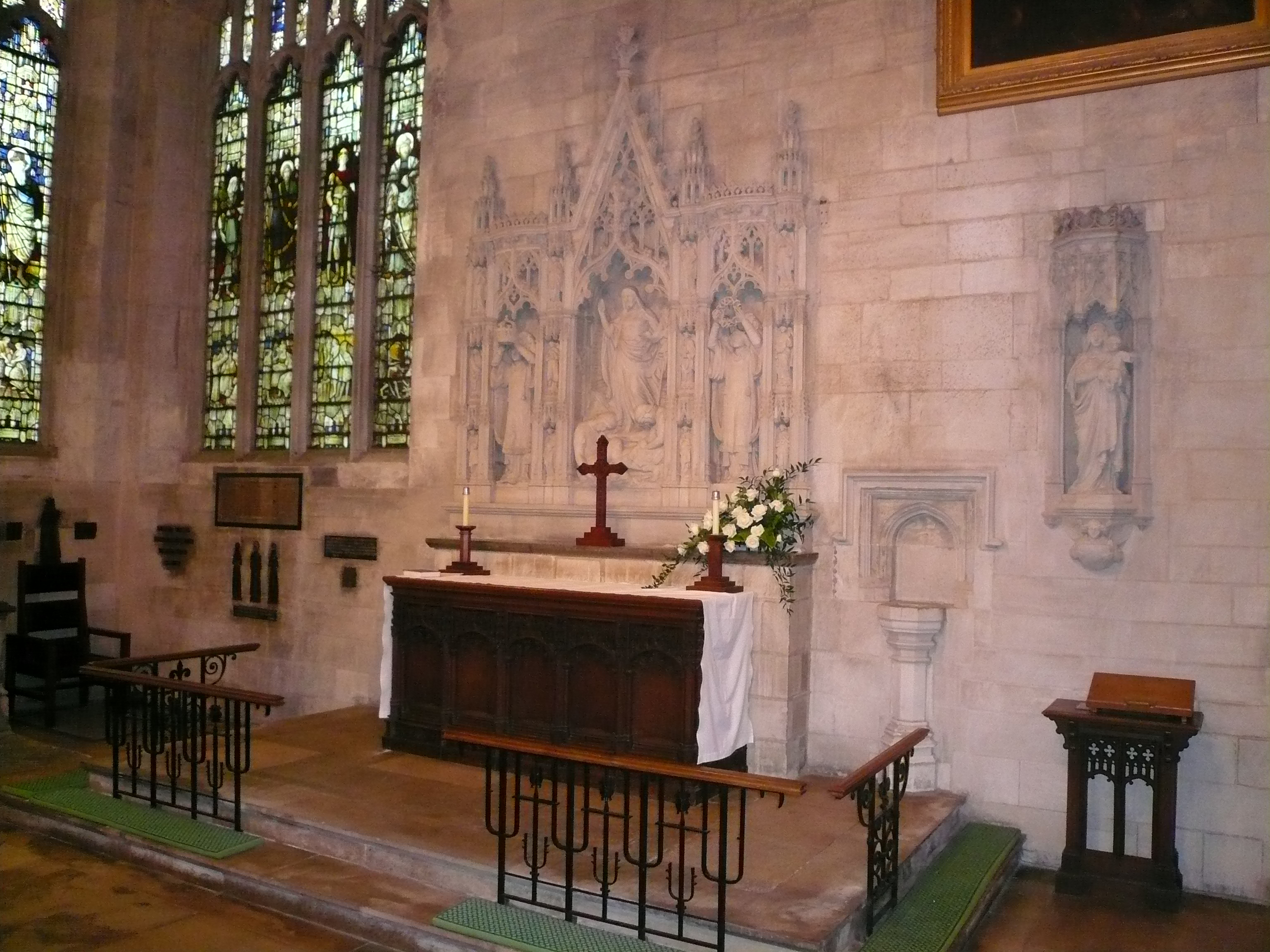
The Wenlock Chapel

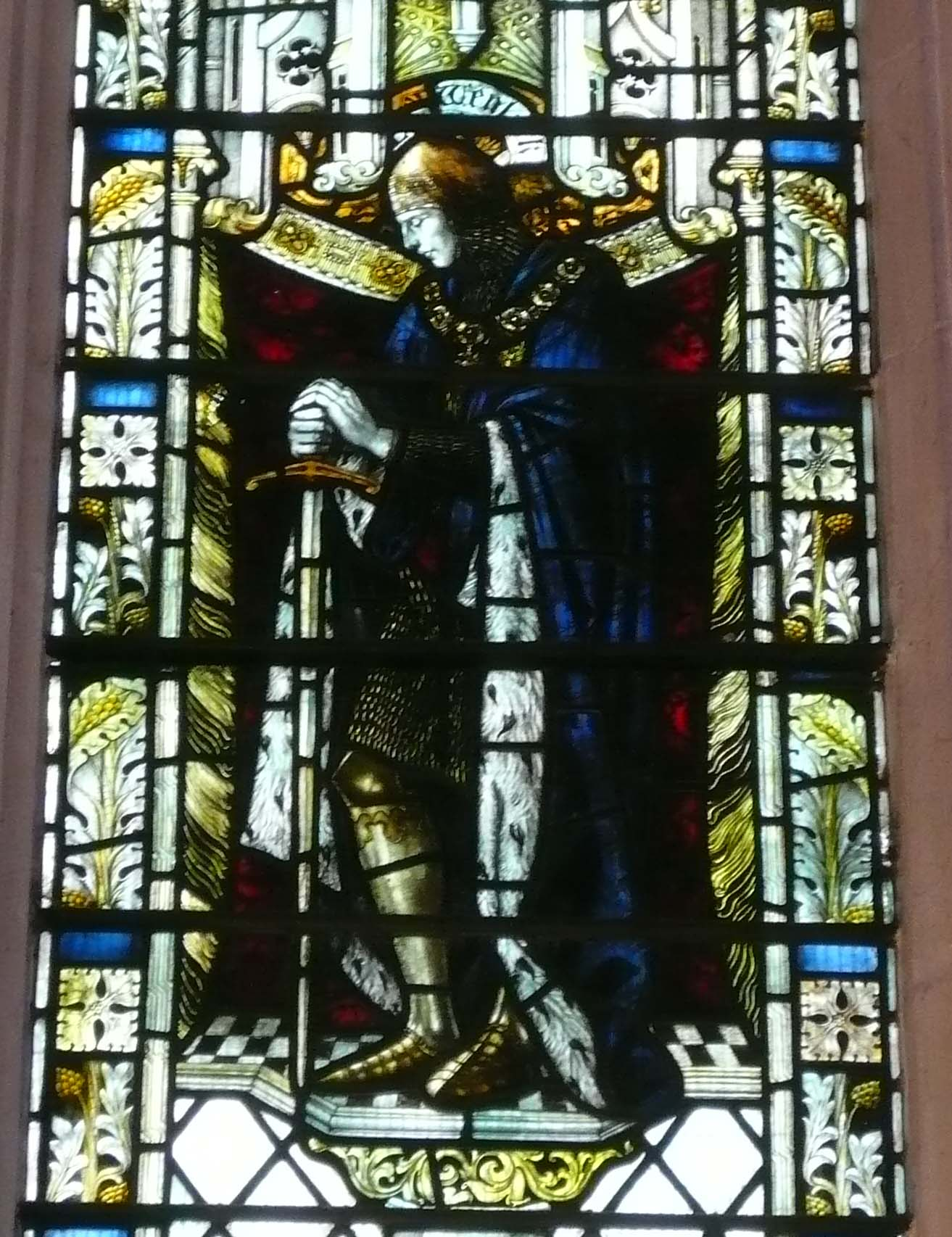
Image of Sir John Wenlock in the Wenlock Chapel

A lot of restoration and rebuilding work was carried out in this time, with Someries chapel being extended, the sacristy being re-built further east and the west tower made taller and having most of the windows renewed. All this work was carried out with the help of Lord John Wenlock, whose family had been connected with the church since 1389. In 1461 the chapel was renamed the Wenlock Chapel, and William Wenlock (father of John) is one of three people interred there.

In addition to the Wenlock Chapel there is also the Hoo Chapel, the Rotheram family monuments and the Barnard Chantry chapel.

=== 19th and 20th centuries ===
Again, in this time, restoration work began to help restore the church to its full glory. The distinctive flint and stone chequer was extended to cover most of the church and the tower was restored in 1906 and the Wenlock Chapel was also restored in 1914. In the 1960s, offices, halls and vestries were built in the chequered style to provide more space and the Magnificat Window in the south transept was installed in 1979. The church has also installed projection screens, moved the pulpit to its former position and completely replaced the Victorian heating system in 2019.

==== The Friends of St Mary's ====
Much of the funding for the building has come from the Friends of St Mary's Luton who have raised over £1 million since 1965.

==== Clock of St Mary's ====
The clock itself was installed in 1901, and faced west across the town. Described as a Cambridge quarter clock with an eight-day movement, it was constructed by J.W. Benson at a cost of £200. The quarters were chime on the second, third, fourth and seventh bells, and the hours struck on the tenor bell, weighing close to 17 cwt.

However, after two overhauls in 1909 and 1949, which included the installation of a new bell, the clock's mechanism's seized and gave up in 1979. The bell was not heard for 28 years, until the University of Bedfordshire (formerly of Luton), decided to offer to help restore the clock, ready for the new year and the millennium. The university owned buildings next to the church and decided it was time to restore the clock to its former glory. The clock was officially re-opened on 11 November 1999, Armistice Day.

=== Present day ===
St Mary's currently stands in the Open Evangelical tradition of the Church of England. It has been known for its youth work in the town and its pioneering peace and reconciliation ministry

The area next to St Mary's Church (Power Court) has been due to be renovated for years. Currently Luton Town Football Club have proposed to develop the site with a stadium and other facilities. The project has been granted planning permission and is due to be completed eventually.

== Architecture ==
The architecture of St Mary's is varied as the church has been renovated and rebuilt many times, but the basic layout is that of a cruciform, with north–south aisles and many chapels and extensions in various directions heading off the main church. The total length of the church is 53 metres (174 ft), the total width is 17 metres (56 ft), and the height is 27 metres (89 ft). The outside of the church is clad in a distinctive flint and stone chequer, which makes the church stand out in the town.

The graveyard in the direct vicinity of the church is no longer used, but a cemetery that covers most of St Anne's hill, the Luton Church Cemetery, is about a mile from the church, heading up to Crawley Green.
