= Queen Elizabeth School, Luton =

Queen Elizabeth School

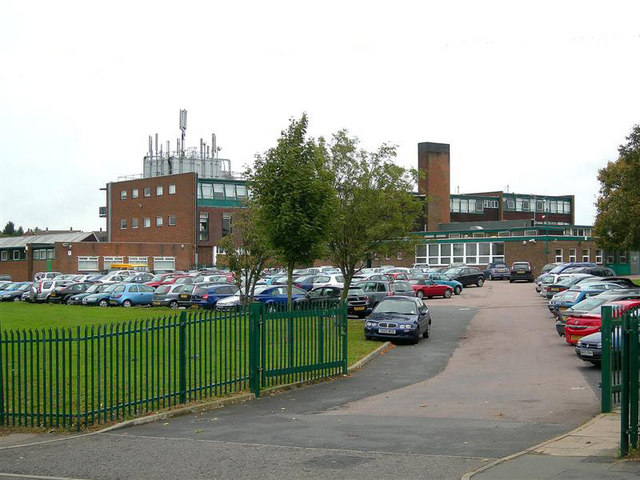
- The school in September 2008

Location
- Crawley Green Road; Crawley Green; Luton, Bedfordshire, LU2 9AG; England
- Coordinates: 51.891°N 0.383°W

Information
- Type: Foundation school
- Motto: Empowering students to achieve academic excellence through aspiration and innovation.
- Established: Rebranded in 2021
- Local authority: Luton Borough Council
- Department for Education URN: 109707 Tables
- Ofsted: Reports
- Headteacher: Rhoda McPherson
- Gender: Coeducational
- Age: 11 to 18
- Enrolment: 1,264
- Houses: Brunel , Drummond , Edison , Haslett
- Colour
- Website: www.qesluton.co.uk

Queen Elizabeth School (formerly Ashcroft High School) is a coeducational secondary school located in the Crawley Green area of Luton in the English county of Bedfordshire.

== History ==
At the time of a 2016 Ofsted report, about 15% of the students were White British; 60% were Asian or British Asian from Bangladeshi, Pakistani, or Indian backgrounds; and 25% were Black or Black British from Caribbean or African backgrounds. Ninety students spoke English as an additional language at an early stage of development. The school had an above average proportion of students eligible for free school meals. The percentage of students identified with learning difficulties and/or disabilities was above the national average, while the number of students with a statement of special educational needs was in line with the national average.

In 2018, Ashcroft High School was named as one of the worst performing schools in the United Kingdom as one of the 346 facilities which fell below the Government's minimum standards for progression.

In September 2021 Ashcroft High School was renamed Queen Elizabeth School. This was to reflect the school gaining its highest ever exam results. The name change also honoured Queen Elizabeth II in the lead up to her Platinum Jubilee in 2022.

== The school today ==
Queen Elizabeth School is a foundation school administered by Luton Borough Council. The school serves the local areas of Crawley Green, parts of High Town and Wigmore. The school caters for students aged between 11 and 16.

== Notable former pupils ==
Whilst the school was formerly known as Ashcroft High School:

- Lewis Baker - professional footballer
- Michael Cain - professional footballer
- Neil Coyle - Labour and independent Member of Parliament for Bermondsey and Old Southwark
- Matthew Harriott - professional footballer
- Callum Reynolds - professional footballer
- Colin Salmon - actor
- Paul Young - singer and guitarist
