= Queen Elizabeth School =

Queen Elizabeth School or Queen Elizabeth's School may refer to:

== United Kingdom ==
England

- Queen Elizabeth Grammar School, Wakefield, West Yorkshire
- Queen Elizabeth High School, Bromyard, Herefordshire
- Queen Elizabeth High School, Hexham, Northumberland
- Queen Elizabeth School, Kirkby Lonsdale, Cumbria
- Queen Elizabeth School, Luton, Bedfordshire
- Queen Elizabeth's Academy, Mansfield, Nottinghamshire
- Queen Elizabeth's Grammar School, Ashbourne, Derbyshire
- Queen Elizabeth's High School, Gainsborough
- Queen Elizabeth's Hospital, an independent school for boys in Bristol
- Queen Elizabeth's Mercian School, Tamworth
- Queen Elizabeth's School, Barnet, London
- Queen Elizabeth's School for Girls, Barnet, London
- Queen Elizabeth's School, Crediton, Devon
- Queen Elizabeth's School, Wimborne Minster, Dorset
- The Queen Elizabeth Academy, Atherstone, Warwickshire
- Former Queen Elizabeth Old Grammar School, Greater Manchester

Wales

- Queen Elizabeth High School, Carmarthen, Carmarthenshire

== Canada ==
- Queen Elizabeth School (Saskatoon), Saskatchewan, Canada
- Queen Elizabeth School (Moncton), New Brunswick, Canada
- Queen Elizabeth High School (Calgary), a public school in Alberta, Canada
- Queen Elizabeth High School (Halifax), Canada
- Queen Elizabeth High School (Edmonton), Alberta, Canada
- Queen Elizabeth Secondary School, Surrey, British Columbia, Canada

== Hong Kong ==
- Queen Elizabeth School, Hong Kong

== See also ==
- QE (disambiguation)
- QEH (disambiguation)
- Queen Elizabeth Elementary School (disambiguation)
- Queen Elizabeth's Grammar School (disambiguation)
- Queen's School (disambiguation)
- Queen Elizabeth (disambiguation)
