= Economy of Luton =

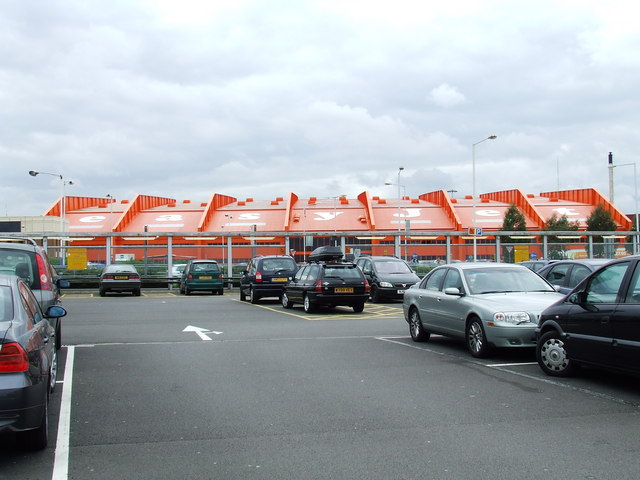
Hangar 89, EasyJet headquarters

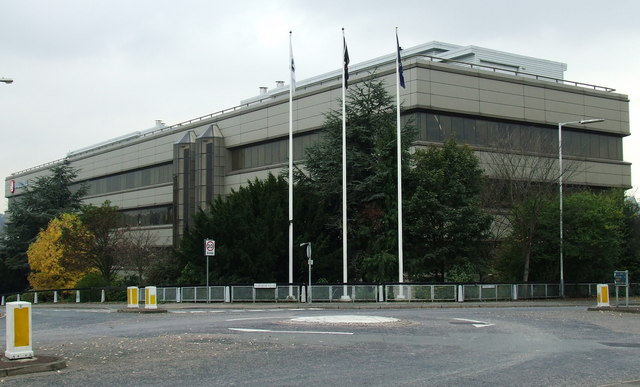
Griffin House, former headquarters of Vauxhall Motors

Over the centuries, due to technological and economic change, Luton's economy has changed and developed to keep pace with the rest of the UK. Major industries that are related to Luton include Brickmaking, Millinery or Hat making, Automobile production and its airport, London Luton Airport.

== Automotive ==
Luton has a long history of automotive manufacturing. Many firms have used Luton as a base for production including Commer, Marcos Engineering and General Motors.

Vauxhall came to Luton in 1905, just two years after the company had started to make cars. The company was taken over by GM in 1925 but continued to develop and build its own vehicles in Luton. In 1931 the truck and bus arm Bedford was created, the first Bedford vehicles were reworked Chevrolet vehicles but Bedford soon became a unique marque in its own right. During the Second World War, Vauxhall became a major supplier of lorries and also produced the Churchill Tank which were tested in the grounds of nearby Luton Hoo. The lake at Wardown Park was even used for testing vehicles to be used on D-Day.

During the 1960s the factory in Luton employed 37,000 people but from the end of the 1960s production and employment in the town was reduced, due to advances in production methods, as well as the opening of a second Vauxhall factory at Ellesmere Port in Cheshire, and the fact that General Motors was importing Vauxhall-badged cars from its West German Opel factories from them in the 1970s, as well as a new factory in Spain from 1982, as part of the integration of its Vauxhall and Opel ranges.

In 2000 the company announced that car production would end and the factory finally closed in March 2002, leaving the Ellesmere Port plant in Cheshire as the company's only remaining car plant in Britain; the remaining Vauxhall-badged models are imported from Opel factories in the rest of Europe. IBC Vehicles still has a factory in the town, producing the Vauxhall Vivaro, Peugeot Expert and Citroen Jumpy vans.

== Principal employers ==
According to the Luton Borough Council, the principal employers in the town are:

#	Employer	# of Employees
1	Luton Borough Council	8,000+
2	Luton and Dunstable University Hospital NHS Foundation Trust	4,000+
3	Aircraft Service International Group	1,000–1,999
3	Carlisle Security Services	1,000–1,999
5	EasyJet	1,000–1,999
6	Menzies Aviation	1,000–1,999
7	Randstad	1,000–1,999
8	TUI	1,000–1,999
9	University of Bedfordshire	1,000–1,999

== Trends ==
This table shows regional gross value added of Luton at current basic prices published with figures in millions of British Pounds Sterling.

Year	Regional Gross Value Added (Note: components may not sum to totals due to rounding)	Agriculture (Note: includes hunting and forestry)	Industry (Note: includes energy and construction)	Services (Note: includes financial intermediation services indirectly measured)
1995	2,067	1	902	1,165
2000	2,614	1	850	1,763
2003	3,090	1	811	2,278
