= The Hat Factory =

Arts venue in Luton, England

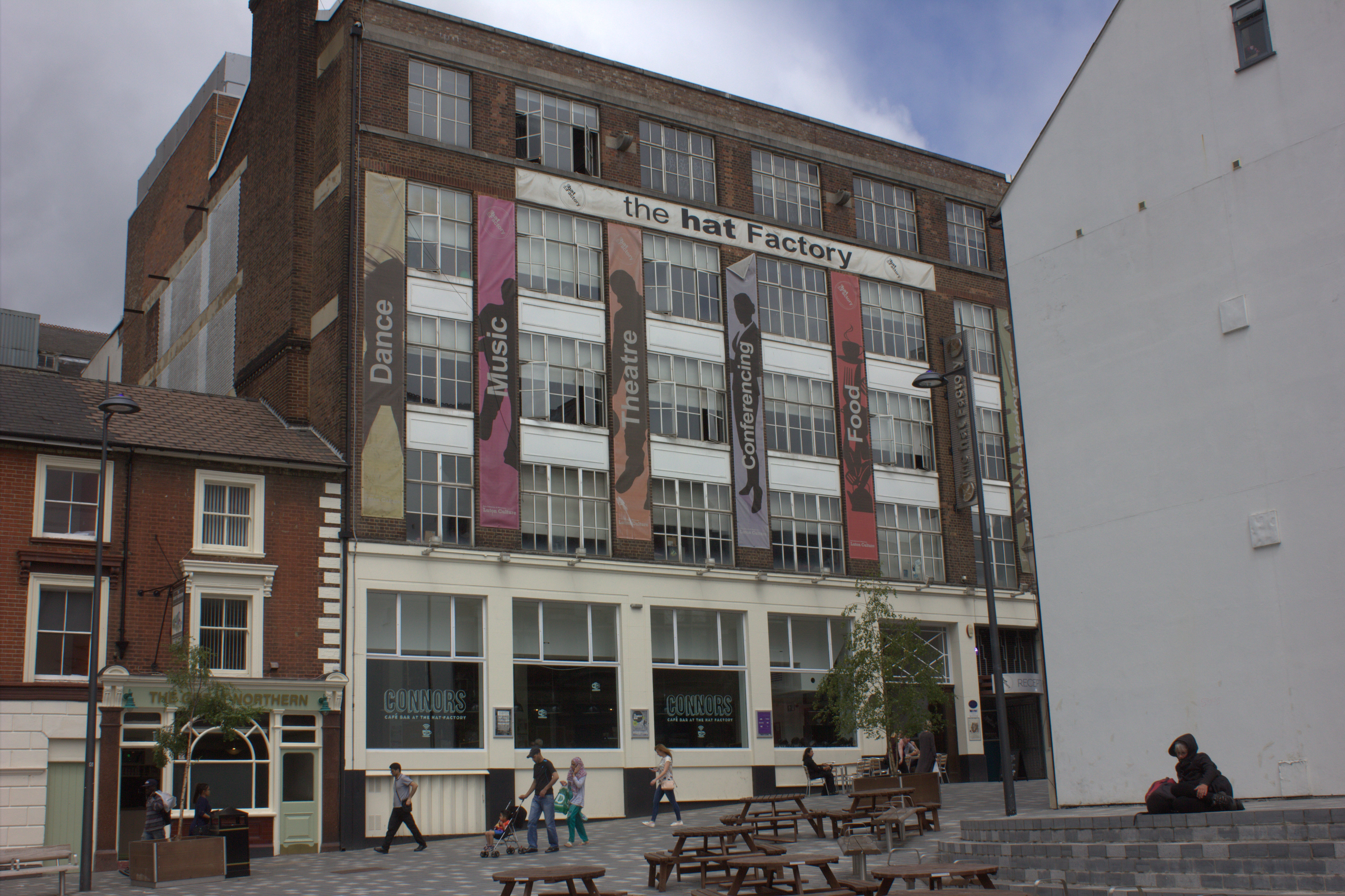
- The Hat Factory (2017)

- Location within Bedfordshire Location within the United Kingdom
- Location: Luton, Bedfordshire, England
- Coordinates: 51.881°N 0.414°W
- Type: Arts centre Theatre; Dance studio

Construction
- Opened: April 2004; 22 years ago

The Hat Factory is an arts facility in the centre of Luton, England that seeks to develop the arts in the town and surrounding region. The Hat Factory opened in April 2004, and includes theatre, music, comedy, dance and film programmes.

The Hat Factory contains a studio theatre, sprung dance studio and space for music rehearsal and recording, as well as meeting rooms and conference facilities. It is home to several creative companies, including the organisers of the Luton Carnival. The Hat Factory Gallery is a joint venture between Luton Borough Council, the Hat Factory and the University of Bedfordshire.
