= Queen Elizabeth's Grammar School =

Queen Elizabeth's Grammar School may refer to:

- Queen Elizabeth's Grammar School, Alford, Lincolnshire, England
- Queen Elizabeth's Grammar School, Ashbourne, Derbyshire, England
- Queen Elizabeth's Grammar School for Boys, Barnet, London, England
- Queen Elizabeth's Grammar School, Blackburn, Lancashire, England
- Queen Elizabeth's Grammar School, Crediton, Devon, England
- Queen Elizabeth's Grammar School, Darlington, Durham, England (now Queen Elizabeth Sixth Form College)
- Queen Elizabeth's Grammar School, Faversham, Kent, England
- Queen Elizabeth's Grammar School, Horncastle, Lincolnshire, England
- St Anne's Academy, formerly Queen Elizabeth's Grammar School, Middleton, Greater Manchester, England
- Landau Forte Academy QEMS, Tamworth, Staffordshire, England (formerly Queen Elizabeth's Grammar School)

Queen Elizabeth Grammar School may refer to:

- Queen Elizabeth Grammar School, Carmarthen, Wales
- Queen Elizabeth Grammar School, Gainsborough, Lincolnshire, England
- Queen Elizabeth Grammar School, Penrith, Cumbria, England
- Queen Elizabeth Grammar School, Wakefield, West Yorkshire, England
- Queen Elizabeth Old Grammar School, Middleton, Greater Manchester, England

== See also ==
- Queen Elizabeth School (disambiguation)
- Queen Elizabeth Elementary School (disambiguation)
