= William Brown (footballer, born 1874) =

English footballer and cricketer

Personal information
- Full name: William Brown
- Date of birth: 27 June 1874
- Place of birth: Luton, Bedfordshire, England
- Date of death: 6 January 1940 (aged 65)
- Place of death: Luton, Bedfordshire, England
- Positions: Forward; winger

Senior career*
Years	Team	Apps	(Gls)
1892–1895	Luton Town		
1895–1899	St Albans City		
1899–1901	Luton Town		
1901–1904	Watford		
1904–????	Luton Town		
- * Club domestic league appearances and goals

William Brown (27 June 1874 – 6 January 1940) was an English amateur footballer and minor counties cricketer.

Brown was born at Luton in June 1874 to William Brown and his wife, Martha. By profession a hat manufacturer, he played for Luton Town in three spells between 1892 and 1904, making 59 appearances and scoring ten goals during his second-spell. In between his three spells, he played for St Albans City from 1895 to 1899 and Watford from 1901 to 1904. Brown also played cricket at minor counties level for Bedfordshire, albeit intermittently, from 1904 to 1914, making sixteen appearances in the Minor Counties Championship. During the Second World War he was employed as a special constable in Luton. He fell ill on 4 January 1940, subsequently dying two days later.
