= Crawley Green =

Suburb of Luton, England

Coordinates: 51.891°N 0.381°W

- Location within Bedfordshire
- Population: 7,230
- OS grid reference: TL0523
- Unitary authority: Luton
- Ceremonial county: Bedfordshire
- Region: East
- Country: England
- Sovereign state: United Kingdom
- Post town: LUTON
- Postcode district: LU2
- Dialling code: 01582
- Police: Bedfordshire
- Fire: Bedfordshire
- Ambulance: East of England
- UK Parliament: Luton North

Crawley Green is a suburb of south-east Luton near to London Luton Airport, in the Borough of Luton, Bedfordshire, England. The area is roughly bounded by Crawley Green Road to the north, Devon Road to the south, the Midland Main Line to the west, and Vauxhall Way to the east.

== History ==
The area was historically owned by the Crawley Family, owners of the now demolished Stockwood House and Stockwood Park. Crawley Green was originally a hamlet and farm on Crawley Green Road, near its junction with Hart Lane. The old farmhouse still stands at 124 Crawley Green Road. Nether Crawley Farm was slightly further up the road near what is now Vauxhall Way.

== Local area ==
The area is mainly residential. The south of the area was built up in the 1920s and 1930s during the interwar expansion of Luton, with the northern half of the area then being developed post war.

In the centre of Crawley Green are Crawley Green Infant School and Wenlock Church of England Junior School, as well as a large open space behind the schools. There is a parade of shops in the north of Crawley Green, on Crawley Green Road near its junction with Somerset Avenue.

== Politics ==
Crawley Green is part of the much larger Crawley ward which also includes Vauxhall Park, Napier Park and parts of Hart Hill. The ward is represented by Cllr Terry Keens (Liberal Democrats) and Cllr Lee Bridgen (Liberal Democrats).

The ward forms part of the parliamentary constituency of Luton South and the MP is Rachel Hopkins (Labour).

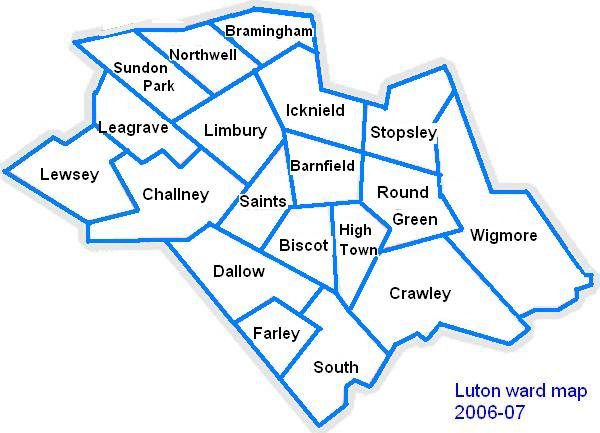
Map of Luton showing Crawley ward which includes Crawley Green

== Sport & Leisure ==
Crawley Green has a Non-League football team Crawley Green F.C. who organise teams at the Crawley Green Recreational Ground next to Queen Elizabeth School, Luton. However in 2018, the first team left the ground to move to Luton Town's training facilities at The Brache in Park Town - formerly the home of Vauxhall Motors F.C. (Luton). Prior to this move, the team had also spent some time groundsharing with Barton Rovers F.C. in nearby Barton-le-Clay.

== Local attractions ==
Key
	Abbey/Priory/Cathedral
Accessible open space	Accessible open space
	Amusement/Theme Park
	Castle
Country Park	Country Park
	English Heritage
	Forestry Commission
Heritage railway	Heritage railway
Historic house	Historic House
Places of Worship	Places of Worship
Museum (free) Museum	Museum (free/not free)
National Trust	National Trust
	Theatre
	Zoo

- Dunstable Downs
- Chiltern Hills
- Leagrave Park
- Leighton Buzzard Light Railway
- Luton Museum & Art Gallery
- The hat Factory
- Luton Hoo
- Mossman Collection
- Someries Castle
- Stockwood Craft Museum
- Stockwood Park
- Wardown Park
- Waulud's Bank
- Whipsnade Tree Cathedral
- Whipsnade Wildlife Park
- Woodside Farm and Wildfowl Park
- Wrest Park Gardens

== Local newspapers ==
Two weekly newspapers cover Crawley Green, although they are not specific to the area.

They are the:

- Herald and Post
- Luton News
