= Napier Park =

Coordinates: 51.8764°N 0.3967°W

- Location within Bedfordshire
- OS grid reference: TL 10466 20973
- Unitary authority: Luton
- Ceremonial county: Bedfordshire
- Region: East
- Country: England
- Sovereign state: United Kingdom
- Post town: LUTON
- Postcode district: LU2
- Dialling code: 01582
- Police: Bedfordshire
- Fire: Bedfordshire
- Ambulance: East of England
- UK Parliament: Luton South

Napier Park is a suburb of Luton, in the south of the town, in Bedfordshire, England. It is roughly bounded by Harrowden Road to the north, the Midland Main Line to the south, Luton Airport to the east, and Devon Road to the West. Napier Park is currently under construction (as of 2018), and is one of the newest suburbs of the town.

== History ==
Napier Park was built on the former site of the Vauxhall Motors Car Factory. The factory first operated on the site in 1905 after Vauxhall moved its operations from Vauxhall in London. Vauxhall Motors was a major employer in Luton for a hundred years, with a commercial vehicle plant also operating in the Dunstable area, an aftersales warehouse in Tophill, and the Vauxhall headquarters in Park Town. Production ceased on the car factory site in 2002, and the large area of the town was cleared and lay empty for over ten years.

In 2014 planning permission to redevelop the site was granted, and construction started in the late 2010s. The new area was named Napier Park, after the Napier family, who lived in nearby Luton Hoo in the 17th and 18th century.

== Local area ==
With construction in the area expected to continue into the 2020s, the area is intended for a mix of residential, leisure, and business use. There are a few notable buildings being constructed in the area, including a cluster of residential towers, the Napier Gateway Towers. The tallest of these, Beacon Tower, will top out at 65 metres (213 ft), making it Luton's tallest building at the time of construction. There will also be shops and restaurants in the south of the area around Napier Square.

Bartlett Square is also in the south of the area, named after Sir Charles John Bartlett, director and chairman of Vauxhall Motors during the Second World War. Bartlett Square is the location of Hart House, a listed building, originally built as the headquarters of Vauxhall Motors before they moved to Park Town. Bartlett Square is due to be redeveloped, with many large office buildings being built. Hart House is scheduled to be converted into a hotel. Bartlett Square is also the location of one of the new stations of the Luton DART, a rail link under construction between Luton Airport Parkway railway station and London Luton Airport.

== Politics ==
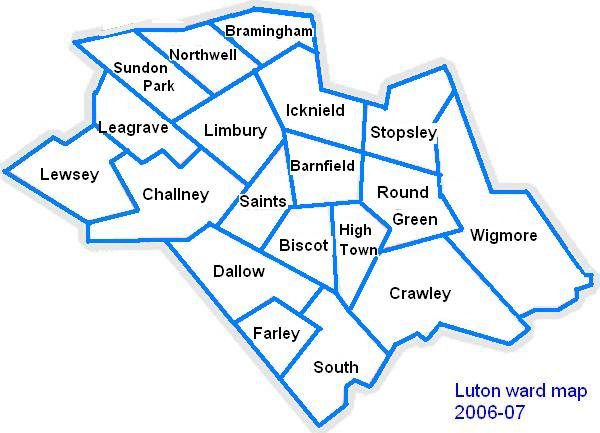
Map of Luton showing wards which contains Napier Park

Napier Park is part of the Crawley and Wigmore wards. The wards form part of the parliamentary constituency of Luton South and the MP is Rachel Hopkins (Labour).
