= Queen Elizabeth Elementary School =

Queen Elizabeth Elementary School may refer to:

In Canada:

- Queen Elizabeth Elementary School (New Westminster), British Columbia
- Queen Elizabeth Elementary School (Vancouver), British Columbia
- Queen Elizabeth Elementary School (Belleville), Ontario
- Queen Elizabeth Public School (Leamington), Ontario
- Queen Elizabeth Public School (Picton), Ontario
- Queen Elizabeth Public School (Sudbury), Ontario
- Queen Elizabeth Public School (Ottawa), Ontario
- Queen Elizabeth Public School (Sault Ste. Marie, Ontario)

== See also ==
- Queen Elizabeth School (disambiguation)
- Queen Elizabeth's Grammar School (disambiguation)
