= Queen Elizabeth Hospital =

Queen Elizabeth Hospital may refer to one of several institutions named after Queen Elizabeth I, Queen Elizabeth II or Queen Elizabeth the Queen Mother:

== United Kingdom ==
- Queen Elizabeth Hospital Birmingham (since 2010), England
- Queen Elizabeth Hospital Birmingham (1933–2010)
- Queen Elizabeth's Hospital, a school in Clifton, Bristol, England
- Queen Elizabeth Hospital, Gateshead, Tyne and Wear, England
- Queen Elizabeth University Hospital, Glasgow, Scotland
- Queen Elizabeth Hospital for Children, London (Bethnal Green), England
- Queen Elizabeth Hospital, King's Lynn, Norfolk, England
- Queen Elizabeth Hospital, London (Woolwich), England
- New QEII Hospital, Welwyn Garden City, Hertfordshire, England

== Canada ==
- Queen Elizabeth II Health Sciences Centre, Nova Scotia
- Queen Elizabeth Hospital (Charlottetown), Prince Edward Island
- Queen Elizabeth Hospital, Toronto
- Queen Elizabeth Hospital, a hospital in Montreal, closed 1995
- Queen Elizabeth II Hospital Emergency Department, Grande Prairie

== Elsewhere ==
- Queen Elizabeth Central Hospital, Blantyre, Malawi
- The Queen Elizabeth Hospital, Adelaide, Australia
- Queen Elizabeth Hospital, Bridgetown, Barbados
- Queen Elizabeth Hospital, Hong Kong
- Queen Elizabeth Hospital, Kota Kinabalu, Malaysia

== See also ==
- List of things named after Queen Elizabeth II § Hospitals and health
- Queen Elizabeth Health Complex, Montreal, Quebec, Canada; see List of hospitals in Montreal
- Queen Elizabeth (disambiguation)
- QEH (disambiguation)
