= QEH =

QEH may be an abbreviation for:

- Queen Elizabeth Hall, a music venue in London, England
- Queen Elizabeth's Hospital, a school in Bristol, England
- Queen Elizabeth Hospital, Adelaide, Australia
- Queen Elizabeth Hospital, Hong Kong, Kowloon, Hong Kong
- Queen Elizabeth House, an educational institution in Oxford, England

== See also ==
- Qeh, a village in Iran
- Queen Elizabeth School, including Queen Elizabeth Highschool
- Queen Elizabeth Hospital
