= Luton Carnival =

Annual event in Luton, England

Coordinates: 51°53′37″N 0°25′08″W

- Genre: Carnival
- Locations: Luton, Bedfordshire, England
- Founded: 1976
- Website: UK Carnival Arts Centre website

Luton International Carnival is a large carnival in Luton, Bedfordshire. The carnival is commissioned by Luton Borough Council and is artistically produced by UK Centre for Carnival Arts, which is based in Luton town centre.

Traditionally it took place on the Spring Bank Holiday Monday every year, but since 2013 it has been on the Sunday of the bank holiday weekend. The route of the procession has varied over the years; in 2016 it started at Wardown Park and made its way along New Bedford Road, Stockingstone Road, Old Bedford Road, Cromwell Hill and back to Wardown Park.

== History ==
The first carnival in Luton was in 1976, on a smaller scale than today, as a Victorian Street Fair and Charity Market as part of Luton Borough Council's centenary celebrations. The carnival developed and evolved over the years and in 1998 the Luton Carnival acquired 'international status', receiving the largest single lottery award for carnival development.

In 2000, to mark the beginning of the new millennium, Luton celebrated with an expanded three-day event with more than 140,000 revellers taking to the streets for the massive international event.

Luton International Carnival is commissioned by Luton Borough Council in partnership with the UK Centre for Carnival Arts and Luton Culture.

The 2007 carnival, which was due to take place on Bank Holiday Monday 28 May, went on hiatus due to unforeseen, adverse weather conditions. Major flooding, following 24 hours of heavy rain, meant New Bedford Road was impassable and the River Lea burst its banks, causing Wardown Park (where the main celebrations are held) to become waterlogged. In addition, continuing high winds meant that stages and other temporary structures were unable to be erected due to safety concerns. This was the first time that the carnival had been called off in history. It resumed in 2008.

To coincide with the 2012 Love Luton Festival and the arrival of the London 2012 Olympic Torch (6–9 July) the date of the international carnival was pushed back to 8 July 2012, to join to form the weekend- festival alongside other annual events such as the Luton Mela, Luton Summer Festival, the Stockwood Concerts and the Festival Concerts, with headlining acts being the Wanted and Olly Murs, and other acts including Skepta and Mz. Bratt. The Olympic Torch, was carried by Lewis Hamilton Formula One driver, through the streets of Luton. The 2012 carnival had 1,500 people participating in the parade which featured 37 different groups, 11 sound systems, masquerade groups, sound trucks, samba troupes, DJs and stilt walkers, all creating an eye catching and dazzling procession, demonstrating the diverse mix of arts, music and culture of Luton. A key feature of the parade was Carnival Crossroads Eastbound, an Arts Council funded project led by UK Centre for Carnival Art's Creative Director, which consisted of 100 local community participants from each of five towns in the East of England to create a spectacular 500-participant central Brazilian-style float.

The Luton Carnival is the largest one-day carnival in the UK, second only to the annual Notting Hill Carnival, a two-day festival in London that attracts around a million people.

The carnival went on hiatus again in 2020 due to Coronavirus, and returned to Luton town centre in 2022.

== See also ==
- Caribbean Carnival
- Caribbean music in the United Kingdom
- British Afro-Caribbean community
- Festivals in the United Kingdom
- Notting Hill Carnival
- West Country Carnival
