= Wigmore, Luton =

Suburb of Luton, England

Coordinates: 51.891°N 0.367°W

Wigmore
- Location within Bedfordshire
- Population: 11,681
- OS grid reference: TL123226
- Unitary authority: Luton
- Ceremonial county: Bedfordshire
- Region: East
- Country: England
- Sovereign state: United Kingdom
- Post town: LUTON
- Postcode district: LU2
- Dialling code: 01582
- Police: Bedfordshire
- Fire: Bedfordshire
- Ambulance: East of England
- UK Parliament: Luton South

Wigmore is a suburb of Luton about 2 miles (3.2 km) east north-east of the town centre, and a ward of the Borough of Luton, in the ceremonial county of Bedfordshire, England. The suburb is roughly bounded by Telscombe Way and Someries Hill to the north, Wigmore Park to the south, Buckingham Drive and Wigmore Lane to the west, and rural Hertfordshire to the east.

== History ==
Until the 1970s Wigmore was agricultural. Wigmore Hall made way for housing; however, the neighbouring early 19th century Wigmore Hall Farmhouse still stands. In the 1970s extensive development began, consisting mostly of suburban low-density residential housing. The 1980s saw further development and the estate now stretches to the county border.

== Local area ==
The neighbouring Wigmore Park District Centre includes a health centre, supermarket, smaller shops and eating places. The Wigmore Place office development comprises three interlinked four storey buildings named Marlborough House, Eaton House and Wigmore House. The latter houses the head office of TUI Airways.

Wigmore Primary School caters for up to 630 children aged 4 to 11. Richmond Hill East, a special primary school for pupils with severe and complex needs, opened in 2016, and is located just off Wigmore Lane in Crawley Green Road.

Wigmore Hall Farmhouse, much extended to the rear, is now a conference centre managed by Active Luton, a Community Wellbeing Trust.

Wigmore is close to London Luton Airport, one of the busiest airports in the United Kingdom. Despite this, Wigmore suffers little aircraft noise due to not being on the flight path. The green space of Wigmore Park also acts as a buffer zone, until such time as the airport sanction is approved.

Parks and open spaces

Wigmore Valley Park and County Wildlife Site, totalling about 85 acres (34 ha), is accessed from Eaton Green Road and bordered to the south and west by London Luton Airport. A large part of the park was laid over a landfill site last utilised in 1978. There are younger and older children’s play areas, a skate park of metal construction, car parking and a community centre building. Near to the skate park is Luton Airfield's World War II Battle Headquarters. The park is known for its wild orchids that flower in early summer, including the Common Spotted, Bee and Pyramidal varieties and hybrids. The County Wildlife Site is recognised for its hedgerows and neutral and calcareous grassland. Common toads, voles and shrews are known to inhabit the site.

Set amidst the detached houses of Malthouse Green and Ennismore Green are the 0.5 acres (0.20 ha) of Malthouse Green Park with its young children's small play area. Wigmore Church Park's 5 acres (2.0 ha) between Crawley Green Road and Colwell Rise has gym equipment and a children's adventure area. Slaughter's Wood is a privately owned 11 acres (4.5 ha) woodland of mainly oak and hornbeam. There are a number of other publicly accessible grassed areas throughout Wigmore and fenced in balancing ponds off Eaton Green Road and the Wigmore Lane/Crawley Green Road roundabout.

== Proposed changes to Wigmore Valley Park ==
Wigmore Valley Park and County Wildlife Site is set to be built on following proposals put forward by London Luton Airport Ltd. A public consultation in 2017 revealed plans for the New Century Park project. The plan shows an access road cutting through the northern part of Wigmore Valley Park leading to a business park in the centre. A car park would be built over half of the County Wildlife Site with an adjacent agricultural field laid out as replacement parkland. Existing play areas would have new equipment, a concrete skate park would be built and the community centre remodelled to include a cafe. The illustrative masterplan map submitted to Luton Borough Council's planning department added a hotel and a link road from the access road to Eaton Green Road. Outline permission for the business park and full permission for the access road and changes to Wigmore Valley Park were approved by Luton Borough Council in February 2021 and formally signed off in June 2021.

In February 2022, London Luton Airport Ltd trading as Luton Rising began a statutory consultation on a proposal to increase the airport's capacity from 18 to 32 million passengers per annum. Plans show the County Wildlife Site largely giving way to airport car parking in phase 1 and completely replaced by the infrastructure for a second airport terminal in phase 2. To mitigate the loss, replacement habitat is to be created.

== Politics ==
Wigmore is part of the much larger Wigmore ward, which also includes parts of Vauxhall Park, Napier Park, Ramridge End and Putteridge. The ward is represented by Cllr Peter Chapman (Liberal Democrats), Cllr Diane Moles (Liberal Democrats) and Cllr Alan Skepelhorn (Liberal Democrats). The ward forms part of the parliamentary constituency of Luton South and the MP is Rachel Hopkins (Labour).

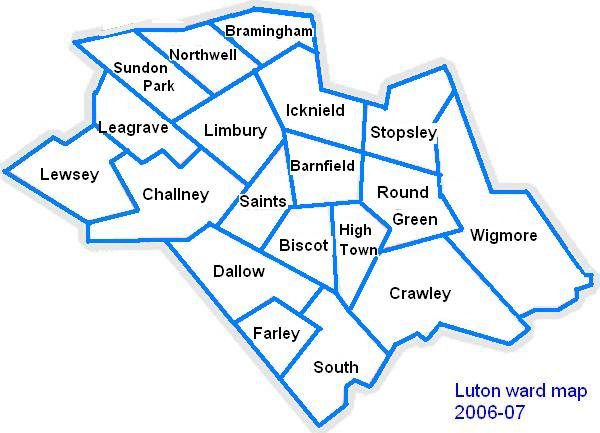
Map of Luton wards from 2006-2007 showing Wigmore.

== Local newspapers ==
Two weekly newspapers cover Wigmore, although they are not specific to the area.

They are the:

- Herald and Post
- Luton News
