= Luton =

Town in Bedfordshire, England

- Town, borough and unitary authority
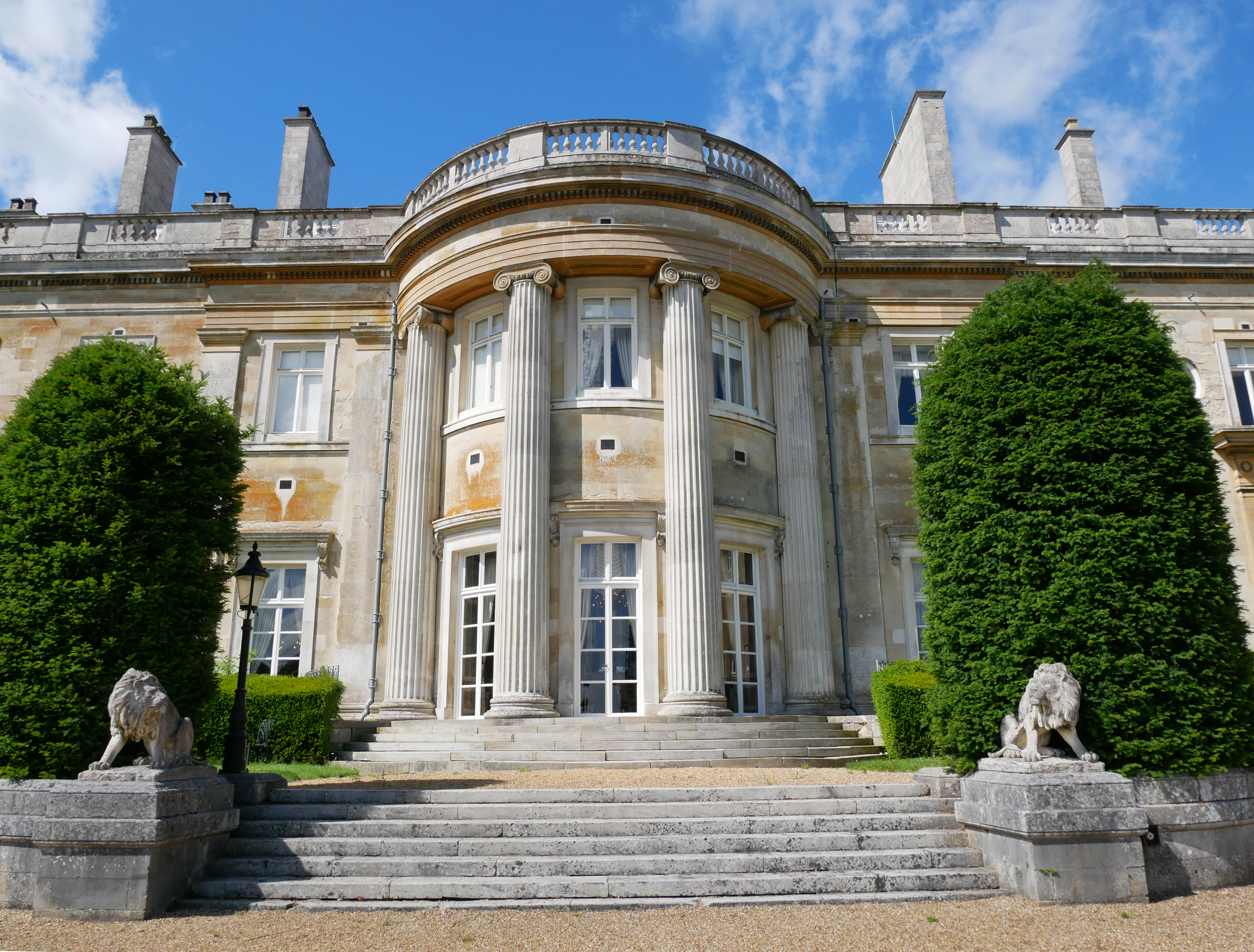
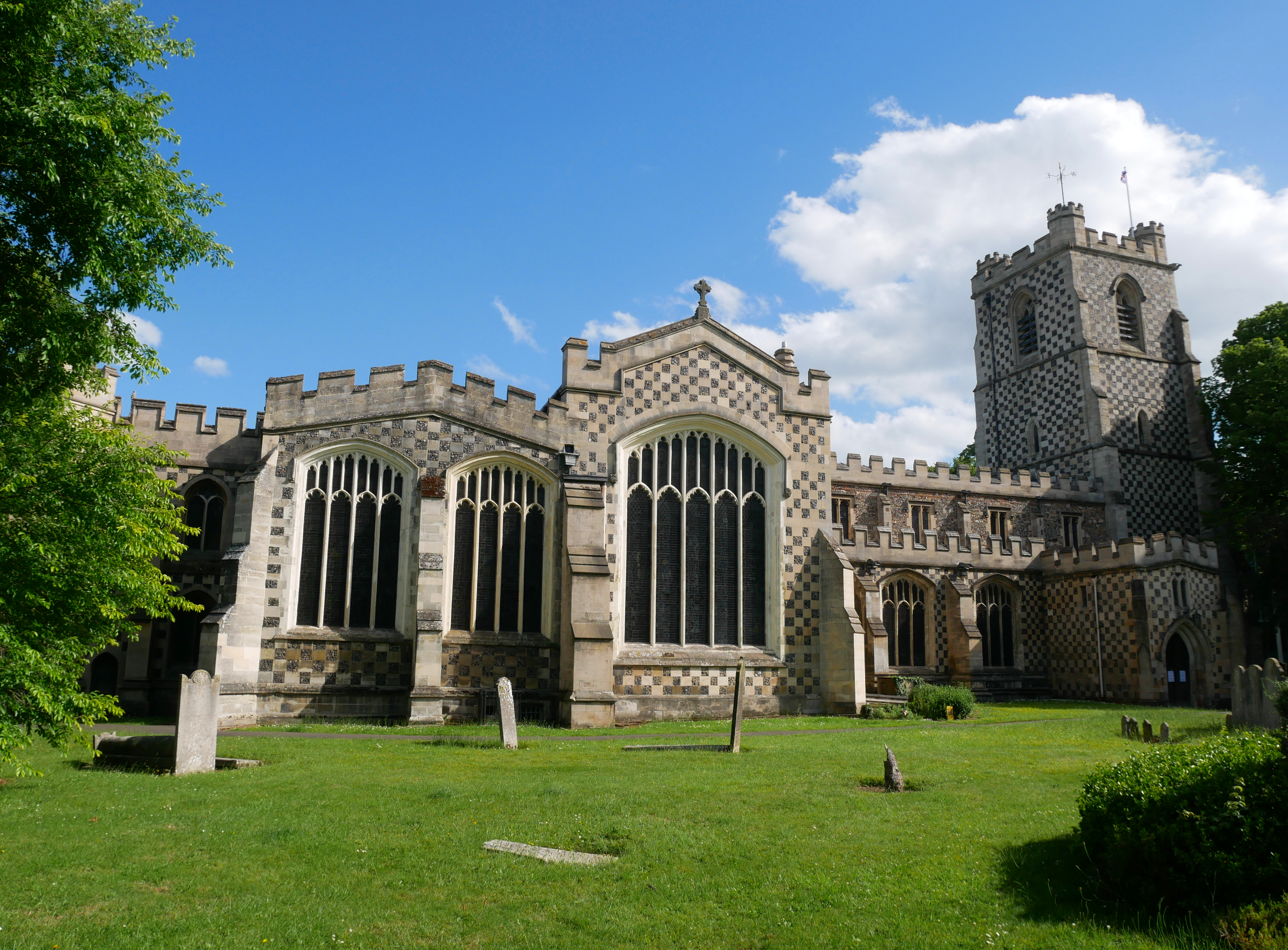
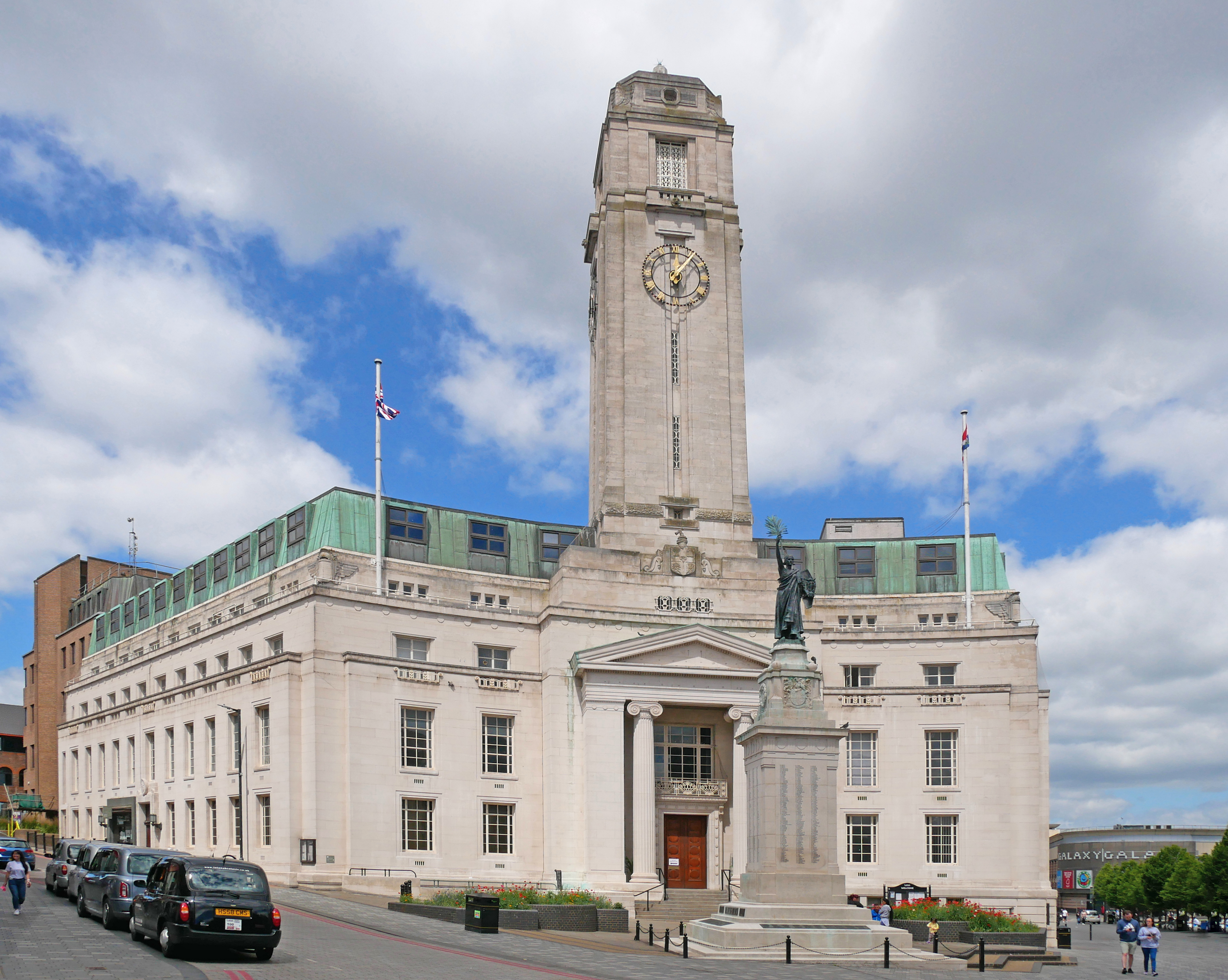
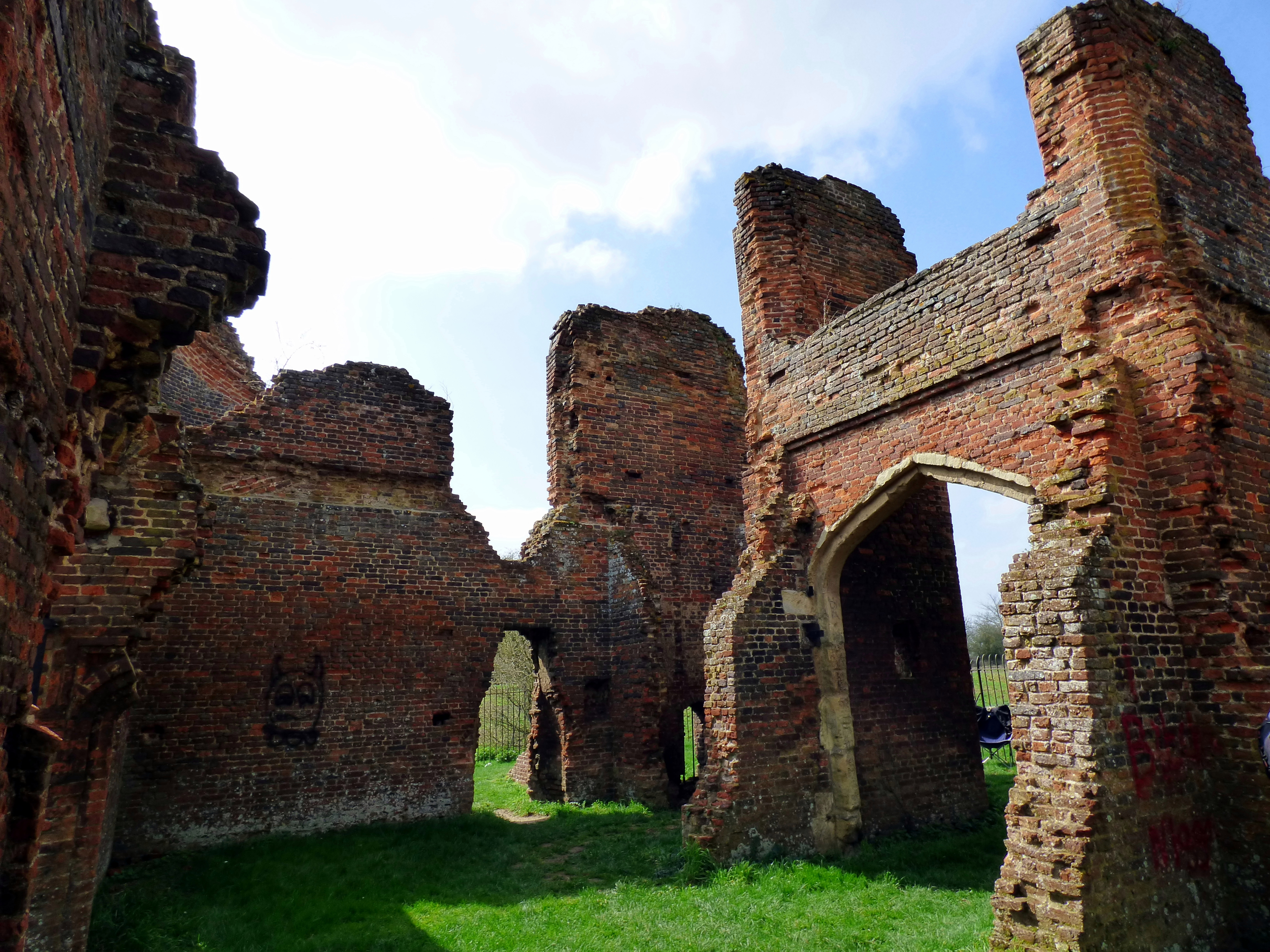
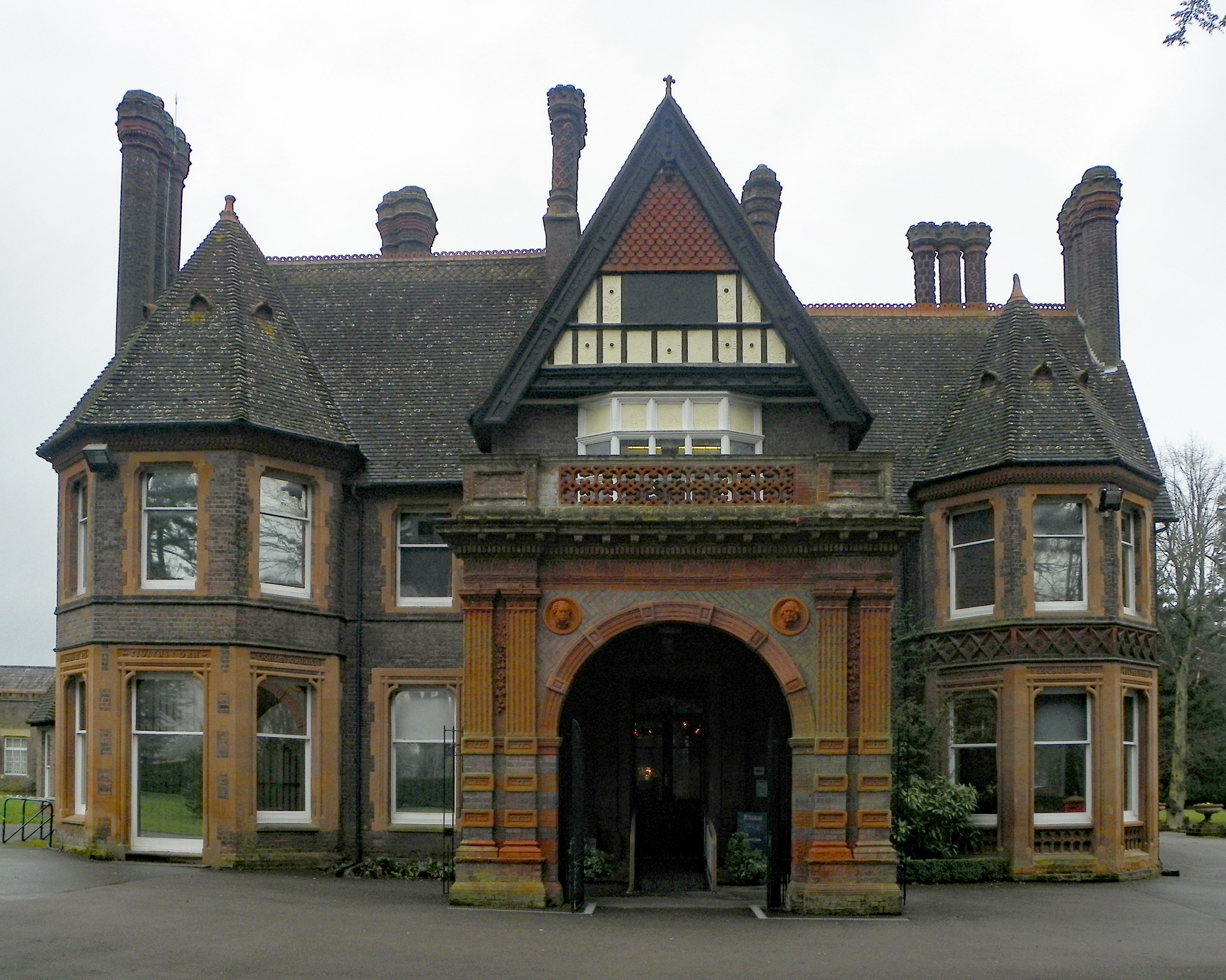
- Luton Hoo St Mary’s Church Luton Town Hall Someries Castle Wardown Park Museum
- Motto(s): Scientiæ et labori detur (Latin) "May it be given to skill and industry"
- Luton shown within Bedfordshire

- Location within England Location within the United Kingdom Location within Europe
- Coordinates: 51°52′42″N 00°24′53″W
- Sovereign state: United Kingdom
- Country: England
- Region: East of England
- Ceremonial county: Bedfordshire
- Settlement: c. 6th century
- Borough: 1876
- Administrative HQ: Luton Town Hall

Government
  - Type: Unitary authority
  - Body: Luton Borough Council
  - Executive: No overall control
  - Mayor: Javed Hussain
  - MPs: Sarah Owen (L); Rachel Hopkins (L)

Area
  - Total: 17 sq mi (43 km^{2})
  - Rank: 254th

Population (2025)
  - Total: 236,380
  - Rank: 83rd
  - Density: 14,120/sq mi (5,452/km^{2})
- Demonym: Lutonian

Ethnicity (2021)
  - Ethnic groups: List: 45.2% White; 37% Asian; 10.1% Black; 4.3% Mixed; 3.5% other

Religion (2021)
  - Religion: List: 37.9% Christianity; 32.9% Islam; 17.6% no religion; 11.6% other
- Time zone: UTC+0 (GMT)
  - Summer (DST): UTC+1 (BST)
- Postcode Area: LU
- Dialling code: 01582
- ISO 3166 code: GB-LUT
- International airport: London Luton Airport (LTN)
- Railway stations: Luton (B); Luton Airport Parkway (D); Leagrave (D)
- OS grid reference: TL0896521763
- GSS code: E06000032
- ONS code: 00KA
- NUTS 3: UKH21
- FIPS 10-4: UKI1
- Website: m.luton.gov.uk

Luton (/ˈluːtən/) is a town and borough in Bedfordshire, England. The borough had a population of 225,262 at the 2021 census.

Luton is on the River Lea, about 32 miles (50 km) north-west of London. The town's foundation dates to the sixth century as a Saxon settlement on the river, from which Luton derives its name. Luton is recorded in the Domesday Book as Loitone and Lintone. One of the largest churches in Bedfordshire, St Mary's Church, was built in the 12th century. There are local museums which explore Luton's history in Wardown Park and Stockwood Park.

Luton was once known for hatmaking and became a centre for the British motor industry with the establishment of the Vauxhall Motors factory in 1905. Car production at the Luton plant continued until 2002. Thereafter, the site focused on commercial vehicle manufacturing which in turn came to an end in 2025. London Luton Airport opened in 1938 and is now one of Britain's major airports, with three railway stations also in the town. The University of Bedfordshire was created from a merger with the University of Luton; two of its campuses are in Luton. Since 1997, Luton Borough Council has been a unitary authority, performing all local government functions in the borough.

Luton Town Football Club, nicknamed the Hatters, due to the town's connection to hatmaking, has had several spells in the top flight of the English league as well as a Football League Cup triumph in 1988. They play at Kenilworth Road, their home since 1905, with a larger stadium in the town centre at Power Court currently under construction. Luton International Carnival, the largest one-day carnival in Europe, is held on the day before the last Monday in May; (Note: Like most long-held UK events on this date, before 1972, it was held during the Christian moving feast and discretionary holiday of Whitsuntide (Pentecost) exactly seven weeks after Easter, in this case usually on the Monday) the Saint Patrick's festival is held on the weekend nearest to Saint Patrick's Day as there is a large Irish community in Luton. The town also has a large Pakistani community which, along with the Irish, were attracted to employment at the Vauxhall car plant. Luton Hoo is an English country house, estate and Grade I listed building originally designed by Scottish architect Robert Adam but later transformed to the designs of Robert Smirke.

== History ==
Luton is believed to have been founded by the Anglo-Saxons sometime in the 6th century. Its name first appears in the 8th century as Lygetun, meaning "town on the River Lea".

The Domesday Book records Luton as Loitone and as Lintone. Agriculture dominated the local economy at that time, and the town's population was around 700 to 800.

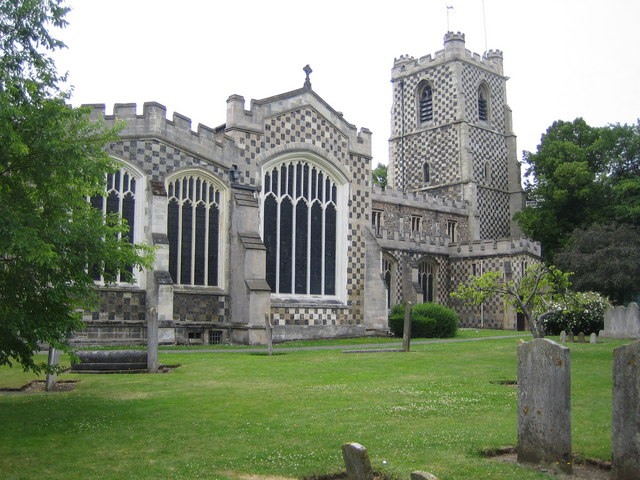
St Mary's Church, Luton town centre

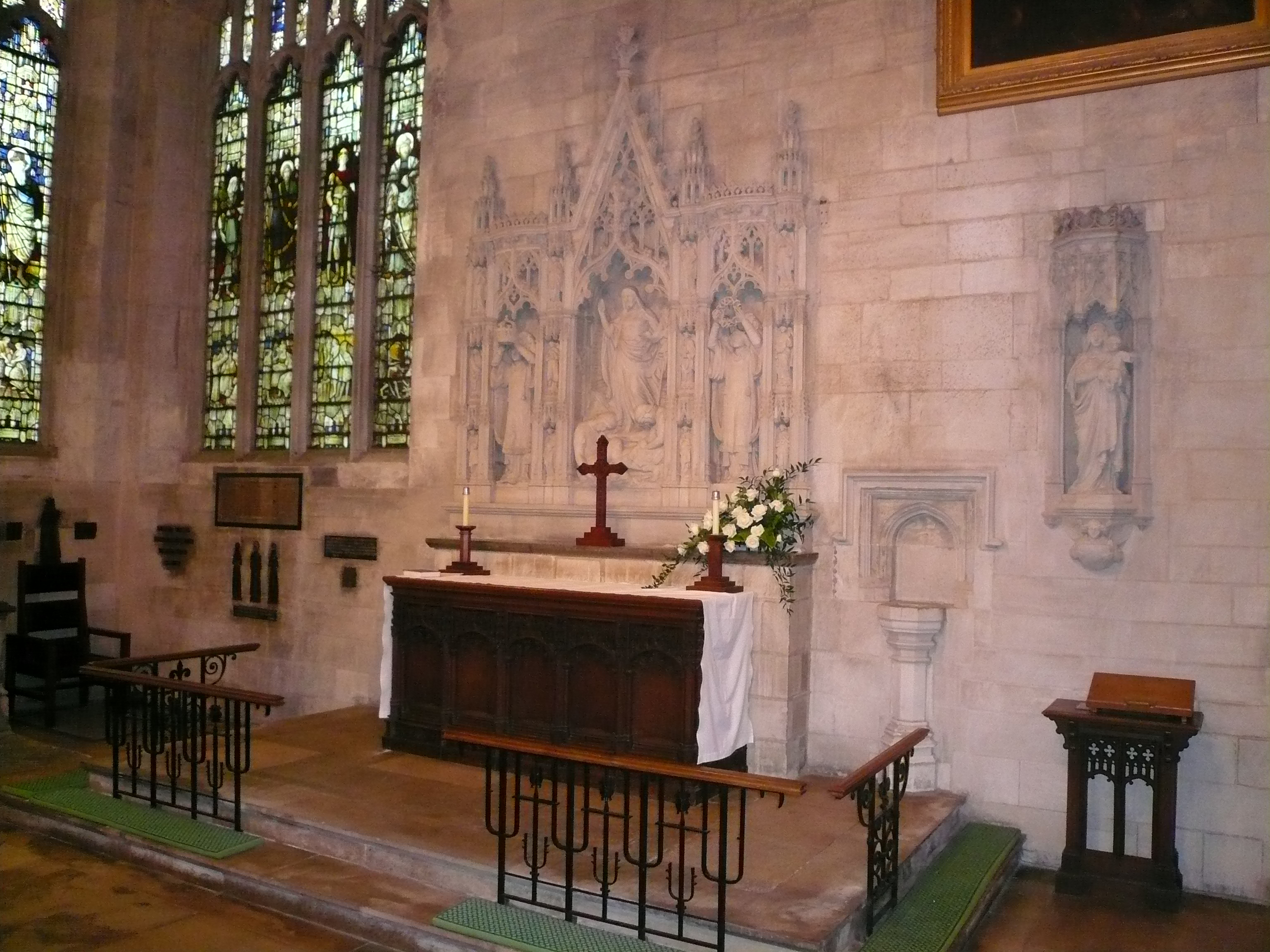
The Wenlock chapel within St Mary's

In 1121 Robert, 1st Earl of Gloucester started work on St Mary's Church in the centre of the town. The work was completed by 1137. A motte-and-bailey castle which gives its name to the modern Castle Street was built in 1139 but demolished by 1154.

The hat making industry began in the 17th century and became synonymous with the town.

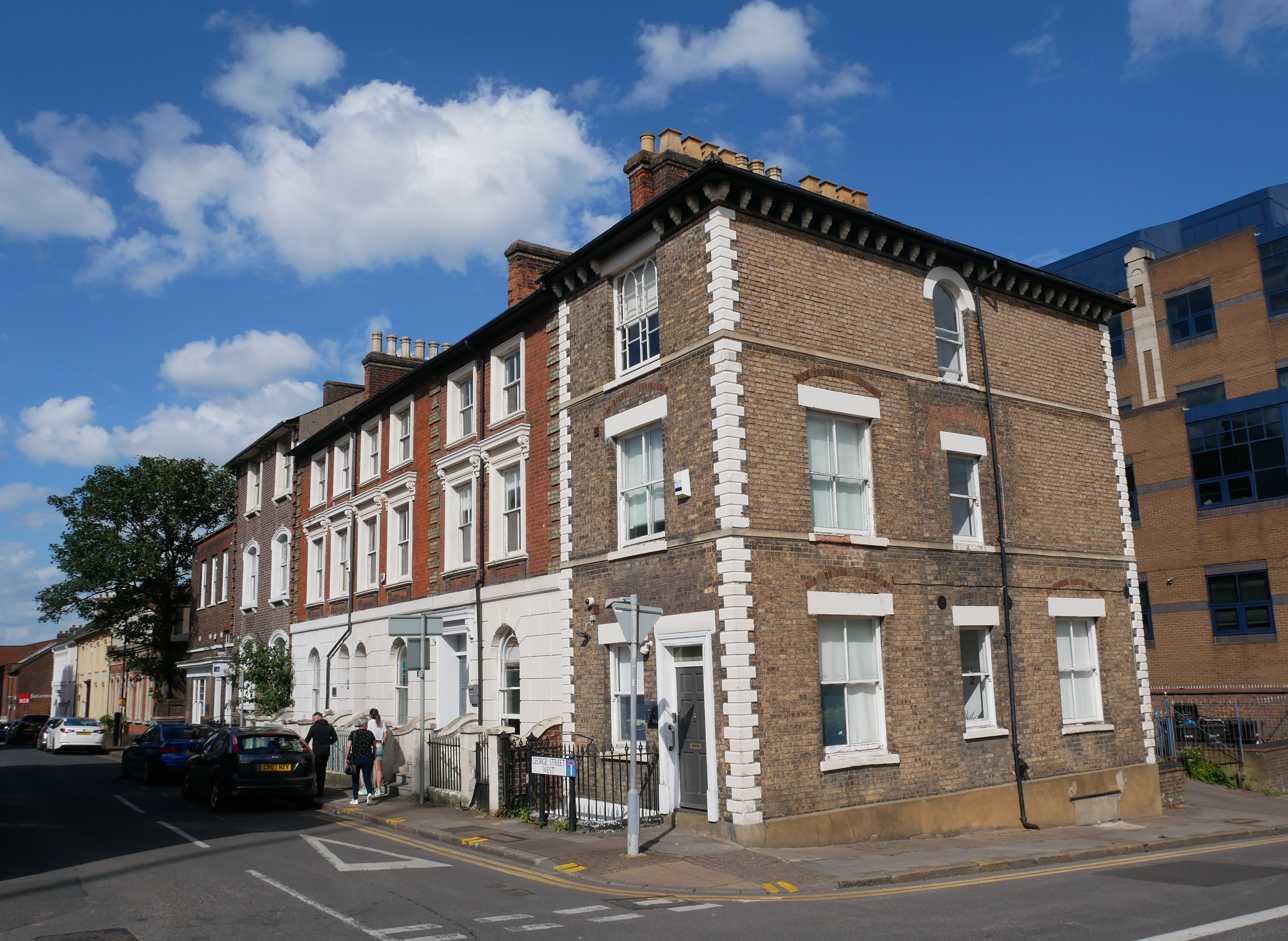
A row of largely Grade II listed buildings in George Street West, Luton

The town grew: in 1801 the population was 3,095, but by 1850 it was over 10,000 and by 1901 it was almost 39,000.

Newspaper printing arrived in the town in 1854. The first public cemetery was opened in the same year and Luton was made a borough in 1876.

Luton's hat trade reached its peak in the 1930s, but severely declined after the Second World War and was replaced by other industries.

In 1907, Vauxhall Motors opened the largest car plant in the United Kingdom in Luton, during the Second World War, it built Churchill tanks as part of the war effort. Despite heavy camouflage, the factory made Luton a target for the Luftwaffe and the town suffered a number of air raids. 107 died and there was extensive damage to the town (over 1,500 homes were damaged or destroyed).

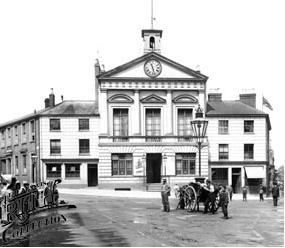
The first town hall was destroyed in 1919

The original town hall was destroyed in 1919 during Peace Day celebrations at the end of the First World War. Dr. John G. Dony, author of The Flora of Bedfordshire, told his history students (he taught at Luton Grammar, predecessor of Luton Sixth Form College) in the 1950s that he had broken the last intact window of the old town hall during the 1919 riots. Local people, including many ex-servicemen, were unhappy with unemployment and had been refused the use of a local park to hold celebratory events. They stormed Luton Town Hall, setting it alight. A replacement building was completed in 1936.

Luton Borough Corporation provided the borough with electricity since the early twentieth century from Luton power station, located adjacent to the railway. Upon nationalisation of the electricity industry in 1948, ownership passed to the British Electricity Authority and later to the Central Electricity Generating Board. Electricity connections to the national grid rendered the 23 megawatt (MW) coal and latterly oil-fired power station redundant. The station had a single chimney and two reinforced concrete cooling towers. The power station closed in 1968. In its final year of operation it delivered 3,192 MWh of electricity to the borough.

Luton Airport opened in 1938, owned and operated by the council. It is now one of the largest employers in the area.

The pre-war years, were something of an economic boom for Luton, as new industries grew and prospered. New private and council housing was built in the 1920s and 1930s, with Luton starting to incorporate nearby villages Leagrave, Limbury and Stopsley between 1928 and 1933.

Post-war, a number of substantial estates of council housing were built, notably at Farley Hill, Stopsley, Limbury, Marsh Farm and Leagrave (Hockwell Ring). The Marsh Farm area of the town was developed in the mid to late 1960s as a large council housing estate, mostly to house the overspill population from London. However, the estate gained a reputation for high levels of crime, poverty and unemployment, which culminated in a riot on the estate in July 1992 and another more serious riot three years later.

The partial closure of the Vauxhall manufacturing plant in 2002 had negative effects for Luton, leading to increased unemployment and deprivation. In 2024, Stellantis (owner of the Vauxhall marque) announced plans to close its operation in Luton.

== Governance ==
There is one tier of local government covering Luton: Luton Borough Council. It has been a unitary authority since 1997, being a district council which also performs the functions of a county council. There are no civil parishes in the borough. The borough remains part of the ceremonial county of Bedfordshire.

As of the 2024 general election, Luton is represented in Parliament by Sarah Owen who holds Luton North and Rachel Hopkins who holds Luton South and South Bedfordshire, both for Labour.

=== Administrative history ===
Luton was an ancient parish in the Flitt hundred. The parish was the largest in Bedfordshire by area, and was subdivided into five hamlets or townships: Hyde, Leagrave, Limbury, Stopsley, and a Luton township covering the central part of the parish including the town itself. The Luton township was made a local board district in 1850. The local board was the town's first elected local authority; previously it had been administered by the parish vestry.

The town was incorporated as a municipal borough in 1876. Later in 1876 the new borough council was granted a coat of arms. The wheatsheaf was used on the crest to represent agriculture and the supply of straw used in the local hatmaking industry. The straw plaiting industry was brought to Luton by a group of Scots under the protection of Sir John Napier of Luton Hoo. The bee is traditionally the emblem of industry and the hive represents the straw plaiting industry for which Luton was famous. The rose is from the arms of the Napier family, whereas the thistle is a symbol for Scotland. An alternative suggestion is that the rose was a national emblem, and the thistle represents the Marquess of Bute, who formerly owned the Manor of Luton Hoo.

The Local Government Act 1894 directed that parishes could no longer straddle borough boundaries, and so the ancient parish was split into a Luton parish covering the same area as the borough and a Luton Rural parish covering the area outside the borough. Luton Rural was abolished in 1896 and its area divided into the four parishes of Hyde, Leagrave, Limbury and Stopsley. In 1928 the Leagrave and Limbury parishes were both abolished and their areas absorbed into the borough of Luton; Stopsley was similarly absorbed in 1933. Hyde remains a separate parish, now forming part of Central Bedfordshire.

Luton was made a county borough in 1964, making it independent from Bedfordshire County Council. It was redesignated as a non-metropolitan district in 1974, making it once more subordinate to the county council. In 1997 the borough council was made a unitary authority, regaining its independence from the county council, which was abolished in 2009.

== Geography ==
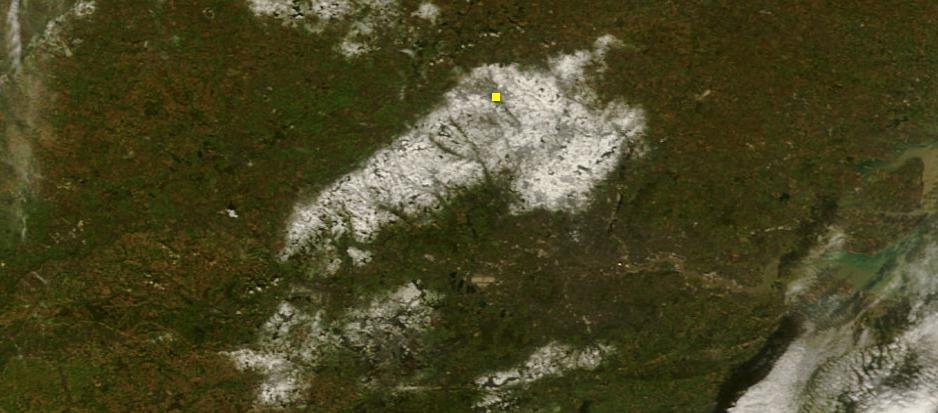
Snow accumulation over the Chiltern Hills during October 2008 snowfall. Luton is denoted by the yellow dot.

The town is situated in a gap at the far east of the Chiltern Hills and is built on the River Lea, which Luton is named after. The town is the most populous settlement in Bedfordshire followed by Bedford. Luton forms a conurbation with the town of Dunstable, which is located to the west on the opposite side of the M1 motorway, and also includes Houghton Regis.

Luton is situated 32 miles (50 km) north-west of London, 10 miles (20 km) north-west of St Albans, 10 miles (20 km) west of Stevenage, 18 miles (29 km) north-east of Aylesbury, 20 miles (32 km) south of Bedford, 23 miles (37 km) south-east of Milton Keynes and 39 miles south-west of Cambridge.

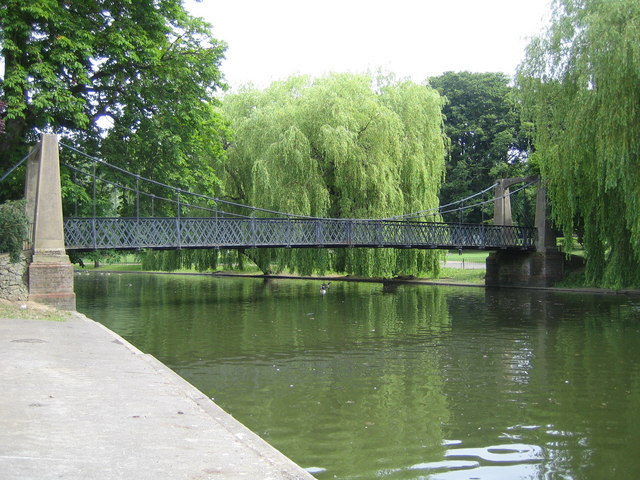
A pedestrian suspension bridge spans the River Lea in Wardown Park.

The source of the River Lea, part of the Thames Valley drainage basin, is in the Leagrave area of the town. The Great Bramingham Wood surrounds this area. It is classified as ancient woodland; records mention the wood at least 400 years ago.

Luton is located in a break in the eastern part of the Chiltern Hills. The Chilterns are a mixture of chalk from the Cretaceous period (about 66 – 145 million years ago) and deposits laid at the southernmost points of the ice sheet during the last ice age (the Warden Hill area can be seen from much of the town).

Bedfordshire had a reputation for brick making but the industry is now significantly reduced. The brickworks at Stopsley took advantage of the clay deposits in the east of the town.

There are few routes through the hilly area for some miles, this has led to several major roads (including the M1 and the A6) and a major rail-link being constructed through the town.

=== Climate ===
Luton has a temperate marine climate, like much of the British Isles, with generally light precipitation throughout the year. The weather is very changeable from day to day and the warming influence of the Gulf Stream makes the region mild for its latitude. The average total annual rainfall is 698 mm (27.5 in) with rain falling on 117 days of the year.

The local climate around Luton is differentiated somewhat from much of South East England due to its position in the Chiltern Hills, meaning it tends to be 1–2 degrees Celsius cooler than the surrounding towns – often flights at Luton airport, lying 160 m (525 ft) above sea level, will be suspended when marginal snow events occur, while airports at lower elevations, such as Heathrow, at 25 m (82 ft) above sea level, continue to function. Absolute temperature extremes recorded at Rothamsted Research Station, 5 miles (8 km) south south east of Luton town centre and at a similar elevation range from −17.0 °C (1.4 °F) in December 1981 and −16.7 °C (1.9 °F) in January 1963 to record highs of 36.6 °C (97.9 °F) in July 2019 and 33.8 °C (92.8 °F) in August 1990 and July 2006. Records for Rothamsted date back to 1901.

Climate data for Rothamsted WMO ID: 03680; coordinates 51°48′24″N 0°21′37″W; elevation: 128 m (420 ft); 1991–2020 normals, extremes 1914–present
| Month | Jan | Feb | Mar | Apr | May | Jun | Jul | Aug | Sep | Oct | Nov | Dec | Year |
|---|---|---|---|---|---|---|---|---|---|---|---|---|---|
| Record high °C (°F) | 14.2 (57.6) | 18.2 (64.8) | 22.3 (72.1) | 26.8 (80.2) | 32.5 (90.5) | 34.3 (93.7) | 38.5 (101.3) | 35.6 (96.1) | 31.0 (87.8) | 26.8 (80.2) | 17.3 (63.1) | 15.3 (59.5) | 38.5 (101.3) |
| Mean daily maximum °C (°F) | 7.1 (44.8) | 7.6 (45.7) | 10.3 (50.5) | 13.4 (56.1) | 16.6 (61.9) | 19.6 (67.3) | 22.1 (71.8) | 21.7 (71.1) | 18.6 (65.5) | 14.3 (57.7) | 10.1 (50.2) | 7.4 (45.3) | 14.1 (57.4) |
| Daily mean °C (°F) | 4.3 (39.7) | 4.6 (40.3) | 6.6 (43.9) | 9.0 (48.2) | 11.9 (53.4) | 14.9 (58.8) | 17.2 (63.0) | 17.0 (62.6) | 14.4 (57.9) | 10.9 (51.6) | 7.2 (45.0) | 4.7 (40.5) | 10.2 (50.4) |
| Mean daily minimum °C (°F) | 1.6 (34.9) | 1.5 (34.7) | 2.8 (37.0) | 4.5 (40.1) | 7.3 (45.1) | 10.2 (50.4) | 12.3 (54.1) | 12.3 (54.1) | 10.1 (50.2) | 7.5 (45.5) | 4.2 (39.6) | 2.0 (35.6) | 6.4 (43.5) |
| Record low °C (°F) | −16.7 (1.9) | −13.6 (7.5) | −12.2 (10.0) | −6.2 (20.8) | −2.8 (27.0) | 0.0 (32.0) | 2.8 (37.0) | 3.1 (37.6) | −0.6 (30.9) | −4.7 (23.5) | −7.5 (18.5) | −17.0 (1.4) | −17.0 (1.4) |
| Average precipitation mm (inches) | 67.6 (2.66) | 50.9 (2.00) | 42.7 (1.68) | 51.2 (2.02) | 51.2 (2.02) | 52.9 (2.08) | 52.2 (2.06) | 68.2 (2.69) | 55.4 (2.18) | 78.2 (3.08) | 76.8 (3.02) | 67.2 (2.65) | 714.5 (28.13) |
| Average precipitation days (≥ 1.0 mm) | 12.2 | 10.4 | 9.2 | 9.5 | 8.4 | 8.3 | 8.5 | 9.5 | 8.9 | 11.4 | 12.1 | 11.8 | 120.2 |
| Mean monthly sunshine hours | 60.0 | 78.3 | 119.1 | 165.9 | 202.5 | 205.2 | 209.0 | 194.4 | 149.8 | 111.5 | 69.2 | 56.0 | 1,620.9 |
Source 1: Met Office
Source 2: KNMI

== Demography ==
The 2021 United Kingdom census showed that the borough had a population of 225,262, a 10.9% increase from the previous census in 2011 and a 22.2% increase compared with 2001. In 2021, 52,566 residents (23% of the total) were aged under 16, 146,330 (65%) were aged 16 to 64, and 26,363 (12%) were aged 65 or over.

Local inhabitants are known as Lutonians.

=== Ethnicity ===
Ethnic demography of Luton from 1971 to 2021

Luton: Ethnicity: 2011 Census and 2021 Census
| Ethnic group | 2011 Population | 2011 % | 2021 Population | 2021 % |
| White | 111,079 | 54.7 | 101,798 | 45.2 |
| Mixed | 8,281 | 4.1 | 9,620 | 4.3 |
| Asian or Asian British | 60,952 | 30.0 | 83,325 | 37.0 |
| Black or Black British | 19,909 | 9.8 | 22,735 | 10.1 |
| Other Ethnic Group | 2,980 | 1.5 | 7,783 | 3.5 |
| Total | 203,201 | 100 | 225,261 | 100 |

Luton has seen several waves of immigration. In the early part of the 20th century, migrants from Ireland and Scotland came to the town. These were followed by South Asian and Afro-Caribbean immigrants. More recently immigrants from European countries such as Albania have made Luton their home. As a result of this Luton has a diverse ethnic mix, with a significant population of Asian descent, mainly Pakistani (41,143 residents, 18.3%) and Bangladeshi (20,630, 9.2%). People in Asian ethnic groups accounted for 86% of Luton's Muslim population in 2021.

As of the 2021 census, the White British (White English, Scottish, Welsh, and Northern Irish) population of Luton comprised less than a third of the total (31.8%), the twelfth lowest proportion out of 318 local authorities in England and Wales and the second lowest (after Slough) outside of London. Overall, 45.2% of Luton's population in 2021 was White (including non-British White people), down from 54.7% in 2011.

In 2011 81% of the population of Luton defined themselves as British.

=== Religion ===
Religion in Luton (2021 census)
1. Christianity (37.9%)
2. Islam (32.9%)
3. No religion (17.6%)
4. Undeclared (6.10%)
5. Hinduism (3.30%)
6. Sikhism (1.30%)
7. Buddhism (0.30%)
8. Judaism (0.10%)
9. Other religions (0.50%)

At the 2021 census, the religious affiliation of Luton was as follows:

| Religion | Population | % |
|---|---|---|
| Christian | 85,297 | 37.9 |
| Muslim | 74,191 | 32.9 |
| Hindu | 7,438 | 3.3 |
| Sikh | 3,032 | 1.3 |
| Buddhist | 664 | 0.3 |
| Jewish | 246 | 0.1 |
| Other religion | 1,115 | 0.5 |
| No religion | 39,580 | 17.6 |
| Religion not stated | 13,697 | 6.1 |

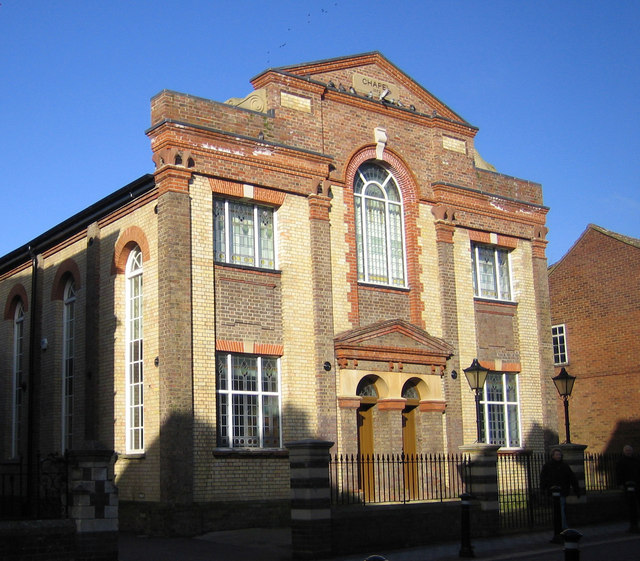
The Methodist Chapel in High Town, built 1897

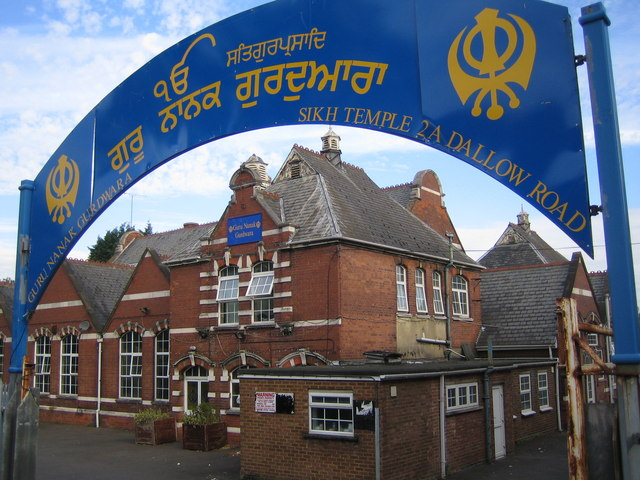
The Guru Nanak Gurdwara Sikh Temple

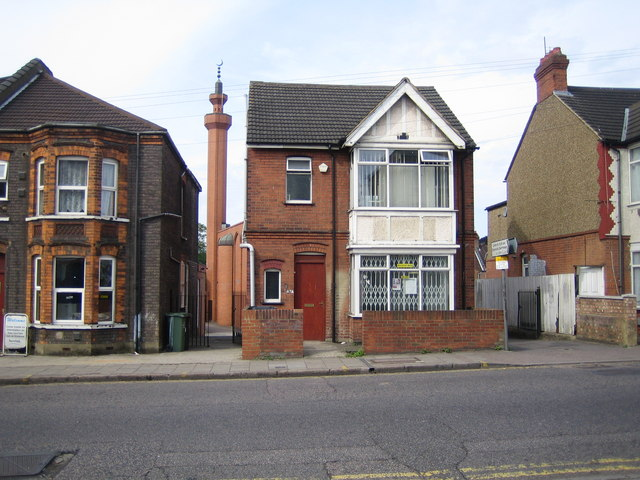
The Jamia Mosque

== Economy ==
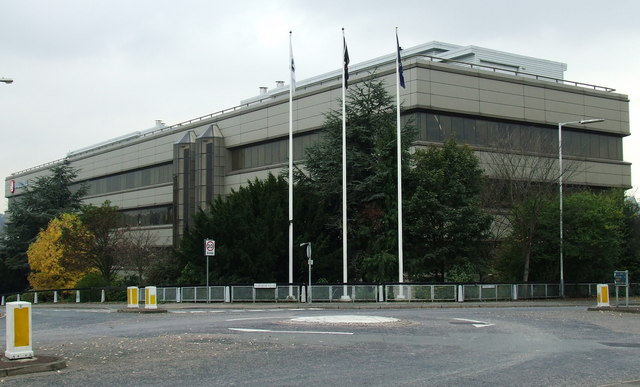
Griffin House, former headquarters of Vauxhall Motors

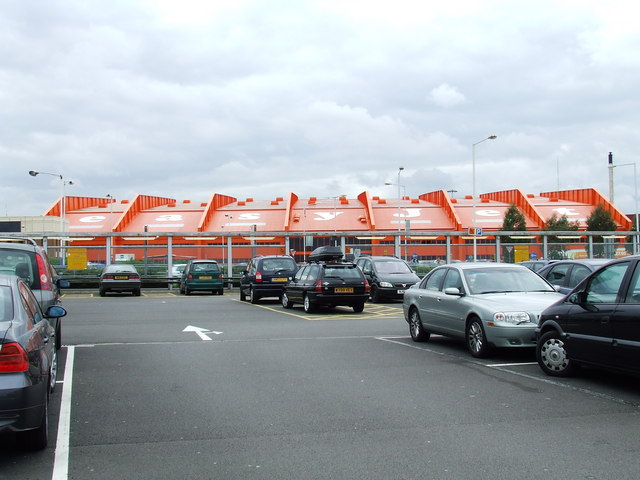
Hangar 89, EasyJet headquarters

Luton's economy has traditionally been focused on several different areas of industry, including car manufacturing, engineering and millinery. Today, Luton is moving towards a service based economy mainly in the retail and the airport sectors, although there is still a focus on light industry in the town.

Notable firms with headquarters in Luton include:

- EasyJet – head office (originally EasyLand, later moved into Hangar 89) and main base at London Luton Airport
- Impellam Group – headquarters at Capability Green
- TUI UK (TUI Airways) – travel (Wigmore House)

Notable firms with offices in Luton include:

- Anritsu – electronics
- AstraZeneca – pharmaceuticals
- Selex ES – aerospace
- Ernst & Young – accountants
- Whitbread – hospitality
- Stonegate Pub Company – hospitality

Luton's post-war and more recent industrial decline has been compared to that of similar towns in northern England.

=== Employment ===
In 2008, of the town's working population, classified 16–74 years of age by the Office for National Statistics, 63% are employed. This figure includes students, the self-employed and those who are in part-time employment. 11% are retired, 8% look after the family or take care of the home and 5% are unemployed.

== Transport ==
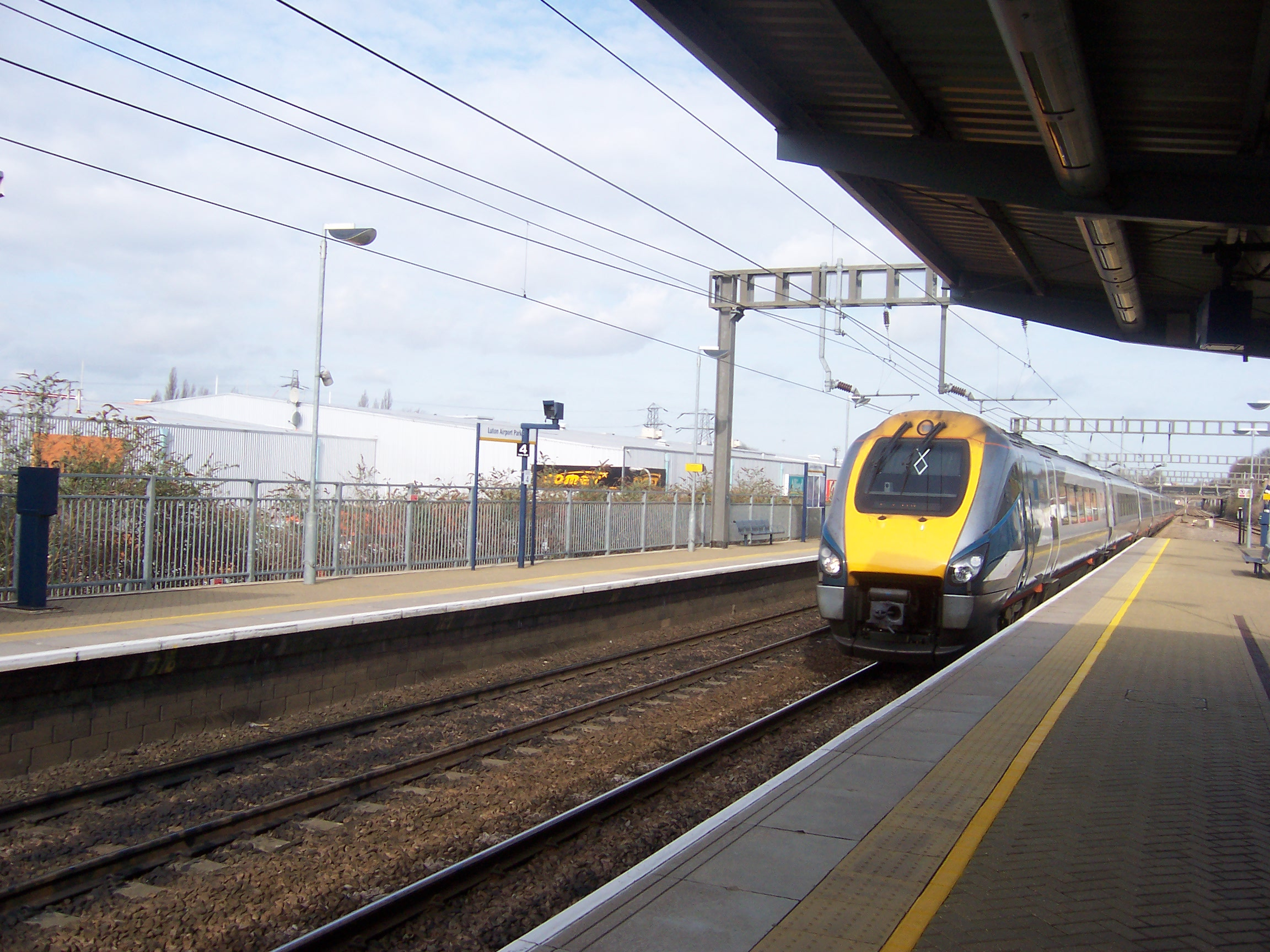
A Midland Mainline Class 222 at Luton Airport Parkway in April 2006

Luton is less than 30 miles (50 km) north of the centre of London, giving it good links with the City and other parts of the country via rail and major roads such as the M1 (which serves the town from junctions 10 and 11) and the A6.

The town has three railway stations: Luton, Leagrave and Luton Airport Parkway that are served by East Midlands Railway and Thameslink services.

Luton is also home to London Luton Airport, one of the major feeder airports for London and the south-east. An automated people mover, the Luton DART, opened in 2023, linking the airport and Luton Airport Parkway railway station.

A network of bus services run by Arriva, Grant Palmer and Centrebus serves the urban area of Luton and Dunstable. A guided busway route, the Luton to Dunstable Busway, opened in 2013, connecting the town with the airport, Dunstable and Houghton Regis. Uno, Red Eagle and Stagecoach also operate in the town, as well as National Express Coaches.

Luton is also served by a large minicab and taxi network. As a unitary authority, Luton Borough Council is responsible for the local highways and public transport in the borough and licensing of taxis.

== Education ==
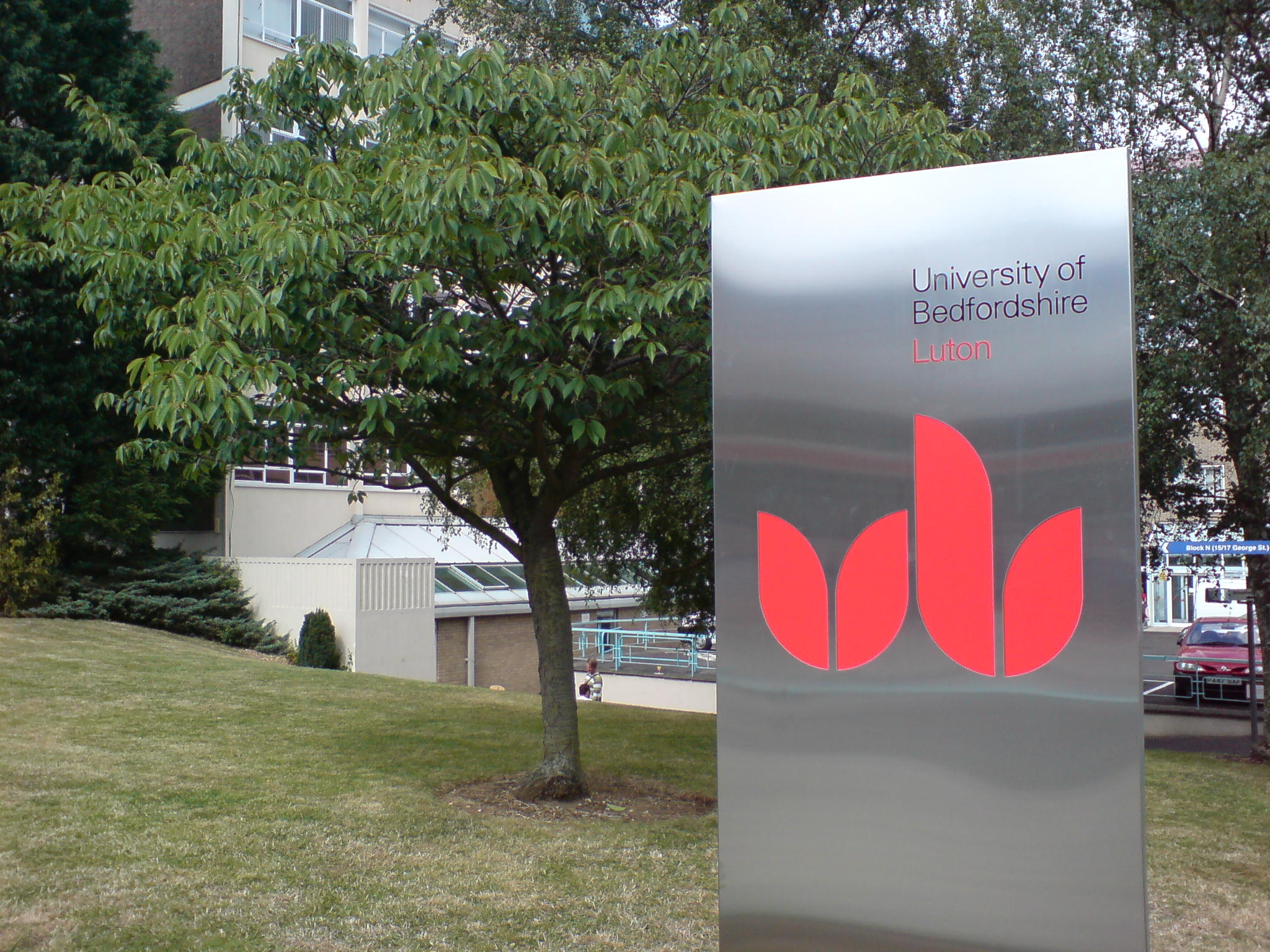
University of Bedfordshire – Luton

Luton is one of the main locations of the University of Bedfordshire. A large campus of the university is in Luton town centre, with a smaller campus based on the edge of town in Putteridge Bury, an old Victorian manor house. The other campuses of the university are located in Bedford, Milton Keynes and Aylesbury.

The town is home to Luton Sixth Form College and Barnfield College. Both have been awarded Learning & Skills Beacon Status by the Department for Children, Schools and Families.

There are 98 educational institutes in Luton – seven nurseries, 56 primary schools (9 voluntary-aided, 2 special requirements), 13 secondary schools (1 voluntary-aided, 1 special requirements), four further educational institutes and four other educational institutes.

== Culture ==
=== Architecture ===
The town contains 92 listed buildings.

=== Leisure and entertainment ===
==== Luton International Carnival ====
Luton International Carnival is the largest one-day carnival in Europe. It usually takes place on the late May Bank Holiday. Crowds can reach 150,000 on each occasion.

The procession starts at Wardown Park and makes its way down New Bedford Road, around the town centre via St George's Square, back down New Bedford Road and finishes back at Wardown Park. There are music stages and stalls around the town centre and at Wardown Park.

Luton is home to the UK Centre for Carnival Arts (UKCCA), the country's first purpose-built facility of its kind.

==== Luton St Patrick's Festival ====
The festival celebrating the patron saint of Ireland St Patrick and organised by Luton Irish Forum, is held on the weekend nearest to 17 March. In its 20th year in 2019, the festival includes a parade, market stalls and music stands as well as Irish themed events.

==== Orange Order ====
The Luton Sons of William Loyal Orange Lodge No. 1002 was established in the 1960's. It is a part of the Orange Order and is governed by the Grand Orange Lodge of England. They are a Protestant fraternity that hold regular meetings and participate in Orange walks. The name "Sons of William" refers to William III, victor of the Battle of the Boyne. The Luton & Bedford Drumming Club is a part of the community. They promote Ulster Scots culture and heritage within the area. The club play traditional lambeg and Ulster rope drums and march in parades. Formed in 2005, the inaugural parade was in September of that year.

==== Luton Mela ====
The first Luton Melā took place in August 2000 and has developed into one of the most significant and well attended South Asian cultural events in the eastern region.

==== City of Culture bid and pilot year ====
As a part of Luton Borough Council's 2017-2027 arts and culture development programme, a series of events titled People Power Passion were held in 2019 as a pilot for their 2025 City of Culture bid. This included a centennial commemoration of the Luton Peace Day Riots.

The bid was dropped in early 2020 as a result of low attendance, and the budget was redirected towards other art projects.

=== Theatre and performing arts ===
Luton is home to the Library Theatre, a 238-seat theatre located on the 3rd floor of the town's Central Library. The theatre's programme consists of local amateur dramatic societies, pantomime, children's theatre (on Saturday mornings) and one night shows of touring theatre companies.

Luton is also home to the Hat Factory, originally as its name suggests, this arts centre was in fact a real hat factory. The Hat Factory is a combined arts venue in the centre of Luton. It opened in 2003 and since then has been the area's main provider of contemporary theatre, dance and music. The venue provides live music, club nights, theatre, dance, films, children's activities, workshops, classes and gallery exhibitions.

=== Media ===
==== Newspapers ====
The Luton News, now online as Luton Today. Former journalists include comedy screenwriter David Renwick, author of One Foot in the Grave.

==== Radio ====
- BBC Three Counties Radio, the local BBC station, broadcasts from its office in Dunstable to Bedfordshire, Hertfordshire and Buckinghamshire.
- Diverse FM began broadcasts in April 2007 having been awarded a community radio licence from Ofcom.
- Radio LaB (formerly Luton FM), the university's radio station, began broadcasting full-time in 2010 having been awarded a community radio licence from Ofcom.

==== Television ====
- Luton is served by London and East Anglia regional variations of the BBC and ITV. Television signals are received from either Crystal Palace or Sandy Heath TV transmitters. However, the local relay transmitter for Luton only broadcast programmes from Norwich.

=== Local attractions ===
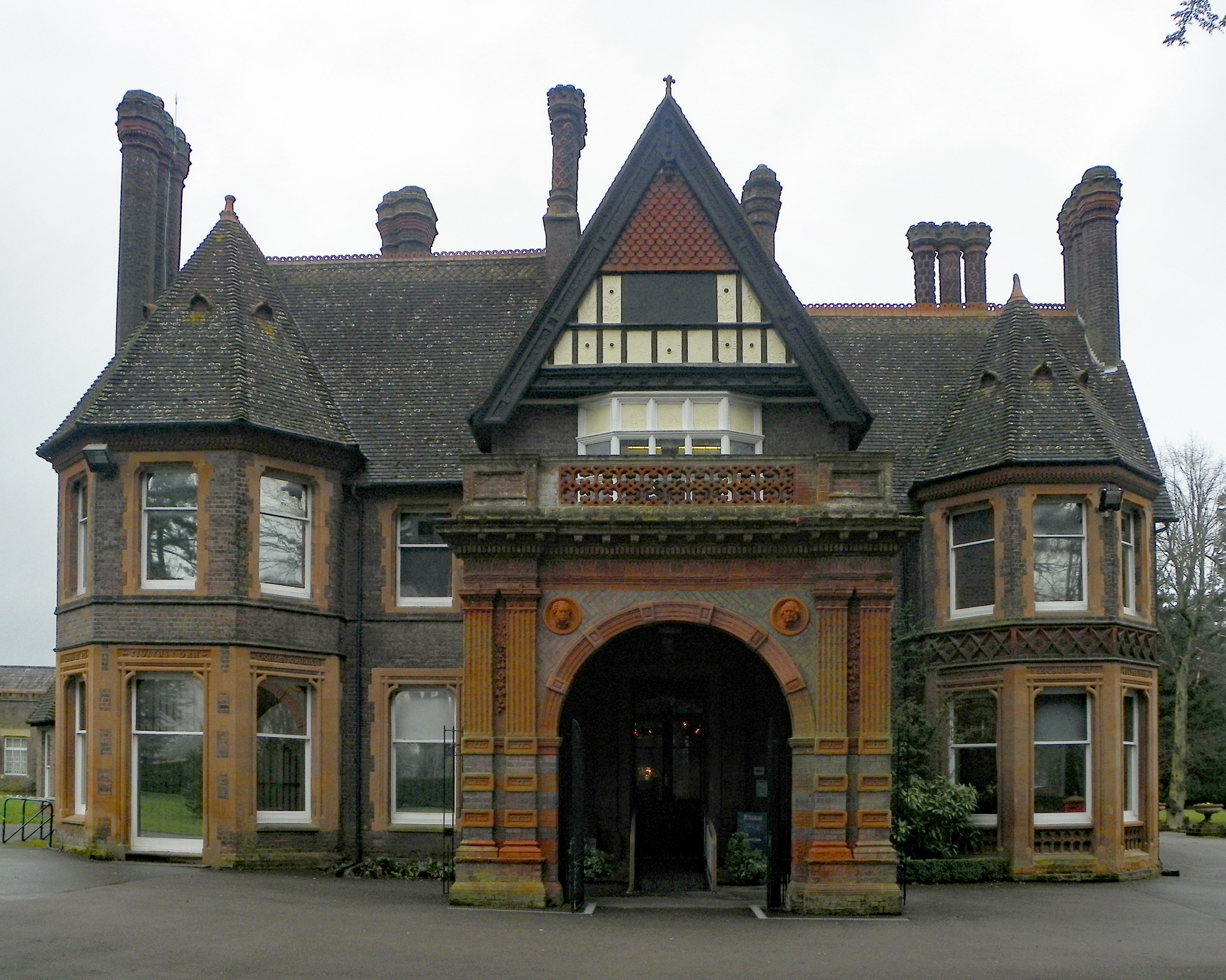
Wardown Park Museum – one of two museums run by Luton Culture

- Dunstable Downs
- Leagrave Park
- Leighton Buzzard Light Railway
- The Hat Factory
- Luton Hoo
- Someries Castle
- Stockwood Discovery Centre
- Stockwood Park
- Wardown Park
- Wardown Park Museum
- Waulud's Bank
- Whipsnade Tree Cathedral
- Whipsnade Zoo
- Woburn Safari Park
- Woodside Farm and Wildfowl Park
- Wrest Park

== Recreation ==
=== Parks and open spaces ===
Luton has a variety of parks ranging from district parks, neighbourhood parks, local open space and leisure gardens.

==== Brantwood Park ====
In the 1880s, the land now known as Brantwood Park was an open field on the south side of Dallow. The site was purchased by the Town Council in 1894 for use as a recreation ground and there is reference to it as 'West Ward Recreation Ground' in a 1911-year book. It is reported as being one of the first two recreation grounds in Luton; the other being East Ward Recreation Ground, now known as Manor Park.

==== Kidney Wood ====
Kidney Wood is ancient semi-natural woodland on the southern edge of Luton that has been identified as a County Wildlife Site. The wood was purchased by Luton Borough Council as an area of public open space. The council seeks to maintain and enhance the nature conservation interest of Kidney Wood, including its habitats while allowing public access for informal recreation including play. Kidney Wood includes a way marked nature trail and play dells.

==== Memorial Park ====
Sir Julius Wernher purchased the Luton Hoo Estate and the Manor of Luton from Madame de Falbe around 1903. He carried out substantial renovation works to the Manor and grounds. On his death in 1912 the estate passed to Lady Ludlow. Lady Ludlow presented the Park to the people of Luton on 12 June 1920, in memory of her son Alex Piggott Werner, who was killed in action during the First World War. The site is officially named Luton Hoo Memorial Park. Council records state that the area was purchased under the Statutory Powers of the Public Health Acts.

==== Stockwood Park ====
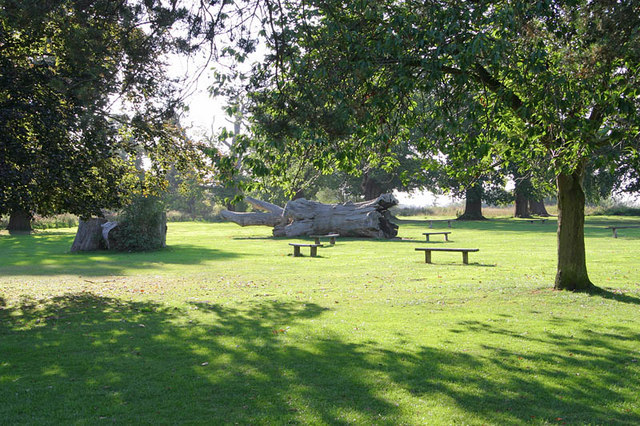
Stockwood Park, Luton

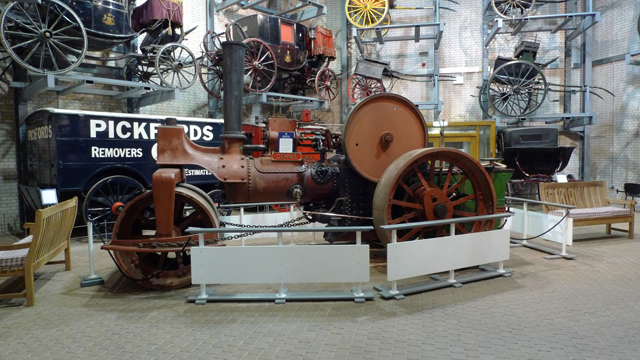
Part of the Mossman Collection.

Stockwood Park is a large municipal park near Junction 10 of the M1. Located in the park is Stockwood Discovery Centre, a free museum that houses Luton local social history, archaeology and geology. The collection of rural crafts and trades held at Stockwood Discovery Centre was amassed by Thomas Wyatt Bagshawe, who was a notable local historian and a leading authority on folk life.

The park has an athletics track, an 18-hole golf course, several rugby and football pitches and areas of open space. Stockwood park is also home to stockwood park RFC, a local amateur rugby team. The park was originally the estate and grounds to Stockwood house, which was demolished in 1964. The museum includes the Mossman Collection of horse-drawn vehicles, which is the largest and most significant vehicle collection of its kind in the country, including originals from the 18th, 19th and 20th centuries.

==== Wardown Park ====
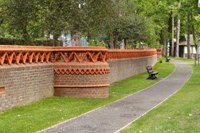
The Daisy-Chain Wall in Wardown Park.

Wardown Park is situated on the River Lea in Luton. The park has sporting facilities, is home to the Wardown Park Museum and contains formal gardens. The park is located between Old Bedford Road and the A6, New Bedford Road and is within walking distance of the town centre. The park houses Wardown House Museum and Gallery, previously known as Luton Museum and Art Gallery, in a large Victorian mansion. The museum collection focuses on the traditional crafts and industry of Luton and Bedfordshire, notably lace making and hatmaking. There are samples of local lace from as early as the 17th century.

=== Shopping ===
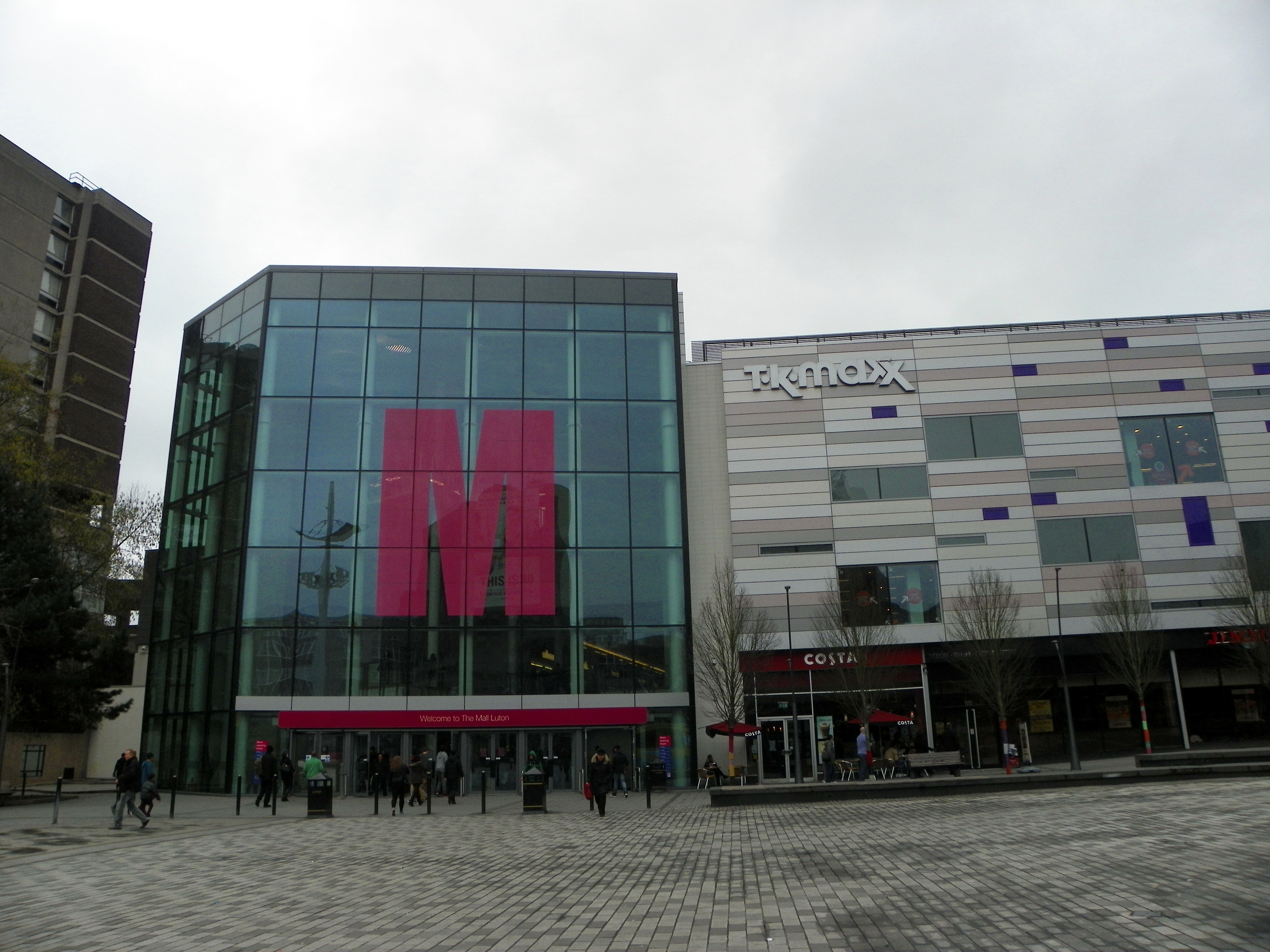
The main shopping destination in Luton's town centre, then known as The Mall Luton, pictured in 2013.

The main shopping area in Luton is centred on a shopping centre. It has changed names many times over the years, and is currently called Frasers Plus Luton. Built in the 1960s and 70s and opened as an Arndale Centre, construction of the shopping centre led to the demolition of a number of the older buildings in the town centre, including the Plait Halls, a Victorian covered market building with an iron and glass roof. Shops and businesses in the remaining streets, particularly in the roads around Cheapside and in High Town, have been in decline ever since. George Street, on the south side of the Arndale, was pedestrianised in the 1990s.

The shopping centre had some construction and re-design work done to it over the 2011/12 period, with a new square built to be used for leisure events, as well as a number of new food restaurants. Contained within the main shopping centre is the market, which contains butchers, fishmongers, fruit and veg, hairdressers, tattoo parlours, ice cream, a flower stall, T-shirt printing and the market's original sewing shop for clothes alterations and repairs as well as eating places.

Another major shopping area is Bury Park where there are shops catering to Luton's ethnic minorities.

=== Sport ===
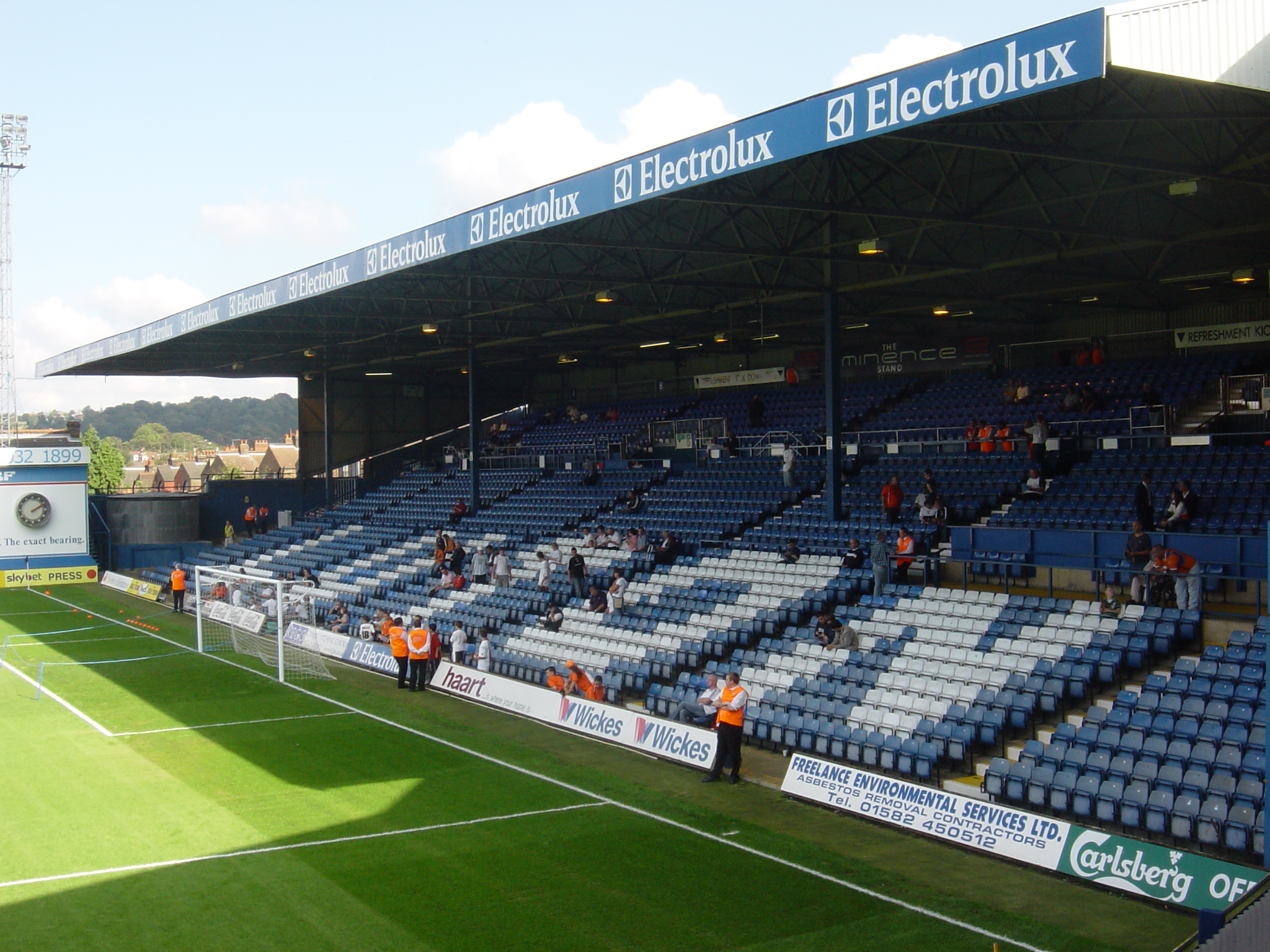
Kenilworth Stand at Kenilworth Road, home to Luton Town Football Club

Luton has a wide range of sports clubs. It is the home town of Luton Town Football Club, which has had several spells in the top flight of the English league as well as a League Cup triumph in 1988. They play at Kenilworth Road, their home since 1905, with a new larger capacity stadium known as Power Court under construction. Their nickname, 'The Hatters', dates back to when Luton had a substantial millinery industry, and their logo is based on the town's coat of arms.

Bedfordshire County Cricket Club is based at Wardown Park and is one of the county clubs which make up the Minor Counties in the English domestic cricket structure, representing the historic county of Bedfordshire. Luton Rugby Club are a local rugby union club based on Newlands Road, by the M1 motorway just outside Stockwood Park, who play in London 1 North. Speedway racing was once staged at Luton Stadium from 1934 to 1937.

== Twin towns ==
Luton participates in international town twinning; its partners are:

| Country | Place | State/Region | Date |
|---|---|---|---|
| Germany | Bergisch Gladbach | North Rhine-Westphalia | 1956 |
| France | Bourgoin-Jallieu | Auvergne-Rhône-Alpes | 1956 |
| Sweden | Eskilstuna | Södermanland | 1949 |
| Germany | Berlin-Spandau | Berlin | 1959 |
| Germany | Wolfsburg | Lower Saxony | 1950 |

== Notable people ==
People who were born in Luton or are associated with the town.

=== By birth ===
- Mick Abrahams, guitarist for Jethro Tull
- Keshi Anderson, footballer
- David Arnold, composer
- Emily Atack, actress
- John Badham, film director
- Lewis Baker, footballer
- Clive Barker, sculptor and artist
- Jonathan Barnbrook, graphic designer and typographer
- Josh Bassett, rugby player
- Kevin Blackwell, goalkeeper and football manager
- Dean Brill, footballer
- Charles Bronson, born Michael Peterson, prisoner
- William Brown, footballer
- Clive Bunker, drummer for Jethro Tull
- Danny Cannon, screenwriter, director and producer
- Gerald Anthony Coles, artist
- Natasha Collins, actress and television presenter
- Andy Day, television presenter
- Steve Dillon, comic artist
- Kerry Dixon, footballer
- Stacey Dooley, journalist, television presenter and Strictly Come Dancing winner
- Jamal Edwards, entrepreneur, author, director, DJ and founder of SB.TV
- Jonathan Edwards, footballer
- Kevin Foley, footballer
- Sean Gallagher, actor
- Gurlaine Kaur Garcha, actor
- Liam George, footballer
- John Hagan, 8th master chief petty officer, US Navy
- Arthur Hailey, novelist
- Nadiya Hussain, The Great British Bake Off winner
- Neil Jackson, actor
- Sharna Jackson, children's writer
- James Justin, footballer
- Stephen Kelman, novelist
- Jamal Lewis, footballer
- Stuart Lewis-Evans, Formula One driver
- Sean Maguire, footballer
- Frederick Mander, General Secretary of the NUT
- Sarfraz Manzoor, journalist and author
- Herbert Moody, footballer
- Monty Panesar, cricketer
- David Price, cricketer
- Phil Read, motorcycle racer
- David Renwick, scriptwriter
- Stu Riddle, footballer
- Tommy Robinson, born Stephen Yaxley-Lennon, political activist
- Lee Ross, actor
- Billy Schwer, boxer
- Andy Selway, drummer
- Junior Simpson, comedian
- Paul Sinha, comedian and quizzer
- Zena Skinner, television chef and author
- Myles Smith, singer
- Steven M Smith, biologist
- Will Smith, cricketer
- David Stoten, storyboard artist
- Jordan Thomas, World and European karate champion
- Mark Titchner, artist
- UK Decay, band
- Richard Wiseman, psychologist
- Jamie Woolford, rock musician for The Stereo, Animal Chin and Let Go
- Paul Young, pop rock singer
- Zuby, rapper

=== By association ===
- Rodney Bewes, actor
- Mo Chaudry, entrepreneur
- Diana Dors, actress
- Ian Dury, singer
- John Hegley, poet
- Hilda Hewlett, UK's first licensed woman pilot
- Alec Jeffreys, geneticist
- Sarfraz Manzoor, author and columnist, The Guardian
- Eric Morecambe, entertainer
- Elizabeth Price, artist
- Colin Salmon, actor
- Andrew Tate, British-American ex-kickboxer and Internet personality

== Freedom of the Borough ==
The following people and military units have received the Freedom of the Borough of Luton.

=== Individuals ===
- John Still: 15 January 2015.
- Bill McKenzie, Baron McKenzie of Luton: 15 January 2015.
- Viv Dunnington: 15 January 2015.

== See also ==
- List of places in Luton
- List of schools in Luton
- List of unitary authorities of England
- List of urban areas in the United Kingdom
- Demographics of Luton
- Economy of Luton
- History of Luton
- Politics in Luton
- Transport in Luton
- Luton power station
