= Tornadoes of 1981 =

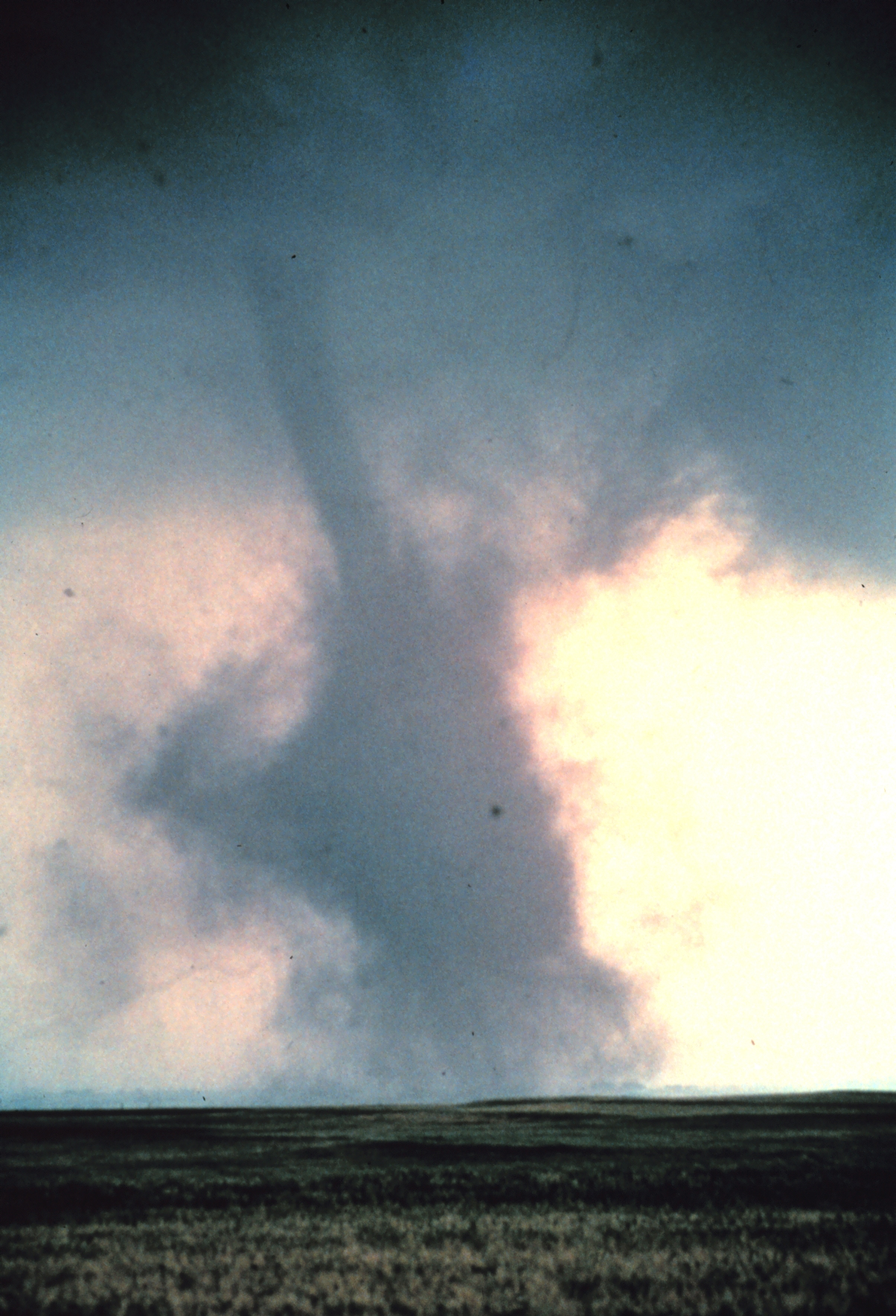
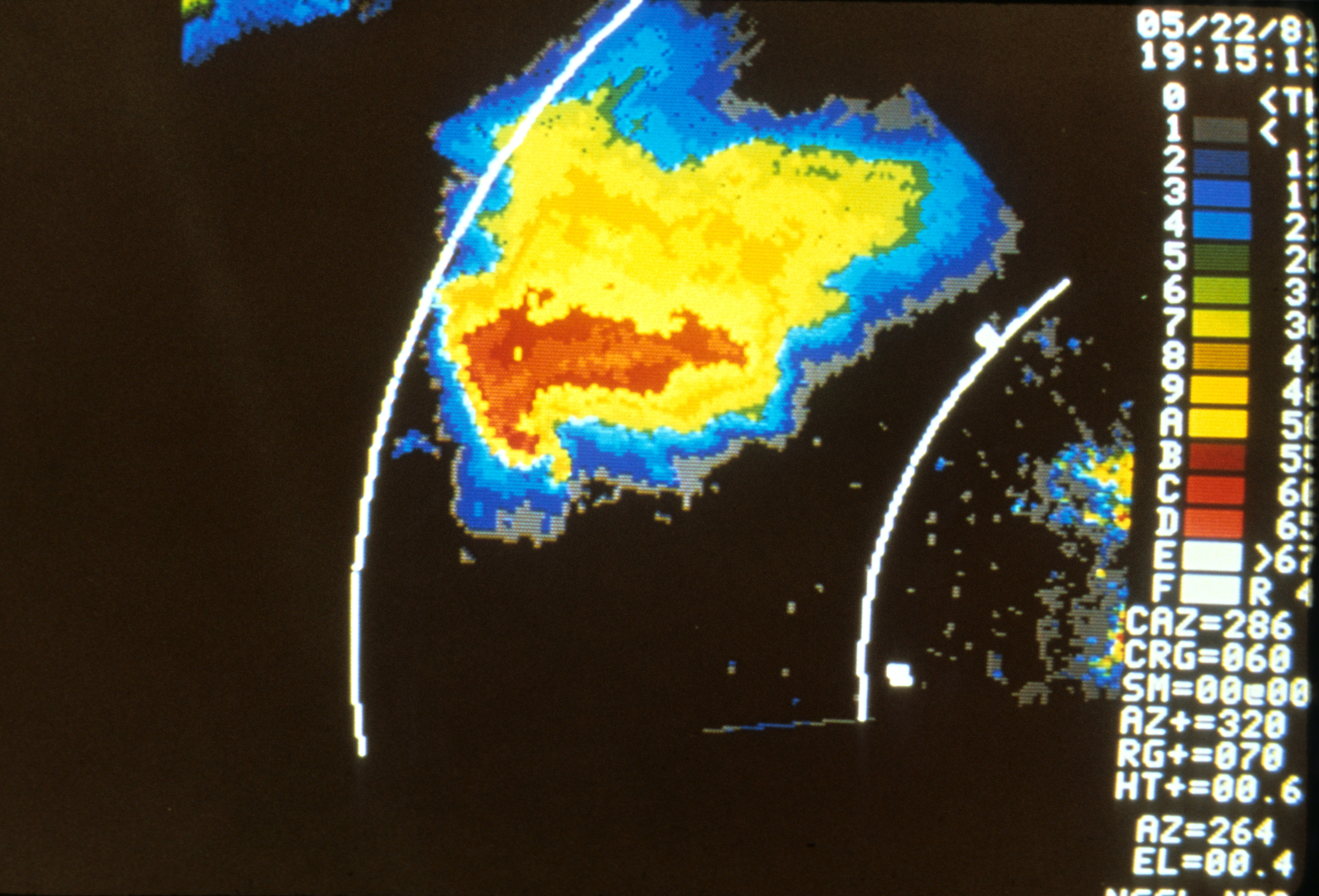
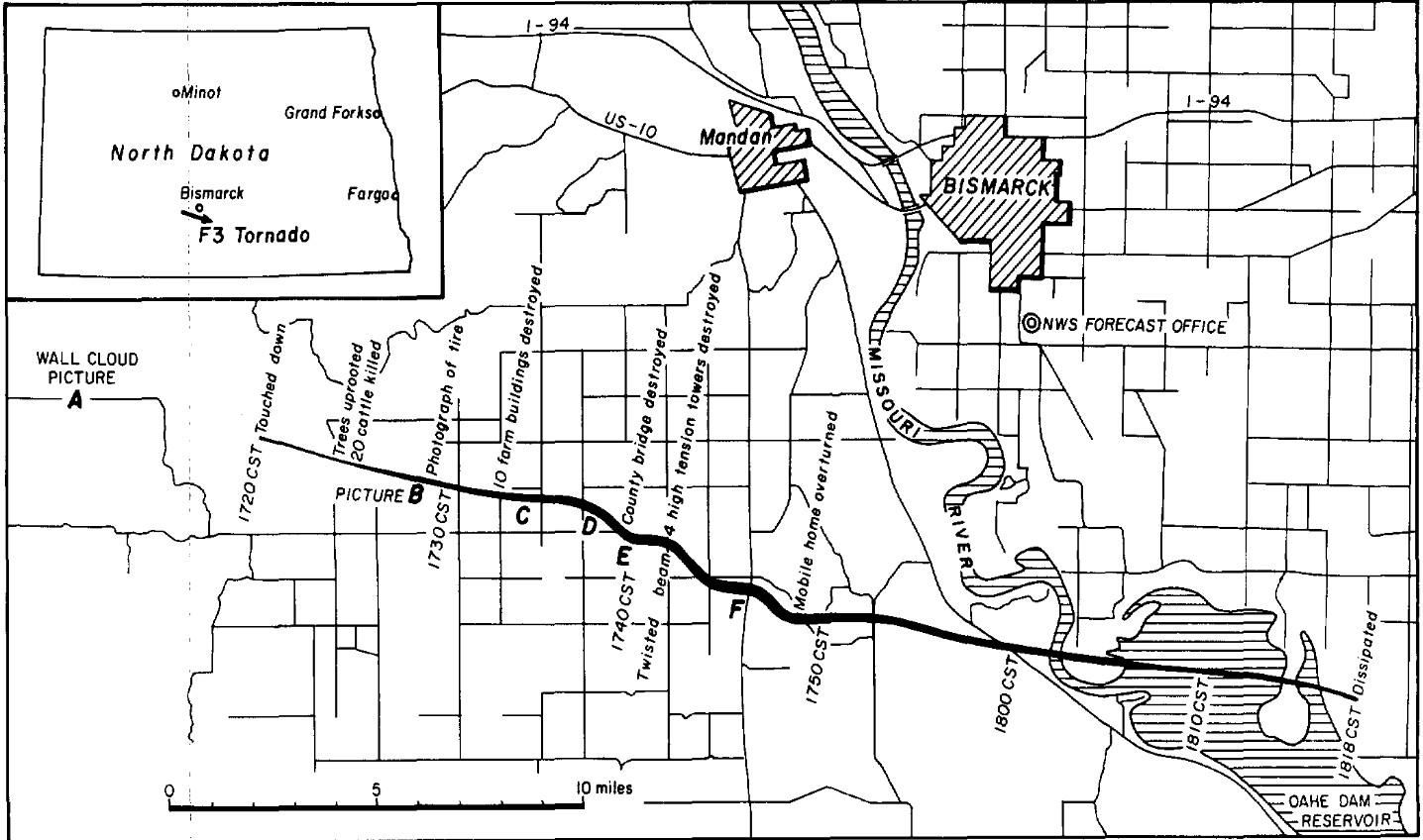
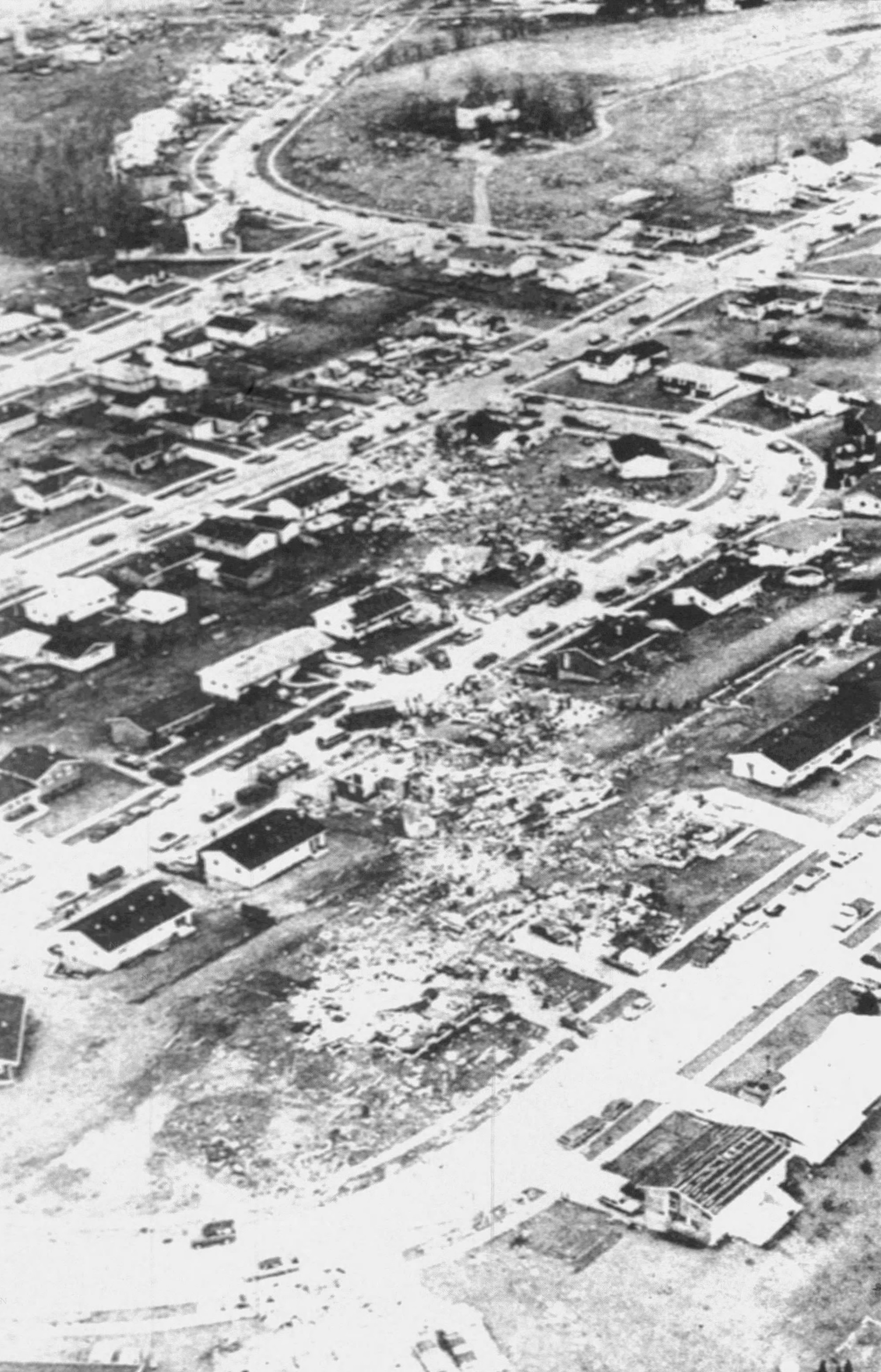
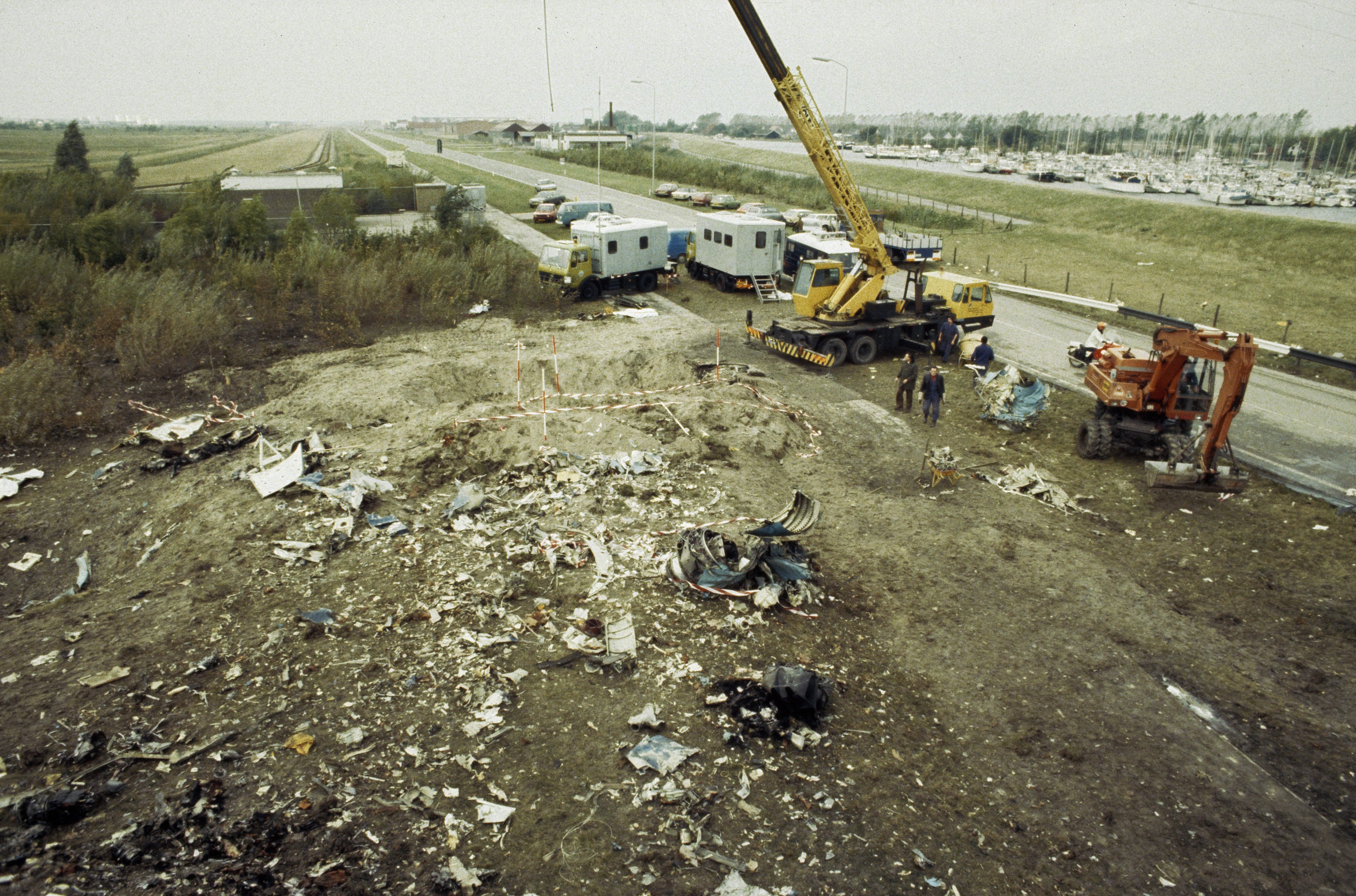
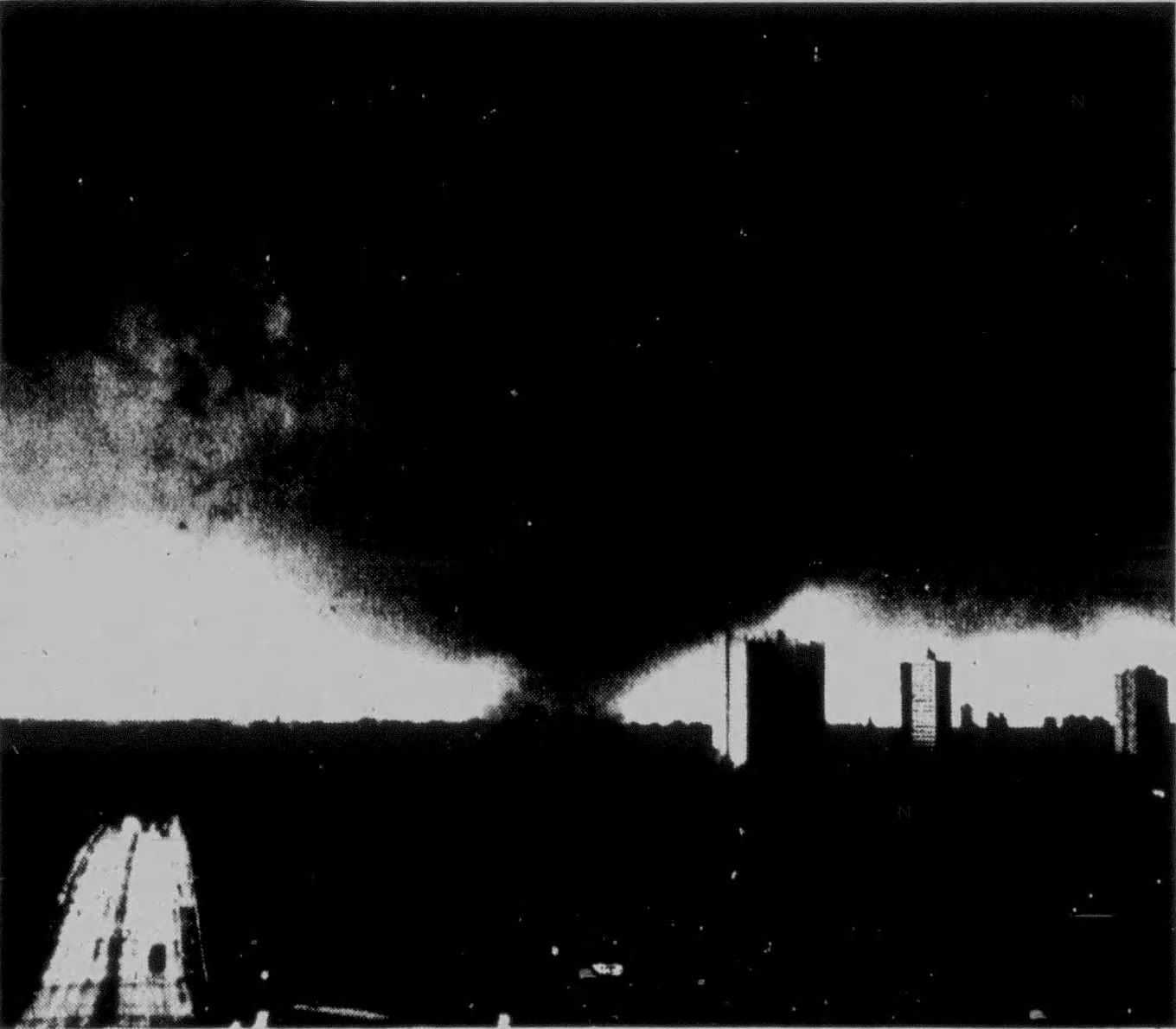
- Clockwise from top: An F2 tornado near Cordell, Oklahoma on May 22; the path of an F3 tornado that passed south of Bismarck, North Dakota on July 30; the site of the NLM CityHopper Flight 431 plane crash, following a tornado-related accident on October 6; a large F3 tornado approaching Minneapolis, Minnesota on June 14; an aerial view of West Bend, Wisconsin, following an anticyclonic F4 tornado on April 4; weather radar hook echo image of an F4 tornado near Binger, Oklahoma on May 22
- Timespan: January–December 1981
Maximum rated tornado
F4 tornado
- List
  – Lyndon, Illinois
  on March 29
  – Granite City–Edwardsville, Illinois
  on April 3
  – West Bend, Wisconsin
  on April 4
  – East Prairie, Missouri
  on April 22
  – Emberson, Texas
  on May 13
  – Okemah, Oklahoma
  on May 17
  – Binger–Scott, Oklahoma
  on May 22
- Tornadoes in U.S.: 782
- Damage (U.S.): >$57.8 million
- Fatalities (U.S.): 24
- Fatalities (worldwide): >24

This page documents the tornadoes and tornado outbreaks of 1981, primarily in the United States. Most tornadoes form in the U.S., although some events may take place internationally. Tornado statistics for older years like this often appear significantly lower than modern years due to fewer reports or confirmed tornadoes.

== Synopsis ==
Fatal United States tornadoes in 1981
- Approximate touchdown location of killer tornadoes in 1981 Summary of tornadoes: February 10 – Texas (1 death); February 11 – North Carolina (1 death); March 30 – North Carolina, Virginia (1 death); April 1 – Alabama (2 deaths); April 4 – Wisconsin (3 deaths); April 19 – Oklahoma (5 deaths); April 22 – Missouri (1 death); April 22 – Missouri (1 death); April 30 – Oklahoma (1 death); June 13 – Ohio (4 deaths); June 14 – Minnesota (1 death); June 19 – Kansas (1 death); June 21 – Missouri (1 death); June 21 – Illinois (1 death); Total fatalities: 24

Numbers for 1981 were below average, both in terms of number of tornadoes and number of fatalities.

== Events ==
Confirmed tornadoes by Fujita rating
FU	F0	F1	F2	F3	F4	F5	Total
0	283	320	149	23	7	0	782

== January ==
Only two tornadoes touched down in January, both were rated F0 and took place in California.

== February ==
There were 25 tornadoes confirmed in the U.S. in February, injuring 82 people.

=== February 10–11 ===
The first fatal tornadoes of the year occurred during a relatively small outbreak between February 10 and 11. Two F2 tornadoes, one in Walker County, Texas and the other in Hoke/Cumberland County, North Carolina, killed one person each.

Confirmed tornadoes by Fujita rating
FU	F0	F1	F2	F3	F4	F5	Total
0	0	0	2	0	0	0	2

== March ==
There were 33 tornadoes confirmed in the U.S. in March.

=== March 30 ===
One person was killed by an F2 tornado in Hertford County, North Carolina.

== April ==
There were 84 tornadoes confirmed in the U.S. in April. Most of the year's fatalities took place during the month, with 13 people perishing.

=== April 3 ===
At approximately 10:55 PM, a tornado—later determined to be an F4—touched down north of Wilson Park in Granite City, Illinois, and began tracking northeast. As it strengthened, it damaged or destroyed 31 homes in northeast Granite before proceeding to Pontoon Beach, where it severely damaged 20 more mobile homes and residences. According to reports, it sheared trees, moved/overturned several vehicles, and reportedly drove a pair of hand-hedge trimmers into a telephone pole.

The tornado lifted for a short period before touching back down east of the intersection of Interstate 270 and Illinois Route 157, overturning and damaging two tractor trailers.

It briefly lifted again—still moving northeast—before touching back down and striking Edwardsville, Illinois, where it severely damaged or destroyed residences and businesses. Reports described a transformer being blown about 1/2 of a block, boards and limbs being driven/embedded into walls and windshields, as well as pieces of linoleum being driven underneath the molding over the vinyl roof of a car.

The strength of the circulation then wavered before dissipating near the northern edge of Edwardsville.

Between Granite City and Edwardsville, the tornado tracked approximately 12 miles northeast, reaching a peak width of 567 yards. There were 32 direct injuries, and 0 fatalities reported. The tornado caused a total of $25M in property damage.

=== April 4 ===
FU	F0	F1	F2	F3	F4	F5
0	1	2	1	0	1	0

A rare anticyclonic tornado struck West Bend, Wisconsin at F4 intensity, killing three people and injuring 53 others. It was part of a small outbreak that produced five tornadoes with 10 additional injuries also taking place.

=== April 19 ===
Five people were killed in Bixby, Oklahoma by an F3 tornado.

== May ==
There were 187 tornadoes in the US in May.

=== May 17 ===
An F4 tornado tracked near Okemah, Oklahoma, injuring two people.

=== May 22–23 ===
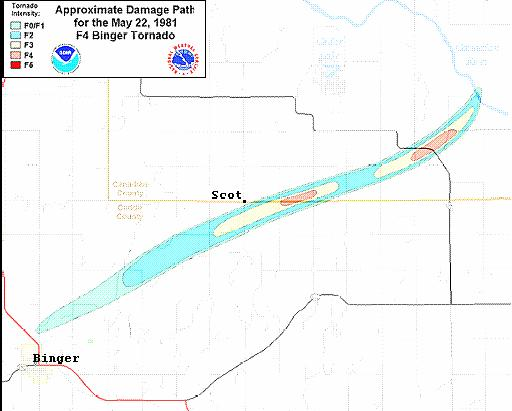
The path of an F4 tornado near Binger, Oklahoma.

FU	F0	F1	F2	F3	F4	F5
0	15	14	11	2	1	0

An outbreak of 43 tornadoes occurred in areas from Western Oklahoma to Central Iowa. A large F4 tornado struck Scott, Oklahoma northeast of Binger. The outbreak injured 12 people, but there were no fatalities.

== June ==
There were 223 tornadoes in the US in June, resulting in eight fatalities.

=== June 3 ===
A small tornado outbreak affected Colorado, including the Denver metro area.

=== June 13 ===
An F3 tornado killed four people in Cardington, Ohio.

== July ==
There were 98 tornadoes in the US in July.

=== July 30 ===
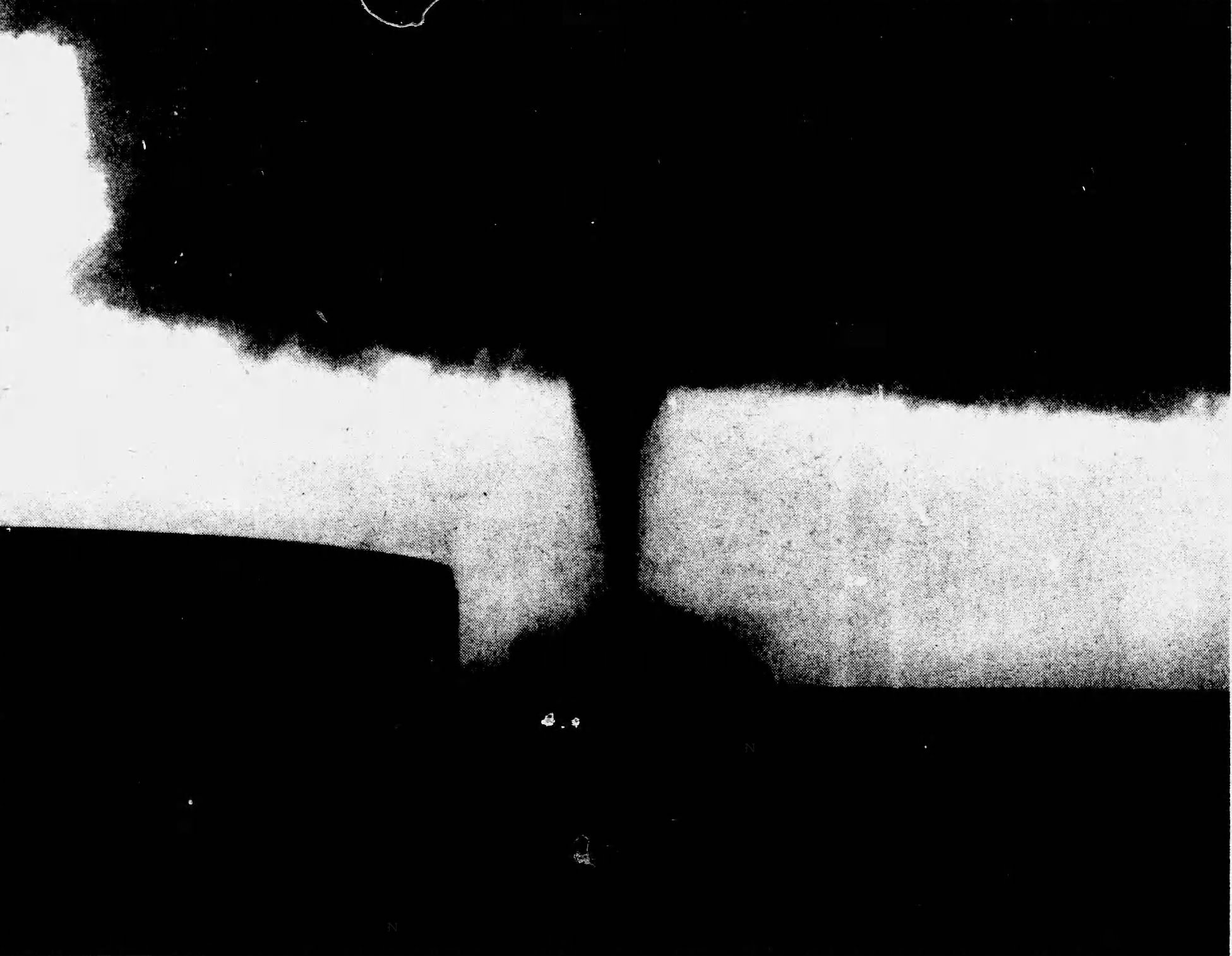
An F3 tornado south of Bismark.

An F3 tornado in North Dakota tracked through Bismarck and Mandan without causing any fatalities or injuries.

== August ==
There were 64 tornadoes in the US in August.

== September ==
There were 26 tornadoes in the US in September.

== October ==
There were 32 tornadoes in the US in October.

=== October 2 (Italy) ===
Two tornadoes touched down in Italy, including one in Ostia Antica that injured 5 people, while causing significant damage to buildings and scattering debris long distances.

Confirmed tornadoes by Fujita rating
FU	F0	F1	F2	F3	F4	F5	Total
2	0	0	0	0	0	0	2

=== October 6 (Netherlands) ===
A damaging FUntornado caused significant damage to buildings in Moerdijk, Netherlands. As the tornado was dissipating, NLM CityHopper Flight 431 flew unknowingly into the tornado and crashed, causing 17 direct fatalities and 1 direct death making a total 18 casualties; all 17 on board were killed as well as one on-ground fatality, caused by a cardiac arrest.

=== October 11–12 (Czech Republic & Denmark) ===
An F2 tornado struck the towns Rájec-Jestřebí & Karolín in Czech Republic along a 3 km path. The next day, An F2 tornado destroyed a barn in Lemvig Municipality in Denmark.

Confirmed tornadoes by Fujita rating
FU	F0	F1	F2	F3	F4	F5	Total
0	0	0	2	0	0	0	2

== November ==
There were seven tornadoes in the US in November.

=== November 1 (Poland) ===
An F2 tornado caused heavy damages to a forest in Blizyn.

=== November 23–24 (UK, Denmark & Germany) ===
A large tornado outbreak occurred across the UK, Denmark and Germany, with a vast majority occurring in the UK, mainly in central England and Wales. About 107 tornadoes were reported to have touched down in what remains the largest tornado outbreak in European history. 104 tornadoes touched down in the United Kingdom during a span of less than 6 hours on November 23. On the following day, 3 tornadoes were reported in Denmark and Germany combined.

Confirmed tornadoes by Fujita rating
FU	F0	F1	F2	F3	F4	F5	Total
22	25	58	2	0	0	0	107

== December ==
There was one tornado in the US in December.

== See also ==
- Tornado
  - Tornadoes by year
  - Tornado records
  - Tornado climatology
  - Tornado myths
- List of tornado outbreaks
  - List of F5 and EF5 tornadoes
  - List of North American tornadoes and tornado outbreaks
  - List of 21st-century Canadian tornadoes and tornado outbreaks
  - List of European tornadoes and tornado outbreaks
  - List of tornadoes and tornado outbreaks in Asia
  - List of Southern Hemisphere tornadoes and tornado outbreaks
  - List of tornadoes striking downtown areas
- Tornado intensity
  - Fujita scale
  - Enhanced Fujita scale
