= 2018–19 European winter =

Winter

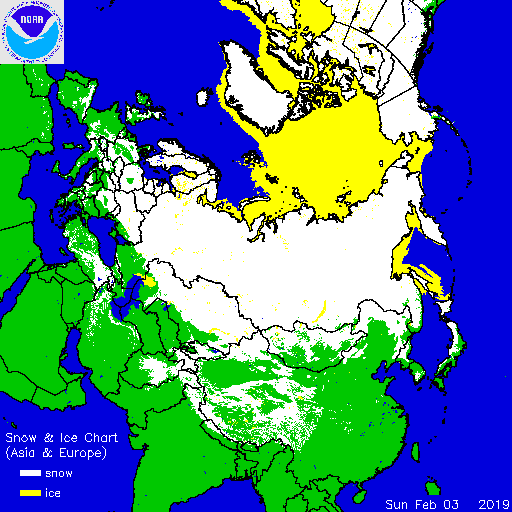
- Map of Europe and Asia snow cover on 3 February 2019.

Meteorological history
- Formed: 21 December 2018 (Note: This is when astronomical winter begins. Meteorological winter began on 1 December.)
- Dissipated: 20 March 2019 (Note: This is when astronomical winter ends. Meteorological winter ended on 1 March.)

Winter season
- Max. snowfall: 210 centimetres (83 in) on 6 January in Tauplitzalm, Styria, Austria

The 2018–19 European winter occurred from late 2018 to early 2019. Notable events included the early snows in Spain and intense flooding in Italy, in cities such as Venice, the intense snow storms which affected central Europe in January, the snow storms in Greece over the New Year period, as well as the end of February. As well as severe winter weather, there was also exceptional warmth across western Europe in the last week of February. Parts of France had their warmest February day on record, with temperatures up to 28.1 °C (82.6 °F) at Eus on the 27th. Many places in the United Kingdom also broke temperature records, including the national record in Kew Gardens, at 21.2 °C (70.2 °F) on the 26th. Unlike previous winters, a developing El Niño was expected to influence weather patterns across Europe, although the effect is not fully known.

Officially, winter 2018–19 began in the Northern Hemisphere on the winter solstice, which in 2018 occurred on 21 December 2018, and ended at the March equinox, which in 2019 occurred on 20 March 2019. Based on the meteorological definition, the first day of winter is 1 December and the last day 28 February.

== Forecasts ==
AccuWeather released its European forecast on 18 October 2018. They highlighted that conditions in North Western Europe and Western Scandinavia would be wet and unsettled, with frequent windstorms in the United Kingdom, Northern France and Western Norway. Similarly, Southeastern Europe was predicted to have occasional storms, with a swathe of warmer than average temperatures covering most of Portugal and Spain, as well as Italy and extending as far east as South Western Ukraine. Most of Eastern Europe, including parts of Scandinavia were predicted to have 'cold shots', this area extended from eastern Sweden down to Ukraine.

The most active part of the storm season was predicted to be from January to February, with such cities as Manchester, UK Belfast, UK and Glasgow, UK at the highest risk of impacts from storms. A cold spell with the severity of that of earlier in 2018, The beast from the east, was not expected. Accuweather predicted that in December, storms would be most frequent in Northern Spain and France. Despite predicting above normal rainfall, they didn't expect extreme flooding which was seen in the winter of 2013–14. Storms were predicted to continue into March and April. Unsettled weather was also predicted to last throughout much of the season for Germany, too. Despite unsettled weather in Northern Europe, lasting warmth was predicted in Southern Europe, with drought not being a concern as a result of early rainfall winter. Cold shots were predicted to reach as far east as Poland and the Czech Republic.

== Monthly Timeline ==
=== August ===
During the final week of August, temperatures started to rapidly decline across Northern, Western and Central Europe, with frosts in the UK and heavy snow in Austria and Germany accompanied by temperatures below freezing. In Austria, the city of Salzburg reported 5 cm (2.0 in), with nearby mountains reporting as much as 40 cm (16 in).

=== September ===
September 2018 saw the start of the Autumn season in Europe, with the first storms of the 2018–19 European windstorm season, Ex-Hurricane Helene striking western Europe on the 15th and 16th. The first named storm, Ali, affected the UK and Ireland on the 18th. Parts of Germany and the Netherlands experienced record cold toward the end of the month, with Germany recording a national record low for September of −5.0 °C (23.0 °F) in Nuremberg. In the Netherlands, De Bilt recorded the country's lowest maximum temperature for 23 September, reaching 10.9 °C (51.6 °F). Then later in the month, the 30th was the coldest September temperatures in the Netherlands for 47 years, with temperatures falling to −1.5 °C (29.3 °F). In the United Kingdom, Katesbridge in County Down, Northern Ireland recorded the coldest September temperature in the country since 2012, at −3.6 °C (25.5 °F). This was also the record low for Northern Ireland in September. However, this record was broken at the same location in 2020.

=== October ===
For most parts of the Alps, the first substantial snowfall of the season occurred on the 1st. Most areas received 20 cm (7.9 in) to 30 cm (12 in), but some areas received up to 40 cm (16 in). The snow line was as low as 1400 m.

From the 13th to the 15th, Ex-Hurricane Helene battered the Iberian peninsula with heavy rains up to 180 mm (7.1 in) in places, and winds gusting up to 110 mph (180 km/h).

Storm Adrian was a severe storm that affected Western Europe and Northern Africa from 27 October until 3 November. It brought heavy, flooding rains to Venice, Italy, with officials estimating that 75% of the city was underwater, with depths exceeding for only the 5th time in recorded history. The system brought winds of up to 117 mph (188 km/h). The system brought heavy snowfall to parts of France, with upper areas receiving up to 50 cm (20 in) with lower elevations seeing up to 15 cm (5.9 in)

There was also a cold snap in the United Kingdom at the end of the month, with temperatures as low as −9 °C (16 °F) at St Harmon, Wales on the 30th. This was the lowest reading in the UK in October since 1993. Halloween was then predicted to be one of the coldest on record since a temperature of −10.6 °C (12.9 °F) was recorded in 1926. This period also saw heavy snowfall across North East England and Southern Scotland, with some places experiencing a 'white halloween' and the coldest day time temperatures in October since the 2008 cold snap. Depths of up to 10 cm (3.9 in) were recorded. Overall, the UK recorded its coldest October since 2012.

=== November ===
Weather during November was benign, with little noteworthy occurrences. However, there were 3 named storms, Beatriz, Carlos and Diana, which were named by the meteorological agencies of France, Spain and Portugal. The most severe of these storms was Diana, which produced a wind gust of 112 mph (180 km/h) at Cairngorm, United Kingdom. Over Scandinavia, there was an unusual lack of snow, especially over Lapland.

=== December ===
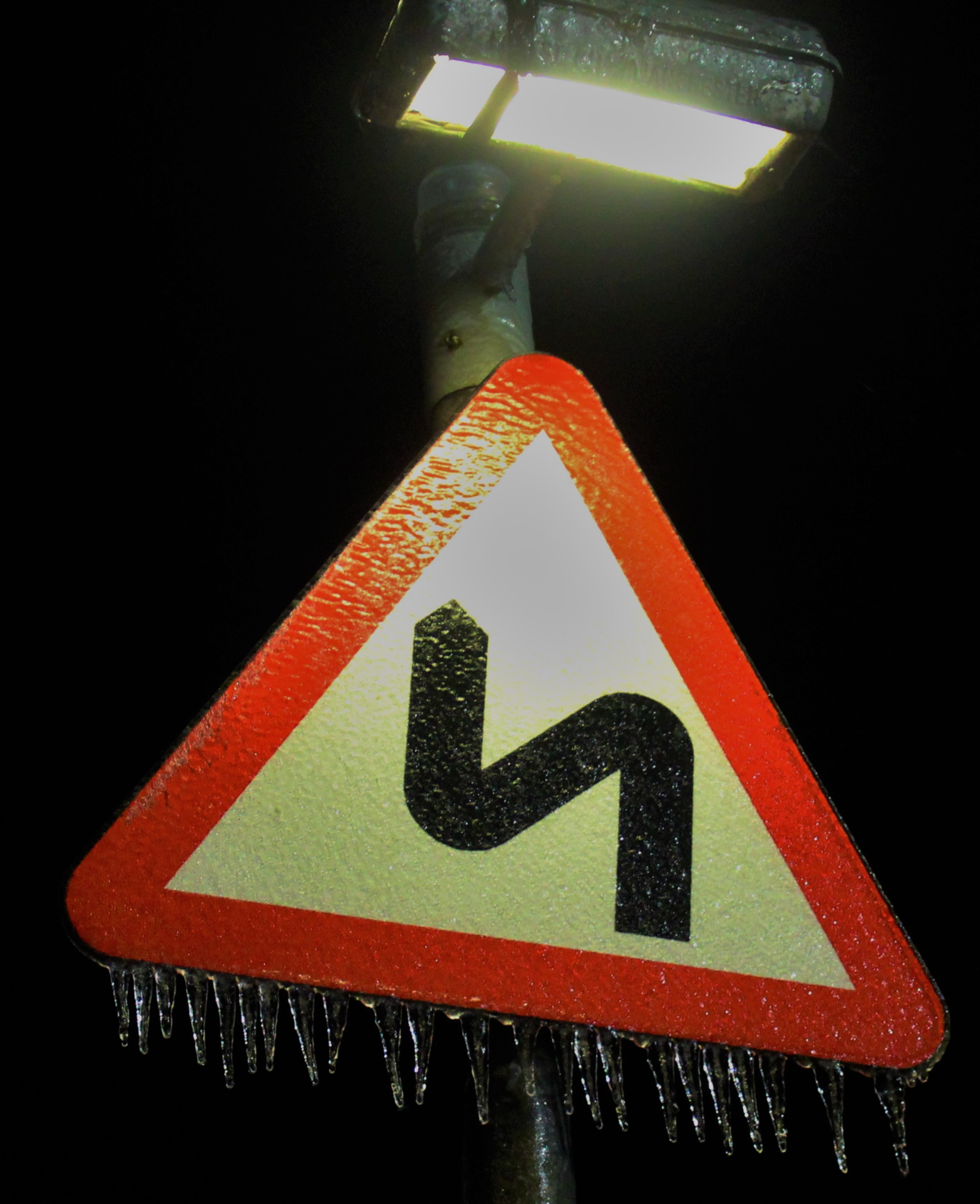
Ice accretion on a road sign left behind by heavy freezing rain from Storm Deirdre in Sheffield

The lack of snow that prevailed throughout Scandinavia in November continued into December. However, snow finally fell on the 12th, with places such as Rovaniemi reporting up to 21 cm (8.3 in). Storm Deirdre affected the United Kingdom on the 15th and brought a rare spell of freezing rain to many areas. It also brought heavy snow and rain to places, with some areas of Scotland receiving up to 50 cm (20 in).

=== January ===
The major snowfalls occurred from 2 to 9 January 2019 across central and southern Europe, killing at least 13 people. Schools in Austria were closed, and people were advised to clear their roofs of snow after several buildings collapsed. Snow also blanketed the Greek capital, Athens for the first time in years and schools were forced to close. An avalanche in Norway, measuring 990 ft (11,900 in) left 4 people presumed dead. The system also brought very low temperatures too, as low as −20 °C (−4 °F) in Northern Greece and −24 °C (−11 °F) in Romania. The maximum depth of snow was 210 cm (83 in) Tauplitzalm, Styria, Austria on the 6th Further heavy snow on the 10th and 11th lead to a snow depth of 110 cm (43 in) in Bavaria, Germany, with a further 17 dead. Heavy snow was also reported in Macedonia and in Albania. The winter storms had over 200 flights cancelled, and some areas of Austria declaring a catastrophe. After the snowstorms in central Europe had subsided, snowfall then hit the UK, France and the Netherlands on the 22nd, with depths reaching 10 cm (3.9 in) to 15 cm (5.9 in) in places. At the end of the month, a cold spell set in, in the UK and Ireland, as well as bringing low temperatures, it also brought disruptive snowfall. On the 30th, heavy snow struck North West England overnight (29th–30th), and heavy snow continued to fall until around 11am. The heavy snow forced 214 schools to close as well as both Liverpool and Manchester airports, which closed for 2 hours. Depths of 20 cm (7.9 in) to 30 cm (12 in) were reported after the snowfall. In many places in the UK, temperatures plummeted below −10 °C (14 °F) over the course of the cold snap with temperatures in all areas well below freezing by day.

=== February ===
The month started cold, with temperatures down to −16 °C (3 °F) in the UK, with widespread snow cover from January lasting for the first few days. There were 4 windstorms named by the French, Spanish and Portuguese meteorological associations. They were Helena, Isaias, Julia and Kyllian. The most severe of these was Helena, which produced a wind gust of 114 mph (183 km/h) in France. From mid-month, a spell of exceptionally warm weather began across western Europe, primarily affecting France and the UK. In the UK, records were first broken in Scotland, on the 21st, Aboyne reached 18.3 °C (64.9 °F), beating the previous record of 17.9 °C (64.2 °F) from 1897. On the 22nd, a new record was set in Wales, with 18.1 °C (64.6 °F) at Gogerddan. This record was then beaten again on the 24th, with 19.1 °C (66.4 °F) also at Gogerddan. On the 25th, the UK national record was broken along with the Welsh record, again, with 20.6 °C (69.1 °F) at Trawsgoed, Wales. This was the first time that 20.0 °C (68.0 °F) had been reached in February in the UK. The English record was also broken this day, with 20.4 °C (68.7 °F) at Northolt, London. The 26th then broke the UK wide record again, as well as the English and Welsh records too. The temperature reached 21.2 °C (70.2 °F) at Kew Gardens, England and 20.8 °C (69.4 °F) in Porthmadog, Wales. During this spell, Northern Ireland was the only UK country not to set a new record, the current record was set in 1998. In France, extreme temperatures were exceptionally high for the season too, with temperatures reaching highs of 28.1 °C (82.6 °F) at Eus on the 27th. Although some places did set new temperature records, the national record remains at 31.2 °C (88.2 °F) on 29 February 1960.

=== March ===
During March, there were two named storms, Laura and Gareth. Laura was more severe in terms of wind, as a gust of 152 mph (245 km/h) was reported in France. Storm Gareth, named by the UK Met Office, was more remarkable in terms of rainfall, 137 mm of rain was reported as falling in Capel Curig, Wales in just a few hours. Despite the prolonged drought preceding the heavy rainfall, cities such as York and Ross-on-Wye flooded. Snow was also reported in locations such as Dunblane, Scotland.

=== April ===
The last major snow storm of the season occurred over the United Kingdom on 4 April 2019. Up to 40 cm (16 in) of snow was reported as falling in Northern England and Scotland, with temperatures well below normal for the time of year.

=== May ===
Early May brought cold and snow back to many parts of the United Kingdom, France and Germany. With snow falling in places it had never fell in the month of May before. For example, snow was recorded as lying at Côte d’Azur for the first time in May. Snowfall was also widely recorded across parts of the United Kingdom, even to relatively low levels, with some places seeing up to 10 cm (3.9 in) on 7 May. Germany also saw some snowfall on 4 May, with depths exceeding 20 cm (7.9 in) in some areas. The snowfall was coupled with unusually low temperatures. Paris had its coldest May in 22 years. Parts of the UK recorded the lowest May temperatures since 1981, as low as −6.2 °C (20.8 °F) in Kinbrace, Scotland. The Early May Bank holiday was also the coldest on record in the UK, with temperatures as low as −5 °C (23 °F).

== Snow cover and sea ice advancement ==
=== Snow cover ===
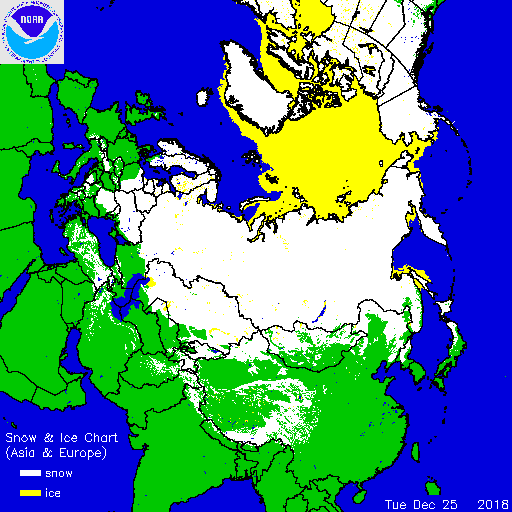
European snow cover on Christmas Day 2018.

The first snow cover of the season was reported on Tuesday 21 August, across eastern parts of Russia. However, this was temporary as by the 23rd, this snow had melted, although a few small patches remained. Snow cover was observed again across parts of Eastern Russia on the 6 and 7 September. This snow did melt in some places however, in a small area of Siberia, this snow cover persisted throughout the month. The first snow cover of the season started to appear in Norway and Sweden on 17 September. On 5 October, snow cover became widespread over northern parts of Finland, Sweden and Norway, as well as far North Eastern Russia and Northern Mongolia. On the 7th, snow cover became widespread across Iceland. By 12 October, snow cover across Northern Parts of Scandinavia had mainly melted, but snow cover across far east and north Russia become much more widespread. By the 17th, snow cover, although patchy, had advanced into central western Russia, with most of Scandinavia snow free again. By the 26th, the first snow cover started to appear of the United Kingdom and more general snow cover over most of Russia and Scandinavia. By 26 November, most of Russia was snow covered as well as Scandinavia. Snow cover extended into Ukraine and Belarus too, with widespread snow cover across the alps. By 16 December, snow covered all of Russia and Scandinavia, as well as most of Eastern Europe and extending into France and the UK. By 19 February, snow cover started receding across Scandinavia and Eastern Europe. Parts of south eastern Russia start to lose their snow cover on 1 March. By 31 March, snow cover was lost across western parts of Russia. By the end of April, Northern Scandinavia and central-western Russia eastwards still had snow cover. By 29 June, only far Northern parts of Russia still had snow cover left from winter.

=== Sea ice ===
Maximum sea ice extent on 13 March 2019.

The minimum extent of the summer season was reached on 19 September, and again on the 23rd. The sea ice extent dropped to 1.77 million square miles (4.59 million square kilometres), which tied the record for the sixth lowest (with 2008 and 2010). The minimum was reached 5 and 9 days later than the mean date of 14 September. After this, ice began forming much quicker than average. This meant by 30 November, most places had above average ice-cover. Sea ice extent peaked on 13 March, at 5.71 million square miles (14.78 million square kilometres). This was the 7th lowest peak, tying with 2007.

== Overview by country ==
=== United Kingdom ===
In the United Kingdom, winter was much warmer than average, and the warmest since 2015–16. Anomalies of 1.5 °C (2.7 °F) above average were recorded across most of England, Wales and Northern Ireland, with anomalies of 1.0 °C (1.8 °F) above in Scotland. The period of very low rainfall continued into the winter, with most places seeing between 50 and 70% of their average rainfall, with places in South East Scotland seeing less than 30%.
