= Tornado outbreak of May 22–23, 1981 =

Tornado outbreak in Oklahoma between May 22–23, 1981

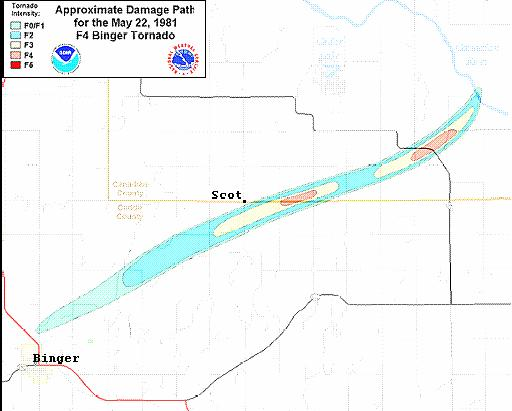
- Path of the Binger, Oklahoma Tornado on May 22, 1981

Meteorological history
- Duration: May 22–23, 1981

Tornado outbreak
- Tornadoes: 43
- Max. rating: F4 tornado

Overall effects
- Casualties: 12 injuries
- Damage: $32.8 million (1981 USD)
- Areas affected: Central United States
- Part of the tornado outbreaks of 1981

An intense tornado outbreak occurred on May 22 in western and Central Oklahoma and on May 23 from eastern and central Oklahoma to central Iowa. A total of 43 tornadoes were confirmed during the two-day outbreak, of which 14 were recorded as strong or violent (F2 or greater on the Fujita Scale). The outbreak resulted in no fatalities and only 12 injuries from a tornado that touched down near Clinton, Oklahoma, which caused significant damage. The tornado outbreak overall left $32.8 million (1981 USD) in damage.

== Storm history ==
On the morning of May 22, 1981, winds moving in from the south brought moist air across Texas and into western Oklahoma, and a dry line formed across the Texas panhandle. In addition, the interaction between a layer of warm air aloft and the return flow of moist air led to widespread low clouds across the state of Oklahoma. Later that day, the low clouds broke as predicted by forecasters as the dry line moved east into western Oklahoma. However, the clearing was limited to a relatively narrow zone ahead of the dry line. Despite this, daytime heating allowed thunderstorms to form by mid-afternoon.

== Confirmed tornadoes ==
Confirmed tornadoes by Fujita rating
FU	F0	F1	F2	F3	F4	F5	Total
0	15	14	11	2	1	0	43

=== May 22 event ===
Tornadoes in Oaklahoma on May 22
F#	Location	County	Time (UTC)	Path length	Damage
F2	N of New Cordell	Washita	2217	6.9 miles (11 km)	See New Cordell tornado of May 22, below
F1	E of Lake Valley	Washita	2325	1 miles (1.6 km)	
F2	E of Cowden	Washita, Caddo	0007	5 miles (8 km)	Tornado damaged a house, outbuildings, trees, power poles, and wheat crop.
F1	SW of Arapaho	Custer	0015	0.1 miles (0.16 km)	Tornado struck several farms, damaging houses, outbuildings, farm equipment, and crops.
F0	W of Albert	Caddo	0029	0.3 miles (0.5 km)	
F2	N of Mountain View to W of Eakla	Kiowa, Washita, Caddo	0030	15.4 miles (24.6 km)	A dozen homes were torn apart. Outbuildings, farm equipment, and crops were damaged as well.
F2	N of Stafford	Washita, Custer	0030	10.4 miles (16.6 km)	Barns were destroyed and two homes were damaged in Arapaho. A gas station was completely destroyed.
F4	NE of Binger to Scott	Caddo, Canadian	0049	16.7 miles (26.7 km)	See Binger-Scott tornado of May 22, below
F1	NW of Clinton	Custer	0100	0.1 miles (0.16 km)	
F1	NW of Union City	Canadian	0132	2 miles (3.2 km)	
F3	N of Clinton	Custer	0155	10.3 miles (16.5 km)	A few homes were badly damaged in Clinton. A convenience store was destroyed near Arapaho. There were 12 injuries.
F2	E of Greenfield	Blaine	0340	unknown	Several farms were damaged. A barn on one farm was destroyed, with five-foot-deep concrete moorings ripped out.
F1	NE of Cleveland	Osage	0700	0.1 miles (0.16 km)	

Tornado in Kansas on May 22
F#	Location	County	Time (UTC)	Path length	Damage
F0	N of Beverly	Lincoln	2315	0.5 miles (0.8 km)	

Tornado in Minnesota on May 22
F#	Location	County	Time (UTC)	Path length	Damage
F0	Moorhead	Clay	2317	0.1 miles (0.16 km)	

Source: Grazulis (1981)

=== May 23 event ===
Tornadoes in Iowa on May 23
F#	Location	County	Time (UTC)	Path length	Damage
F0	S of Clarinda	Page	2032	0.1 miles (0.16 km)	
F0	SW of Grant	Montgomery	2032	0.1 miles (0.16 km)	
F0	W of Canby	Adair	2115	0.1 miles (0.16 km)	
F0	NE of Anita	Cass	2130	0.1 miles (0.16 km)	
F0	E of Canby	Adair	2202	0.1 miles (0.16 km)	
F0	N of Arbor Hill	Adair	2215	0.1 miles (0.16 km)	
F0	S of Dexter	Madison	2236	0.1 miles (0.16 km)	
F2	W of Benton to Ellston	Ringgold	2300	16 miles (25.4 km)	The tornado touched down around 1 mile west of Benton or 2 miles NE of Maloy just west of the Barker Family Farm. It destroyed several farm buildings there and through its 16-mile track. From the Barker Family Farm, it travelled east to Benton. Several homes near and around Benton were damaged. The tornado continued northeast to northwest of Mount Ayr. Loch Ayr Lake was hit and several cabins were damaged. The tornado continued northeast to near Ellston. Near Ellston, at the end of its track, a combine was thrown across a road and wrapped around a tree. The tornado was 130 yards wide at its peak. Ringgold County would not be hit by another Tornado until June 1984 during the Upper Midwest Tornado Outbreak.
F1	SE of Earlham	Madison	2328	0.1 miles (0.16 km)	
F2	W of Osage	Mitchell	2355	3.8 miles (6.1 km)	Five farms sustained damage. Three barns, three machine sheds, a trailer, and a garage were destroyed.

Tornadoes in Oklahoma on May 23
F#	Location	County	Time (UTC)	Path length	Damage
F1	E of Bristow	Creek	2100	0.1 miles (0.16 km)	
F1	NW of Hoover	Garvin	2200	2 miles (3.2 km)	
F0	NW of Lenapah	Noata	2230	0.1 miles (0.16 km)	
F1	Sulphur area	Murray	2305	0.1 miles (0.16 km)	
F1	SW of McLoud	Pottawatomie	2325	0.1 miles (0.16 km)	
F1	SE of Aydelotte	Pottawatomie	2330	0.1 miles (0.16 km)	
F2	NE of Copan	Washington, Nowata, Montgomery (KS)	2330	15.2 miles (24.3 km)	Two frame homes and three trailers were destroyed along the track.
F2	NW of Elliot	Nowata	2335	4.5 miles (7.2 km)	
F3	Durant area	Bryan	0058	9.7 miles (15.5 km)	Moved along the west edge of Durant. Significant damage to resort property at Lake Texoma. Caused $5,000,00 in damage.
F1	SW of Sasakwa	Bryan	0100	0.1 miles (0.16 km)	
F2	E of Colcord	Delaware	0118	unknown	

Tornadoes in Kansas on May 23
F#	Location	County	Time (UTC)	Path length	Damage
F0	NW of Wallula	Leavenworth	2115	2 miles (3.2 km)	
F2	W of Scipio	Anderson	2115	1.5 miles (2.4 km)	A trailer was completely destroyed. A farm struck by the tornado sustained heavy damage to the house, outbuildings, and farm equipment.
F1	S of Centerville	Linn	2215	2 miles (3.2 km)	
F0	E of Coffeyville	Montgomery	2325	0.5 miles (0.8 km)	
F1	SW of Valeda	Montgomery	2340	0.5 miles (0.8 km)	

Tornadoes in Missouri on May 23
F#	Location	County	Time (UTC)	Path length	Damage
F0	W of Ferrelview	Platte	2153	3.8 miles (6.1 km)	
F0	N of Nevada	Vernon	2355	0.5 miles (0.8 km)	

Source: Grazulis (1981)

=== New Cordell, Oklahoma ===
New Cordell, Oklahoma
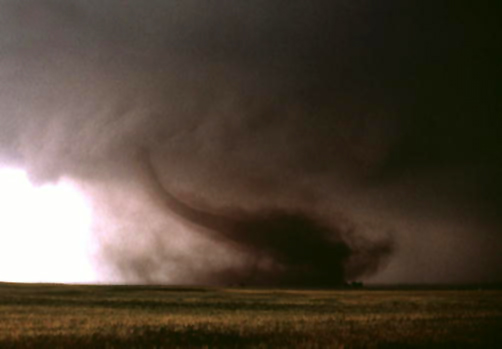
- Photograph of the New Cordell Tornado

Meteorological history
- Formed: May 22, 1981 , 4:17 p.m. CDT (UTC−05:00)
- Dissipated: May 22, 1981 , 4:37 p.m. CDT (UTC−05:00)
- Duration: 20 minutes

F2 tornado
- on the Fujita scale
- Highest winds: 135 mph (217 km/h)

Overall effects
- Casualties: None

The first tornado formed northwest of New Cordell, Oklahoma at 4:17 pm (CDT). The tornado damaged a mobile home and several barns as it moved northeast over a six-mile path. The tornado was photographed 5 times by a storm chaser team during a project conducted by the National Severe Storms Laboratory and Mississippi State University. The tornado turned out to be a significant F2. No deaths or injuries were recorded. Storm chasers would go on to nickname the tornado the "Wizard of Oz" tornado because of its unusual ropey shape, which had a very close resemblance to the tornado in the aforementioned movie. In fact, the tornado had no prominent curve at the top as its funnel – much like the Wizard of Oz tornado – as it neared its decaying stage.

=== Binger–Scott, Oklahoma ===
Binger–Scott, Oklahoma
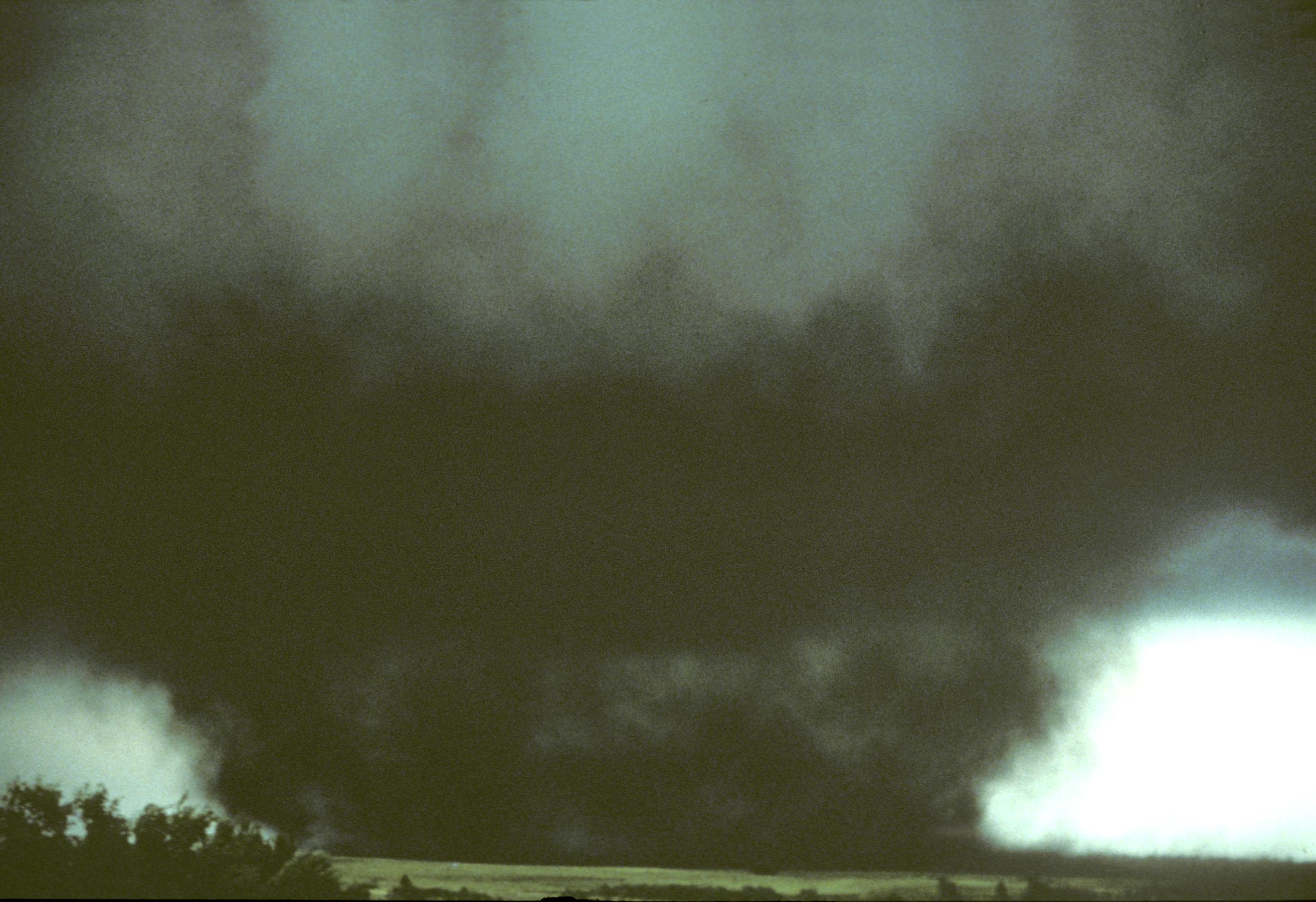
- Photograph of the Binger Tornado

Meteorological history
- Formed: May 22, 1981 , 6:45 p.m. CDT (UTC−05:00)
- Dissipated: May 22, 1981 , 7:10 p.m. CDT (UTC−05:00)
- Duration: 25 minutes

F4 tornado
- on the Fujita scale
- Highest winds: 230 mph (370 km/h)

Overall effects
- Casualties: None

A second thunderstorm formed south of the thunderstorm that produced the New Cordell tornado. The second thunderstorm moved northeast, causing some concern among officials and forecasters as the storm was heading directly towards Oklahoma City. The second thunderstorm produced 6–12 tornadoes across a wide area stretching from Fort Cobb Reservoir to Union City. The thunderstorm later encountered cooler, less unstable air and dissipated near Oklahoma City.

One of the group of the tornadoes, this violent tornado touched down north of Binger at 6:45 pm CDT. The tornado lifted west of Union City, Oklahoma. At the time of formation, it was weak; only causing F1 damage before rapidly intensifying as it approached Scott. A home 4 miles southwest of Scott had all of its walls collapsed, but supporting wood beams were rotten. East of this home, a different home had sustained F3 damage, only an interior room remained. A mile east, one home had some exterior walls destroyed. Nearby some hardwood trees were severely damaged. When the tornado was 4.5 miles west of Scott, multiple oil tanks were blown away at the Amoco Petroleum Corporation Lease. One oil tank was found 1,500 feet south of its original resting place. It reached F4 status as it passed east of town, one farm was hit at F4 intensity. A truck nearby was rolled 500 yards. The tornado weakened to F2 intensity, before intensifying back to F4 intensity SH 37 until it dissipated at the Canadian River. Damage from the tornado was severe as it destroyed an old uninhabited house outside of Scott. addition, the tornado uprooted or damaged several trees and flipped over automobiles and farm equipment during its 16-mile duration. Damage losses were relatively low, since the tornado remained mostly rural. People impacted by the storm had ample warning time of the tornado also.

=== Other tornadoes ===
After the Binger tornado dissipated, a complex of severe thunderstorms regenerated further west across west-central Oklahoma near Foss Reservoir. The thunderstorms produced at least five tornadoes, including an F3 tornado that affected the area around Clinton, Oklahoma, injuring 12 people. In Alfalfa, Oklahoma, two tornadoes were reported, one which did F2 damage. Thunderstorms along and east of a line from Oklahoma City, Kansas City and Omaha, Nebraska produced 29 tornadoes on May 23 across Oklahoma, Missouri, Kansas and Iowa. The same system travelled northwest and produced an F3 tornado that struck Bowl Bay, McCurdy Island on May 25.

== See also ==
- List of North American tornadoes and tornado outbreaks
