= 2018 British Isles cold wave =

Cold wave in Europe in February–March 2018

Anticyclone Hartmut Beast from the East
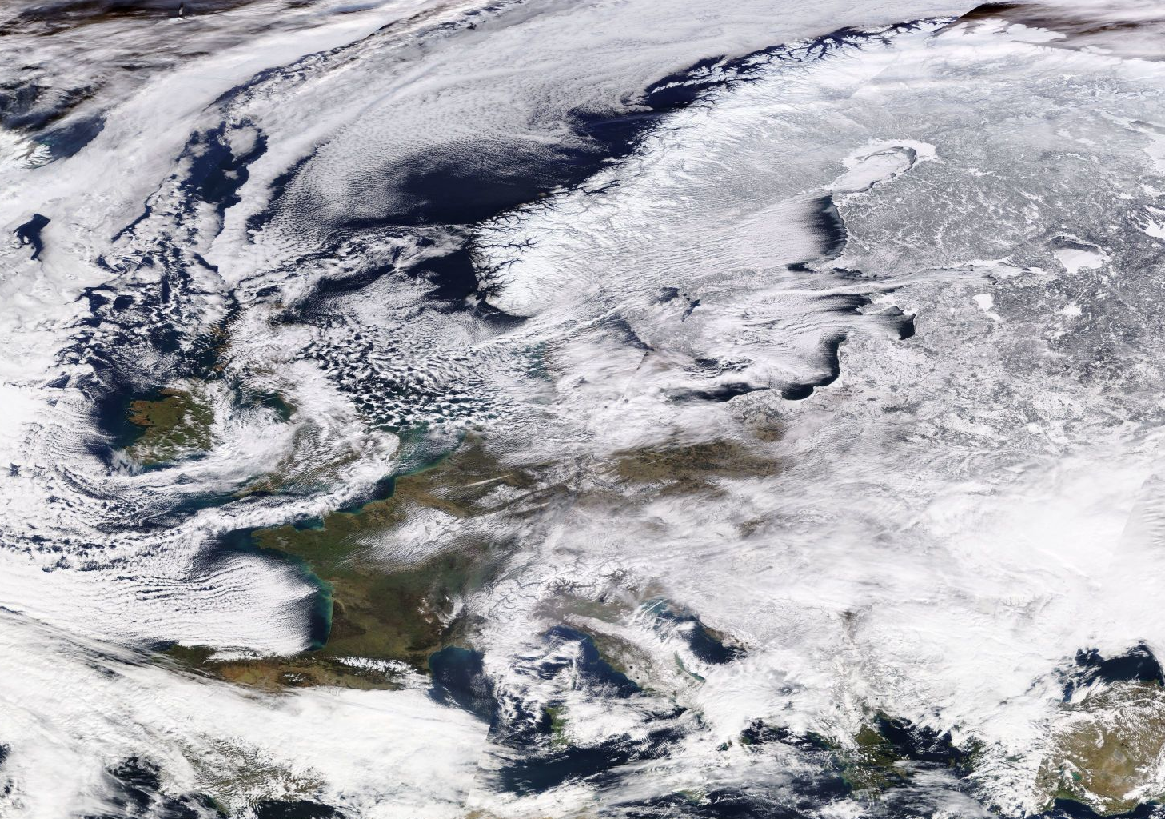
- Satellite view showing Europe, including Great Britain and Ireland partially covered in snow under the lines of the strong cold wave on 27 February 2018

Meteorological history
- Formed: 22 February 2018
- Dissipated: 5 March 2018

Winter storm, anticyclonic storm, polar vortex
- Highest winds: 187 km/h (116 mph)
- Lowest temp: −14.2 °C (6.4 °F); Faversham, Kent
- Max. snowfall: 57 cm (22 in); Gloucestershire, England

Overall effects
- Fatalities: 95 total; 17 in UK
- Damage: £1.2 billion (2018)
- Areas affected: Great Britain and Ireland; much of continental Europe

Anticyclone Hartmut (dubbed the "Beast from the East"; Irish: An Torathar ón Oirthear) was a storm that began on 22 February 2018, and brought a cold wave to Great Britain and Ireland. Anticyclone Hartmut also brought widespread unusually low temperatures and heavy snowfall to large areas. The cold wave combined with Storm Emma, part of the 2017–18 European windstorm season, which made landfall in southwest England and the south of Ireland on 2 March.

In contrast to usual winter storms, Hartmut was not formed as a normal low pressure area along the jetstream. The initial event was an Arctic outbreak (caused by a disordered polar vortex) into Central Europe, transporting not only cold air from Siberia to Europe but also – due to the lake effect – sending heavy snowfall into Great Britain and Ireland.

This weather situation repeated itself on the weekend of 17 and 18 March, but was less severe than on the previous occasion, due to the onset of spring. This briefer cold snap was given the name "Mini Beast from the East".

== Causes and effects ==
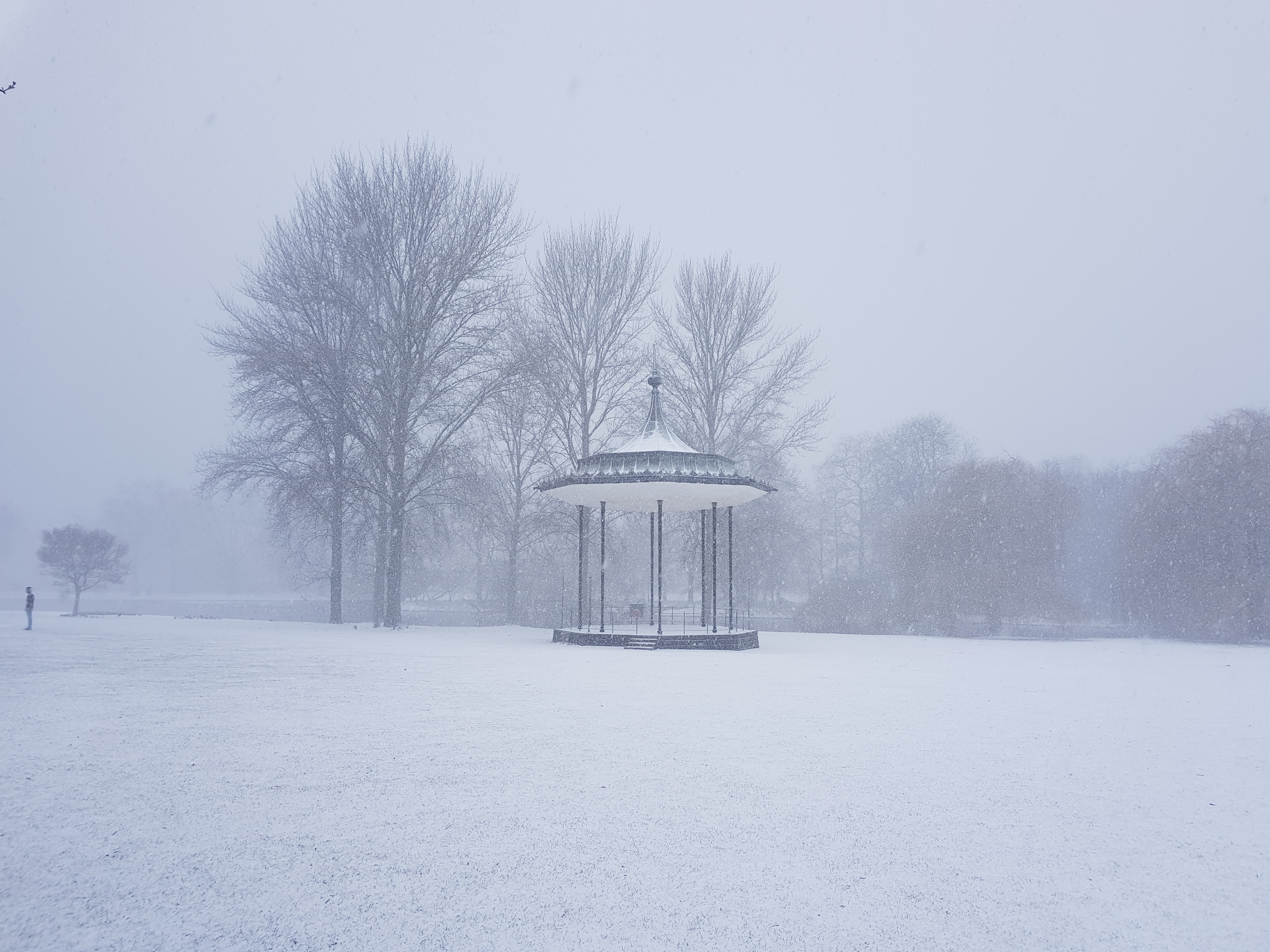
Snowfall during the cold wave in Regent's Park, London

The Hartmut cold spell was caused by a large arctic airmass with anticyclonic structure, stretching from the Russian Far East to the British Isles and covering large parts of Asia and almost all of Europe. The anticyclone, centred on Scandinavia, was the dominant high pressure area in the weather system and represented its European part. North Asia was covered by other anticyclones that belonged to that giant arctic airmass. The anticyclone brought cold easterly winds into Europe and the British Isles, leading to snowfall and sub-zero temperatures, as a result of freezing air from Siberia. Ireland was predicted to experience its worst winter for at least 30 years. In the United Kingdom the Met Office issued a red snow warning, meaning a potential risk to life.

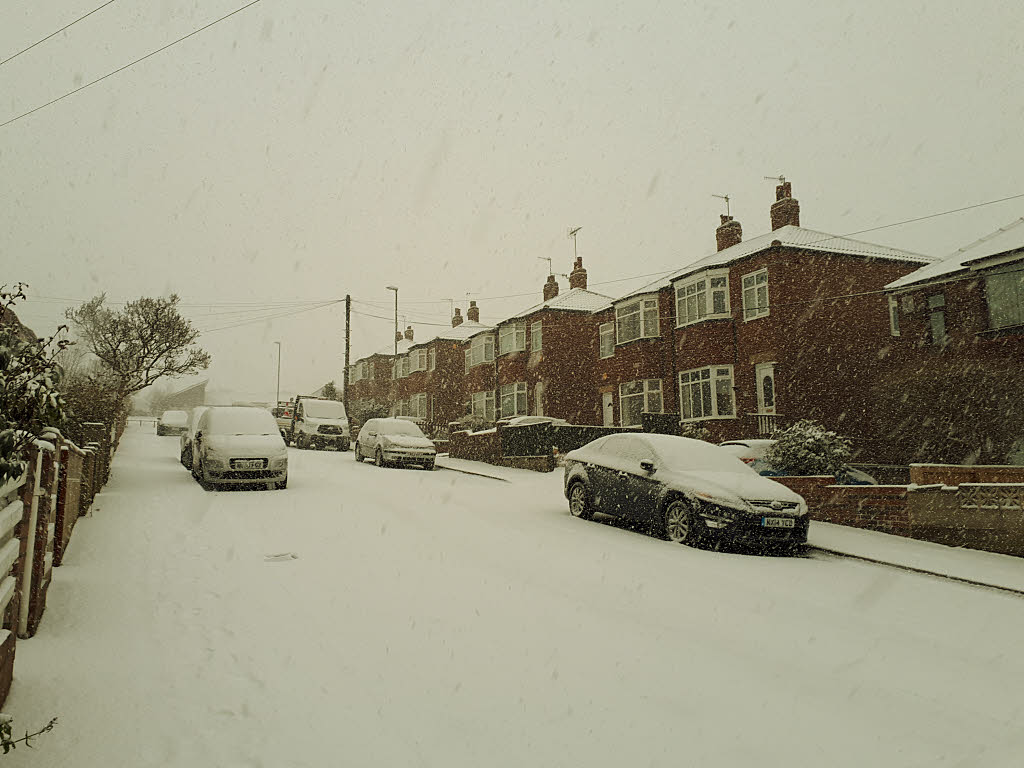
Snow-covered street in Bramley, West Yorkshire

The anticyclone was such an intense high pressure system that it evolved into an anticyclonic storm, and was named Hartmut. A gust of 187 km/h (116 mph) was registered in the Øvre Dividal National Park in Norway, relatively near to the anticyclonic centre. Other hurricane-force gusts delivered by Hartmut were registered across Europe, particularly over Scandinavia and the British Isles. Such hurricane-force anticyclonic storms are not extremely rare, but occur less often than cyclonic storms of similar intensity.

Sixteen weather-related deaths included that of a seven-year-old girl on Thursday 1 March in Looe, Cornwall, when she was hit by a car that slid on ice into a bungalow. On Wednesday 28 February, Stephen Cavanagh, 60, died after trying to save his dog from a lake in Welling, South East London. Also on Wednesday, a 46-year-old man died in a crash and a 75-year-old woman was found dead underneath her car in Farsley. A carer from Glasgow died on her way to work and a 52-year-old homeless man was found dead freezing inside his tent. On Tuesday 27 February, four people died in two separate weather-related crashes. A 20-year-old also died after slipping and falling whilst crossing a bridge in Haddington, East Lothian. This followed the death of a man trying to help another driver in the snowy conditions in Bergh Apton, Norfolk, who suffered a heart attack. A 70-year-old also died after being rescued from icy cliffs in Torquay.

== Storm Emma ==
Storm Emma brought chaos with heavy snow and strong winds to the South of Ireland, South West England and Southern Wales on 2–3 March 2018 with up to 50 cm (20 in) of snow in some elevated areas. High winds brought disruption to other parts of Great Britain and Ireland. It also brought rail disruption as several trains became stranded, full of passengers, for up to 14 hours. Daytime temperatures were also very suppressed, some places not rising above −12 °C (10 °F).

== Mini Beast from the East ==
Following a brief spell of warmer weather, a fresh cold snap nicknamed the "Mini Beast from the East" was forecast to bring another covering of snow on the weekend of 17 and 18 March. However, due to the onset of spring, and a higher sun position, it was forecast that the effect would be less severe than on the previous occasion, for the ground was warmer than before, and thus the snow would melt more quickly.

Snow showers began to affect parts of Britain and Ireland on 17 March, with north-east England, the North Midlands, and parts of southern England experiencing the heaviest snowfall. The snow was accompanied by strong winds, forecast to be as high as 110 km/h (70 mph), and the Met Office issued an amber weather warning effective from the afternoon of 17 March. Snow showers continued to affect parts of the UK and Ireland on 18 March, with south-west England the most severely affected. The adverse weather conditions forced the cancellation of some sporting events, including the Reading Half Marathon, while Ireland's rugby union team, who had won the 2018 Six Nations Championship, cancelled their homecoming "due to heavy snowfall" with no new date confirmed.

== See also ==
- 2018–19 European winter
- 2013–14 United Kingdom winter floods
