= Anticyclonic storm =

Type of storm

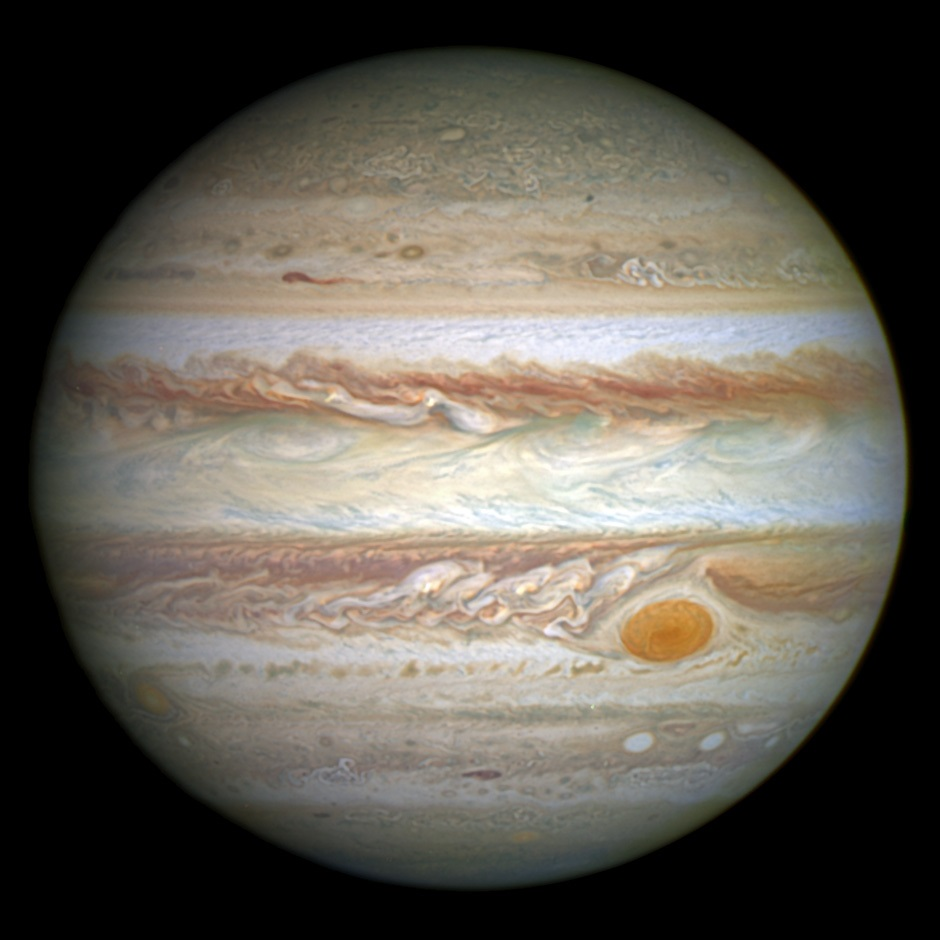
The Great Red Spot on Jupiter is considered as an anticyclonic storm system.

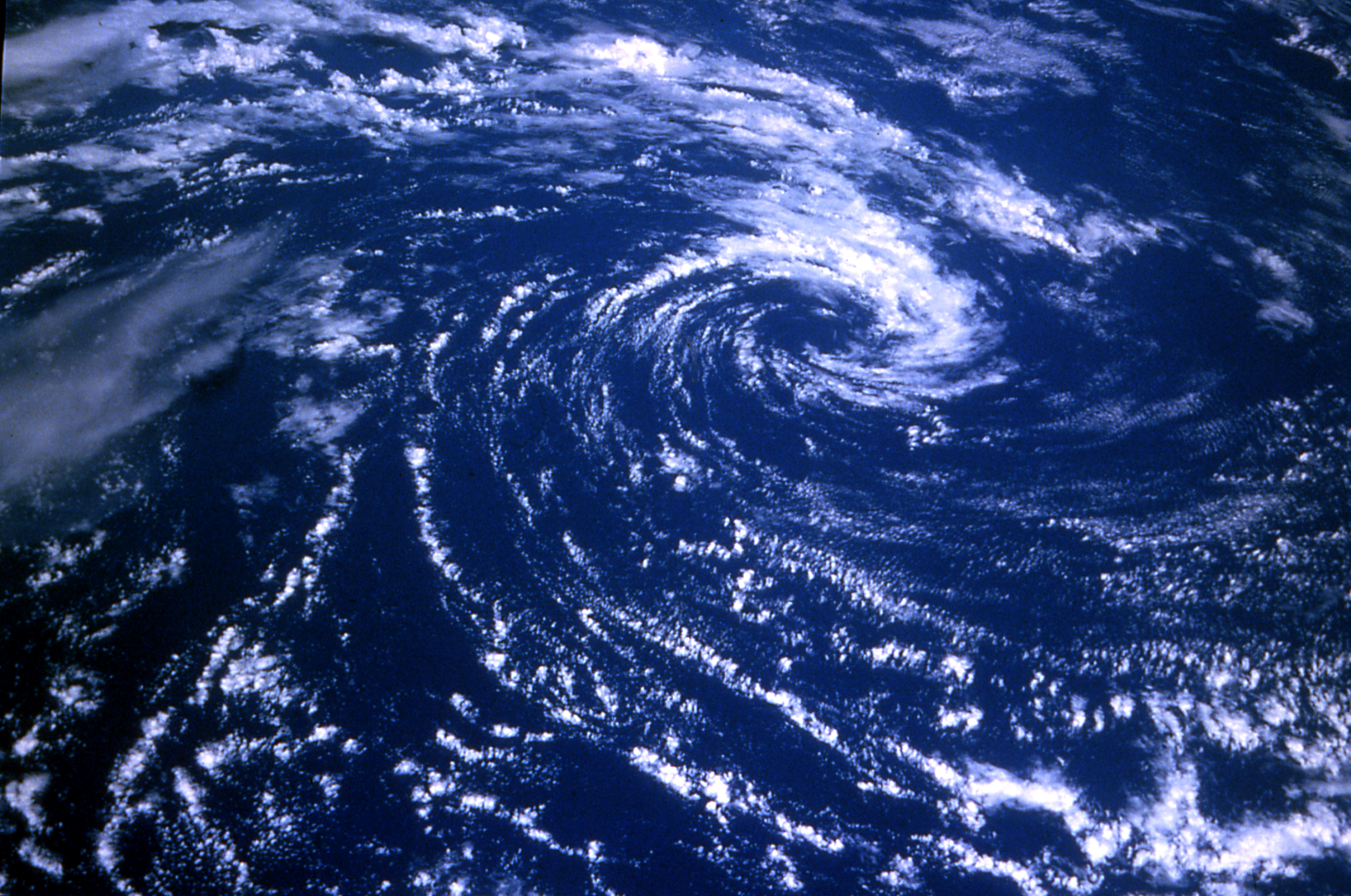
Anticyclonic cloud system taken above the Pacific Ocean by the STS-41-B crew

An anticyclonic storm is a storm with a high-pressure center, in which winds flow in the direction opposite to that of the flow above a region of low pressure. Unlike a cyclonic storm, anticyclonic storms are typically associated with fair weather and stable atmospheric conditions. On other planets or in rare cases on Earth, anticyclones can contribute to inclement weather. Examples include Hartmut, which brought a blizzard to the British Isles in 2018, as well as persistent anticyclonic storms on Jupiter and Neptune.

== Description ==
=== Synoptic-scale anticyclones ===
Anticyclonic storms at the synoptic scale usually form around high-pressure systems where air moves apart and sinks. Air at the center of these storms is forced away from the high pressure zones and replaced by a downdraft of air from higher altitudes. Anticyclonic storms have fewer clouds than cyclonic storms, due to a lower humidity. This lower humidity is caused by the air compressing and heating up as it moves downward.

Anticyclonic storms, as high-pressure systems, usually bring warm, clear conditions in the summer. Occasionally, this can result in heat wave conditions and droughts if the anticyclone remains stationary over a certain region of land. During the winter time, the clear, settled conditions of the anticyclone can lead to frost and fog. This is because the clear skies created by the sinking air of the high-pressure system allow heat to be lost from Earth's surface overnight, leading to rapid air temperature drops that condense into frost or fog.

Due to the Coriolis effect, anticyclonic storms involve clockwise flow in the Northern Hemisphere and counterclockwise flow in the Southern Hemisphere.

=== Mesoanticyclonic supercells ===
Supercells are long-lasting and rotating convective storms that are formed when thunderstorms are accompanied by strong vertical wind shear. A supercell has a rotating updraft (mesocyclone) and a downdraft. The mesocyclone is created when horizontal vortices created by the wind shear (varying wind speed and direction with height) are tilted into the vertical by the storm's updraft. Typically, the mesocyclone rotates cyclonically (counter-clockwise in the northern hemisphere), but on occasion it can rotate anticyclonically, thus yielding a Mesoanticyclone. Mesoanticyclones in the northern hemisphere are more likely to form in an environment where the vertical wind shear vector turns in a counterclockwise manner with height (wind backing). As such, anticyclonic supercells typically move left of the mean tropospheric wind unlike most supercells and are short-lived, so they rarely produce tornadoes.

=== Anticyclonic tornadoes ===
Tornado vortices rotate cyclonically in about 99% of cases, but some tornadoes rotate anticyclonically under favorable conditions and occur on a small enough scale that the Coriolis effect is negligible. Anticyclonic tornadoes typically appear as accessories to regular cyclonic tornadoes in cyclonically rotating, right-moving supercells, but are weaker and short-lived. Rarely, anticyclonic supercells can also spawn anticyclonic tornadoes.

=== Examples ===
- Anticyclone Hartmut, Scandinavia: From 25 February – 4 March 2018, a Siberian airmass triggered a rare instance of an "anticyclonic blizzard" during an exceptionally strong anticyclone with hurricane-force maximum gusts of 187 km/h (116 mph) and peak central pressure of 1056 hPa. It caused the Beast from the East, a deadly cold wave that channeled freezing air and large amounts of snow over Europe. The interaction of Anticyclone Hartmut and Cyclone Emma intensified the wind and snowfall threat in Western Europe, particularly the British Isles.
- Neptune: In 1989, Voyager 2 discovered an anticyclonic cloud system (DS2) in convective storms at 55°S on Neptune. There were bright and high clouds associated with this system with an anticyclonic vortex. These cloud systems on Neptune are known as 'companion clouds' because they are formed similarly to the cloud structures on Earth that can lead to anticyclonic storms. Voyager 2 discovered convective storms where one of which resembled anticyclonic behavior. This convective storm was located in the DS2 anticyclone located at 55°S. There were bright and high clouds associated with this system with an anticyclonic vortex.

== See also ==
- Anticyclone
- Anticyclonic tornado
- Great Red Spot
