= 1981 West Bend tornado =

1981 deadly weather event in Wisconsin, US

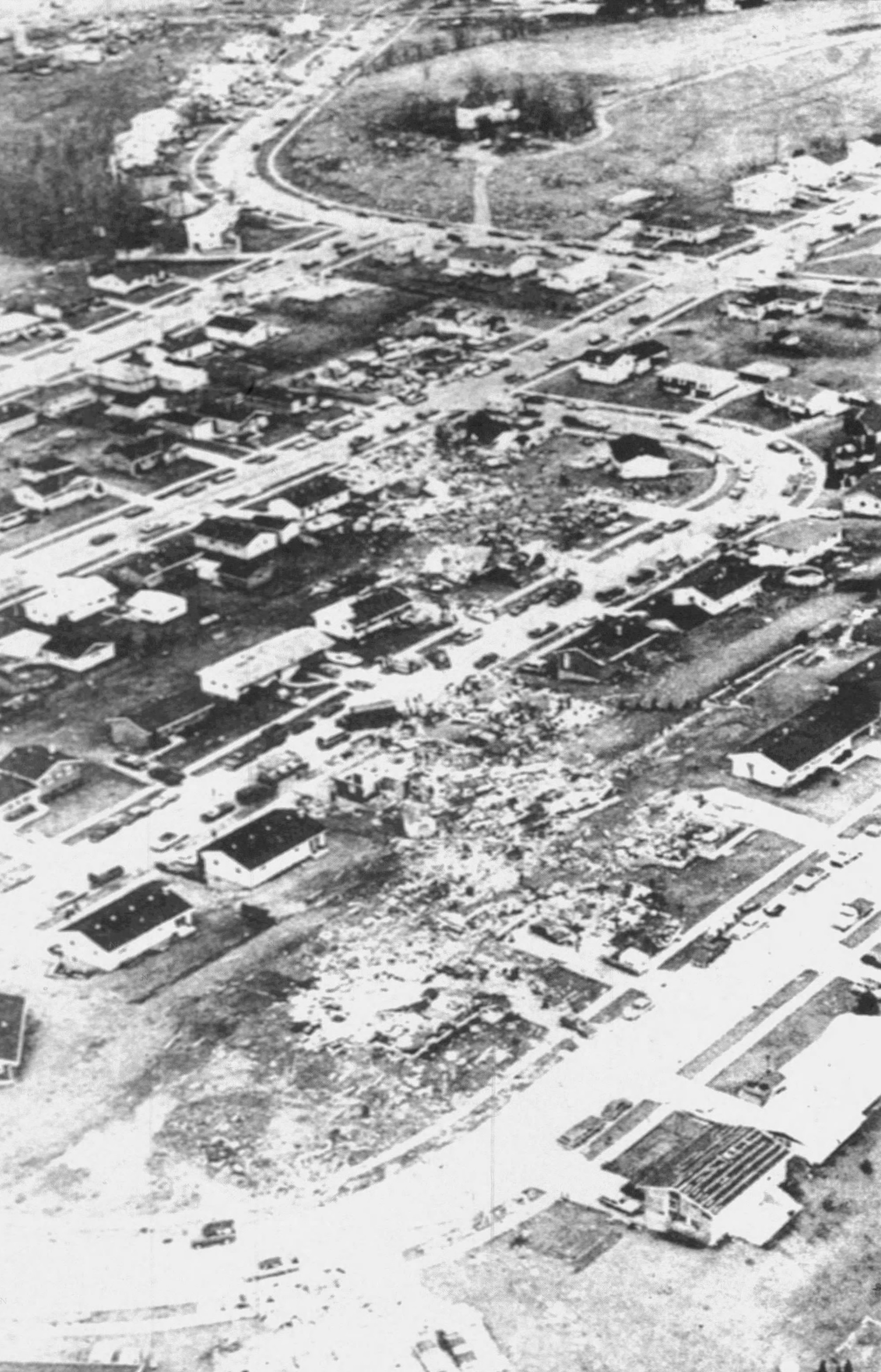
- An aerial view of the beginning of the tornado's path, where it produced F4 level damage

Meteorological history
- Date: April 4, 1981
- Duration: 5 minutes

F4 tornado
- on the Fujita scale
- Highest winds: 207 - 260 miles per hour

Overall effects
- Fatalities: 3
- Injuries: 53
- Damage: $25.0 million (1981 USD)
- Areas affected: West Bend, Wisconsin
- Part of the Tornadoes of 1981

In the early morning hours of April 4, 1981, an unusual and deadly anticyclonic F4 tornado struck West Bend, Wisconsin. It killed three people, and injured another 53. The tornado was largely unexpected and the storm that produced it did not display features of a typical severe storm. Because of this, the National Weather Service issued only a Severe Thunderstorm Warning prior to the tornado which caused local law enforcement to not sound the tornado sirens in time for residents to take shelter.

== Meteorological synopsis ==
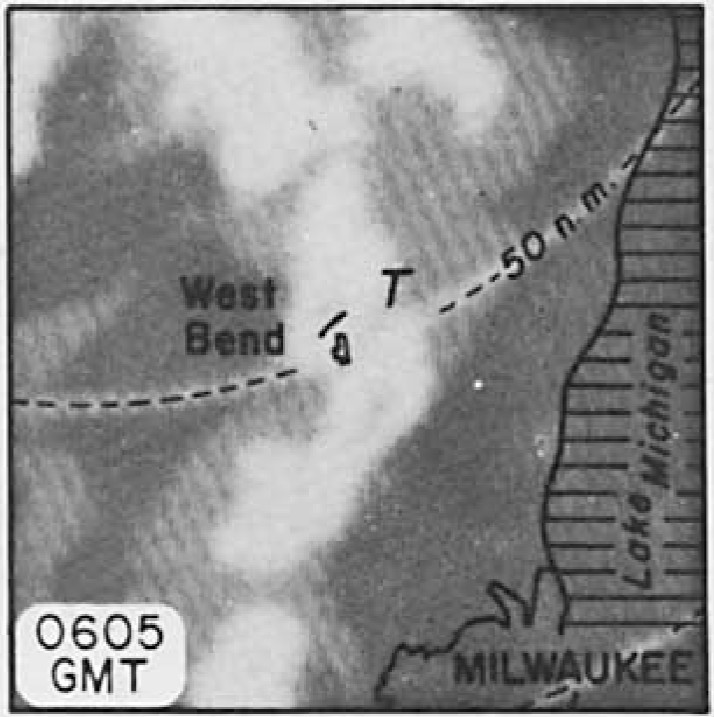
A radar image of the parent storm while producing the tornado.

During the early morning on April 4, 1981, meteorological conditions in Wisconsin were conducive for severe weather. At around 12:00am CST (0600 UTC) a thunderstorm developed and rapidly began to grow over south central Wisconsin. The growing storm caused a downburst near the village of Clyman and then continued towards West Bend. The storm did not appear to be severe and thunderstorm tops were measured to only be 26,000 feet (7,900 m), and a weak bow echo was observed by a radar in Neenah.

== Tornado Summary ==
Only a few minutes after midnight CDT while the parent storm was weakening, the tornado touched down on the north side of West Bend around the intersection of Jefferson Street and North 18th Avenue. Within seconds of touching down, the tornado produced F3 to F4 level damage to multiple homes. The tornado moved along and north of Green Tree Road before hitting the Moraine Park Technical College campus, destroying the main building at F2-F3 intensity before moving off to the northeast across the Milwaukee River. The tornado produced F4 damage to one home along Newark Road, before lifting shortly afterwards.

All three fatalities from the tornado occurred within a few blocks of touchdown. Post storm analysis determined that not only was the tornado an extremely rare occurrence given the storm's strength, but also that it was an anticyclonic tornado. The F4 tornado remains the strongest anticyclonic tornado ever recorded.

== Aftermath ==
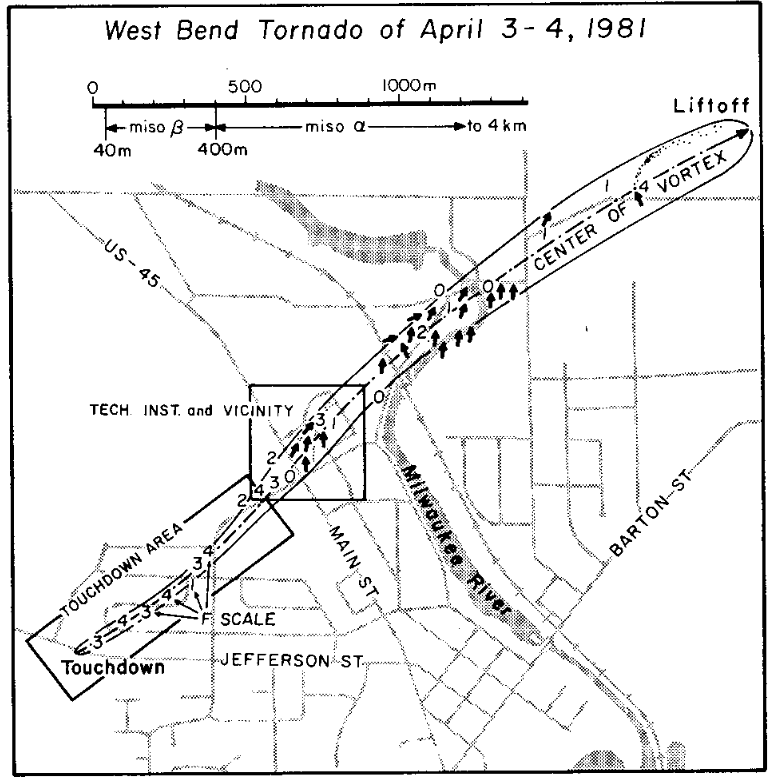
The path of the West Bend tornado as mapped out by Ted Fujita.

The West Bend tornado killed three people and injured another 53. It was the most intense tornado to strike Wisconsin in 1981, and caused $25.0 million in damages. Following the tornado the American Red Cross determined that around 139 structures were damaged or destroyed by the storm. With many residents left homeless and the threat of more storms looming, Governor Lee S. Dreyfus declared a state of emergency freeing up the area for aid. The campus of the Moraine Park Technical Institute was severely damaged by the tornado and classes were disrupted.

It was determined that the West Bend police did not activate the city's siren system before or during the tornado. The National Weather Service in Milwaukee issued a Severe Thunderstorm Warning for the area that only mentioned a confirmed tornado touchdown. However, because no Tornado Warning was issued for the storm, local police failed to activate the siren. Nearby Dodge County did activate their siren system after damage reports. The tornado showed the problems with operational meteorology or "nowcasting". The storm did not display the typical features of a severe storm and the tornado that was produced formed while the storm was weakening, an almost unheard of event.

== See also ==
- List of North American tornadoes and tornado outbreaks
- Anticyclonic tornado
- 1996 Oakfield tornado outbreak
