= October 2008 United Kingdom cold wave =

Weather event in the UK

The October 2008 United Kingdom cold wave was a spell of unseasonable weather that affected the United Kingdom during the final week of October 2008. The event set new low October temperature records across areas in England, Scotland, and Wales and brought the first recorded October snowfall to some areas of the country in more than 70 years. The cold wave caused disruptions to power supplies and transport in southern England, and led to the postponement of several sporting fixtures.

== Report ==
=== Snowfall ===
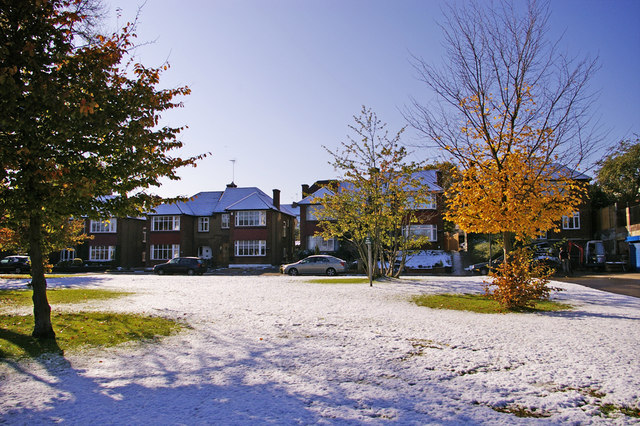
Snow in north London on 29 October 2008

Snowfall was widespread on 28 October, with lying snow also widespread. For parts of south-eastern England it was the first October snowfall for decades, with London having last experienced such early snow in 1934. There was more snow on the 29th. The conditions marked the first time since 1887 that snow had settled on the ground prior to November in Surrey.

=== Temperatures ===
The cold front brought lower than average temperatures to many parts of the United Kingdom, with several areas setting new records for October. The United Kingdom as a whole saw its lowest October maximum temperature over 28-29 October with 5.6 °C (42.1 °F), breaking the previous record set in 1974. On 28 October Scotland observed its lowest ever October maximum temperature with 3.3 °C (37.9 °F), with Wales and Northern Ireland following suit on 29 October with identical records of 4.7 °C (40.5 °F). England's maximum temperature of 6.4 °C (43.5 °F) on the same day was the second-lowest recorded in the country in October since 1960.

A number of Met Office stations across the United Kingdom additionally set new local temperature records for the month over 28-29 October. Leuchers, Aberporth, Watnall, and Shawbury, as well as Ronaldsway on the Isle of Man, all observed their lowest maximum October temperatures on record, while stations in Coningsby, Lyneham, and Tiree registered their lowest minimum temperatures for October.

Overnight on the 28-29 October temperatures dropped to −4 °C (25 °F) in eastern England, while Manchester registered a daily high of just 5 °C (41 °F) on 28 October, 5°C lower than normal.

== Impact ==
Cables damaged by the cold conditions left thousands of households across Bedfordshire, Hertfordshire and Buckinghamshire without power, with engineers unable to undertake repairs due to the inclement weather. There were disruptions at Luton Airport with twelve departing flights cancelled and seven incoming flights diverted to Birmingham and Stansted in order for the runways to be cleared of snow. Several football matches set to be played on the evening of 28 October in England and Wales were also abandoned or postponed due to the weather.
