= Canby, Iowa =

- Unincorporated community
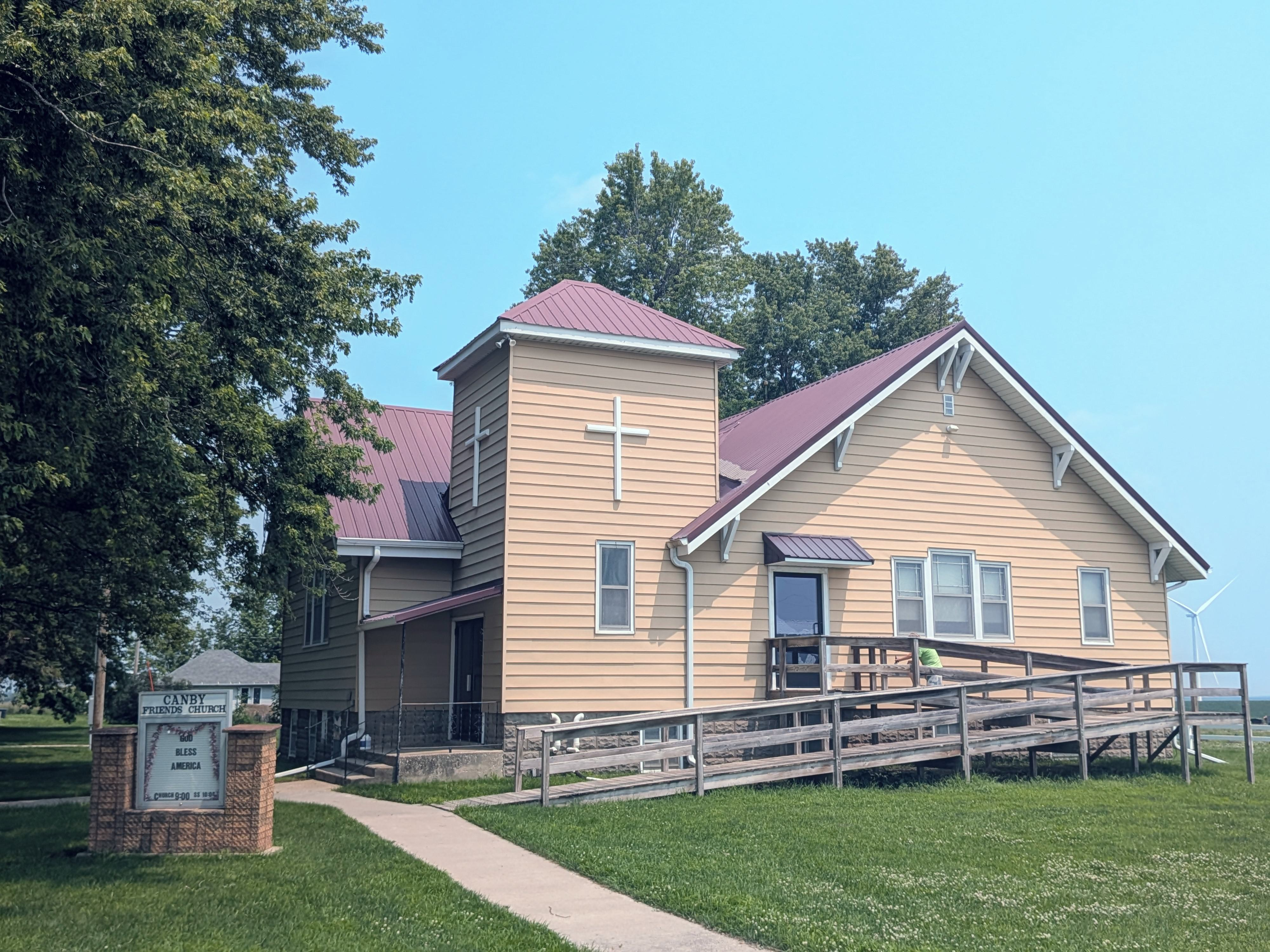
- Canby Friends Church

- Location within Iowa
- Coordinates: 41°25′02″N 94°34′00″W
- Country: United States
- State: Iowa
- County: Adair
- Elevation: 1,440 ft (440 m)
- Time zone: UTC-6 (Central (CST))
  - Summer (DST): UTC-5 (CDT)
- Area code: 641
- GNIS feature ID: 465950

Canby is an unincorporated community in Adair County, in the U.S. state of Iowa.

== History ==
A post office called Canby was established in 1873, and remained in operation until 1908. A Quaker church of friends still stands near the town site. Canby's population was 13 in 1902, and 25 in 1925.

Little remains of the original community.
