= Anticyclonic tornado =

Tornadoes that spin in the opposite direction of normal tornadoes

An anticyclonic tornado is a tornado which rotates in a clockwise direction in the Northern Hemisphere and a counterclockwise direction in the Southern Hemisphere. The term is a naming convention denoting the anomaly from normal rotation which is cyclonic in upwards of 98 percent of tornadoes. Many anticyclonic tornadoes are smaller and weaker than cyclonic tornadoes, forming from a different process, as either companion/satellite tornadoes or nonmesocyclonic tornadoes.

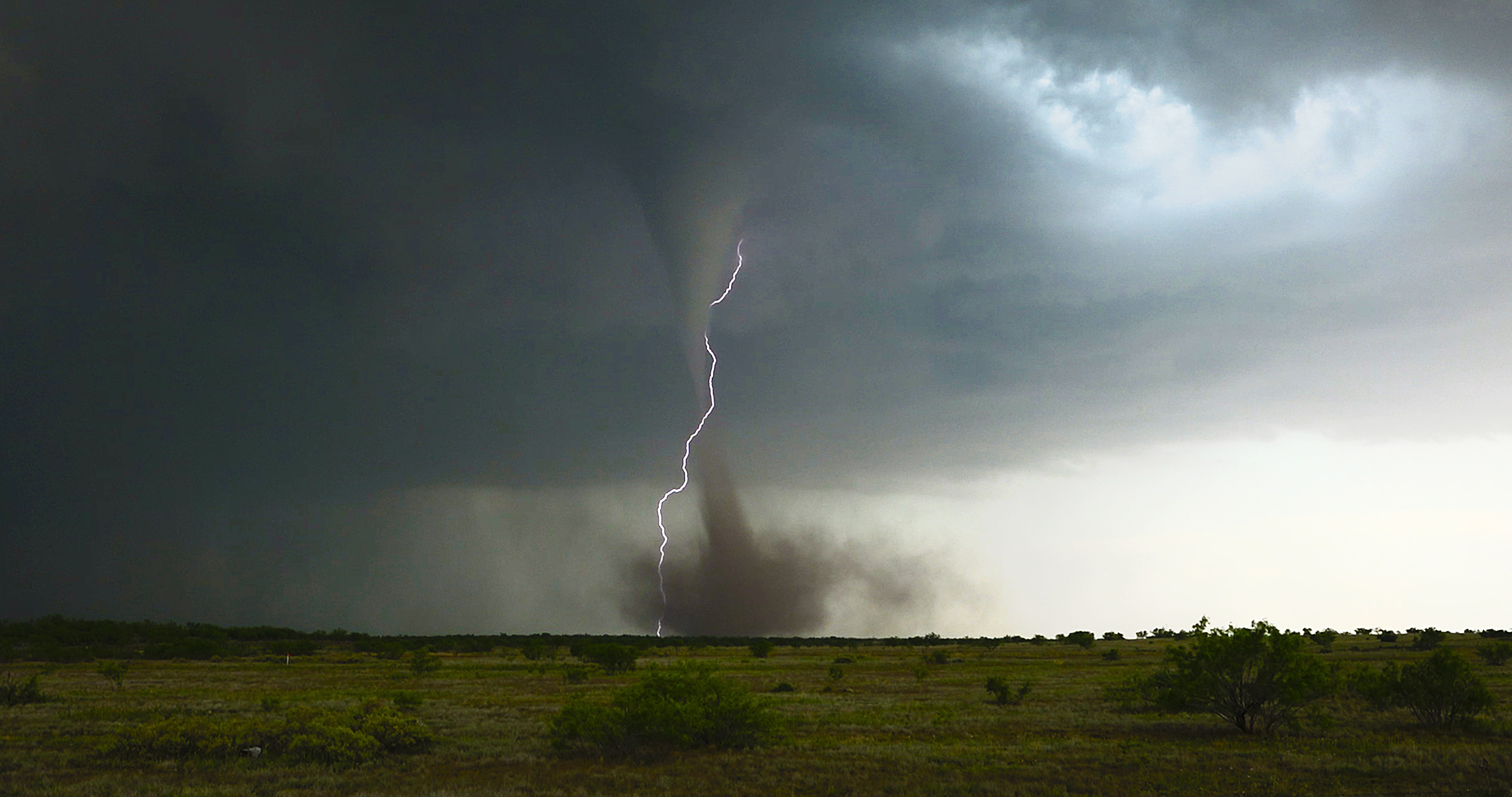
An anticyclonic tornado near Big Spring, Texas on May 22, 2016 captured by storm chaser Aaron Jayjack.

== Formation ==
Most strong tornadoes form in the inflow and updraft area bordering the updraft-downdraft interface (which is also near the mesoscale "triple point") zone of supercell thunderstorms. The thunderstorm itself is rotating, with a rotating updraft known as a mesocyclone, and then a smaller area of rotation at lower altitude the tornadocyclone (or low-level mesocyclone) which produces or enables the smaller rotation that is a tornado. All of these may be quasi-vertically aligned continuing from the ground to the mid-upper levels of the storm. All of these cyclones and scaling all the way up to large extratropical (low-pressure systems) and tropical cyclones rotate cyclonically. Rotation in these synoptic scale systems stems partly from the Coriolis effect, but thunderstorms and tornadoes are too small to be significantly affected. The common property here is an area of lower pressure, thus surrounding air flows into the area of less dense air forming cyclonic rotation. The rotation of the thunderstorm itself is induced mostly by vertical wind shear, specifically clockwise turning as altitude increases (called a veered vertical profile, although backed profiles can occur with anticyclonic supercells).

Various processes can produce an anticyclonic tornado. Most often they are satellite tornadoes of larger tornadoes which are directly associated with the tornadocyclone and mesocyclone. Occasionally anticyclonic tornadoes occur as an anticyclonic companion (mesoanticyclone) to a mesocyclone within a single storm. This is extremely rare and has only been documented 5 total times. Anticyclonic tornadoes can occur as the primary tornado with a mesocyclone and under a rotating wall cloud. Also, anticyclonic supercells (with mesoanticyclone), which usually are storms that split and move to the left of the parent storm motion, though very rarely spawning tornadoes, spawn anticyclonic tornadoes. There is an increased incidence of anticyclonic tornadoes associated with tropical cyclones, and mesovortices within bow echoes may spawn anticyclonic tornadoes.

The first anticyclonic tornado associated with a mesoanticyclone was spotted on WSR-88D weather radar in Sunnyvale, California on May 4, 1998. The tornado was an F2 on the Fujita Scale.

== Known "anticyclonic tornado" events ==
Date	F#/EF# Rating	Location	Notes and References
8 June 1951	F3	Corn, Oklahoma	First known tornado filmed in the US, a companion or cyclic tornado to another significant tornado. It is officially listed as one tornado event by the CDNS report and the NCDC.
21 April 1974	F4	Oshkosh, Wisconsin	Strongest anticyclonic tornado recorded ever at the time, also was a multiple-vortex tornado.
6 June 1975	F1	Freedom, Oklahoma	One of three tornadoes to touch down in the area.
13 June 1976	F3	Jordan, Iowa	Tornadoes of 1976#June 13 – A satellite tornado to the F5 Jordan, Iowa tornado.
3 June 1980	F1	Grand Island, Nebraska	1980 Grand Island tornado outbreak – First of three anticyclonic tornadoes in the area that night.
3 June 1980	F3	Grand Island, Nebraska	1980 Grand Island tornado outbreak – Second of three anticyclonic tornadoes in the area that night.
3 June 1980	F1	Grand Island, Nebraska	1980 Grand Island tornado outbreak – Last of three anticyclonic tornadoes in the area that night.
4 April 1981	F4	West Bend, Wisconsin	1981 West Bend tornado – Strongest anticyclonic tornado ever recorded.
13 June 1998	F2	North Oklahoma City, Oklahoma	Tornado outbreak of June 13, 1998 – Sixth of seven tornadoes to touch down from the same supercell.
19 April 2002	F0	Lubbock, Texas	"The tornado was produced by an antimesocyclone, which was located on the north flank of a left-split storm."
6 September 2004	F?	Chek-Lap-Kok International Airport, Hong Kong	Described as a marginal tornado.
24 April 2006	F1	El Reno, Oklahoma	Second of two F1 tornado in the area of El Reno Airport.
20 June 2006	F1	Rushville, Nebraska	A house, sheds, and outbuildings were destroyed on a farmstead.
2 October 2007	EF0	Bussey, Iowa	Tornadoes of 2007#October 2 – This brief anticyclonic touched down in an open field southeast of Bussey, doing no damage.
23 May 2009	EF0	Maxwell, Nebraska	Law enforcement reported a landspout tornado north and east of the Maxwell Interstate 80 interchange. The tornado touched down briefly in an open area. Based on radar.
10 May 2010	EF0	Nardin, Oklahoma	Tornado outbreak of May 10–13, 2010 – First of five anticyclonic on this day.
10 May 2010	EF1	Bray, Oklahoma	Tornado outbreak of May 10–13, 2010 – Second of five anticyclonic tornadoes on this day; was very large at times.
10 May 2010	EF1	Southern Norman, Oklahoma	Tornado outbreak of May 10–13, 2010 – Third of five anticyclonic tornadoes on this day; it was likely a satellite tornado to the Norman–Little Axe, Oklahoma EF4 tornado.
10 May 2010	EF1	Wayne, Oklahoma	Tornado outbreak of May 10–13, 2010 – Fourth of five anticyclonic tornadoes on this day; was up to a 1/2 mile (0.80 km) wide and was briefly accompanied by a cyclonic EF0 satellite tornado.
10 May 2010	EF1	Lake Eufaula, Oklahoma	Tornado outbreak of May 10–13, 2010 – Last of five anticyclonic tornadoes on this day; was up to a 5/8 mile (1.0 km) wide.
31 May 2013	EF2	Yukon, Oklahoma	Tornado outbreak of May 26–31, 2013 – A long-lived strong satellite tornado that was southeast of the record-breaking EF3 El Reno tornado.
4 June 2015	EF0	Simla, Colorado	Tornadoes of 2015#June 4 – A brief anticyclonic tornado caused no damage.
4 June 2015	EF0	Kutch, Colorado	Tornadoes of 2015#June 4 – A brief anticyclonic tornado caused no damage.
31 March 2016	EF0	Hohenwald, Tennessee	Tornadoes of 2016#March 30–April 1 – A brief anticyclonic tornado snapped and uprooted trees, downed several large tree branches and inflicted minor roof damage to a home and barn.
5 April 2017	EF1	Shelbyville, Tennessee	Tornadoes of 2017#April 4–6 – A landspout anticyclonic tornado snapped damaged trees, cars, and structures.
15 June 2019	EF0	Johnsonville, South Dakota	Tornadoes of 2019#June 15–16 – This tornado lasted approximately 45 seconds and damaged about seven trees.
13 March 2021	EF1	Canyon, Texas	Tornadoes of 2021#March 13 — A satellite tornado snapped power poles along Interstate 27.
29 July 2021	EF0	Bustleton, Philadelphia, Pennsylvania	Tornado outbreak of July 28–29, 2021 – A weak tornado damaged buildings and trees.
27 August 2021	EF0	Dougherty, Iowa	"This very brief track was found in Sentinel satellite imagery and stayed in fields for its existence. Based on the location in the supercell, inflow wind trajectories along the left side of the track, and striation patterns in the fields, there is a high likelihood that this was an anti-cyclonic tornado."
30 April 2024	EF1	Loveland, Oklahoma	"An anti-cyclonic tornado damaged some trees. Preliminary information."
26 May 2024	EF2	Decatur, Arkansas	A strong anticyclonic tornado that occurred simultaneously with an EF3 tornado to its northwest. Homes were damaged, storage buildings were destroyed, and numerous trees and power poles were snapped.
20 June 2025	EF0	Sanborn, North Dakota	An anticyclonic tornado that occurred simultaneously with the Spiritwood Tornado and on the same night as the Enderlin Tornado.

== See also ==
- Vortex
- Vorticity
- Pressure-gradient force (PGF)
- Rossby number
- Anticyclonic storm
