= Scott, Oklahoma =

Unincorporated community in Oklahoma, US

- Unincorporated community
- Location within Oklahoma
- Coordinates: 35°22′36″N 98°14′11″W
- Country: United States
- State: Oklahoma
- Counties: Caddo and Canadian
- Elevation: 1,540 ft (470 m)
- Time zone: UTC-6 (Central (CST))
  - Summer (DST): UTC-5 (CDT)
- Area code: 405
- GNIS feature ID: 1100819

Scott is an unincorporated community in west-central Oklahoma located on the Caddo - Canadian county line, 7.5 miles (12.1 km) east-northeast of Lookeba. The town is old enough to appear on a 1911 Rand McNally map of the county.

In 1981, a violent wedge tornado struck Scott directly causing major damage.
