= Royal barge =

Vessel used by a monarch for ceremonial processions

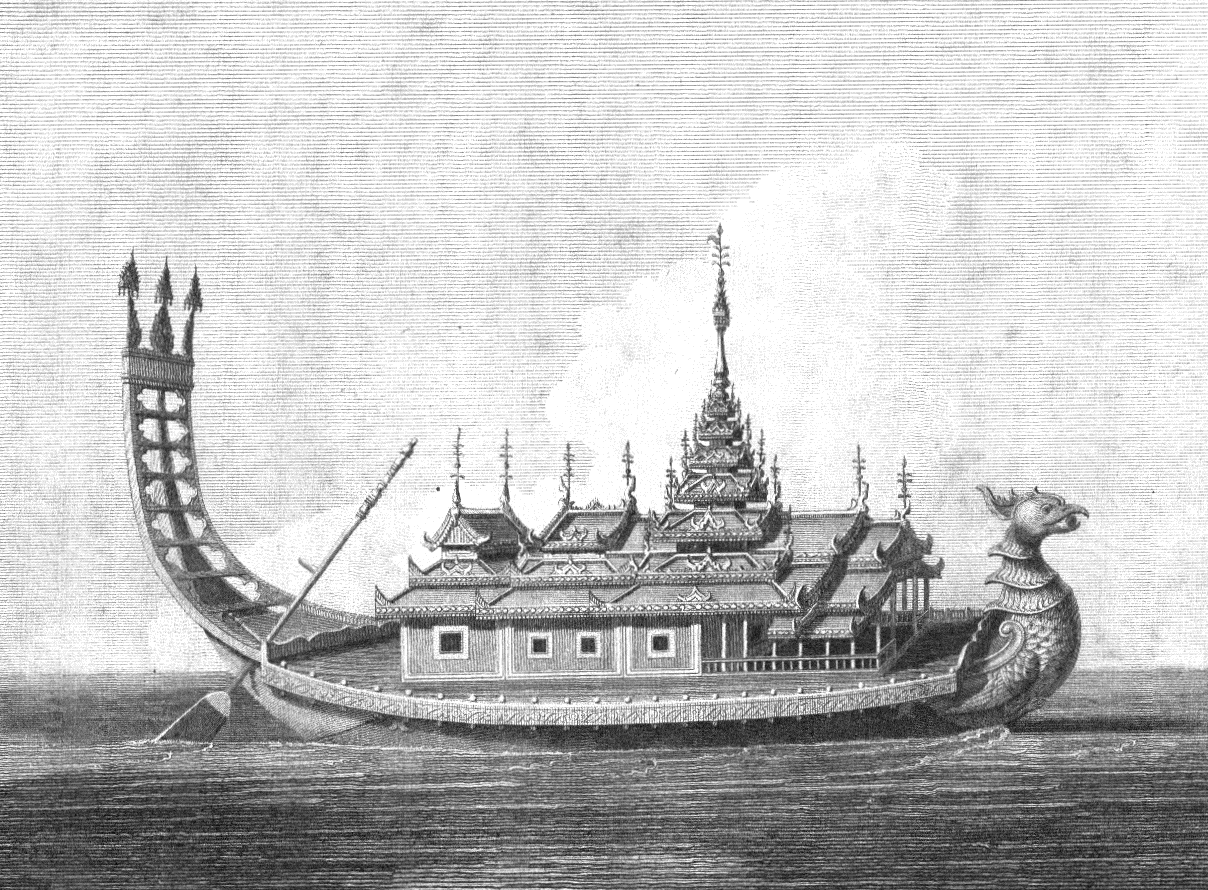
Royal Golden Barge of Burma, 1795

A royal barge is a vessel that is used by a monarch for ceremonial processions, and (historically) for routine transport, usually on a river or inland waterway. It may also be known as a state barge, and may be used on occasion by other members of a royal family, heads of state, or particular VIPs.

Traditionally royal barges were used by European monarchies such as the United Kingdom, France, Belgium, and Sweden, and Southeast Asian monarchies such as Siam, Burma, Brunei, Riau and Cambodia.

In more recent years, royal barges have only been used in the United Kingdom, Sweden and Thailand.

== Belgium ==
In the 19th century, when a head of state visited a port city, it was traditional to invite them aboard a royal barge. This was why the Belgian government decided, on the recommendation of the King Leopold I, to have the Lecarpentier shipyards in Antwerp build a royal barge. Launched on 12 July 1835, Canot Royal carried the royal couple for the first time from Brussels to Antwerp via the Rupel to watch a military flotilla. Subsequently, Leopold I used the Canot Royal during his various trips to Antwerp, Ghent and Ostend. On 10 July 1862, in Antwerp, the Canot Royal brought Prince Louis of Hesse and his wife Princess Alice to the quay on the occasion of their honeymoon aboard the British Royal Yacht Victoria and Albert.

On 5 November 1899, RV Belgica returned to Antwerp. Canot Royal picked up Adrien de Gerlache and his mate, Georges Lecointe, to bring them aboard the mail ship Princess Clémentine, where government officials and their close families waited to greet them. On 7 December 1901, the Canot Royal was retired and disassembled. Parts of the Canot Royal are kept at the Royal Military Museum and at Royal Palace of Brussels.

In 2022 L'Atelier Marin/Maritiem Atelier announced plans to make a replica of the royal barge.

== Burma (Myanmar) ==
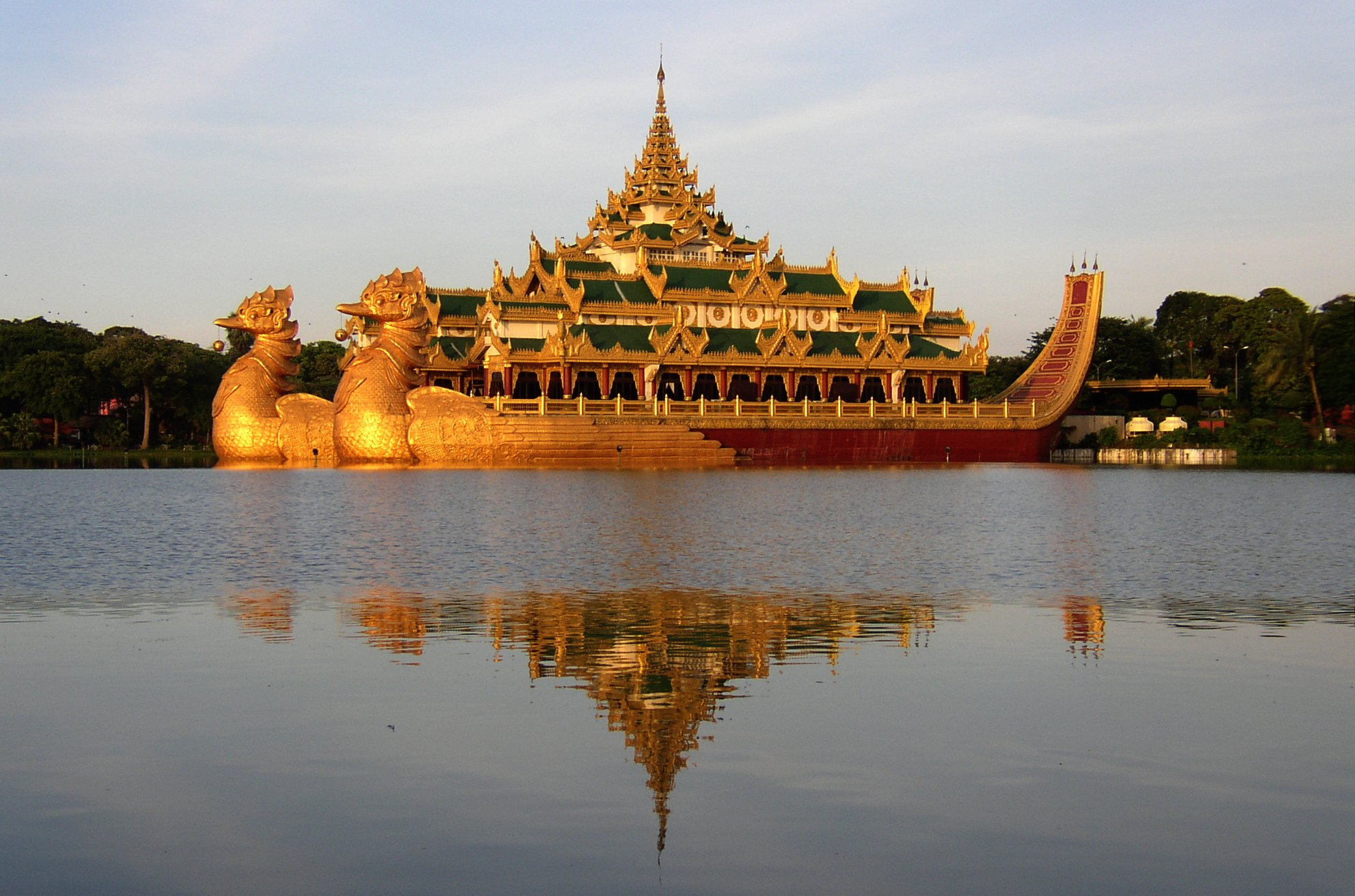
The Karaweik barge on Yangon's Kandawgyi Lake is based on the design of a royal barge.

The royal barge, called phaungdaw (ဖောင်တော်), was of historic importance during the monarchical era, and retains cultural significance in modern-day Myanmar (Burma).

The Karaweik barge on Yangon's Kandawgyi Lake and an iconic symbol of the city, was designed by Burmese architect Ngwe Hlaing, and was based on a royal barge.

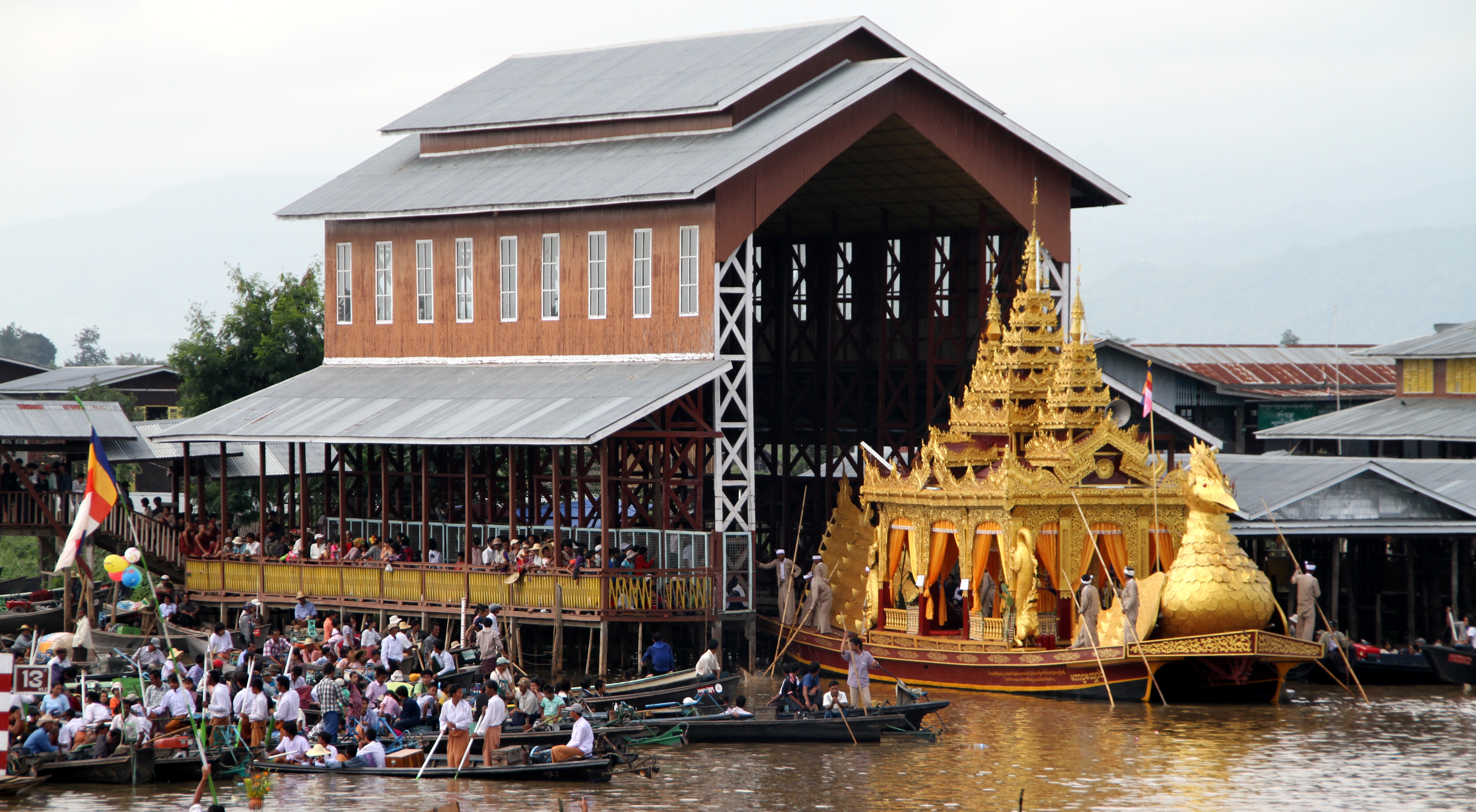
The ceremonial barge used during the Hpaung Daw U Pagoda pagoda festival is modeled after a royal barge.

Hpaung Daw U Pagoda, which is situated on Inle Lake, is known for a major pagoda festival during which four of the Buddha images from the pagoda are placed on a royal barge designed as a hintha bird and taken throughout Inle Lake.

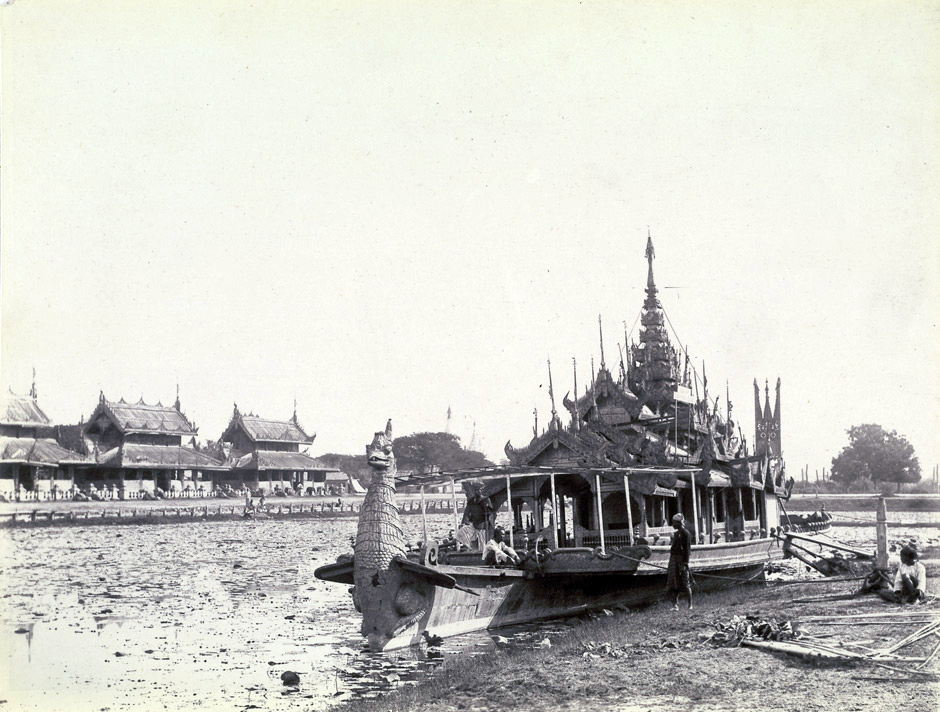
A royal barge moored on the moat surrounding Mandalay Palace.

The royal barge was an important ceremonial possession of the Burmese monarchy, and was used for ceremonial and state affairs, such as a procession around the royal palace moat following a monarch's coronation. By the Konbaung dynasty, several types of royal state barges existed, each distinguished by a specific mythical figurehead at the front of the barge, and each allocated to different members of the royal court:

- Pyigyimon (ပြည်ကြီးမွန်) - two conjoined gilded barges crowned with a seven-tiered roof (pyatthat), with dragon-headed hulls and carved figureheads of the garuda (a mythical bird) and naga (a mythical serpent), and Thagyamin at the center
- Nawarupa (နဝရူပ) - used by the royal ministers and officers, with a figurehead of a nawarupa (a chimeric animal with the mane of a karaweik, the hump of bull, the tail of a ngagyin fish, two elephant tusks, the trunk of a makara, and horns of a toe naya, two wings of parakeet, and a front and hind leg of a horse)
- Nagadewa (နာဂဒေဝ) - used by the royal ministers and officers, with the figurehead of a nagaraja
- Pyinsarupa (ပဉ္စရူပ) - used by the chief queens, a gilt barge with the figurehead of a pyinsarupa (a chimeric animal with the mane of karaweik bird, the tusk and trunk of an elephant, the hump of bull, the tail of a ngagyin fish, and the horns of a toe naya)
- Eni (ဧဏီ) - a barge adorned with the figurehead of a deer
- Hintha (ဟင်္သာ) - used by princes, a barge adorned with the figurehead of a hamsa (mythical bird)
- Udaung (ဥဒေါင်း) - used by princes, a barge adorned with the figure of peacock

The elaborate figureheads and motifs used in Burmese royal barges influenced the construction of increasingly elaborate Siamese royal barges toward the end of the Ayutthaya period.

== Sweden ==
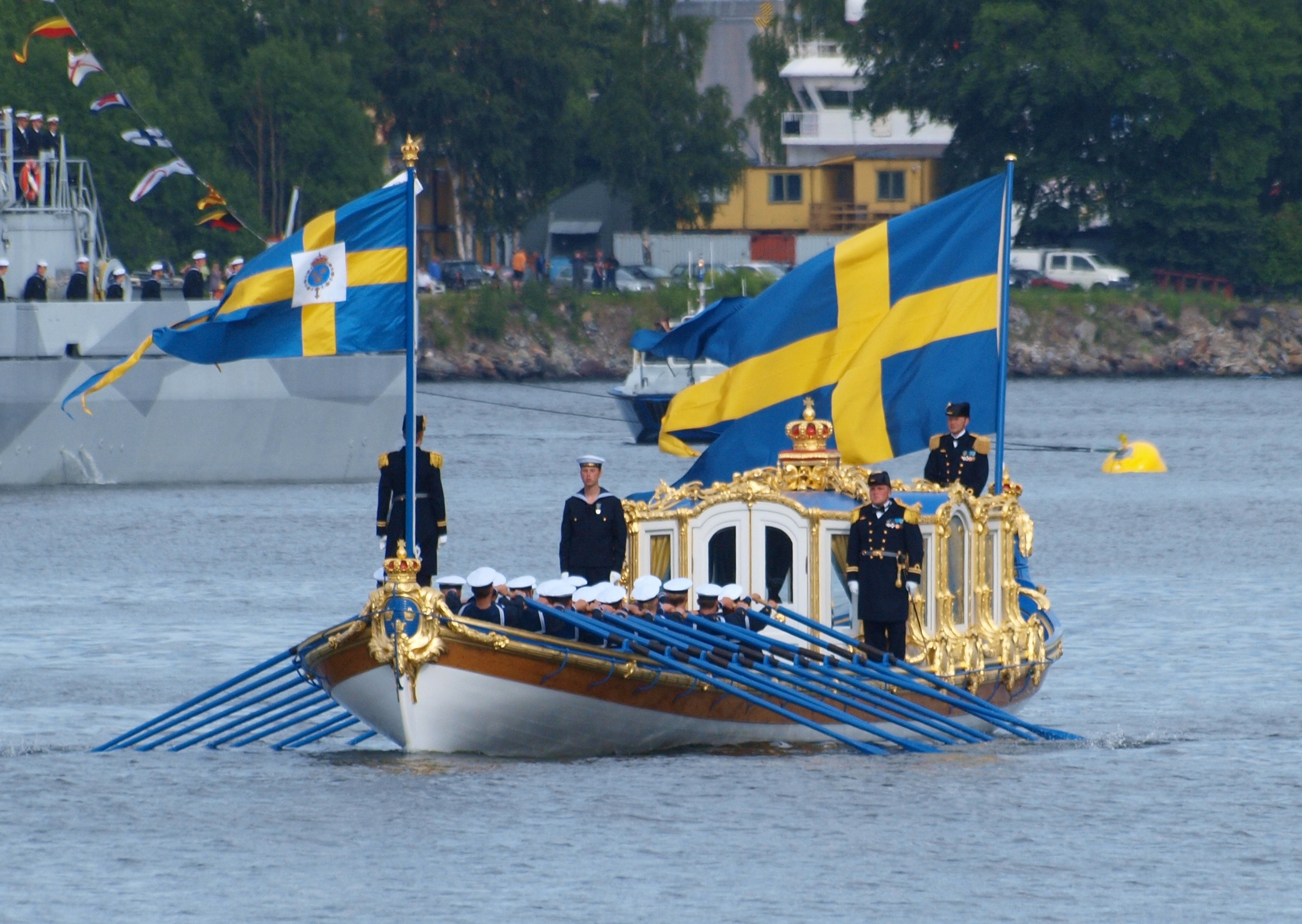
Swedish royal barge Vasaorden, 2010

Vasaorden (The Order of Vasa) is the Swedish royal barge. The original royal barge of this name was built in 1774 on the orders of King Gustav III, to a design by Fredrik Henrik af Chapman, but was destroyed in a dockyard fire in 1921. A private fundraising led to a new barge being constructed in 1923 with the help of the old blueprints. The Vasaorden is owned and operated by the Swedish Navy, is equipped with nine pairs of oars, and is used on special occasions such as state visits and royal weddings.

== Thailand ==
The Royal Barge Procession is a ceremony of both religious and royal significance which has been taking place for nearly 700 years. Some of the royal barges are kept at the National Museum of Royal Barges.

== United Kingdom ==
The Thames was a regular thoroughfare for the sovereign until the middle of the 19th century, on state occasions or between the royal palaces of Windsor, Westminster, Hampton Court, Greenwich and the Tower of London. The travel of the monarch by barge is managed by the King's Bargemaster and Royal Watermen, chosen from the Company of Watermen and Lightermen. Though there is currently no official state barge, a number of boats in recent years have stepped into the role of Royal Barge for various specific ceremonies and occasions:

=== Royal Nore ===
Until 2017 the Royal Nore, owned and maintained by the Port of London Authority, was used whenever a member of the royal family travelled on the River Thames for an official engagement.

The Royal Standard and regalia were displayed when Queen Elizabeth was on board. The Queen was always accompanied by her Bargemaster, along with eight Royal Watermen in full ceremonial dress standing on the fore deck.

Royal Nore was at the centre of the River Progress and Pageant held to celebrate the Queen's Silver Jubilee in June 1977. At the time the vessel was named Nore; she was subsequently renamed Royal Nore in recognition of her service, by royal command. She is permanently berthed at Ocean Terminal, Leith, in Edinburgh, Scotland, alongside the similarly retired royal yacht, HMY Britannia.

=== Royal Shallop Jubilant ===
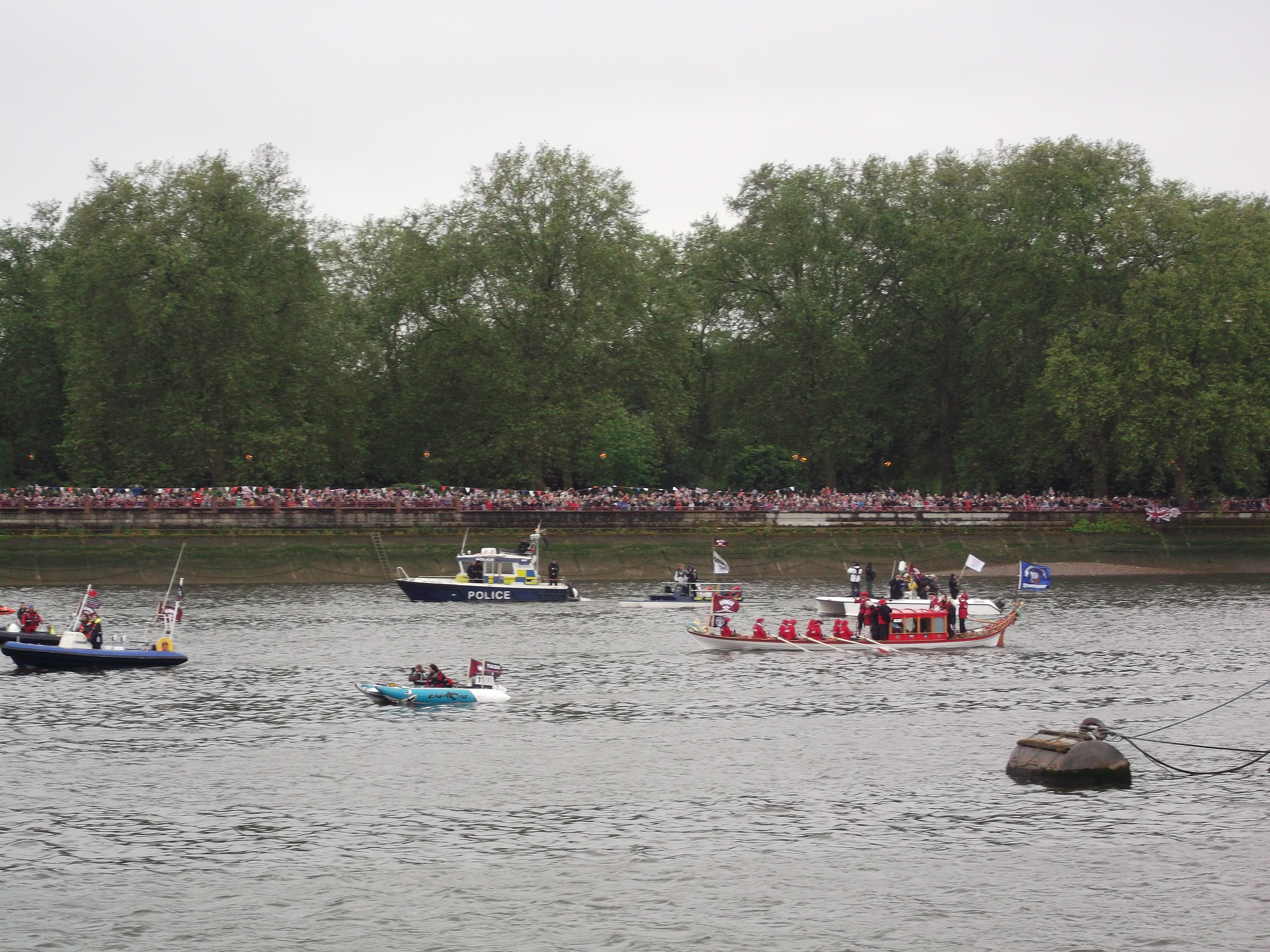
Royal Shallop Jubilant (right)

The Royal Shallop Jubilant was built for the Golden Jubilee of Elizabeth II that took place in 2002. The vessel itself was modelled on the Naval Victualling Commissioners’ Barge held at the National Maritime Museum. It was designed with accessibility in mind, to help those with disabilities and disadvantages take part in rowing.

=== Gloriana ===
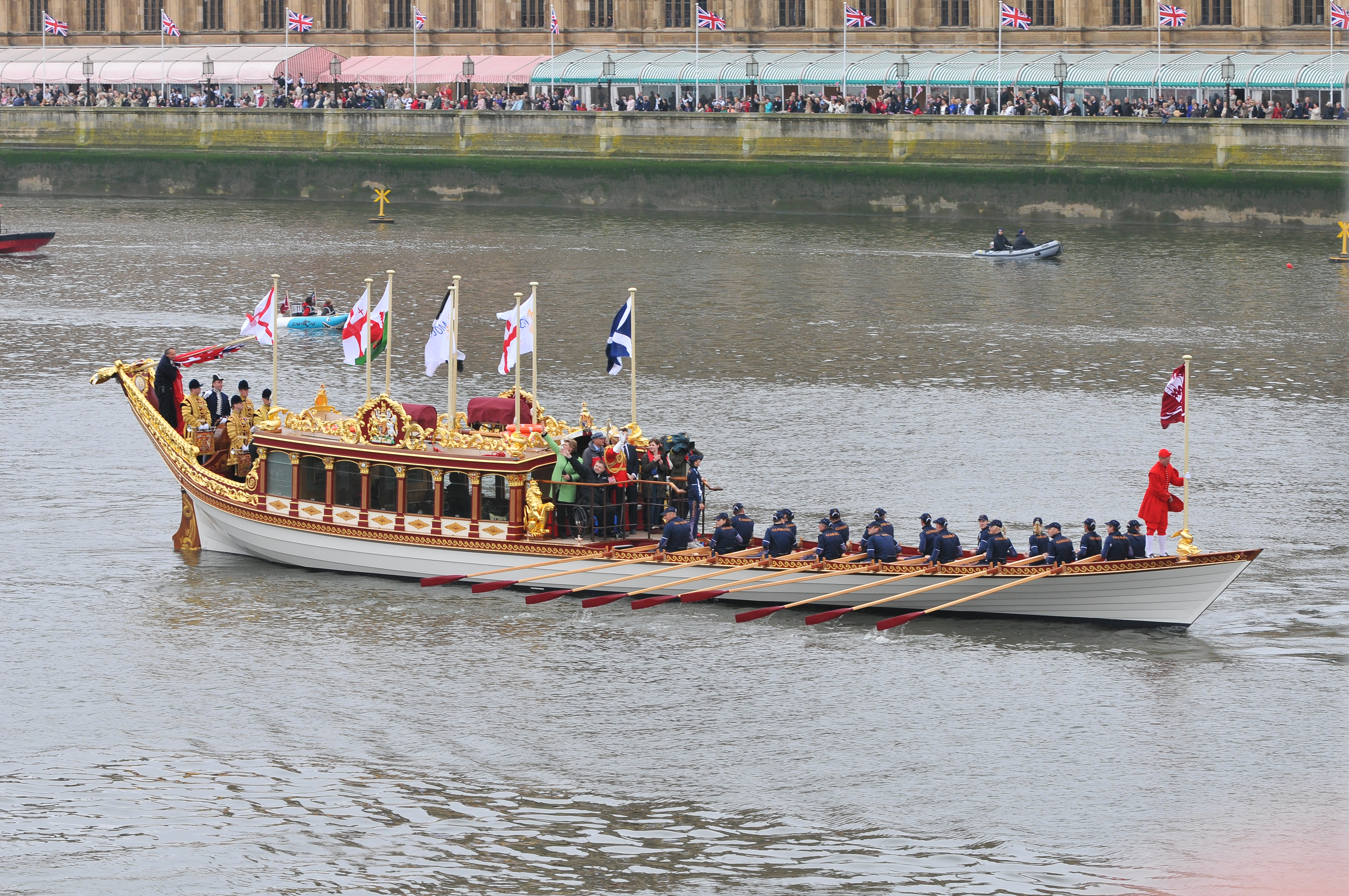
The royal barge Gloriana at the Thames Diamond Jubilee Pageant, 2012

A new royal barge named Gloriana was built in 2011–2012 to mark the Queen's Diamond Jubilee. Gloriana is designated as a royal rowbarge, but is also known as The Queen's Rowbarge (QRB Gloriana). The vessel is normally manoeuvred by 18 crew pulling sitka spruce oars, but it also has two electric motors powered by lithium batteries, which can be used separately or in conjunction with the rowing crew. At the Thames Diamond Jubilee Pageant on 3 June 2012, Glorianna took a leading position in the flotilla, but did not fly the Royal Standard on that day, because Queen Elizabeth II travelled aboard the MV Spirit of Chartwell, which acted as royal barge for the occasion.

=== HMY Britannia, Royal Barge ===
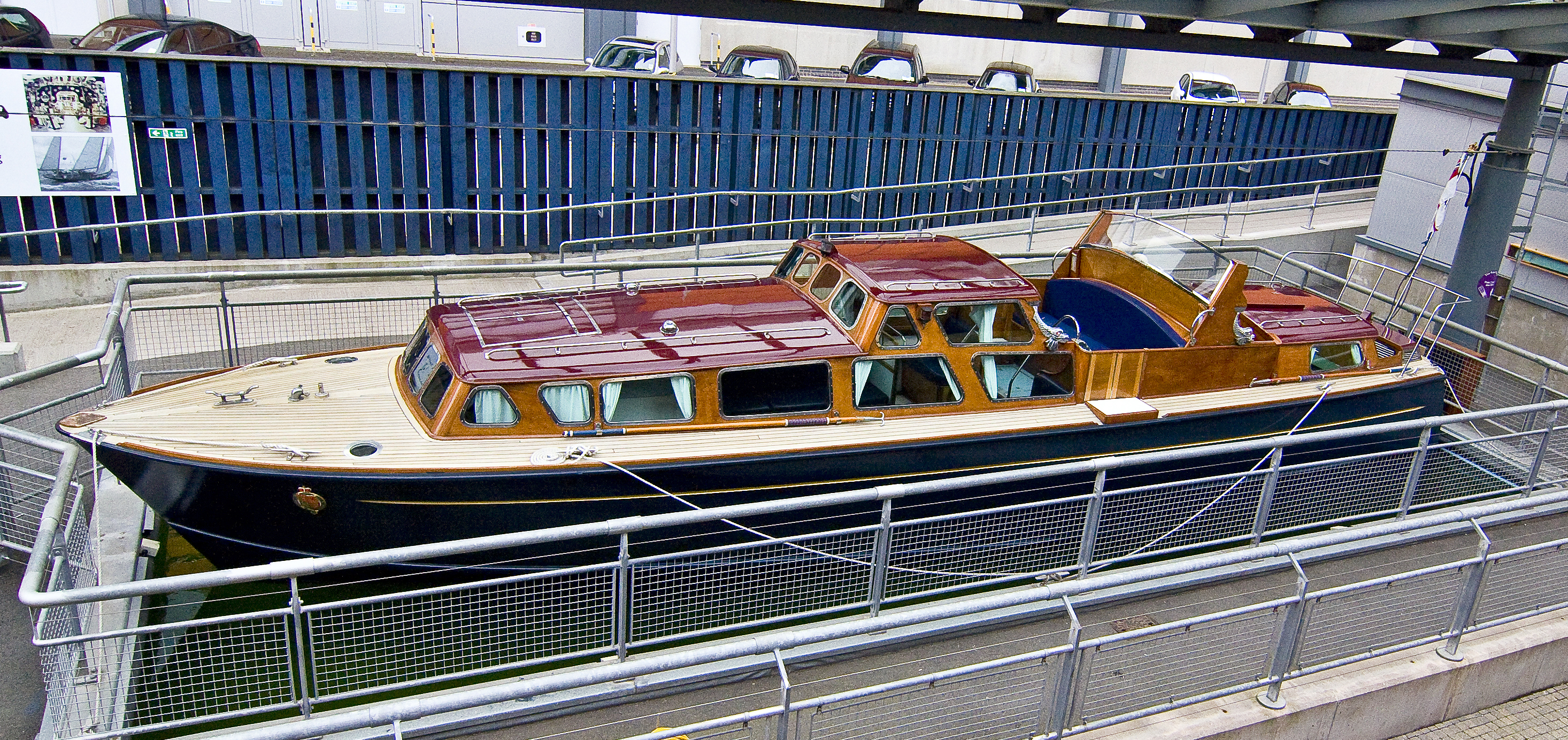
The Royal Barge on display next to the Royal Yacht Britannia

The Royal Barge was a tender for HMY Britannia traditionally used to transport the royal family to and from the royal yacht. As part of the Queen's Diamond Jubilee, the vessel was re-commissioned to take part in the Thames Pageant. The vessel carried the Queen to and from the larger Spirit of Chartwell, along with two Royal Watermen in full ceremonial dress. After the pageant the vessel was returned to Leith to sit on display alongside the Royal Yacht Britannia.

=== MV Spirit of Chartwell ===
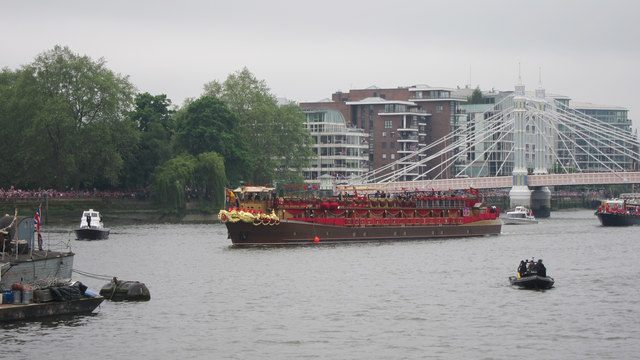
Spirit of Chartwell at the Thames Diamond Jubilee Pageant, 2012

During the celebrations on 3 June 2012, the Queen travelled aboard the MV Spirit of Chartwell, which acted as royal barge for the occasion. A special warrant was issued by the Secretary of State for Defence to permit the MV Spirit of Chartwell to wear the White Ensign whilst serving as the Royal Barge on 3 June 2012. When the Queen was on board, it also flew the Royal Standard of the United Kingdom from the bow.

== See also ==
- Pleasure barge
- Bucentaur, the ceremonial barge of the Venetian doge
- State Barge of Charles II
- Queen Mary's Shallop
- Prince Frederick's Barge

== Sources ==
- Bartram, Graham (2012). "A Visual Guide to the Flags used in the Thames Diamond Jubilee Pageant" (PDF). The Flag Institute. Archived from the original (PDF) on 7 March 2014.
