= King's Bargemaster =

Subordinate officer of the Royal Household

King's Bargemaster of the Royal Household
- Incumbent; Christopher Livett since 2018
- Formation: 1215

The King's Bargemaster is a subordinate officer of the Royal Household of the Sovereign of the United Kingdom. Until the mid-19th century, the Royal Family frequently used a royal barge for transport along the River Thames. The role of the King's Bargemaster was to oversee this. The tradition of the Bargemaster dates back to 1215, with the signing of Magna Carta at Runnymede. The role is now largely ceremonial.

The Bargemaster is responsible for the Royal Watermen, chosen from the ranks of the Thames Watermen who operate tugs and launches on the river. There are 24 Royal Watermen, each of whom receives an annual salary of £3.50.

== Duties ==
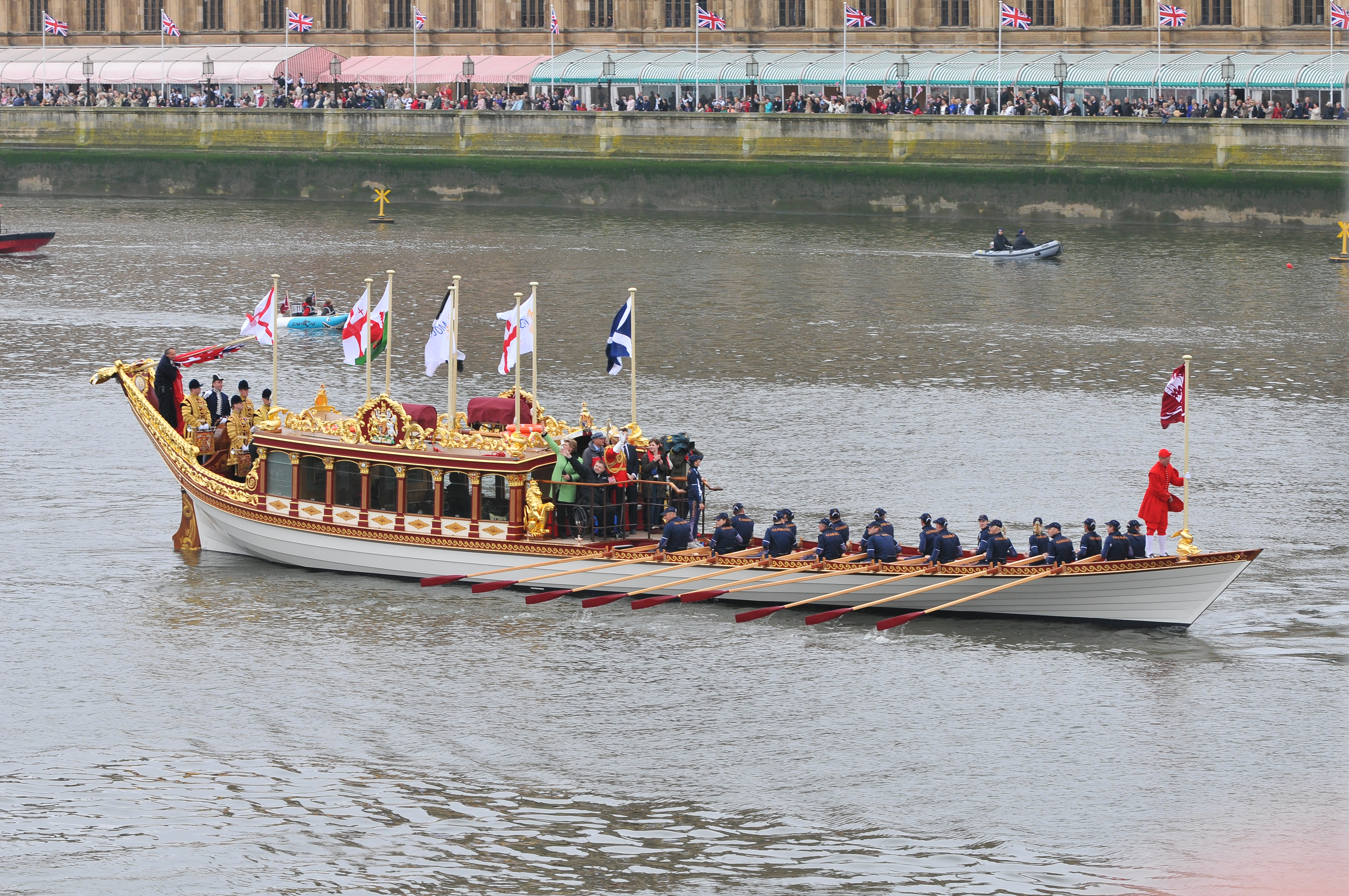
The Royal Barge Gloriana. Queen Elizabeth II's Royal Barge presented to her at her Diamond Jubilee in 2012.

The ceremonial duties include state occasions involving the Thames. In recent years for example, they have helped organise and facilitate river Pageants for the Golden Jubilee and Diamond Jubilee.

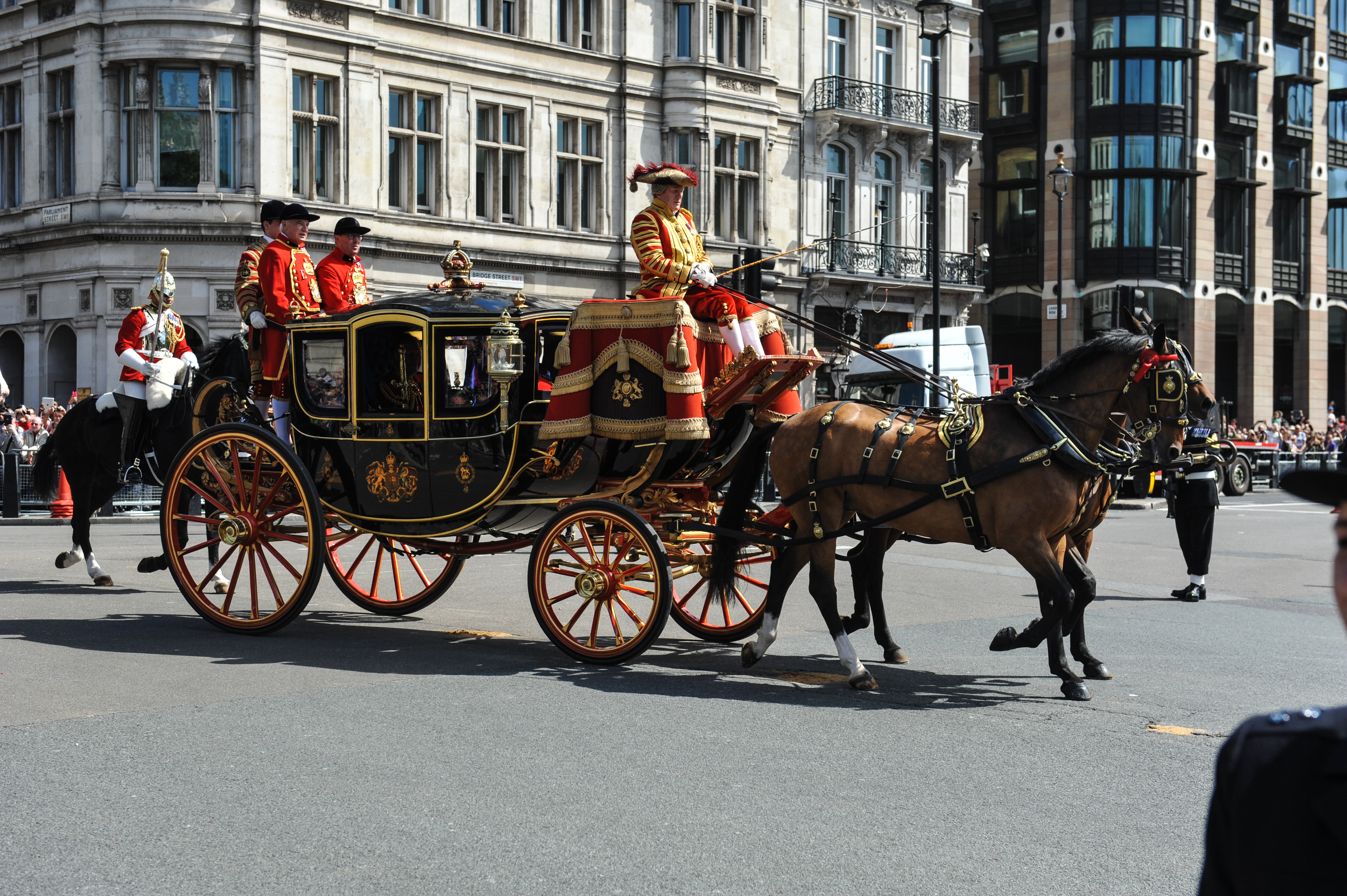
The Queen's Bargemaster and a Royal Waterman (with a royal footman standing behind them) on the carriage conveying the Imperial State Crown to the Palace of Westminster for the State Opening, 2015.

Onshore duties include acting as footmen on royal carriages during State visits, royal weddings and jubilees. At the coronation, the Royal Watermen walk in the procession behind The King’s Bargemaster. At the State Opening of Parliament, the King’s Bargemaster and four Royal Watermen travel as boxmen on coaches, guarding the regalia when it is conveyed from Buckingham Palace to Westminster and back.

The privately owned charter vessel MV Spirit of Chartwell was transformed into a royal barge for the Queen's use during her Diamond Jubilee. On 3 June 2012, the barge carried the Queen, the Duke of Edinburgh and other members of the Royal Family, in the Thames Diamond Jubilee Pageant.

== List of Bargemasters ==
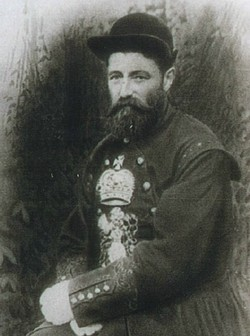
James Arthur Messenger, Barge Master to Her Majesty Queen Victoria 1862–1901

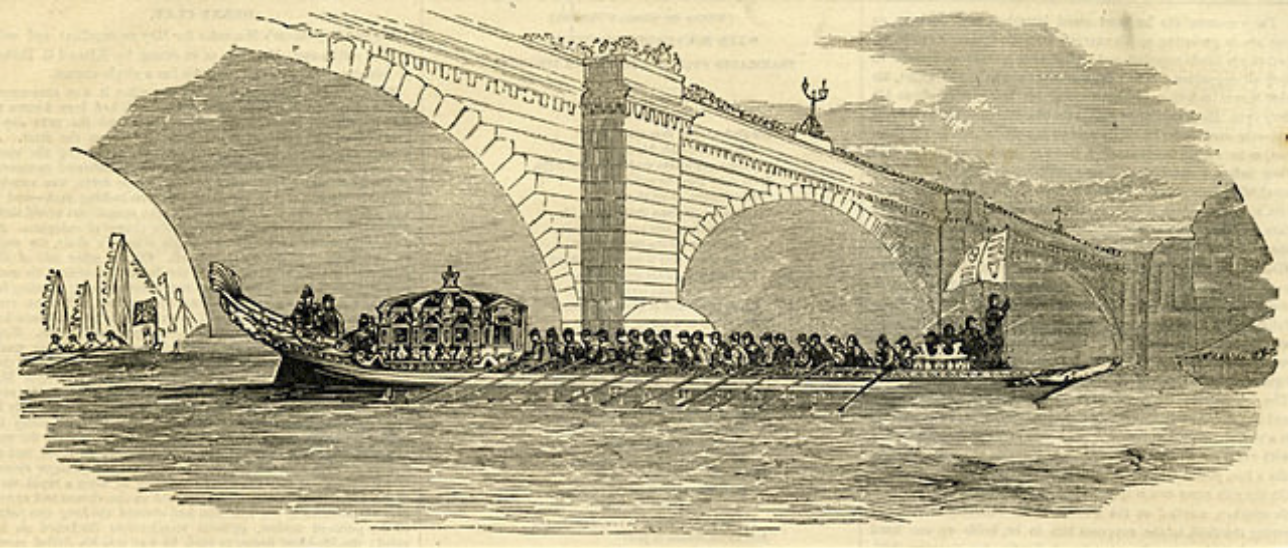
Queen Victoria's Royal Barge. This would have been the barge of which James Messenger was the Master in his service from 1862 to 1901. The photo is of an etching created in 1854.

- Christopher Livett (since 2018)
- Paul Ludwig (2004–c. 2018)
- Kenny Dwan (2003–2004)
- Robert Crouch, MVO (c. 1991–2003)
- Edwin Hunt, MVO (1978–1990)
- Albert Barry, MVO (1951–1977)
- Ernest Barry (1950–1951)
- J. T. Phelps (c. 1938)
- James Messenger (1862–1901)

== See also ==
- Gloriana (barge)
- MV Spirit of Chartwell
