= Ted Hunt =

British retired waterman (1920–2022)

Edwin Hunt MVO
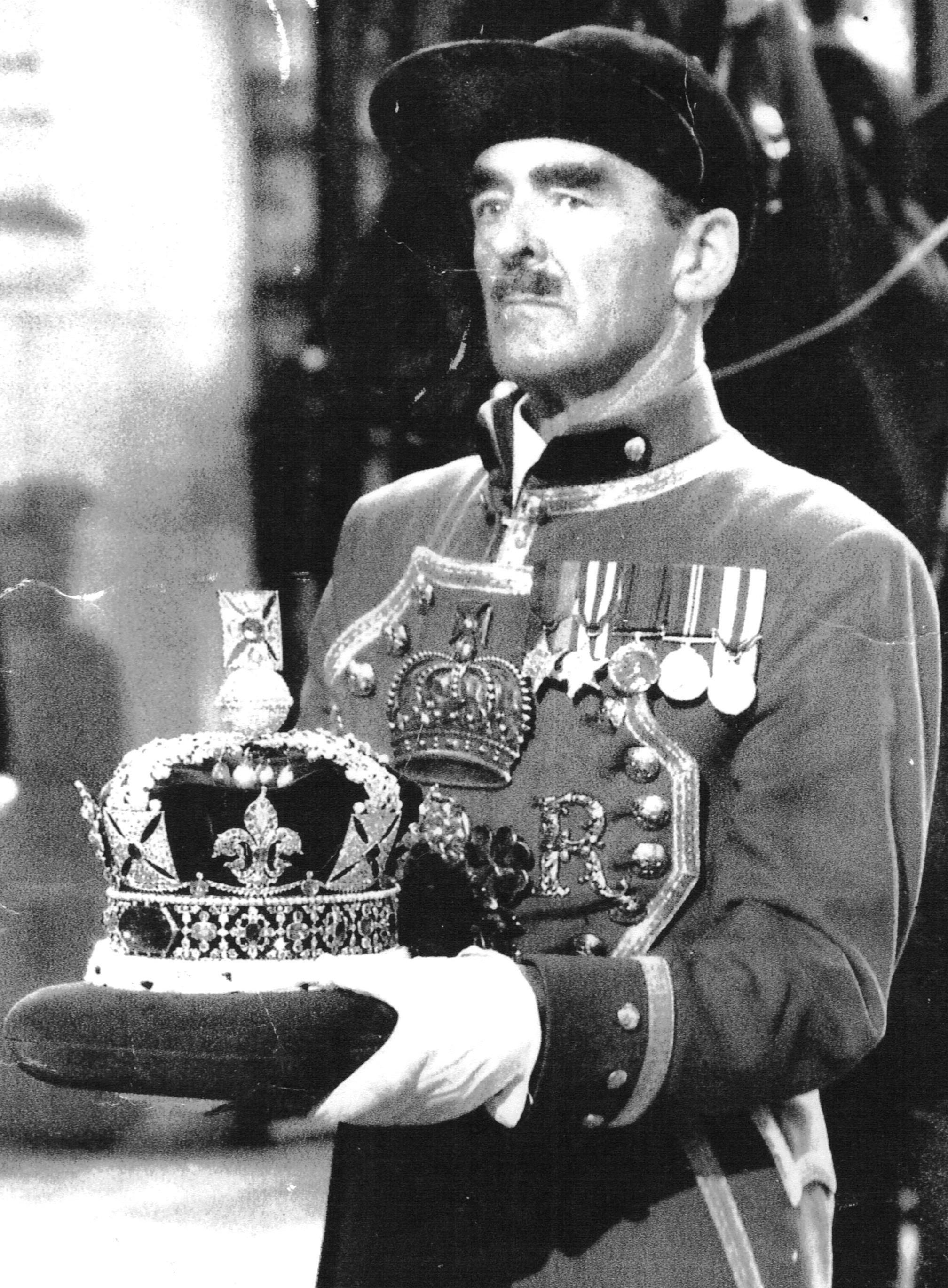
- Born: 23 March 1920; Camden, London, England
- Died: 9 July 2022 (aged 102)
- Military career
- Branch: British Army
- Rank: Major
- Unit: Royal Engineers
- Conflicts: Second World War
- Awards: Member of the Royal Victorian Order
- Other work: Queen's Bargemaster

Edwin Hunt MVO (23 March 1920 – 9 July 2022) was a British waterman who served as a sapper waterman in World War II, and was in 1978, appointed the Queen's Bargemaster.

== Biography ==
Hunt was born in 1920 in the London Borough of Camden, and was bound apprentice to his father as a waterman (lighterman) in 1935 on the River Thames where he learned to tow Thames barges with a rowing-boat. At the time, Hunt recalled in 1993, there were 7000 barges on the river and hundreds of tugs.

Following the outbreak of the Second World War, Hunt volunteered as a sapper waterman in the Royal Engineers, and served in the Battles of Narvik (– part of the Norwegian campaign) – in April–May 1940. By 1944, he was commissioned, and as a captain commanded fifteen of the Rhino ferries on Gold Beach on D-Day. In four months, all sixty-four of these landing craft put ashore 93,000 units (tanks, guns and vehicles) and 440,000 tons of military stores. During the last six months of the war in Europe, together with the Dutch hydraulics engineer Lt. C. L. M. Lambrechtsen van Ritthem, he advised the Chief Engineer Second Army, Brigadier "Ginger" Campbell, on the "opposed crossing of water obstacles", so that the longest floating Bailey bridge of the Second World War could be constructed at Gennep in the Netherlands. This bridge over the river Maas (Meuse) was 4,008 feet (1,222 m) long, and was opened on 19 February 1945.

Demobilized as a major, he returned to civilian life as a college lecturer in navigation and watermanship at the City & East London College in London, from 1948 until 1985. As a Royal Waterman, he was appointed Queen's Bargemaster in 1978 and retired from royal service as a Member of the Royal Victoria Order in 1990.

In March 2019, he was photographed for a World War II project. He died on 9 July 2022, at the age of 102.
