= Karaweik =

Palace in Yangon, Burma

Karaweik Palace
- ကရဝိတ်နန်းတော်
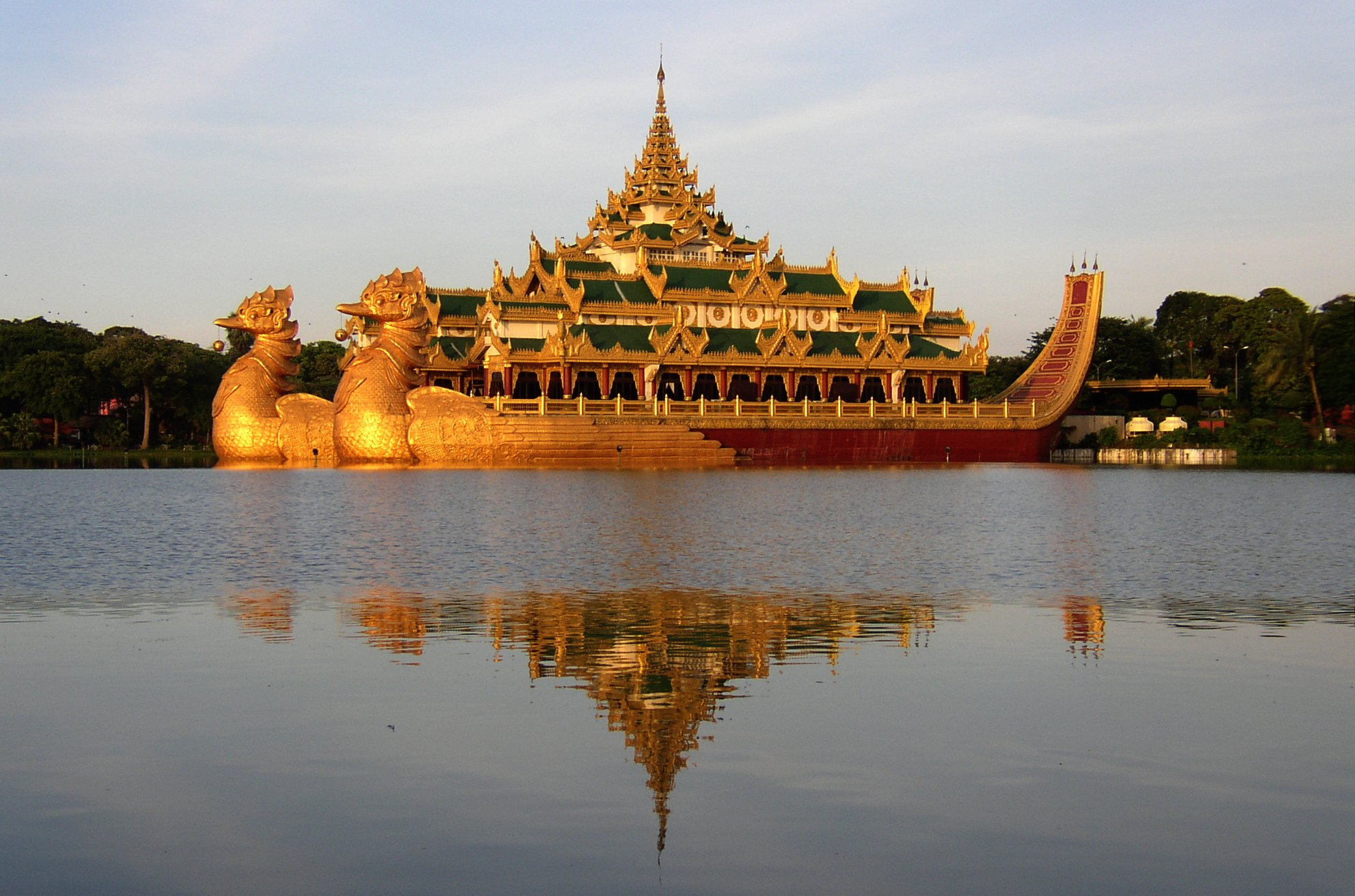
- Karaweik Palace on Kandawgyi Lake

General information
- Type: Cultural hall, restaurant, event venue
- Architectural style: Traditional Burmese architecture
- Location: Kandawgyi Lake, Yangon, Myanmar, Kandawgyi Lake, Nat Mauk Road, Yangon, Myanmar
- Coordinates: 16.7952°N 96.168°E
- Construction started: 1972
- Completed: 1974; 52 years ago
- Client: Government of Myanmar
- Owner: Private leaseholder (since late 1990s)

Technical details
- Floor area: 82 by 39 metres (269 ft × 128 ft)

Design and construction
- Known for: Landmark

Karaweik (Burmese: ကရဝိက် ဖောင် [kəɹəweɪʔ pʰàʊɰ̃]) or Karaweik Hall is a palace on the eastern shore of Kandawgyi Lake, Yangon, Burma.

== Etymology ==
The word karaweik comes from Pali karavika (ကရဝီက), which is a mythical bird with a melodious cry.

== Design ==
The barge was designed by Burmese architect U Ngwe Hlaing, who based it on the Pyigyimon royal barge.

== Construction ==
Construction began in June 1972 and it was finished in October 1974.

== Structure ==
The barge is a two-storied construction of concrete and stucco, reinforced by iron rods, with a pyatthat-topped roof, two reception halls and a conference room. It houses a buffet restaurant today.
