= Royal standard of the United Kingdom =

Flags used by the British monarchy

The Royal Standard of the United Kingdom used outside Scotland

The Royal Standard of the United Kingdom used in Scotland

The royal standard of the United Kingdom is the banner of arms of the monarch of the United Kingdom, currently Charles III. It consists of the shield of the monarch's coat of arms in flag form, and is made up of four quarters containing the arms of the former kingdoms of England, Ireland, and Scotland. There are two versions of the banner, one used in Scotland in which the Scottish quarters take precedence, and one used elsewhere in which the English quarters take precedence. Since the 1960s, personal flags for the monarch in their role as sovereign of other Commonwealth realms have been introduced.

The banner is flown to signify the presence of the monarch. It may be flown when they are present at one of their residences, from the car, ship, or aeroplane they are travelling in, and from any building they are visiting. The banner is never flown at half-mast, as a symbol of the continuity of the monarchy, since there is always a sovereign on the throne.

Although almost universally called a standard, in heraldic terminology the flag is a banner of arms, as it is a coat of arms in flag form; standards are more typically tapering flags on which heraldic badges and mottoes are displayed.

== United Kingdom (outside Scotland), the Crown dependencies, and the British Overseas Territories ==
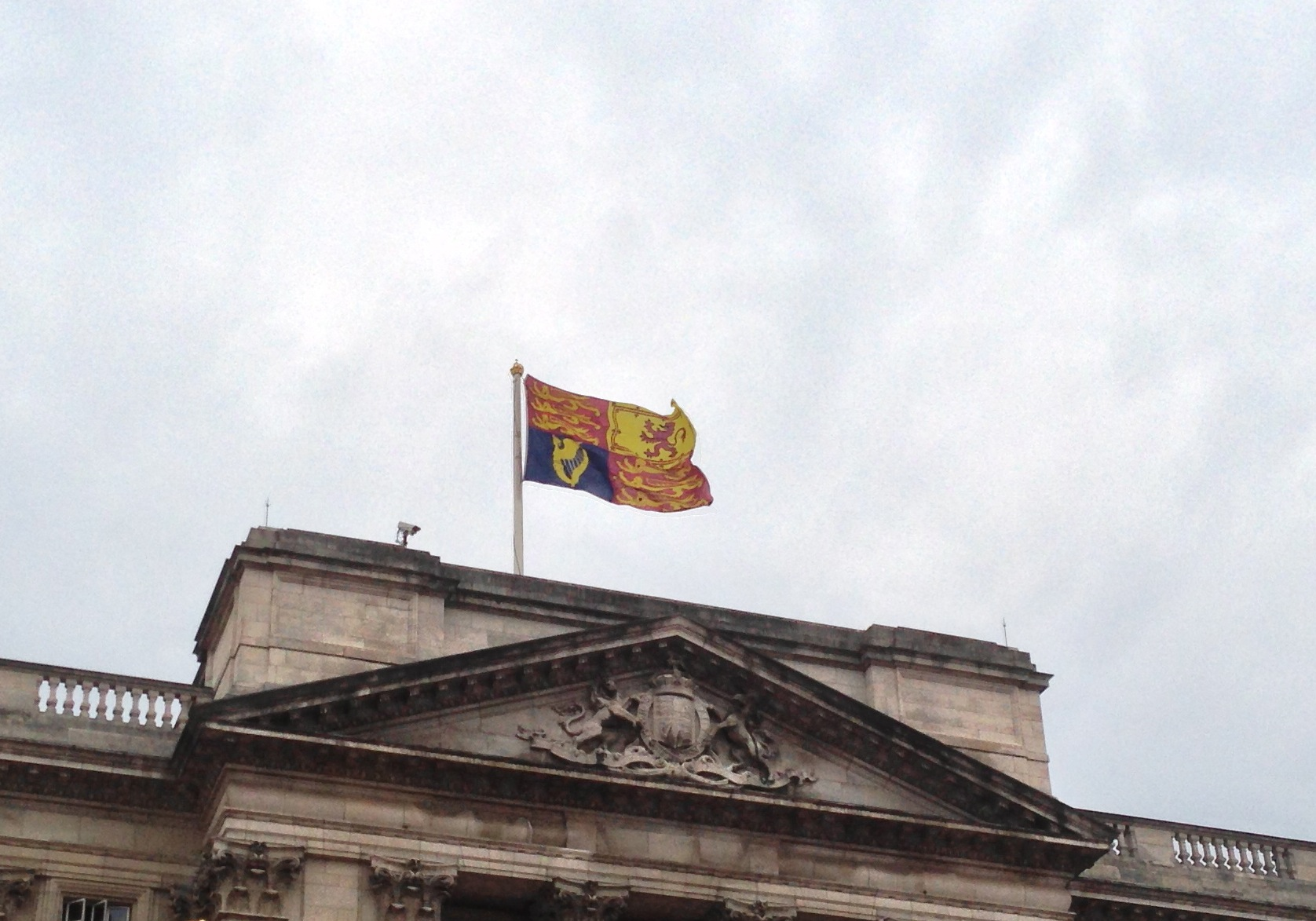
The Royal Standard flying above Buckingham Palace

In England, Northern Ireland, Wales, the Crown dependencies and the British Overseas Territories, the flag is divided into four quadrants. The first and fourth quadrants represent the ancient Kingdom of England and contain three gold lions (or "leopards"), passant guardant on a red field; the second quadrant represents the ancient Kingdom of Scotland and contains a red lion rampant on a gold field; the third quadrant represents the ancient Kingdom of Ireland and contains a version of the gold harp from the coat of arms of Ireland on a blue field. The inclusion of the harp remains an issue for some in Ireland. In 1937 Éamon de Valera, Taoiseach, asked Dominions Secretary Malcolm MacDonald if the harp quarter could be removed from the Royal Standard on the grounds that the Irish people had not given their consent to the Irish emblem being included. The request was denied, and the golden harp of Ireland remains.

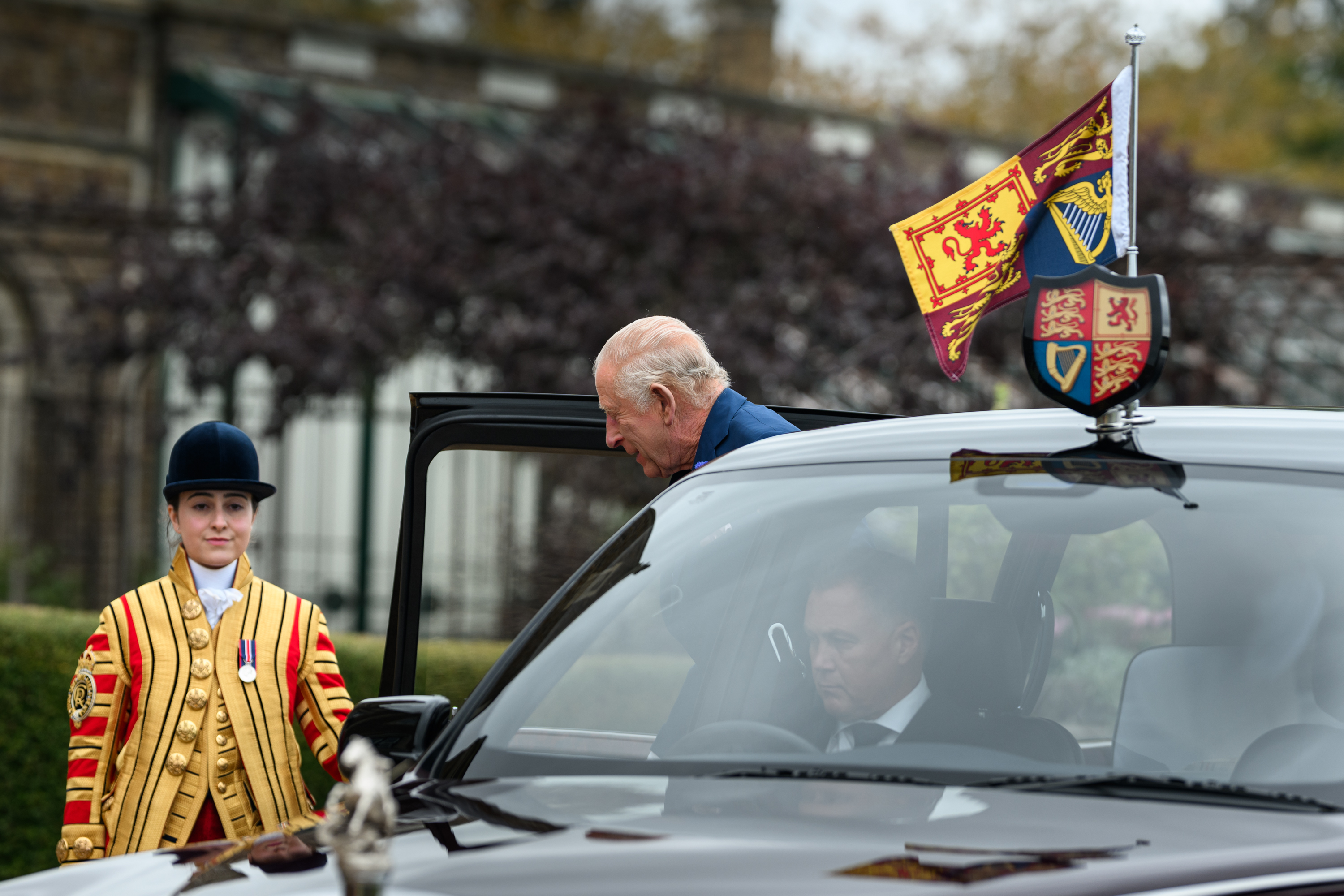
The Royal Standard being used on the official vehicle of Charles III, 2025

The modern Royal Standard of the United Kingdom, apart from minor changes (notably to the form of harp used to represent Ireland), dates to the reign of Queen Victoria. Earlier Royal Standards of the United Kingdom incorporated the Arms of Hanover and of the Kingdom of France, representing the title of Elector (later King) of Hanover and the theoretical claim to the throne of France, a claim dropped in 1800). The Hanoverian association terminated in 1837 with the accession of Queen Victoria who, being female, could not accede to Hanover under Salic law.

Famous Royal Standards of former British Monarchs include the Scotland Impaled Royal Standard of Queen Anne, the Hanover Quartered Royal Standards of King George I to George III, and the Hanover crowned Royal Standards of George III to William IV. The latter contained the Royal coat of arms of Hanover superimposed over what became the modern Royal Standard of the United Kingdom, although this particular standard's artistic representations of the banners of England, Ireland and Scotland in their respective quadrants was marginally different from the versions used today.

== Scotland ==
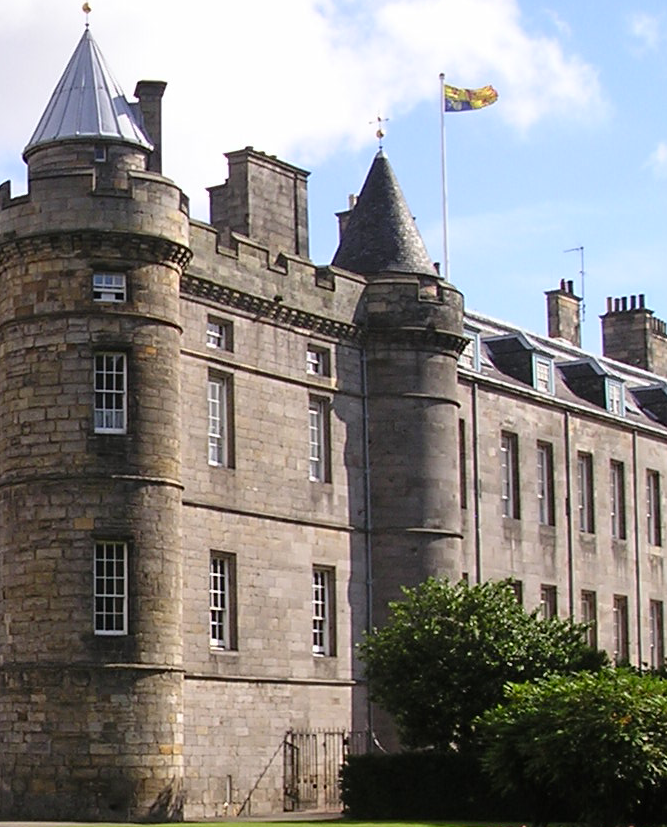
The Royal Standard used in Scotland flying above the Palace of Holyroodhouse

Since 1998 (the year in which Scottish devolution legislation was enacted) a separate version of the Royal Standard of the United Kingdom has been used by the monarch in Scotland, whereby the red Lion Rampant of the Kingdom of Scotland appears in the first and fourth quadrants, displacing the three gold lions passant guardant of England, which occur only in the second quadrant. The third quadrant, displaying the gold harp of Ireland, remains unaltered from that version used throughout the remainder of the United Kingdom and overseas. (Previously the same version of the standard was used throughout the United Kingdom).

The Scottish version of the Royal Standard was used to cover the coffin of Queen Elizabeth II during the journey from Balmoral to Edinburgh on 11 September 2022, during the procession on the Royal Mile from the Palace of Holyroodhouse to St. Giles' Cathedral on 12 September, and throughout the lying-at-rest period at St. Giles’, where the Royal Standard was surmounted by the Crown of Scotland, prior to being flown by the Royal Air Force to London on 13 September. During the flight from Edinburgh Airport to RAF Northolt, London, the Scottish version of the Royal Standard was replaced by the Royal Standard used in the rest of the United Kingdom.

Other members of the British royal family also use this Scottish version when in Scotland (except for the Duke of Rothesay who as the heir apparent has his own individual standard and individual banner).

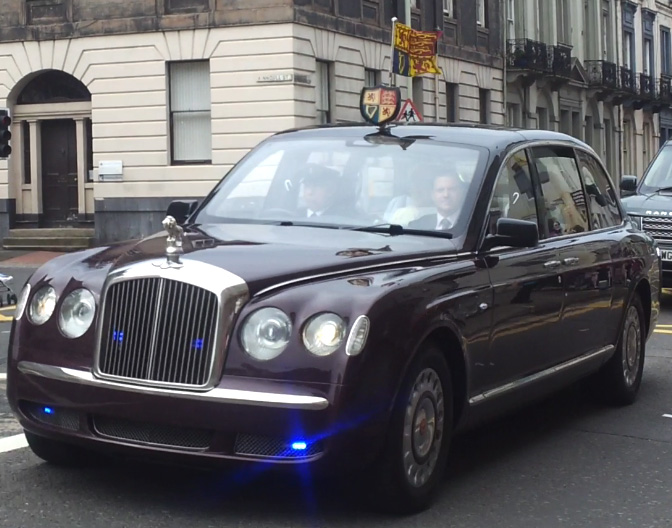
The Royal Standard (Scottish version) being used on the official vehicle of Elizabeth II, 2012

The Royal Standard of the United Kingdom used in Scotland differs from the Royal Standard of Scotland, which portrays the Lion Rampant in its entirety. As the banner of the Royal Coat of Arms of Scotland, the Royal Standard of Scotland remains a personal banner of the monarch and, despite being commonly used as an unofficial second flag of Scotland, its use is restricted under an act passed in 1672 by the Parliament of Scotland. However, in 1934, George V issued a royal warrant authorising use of the Royal Banner of Scotland during the Silver Jubilee celebrations, due to take place the following year; such use being restricted to hand-held flags for "decorative ebullition" as a mark of loyalty to the Monarch.

A variation of the Royal Standard of Scotland is used by the heir apparent to the King of Scots, the Duke of Rothesay, whose personal Royal Standard is the Royal Standard of Scotland defaced with an azure-coloured label of three points. (The personal banner of the Duke of Rothesay also features the same, displayed upon an inner shield, overlying the arms of Stewart of Appin).

The historic Royal Standard of Scotland is used officially at Scottish royal residences, when the monarch is not in residence, and by representatives of the Crown, including the First Minister, Lord Lieutenants in their lieutenancies, the Lord High Commissioner to the General Assembly of the Church of Scotland, and Lord Lyon King of Arms.

== Heir to the Throne ==
The direct heir to the Throne has several distinct standards and banners for use throughout the United Kingdom in representation of this position. William, Prince of Wales has five standards at use for his various roles and titles.

Standard	Title	Description
	Prince of Wales	The Royal Standard of the United Kingdom, defaced with a three-point label in white. Superimposed is the arms of Llywelyn the Great – four quadrants, the first and fourth with a red lion on a gold field, and the second and third with a gold lion on a red field – the inescutcheon is crowned with the Prince's coronet. Used in England and Northern Ireland, this banner was created in 1917.
	Prince of Wales	The arms of Llywelyn the Great, on a green inescutcheon the Prince's coronet. Used in Wales, this banner was created in 1962 at the suggestion of Prince Philip.
	Prince and Great Steward of Scotland, Lord of the Isles	The arms of Stewart of Appin, on an inescutcheon those of the Duke of Rothesay. Used in Scotland, this banner was created in 1974 at the suggestion of Prince Charles.
	Duke of Rothesay	The Royal Standard of Scotland, defaced with a three-point label in blue. As used in the Kingdom of Scotland, this remains the ancient banner of the Duke of Rothesay, the heir apparent to the King of Scots.
	Duke of Cornwall	The flag is "sable fifteen bezants Or", that is, a black field bearing fifteen gold coins. Used in Cornwall, the banner of arms of the Duchy of Cornwall are themselves based upon the ancient arms of Richard of Cornwall.

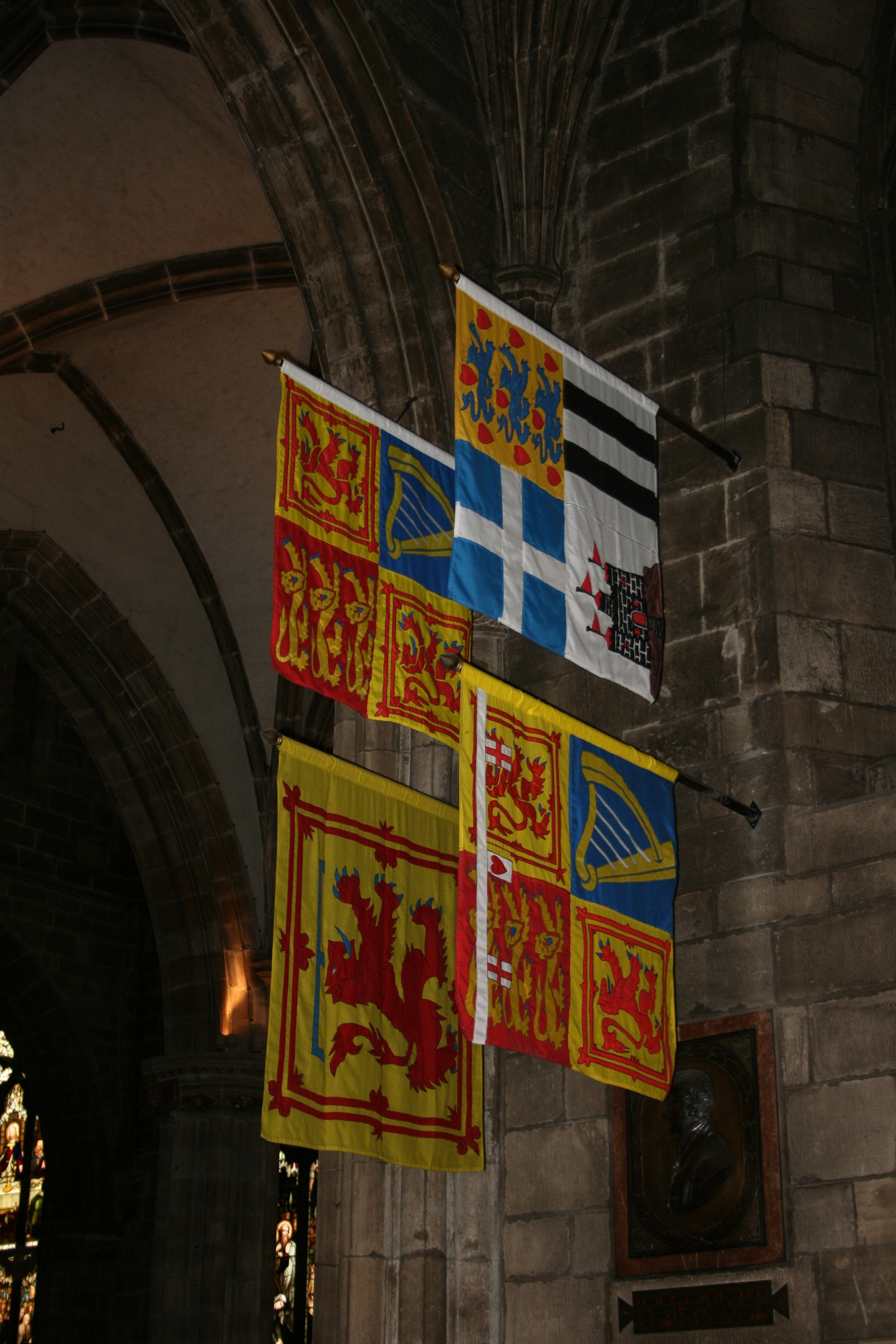
Royal Standard of the Duke of Rothesay, (Lower left), in St Giles' Cathedral, Edinburgh

Historic

Standard	Title	Description
	Prince of Wales	The Royal Standard of the United Kingdom, defaced with a three-point label in white. Superimposed is the coat of arms of the Royal House of Saxony. This standard was designated for the Prince of Wales from 1859 to 1917, at which time King George V renamed the royal family from the House of Saxe-Coburg and Gotha to the House of Windsor and renounced all German titles and claims in an act of British patriotism related to the ongoing First World War.

== Other members of the royal family ==
Other members of the royal family have personal standards of their own. These are variants of the Royal Standard of the United Kingdom (including that which is used in Scotland), defaced with a white label and either three points or pendants (for children of a sovereign), or five points (grandchildren of a sovereign). Traditionally all princes and princesses of royal blood (i.e., descendants of the sovereign) are granted arms on their 18th birthday, thus giving them a banner to fly from their residences.

The following members of the royal family have personal standards, listed according to the line of succession:

Standard	Member of the royal family	Description
	Prince Harry, Duke of Sussex	A three-point label, with each point charged with a red escallop taken from the arms of his mother Diana, Princess of Wales
	Prince Harry, Duke of Sussex	Scottish variant
	Andrew Mountbatten-Windsor	A three-point label, the second point charged with a blue anchor
	Andrew Mountbatten-Windsor	Scottish variant
	Princess Beatrice	A five-point label, the first, third and fifth points charged with a bee
	Princess Beatrice	Scottish variant
	Princess Eugenie	A five-point label, the first, third and fifth points charged with a Scottish thistle
	Princess Eugenie	Scottish variant
	Prince Edward, Duke of Edinburgh	A three-point label, the second point charged with a Tudor rose
	Prince Edward, Duke of Edinburgh	Scottish variant
	Anne, Princess Royal	A three-point label, the first and third points charged with the Cross of St. George, the second point charged with red heart
	Anne, Princess Royal	Scottish variant
	Prince Richard, Duke of Gloucester	A five-point label, the first, third and fifth points charged with the Cross of St. George, the second and fourth points charged with a lion passant guardant
	Prince Richard, Duke of Gloucester	Scottish variant
	Prince Edward, Duke of Kent	A five-point label, the first, third and fifth points charged with a blue anchor, the second and fourth points charged with the Cross of St. George
	Prince Edward, Duke of Kent	Scottish variant
	Prince Michael of Kent	A five-point label, the first, third and fifth points charged with the Cross of St. George, the second and fourth points charged with a blue anchor
	Prince Michael of Kent	Scottish variant
	Princess Alexandra, The Honourable Lady Ogilvy	A five-point label, the first and fifth points charged with a red heart, the second and fourth points charged with a blue anchor, the third point charged with the Cross of St. George
	Princess Alexandra, The Honourable Lady Ogilvy	Scottish variant

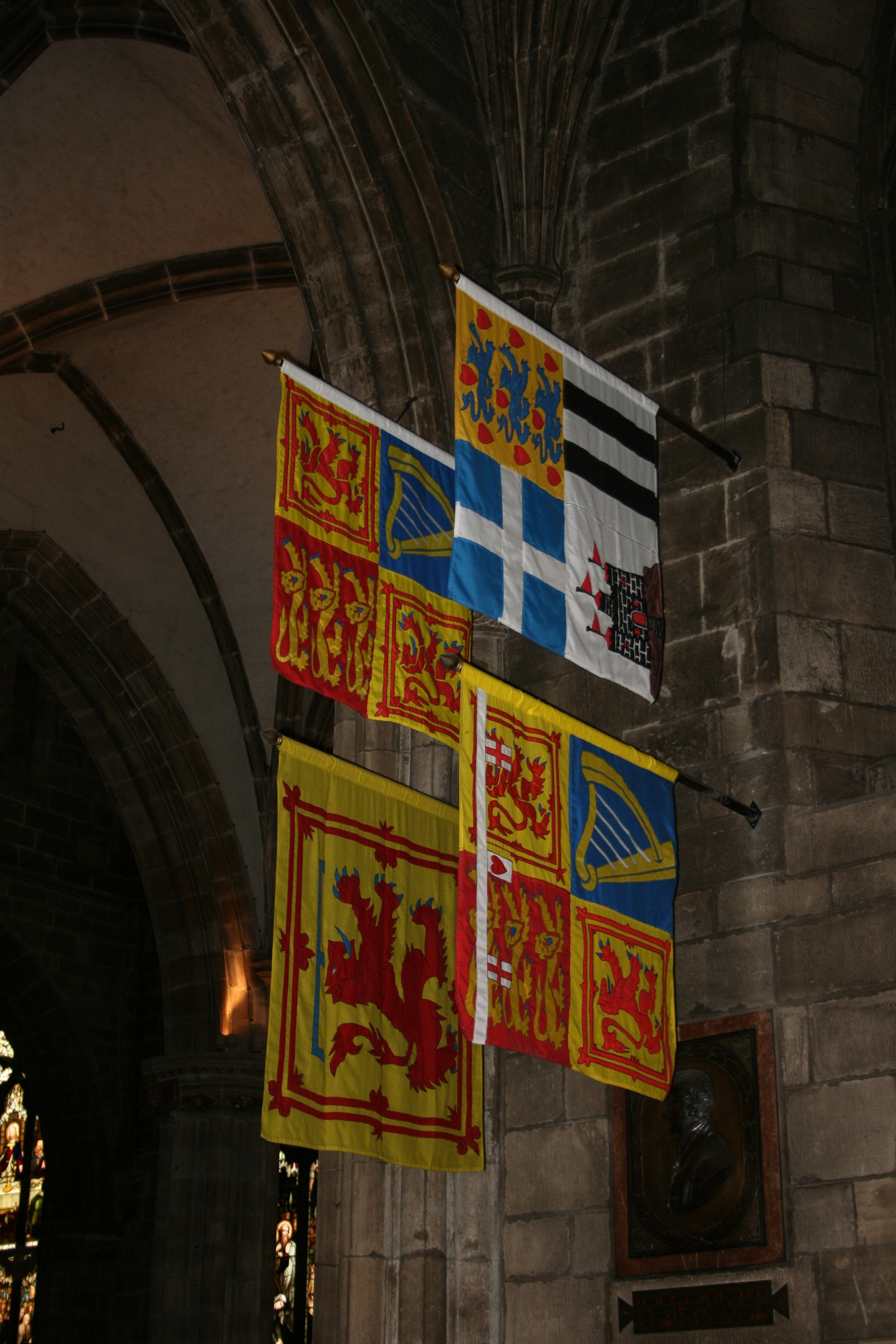
Personal standard (Scottish version) of Anne, Princess Royal, (Lower right), in St Giles' Cathedral, Edinburgh

=== Consorts of the British monarch ===
Queens consort of the British monarch are granted arms based on the Royal Standard and their own personal arms from before their marriage, or the arms of their family. In Scotland, a queen consort will use the Scottish version of the Royal Standard. They do not have different standards for the Commonwealth realms that have their own Royal Standards.

Consorts of a queen regnant are not granted use of the British Royal Standard. They use standards based on their own family arms. However, Prince Albert of Saxe-Coburg-Gotha used a standard of the royal arms (with a label for difference) quartered with his own family arms.

Standard	Consort	Details
	Queen Camilla; Consort of Charles III (2022–present)	The Royal Standard impaled with her father's arms
	Queen Camilla; Consort of Charles III (2022–present)	Royal Arms of Scotland impaled with her father's arms (for use in Scotland)
	Prince Philip; Consort of Elizabeth II (1952–2021)	The Standard is based on his Greek and Danish roots. The flag is divided into four quarters: The first quarter, representing Denmark, consists of three blue lions passant and nine red hearts on a yellow field. The second quarter, representing Greece, consists of a white cross on a blue field. The third quarter, representing the duke's surname, Mountbatten, contains five black and white vertical stripes. The fourth quarter, which alludes to his title as Duke of Edinburgh, includes a black and red castle, which is also part of the city of Edinburgh's arms.
	Queen Elizabeth; Consort of George VI (1936–2002)	The Royal Standard, impaled with the arms of her father, Claude Bowes-Lyon, Earl of Strathmore and Kinghorne.
	Queen Mary; Consort of George V (1910–1953)	The Royal Standard, impaled with the arms of her father, Francis, Duke of Teck, quartered with the Hanoverian coat of arms as used by her grandfather, Prince Adolphus, Duke of Cambridge.
	Queen Alexandra; Consort of Edward VII (1901–1925)	The Royal Standard, impaled with the royal coat of arms of Denmark.
	Prince Albert; Consort of Victoria (1840–1861)	The Royal Standard defaced with a three-point label (with the second point charged with the Cross of St. George), quartered with the arms of Saxony.
	Queen Adelaide; Consort of William IV (1830–1849)	The Royal Standard from 1816 to 1837, impaled with the arms of her father, Duke George I of Saxe-Meiningen.
	Queen Caroline; Consort of George IV (1820–1821)	The Royal Standard from 1816 to 1837, impaled with the arms of her father, Charles William Ferdinand, Duke of Brunswick.
	Queen Charlotte; Consort of George III (1761–1818)	The Royal Standard from 1816 to 1837, impaled with the arms of her father, Duke Charles Louis Frederick of Mecklenburg-Strelitz.
	Queen Charlotte; Consort of George III (1761–1818)	The Royal Standard from 1801 to 1816, impaled with the arms of her father, Duke Charles Louis Frederick of Mecklenburg-Strelitz.
	Queen Charlotte; Consort of George III (1761–1818)	The Royal Standard from 1714 to 1801, impaled with the arms of her father, Duke Charles Louis Frederick of Mecklenburg-Strelitz.
	Queen Caroline; Consort of George II (1727–1737)	The Royal Standard from 1714 to 1801, impaled with the arms of her father, John Frederick, Margrave of Brandenburg-Ansbach.

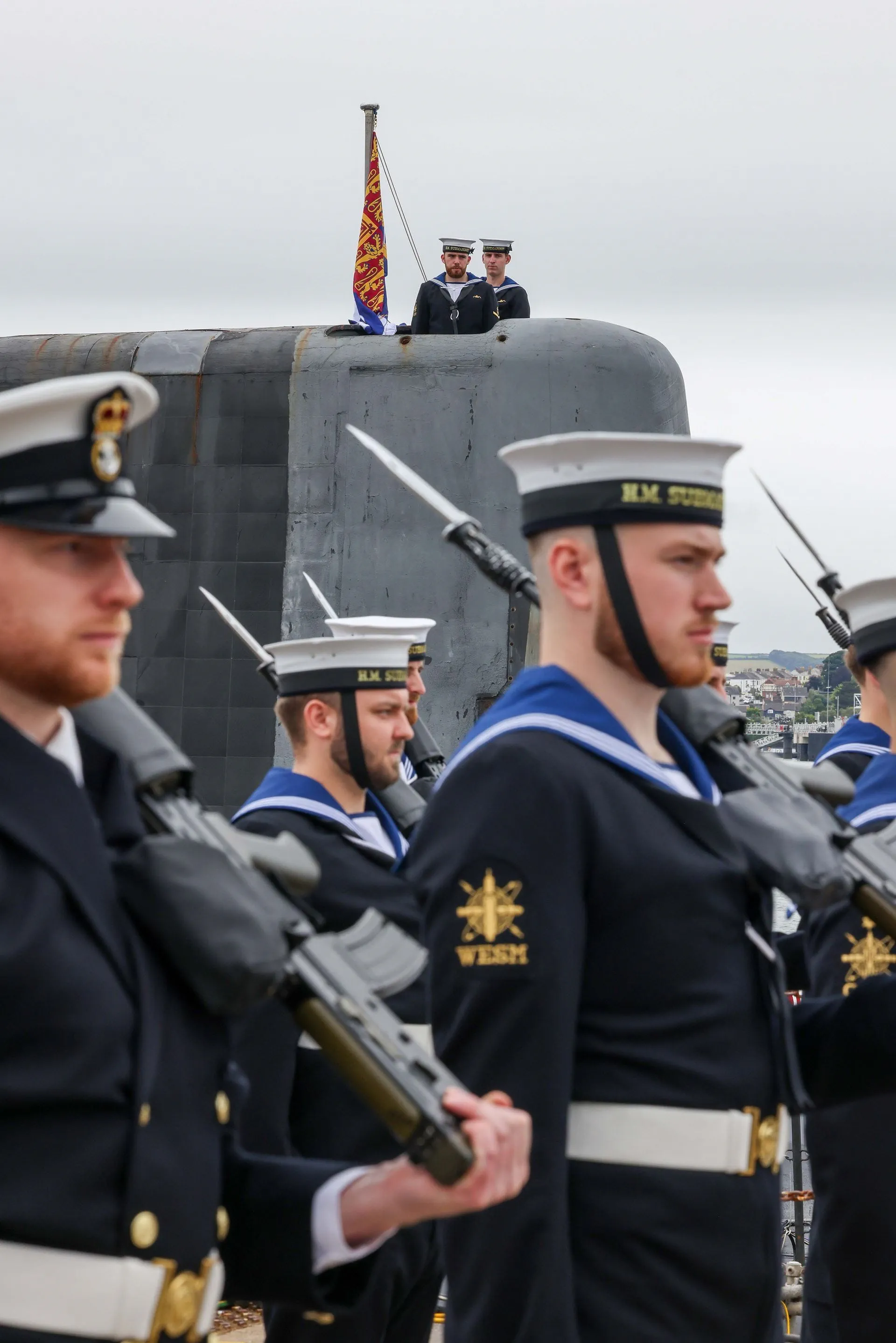
Queen Camilla's banner flies on HMS Astute in 2025

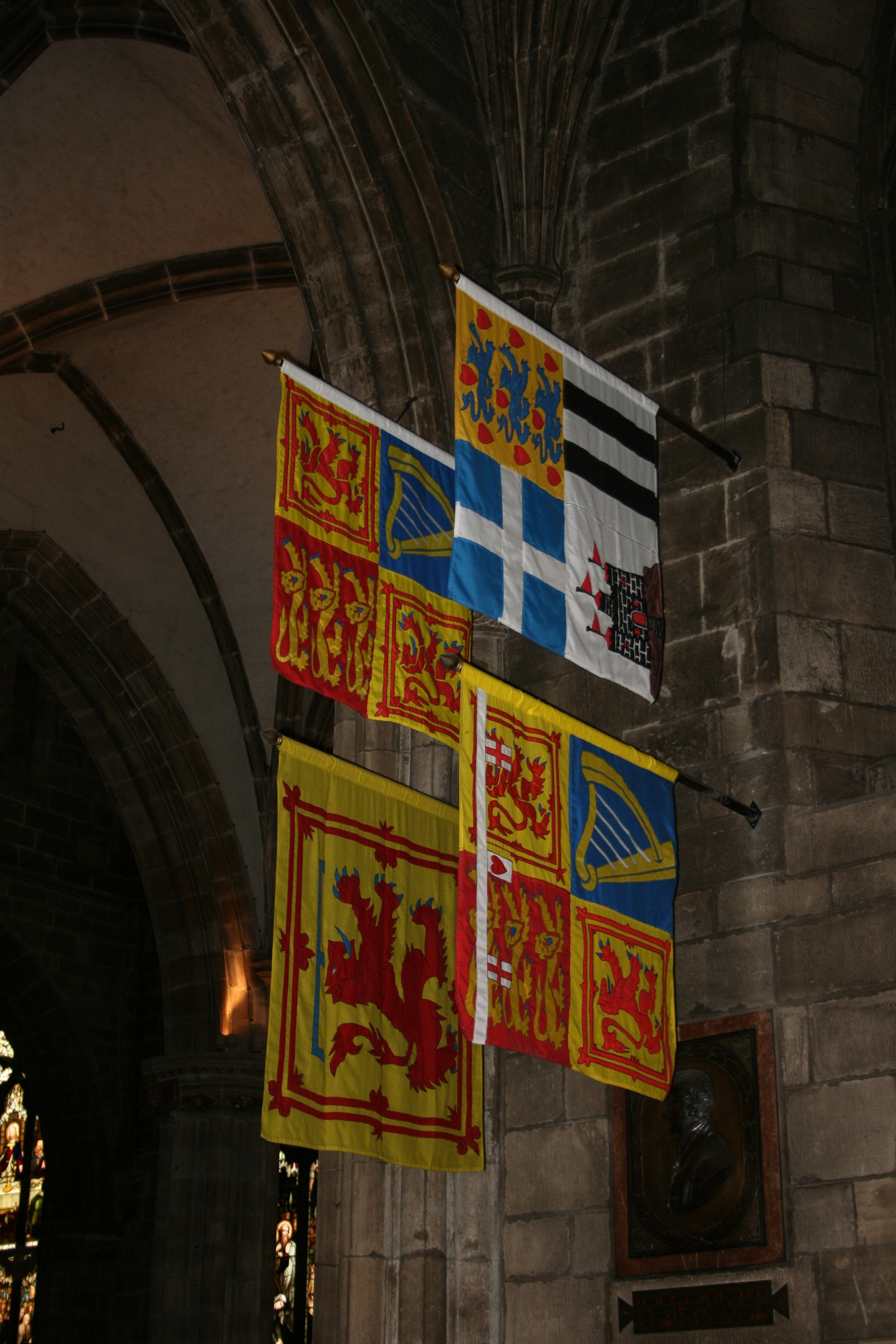
Personal banner of Prince Philip, Duke of Edinburgh, (Upper right), in St Giles' Cathedral, Edinburgh

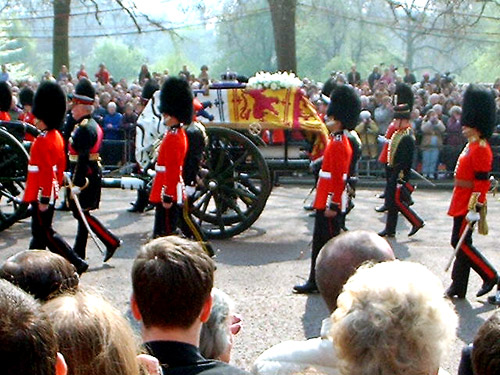
Funeral carriage of Queen Elizabeth The Queen Mother, with the coffin draped with her personal standard

=== Recent historical royal standards ===
Standard	Member of the royal family	Description
	Prince William, Duke of Cambridge	A three-point label, signifying a direct heir to the throne, the second point charged with a red escallop taken from the arms of his mother, Diana, Princess of Wales.
	Prince William, Duke of Cambridge	Scottish variant
	Princess Elizabeth, Duchess of Edinburgh	A three-point label, the first and third points charged with the Cross of St. George, the second point charged with a Tudor rose.
	Princess Margaret, Countess of Snowdon	A three-point label, the first and third points charged with a Tudor Rose, the second point charged with a Scottish thistle.
	Princess Margaret, Countess of Snowdon	Scottish variant
	Philip, Duke of Edinburgh	The Royal Standard, impaled with the arms of his wife, Princess Elizabeth, Duchess of Edinburgh
	Prince Albert, Duke of York	A three-point label, the second point charged with a blue anchor
	Princess Mary, Princess Royal and Countess of Harewood	A three-point label, the first, second and third points charged with the Cross of St. George.
	Prince Henry, Duke of Gloucester	A three-point label, the first and third points charged with the Cross of St. George, the second point charged with a lion passant guardant.
	Prince George, Duke of Kent	A three-point label, the first, second and third points charged with a blue anchor.
	Princess Alice, Countess of Athlone	A five-point label, the first, second, fourth and fifth points charged with a red heart, the third point charged with the Cross of St. George.
	Prince Edward, Duke of Windsor	A three-point label, the second point charged with the Crown of Saint Edward.
	Prince Arthur, Duke of Connaught and Strathearn	A three-point label, the first and third points charged with fleurs-de-lis, the second point charged with the Cross of St. George. Superimposed is the coat of arms of the Royal House of Saxony.
	Prince Arthur, Duke of Connaught and Strathearn	A three-point label, the first and third points charged with fleurs-de-lis, the second point charged with the Cross of St. George.
	Prince Arthur of Connaught	A five-point label, the first, third and fifth points charged with the Cross of St. George, the second and fourth points charged with fleurs-de-lis. Superimposed is the coat of arms of the Royal House of Saxony.
	Prince Arthur of Connaught	A five-point label, the first, third and fifth points charged with the Cross of St. George, the second and fourth points charged with fleurs-de-lis.

=== Royal standards of English and (from 1707) British monarchs, 1198–1837 ===
Flag	Date	Use	Description
	1198–1340	Royal Banner of King Richard I	Gules three lions passant guardant in pale Or armed and langued Azure, meaning three gold lions with blue tongues and claws, walking and facing the observer, arranged in a column on a red background. It forms the first and fourth quarters of the Royal Standard of the United Kingdom.
	1340–1395; 1399–1406	Royal Banner of King Edward III	The Coat of Arms of England quartered with the Royal Standard of France, the fleurs-de-lis representing the English claim to the French throne.
	1395–1399	Royal Banner of King Richard II	The Coat of Arms of England impaled with attributed Arms of King Edward The Confessor (symbolising mystical union).
	1406–1422; 1461–1470; 1471–1554; 1558–1603	Royal Banner of King Henry IV, King Henry V, King Edward IV, King Richard III, King Henry VII, King Henry VIII and Queen Elizabeth I	The French quartering has been altered to three fleurs-de-lis.
	1422–1461; 1470–1471	Royal Banner of King Henry VI	The Coat of Arms of France impaled with the Coat of Arms of England.
	1554–1558	Royal Banner of Queen Mary I and King Philip	The Coat of Arms of Habsburg Spain impaled with the Coat of Arms of England.
	1603–1689; 1702–1707	Royal Standard of the House of Stuart, used first by James VI and I	A banner of the Royal Coat of Arms of James VI and I, first and fourth quarters representing England and the English claim to the French throne, second quarter representing Scotland, third quarter representing Ireland. This was the last royal banner of the Kingdom of England.
	1689–1694	Royal Standard of King William III and II and Queen Mary II	A banner of the joint Royal Coat of Arms of William III and Mary II, consisting of the Coat of Arms of England defaced with an inescutcheon for the House of Nassau (representing William) and impaled with another undefaced version of the same Coat of Arms (representing Mary).
	1694–1702	Royal Standard of King William III and II	A banner of the Royal Coat of Arms of William III, first and fourth quarters representing England and the English claim to the French throne, second quarter representing Scotland, third quarter representing Ireland, with an inescutcheon for the House of Nassau.
	1707–1714	Royal Standard of Queen Anne, after the Acts of Union 1707	A banner of the Royal Coat of Arms of Queen Anne, first and fourth quarters representing (newly unified) England and Scotland, second quarter representing the British claim to the French throne, third quarter representing Ireland.
	1714–1801	Royal Standard of the House of Hanover, first used by King George I	A banner of the Royal Coat of Arms of Great Britain, first quarter representing England and Scotland, second quarter representing the British claim to the French throne, third quarter representing Ireland, fourth quarter representing the Electorate of Hanover.
	1801–1816	Royal Standard of the House of Hanover, used by King George III	A banner of the Royal Arms from the creation of the United Kingdom on 1 January 1801; first and fourth quarters for England and Wales, second Scotland, third Ireland, with an inescutcheon for the Electorate of Hanover.
	1816–1837	Royal Standard of the House of Hanover, first used by King George III	The Royal Arms after Hanover had become a kingdom. The ducal hat is replaced with a crown.

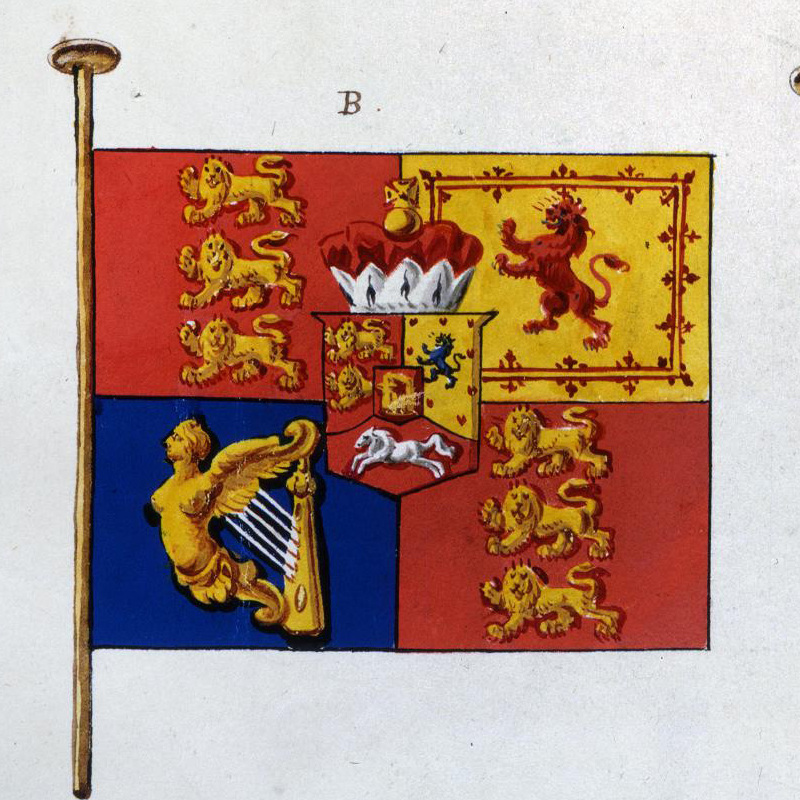
The royal standard prepared by the College of Arms for the approval of George III, in use from 1801 to 1816

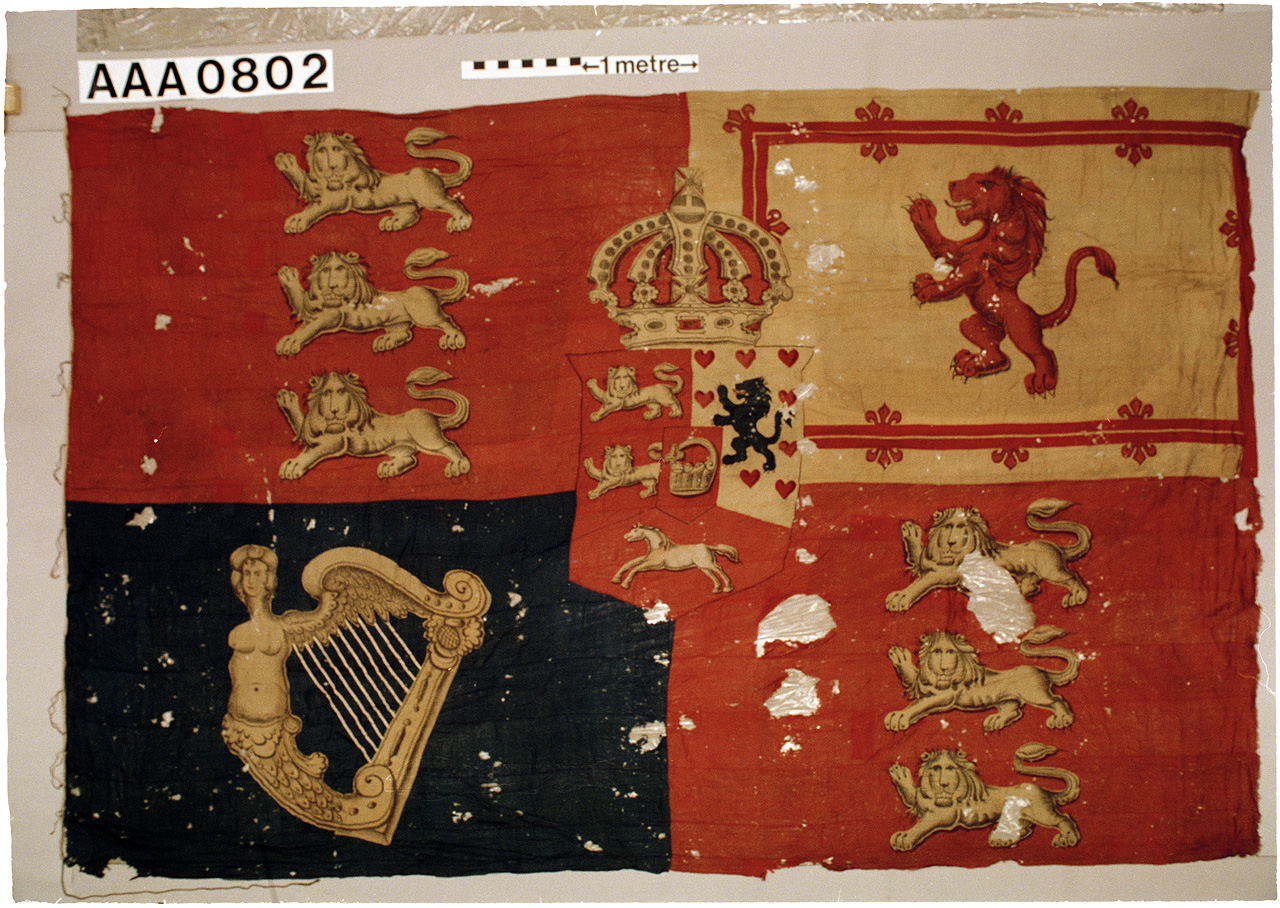
Royal standard from the Royal Museums Greenwich with the 1816–37 design

=== Others ===
Other members of the royal family may use the Royal Standard of the United Kingdom, but within an ermine border (a white border with black "tails" representing the ermine fur). This standard is mainly used for the wives of British princes, or members of the royal family who have not yet been granted their own arms. Diana, Princess of Wales, Princess Alice, Duchess of Gloucester, and Katharine, Duchess of Kent had this standard draped over their coffins at their funerals.

Camilla, Duchess of Cornwall, also enjoyed the right to use this version of the Royal Standard although she rarely exercised it on her own. She received a grant of arms on 17 July 2005, which, based on past practice, could form the basis for her own standard. Since the ascension of her husband Charles III, as queen consort she has used a new version, based on her husband's royal standard, impaled with the arms of her father, Major Bruce Shand.

Royal Standard for other members of the Royal Family who do not have a personal standard.

Royal Standard for other members of the Royal Family who do not have a personal standard, Scottish variant.

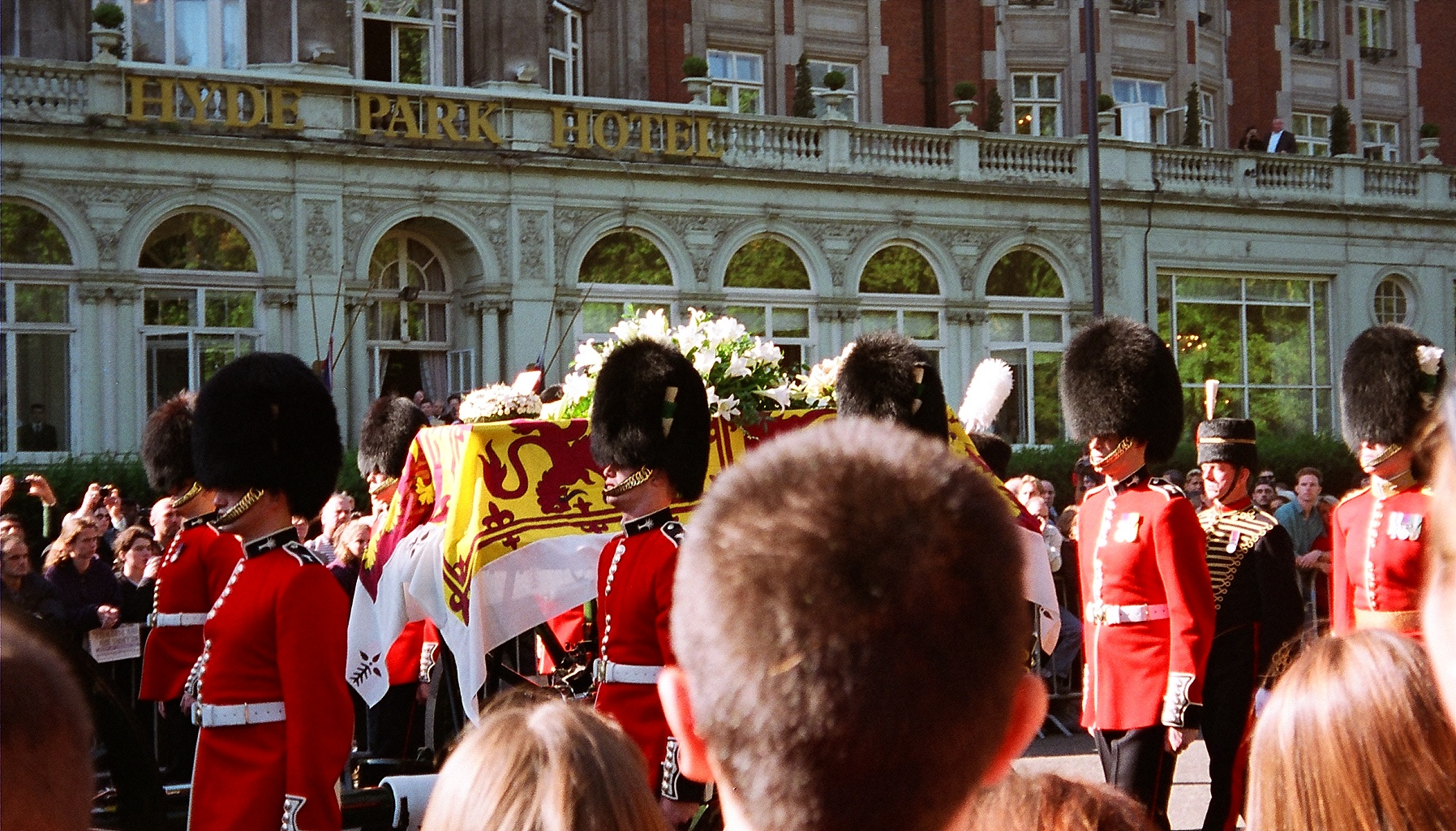
Funeral carriage of Diana, Princess of Wales, with the coffin draped with an ermine-bordered standard.

== Uses of standards ==
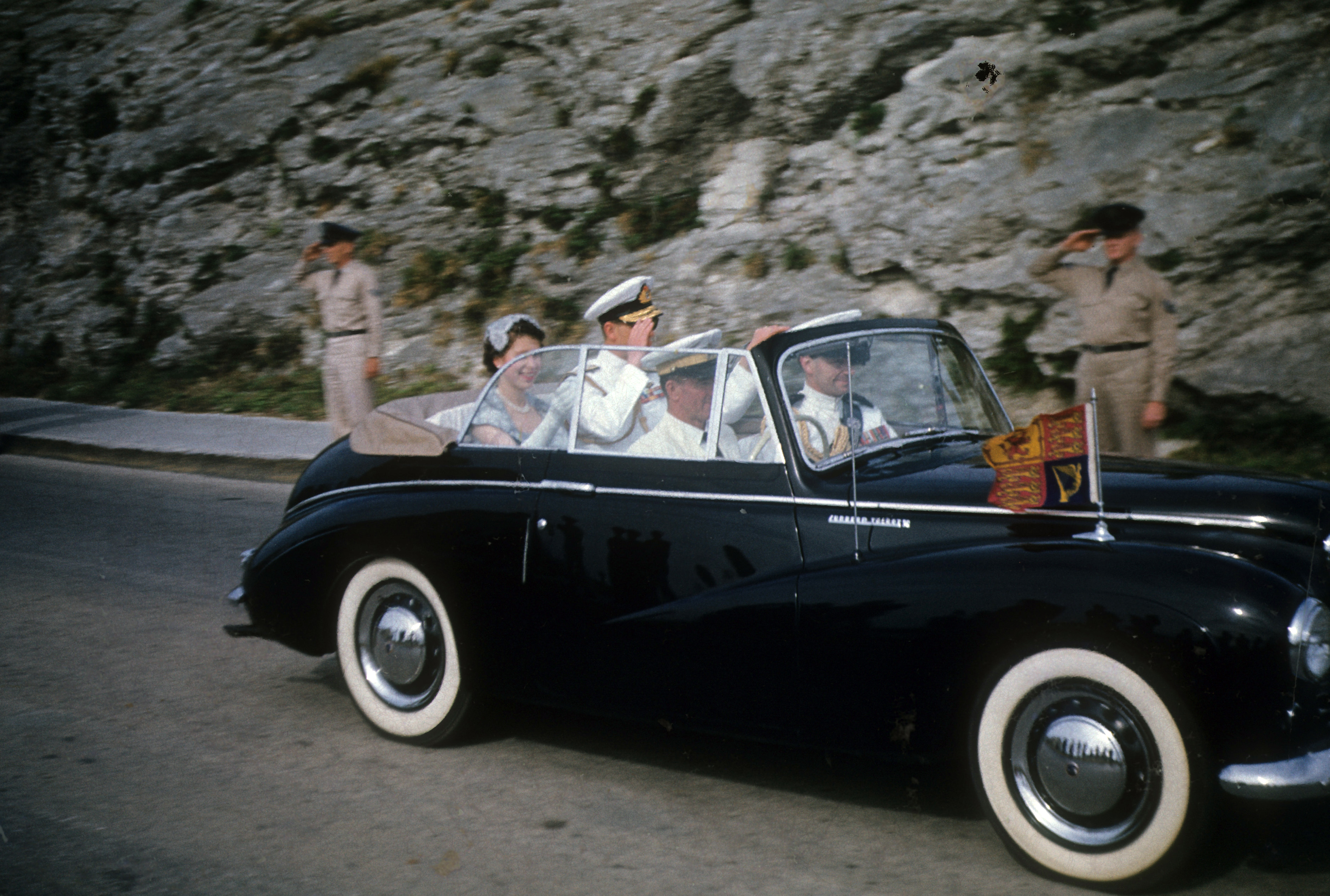
The Royal Standard affixed to Elizabeth II's car during her 1953 visit to Bermuda

The Royal Standard is reserved only for the monarch. Most famously it signals the presence of the monarch at a royal residence, and is also used on official vehicles, primarily the Bentley State Limousine, but also on other road vehicles at home or abroad, often a Land Rover Range Rover.

The Royal Standard is also flown from aircraft and water vessels, including HMY Britannia and MV Spirit of Chartwell during the Thames Diamond Jubilee Pageant. When the monarch is aboard a British naval ship, the flag is flown from the main mast of the ship and is lowered upon his/her departure. The flag is also draped over the coffin of the Monarch upon his/her death.

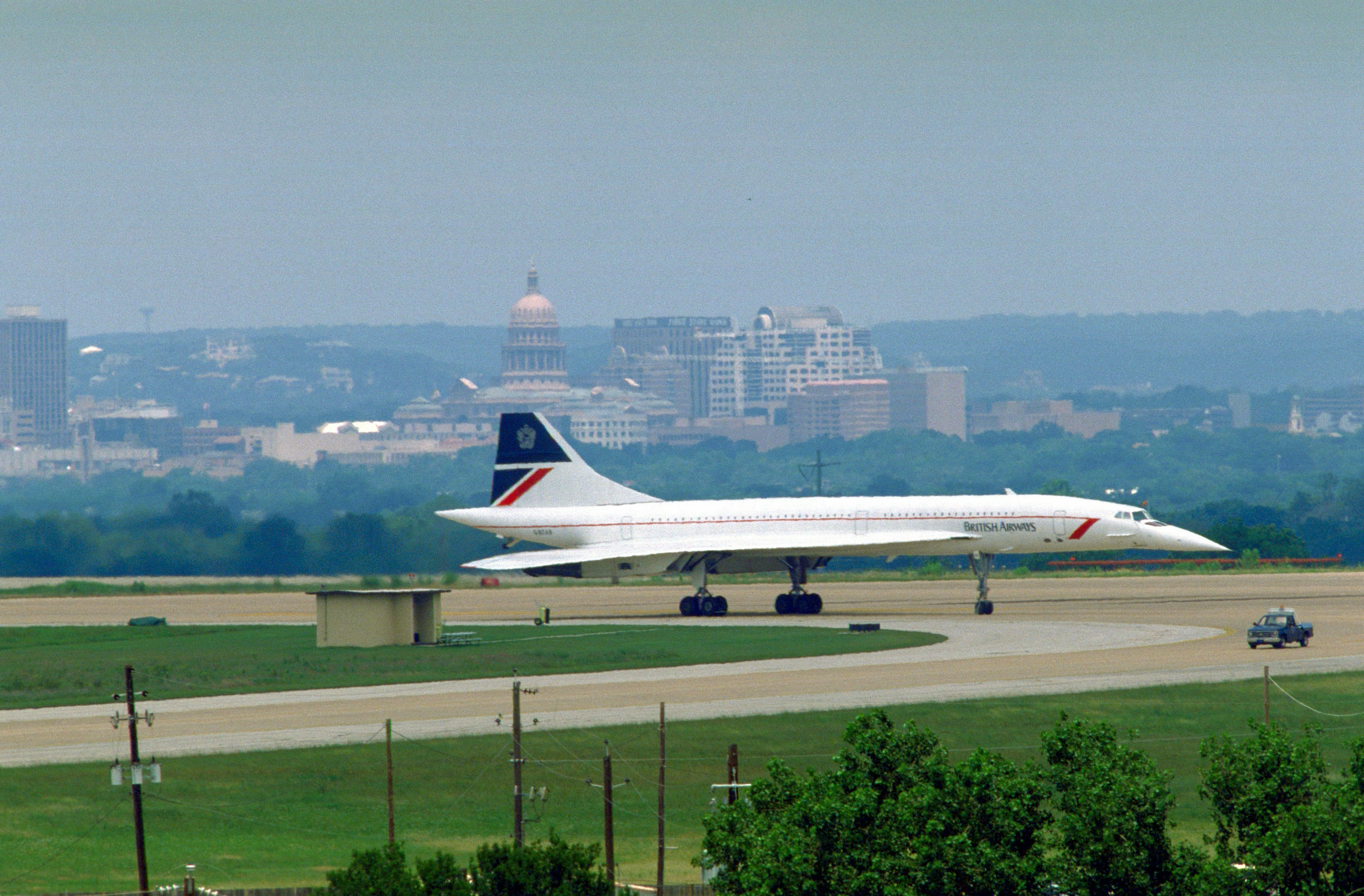
British Airways Concorde carrying Elizabeth II on the taxiway at Bergstrom Air Force Base, Austin, Texas, 20 May 1991, the Royal Standard flying from the cockpit's open port side direct-vision window.

When Edward VII acceded to the throne in 1901, he proposed that a special version of the Royal Standard (which was widely used at the time) be created for his own specific use; "a Royal Standard differenced with an oval shield in the centre carrying HM's cypher and crown on a purple ground, for the King's exclusive and personal use alone... The cypher to be changed to that of the new sovereign on the demise of the previous sovereign." However, such a proposal was considered impractical, given that the use of this alternate Standard by the King would effectively make it the new Royal Standard (despite the retention of the main version), and thus such a change would have required legislation. It was instead decided that new rules for the Royal Standard be laid down, making it so that it should not be flown anywhere other than on a royal palace, or to denote the monarch's presence.

Proposed personal Royal Standard of Edward VII

In some situations, personal standards are displayed within the UK, such as within St Giles' Cathedral, Edinburgh (site of the Chapel of the Order of the Thistle), and St George's Chapel, Windsor Castle home of Banners of Knights of the Order of the Garter, at the Thames Diamond Jubilee Pageant Prince Andrew flew his standard from MV Havengore. However, the use of personal standards of other members of the royal family varies in frequency. Prior to his accession, the Prince of Wales flew his standard at Clarence House in the same way the Royal Standard is used over Buckingham Palace, but other members of the family tend not to fly theirs from their respective residences (though this may be due to the fact that many share official London Residences, as is the case at Kensington Palace).

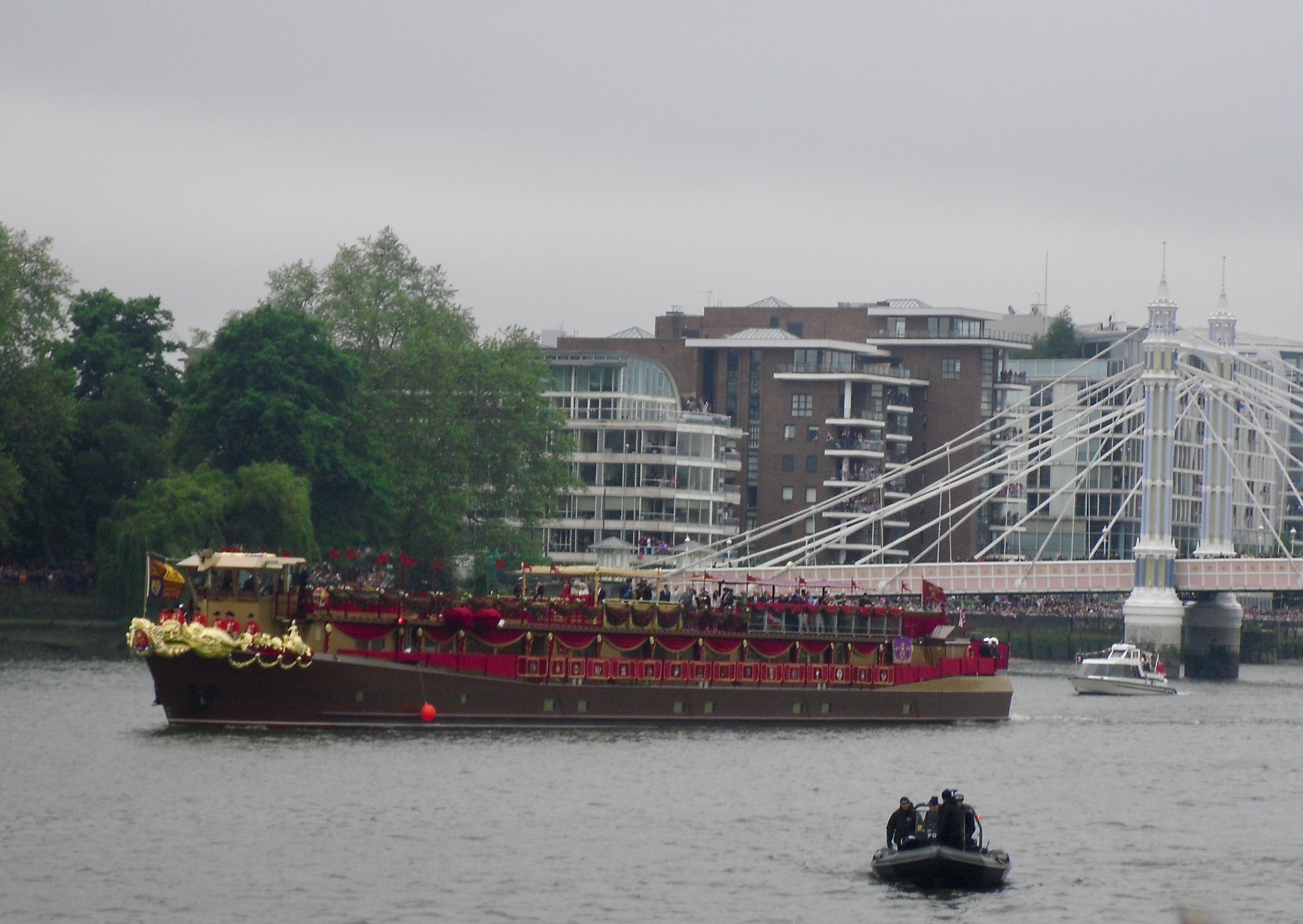
The MV Spirit of Chartwell served as a royal barge during the celebrations to mark the Diamond Jubilee of Elizabeth II; the Royal standard being flown from her bow

Family members also do not use their standards on road vehicles, either privately or during official engagements (when more discreet cars are used, such as Jaguar) or state occasions (when the Liveried cars of the Royal Mews are used), this seems reserved for the Queen only, although when Prince Philip traveled alone at state occasions, his standard flew from the roof of his car, as seen with the funerals of Diana, Princess of Wales (when the Queen Mother also flew her personal standard from her car) and that of Queen Elizabeth the Queen Mother, also, when a visiting Head of State on a state visit uses a car from the Royal Mews, his/her own flag is displayed. That said, when abroad, the standards of members of the family may well be flown: examples include Prince Charles, the Duchess of Cornwall and Prince William.

Personal Standards have been used to cover the coffins of the Queen Mother, the Prince Philip, Duke of Edinburgh, Princess Margaret and the Duke of Windsor.

=== Position of honour ===
According to the Flag Institute, the basic order of precedence for flags in the United Kingdom is – the Royal Standard, the Union Flag, the flag of the country, dependency or Overseas Territory of the United Kingdom (England, Scotland, Wales, etc.), other country, dependency or overseas territory flags of the United Kingdom, flags of other nations (in English alphabetical order), the Commonwealth flag, the flag of Europe, county flags, flags of cities and towns, banners of arms (personal and corporate), and house flags.

== See also ==
- Order of the Garter § Chapel
- Flags of the English Interregnum
- Flags of Elizabeth II
- Royal flags of Canada
- Heraldic flag
