= MV Spirit of Chartwell =

Hotel barge

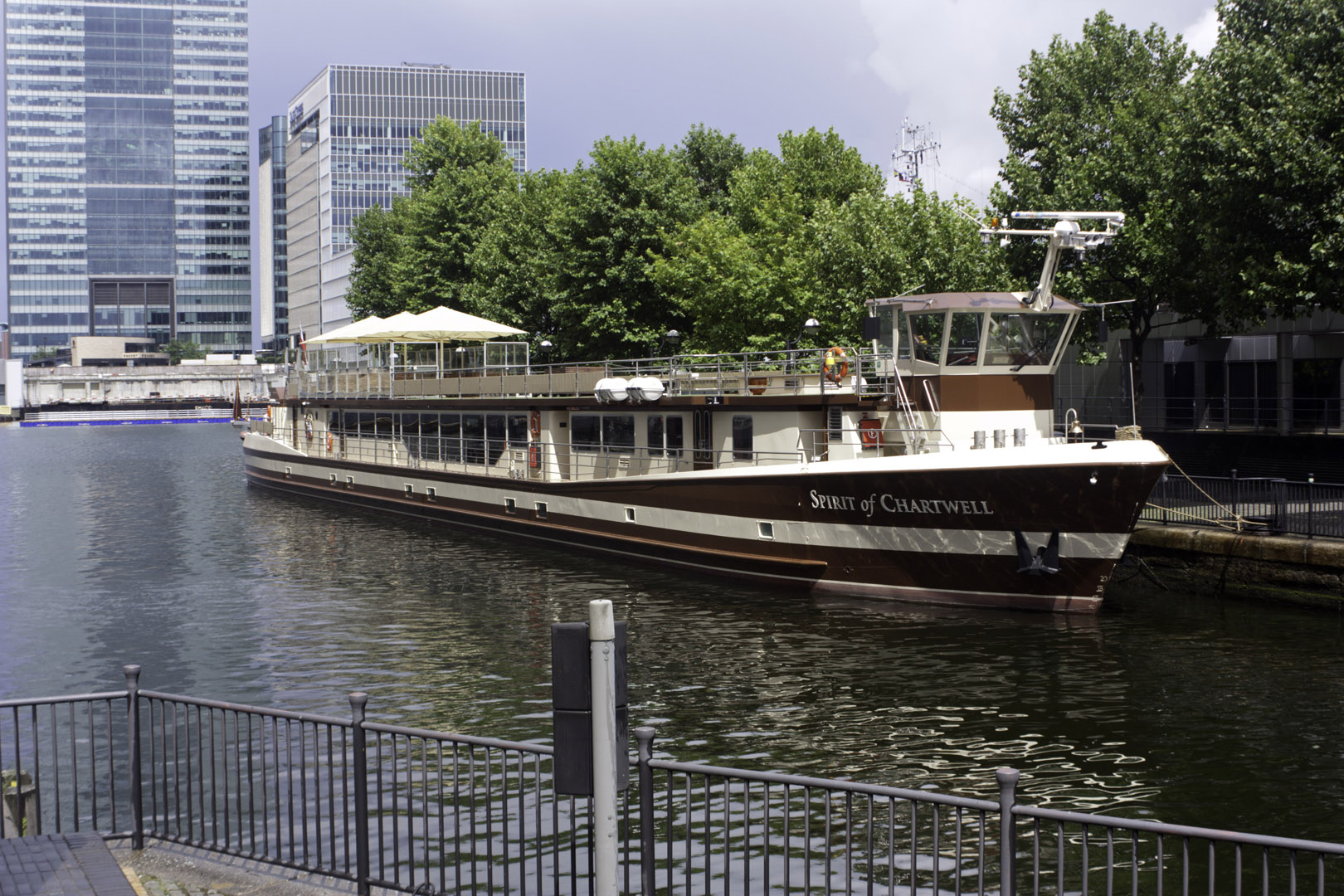

History

Portugal
- Name: Spirit of Chartwell
- Owner: Mário Ferreira (Douro Azul)
- Operator: Douro Azul S.A.
- Route: Douro
- Builder: Grave B.V. Grave Netherlands
- Acquired: 2012
- Status: In active service

United Kingdom
- Name: Spirit of Chartwell
- Owner: Philip Morrell
- Operator: Magna Carta Steamship Company
- Port of registry: London, UK
- Route: River Thames
- Acquired: 2010
- Identification: Call sign: 2CSE7; IMO number: 8739384; MMSI number: 235078225; ENI number: 07001842
- Fate: Sold
- Notes: Royal barge

Netherlands
- Name: Vincent van Gogh
- Namesake: Vincent van Gogh
- Operator: Kooiman Group
- Route: Rhine
- Builder: Grave B.V. Grave Netherlands
- Maiden voyage: 1997
- Fate: Sold

General characteristics
- Class & type: Luxury Commercial passenger vessel
- Tonnage: 485 GT
- Length: 63.87 m (210 ft)
- Beam: 6.72 m (22 ft)
- Height: 3.8 m (12 ft)
- Draught: 1.66 m (5 ft 5 in)
- Installed power: DAF 2 × 350 hp
- Propulsion: Twin ZF Marine (formally known as HRP)
- Speed: 11 knots
- Notes: Two bow thrusters

MV Spirit of Chartwell is a hotel barge owned and operated by Portuguese holiday company Douro Azul for luxury cruises along the Douro river, Porto, Portugal.

Previously owned and operated by the Magna Carta Steamship Company for luxury cruises along the River Thames, she was selected in late 2011 to be the royal barge as part of Queen Elizabeth II's Diamond Jubilee celebrations, and carried the Queen and Prince Philip, Duke of Edinburgh in a flotilla of more than 1,000 vessels during the Thames Diamond Jubilee Pageant on 3 June 2012. The ship was sold in June 2012 to Douro Azul to operate luxury cruises in the Douro river.

She was designed in the style of the Côte d'Azur Pullman Express deluxe train and carries artefacts from the original train and ocean liners such as RMS Kenya Castle, SS France and RMS Windsor Castle.

== Former use and refit ==
The ship was formerly a Rhine ship known as Vincent van Gogh. She was refitted as a luxury Thames cruise vessel by the Dutch Kooiman Group in 2009/2010.

== Thames Diamond Jubilee Pageant ==
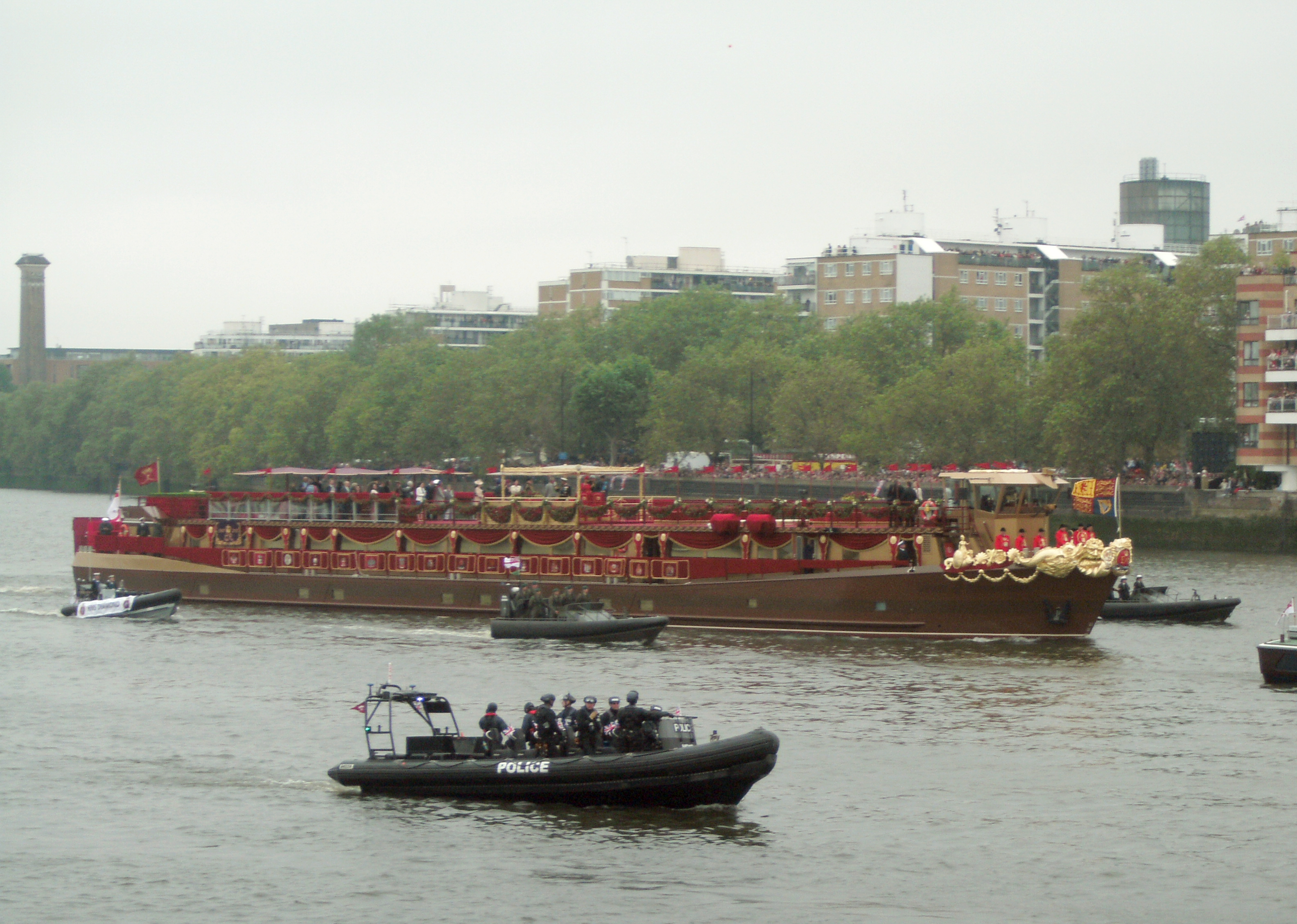
Decorated for the Thames Diamond Jubilee Pageant

For the Thames Diamond Jubilee Pageant in 2012 the vessel was lavishly decorated in red, gold and purple, reminiscent of royal barges of the 17th and 18th centuries. Among the additions were thousands of flowers, an ornate gilded prow sculpture of Old Father Thames carved and moulded in jesmonite, symbols of royalty, and a large red velvet banner with a royal coat of arms made of more than half a million gold-coloured buttons.

A special warrant was issued by the Secretary of State for Defence to permit Spirit of Chartwell to wear the White Ensign whilst serving as the Royal Barge on 3 June 2012. When the Queen was on board, she also flew the Royal Standard of the United Kingdom from the bow.

== See also ==
- List of river cruise ships
