= Whitechapel Bell Foundry =

Defunct bell foundry in London, England

Coordinates: 51°31′1″N 0°4′2″W

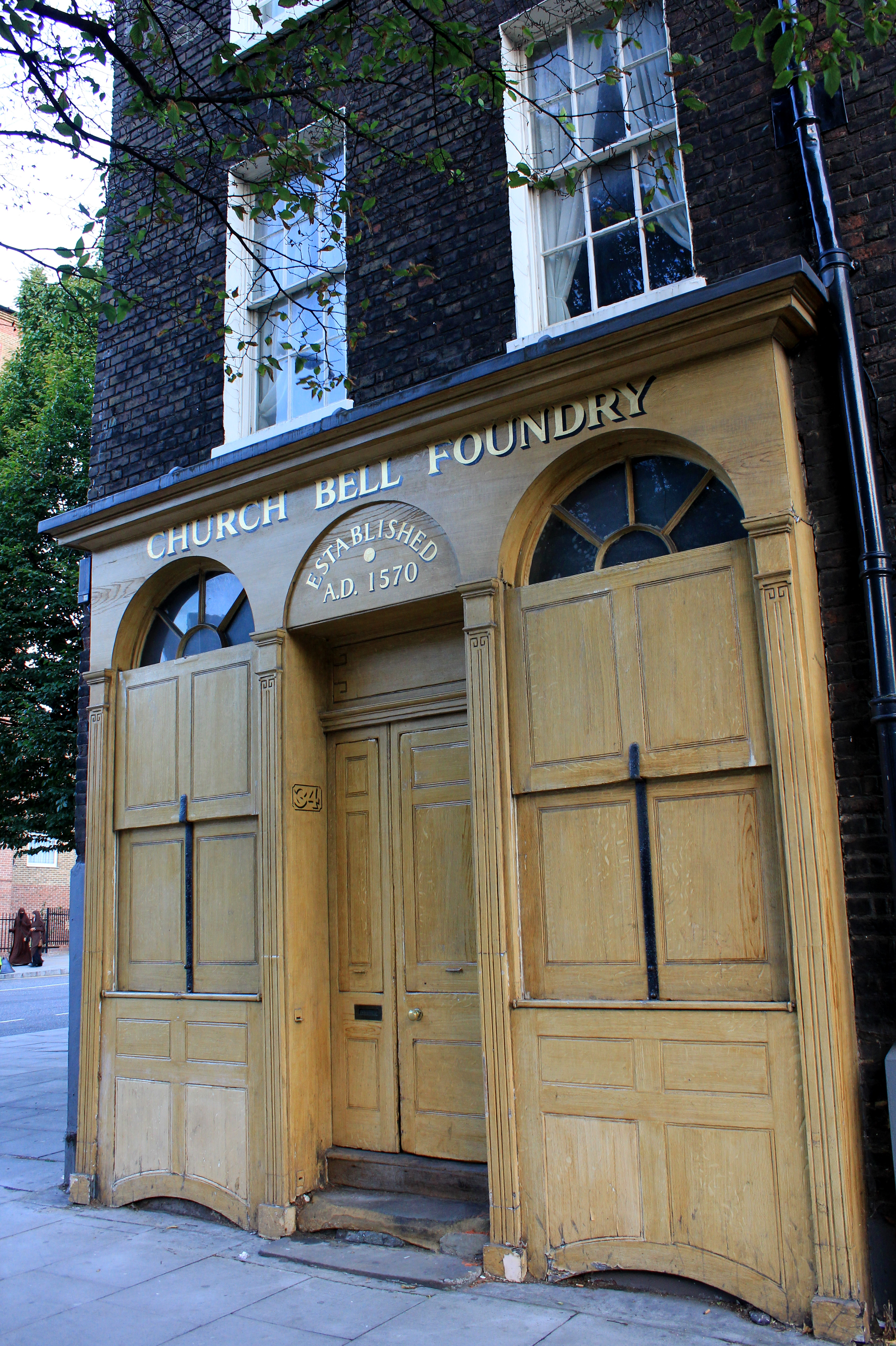
Street entrance to Whitechapel Bell Foundry in London

The Whitechapel Bell Foundry was a business in the London Borough of Tower Hamlets. At the time of the closure of its Whitechapel premises, it was the oldest manufacturing company in Great Britain.

The bell foundry primarily made church bells and their fittings and accessories, although it also provided single tolling bells, carillon bells and handbells. The foundry was notable for being the original manufacturer of the Liberty Bell, a famous symbol of American independence, and for re-casting Big Ben, which rings from the north clock tower (the Elizabeth Tower) at the Houses of Parliament in London.

The Whitechapel premises are a Grade II* listed building. The foundry closed on 12 June 2017, after nearly 450 years of bell-making and 250 years at its Whitechapel site, with the final bell cast given to the Museum of London along with other artefacts used in the manufacturing process, and the building has been sold.

Following the sale of the Whitechapel Bell Foundry, the bell patents were sold to the bell-hanging company Whites of Appleton in Oxfordshire, with which the foundry had a business relationship for 197 years. The rights to tower bell production are now under the ownership of Westley Group Ltd. Production of presentation and hand bells continues under the name Bells of Whitechapel Ltd.

== History ==
The bell founding industry around Aldgate and Whitechapel can be traced back to at least 1360, and a few years later, Geoffrey Chaucer, living in a room in the Aldgate itself, described the presence of a bell founding industry in the area. The Master Founders (bell makers) of Aldgate and Whitechapel, can be traced back to 1420.

The Whitechapel Bell Foundry company began in 1570. The last premises at 32–34 Whitechapel Road, backing on to Plumbers Row, dates from 1670 and was formerly a coaching inn called "The Artichoke" which had been damaged in the Great Fire of London. The Artichoke ceased trading in 1738 and the following year the Whitechapel Bell Foundry moved into the premises. The foundry remained at the site until May 2017. It was one of only two bell foundries left in the UK and had been in continuous production for almost 450 years.

The three bells manufacturer's mark can be seen on the bells and the three bells sign hung over the door of the Whitechapel site. According to previous owners Alan and Kathryn Hughes, the foundry had been a family-owned company throughout its history continuing when Alan Hughes's grandfather bought the company in 1904, until its sale to Westley group in 2017.

The business had to adapt throughout the centuries and in modern times, with new churches being built less frequently, produced handbells and doorbells. It responded to a surge in orders for table bells, following the popularity of the ITV period drama Downton Abbey, with a third of its sales going overseas. In 2013 the foundry launched an online shop selling house bells, musical instruments and personalised merchandise. The large bell business has been largely unaffected by periods of financial depression, partly because from enquiry to completion an order takes on average 11 years. During World War II the foundry was used as a munitions production line, making casings for the War Office.

The government not only guaranteed the orders. They guaranteed good prices and they also guaranteed quick payment, which is something that the Church of England has never managed to do with us.

— Alan Hughes

The foundry was particularly busy after the war, replacing bells lost or damaged by fire in bombing raids across London. Hughes said "Our business runs counter to the national economy. If the economy goes down and unemployment rises, we start to get busy. Last year was our busiest in thirty years, an increase of 27% on the previous year. Similarly, the nineteen twenties were very busy." Hughes also tells a story of an order requested of his grandfather in the 1890s which his father quoted again for in the 1950s and he himself gave a quote for in the 1970s. The order was finally completed in 1998.

In March 2017 a consortium of heritage groups, including Save Britain's Heritage, the East End Preservation Society, the Society for the Protection of Ancient Buildings, the Ancient Monuments Society and the Royal Academy of Arts attempted to have the foundry's Grade II* premises re-listed as a Grade I listed building as an asset of community value to preserve the historical importance of the building within the wider east end community.

The foundry was sold to US investor Raycliff who proposed their intention to convert the site into a 100 to 108 room hotel at the rear of the building with a bell themed cafe while maintaining space for the production of smaller bells including hand bells. Raycliff hired local architectural practice 31/44 for the design. The plan has the support of Historic England, described by one journalist as “a public body which gives paid advice to property developers to encourage them to get through the existing planning systems.” The application has been controversial. The application was called in by the government on 22 January 2020, preventing the London Borough of Tower Hamlets from proceeding with the planning application pending the outcome of further public inquiry. Following a public inquiry a planning inspector recommended consent to the Secretary of State who issued a consent with conditions. The London Bell Foundry, a not for profit company dedicated to saving the historic foundry as a working enterprise, made an offer to purchase the site in November 2022.

Whitechapel Bell Foundry - Bells cast by Mears & Stainbank for All Saints, Rothbury, Northumberland, c. 1893<ref&amp;gt;"Rothbury". Bells of the North-East of England.</ref&amp;gt;

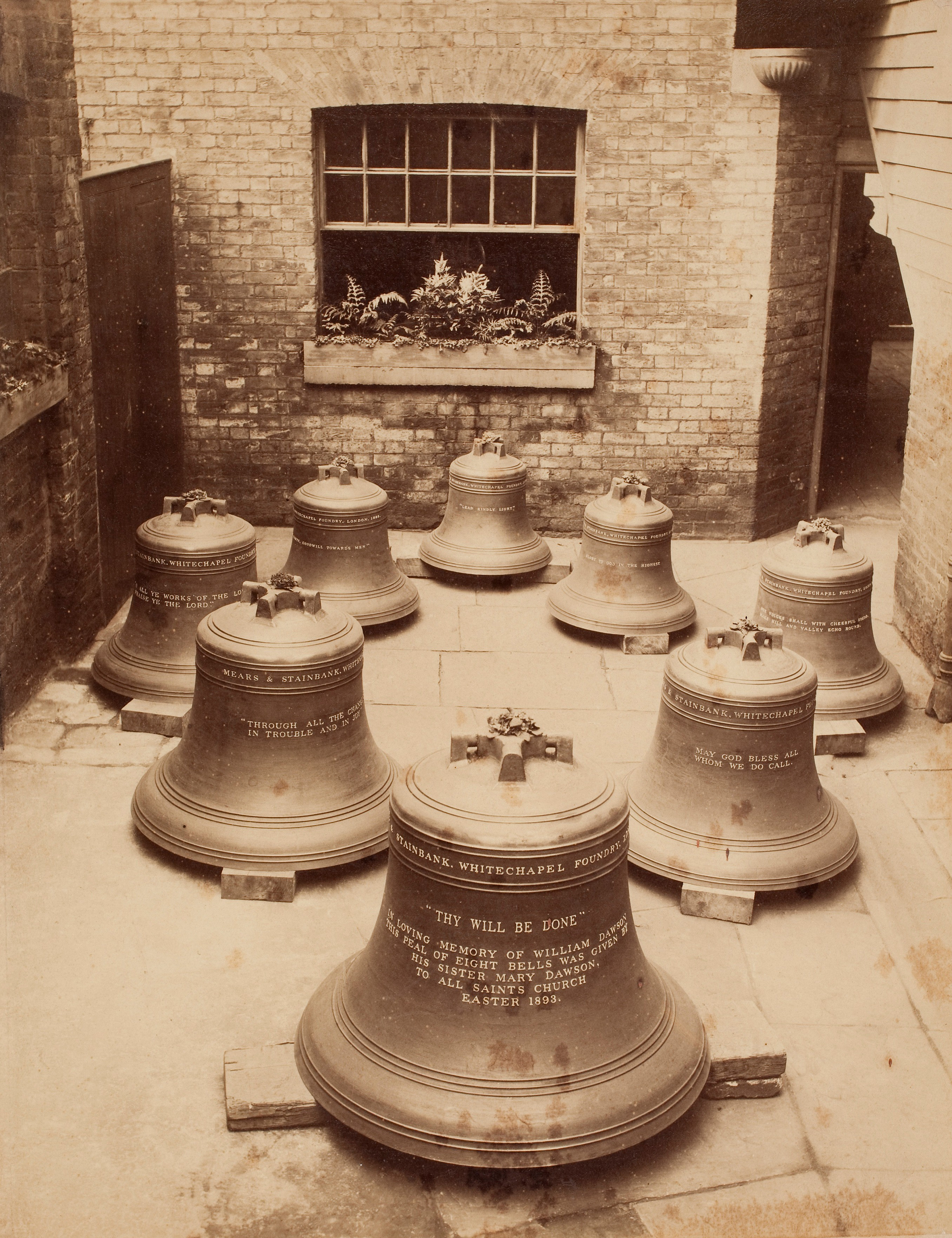
Cast Bells by Whitechapel Bell Foundry, 1893 State Library of New South Wales

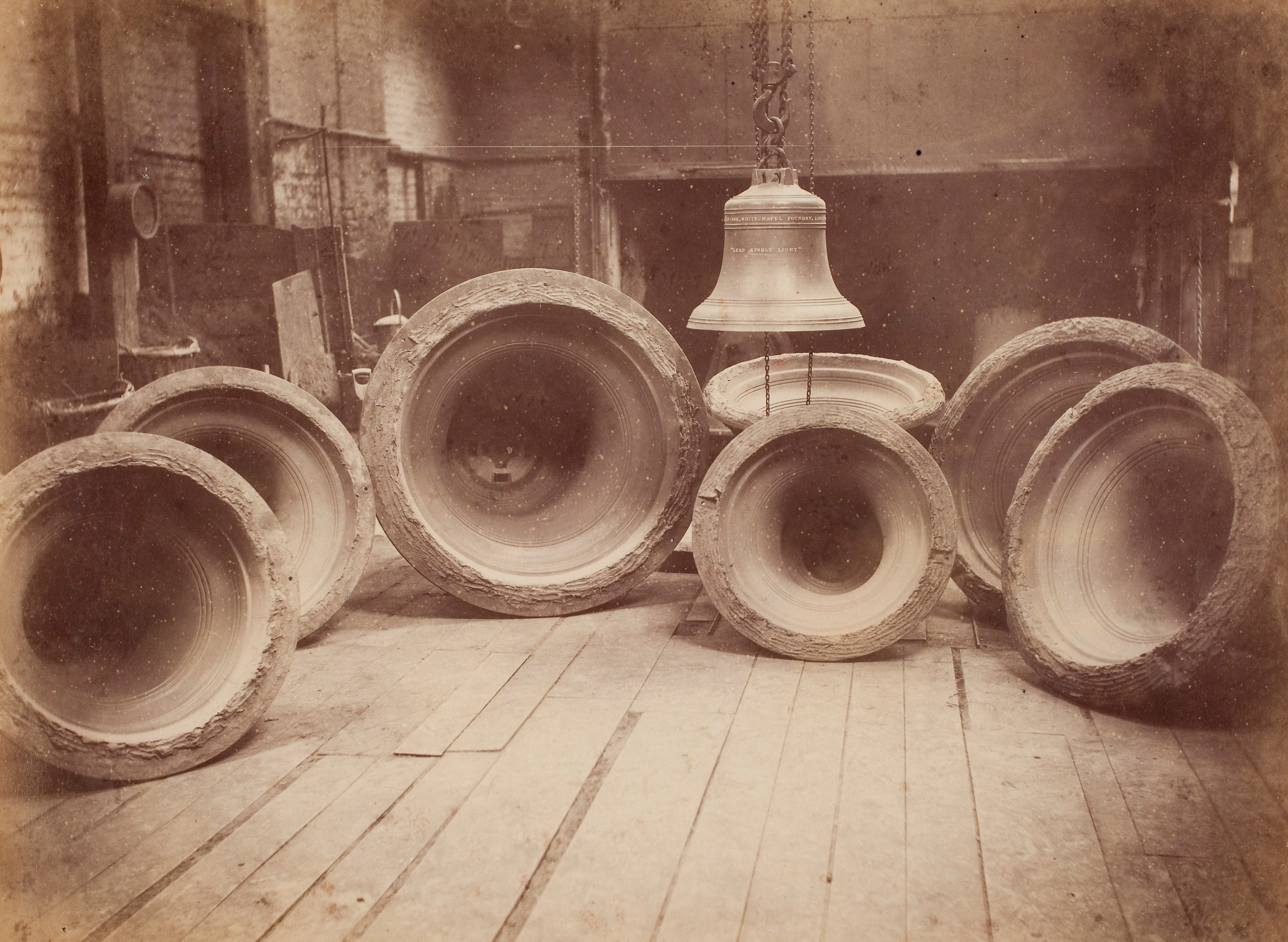
Church Bells in the workshop at Whitechapel Bell Foundry, 1893

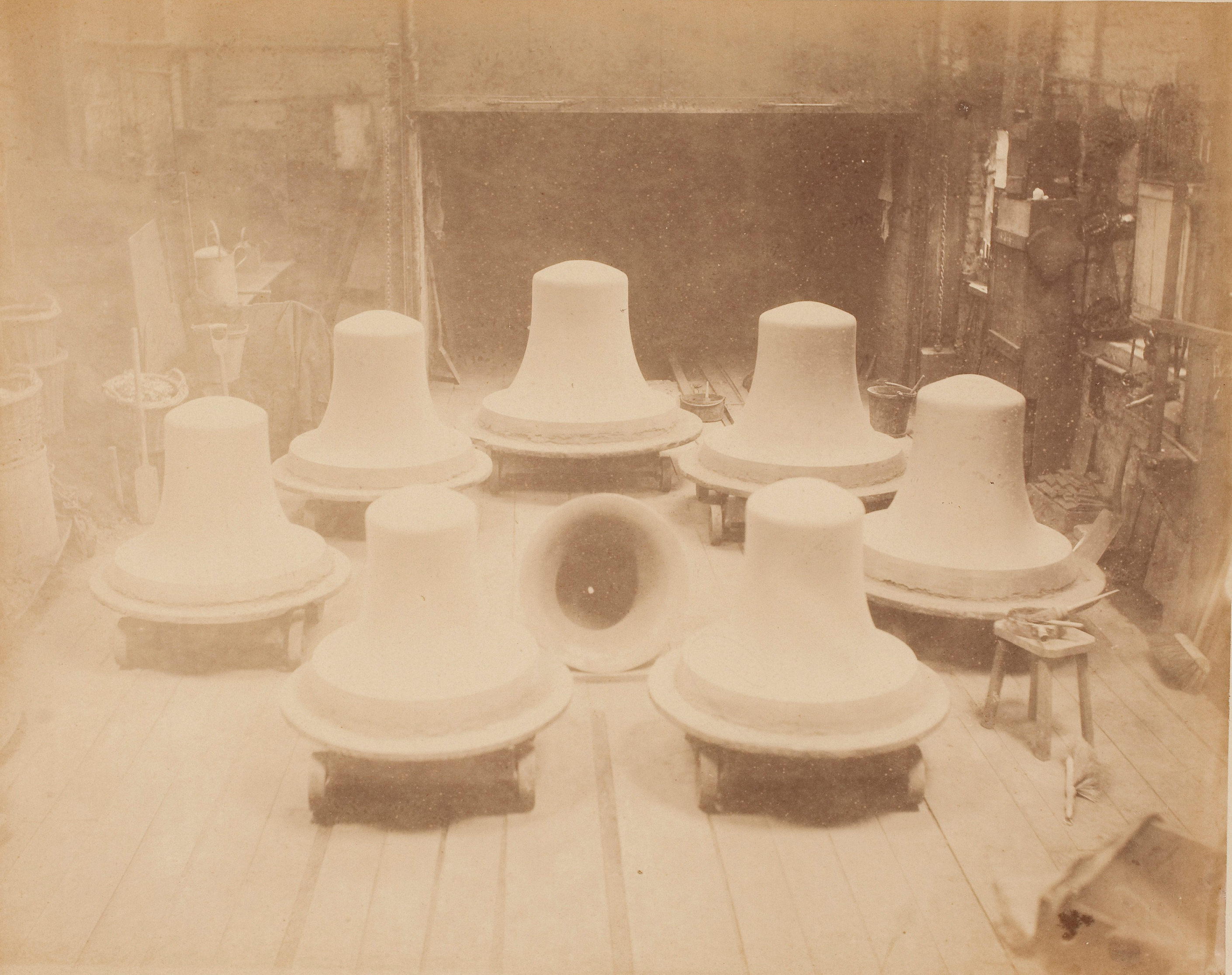
Moulds for church bells in the workshop at Whitechapel Bell Foundry

== Notable bells ==
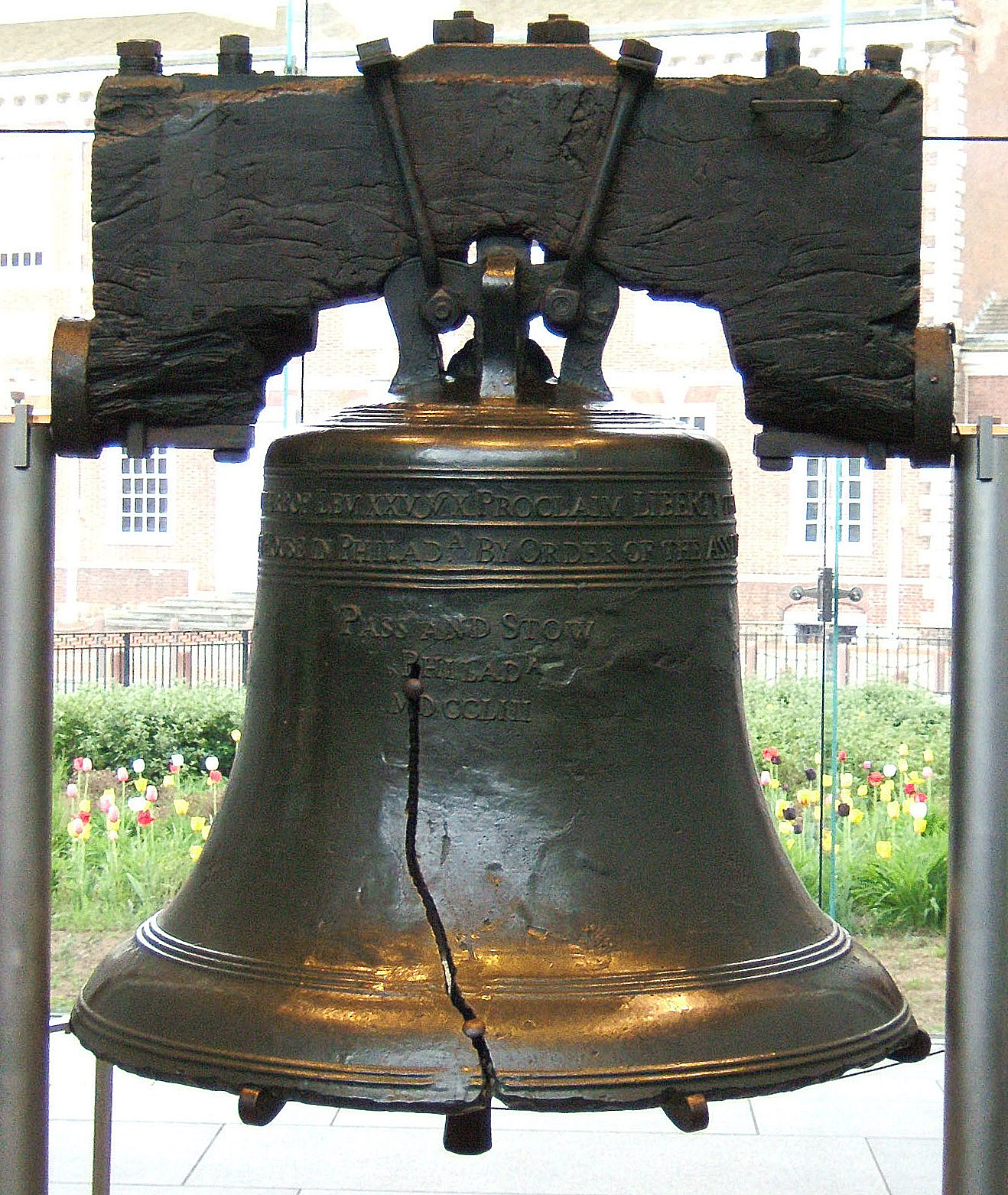
The Liberty Bell in Philadelphia

Many churches across the world have bells cast by the Whitechapel Bell Foundry, but arguably its two best-known examples are not in places of worship. In 1752 the foundry (known at the time as Lester and Pack) cast the Liberty Bell, which was commissioned to celebrate the 50th anniversary of William Penn's 1701 Charter of Privileges, Pennsylvania's original constitution. As a result of damage sustained during its stormy passage across the Atlantic, the bell cracked when it was first rung, and after repeated repairs cracked again.

Big Ben, which tolls the hour at the Palace of Westminster, was cast in 1858 and rung for the first time on 31 May 1859. "Big Ben" weighs 13½ tons and is the largest bell ever cast at the foundry. This bell also cracked because too heavy a hammer was initially used. The crack and the subsequent retuning gives Big Ben its present distinctive tone. A profile template of Big Ben surrounds the entrance door of the Whitechapel Foundry, while the original moulding gauge is retained near the furnaces. The final bill for Big Ben came to £572.

Whitechapel has supplied bells to several cathedrals. Guildford Cathedral in Surrey had a peal of 10 bells (later augmented to 12), Canterbury Cathedral augmented its bells to a peal of 14 in 1981, and the National Cathedral in Washington, D.C. in 1962. The foundry produced "Great Tom" at Lincoln Cathedral, the "Clock Bells" at St Paul's Cathedral, the bells of Westminster Abbey Upon the construction of its tower between 1924 and 1942, the foundry cast 14 bells for the Liverpool Cathedral which all include psalm texts engravings. The bells are notable for being the heaviest change ringing peal of bells in the world. The foundry's bellfounder at that time, Albert Hughes, is commemorated in a stained glass window in the nave.

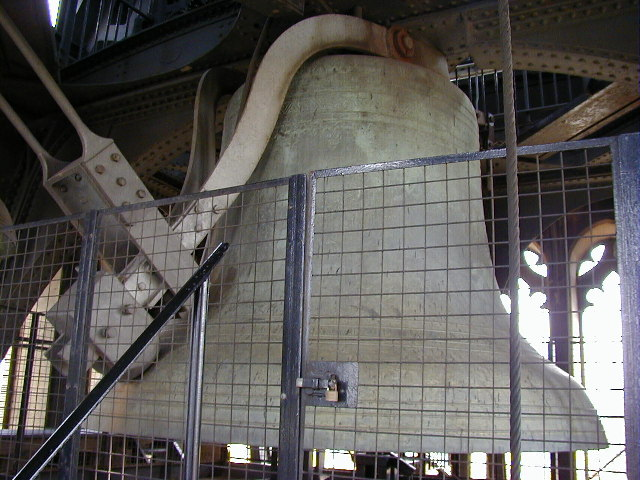
Big Ben in Westminster has the best-known chime in the world.

Churches with bells from Whitechapel include ones as near as St Mary-le-Bow, Cheapside and as far as the Armenian Church, Chennai, India. English examples include St Dunstan's, Stepney and St Dunstan's, Mayfield; St Michael's, Beckwithshaw; St Mary-le-More, Wallingford Church of St Thomas the Apostle, Killinghall; and St Michael and All Angels, Leaden Roding. American churches in the Anglican Communion, for example St. Michael's Church, in Charleston, South Carolina. Australian churches include St Bartholomew's Church, Burnley, St Stephen's Anglican Church, Newtown; St Philip's Church and St James' Church, Sydney. In Canada, the towers of Notre-Dame Basilica in Montreal house one of the world's largest bells and a ten-bell carillon.

Bells not in churches include civic focal points such as a clock tower; Thomas Mears II cast the bell for Herne Bay Clock Tower in 1837. The Old Post Office in Washington, D.C., USA, has a ring of 10 bells in the key of D (tenor 26 cwt) that were cast by the Whitechapel Foundry in 1976, installed in 1982, and dedicated in 1983. The bells range in weight from 581 to 2953 pounds. These bells, referred to as The Congress Bells, were a gift to the US Congress from Britain's Ditchley Foundation to celebrate the bicentennial of American independence.

The sterling silver bell silver ships bell on post WW II HMS Ark Royals (4 - 1955) and (5 - 1985) is said (by Taylor's of Loughborough) to have been cast by Whitechapel Foundry.

Following the September 11 attacks on the United States in 2001, the company made a tribute bell, the Bell of Hope, as a gift from the people of London to the city of New York. It is rung at 08:46 each year on the anniversary of the tragedy, the time the first plane hit the first tower. It was designed by architect Paul Byard and was rung for the first time on American soil by the Bishop of New York, the Rt. Rev. Mark S. Sisk. The bell resided at Trinity Church (Manhattan), before being moved to St. Paul's Chapel. In 2005 it was rung again four times for the people killed in the 7 July 2005 London bombings.

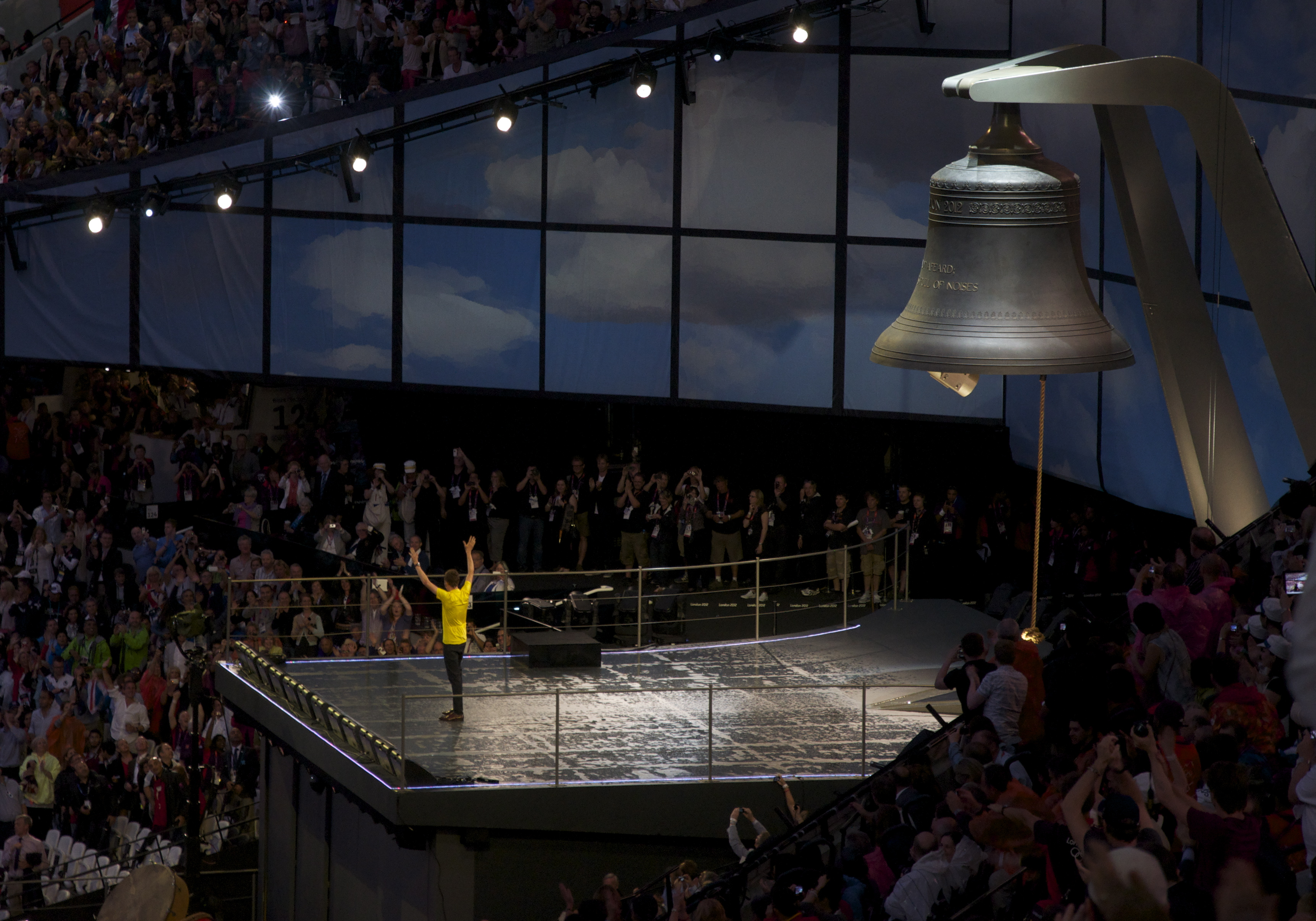
Bradley Wiggins began the 2012 London Olympics opening ceremony by ringing the Olympic Bell.

The Whitechapel Bell Foundry designed the Olympic Bell seen at the opening ceremony for the London 2012 Olympic Games, although it was not cast on the premises. The furnaces at Whitechapel could not provide the 23 tons of molten metal required to make the bell, so it was manufactured at a factory in the Netherlands which normally produces ship's propellers.

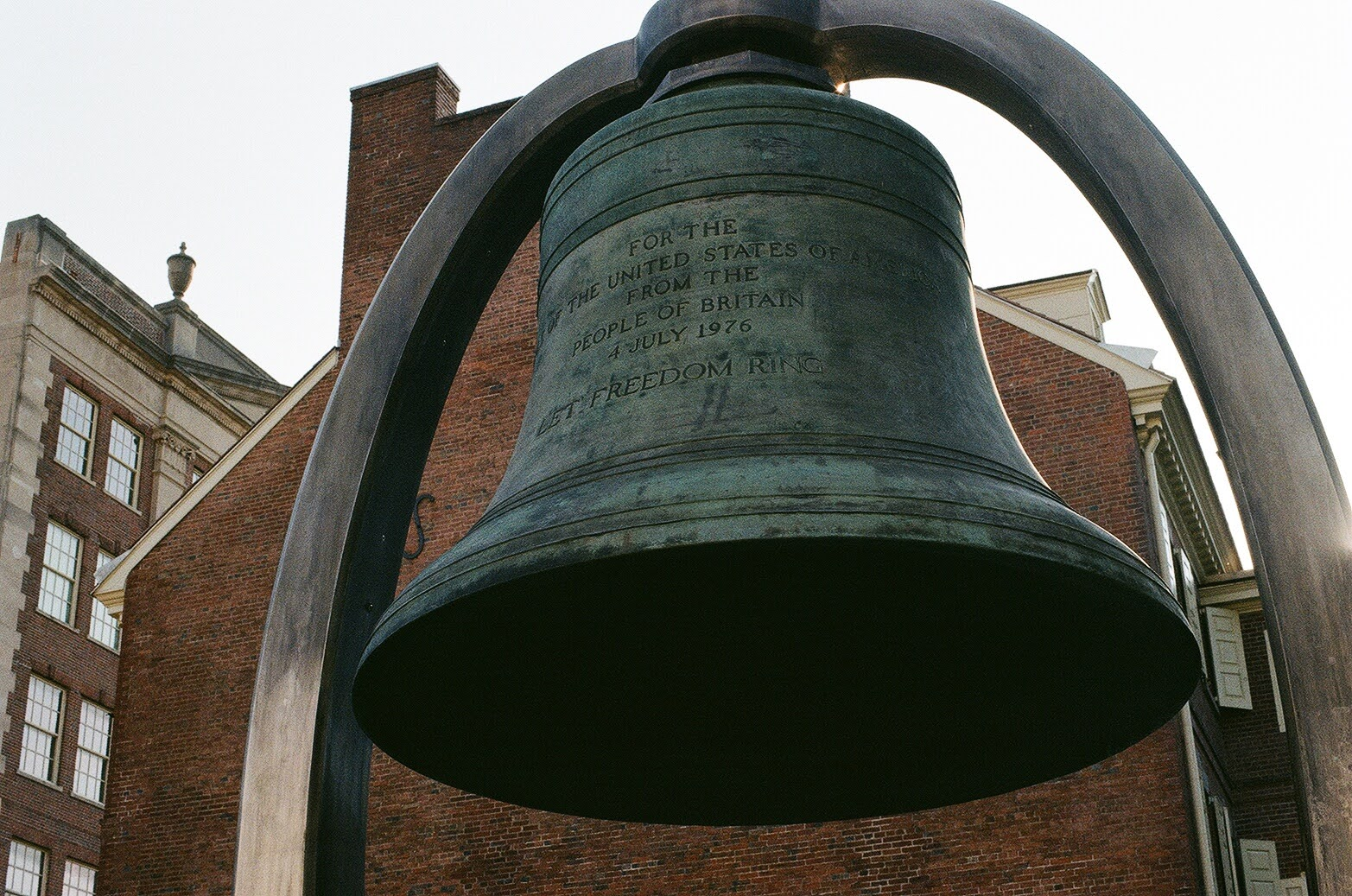
The Bicentennial Bell as it is currently located in 2025, in Benjamin Rush Garden in Phliadelphia

The Olympic Bell is the largest harmonically tuned bell in the world and the widest bell in Britain. It now hangs in the Queen Elizabeth Olympic Park, but is not rung because it is deemed too loud to be rung without disturbing local residents.

The Foundry cast the Royal Jubilee Bells used on the lead barge for the Thames Diamond Jubilee Pageant the same summer, which now hang in the church of St James Garlickhythe.

Damon Albarn had three bells cast from the foundry for "On Melancholy Hill" for the Gorillaz album Plastic Beach, although they were not used on the final song. These were cast in the notes D, A and C-sharp. However one of the bells is often used on live versions of "We Got the Power".

The last bell to be cast at the foundry was on 22 March 2017, and was given to the Museum of London along with historical artefacts from the premises. The manufacturing patents for the Whitechapel bells have been sold to the bell-hanging company, Whites of Appleton in Oxfordshire, with whom the foundry has had a business relationship for 197 years.

== Master founders ==
The names on this list are those that are cast into the surface of Whitechapel bells of different dates. Prior to Robert Mot, in 1574, the sign of three bells was often cast to indicate that it was a Whitechapel (or Aldgate) bell.

- 1420 Robert Chamberlain of Aldgate
- 1426 William Chamberlain
- 1456 John Daniel
- 1470 John Daniel's Successor
- 1487 IW
- 1500–1515 Thomas Bullisdon
- 1506–1522 William Culverden
- 1523 Thomas Lawrence
- 1538 John Owen
- 1553 Thomas Kempe
- 1574 Robert Mot
- 1606 Joseph Carter
- 1610 William Carter
- 1616 Thomas Bartlet
- 1632 John Clifton
- 1640 Anthony Bartlet
- 1675 James Bartlet
- 1700 Richard Phelps
- 1735 Phelps and Lester
- 1738 Thomas Lester
- 1752 Lester and Pack
- 1769 Lester, Pack and Chapman
- 1769 Pack and Chapman
- 1781 Chapman and Mears
- 1784 William Mears
- 1787 William and Thomas Mears
- 1791 Thomas Mears I
- 1805 Mears and Son
- 1810 Thomas Mears II
- 1844 Charles and George Mears
- 1861 George Mears and Co
- 1865 Mears and Stainbank
- 1873 Robert Stainbank
- 1884 Alfred Lawson
- 1904 Arthur Hughes
- 1916 Albert Hughes
- 1945 Albert and William Hughes
- 1950 Albert, William and Douglas Hughes
- 1964 William and Douglas Hughes
- 1972 William, Douglas and Alan Hughes
- 1993 Douglas and Alan Hughes
- 1997 Alan and Kathryn Hughes

== Gallery ==
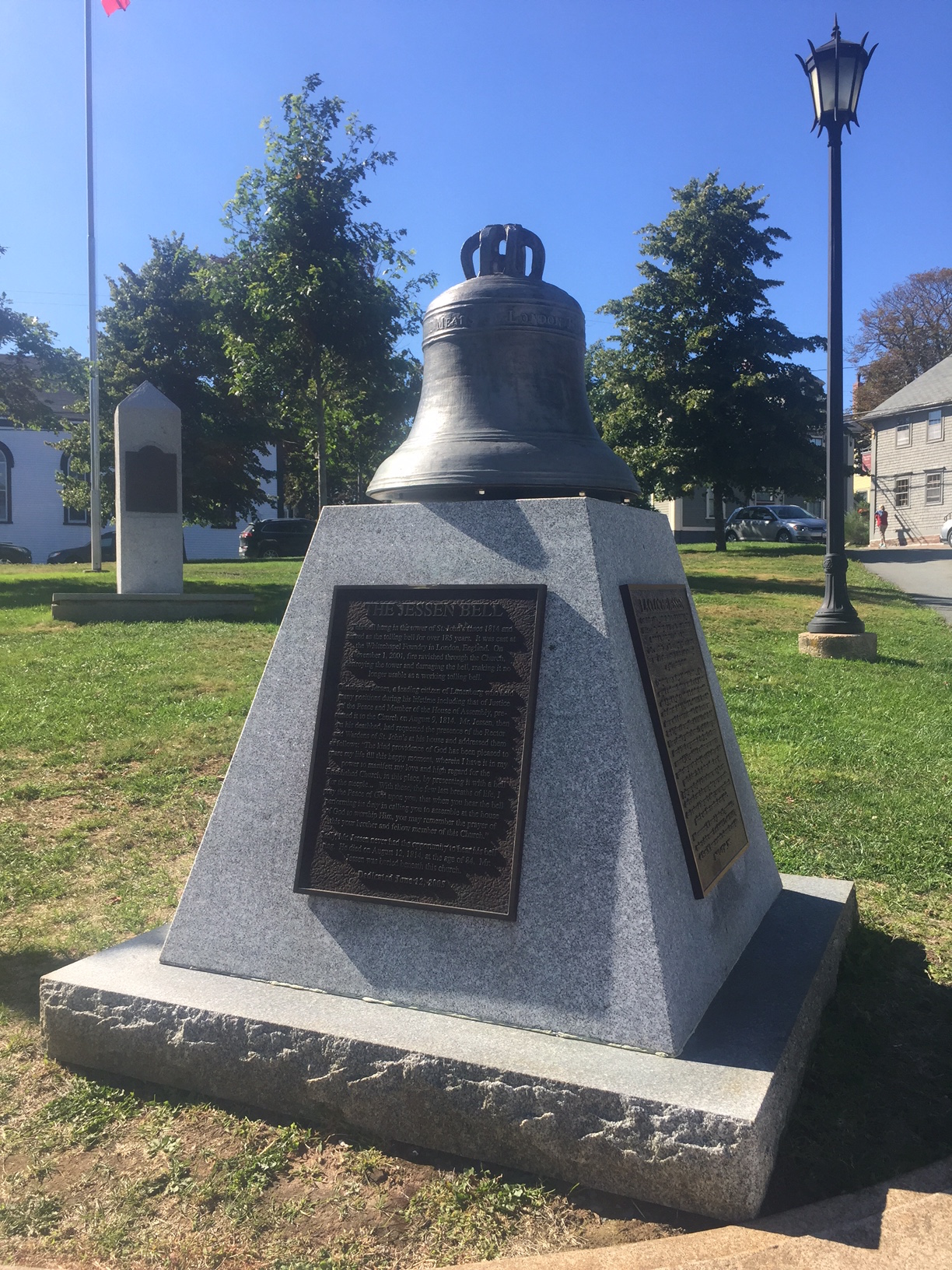
The Jessen Bell (1814), St. John's Anglican Church (Lunenburg), Nova Scotia, Canada

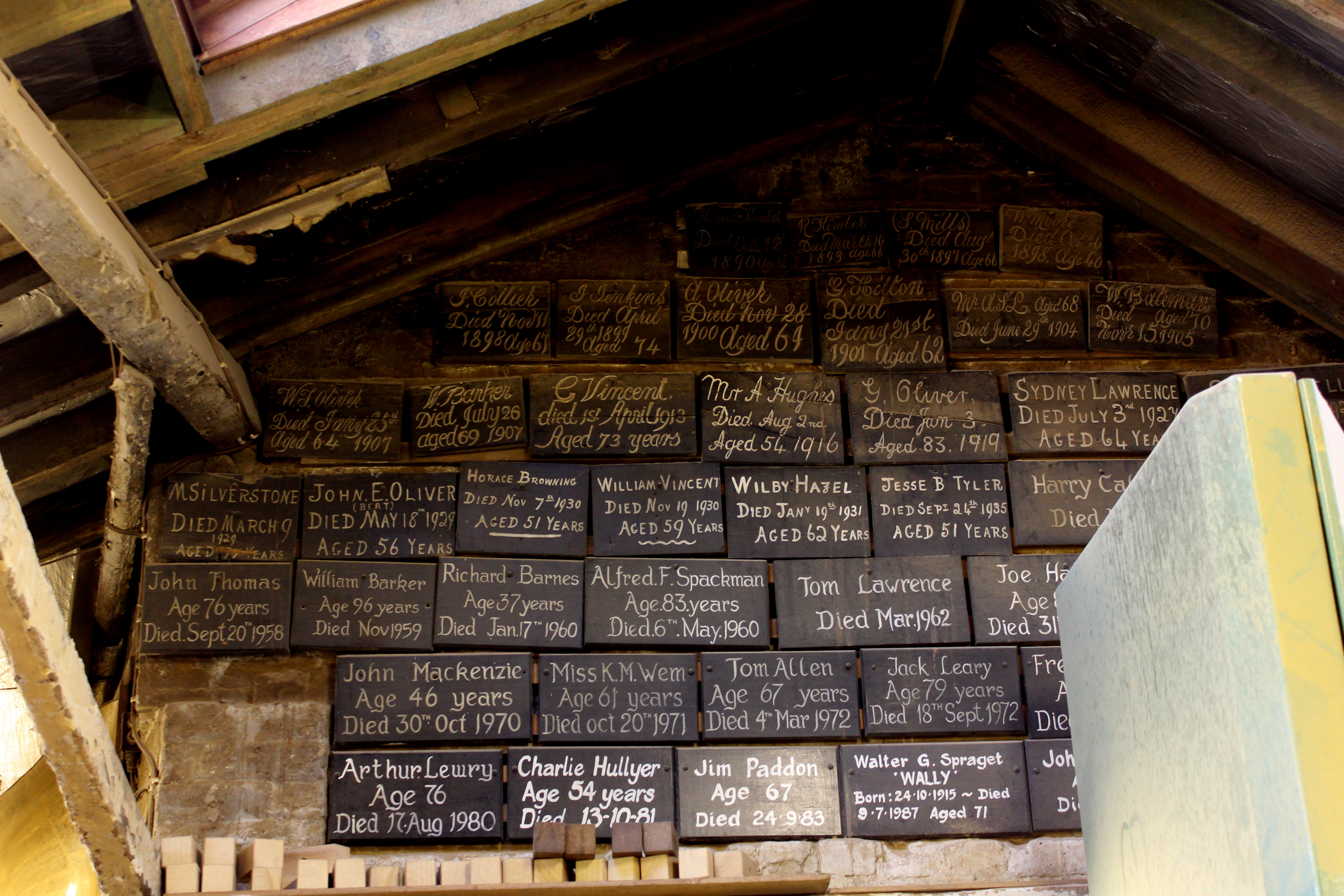
Bell makers' memorial inside the foundry

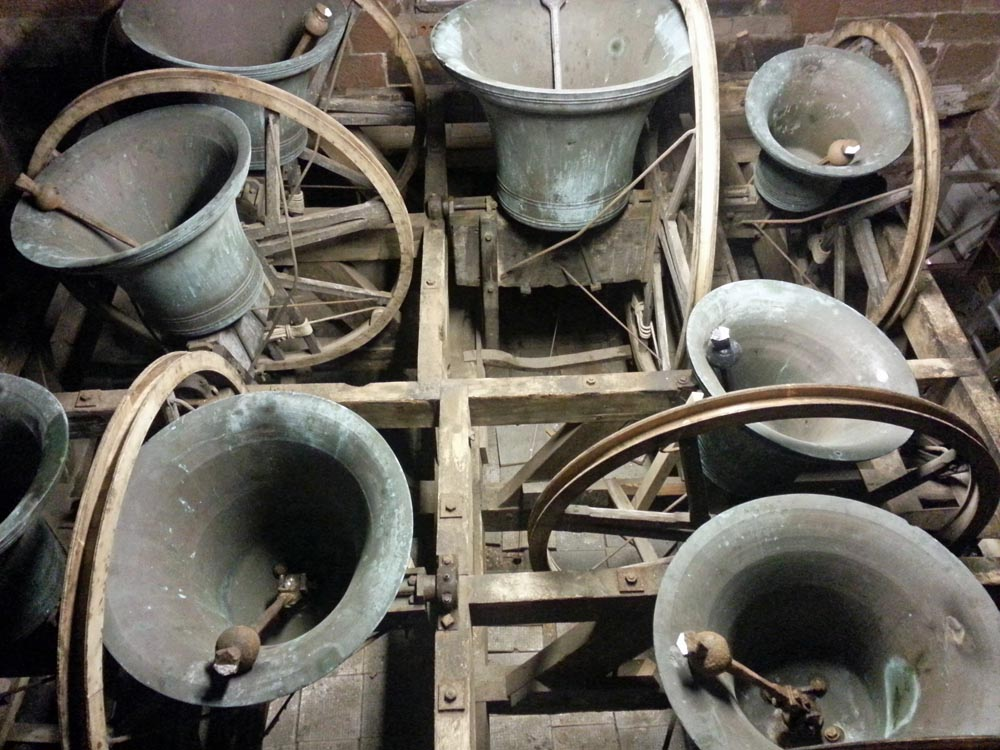
The bells of St Bees Priory shown in the "up" position. Cast by Charles & George Mears in 1857

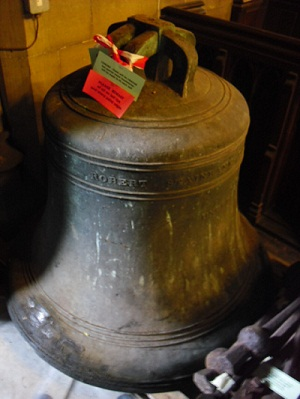
The Robert Stainbank tenor bell from Todmorden Unitarian Church, West Yorkshire, during overhaul in 2014. The bell was cast in 1868.

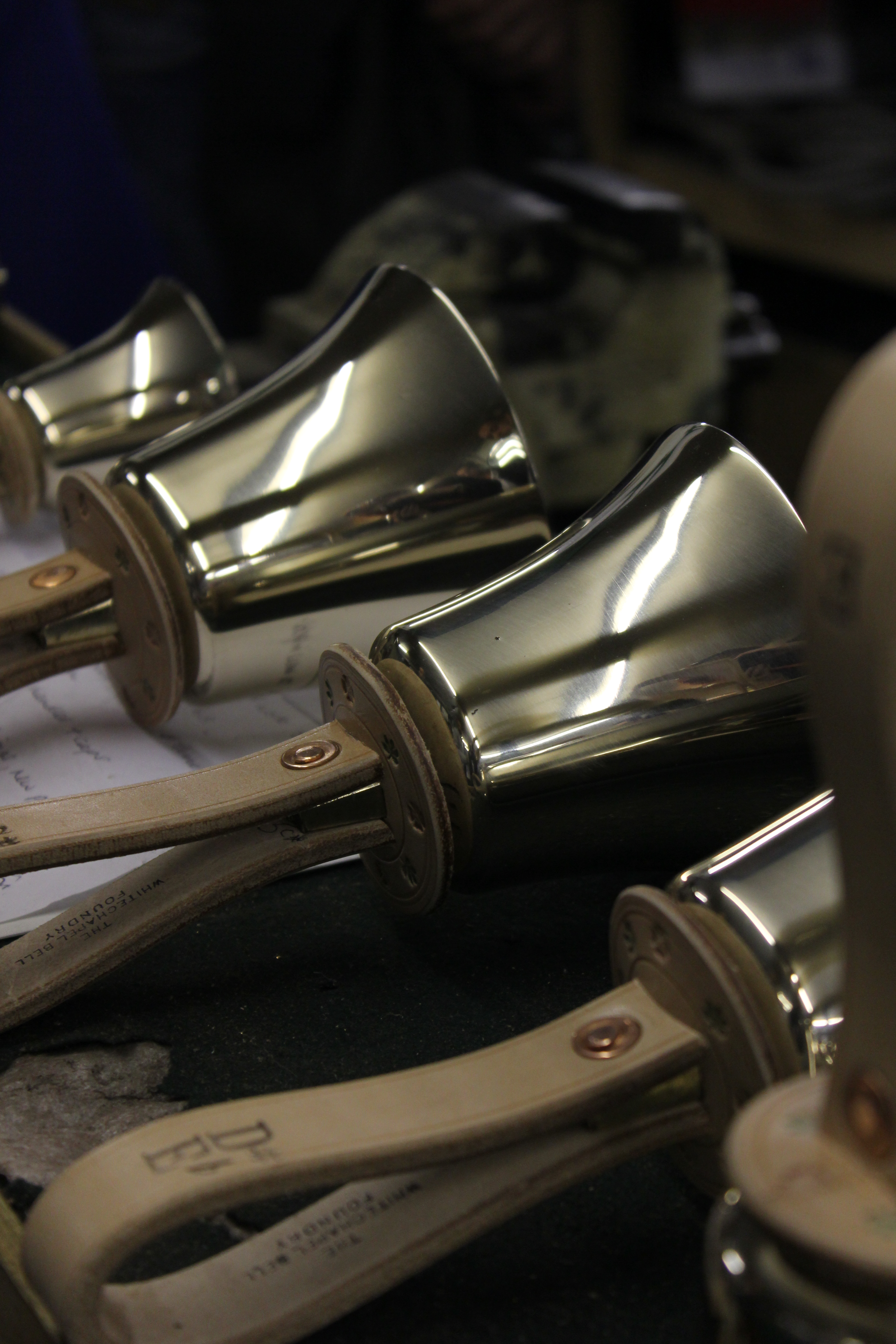
Handbells on the workbench at the foundry

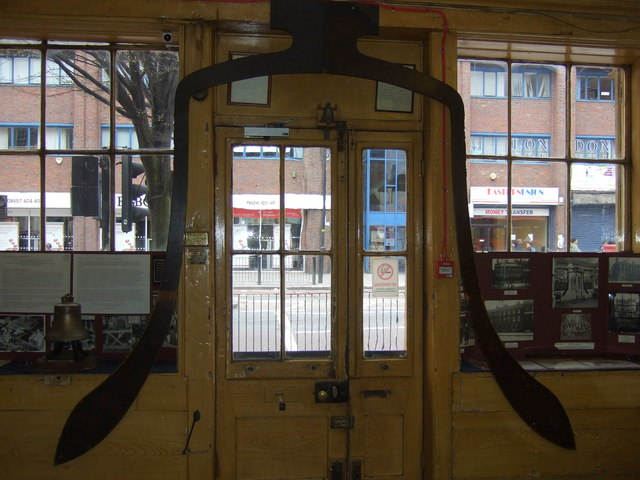
Template for Big Ben which hangs at the foundry

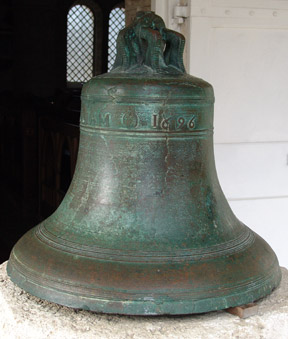
The oldest bell in Barbados (1696)

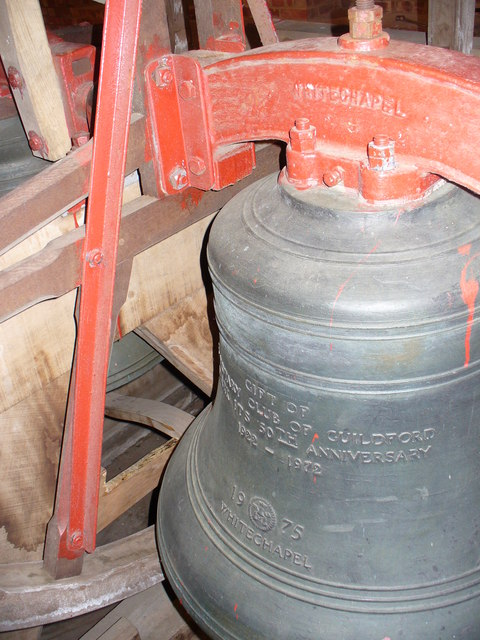
Guildford Cathedral bell cast at Whitechapel

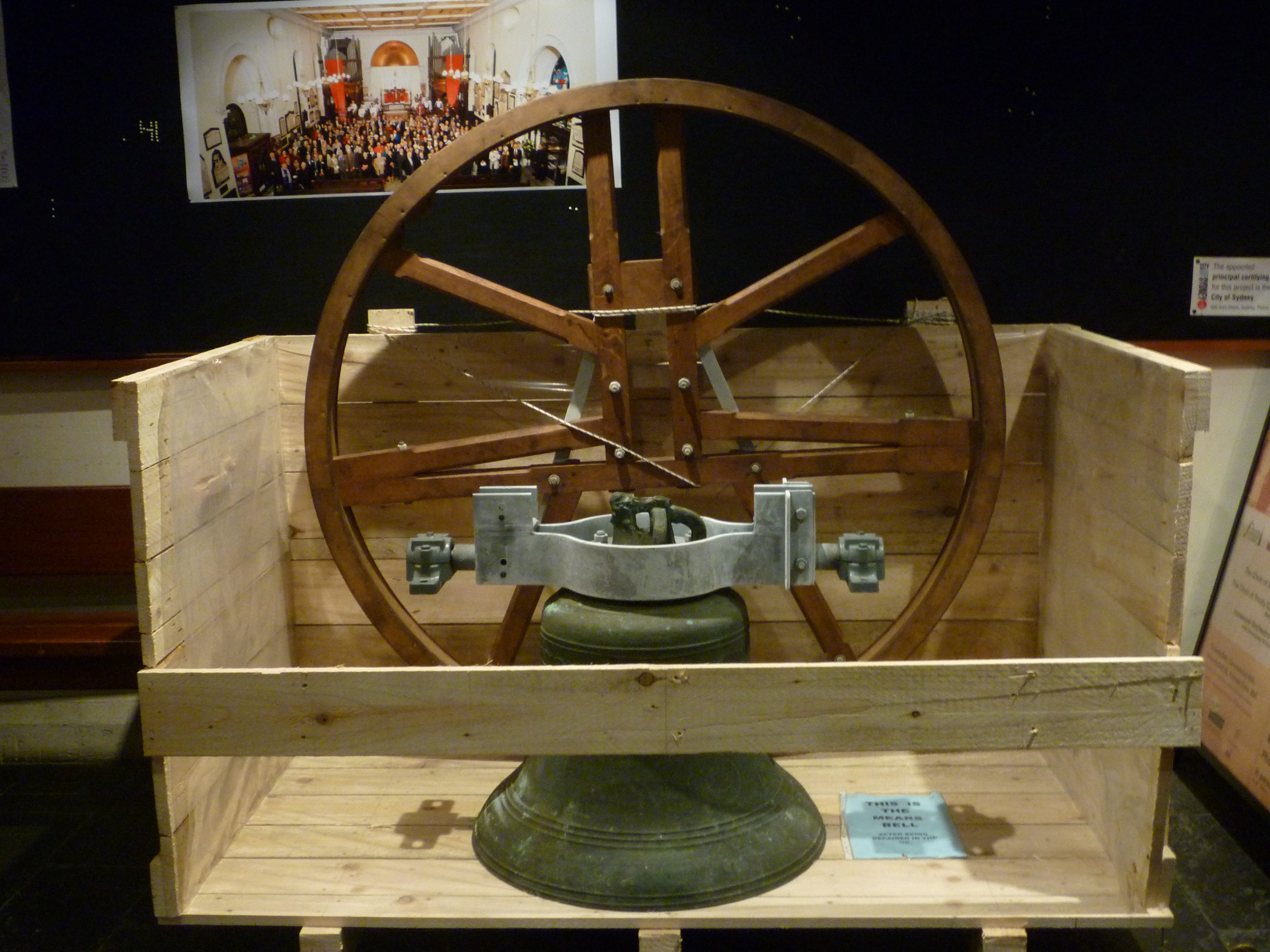
Mears Bell, St James' Church, Sydney waiting to be re-hung after repairs in 2011

== Sources ==
- Foreman, Lewis; Foreman, Susan (2005). London: A Musical Gazetteer. London: Yale University Press. ISBN 978-0-300-10402-8.
- Winn, Christopher (2007). I Never Knew That About London. London: Ebury Press. ISBN 978-0-09-194319-6.
