= Thames Diamond Jubilee Pageant =

2012 Royal Jubilee celebrations in London

Coordinates: 51°30′20″N 0°04′32″W

- Date: 3 June 2012
- Location: Thames River, London
- Type: Boat parade
- Theme: Diamond Jubilee of Elizabeth II
- Organised by: Thames Diamond Jubilee Foundation

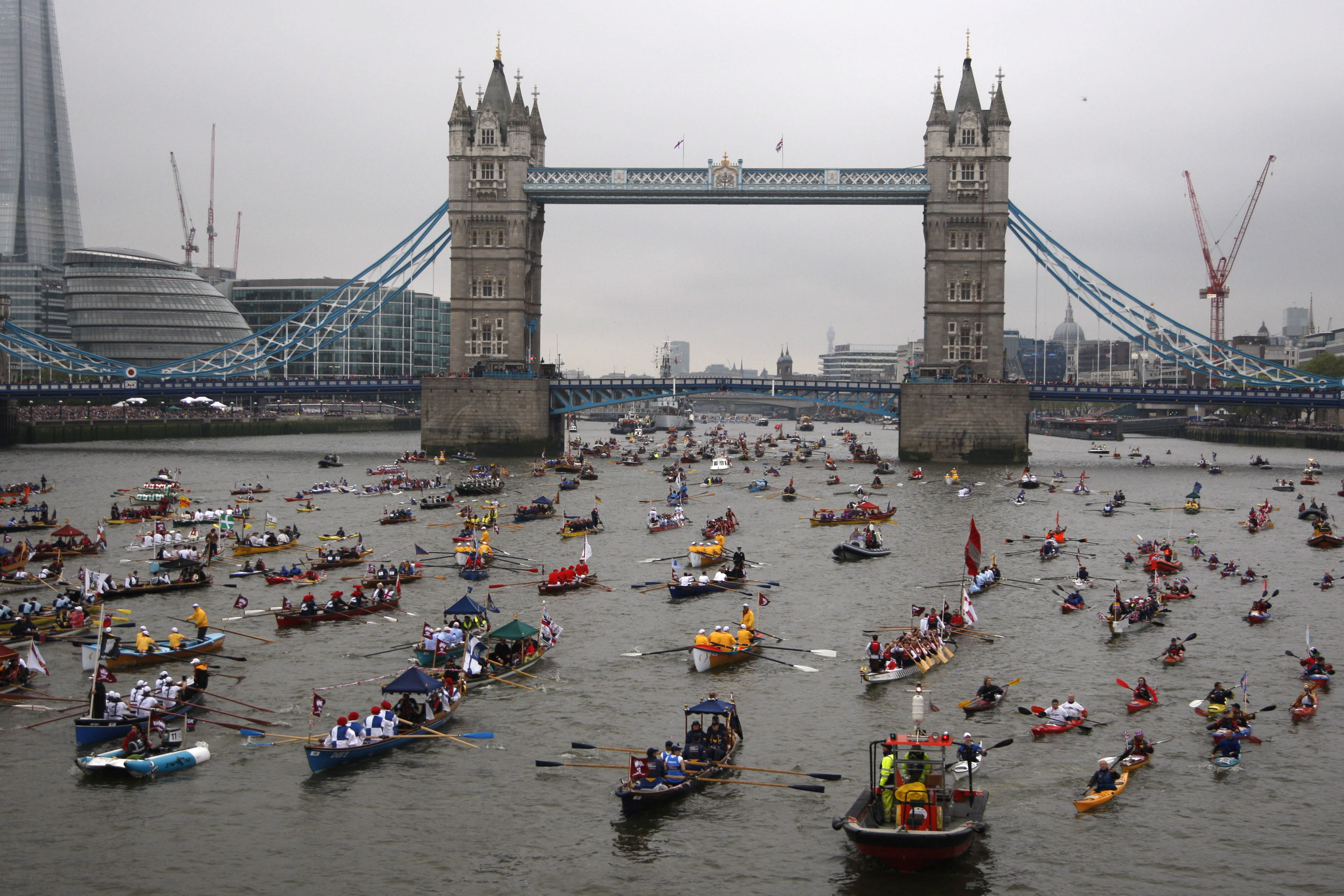
Hundreds of vessels pass Tower Bridge

The Thames Diamond Jubilee Pageant was a parade on 3 June 2012 of 670 boats on the Tideway of the River Thames in London as part of the celebrations of the Diamond Jubilee of Elizabeth II. The Queen, Prince Philip and other members of the Royal Family were aboard vessels that took part in the parade. The parade was organised by the Thames Diamond Jubilee Foundation, and funded by private donations and sponsorship. The pageant master was Adrian Evans.

The vessels that took part included military, commercial, and pleasure craft. According to Guinness World Records, this was the largest ever parade of boats, surpassing the previous record of 327 vessels set in Bremerhaven, Germany, in 2011. Sailing vessels and others too tall to pass under the bridges were moored as an "Avenue of Sail" downstream of London Bridge with smaller craft in St Katherine Docks.

British media organisations estimated that one million spectators watched from the banks of the Thames The pageant was broadcast live by the BBC and Sky News and subsequently broadcast around the world on other networks. More than 10 million tuned into the BBC's four-and-a-half-hour coverage, with an audience average of 10.3 million.

== Planning and route ==
The route and schedule of the pageant

The organisers of the pageant were the Thames Diamond Jubilee Foundation, chaired by Robert Gascoyne-Cecil, 7th Marquess of Salisbury, with Michael Lockett as the Chief Executive of the Pageant and Pageant Master, Adrian Evans. Other bodies involved in the organisation included the Port of London Authority, the RNLI, the Metropolitan Police, the Maritime and Coastguard Agency and the Environment Agency.

The pageant was planned with inspiration from a painting by the 18th-century Venetian painter, Canaletto. The painting Lord Mayor's Day on the Thames depicts a flotilla against a background of London, including St Paul's Cathedral. The painting was loaned for an exhibition at the National Maritime Museum, Greenwich from the Lobkowicz Collections, Prague.

The pageant took a route from Wandsworth to Tower Bridge. From the launch at Cadogan Pier, the flotilla travelled under 14 of London's Thames bridges – Chelsea Bridge, Grosvenor Bridge, Vauxhall Bridge, Lambeth Bridge, Westminster Bridge, Hungerford Bridge and Golden Jubilee Bridges, Waterloo Bridge, Blackfriars Bridge, Blackfriars Railway Bridge, Millennium Bridge, Southwark Bridge, Cannon Street Railway Bridge, London Bridge, and Tower Bridge.

The Thames was closed to normal navigation. To help ensure smooth conditions, particularly for the many rowed craft, the organisers had arranged for the annual high tide test closure of the Thames Barrier to take place on the same day as the parade.

=== Projected timings ===
| Bridge | Time (BST) |
|---|---|
| Battersea Bridge | 14:25 |
| Albert Bridge | 14:45 |
| Chelsea Bridge | 15:00 |
| Vauxhall Bridge | 15:10 |
| Westminster Bridge | 15:25 |
| Waterloo Bridge | 15:30 |
| Blackfriars Bridge | 15:40 |
| Southwark Bridge | 15:45 |
| London Bridge | 15:50 |
| Tower Bridge | 16:00 |

=== Flotilla sections ===
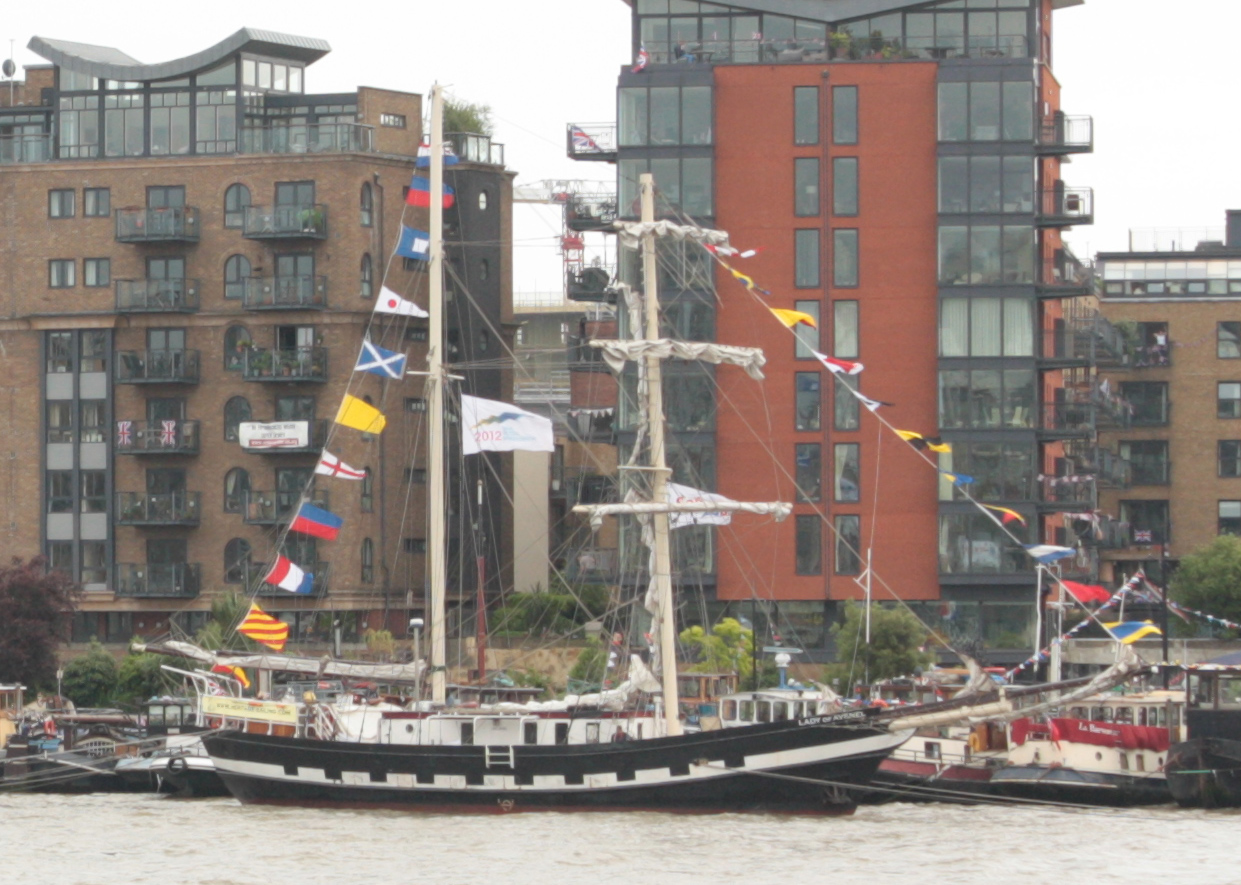
Lady of Avenel (Netherlands)

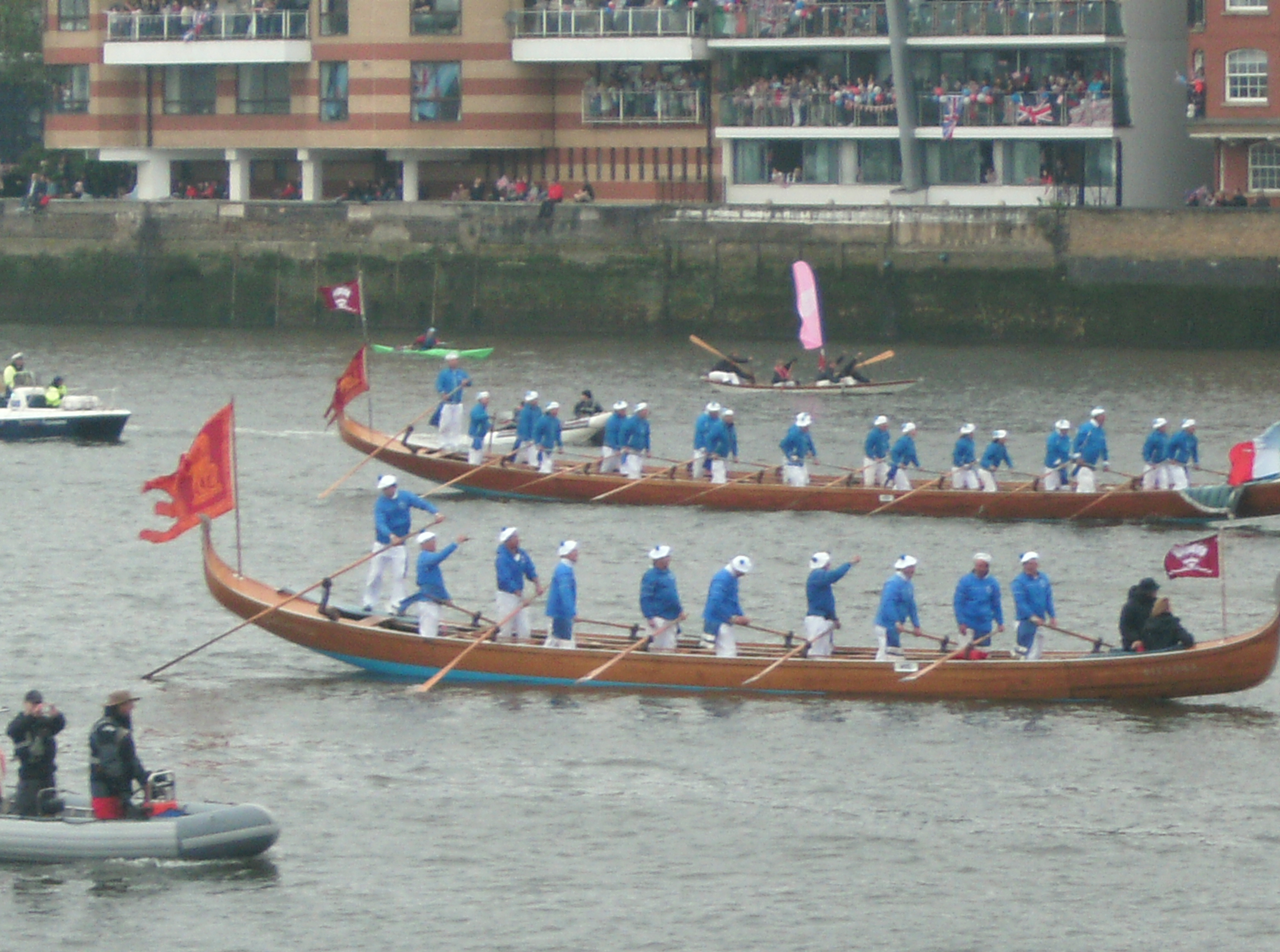
Gondolas in the parade

The flotilla proceeded in sections preceded by Music Herald Barges:

- Royal Jubilee Bells
- Man-powered boats
- Academy of Ancient Music
- Royal Squadron, with Spirit of Chartwell carrying the Queen.
- Band of Her Majesty's Royal Marines Plymouth
- Dunkirk Little Ships
- Shree Muktajeevan Pipe Band and Dhol Ensemble
- Historic boats
- The Jubilant Commonwealth Choir
- Service, steam and working vessels
- Leisure vessels
- New Water Music
- Narrowboats and barges
- Mayor's Jubilee Band
- Passenger boats
- Rhythm on the River
- Downriver passenger boats
- London Philharmonic Orchestra (on board Bateaux London's vessel Symphony)

== Parade ==
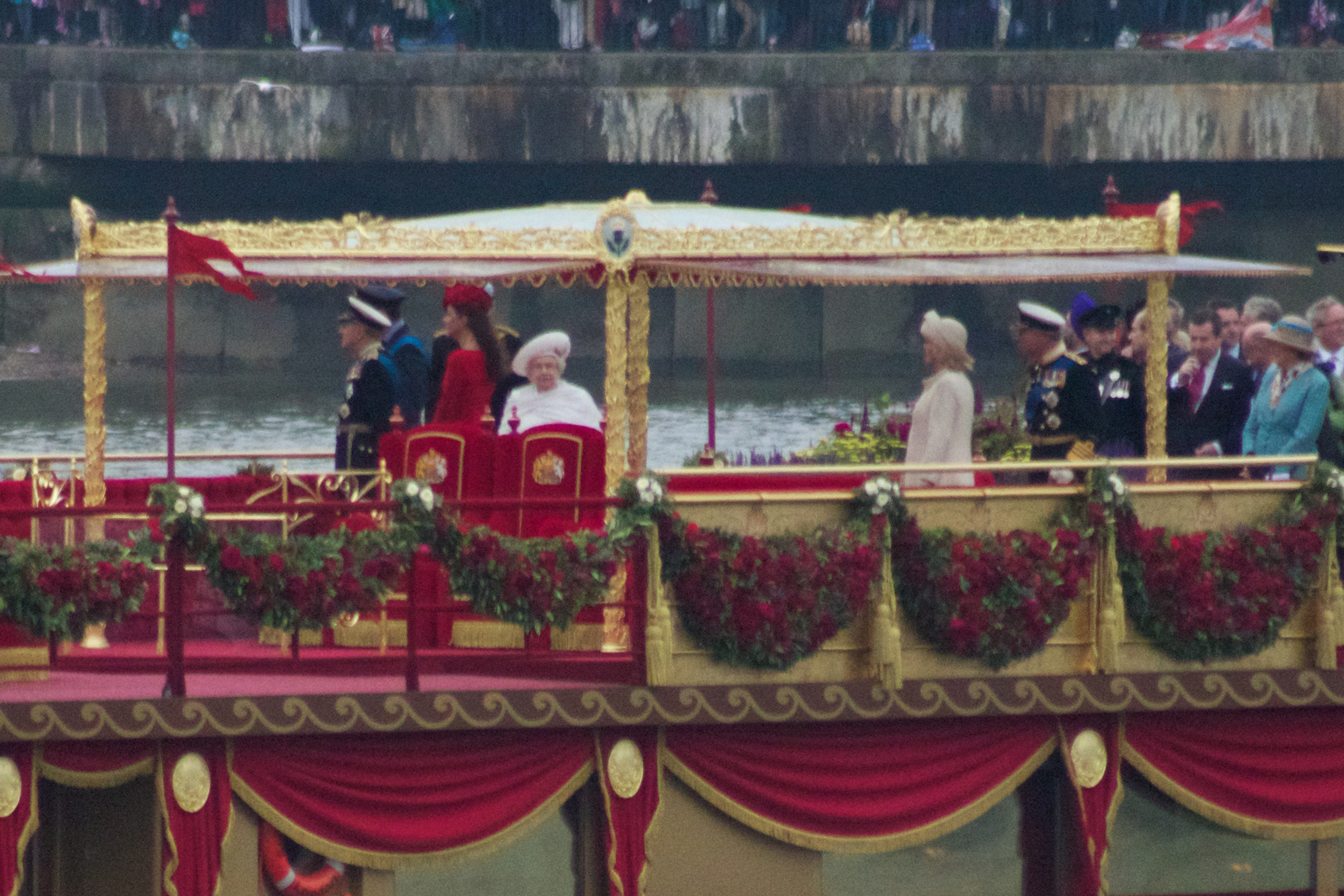
The Queen and members of the Royal Family aboard the Spirit of Chartwell

=== The Queen and the Royal Family ===
At approximately 14:15, the Royal Launch from HMY Britannia carried Queen Elizabeth II and Prince Philip, Duke of Edinburgh to the royal barge MV Spirit of Chartwell, which was moored at Cadogan Pier, slightly downstream of the Albert Bridge. The Spirit of Chartwell, a 210-foot (64 m) motor vessel with a top speed of 11 knots (13 mph; 20 km/h), was donated as the royal barge for the pageant and enhanced over the course of a year with symbols and ciphers that referred to the coronation, the Commonwealth and the Gold State Coach, and had a crown displayed on the bow. The royal barge was further decorated for the occasion with thousands of flowers and plants, and hung with drapery with the arms of Commonwealth countries. The royal party, of the Queen, Prince Philip, Prince Charles, the Duchess of Cornwall, Prince William, the Duchess of Cambridge and Prince Harry, stood on the upper deck of the vessel, under a gilt canopy decorated with red drapery, in the style of royal barges of the 17th and 18th centuries.

The Queen was attended by Lady Susan Hussey, her lady-in-waiting for more than 50 years; her deputy private secretary, Edward Young; her equerry, Lieutenant Colonel Dan Rex; and waterman, Christopher Livett. Other guests on the barge included Richard Chartres, the Bishop of London; Kamalesh Sharma, the Commonwealth Secretary-General; Poet Laureate Carol Ann Duffy, historian Simon Schama and Sir Donald Gosling with his partner Gabriella Di Nora.

=== Fashion ===
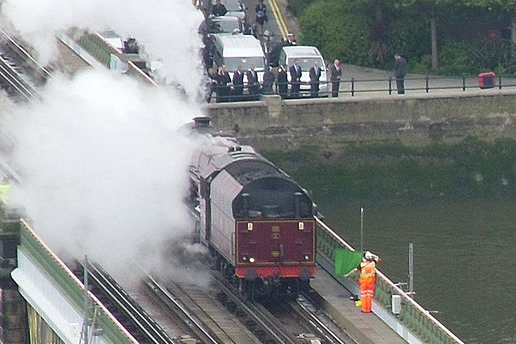
LMS Princess Royal Class 6201 Princess Elizabeth signalling the start of the pageant

The Queen wore an ensemble designed by royal couturier Angela Kelly, comprising dress, coat, hat and shawl. The coat, which had a pleated frill at the front and neck, was of ivory boucle, decorated with gold, silver and ivory paillettes and Swarovski crystals. The matching hat had a small cockade of feathers in gold, silver and ivory, each trimmed with a crystal. Her jewels were the diamond starburst "Jardine brooch", a three-strand pearl necklace, and pearl earrings that had belonged to her grandmother, Queen Mary. The Duchess of Cornwall wore a cream ensemble with sleeves decorated with gold paillettes, by Anna Valentine, and a hat by Philip Treacy. Her jewellery was a four-strand pearl-and-diamond choker. The Duchess of Cambridge wore a scarlet long-sleeved dress with pleated skirt by Alexander McQueen with matching hat by Sylvia Fletcher, of royal milliner James Lock & Co., and carried a red satin clutch bag. She wore a brooch with two dolphins, the symbol of the Royal Navy Submarine Service. The Sophie, Duchess of Edinburgh wore a printed dress by Emilia Wickstead. Princess Beatrice wore a silver and navy dress by Susannah, a navy blue coat by Marni, and pink and silver hat by Stephen Jones. Princess Eugenie wore a dress by Roland Mouret in coral pink, teamed with a Moschino cardigan, and Stephen Jones hat. Prince Philip, the Prince of Wales, the Duke of York, the Princess Royal and Sir Timothy Laurence wore Royal Navy uniforms of various ranks. The Duke of Cambridge wore the uniform of a Royal Air Force flight lieutenant, and Prince Harry wore the uniform of a captain in the British Army's Blues and Royals along with the blue beret of the Army Air Corps.

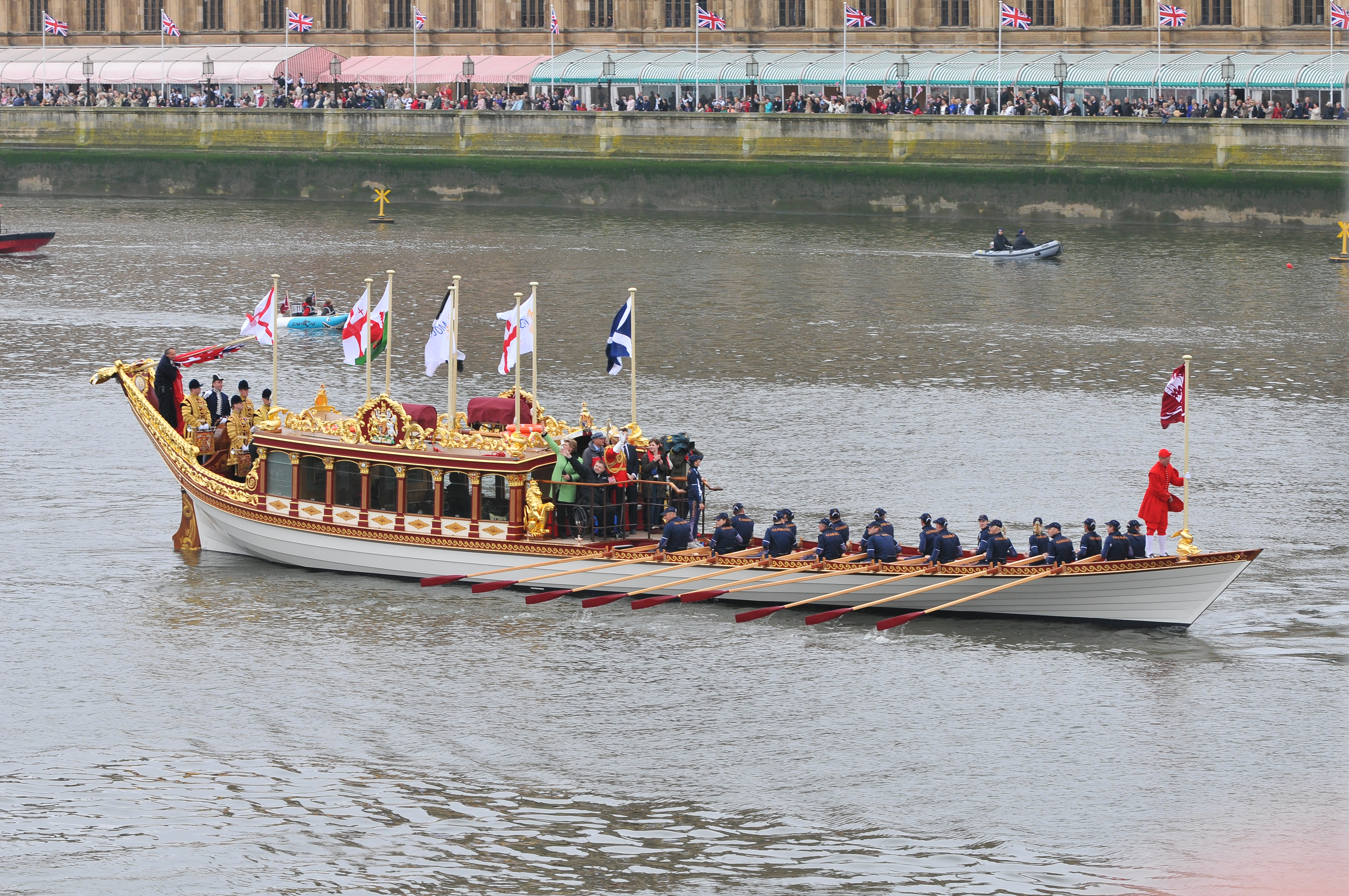
The newly commissioned Royal Barge Gloriana led the rowed vessels.

=== Fleet ===
The procession of boats, which was 7.5 miles (12.1 km) long, was formed up in sections, each led by a "Herald Music Barge" carrying ensembles playing music of different genres. The procession took approximately 90 minutes to pass any given point on the river, while it was recorded as comprising 670 vessels of various types, both historic and modern. Participating vessels came mainly from the UK with some Commonwealth, and a few non-Commonwealth participants. They ranged from rowing boats to sail and steam-powered vessels with historic vessels including many of the surviving Dunkirk little ships, a Māori waka (war canoe) which was present at the signing of the Treaty of Waitangi in 1840 and the tall ship Amazon which was present at Queen Victoria's Diamond Jubilee Royal Fleet Review. Also taking part was the gig St Michael's Mount State Barge which was rowed rather than sailed down the river. Built around 1740, it is believed to be the oldest operational boat in the world and had ferried Queen Victoria in 1846. The start of the pageant was signalled by a whistle from steam locomotive 6201 Princess Elizabeth on Battersea Railway Bridge. The Royal Family watched the beginning of the parade from the moored royal barge. Leading the pageant was a floating belfry fitted with eight bells, newly cast by Whitechapel Bell Foundry for the Church of St James Garlickhythe. Named after the eight senior members of the Royal Family and granted the title "The Royal Jubilee Bells", their sound was answered by churches along the route and around the UK.

=== Man-powered vessels ===
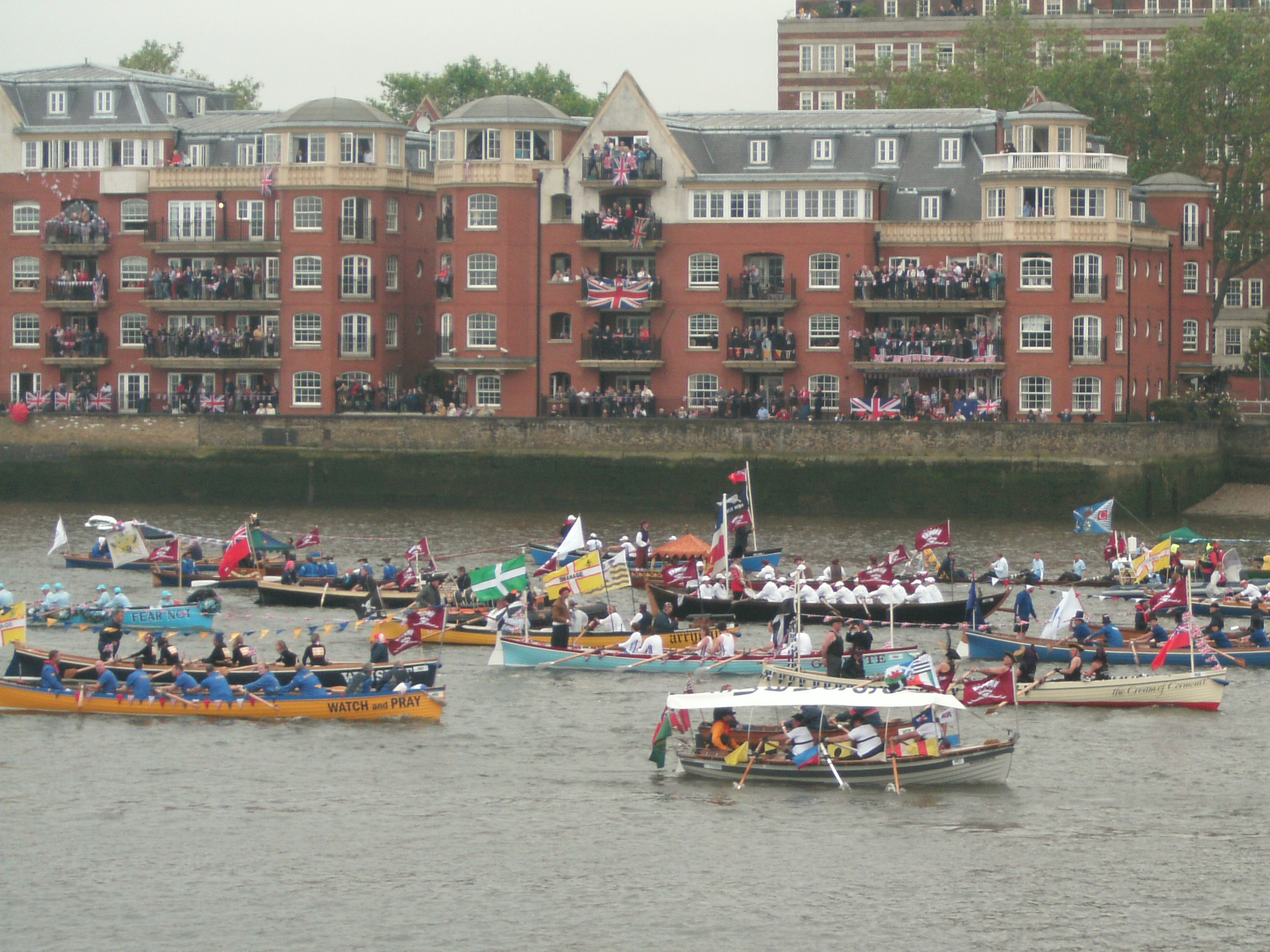
A great variety of man-powered boats took part in the parade

The section of man-powered boats set the pace for the pageant, and was led by the 27-metre-long (89 ft) Gloriana, a rowing barge privately commissioned as a tribute to the Queen for the 2012 Jubilee. Built in the classicising style of 18th-century royal barges and decorated with gold leaf, she will be given to the Queen after the pageant. The Gloriana carried ten flags, among them those representing the four home nations: England, Scotland, Wales and Northern Ireland, as well as the flag of the City of London and the flag of Cornwall. She was powered by 18 rowers, including Olympic medallists Steve Redgrave, Matthew Pinsent, and Guin and Miriam Batten. The flotilla of rowed vessels which followed included the Royal Shallop Jubilant, Waterman's cutters, of the City Livery Companies, Skiffs from Thames skiff and punting clubs, Gigs from coastal rowing clubs, kayaks, gondolas, dragon boats, replica Viking longships, and a jolly boat full of pirates. A separate fleet of 50 safety boats, provided by the charity Northern Exposure Rescue, escorted the man-powered vessels from Putney Embankment to South Dock. The charity was selected especially due to their involvement in the annual Great River Race.

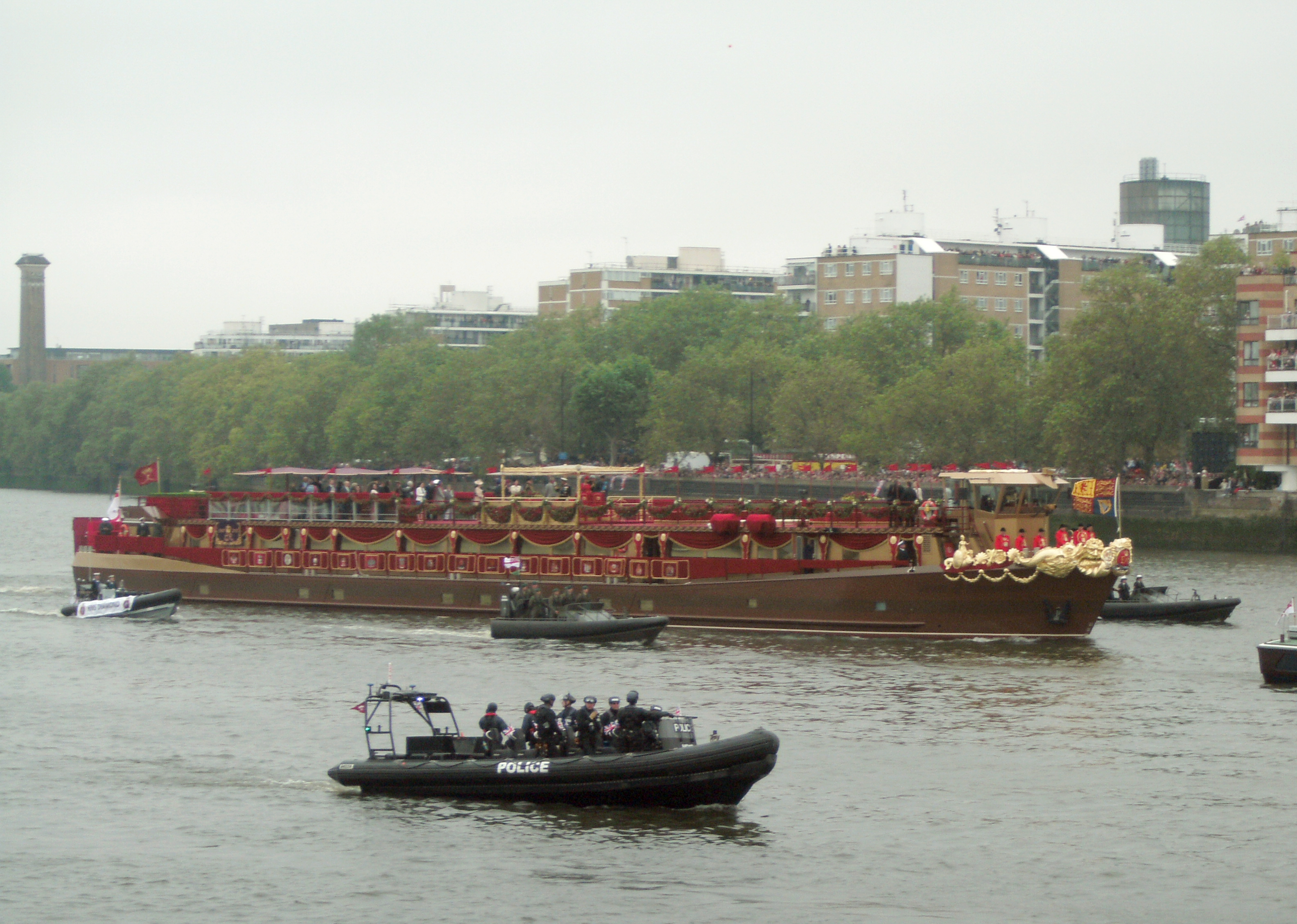
The Spirit of Chartwell

=== Royal convoy ===
Preceding the Royal Convoy, were fifty five dinghies, which sailed in diamond formation, each bearing the flag of a Commonwealth Country and carrying Sea Cadets from the UK, Bermuda and Hong Kong.

The Spirit of Chartwell joined the procession, preceded by the Trinity House No 1 Boat, carrying the Princess Royal, as pilot vessel, and convoyed by two escort boats from the retired Royal Yacht Britannia, and naval and military vessels. She was accompanied by the Connaught, carrying the officers of the College of Arms, the Court of the Lord Lyon, and the Canadian Heraldic Authority. Prince Andrew, Duke of York, and Prince Edward, Earl of Wessex, and their families followed on board the Havengore, which in 1965 had carried the body of Sir Winston Churchill along the Thames. As the parade passed the National Theatre, the life-sized puppet horse from the play War Horse appeared on the roof as a salute to the Queen, who was visibly delighted.

=== Powered vessels ===
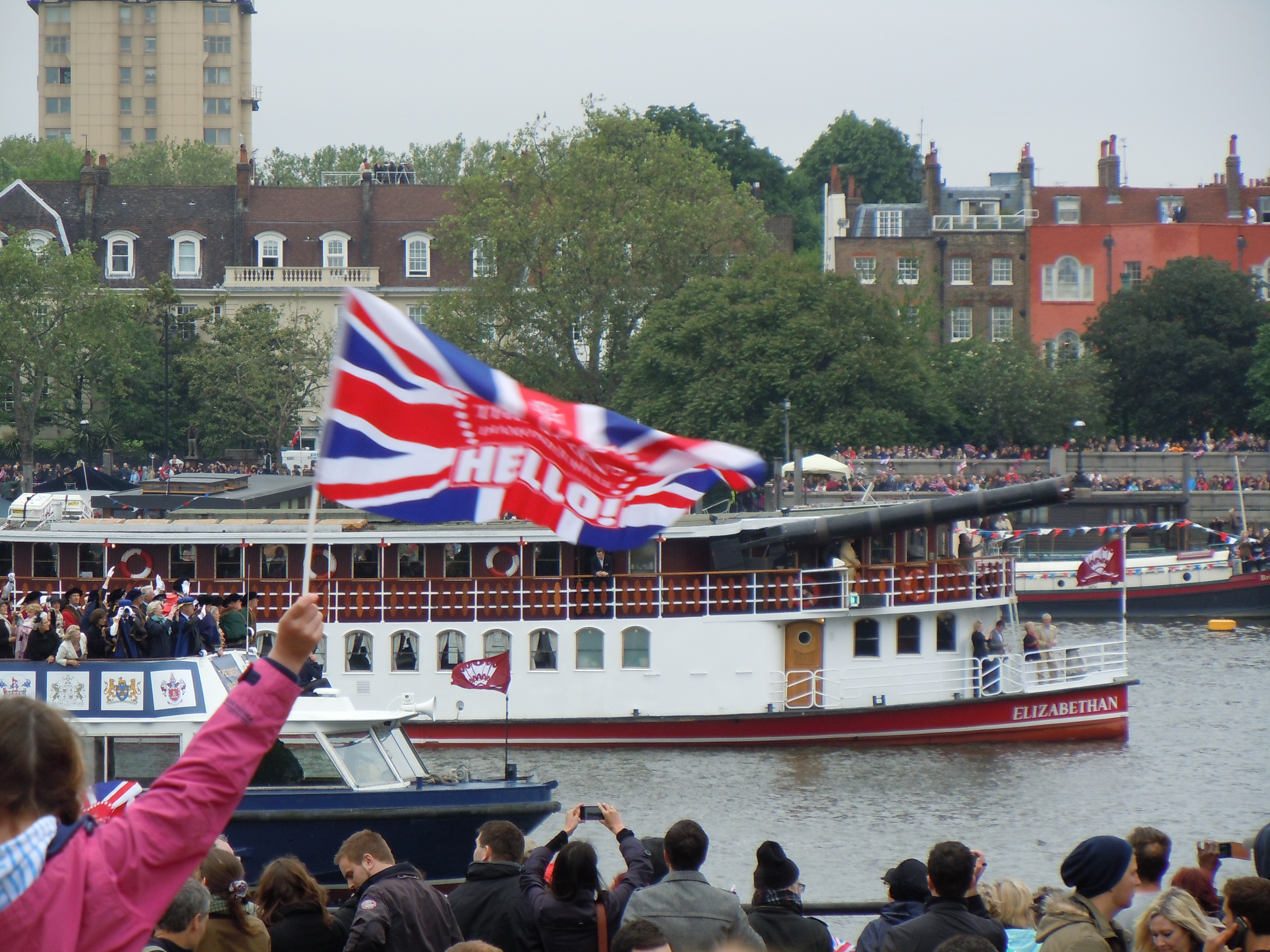
Powered vessels in the pageant

Following the Royal convoy came groups of powered vessels. These included a number of now very rare steam vessels, Alaska, the oldest working passenger vessel on the Thames, and the tugs Barking and Kennet. Among the working vessels were Amaryllis, umpire's launch for the Henley Royal Regatta; White Heather, the only surviving narrow-beam London canal tug; the Stork HM Customs and Excise boat, James Stevens No.14, the world's oldest motor lifeboat; and the Massey Shaw fireboat of the London Fire Brigade, veteran of Operation Dynamo, Dunkirk. The Dunkirk Little Ships flotilla comprised fifty-five small craft, with a further five vessels in other sections. They included Sir Malcolm Campbell's Blue Bird of Chelsea, the Breda from the TV series The Prisoner, and MTB102 which also carried Churchill and Eisenhower on 3 June 1944 to view the D-Day fleet. Forces vessels included Royal Naval Steam Cutter No. 438, built the year of the Diamond Jubilee of Queen Victoria; RASCV Humber, the last wooden vessel in service with the Army, and Atta Boy, a launch from HMS Royalist at the Battle of Jutland in 1916. The Cornish fishing lugger Barnabas, built in 1881, had sailed 450 miles from Cornwall for the pageant, and carried St Piran's Flag, the largest flag born by any vessel in the flotilla.

Narrowboats and barges came from all over the UK, many travelling for weeks along hundreds of miles of inland waterways and through many locks to take part in the parade. They included President representing the Lord-Lieutenant of Staffordshire, Beatty from Merseyside, Hazelnut from Byfleet, Centenary from Warwickshire, Lord Toulouse from Worcestershire, Marie Celeste from Lancashire, Oh Be Joyful from Cheshire, the Mountbatten Crusader from Northamptonshire, and the Shropshire Lad and Shropshire Lass which include in their crews disabled servicemen and civilians. A number of Dutch barges, used as houseboats on rivers in the UK also took part. They were followed by launches, cruisers and passenger vessels of various kinds, containing many spectators.

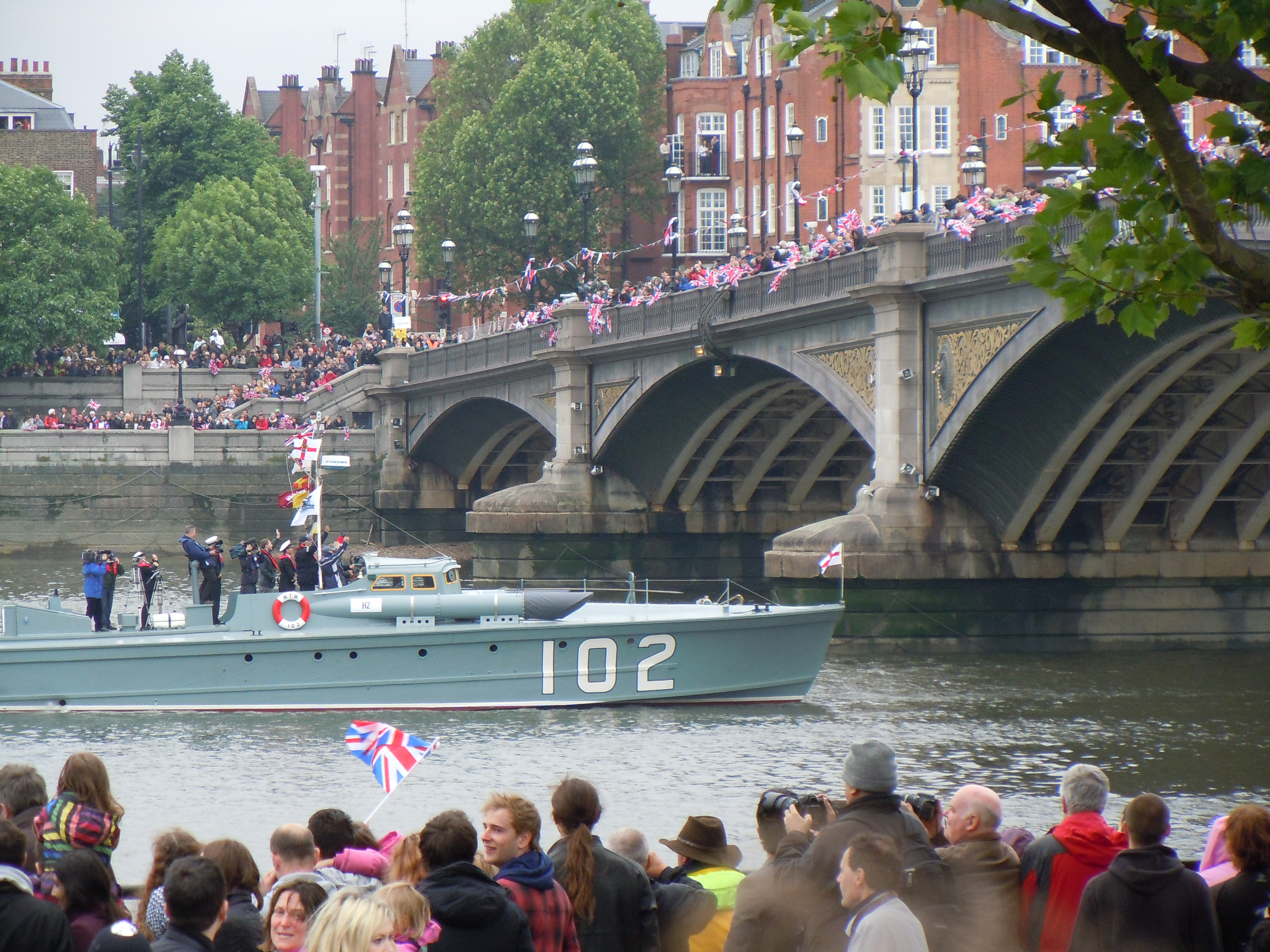
Spectators lined the embankments. World War II British coastal warship MTB 102 passes under Battersea Bridge.

=== Finale ===
When the Spirit of Chartwell neared Tower Bridge, the Queen was saluted by the guns, the naval cadets and veterans aboard HMS Belfast. The bascules of the Tower Bridge were then raised through the full 80 degrees in Royal salute. The royal barge docked at HMS President, where it was anticipated that the Queen and Royal party would watch the rest of the procession from the first floor. However, despite the increasingly inclement weather, the 86-year-old Queen chose to remain on the Spirit of Chartwell, standing continuously for nearly four hours, waving and acknowledging the salutes of the spectators, until the end of the procession. She was accompanied by Prince Philip, the Prince of Wales and Duchess of Cornwall, the Duke and Duchess of Cambridge, Prince Harry and Lady Susan Hussey. The final vessel in the procession was a barge carrying the London Philharmonic Orchestra and the Royal College of Music Chamber Choir. The orchestra and their instruments were safely under cover, but the choir stood in the pouring rain, singing encores of "Land of Hope and Glory" as they made their way from London Bridge. As the orchestra drew up along the Royal Barge, they played the Hornpipe, which set the Royal Family and the veterans on HMS Belfast jigging and many umbrellas along the embankment bobbing in time with the music. They finished their musical selection with "Rule Britannia" and "God Save the Queen". The pageant finished with the bascules of the bridge lowering as fireworks shot from its upper deck and craft on the river sounded their horns. The planned flypast finale was cancelled, due to the weather.

Despite the cold and rainy weather, the riverside was crowded with spectators along the entire route, many having camped overnight to secure a place, and many others watched the event from nearby on large screens and in pubs.

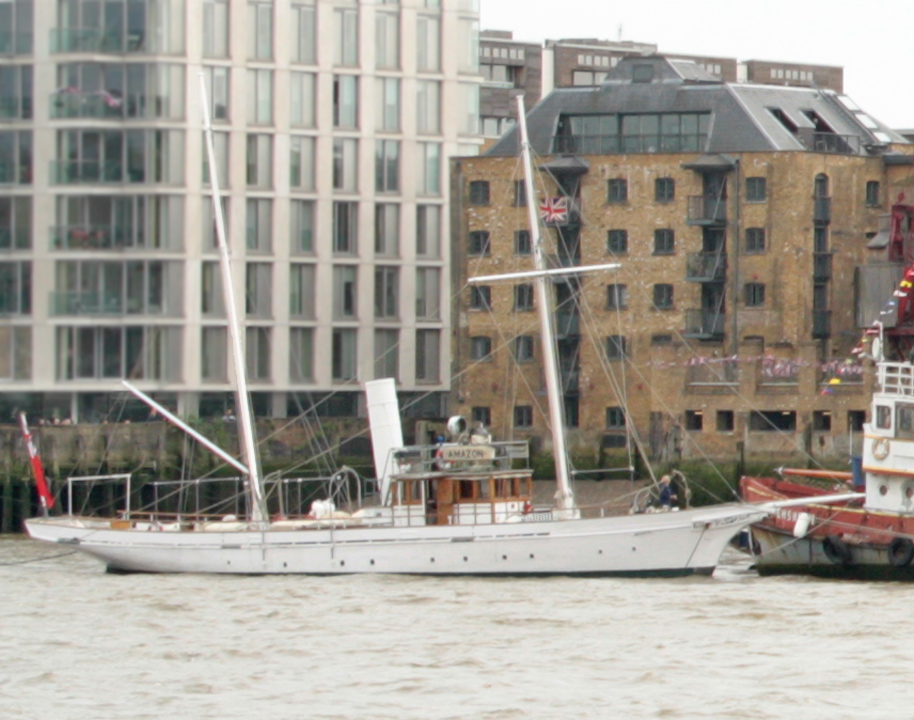
Amazon was at Queen Victoria's Diamond Jubilee Royal Fleet Review.

=== Avenue of Sail ===
Downstream from the London Bridge was an "Avenue of Sail", where powered and sailing vessels too tall to pass under the city's bridges were moored on either side of the river. These included Amazon, an 1885 pleasure yacht that was present at the 1897 naval review marking Queen Victoria's Diamond Jubilee; the sail training brig, TS Royalist; Belem, a three-masted sail training ship; the Golden Hinde replica of Sir Francis Drake's historic ship; the Matthew of Bristol, a replica of a Tudor merchant ship; the Provident, a Brixham trawler, Gypsy Moth IV in which Sir Francis Chichester solo-circumnavigated the world, Sail Training Vessel Challenge Wales | Wales' Tall Ship which works with young people to improve their employment prospects, Sheemaun (Motor Yacht) a 1930s Gentleman's Motor Yacht that served in WW2 as HMY Sheemaun an armed Thames Estuary Auxiliary Patrol Boat and the Tenacious, of the Jubilee Sailing Trust which provides opportunity for able-bodied and disabled people to sail together.

=== Music ===
Music was specially commissioned from a number of British composers to be performed on a series of "Herald Music Barges" in the pageant. The poet laureate Carol Ann Duffy wrote an eight-verse poem, Common Wealth, to mark the event and this was set to music by the composer Orlando Gough. In all, the pageant featured new works by thirteen modern British composers including Anne Dudley, Graham Fitkin, Gavin Greenaway, Christopher Gunning, Howard Goodall, Adrian Johnston, John Lunn, Julian Nott, Jocelyn Pook, Rachel Portman, Stephen Warbeck and Debbie Wiseman.

The performers on the Herald Music Barges were the Academy of Ancient Music, The Band of Her Majesty's Royal Marines, Plymouth; Shree Muktajeevan Pipe Band & Dhol Ensemble, the Jubilant Commonwealth Choir, the New Water Music, the Mayor's Jubilee Band and Rhythm on the River. The final barge carried the London Philharmonic Orchestra and the Royal College of Music Chamber Choir, performing music associated with different buildings and monuments along the river, including the James Bond theme, the Dambusters March and Rule Britannia.

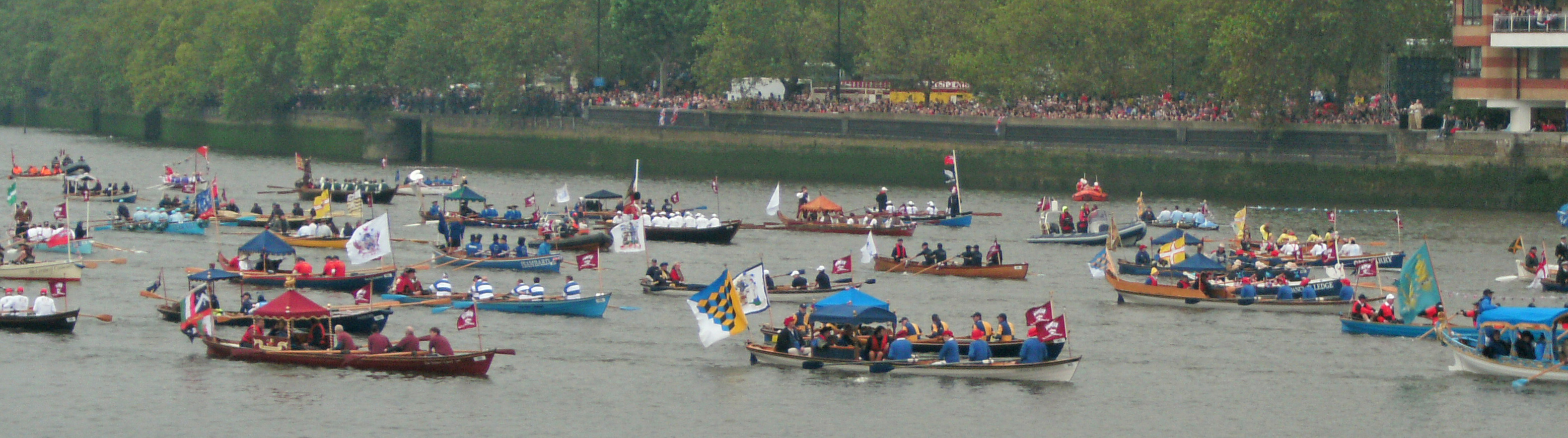
The flotilla of man-powered boats included the cutters of the City of London's Livery Companies.

== Protest, problems and criticisms ==
During the event, the advocacy group Republic staged a protest, which attracted around 500 protesters.

Forty-six people from the boats were treated for the effects of the cold weather, and six were taken to hospital with symptoms of hypothermia.

Despite the event passing off peacefully, concerns have been raised by both The Guardian and later Lord Prescott about the mistreatment of unpaid staff used to provide security for the event. According to The Guardian reports some staff were, in effect, sleeping rough.

The live television coverage of the pageant by the BBC was the subject of some media criticism and the broadcast reportedly attracted over 4500 complaints from members of the public. The presenters started by telling everyone the pageant commemorated the '60th anniversary of the coronation' of 'Her Royal Highness' the Queen. Later they identified the hat that 'Nelson wore at Waterloo.' Some commentators took the view that BBC presenters on the day had concentrated too much on interviews with celebrities and that they were insufficiently prepared to add depth to the TV commentary. The actor and writer Stephen Fry was of the opinion that the coverage was "mind-numbingly tedious", while Ben Dowell in The Guardian singled out the lack of television coverage given to the composers and performers who were commissioned to write music and perform on the Thames barges. Poet Laureate Carol Ann Duffy and composers Orlando Gough and Gavin Greenaway also expressed their frustration about the coverage. BBC creative director Alan Yentob defended the BBC's coverage, citing high audience approval ratings, and Director-General of the BBC Mark Thompson congratulated BBC staff for their work on the broadcast.

== See also ==
- Queen's Bargemaster
- Great River Race
- Fleet review (Commonwealth realms)
