= Royal Jubilee Bells =

The Royal Jubilee Bells are a set of eight bells that were cast for the church of St James Garlickhythe in the City of London, which were seen on television around the world leading the Thames Diamond Jubilee Pageant on 3 June 2012 for the Diamond Jubilee of Elizabeth II.

== The Bells ==
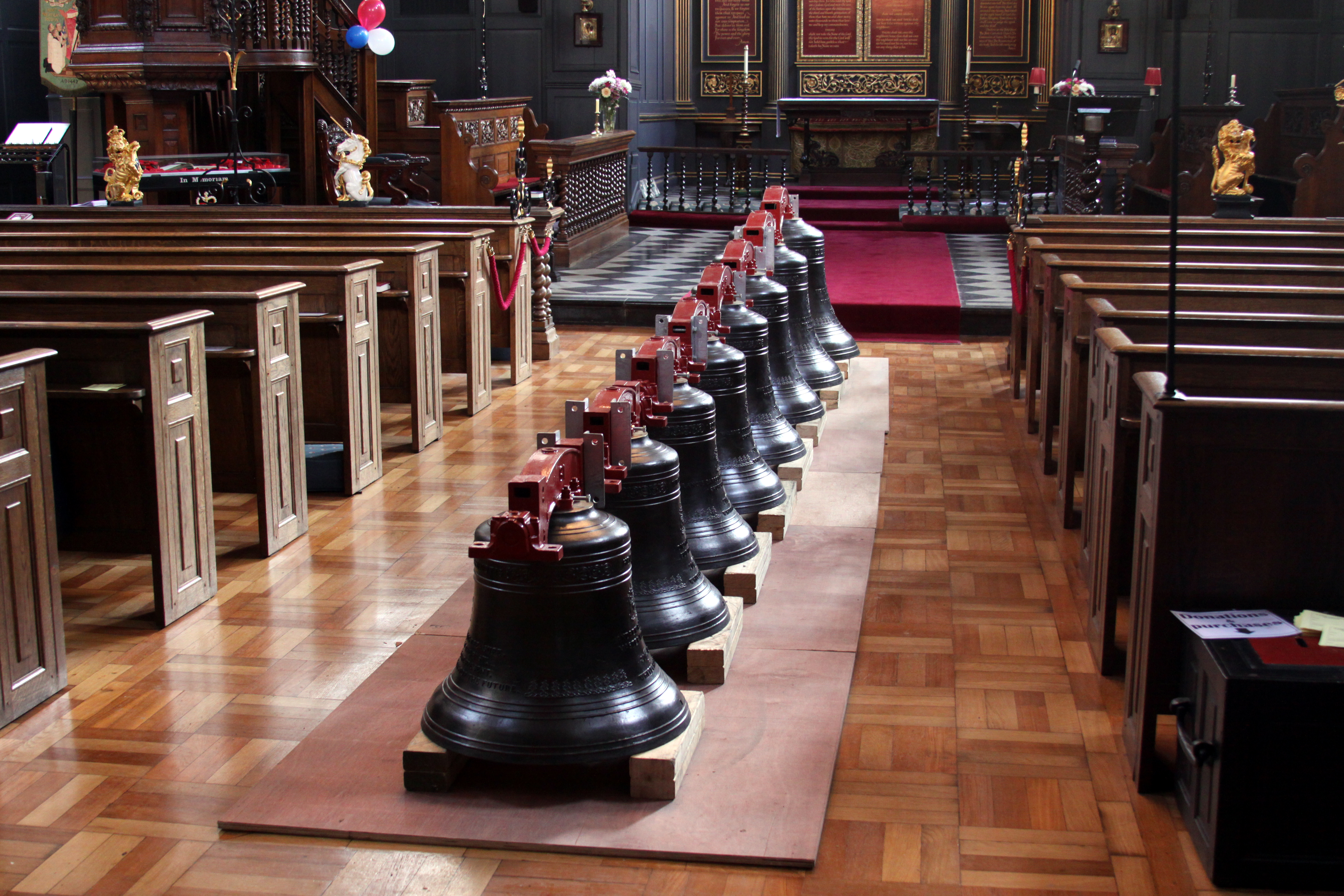
The Royal Jubilee Bells arranged down the aisle of St James Garlickhythe

The project was conceived and run by Dickon Love, who had earlier installed new bells in the other City of London churches of St Dunstan-in-the-West (in 2012) and St Magnus the Martyr (in 2008). The bells were cast by the Whitechapel Bell Foundry in 2012. Bells 2, 7 and 8 were cast on 17 February with the remainder on 9 March. The casting of the bells, especially the largest bell, was extensively covered by the media.

The funds to pay for the new bells and their hanging at the church was raised by Alderman Dr Andrew Parmley, Parish Clerk. Bells were sponsored by the Vintners’ Company, the Dyers’ Company, the Glass-Sellers’ Company, Charles Bettinson, Joanna Warrand, Tony Stockwell and Tony Kassimiotis, Andrew and Wendy Parmley. Each of the sponsors chose an inscription including a dedication on each bell. Each also displays the Royal Arms (by permission of Buckingham Palace) and the name of a senior member of the Royal Family.

On 11 Jan 2012, the bells were granted the title “Royal Jubilee Bells” by Buckingham Palace, on advice from the Deputy Prime Minister and the Minister for Political and Constitutional Reform.

The largest bell weighs 9 long hundredweight, 1 quarter and 25 pounds (481 kg) and sounds the note G sharp. (Bellringers normally calibrate bells in terms of hundredweight.) The remaining bells form the major scale in G sharp. Details are as follows:

Bell	Title	Name	Diameter (inches)	Diameter (cm)	Weight (cwt-qtr-lb)	Weight (kg)	Note
Tenor	The Vintners' Bell	Elizabeth	37 in	94	9-1-25	481	G sharp
7th	The Dyers' Bell	Philip	33 1/4 in	84	7-0-12	361	A sharp
6th	The Glass Sellers' Bell	Charles	30 1/4 in	77	5-1-22	277	B sharp
5th	The Parish Bell	Anne	29 1/4 in	74	4-2-11	234	C sharp
4th	The Bettinson Bell	Andrew	27 1/4 in	69	4-0-11	208	D sharp
3rd	The Crace Bell	Edward	25 3/8 in	64	3-2-2	179	E sharp
2nd	Katherine	William	24 1/4 in	62	3-1-8	169	F double sharp
Treble	Nicole Marie Kassimiotis	Henry	23 5/8 in	60	3-0-21	162	G sharp

== Thames Diamond Jubilee Pageant ==
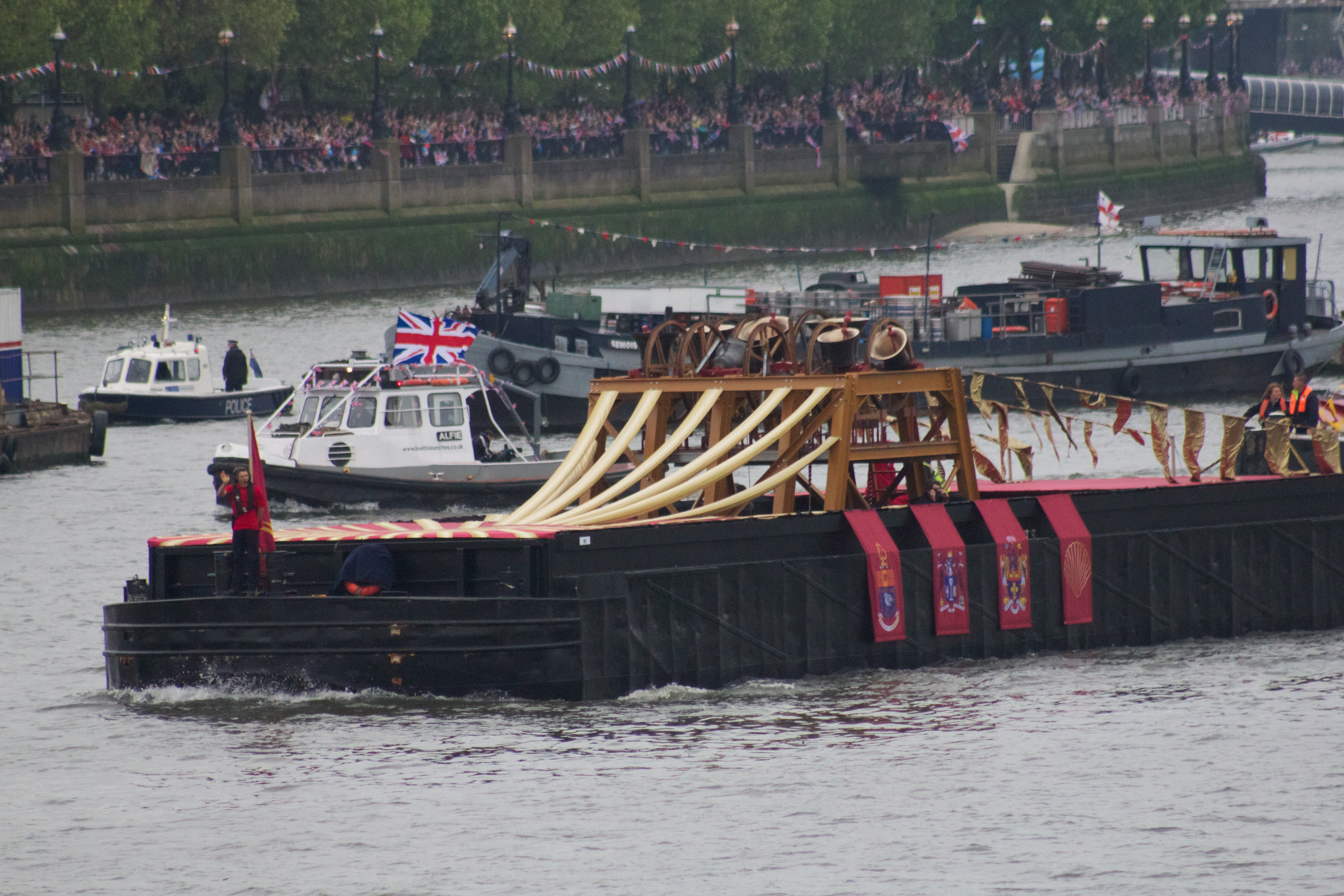
Ursula Katherine carrying the bells on the Diamond Jubilee pageant.

A 6m high tower and frame made of cast iron and steel was designed and first erected in a warehouse in Fircroft Way, Edenbridge, Kent. Following a visit by The Prince of Wales to view the bells at the Whitechapel Bell Foundry on 15 May, the bells were hung in the new frame and a test ring took place on 17 May. The tower was then dismantled and taken to Denton Wharf near Gravesend where it was re-erected on the quayside and hoisted into the vessel “Ursula Katherine” on 24 May.

A band of nine ringers from the Ancient Society of College Youths, led by Dickon Love, met on 26 May to test the bells on the river. This was the first time that bells such as these were ever rung to changes on a river, and while the motion of the boat and action of the wind presented difficulties, the band was able to ring a full peal comprising 5056 changes in the method Cambridge Surprise Major, taking 3 hours 6 minutes.

The Thames Diamond Jubilee Pageant was held on 3 June. It officially started at Albert Bridge with the ringing of the treble bell from the Ursula Katherine, which moved into the centre of the Thames to lead the 1,000 vessel flotilla. A quarter peal was rung of 1250 Cambridge Surprise Major, taking 48 minutes, after which other pieces of change ringing were performed.

Limited coverage was provided by the BBC which had a cameraman on the Ursula Katherine. This coverage was presented by John Barrowman, who had earlier been given bell handling lessons by Dickon Love at St Magnus the Martyr in the previous few weeks. John briefly rang one of the bells with Dickon as the barge passed near London Bridge.

== St James Garlickhythe ==
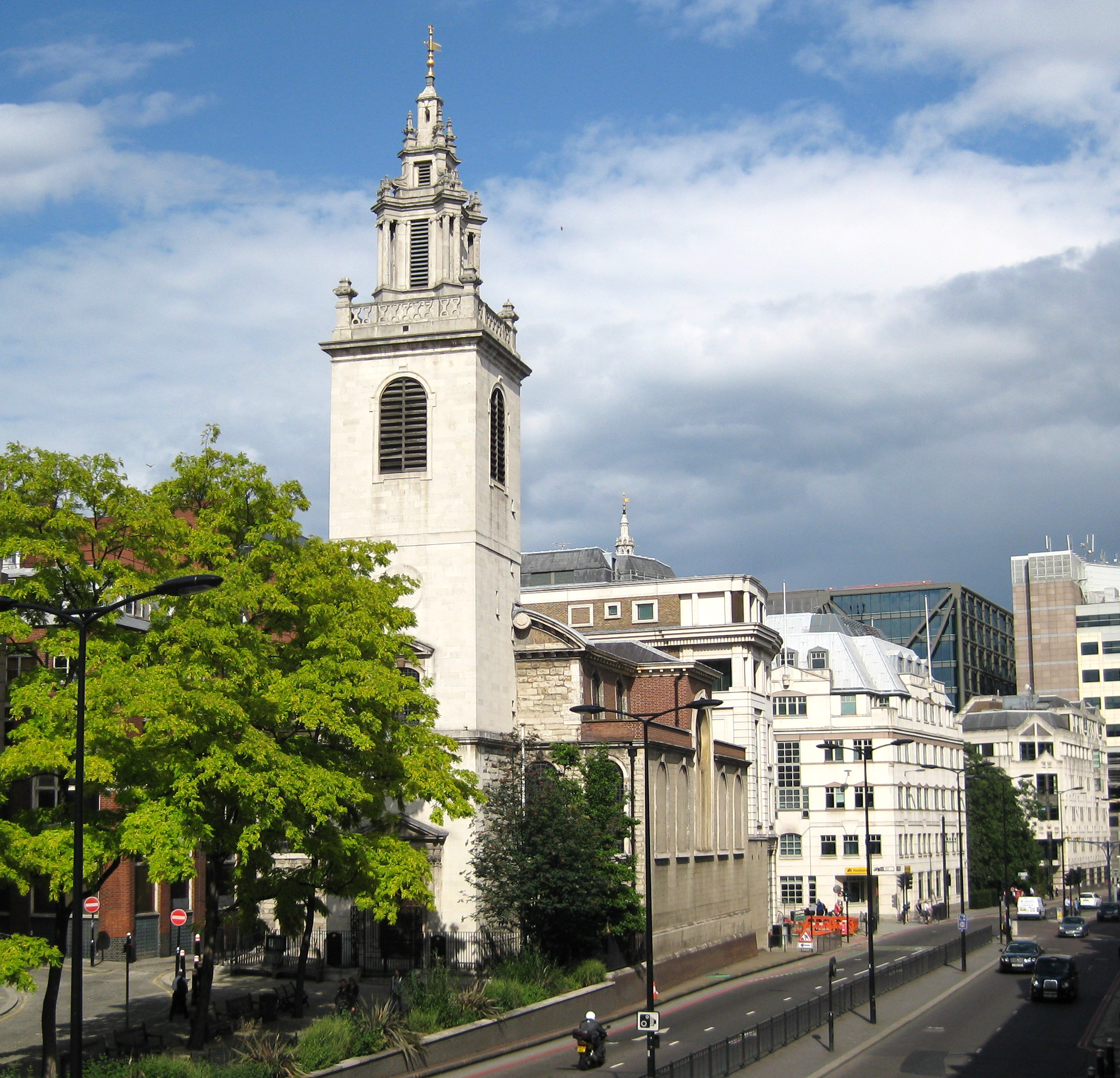
The parish church of St James Garlickhythe in the City of London

The bells and tower were dismantled on 6 June. During the previous three months, a new ringing room was constructed in the tower of St James Garlickhythe and a new bellframe was installed. The bells were delivered to the church on 15 June and arranged along the central aisle. They were dedicated by the Rt Revd John Waine on Sunday 17 June, and hanging commenced in the tower shortly thereafter. They were rung for the first time in the church on 4 July. The first quarter peal was rung in the tower on 22 July after a service where their ringing was dedicated, and the first peal was rung on 25 July, comprising 5152 changes of Jubilee Surprise Major in 2 hours 56 minutes.

== See also ==
- Church bell
