= Bust of Bernardo O'Higgins =

Bust of Bernardo O'Higgins may refer to:

- Bust of Bernardo O'Higgins (Houston)
- Bust of Bernardo O'Higgins (Richmond)
- Bust of Bernardo O'Higgins (Washington, D.C.)
