= Luton Peace Day Riots =

1919 riots in Luton, England

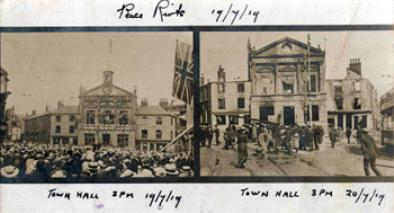
- Town Hall is burnt down
- Date: 19 July 1919
- Location: Luton, Bedfordshire, England
- Injuries: Dozens wounded; 39 people were arrested

The Luton Peace Day Riots occurred over three days from 19 to 21 July 1919. Servicemen angry at the lavish spending for the Peace Day parade held in London on 19 July, following the end of the First World War, protested that the money should be spent on re-integrating soldiers returning from the war.

== Riot ==
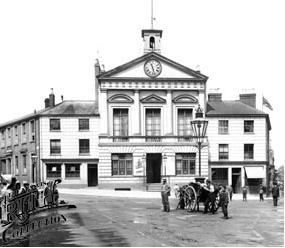
The Town Hall in 1897, from George Street, Luton

On Peace Day, 19 July 1919, the Luton Town Hall was burnt down during a riot by ex-servicemen unhappy with unemployment and other grievances. The riot started after members of the council arrived to read out the proclamation of peace, and many in the crowd expressed their disapproval. One issue was a discharged sailors and soldiers group not being permitted to use Wardown Park to hold a drumhead memorial service. Tension boiled over into violence, and after a number of clashes, many protesters broke through the police line and forcibly entered the town hall, which was eventually set on fire.

Order was eventually restored to the town by midnight on 19 July, but the fire brigade were unable to extinguish the fire, and by the next morning the town hall was little more than a ruin. The remains of the building were demolished in August 1919 and in 1922 the war memorial, designed by Sir Reginald Blomfield, inscribed with the names of 1,286 dead from the Great War, was unveiled.

== Aftermath ==
Many of those arrested received serious sentences. John Henry Good who took part in the riots was sentenced to six weeks of hard labour.

In 2019, to commemorate the centenary of the 1919 Peace Riots, Cultural Histories Community Interest Company, working with a number of partner organisations, individuals and local community groups in Luton, developed a range of projects to promote awareness and interest in the 1919 Peace Days riots via a programme of learning and the performing arts. The projects included collecting personal and family recollections of the Peace Riots, plus art and music projects to promote local awareness of the event.
