= State Barge of Charles II =

Royal Barge

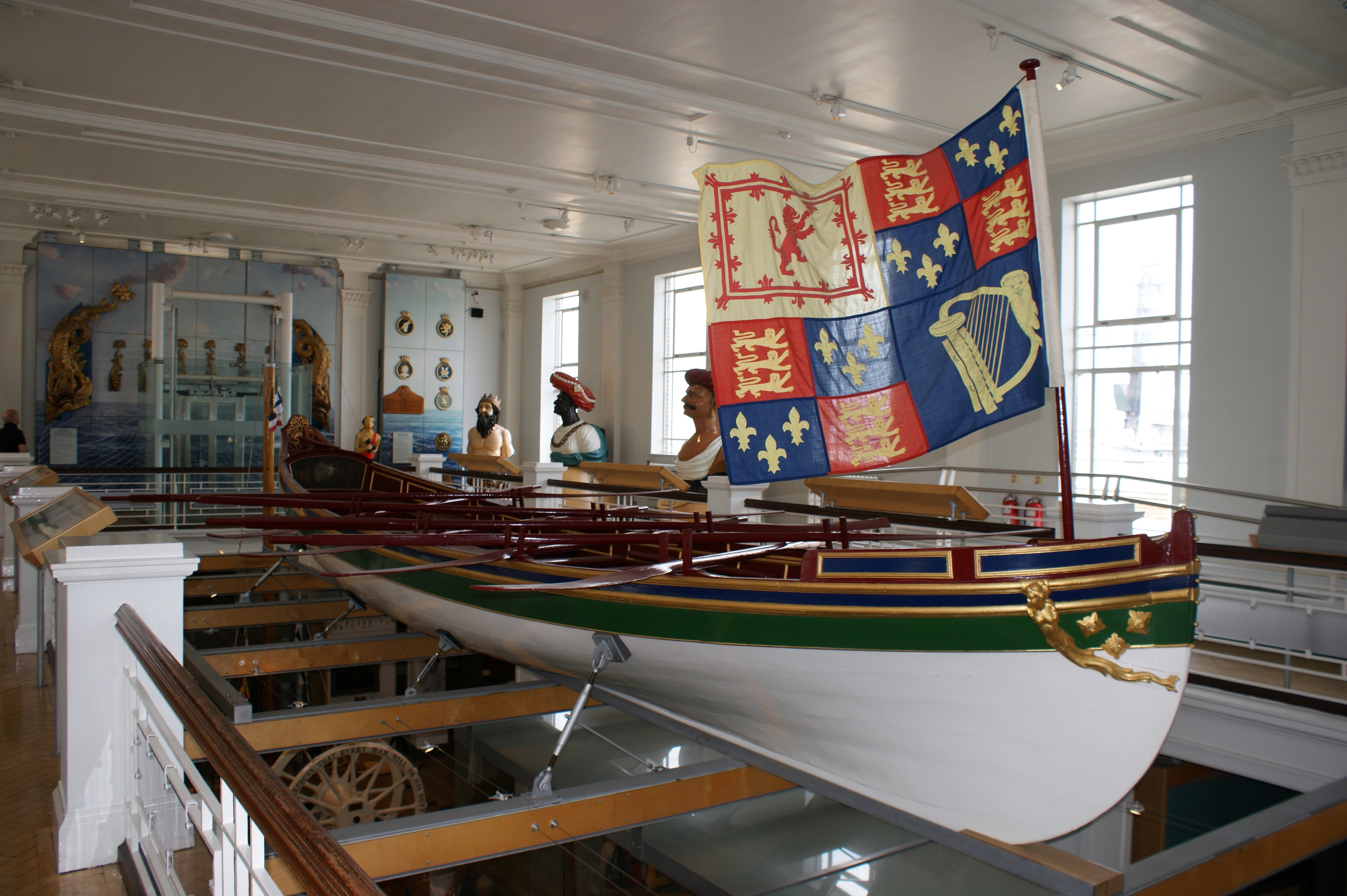
The barge at the National Museum of the Royal Navy

The State Barge of Charles II is a 35-foot-long (11 m) British royal barge constructed around 1670 for the use of Charles II, for events now known as fleet reviews. In January 1806 it was used to carry the coffin of Lord Nelson to St Paul's Cathedral for his state funeral. By about 1870 it was on display on HMS Victory, where it remained until the 1920s when it was removed during Victory's restoration. It is currently kept in the National Museum of the Royal Navy in Portsmouth.

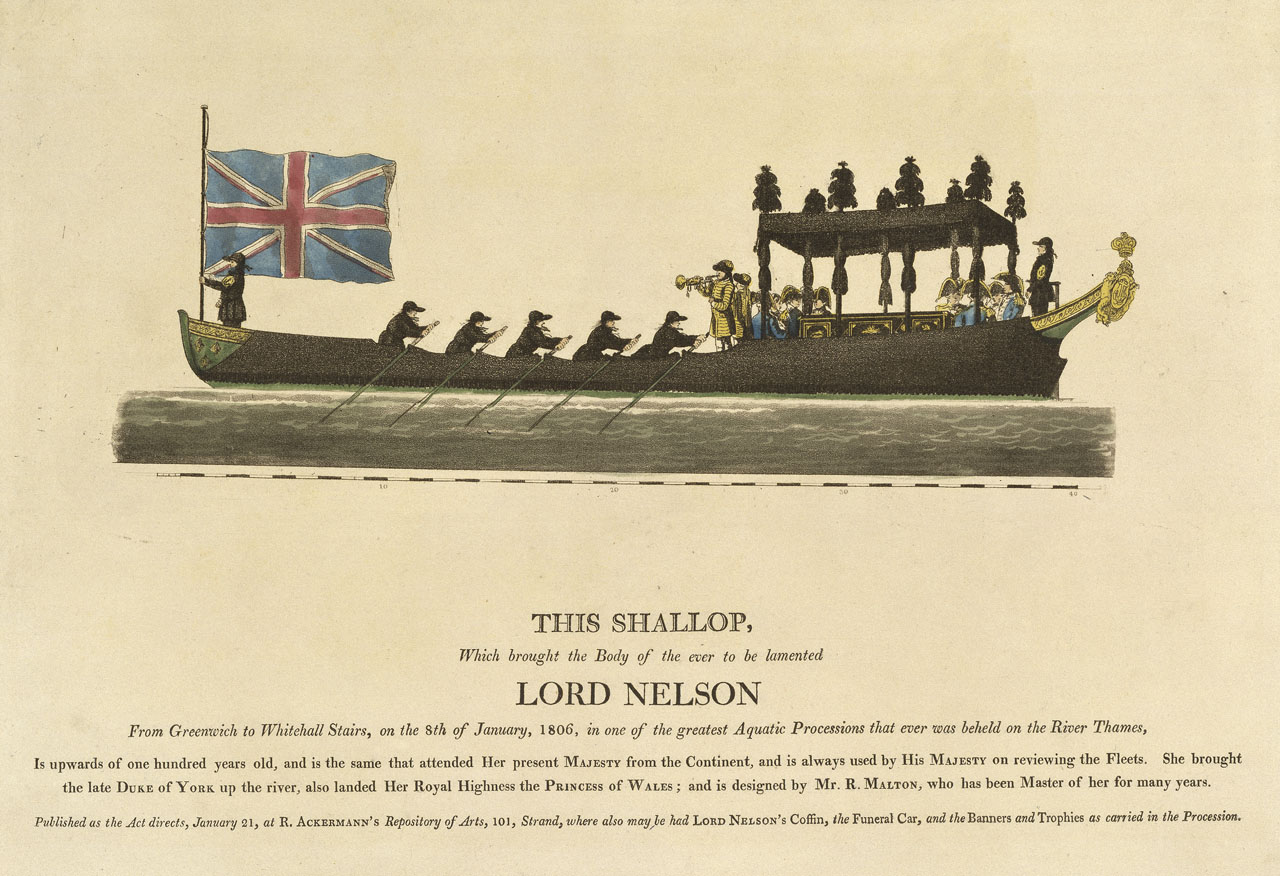
A contemporary print depicting the State Barge carrying the body of Lord Nelson in 1806.

== Design ==
The barge is a type of boat known as a shallop; it has a rounded bow and a square-shaped stern (known as a lute stern). It has rowlocks for five oars on each side. The stern has a portrait of the Duchess of Portsmouth, Louise de Kerouaille, a mistress of Charles II.

== See also ==
- Queen Mary's Shallop
- Prince Frederick's Barge
- Gloriana
