= Richmond Bridge, London =

18th-century stone arch bridge in London, England

Richmond Bridge
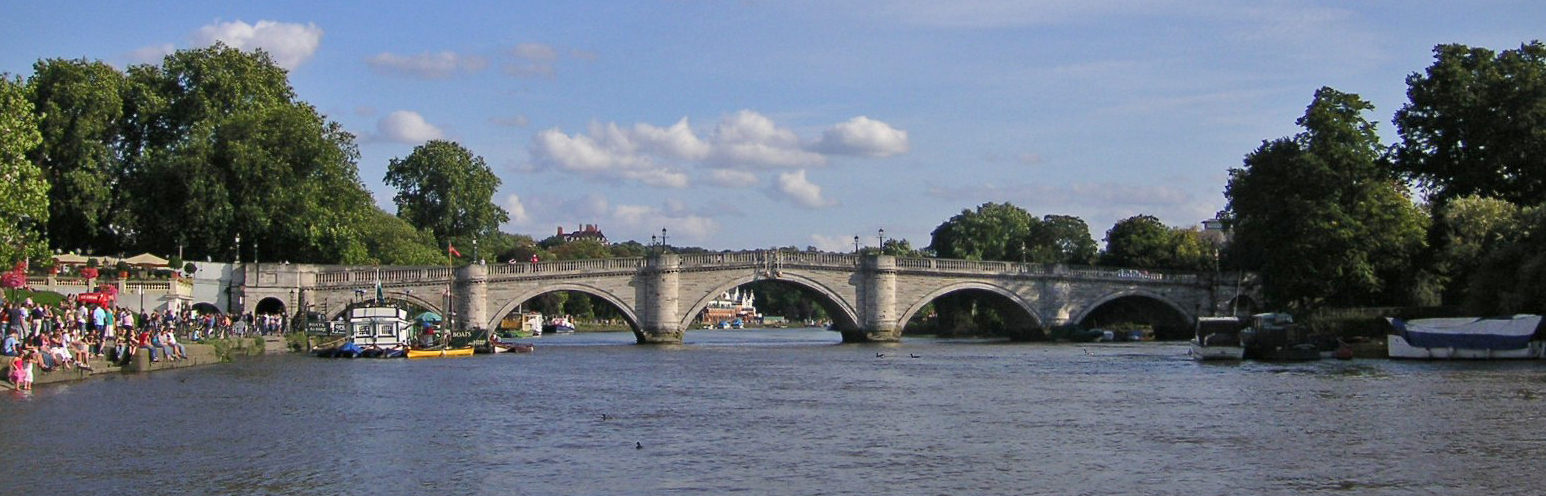
- Coordinates: 51.45725°N 0.30732°W
- Carries: A305 road
- Crosses: River Thames
- Locale: Richmond, London; Twickenham
- Maintained by: Richmond upon Thames London Borough Council

Characteristics
- Design: Stone arch bridge
- Material: Portland stone
- Total length: 300 feet (91 m)
- Width: 36 feet (11 m)
- No. of spans: 5
- Piers in water: 4
- Clearance below: 26 feet (7.9 m) at lowest astronomical tide

History
- Designer: James Paine, Kenton Couse
- Opened: 1777; 248 years ago

Statistics
- Daily traffic: 34,484 vehicles (2004)

Listed Building – Grade I
- Official name: Richmond Bridge
- Designated: 2 September 1952; 73 years ago
- Reference no.: 1180951

Location
- Interactive map of Richmond Bridge

Richmond Bridge is an 18th-century stone arch bridge that crosses the River Thames at Richmond, connecting the two halves of the present-day London Borough of Richmond upon Thames. It was designed by James Paine and Kenton Couse.

The bridge, which is Grade I listed, was built between 1774 and 1777, as a replacement for a ferry crossing which connected Richmond town centre on the east bank with its neighbouring district of East Twickenham to the west. Its construction was privately funded by a tontine scheme, for which tolls were charged until 1859. Because the river meanders from its general west to east direction, flowing from southeast to northwest in this part of London, what would otherwise be known as the north and south banks are often referred to as the "Middlesex" (Twickenham) and "Surrey" (Richmond) banks respectively, named after the historic counties to which each side once belonged.

The bridge was widened and slightly flattened in 1937–40, but otherwise still conforms to its original design. The eighth Thames bridge to be built in what is now Greater London, it is today the oldest surviving Thames bridge in London.

== Background ==
The small town of Sheen on the Surrey bank of the Thames, 10 miles (16 km) west of the City of London or 16 miles (26 km) by river, had been the site of a royal palace since 1299. After it was destroyed by fire in 1497, Henry VII built a new palace on the site, naming it Richmond Palace after his historic title of Earl of Richmond, and the central part of Sheen became known as Richmond.

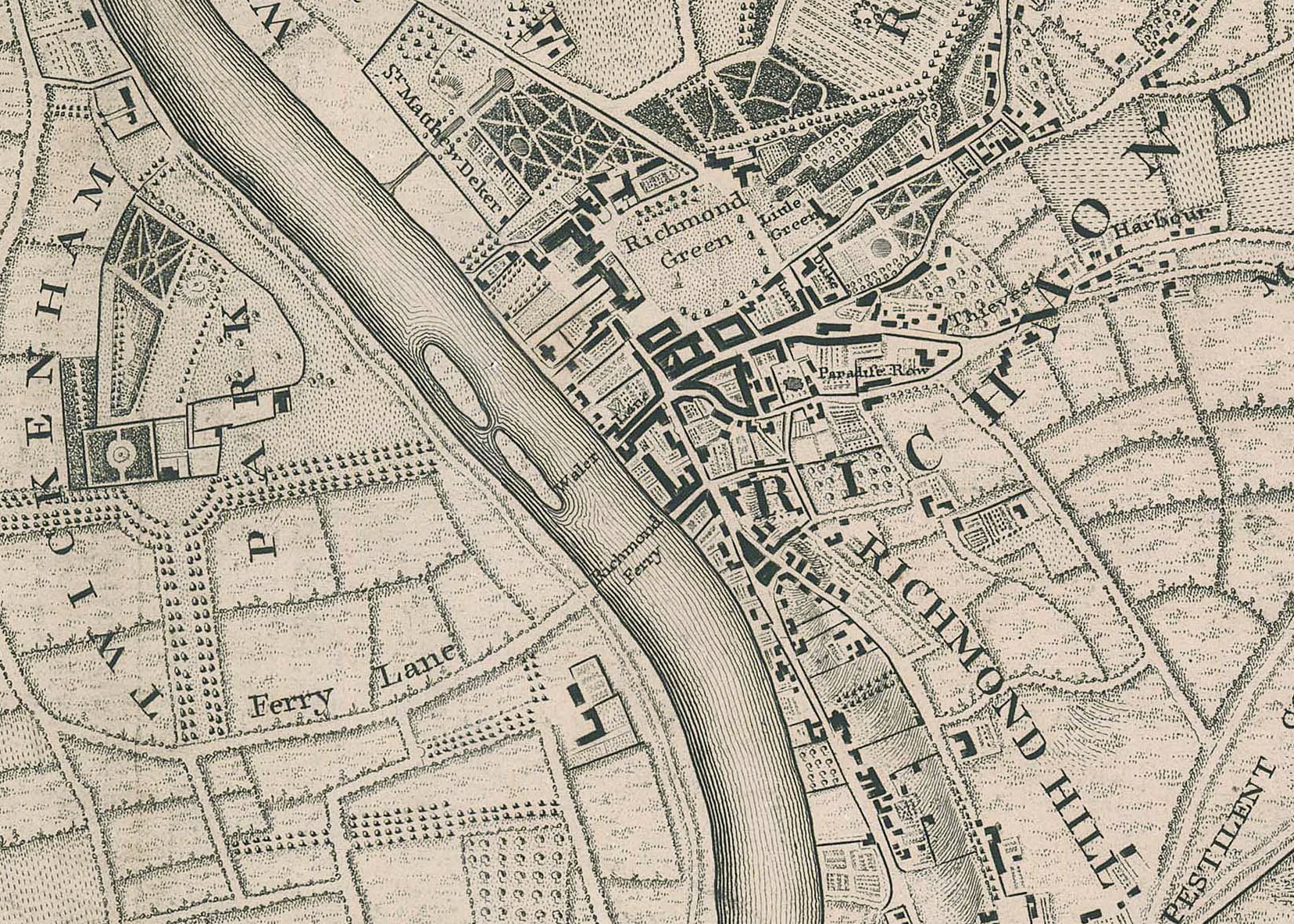
Richmond, Twickenham Park and the route of the Richmond Ferry in 1746

Although a ferry had almost certainly existed at the site of the present-day bridge since Norman times, the earliest known crossing of the river at Richmond dates from 1439. The service was owned by the Crown, and operated by two boats, a small skiff for the transport of passengers and a larger boat for horses and small carts; the Twickenham Ferry, slightly upstream, was also in service from at least 1652. However, due to the steepness of the hill leading to the shore-line on the Surrey side neither ferry service was able to transport carriages or heavily laden carts, forcing them to make a very lengthy detour via Kingston Bridge.

In the 18th century Richmond and neighbouring Twickenham on the opposite bank of the Thames, both of which were distant from London but enjoyed efficient transport links to the city via the river, became extremely fashionable, and their populations began to grow rapidly. As the ferry was unable to handle large loads and was often cancelled due to weather conditions, the river crossing became a major traffic bottleneck.

Local resident William Windham had been sub-tutor to Prince William, Duke of Cumberland, and was the former husband of Mary, Lady Deloraine, mistress to George II. As a reward for his services, George II leased Windham the right to operate the ferry until 1798. Windham sub-let the right to operate the ferry to local resident Henry Holland. With the ferry unable to serve the demands of the area, in 1772 Windham sought parliamentary approval to replace the ferry with a wooden bridge, to be paid for by tolls.

== Design ==
The plans for a wooden bridge proved unpopular, and the Richmond Bridge Act 1773 (13 Geo. 3. c. 83) was passed by Parliament, selecting 90 commissioners, including landscape architect Lancelot "Capability" Brown, historian and politician Horace Walpole and playwright and actor David Garrick, to oversee the construction of a stone bridge on the site of the ferry. The act stipulated that no tax of any sort could be used to finance the bridge, and fixed a scale of tolls, ranging from ½d for a pedestrian to 2s 6d for a coach drawn by six horses (about 50p and £20 respectively in 2023). Henry Holland was granted £5,350 (about £858,700 in 2023) compensation for the loss of the ferry service. The commission appointed James Paine and Kenton Couse to design and build the new bridge.

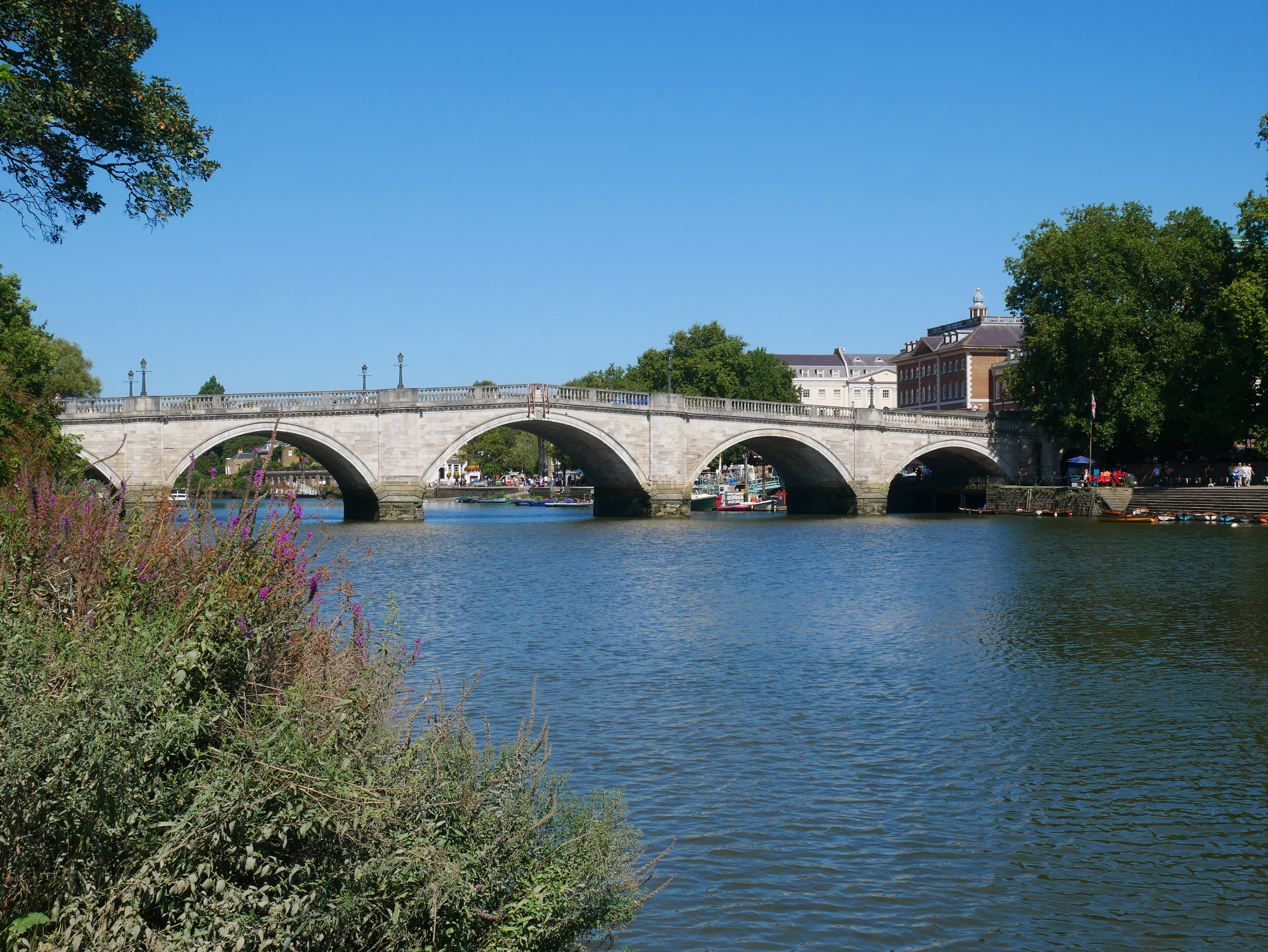
South face of Richmond Bridge, as seen from the west bank

The act specified that the bridge was to be built on the site of the existing ferry "or as much lower down the river as the Commission can settle". Local residents lobbied for it to be built at Water Lane, a short distance downstream from the ferry site. The approach to the river was relatively flat, avoiding the steep slope to the existing ferry pier on the Surrey bank. However, the Dowager Duchess of Newcastle refused to allow the approach road on the Middlesex bank to pass through her land at Twickenham Park, and the commission was forced to build on the site of the ferry, despite a steep 1 in 16 (6.25%) incline.

The bridge was designed as a stone arch bridge of 300 feet (91 m) in length and 24 feet 9 inches (7.54 m) in width, supported by five elliptical arches of varying heights. The tall 60-foot (18 m) wide central span was designed to allow shipping to pass, giving Richmond Bridge a distinctive humpbacked appearance. It was built in Portland stone, and ran between Ferry Hill (Bridge Street today) on the Surrey side and Richmond Road on the Middlesex side; sharp curves in the approach roads on the Middlesex side (still in existence today) were needed to avoid the Dowager Duchess of Newcastle's land at Twickenham Park. Palladian toll houses were built in alcoves at each end.

== Construction ==
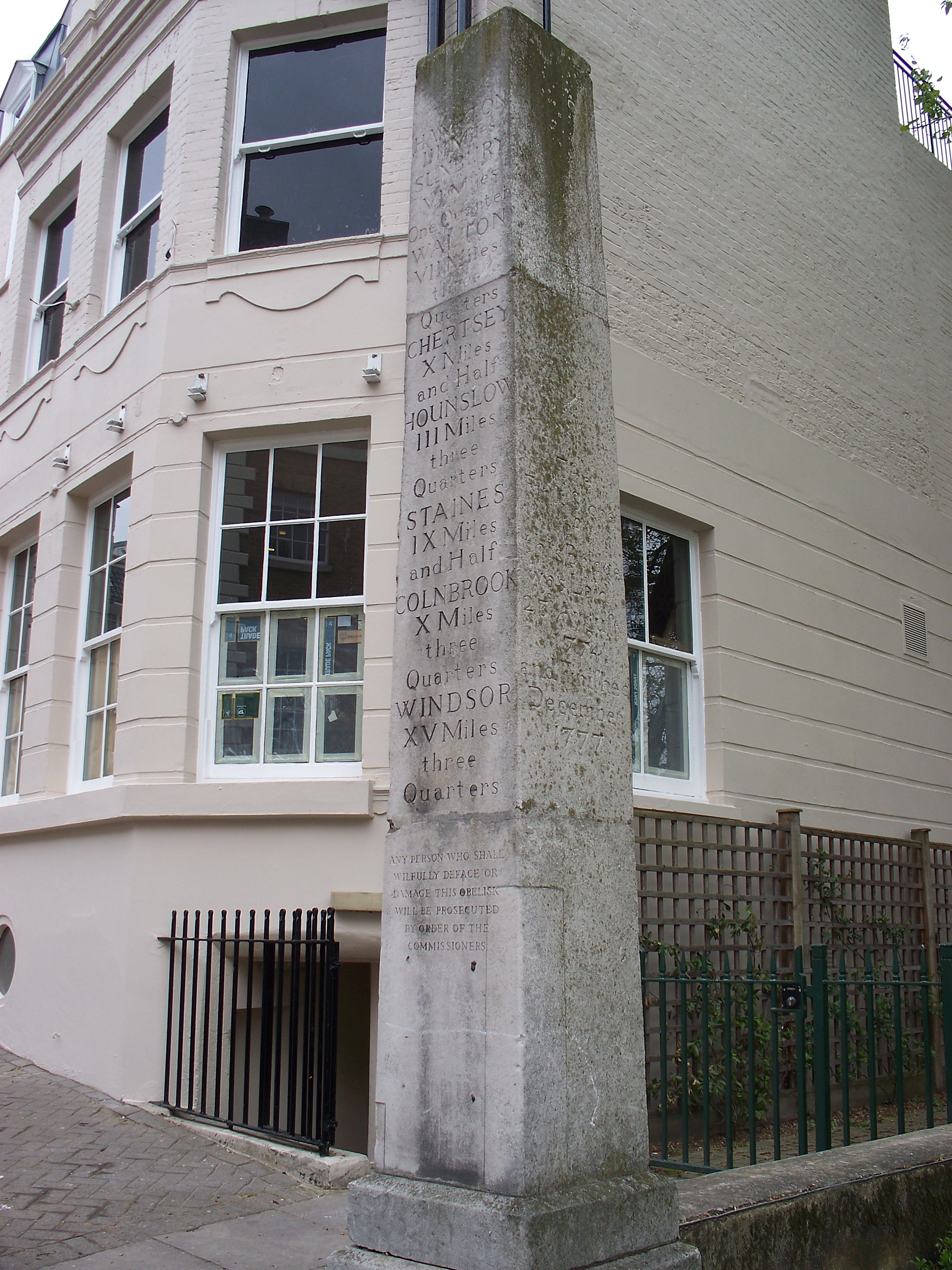
The milestone at the Surrey end of the bridge

The building was put out to tender, and on 16 May 1774 Thomas Kerr was awarded the contract to build the bridge for the sum of £10,900 (about £1.73 million in 2023). With additional costs, such as compensating landowners and building new approach roads, total costs came to approximately £26,000 (about £4.17 million in 2023).

Most of the money needed was raised from the sale of shares at £100 each (approximately £16,100 in 2023) in two tontine schemes, the first for £20,000 and the second for £5,000. The first was appropriately called the Richmond-Bridge Tontine, but when it became clear that the initial £20,000 would not be sufficient to complete construction a second tontine was set up. Each investor was guaranteed a return of 4% per annum, so £1,000 per annum from the income raised from tolls was divided amongst the investors in the two tontines. On the death of a shareholder their share of the dividend was divided among the surviving shareholders. To avoid fraud, each investor was obliged to sign an affidavit that they were alive before receiving their dividend. (Note: The tontine shares were transferable, although the payment of the dividend relied on the survival of the original investor.) Any revenue over the £1,000 per annum required to pay the investors was held in a general fund for the maintenance of the bridge.

Construction began on 23 August 1774. The Prince of Wales was invited to lay the first stone but declined, and so the stone was laid by commission member Henry Hobart. The bridge opened to pedestrians in September 1776 and to other traffic on 12 January 1777, at which time the ferry service was closed, although work on the bridge was not completed until December 1777. A large milestone was placed at the Richmond end, giving the distances to other bridges and to local towns.

== Operation ==
There was no formal opening ceremony, and little initial recorded public reaction. However, the bridge soon became much admired for its design; an article in The London Magazine in 1779 said that the bridge was "a simple, yet elegant structure, and, from its happy situation, is ... one of the most beautiful ornaments of the river ... from whatever point of view the bridge is beheld, it presents the spectator with one of the richest landscapes nature and art ever produced by their joint efforts, and connoisseurs in painting will instantly be reminded of some of the best performances of Claude Lorraine". James Paine proudly illustrated it among the designs in the second volume of his Plans, Elevations, and Sections of Noblemen and Gentlemen's Houses, 1783. Richmond Bridge was the subject of paintings by many leading artists, including Thomas Rowlandson, John Constable and local resident J. M. W. Turner.

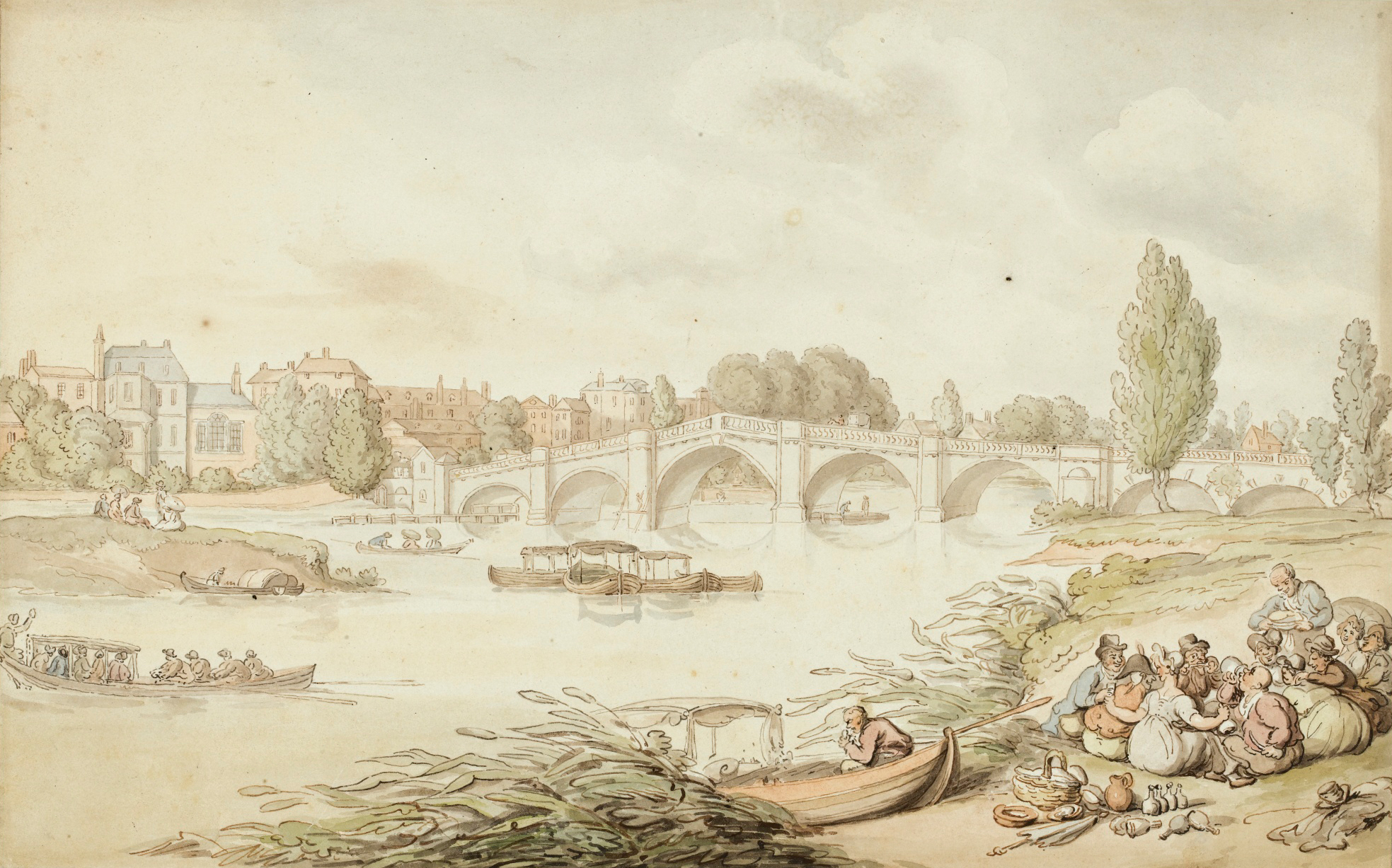
Richmond Bridge by Thomas Rowlandson, c. 1810

Severe penalties were imposed for vandalising the bridge. The Richmond Bridge Act 1773 specified that the punishment for "willful or malicious damage" to the bridge should be "transportation to one of His Majesty's Colonies in America for the space of seven years". A warning against damage can still be seen on the milestone at the Surrey end of the bridge.

Richmond Bridge was a commercial success, generating £1,300 per annum in tolls (about £116,510 in 2023) in 1810. By 1822, the company had accumulated a sufficient surplus that all vehicle tolls were reduced to one penny.

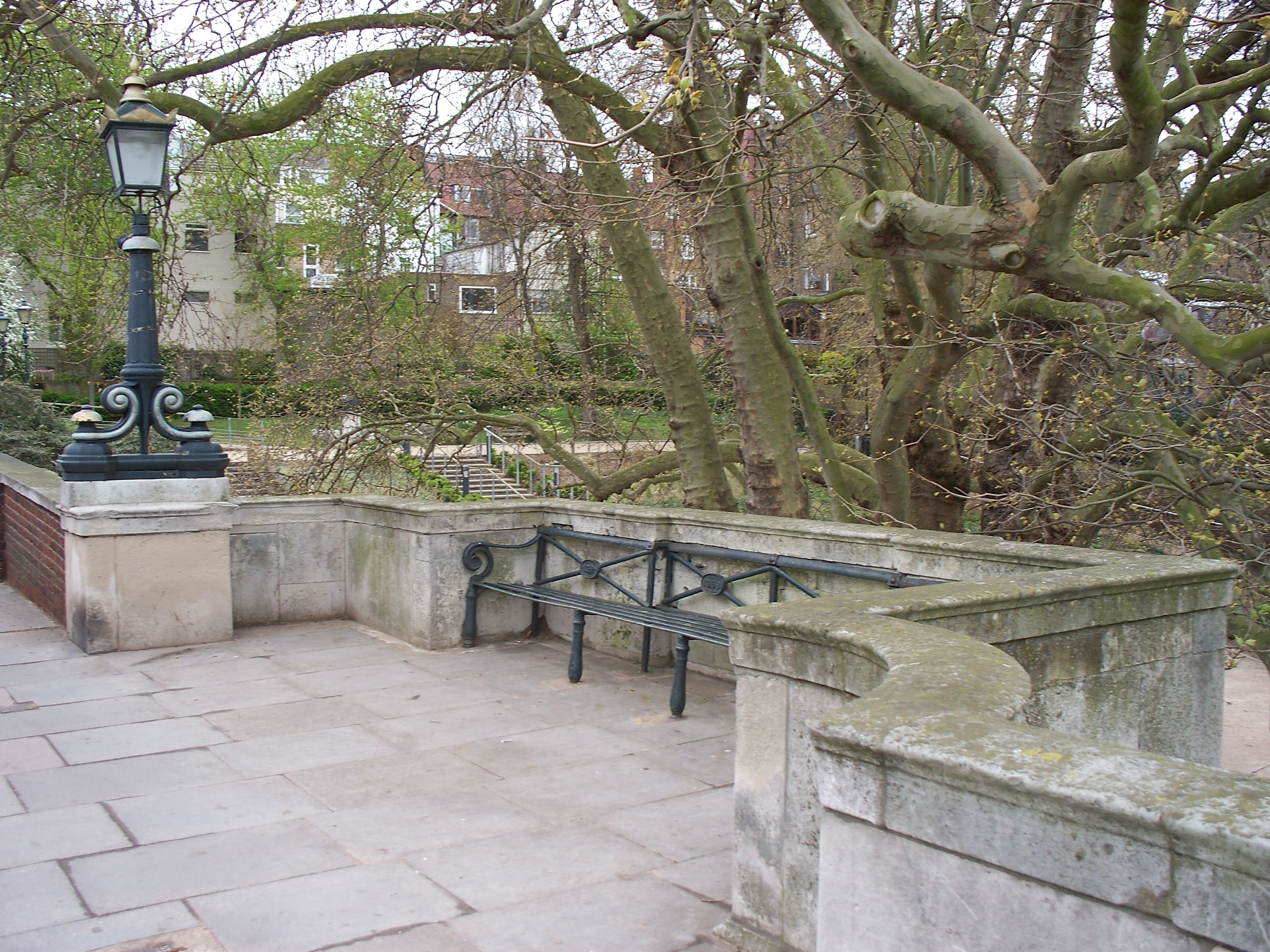
Alcove on the site of a former tollbooth

On 10 March 1859 the last subscriber to the main tontine died, having for over five years received the full £800 per annum set aside for subscribers to the first tontine, and with the death of its last member the scheme expired. (Note: The smaller second tontine continued until the death of its last shareholder in 1865, paying a total of £200 per annum; for the last six years this was paid from the accumulated toll revenues of previous years.) On 25 March 1859 Richmond Bridge became toll-free. A large procession made its way to the bridge, where a team of labourers symbolically removed toll gates from their hinges. The toll houses were demolished, replaced by seating in 1868; investment income from the revenue accumulated during the 83 years the tolls had been charged was sufficient to pay for the bridge's maintenance.

In 1846 the first railway line reached Richmond. Richmond gasworks opened in 1848, and Richmond began to develop into a significant town. The District Railway (later the District line) reached Richmond in 1877, connecting it to the London Underground. Commuting to central London became feasible and affordable, leading to further population growth in the previously relatively isolated Richmond and Twickenham areas.

== 20th-century remodelling ==
By the early 20th century the bridge was proving inadequate for the increasing traffic, particularly with the introduction of motorised transport, and a 10 miles per hour (16 km/h) speed limit was enforced. With the remaining investment income from tolls insufficient to pay for major reconstruction, on 31 March 1931 the bridge was taken into the joint public ownership of Surrey and Middlesex councils, and proposals were made to widen it. The plans were strongly opposed on aesthetic grounds, and the decision was taken to build instead a new bridge a short distance downstream to relieve traffic pressure.

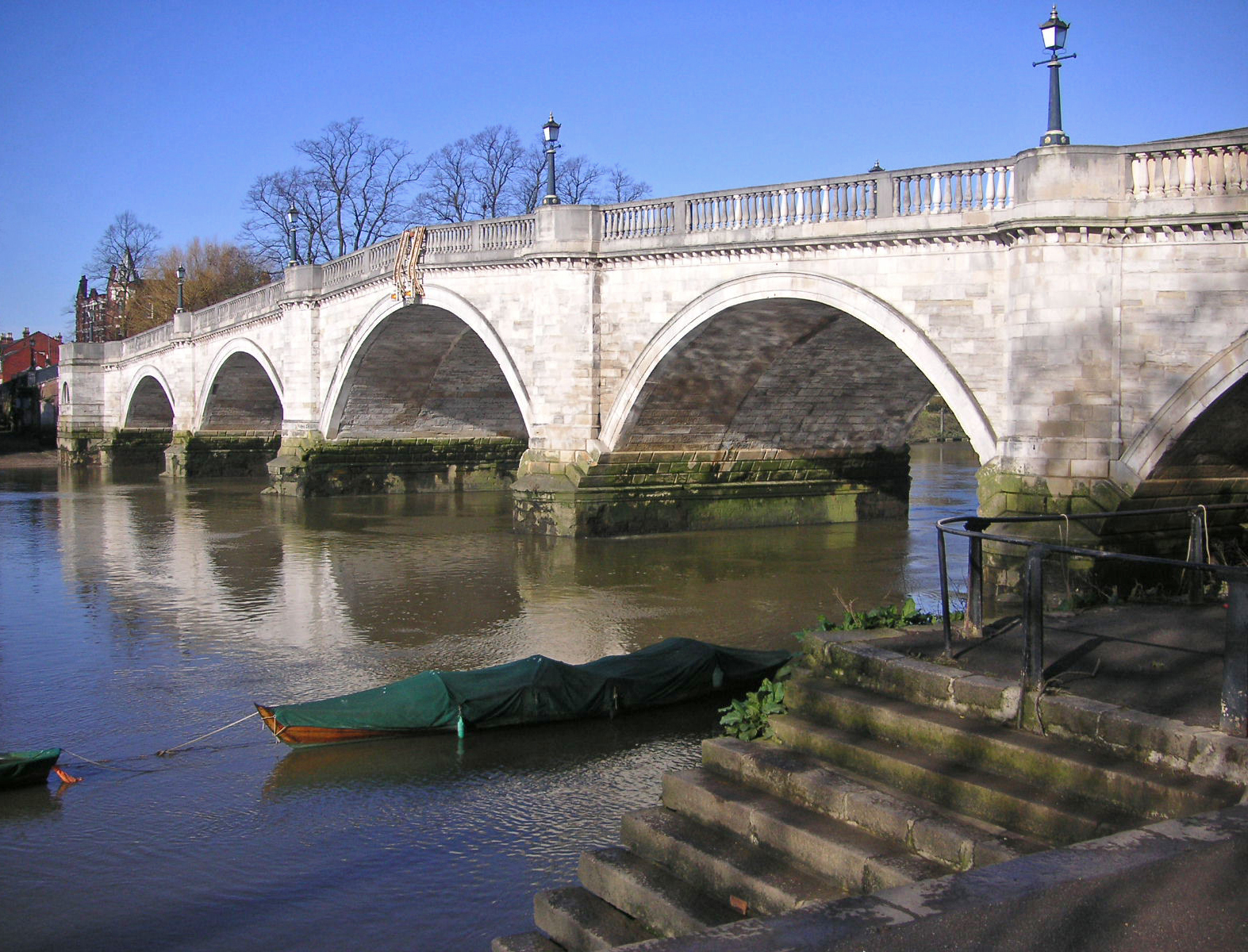
The join between the narrow 1770s structure and the paler 1930s widening is clearly visible under the bridge arches

The new Twickenham Bridge opened in 1933, but Richmond Bridge was still unable to handle the volume of traffic, so in 1933 Sir Harley Dalrymple-Hay proposed possible methods for widening the bridge without significantly affecting its appearance. The cheapest of Dalrymple-Hay's proposals, to transfer the footpaths onto stone corbels projecting from the sides of the bridge thus freeing the entire width for vehicle traffic, was rejected on aesthetic grounds, and a proposal to widen the bridge on both sides was rejected as impractical. A proposal to widen the bridge on the upstream side was settled on as causing the least disruption to nearby buildings, and in 1934 it was decided to widen the bridge by 11 feet (3.4 m), at a cost of £73,000 (about £6.55 million in 2023).

The Cleveland Bridge & Engineering Company of Darlington was appointed to carry out the rebuilding. In 1937 each stone on the upstream side was removed and numbered and the bridge widened; the stone facing of the upstream side was then reassembled and the bridge reopened to traffic in 1940. Throughout the redevelopment, a single lane of traffic was kept open at all times. It was found that the 18th-century foundations, consisting of wooden platforms sunk into the river bed, had largely rotted away, and they were reinforced with steel pilings and concrete foundations. During the widening works the opportunity was also taken to lower slightly the roadbed at the centre of the bridge and raise the access ramps, reducing the humpbacked nature of the bridge's central section.

== Legacy ==
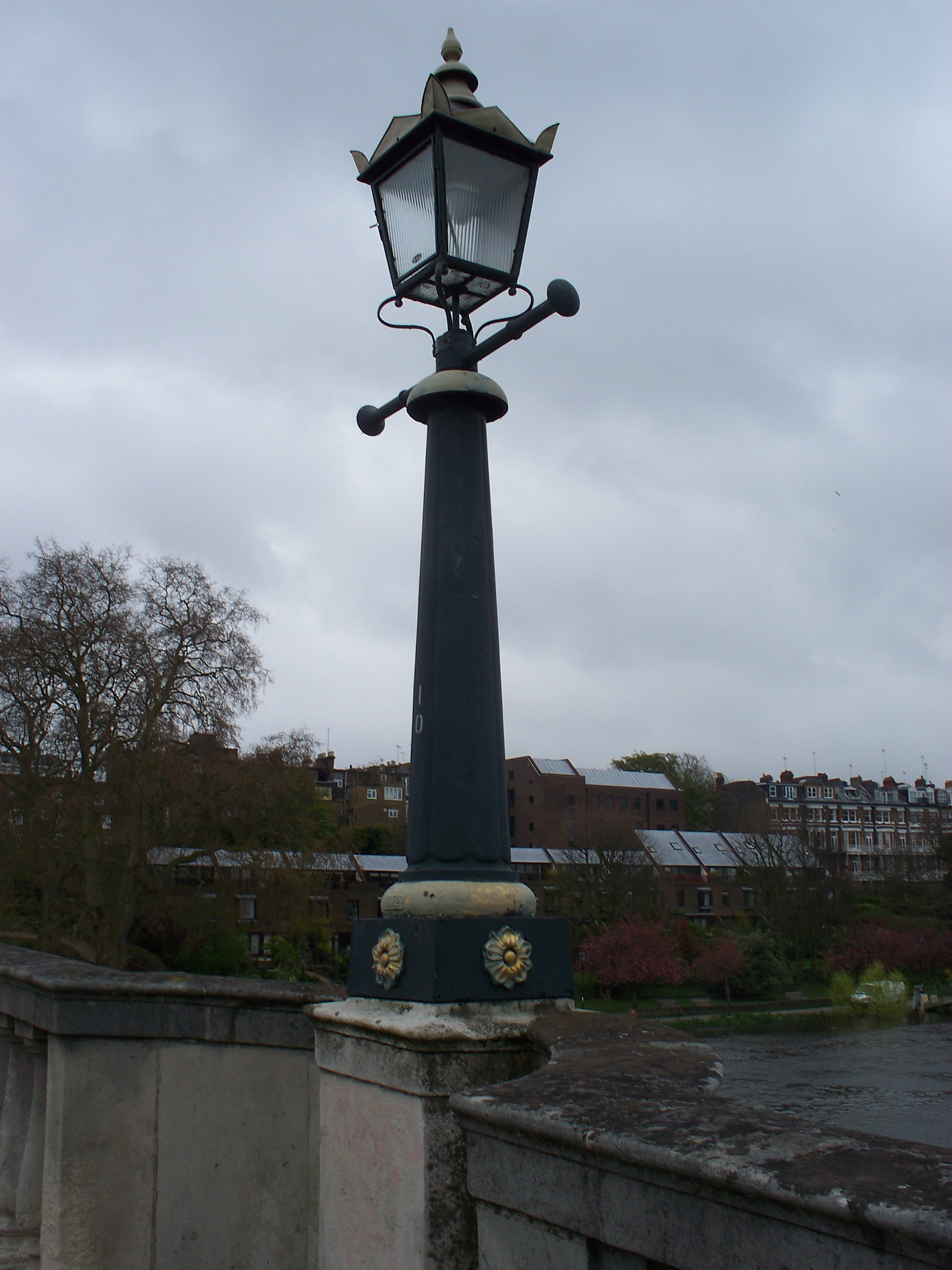
Victorian gas lamp post on Richmond Bridge

James Paine went on to design three other Thames bridges after Richmond, at Chertsey (1783), Kew (1783), and Walton (1788). Paine and Couse renewed their working relationship on the design of Chertsey Bridge, the only one of the three still in existence. Paine became High Sheriff of Surrey in 1783.

In 1962, Richmond Council announced the replacement of the gaslamps on the bridge with electric lighting. The Richmond Society, a local pressure group, protested at the change to the character of the bridge, and succeeded in forcing the council to retain the Victorian gas lamp-posts, converted to electric light, which remain in place today.

In the history of Richmond Bridge there have only been two reported serious collisions between boats and the bridge. On 20 March 1964, three boats tied together at Eel Pie Island, 1 1/2 miles (2.4 km) upstream, broke from their moorings in a storm and were swept downstream, colliding with the bridge. Although no serious damage was caused to the bridge, the Princess Beatrice, an 1896 steamer once used by Gilbert and Sullivan, was damaged beyond repair. On 30 January 1987, the Brave Goose, the £3,500,000 yacht of National Car Parks founder Sir Donald Gosling, became wedged under the central arch of the bridge, eventually being freed at low tide the next day.

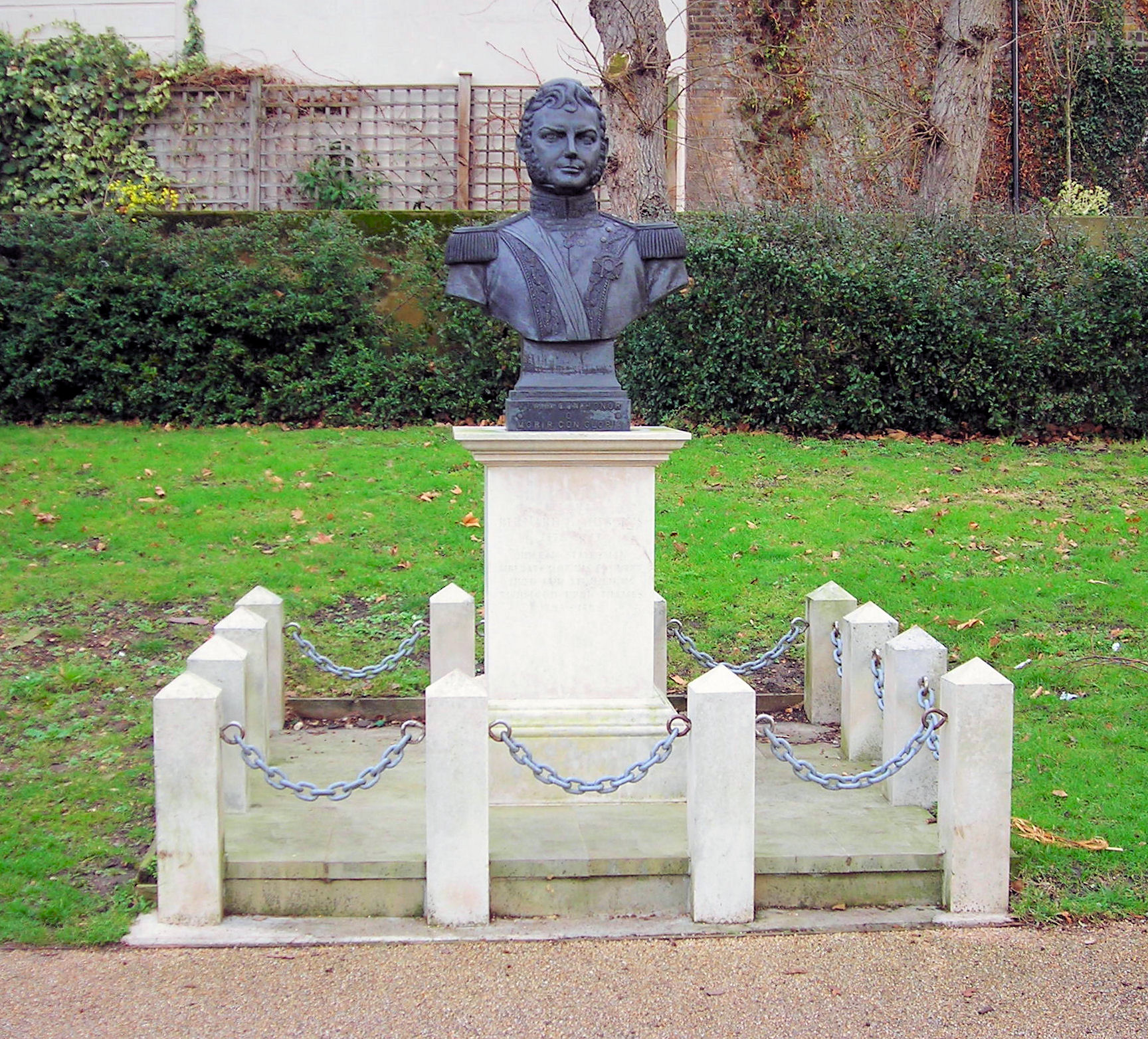
The bust of Bernardo O'Higgins near the bridge

The eighth Thames bridge to be built in what is now Greater London, Richmond Bridge is currently the oldest surviving bridge over the Thames in Greater London, (Note: London Bridge (circa 55 AD), Kingston Bridge (date of construction unrecorded, but renovated in 1193 so dating from the mid-12th century at the latest), Putney Bridge (1729), Westminster Bridge (1739), Hampton Court Bridge (1752), Kew Bridge (1759), Blackfriars Bridge (1769) and Battersea Bridge (1771) predate Richmond Bridge, but have all been demolished and replaced since the construction of Richmond Bridge.) and the oldest Thames bridge between the sea and Abingdon Bridge in Oxfordshire. Richmond Bridge was Grade I listed in 1952 and it is the only Georgian bridge over the Thames in London. Its bicentenary was celebrated on 7 May 1977; the commemoration was held four months after the actual anniversary of 12 January, to avoid poor weather conditions.

The tradition of boat hire, repairs and boatbuilding continues at the bridge and tunnels at Richmond Bridge Boathouses under boatbuilder Mark Edwards, awarded his MBE in 2013 for "services to boatbuilding" including construction of the royal barge Gloriana.

Just to the south of the bridge, in a park at the Richmond end, is a bust of the first president of Chile, Bernardo O'Higgins, who studied in Richmond from 1795 until 1798. In 1998, 200 years after he left Richmond, the bust, whose sculptor is unknown, was unveiled. The patch of ground which the statue overlooks is called "O'Higgins Square". The Mayor of Richmond lays a wreath at the bust every year in the presence of staff from the Chilean Embassy in London.

== See also ==
- List of crossings of the River Thames
- List of bridges in London

== Sources ==
- Cookson, Brian (2006), Crossing the River, Edinburgh: Mainstream, ISBN 978-1-84018-976-6, OCLC 63400905
- Crisp, Richard (1866), Richmond and its Inhabitants From the Olden Time, London: Sampson Low, Son, and Marston, OCLC 4770939
- Demuth, Tim (2003), The Spread of London's Underground, Harrow Weald: Capital Transport, ISBN 978-1-85414-266-5
- Lysons, Daniel; Lysons, Samuel (1810), The Environs of London, London: T. Cadell and W. Davies, OCLC 4675204
- Matthews, Peter (2008), London's Bridges, Oxford: Shire, ISBN 978-0-7478-0679-0, OCLC 213309491
- Milner, William (1839), The Wonders of Nature and Art: Comprising Nearly Three Hundred of the Most Remarkable Curiosities and Phenomena in the Known World, London: William Milner, OCLC 9406884
- Mitchell, Vic; Smith, Keith (1996), Willesden Junction to Richmond, Midhurst: Middleton Press, ISBN 978-1-873793-71-8, OCLC 36121985
- Ruddock, Ted (1979), Arch Bridges and Their Builders 1735–1835, Cambridge: Cambridge University Press, ISBN 978-0-521-21816-0, OCLC 3447021
