= Prince Frederick's Barge =

Royal Barge

Coordinates: 51.481111°N 0.005556°W

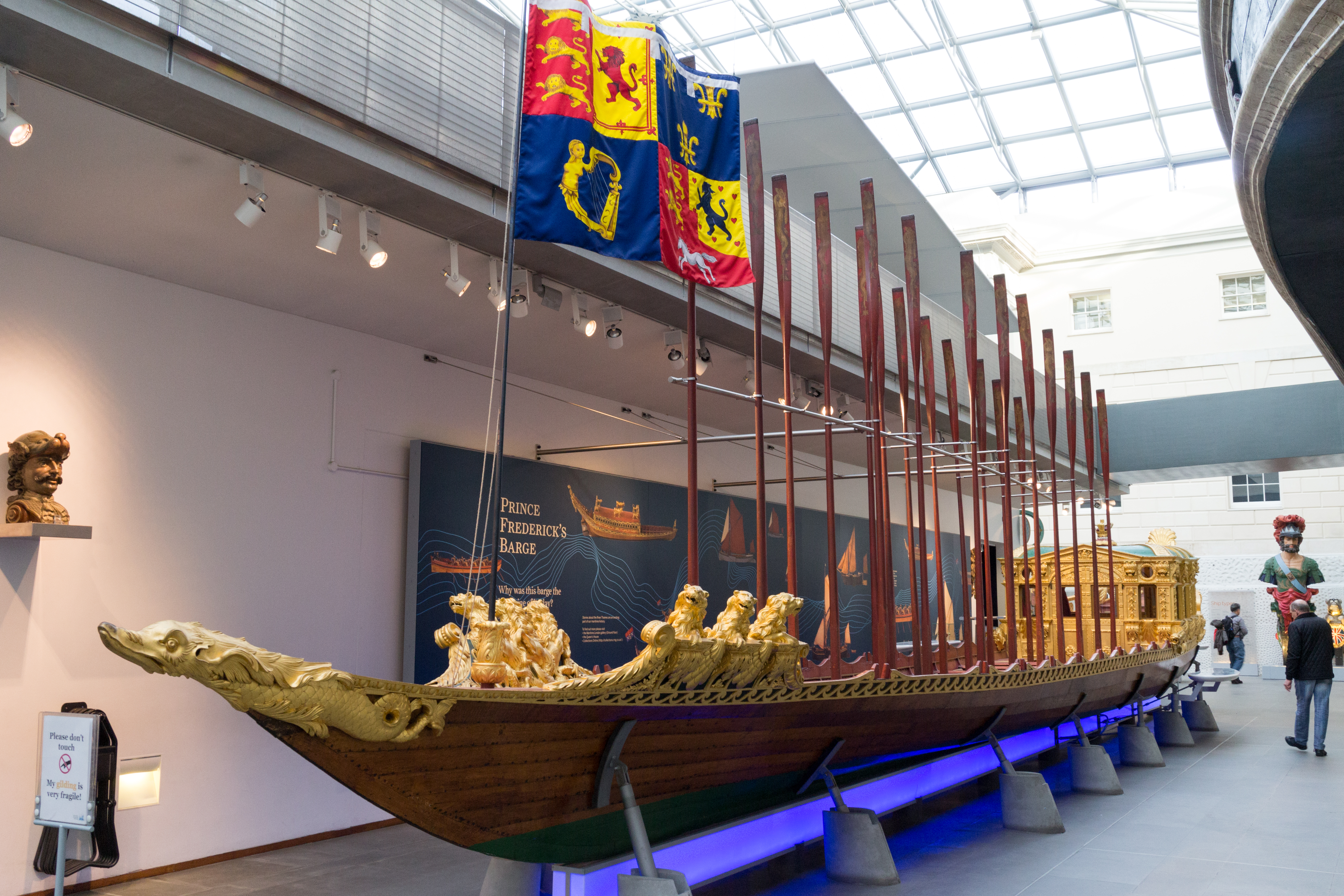
Prince Frederick's Barge, on display at the National Maritime Museum

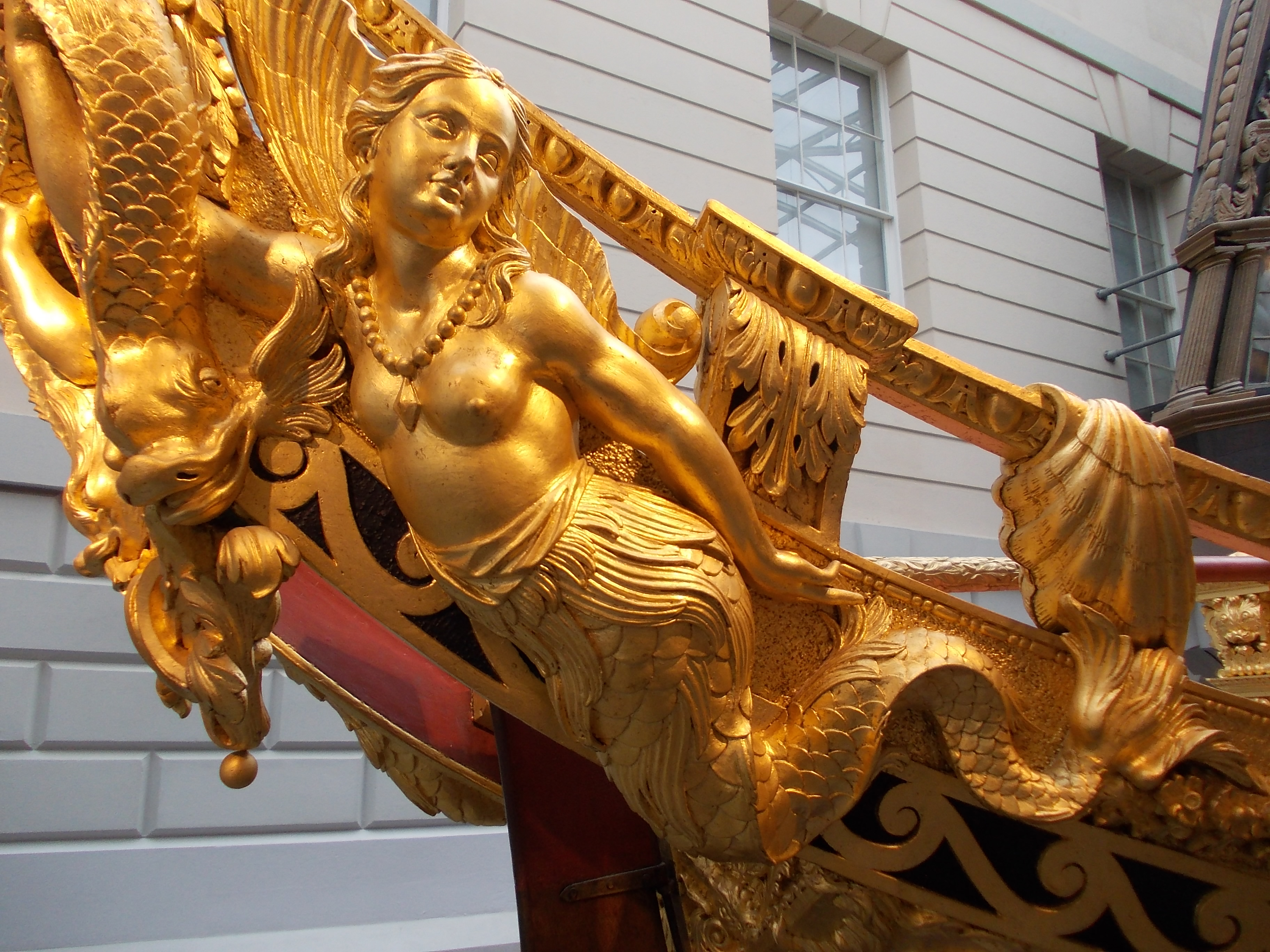
Gilded mermaid figure

Prince Frederick's Barge is a 63 ft 4 in long (19.30 m) British state barge. Designed by William Kent, it was built on the South Bank by John Hall for Frederick, Prince of Wales in 1732. Upon Frederick's death in 1751, the barge was used by successive British monarchs until 1849 when she was cut up into three sections and stored in the Royal Barge House at Windsor Great Park. King George VI placed the barge on loan to the National Maritime Museum, Greenwich in 1951, where it is currently on display.

== See also ==
- State Barge of Charles II
- Queen Mary's Shallop
- Gloriana
