= Queen Mary's Shallop =

Royal Barge

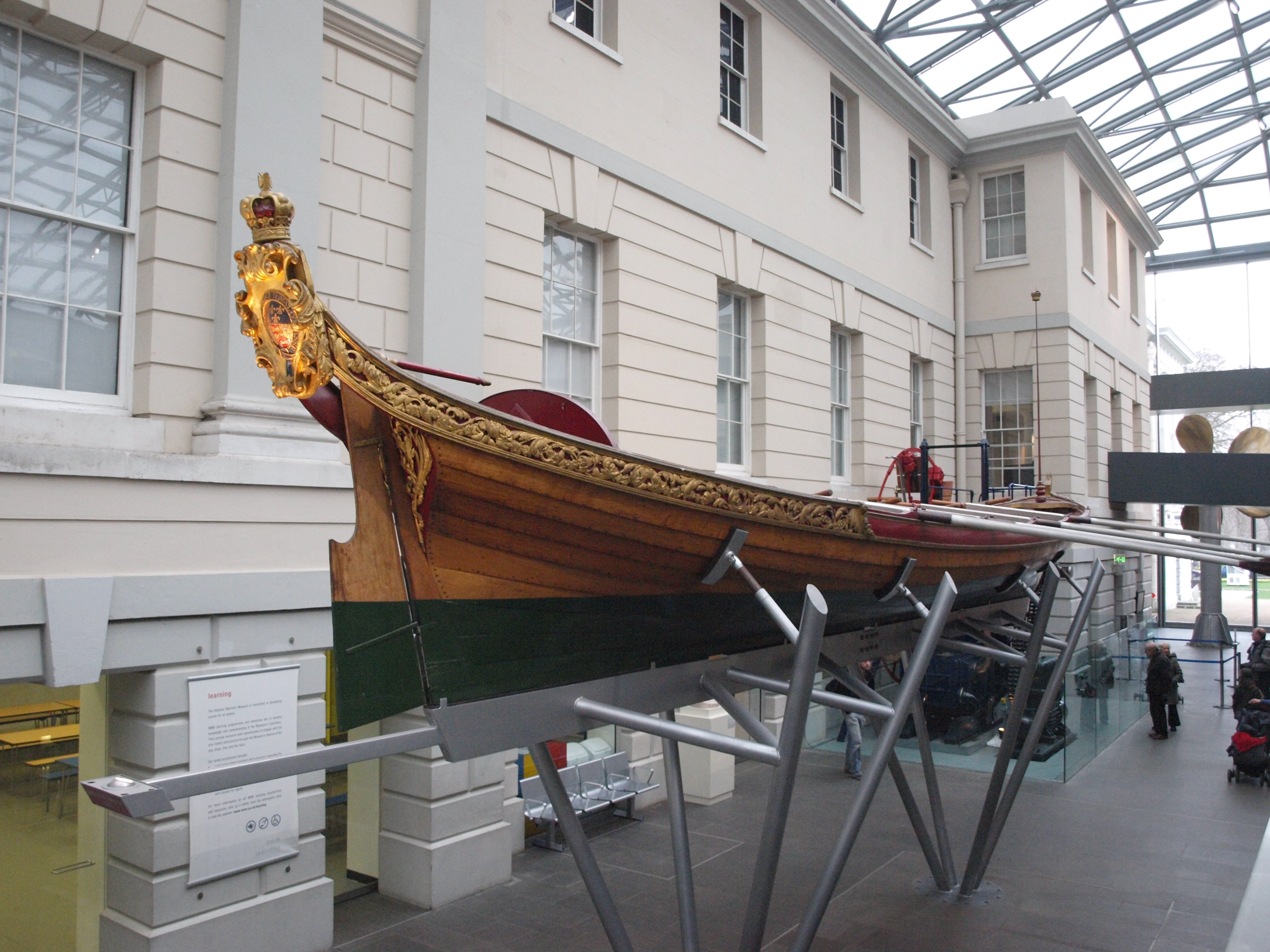
Queen Mary's Shallop at the National Maritime Museum in 2011

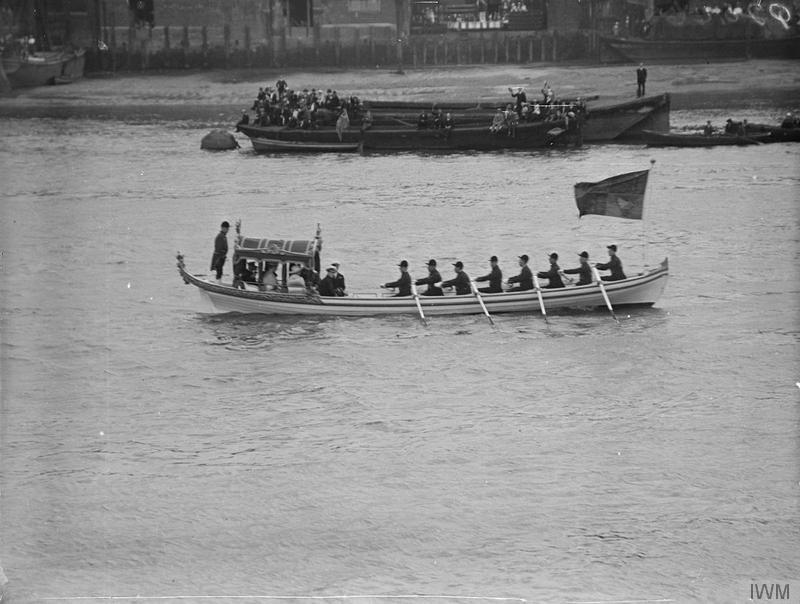
Queen Mary's Shallop passing down the Thames in the naval pageant, 4th August 1919

Queen Mary's Shallop is a 41.60-foot-long (12.68 m) British royal barge commissioned by William III for Queen Mary II in 1689. She was one of several state barges used during state occasions between 1689 and 1849. However, when Prince Frederick's Barge was taken out of service in 1849, she was the only state barge of the English Crown still in use. She was finally retired in the early twentieth century.

She was present at various occasions, such as the Royal Regatta at Henley in 1912, and the Peace Pageant in 1919. In 1930 she was given to the National Maritime Museum by King George V, and is in storage as of 2021.

== See also ==
- State Barge of Charles II
- Gloriana
