= Luton Town Hall =

Municipal building in Luton, Bedfordshire, England

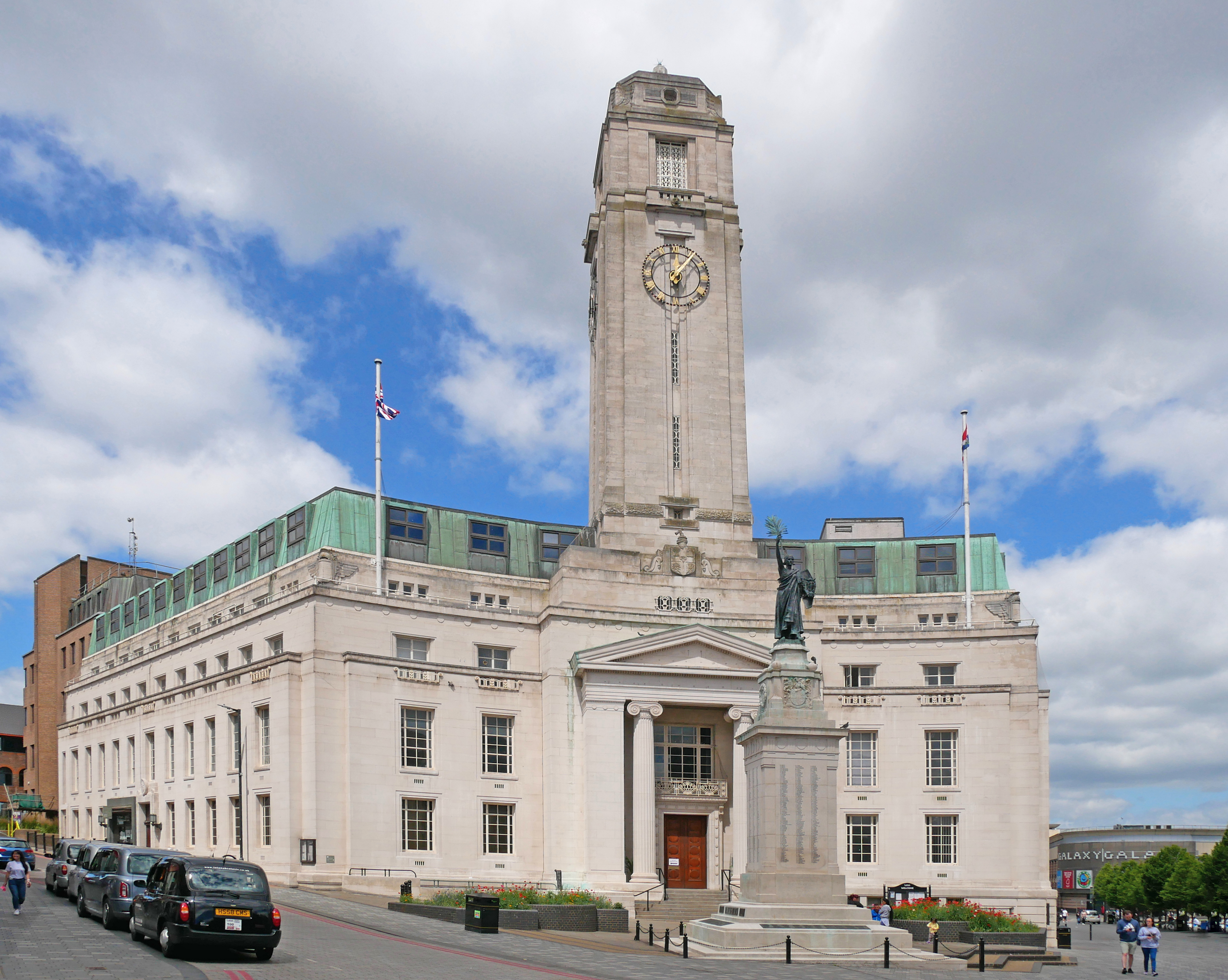
- The current Town Hall, from George Street, Luton

- Shown in Bedfordshire
- 51.8799°N 0.4178°W
- Location: George Street, Luton

History
- Built: 1936

Site notes
- Architect: Bradshaw Gass & Hope
- Architectural style: neoclassical style

Listed Building – Grade II
- Designated: 27 August 1998
- Reference no.: 1376193

Luton Town Hall is a building at the junction between Manchester Street, Upper George Street and George Street, Luton, England; the current building was completed in 1936 on the site of the older Town Hall, which was burnt down on 19 July 1919, following the Peace Day Riots. The current hall, which is the headquarters of Luton Borough Council, is a Grade II listed building.

== History ==
=== First town hall ===
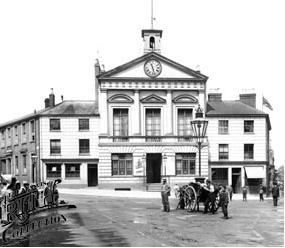
The old Town Hall in 1897, from George Street, Luton

The original Town Hall was built in the classical style with Doric columns supporting a frieze designed by Luton architects John Williams and Sons in 1846 and was built for a total cost excluding the purchasing of the land for £2,200. In 1856 a small tower and clock was added in commemoration of the Crimean War. It was built by the Town Hall Company to hold public meetings and entertainment in the town and was only brought into public ownership by the Luton Local Board of Health in 1874. The building became the headquarters of Luton Borough Council after it succeeded the Local Board of Health in 1876.

On Peace Day, 19 July 1919, a crowd of ex-servicemen assembled, unhappy with unemployment and other grievances. The riot started after members of the council arrived to read out the proclamation of peace and many in the crowd expressed their disapproval. Tension boiled over into violence and a number of protesters broke through the police line and forcibly entered the town hall. Shortly after a number of violent clashes took place, with the town hall being stormed by the crowd and eventually set on fire.

Order was eventually restored to the town by midnight on 19 July, but the fire brigade were unable to extinguish the fire and by the next morning the town hall was little more than ruins. The remains of the building were demolished in August 1919. The war memorial, which was designed by Sir Reginald Blomfield and inscribed with the names of dead servicemen from the First World War, was unveiled in 1922. Following the destruction of the building the town's administration was carried out from the Carnegie library.

=== Second town hall ===
The original site offered the best location in the town for a replacement town hall and in 1930, a competition was held for designs for the new town hall: there were 86 entries to the competition. The competition was won by Bradshaw Gass & Hope from Bolton with a neoclassical style design incorporating Art Deco features. It was built with a steel frame and clad in grey Portland stone and was officially opened by The Duke of Kent on 28 October 1936. Many of the interior features were designed to recall images from the town's coat of arms (the bee, the wheatsheaf, the rose and the thistle), which was carved in stone above the main entrance. The new clock and bells were manufactured by Gillett & Johnston of Croydon; the hour bell installed was the heaviest in the county, weighing approximately two tonnes.

During the Second World War, the clock tower was camouflaged to protect it during air raids as the bright white stonework would have been highly visible from the air. The town hall continued to serve as the headquarters of the borough council for much of the 20th century and remained a meeting place for the enlarged Luton Borough Council, which was formed in 1974. During the 1980s an extension was built on Manchester Street to provide additional office space.
