= Gloriana (barge) =

British royal barge

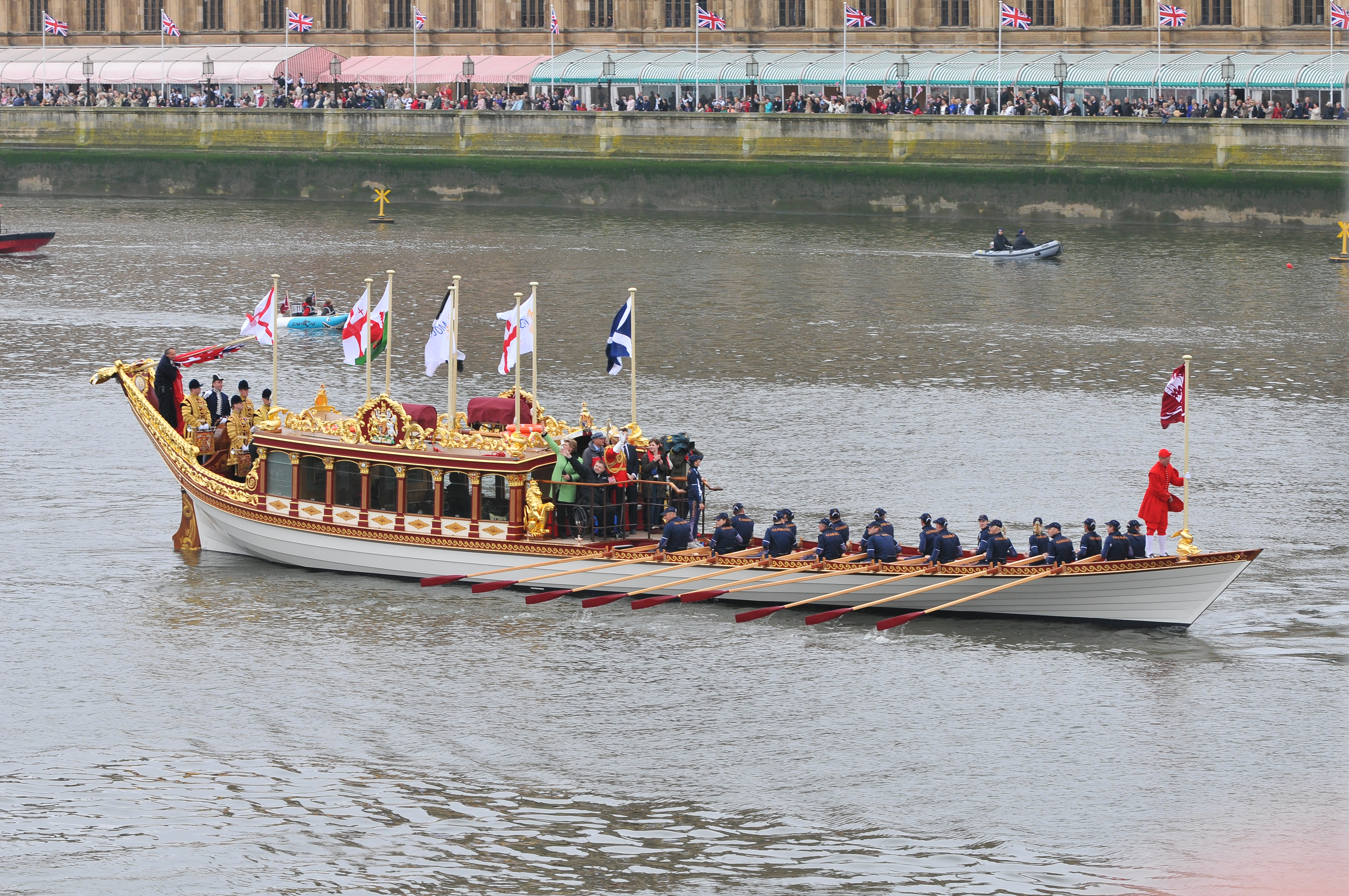
The royal barge Gloriana

Gloriana illuminated as part of the Reflections flotilla in September 2022

Gloriana is a British royal barge. She was privately commissioned as a tribute to Queen Elizabeth II for her 2012 Diamond Jubilee, and was the lead vessel in the Thames Diamond Jubilee Pageant.

== Commissioning ==
The project to build Gloriana was initiated by Lord Sterling of Plaistow, who gained the idea for a waterborne tribute to the Queen for her Diamond Jubilee from her eldest son, Charles, Prince of Wales. Lord Sterling financed much of the estimated £1.5 million construction cost of the project, with additional financial donations from Eyal Ofer, the Gosling Foundation, The Weston Foundation, Lloyd's Register and the Stiftelsen Kristian Gerhard Jebsen Foundation.

Gloriana was presented to the Queen, who asked that the barge be operated on her behalf by The Gloriana Trust assisted by Thames Alive.

== Design and construction ==
Gloriana at Henley Royal Regatta in 2012

Gloriana is a 90-foot-long (27 m) rowing barge. She is powered by 18 oarsmen and two electric inboard engines, and can carry an additional 34 passengers and crew. According to Lord Sterling, the design is inspired by Canaletto's London paintings of 18th-century barges. According to The Daily Telegraph, the design resembles the boat used by the Lord Mayor of London in the 1800s.

Construction began in November 2011 at a site in Brentford. The team consisted of naval architects Stuart Roy and Ed Burnett working with project manager Damian Byrne and the build team was led by master-builder Mark Edwards. The barge is built of wood using traditional methods and includes flooring from sweet chestnut trees from Prince Charles's estate. The sculpture and ornate carvings were made by Polygon Scenery and finished in gold leaf and fine hand painting by Hare & Humphreys.

Gloriana's ornately decorated oars were made by Windsor-based firm J Sutton Blades, oar-makers since the 1970s.

Naval architect Graham Westbrook designed the propulsion system.

== Service ==
=== Launch and naming ===
On 19 April 2012, Gloriana was transported by road from the factory to the River Thames, being placed in the water for the first time at Isleworth. The Queen officially named her on 25 April 2012, during a visit to re-open the restored Cutty Sark in Greenwich. In the time leading up to the Jubilee Pageant, she was moored next to Richmond Bridge, in front of Richmond Bridge Boat Club.

=== Diamond Jubilee pageant ===
Gloriana was the lead vessel in the Thames Diamond Jubilee Pageant, a parade of over 1,000 boats and ships down the River Thames in London, organised as part of the Diamond Jubilee celebrations. She led members of the Royal Family other than the Queen and her husband Prince Philip, Duke of Edinburgh, who were aboard the 210-foot-long (64 m) MV Spirit of Chartwell, a motorised barge. Among the 18 rowers were Olympic gold medallists Sir Steve Redgrave and Sir Matthew Pinsent, also former British Olympic rowing crews including Jonny Searle, Guin Batten, Miriam Batten (Silver medalists at Sydney Olympics in 2000) and Ben Hunt-Davis and also British servicemen – Will Dixon, Rory Mackenzie and Neil Heritage – who all lost limbs in Iraq and Afghanistan.

During the pageant Gloriana carried eight flags, those of the four home nations: England, Scotland, Wales and Northern Ireland, as well as the flag of the City of London and the flag of Cornwall plus the flag of the royal House of Stuart and the flag of Tudor King Henry VIII.

=== Olympic Flame ===
Gloriana carried the Olympic Flame on the river Thames on 27 July 2012, leading three flotillas of rowboats. The rowing crew was drawn from the Olympians Rowing Association with Paul Bircher & Mike Lapage (1948 Silver Medal VIII) stroking the boat with 14 Olympians and two future hopefuls from London Youth Rowing. The barge was moored on the Lea Navigation at the Olympic Park in Stratford during the 2012 Olympic and Paralympic Games.

=== Great River Race ===
On Saturday 15 September 2012, Gloriana was the leading boat of the Great River Race on the final stretch from Richmond, London to the finishing point at Ham, London. Gold Medal rower Sophie Hosking and Silver Medallist Rob Williams were aboard Gloriana. She was also rowed by youngsters supported by The Rowing Foundation, the Race's official charity. She passed under Richmond Bridge before mooring opposite the finish, below Ham House, in time to greet the winner of London's 25th River Marathon.

=== 800th anniversary of Magna Carta ===
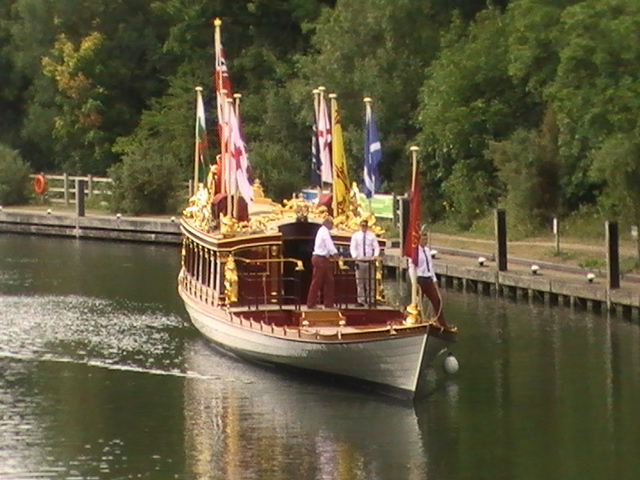
Gloriana at Bray Lock, 23 July 2015. In order to travel along the non-tidal areas of the River Thames, Gloriana is fitted with inboard motors connected to the wheel and rudder. Her oars are stowed on deck when not in use.

On Saturday 13 June 2015 and Sunday 14 June 2015, the Gloriana took part in celebrations commemorating the 800th anniversary of the sealing of Magna Carta. Accompanied by various other royal boats, including the Royal Shallop Jubilant, she journeyed from Marlow to Runnymede, the location where Magna Carta was sealed by King John. On board the Jubilant was the Windsor Magna Carta, a facsimile of the original 1215 Magna Carta currently stored in the archives of the Windsor and Royal Borough Museum.

== Outside state usage ==
The Gloriana has been based in St Katharine Docks, London, where she is moored and prepared for usage. During the summer, the barge can often be observed travelling between central London and Henley on Thames, powered by her inboard motors.

== See also ==
- King's Bargemaster
- Prince Frederick's Barge
- Queen Mary's Shallop
- State Barge of Charles II
