= Mark Edwards (boatbuilder) =

English boatbuilder

Mark Lochrin Edwards MBE
- Born: August 1954 (age 71); Cornwall, England
- Occupation: Boatbuilder

Mark Lochrin Edwards MBE (born August 1954) is an English traditional boatbuilder based at Richmond Bridge in Richmond, London, England. He has constructed several significant reproductions of vintage boats and built the Royal barge Gloriana, the lead ship in the Thames Diamond Jubilee Pageant in June 2012.

Edwards has built and maintained a variety of watercraft over the years including Thames skiffs, punts, shallops, cutters, and wherries. However, he is noted for four particular builds:

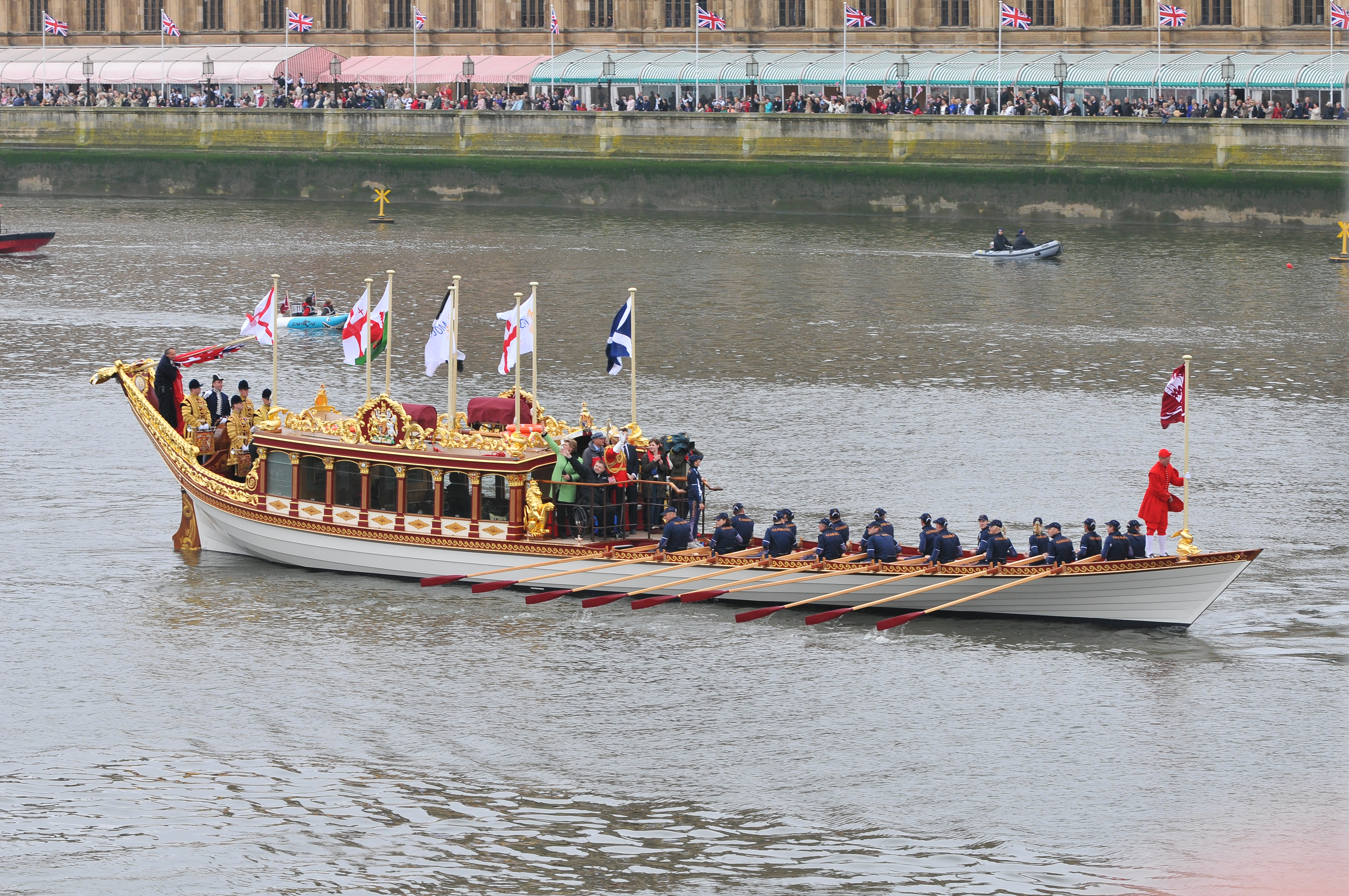
The royal barge Gloriana

- In 2002 he built an eight-oared shallop, The Jubilant, to celebrate the Golden Jubilee of Elizabeth II.
- In 2002 he built a wooden submarine based on the original 17th-century version by Cornelius Jacobszoon Drebbel. This was shown in the BBC TV programme Building the Impossible in November 2002. It was successfully tested under water with two rowers at Dorney Lake in Buckinghamshire. Legal considerations prevented its use on the River Thames itself.
- In 2004 he built two replicas of the original boats used in the 1829 Boat Race. These were raced by former members of Oxford and Cambridge crews over the original course at Henley and prior to the 2004 Boat Race from Putney.
- In 2011 and 2012 he built the 94-foot-long (29 m) Gloriana, a rowing barge powered by 18 oarsmen as the lead ship in the Thames Diamond Jubilee Pageant.

Edwards was appointed a Member of the Order of the British Empire (MBE) in the 2013 Birthday Honours for services to boatbuilding, heritage and the Diamond Jubilee.
