= Peace Day 1919 =

1919 parade in London

Peace Day, 1919
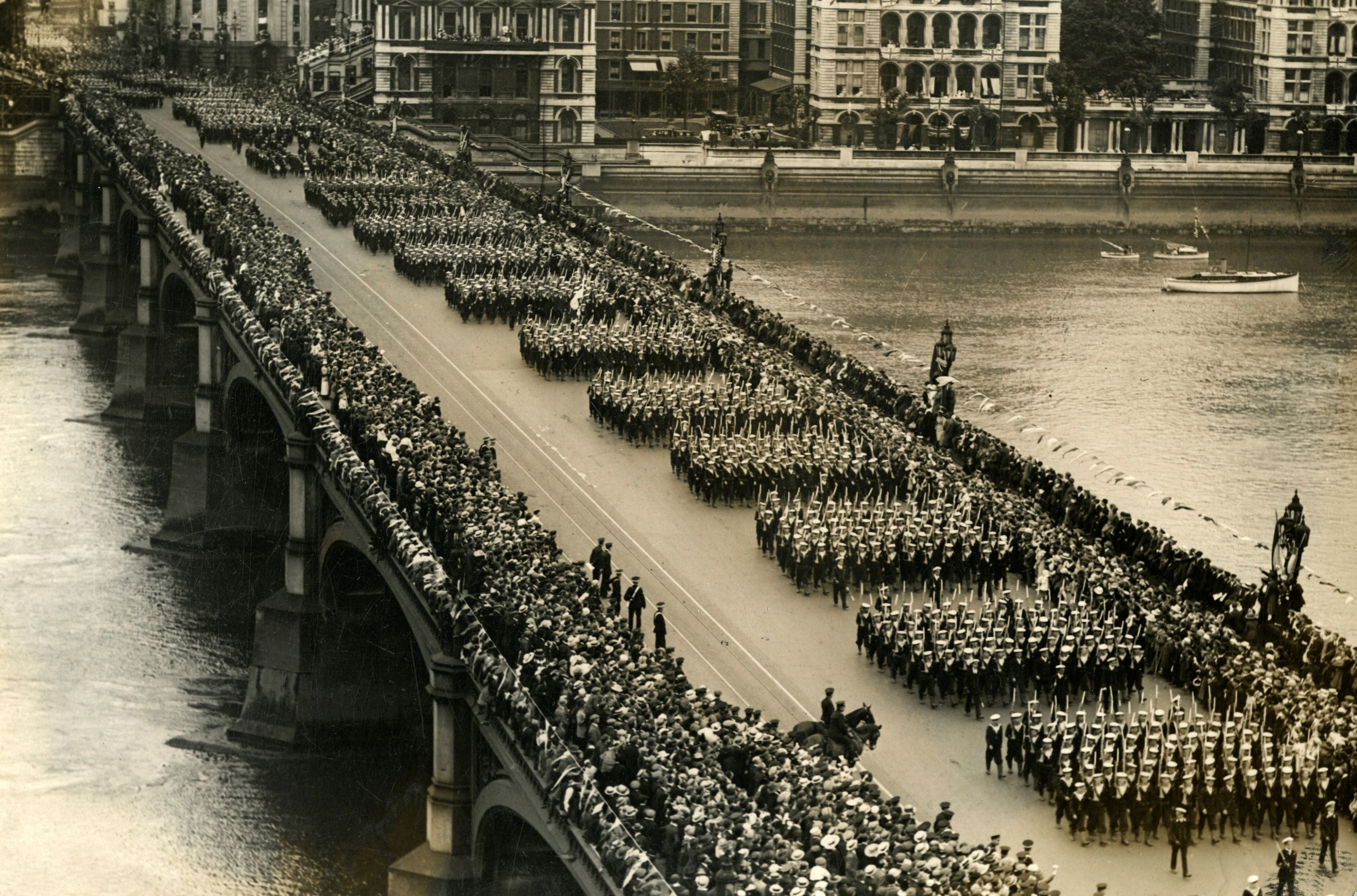
- Sailors of the Royal Navy parade over Westminster Bridge
- Date: 19 July 1919
- Location: London and numerous other locations in the British Empire

Peace Day was a commemoration held on 19 July 1919 throughout the United Kingdom and the British Empire, to mark the signing of the Treaty of Versailles that finally ended the First World War. The main event was a military parade of British, Imperial and Allied soldiers, sailors and airmen through the streets of London to Buckingham Palace, where the salute was taken by King George V and Queen Mary. The day was also marked by locally organised processions, pageants and feasts. Some demobilised servicemen were unhappy at the extravagance of these events when they were experiencing hardship, resulting in civil disorder in some places.

== Background ==
Although the Armistice of 11 November 1918 had brought an abrupt end to the fighting, the First World War would not formally end until the Paris Peace Conference had worked out the details of a settlement. The conference began in January 1919; it was domimated by the "Big Four" allied powers; France, the United Kingdom, Italy and the United States, and resulted in the Treaty of Versailles which was signed in June 1919.

When it became apparent that a conclusion to the negotiations was at hand, a committee of the War Cabinet was established to consider how the restoration of peace ought best to be publicly celebrated. It met for the first time on 9 May 1919 under the chairmanship of Lord Curzon, the Secretary of State for Foreign Affairs, who had organised the spectacular Delhi Durbar of 1911. The initial proposal was for a four-day event in the first week of August, including a military parade and a pageant on the River Thames. Although various government departments and the Armed Forces were represented on the committee, there was no attempt to consult any of the three main ex-servicemen's organisations. Two of these, the National Association of Discharged Sailors and Soldiers and the National Federation of Discharged and Demobilised Sailors and Soldiers, had organised a protest rally in London on 6 May that had ended in violent disorder outside the Houses of Parliament.

The treaty was finally signed on 28 June; the War Cabinet met two days later to consider the plans for the public celebrations. Curzon reported that the king thought that August would be too long a delay and that the events ought to be held on 6 July, giving only six days for preparation. After again consulting the king and with much debate, it was finally decided that Thanksgiving Services should be held throughout the Empire on Sunday 6 July, with the "National Celebrations of Peace" on Saturday 19 July. Curzon had stated that he "doubted whether the occasion really justified extensive rejoicing". The prime minister, David Lloyd George, suggested that a symbolic monument should represent the dead at some point on the parade route, similar to the large temporary catafalque being constructed at the Arc de Triomphe in Paris as a focal point for the Bastille Day military parade on 14 July

== Dominion victory parade ==
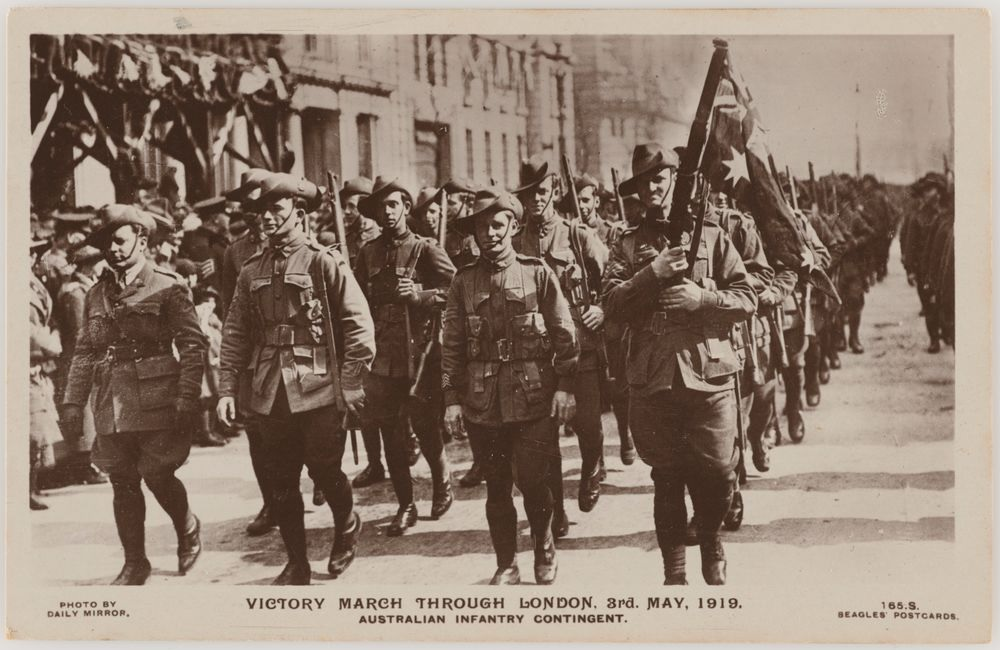
Australian troops marching in the Dominion victory parade of 3 May 1919.

Even before the Treaty of Versailles had been signed, it was realised that the troops of the British Dominions were rapidly embarking for home and that if their contribution were to be formally marked, it needed to be done soon. Therefore. on Saturday 3 May 1919, a parade of Dominion troops was held in London, with the salute being taken by the king. Australian, Canadian, South African, New Zealand, and Newfoundland contingents formed up in Hyde Park and marched past Buckingham Palace, where the Royal Family and senior officers stood on a dais. The parade included tanks, guns and captured war trophies; there was also a flypast of fourteen aircraft and an airship. The procession continued into Victoria Street to Whitehall and then into The Strand and Kingsway, returning to Hyde Park by way of High Holborn, Oxford Street and Marble Arch.

== National Service of Thanksgiving ==
A National Service of Thanksgiving was swiftly organised by Lord Stamfordham, the king's private secretary. He suggested that before and at the conclusion of the traditional Anglican service at St Paul's Cathedral, the king and royal family should pause at the top of the steps for an ecumenical act of worship that could be witnessed by a large number of the public in the forecourt below. Lloyd George insisted that government ministers should have a prominent position in the proceedings. The service, on Sunday 6 July, drew large crowds at the cathedral and all along the route to and from Buckingham Palace. Simultaneous services were also held in local churches across the United Kingdom and on the site of the Western Front in Belgium.

== The Cenotaph ==
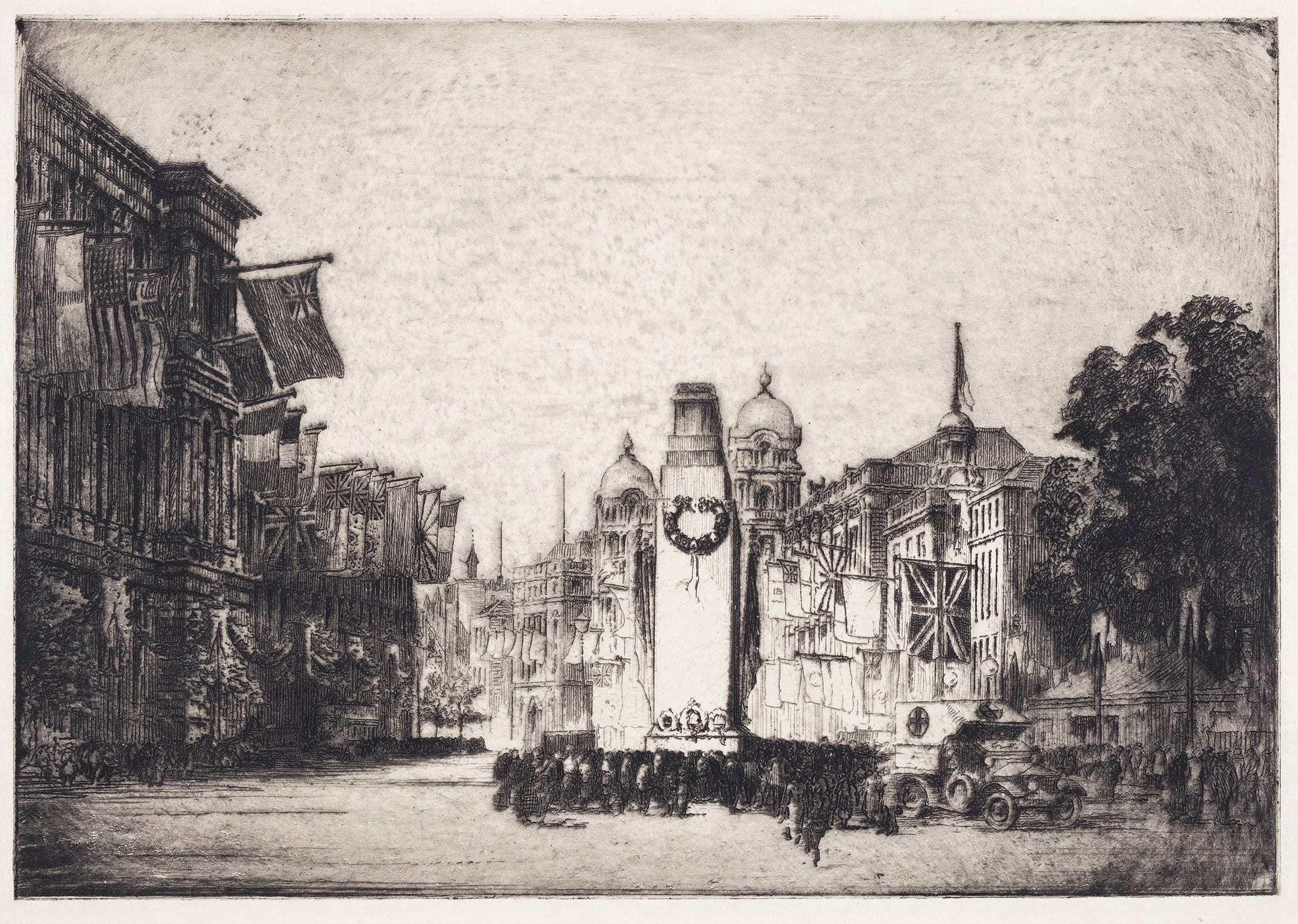
The Temporary Cenotaph, Whitehall, an etching by William Monk (1863–1937).

On the same day that Lloyd George had suggested a "temporary pylon" as a focal point for the planned parade, Sir Edwin Lutyens was requested to design one that would be non-denominational and could be constructed in a fortnight. Lutyens suggested using the term cenotaph, which means an empty tomb. The basis for the Lutyens' design may have been the Stone of Remembrance which he had devised in 1917 for the Imperial War Graves Commission, and a sketch by him, very similar to the final Cenotaph, survives dated 4 June 1919, some four weeks before it was requested. The monument itself was constructed of wood, canvas and plaster in Whitehall outside the Foreign Office Main Building in only eleven days by the Ministry of Works; it was unveiled on Friday 18 July, the day before the parade.

== Victory parade ==
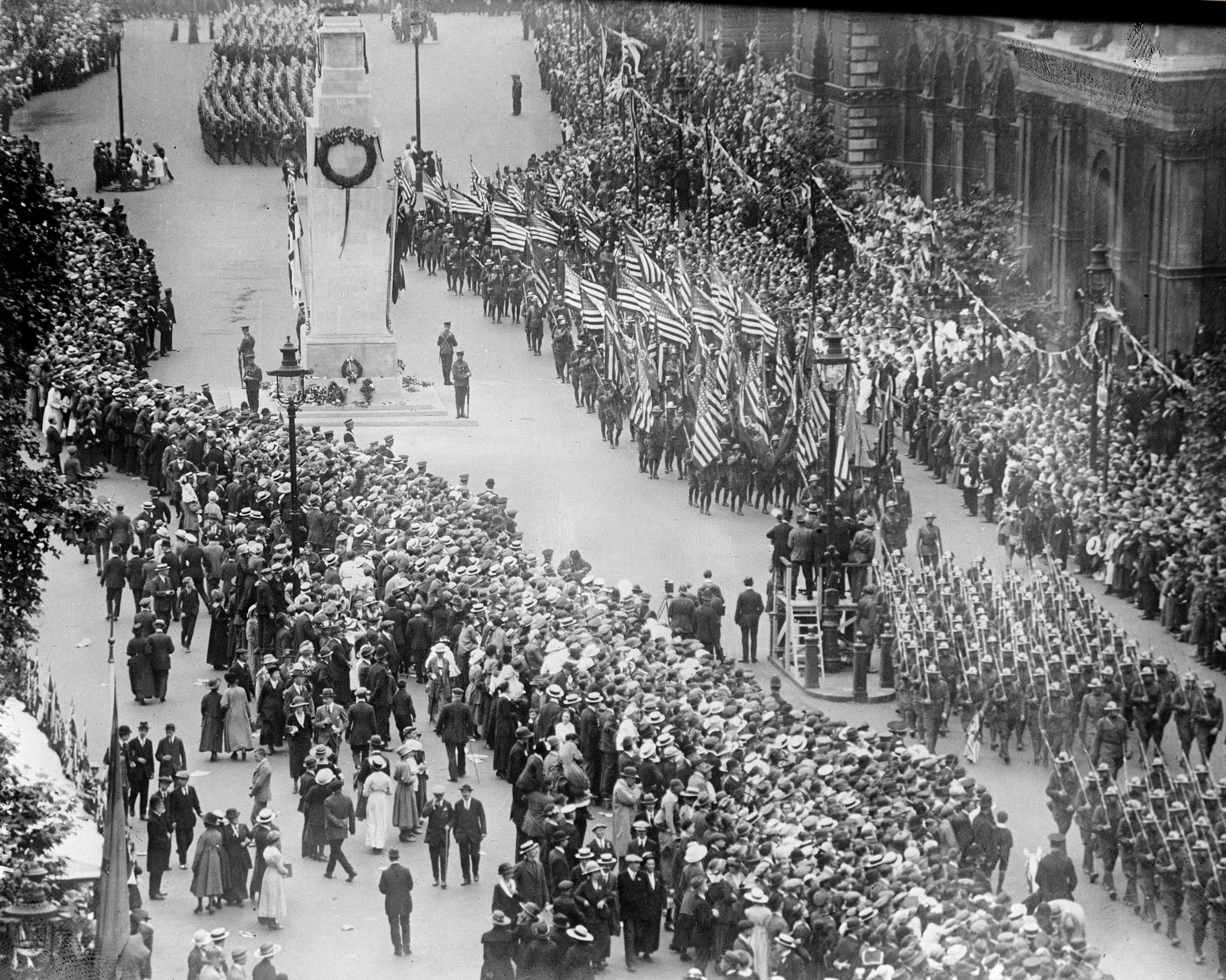
US troops passing the Cenotaph in Whitehall.

Some 15,000 British, Imperial and Allied troops had been assembled for the parade, many lodged in a temporary camp in Kensington Gardens. A huge number of spectators came to London for the day, estimated at five million people; military bands played in the Royal Parks to entertain them. That morning, the King issued this message:

To these, the sick and wounded who cannot take part in the festival of victory, I send out greetings and bid them good cheer, assuring them that the wounds and scars so honourable in themselves, inspire in the hearts of their fellow countrymen the warmest feelings of gratitude and respect.

Near Buckingham Palace, a special grandstand had been erected for disabled servicemen in their "hospital blue" uniforms, while another was provided for war widows and orphans.

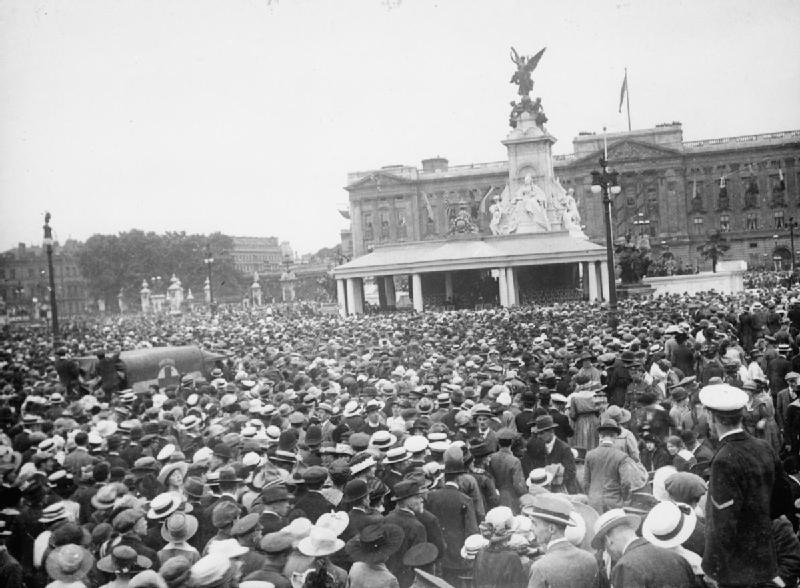
Crowds surround the royal dais at Buckingham Palace, shortly after the parade had marched past.

The parade formed-up in Hyde Park. The procession was led by General Pershing on a brown horse, leading a contingent of the American Expeditionary Forces, followed by Belgian troops and representatives of China and the Czech Legion. The large French contingent was led on horseback by Marshal Foch, escorted by lancers; they were followed by Greek, Italian, Japanese, Polish, Portuguese, Romanian, Serb and Siamese contingents. The British element was led by the Royal Navy, headed by Admiral Beatty and including representatives of the Women's Royal Naval Service and the Merchant Navy. Field Marshal Lord Haig and other general officers led the British Army, ahead of a column formed of "Old Contemptibles", soldiers who had fought with the British Expeditionary Force since 1914, followed by representatives of every corps and branch. Next came Dominion and Colonial troops, the Labour Corps, the Women's Legion, medical staff, military chaplains and finally the newly founded Royal Air Force.

The parade moved off from the Albert Gate in Hyde Park at 10 am, starting on a 7 miles (11 km) long route through Knightsbridge, Belgravia and Victoria; across Vauxhall Bridge, through Kennington and back over Westminster Bridge. From there, the procession moved into Whitehall where the Cenotaph was saluted in memory of the fallen. Passing through Admiralty Arch, the parade marched along The Mall to Buckingham Palace, where the king and queen took the salute at the Victoria Memorial. Then onwards up Constitution Hill to Hyde Park Corner. The whole parade took two hours to pass any given point.

After the parade, public entertainments were laid on in the Royal Parks, culminating in the evening with a huge fireworks display. Unexpectedly, members of the public laid a large quantity of wreaths and bouquets at the Cenotaph for the rest of the day and in the days following.

== Other celebrations ==
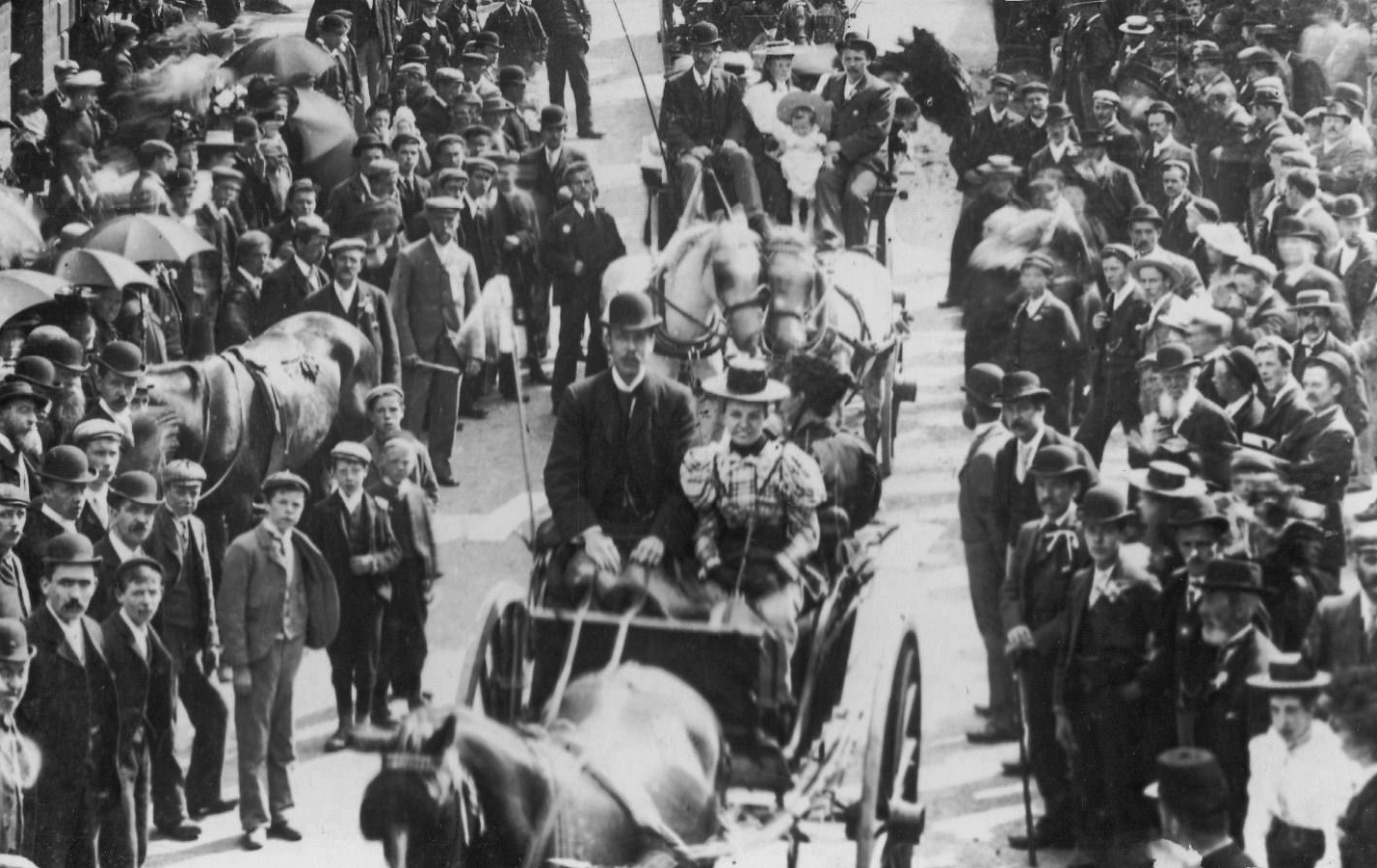
A Peace Day procession in Penistone, Yorkshire.

As invisaged, Peace Day was celebrated by cities, towns and villages across the United Kingdom and around the Empire. In Brighton for instance, there was a parade led by demobilised and disabled veterans, followed by decorated vehicles and people in fancy dress, culminating that evening in dancing and a firework display. In Truro, the previous day saw a sports day for the city's schoolchildren and a dinner and concert for five hundred veterans, while on Peace Day itself, there were speeches, a parade and carnival, dancing and a bonfire. A line of beacons was lit stretching from the south coast of England to the northeast coast of Scotland.

=== Protests ===
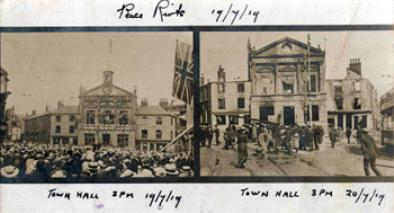
Luton Town Hall on Peace Day (left) and the following morning after protestors had set it on fire.

Many demobilised servicemen had found adjusting to civilian life and finding work and housing difficult. The large sums spent on the Peace Day celebrations seemed objectionable to some, especially if veterans were excluded from events. In Coventry, discontent caused by the omission of ex-servismen and munitions workers from a historical pageant led to three days of disorder and the damage of thirty-five shops thought to have been guilty of profiteering. In Wood Green, police were attacked and in Swindon, a large crowd pulled down a flag pole and Union Jack erected for the occasion. In Wolverhampton and Bilston, police stations were attacked after demonstrators had been arrested. The worst disturbances were in Luton, where the mayor was a suspected profiteer and the council had refused permission for veterans to hold a religious service in a public park. A Peace Day banquet at Luton Town Hall was free for councillors and their guests, but tickets for others were priced beyond the means of ex-servicemen. Crowds burst into the town hall beforehand and had to be evicted by police. Later in the evening, the building was set on fire and gutted; the crowd was eventually dispersed by police and soldiers early the next morning.

== Thames Peace Pageant ==
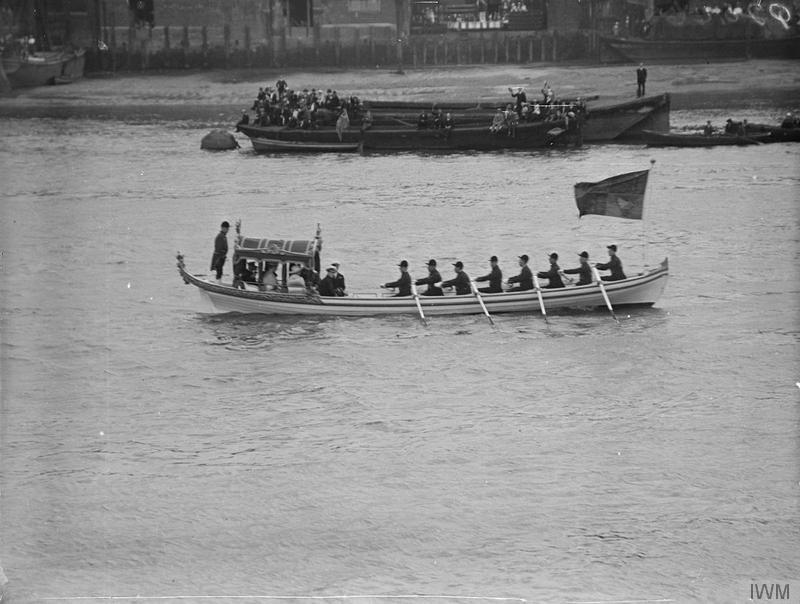
The King and Queen leading the Peace Pageant in the royal barge.

The "great river pageant" originally envisaged by Lord Curzon during his proposed four-day event was held on 4 August 1919, to mark the anniversary of the British entry into the war. The five mile (eight kilometre) procession along the River Thames was led by the king and queen, who were rowed in the 230 year-old royal barge, Queen Mary's Shallop, followed by boats carrying the Board of Admiralty and the Lord Mayor of London, escorted by numerous naval and mercantile vessels and a barge filled with captured guns. Starting at London Bridge, the royal party disembarked at Cadogan Pier on the Chelsea Embankment, where they took the salute of the passing watercraft. Along the riverbank, bands played and choirs sang sea shanties, while the bridges, wharves and cranes were decorated with flags and streamers. After passing the king, the procession returned the way they had come.
