= Bust of Bernardo O'Higgins, London =

Bust of Chilean general in Richmond, London

Coordinates: 51.4579°N 0.3058°W

Bust of Bernardo O'Higgins
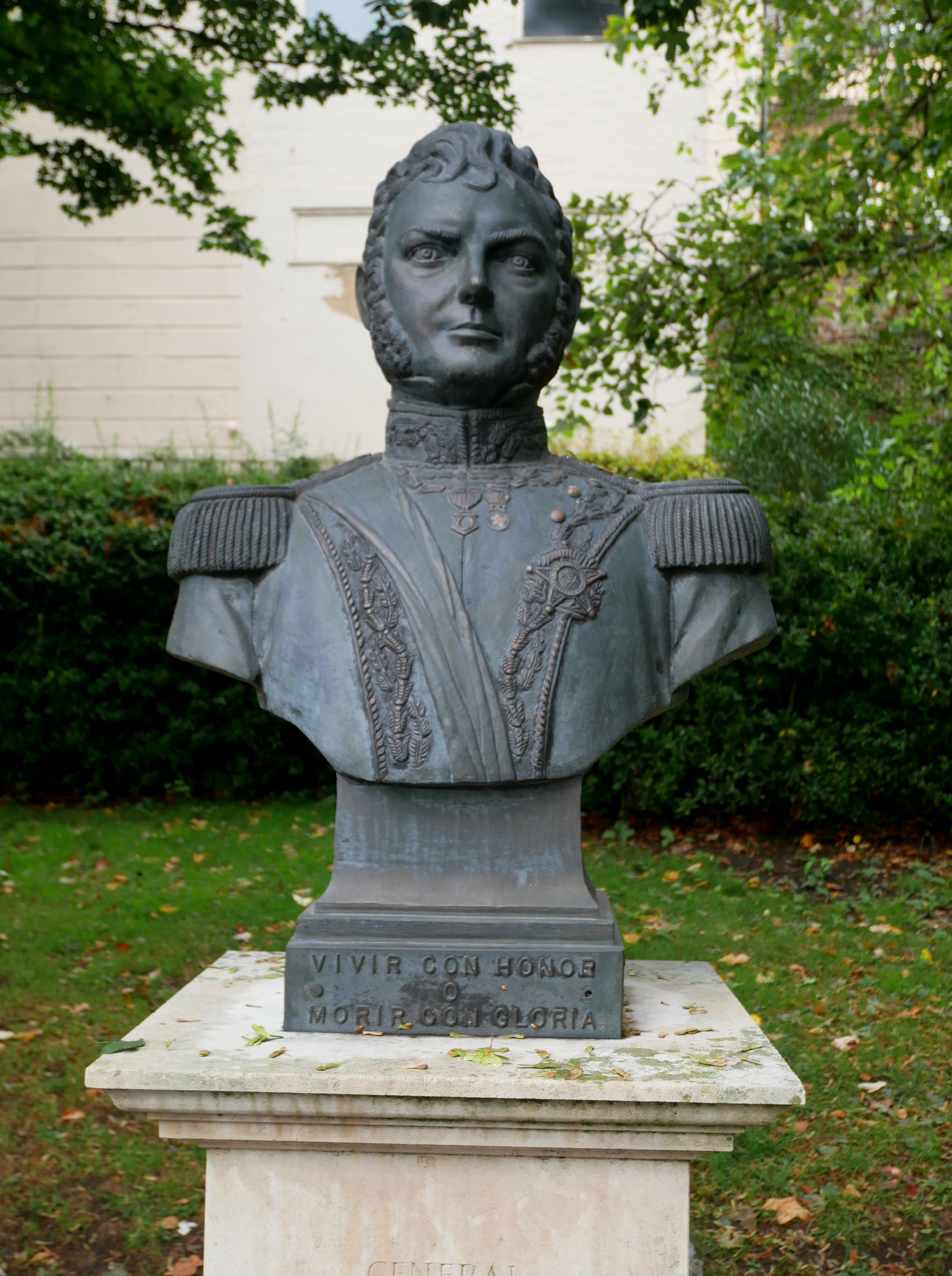
- Artist: Unknown
- Completion date: 1998
- Subject: Bernardo O'Higgins
- Location: Richmond, London

A Bust of Bernardo O'Higgins, stands next to Richmond Bridge in Richmond, London. The bust is a copy of a design found widely throughout Chile of an unknown artist.

The bust is set in Bridge House Gardens, sometimes known as O'Higgins Square, and is the creation of Chilean architect Marcial Echenique. Its subject is Bernardo O'Higgins who led the Chilean army during the war of independence, and would later go on to become the country's first head of state. Prior to this, he lived in Richmond for two years during his study in his youth. On the anniversary of his birth in each year, the Chilean ambassador pays a visit to the statue and places a wreath to celebrate the connection.
