= 2026 Tower Hamlets London Borough Council election =

- 7 May 2026
- Mayoral election
- Turnout: 42.0%
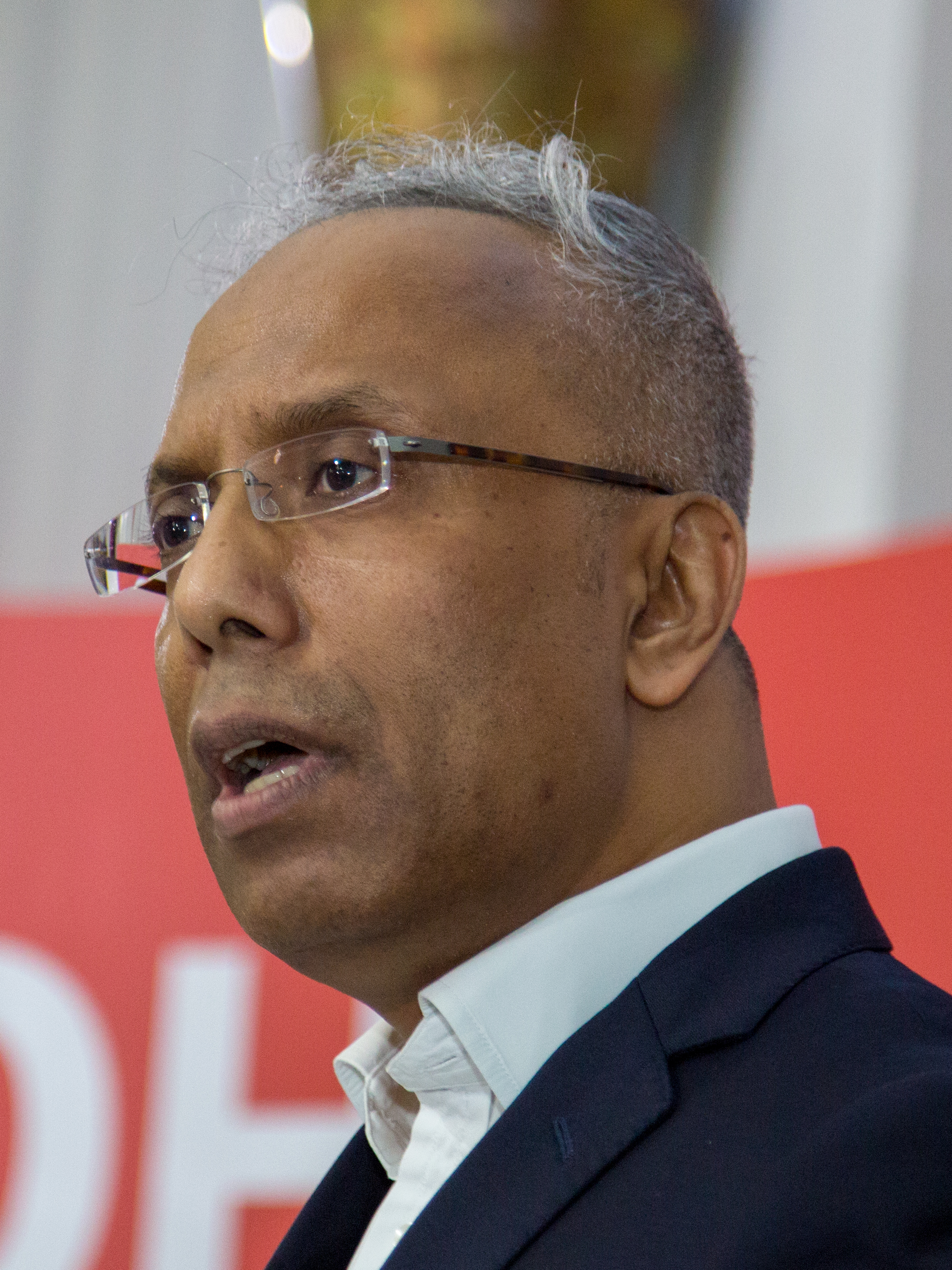
Candidate	Lutfur Rahman	Sirajul Islam
Party	Aspire	Labour
Popular vote	35,679	19,454
Percentage	38.8%	21.1%
Candidate	Hirra Khan Adeogun	John Bullard
Party	Green	Reform
Popular vote	19,223	7,153
Percentage	20.9%	7.8%
- Council election
- All 45 seats in Tower Hamlets London Borough Council; 23 seats needed for a majority
- Turnout: 42.36%
Party	Leader	Vote %	Seats	+/–
Aspire	Lutfur Rahman (Note: As mayor)	32.25	33	+9
Green	Hirra Khan	22.83	5	+4
Labour	Sirajul Islam	22.67	5	−14
Liberal Democrats	Rabina Khan	4.83	1	+1
Conservative	Peter Golds	4.79	1	0
This lists parties that won seats. See the complete results below.
Results by ward

The 2026 Tower Hamlets London Borough Council election took place on 7 May 2026, as part of the 2026 United Kingdom local elections. All 45 members of Tower Hamlets London Borough Council were elected, with a concurrent mayoral election taking place to determine the council's leader. The elections took place alongside the local elections in the other London boroughs. The local political party Aspire won 33 out of the 45 seats up for election, gaining majority control of the council, which had previously been under no overall control, while Aspire's founder and leader Lutfur Rahman won the mayoral election.

== Background ==
Result of the 2022 council election

Since its formation in 1965, Tower Hamlets had generally been under Labour control, with brief exceptions. From 1990 to 2006, all councillors elected to the council were Labour or Liberal Democrats; this was challenged in the 2006 election, by the new Respect Party winning twelve seats and the Conservatives taking seven.

In the 2010 election Respect lost all but one of its seats, with Labour winning a large majority, but a simultaneous referendum on introducing a directly elected mayor of Tower Hamlets, which was only backed by Respect, was successful.

The Labour councillor Lutfur Rahman, who had been council leader in 2008 until he was replaced in 2010 after a Channel 4 documentary linked him to the Islamic Forum of Europe, was selected as Labour candidate for the mayoral election. He was removed as the candidate by the National Executive Committee of the Labour Party after "very serious allegations" about the selection. He subsequently ran as an independent candidate with support from Respect. Rahman was elected in the October 2010 election in the first round.

Having set up a new political party called Tower Hamlets First, Rahman ran for re-election in 2014, being re-elected in the second round against the Labour candidate John Biggs. In the concurrent council election, Tower Hamlets First won 18 seats, with Labour on 22 and the Conservatives on 5, resulting in no overall control of the council.

In 2015, Rahman was removed from office and his election was declared void after he was found guilty of electoral fraud. He was barred from seeking re-election for five years. Tower Hamlets First was de-registered as a political party by the Electoral Commission shortly after. In the 2015 re-run of the mayoral election, Rahman endorsed the independent candidate Rabina Khan. Khan had been elected as a Labour councillor in 2010 but had been suspended for supporting Rahman's initial 2010 election, and had been re-elected in the 2014 council election as a Tower Hamlets First councillor. Biggs won the election.

The former Tower Hamlets First councillors formed the Tower Hamlets Independent Group. Khan formed the breakaway group the People's Alliance of Tower Hamlets (PATH) with some other Tower Hamlets Independent Group councillors, which was formally registered in 2018. The remaining Tower Hamlets Independent Group councillors formed the new party Aspire.

In the 2018 council election, Labour won 42 seats of the 45 available with 46.1% of the vote. Khan was elected as a councillor for PATH, with her party winning 11.3% of the vote across the borough. Aspire lost all their representation, winning no seats with 15.4% of the vote.

In the 2022 elections, Aspire regained control of the council from Labour, winning 24 seats, and also won the mayoralty with Lutfur Rahman returning as mayor. Reduced to 19 seats, this was the lowest ever number of seats Labour have ever held in the history of Tower Hamlets.

== Electoral process and campaigns ==
=== Council ===
Tower Hamlets, like other London borough councils, elects all of its councillors at once every four years. The previous election took place in 2022. The election took place by multi-member first-past-the-post voting, with each ward being represented by two or three councillors. Electors had as many votes as there are councillors to be elected in their ward, with the top two or three being elected.

All registered electors (British, Irish, Commonwealth and European Union citizens) living in London aged 18 or over were entitled to vote in the election. People who live at two addresses in different councils, such as university students with different term-time and holiday addresses, were entitled to be registered for and vote in elections in both local authorities.

=== Mayor ===
Since 2022, the United Kingdom has used first past the post to elect local mayors. There is only one round of voting, with the candidate with the most votes winning. The mayoral election had nine candidates, with incumbent mayor Lutfur Rahman seeking reelection. Rahman's campaign received heavy criticism due to his previously being barred from office for electoral fraud, with a former Aspire councillor accusing Rahman of running "an autocratic council". His campaign was endorsed by Your Party and The Muslim Vote.

The Labour Party's candidate was councillor Sirajul Islam, who received endorsement from Matthew Parris in The Spectator. The Green Party chose Hirra Khan Adeogun as its mayoral candidate after their previous candidate, Nathalie Bienfait, withdrew from the election after a rent increase forced her to move out of Tower Hamlets.

== Council composition ==
After 2022 election		Before 2026 election		After 2026 election	
Party	Seats	Party	Seats	Party	Seats
Aspire	24	Aspire	22	Aspire	33
Labour	19	Labour	16	Labour	5
Green	1	Green	1	Green	5
Conservative	1	Conservative	1	Conservative	1
Independent	0	Independent	5	Independent	0
Liberal Democrats	0	Liberal Democrats	0	Liberal Democrats	1

Changes 2022–2026:

- November 2023: Ayas Miah (Labour) leaves party to sit as an independent
- 2024: Sabina Khan (Labour) joins Aspire
- June 2024: Sabina Akhtar (Labour) leaves party to sit as an independent
- August 2024: Rachel Blake (Labour) resigns – by-election held September 2024
- September 2024: Abdi Mohamed (Labour) wins by-election; Kabir Hussain (Aspire) leaves party to sit as an independent
- October 2024: Saif Uddin Khaled (Aspire) and Ohid Ahmed (Aspire) leave party to sit as independents
- November 2024: Jahed Choudhury (Aspire) leaves party to sit as an independent; Sabina Akhtar (independent) joins Aspire

== Council results summary ==
Council composition after the 2022 election

Council composition after the 2026 election

2026 Tower Hamlets London Borough Council election
Party	Seats	Gains	Losses	Net gain/loss	Seats %	Votes %	Votes	+/−
Aspire	33	10	1	▲9	73.3	32.25	67,695	▼4.6
Green	5	4	0	▲4	11.1	22.83	47,910	▲13.9
Labour	5	0	14	▼14	11.1	22.67	47,589	▼13.8
Liberal Democrats	1	1	0	▲1	2.2	4.83	10,141	▼4.1
Conservative	1	0	0	Steady	2.2	4.79	10,045	▼2.9
Reform	0	0	0	Steady	0.0	5.90	12,382	N/A
Tower Hamlets Independents	0	0	0	Steady	0.0	4.13	8,662	N/A
Independent	0	0	0	Steady	0.0	2.28	4,776	▲1.4
TUSC	0	0	0	Steady	0.0	<1	664	
The Forward Party	0	0	0	Steady	0.0	<1	12	N/A

== Ward results ==
The Tower Hamlets council announced the list of nominated candidates for each website on their website on the 10 April 2026.

=== Bethnal Green East ===
Bethnal Green East (3)
Party	Candidate	Votes	%	±%
Aspire	Syed Abdullah	2,371		
Aspire	Ahmodul Kabir*	2,177		
Aspire	Halima Islam	2,123		
Green	Rebecca Binns	1,922		
Labour	Rebekah Sultana*	1,683		
Green	Harriet Walsh	1,641		
Green	Liam McQuade	1,596		
Labour	Nazma Hussain	1,526		
Labour	Martin Nesbit	1,207		
Reform	Gareth Thomas	505		
Conservative	Richard Trounson	249		
Liberal Democrats	Freda Graf	218		
Conservative	Ana Campillo	211		
Tower Hamlets Independents	Md Ahmed	194		
Conservative	Marc Pisanski	183		
Liberal Democrats	Fraser King	178		
Tower Hamlets Independents	Md Kamruzzaman	163		
Tower Hamlets Independents	Muhebul Hasan	136		
Liberal Democrats	Rizgar Khourshid	110		
TUSC	Robbie Davidson	93		
The Forward Party	Adham Alkhatip	12		
Turnout			%	
Rejected ballots		30		
Aspire gain from Labour				
Aspire gain from Labour				
Aspire hold				

=== Bethnal Green West ===
Bethnal Green West (3)
Party	Candidate	Votes	%	±%
Aspire	Abu Chowdhury*	2,452		
Aspire	Musthak Ahmed*	2,445		
Aspire	Amin Rahman*	2,275		
Green	Mae Dobbs	2,139		
Green	Chelsea Omoogun	1,875		
Independent	Ted Maxwell	1,383		
Labour	Carmie Greusard-Deffeuille	1,218		
Labour	Tarik Khan	1,191		
Labour	Gulay Icoz	922		
Reform	Graham Wild	364		
Conservative	Peter Bowring	262		
Liberal Democrats	Paula Palmer	255		
Tower Hamlets Independents	Muhibul Hoque	237		
Tower Hamlets Independents	Avi Islam	236		
TUSC	Clive Heemskerk	209		
Liberal Democrats	Warwick Danks	196		
Tower Hamlets Independents	Nasir Jilani	186		
Conservative	Ahmed Ahmed	150		
Liberal Democrats	Sundar Joshi	146		
Conservative	Ahmedur Rahman	100		
Turnout			%	
Rejected ballots		40		
Aspire hold				
Aspire hold				
Aspire hold				

=== Blackwall & Cubitt Town ===
Blackwall & Cubitt Town (3)
Party	Candidate	Votes	%	±%
Aspire	Bellal Uddin*	1,477		
Aspire	Ahmodur Khan*	1,432		
Aspire	Minara Khatun	1,386		
Independent	Andrew Wood	1,183		
Labour	Smrity Azad	1,105		
Green	Hakan Bas	1,032		
Labour	Alex Stanley	976		
Green	Gary O'Leary	879		
Labour	Anwar Punekar	804		
Reform	Catherine Prescott	684		
Reform	Richard Tudor	679		
Reform	Katherine Walsh	603		
Liberal Democrats	Shelly English	527		
Conservative	Lesley Lincoln	479		
Liberal Democrats	Richard Flowers	425		
Conservative	Yeashir Ahmed	305		
Conservative	Idrees Khan	275		
Tower Hamlets Independents	Zaheed Ahmed	215		
Tower Hamlets Independents	Shah Muhammad	120		
Tower Hamlets Independents	Airin Sobhan	116		
Turnout			%	
Rejected ballots		31		
Aspire hold				
Aspire hold				
Aspire hold				

=== Bow East ===
Bow East (3)
Party	Candidate	Votes	%	±%
Green	Mads Churchhouse	2,777		
Green	Ottilie Swinyard	2,603		
Green	Jonathan Purcell	2,550		
Labour Co-op	Marc Francis*	1,873		
Labour Co-op	Amina Ali*	1,711		
Labour Co-op	Abdi Mohamed*	1,385		
Aspire	Yusuf Abdi	1,120		
Aspire	Mansur Hussain	1,087		
Aspire	Hamida Juti	1,068		
Reform	John Forster	559		
Reform	Gary Taylor	517		
Reform	Kevin Turner	444		
Liberal Democrats	Daniel Bond	262		
Tower Hamlets Independents	Md Chowdhury	186		
Conservative	Georgie Calle	180		
Conservative	Robin Edwards	178		
Liberal Democrats	Dan Lan	170		
Conservative	Jade Kelly	169		
Tower Hamlets Independents	Delwar Hira	140		
Tower Hamlets Independents	Md Islam	131		
Liberal Democrats	Folkert Veenstra	115		
TUSC	Naomi Byron	76		
Turnout			%	
Rejected ballots		36		
Green gain from Labour				
Green gain from Labour				
Green gain from Labour				

=== Bow West ===
Bow West (2)
Party	Candidate	Votes	%	±%
Green	Rupert George	1,821		
Green	Martin Parker	1,506		
Labour Co-op	Asma Begum*	1,347		
Labour Co-op	Kevin Brady	1,088		
Aspire	Syed Ahmad	1,027		
Aspire	Mohammed Ali	1,018		
Reform	Robin Griffiths	383		
Conservative	Debbie Buggs	199		
Tower Hamlets Independents	Sayeda Johora	190		
Liberal Democrats	Janet Ludlow	188		
Conservative	Nick Mitev	165		
Tower Hamlets Independents	Momtaz Islam	141		
Liberal Democrats	Tom Kaneko	116		
Turnout			%	
Rejected ballots		14		
Green gain from Labour				
Green hold				

=== Bromley North ===
Bromley North (2)
Party	Candidate	Votes	%	±%
Aspire	Mohammed Ilyas	1,212		
Aspire	Abdul Mannan*	1,205		
Green	Hirra Adeogun	1,143		
Green	James Meadway	1,000		
Labour	Hamim Chowdhury	791		
Labour	Shaheda Rahman	652		
Tower Hamlets Independents	Abdul Mumin	295		
Reform	John Bullard	232		
Conservative	Alex Reeves	142		
Tower Hamlets Independents	Sheikh Nashar	134		
Liberal Democrats	Simon Herbert	117		
Conservative	Samia Hersi	112		
Liberal Democrats	David Lurie	56		
TUSC	Lauren Riley	35		
Turnout			%	
Rejected ballots		29		
Aspire hold				
Aspire hold				

=== Bromley South ===
Bromley South (2)
Party	Candidate	Votes	%	±%
Labour	Shubo Hussain*	1,495		
Aspire	Bodrul Choudhury*	1,434		
Aspire	Masood Rahman	1,134		
Labour	Lynda Ouazar	878		
Green	Mirren Gidda	796		
Green	Kim Sparks	721		
Tower Hamlets Independents	Liton Ahmed	369		
Reform	Ron Packman	205		
Conservative	Matt Moorhouse	131		
Conservative	David Snowdon	124		
Liberal Democrats	Ian Burns	116		
Liberal Democrats	Alex Warren	113		
Turnout			%	
Rejected ballots		41		
Labour hold				
Aspire hold				

=== Canary Wharf ===
Canary Wharf (2)
Party	Candidate	Votes	%	±%
Aspire	Maium Talukdar*	1,287		
Aspire	Saied Ahmed*	1,244		
Labour	Daniel Lynch	875		
Labour	Suzy Stride	810		
Green	Alexander Bishop	594		
Reform	Jon Bidwell	499		
Green	Alistair Polson	494		
Conservative	Callum Murphy	437		
Reform	Luke Williamson	422		
Conservative	Dominic Nolan	394		
Liberal Democrats	Michael Brand	207		
Liberal Democrats	Finlay Munn	158		
Tower Hamlets Independents	Zahid Hyath	133		
Tower Hamlets Independents	Mo Aboshanab	114		
Turnout			%	
Rejected ballots		24		
Aspire hold				
Aspire hold				

=== Island Gardens ===
Island Gardens (2)
Party	Candidate	Votes	%	±%
Conservative	Peter Golds*	1,206		
Aspire	Sadiqur Rahman	1,143		
Aspire	Syed Ali	1,095		
Green	David Allison	800		
Conservative	Matthew Miles	756		
Green	Paul Burgess	751		
Labour	Mufeedah Bustin*	616		
Reform	Michael Gray	513		
Labour	Ken Murphy	494		
Reform	Ahmed Ibrahim	341		
Tower Hamlets Independents	Ewan Horton	324		
Liberal Democrats	Christian Holland	170		
Tower Hamlets Independents	Kamrul Hashan	138		
Liberal Democrats	Damian Johnson	129		
TUSC	Adam Gillman	37		
Turnout			%	
Rejected ballots		12		
Conservative hold				
Aspire gain from Labour				

=== Lansbury ===
Lansbury (3)
Party	Candidate	Votes	%	±%
Aspire	Iqbal Hossain*	2,251		
Aspire	Foysal Ahmed	2,181		
Aspire	Abul Monsur	1,882		
Green	Simon Levey	1,020		
Labour	Anwar Miah	982		
Labour	Shajia Sultana	948		
Labour	Mohammed Rob	941		
Green	Daniel Smith	912		
Green	John Urpeth	785		
Independent	Jahed Choudhury*	614		
Tower Hamlets Independents	Romna Begum	601		
Reform	Daniel Cunliffe	588		
Reform	Daniel Klop	523		
Reform	Leslie Pearce-Burden	517		
Tower Hamlets Independents	Kaisol Islam	338		
Conservative	Stephen Charge	238		
Conservative	Douglas Oliver	201		
Liberal Democrats	Corie Hawkins	188		
Liberal Democrats	Charles Du Cane	147		
Conservative	Tangai Nyampingidza	137		
Liberal Democrats	Quintin Peppiatt	114		
TUSC	Pete Dickenson	85		
Turnout			%	
Rejected ballots		55		
Aspire hold				
Aspire hold				
Aspire hold				

=== Limehouse ===
Limehouse (1)
Party	Candidate	Votes	%	±%
Labour Co-op	David Edgar	643	31.37	▼8.81
Green	Jurgen Forster	402	19.61	▲11.72
Aspire	Masudul Karim	389	18.98	▼0.17
Reform	Kellen Hadfield	248	12.10	N/A
Conservative	Mark Wolfisz	188	9.17	▼13.07
Liberal Democrats	Jacob Sinkins	130	6.34	▼4.20
Tower Hamlets Independents	Jhahan Ali	50		
Turnout			%	
Rejected ballots		11		
Labour hold				

=== Mile End ===
Mile End (3)
Party	Candidate	Votes	%	±%
Aspire	Rougie Khanom	1,879		
Aspire	Mohammed Mahmud	1,795		
Aspire	Mohammed Mehdi	1,775		
Labour Co-op	Raihan Chowdhury	1,561		
Labour Co-op	Asma Islam*	1,538		
Green	Martin Donkin	1,512		
Green	Amin Rahman	1,494		
Labour Co-op	Leelu Ahmed*	1,429		
Green	Hytham Emam	1,381		
Tower Hamlets Independents	Shah Alam	502		
Independent	Iftakhar Ahmed	375		
Reform	Emilie Martin	351		
Reform	Alan Walker	311		
Tower Hamlets Independents	Christianah Agbabiaka	230		
Liberal Democrats	Rupert Bawden	220		
Liberal Democrats	Catherine Burrows	219		
Conservative	Neil King	215		
Tower Hamlets Independents	Nauman Iqbal	212		
Conservative	Andrew Binns	207		
Liberal Democrats	Conor Hilliard	158		
Conservative	Israt Sawda	115		
Turnout			%	
Rejected ballots		15		
Aspire gain from Labour				
Aspire gain from Labour				
Aspire gain from Labour				

=== Poplar ===
Poplar (1)
Party	Candidate	Votes	%	±%
Aspire	Gulam Choudhury*	982	42.22	
Labour	Zaglul Khan	399	17.15	
Tower Hamlets Independents	Farhad Ahmed	356	15.31	
Green	Bethan Lant	297	12.77	
Reform	Seb Downing	161	6.92	
Conservative	Adrian Thompson	86	3.70	
Liberal Democrats	Alan Palmer	45	1.93	
Turnout			%	
Rejected ballots		43		
Aspire hold				

=== Shadwell ===
Shadwell (2)
Party	Candidate	Votes	%	±%
Aspire	Mohammad Miah	1,621		
Liberal Democrats	Rabina Khan	1,393		
Aspire	Ana Miah*	1,287		
Labour	Muhi Mikdad	1,172		
Labour	Naomi Goldberg	626		
Green	Jarod Hardcastle	563		
Green	Gunther Jancke	541		
Tower Hamlets Independents	Mohammed Sukur	399		
Reform	Mark Mapstone	177		
Reform	Iain Tennant	129		
Conservative	Darly Stafford	116		
Conservative	Kwame Poku	74		
Turnout			%	
Rejected ballots		32		
Aspire hold				
Liberal Democrats gain from Aspire				

=== Spitalfields & Banglatown ===
Spitalfields and Banglatown (2)
Party	Candidate	Votes	%	±%
Aspire	Faysal Ahmed	1,237	16.63	▼26.03
Aspire	Suluk Ahmed*	1,148	15.43	▼27.12
Labour	Shad Chowdhury	1,045	14.05	▼27.27
Independent	Kabir Hussain*	849	11.41	▼31.25
Labour	Rumana Azad	727	9.77	▼20.40
Green	Daniele Pollicino	684	9.19	▲1.35
Green	Maggie Sawant	616	8.28	
Tower Hamlets Independents	Nurul Maleque	489	6.57	
Reform	Cristina Cecchinato	127	1.71	
Liberal Democrats	Gareth Shelton	126	1.69	▼2.91
Liberal Democrats	Robert Adderley	117	1.57	▼4.90
Reform	Helen Biebuyck	112	1.51	
Conservative	Mohammed Miah	84	1.13	▼3.50
Conservative	Terrel Mollel	79	1.06	▼1.45
Turnout		4,069	43.79	▲2.39
Registered electors		9,292		
Aspire hold		Swing		
Aspire hold		Swing		

=== St Dunstan's ===
St Dunstan's (2)
Party	Candidate	Votes	%	±%
Aspire	Shafiq Islam	1,661		
Aspire	Shenaly Miah	1,630		
Labour	Shahanur Khan	1,486		
Green	Stephanie Golder	851		
Labour	Victoria Obaze	709		
Green	Flo Zwiers	643		
Tower Hamlets Independents	Muhammed Kamruzzaman	347		
Reform	Stefano Farina	239		
Reform	Owen Murphy	217		
Tower Hamlets Independents	Mohammad Islam	183		
Liberal Democrats	Alexander Gallagher	112		
Conservative	Gemma Larter	92		
Liberal Democrats	Quentin Croft	90		
Conservative	Olivier Abelhauser	84		
Turnout			%	
Rejected ballots		34		
Aspire gain from Labour				
Aspire gain from Labour				

=== St Katharine's & Wapping ===
St Katharine's and Wapping (2)
Party	Candidate	Votes	%	±%
Labour	Abdal Ullah*	1,303	16.61	
Labour	Victoria Fleur Lupton	1,205	15.36	
Liberal Democrats	Guy Benson	869	11.08	
Liberal Democrats	Seb Villars	772	9.84	
Green	Mareva De Coninck Moyou	598	7.62	
Green	Jolley Harrison Gosnold	585	7.46	
Aspire	Mahbub Alam	509	6.49	
Aspire	Rafique Uddin	501	6.39	
Reform	Pete Holt	363	4.63	
Conservative	Alex Brookes	357	4.55	
Conservative	Jane Elizabeth Emmerson	333	4.25	
Reform	John Charles Hilary Wilkes	311	3.96	
TUSC	Aysha Burton	57	0.73	
Tower Hamlets Independents	Salim Malik	43	0.55	
Tower Hamlets Independents	Mohammad Munshat Habib Chowdhury	38	0.48	
Turnout			%	
Rejected ballots		21		
Labour hold				
Labour hold				

=== Stepney Green ===
Stepney Green (2)
Party	Candidate	Votes	%	±%
Aspire	Sabina Akhtar*	1,940		
Aspire	Abdul Ali*	1,784		
Green	Volker Gulde	698		
Labour	Sanu Miah	693		
Green	Roderick McGlynn	679		
Labour	Nanziba Nasima	574		
Liberal Democrats	Aminur Khan	494		
Reform	Anthony Newland	206		
Reform	Karen Biebuyck	203		
Tower Hamlets Independents	Mohammed Rahman	136		
Liberal Democrats	Simon Tunnicliffe	115		
Conservative	Freddy Simpson	114		
Tower Hamlets Independents	Hassan Diriye	106		
Conservative	Pankaj Goyal	82		
Turnout			%	
Rejected ballots		16		
Aspire hold				
Aspire gain from Labour				

=== Weavers ===
Weavers (2)
Party	Candidate	Votes	%	±%
Aspire	Kabir Ahmed*	1,265		
Labour	Amina Ali	1,156		
Green	Sara Petrai	1,124		
Green	Rakib Ahmed	1,063		
Aspire	Abdul Mahboob	947		
Labour	Dilwar Hussan	799		
Reform	Judy Corstjens	271		
Tower Hamlets Independents	Imran Hossain	171		
Conservative	Elliott Weaver	151		
Liberal Democrats	Edward Long	137		
Tower Hamlets Independents	Abdullah Nazimuddin	125		
Liberal Democrats	Joseph Brazier	123		
Conservative	Sherrill Evarschi	123		
Independent	Abul Zubair	122		
Turnout			%	
Rejected ballots		48		
Aspire hold				
Labour hold				

=== Whitechapel ===
Whitechapel (3)
Party	Candidate	Votes	%	±%
Aspire	Shafi Ahmed*	2,109		
Aspire	Kamrul Hussain*	1,908		
Aspire	Abulkashem Helal	1,802		
Labour	Faroque Ahmed*	1,247		
Green	Phoebe Gill	1,063		
Labour	Shah Ameen	1,059		
Green	Ed Rhodes	892		
Green	Karissa Singh	867		
Labour	Kamrun Shajahan	700		
Liberal Democrats	Mohammed Hannan	273		
Independent	Md. Hossain	250		
Conservative	Debbie Kirk	214		
Reform	Warren Halpin	199		
Tower Hamlets Independents	Md Rahman	186		
Reform	Rick Robinson	179		
Conservative	Garry Ramsden	178		
Conservative	Sonia Mironenko	170		
Liberal Democrats	Wei Qu	165		
Liberal Democrats	Michael Robinson	162		
Tower Hamlets Independents	Md Akbor	133		
Tower Hamlets Independents	Md Bashir	119		
TUSC	Hugo Pierre	72		
Turnout			%	
Rejected ballots		48		
Aspire hold				
Aspire gain from Labour				
Aspire hold				

== Mayor election results ==
Rahman won the election with 38.8% of the vote, winning his third term (and second consecutive term) as Mayor. During Rahman's victory speech, independent candidate Terrence McGrenera was escorted out of the venue by police after holding a sign saying "liar".

2026 Tower Hamlets mayoral election*
Party	Candidate	Votes	%	±%
Aspire	Lutfur Rahman	35,679	38.8	−8.2
Labour	Sirajul Islam	19,454	21.1	−12.1
Green	Hirra Khan Adeogun	19,223	20.9	New
Reform	John Bullard	7,153	7.8	New
Conservative	Dominic Nolan	3,818	4.1	−1.0
Tower Hamlets Independents	Zami Ali	3,156	3.4	New
Liberal Democrats	Mohammed Hannan	2,421	2.6	−5.1
TUSC	Hugo Pierre	638	0.7	−1.0
Independent	Terence McGrenera	524	0.6	New
Turnout		92,075	42.0	+0.1
Aspire hold				

* Percentage change is in comparison to First round results from 2022
