= Bow West =

- Electoral ward for the Tower Hamlets London Borough Council
- Bow West ward boundaries since 2014
- Borough: Tower Hamlets
- County: Greater London
- Population: 13,711 (2021)
- Electorate: 9,036 (2022)
- Area: 1.348 square kilometres (0.520 sq mi)

Current electoral ward
- Created: 2002
- Number of members: 2
- Councillors: Rupert George; Martin Parker
- GSS code: E05009320

Bow West is an electoral ward in the London Borough of Tower Hamlets. The ward was first used in the 2002 elections. It returns councillors to Tower Hamlets London Borough Council.

== Councillors ==
Election	Councillors	
2014	Asma Begum (Labour Party)	Joshua Peck (Labour Party)
2018	Asma Begum (Labour Party)	Val Whitehead (Labour Party)
2022	Asma Begum (Labour Party)	Nathalie Bienfait (Green Party)
2026	Rupert George (Green Party)	Martin Parker (Green Party)

== Tower Hamlets council elections since 2014 ==
There was a revision of ward boundaries in Tower Hamlets in 2014.

=== 2022 election ===
The election took place on 5 May 2022.

2022 Tower Hamlets London Borough Council election: Bow West (2)
Party	Candidate	Votes	%	±%
Labour	Asma Begum	1,601	38.44	−22.28
Green	Nathalie Bienfait	1,253	30.08	+19.94
Labour	Val Whitehead	1,218	29.24	−22.67
Aspire	Ripon Ali	1,035	24.85	+17.90
Green	Alistair Polson	1,004	24.11	+11.40
Aspire	Junu Ali	944	22.67	+16.99
Liberal Democrats	Janet Ludlow	205	4.92	−5.60
Conservative	Desmond Ellerbeck	191	4.59	−4.48
Liberal Democrats	Tom Kaneko	159	3.82	−2.68
Conservative	Mariem Sarghini	157	3.77	−3.41
Rejected ballots		32		
Turnout		4,165	46.09	+2.87
Registered electors		9,036		
Labour hold		Swing		
Green gain from Labour		Swing		

=== 2018 election ===
The election took place on 3 May 2018.

2018 Tower Hamlets London Borough Council election: Bow West (2)
Party	Candidate	Votes	%	±%
Labour	Asma Begum	2,384	60.72	+18.30
Labour	Val Whitehead	2,038	51.91	+0.07
Green	Alistair Polson	499	12.71	+0.98
Liberal Democrats	Liza Franchi	413	10.52	N/A
Green	Anne Silberbauer	398	10.14	−1.74
Conservative	Samuel Hall	356	9.07	−4.26
Conservative	Agnieszka Kendrick	282	7.18	−2.19
Aspire	Habibur Rahman	273	6.95	N/A
Liberal Democrats	Altaf Hussain	255	6.50	−0.47
Aspire	Mohammed Tanim	223	5.68	N/A
Rejected ballots		27		
Turnout		3,953	43.22	
Registered electors		9,146		
Labour hold		Swing		
Labour hold		Swing		

=== 2014 election ===
The election took place on 22 May 2014.

2014 Tower Hamlets London Borough Council election: Bow West (2)
Party	Candidate	Votes	%	±%
Labour	Joshua Peck	2,439	51.84	
Labour	Asma Begum	1,996	42.42	
Tower Hamlets First	Jainal Chowdhury	702	14.98	
Conservative	Matt Smith	627	13.33	
Independent	Anwar Khan	619	13.16	
Green	Louise Whitmore	559	11.88	
Green	Alistair Polson	552	11.73	
Conservative	S M Safiul Azam	441	9.37	
Liberal Democrats	Altaf Hussain	328	6.97	
Turnout		4,737	52.33	
Labour win (new boundaries)				
Labour win (new boundaries)				
