= Mile End (ward) =

Electoral ward in London

- Electoral ward for the Tower Hamlets London Borough Council
- Mile End ward boundaries since 2014
- Borough: Tower Hamlets
- County: Greater London
- Population: 21,649 (2021)
- Electorate: 13,885 (2022)
- Area: 1.132 square kilometres (0.437 sq mi)

Current electoral ward
- Created: 2014
- Number of members: 3
- Councillors: Sabina Khan; Leelu Ahmed; Mohammad Chowdhury
- GSS code: E05009327

Mile End is an electoral ward in the London Borough of Tower Hamlets. The ward was first used in the 2014 elections. It returns councillors to Tower Hamlets London Borough Council.

== List of councillors ==
| Seat | Councillor | Took office | Left office | Party | Election |
|---|---|---|---|---|---|
| 1 | Shah Alam | 2014 | 2018 | Tower Hamlets First | 2014 |
| 2 | David Edgar | 2014 | 2022 | Labour | 2014, 2018 |
| 3 | Rachael Saunders | 2014 | 2018 | Labour | 2014 |
| 1 | Asma Islam | 2018 | 2022 | Labour | 2018 |
| 3 | Puru Miah | 2018 | 2022 | Labour | 2018 |
| 1 | Sabina Khan (Note: Sabina Khan changed parties in 2024) | 2022 | Incumbent | Labour | 2022 |
| 1 | Sabina Khan | 2022 | Incumbent | Aspire | 2022 |
| 2 | Leelu Ahmed | 2022 | Incumbent | Labour | 2022 |
| 3 | Mohammad Chowdhury | 2022 | Incumbent | Labour | 2022 |

== Tower Hamlets council elections ==
There was a revision of ward boundaries in Tower Hamlets in 2014.

=== 2022 election ===
The election took place on 5 May 2022.

2022 Tower Hamlets London Borough Council election: Mile End (3)
| Party | Candidate | Votes | % | ±% |
|---|---|---|---|---|
| Labour | Sabina Khan | 2,530 | 42.59 | −7.71 |
| Labour | Leelu Ahmed | 2,120 | 35.69 | −12.12 |
| Labour | Mohammad Chowdhury | 2,119 | 35.67 | −3.34 |
| Aspire | Helal Miah | 2,041 | 34.36 | +16.47 |
| Aspire | Azad Miah | 1,956 | 32.93 | +16.39 |
| Aspire | Haji Habib | 1,900 | 31.99 | +17.60 |
| Green | Jack Gibbons | 562 | 9.46 | +0.30 |
| Green | Simon Levey | 460 | 7.74 | +0.50 |
| Green | Gunther Jancke | 456 | 7.68 | N/A |
| Liberal Democrats | Tabitha Potts | 378 | 6.36 | +0.22 |
| Conservative | Craig Aston | 313 | 5.27 | −2.49 |
| Liberal Democrats | Horia Bogdan | 310 | 5.22 | −1.61 |
| Conservative | Shah Alam | 249 | 4.19 | −1.17 |
| Liberal Democrats | Wei Qu | 240 | 4.04 | −1.95 |
| Conservative | Srikanth Rajgopal | 173 | 2.91 | −1.61 |
| Rejected ballots | | 62 | | |
| Turnout | | 5,940 | 42.78 | +1.99 |
| Registered electors | | 13,885 | | |
| Labour hold | | Swing | | |
| Labour hold | | Swing | | |
| Labour hold | | Swing | | |

=== 2018 election ===
The election took place on 3 May 2018.

2018 Tower Hamlets London Borough Council election: Mile End (3)
| Party | Candidate | Votes | % | ±% |
|---|---|---|---|---|
| Labour | Asma Islam | 2,646 | 50.30 | +13.91 |
| Labour | David Edgar | 2,515 | 47.81 | +9.23 |
| Labour | Puru Miah | 2,052 | 39.01 | +8.37 |
| PATH | Shah Alam | 1,142 | 21.71 | −17.67 |
| Aspire | Helal Miah | 941 | 17.89 | N/A |
| Aspire | Joynul Bashar | 870 | 16.54 | N/A |
| Aspire | Mustak Syed | 757 | 14.39 | −16.16 |
| PATH | Mohammad Obeaidur Rahman | 539 | 10.25 | N/A |
| Green | Ciaran Cusack | 482 | 9.16 | N/A |
| Conservative | Gracie Browning | 408 | 7.76 | −2.40 |
| Green | Aaron Parr | 381 | 7.24 | N/A |
| Liberal Democrats | Jonathan Fryer | 359 | 6.83 | −1.68 |
| Liberal Democrats | Tabitha Potts | 323 | 6.14 | N/A |
| Liberal Democrats | Richard MacMillan | 315 | 5.99 | N/A |
| Conservative | Nick Millward | 282 | 5.36 | −4.35 |
| Conservative | Carlos Soares de Freitas | 238 | 4.52 | −3.07 |
| PATH | Mohammad Sajjadur Rahman | 178 | 3.38 | N/A |
| Rejected ballots | | 57 | | |
| Turnout | | 5,317 | 40.79 | |
| Registered electors | | 13,036 | | |
| Labour gain from Tower Hamlets First | | Swing | | |
| Labour hold | | Swing | | |
| Labour hold | | Swing | | |

=== 2014 election ===
The election took place on 22 May 2014.

2014 Tower Hamlets London Borough Council election : Mile End (3)
| Party | Candidate | Votes | % | ±% |
|---|---|---|---|---|
| Tower Hamlets First | Shah Alam | 2,315 | 39.38 | |
| Labour | David Edgar | 2,268 | 38.58 | |
| Labour | Rachael Saunders | 2,139 | 36.39 | |
| Tower Hamlets First | Mohammed Ali | 2,052 | 34.91 | |
| Labour | Motin Uz-Zaman | 1,801 | 30.64 | |
| Tower Hamlets First | Mustak Syed | 1,796 | 30.55 | |
| Conservative | Naomi Snowdon | 597 | 10.16 | |
| Conservative | Mushtak Abdullah | 571 | 9.71 | |
| Liberal Democrats | Andy Hallett | 500 | 8.51 | |
| Conservative | Jewel Islam | 446 | 7.59 | |
| Independent | Hafiz Choudhury | 383 | 6.52 | |
| TUSC | Arzoo Miah | 165 | 2.81 | |
| Turnout | | 5,974 | 49.58 | |
| Tower Hamlets First win (new seat) | | | | |
| Labour win (new seat) | | | | |
| Labour win (new seat) | | | | |
