= Bromley South (ward) =

- Electoral ward for the Tower Hamlets London Borough Council
- Bromley South ward boundaries since 2014
- Borough: Tower Hamlets
- County: Greater London
- Population: 13,964 (2021)
- Electorate: 9,085 (2022)
- Area: 0.6777 square kilometres (0.2617 sq mi)

Current electoral ward
- Created: 2014
- Councillors: 2
- GSS code: E05009322

Bromley South is an electoral ward in the London Borough of Tower Hamlets. The ward was first used in the 2014 elections. It returns councillors to Tower Hamlets London Borough Council.

== Tower Hamlets council elections ==
There was a revision of ward boundaries in Tower Hamlets in 2014.

=== 2022 election ===
The election took place on 5 May 2022.

2022 Tower Hamlets London Borough Council election: Bromley South (2)
Party	Candidate	Votes	%	±%
Labour	Shubo Hussain	1,772	44.10	−3.36
Aspire	Bodrul Choudhury	1,616	40.22	+13.17
Aspire	Ikbal Hussain	1,478	36.78	+12.78
Labour	Jenny Symmons	1,330	33.10	−13.64
Green	Barney Green	239	5.95	−0.11
Green	Rob Curry	233	5.80	+1.39
Liberal Democrats	Joshua Casswell	207	5.15	+0.07
Conservative	Stephen Charge	143	3.56	−1.49
Conservative	Indigo Atherton	139	3.46	+0.09
Liberal Democrats	David Vinas	76	1.89	−2.49
Rejected ballots		45		
Turnout		4,018	44.23	−0.23
Registered electors		9,085		
Labour hold		Swing		
Aspire gain from Labour		Swing		

=== 2018 election ===
The election took place on 3 May 2018.

2018 Tower Hamlets London Borough Council election: Bromley South (2)
Party	Candidate	Votes	%	±%
Labour	Danny Hassell	1,786	47.46	+11.96
Labour	Helal Uddin	1,759	46.74	+4.00
Aspire	Bodrul Choudhury	1,018	27.05	N/A
Aspire	Kabir Hussain	903	24.00	N/A
PATH	Ras Uddin	271	7.20	N/A
Green	Caroline Fenton	228	6.06	−3.31
Liberal Democrats	Josh Casswell	191	5.08	−1.80
Conservative	Ben Crompton	190	5.05	−2.32
Green	Florian Herzberg	166	4.41	N/A
Liberal Democrats	Emily Stevenson	165	4.38	N/A
Conservative	Zachary Harris	127	3.37	−0.81
Rejected ballots		47		
Turnout		3,326		
Registered electors		7,461		
Labour hold		Swing		
Labour hold		Swing		

=== 2014 election ===
The election took place on 22 May 2014.

2014 Tower Hamlets London Borough Council election : Bromley South (2)
Party	Candidate	Votes	%	±%
Labour	Helal Uddin	1,565	42.74	
Labour	Danny Hassell	1,300	35.50	
Tower Hamlets First	Syeda Choudhury	1,290	35.23	
Tower Hamlets First	Kobir Ali	1,269	34.65	
Green	Ben Hancocks	343	9.37	
Conservative	Frank Thienel	270	7.37	
Liberal Democrats	Stephen Clarke	252	6.88	
Conservative	Srikanth Rajgopal	153	4.18	
Turnout		3,697	49.44	
Labour win (new seat)				
Labour win (new seat)				
