= Island Gardens (ward) =

- Electoral ward for the Tower Hamlets London Borough Council
- Island Gardens ward boundaries since 2014
- Borough: Tower Hamlets
- County: Greater London
- Population: 15,304 (2021)
- Electorate: 9,840 (2022)
- Area: 0.9134 square kilometres (0.3527 sq mi)

Current electoral ward
- Created: 2014
- Number of members: 2
- Councillors: Peter Golds; Sadiqur Rahman
- GSS code: E05009324

Island Gardens is an electoral ward in the London Borough of Tower Hamlets. The ward was first used in the 2014 elections. It returns councillors to Tower Hamlets London Borough Council.

== Councillors ==
Election	Councillors	
2014	Peter Golds (Conservative Party)	Andrew Cregan (Labour Party)
2018	Peter Golds (Conservative Party)	Mufeedah Bustin (Labour Party)
2022	Peter Golds (Conservative Party)	Mufeedah Bustin (Labour Party)
2026	Peter Golds (Conservative Party)	Sadiqur Rahman (Aspire)

== Tower Hamlets council elections ==
There was a revision of ward boundaries in Tower Hamlets in 2014.

=== 2022 election ===
The election took place on 5 May 2022.

2022 Tower Hamlets London Borough Council election: Island Gardens (2)
Party	Candidate	Votes	%	±%
Conservative	Peter Golds	1,092	27.66	−1.33
Labour	Mufeedah Bustin	1,013	25.66	−1.37
Aspire	Sadiqur Rahman	971	24.59	+14.90
Aspire	Syed Ali	936	23.71	+16.32
Conservative	Callum Murphy	892	22.59	+2.21
Labour	Zaglul Khan	864	21.88	−2.80
Green	David Allison	516	13.07	+6.42
Liberal Democrats	Shelly English	489	12.39	−3.69
Liberal Democrats	Andrew Cregan	362	9.17	−14.38
Rejected ballots		39		
Turnout		3,948	40.12	−0.96
Registered electors		9,840		
Conservative hold		Swing		
Labour hold		Swing		

=== 2018 election ===
The election took place on 3 May 2018.

2018 Tower Hamlets London Borough Council election: Island Gardens (2)
Party	Candidate	Votes	%	±%
Labour	Mufeedah Bustin	1,111	29.10	−2.79
Conservative	Peter Golds	1,107	28.99	−5.49
Labour	Shubo Hussain	1,032	27.03	+2.65
Liberal Democrats	Elaine Bagshaw	899	23.55	+16.86
Conservative	James Strawson	778	20.38	−10.38
Liberal Democrats	Shelly English	614	16.08	N/A
Aspire	Sadiqur Bablu Rahman	370	9.69	N/A
Aspire	Sohid Chowdhury	282	7.39	N/A
Green	Victoria Gladwin	279	7.31	N/A
Green	David Allison	254	6.65	N/A
PATH	Abdul Manik	197	5.16	N/A
Rejected ballots		35		
Turnout		3853	41.08	
Registered electors		9,380		
Labour hold		Swing		
Conservative hold		Swing		

=== 2014 election ===
The election took place on 22 May 2014.

2014 Tower Hamlets London Borough Council election : Island Gardens (2)
Party	Candidate	Votes	%	±%
Conservative	Peter Golds	1,345	34.48	
Labour	Andrew Cregan	1,244	31.89	
Conservative	Gloria Thienel	1,200	30.76	
Labour	Raju Rahman	951	24.38	
Tower Hamlets First	Bellal Uddin	648	16.61	
Tower Hamlets First	Kathy McTasney	515	13.20	
UKIP	Wayne Lochner	464	11.89	
Liberal Democrats	Doug Oliver	261	6.69	
TUSC	John Peers	100	2.56	
Turnout		3,913	43.29	
Conservative win (new seat)				
Labour win (new seat)				
