= Poplar (ward) =

- Electoral ward for the Tower Hamlets London Borough Council
- Poplar ward boundaries since 2014
- Borough: Tower Hamlets
- County: Greater London
- Population: 8,069 (2021)
- Electorate: 4,940 (2022)
- Area: 0.5355 square kilometres (0.2068 sq mi)

Current electoral ward
- Created: 2014
- Councillors: 1
- GSS code: E05009328

Poplar is an electoral ward in the London Borough of Tower Hamlets. The ward was first used in the 2014 elections. It returns councillors to Tower Hamlets London Borough Council.

== Tower Hamlets council elections ==
There was a revision of ward boundaries in Tower Hamlets in 2014.

=== 2022 election ===
The election took place on 5 May 2022.

2022 Tower Hamlets London Borough Council election: Poplar (1)
Party	Candidate	Votes	%	±%
Aspire	Gulam Choudhury	1,134	53.07	+26.25
Labour	Zenith Rahman	602	28.17	−8.67
Green	Rebecca Binns	152	7.11	N/A
Conservative	Dominic Nolan	131	6.13	−1.07
Liberal Democrats	Habibur Tafader	118	5.52	+0.69
Majority		532		
Rejected ballots		48		
Turnout		2,137	44.25	
Registered electors		4,940		
Aspire gain from Labour		Swing		

=== 2018 election ===
The election took place on 3 May 2018.

2018 Tower Hamlets London Borough Council election: Poplar (1)
Party	Candidate	Votes	%	±%
Labour	Sufia Alam	732	36.84	−0.16
Aspire	Gulum Choudhury	533	26.82	−17.42
PATH	Dulal Uddin	445	22.40	N/A
Conservative	Harry Scoffin	143	7.20	+0.10
Liberal Democrats	John Denniston	96	4.83	+2.84
Independent	Luke Connolly	38	1.91	N/A
Majority		199		
Rejected ballots		57		
Turnout		2,044	45.86	
Registered electors		4,457		
Labour gain from Tower Hamlets First		Swing		

=== 2014 election ===
The election took place on 22 May 2014.

2014 Tower Hamlets London Borough Council election : Poplar (1)
Party	Candidate	Votes	%	±%
Tower Hamlets First	Gulam Choudhury	910	44.24	
Labour	Abdul Chowdhury	761	37.00	
UKIP	Anna Mignano	159	7.73	
Conservative	James Robinson	146	7.10	
Liberal Democrats	Richard Macmillan	41	1.99	
TUSC	Naomi Byron	40	1.94	
Turnout		2,090	49.64	
Tower Hamlets First win (new seat)				
