= Canary Wharf (ward) =

Electoral ward in London, England

- Electoral ward for the Tower Hamlets London Borough Council
- Canary Wharf ward boundaries since 2014
- Borough: Tower Hamlets
- County: Greater London
- Population: 17,976 (2021)
- Electorate: 11,389 (2022)
- Major settlements: Millwall
- Area: 1.409 square kilometres (0.544 sq mi)

Current electoral ward
- Created: 2014
- Councillors: 2
- GSS code: E05009323

Canary Wharf is an electoral ward in the London Borough of Tower Hamlets. The ward was first used in the 2014 elections. It returns councillors to Tower Hamlets London Borough Council. It covers a wider area of Tower Hamlets beyond the privately owned Canary Wharf.

== Tower Hamlets council elections ==
There was a revision of ward boundaries in Tower Hamlets in 2014.

=== 2022 election ===
The election took place on 5 May 2022.

2022 Tower Hamlets London Borough Council election: Canary Wharf (2)
Party	Candidate	Votes	%	±%
Aspire	Maium Talukdar	1,164	31.66	+9.00
Aspire	Saled Ahmed	1,023	27.83	+13.07
Independent	Andrew Wood	993	27.01	−1.58
Labour Co-op	Adam Allnutt	885	24.08	−0.52
Labour Co-op	Shajia Sultana	846	23.01	−1.53
Conservative	Francis Germaine-Powell	492	13.38	−15.21
Conservative	Samia Hersey	408	11.10	−13.31
Liberal Democrats	Morgan Jones	363	9.87	−0.33
Liberal Democrats	Mohammed Hannan	270	7.34	+0.15
Rejected ballots		26		
Turnout		3,676	32.28	−1.61
Registered electors		11,389		
Aspire gain from Conservative		Swing		
Aspire gain from Labour		Swing		

=== 2018 election ===
The election took place on 3 May 2018.

2018 Tower Hamlets London Borough Council election: Canary Wharf (2)
Party	Candidate	Votes	%	±%
Conservative	Andrew Wood	883	28.59	−0.22
Labour	Kyrsten Perry	760	24.60	−1.96
Labour	Anisur Anis	758	24.54	−1.52
Conservative	Tom Randall	754	24.41	−1.52
Aspire	Mohammed Maium Miah Talukdar	700	22.66	−4.83
Aspire	Helen Begum	456	14.76	N/A
Liberal Democrats	Kevin Lyons	315	10.20	+4.20
PATH	Yusuf Ahmed	236	7.64	N/A
Liberal Democrats	Gareth Shelton	222	7.19	N/A
Green	Andrew Grey	215	6.96	N/A
Independent	Natasha Bolter	141	4.56	N/A
Green	Alasdair Blackwell	137	4.44	N/A
Rejected ballots		12		
Turnout		3,101	33.89	
Registered electors		9,150		
Conservative hold		Swing		
Labour gain from Tower Hamlets First		Swing		

=== 2014 election ===
The election took place on 22 May 2014.

2014 Tower Hamlets London Borough Council election : Canary Wharf (2)
Party	Candidate	Votes	%	±%
Conservative	Andrew Wood	869	28.81	
Tower Hamlets First	Maium Miah	829	27.49	
Labour	Debbie Simone	801	26.56	
Labour	Shubo Hussain	786	26.06	
Conservative	Ahmed Hussain	782	25.93	
Tower Hamlets First	John Cray	592	19.63	
UKIP	Mark Webber	327	10.84	
Liberal Democrats	Stephen Toal	181	6.00	
TUSC	Neil Cafferky	58	1.92	
Turnout		3,042	36.53	
Conservative win (new seat)				
Tower Hamlets First win (new seat)				
