= 2022 Tower Hamlets London Borough Council election =

2022 Tower Hamlets Council election
- 5 May 2022

All 45 seats to Tower Hamlets London Borough Council 23 seats needed for a majority
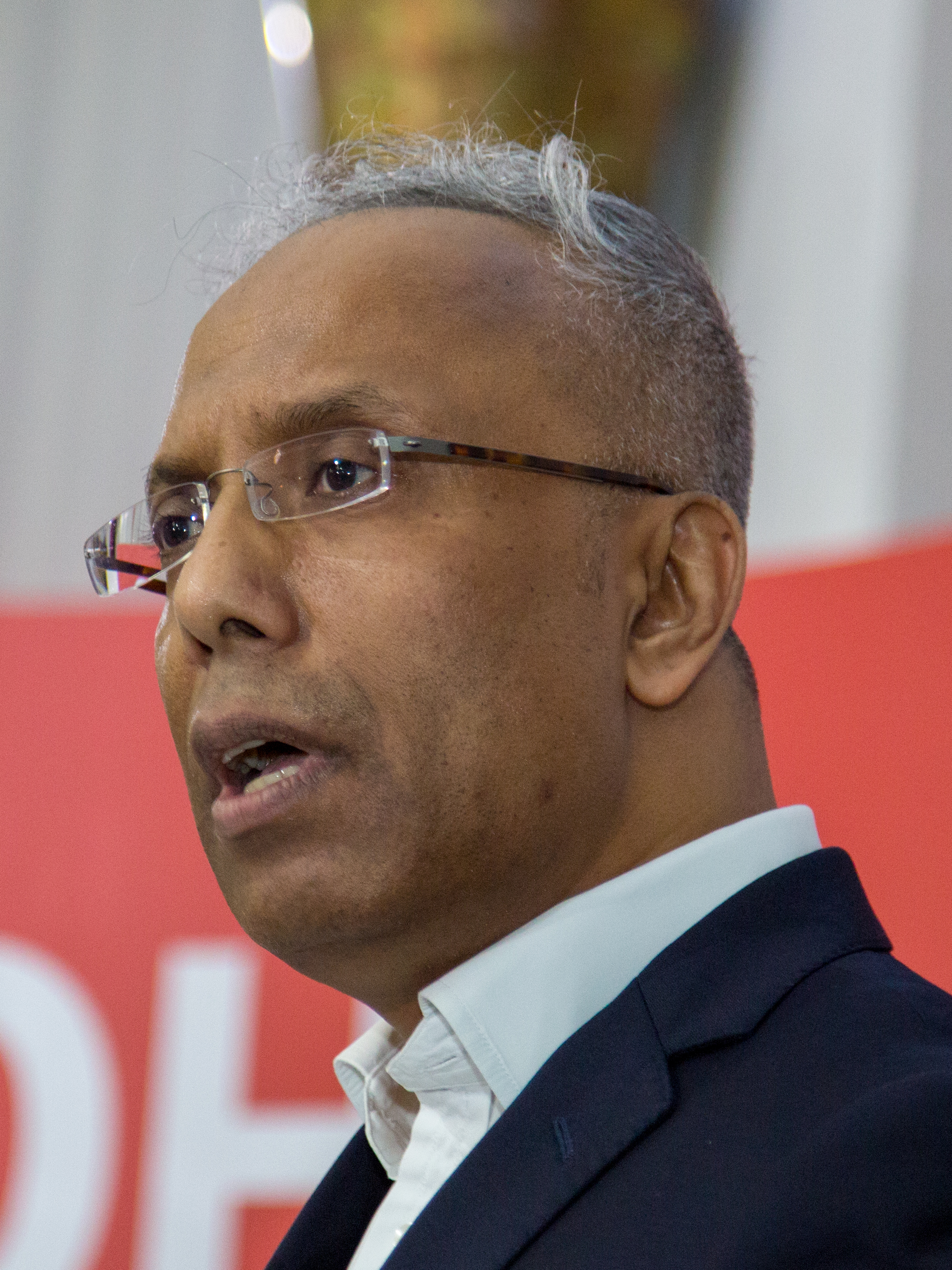

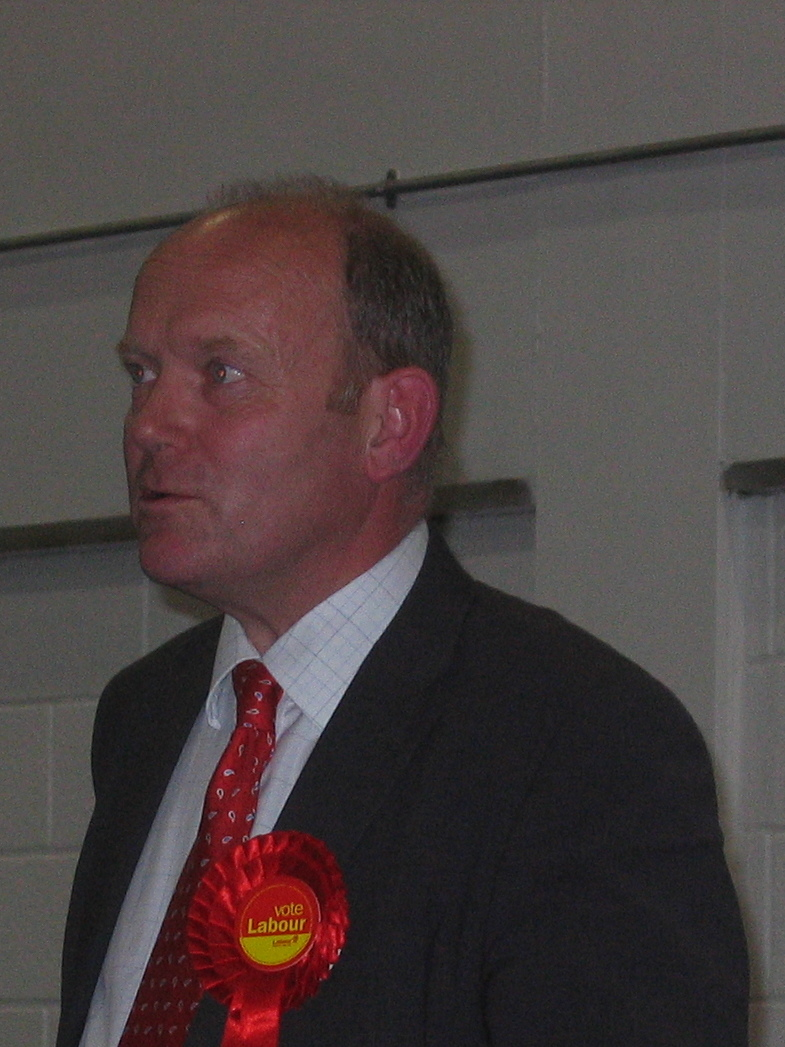
	First party	Second party
Leader	Lutfur Rahman	John Biggs
Party	Aspire	Labour
Last election	0 seats, 15.4%	42 seats, 46.1%
Seats won	24	19
Seat change	▲24	▼23
Popular vote	69,141	68,347
Percentage	36.9%	36.5%
Swing	▲21.5%	▼9.6%
	Third party	Fourth party
Leader	Nathalie Sylvia Bienfait	Elliott Weaver
Party	Green	Conservative
Last election	0 seats, 8.6%	2 seats, 9.9%
Seats won	1	1
Seat change	▲1	▼1
Popular vote	16,620	14,380
Percentage	9%	7.6%
Swing	▲0.4%	▼2.3%
- Map showing the results of the 2022 Tower Hamlets London Borough Council election. Aspire in orange, Labour in red, Conservatives in blue and Greens in green.
council control before election
Labour
Subsequent council control
Aspire

The 2022 Tower Hamlets London Borough Council election took place on 5 May 2022. All 45 members of Tower Hamlets London Borough Council were elected. The elections took place alongside local elections in the other London boroughs and elections to local authorities across the United Kingdom.

In the previous election in 2018, the Labour Party regained control of the council from no overall control, winning 42 out of the 45 seats with the Conservative Party as the principal opposition with two of the remaining three seats. The election coincided with an election for the mayor of Tower Hamlets. In the 2022 elections, the Aspire Party gained control of the council from Labour, winning 24 seats, and also won the mayoralty. Reduced to 19 seats, this is the lowest ever number of seats Labour have ever held in the history of Tower Hamlets; the Conservatives retained one seat, while the Green Party gained one seat.

== Background ==
=== History ===
Result of the 2018 borough election

The thirty-two London boroughs were established in 1965 by the London Government Act 1963. They are the principal authorities in Greater London and have responsibilities including education, housing, planning, highways, social services, libraries, recreation, waste, environmental health and revenue collection. Some powers are shared with the Greater London Authority, which also manages passenger transport, police, and fire.

Since its formation, Tower Hamlets has generally been under Labour control. The SDP–Liberal Alliance won a majority of seats in the 1986 election, and the newly formed Liberal Democrats won a majority in the 1990 election. There was also a period of no overall control from 2014 to 2018. From 1990 to 2006, all councillors elected to the council were Labour or Liberal Democrats. In the 2006 election, Labour maintained its majority by winning 26 seats, but the new Respect Party won twelve seats, with the Conservatives on seven and the Liberal Democrats on six. In the 2010 election Respect lost all but one of its seats, with Labour winning 41, the Conservatives winning eight and the Liberal Democrats winning one. Respect was the only party to advocate a change in executive arrangements at the council by the introduction of a directly elected mayor of Tower Hamlets. A mayoral petition was successfully arranged by the Respect activist Abjol Miah, which was successful.

The Labour councillor Lutfur Rahman, who had been leader of the council from 2008 until he was replaced in 2010 after a Channel 4 documentary linked him to the Islamic Forum of Europe, was selected as his party's candidate for the mayoralty. He was removed as the candidate by the National Executive Committee of the Labour Party after "very serious allegations" about the selection. He subsequently ran as an independent candidate with support from Respect. Rahman was elected in the October 2010 election with more than half of the vote in the first round. Rahman established a new political party called Tower Hamlets First in 2013. He ran for re-election as the Tower Hamlets First candidate in 2014, being re-elected in the second round against the Labour candidate John Biggs. In the concurrent council election, Tower Hamlets First won 18 seats, with Labour on 22 and the Conservatives on 5, resulting in no overall control of the council.

In 2015, Rahman was removed from office and his election was declared void after he was found guilty of electoral fraud. He was barred from seeking re-election for five years. Tower Hamlets First was de-registered as a political party by the Electoral Commission shortly after. In the 2015 re-run of the mayoral election, Rahman endorsed the independent candidate Rabina Khan. Khan had been elected as a Labour councillor in 2010 but had been suspended for supporting Rahman's initial 2010 election, and had been re-elected in the 2014 council election as a Tower Hamlets First councillor. Biggs won the election. The former Tower Hamlets First councillors formed the Tower Hamlets Independent Group. Khan formed the breakaway group the People's Alliance of Tower Hamlets (PATH) with some other Tower Hamlets Independent Group councillors, which was formally registered in 2018. The remaining Tower Hamlets Independent Group councillors formed the new party Aspire.

In the most recent mayoral election in 2018, Khan stood as the PATH candidate, coming second, and Ohid Ahmed stood for Aspire. Ahmed had been endorsed by Rahman. Biggs was successfully re-elected for the Labour Party with 48.4% of the vote in the first round and 72.7% of the vote after second preferences were taken into account. In the concurrent council election, Labour won 42 seats with 46.1% of the vote, while the Conservatives won two seats with 9.9% of the vote across the borough. Khan was elected as a councillor for PATH, with her party winning 11.3% of the vote across the borough. Aspire lost all their representation, winning no seats with 15.4% of the vote. The Liberal Democrats received 8.6% of the vote and the Green Party received 7.9% of the vote, but neither won any seats.

=== Council term ===
Rabina Khan disbanded PATH in August 2018 and switched to the Liberal Democrats. Mohammed Pappu, a councillor for Blackwall and Cubitt town, was suspended from the Labour Party in October 2018 after sharing antisemitic posts on social media. In the following month, he apologised, saying that he had not read the posts properly and offered to undergo training. A Labour councillor for Lansbury ward, Mohammad Harun, resigned in December 2018 after Biggs ordered an investigation into allegations of housing fraud. A Labour councillor for Shadwell ward, Ruhul Amin, resigned in January 2019 because he was moving to Bangladesh. Both by-elections took place in February 2019, with Rajib Ahmed holding Lansbury for Labour and Ohid Ahmed coming in second place for Aspire. The Aspire candidate Mohammad Harun Miah won the by-election in Shadwell, with the Labour candidate Asik Rahman coming in second place. Asik Rahman had apologised during the campaign for liking the Facebook page of Zakir Naik, a preacher who was banned from entering the UK.

The leader of the Conservatives on the council, Andrew Wood, resigned from his party to sit as an independent in February 2020 while remaining in the Conservative group on the council. He cited the Conservative government's approach to Brexit and decision to override guidance to approve a controversial housing development in the borough. John Pierce, a Labour councillor for Weavers ward, died in June 2021. He had been first elected in 2012. A by-election to fill the seat was held in August 2021, which was won by the Aspire candidate Kabir Ahmed. A Conservative councillor credited Aspire's victory to the Labour council's implementation of low traffic neighbourhood schemes, which Ahmed promised to end if Aspire won the 2022 council election.

=== Mayoral referendum ===
Tower Hamlets held a referendum in May 2021 on whether to maintain the system of directly electing a mayor, or to return to the leader-and-cabinet model where councillors elect a leader. Biggs and the Labour Party, the Conservatives, the Liberal Democrats including Rabina Khan, and the Green Party campaigned in favour of ending the mayoral system, while Rahman campaigned to keep it. The outcome of the referendum was to continue with the mayoral system, with 77.8% of votes in favour.

Tower Hamlets Governance Referendum 6 May 2021
Choice	Votes	%
Elected mayor	63,046	77.83
Leader-and-cabinet system	17,957	22.17
Total	81,003	100.00
Valid votes	81,003	95.92
Invalid/blank votes	3,444	4.08
Total votes	84,447	100.00
Registered voters/turnout		40.1

== Campaign ==
=== Council election ===
The communities minister Kemi Badenoch wrote to the Metropolitan Police and Electoral Commission about concerns over the possibility of election fraud and family voting in Tower Hamlets.

=== Council candidates ===
The Labour Party, Conservative Party and Liberal Democrats all fielded a full slate of 45 candidates each. Aspire put forward 44 candidates - missing one candidate in the Whitechapel ward where Shahed Ali stood for the "Resurrection Young People. In Sha Allah" party. The Green Party fielded 39 candidates, with both the SDP and TUSC standing one candidate each.

The election also saw the first openly transgender candidate stand in Tower Hamlets with Rebecca Jones of the Liberal Democrats in Bethnal Green West.

=== Mayoral election ===
The Labour mayor of Tower Hamlets, John Biggs, sought re-election. In January 2022, the Liberal Democrat councillor Rabina Khan was announced as her party's candidate for the mayoralty. In the same month, the independent councillor Andrew Wood, who had resigned from the Conservative group in 2020, announced he would stand for election as both a councillor and mayor. Wood said the council should spend more of its reserves building homes, schools and bridges. The former mayor of the borough, Lutfur Rahman, announced his candidacy for the Aspire party in February 2022. Rahman's five-year ban from standing for election, having been found guilty by an election court of "corrupt and illegal practices", had lapsed. He was endorsed at his formal campaign launch in March by the former mayor of London Ken Livingstone and the peer Pola Uddin. Elliott Weaver stood as the Conservative mayoral candidate.

== Electoral process ==
Tower Hamlets, like other London borough councils, elects all of its councillors at once every four years. The previous election took place in 2018. The election took place by multi-member first-past-the-post voting, with each ward being represented by two or three councillors. Electors had as many votes as there are councillors to be elected in their ward, with the top two or three being elected.

All registered electors (British, Irish, Commonwealth and European Union citizens) living in London aged 18 or over were entitled to vote in the election. People who lived at two addresses in different councils, such as university students with different term-time and holiday addresses, were entitled to be registered for and vote in elections in both local authorities. Voting in-person at polling stations took place from 7:00 to 22:00 on election day, and voters were able to apply for postal votes or proxy votes in advance of the election.

== Council composition ==
Council composition after the 2018 election

Council composition ahead of the 2022 election

Council composition following the 2022 election

After 2018 election		Before 2022 election		After 2022 election	
Party	Seats	Party	Seats	Party	Seats
Labour	42	Labour	40	Labour	19
Conservative	2	Aspire	2	Aspire	24
PATH	1	Conservative	1	Conservative	1
		Liberal Democrats	1	Green	1
		Independent	1		

== Results summary ==
2022 Tower Hamlets London Borough Council election
Party	Seats	Gains	Losses	Net gain/loss	Seats %	Votes %	Votes	+/−
Aspire	24	24	0	▲24	53.3	36.9	69,141	+21.5
Labour	19	0	23	▼23	42.2	36.5	68,347	-9.6
Green	1	1	0	▲1	2.2	8.9	16,620	+1.0
Conservative	1	0	1	▼1	2.2	7.7	14,380	-2.2
Liberal Democrats	0	0	0	Steady	0.0	8.9	16,691	+0.3
Independent	0	0	0	Steady	0.0	0.9	1,604	+0.6
TUSC	0	0	0	Steady	0.0	0.2	301	N/A
SDP	0	0	0	Steady	0.0	0.0	39	N/A

== Results by ward ==
Asterisks denote incumbent councillors seeking re-election. Unless otherwise noted, the councillors seeking re-election were elected in 2018.

=== Bethnal Green East ===
The Bethnal Green ward was renamed Bethnal Green East in 2022 with no changes to the boundaries.

Bethnal Green East (3)
Party	Candidate	Votes	%	±%
Labour	Sirajul Islam*	2,395	40.55	−9.50
Labour	Rebeka Sultana	2,166	36.67	−14.90
Aspire	Ahmodul Kabir	2,153	36.45	+27.59
Aspire	Syed Abdullah	2,112	35.76	+28.79
Labour	Eve McQuillan*	2,076	35.15	−14.66
Aspire	Nurul Gaffar	2,001	33.88	+27.57
Green	Rupert George	720	12.19	+0.20
Green	Jack Mathews	609	10.31	+0.23
Green	Daniel Smith	585	9.91	+0.50
Liberal Democrats	Ryan James	313	5.30	−1.33
Conservative	Benjamin Hack	289	4.89	−0.26
Conservative	Samuel Hall	273	4.62	−0.53
Conservative	Dinah George	271	4.59	−0.56
Liberal Democrats	Eugene Lynch	233	3.95	−2.19
Liberal Democrats	Callum Robertson	232	3.93	−1.78
Rejected ballots		47		
Turnout		5,906	42.87	+0.96
Registered electors		13,778		
Labour hold		Swing		
Labour hold		Swing		
Aspire gain from Labour		Swing		

=== Bethnal Green West ===
The St Peters ward was renamed Bethnal Green West in 2022 with no changes to the boundaries.

Bethnal Green West (3)
Party	Candidate	Votes	%	±%
Aspire	Musthak Ahmed	2,744	44.97	+26.91
Aspire	Abu Chowdhury	2,673	43.81	+27.15
Aspire	Rahman Amin	2,562	41.99	+27.63
Labour	Sufia Alam	2,123	34.79	−8.58
Labour	Kevin Brady*	1,881	30.83	−15.63
Labour	Mizan Chaudhury	1,724	28.25	−13.23
Green	Paul Burgess	752	12.32	−1.32
Green	David Cox	745	12.21	+1.03
Liberal Democrats	Rebecca Jones	374	6.13	−0.23
Liberal Democrats	Judith Cohen	341	5.59	+0.38
Conservative	Lucy Hamilton	258	4.23	−0.94
Conservative	Angela Magny	220	3.61	+0.15
Conservative	Bernard Magny	193	3.16	+0.09
TUSC	Sarah O'Neill	191	3.13	N/A
Liberal Democrats	Ashley Lumsden	189	3.10	−1.35
Rejected ballots		48		
Turnout		6,102	44.06	+0.67
Registered electors		13,850		
Aspire gain from Labour		Swing		
Aspire gain from Labour		Swing		
Aspire gain from Labour		Swing		

=== Blackwall and Cubitt Town ===
Blackwall and Cubitt Town (3)
Party	Candidate	Votes	%	±%
Aspire	Abdul Malik	1,374	29.86	+11.62
Aspire	Ahmodur Khan	1,318	28.64	+13.06
Aspire	Muhammad Uddin	1,292	28.07	+11.33
Labour	Afsana Lachaux	1,129	24.53	−8.31
Labour	Christopher Worrall	1,112	24.16	−7.71
Labour	Mohammed Pappu*	1,001	21.75	−6.30
Conservative	Sofia De Sousa	869	18.88	−3.87
Conservative	Matthew Miles	777	16.88	−3.91
Conservative	Nick Vandyke	745	16.19	−4.52
Liberal Democrats	Guy Benson	673	14.62	−0.84
Green	Caroline Fenton	554	12.04	+3.77
Liberal Democrats	Richard Flowers	551	11.97	−2.51
Liberal Democrats	Azizur Khan	528	11.47	+2.12
Green	Seamus Hayes	364	7.91	+0.03
Green	Tamsin Kavanagh	359	7.80	+1.72
Rejected ballots		57		
Turnout		4,602	32.66	−1.63
Registered electors		14,091		
Aspire gain from Labour		Swing		
Aspire gain from Labour		Swing		
Aspire gain from Labour		Swing		

=== Bow East ===
Bow East (3)
Party	Candidate	Votes	%	±%
Labour Co-op	Rachel Blake*	2,800	50.48	−8.17
Labour Co-op	Amina Ali*	2,728	49.18	−3.02
Labour Co-op	Marc Francis*	2,341	42.20	−13.40
Aspire	Rahima Khatun	1,324	23.87	+13.29
Aspire	Masood Rahman	1,228	22.14	+15.03
Aspire	Monzo Khaton	1,207	21.76	+14.84
Green	Nicola Power	964	17.38	+4.95
Green	Ellis Bright	910	16.41	+6.65
Liberal Democrats	Liza Franchi	506	9.12	+1.42
Conservative	Robin Edwards	336	6.06	−1.20
Conservative	Lesley Lincoln	291	5.25	−2.28
Liberal Democrats	Simon Herbert	285	5.14	−2.24
Liberal Democrats	Richard MacMilan	282	5.08	−2.11
Conservative	Imogen Sinclair	247	4.45	−0.98
Rejected ballots		35		
Turnout		5,547	38.81	+0.68
Registered electors		14,292		
Labour hold		Swing		
Labour hold		Swing		
Labour hold		Swing		

=== Bow West ===
Bow West (2)
Party	Candidate	Votes	%	±%
Labour	Asma Begum*	1,601	38.44	−22.28
Green	Nathalie Bienfait	1,253	30.08	+19.94
Labour	Val Whitehead*	1,218	29.24	−22.67
Aspire	Ripon Ali	1,035	24.85	+17.90
Green	Alistair Polson	1,004	24.11	+11.40
Aspire	Junu Ali	944	22.67	+16.99
Liberal Democrats	Janet Ludlow	205	4.92	−5.60
Conservative	Desmond Ellerbeck	191	4.59	−4.48
Liberal Democrats	Tom Kaneko	159	3.82	−2.68
Conservative	Mariem Sarghini	157	3.77	−3.41
Rejected ballots		32		
Turnout		4,165	46.09	+2.87
Registered electors		9,036		
Labour hold		Swing		
Green gain from Labour		Swing		

=== Bromley North ===
Bromley North (2)
Party	Candidate	Votes	%	±%
Aspire	Abdul Nazrul	1,495	43.54	+15.94
Aspire	Saif Khaled	1,431	41.67	+25.66
Labour	Najnine Chowdhury	1242	36.18	−5.51
Labour	Muhammad Salam	841	24.49	−10.15
Green	Daniel Blythin-Hammond	346	10.08	+2.21
Green	Bethan Lant	281	8.18	N/A
Liberal Democrats	Nehad Chowdhury	212	6.17	+0.38
Conservative	Jonathan Gillespie	159	4.63	+0.27
Liberal Democrats	Siobhan Proudfoot	156	4.54	+1.19
Conservative	Mohammed Rahman	94	2.74	−0.83
SDP	Jonathon Mabbut	39	1.14	N/A
Rejected ballots		45		
Turnout		3,434	43.54	+1.04
Registered electors		7,887		
Aspire gain from Labour		Swing		
Aspire gain from Labour		Swing		

=== Bromley South ===
Bromley South (2)
Party	Candidate	Votes	%	±%
Labour	Shubo Hussain	1,772	44.10	−3.36
Aspire	Bodrul Choudhury	1,616	40.22	+13.17
Aspire	Ikbal Hussain	1,478	36.78	+12.78
Labour	Jenny Symmons	1,330	33.10	−13.64
Green	Barney Green	239	5.95	−0.11
Green	Rob Curry	233	5.80	+1.39
Liberal Democrats	Joshua Casswell	207	5.15	+0.07
Conservative	Stephen Charge	143	3.56	−1.49
Conservative	Indigo Atherton	139	3.46	+0.09
Liberal Democrats	David Vinas	76	1.89	−2.49
Rejected ballots		45		
Turnout		4,018	44.23	−0.23
Registered electors		9,085		
Labour hold		Swing		
Aspire gain from Labour		Swing		

=== Canary Wharf ===
Canary Wharf (2)
Party	Candidate	Votes	%	±%
Aspire	Maium Talukdar	1,164	31.66	+9.00
Aspire	Saled Ahmed	1,023	27.83	+13.07
Independent	Andrew Wood* †	993	27.01	−1.58
Labour Co-op	Adam Allnutt	885	24.08	−0.52
Labour Co-op	Shajia Sultana	846	23.01	−1.53
Conservative	Francis Germaine-Powell	492	13.38	−15.21
Conservative	Samia Hersey	408	11.10	−13.31
Liberal Democrats	Morgan Jones	363	9.87	−0.33
Liberal Democrats	Mohammed Hannan	270	7.34	+0.15
Rejected ballots		26		
Turnout		3,676	32.28	−1.61
Registered electors		11,389		
Aspire gain from Conservative		Swing		
Aspire gain from Labour		Swing		

† Andrew Wood was elected for the Conservative Party in 2018, but resigned to sit as an independent in 2020.

=== Island Gardens ===
Island Gardens (2)
Party	Candidate	Votes	%	±%
Conservative	Peter Golds*	1,092	27.66	−1.33
Labour	Mufeedah Bustin*	1,013	25.66	−1.37
Aspire	Sadiqur Rahman	971	24.59	+14.90
Aspire	Syed Ali	936	23.71	+16.32
Conservative	Callum Murphy	892	22.59	+2.21
Labour	Zaglul Khan	864	21.88	−2.80
Green	David Allison	516	13.07	+6.42
Liberal Democrats	Shelly English	489	12.39	−3.69
Liberal Democrats	Andrew Cregan	362	9.17	−14.38
Rejected ballots		39		
Turnout		3,948	40.12	−0.96
Registered electors		9,840		
Conservative hold		Swing		
Labour hold		Swing		

=== Lansbury ===
Lansbury (3)
Party	Candidate	Votes	%	±%
Aspire	Abul Ahmed	2,686	48.75	+21.19
Aspire	Iqbal Hossain	2,413	43.79	+25.91
Aspire	Jahed Choudhury	2,286	41.49	+23.60
Labour	Kahar Chowdhury*	1,803	32.72	−10.71
Labour	Shaheda Rahman	1,542	27.99	−9.92
Labour	Ansarul Haque	1,479	26.84	−10.48
Green	Norm Cassidy	546	9.91	+2.26
Liberal Democrats	Elaine Bagshaw	494	8.97	−1.34
Green	John Scanlan	464	8.42	+1.70
Conservative	Chrissie Townsend	373	6.77	−1.31
Conservative	Paul Ingham	333	6.04	−1.83
Conservative	Akbar Ali	203	3.68	−1.33
Liberal Democrats	Abdul Manik	149	2.70	−7.57
Liberal Democrats	Muhammad Uddin	134	2.43	−3.64
Rejected ballots		74		
Turnout		5,510	41.34	+0.03
Registered electors		13,330		
Aspire gain from Labour		Swing		
Aspire gain from Labour		Swing		
Aspire gain from Labour		Swing		

=== Limehouse ===
Limehouse (1)
Party	Candidate	Votes	%	±%
Labour	James King*	728	40.18	+3.13
Conservative	David Garside	403	22.24	−8.28
Aspire	Atia Jorna	347	19.15	+8.99
Liberal Democrats	Warwick Danks	191	10.54	−2.46
Green	Geoffrey Juden	143	7.89	+2.15
Majority		325		
Rejected ballots		12		
Turnout		1812	39.27	−4.84
Registered electors		4,668		
Labour hold		Swing		

=== Mile End ===
Mile End (3)
Party	Candidate	Votes	%	±%
Labour	Sabina Khan	2,530	42.59	−7.71
Labour	Leelu Ahmed	2,120	35.69	−12.12
Labour	Mohammad Chowdhury	2,119	35.67	−3.34
Aspire	Helal Miah	2,041	34.36	+16.47
Aspire	Azad Miah	1,956	32.93	+16.39
Aspire	Haji Habib	1,900	31.99	+17.60
Green	Jack Gibbons	562	9.46	+0.30
Green	Simon Levey	460	7.74	+0.50
Green	Gunther Jancke	456	7.68	N/A
Liberal Democrats	Tabitha Potts	378	6.36	+0.22
Conservative	Craig Aston	313	5.27	−2.49
Liberal Democrats	Horia Bogdan	310	5.22	−1.61
Conservative	Shah Alam	249	4.19	−1.17
Liberal Democrats	Wei Qu	240	4.04	−1.95
Conservative	Srikanth Rajgopal	173	2.91	−1.61
Rejected ballots		62		
Turnout		5,940	42.78	+1.99
Registered electors		13,885		
Labour hold		Swing		
Labour hold		Swing		
Labour hold		Swing		

=== Poplar ===
Poplar (1)
Party	Candidate	Votes	%	±%
Aspire	Gulam Choudhury	1,134	53.07	+26.25
Labour	Zenith Rahman	602	28.17	−8.67
Green	Rebecca Binns	152	7.11	N/A
Conservative	Dominic Nolan	131	6.13	−1.07
Liberal Democrats	Habibur Tafader	118	5.52	+0.69
Majority		532		
Rejected ballots		48		
Turnout		2,137	44.25	
Registered electors		4,940		
Aspire gain from Labour		Swing		

=== Shadwell ===
Shadwell (2)
Party	Candidate	Votes	%	±%
Aspire	Harun Miah	2,003	46.66	+22.32
Aspire	Ana Miah	1,486	34.61	+15.86
Liberal Democrats	Rabina Khan * †	1,451	33.80	−4.57
Labour	Abdus Shukur	872	20.31	−10.83
Labour	Victoria Obaze	852	19.85	−8.51
Liberal Democrats	Simon Tunnicliffe	403	9.39	+5.34
Green	Charlotte Nicholls	269	6.27	+1.34
Conservative	Daryl Stafford	169	3.94	+0.36
Conservative	Tara Hussain	124	2.89	−1.50
Rejected ballots		40		
Turnout		4,293	49.97	+0.08
Registered electors		8,591		
Aspire gain from PATH		Swing		
Aspire gain from Labour		Swing		

† Rabina Khan was elected for PATH in 2018, but defected to the Liberal Democrats.

=== Spitalfields and Banglatown ===
Spitalfields and Banglatown (2)
Party	Candidate	Votes	%	±%
Aspire	Kabir Hussain	1,595	42.66	+19.82
Aspire	Suluk Ahmed	1,591	42.55	+19.44
Labour	Shad Chowdhury*	1,545	41.32	−8.84
Labour	Nazma Hussain	1,128	30.17	−2.62
Green	Abdul Hye	293	7.84	+0.01
Liberal Democrats	Freda Graf	242	6.47	+0.61
Conservative	Timothy Lowe	173	4.63	−3.49
Liberal Democrats	Gareth Shelton	172	4.60	−0.99
Conservative	Shamim Miah	94	2.51	−3.82
Rejected ballots		49		
Turnout		3,739	41.40	+1.16
Registered electors		9,032		
Aspire gain from Labour		Swing		
Aspire gain from Labour		Swing		

=== St Dunstan's ===
St Dunstan's (2)
Party	Candidate	Votes	%	±%
Labour	Ayas Miah*	1,936	40.74	−10.41
Labour	Maisha Begum	1,840	38.72	−1.93
Aspire	Juned Khan	1,692	35.61	+17.42
Aspire	Nazir Ahmed	1,623	34.15	+23.42
Conservative	Adrian Thompson	422	8.88	+3.28
Liberal Democrats	Farhana Akther	300	6.31	+1.01
Conservative	Edward Brown	229	4.82	+0.34
Liberal Democrats	Mohammed Alam	220	4.63	+1.70
Green	Neil Thompson	202	4.25	−3.07
Rejected ballots		51		
Turnout		4,752	51.30	+2.02
Registered electors		9,263		
Labour hold		Swing		
Labour hold		Swing		

=== St Katharine's and Wapping ===
St Katharine's and Wapping (2)
Party	Candidate	Votes	%	±%
Labour	Abdul Ullah*	1,133	31.34	+2.56
Labour	Amy Lee	1,128	31.18	−4.46
Liberal Democrats	Dominic Buxton	961	26.56	+0.29
Liberal Democrats	Mahbub Alam	749	20.70	−2.04
Conservative	Neil King	612	16.92	−5.20
Conservative	Jane Emmerson	564	15.59	−11.05
Aspire	Abulkashem Helal	471	13.02	+9.12
Aspire	Khayrul Hasan	446	12.33	+11.38
Green	Oliver Barrs	374	10.34	+0.98
Green	Peter Simister	278	7.68	N/A
Rejected ballots				
Turnout		3,618	40.91	−1.58
Registered electors		8,843		
Labour hold		Swing		
Labour hold		Swing		

=== Stepney Green ===
Stepney Green (2)
Party	Candidate	Votes	%	±%
Aspire	Abdul Ali	1,623	39.55	+26.59
Labour	Sabina Akhtar*	1,588	38.69	−16.30
Aspire	Shuhel Malique	1,346	32.80	+24.88
Labour	Motin Uz-Zaman*	1,121	27.31	−12.27
Liberal Democrats	Akhlaqur Rahman	676	16.47	−5.37
Liberal Democrats	Kim Nottage	332	8.09	+3.81
Green	Kirsty Chestnutt	308	7.50	−0.75
Green	Thomas Mackay	202	4.92	+0.27
Conservative	Stephen Alton	198	4.82	−1.01
Conservative	Panagiotis Koutroumpis	108	2.63	−2.10
Rejected ballots		62		
Turnout		4,104	49.63	+1.84
Registered electors		8,270		
Aspire gain from Labour		Swing		
Labour hold		Swing		

=== Weavers ===
Weavers (2)
Party	Candidate	Votes	%	±%
Aspire	Kabir Ahmed	1,649	43.54	+29.37
Labour Co-op	Asma Islam	1,417	37.42	−11.18
Aspire	Fazleh Elaahi	1,224	32.32	+17.71
Labour Co-op	Kevin McKenna	1,135	29.97	−11.59
Green	Katy Guttmann	395	10.43	+1.05
Conservative	Elliot Weaver	237	6.26	+0.94
Green	Benjamin Hancocks	225	5.94	−2.72
Liberal Democrats	John Adam	203	5.36	+1.55
Liberal Democrats	Ed Long	150	3.96	−3.33
TUSC	Hugo Pierre	110	2.90	N/A
Conservative	Moulay Essaydi	106	2.80	−3.23
Rejected ballots		33		
Turnout		3,787	41.07	+0.36
Registered electors		9,221		
Aspire gain from Labour		Swing		
Labour hold		Swing		

=== Whitechapel ===
Whitechapel (3)
Party	Candidate	Votes	%	±%
Aspire	Shafi Ahmed	1,954	41.63	+11.72
Labour	Faroque Ahmed*	1,663	35.43	−7.75
Aspire	Kamrul Hussain	1,594	33.96	+7.08
Labour	Amina Ali	1,510	32.17	−0.05
Labour	Shah Ameen*	1,468	31.27	−9.13
Liberal Democrats	Aminur Khan	657	14.00	−12.88
Resurrection Young People. In Sha Allah	Shahed Ali	611	13.02	N/A
Liberal Democrats	Muhammad Abul Asad	586	12.48	−13.12
Liberal Democrats	Michael Robinson	569	12.12	+3.23
Green	Samuel Roberts	505	10.76	+0.89
Green	Shahrar Ali	352	7.50	−0.22
Conservative	Michael Dormer	273	5.82	−1.62
Conservative	Nikola Suica	204	4.35	−2.18
Conservative	Mustafa Khan	153	3.26	−2.51
Rejected ballots		42		
Turnout		4,694	39.45	+0.69
Registered electors		13,292		
Aspire gain from Labour		Swing		
Labour hold		Swing		
Aspire gain from Labour		Swing		

== Candidate winning margin ==
Eight candidates won election by fewer that 100 votes - although one of these was over a candidate from the same party.

Ward	Final winning candidate			Next candidate			Winning margin	
Ward	Party	Votes	Percentage	Party	Votes	Percentage	Votes	Percentage
Bethnal Green East	Aspire	2153	13.11	Aspire	2122	12.86	41	0.25
Bethnal Green West	Aspire	2562	15.1	Labour	2123	12.51	439	2.59
Blackwall and Cubitt Town	Aspire	1292	10.22	Labour	1129	8.93	163	1.29
Bow East	Labour	2341	15.15	Aspire	1324	8.57	1017	6.58
Bow West	Green	1253	16.13	Labour	1218	15.68	35	0.45
Bromley North	Aspire	1431	22.73	Labour	1242	19.73	189	3.00
Bromley South	Aspire	1616	22.34	Aspire	1478	20.43	138	1.91
Canary Wharf	Aspire	1023	15.88	Independent	993	15.41	30	0.47
Island Gardens	Labour	1013	14.20	Aspire	971	13.61	42	0.59
Lansbury	Aspire	2286	15.34	Labour	1803	12.10	483	3.24
Limehouse	Labour	728	40.18	Conservative	403	22.24	325	17.94
Mile End	Labour	2119	13.41	Aspire	2041	12.91	78	0.50
Poplar	Aspire	1134	53.07	Labour	602	28.17	532	24.90
Shadwell	Aspire	1486	19.48	Lib Dem	1451	19.02	35	0.46
Spitalfields and Banglatown	Aspire	1591	23.28	Labour	1545	22.61	46	0.67
St Dunstan's	Labour	1840	21.74	Aspire	1692	19.99	148	1.75
St Katherine's and Wapping	Labour	1128	16.80	Lib Dem	961	14.31	167	2.49
Stepney Green	Labour	1588	21.17	Aspire	1346	17.94	242	3.23
Weavers	Labour	1417	20.68	Aspire	1224	17.87	193	2.81
Whitechapel	Aspire	1594	13.17	Labour	1510	12.48	84	0.69

== Changes 2022-2026 ==
=== By-elections ===
==== Bow East ====
Bow East by-election: 12 September 2024
Party	Candidate	Votes	%	±%
Labour	Abdi Mohamed	1,266	53.3	▲6.1
Green	Rupert George	722	30.4	▲14.1
Conservative	Robin Edwards	239	10.1	▲4.4
Liberal Democrats	Siobhan Proudfoot	148	6.2	▼2.3
Majority		544	22.9	N/A
Turnout		2,384	15.2	–23.6
Registered electors		15,707		
Labour hold		Swing	▼4.0	
