= 2014 Tower Hamlets London Borough Council election =

2014 Tower Hamlets Council election
- 22 May 2014

All 45 seats to Tower Hamlets London Borough Council 23 seats needed for a majority

	First party	Second party	Third party
Party	Labour	Tower Hamlets First	Conservative
Last election	41 seats, 38.2%	Did not stand	7 seats, 14.2%
Seats before	41	0	7
Seats won	22	18	5
Seat change	▼19	▲18	▼2
Popular vote	69,304	62,486	20,104
Percentage	38.6%	34.9%	12.1%
Swing	▲0.4%	New	▼2.1%
- Map of the Tower Hamlets electoral wards. Conservative Labour; Tower Hamlets First. Striped wards have mixed representation
Council control before election
Labour
Council control after election
No overall control

Elections to Tower Hamlets London Borough Council took place on 22 May 2014, the same day as other United Kingdom local elections, the election of the directly elected mayor of Tower Hamlets, and the European Parliament elections. Voting in Blackwall and Cubitt Town Ward was postponed due to the death of a candidate. The Mayoral election is particularly notable for the voiding of the result due to widespread corruption.

As of 6 March 2017 the composition of the borough council was: 22 Labour, 9 Independent Group Councillors, 5 Peoples Alliance of Tower Hamlets, 5 Conservatives, 3 Independents and 1 Liberal Democrat.

== Reduction in council size ==
The Tower Hamlets (Electoral Changes) Order 2013 reduced the size of the council and created new electoral wards.

The Local Government Boundary Commission for England began the process of changing the size of Tower Hamlets Council in 2012. The new wards for the elections in 2014 are as follows.

Electoral wards in Tower Hamlets, 2014
Ward	Number of councillors
Bethnal Green	3
Blackwall and Cubitt Town	3
Bow East	3
Bow West	2
Bromley North	2
Bromley South	2
Canary Wharf	2
Island Gardens	2
Lansbury	3
Limehouse	1
Mile End	3
Poplar	1
Shadwell	2
Spitalfields and Banglatown	2
St Dunstan's	2
St Katharine's and Wapping	2
St Peter's	3
Stepney Green	2
Weavers	2
Whitechapel	3

== Results by ward ==
=== Bethnal Green ===
Bethnal Green East (3)
Party	Candidate	Votes	%	±%
Labour	Amy Gibbs	2,911	43.82	
Labour	Sirajul Islam	2,292	34.50	
Tower Hamlets First	Shafiqul Haque	2,048	30.83	
Labour	Abdirashid Gulaid	2,038	30.68	
Tower Hamlets First	Babu Chowdhury	1,792	26.98	
Tower Hamlets First	Salim Ullah	1,652	24.87	
Green	Chris Thorne	1,362	20.50	
Liberal Democrats	Kamrun Shajahan	629	9.47	
UKIP	Lubov Zsikhotska	622	9.36	
Conservative	Alan Mak	460	6.92	
Conservative	Meera Amrish Patel	330	4.97	
TUSC	Ellen Kenyon Peers	327	4.92	
TUSC	Clive Heemskerk	254	3.82	
Conservative	Taz Kha'lique	238	3.58	
Turnout		6,708	47.63	
Labour win (new seat)				
Labour win (new seat)				
Tower Hamlets First win (new seat)				

=== Blackwall & Cubitt Town ===
Blackwall & Cubitt Town (3)
Party	Candidate	Votes	%	±%
Labour	Dave Chesterton	956	33.00	
Conservative	Christopher Chapman	877	30.27	
Labour	Candida Ronald	875	30.20	
Labour	Anisur Rahman	872	30.10	
Conservative	Gloria Thienel	815	28.13	
Conservative	Geeta Kasanga	762	26.30	
Tower Hamlets First	Faruk Khan	744	25.68	
Tower Hamlets First	Kabir Ahmed	726	25.06	
Tower Hamlets First	Mohammed Aktaruzzaman	713	24.61	
UKIP	Diana Lochner	240	8.28	
UKIP	Paul Shea	190	6.56	
UKIP	Anthony Registe	188	6.49	
Green	Katy Guttmann	110	3.80	
Green	Mark Lomas	98	3.38	
Green	Chris Smith	74	2.55	
Liberal Democrats	Elaine Bagshaw	71	2.45	
Liberal Democrats	Richard Flowers	68	2.35	
Liberal Democrats	Stephen Clarke	58	2.00	
TUSC	Ellen Peers	11	0.38	
TUSC	John Peers	11	0.38	
Independent	Mohammed Rahman	11	0.38	
Turnout		2,909	31.64	
Labour win (new seat)				
Conservative win (new seat)				
Labour win (new seat)				

=== Bow East ===
Bow East (3)
Party	Candidate	Votes	%	±%
Labour	Rachel Blake	2,611	51.09	
Labour	Marc Francis	2,308	45.16	
Labour	Amina Ali	2,023	39.58	
Tower Hamlets First	Sabia Kamali	989	19.35	
Tower Hamlets First	Abdus Salam	977	19.12	
Green	Lucy Rees	935	18.29	
Tower Hamlets First	Mickey Ambrose	774	15.14	
Green	Tatyana Hancocks	651	12.74	
Conservative	Cameron Penny	520	10.17	
Conservative	James Thompson	496	9.70	
Conservative	Stephanie Chan	455	8.90	
Liberal Democrats	Andy Spracklen	449	8.78	
TUSC	George Paton	221	4.32	
Red Flag Anti-Corruption	Andy Erlam	129	2.52	
Turnout		5,156	45.86	
Labour win (new seat)				
Labour win (new seat)				
Labour win (new seat)				

=== Bow West ===
Bow West (2)
Party	Candidate	Votes	%	±%
Labour	Joshua Peck	2,439	51.84	
Labour	Asma Begum	1,996	42.42	
Tower Hamlets First	Jainal Chowdhury	702	14.98	
Conservative	Matt Smith	627	13.33	
Independent	Anwar Khan	619	13.16	
Green	Louise Whitmore	559	11.88	
Green	Alistair Polson	552	11.73	
Conservative	S M Safiul Azam	441	9.37	
Liberal Democrats	Altaf Hussain	328	6.97	
Turnout		4,737	52.33	
Labour win (new seat)				
Labour win (new seat)				

=== Bromley North ===
Bromley North (2)
Party	Candidate	Votes	%	±%
Labour	Khales Ahmed	1,534	44.81	
Tower Hamlets First	Mohammed Miah	1,247	36.43	
Labour	Zenith Rahman	1,153	33.68	
Tower Hamlets First	Moniruzzaman Syed	1,046	30.56	
Green	Christopher Devlin	281	8.21	
Green	Aaron Willson	221	6.46	
Conservative	Angela Carlton	219	6.40	
Conservative	Mark Fletcher	178	5.20	
Liberal Democrats	Victoria Flynn	136	3.97	
TUSC	Daniel McGowan	76	2.22	
Turnout		3,464	51.93	
Labour win (new seat)				
Tower Hamlets First win (new seat)				

=== Bromley South ===
Bromley South (2)
Party	Candidate	Votes	%	±%
Labour	Helal Uddin	1,565	42.74	
Labour	Danny Hassell	1,300	35.50	
Tower Hamlets First	Syeda Choudhury	1,290	35.23	
Tower Hamlets First	Kobir Ali	1,269	34.65	
Green	Ben Hancocks	343	9.37	
Conservative	Frank Thienel	270	7.37	
Liberal Democrats	Stephen Clarke	252	6.88	
Conservative	Srikanth Rajgopal	153	4.18	
Turnout		3,697	49.44	
Labour win (new seat)				
Labour win (new seat)				

=== Canary Wharf ===
Canary Wharf (2)
Party	Candidate	Votes	%	±%
Conservative	Andrew Wood	869	28.81	
Tower Hamlets First	Md. Maium Miah	829	27.49	
Labour	Debbie Simone	801	26.56	
Labour	Shubo Hussain	786	26.06	
Conservative	Ahmed Hussain	782	25.93	
Tower Hamlets First	John Cray	592	19.63	
UKIP	Mark Webber	327	10.84	
Liberal Democrats	Stephen Toal	181	6.00	
TUSC	Neil Cafferky	58	1.92	
Turnout		3,042	36.53	
Conservative win (new seat)				
Tower Hamlets First win (new seat)				

=== Island Gardens ===
Island Gardens (2)
Party	Candidate	Votes	%	±%
Conservative	Peter Golds	1,345	34.48	
Labour	Andrew Cregan	1,244	31.89	
Conservative	Gloria Thienel	1,200	30.76	
Labour	Raju Rahman	951	24.38	
Tower Hamlets First	Bellal Uddin	648	16.61	
Tower Hamlets First	Kathy McTasney	515	13.20	
UKIP	Wayne Lochner	464	11.89	
Liberal Democrats	Doug Oliver	261	6.69	
TUSC	John Peers	100	2.56	
Turnout		3,913	43.29	
Conservative win (new seat)				
Labour win (new seat)				

=== Lansbury ===
Lansbury (3)
Party	Candidate	Votes	%	±%
Labour	Rajib Ahmed	2,184	41.08	
Labour	Shiria Khatun	1,952	36.71	
Tower Hamlets First	Ohid Ahmed	1,936	36.41	
Labour	Dave Smith	1,850	34.79	
Tower Hamlets First	Shuily Akthar	1,727	32.48	
Tower Hamlets First	Stephen Beckett	1,535	28.87	
UKIP	Paul Shea	732	13.77	
Conservative	Graham Collins	387	7.28	
Conservative	Paul Ingham	332	6.24	
Liberal Democrats	Simon McGrath	232	4.36	
Conservative	Mohammed Riaz	228	4.29	
TUSC	Pete Dickenson	190	3.57	
Turnout		5,371	51.29	
Labour win (new seat)				
Labour win (new seat)				
Tower Hamlets First win (new seat)				

=== Limehouse ===
Limehouse (1)
Party	Candidate	Votes	%	±%
Conservative	Craig Aston	786	38.04	
Labour	Catherine Overton	730	35.33	
Tower Hamlets First	Mashuk Ahmed	341	16.51	
Liberal Democrats	Matt Lomas	105	5.08	
UKIP	David Hyland	104	5.03	
Turnout		2,090	48.26	
Conservative win (new seat)				

=== Mile End ===
Mile End (3)
Party	Candidate	Votes	%	±%
Tower Hamlets First	Shah Alam	2,315	39.38	
Labour	David Edgar	2,268	38.58	
Labour	Rachael Saunders	2,139	36.39	
Tower Hamlets First	Mohammed Ali	2,052	34.91	
Labour	Motin Uz-Zaman	1,801	30.64	
Tower Hamlets First	Mustak Syed	1,796	30.55	
Conservative	Naomi Snowdon	597	10.16	
Conservative	Mushtak Abdullah	571	9.71	
Liberal Democrats	Andy Hallett	500	8.51	
Conservative	Jewel Islam	446	7.59	
Independent	Hafiz Choudhury	383	6.52	
TUSC	Arzoo Miah	165	2.81	
Turnout		5,974	49.58	
Tower Hamlets First win (new seat)				
Labour win (new seat)				
Labour win (new seat)				

=== Poplar ===
Poplar (1)
Party	Candidate	Votes	%	±%
Tower Hamlets First	Gulam Choudhury	910	44.24	
Labour	Abdul Chowdhury	761	37.00	
UKIP	Anna Mignano	159	7.73	
Conservative	James Robinson	146	7.10	
Liberal Democrats	Richard Macmillan	41	1.99	
TUSC	Naomi Byron	40	1.94	
Turnout		2,090	49.64	
Tower Hamlets First win (new seat)				

=== Shadwell ===
Shadwell (2)
Party	Candidate	Votes	%	±%
Tower Hamlets First	Rabina Khan	2,199	48.88	
Tower Hamlets First	Harun Miah	2,192	48.72	
Labour	Mamun Rashid	1,462	32.50	
Labour	Farhana Zaman	892	19.83	
Green	Katy Guttmann	354	7.87	
Conservative	Des Ellerbeck	337	7.49	
Liberal Democrats	Monowara Begum	144	3.20	
TUSC	Robert Williams	141	3.13	
Turnout		4,548	55.23	
Tower Hamlets First win (new seat)				
Tower Hamlets First win (new seat)				

=== Spitalfields & Banglatown ===
Spitalfields and Banglatown (2)
Party	Candidate	Votes	%	±%
Tower Hamlets First	Gulam Robbani	1,955	48.58	
Tower Hamlets First	Suluk Ahmed	1,743	43.32	
Labour	Helal Abbas	1,215	30.19	
Labour	Tarik Khan	1,015	25.22	
Green	Zachary Thornton	485	12.05	
Conservative	Jane Emmerson	349	8.67	
Conservative	David Fell	259	6.44	
Liberal Democrats	Ferdy North	219	5.44	
TUSC	Jason Turvey	98	2.44	
Turnout		4,070	43.69	
Tower Hamlets First win (new seat)				
Tower Hamlets First win (new seat)				

=== St Dunstan's ===
St Dunstan's (2)
Party	Candidate	Votes	%	±%
Labour	Ayas Miah	1,967	41.77	
Tower Hamlets First	Mahbub Alam	1,805	38.33	
Labour	Abdal Ullah	1,386	29.43	
Tower Hamlets First	Rofique Ahmed	1,369	29.07	
Green	Chris Kilby	484	10.28	
Conservative	Charles Clarke	426	9.05	
UKIP	Martin Bryan	369	7.84	
Peace	Abdul Choudhury	254	5.39	
Conservative	Ben Mascall	254	5.39	
Liberal Democrats	Koyes Choudhury	193	4.10	
Turnout		4,780	55.78	
Labour win (new seat)				
Tower Hamlets First win (new seat)				

=== St Katharine's & Wapping ===
St Katharine's & Wapping (2)
Party	Candidate	Votes	%	±%
Conservative	Julia Dockerill	1,278	34.19	
Labour	Denise Jones	1,208	32.32	
Conservative	Neil King	1,156	30.93	
Labour	Robert Scott	956	25.58	
Tower Hamlets First	Ahad Miah	547	14.63	
Green	John Venpin	440	11.77	
Tower Hamlets First	Stuart Madewell	407	10.89	
UKIP	Grenville Mills	353	9.44	
Liberal Democrats	John Denniston	319	8.53	
Turnout		3,756	46.28	
Conservative win (new seat)				
Labour win (new seat)				

=== St Peter's ===
Bethnal Green West (3)
Party	Candidate	Votes	%	±%
Tower Hamlets First	Abjol Miah	2,289	37.35	
Labour	Clare Harrisson	2,089	34.08	
Tower Hamlets First	Muhammed Mustaquim	2,088	34.07	
Tower Hamlets First	Aktaruz Zaman	1,935	31.57	
Labour	Carlo Gibbs	1,914	31.23	
Labour	Sanu Miah	1,722	28.10	
Green	Paul Burgess	1,114	18.18	
Green	David Cox	970	15.83	
Liberal Democrats	Azizur Khan	802	13.09	
UKIP	Bertlyn Springer	453	7.39	
Conservative	Rachel Watts	342	5.58	
Conservative	Simon Fish	301	4.91	
TUSC	Leonard Rowlands	222	3.62	
Conservative	Adrian Thompson	113	1.84	
Turnout		6,183	46.90	
Tower Hamlets First win (new seat)				
Labour win (new seat)				
Tower Hamlets First win (new seat)				

=== Stepney Green ===
Stepney Green (2)
Party	Candidate	Votes	%	±%
Tower Hamlets First	Alibor Choudhury	2,023	45.80	
Tower Hamlets First	Oliur Rahman	1,965	44.49	
Labour	Sabina Akhtar	1,568	35.50	
Labour	Victoria Obaze	954	21.60	
Green	Hilary Clarke	411	9.30	
UKIP	Nicholas McQueen	387	8.76	
Conservative	Chris Wilford	209	4.73	
Conservative	Hugo Mann	166	3.76	
Liberal Democrats	Martin Donkin	151	3.42	
Turnout		4,463	54.90	
Tower Hamlets First win (new seat)				
Tower Hamlets First win (new seat)				
Void election result

=== Weavers ===
Weavers (2)
Party	Candidate	Votes	%	±%
Labour	Abdul Mukit	1,237	30.79	
Labour	John Pierce	1,223	30.45	
Tower Hamlets First	Kabir Ahmed	1,214	30.22	
Tower Hamlets First	Yousuf Khan	1,128	28.08	
Green	Chris Smith	557	13.87	
Green	Maureen Childs	527	13.12	
UKIP	Pauline McQueen	316	7.87	
Conservative	Louise Taggart	254	6.32	
Liberal Democrats	Alex Dziedzan	202	5.03	
Conservative	Luke Ounsworth	197	4.90	
TUSC	Hugo Pierre	113	2.81	
Turnout		4,048	46.22	
Labour win (new seat)				
Labour win (new seat)				

=== Whitechapel ===
Whitechapel (3)
Party	Candidate	Votes	%	±%
Tower Hamlets First	Shahed Ali	2,139	45.01	
Tower Hamlets First	Abdul Asad	2,117	44.55	
Tower Hamlets First	Aminur Khan	2,088	43.94	
Labour	Faruque Ahmed	1,359	28.60	
Labour	Robert Robinson	1,190	25.04	
Labour	Jamalur Rahman	1,188	25.00	
Green	Maggie Crosbie	703	14.79	
Conservative	Richard Holden	409	8.61	
Conservative	Dinah Glover	405	8.52	
Liberal Democrats	John Griffiths	358	7.53	
Conservative	Nicholas Vandyce	345	7.26	
UKIP	Andrew McNeilis	199	4.19	
TUSC	Michael Wrack	139	2.93	
Turnout		4,804	42.37	
Tower Hamlets First win (new seat)				
Tower Hamlets First win (new seat)				
Tower Hamlets First win (new seat)				

== 2014–2018 by-elections ==
A by-election for the ward of Stepney Green was held on 11 June 2015, after the sitting councillor, Alibor Choudhury, was found guilty of corrupt and illegal practices by an election court.

Stepney Green by-election 11 June 2015
Party	Candidate	Votes	%	±%
Labour	Sabina Akhtar	1,643	42.11	+6.61
Independent	Abu Chowdhury	1,472	37.72	N/A
Green	Kirsty Chestnutt	272	6.97	−2.33
UKIP	Paul Shea	203	5.20	−3.56
Conservative	Safiul Azam	158	4.05	−0.68
Liberal Democrats	Will Dyer	114	2.92	−0.50
Something New	Jessie Macneil-Brown	40	1.03	N/A
Majority		171	4.39	
Turnout		3,939	47.37	
Labour gain from Tower Hamlets First		Swing		

A by-election for the ward of Whitechapel was held on 2 December 2016, after the sitting councillor, Shahed Ali, was found guilty of housing fraud. Another independent candidate, Ahmed Shafi, won the seat.

Whitechapel by-election 2 December 2016
Party	Candidate	Votes	%	±%
Independent	Shafi Ahmed	1,147	44.73	N/A
Labour	Victoria Obaze	823	32.10	+1.50
Conservative	William Fletcher	217	8.46	−0.15
Liberal Democrats	Emanuel Andejelic	173	6.75	−0.78
Green	James Wilson	170	6.63	−8.16
UKIP	Paul Shea	34	1.33	−2.86
Majority		324	12.63	
Turnout		2,572	24.49	
Independent gain from Tower Hamlets First		Swing		

== Results ==
=== Mayor ===
Tower Hamlets Mayoral Election 22 May 2014 (result since declared void by an election court)
Party	Candidate	1st round		2nd round			1st round votesTransfer votes, 2nd round
Party	Candidate	Total	Of round	Transfers	Total	Of round	1st round votesTransfer votes, 2nd round
Tower Hamlets First	Lutfur Rahman	36,539	43.4%	856	37,395	52.3%	
Labour	John Biggs	27,643	32.8%	6,500	34,143	47.7%	
Conservative	Christopher Wilford	7,173	8.5%				
UKIP	Nicholas M^{c}Queen	4,819	5.7%				
Green	Chris Smith	4,699	5.7%				
Liberal Democrats	Reetendra Banerji	1,959	2.3%				
TUSC	Hugo Pierre	871	1.0%				
Independent	Reza Choudhury	205	0.2%				
Independent	Mohammed Khan	164	0.2%				
Independent	Hafiz Kadir	162	0.2%				
Turnout		86,540	47.6%	Rejected ballots: 2,306			
Registered electors		181,871					
Void election result

=== Council ===
Party	Seats won	Percentage of votes
Labour Party	22	38.6
Tower Hamlets First	18	34.9
Conservative Party	5	12.1
Total	45	
Source: Tower Hamlets Council
