= 2018 Tower Hamlets London Borough Council election =

2018 Tower Hamlets Council election
- 3 May 2018

All 45 seats to Tower Hamlets London Borough Council 23 seats needed for a majority

| | First party | Second party | Third party |
|---|---|---|---|
| Party | Labour | Conservative | PATH |
| Last election | 22 seats, 38.6% | 5 seats, 12.1% | Did not stand |
| Seats before | 22 | 5 | 6 |
| Seats won | 42 | 2 | 1 |
| Seat change | ▲20 | ▼3 | ▼5 |
| Popular vote | 79,551 | 17,107 | 19,580 |
| Percentage | 46.1% | 9.9% | 11.3% |
| Swing | ▲7.5% | ▼2.2% | New |
| | Fourth party | Fifth party | Sixth party |
| Party | Aspire | Liberal Democrats | Green |
| Last election | Did not stand | 0 seats, 6.0% | 0 seats, 8.8% |
| Seats before | 10 | 1 | 0 |
| Seats won | 0 | 0 | 0 |
| Seat change | ▼10 | ▼1 | Steady |
| Popular vote | 26,513 | 14,897 | 13,661 |
| Percentage | 15.4% | 8.6% | 7.9% |
| Swing | New | ▲2.6% | ▼0.9% |
- Map of the Tower Hamlets electoral wards. Conservative Labour; People's Alliance of Tower Hamlets (PATH). Striped wards have mixed representation
Council control before election
No overall control
Council control after election
Labour

Elections to Tower Hamlets London Borough Council were held on 3 May 2018, the same day as other borough council elections in London. The directly elected mayor of Tower Hamlets was also up for election.

== Prior council composition ==
Since the 2014 election the makeup of the borough council has changed considerably, with the second-placed Tower Hamlets First party removed from the Electoral Commission's register of political parties following election court findings that Tower Hamlets First did not operate any responsible financial scheme, nor in the manners as submitted in its registration as a political party, Lutfur Rahman's re-election to the post of mayor was declared void, and the subsequent by-election was won by John Biggs of the Labour Party. The Labour Party controlled the council from the time of the by-election in June 2015 until one of its councillors defected to the Liberal Democrats in February 2017 over Brexit. Another of Labour's councillors, who served as the Speaker of the Council, was suspended by the party for 10 months in 2016, and again in March 2018, ending his term as an independent; he went into the election as a candidate for People's Alliance of Tower Hamlets. Also represented was the Conservative Party.

The 2018 result saw Labour hold the mayoralty and re-gain control of the council, winning all but one of the seats won by Tower Hamlets First in 2014, as well as seats from the Conservatives. Rabina Khan, formerly of Tower Hamlets First, but now leader of the rival PATH, came second in the Mayoral election and was the only former Tower Hamlets First councillor to win a seat.

== Electoral wards ==
The election was held on the boundaries established by the Tower Hamlets (Electoral Changes) Order 2013, which reduced the size of the council and created new electoral wards. This was the second election on the new boundaries, after the 2014 election.

== Overall results ==
Tower Hamlets local election result 2018
| Party | Seats | Gains | Losses | Net gain/loss | Seats % | Votes % | Votes | +/− |
|---|---|---|---|---|---|---|---|---|
| Labour | 42 | 20 | 1 | +19 | 93.3 | 46.1 | 79,551 | +7.5 |
| Aspire | 0 | 0 | 10 | -10 | 0.0 | 15.4 | 26,513 | New |
| PATH | 1 | 1 | 0 | +1 | 2.2 | 11.3 | 19,580 | New |
| Conservative | 2 | 0 | 3 | -3 | 4.4 | 9.9 | 17,107 | -2.2 |
| Liberal Democrats | 0 | 0 | 0 | 0 | | 8.6 | 14,897 | +5.4 |
| Green | 0 | 0 | 0 | 0 | | 7.9 | 13,661 | +1.6 |
| Independent | 0 | 0 | 0 | 0 | | 0.3 | 590 | -0.3 |
| Women's Equality | 0 | 0 | 0 | 0 | | 0.3 | 564 | New |
| Renew | 0 | 0 | 0 | 0 | | 0.1 | 154 | New |
| Tower Hamlets First | 0 | 0 | -18 | -18 | | 0 | 0 | New |

== Results by ward ==
=== Bethnal Green ===
Bethnal Green (3)
| Party | Candidate | Votes | % | ±% |
|---|---|---|---|---|
| Labour | Mohammed Hossain | 2,916 | 51.57 | +7.75 |
| Labour | Sirajul Islam* | 2,830 | 50.05 | +15.55 |
| Labour | Eve McQuillan | 2,816 | 49.81 | +19.13 |
| PATH | Syed Haque | 800 | 14.15 | N/A |
| PATH | Shamsul Hoque | 778 | 13.76 | N/A |
| Green | Eleanor Matthews | 678 | 11.99 | −8.51 |
| Green | Paul Burgess | 570 | 10.08 | N/A |
| Women's Equality | Jessie MacNeil-Brown | 564 | 9.98 | N/A |
| Green | John Foster | 532 | 9.41 | N/A |
| Aspire | Farhana Akther | 501 | 8.86 | N/A |
| Aspire | Md Amadul Chowdhury | 394 | 6.97 | N/A |
| Liberal Democrats | Will Dyer | 375 | 6.63 | −2.84 |
| Aspire | Jamir Hussain | 357 | 6.31 | N/A |
| Liberal Democrats | Silas Davis | 347 | 6.14 | N/A |
| Liberal Democrats | Phyllisa Shelton | 323 | 5.71 | N/A |
| Conservative | Radia Alam | 291 | 5.15 | −1.77 |
| Conservative | Lillian Ingram | 291 | 5.15 | +0.18 |
| Conservative | Dinah Glover | 291 | 5.15 | +1.57 |
| Rejected ballots | | 82 | | |
| Turnout | | 5,736 | 41.91 | |
| Registered electors | | 13,688 | | |
| Labour hold | | Swing | | |
| Labour hold | | Swing | | |
| Labour gain from Tower Hamlets First | | Swing | | |

=== Blackwall and Cubitt Town ===
In October 2018, Pappu was suspended from the Labour group on the council on following a tirade of antisemitic posts on his social media. He subsequently apologised and was readmitted to the Labour Party.

Blackwall and Cubitt Town (3)
| Party | Candidate | Votes | % | ±% |
|---|---|---|---|---|
| Labour | Candida Ronald* | 1,275 | 32.84 | +2.64 |
| Labour | Ehtasham Haque | 1,237 | 31.87 | −1.13 |
| Labour | Mohammed Pappu | 1,089 | 28.05 | −2.05 |
| Conservative | Alexander Kay | 883 | 22.75 | −7.52 |
| Conservative | Sofia Sousa | 807 | 20.79 | −7.34 |
| Conservative | Nick Vandyke | 804 | 20.71 | −5.59 |
| Aspire | Abdul Malik | 708 | 18.24 | N/A |
| Aspire | Muhammad Uddin | 650 | 16.74 | N/A |
| Aspire | Mohammed Rahman | 605 | 15.58 | N/A |
| Liberal Democrats | Stephen Clarke | 600 | 15.46 | +13.01 |
| Liberal Democrats | Gabriella de Ferry | 562 | 14.48 | +12.13 |
| Liberal Democrats | Antonio Munoz Moreno | 363 | 9.35 | +7.35 |
| Green | Thomas Fea | 321 | 8.27 | +4.47 |
| Green | Mark Lomas | 306 | 7.88 | +4.50 |
| PATH | Shahena Nessa | 287 | 7.39 | N/A |
| Green | David Hoole | 236 | 6.08 | +3.53 |
| Rejected ballots | | 35 | | |
| Turnout | | 3,917 | 34.29 | |
| Registered electors | | 11,422 | | |
| Labour hold | | Swing | | |
| Labour gain from Conservative | | Swing | | |
| Labour hold | | Swing | | |

=== Bow East ===
Bow East (3)
| Party | Candidate | Votes | % | ±% |
|---|---|---|---|---|
| Labour | Rachel Blake* | 2,789 | 58.65 | +7.56 |
| Labour | Marc Francis* | 2,644 | 55.60 | +10.44 |
| Labour | Amina Ali* | 2,482 | 52.20 | +12.62 |
| Green | David Cox | 591 | 12.43 | −5.86 |
| Aspire | Foyzul Islam | 503 | 10.58 | N/A |
| Green | Farika Holden | 464 | 9.76 | −2.98 |
| Green | Daniel Smith | 416 | 8.75 | N/A |
| PATH | Shah Bodruzzaman | 390 | 8.20 | N/A |
| Liberal Democrats | Eimear O'Casey | 366 | 7.70 | −1.08 |
| Conservative | Sean Dempster | 358 | 7.53 | −2.64 |
| Liberal Democrats | Ben Sims | 346 | 7.28 | N/A |
| Conservative | Robin Edwards | 345 | 7.26 | −2.44 |
| Liberal Democrats | Koyes Choudhury | 342 | 7.19 | N/A |
| Aspire | Mohammed Rahman | 338 | 7.11 | N/A |
| Aspire | Mahamed Ismail | 329 | 6.92 | N/A |
| Conservative | Joseph Mycroft | 258 | 5.43 | −3.47 |
| Rejected ballots | | 26 | | |
| Turnout | | 4,781 | 38.13 | |
| Registered electors | | 12,961 | | |
| Labour hold | | Swing | | |
| Labour hold | | Swing | | |
| Labour hold | | Swing | | |

=== Bow West ===
Bow West (2)
| Party | Candidate | Votes | % | ±% |
|---|---|---|---|---|
| Labour | Asma Begum* | 2,384 | 60.72 | +18.30 |
| Labour | Val Whitehead | 2,038 | 51.91 | +0.07 |
| Green | Alistair Polson | 499 | 12.71 | +0.98 |
| Liberal Democrats | Liza Franchi | 413 | 10.52 | N/A |
| Green | Anne Silberbauer | 398 | 10.14 | −1.74 |
| Conservative | Samuel Hall | 356 | 9.07 | −4.26 |
| Conservative | Agnieszka Kendrick | 282 | 7.18 | −2.19 |
| Aspire | Habibur Rahman | 273 | 6.95 | N/A |
| Liberal Democrats | Altaf Hussain | 255 | 6.50 | −0.47 |
| Aspire | Mohammed Tanim | 223 | 5.68 | N/A |
| Rejected ballots | | 27 | | |
| Turnout | | 3,953 | 43.22 | |
| Registered electors | | 9,146 | | |
| Labour hold | | Swing | | |
| Labour hold | | Swing | | |

=== Bromley North ===
Bromley North (2)
| Party | Candidate | Votes | % | ±% |
|---|---|---|---|---|
| Labour | Zenith Rahman | 1,367 | 41.69 | +8.01 |
| Labour | Dan Tomlinson | 1,136 | 34.64 | −10.17 |
| Aspire | Mohammed Miah* | 905 | 27.60 | −8.83 |
| PATH | Khales Ahmed* | 795 | 24.25 | −20.56 |
| Aspire | Nazrul Mannan | 525 | 16.01 | N/A |
| PATH | Nehad Chowdhury | 353 | 10.77 | N/A |
| Green | Helen Bateman | 258 | 7.87 | −0.34 |
| Liberal Democrats | Janet Ludlow | 190 | 5.79 | +1.82 |
| Conservative | Angela Carlton | 143 | 4.36 | −2.04 |
| Conservative | Scott Gibson | 117 | 3.57 | −1.63 |
| Liberal Democrats | Christopher Rawlins | 110 | 3.35 | N/A |
| Rejected ballots | | 47 | | |
| Turnout | | 3,326 | | |
| Registered electors | | 7,461 | | |
| Labour hold | | Swing | | |
| Labour gain from Tower Hamlets First | | Swing | | |

=== Bromley South ===
Bromley South (2)
| Party | Candidate | Votes | % | ±% |
|---|---|---|---|---|
| Labour | Danny Hassell* | 1,786 | 47.46 | +11.96 |
| Labour | Helal Uddin* | 1,759 | 46.74 | +4.00 |
| Aspire | Bodrul Choudhury | 1,018 | 27.05 | N/A |
| Aspire | Kabir Hussain | 903 | 24.00 | N/A |
| PATH | Ras Uddin | 271 | 7.20 | N/A |
| Green | Caroline Fenton | 228 | 6.06 | −3.31 |
| Liberal Democrats | Josh Casswell | 191 | 5.08 | −1.80 |
| Conservative | Ben Crompton | 190 | 5.05 | −2.32 |
| Green | Florian Herzberg | 166 | 4.41 | N/A |
| Liberal Democrats | Emily Stevenson | 165 | 4.38 | N/A |
| Conservative | Zachary Harris | 127 | 3.37 | −0.81 |
| Rejected ballots | | 47 | | |
| Turnout | | 3,326 | | |
| Registered electors | | 7,461 | | |
| Labour hold | | Swing | | |
| Labour hold | | Swing | | |

=== Canary Wharf ===
In February 2020, Wood resigned as Leader of the Opposition and as a Conservative in opposition to Brexit and the Housing Secretary, Robert Jenrick's decision to approve the building of the Westferry Printworks skyscrapers. He now sits as an independent.

Canary Wharf (2)
| Party | Candidate | Votes | % | ±% |
|---|---|---|---|---|
| Conservative | Andrew Wood* | 883 | 28.59 | −0.22 |
| Labour | Kyrsten Perry | 760 | 24.60 | −1.96 |
| Labour | Anisur Anis | 758 | 24.54 | −1.52 |
| Conservative | Tom Randall | 754 | 24.41 | −1.52 |
| Aspire | Mohammed Maium Miah Talukdar* | 700 | 22.66 | −4.83 |
| Aspire | Helen Begum | 456 | 14.76 | N/A |
| Liberal Democrats | Kevin Lyons | 315 | 10.20 | +4.20 |
| PATH | Yusuf Ahmed | 236 | 7.64 | N/A |
| Liberal Democrats | Gareth Shelton | 222 | 7.19 | N/A |
| Green | Andrew Grey | 215 | 6.96 | N/A |
| Independent | Natasha Bolter | 141 | 4.56 | N/A |
| Green | Alasdair Blackwell | 137 | 4.44 | N/A |
| Rejected ballots | | 12 | | |
| Turnout | | 3,101 | 33.89 | |
| Registered electors | | 9,150 | | |
| Conservative hold | | Swing | | |
| Labour gain from Tower Hamlets First | | Swing | | |

=== Island Gardens ===
Island Gardens (2)
| Party | Candidate | Votes | % | ±% |
|---|---|---|---|---|
| Labour | Mufeedah Bustin | 1,111 | 29.10 | −2.79 |
| Conservative | Peter Golds* | 1,107 | 28.99 | −5.49 |
| Labour | Shubo Hussain | 1,032 | 27.03 | +2.65 |
| Liberal Democrats | Elaine Bagshaw | 899 | 23.55 | +16.86 |
| Conservative | James Strawson | 778 | 20.38 | −10.38 |
| Liberal Democrats | Shelly English | 614 | 16.08 | N/A |
| Aspire | Sadiqur Bablu Rahman | 370 | 9.69 | N/A |
| Aspire | Sohid Chowdhury | 282 | 7.39 | N/A |
| Green | Victoria Gladwin | 279 | 7.31 | N/A |
| Green | David Allison | 254 | 6.65 | N/A |
| PATH | Abdul Manik | 197 | 5.16 | N/A |
| Rejected ballots | | 35 | | |
| Turnout | | 3853 | 41.08 | |
| Registered electors | | 9,380 | | |
| Labour hold | | Swing | | |
| Conservative hold | | Swing | | |

=== Lansbury ===
Lansbury (3)
| Party | Candidate | Votes | % | ±% |
|---|---|---|---|---|
| Labour | Kahar Chowdhury | 2,140 | 43.43 | +2.35 |
| Labour | Muhammad Harun | 1,868 | 37.91 | +1.20 |
| Labour | Bex White | 1,839 | 37.32 | +2.53 |
| Aspire | Ohid Ahmed* | 1,358 | 27.56 | −8.85 |
| Aspire | Jahed Choudhury | 980 | 19.89 | N/A |
| Aspire | Shully Akthar | 881 | 17.88 | −14.60 |
| PATH | Abdul Sheikh | 646 | 13.11 | N/A |
| Liberal Democrats | Jack Gilbert | 506 | 10.27 | +5.91 |
| Liberal Democrats | Oliver McQueen | 506 | 10.27 | N/A |
| Conservative | Mumshad Afruz | 398 | 8.08 | +0.80 |
| Conservative | Paul Ingham | 388 | 7.87 | +1.63 |
| Green | Katy Guttmann | 377 | 7.65 | N/A |
| PATH | Syed Miah | 354 | 7.18 | N/A |
| PATH | Muhammad Uddin | 337 | 6.84 | N/A |
| Green | John Urpeth | 331 | 6.72 | N/A |
| Liberal Democrats | Tara Hussain | 299 | 6.07 | N/A |
| Conservative | Hanad Darwish | 247 | 5.01 | +0.72 |
| Independent | Monsur Khan | 167 | 3.39 | N/A |
| Rejected ballots | | 56 | | |
| Turnout | | 4,983 | 41.31 | |
| Registered electors | | 12,063 | | |
| Labour hold | | Swing | | |
| Labour hold | | Swing | | |
| Labour gain from Tower Hamlets First | | Swing | | |

=== Limehouse ===
Limehouse (1)
| Party | Candidate | Votes | % | ±% |
|---|---|---|---|---|
| Labour | James King | 755 | 37.05 | +1.72 |
| Conservative | David Garside | 622 | 30.52 | −7.52 |
| Liberal Democrats | Jack Briggs | 265 | 13.00 | +7.92 |
| Aspire | Shaheen Rashid | 207 | 10.16 | N/A |
| Green | Tim Kiely | 117 | 5.74 | N/A |
| PATH | Adam O'Connell | 72 | 3.53 | N/A |
| Majority | | 133 | | |
| Rejected ballots | | 28 | | |
| Turnout | | 2,066 | 44.11 | |
| Registered electors | | 4,684 | | |
| Labour gain from Conservative | | Swing | | |

=== Mile End ===
Mile End (3)
| Party | Candidate | Votes | % | ±% |
|---|---|---|---|---|
| Labour | Asma Islam | 2,646 | 50.30 | +13.91 |
| Labour | David Edgar* | 2,515 | 47.81 | +9.23 |
| Labour | Puru Miah | 2,052 | 39.01 | +8.37 |
| PATH | Shah Alam* | 1,142 | 21.71 | −17.67 |
| Aspire | Helal Miah | 941 | 17.89 | N/A |
| Aspire | Joynul Bashar | 870 | 16.54 | N/A |
| Aspire | Mustak Syed | 757 | 14.39 | −16.16 |
| PATH | Mohammad Obeaidur Rahman | 539 | 10.25 | N/A |
| Green | Ciaran Cusack | 482 | 9.16 | N/A |
| Conservative | Gracie Browning | 408 | 7.76 | −2.40 |
| Green | Aaron Parr | 381 | 7.24 | N/A |
| Liberal Democrats | Jonathan Fryer | 359 | 6.83 | −1.68 |
| Liberal Democrats | Tabitha Potts | 323 | 6.14 | N/A |
| Liberal Democrats | Richard MacMillan | 315 | 5.99 | N/A |
| Conservative | Nick Millward | 282 | 5.36 | −4.35 |
| Conservative | Carlos Soares de Freitas | 238 | 4.52 | −3.07 |
| PATH | Mohammad Sajjadur Rahman | 178 | 3.38 | N/A |
| Rejected ballots | | 57 | | |
| Turnout | | 5,317 | 40.79 | |
| Registered electors | | 13,036 | | |
| Labour gain from Tower Hamlets First | | Swing | | |
| Labour hold | | Swing | | |
| Labour hold | | Swing | | |

=== Poplar ===
Poplar (1)
| Party | Candidate | Votes | % | ±% |
|---|---|---|---|---|
| Labour | Sufia Alam | 732 | 36.84 | −0.16 |
| Aspire | Gulum Choudhury* | 533 | 26.82 | −17.42 |
| PATH | Dulal Uddin | 445 | 22.40 | N/A |
| Conservative | Harry Scoffin | 143 | 7.20 | +0.10 |
| Liberal Democrats | John Denniston | 96 | 4.83 | +2.84 |
| Independent | Luke Connolly | 38 | 1.91 | N/A |
| Majority | | 199 | | |
| Rejected ballots | | 57 | | |
| Turnout | | 2,044 | 45.86 | |
| Registered electors | | 4,457 | | |
| Labour gain from Tower Hamlets First | | Swing | | |

=== Shadwell ===
In October 2018, Khan joined the Liberal Democrats after the People's Alliance of Tower Hamlets folded.

Shadwell (2)
| Party | Candidate | Votes | % | ±% |
|---|---|---|---|---|
| PATH | Rabina Khan* | 1,565 | 38.37 | −10.51 |
| Labour | Ruhul Amin | 1,270 | 31.14 | −1.36 |
| Labour | Charlotte Norton | 1,157 | 28.36 | +8.53 |
| Aspire | Mohammad Harun Miah* | 993 | 24.34 | −24.38 |
| PATH | Ana Miah | 765 | 18.75 | N/A |
| Aspire | Bodruzzaman Shamim | 439 | 10.76 | N/A |
| Independent | Kazi Gous-Miah | 244 | 5.98 | N/A |
| Green | Ben Hyde-Hart | 201 | 4.93 | −2.94 |
| Conservative | Des Ellerbeck | 179 | 4.39 | −3.10 |
| Liberal Democrats | Dominic Buxton | 165 | 4.05 | +0.85 |
| Conservative | Daryl Stafford | 146 | 3.58 | N/A |
| Liberal Democrats | Freda Graf | 143 | 3.51 | N/A |
| Green | Jonathan Page | 121 | 2.97 | N/A |
| Rejected ballots | | 73 | | |
| Turnout | | 4,152 | 49.89 | |
| Registered electors | | 8,323 | | |
| PATH gain from Tower Hamlets First | | Swing | | |
| Labour gain from Tower Hamlets First | | Swing | | |

=== Spitalfields and Banglatown ===
Spitalfields and Banglatown (2)
| Party | Candidate | Votes | % | ±% |
|---|---|---|---|---|
| Labour | Shad Chowdury | 1,704 | 50.16 | +19.97 |
| Labour | Leema Qureshi | 1,114 | 32.79 | +7.57 |
| Aspire | Suluk Ahmed* | 785 | 23.11 | −20.21 |
| Aspire | Kalam Choudhury | 776 | 22.84 | N/A |
| Conservative | Anwara Ali | 276 | 8.12 | −0.55 |
| Green | Maureen Childs | 266 | 7.83 | −4.22 |
| PATH | Abdul Rob | 263 | 7.74 | N/A |
| Conservative | William Fletcher | 215 | 6.33 | −0.11 |
| Green | Oli Walker | 201 | 5.92 | N/A |
| Liberal Democrats | Linda Packard | 199 | 5.86 | N/A |
| Liberal Democrats | Ferdy North | 190 | 5.59 | +0.15 |
| PATH | Sumsul Talukder | 145 | 4.27 | N/A |
| Rejected ballots | | 49 | | |
| Turnout | | 3,446 | 40.24 | |
| Registered electors | | 8,563 | | |
| Labour gain from Tower Hamlets First | | Swing | | |
| Labour gain from Tower Hamlets First | | Swing | | |

=== St Dunstan's ===
St Dunstan's (2)
| Party | Candidate | Votes | % | ±% |
|---|---|---|---|---|
| Labour | Ayas Miah* | 2,202 | 51.15 | +9.38 |
| Labour | Dipa Das | 1,750 | 40.65 | +11.22 |
| PATH | Muhammad Hussain | 902 | 20.95 | N/A |
| Aspire | Mahbub Alam* | 783 | 18.19 | −20.14 |
| Aspire | Momina Begum | 462 | 10.73 | N/A |
| PATH | Shahar Imran | 449 | 10.43 | N/A |
| Green | Catherine Conway | 315 | 7.32 | −2.96 |
| Conservative | Lawrence Kay | 241 | 5.60 | −3.45 |
| Green | Ben Hancocks | 237 | 5.51 | N/A |
| Liberal Democrats | Helen Harris | 228 | 5.30 | +1.20 |
| Conservative | Dan Lambeth | 193 | 4.48 | −0.91 |
| Liberal Democrats | Frank Muldoon | 126 | 2.93 | N/A |
| Rejected ballots | | 48 | | |
| Turnout | | 4,353 | 49.28 | |
| Registered electors | | 8,833 | | |
| Labour hold | | Swing | | |
| Labour gain from Tower Hamlets First | | Swing | | |

=== St Katharine's and Wapping ===
St Katharine's and Wapping (2)
| Party | Candidate | Votes | % | ±% |
|---|---|---|---|---|
| Labour | Denise Jones* | 1,279 | 35.64 | +3.32 |
| Labour | Abdul Ullah | 1,033 | 28.78 | +3.20 |
| Conservative | Kirsty Finlayson | 956 | 26.64 | −7.55 |
| Liberal Democrats | Marie Cahill | 943 | 26.27 | +17.74 |
| Liberal Democrats | Stephen O'Shea | 816 | 22.74 | N/A |
| Conservative | Neil King | 794 | 22.12 | −8.81 |
| Green | Robert Crowston | 336 | 9.36 | −2.41 |
| PATH | Masuma Begum | 174 | 4.85 | N/A |
| Aspire | Mohammad Mamun | 140 | 3.90 | N/A |
| Aspire | Altab Miah | 34 | 0.95 | N/A |
| Rejected ballots | | 24 | | |
| Turnout | | 3,613 | 42.49 | |
| Registered electors | | 8,503 | | |
| Labour gain from Conservative | | Swing | | |
| Labour hold | | Swing | | |

=== St Peter's ===
St Peter's (3)
| Party | Candidate | Votes | % | ±% |
|---|---|---|---|---|
| Labour | Kevin Brady | 2,660 | 46.46 | +12.38 |
| Labour | Tarik Khan | 2,483 | 43.37 | +12.14 |
| Labour | Gabriela Salva Macallan | 2,375 | 41.48 | +13.38 |
| Aspire | Muhammad Mustaquim* | 1,034 | 18.06 | −16.01 |
| Aspire | Abu Chowdhury | 954 | 16.66 | N/A |
| Aspire | Muhammed Alipir | 822 | 14.36 | N/A |
| PATH | Akram Ahmed | 781 | 13.64 | N/A |
| Green | Alexandra Britten | 781 | 13.64 | −4.84 |
| PATH | Azizur Khan | 726 | 12.68 | −0.41 |
| PATH | Abjol Miah* | 705 | 12.31 | −25.04 |
| Green | Ciaran Jebb | 640 | 11.18 | −4.65 |
| Green | Bethan Lant | 437 | 7.63 | N/A |
| Liberal Democrats | John Griffiths | 364 | 6.36 | −6.73 |
| Liberal Democrats | Tilly Munro | 298 | 5.21 | N/A |
| Conservative | Susan Field | 296 | 5.17 | −0.41 |
| Liberal Democrats | Arif Erdogan | 255 | 4.45 | N/A |
| Conservative | Gregory Rodwell | 198 | 3.46 | −1.45 |
| Conservative | Zachary Spiro | 176 | 3.07 | +1.23 |
| Rejected ballots | | 42 | | |
| Turnout | | 5,767 | 43.39 | |
| Registered electors | | 13,292 | | |
| Labour gain from Tower Hamlets First | | Swing | | |
| Labour hold | | Swing | | |
| Labour gain from Tower Hamlets First | | Swing | | |

=== Stepney Green ===
Stepney Green (2)
| Party | Candidate | Votes | % | ±% |
|---|---|---|---|---|
| Labour | Sabina Akhtar* | 2,105 | 54.99 | +19.99 |
| Labour | Motin Uz-Zaman | 1,515 | 39.58 | +17.98 |
| PATH | Akhlaqur Rahman | 836 | 21.84 | N/A |
| PATH | Ahbab Miah | 620 | 16.20 | N/A |
| Aspire | Oliur Rahman* | 496 | 12.96 | −31.53 |
| Green | Kirsty Chestnutt | 316 | 8.25 | −1.05 |
| Aspire | Habibur Rahman | 303 | 7.92 | N/A |
| Conservative | David Fell | 223 | 5.83 | +1.10 |
| Conservative | Tiffany Trenner-Lyle | 181 | 4.73 | +0.97 |
| Green | George Lyle | 178 | 4.65 | N/A |
| Liberal Democrats | Ailbhe Rees | 164 | 4.28 | +0.86 |
| Liberal Democrats | Antony Sanders | 148 | 3.87 | N/A |
| Rejected ballots | | 57 | | |
| Turnout | | 3,885 | 47.79 | |
| Registered electors | | 8,130 | | |
| Labour gain from Tower Hamlets First | | Swing | | |
| Labour gain from Tower Hamlets First | | Swing | | |

=== Weavers ===
Weavers (2)
| Party | Candidate | Votes | % | ±% |
|---|---|---|---|---|
| Labour | Abdul Mukit* | 1,773 | 48.60 | +17.81 |
| Labour | John Pierce* | 1,516 | 41.56 | +11.11 |
| Aspire | Mohammed Elaahi | 533 | 14.61 | N/A |
| Aspire | Mohammed Hussain | 517 | 14.17 | N/A |
| Green | Andrew Fernandez | 342 | 9.38 | −4.49 |
| Green | Chris Smith | 316 | 8.66 | −4.46 |
| Liberal Democrats | Ed Long | 266 | 7.29 | +2.26 |
| PATH | Halima Shopna | 231 | 6.33 | N/A |
| Conservative | Philip Baldwin | 220 | 6.03 | −0.29 |
| Conservative | Elliott Weaver | 194 | 5.32 | +0.42 |
| Renew | Spencer Wood | 154 | 4.22 | N/A |
| PATH | Taj Uddin | 141 | 3.87 | N/A |
| Liberal Democrats | Ify Okoli | 139 | 3.81 | N/A |
| Rejected ballots | | 41 | | |
| Turnout | | 3,689 | 40.71 | |
| Registered electors | | 9,062 | | |
| Labour hold | | Swing | | |
| Labour hold | | Swing | | |

=== Whitechapel ===
Whitechapel (3)
| Party | Candidate | Votes | % | ±% |
|---|---|---|---|---|
| Labour | Faroque Ahmed | 1,812 | 43.18 | +14.58 |
| Labour | Shah Ameen | 1,695 | 40.40 | +15.36 |
| Labour | Victoria Obaze | 1,352 | 32.22 | +7.22 |
| PATH | Shafi Ahmed* | 1,255 | 29.91 | −15.10 |
| PATH | Aminur Khan* | 1,128 | 26.88 | −17.06 |
| PATH | Muhammad Asad | 1,074 | 25.60 | −18.95 |
| Green | Katy Clarke | 414 | 9.87 | −4.92 |
| Liberal Democrats | Nicola East | 373 | 8.89 | +1.36 |
| Aspire | Syed Ali | 341 | 8.13 | N/A |
| Green | Miles Battye | 324 | 7.72 | N/A |
| Conservative | Jane Emmerson | 312 | 7.44 | −1.17 |
| Aspire | Syeda Eshrat Queen | 281 | 6.70 | N/A |
| Conservative | Mark Fletcher | 274 | 6.53 | −1.99 |
| Liberal Democrats | Emanuel Andjelic | 255 | 6.08 | N/A |
| Aspire | Dipu Jaigirdar | 253 | 6.03 | N/A |
| Conservative | Noel Dube | 242 | 5.77 | −1.49 |
| Liberal Democrats | Stilpon Nestor | 237 | 5.65 | N/A |
| Rejected ballots | | 49 | | |
| Turnout | | 4,245 | 38.76 | |
| Registered electors | | 10,953 | | |
| Labour gain from Tower Hamlets First | | Swing | | |
| Labour gain from Tower Hamlets First | | Swing | | |
| Labour gain from Tower Hamlets First | | Swing | | |

== By elections 2018–2022 ==
Lansbury Ward by election – 7th February 2019
| Party | Candidate | Votes | % | ±% |
|---|---|---|---|---|
| Labour | Rajib Ahmed | 1,308 | 40.80 | +2.89 |
| Aspire | Ohid Ahmed | 1,002 | 31.25 | +3.69 |
| Liberal Democrats | Muhammad Asad | 290 | 9.05 | −1.22 |
| UKIP | Paul Shea | 176 | 5.49 | N/A |
| Conservative | Mumshad Afruz | 175 | 5.46 | −2.62 |
| Green | John Urpeth | 166 | 5.18 | −1.54 |
| The House Party | Terence McGrenera | 89 | 2.78 | N/A |
| Majority | | 306 | 9.55 | |
| Turnout | | 3,239 | 26.51 | |
| Labour hold | | Swing | | |

Shadwell Ward by election – 7th February 2019
| Party | Candidate | Votes | % | ±% |
|---|---|---|---|---|
| Aspire | Harun Miah | 1,012 | 34.85 | +10.51 |
| Labour | Asik Rahman | 914 | 31.47 | +0.33 |
| Liberal Democrats | Abjol Miah | 484 | 16.67 | +12.62 |
| Conservative | Daryl Stafford | 185 | 6.37 | +2.79 |
| Green | Tim Kelly | 125 | 4.30 | −0.63 |
| Independent | Kazi Miah | 119 | 4.10 | −1.88 |
| Women's Equality | Elena Scherbatykh | 65 | 2.24 | N/A |
| Majority | | 98 | 3.38 | |
| Turnout | | 2,934 | 35.39 | |
| Aspire gain from Labour | | Swing | | |

Weavers Ward by election –12th August 2021
| Party | Candidate | Votes | % | ±% |
|---|---|---|---|---|
| Aspire | Kabir Ahmed | 1,204 | 46.47 | +31.86 |
| Labour | Nasrin Khan | 742 | 28.64 | −12.92 |
| Conservative | Elliott Weaver | 360 | 13.89 | +8.57 |
| Green | Nathalie Bienfait | 205 | 7.91 | −1.47 |
| Liberal Democrats | Emannuel Andjelic | 50 | 1.93 | −5.36 |
| TUSC | Hugo Piere | 30 | 1.16 | N/A |
| Majority | | 462 | 17.83 | |
| Turnout | | 2,606 | | |
| Aspire gain from Labour | | Swing | | |
