= Aspire (political party) =

Political party in the London Borough of Tower Hamlets

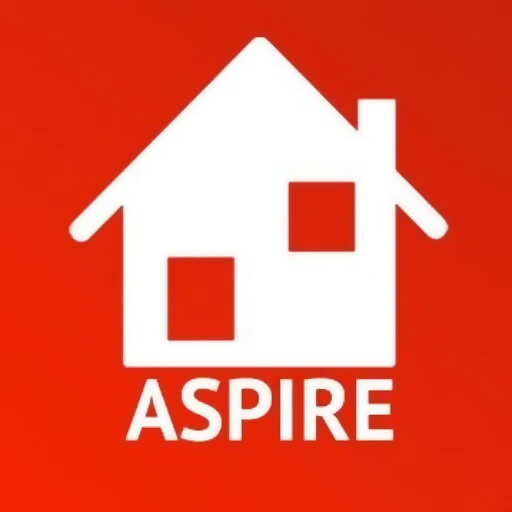
- Leader: Lutfur Rahman
- Treasurer: Jahed Choudhury
- Nominating Officer: Lipsa Ahmed
- Founded: 26 January 2018
- Preceded by: Tower Hamlets First
- Headquarters: 28 Castlemain Street; Whitechapel; London
- Ideology: Democratic socialism; Ethnic politics; Populism
- Political position: Syncretic; Fiscal: Left-wing; Social: Centre-right
- Tower Hamlets Council: 33 / 45
- Directly elected single authority mayors in England: 1 / 13

Website
- aspireparty.uk

Aspire is a local political party in the London Borough of Tower Hamlets, England, formed by Lutfur Rahman and councillors elected as members of his Tower Hamlets First party. After Tower Hamlets First was removed from the register of political parties following voting fraud and malpractice, its councillors formed the Tower Hamlets Independent Group (THIG). After some defections, the remaining Tower Hamlets Independent Group councillors registered formally as a political party under the Aspire name in 2018. With a few exceptions, most of its elected members were former Labour Party members.

It was the largest political opposition on Tower Hamlets Council before the 2018 May elections and then gained majority control of the council in the 2022 election, winning 24 of the council's 45 seats. Rahman was also re-elected mayor in those elections. In the 2026 election, the party won 33 seats.

== Background ==
Tower Hamlets First was established by Lutfur Rahman on 18 September 2013. Formerly the Labour leader of Tower Hamlets council, Rahman had been elected as Mayor as an independent in 2010 after Labour blocked his candidacy. The party stood candidates in the 2014 Tower Hamlets Council election, where it won 18 out of 45 seats, becoming the second-largest party on Tower Hamlets Council and the fifth-largest political party out of all London borough councils. The party was suspended on 23 April 2015, after an election court report that found Rahman "personally guilty of 'corrupt or illegal practices' or both" with the party labelled as a "one-man band". The party was removed from the list of political parties maintained by the Electoral Commission on 29 April 2015.

Following the dissolution of Tower Hamlets First, the majority of former party members established the Tower Hamlets Independent Group (THIG) to co-ordinate activity on the council. Six members subsequently left the Tower Hamlets Independent Group to form the competing People's Alliance group. The remaining THIG councillors then became Aspire.

Although then barred from running for elected office himself, Rahman was behind the party. Aspire was his second attempt at a new party after an application under the name 'Tower Hamlets Together' was rejected.

== Ideology ==
The ideology of the party is self-described as a form of democratic socialism. It has been criticised for only fielding candidates of Bangladeshi heritage for the 2022 Tower Hamlets local election, with only three of their candidates being female. Shortly after these elections, new allegations over voter intimidation, family voting and impersonating voters were raised by independent observers.

== Initial representation ==
Between its formation and the May 2018 elections, Aspire councillors occupied 10 of the 45 council seats on the Tower Hamlets Council.

Name	Ward
Ohid Ahmed	Lansbury
Suluk Ahmed	Spitalfields & Banglatown
Mahbub Alam	St Dunstan's
Gulam Kibria Choudhury	Poplar
Harun Miah	Shadwell
Md. Maium Miah	Canary Wharf
Mohammed Mufti Miah	Bromley North
Muhammad Ansar Mustaquim	St Peter's
Oliur Rahman	Stepney Green
Gulam Robbani	Spitalfields & Banglatown

Ohid Ahmed was a senior Labour Party councillor as a cabinet member between 2002 and 2010. He was also the Labour Party candidate for West Suffolk in 2010, and Deputy Mayor of Tower Hamlets between 2010 and 2014. Harun Miah was formerly a Respect Party Councillor. Maium Miah was formerly a Conservative Party councillor for Millwall before joining Tower Hamlets First, and stood in Canary Wharf ward in 2014.

The party's general secretary, Lillian Collins, was formerly Labour's chair in Tower Hamlets.

== Election results ==
=== Mayoral elections ===
Election	Candidate	1st	2nd
2018	Ohid Ahmed	14.3%	Eliminated
2022	Lutfur Rahman	47.0%	54.9%
2026	Lutfur Rahman	38.8%	—N/a

While Rahman was still subject to a five year ban on running for or holding public office, the party stood Ohid Ahmed in the 2018 election for Mayor of Tower Hamlets. Despite Rahman's endorsement, Ahmed garnered less than 15% of the vote, failing to qualify for the second round and coming third behind Labour, and the People's Alliance of Tower Hamlets, a group that had split from the councillors that would go on to form Aspire.

With the expiry of his ban on running, Rahman was made Aspire's candidate for the 2022 mayoral election and defeated Labour incumbent John Biggs in the second round with a 9.8 point majority, becoming mayor for a second time.

Rahman would win a second term in 2026 against the Labour and Green candidates, however he received roughly 4,000 less votes than in 2022, losing 8 points.

=== Borough Council elections ===
Year	Votes	%	+/-	Seats	+/-	Government
Tower Hamlets London Borough Council
2018	26,513	15.4%	New	0 / 45	▼10	Extra-Parliamentary
2022	69,141	36.9%	▲21.5%	24 / 45	▲24	Majority
2026	67,695	32.3%	▼4.6%	33 / 45	▲9	Supermajority

==== 2018 Borough Council election ====
On 4 April 2018, Aspire launched its campaign for the borough elections in Tower Hamlets, with a full slate of 45 council candidates. Despite winning the second most votes, all ten of its councillors lost re-election and it won no new seats.

==== By-elections 2018–2022 ====
Between the elections of 2018 and 2022, Aspire stood in three local by-elections, winning with Harun Miah in Shadwell ward and Kabir Ahmed in Weavers ward, while former mayoral candidate Ohid Ahmed came second in Lansbury ward.

==== 2022 Borough Council election ====
In the 2022 Tower Hamlets London Borough Council election, Aspire was successful in winning a majority with 24 out of 45 seats, more than doubling its vote share.

==== 2026 Borough Council election ====
In the 2026 Tower Hamlets London Borough Council election, Aspire won a supermajority with 33 out of 45 seats, despite losing votes.

== See also ==
- List of Labour Party breakaway parties (UK)
