= 2002 Tower Hamlets London Borough Council election =

- 2 May 2002

All 51 seats up for election to Tower Hamlets London Borough Council 26 seats needed for a majority
- Registered: 136,572
- Turnout: 41,613, 30.47% (▼5.60)

	First party	Second party	Third party
Leader	Helal U. Abbas	Unknown	Unknown
Party	Labour	Liberal Democrats	Conservative
Leader since	2001	Unknown	Unknown
Leader's seat	Spitalfields and Banglatown	Unknown	Unknown
Last election	41 seats, 54.47%	9 seats, 25.74%	0 seats, 10.29%
Seats before	42	8	0
Seats won	35	16	0
Seat change	▼6	▲7	Steady
Popular vote	52,200	34,928	17,210
Percentage	45.74%	30.60%	15.08%
Swing	▼8.73	▲4.86	▲4.79
- Map of the results of the 2002 Tower Hamlets council election. Labour in red and Liberal Democrats in yellow.
Council control before election
Labour
Council control after election
Labour

Elections to Tower Hamlets London Borough Council were held on 2 May 2002. The whole council was up for election with boundary changes since the last election in 1998 increasing the number of seats by 1. The Labour party kept overall control of the council.

== Background ==
=== Council Composition ===
In between the 1998 election and this election, there was one by-election held to replace a councillor who had died which resulted in Labour gaining a seat from the Liberal Democrats. As a result of this, the composition of the council just before the election was as follows:

↓
42	8
Labour	Lib Dem

=== Redistricting ===
Along with all other London Borough Councils, Tower Hamlets went through a major redistricting that went into effect for this election. The changes were as follows:

==== Wards Created ====
- Blackwall and Cubitt Town (3) - created from parts of Blackwall and Millwall wards
- Bromley-by-Bow (3) - Created from parts of Bromley and Lansbury wards
- Mile End and Globe Town (3) - Created from parts of Holy Trinity, St Dunstan's, St James' and St Peter's wards
- Mile End East (3) - Created from parts of Bromley and Limehouse wards
- St Dustan's and Stepney Green (3) - Created from parts of St Dunstan's and Redcoat wards
- St Katharine's and Wapping (3) - Created from parts of St Katharine's and Shadwell wards
- Whitechapel (3) - Created from parts of St Katharine's, St Mary's and Redcoat wards

==== Wards Eliminated ====
- Blackwall (2) - Land split between Blackwall and Cubitt Town, Limehouse and Millwall wards
- Bromley (3) - Land split between Bromley-by-Bow and Mile End East wards
- Grove (2) - Land became party of the new Bow West ward
- Holy Trinity (3) - Land split between Bethnal Green South and Mile End and Globe Town wards
- Park (2) - Land split between Bow East and Bow West wards
- Redcoat (2) - Land split between St Dunstan's and Stepney Green and Whitechapel wards
- St Dunstan's (3) - Land split between St Dunstan's and Stepney Green and Mile End and Globe Town wards
- St James' (2) - Land split between Bethnal Green North and Mile End and Globe Town wards
- St Katharine's (3) - Land split between St Katharine's and Wapping, Shadwell and Whitechapel wards.
- St Mary's (2) - Land absorbed into the new Whitechapel ward
- St Peter's (3) - Land split between Bethnal Green North and Bethnal Green South wards

==== Wards Renamed ====
- Spitalfields (3) - Renamed to Spitalfields and Banglatown

==== Wards Merged ====
- East India (2) and Lansbury (3) - merged into East India and Lansbury (3)

==== Wards Split ====
- Bow (3) - Split into Bow East (3) and Bow West (3).

== Election result ==
2002 Tower Hamlet London Borough Council local elections
Party	Seats	Gains	Losses	Net gain/loss	Seats %	Votes %	Votes	+/−
Labour	35	23 (Note: losses and gains include both those from eliminated seats and new seats as well as those from seats that changed hands)	29	▼6	68.63	45.74	52,200	▼8.73
Liberal Democrats	16	16	9	▲7	31.37	30.60	34,928	▲4.86
Conservative	0	0	0	Steady	0.00	15.08	17,210	▲4.79
Green	0	0	0	Steady	0.00	4.73	5,399	New
Independent	0	0	0	Steady	0.00	2.05	2,338	▼1.26
London Socialist	0	0	0	Steady	0.00	1.07	1,224	New
New Britain	0	0	0	Steady	0.00	0.41	470	New
BNP	0	0	0	Steady	0.00	0.32	366	▼1.99
Total	51						114,135	

Shortly after the election, Luftur Ali was disqualified from the election he won in Blackwall and Cubitt Town as it was discovered he was ineligible to be a councillor due to his job. A by-election was held on 27 June 2002 to replace him, electing Brian Son of the Labour Party to fill the seat.

After the elections, the council composition was as follows:

↓
35	16
Labour	Lib Dem

== Ward results ==
(*) - Indicates an incumbent candidate

(†) - Indicates an incumbent candidate standing in a different ward

=== Bethnal Green North ===
Bethnal Green North (3)
Party	Candidate	Votes	%	±%
Liberal Democrats	Azizur R. Khan	1,224	43.47	New
Liberal Democrats	John D.M. Griffiths	1,192		
Liberal Democrats	James R. Sanderson	1,097		
Labour	Stephen J. Beckett	878	31.88	New
Labour	Raja Miah^{†} (Note: Miah was a sitting councillor representing the now defunct St Peter's ward)	866		
Labour	Diana R. Johnson^{†} (Note: Johnson was a sitting councillor representing the now defunct Lansbury)	833		
Green	David Cox	233	7.44	New
Green	Anna K. Hoad-Reddick	202		
Conservative	Sajjadur Rahman	196	6.78	New
Conservative	David G. Ceasar	185		
Conservative	Brajendra N. Chaudhuri	167		
Green	Neil J. Thompson	166		
BNP	William F. Wren	162	6.01	New
London Socialist	Glyn Robbins	119	4.42	New
Registered electors		8,289		New
Turnout		2,674	32.26	New
Rejected ballots		10	0.37	New
Liberal Democrats win (new seat)				
Liberal Democrats win (new seat)				
Liberal Democrats win (new seat)				

=== Bethnal Green South ===
Bethnal Green South (3)
Party	Candidate	Votes	%	±%
Labour	Sirajul Islam^{†} (Note: Islam was a sitting councillor representing the now defunct Holy Trinity ward. He was elected in a by-election triggered by the death of Cllr. Albert J. Snooks in 2001)	1,385	43.94	New
Liberal Democrats	Akikor Rahman	1,384	43.37	New
Labour	Salim Ullah^{†} (Note: Ullah was a sitting councillor representing the now defunct Holy Trinity ward.)	1,331		
Liberal Democrats	Nurul Karim	1,309		
Labour	Raymond V. Marney^{†} (Note: Marney was a sitting councillor representing the now defunct St Peter's ward)	1,281		
Liberal Democrats	Robert Waites	1,252		
Conservative	Shahin Ahmed	239	6.83	New
Conservative	Anamul Haque	201		
Green	Jonathan Hackett	190	5.86	New
Conservative	Nicholas Sellick	181		
Green	Peter Howell	177		
Green	Gizelle Rush	166		
Registered electors		8,636		New
Turnout		3,190	36.94	New
Rejected ballots		18	0.56	New
Labour win (new seat)				
Liberal Democrats win (new seat)				
Labour win (new seat)				

=== Blackwall and Cubitt Town ===
Blackwall and Cubitt Town (3)
Party	Candidate	Votes	%	±%
Labour	Lutfur R. Ali	876	44.57	New
Labour	Julia Mainwaring^{†} (Note: Mainwaring was a sitting councillor representing the Millwall ward)	865		
Labour	Anthony J. Sharpe	793		
Conservative	Timothy J. Archer	568	28.12	New
Conservative	Patricia J. Napier	534		
Conservative	Simon P. Rouse	497		
Liberal Democrats	Barrie A. Blandford	350	15.97	New
Liberal Democrats	Alison J. Sanderson	310		
Liberal Democrats	Richard J.W. Ottaway	248		
Independent	Eric Pemberton	215	11.34	New
Registered electors		9,081		New
Turnout		1,951	21.48	New
Rejected ballots		15	0.77	New
Labour win (new seat)				
Labour win (new seat)				
Labour win (new seat)				

=== Bow East ===
Bow East (3)
Party	Candidate	Votes	%	±%
Liberal Democrats	Raymond G. Gipson^{†} (Note: Gipson and Williams were sitting councillor representing the now defunct Bow ward)	1,248	62.17	New
Liberal Democrats	Nigel E.R. McCollum	1,204		
Liberal Democrats	Marian Williams^{†}	1,155		
Labour	Rupert Bawden	519	25.63	New
Labour	Alexander K. Heslop^{†} (Note: Heslop was a sitting councillor representing the St Mary's ward)	493		
Labour	David Guppy	475		
Green	Jessica F.N. Lack	136	6.43	New
Green	Benjamin D. Holt	125		
Conservative	Alastair Holmes	120	5.77	New
Conservative	Susanna G. Webb	116		
Green	Volker Heineman	112		
Conservative	Timothy Hudspith	99		
Registered electors		7,056		New
Turnout		1,951	27.65	New
Rejected ballots		13	0.67	New
Liberal Democrats win (new seat)				
Liberal Democrats win (new seat)				
Liberal Democrats win (new seat)				

=== Bow West ===
Bow West (3)
Party	Candidate	Votes	%	±%
Liberal Democrats	Janet Ludlow^{†} (Note: Ludlow was a sitting councillor representing the now defunct Grove ward)	1,350	43.78	New
Liberal Democrats	Hilary S. Phelps	1,149		
Liberal Democrats	Martin J. Rew	1,115		
Labour	Ala Uddin^{†} (Note: Uddin was a sitting councillor representing the Spitalfields ward)	946	33.58	New
Labour	Belle Harris	939		
Labour	Geoffrey Thorington-Hassel	887		
Green	Janice D. Cartwright	280	10.08	New
Green	Sandra J. McLeod	275		
Conservative	Kazi N. Alam	225	6.46	New
London Socialist	Sheila McGregor	168	6.10	New
Conservative	Francis A.C.S. Brown	155		
Conservative	Simon M. Gordon-Clark	153		
Registered electors		8,035		New
Turnout		2,771	34.49	New
Rejected ballots		7	0.25	New
Liberal Democrats win (new seat)				
Liberal Democrats win (new seat)				
Liberal Democrats win (new seat)				

=== Bromley-by-Bow ===
Bromley-by-Bow (3)
Party	Candidate	Votes	%	±%
Labour	David J. Edgar^{†} (Note: Edgar was a sitting councillor representing the Limehouse ward)	1,650	70.04	New
Labour	Abdul A. Sardar	1,641		
Labour	Khaled R. Khan	1,586		
Liberal Democrats	Brian L. Abson	353	14.11	New
Liberal Democrats	Abdul Mannan	320		
Liberal Democrats	Phyllis D. Sheehan	310		
Green	Matthew S. Corbishley	225	7.69	New
Conservative	James McLachlan	204	8.16	New
Conservative	Barbara J. Perrott	186		
Conservative	Robert J.McG. Neill	178		
Green	Hidr Yildirim	132		
Registered electors		7,407		New
Turnout		2,526	34.10	New
Rejected ballots		18	0.71	New
Labour win (new seat)				
Labour win (new seat)				
Labour win (new seat)				

=== East India and Lansbury ===
East India and Lansbury (3)
Party	Candidate	Votes	%	±%
Labour	Ali M.O. Ahmed	1,015	38.62	New
Liberal Democrats	Rajib Ahmed^{†} (Note: Ahmed was a sitting councillor representing the now defunct East India ward. He was initially elected as a Labour councillor but has since joined the Liberal Democrats.)	869	30.92	New
Labour	Kevin V. Morton^{†} (Note: Morton was a sitting councillor representing the now defunct Lansbury ward)	771		
Labour	Ron M. Harley	756		
Liberal Democrats	Harry S. Pavitt	583		
Liberal Democrats	Robert Wallace	583		
London Socialist	Kambiz Boomla	261	11.90	New
Conservative	Peter Golds	253	10.45	New
Conservative	Gareth L. Kennedy	239		
Conservative	Gillian Thomas	196		
Independent	Mohammed A. Haque	178	8.11	New
Registered electors		7,634		New
Turnout		2,171	28.44	New
Rejected ballots		11	0.51	New
Labour win (new seat)				
Liberal Democrats win (new seat)				
Labour win (new seat)				

=== Limehouse ===
Limehouse (3)
Party	Candidate	Votes	%	±%
Labour	Ashton McGregor	1,026	46.15	▲19.80
Labour	Judith A. Gardiner	1,003		
Labour	Khan A. Murshid^{†} (Note: Murshid was a sitting councillor representing the now defunct Blackwall ward)	917		
Liberal Democrats	Russell P. Neale	414	18.56	▲5.02
Liberal Democrats	Elizabeth E. Langley	413		
London Socialist	Mark Weeks	391	18.37	New
Conservative	Philip J. Briscoe	377	16.92	▲12.19
Conservative	Antonio E. Bello	364		
Liberal Democrats	Richard Winfield	358		
Conservative	Christopher D. Godfrey	339		
Registered electors		8,678		▲2,503
Turnout		2,280	26.27	▼12.69
Rejected ballots		6	0.26	▼0.86
Labour win (new boundaries)				
Labour win (new boundaries)				
Labour win (new boundaries)				

=== Mile End and Globe ===
Mile End and Globe (3)
Party	Candidate	Votes	%	±%
Liberal Democrats	Mohammed J.U. Chowdhury	1,108	43.98	New
Labour	Rofique U. Ahmed	1,042	36.54	New
Liberal Democrats	Barrie C. Duffey^{†} (Note: Duffey was a sitting councillor representing the now defunct Holy Trinity ward)	1,008		
Liberal Democrats	Rosina S. Tucker	950		
Labour	Sharmin Shajahan	778		
Labour	Graham M. Taylor	727		
Conservative	Jahidul Hoque	326	10.29	New
Green	Christopher W. Coombes	267	9.20	New
Green	Amelia J. Gordon	218		
Conservative	Michael J.G. Fletcher	217		
Conservative	Mohammad R. Karim	174		
Green	Jeremy G. Hicks	156		
Registered electors		8,045		New
Turnout		2,547	31.66	New
Rejected ballots		11	0.43	New
Liberal Democrats win (new seat)				
Labour win (new seat)				
Liberal Democrats win (new seat)				

=== Mile End East ===
Mile End East (3)
Party	Candidate	Votes	%	±%
Labour	Helal Rahman	1,326	53.92	New
Labour	Motin Uz-Zaman^{†} (Note: Uz-Zaman was a sitting councillor representing the now defunct St Mary's ward)	1,303		
Labour	Abdus Salique	1,254		
Liberal Democrats	Mohammed S. Rahman	792	32.24	New
Liberal Democrats	Bernard Cameron	791		
Liberal Democrats	Rick C.W.M. Pollock	739		
Conservative	John S. Livingstone	242	9.55	New
Conservative	Simon Armand-Smith	233		
Conservative	Stephen P. Charge	213		
Independent	Bill Wakefield	103	4.29	New
Registered electors		7,196		New
Turnout		2,468	34.30	New
Rejected ballots		22	0.89	New
Labour win (new seat)				
Labour win (new seat)				
Labour win (new seat)				

=== Millwall ===
Millwall (3)
Party	Candidate	Votes	%	±%
Labour	Alan T. Amos	1,089	48.00	▼13.18
Labour	Betheline Chattopadhyay^{†} (Note: Chattopadhyay was a sitting councillor representing the Bromley ward)	986		
Labour	Mumtaz Samad	970		
Conservative	Philip W. Groves	446	20.30	▲7.44
Conservative	Paul W.E. Ingham	422		
Conservative	Alison L. Newton	420		
Liberal Democrats	Malcolm J.M. Cuthbert	313	12.59	▲3.52
Liberal Democrats	Jean Stokes	245		
Liberal Democrats	Ian K. McDonald	241		
BNP	Gordon T. Callow	204	9.65	▼7.24
London Socialist	Susan Gibson	200	9.46	New
Registered electors		9,302		▼2,889
Turnout		2,045	21.98	▼11.90
Rejected ballots		7	0.34	▼0.17
Labour win (new boundaries)				
Labour win (new boundaries)				
Labour win (new boundaries)				

=== St Dunstan's and Stepney Green ===
St Dunstan's and Stepney Green (3)
Party	Candidate	Votes	%	±%
Labour	Ataur Rahman^{†} (Note: Rahman was a sitting councillor representing the now defunct Redcoat ward)	1,232	48.60	New
Labour	Nasir Uddin	1,226		
Labour	Mohammed S. Uddin^{†} (Note: Uddin was a sitting councillor representing the now defunct St Dustans ward)	1,105		
Conservative	Hafizur Rahman	828	26.08	New
Conservative	Shamim A. Choudhury	566		
Conservative	Muhammade M. Hoque	518		
Liberal Democrats	Paula E.A. Palmer	418	15.15	New
Liberal Democrats	George A. Crozier	393		
Liberal Democrats	Mohibur Rahman	300		
Green	Miriam P. Dodd	269	10.17	New
Green	Craig T. Williams	261		
Green	Frances Schwartz	216		
Registered electors		8,926		New
Turnout		2,833	31.74	New
Rejected ballots		23	0.81	New
Labour win (new seat)				
Labour win (new seat)				
Labour win (new seat)				

=== St Katharine's and Wapping ===
St Katharine's and Wapping (3)
Party	Candidate	Votes	%	±%
Labour	Denise Jones^{†} (Note: Jones was a sitting councillor representing the now defunct St Katharines ward)	1,082	43.10	New
Labour	Shafiqul Haque	1,049		
Labour	Richard D. Brooks	1,034		
Conservative	Kevin A. Noles	842	31.87	New
Conservative	William G.D. Norton	766		
Conservative	Toby N. Vintcent	733		
Liberal Democrats	Mohammed F-U. Ahmed	470	15.43	New
Liberal Democrats	Marian Elsden	345		
Liberal Democrats	Alexandra E. Sugden	318		
New Britain	Dennis W. Delderfield	259	9.60	New
New Britain	John Divito	211		
Registered electors		8,508		New
Turnout		2,532	29.76	New
Rejected ballots		18	0.71	New
Labour win (new seat)				
Labour win (new seat)				
Labour win (new seat)				

=== Shadwell ===
Shadwell (3)
Party	Candidate	Votes	%	±%
Labour	Manir U. Ahmed	1,265	59.53	▲10.91
Labour	Michael J. Keith*	1,188		
Labour	Abdus Shukur*	1,076		
Liberal Democrats	Nanu Miah	512	20.82	New
Conservative	William D. Crossey	429	19.65	▼1.79
Conservative	Richard H. Powell	402		
Liberal Democrats	Catherine E. Buttimer	395		
Conservative	Maxwell W. Rumney	334		
Liberal Democrats	Gary J. Marsh	327		
Registered electors		7,872		▼142
Turnout		2,162	27.46	▼4.38
Rejected ballots		14	0.65	▼0.96
Labour win (new boundaries)				
Labour win (new boundaries)				
Labour win (new boundaries)				

=== Spitalfields and Banglatown ===
Spitalfields and Banglatown (3)
Party	Candidate	Votes	%	±%
Labour	Helal U. Abbas^{†} (Note: Abbas was a sitting councillor representing the Limehouse ward)	936	42.60	New
Labour	Ghulam Mortuza^{†} (Note: Mortuza was a sitting councillor representing the now defunct Spitalfields ward)	848		
Labour	Lutfur Rahman	846		
Conservative	Md A.D. Rahman	400	16.47	New
Conservative	Pir M.A. Quium	345		
Conservative	David Webb	272		
Liberal Democrats	Ahmed Hussain	255	10.35	New
Green	Keith O. Magnum	198	7.68	New
Liberal Democrats	Melvin M. Ramsay	198		
Liberal Democrats	Alas Uddin	186		
Independent	Muhit Ahmed	157	7.63	New
Green	Annika Sanders	146		
Independent	Ismail K. Malik	137	6.66	New
Green	Kerry Seager	130		
Independent	Alexander P. Vracas	124	6.03	New
Independent	Sultan Ahmed	53	2.58	New
Registered electors		5,930		New
Turnout		1,876	31.64	New
Rejected ballots		13	0.69	New
Labour win (new boundaries)				
Labour win (new boundaries)				
Labour win (new boundaries)				

=== Weavers ===
Weavers (3)
Party	Candidate	Votes	%	±%
Liberal Democrats	Abdul Matin	1,588	52.64	▲23.09
Liberal Democrats	Louise Alexander	1,397		
Liberal Democrats	Timothy J. O'Flaherty	1,298		
Labour	Sirajul Islam	925	31.66	▼9.30
Labour	Humaiun Kobir	919		
Labour	Eric McG. Taylor	732		
Conservative	Mohammed A. Kadir	295	7.09	▲0.90
Green	Benjamin E. Hancocks	204	6.73	New
Green	Marc Weaver	184		
Green	Stephen A. Wood	159		
Conservative	Jane E.P. Meehan	145		
Conservative	Joanna Noles	137		
Independent	Matt Bass	51	1.88	New
Registered electors		7,907		▲651
Turnout		2,842	35.94	▼4.18
Rejected ballots		20	0.70	▼0.36
Liberal Democrats win (new boundaries)				
Liberal Democrats win (new boundaries)				
Liberal Democrats win (new boundaries)				

=== Whitechapel ===
Whitechapel (3)
Party	Candidate	Votes	%	±%
Labour	Abdul Asad^{†} (Note: Asad was a sitting councillor representing the St Katharines ward)	1,263	33.95	New
Labour	Fanu Miah	1,142		
Labour	Doros Ullah	1,125		
Conservative	Mostafa Miah	592	14.75	New
Conservative	Shafique Miah	475		
Conservative	Monsur A. Ahmed	466		
Independent	Mohamed Z. Ahmed	462	13.33	New
Independent	Shamsuddin Ahmed	451	13.01	New
Independent	Anu Miah	407	11.74	New
Liberal Democrats	Deborah A. O'Flaherty	212	5.27	New
Green	Jacqueline Goodman	205	5.50	New
Green	Brendon O'Connor	200		
Liberal Democrats	Sajaul Karim	174		
Green	Melina La Firenze	167		
Liberal Democrats	Gulam Hossain	162		
London Socialist	Philip Billows	85	2.45	New
Registered electors		8,070		New
Turnout		2,696	33.41	New
Rejected ballots		26	0.96	New
Labour win (new seat)				
Labour win (new seat)				
Labour win (new seat)				
