= Blackwall and Cubitt Town =

- Electoral ward for the Tower Hamlets London Borough Council
- Blackwall and Cubitt Town ward boundaries since 2014
- Borough: Tower Hamlets
- County: Greater London
- Population: 21,426 (2021)
- Electorate: 14,091 (2022)
- Major settlements: Blackwall, Cubitt Town and Leamouth
- Area: 1.683 square kilometres (0.650 sq mi)

Current electoral ward
- Created: 2002
- Councillors: 3
- ONS code: 00BGFY (2002–2014)
- GSS code: E05000575 (2002–2014); E05009318 (2014–present)

Blackwall and Cubitt Town is an electoral ward in the London Borough of Tower Hamlets. The ward was first used in the 2002 elections. It returns councillors to Tower Hamlets London Borough Council.

== Tower Hamlets council elections since 2014 ==
There was a revision of ward boundaries in Tower Hamlets in 2014.

=== 2022 election ===
The election took place on 5 May 2022.

2022 Tower Hamlets London Borough Council election: Blackwall and Cubitt Town (3)
Party	Candidate	Votes	%	±%
Aspire	Abdul Malik	1,374	29.86	+11.62
Aspire	Ahmodur Khan	1,318	28.64	+13.06
Aspire	Muhammad Uddin	1,292	28.07	+11.33
Labour	Afsana Lachaux	1,129	24.53	−8.31
Labour	Christopher Worrall	1,112	24.16	−7.71
Labour	Mohammed Pappu	1,001	21.75	−6.30
Conservative	Sofia De Sousa	869	18.88	−3.87
Conservative	Matthew Miles	777	16.88	−3.91
Conservative	Nick Vandyke	745	16.19	−4.52
Liberal Democrats	Guy Benson	673	14.62	−0.84
Green	Caroline Fenton	554	12.04	+3.77
Liberal Democrats	Richard Flowers	551	11.97	−2.51
Liberal Democrats	Azizur Khan	528	11.47	+2.12
Green	Seamus Hayes	364	7.91	+0.03
Green	Tamsin Kavanagh	359	7.80	+1.72
Rejected ballots		57		
Turnout		4,602	32.66	−1.63
Registered electors		14,091		
Aspire gain from Labour		Swing		
Aspire gain from Labour		Swing		
Aspire gain from Labour		Swing		

=== 2018 election ===
The election took place on 3 May 2018.

2018 Tower Hamlets London Borough Council election: Blackwall and Cubitt Town (3)
Party	Candidate	Votes	%	±%
Labour	Candida Ronald	1,275	32.84	+2.64
Labour	Ehtasham Haque	1,237	31.87	−1.13
Labour	Mohammed Pappu	1,089	28.05	−2.05
Conservative	Alexander Kay	883	22.75	−7.52
Conservative	Sofia Sousa	807	20.79	−7.34
Conservative	Nick Vandyke	804	20.71	−5.59
Aspire	Abdul Malik	708	18.24	N/A
Aspire	Muhammad Uddin	650	16.74	N/A
Aspire	Mohammed Rahman	605	15.58	N/A
Liberal Democrats	Stephen Clarke	600	15.46	+13.01
Liberal Democrats	Gabriella de Ferry	562	14.48	+12.13
Liberal Democrats	Antonio Munoz Moreno	363	9.35	+7.35
Green	Thomas Fea	321	8.27	+4.47
Green	Mark Lomas	306	7.88	+4.50
PATH	Shahena Nessa	287	7.39	N/A
Green	David Hoole	236	6.08	+3.53
Rejected ballots		35		
Turnout		3,917	34.29	
Registered electors		11,422		
Labour hold		Swing		
Labour gain from Conservative		Swing		
Labour hold		Swing		

=== 2014 election ===
The election took place on 22 May 2014.

2014 Tower Hamlets London Borough Council election: Blackwall and Cubitt Town (3)
Party	Candidate	Votes	%	±%
Labour	Dave Chesterton	956	33.00	
Conservative	Christopher Chapman	877	30.27	
Labour	Candida Ronald	875	30.20	
Labour	Anisur Rahman	872	30.10	
Conservative	Gloria Thienel	815	28.13	
Conservative	Geeta Kasanga	762	26.30	
Tower Hamlets First	Faruk Khan	744	25.68	
Tower Hamlets First	Kabir Ahmed	726	25.06	
Tower Hamlets First	Mohammed Aktaruzzaman	713	24.61	
UKIP	Diana Lochner	240	8.28	
UKIP	Paul Shea	190	6.56	
UKIP	Anthony Registe	188	6.49	
Green	Katy Guttmann	110	3.80	
Green	Mark Lomas	98	3.38	
Green	Chris Smith	74	2.55	
Liberal Democrats	Elaine Bagshaw	71	2.45	
Liberal Democrats	Richard Flowers	68	2.35	
Liberal Democrats	Stephen Clarke	58	2.00	
TUSC	Ellen Peers	11	0.38	
TUSC	John Peers	11	0.38	
Independent	Mohammed Rahman	11	0.38	
Turnout		2,909	31.64	
Labour win (new boundaries)				
Conservative win (new boundaries)				
Labour win (new boundaries)				

== 2002–2014 Tower Hamlets council elections ==
Blackwall and Cubitt Town ward boundaries from 2002 to 2014

There was a revision of ward boundaries in Tower Hamlets in 2002.

=== 2010 election ===
The election on 6 May 2010 took place on the same day as the United Kingdom general election.

2010 Tower Hamlets London Borough Council election: Blackwall and Cubitt Town (3)
Party	Candidate	Votes	%	±%
Conservative	Tim Archer	2,945		
Conservative	Peter Golds	2,095		
Conservative	Gloria Theniel	2,045		
Labour	Wais Islam	1,729		
Labour	Kathy McTasney	1,658		
Labour	Crissy Townsend	1,581		
Liberal Democrats	Martin Carr	1,250		
Liberal Democrats	Freda Graf	1,097		
Liberal Democrats	John Griffiths	953		
Respect	Gulan Choudhury	799		
Respect	Mohammed Rahman	627		
Respect	Abdul Malik	577		
Turnout			54.86	
Conservative hold		Swing		
Conservative hold		Swing		
Conservative hold		Swing		

=== 2006 election ===
The election took place on 4 May 2006.

2006 Tower Hamlets London Borough Council election: Blackwall and Cubitt Town (3)
Party	Candidate	Votes	%	±%
Conservative	Tim Archer	1,317	34.4	
Conservative	Philip Briscoe	1,197		
Conservative	Peter Golds	1,142		
Labour	Julia Mainwaring	990	25.9	
Labour	Brian Son	903		
Labour	Anthony Sharpe	888		
Liberal Democrats	Shofu Miah	652	17.1	
Respect	Abdul Chowdhury	502	13.1	
Liberal Democrats	Barry Blandford	463		
Respect	Aysha Ali	411		
Liberal Democrats	Jahidul Hoque	402		
Independent	Shamsur Choudhury	362	9.5	
Respect	Terence Wells	273		
Independent	Eric Pemberton	152		
Independent	Shelima Choudhury	75		
Independent	Najma Rahman	58		
Turnout			32.9	
Conservative gain from Labour		Swing		
Conservative gain from Labour		Swing		
Conservative gain from Labour		Swing		

=== 2002 by-election ===
A by-election took place on 27 June 2002, following the resignation of Lutfur Ali.

2002 Blackwall and Cubitt Town by-election
Party	Candidate	Votes	%	±%
Labour	Brian Son	686	31.3	−12.3
Conservative	Timothy J. Archer	676	30.8	+2.5
Liberal Democrats	Nurul Karim	361	16.4	−1.0
Independent	Terry D. Johns	252	11.5	+0.8
BNP	Gordon Callow	87	4.0	+4.0
Independent	Eric Pemberton	68	3.1	+3.1
Independent	Shah M. A. Haque	21	1.0	+1.0
New Britain	Dennis W. Delderfield	19	0.9	+0.9
Green	Keith O. Magnum	16	0.7	+0.7
Socialist Alliance	Theresa R. Selby	9	0.4	+0.4
Majority		10	0.5	
Turnout		2,195	24.0	
Labour hold		Swing		

=== 2002 election ===
The election took place on 2 May 2002.

2002 Tower Hamlets London Borough Council election: Blackwall and Cubitt Town (3)
Party	Candidate	Votes	%	±%
Labour	Lutfur Ali	876		
Labour	Julia Mainwaring	865		
Labour	Anthony Sharpe	793		
Conservative	Tim Archer	568		
Conservative	Patricia Napier	534		
Conservative	Simon Rouse	497		
Liberal Democrats	Barrie Blandford	350		
Liberal Democrats	Alison Sanderson	310		
Liberal Democrats	Richard Ottaway	248		
Independent	Eric Pemberton	215		
Turnout		5,256		
Labour win (new seat)				
Labour win (new seat)				
Labour win (new seat)				
