= Bow East =

- Electoral ward for the Tower Hamlets London Borough Council
- Bow East ward boundaries since 2014
- Borough: Tower Hamlets
- County: Greater London
- Population: 19,526 (2021)
- Electorate: 14,292 (2022)
- Area: 1.859 square kilometres (0.718 sq mi)

Current electoral ward
- Created: 2002
- Number of members: 3
- Councillors: Mads Churchhouse; Ottilie Swinyard; Jonathan Purcell
- ONS code: 00BGFZ (2002–2014)
- GSS code: E05000576 (2002–2014); E05009319 (2014–present)

Bow East is an electoral ward in the London Borough of Tower Hamlets. The ward was first used in the 2002 elections. It returns three councillors to Tower Hamlets London Borough Council.

== Councillors ==
Election	Councillors		
2002	Raymond Gipson (Liberal Democrats)	Nigel McCollum (Liberal Democrats)	Marian Williams (Liberal Democrats)
2006	Alexander Heslop (Labour Party)	Ahmed Omer (Labour Party)	Marc Francis (Labour Party)
2010	Carli Harper-Penman (Labour Party)	Ahmed Omer (Labour Party)	Marc Francis (Labour Party)
2014	Rachel Blake (Labour Party)	Amina Ali (Labour Party)	Marc Francis (Labour Party)
2018	Rachel Blake (Labour Party)	Amina Ali (Labour Party)	Marc Francis (Labour Party)
2022	Rachel Blake (Labour Party)	Amina Ali (Labour Party)	Marc Francis (Labour Party)
2026	Mads Churchhouse (Green Party)	Ottilie Swinyard (Green Party)	Jonathan Purcell (Green Party)

== Tower Hamlets council elections since 2014 ==
There was a revision of ward boundaries in Tower Hamlets in 2014.

=== 2026 election ===
The election took place on 7 May 2026.

2026 Tower Hamlets London Borough Council election: Bow East (3)
Party	Candidate	Votes	%	±%
Green	Mads Churchhouse	2,777		
Green	Ottilie Swinyard	2,603		
Green	Jonathan Purcell	2,550		
Labour Co-op	Marc Francis	1,873		
Labour Co-op	Amina Ali	1,711		
Labour Co-op	Abdi Mohamed	1,385		
Aspire	Yusuf Abdi	1,120		
Aspire	Mansur Hussain	1,087		
Aspire	Hamida Juti	1,068		
Reform	John Forster	559		
Reform	Gary Taylor	517		
Reform	Kevin Turner	444		
Liberal Democrats	Daniel Bond	262		
Tower Hamlets Independents	Md Chowdhury	186		
Conservative	Georgie Calle	180		
Conservative	Robin Edwards	178		
Liberal Democrats	Dan Lan	170		
Conservative	Jade Kelly	169		
Tower Hamlets Independents	Delwar Hira	140		
Tower Hamlets Independents	Md Islam	131		
Liberal Democrats	Folkert Veenstra	115		
TUSC	Naomi Byron			
Turnout				
Rejected ballots		36		
Green gain from Labour				
Green gain from Labour				
Green gain from Labour				

=== 2024 by-election ===
The by-election took place on 12 September 2024, following the resignation of Rachel Blake.

2024 Bow East by-election
Party	Candidate	Votes	%	±%
Labour	Abdi Mohamed	1,266		
Green	Rupert George	722		
Conservative	Robin Edwards	239		
Liberal Democrats	Siobhan Proudfoot	148		
Majority				
Turnout				
Labour hold		Swing		

=== 2022 election ===
The election took place on 5 May 2022.

2022 Tower Hamlets London Borough Council election: Bow East (3)
Party	Candidate	Votes	%	±%
Labour Co-op	Rachel Blake	2,800	50.48	−8.17
Labour Co-op	Amina Ali	2,728	49.18	−3.02
Labour Co-op	Marc Francis	2,341	42.20	−13.40
Aspire	Rahima Khatun	1,324	23.87	+13.29
Aspire	Masood Rahman	1,228	22.14	+15.03
Aspire	Monzo Khaton	1,207	21.76	+14.84
Green	Nicola Power	964	17.38	+4.95
Green	Ellis Bright	910	16.41	+6.65
Liberal Democrats	Liza Franchi	506	9.12	+1.42
Conservative	Robin Edwards	336	6.06	−1.20
Conservative	Lesley Lincoln	291	5.25	−2.28
Liberal Democrats	Simon Herbert	285	5.14	−2.24
Liberal Democrats	Richard MacMilan	282	5.08	−2.11
Conservative	Imogen Sinclair	247	4.45	−0.98
Rejected ballots		35		
Turnout		5,547	38.81	+0.68
Registered electors		14,292		
Labour hold		Swing		
Labour hold		Swing		
Labour hold		Swing		

=== 2018 election ===
The election took place on 3 May 2018.

2018 Tower Hamlets London Borough Council election: Bow East (3)
Party	Candidate	Votes	%	±%
Labour	Rachel Blake	2,789	58.65	+7.56
Labour	Marc Francis	2,644	55.60	+10.44
Labour	Amina Ali	2,482	52.20	+12.62
Green	David Cox	591	12.43	−5.86
Aspire	Foyzul Islam	503	10.58	N/A
Green	Farika Holden	464	9.76	−2.98
Green	Daniel Smith	416	8.75	N/A
PATH	Shah Bodruzzaman	390	8.20	N/A
Liberal Democrats	Eimear O'Casey	366	7.70	−1.08
Conservative	Sean Dempster	358	7.53	−2.64
Liberal Democrats	Ben Sims	346	7.28	N/A
Conservative	Robin Edwards	345	7.26	−2.44
Liberal Democrats	Koyes Choudhury	342	7.19	N/A
Aspire	Mohammed Rahman	338	7.11	N/A
Aspire	Mahamed Ismail	329	6.92	N/A
Conservative	Joseph Mycroft	258	5.43	−3.47
Rejected ballots		26		
Turnout		4,781	38.13	
Registered electors		12,961		
Labour hold		Swing		
Labour hold		Swing		
Labour hold		Swing		

=== 2014 election ===
The election took place on 22 May 2014.

2014 Tower Hamlets London Borough Council election: Bow East (3)
Party	Candidate	Votes	%	±%
Labour	Rachel Blake	2,611	51.09	
Labour	Marc Francis	2,308	45.16	
Labour	Amina Ali	2,023	39.58	
Tower Hamlets First	Sabia Kamali	989	19.35	
Tower Hamlets First	Abdus Salam	977	19.12	
Green	Lucy Rees	935	18.29	
Tower Hamlets First	Mickey Ambrose	774	15.14	
Green	Tatyana Hancocks	651	12.74	
Conservative	Cameron Penny	520	10.17	
Conservative	James Thompson	496	9.70	
Conservative	Stephanie Chan	455	8.90	
Liberal Democrats	Andy Spracklen	449	8.78	
TUSC	George Paton	221	4.32	
Red Flag Anti-Corruption	Andy Erlam	129	2.52	
Turnout		5,156	45.86	
Labour win (new boundaries)				
Labour win (new boundaries)				
Labour win (new boundaries)				

== 2002–2014 Tower Hamlets council elections ==
Bow East ward boundaries from 2002 to 2014

=== 2010 election ===
The election on 6 May 2010 took place on the same day as the United Kingdom general election.

2010 Tower Hamlets London Borough Council election: Bow East (3)
Party	Candidate	Votes	%	±%
Labour	Marc Francis	2,297		
Labour	Carli Harper-Penman	1,865		
Labour	Ahmed Omer	1,724		
Liberal Democrats	Dave Campbell	1204		
Liberal Democrats	Rafique Ullah	1040		
Liberal Democrats	Paolo Adragna	981		
Conservative	Claire Palmer	807		
Conservative	Philip Groves	799		
Conservative	Mark Walters	684		
Green	Marcus Boyle	547		
Respect	Mujibur Rahman	506		
Green	Alan Duffell	339		
BNP	Mike Underwood	318		
Green	Joseph Lucey	316		
Respect	Bryony Shanks	243		
Respect	Carole Swords	223		
Independent	Andrew Coles	152		
Independent	Emdadul Haque	95		
Independent	Gareth Thomas	92		
Turnout			58.63	
Labour hold		Swing		
Labour hold		Swing		
Labour hold		Swing		

=== 2006 election ===
The election took place on 4 May 2006.

2006 Tower Hamlets London Borough Council election: Bow East (3)
Party	Candidate	Votes	%	±%
Labour	Marc Francis	1,314	42.0	
Labour	Alexander Heslop	1,156		
Labour	Ahmed Omer	1,126		
Liberal Democrats	Raymond Gipson	918	29.3	
Liberal Democrats	Marian Williams	765		
Liberal Democrats	Andrew Sage	740		
Respect	Sahra Ali	366	11.7	
Conservative	Andrew Palmer	321	10.3	
Respect	Christopher Nineham	309		
Respect	Tansy Hoskins	307		
Conservative	Priti Heath	290		
Conservative	William Norton	286		
Green	Andrea Krug	209	6.7	
Green	Alana Jelinek	201		
Turnout			37.6	
Labour gain from Liberal Democrats		Swing		
Labour gain from Liberal Democrats		Swing		
Labour gain from Liberal Democrats		Swing		

=== 2002 election ===
The election took place on 2 May 2002.

2002 Tower Hamlets London Borough Council election: Bow East (3)
Party	Candidate	Votes	%	±%
Liberal Democrats	Raymond Gipson	1,248		
Liberal Democrats	Nigel McCollum	1,204		
Liberal Democrats	Marian Williams	1,155		
Labour	Rupert Bawden	519		
Labour	Alexander Heslop	493		
Labour	David Guppy	475		
Green	Jessica Lack	136		
Green	Benjamin Holt	125		
Conservative	Alastair Holmes	120		
Conservative	Susanna Webb	116		
Green	Volker Heineman	112		
Conservative	Timothy Hudspith	99		
Turnout		5,802		
Liberal Democrats win (new seat)				
Liberal Democrats win (new seat)				
Liberal Democrats win (new seat)				
