= St Katharine's and Wapping =

Electoral ward in the London borough of Tower Hamlets

- Electoral ward for the Tower Hamlets London Borough Council
- St Katharine's and Wapping ward boundaries since 2014
- Borough: Tower Hamlets
- County: Greater London
- Population: 11,961 (2021)
- Electorate: 8,843 (2022)
- Area: 1.001 square kilometres (0.386 sq mi)

Current electoral ward
- Created: 2002
- Councillors: 2002–2014: 3; 2014–present: 2
- ONS code: 00BGGJ (2002–2014)
- GSS code: E05000585 (2002–2014); E05009330 (2014–present)

St Katharine's and Wapping is an electoral ward in the London Borough of Tower Hamlets. The ward was first used in the 2002 elections. It returns councillors to Tower Hamlets London Borough Council.

== Tower Hamlets council elections since 2014 ==
There was a revision of ward boundaries in Tower Hamlets in 2014.

=== 2022 election ===
The election took place on 5 May 2022.

2022 Tower Hamlets London Borough Council election: St Katharine's and Wapping (2)
Party	Candidate	Votes	%	±%
Labour	Abdul Ullah	1,133	31.34	+2.56
Labour	Amy Lee	1,128	31.18	−4.46
Liberal Democrats	Dominic Buxton	961	26.56	+0.29
Liberal Democrats	Mahbub Alam	749	20.70	−2.04
Conservative	Neil King	612	16.92	−5.20
Conservative	Jane Emmerson	564	15.59	−11.05
Aspire	Abulkashem Helal	471	13.02	+9.12
Aspire	Khayrul Hasan	446	12.33	+11.38
Green	Oliver Barrs	374	10.34	+0.98
Green	Peter Simister	278	7.68	N/A
Rejected ballots				
Turnout		3,618	40.91	−1.58
Registered electors		8,843		
Labour hold		Swing		
Labour hold		Swing		

=== 2018 election ===
The election took place on 3 May 2018.

2018 Tower Hamlets London Borough Council election: St Katharine's and Wapping (2)
Party	Candidate	Votes	%	±%
Labour	Denise Jones	1,279	35.64	+3.32
Labour	Abdul Ullah	1,033	28.78	+3.20
Conservative	Kirsty Finlayson	956	26.64	−7.55
Liberal Democrats	Marie Cahill	943	26.27	+17.74
Liberal Democrats	Stephen O'Shea	816	22.74	N/A
Conservative	Neil King	794	22.12	−8.81
Green	Robert Crowston	336	9.36	−2.41
PATH	Masuma Begum	174	4.85	N/A
Aspire	Mohammad Mamun	140	3.90	N/A
Aspire	Altab Miah	34	0.95	N/A
Rejected ballots		24		
Turnout		3,613	42.49	
Registered electors		8,503		
Labour gain from Conservative		Swing		
Labour hold		Swing		

=== 2014 election ===
The election took place on 22 May 2014.

2014 Tower Hamlets London Borough Council election: St Katharine's and Wapping (2)
Party	Candidate	Votes	%	±%
Conservative	Julia Dockerill	1,278	34.19	
Labour	Denise Jones	1,208	32.32	
Conservative	Neil King	1,156	30.93	
Labour	Robert Scott	956	25.58	
Tower Hamlets First	Ahad Miah	547	14.63	
Green	John Venpin	440	11.77	
Tower Hamlets First	Stuart Madewell	407	10.89	
UKIP	Grenville Mills	353	9.44	
Liberal Democrats	John Denniston	319	8.53	
Turnout		3,756	46.28	
Conservative win (new boundaries)				
Labour win (new boundaries)				

== 2002–2014 Tower Hamlets council elections ==
St Katharine's and Wapping ward boundaries from 2002 to 2014

There was a revision of ward boundaries in Tower Hamlets in 2002.

=== 2010 election ===
The election on 6 May 2010 took place on the same day as the United Kingdom general election.

2010 Tower Hamlets London Borough Council election: St Katharine's and Wapping (3)
Party	Candidate	Votes	%	±%
Conservative	Emma Jones	1,623		
Labour	Shafiqul Haque	1,455		
Labour	Denise Jones	1,447		
Conservative	Neil King	1414		
Conservative	Paul Mawdsley	1383		
Labour	Michael Keith	1330		
Liberal Democrats	Geoffrey Juden	732		
Respect	Muhammad Chowdhury	491		
Liberal Democrats	Quadri Mamun	454		
Respect	Muhammad Islam	453		
Liberal Democrats	Elvyra Sadiene	445		
Respect	Dilwara Ali	418		
Green	Martine Hall	395		
Green	John Foster	388		
Green	Alana Jelinek	247		
Turnout			62.52	
Conservative hold		Swing		
Labour hold		Swing		
Labour hold		Swing		

=== 2006 election ===
The election took place on 4 May 2006.

2006 Tower Hamlets London Borough Council election: St Katharine's and Wapping (3)
Party	Candidate	Votes	%	±%
Conservative	Emma Jones	1,351	39.9	
Labour	Shafiqul Haque	1,321	39.0	
Labour	Denise Jones	1,290		
Labour	Richard Brooks	1,231		
Conservative	Neil King	1,223		
Conservative	Paul Mawdsley	1,153		
Green	Martine Hall	364	10.8	
Green	Andrew Hall	359		
Liberal Democrats	Margaret Man	349	10.3	
Liberal Democrats	Ron Coverson	321		
Liberal Democrats	Alan Mead	305		
Turnout			35.5	
Conservative gain from Labour		Swing		
Labour hold		Swing		
Labour hold		Swing		

=== 2002 election ===
The election took place on 2 May 2002.

2002 Tower Hamlets London Borough Council election: St Katharine's and Wapping (3)
Party	Candidate	Votes	%	±%
Labour	Denise Jones	1,082		
Labour	Shafiqul Haque	1,049		
Labour	Richard Brooks	1,034		
Conservative	Kevin Noles	842		
Conservative	William Norton	766		
Conservative	Toby Vintcent	733		
Liberal Democrats	Mohammed Ahmed	470		
Liberal Democrats	Marian Elsden	345		
Liberal Democrats	Alexandra Sugden	318		
New Britain Party	Dennis Delderfield	259		
New Britain Party	John Divito	211		
Turnout		7,109		
Labour win (new seat)				
Labour win (new seat)				
Labour win (new seat)				
