= Spitalfields and Banglatown =

Electoral ward in the London Borough of Tower Hamlets, UK

- Electoral ward for the Tower Hamlets London Borough Council
- Spitalfields and Banglatown ward boundaries since 2014
- Borough: Tower Hamlets
- County: Greater London
- Population: 13,340 (2021)
- Electorate: 9,032 (2022)
- Area: 0.9088 square kilometres (0.3509 sq mi)

Current electoral ward
- Created: 1964
- Councillors: 1964-1978: 4; 1978-2014: 3; 2014–present: 2
- ONS code: 00BGGL (2002–2014)
- GSS code: E05000587 (2002–2014); E05009333 (2014–present)

Spitalfields and Banglatown is an electoral ward in the London Borough of Tower Hamlets. The ward was first used in the 1964 elections and between that election and the 2002 elections it was named Spitalfields. It returns 2 councillors to Tower Hamlets London Borough Council.

== Tower Hamlets council elections since 2014 ==
There was a revision of ward boundaries in Tower Hamlets in 2014.

=== 2022 election ===
The election took place on 5 May 2022.

2022 Tower Hamlets London Borough Council election: Spitalfields and Banglatown (2)
| Party | Candidate | Votes | % | ±% |
|---|---|---|---|---|
| Aspire | Kabir Hussain | 1,595 | 42.66 | +19.82 |
| Aspire | Suluk Ahmed | 1,591 | 42.55 | +19.44 |
| Labour | Shad Chowdhury | 1,545 | 41.32 | −8.84 |
| Labour | Nazma Hussain | 1,128 | 30.17 | −2.62 |
| Green | Abdul Hye | 293 | 7.84 | +0.01 |
| Liberal Democrats | Freda Graf | 242 | 6.47 | +0.61 |
| Conservative | Timothy Lowe | 173 | 4.63 | −3.49 |
| Liberal Democrats | Gareth Shelton | 172 | 4.60 | −0.99 |
| Conservative | Shamim Miah | 94 | 2.51 | −3.82 |
| Rejected ballots | | 49 | | |
| Turnout | | 3,739 | 41.40 | +1.16 |
| Registered electors | | 9,032 | | |
| Aspire gain from Labour | | Swing | | |
| Aspire gain from Labour | | Swing | | |

=== 2018 election ===
The election took place on 3 May 2018.

2018 Tower Hamlets London Borough Council election: Spitalfields and Banglatown (2)
| Party | Candidate | Votes | % | ±% |
|---|---|---|---|---|
| Labour | Shad Chowdury | 1,704 | 50.16 | +19.97 |
| Labour | Leema Qureshi | 1,114 | 32.79 | +7.57 |
| Aspire | Suluk Ahmed | 785 | 23.11 | −20.21 |
| Aspire | Kalam Choudhury | 776 | 22.84 | N/A |
| Conservative | Anwara Ali | 276 | 8.12 | −0.55 |
| Green | Maureen Childs | 266 | 7.83 | −4.22 |
| PATH | Abdul Rob | 263 | 7.74 | N/A |
| Conservative | William Fletcher | 215 | 6.33 | −0.11 |
| Green | Oli Walker | 201 | 5.92 | N/A |
| Liberal Democrats | Linda Packard | 199 | 5.86 | N/A |
| Liberal Democrats | Ferdy North | 190 | 5.59 | +0.15 |
| PATH | Sumsul Talukder | 145 | 4.27 | N/A |
| Rejected ballots | | 49 | | |
| Turnout | | 3,446 | 40.24 | |
| Registered electors | | 8,563 | | |
| Labour gain from Tower Hamlets First | | Swing | | |
| Labour gain from Tower Hamlets First | | Swing | | |

=== 2014 election ===
The election took place on 22 May 2014.

2014 Tower Hamlets London Borough Council election: Spitalfields and Banglatown (2)
| Party | Candidate | Votes | % | ±% |
|---|---|---|---|---|
| Tower Hamlets First | Gulam Robbani | 1,955 | 48.58 | |
| Tower Hamlets First | Suluk Ahmed | 1,743 | 43.32 | |
| Labour | Helal Abbas | 1,215 | 30.19 | |
| Labour | Tarik Khan | 1,015 | 25.22 | |
| Green | Zachary Thornton | 485 | 12.05 | |
| Conservative | Jane Emmerson | 349 | 8.67 | |
| Conservative | David Fell | 259 | 6.44 | |
| Liberal Democrats | Ferdy North | 219 | 5.44 | |
| TUSC | Jason Turvey | 98 | 2.44 | |
| Turnout | | 4,070 | 43.69 | |
| Tower Hamlets First win (new boundaries) | | | | |
| Tower Hamlets First win (new boundaries) | | | | |

== 2002–2014 Tower Hamlets council elections ==
Spitalfields and Banglatown ward boundaries from 2002 to 2014

There was a revision of ward boundaries in Tower Hamlets in 2002.

=== 2010 election ===
The election on 6 May 2010 took place on the same day as the United Kingdom general election.

2010 Tower Hamlets London Borough Council election: Spitalfields and Banglatown (3)
| Party | Candidate | Votes | % | ±% |
|---|---|---|---|---|
| Labour | Lutfur Rahman | 1,660 | | |
| Labour | Shelina Akhtar | 1,545 | | |
| Labour | Helal Abbas | 1,500 | | |
| Respect | Fozol Miah | 1068 | | |
| Liberal Democrats | Ben Dyer | 839 | | |
| Liberal Democrats | Moniruzzaman Syed | 673 | | |
| Conservative | Philip Vracas | 571 | | |
| Conservative | Sadek Khan | 561 | | |
| Liberal Democrats | Jewel Toropdar | 532 | | |
| Conservative | Asad Ahmod | 492 | | |
| Green | Nico Aspinall | 483 | | |
| Respect | Ahad Ali | 441 | | |
| Respect | Alibaba Prasad | 437 | | |
| Green | Mohammed Hossain | 265 | | |
| Independent | Shah Yousuf | 141 | | |
| Turnout | | | 56.48 | |
| Labour hold | | Swing | | |
| Labour hold | | Swing | | |
| Labour gain from Respect | | Swing | | |

=== 2006 election ===
The election took place on 4 May 2006.

2006 Tower Hamlets London Borough Council election: Spitalfields and Banglatown (3)
| Party | Candidate | Votes | % | ±% |
|---|---|---|---|---|
| Labour | Helal Abbas | 912 | 24.4 | |
| Respect | Fozol Miah | 866 | 23.1 | |
| Labour | Lutfur Rahman | 860 | | |
| Labour | Mohammad Mortuza | 775 | | |
| Independent | Mizanur Chaudhury | 716 | 19.1 | |
| Respect | Mohammad Islam | 682 | | |
| Liberal Democrats | Mohammed Kamali | 548 | 14.6 | |
| Respect | Mohammed Choudhury | 471 | | |
| Conservative | Dinul Shah | 458 | 12.2 | |
| Liberal Democrats | Mohammed Rahman | 424 | | |
| Liberal Democrats | Guy Burton | 354 | | |
| Conservative | Iqbal Hussain | 329 | | |
| Green | Beth Collar | 242 | 6.5 | |
| Conservative | Hamid-Ur Chowdhury | 241 | | |
| Green | Peter Lockley | 191 | | |
| Turnout | | | 43.8 | |
| Labour hold | | Swing | | |
| Respect gain from Labour | | Swing | | |
| Labour hold | | Swing | | |

=== 2002 election ===
The election took place on 2 May 2002.

2002 Tower Hamlets London Borough Council election: Spitalfields and Banglatown (3)
| Party | Candidate | Votes | % | ±% |
|---|---|---|---|---|
| Labour | Helal Abbas | 936 | | |
| Labour | Ghulam Mortuza | 848 | | |
| Labour | Lutfur Rahman | 846 | | |
| Conservative | Mohammed Rahman | 400 | | |
| Conservative | Pir Quium | 345 | | |
| Conservative | David Webb | 272 | | |
| Liberal Democrats | Ahmed Hussain | 255 | | |
| Green | Keith Magnum | 198 | | |
| Liberal Democrats | Melvin Ramsay | 198 | | |
| Liberal Democrats | Alas Uddin | 186 | | |
| Independent | Muhit Ahmed | 157 | | |
| Green | Annika Sanders | 146 | | |
| Independent | Ismail Malik | 137 | | |
| Green | Kerry Seager | 130 | | |
| Independent | Alexander Vracas | 124 | | |
| Independent | Sultan Ahmed | 53 | | |
| Turnout | | 5,231 | | |
| Labour win (new seat) | | | | |
| Labour win (new seat) | | | | |
| Labour win (new seat) | | | | |
