= Whitechapel (ward) =

- Electoral ward for the Tower Hamlets London Borough Council
- Whitechapel ward boundaries since 2014
- Borough: Tower Hamlets
- County: Greater London
- Population: 18,841 (2021)
- Electorate: 11,898 (2022)
- Area: 0.9437 square kilometres (0.3644 sq mi)

Current electoral ward
- Created: 2002
- Councillors: 3
- ONS code: 00BGGN (2002–2014)
- GSS code: E05000589 (2002–2014); E05009336 (2014–present)

Whitechapel is an electoral ward in the London Borough of Tower Hamlets. The ward was first used in the 2002 elections. It returns councillors to Tower Hamlets London Borough Council.

== Tower Hamlets council elections since 2014 ==
There was a revision of ward boundaries in Tower Hamlets in 2014.

=== 2022 election ===
The election took place on 5 May 2022.

2022 Tower Hamlets London Borough Council election: Whitechapel (3)
Party	Candidate	Votes	%	±%
Aspire	Shafi Ahmed	1,954	41.63	+11.72
Labour	Faroque Ahmed	1,663	35.43	−7.75
Aspire	Kamrul Hussain	1,594	33.96	+7.08
Labour	Amina Ali	1,510	32.17	−0.05
Labour	Shah Ameen	1,468	31.27	−9.13
Liberal Democrats	Aminur Khan	657	14.00	−12.88
Resurrection Young People. In Sha Allah	Shahed Ali	611	13.02	N/A
Liberal Democrats	Muhammad Abul Asad	586	12.48	−13.12
Liberal Democrats	Michael Robinson	569	12.12	+3.23
Green	Samuel Roberts	505	10.76	+0.89
Green	Shahrar Ali	352	7.50	−0.22
Conservative	Michael Dormer	273	5.82	−1.62
Conservative	Nikola Suica	204	4.35	−2.18
Conservative	Mustafa Khan	153	3.26	−2.51
Rejected ballots		42		
Turnout		4,694	39.45	+0.69
Registered electors		13,292		
Aspire gain from Labour		Swing		
Labour hold		Swing		
Aspire gain from Labour		Swing		

=== 2018 election ===
The election took place on 3 May 2018.

2018 Tower Hamlets London Borough Council election: Whitechapel (3)
Party	Candidate	Votes	%	±%
Labour	Faroque Ahmed	1,812	43.18	+14.58
Labour	Shah Ameen	1,695	40.40	+15.36
Labour	Victoria Obaze	1,352	32.22	+7.22
PATH	Shafi Ahmed	1,255	29.91	−15.10
PATH	Aminur Khan	1,128	26.88	−17.06
PATH	Muhammad Asad	1,074	25.60	−18.95
Green	Katy Clarke	414	9.87	−4.92
Liberal Democrats	Nicola East	373	8.89	+1.36
Aspire	Syed Ali	341	8.13	N/A
Green	Miles Battye	324	7.72	N/A
Conservative	Jane Emmerson	312	7.44	−1.17
Aspire	Syeda Eshrat Queen	281	6.70	N/A
Conservative	Mark Fletcher	274	6.53	−1.99
Liberal Democrats	Emanuel Andjelic	255	6.08	N/A
Aspire	Dipu Jaigirdar	253	6.03	N/A
Conservative	Noel Dube	242	5.77	−1.49
Liberal Democrats	Stilpon Nestor	237	5.65	N/A
Rejected ballots		49		
Turnout		4,245	38.76	
Registered electors		10,953		
Labour gain from Tower Hamlets First		Swing		
Labour gain from Tower Hamlets First		Swing		
Labour gain from Tower Hamlets First		Swing		

=== 2014 election ===
The election took place on 22 May 2014.

2014 Tower Hamlets London Borough Council election: Whitechapel (3)
Party	Candidate	Votes	%	±%
Tower Hamlets First	Shahed Ali	2,139	45.01	
Tower Hamlets First	Abdul Asad	2,117	44.55	
Tower Hamlets First	Aminur Khan	2,088	43.94	
Labour	Faruque Ahmed	1,359	28.60	
Labour	Robert Robinson	1,190	25.04	
Labour	Jamalur Rahman	1,188	25.00	
Green	Maggie Crosbie	703	14.79	
Conservative	Richard Holden	409	8.61	
Conservative	Dinah Glover	405	8.52	
Liberal Democrats	John Griffiths	358	7.53	
Conservative	Nicholas Vandyce	345	7.26	
UKIP	Andrew McNeilis	199	4.19	
TUSC	Michael Wrack	139	2.93	
Turnout		4,804	42.37	
Tower Hamlets First win (new seat)				
Tower Hamlets First win (new seat)				
Tower Hamlets First win (new seat)				

== 2002–2014 Tower Hamlets council elections ==
Whitechapel ward boundaries from 2002 to 2014

There was a revision of ward boundaries in Tower Hamlets in 2002.

=== 2010 election ===
The election on 6 May 2010 took place on the same day as the United Kingdom general election.

2010 Tower Hamlets London Borough Council election: Whitechapel (3)
Party	Candidate	Votes	%	±%
Labour	Shahed Ali	2,158		
Labour	Aminur Khan	2,091		
Labour	Abdul Asad	2,003		
Liberal Democrats	Saleh Ahmed	1,119		
Respect	Lutfur Rahman	1,114		
Liberal Democrats	Kamal Ali	1,069		
Conservative	Ahad Abdul	1,044		
Respect	Abdulla Almamun	1,004		
Conservative	Fanu Mia	915		
Liberal Democrats	Shamim Rahman	906		
Respect	Saidul Alom	890		
Conservative	David Fell	832		
Green	Richard Leyland	599		
Green	Raymond Waring	383		
Green	Mohammed Uddin	335		
Turnout			58.30	
Labour hold		Swing		
Labour hold		Swing		
Labour hold		Swing		

=== 2006 election ===
The election took place on 4 May 2006.

2006 Tower Hamlets London Borough Council election: Whitechapel (3)
Party	Candidate	Votes	%	±%
Respect	Shahed Ali	1,449	35.1	
Labour	Abdul Asad	1,107	26.8	
Respect	Waiseul Islam	1,084		
Labour	Lutfur Rahman	1,040		
Labour	Doros Ullah	1,019		
Respect	Farhana Zaman	1,004		
Independent	Fanu Miah	650	15.7	
Liberal Democrats	Mohammed Haydar	529	12.8	
Liberal Democrats	Kate Grieve	511		
Liberal Democrats	Shamsuddin Ahmed	458		
Conservative	Muhammed Ahmed	397	9.6	
Conservative	Moya Frawley	344		
Conservative	Shah Suhel	284		
Independent	Mohammed Goni	186		
Turnout			39.9	
Respect gain from Labour		Swing		
Labour hold		Swing		
Respect gain from Labour		Swing		

=== 2002 election ===
The election took place on 2 May 2002.

2002 Tower Hamlets London Borough Council election: Whitechapel (3)
Party	Candidate	Votes	%	±%
Labour	Abdul Asad	1,263		
Labour	Fanu Miah	1,142		
Labour	Doros Ullah	1,125		
Conservative	Mostafa Miah	592		
Conservative	Shafique Miah	475		
Conservative	Monsur Ahmed	466		
Independent	Mohamed Ahmed	462		
Independent	Shamsuddin Ahmed	451		
Independent	Anu Miah	407		
Liberal Democrats	Deborah O'Flaherty	212		
Green	Jacqueline Goodman	205		
Green	Brendon O'Connor	200		
Liberal Democrats	Sajaul Karim	174		
Green	Melina La Firenze	167		
Liberal Democrats	Gulam Hossain	162		
Socialist Alliance	Philip Billows	85		
Turnout		7,588		
Labour win (new seat)				
Labour win (new seat)				
Labour win (new seat)				
