= Bow (ward) =

- Former electoral ward for the Tower Hamlets London Borough Council
- Bow ward boundaries from 1978 to 1994
- Borough: Tower Hamlets
- County: Greater London

Former electoral ward
- Created: 1978
- Abolished: 2002
- Councillors: 3

Bow was an electoral ward in the London Borough of Tower Hamlets. The ward was first used in the 1978 elections and last used for the 1998 elections. It returned councillors to Tower Hamlets London Borough Council.

== Tower Hamlets council elections ==
There was a change to the ward boundaries in 1994 when the Tower Hamlets/Newham boundary was realigned.

=== 1998 election ===
The election took place on 7 May 1998.

1998 Tower Hamlets London Borough Council election: Bow (3)
Party	Candidate	Votes	%	±%
Liberal Democrats	Raymon Gipson	1,138		
Liberal Democrats	Terry Stacy	1,063		
Liberal Democrats	Marian Williams	1,010		
Labour	Arthur Downes	797		
Labour	Arun Chattopadhyay	793		
Labour	Benjamin Leapman	696		
Conservative	Tafique Chowdhury	246		
Conservative	Simon Gordon-Clark	138		
Turnout		5,881		
Liberal Democrats hold		Swing		
Liberal Democrats hold		Swing		
Liberal Democrats hold		Swing		

=== 1994 election ===
The election took place on 5 May 1994.

1994 Tower Hamlets London Borough Council election: Bow (3)
Party	Candidate	Votes	%	±%
Liberal Democrats	Patricia Catchpole	1,308		
Liberal Democrats	Raymond Gipson	1,258		
Liberal Democrats	Patricia Webb	1,187		
Labour	B.G. Richmond	962		
Labour	J.A.C. Sterne	935		
Labour	W.E. Wakefield	918		
Conservative	Simon Gordon-Clark	176		
Conservative	R.D. Mitchell	131		
Conservative	J.F.L. Phibbs	130		
Turnout		6,126	43.9	
Liberal Democrats hold		Swing		
Liberal Democrats hold		Swing		
Liberal Democrats hold		Swing		

=== 1990 election ===
The election took place on 3 May 1990.

1990 Tower Hamlets London Borough Council election: Bow (3)
Party	Candidate	Votes	%	±%
Liberal Democrats	Patricia Catchpole	1,548	64.3	
Liberal Democrats	Ronald Lebar	1,497		
Liberal Democrats	Patricia Webb	1,451		
Labour	Belle Harris	860	35.7	
Labour	Rory Moore	805		
Labour	Benard Richmond	776		
Majority			28.6	
Turnout		6,128	41.3	
Liberal Democrats hold		Swing		
Liberal Democrats hold		Swing		
Liberal Democrats hold		Swing		

=== 1986 election ===
The election took place on 8 May 1986.

1986 Tower Hamlets London Borough Council election: Bow (3)
Party	Candidate	Votes	%	±%
Liberal	Patricia Catchpole	1,198		
Liberal	Ronald Lebar	1,165		
Liberal	Anthony Wilcock	1,071		
Labour	Edward Caunter	795		
Labour	Wendy Allman	777		
Labour	Thomas Redmond	737		
Conservative	Bernard Jenkin	172		
Majority				
Turnout		6,278	34.6	
Liberal hold		Swing		
Liberal hold		Swing		
Liberal hold		Swing		

=== 1982 election ===
The election took place on 6 May 1982.

1982 Tower Hamlets London Borough Council election: Bow (3)
Party	Candidate	Votes	%	±%
Liberal	Ronald Lebar	1,004	58.3	
Liberal	Patricia L Catchpole	980		
Liberal	Jonathan Price	924		
Labour	Hilary J Price	661	39.0	
Labour	Patricia E Rackley	659		
Labour	Leonard Coan	626		
Conservative		138	2.8	
Majority				
Turnout				
Liberal hold		Swing		
Liberal hold		Swing		
Liberal hold		Swing		

=== 1978 election ===
The election took place on 4 May 1978.

1978 Tower Hamlets London Borough Council election: Bow (3)
Party	Candidate	Votes	%	±%
Liberal	Peter Gray	656		
Liberal	Ronald Lebar	635		
Liberal	Gwendoline Lee	632		
Labour	Thomas Crudgington	560		
Labour	Hetty Hawksbee	553		
Labour	Deirdre Wood	525		
Conservative	John Livingstone	129		
Conservative	Linda Archibald	111		
Conservative	Tania Mason	108		
National Front	Richard Cribb	99		
National Front	Albert Buttery	98		
National Front	Ernest Bale	88		
Majority				
Turnout		4,568	33.7	
Liberal win (new seat)				
Liberal win (new seat)				
Liberal win (new seat)				
