= St Peter's (1978 Tower Hamlets ward) =

- Former electoral ward for the Tower Hamlets London Borough Council
- St Peter's ward boundaries
- Borough: Tower Hamlets
- County: Greater London

Former electoral ward
- Created: 1978
- Abolished: 2002
- Councillors: 3

St Peter's was an electoral ward in the London Borough of Tower Hamlets. The ward was first used in the 1978 elections and last used for the 1998 elections. It returned three councillors to Tower Hamlets London Borough Council.

== 1998 election ==
The election took place on 7 May 1998.

1998 Tower Hamlets London Borough Council election: St Peter's
Party	Candidate	Votes	%	±%
Labour	Jusna Begum	1,405		
Labour	Raja Miah	1,223		
Labour	Raymond Marney	1,218		
Liberal Democrats	Mohammed Chowdhury	802		
Liberal	Kathleen Cook	798		
Liberal	Brian Lafferty	590		
Liberal	Betty Wright	586		
Liberal Democrats	Timothy O'Flaherty	460		
Liberal Democrats	Michael Elston	441		
Conservative	Jay Tarbey	237		
Turnout		7,760		
Labour hold		Swing		
Labour hold		Swing		
Labour hold		Swing		

== 1994 election ==
The election took place on 5 May 1994.

1994 Tower Hamlets London Borough Council election: St Peter's
Party	Candidate	Votes	%	±%
Labour	Philip Maxwell	2,092	44.85	▲10.88
Labour	Ala Uddin	2,010		
Labour	Raymond Marney	1,967		
Ind. Lib Dem	Anne Ambrose	893	19.00	New
BNP	Paul Maxwell	889	19.71	New
Ind. Lib Dem	Kathleen Caulfield	876		
Ind. Lib Dem	Betty Wright	803		
Liberal Democrats	Syed Islam	627	13.23	▼44.47
Liberal Democrats	Michael Patton	567		
Conservative	Jane Emmerson	161	3.21	New
Conservative	Charles Southcombe	128		
Registered electors		8,110		▲770
Turnout		4,306	53.09	▲4.83
Rejected ballots		13	0.30	▼0.48
Labour hold				
Labour gain from Liberal Democrats				
Labour gain from Ind. Lib Dem				

== 1990 by-election ==
The by-election took place on 30 August 1990, following the death of Brenda Collins.

1990 St Peter's by-election
Party	Candidate	Votes	%	±%
Labour	Suzanne Sullivan	1,030	45.3	
Liberal Democrats	Terence Cowley	915	40.3	
BNP	Kenneth Walsh	275	12.1	
Conservative	Sarah-Jane Quinlan	53	2.3	
Majority		115	5.0	
Turnout		7,375	30.8	
Labour gain from Liberal Democrats		Swing		

== 1990 election ==
The election took place on 3 May 1990.

1990 Tower Hamlets London Borough Council election: St Peter's
Party	Candidate	Votes	%	±%
Lib Dem Focus Team	Brenda Collins	2,089	57.70	
Lib Dem Focus Team	Abdul Rohim	1,981		
Lib Dem Focus Team	Betty Wright	1,933		
Labour	Fanu Miah	1,232	33.97	
Labour	Amanda Owen	1,202		
Labour	Terence Penton	1,101		
Green	Harvey Gilbert	289	8.33	
Registered electors		7,340		
Turnout		3542	48.26	
Rejected ballots		17	0.48	
Lib Dem Focus Team hold		Swing		
Lib Dem Focus Team hold		Swing		
Lib Dem Focus Team hold		Swing		

== 1986 election ==
The election took place on 8 May 1986.

1986 Tower Hamlets London Borough Council election: St Peter's
Party	Candidate	Votes	%	±%
Liberal	Brenda Collins	1,324		
Liberal	Patrick Streeter	1,316		
Liberal	Andrew Goodchild	1,291		
Labour	Maureen Caldon	904		
Labour	Rosemary Maher	871		
Labour	Joseph Ramanoop	838		
Conservative	Amanda Drury	171		
Conservative	Nicholas Greenfield	143		
Majority				
Turnout		7,525	33.9	
Liberal hold		Swing		
Liberal hold		Swing		
Liberal hold		Swing		

== 1984 by-election ==
The by-election took place on 19 July 1984, following the resignation of Dennis Hallam.

1984 St Peter's by-election
Party	Candidate	Votes	%	±%
Liberal	Josie Curran	1,324		
Labour	Albert Jacob	779		
National Front	Raymond Bradford	97		
Conservative	Robert J. Ingram	73		
Majority		545		
Turnout		7,306	31.2	
Liberal hold		Swing		

== 1982 election ==
The election took place on 6 May 1982.

1982 Tower Hamlets London Borough Council election: St Peter's
Party	Candidate	Votes	%	±%
Liberal	Andrew Goodchild	1,726		
Liberal	Dennis Hallam	1,699		
Liberal	Patrick Streeter	1,690		
Labour	Albert Jacob	721		
Labour	Beatrice Orwell	700		
Labour	Edwin Walker	650		
National Front	Victor Clark	121		
National Front	Albert Mariner	92		
National Front	Susan Clapp	88		
Majority				
Turnout				
Liberal gain from Labour		Swing		
Liberal gain from Labour		Swing		
Liberal gain from Labour		Swing		

== 1978 election ==
The election took place on 4 May 1978.

1978 Tower Hamlets London Borough Council election: St Peter's
Party	Candidate	Votes	%	±%
Labour	Albert Jacob	1,109		
Labour	Beatrice Orwell	1,063		
Labour	Edwin Walker	1,050		
Conservative	Patrick Holmes	431		
National Front	Albert Mariner	401		
National Front	George Newman	376		
Communist	Hugh McAlpine	121		
Majority				
Turnout		7,809	25.3	
Labour win (new seat)				
Labour win (new seat)				
Labour win (new seat)				
