= Holy Trinity (Tower Hamlets ward) =

- Former electoral ward for the Tower Hamlets London Borough Council
- Holy Trinity ward boundaries from 1978 to 2002
- Borough: Tower Hamlets
- County: Greater London
- Electorate: 7,483 (1998)
- Major settlements: Mile End

Former electoral ward
- Created: 1965
- Abolished: 2002
- Councillors: 3
- Replaced by: Bethnal Green South, Mile End and Globe Town

Holy Trinity was an electoral ward in the London Borough of Tower Hamlets from 1965 to 2002. The ward was first used in the 1964 elections and last used for the 1998 elections, with a final by-election in 2001. It returned three councillors to Tower Hamlets London Borough Council. It was named after the former church of Holy Trinity, Mile End.

== List of councillors ==
Term	Councillor	Party
1964–1970	J. Olley	Labour
1964–1982	Joseph O'Connor	Labour
1964–1968	E. Moonman	Labour
1968–1982	George Wall	Labour
1970–1974	I. McDougall	Labour
1974–1982	George Negus	Labour
1982–1982	Stephen Charters	Liberal
1982–1986	Jennifer Hearn	Liberal
1982–1986	Jeanette Smallwood	Liberal
1986–1990	Belinda Knowles	Liberal
1986–1994	John Nudds	Liberal
1990–1994	Jonathon Stokes	Liberal Democrats
1990–1994	Akikur Rahman	Liberal Democrats
1994–1998	Nooruddin Ahmed	Labour
1994–1998	Linda Gregory	Labour
1994–1998	Joseph Ramanoop	Labour
1998–2001	Albert Snooks	Liberal Democrats
1998–2002	Barrie Duffey	Liberal Democrats
1998–2002	Salim Ullah	Labour
2001–2002	Sirajul Islam	Labour

== Summary ==
Councillors elected by party at each general borough election.

- Labour
- Liberal
- Liberal Democrats

== 1978–2002 Tower Hamlets council elections ==
There was a revision of ward boundaries in Tower Hamlets in 1978.

=== 2001 by-election ===
The by-election took place on 28 June 2001, following the death of Albert Snooks.

2001 Holy Trinity by-election
Party	Candidate	Votes	%	±%
Labour	Sirajul Islam	1,081	53.5	+11.5
Liberal Democrats	Rosina Tucker	817	40.5	−2.9
BNP	Lynda Miller	74	3.7	−1.0
Socialist Alliance	Pauline Kempster	47	2.3	+2.3
Majority		264	13.0	
Turnout		2,019	27.1	
Labour gain from Liberal Democrats		Swing		

=== 1998 election ===
The election on 7 May 1998 took place on the same day as the 1998 Greater London Authority referendum.

1998 Tower Hamlets London Borough Council election: Holy Trinity
Party	Candidate	Votes	%	±%
Liberal Democrats	Albert Snooks	1,358	44.11	▲20.34
Liberal Democrats	Barrie Duffey	1,342		
Labour	Salim Ullah	1,314	40.56	▲5.52
Liberal Democrats	Rosina Tucker	1,270		
Labour	Judith Gardiner			
Labour	Anthony Sharpe	1,156		
Conservative	Mustak Syed	313	10.43	New
BNP	Paul Costello	147	4.90	▼14.58
Registered electors		7,483		▼1,216
Turnout		2,992	39.98	▼18.28
Rejected ballots		21	0.70	▲0.40
Liberal Democrats gain from Labour				
Liberal Democrats gain from Labour				
Labour hold				

=== 1994 election ===
The election took place on 5 May 1994.

1994 Tower Hamlets London Borough Council election: Holy Trinity
Party	Candidate	Votes	%	±%
Labour	Nooruddin Ahmed	1,407	34.94	▲6.03
Labour	Linda Gregory	1,398		
Labour	Joseph Ramanoop	1,258		
Liberal Democrats	Nicola Gale	1,039	23.77	▼31.94
Liberal Democrats	Jonathon Stokes	1,002		
BNP	David King	786	19.48	▲10.77
BNP	Lynda Miller	743		
BNP	Edward McHale	737		
Liberal Democrats	Akikur Rahman	722		
Ind. Lib Dem	John Nudds	680	17.55	New
Green	Richard Klein	165	4.26	▼2.41
Registered electors		6,267		
Turnout		3,651	58.26	
Rejected ballots		11	0.30	
Labour gain from Liberal Democrats		Swing		
Labour gain from Liberal Democrats		Swing		
Labour gain from Liberal Democrats		Swing		

=== 1990 election ===
The election took place on 3 May 1990.

1990 Tower Hamlets London Borough Council election: Holy Trinity
Party	Candidate	Votes	%	±%
Liberal Democrats	John Nudds	1,965	55.71	
Liberal Democrats	Jonathon Stokes	1,909		
Liberal Democrats	Akikur Rahman	1,688		
Labour	Edward Caunter	975	28.91	
Labour	Sunahwar Ali	958		
Labour	Rosemary Maher	954		
BNP	Stephen Smith	290	8.71	
Green	Christine Law	222	6.67	
Registered electors		6,613		
Turnout		3302	49.93	
Rejected ballots		14	0.42	
Liberal Democrats hold		Swing		
Liberal Democrats hold		Swing		
Liberal Democrats hold		Swing		

=== 1986 by-election ===
The by-election took place on 3 July 1986, following the resignation of Belinda Knowles. Knowles was found to have been ineligible to stand in the 1986 borough general election due to not meeting the age requirement at the time of nomination. Knowles had become old enough to stand at the subsequent by-election.

1986 Holy Trinity by-election
Party	Candidate	Votes	%	±%
Liberal	Belinda Knowles	1,642		
Labour	Michael Chalkey	957		
National Front	Roger Evans	138		
Conservative	Paul Ingham	22		
Majority		685		
Turnout		6,851	40.6	
Liberal hold		Swing		

=== 1986 election ===
The election took place on 8 May 1986.

1986 Tower Hamlets London Borough Council election: Holy Trinity
Party	Candidate	Votes	%	±%
Liberal	Stephen Charters	1,526		
Liberal	Belinda Knowles	1,445		
Liberal	John Nudds	1,351		
Labour	Michael Chalkley	1,225		
Labour	Geoffrey Cade	1,167		
Labour	Salim Ullah	1,025		
BNP	David Ettridge	212		
Conservative	Anthony Norton	138		
Conservative	Anne-Marie Pedlingham	105		
Majority				
Turnout		6,836	44.7	
Liberal hold		Swing		
Liberal hold		Swing		
Liberal hold		Swing		

=== 1982 election ===
The election took place on 6 May 1982.

1982 Tower Hamlets London Borough Council election: Holy Trinity
Party	Candidate	Votes	%	±%
Liberal	Stephen Charters	1,434		
Liberal	Jennifer Hearn	1,427		
Liberal	Jeanette Smallwood	1,397		
Labour	Albert Snooks	912		
Labour	Terence McCarthy	876		
Labour	Joseph O'Connor	810		
Conservative	Barbara Perrott	118		
Majority				
Turnout				
Liberal gain from Labour		Swing		
Liberal gain from Labour		Swing		
Liberal gain from Labour		Swing		

=== 1978 election ===
The election took place on 4 May 1978.

1978 Tower Hamlets London Borough Council election: Holy Trinity
Party	Candidate	Votes	%	±%
Labour	Joseph O'Connor	1,051		
Labour	George Negus	1,036		
Labour	George Wall	974		
Conservative	Barbara Perrott	351		
Conservative	William McCrossan	336		
National Front	Irene Underwood	254		
National Front	Michael Rowe	230		
National Front	George Williams	207		
Majority				
Turnout		6,819	25.8	
Labour win (new boundaries)				
Labour win (new boundaries)				
Labour win (new boundaries)				

== 1964–1978 Tower Hamlets council election ==
External image
- Map showing Holy Trinity ward boundaries from 1965 to 1978

=== 1974 election ===
The election took place on 2 May 1974.

1974 Tower Hamlets London Borough Council election: Holy Trinity
Party	Candidate	Votes	%	±%
Labour	Joseph O'Connor	887		
Labour	George Negus	854		
Labour	George Wall	828		
Liberal	E. Flounders	427		
Liberal	J. Maitland	410		
Majority				
Turnout		6,845	20.2	
Labour hold		Swing		
Labour hold		Swing		
Labour hold		Swing		

=== 1971 election ===
The election took place on 13 May 1971.

1971 Tower Hamlets London Borough Council election: Holy Trinity
Party	Candidate	Votes	%	±%
Labour	Joseph O'Connor	1,367		
Labour	I. McDougall	1,363		
Labour	George Wall	1,283		
Communist	D. Lyons	207		
Turnout				
Labour hold		Swing		
Labour hold		Swing		
Labour hold		Swing		

=== 1970 by-election ===
The by-election took place on 24 September 1970.

1970 Holy Trinity by-election
Party	Candidate	Votes	%	±%
Labour	I. McDougall	667		
Communist	D. Lyons	127		
Conservative	A. Heller	64		
Majority		540		
Turnout			11.1	
Labour hold		Swing		

=== 1968 election ===
The election took place on 9 May 1968.

1968 Tower Hamlets London Borough Council election: Holy Trinity
Party	Candidate	Votes	%	±%
Labour	Joseph O'Connor	617		
Labour	J. Olley	609		
Labour	George Wall	553		
Communist	D. Lyons	151		
Majority				
Turnout		7,530	10.5	
Labour hold		Swing		
Labour hold		Swing		
Labour hold		Swing		

=== 1964 election ===
The election took place on 7 May 1964.

1964 Tower Hamlets London Borough Council election: Holy Trinity
Party	Candidate	Votes	%	±%
Labour	J. Olley	992		
Labour	Joseph O'Connor	977		
Labour	E. Moonman	964		
Conservative	A. Lyons	159		
Liberal	L. Woolfovitch	159		
Conservative	F. Eldridge	133		
Conservative	C. Krimmel	118		
Turnout		1,288	16.1	
Labour win (new seat)				
Labour win (new seat)				
Labour win (new seat)				
