= Park (Tower Hamlets ward) =

- Former electoral ward for the Tower Hamlets London Borough Council
- Park ward boundaries from 1978 to 1994
- Borough: Tower Hamlets
- County: Greater London
- Electorate: 4,067 (1998)

Former electoral ward
- Created: 1978
- Abolished: 2002
- Councillors: 2

Park was an electoral ward in the London Borough of Tower Hamlets. The ward was first used in the 1978 elections and last used for the 1998 elections. It returned councillors to Tower Hamlets London Borough Council.

== Tower Hamlets council elections ==
There was a significant change to the ward boundaries in 1994 when Victoria Park was brought fully into Tower Hamlets, however as this area was unpopulated it made no change to the electorate.

=== 1998 election ===
The election took place on 7 May 1998.

1998 Tower Hamlets London Borough Council election: Park (2)
Party	Candidate	Votes	%	±%
Liberal Democrats	Elizabeth Baunton	1,076		
Liberal Democrats	Derek Charles	958		
Labour	Alan Amos	418		
Labour	Philip Royal	392		
Turnout		2,844		
Liberal Democrats hold		Swing		
Liberal Democrats hold		Swing		

=== 1994 election ===
The election took place on 5 May 1994.

1994 Tower Hamlets London Borough Council election: Park (2)
Party	Candidate	Votes	%	±%
Liberal Democrats	Elizabeth Baunton	1,083		
Liberal Democrats	Paul Brown	911		
Labour	M.A. Roe	634		
Labour	Philip Royal	621		
Conservative	V.C. Benjamin	77		
Conservative	C. Parslew	68		
Turnout		3,865	49.1	
Liberal Democrats hold		Swing		
Liberal Democrats hold		Swing		

=== 1990 election ===
The election took place on 3 May 1990.

1990 Tower Hamlets London Borough Council election: Park (2)
Party	Candidate	Votes	%	±%
Liberal Democrats	Margaret Atkins	1,434	62.6	
Liberal Democrats	Gyles Glover	1,387		
Labour	Philip Royal	747	32.6	
Labour	Jonathan Sterne	725		
Green	Michael Foreman	59	2.6	
Conservative	David Ransom	49	2.1	
Conservative	John Livingstone	46		
Majority			30.0	
Turnout		4,290	54.2	
Liberal Democrats hold		Swing		
Liberal Democrats hold		Swing		

=== 1986 election ===
The election took place on 8 May 1986.

1986 Tower Hamlets London Borough Council election: Park (2)
Party	Candidate	Votes	%	±%
Liberal	Terence Cowley	1,154		
Liberal	Brian Williams	1,153		
Labour	Belle Harris	781		
Labour	Sean Gardiner	766		
Conservative	David Ranson	86		
Conservative	John Livingstone	73		
Majority				
Turnout		4,854	44.1	
Liberal hold		Swing		
Liberal hold		Swing		

=== 1982 election ===
The election took place on 6 May 1982.

1982 Tower Hamlets London Borough Council election: Park (2)
Party	Candidate	Votes	%	±%
Liberal	Brian Williams	1,229		
Liberal	Terence Cowley	1,143		
Labour	Jeffrey Crooks	648		
Labour	Walter Leary	591		
Majority				
Turnout				
Liberal hold		Swing		
Liberal hold		Swing		

=== 1978 election ===
The election took place on 4 May 1978.

1978 Tower Hamlets London Borough Council election: Park (2)
Party	Candidate	Votes	%	±%
Liberal	Brian Williams	1,174		
Liberal	Brenda Collins	1,117		
Labour	Thomas Beningfield	399		
Labour	Edmund Winterflood	357		
National Front	Thomas Matthews	128		
National Front	Rosina Muzzlewhite	122		
Majority				
Turnout		4,638	38.6	
Liberal win (new seat)				
Liberal win (new seat)				
