= Grove (Tower Hamlets ward) =

- Former electoral ward for the Tower Hamlets London Borough Council
- Grove ward boundaries
- Borough: Tower Hamlets
- County: Greater London
- Electorate: 4,183 (1998)
- Major settlements: Mile End

Former electoral ward
- Created: 1978
- Abolished: 2002
- Councillors: 2

Grove was an electoral ward in the London Borough of Tower Hamlets from 1978 to 2002. The ward was first used in the 1978 elections and last used for the 1998 elections. It returned two councillors to Tower Hamlets London Borough Council.

== Tower Hamlets council elections ==
=== 1998 election ===
The election on 7 May 1998 took place on the same day as the 1998 Greater London Authority referendum.

1998 Tower Hamlets London Borough Council election: Grove
Party	Candidate	Votes	%	±%
Liberal Democrats	Janet Ludlow	874	52.20	▲1.05
Liberal Democrats	Ricky Hunn	848		
Labour	Olwen Jacobs	704	40.95	▲2.33
Labour	Jonathan Swain	674		
Conservative	Syed Hoque	113	6.85	▲2.88
Registered electors		4,183		▲226
Turnout		1,770	42.31	▼8.94
Rejected ballots		15	0.85	▲0.41
Liberal Democrats hold				
Liberal Democrats hold				

=== 1994 election ===
The election took place on 5 May 1994.

1994 Tower Hamlets London Borough Council election: Grove
Party	Candidate	Votes	%	±%
Liberal Democrats	Janet Ludlow	991	51.15	▼8.76
Liberal Democrats	Ricky Hunn	968		
Labour	Anthony Everington	777	38.62	▲6.66
Labour	Anthony Sharpe	702		
Green	Stephen Petter	120	6.26	▲1.01
Conservative	John Livingstone	94	3.97	▲1.09
Conservative	Barbara Perrott	58		
Registered electors		3,957		▲165
Turnout		2,028	51.25	▼1.18
Rejected ballots		9	0.44	▲0.19
Liberal Democrats hold				
Liberal Democrats hold				

=== 1990 election ===
The election took place on 3 May 1990.

1990 Tower Hamlets London Borough Council election: Grove
Party	Candidate	Votes	%	±%
Liberal Democrats	Eric Flounders	1,169	59.91	
Liberal Democrats	Janet Ludlow	1,159		
Labour	William Wakefield	637	31.96	
Labour	Emmanuel Penner	604		
Green	Stephen Petter	102	5.25	
Conservative	Barbara Perrott	61	2.88	
Conservative	Linda Ransom	51		
Registered electors		3,792		
Turnout		1988	52.43	
Rejected ballots		5	0.25	
Liberal Democrats hold		Swing		
Liberal Democrats hold		Swing		

=== 1986 election ===
The election took place on 8 May 1986.

1986 Tower Hamlets London Borough Council election: Grove
Party	Candidate	Votes	%	±%
Liberal	Eric Flounders	1,049		
Liberal	Janet Ludlow	1,011		
Labour	John Griffin	701		
Labour	Julia Mainwaring	685		
Conservative	Barbara Perrott	104		
Conservative	Linda Ransom	81		
Majority				
Turnout		4,079	47.5	
Liberal hold		Swing		
Liberal hold		Swing		

=== 1983 by-election ===
The by-election took place on 7 July 1983, following the resignation of Edward Lewis.

1983 Grove by-election
Party	Candidate	Votes	%	±%
Liberal	Janet Ludlow	1,105		
Labour	Belle Harris	414		
Majority		691		
Turnout		3,771	40.4	
Liberal hold		Swing		

=== 1982 election ===
The election took place on 6 May 1982.

1982 Tower Hamlets London Borough Council election: Grove
Party	Candidate	Votes	%	±%
Liberal	Eric Flounders	986		
Liberal	Edward Lewis	898		
Labour	James Brooke	554		
Labour	Belle Harris	547		
Conservative	Caroline Sayer	86		
Conservative	Linda Ransom	81		
Majority				
Turnout				
Liberal hold		Swing		

=== 1978 election ===
The election took place on 4 May 1978.

1978 Tower Hamlets London Borough Council election: Grove
Party	Candidate	Votes	%	±%
Liberal	Eric Flounders	933		
Liberal	Irene Seabrook	850		
Labour	James Brooke	584		
Labour	Albert Snooks	554		
Conservative	Caroline Evans	141		
National Front	Edwin Smith	90		
National Front	James Buttery	89		
Majority				
Turnout		4,451	39.5	
Liberal win (new seat)				
Liberal win (new seat)				
