= 1998 Tower Hamlets London Borough Council election =

Local election in England

- 7 May 1998

All 50 seats up for election to Tower Hamlets London Borough Council 26 seats needed for a majority
- Registered: 123,433
- Turnout: 44,521, 36.07% (▼17.98)

	First party	Second party
Leader	Michael J. Keith	Unknown
Party	Labour	Liberal Democrats
Leader since	1997	Unknown
Leader's seat	Shadwell	Unknown
Last election	43 seats, 55.42%	7 seats, 27.24%
Seats before	42	7
Seats won	41	9
Seat change	▼2	▲2
Popular vote	56,488	26,689
Percentage	54.47%	25.74%
Swing	▼0.95	▼1.50
	Third party	Fourth party
Leader	Unknown	N/A
Party	Conservative	Independent
Leader since	Unknown	N/A
Leader's seat	Unknown	N/A
Last election	0 seats, 3.57%	0 seats, 0.74%
Seats before	0	1
Seats won	0	0
Seat change	Steady	▼1
Popular vote	10,671	3,432
Percentage	10.29%	3.31%
Swing	▲6.72	▲2.57
Council control before election
Labour
Council control after election
Labour

Elections to Tower Hamlets London Borough Council were held on 7 May 1998. The whole council was up for election and the Labour Party kept overall control of the council.

== Background ==
In the years between the 1994 election and this election there were a total of 5 by-elections organised to replace councillors who either resigned from their seat or died while in office, these by-election however did not result in seats changing parties. During the same period there was also a defection of a Labour councillor to a third party, which meant that the composition of the council just before the election was as follows:

↓
42	7	1
Labour	Lib Dem	Other

== Election result ==
1998 Tower Hamlets London Borough Council local elections
Party	Seats	Gains	Losses	Net gain/loss	Seats %	Votes %	Votes	+/−
Labour	41 (Note: Results include those from a St Mary's ward councillor standing under the Labour and Co-operative Party banner)	0	2	▼2	82.00	54.47	56,488	▼0.95
Liberal Democrats	9	2	0	▲2	18.00	25.74	26,689	▼1.50
Conservative	0	0	0	Steady	0.00	10.29	10,671	▲6.72
Ind. Lib Dem	0	0	0	Steady	0.00	3.62	3,758	▼1.46
Independent	0	0	1	▼1	0.00	3.31	3,432	▲2.57
BNP	0	0	0	Steady	0.00	2.31	2,391	▼3.99
National Front	0	0	0	Steady	0.00	0.26	270	New
Total	50						103,699	

After the election the composition of the council was as follows:

↓
41	9
Labour	Lib Dem

== Ward results ==
(*) - Indicates an incumbent candidate

(†) - Indicates an incumbent candidate standing in a different ward

=== Blackwall ===
Blackwall (2)
Party	Candidate	Votes	%	±%
Labour	Stephen L. Wright	701	64.56	▼6.42
Labour	Khan A. Murshid	691		
Liberal Democrats	Jane M. Jackson	287	24.54	▲3.62
Liberal Democrats	Patricia A. Ramsay	242		
Conservative	Crispin B. Hayhoe	128	10.90	▲2.80
Conservative	Sarah Hoile	107		
Registered electors		3,669		▲537
Turnout		1,256	34.23	▼18.69
Rejected ballots		32	2.55	▲1.46
Labour hold				
Labour hold				

=== Bow ===
Bow (3)
Party	Candidate	Votes	%	±%
Liberal Democrats	Raymond G. Gipson*	1,138	52.87	▼0.71
Liberal Democrats	Terry J. Stacy	1,063		
Liberal Democrats	Marian Williams	1,010		
Labour	Arthur W. Downes	797	37.64	▼2.53
Labour	Arun K. Chattopadhyay	793		
Labour	Benjamin Leapman	696		
Conservative	Tafique A. Chowdhury	246	9.48	▲3.23
Conservative	Simon M. Gordon-Clark	138		
Registered electors		6,452		▲326
Turnout		2,222	34.44	▼9.80
Rejected ballots		15	0.68	▼0.17
Liberal Democrats hold				
Liberal Democrats hold				
Liberal Democrats hold				

=== Bromley ===
Bromley (3)
Party	Candidate	Votes	%	±%
Labour	Arthur W. Downes*	2,040	62.22	▼6.22
Labour	Carol M. Hinvest*	1,293		
Labour	Betheline Chattopadhyay	1.116		
Liberal Democrats	Bernard Cameron	666	28.51	▲10.15
Liberal Democrats	Rosemarie Peters	580		
Liberal Democrats	Ron Converson	547		
Conservative	John S. Livingstone	239	9.27	▲4.72
Conservative	Barbara J. Perrott	187		
Conservative	Gregory M. Price	157		
Registered electors		7,225		▲1,005
Turnout		2,645	36.61	▼13.21
Rejected ballots		36	1.36	▲0.81
Labour hold				
Labour hold				
Labour hold				

=== East India ===
East India (2)
Party	Candidate	Votes	%	±%
Labour	Brian J. Son	826	61.28	▲3.20
Labour	Rajib Ahmed	790		
Liberal Democrats	Nigel P. Huxted	432	28.93	▼8.98
Liberal Democrats	Annabelle J. Steggles	331		
Conservative	Nathaniel Cross	129	9.78	▲5.77
Registered electors		4,606		▲352
Turnout		1,480	32.13	▼24.45
Rejected ballots		17	1.15	▲0.28
Labour hold				
Labour hold				

=== Grove ===
Grove (2)
Party	Candidate	Votes	%	±%
Liberal Democrats	Janet Ludlow*	874	52.20	▲1.05
Liberal Democrats	Frederick C. Hunn*	848		
Labour	Olwen M. Jacobs	704	40.95	▲2.33
Labour	Jonathan Swain	674		
Conservative	Syed E. Hoque	113	6.85	▲2.88
Registered electors		4,183		▲226
Turnout		1,770	42.31	▼8.94
Rejected ballots		15	0.85	▲0.41
Liberal Democrats hold				
Liberal Democrats hold				

=== Holy Trinity ===
Holy Trinity (3)
Party	Candidate	Votes	%	±%
Liberal Democrats	Albert J. Snooks	1,358	44.11	▲20.34
Liberal Democrats	Barrie C. Duffey	1,342		
Labour	Salim Ullah	1,314	40.56	▲5.52
Liberal Democrats	Rosina S. Tucker	1,270		
Labour	Judith A. Gardiner^{†} (Note: Gardiner was a sitting Councillor representing the St Mary's ward. She was elected in a by-election triggered by the resignation of Cllr. Amanda Linton in 1996)	1,181		
Labour	Anthony J. Sharpe	1,156		
Conservative	Mustak Syed	313	10.43	New
BNP	Paul Costello	147	4.90	▼14.58
Registered electors		7,483		▼1,216
Turnout		2,992	39.98	▼18.28
Rejected ballots		21	0.70	▲0.40
Liberal Democrats gain from Labour				
Liberal Democrats gain from Labour				
Labour hold				

=== Lansbury ===
Lansbury (3)
Party	Candidate	Votes	%	±%
Labour	Diana R. Johnson*	1,082	40.75	▼4.84
Labour	Michael C. Keating* (Note: Keating was elected in a by-election triggered by the resignation of Cllr. Eric A. Commons in 1994)	1,023		
Labour	Kevin V. Morton*	964		
Liberal Democrats	Barry A. Blandford	692	23.95	▼12.07
Liberal Democrats	Peter Carlin	604		
Liberal Democrats	Russell P. Neale	508		
Independent	David A. Hemingway	499	19.88	▲4.38
National Front	Lynda Miller	270	10.76	New
Conservative	Harry C. Benham	137	4.66	▲1.77
Conservative	Sharon Jones	107		
Conservative	James Mclachlan	107		
Registered electors		6,255		▲484
Turnout		2,548	40.74	▼16.01
Rejected ballots		30	1.18	▲0.72
Labour hold				
Labour hold				
Labour hold				

=== Limehouse ===
Limehouse (3)
Party	Candidate	Votes	%	±%
Labour	Helal U. Abbas	928	26.35	▼32.51
Labour	David J. Edgar*	778		
Labour	Soyful Alom*	771		
Independent	William E. Wakefield* (Note: Wakefield was elected in a by-election triggered by the resignation of Cllr. John P. Ryan in 1995. Wakefield was elected as a Labour councillor but was not selected to represent Labour in this election)	520	16.59	New
Liberal Democrats	Timothy J. McNally	443	13.54	▼20.59
Independent	Maurice Caplan	441	14.07	New
Liberal Democrats	Stewart G. Rayment	431		
Independent	Abu H. M. E. Hossain	425	13.56	New
Independent	Parvin Begum	402	12.83	New
Liberal Democrats	Martin J. Pantling	399		
Independent	Derek England	388	12.38	New
Conservative	Motiur Rahman	260	4.73	▲1.39
Conservative	Pamela Drew	101		
Conservative	Paul A. Goodman	84		
Registered electors		6,175		▲984
Turnout		2,406	38.96	▼15.73
Rejected ballots		27	1.12	▲0.42
Labour hold				
Labour hold				
Labour hold				

=== Millwall ===
Millwall (3)
Party	Candidate	Votes	%	±%
Labour	Julia Mainwaring*	2,315	61.18	▲10.84
Labour	Martin F. Young*	2,315		
Labour	Stephen J. Molyneaux*	2,279		
BNP	David J. Hill	665	16.89	▼9.77
BNP	Gordon F. Callow	637		
BNP	Steven R. Harrington	606		
Conservative	Philip W. Groves	495	12.86	▲9.24
Conservative	Jennifer Kendall-Tobias	489		
Conservative	William G. D. Norton	468		
Liberal Democrats	Richard D. Flowers	371	9.07	▼2.94
Liberal Democrats	Alexander I. M. C. Wilcock	335		
Liberal Democrats	Linda C. Hunn	318		
Registered electors		12,191		▲1,659
Turnout		4,130	33.88	▼32.62
Rejected ballots		21	0.51	▲0.35
Labour hold				
Labour hold				
Labour hold				

=== Park ===
Park (2)
Party	Candidate	Votes	%	±%
Liberal Democrats	Elizabeth Baunton*	1,076	71.52	▲12.80
Liberal Democrats	Derek Charles	958		
Labour	Alan T. Amos	418	28.48	▼8.50
Labour	Philip N. Royal	392		
Registered electors		4,067		▲202
Turnout		1,603	39.41	▼10.06
Rejected ballots		16	1.00	▲0.22
Liberal Democrats hold				
Liberal Democrats hold				

=== Redcoat ===
Redcoat (2)
Party	Candidate	Votes	%	±%
Labour	Ataur Rahman^{†} (Note: Rahman was a sitting councillor representing the Spitalfields ward)	922	55.04	▼2.88
Labour	David P. Bayat	906		
Liberal Democrats	James Lanagan	636	37.19	▼1.45
Liberal Democrats	Josephine G. Harriott	599		
Conservative	Bob Neill	129	7.77	▲4.33
Registered electors		4,639		▲54
Turnout		1,793	38.65	▼18.10
Rejected ballots		14	0.78	▼0.57
Labour hold				
Labour hold				

=== St Dunstan's ===
St Dunstan's (3)
Party	Candidate	Votes	%	±%
Labour	John R. Biggs*	1,412	68.14	▼3.59
Labour	Shahab U. Ahmed	1,231		
Labour	Mohammed S. Uddin*	1,220		
Conservative	Edna Hill	602	31.86	New
Registered electors		6,224		▼6
Turnout		2,077	33.37	▼18.86
Rejected ballots		42	2.02	▲0.27
Labour hold				
Labour hold				
Labour hold				

=== St James' ===
St James' (2)
Party	Candidate	Votes	%	±%
Labour	Mark E. Taylor*	941	45.39	▼2.41
Labour	Lorraine K. Melvin*	889		
Liberal Democrats	Barrie P. Martin	847	41.87	▲11.62
Liberal Democrats	John D. M. Griffiths	841		
BNP	Paul Maxwell	168	8.33	▼13.62
BNP	Paul E. McHale	168		
Conservative	Mohammed H. Ullah	89	4.41	New
Registered electors		5,234		▲409
Turnout		2,136	40.81	▼20.08
Rejected ballots		23	1.08	▲0.67
Labour hold				
Labour hold				

=== St Katharines ===
St Katharines (3)
Party	Candidate	Votes	%	±%
Labour	Denise Jones*	1,582	46.33	▲0.72
Labour	Abdul Asad*	1,496		
Labour	Anamul Hoque	1,333		
Conservative	Jane E. Emmerson	1,206	36.05	▲28.60
Conservative	Mostofa Miah	1,082		
Liberal Democrats	Gyles R. Glover	610	17.62	▼7.77
Liberal Democrats	Hilal Miah	540		
Liberal Democrats	Patricia Snooks	528		
Registered electors		10,689		▲1,507
Turnout		3,469	32.45	▼15.35
Rejected ballots		42	1.21	▲0.79
Labour hold				
Labour hold				
Labour hold				

=== St Mary's ===
St Mary's (2)
Party	Candidate	Votes	%	±%
Labour	Motin Uz-Zaman	826	69.67	▲2.99
Labour Co-op	Alexander K. Heslop	819		
Conservative	Habibur R. Choudhury	358	30.33	▲25.97
Registered electors		4,360		▲28
Turnout		1,312	30.09	▼25.02
Rejected ballots		42	3.20	▲2.44
Labour hold				
Labour Co-op hold				

=== St Peter's ===
St Peter's (3)
Party	Candidate	Votes	%	±%
Labour	Jusna Begum	1,405	46.71	▲1.86
Labour	Raja Miah	1,223		
Labour	Raymond V. Marney*	1,218		
Liberal Democrats	Mohammed J. U. Chowdhury	802	20.68	▲7.45
Ind. Lib Dem	Kathleen E. Cook	798	23.97	▲4.97
Ind. Lib Dem	Brian K. Lafferty	590		
Ind. Lib Dem	Betty Wright	586		
Liberal Democrats	Timothy O'Flaherty	460		
Liberal Democrats	Michael Elston	441		
Conservative	Joy M. Tarbey	237	8.63	▲5.42
Registered electors		8,260		▲150
Turnout		3,036	36.76	▼16.33
Rejected ballots		23	0.76	▲0.46
Labour hold				
Labour hold				
Labour hold				

=== Shadwell ===
Shadwell (3)
Party	Candidate	Votes	%	±%
Labour	Michael J. Keith* (Note: Keith was elected in a by-election triggered by the death of Cllr. Lilley Albert in 1994)	1,346	48.62	▼2.76
Labour	Bodrul M. Alom^{†} (Note: Alom was a sitting councillor representing the St Mary's ward)	1,229		
Labour	Abdus Shukur*	1,112		
Independent	Abdul Malik	757	29.94	New
Conservative	Richard H. Powell	589	21.44	▲12.65
Conservative	Paul W. E. Ingham	547		
Conservative	Lawrence Ailreu-Thomas	490		
Registered electors		8,014		▲1,182
Turnout		2,552	31.84	▼19.54
Rejected ballots		41	1.61	▲0.76
Labour hold				
Labour hold				
Labour hold				

=== Spitalfields ===
Spitalfields (3)
Party	Candidate	Votes	%	±%
Labour	Syed A. Mizan*	1,454	70.39	▲22.89
Labour	Ghulam Mortuza*	1,435		
Labour	Ala Uddin^{†} (Note: Uddin was a sitting councillor representing the St Peter's ward)	1,316		
Conservative	Eaoyor Shaikh	621	29.61	▲20.82
Conservative	David Webb	558		
Registered electors		6,451		▼381
Turnout		2,183	33.84	▼17.54
Rejected ballots		46	2.11	▲1.26
Labour hold				
Labour hold				
Labour hold				

=== Weavers ===
Weavers (3)
Party	Candidate	Votes	%	±%
Labour	Mohammed Ali* (Note: Ali was ekected in a by-election triggered by the resignation of Cllr. Vanessa L. Peters in 1995)	1,229	40.96	▼2.72
Labour	Christopher G. Creegan	985		
Labour	Catherine Tuitt	922		
Liberal Democrats	Kofi B. Appiah	776	29.55	▲3.11
Ind. Lib Dem	Terry B. Milson	770	23.30	▼7.58
Liberal Democrats	Abdul M. Khan	748		
Liberal Democrats	Jonathan P. Mathews	738		
Ind. Lib Dem	Kathleen Caulfield	705		
Ind. Lib Dem	Justin Sillman	309		
Conservative	Mohammed S. Uddin	158	6.19	New
Registered electors		7,256		▲511
Turnout		2,911	40.12	▲12.96
Rejected ballots		31	1.06	▼0.52
Labour hold				
Labour hold				
Labour hold				
