= Lansbury (ward) =

Electoral ward in Tower Hamlets, England

- Electoral ward for the Tower Hamlets London Borough Council
- Borough: Tower Hamlets
- County: Greater London
- Population: 21,706 (2021)
- Area: 1.266 km²

Current electoral ward
- Created: 2014
- Councillors: 3

Lansbury is an electoral ward in the London Borough of Tower Hamlets. The ward was first used in the 2014 elections. It returns three councillors to Tower Hamlets London Borough Council. It was previously used from 1978 to 2002.

== Geography ==
The ward is based on the Lansbury Estate named after the former leader of the opposition George Lansbury who was a Member of Parliament in Tower Hamlets.

== Councillors ==
Election	Councillors		
2014	Rajib Ahmed (Labour)	Shiria Khatun (Labour)	Ohid Ahmed (Tower Hamlets First)
2018	Kahar Chowdhury (Labour)	Muhammad Harun (Labour)	Bex White (Labour)
2022	Ohid Ahmed (Aspire)	Iqbal Hossain (Aspire)	Jahed Choudhury (Aspire)

== Elections ==
=== 2022 Tower Hamlets London Borough Council election ===
Lansbury (3)
Party	Candidate	Votes	%	±%
Aspire	Abul Ahmed	2,686	48.75	+21.19
Aspire	Iqbal Hossain	2,413	43.79	+25.91
Aspire	Jahed Choudhury	2,286	41.49	+23.60
Labour	Kahar Chowdhury*	1,803	32.72	−10.71
Labour	Shaheda Rahman	1,542	27.99	−9.92
Labour	Ansarul Haque	1,479	26.84	−10.48
Green	Norm Cassidy	546	9.91	+2.26
Liberal Democrats	Elaine Bagshaw	494	8.97	−1.34
Green	John Scanlan	464	8.42	+1.70
Conservative	Chrissie Townsend	373	6.77	−1.31
Conservative	Paul Ingham	333	6.04	−1.83
Conservative	Akbar Ali	203	3.68	−1.33
Liberal Democrats	Abdul Manik	149	2.70	−7.57
Liberal Democrats	Muhammad Uddin	134	2.43	−3.64
Rejected ballots		74		
Turnout		5,510	41.34	+0.03
Registered electors		13,330		
Aspire gain from Labour		Swing		
Aspire gain from Labour		Swing		
Aspire gain from Labour		Swing		

=== 2018 ===
Lansbury (3)
Party	Candidate	Votes	%	±%
Labour	Kahar Chowdhury	2,140	43.43	+2.35
Labour	Muhammad Harun	1,868	37.91	+1.20
Labour	Bex White	1,839	37.32	+2.53
Aspire	Ohid Ahmed*	1,358	27.56	−8.85
Aspire	Jahed Choudhury	980	19.89	N/A
Aspire	Shully Akthar	881	17.88	−14.60
PATH	Abdul Sheikh	646	13.11	N/A
Liberal Democrats	Jack Gilbert	506	10.27	+5.91
Liberal Democrats	Oliver McQueen	506	10.27	N/A
Conservative	Mumshad Afruz	398	8.08	+0.80
Conservative	Paul Ingham	388	7.87	+1.63
Green	Katy Guttmann	377	7.65	N/A
PATH	Syed Miah	354	7.18	N/A
PATH	Muhammad Uddin	337	6.84	N/A
Green	John Urpeth	331	6.72	N/A
Liberal Democrats	Tara Hussain	299	6.07	N/A
Conservative	Hanad Darwish	247	5.01	+0.72
Independent	Monsur Khan	167	3.39	N/A
Rejected ballots		56		
Turnout		4,983	41.31	
Registered electors		12,063		
Labour hold		Swing		
Labour hold		Swing		
Labour gain from Tower Hamlets First		Swing		

=== 2014 ===
Lansbury (3)
Party	Candidate	Votes	%	±%
Labour	Rajib Ahmed	2,184	41.08	
Labour	Shiria Khatun	1,952	36.71	
Tower Hamlets First	Ohid Ahmed	1,936	36.41	
Labour	Dave Smith	1,850	34.79	
Tower Hamlets First	Shuily Akthar	1,727	32.48	
Tower Hamlets First	Stephen Beckett	1,535	28.87	
UKIP	Paul Shea	732	13.77	
Conservative	Graham Collins	387	7.28	
Conservative	Paul Ingham	332	6.24	
Liberal Democrats	Simon McGrath	232	4.36	
Conservative	Mohammed Riaz	228	4.29	
TUSC	Pete Dickenson	190	3.57	
Turnout		5,371	51.29	
Labour win (new seat)				
Labour win (new seat)				
Tower Hamlets First win (new seat)				
