= 1982 Tower Hamlets London Borough Council election =

1982 local election in England

← 1978	6 May 1982	1986 →

All 50 council seats of the Tower Hamlets London Borough Council 26 seats needed for a majority
Council control before election
Labour
Subsequent council control
Labour

Elections to Tower Hamlets London Borough Council were held on Thursday 6 May 1982. The whole council was up for election. Turnout was 30.6%.

== Election result ==
Tower Hamlets local election result 1982
Party	Seats	Gains	Losses	Net gain/loss	Seats %	Votes %	Votes	+/−
Labour	31					44.1		
Alliance	18					37.3		
Other parties	1							
Conservative	0					8.5		

== Ward results ==
Member of the old council*

=== Bow ===
Bow (3)
Party	Candidate	Votes	%	±%
Liberal	Ronald Lebar*	1,004	58.3	
Liberal	Patricia L Catchpole	980		
Liberal	Jonathan Price	924		
Labour	Hilary J Price	661	39.0	
Labour	Patricia E Rackley	659		
Labour	Leonard Coan	626		
Conservative		138	2.8	
Majority				
Turnout				
Liberal hold		Swing		

=== Bromley ===
Bromley (3)
Party	Candidate	Votes	%	±%
Labour	William T G Guy*	1,046		
Labour	Arthur W Downes*	1,041		
Labour	Patrick A Desmond	1,001		
Liberal	Terence McGrenera	886		
Liberal	John P Nudds	847		
Liberal	Martin A Rabicano	797		
Conservative	Christopher A Sayer	172		
Majority				
Turnout				
Labour hold		Swing		

=== Grove ===
Grove (2)
Party	Candidate	Votes	%	±%
Liberal	Eric Flounders*	986		
Liberal	Edward Lewis	898		
Labour	James T Brooke	554		
Labour	Belle Harris	547		
Conservative	Caroline K Sayer	86		
Conservative	Linda Ransom	81		
Majority				
Turnout				
Liberal hold		Swing		

=== Holy Trinity ===
Holy Trinity (3)
Party	Candidate	Votes	%	±%
Liberal	Stephen Charters	1,434		
Liberal	Jennifer P Hearn	1,427		
Liberal	Jeanette P Smallwood	1,397		
Labour	Albert J Snooks	912		
Labour	Terence J McCarthy	876		
Labour	Joseph O'Connor*	810		
Conservative	Barbara J Perrott	118		
Majority				
Turnout				
Liberal gain from Labour		Swing		

=== Park ===
Park (2)
Party	Candidate	Votes	%	±%
Liberal	Brian Williams*	1,229		
Liberal	Terence Cowley	1,143		
Labour	Jeffrey Crooks	648		
Labour	Walter Leary	591		
Majority				
Turnout				
Liberal hold		Swing		

=== St James' ===
St James' (2)
Party	Candidate	Votes	%	±%
Liberal	Barrie Duffey	1,021		
Liberal	Elizabeth Hewison	958		
Labour	George M Browne*	552		
Labour	Hannah Morsman*	512		
Conservative	Christopher W Nolan	109		
Conservative	Peter E Sayer	99		
National Front	Albert Bennett	48		
National Front	Sylvia Bartlett	43		
Majority				
Turnout				
Liberal gain from Labour		Swing		

=== St Peter's ===
St Peter's (3)
Party	Candidate	Votes	%	±%
Liberal	Andrew R Goodchild	1,726		
Liberal	Dennis Hallam	1,699		
Liberal	Patrick T Streeter	1,690		
Labour	Albert C Jacob*	721		
Labour	Beatrice Orwell*	700		
Labour	Edwin G Walker*	650		
National Front	Victor J Clark	121		
National Front	Albert Mariner	92		
National Front	Susan I Clapp	88		
Majority				
Turnout				
Liberal gain from Labour		Swing		

=== Spitalfields ===
Spitalfields (3)
Party	Candidate	Votes	%	±%
Independent	Muhammed N Huque	638		
Labour	Annie Elboz*	560		
Labour	Susan M Carlyle	556		
Community Worker	Syed Islam	530		
Labour	Stephen Corbishley	496		
SDP	William Kelly	417		
SDP	Muhammed G Mustafa	407		
Conservative	Jane Emmerson	215		
SDP	Geoffrey G White	401		
Independent	Abdul Gofur	173		
Independent	Sherajul Hoque	157		
Majority				
Turnout				
Independent gain from Labour		Swing		

=== Weavers ===
Weavers (3)
Party	Candidate	Votes	%	±%
Liberal	Jeremy A Shaw	1,496	54.1	
Liberal	Peter J Hughes	1,435		
Liberal	Kofi B Appiah	1,396		
Labour	Edward Bishop*	754	27.3	
Labour	William Harris	664		
Labour	Sally A Tyley	612		
Conservative	Richard Dyer	267	9.7	
Independent	Mohammed A Hussain	246	8.9	
Majority			26.9	
Turnout			37.4	
Liberal gain from Labour		Swing		
