= 2006 Tower Hamlets London Borough Council election =

2006 Tower Hamlets Council election
← 2002	4 May 2006	2010 →

All council seats
	First party	Second party	Third party
Party	Labour	Respect	Conservative
Last election	35 seats, 45.7%	0 seats, 0%	0 seats, 15.1%
Seats won	26	12	7
Seat change	▼7	▲12	▲7
Popular vote	57,672	39,587	29,992
Percentage	33.2%	22.8%	17.3%
Swing	▼12.5%	▲22.8	▲2.2
	Fourth party
Party	Liberal Democrats
Last election	16 seats, 30.6%
Seats won	6
Seat change	▼10
Popular vote	32,314
Percentage	18.6%
Swing	▼12.0
- Map of the results of the 2006 Tower Hamlets council election. Conservatives in blue, Labour in red, Liberal Democrats in yellow and Respect in light red.
Leader of Largest Party before election
Labour
Subsequent Leader of Largest Party
Labour

Elections to Tower Hamlets London Borough Council were held on 4 May 2006. The entire council stood for election, and the Labour party retained control.

== Election result ==
Tower Hamlets local election result 2006
Party	Seats	Gains	Losses	Net gain/loss	Seats %	Votes %	Votes	+/−
Labour	26	10	17	-7	51.0	33.2	57,672	-12.5%
Respect	12	11	0	+11	23.5	22.8	39,587	+22.8%
Conservative	7	6	0	+6	13.7	17.3	29,992	+2.2%
Liberal Democrats	6	0	10	-10	11.8	18.6	32,314	-12.0%
Independent	0	0	0	0	0	4.2	7,271	+2.2%
Green	0	0	0	0	0	3.3	5,728	-1.4%
BNP	0	0	0	0	0	0.6	972	+0.3%

== Ward results ==
=== Bethnal Green North ===
Bethnal Green North (3)
Party	Candidate	Votes	%	±%
Labour	Mohammed Salique	1,108	28.3	
Liberal Democrats	Azizur Khan	1,096	28.0	
Liberal Democrats	Stephanie Eaton	960		
Liberal Democrats	John Griffiths	958		
Labour	Brian Boag	950		
Labour	Rachael Saunders	940		
Respect	Abu Choudhury	882	22.5	
Respect	Syed Hussain	592		
Respect	Sheila McGregor	475		
Conservative	Jamal Khan	436	11.1	
Conservative	Shamsu Miah	413		
Green	Elaine Maltby	398	10.2	
Green	Darren Chetty	373		
Green	Richard Simpson	354		
Conservative	Nishat Kabir	280		
Turnout			40.3	
Labour gain from Liberal Democrats		Swing		
Liberal Democrats hold		Swing		
Liberal Democrats hold		Swing		

=== Bethnal Green South ===
Bethnal Green South (3)
Party	Candidate	Votes	%	±%
Labour	Salim Ullah	1,609	36.4	
Labour	Sirajul Islam	1,593		
Labour	Carli Harper-Penman	1,436		
Respect	Syeda Hussain	1,342	30.4	
Respect	Afzal Mahmood	1,113		
Respect	John Rees	973		
Liberal Democrats	Akikur Rahman	876	19.8	
Liberal Democrats	Mohammed Haque	863		
Liberal Democrats	Mohammed Miah	689		
Green	Rachel Carless	327	7.4	
Green	Daniel Adams	324		
Conservative	Moynul Choudhury	264	6.0	
Green	Robert Dickinson	253		
Conservative	Christopher Bromby	237		
Conservative	Aurelia Greystoke	237		
Turnout			44.1	
Labour hold		Swing		
Labour gain from Liberal Democrats		Swing		
Labour hold		Swing		

=== Blackwall and Cubitt Town ===
Blackwall and Cubitt Town (3)
Party	Candidate	Votes	%	±%
Conservative	Tim Archer	1,317	34.4	
Conservative	Philip Briscoe	1,197		
Conservative	Peter Golds	1,142		
Labour	Julia Mainwaring	990	25.9	
Labour	Brian Son	903		
Labour	Anthony Sharpe	888		
Liberal Democrats	Shofu Miah	652	17.1	
Respect	Abdul Chowdhury	502	13.1	
Liberal Democrats	Barry Blandford	463		
Respect	Aysha Ali	411		
Liberal Democrats	Jahidul Hoque	402		
Independent	Shamsur Choudhury	362	9.5	
Respect	Terence Wells	273		
Independent	Eric Pemberton	152		
Independent	Shelima Choudhury	75		
Independent	Najma Rahman	58		
Turnout			32.9	
Conservative gain from Labour		Swing		
Conservative gain from Labour		Swing		
Conservative gain from Labour		Swing		

=== Bow East ===
Bow East (3)
Party	Candidate	Votes	%	±%
Labour	Marc Francis	1,314	42.0	
Labour	Alexander Heslop	1,156		
Labour	Ahmed Omer	1,126		
Liberal Democrats	Raymond Gipson	918	29.3	
Liberal Democrats	Marian Williams	765		
Liberal Democrats	Andrew Sage	740		
Respect	Sahra Ali	366	11.7	
Conservative	Andrew Palmer	321	10.3	
Respect	Christopher Nineham	309		
Respect	Tansy Hoskins	307		
Conservative	Priti Heath	290		
Conservative	William Norton	286		
Green	Andrea Krug	209	6.7	
Green	Alana Jelinek	201		
Turnout			37.6	
Labour gain from Liberal Democrats		Swing		
Labour gain from Liberal Democrats		Swing		
Labour gain from Liberal Democrats		Swing		

=== Bow West ===
Bow West (3)
Party	Candidate	Votes	%	±%
Labour	Anwara Ali	1,483	36.2	
Labour	Ann Jackson	1,442		
Labour	Joshua Peck	1,282		
Liberal Democrats	Janet Ludlow	1,099	26.8	
Liberal Democrats	Martin Rew	902		
Liberal Democrats	Stephen Clarke	896		
Conservative	Anwar Hussain	592	14.5	
Respect	Deeka Adan	505	12.3	
Respect	Robin Hirsch	445		
Respect	Carole Swords	425		
Green	Heather Finlay	415	10.1	
Green	John Foster	399		
Conservative	Francis Bown	380		
Conservative	Simon Gordon-Clark	364		
Turnout			45.2	
Labour gain from Liberal Democrats		Swing		
Labour gain from Liberal Democrats		Swing		
Labour gain from Liberal Democrats		Swing		

=== Bromley-by-Bow ===
Bromley-by-Bow (3)
Party	Candidate	Votes	%	±%
Labour	Abdul Sardar	1,689	34.3	
Respect	Rania Khan	1,308	26.6	
Respect	Mohammed Munim	1,077		
Independent	Helal Rahman	1,022	20.8	
Labour	Jo-Anna Coles	966		
Respect	Rebecca Townesend	923		
Labour	David Edgar	916		
Independent	Khaled Khan	851		
Green	Terry McGrenera	342	6.9	
Liberal Democrats	Koyes Choudhury	293	5.9	
Liberal Democrats	Brian Abson	271	5.5	
Conservative	Alison Newton	271		
Liberal Democrats	Mohammod Uddin	257		
Conservative	Barbara Perrott	254		
Conservative	Kazi Alam	242		
Turnout			48.5	
Labour hold		Swing		
Respect gain from Labour		Swing		
Respect gain from Labour		Swing		

=== East India and Lansbury ===
East India and Lansbury (3)
Party	Candidate	Votes	%	±%
Labour	Shiria Khatun	1,461	36.5	
Labour	Abul Ahmed	1,150		
Liberal Democrats	Rajib Ahmed	1,149	28.7	
Liberal Democrats	Iqbal Hossain	944		
Labour	Peter Ton-That	841		
Respect	Kambiz Boomla	607	15.2	
Respect	Mohammed Shahid	599		
Conservative	Jane Archer	542	13.6	
Conservative	Ian Campbell	511		
Conservative	Paul Ingham	483		
Liberal Democrats	Caroline Spencer	470		
Respect	Martin Hayward	436		
Independent	John Phillips	240	6.0	
Independent	Mahfuz Khan	122		
Turnout			39.8	
Labour hold		Swing		
Labour hold		Swing		
Liberal Democrats hold		Swing		

=== Limehouse ===
Limehouse (3)
Party	Candidate	Votes	%	±%
Labour	Mohammed Ali	1,208	27.6	
Respect	Lutfa Begum	1,099	25.1	
Respect	Dulal Uddin	1,092		
Labour	Judith Gardiner	1,017		
Labour	Ashton McGregor	960		
Conservative	Pennie Clarke	933	21.3	
Conservative	Philip Groves	886		
Respect	Martin Empson	854		
Conservative	Kenneth Mizzi	847		
Independent	Mohammed Hoque	662	15.1	
Independent	Abdul Jamal	630		
Liberal Democrats	Husheara Begum	470	10.8	
Liberal Democrats	John Bevan	382		
Liberal Democrats	Iain Chambers	324		
Turnout			43.0	
Labour hold		Swing		
Respect gain from Labour		Swing		
Respect gain from Labour		Swing		

=== Mile End and Globe Town ===
Mile End and Globe Town (3)
Party	Candidate	Votes	%	±%
Labour	Rofique Ahmed	1,380	32.9	
Labour	Clair Hawkins	1,113		
Labour	Bill Turner	1,050		
Respect	Mehdi Hassan	1,012	24.1	
Liberal Democrats	Mohammed Chowdhury	912	21.7	
Respect	Kay Ballard	816		
Liberal Democrats	Partab Ali	751		
Respect	Glyn Robbins	717		
Liberal Democrats	Barrie Duffey	627		
Conservative	Kobir Ahmed	481	11.5	
BNP	Gordon Callow	411	9.8	
BNP	William Wren	375		
Conservative	Michael Fletcher	264		
Conservative	Andrew McNeils	234		
BNP	Jeffrey Marshall	186		
Turnout			40.3	
Labour gain from Liberal Democrats		Swing		
Labour hold		Swing		
Labour gain from Liberal Democrats		Swing		

=== Mile End East ===
Mile End East (3)
Party	Candidate	Votes	%	±%
Labour	Motin Uz-Zaman	1,338	32.3	
Respect	Ahmed Hussain	993	24.0	
Labour	Rupert Bawden	897		
Liberal Democrats	Misbahur Khan	828	20.0	
Respect	Ismail Hussain	753		
Respect	Jacqueline Turner	752		
Liberal Democrats	Shamsul Syed	742		
Labour	Betheline Chattopadhyay	696		
Independent	Hafizur Choudhury	531	12.8	
Conservative	Jewel Islam	454	11.0	
Liberal Democrats	Stewart Rayment	454		
Conservative	Graham Collins	346		
Conservative	Caroline Rouse	312		
Turnout			41.7	
Labour hold		Swing		
Respect gain from Labour		Swing		
Labour hold		Swing		

=== Millwall ===
Millwall (3)
Party	Candidate	Votes	%	±%
Conservative	Simon Rouse	1,724	43.8	
Conservative	Shirley Houghton	1,685		
Conservative	Rupert Eckhardt	1,679		
Labour	Alan Amos	1,248	31.7	
Labour	John Cray	1,128		
Labour	Arip Miah	1,084		
Respect	Mohammed Alam-Raja	606	15.4	
Respect	Sybil Cock	398		
Liberal Democrats	Patricia Ramsay	358	9.1	
Respect	Julia Taher	312		
Liberal Democrats	Nigel Huxted	301		
Liberal Democrats	Ian McDonald	300		
Turnout			32.3	
Conservative gain from Labour		Swing		
Conservative gain from Labour		Swing		
Conservative gain from Labour		Swing		

=== Shadwell ===
Shadwell (3)
Party	Candidate	Votes	%	±%
Respect	Shamim Chowdhury	1,851	46.5	
Respect	Abjol Miah	1,789		
Respect	Mohammed Rashid	1,707		
Labour	Michael Keith	1,287		
Labour	Humayun Kabir	1,141	28.7	
Labour	Abdus Shukur	1,054		
Conservative	William Crossey	723	18.2	
Conservative	David Snowdon	670		
Conservative	Sajjadur Rahman	605		
Liberal Democrats	Catherine Buttimer	266	6.7	
Liberal Democrats	Phylis Sheehan	226		
Liberal Democrats	Mohammed Ali	205		
Turnout			46.2	
Respect gain from Labour		Swing		
Respect gain from Labour		Swing		
Respect gain from Labour		Swing		

=== Spitalfields and Banglatown ===
Spitalfields and Banglatown (3)
Party	Candidate	Votes	%	±%
Labour	Helal Abbas	912	24.4	
Respect	Fozol Miah	866	23.1	
Labour	Lutfur Rahman	860		
Labour	Mohammad Mortuza	775		
Independent	Mizanur Chaudhury	716	19.1	
Respect	Mohammad Islam	682		
Liberal Democrats	Mohammed Kamali	548	14.6	
Respect	Mohammed Choudhury	471		
Conservative	Dinul Shah	458	12.2	
Liberal Democrats	Mohammed Rahman	424		
Liberal Democrats	Guy Burton	354		
Conservative	Iqbal Hussain	329		
Green	Beth Collar	242	6.5	
Conservative	Hamid-Ur Chowdhury	241		
Green	Peter Lockley	191		
Turnout			43.8	
Labour hold		Swing		
Respect gain from Labour		Swing		
Labour hold		Swing		

=== St Dunstan's and Stepney Green ===
St Dunstan's and Stepney Green (3)
Party	Candidate	Votes	%	±%
Labour	Alibor Choudhury	1,453	30.0	
Labour	Abdal Ullah	1,410		
Respect	Oliur Rahman	1,351	27.9	
Labour	Mohammed Uddin	1,329		
Respect	Aleyk Miah	1,292		
Respect	Margaret Falshaw	954		
Liberal Democrats	Habibur Rahamn	747	15.4	
Independent	Ataur Rahman	669	13.8	
Conservative	Edwin Northover	630	13.0	
Conservative	Alexander Story	590		
Liberal Democrats	Ahmed Mustaque	583		
Liberal Democrats	Farid Ahmed	550		
Conservative	Jane Meehan	373		
Turnout			44.3	
Labour hold		Swing		
Labour hold		Swing		
Respect gain from Labour		Swing		

=== St Katharine's and Wapping ===
St Katharine's and Wapping (3)
Party	Candidate	Votes	%	±%
Conservative	Emma Jones	1,351	39.9	
Labour	Shafiqul Haque	1,321	39.0	
Labour	Denise Jones	1,290		
Labour	Richard Brooks	1,231		
Conservative	Neil King	1,223		
Conservative	Paul Mawdsley	1,153		
Green	Martine Hall	364	10.8	
Green	Andrew Hall	359		
Liberal Democrats	Margaret Man	349	10.3	
Liberal Democrats	Ron Coverson	321		
Liberal Democrats	Alan Mead	305		
Turnout			35.5	
Conservative gain from Labour		Swing		
Labour hold		Swing		
Labour hold		Swing		

=== Weavers ===
Weavers (3)
Party	Candidate	Votes	%	±%
Liberal Democrats	Abdul Matin	1,819	40.7	
Liberal Democrats	Louise Alexander	1,059		
Liberal Democrats	Timothy O'Flaherty	948		
Labour	Fazlul Haque	854	19.1	
Respect	Dilwara Begum	830	18.6	
Labour	Amina Ali	652		
Labour	Nathan Oley	575		
Respect	Paul Fredericks	494		
Respect	Eliza Cox	489		
Green	Catherine Guttman	364	8.2	
Independent	Gias Ahmed	345	7.7	
Green	Daniel Jackson	321		
Green	Benjamin Hancocks	292		
Conservative	Simon Holmes	254	5.7	
Conservative	Hamida Chowdhury	249		
Conservative	Mark Walters	214		
Turnout			41.8	
Liberal Democrats hold		Swing		
Liberal Democrats hold		Swing		
Liberal Democrats hold		Swing		

=== Whitechapel ===
Whitechapel (3)
Party	Candidate	Votes	%	±%
Respect	Shahed Ali	1,449	35.1	
Labour	Abdul Asad	1,107	26.8	
Respect	Waiseul Islam	1,084		
Labour	Lutfur Rahman	1,040		
Labour	Doros Ullah	1,019		
Respect	Farhana Zaman	1,004		
Independent	Fanu Miah	650	15.7	
Liberal Democrats	Mohammed Haydar	529	12.8	
Liberal Democrats	Kate Grieve	511		
Liberal Democrats	Shamsuddin Ahmed	458		
Conservative	Muhammed Ahmed	397	9.6	
Conservative	Moya Frawley	344		
Conservative	Shah Suhel	284		
Independent	Mohammed Goni	186		
Turnout			39.9	
Respect gain from Labour		Swing		
Labour hold		Swing		
Respect gain from Labour		Swing		
