= People's Alliance of Tower Hamlets =

- Leader: Rabina Khan
- Founded: 26 February 2018
- Dissolved: 29 August 2018
- Split from: Tower Hamlets Independent Group
- Headquarters: 25 Callaghan Cottages; Lindsey Street; London

The People's Alliance of Tower Hamlets (PATH) was a minor political party in Tower Hamlets, London, England composed of councillors who had formerly been members of Tower Hamlets First and then the Tower Hamlets Independent Group. The group was formed by Cllr Rabina Khan and her husband Cllr Aminur Khan as a split from the Tower Hamlets Independent Group in November 2016. Khan disbanded the party in 29 August 2018 and later joined the Liberal Democrats.

== Background ==
Tower Hamlets First was established by Lutfur Rahman on 18 September 2013. The party stood candidates in the 2014 Tower Hamlets Council election, where it won 18 out of 45 seats, becoming the second largest party on Tower Hamlets Council, and the fifth largest political party out of all London borough councils. The party was suspended in 23 April 2015, after an Election Court report that found Rahman "personally guilty of 'corrupt or illegal practices' or both" with the party labelled as a "one-man band". The party was removed from the list of political parties maintained by the Electoral Commission on 29 April 2015.

Following the dissolution of Tower Hamlets First, the majority of former party members established the Tower Hamlets Independent Group (THIG) to co-ordinate activity on the council. Six members subsequently left the Tower Hamlets Independents to form the competing People's Alliance group. Cllr. Rabina Khan formally registered the People's Alliance of Tower Hamlets with the Electoral Commission on 26 February 2018.

== Initial representation ==
Until the elections on 3 May 2018, the People's Alliance of Tower Hamlets had 6 out of the 45 Council seats in the Tower Hamlets Council.

Ward	Councillor
Shadwell	Rabina Khan
Mile End	Shah Alam
St Peter's	Abjol Miah
Whitechapel	Abdul Asad
Whitechapel	Aminur Khan
Whitechapel	Shafi Ahmed

Rabina Khan had previously been elected as a Labour Party candidate and then as a Tower Hamlets First candidate. Abjol Miah was previously elected as a Respect Party councillor.

== 2018 elections and party disbands ==
Khan stood in the 2018 elections for directly elected Mayor of Tower Hamlets, coming second, and the party stood in all but one ward at the 2018 borough elections. Khan was re-elected as a Councillor, but the party won no other seats.

In August, Khan disbanded the party with her and colleagues switching to the Liberal Democrats.

Former PATH councillor Abjol Miah stood as a Liberal Democrat candidate in a by-election for the Shadwell ward on 7 February 2019. However, he was suspended from the party the day of the vote for sharing an antisemitic video on Twitter and Facebook in 2014 by David Duke.

== See also ==
- Aspire (political party)
