= 1986 Tower Hamlets London Borough Council election =

1986 local election in England

Elections to Tower Hamlets London Borough Council were held in May 1986. The whole council was up for election. Turnout was 35.0%.

== Election result ==
Tower Hamlets local election result 1986
Party	Seats	Gains	Losses	Net gain/loss	Seats %	Votes %	Votes	+/−
Alliance	26					42.7		
Labour	24					44.1		
Conservative	0				0.0	7.2		

== Results by ward ==
=== Blackwall ===
Blackwall (2)
Party	Candidate	Votes	%	±%
Labour	Christine Shawcroft	834	48.7	
SDP	Jonathan Mathews	788	47.1	
Labour	Sunahwar Ali	661		
SDP	Russell Neale	657		
Conservative	Robert Hughes	129	4.2	
Majority				
Turnout		4,139	42.3	
Labour hold		Swing		
SDP gain from Labour		Swing		

=== Bow ===
Bow (3)
Party	Candidate	Votes	%	±%
Liberal	Patricia Catchpole	1,198	58.1	
Liberal	Ronald Lebar	1,165		
Liberal	Anthony Wilcock	1,071		
Labour	Edward Caunter	795	39.0	
Labour	Wendy Allman	777		
Labour	Thomas Redmond	737		
Conservative	Bernard Jenkin	172	2.9	
Majority				
Turnout		6,278	34.6	
Liberal hold		Swing		
Liberal hold		Swing		
Liberal hold		Swing		

=== Bromley ===
Bromley (3)
Party	Candidate	Votes	%	±%
Labour	Arthur Downes	1,458	53.4	
Labour	Anne Delargy	1,450		
Labour	Neil McAree	1,403		
Liberal	Beryl Day	1,292	44.2	
Liberal	Peter Hughes	1,139		
Liberal	Zofia Hart	1,112		
Conservative	Ralph Harrison	166	2.1	
Majority				
Turnout		7,383	41.1	
Labour hold		Swing		
Labour hold		Swing		
Labour gain from Liberal		Swing		

=== East India ===
East India (2)
Party	Candidate	Votes	%	±%
Labour	Terence Connolly	906	54.6	
Labour	Patrick Little	800		
Liberal	Maurice Caplan	541	32.2	
Liberal	Anthony Peter	464		
Independent Labour	David Canning	318	10.2	
Conservative	Peter Sayer	95	3.0	
Majority				
Turnout		4,925	36.2	
Labour hold		Swing		
Labour hold		Swing		

=== Grove ===
Grove (2)
Party	Candidate	Votes	%	±%
Liberal	Eric Flounders	1,049	56.7	
Liberal	Janet Ludlow	1,011		
Labour	John Griffin	701	38.2	
Labour	Julia Mainwaring	685		
Conservative	Barbara Perrott	104	5.1	
Conservative	Linda Ransom	81		
Majority				
Turnout		4,079	47.5	
Liberal hold		Swing		
Liberal hold		Swing		

=== Holy Trinity ===
Holy Trinity (3)
Party	Candidate	Votes	%	±%
Liberal	Stephen Charters	1,526	52.7	
Liberal	Belinda Knowles	1,445		
Liberal	John Nudds	1,351		
Labour	Michael Chalkley	1,225	41.7	
Labour	Geoffrey Cade	1,167		
Labour	Salim Ullah	1,025		
BNP	David Ettridge	212	2.6	
Conservative	Anthony Norton	138	3.0	
Conservative	Anne-Marie Pedlingham	105		
Majority				
Turnout		6,836	44.7	
Liberal hold		Swing		
Liberal hold		Swing		
Liberal hold		Swing		

=== Lansbury ===
Lansbury (3)
Party	Candidate	Votes	%	±%
Liberal	Barry Blandford	1,119		
Liberal	Gwyneth Deakins	1,108		
Liberal	Pauline Fletcher	1,093		
Labour	Stephen Bowen	956		
Labour	Paul Collins	883		
Labour	Mary Hawkins	871		
Independent Labour	Reginald Beer	407		
Independent Labour	Paul Beasley	385		
Independent Labour	George Desmond	376		
Conservative	Christopher Kingsley-Smith	77		
Majority				
Turnout		6,853	38.7	
Liberal gain from Labour		Swing		
Liberal gain from Labour		Swing		
Liberal gain from Labour		Swing		

=== Limehouse ===
Limehouse (3)
Party	Candidate	Votes	%	±%
Liberal	David Lewis	1,223		
Liberal	Stewart Rayment	1,153		
Liberal	Carolyn Manser	1,147		
Labour	Dennis Twomey	1,142		
Labour	Michael Tyrrell	1,105		
Labour	Oona Hickson	1,055		
Conservative	David Hughes	147		
Conservative	Geoffrey Lenox-Smith	137		
Majority				
Turnout		7,064	38.2	
Liberal gain from Labour		Swing		
Liberal gain from Labour		Swing		
Liberal gain from Labour		Swing		

=== Millwall ===
Millwall (3)
Party	Candidate	Votes	%	±%
Labour	Alan Porter	1,119		
Labour	Maria Shanahan	1,114		
Labour	Timothy Staten	1,013		
SDP	John Moore	822		
SDP	Brian Kettell	738		
Island Independent	Peter Wade	702		
Island Independent	George Pye	701		
Island Independent	William Kilgour	687		
SDP	Arthur Praag	664		
Conservative	Peter Holland	204		
Majority				
Turnout		8,480	33.8	
Labour hold		Swing		
Labour hold		Swing		
Labour hold		Swing		

=== Park ===
Park (2)
Party	Candidate	Votes	%	±%
Liberal	Terence Cowley	1,154		
Liberal	Brian Williams	1,153		
Labour	Belle Harris	781		
Labour	Sean Gardiner	766		
Conservative	David Ranson	86		
Conservative	John Livingstone	73		
Majority				
Turnout		4,854	44.1	
Liberal hold		Swing		
Liberal hold		Swing		

=== Redcoat ===
Redcoat (2)
Party	Candidate	Votes	%	±%
Liberal	Christopher Birt	1,184		
Liberal	Ludlow Smith	1,158		
Labour	Stephen Joseph	920		
Labour	Walter Leary	907		
Conservative	Paul Ingham	159		
Conservative	Peter Ainsworth	126		
Majority				
Turnout		5,269	45.5	
Liberal gain from Labour		Swing		
Liberal gain from Labour		Swing		

=== St Dunstan's ===
St Dunstan's (3)
Party	Candidate	Votes	%	±%
Labour	Susan Carlyle	1,227		
Labour	Terence Sullivan	1,191		
Labour	Jahangir Alam	1,142		
Liberal	Julian Brett-Freeman	1,058		
Liberal	Lesley Morpurgo	924		
Liberal	Philip Truscott	911		
National Front	Roger Evans	256		
Conservative	Maureen Bashford	241		
Conservative	Kevin Collins	214		
Majority				
Turnout		6,742	40.7	
Labour hold		Swing		
Labour hold		Swing		
Labour hold		Swing		

=== St James' ===
St James' (2)
Party	Candidate	Votes	%	±%
Liberal	Barrie Duffey	833		
Labour	Albert Jacob	800		
Labour	Eileen Short	782		
Liberal	Mark Hook	757		
Conservative	Hugh Hunter	134		
Conservative	Hugh Smith	127		
Majority				
Turnout		5,222	35.5	
Liberal hold		Swing		
Labour gain from Liberal		Swing		

=== St Katharine's ===
St Katharine's (3)
Party	Candidate	Votes	%	±%
Labour	John Rowe	1,651		
Labour	Ashek Ali	1,562		
Labour	Mohammed Ahmed	1,513		
SDP	Konor Ali	714		
SDP	George Clark	695		
SDP	Moshahid Hussain	640		
Conservative	Adrian George	461		
Conservative	Andrew Smith	410		
Conservative	Sheila Folan	371		
Independent	Stephen Smith	84		
Majority				
Turnout		8,668	34.9	
Labour hold		Swing		
Labour hold		Swing		
Labour hold		Swing		

=== St Mary's ===
St Mary's (2)
Party	Candidate	Votes	%	±%
Labour	Robert Ashkettle	948		
Labour	Barnett Saunders	861		
SDP	Abdul Barik	316		
SDP	Paul Mathurin	253		
Conservative	Mohammad Ali	218		
Conservative	Robert Ingram	147		
Majority				
Turnout		4,848	31.1	
Labour hold		Swing		
Labour hold		Swing		

=== St Peter's ===
St Peter's (3)
Party	Candidate	Votes	%	±%
Liberal	Brenda Collins	1,324		
Liberal	Patrick Streeter	1,316		
Liberal	Andrew Goodchild	1,291		
Labour	Maureen Caldon	904		
Labour	Rosemary Maher	871		
Labour	Joseph Ramanoop	838		
Conservative	Amanda Drury	171		
Conservative	Nicholas Greenfield	143		
Majority				
Turnout		7,525	33.9	
Liberal hold		Swing		
Liberal hold		Swing		
Liberal hold		Swing		

=== Shadwell ===
Shadwell (3)
Party	Candidate	Votes	%	±%
Labour	Albert Lilley	1,121		
Labour	Charles Mudd	1,101		
Labour	John Riley	1,057		
SDP	David Webb	881		
SDP	John Minch	868		
SDP	Geoffrey White	810		
Conservative	Ronald Mitchell	198		
Majority				
Turnout		6,265	35.7	
Labour hold		Swing		
Labour hold		Swing		
Labour hold		Swing		

=== Spitalfields ===
Spitalfields (3)
Party	Candidate	Votes	%	±%
Labour	Abbas Uddin	1,246		
Labour	Ghulam Mortuza	1,019		
Labour	Philip Maxwell	988		
Independent	Muhammed Huque	837		
SDP	Akikur Rahman	590		
SDP	William Kelly	444		
Independent Labour	Syed Islam	402		
SDP	Muhammed Mustafa	387		
Conservative	Jane Emmerson	215		
Independent	Betty Wright	199		
Conservative	Andrew Chapman	189		
Majority				
Turnout		5,648	45.2	
Labour hold		Swing		
Labour hold		Swing		
Labour gain from Independent		Swing		

=== Weavers ===
Weavers (3)
Party	Candidate	Votes	%	±%
Liberal	Jeremy Shaw	1,645		
Liberal	Jeanette Welsh	1,530		
Liberal	Kofi Appiah	1,496		
Labour	Susan Hurley	1,336		
Labour	Mohammed Ludi	1,227		
Labour	John Onslow	1,201		
Conservative	Lillian Ingram	184		
Conservative	Linda O'Connell	146		
Majority				
Turnout		7,505	42.5	
Liberal hold		Swing		
Liberal hold		Swing		
Liberal hold		Swing		
