= Tower Hamlets First =

- Leader: Lutfur Rahman
- Founded: 18 September 2013
- Dissolved: 29 April 2015
- Succeeded by: Aspire

Tower Hamlets First was a local political party represented in Tower Hamlets London Borough Council, which was launched to contest the 2014 local elections in the Borough. During its existence, it was the second largest party on Tower Hamlets Council and the fifth largest political party out of all the London borough councils.

== History ==
Tower Hamlets First was established by Lutfur Rahman on 18 September 2013. The party stood candidates in the 2014 Tower Hamlets Council election, where it won 18 out of 45 seats, becoming the second largest party on Tower Hamlets Council, and the fifth largest political party out of all London borough councils. Rahman was first elected as an independent mayor in 2010, and then re-elected as the Tower Hamlets First candidate in 2014, before the result was overturned in 2015.

Nick Cohen in The Guardian described the party as a cult of personality surrounding Rahman. The party was suspended in 23 April 2015, after an election court report that found Rahman "personally guilty of 'corrupt or illegal practices' or both" with the party labelled as a "one-man band". The party was removed from the list of political parties maintained by the Electoral Commission on 29 April 2015.

=== Controversy ===
Tower Hamlets First faced ongoing accusations of using intimidation, fraud and bribery to gain votes and having divisive policies. In April 2014, the Secretary of State for Communities and Local Government, Eric Pickles, ordered an investigation into suspected governance failure, poor financial management and fraud in Tower Hamlets. The Tower Hamlets council, led by Tower Hamlets First, launched a legal appeal to try to prevent the review but the appeal was rejected, being described as "hopeless" by a High Court judge. The subsequent investigation by the Department for Communities and Local Government carried out by PricewaterhouseCoopers, found a "culture of cronyism" but no fraud at the council. Pickles determined the council was not meeting its "Best Value duties", and sent in commissioners to run the council's grant-making system and approve any disposals of council property until March 2017.

In September 2014, the Home Secretary, Theresa May, accused the party of being socially divisive and having sectarian politics.

=== Dissolution and aftermath ===
In April 2015, following an Election Court ruling, the party was removed from the register of political parties by the Electoral Commission. It was stated that the party was not operating a responsible financial scheme and the running of the party did not follow the documentation given in the party's registration.

The finding against Lutfur Rahman was the subject of numerous controversies. In April 2015, he was said to be "personally guilty of corrupt or illegal practices, or both", and of having "breached the rules governing elections." The result of the 2014 mayoral election result was nullified, thereby requiring a new election to be held from which Rahman was banned from standing; the ban on Rahman was in effect until 2021. A council by-election in the ward of Stepney was also called.

Following the judgement of the Election Court, the Electoral Commission released a statement confirming that Tower Hamlets First had been removed from its register of political parties owing to a failure to implement the financial scheme that was submitted to the Commission upon registration of the party. Individuals previously associated, affiliated, or identified with Tower Hamlets First subsequently stood as independent candidates in this subsequent double by-election, but Labour gained both the mayoralty and the council, by an overall majority of 1.

=== Legacy ===
Following the dissolution of the party, its 17 remaining councillors continued to serve on Tower Hamlets London Borough Council. Most stayed together forming the Tower Hamlets Independent Group (THIG), which later (February 2018) formally registered as Aspire, with Rahman still a key figure. Until the May 2018 elections, it was the largest and the main political opposition with elected councillors in the Borough. The party announced that former deputy mayor under Rahman, Cllr. Ohid Ahmed, would contest the 2018 Tower Hamlets Mayoral election against Labour's John Biggs alongside a team of 45 councillor candidates as done by Tower Hamlets First in 2014.

Several former THIG members had defected to sit as independents. A group led by Cllr. Rabina Khan formed the separate People's Alliance of Tower Hamlets group, which was formally registered as a political party on 26 February 2018.

At the 2018 local elections, Labour re-gained every council seat Tower Hamlets First had won in 2014, except for one seat won by Rabina Khan for the People's Alliance of Tower Hamlets.

== Election results ==
=== Council elections ===
Tower Hamlets First stood candidates for the first time in the 2014 election, winning 18 councillors and becoming the second largest group on the council after the Labour Party. A by-election for the ward of Stepney Green was held on 11 June 2015, after the sitting Tower Hamlets First councillor, Alibor Choudhury, was found guilty of corrupt and illegal practices by an election court. It was won by the Labour Party candidate, giving Labour overall control of the council. After the de-registration of Tower Hamlets First, its councillors continued in office as independents.

Election	Votes		Seats	Position	Role in Council
Election	No.	%	No.	Position	Role in Council
2014	28,170	30.4	18 / 45	2nd	Opposition

=== Mayoral elections ===
Incumbent Mayor Lutfur Rahman was re-elected as the Tower Hamlets First candidate in 2014, having been first elected as an independent in 2010. His victory was overturned by an election court in 2015, following allegations of electoral fraud. Lutfur Rahman was found personally guilty by the court of making false statements about a candidate, bribery, and undue spiritual influence. The court also found Rahman guilty by his agents of personation, postal vote offences, provision of false information to a registration officer, voting when not entitled, making false statements about a candidate, payment of canvassers, bribery, and undue spiritual influence.

A finding that corrupt and illegal practices for the purpose of securing Rahman's election, and that such general corruption so extensively prevailed such that it could be reasonably concluded to have affected the result was also returned. (Note: EWHC 1215 (QB) (2015) ¶ 672 & 673) As a consequence of the findings, the 2014 mayoral election was deemed void. Rahman was barred from holding elective office, voting or being registered as a voter for five years as bribery and undue influence constitute corrupt practices.

Year	Candidate	Popular vote		Position	Majority
Year	Candidate	1st pref.	2nd pref.	Position	Majority
2010	Lutfur Rahman	23,283	—N/a	1st	12,029
2014	Lutfur Rahman	36,539	37,395	1st	3,252

== See also ==
- List of Labour Party breakaway parties (UK)
