= 1993 Millwall by-election =

Local election in England

- 16 September 1993

1 of 3 seats in Millwall ward
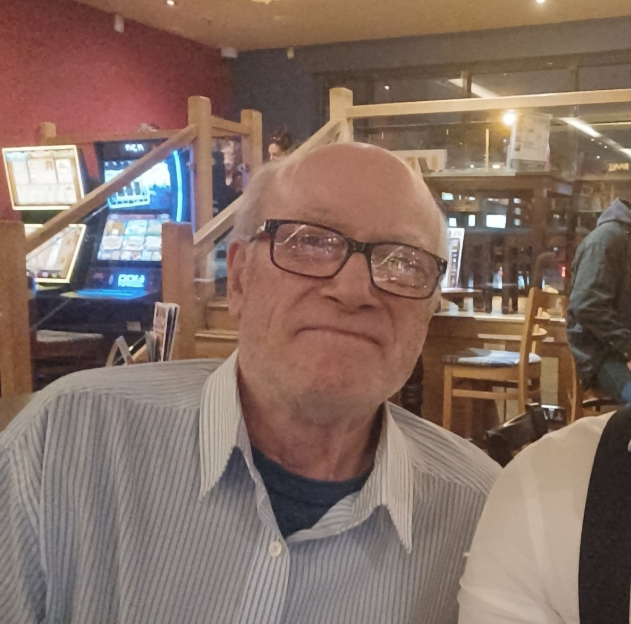
	Majority party	Minority party
		Lab
Candidate	Derek Beackon	James Hunt
Party	BNP	Labour
Popular vote	1,480	1,473
Percentage	33.8%	33.7%
Swing	New	▼11.4pp
	Third party	Fourth party
	LD	Con
Candidate	Jennifer Mills	Timothy Dickenson
Party	Liberal Democrats	Conservative
Popular vote	1,284	134
Percentage	29.4%	3.1%
Swing	▼10.6pp	▼4.4pp
- Millwall ward boundary in 1993
Councillor before election
David Chapman
Labour
Elected Councillor
Derek Beackon
BNP

The 1993 Millwall by-election was a local government by-election in the Millwall ward of the London Borough of Tower Hamlets on 16 September 1993. The result became widely publicised due to the first ever electoral success for the far-right British National Party by Derek Beackon.

== Prelude ==
Millwall is located on the Isle of Dogs in London, England. Historically, it had been an area of working class residents mainly employed in the many docks on the Isle of Dogs but the closure of the docks in the 1960s had led to high unemployment and deprivation in the area. The former Metropolitan Borough of Poplar and wider London Borough of Tower Hamlets had a long history of activity by the far-right, including previous organisations such as the British Brothers' League, the British Union of Fascists, the British League of Ex-Servicemen and the British Movement. Race tensions in the area became heightened when a boy named John Stoner was involved in an incident at Morpeth School in Bethnal Green in the East End of London with a group of Asian students. On 24 February 1990, 300 White residents participated in a protest led by John's grandfather, John Happe. Although Happe expressly condemned the BNP, around 50 BNP members attended and began to become better-known in the area. The BNP used the slogan "Rights for Whites", a slogan that had been in use since at least the protests against the Notting Hill Carnival in the 1970s. This slogan proved successful. In one occasion, a group of mothers protesting against the closure of a nursery in the Park ward began to chant "Rights for Whites" on the prompting of some BNP members at the protest. Eventually, the BNP registered on the 1993 ballot paper as "Rights for Whites - British National Party". In the years 1990-3, the BNP concentrated on door-to-door canvassing rather than on mass demonstrations, to avoid the potential for violent clashes with other protesters.

The majority of housing in the borough of Tower Hamlets was owned by the council at the time, so housing was a major issue in local politics. At the time, the Liberal Democrats had a "bottom-up" strategy for local elections, where the local party determined its own strategy with little direction from headquarters. As most of the Asian residents in Tower Hamlets supported the Labour Party, the local Liberal Democrats increasingly became the party of local White residents. Roger Eatwell has used the phrase "syncretic legitimation" to the favouring of "local people" by the Liberal Democrats that led to greater acceptance of the BNP's racism. For example, the Liberal Democrats' leaflets in Millwall had said that Labour's policies for positive discrimination meant "NO to Island Homes for Island People" (the Isle of Dogs is known locally as "the Island") and implying that the Liberal Democrats favoured the White community. In November 1981, a local Liberal Democrat councillor had travelled to Bangladesh and was quoted as telling local people that there was "no room left for immigrants". Another councillor hung a Union flag in a proscribed place from his office in Bethnal Green and made a stance of refusing to take it down. The BNP themselves said that the local Liberal Democrats had "transformed themselves from being composed of a small group of early yuppie outsiders, to being the party of the local frustrated housewife". In time, the Labour Party felt obliged to defend themselves against perceptions of favouring Bangladeshis and also began to use similar language about favouring locals.

As the governing party on the council, the Liberal Democrats had instituted a "Sons and Daughters" scheme that, by prioritising housing applications for those whose parents were already in social housing nearby, favoured White residents. Only 8% of applicants were Bangladeshi, whereas 69% of homeless people in the borough were Bangladeshi. However, the BNP criticised this scheme. In both the 1992 and 1993 local by-elections, the BNP's leaflets stated, "The Liberals' Sons and Daughters scheme is just a con - Bangladeshis are still put first in housing in Liberal Neighbourhoods like Bethnal Green and Poplar." Between the 1992 and 1993 by-elections, a new housing development on Masthouse Terrace in the Millwall ward was opened, and there was local anger that 28% of places were given to Bangladeshis. After their 1993 victory, the BNP said in a statement, "The Liberals repeated last year's shabby trick of playing the 'race card', by trying to pretend that they were against immigration. The trick failed, as local whites had heard it all before, and this time were not taken in."

=== 1990 council elections ===
In the previous full council elections in 1990, Millwall elected three Labour councillors in a marginal contest between Labour and the Liberal Democrats. The Liberal Democrats retained control of the overall council, having gained control in 1986 as the Liberal-SDP Alliance.

No BNP candidate stood for election in Millwall in 1990, although the party contested some other wards in the borough including Beackon who stood in Redcoat ward where he attracted just 3.6% of the vote.

Polling took place on 3 May 1990.

1990 Tower Hamlets London Borough Council election: Millwall
Party	Candidate	Votes	%	±%
Labour	David Chapman	1,755	45.1	+5.3
Labour	Yvonne Amor	1,689		
Labour	Ivan Walker	1,551		
Liberal Democrats	Rita Bensley	1,507	39.9	+12.7
Liberal Democrats	Jonathan Matthews	1,471		
Liberal Democrats	George Pye	1,449		
Conservative	David Hughes	294	7.5	–0.0
Conservative	Paul Ingham	284		
Green	Stephen James	279	7.5	N/A
Conservative	David Hoile	249		
Majority		44	1.2	
Labour hold		Swing		
Labour hold		Swing		
Labour hold		Swing		
Turnout			41.3	+7.5

=== 1992 general election and council by-election ===
In the 1992 general election, BNP leader John Tyndall stood in the Bow and Poplar constituency (which covered Millwall as well as other areas), gaining only 3% of the vote. Party activists in the general election believed that much of his vote had come from the Millwall area and began to focus on the area in their canvassing. The BNP candidate in the election for Bethnal Green and Stepney, Richard Edmonds, was nicknamed "The Commander" for his use of local knowledge to target Millwall as an area sympathetic to the BNP

Later in the same year, a by-election took place in Millwall, due to the resignation of Ivan Walker. A British National Party candidate stood for the council ward for the first time. They received their highest vote share of any election at the time, taking 20% of the vote. Polling took place on 1 October 1992.

1992 Millwall by-election
Party	Candidate	Votes	%	±%
Labour	Edwin Johns	1,275	38.7	–6.3
Liberal Democrats	Jonathan Matthews	1,178	35.8	–4.1
BNP	Barry Osborne	657	20.0	N/A
Conservative	Jeremy Fage	182	5.5	–1.9
Majority		97	2.9	
Labour hold		Swing		

== Campaign ==
The next year David Chapman resigned, leading to another by-election in the same ward. The British National Party's campaign emphasised 'Rights for Whites' through canvassing and leafleting, while the Labour Party campaign focussed on preventing the election of the first BNP councillor.

After a recount, Beackon was declared the winner with a majority of just 7 votes.

== Election result ==
Polling took place on 16 September 1993.

1993 Millwall by-election
Party	Candidate	Votes	%	±%
BNP	Derek Beackon	1,480	33.8	N/A
Labour	James Hunt	1,473	33.7	–11.4
Liberal Democrats	Jennifer Mills	1,284	29.4	–10.6
Conservative	Timothy Dickenson	134	3.1	–4.4
Majority		7	0.1	
BNP gain from Labour		Swing		

== Reaction ==
Party leader John Tyndall said that the result was the BNP's "moment in history" and claimed that 800 new members were recruited immediately afterwards. He later denied "hyping up" the victory.

There was widespread condemnation from politicians, religious leaders and the media of the result. Many explanations were offered to explain why the residents of Millwall would vote for a neo-Nazi party, including the manipulation of the racial issue by other local parties, the parochialism of the Isle of Dogs and the changes that the area was experiencing as many residents were in poverty but also close to the prosperity of the new Canary Wharf development. The Home Secretary at the time, Michael Howard, said that he "deplored" the outcome, with the Environment Secretary John Gummer describing the BNP as a "thoroughly nasty party". One journalist in Time Out referred to voters in the Millwall ward as "a peculiar breed: insular, proud of their docklands heritage and identity as a community, and notoriously suspicious of 'outsiders'." Copsey has argued that these analyses appear "naïve" given subsequent victories by the BNP in Blackburn, Burnley, Stoke-on-Trent and Barking and Dagenham.

Roger Eatwell included the result in an analysis of far-right successes across Europe, and formulated a three-dimensional "efficacy-legitimacy-trust" model. The model gives three main reasons why voters choose the far-right: they see an extreme force as having an efficacy for making changes; they gain legitimacy from the use of racial politics by other parties, as occurred in the prelude to the Millwall result; and they have lost trust in the established parties. Coswell criticises this model as not explaining why there was such a big increase in the BNP vote between 1992 and 1993. He points out that, despite a lack of "efficacy" from Beackon after his election, his vote still increased between 1993 and 1994, and he was only defeated because mobilisation by the Labour Party led to an exceptionally high turnout.

== Aftermath ==
Beackon gained a reputation as a poor representative after his election, often expressing ignorance about the council's debates or how the bureaucracy operated. Beackon lost his seat in the next election after a large increase in turnout increased the actual BNP vote, but increased the Labour vote further to retake the seat. The British National Party performed strongly in 1994 in general, but subsequently became divided over the behaviour of its military wing, Combat 18 - a body that Beackon was responsible for and which made up much of the local party membership in Millwall. Combat 18 began to use violence against members of the BNP who were perceived as not genuine supporters of the neo-Nazi movement, such as Eddy Butler and Tony Lecomber. The BNP would not win any elected seats again until they won three in Burnley in 2002.

Beackon did not re-stand for election until 2008 when he took 17.8% of the vote in Orsett ward on Thurrock council.

1994 Tower Hamlets London Borough Council election: Millwall
Party	Candidate	Votes	%	±%
Labour	Julia Mainwaring	3,547		
Labour	Martin Young	3,447		
Labour	Stephen Molyneaux	3,446		
BNP	Derek Beackon	2,041		
BNP	Gordon Callow	1,775		
BNP	Alan Smith	1,713		
Liberal Democrats	Jonathan Mathews	874		
Liberal Democrats	Jennifer Mills	861		
Liberal Democrats	George Pye	754		
Island Independent	James Hunt	386		
Conservative	Timothy Dickenson	322		
Conservative	Jeremy Fage	217		
Conservative	Crispin Hayhoe	210		
Independent	O.C. Osmond	124		
Turnout		10,532	66.4	
Labour gain from BNP		Swing		
Labour hold		Swing		
Labour hold		Swing		

== Bibliography ==
- Copsey, Nigel (2004). Contemporary British Fascism: The British National Party and its Quest for Legitimacy. Palgrave Macmillan. ISBN 978-1-4039-0214-6.
