= 1990 Tower Hamlets London Borough Council election =

1990 local election in England

- 3 May 1990

All 50 seats up for election to Tower Hamlets London Borough Council 26 seats needed for a majority
- Registered: 113,315
- Turnout: 52,239, 46.10%

	First party	Second party	Third party
Leader	Brenda M. Collins	Unknown	Unknown
Party	Lib Dem Focus Team	Labour	Conservative
Leader since	1988	Unknown	Unknown
Leader's seat	St Peter's	Unknown	Unknown
Seats before	26	24	0
Seats won	30	20	0
Seat change	▲4	▼4	Steady
Popular vote	57,859	59,171	6,826
Percentage	44.93%	45.95%	5.30%
Council control before election
Lib Dem Focus Team
Council control after election
Lib Dem Focus Team

Elections to Tower Hamlets London Borough Council were held on 3 May 1990. The whole council was up for election. Turnout was 42.9%.

== Election result ==
Tower Hamlets local election result 1990
Party	Seats	Gains	Losses	Net gain/loss	Seats %	Votes %	Votes	+/−
Lib Dem Focus Team	30	5	1	▲5	60.00	44.93	57,859	
Labour	20	1	5	▼4	40.00	45.95	59,171	
Conservative	0	0	0	Steady	0.00	5.30	6,826	
Green	0	0	0	Steady	0.00	1.77	2,274	
Community Campaign	0	0	0	Steady	0.00	0.82	1,061	
BNP	0	0	0	Steady	0.00	0.42	546	
Tenant's Leaseholders & Residents	0	0	0	Steady	0.00	0.41	527	
Independent Tenant	0	0	0	Steady	0.00	0.19	248	
Independent	0	0	0	0	0.00	0.15	190	
Independent Islamic	0	0	0	Steady	0.00	0.06	77	
Total	50						128,779	

== Ward results ==
(*) - Indicates an incumbent candidate

(†) - Indicates an incumbent candidate standing in a different ward

=== Blackwall ===
Blackwall (2)
Party	Candidate	Votes	%
Labour	David J. Lawrence	1,020	68.8
Labour	Christine L. Shawcroft*	1,015	68.5
Lib Dem Focus Team	Peter B. Lear	387	26.1
Lib Dem Focus Team	Peter E. Segura	365	24.6
Registered electors		4,167	
Turnout		1482	35.57
Rejected ballots		10	0.67
Labour hold			
Labour gain from Lib Dem Focus Team			

=== Bow ===
Bow (3)
Party	Candidate	Votes	%
Lib Dem Focus Team	Patricia L. Catchpole*	1,548	64.81
Lib Dem Focus Team	Ronald Lebar*	1,497	
Lib Dem Focus Team	Patricia M. Webb	1,451	
Labour	Belle Harris	860	35.19
Labour	Rory Moore	805	
Labour	Benard G. Richmond	776	
Registered electors		6,128	
Turnout		2533	41.33
Rejected ballots		7	0.28
Lib Dem Focus Team hold			
Lib Dem Focus Team hold			
Lib Dem Focus Team hold			

=== Bromley ===
Bromley (3)
Party	Candidate	Votes	%
Labour	Anne G. Delargy*	1,634	61.90
Labour	Neil J. McAree*	1,600	
Labour	William A. Downes*	1,557	
Lib Dem Focus Team	Beryl Day	956	34.73
Lib Dem Focus Team	Karen Chambers	890	
Lib Dem Focus Team	Carolyn S. Manser	843	
Conservative	Geoffrey M. Lenox-Smith	97	3.37
Conservative	Peter Sayer	77	
Registered electors		6,780	
Turnout		2833	41.78
Rejected ballots		8	0.28
Labour hold			
Labour hold			
Labour hold			

=== East India ===
East India (2)
Party	Candidate	Votes	%
Lib Dem Focus Team	Nigel P. Huxted	1,166	57.83
Lib Dem Focus Team	Gwendoline A. Lee	1,160	
Labour	Patrick J. Little	850	42.17
Labour	Stephen J. Beckett	845	
Registered electors		4,894	
Turnout		2225	45.46
Rejected ballots		9	0.40
Lib Dem Focus Team gain from Labour			
Lib Dem Focus Team gain from Labour			

=== Grove ===
Grove (2)
Party	Candidate	Votes	%
Lib Dem Focus Team	Eric Flounders*	1,169	59.91
Lib Dem Focus Team	Janet I. Ludlow*	1,159	
Labour	William E. Wakefield	637	31.96
Labour	Emmanuel D. Penner	604	
Green	Stephen Petter	102	5.25
Conservative	Barbara J. Perrott	61	2.88
Conservative	Linda M. Ransom	51	
Registered electors		3,792	
Turnout		1988	52.43
Rejected ballots		5	0.25
Lib Dem Focus Team hold			
Lib Dem Focus Team hold			

=== Holy Trinity ===
Holy Trinity (3)
Party	Candidate	Votes	%
Lib Dem Focus Team	John P. Nudds*	1,965	55.71
Lib Dem Focus Team	Jonathon S. Stokes	1,909	
Lib Dem Focus Team	Akikur Rahman	1,688	
Labour	Edward W.J. Caunter	975	28.91
Labour	Sunahwar Ali	958	
Labour	Rosemary J. Maher	954	
BNP	Stephen L. Smith	290	8.71
Green	Christine E. Law	222	6.67
Registered electors		6,613	
Turnout		3302	49.93
Rejected ballots		14	0.42
Lib Dem Focus Team hold			
Lib Dem Focus Team hold			
Lib Dem Focus Team hold			

=== Lansbury ===
Lansbury (3)
Party	Candidate	Votes	%
Lib Dem Focus Team	Gwyneth A. Deakins*	1,735	59.20
Lib Dem Focus Team	Barry E. Blandford*	1,702	
Lib Dem Focus Team	Peter Hughes	1,697	
Labour	Stephen Bowen* (Note: Bowen replaced Cllr. Pauline P. Fletcher after her resignation in 1988)	1,240	38.20
Labour	Rhys Johnson	1,056	
Labour	Sally A. Witcher	1,015	
Conservative	Michael A. Tate	75	2.60
Registered electors		6,374	
Turnout		3158	49.55
Rejected ballots		8	0.25
Lib Dem Focus Team hold			
Lib Dem Focus Team hold			
Lib Dem Focus Team gain from Labour			

=== Limehouse ===
Limehouse (3)
Party	Candidate	Votes	%
Lib Dem Focus Team	David S.E. Lewis*	1,655	58.97
Lib Dem Focus Team	Maurice Caplan	1,652	
Lib Dem Focus Team	Stewart G. Rayment*	1,625	
Labour	Dennis Twomey	1,033	36.37
Labour	Khan A. Murshid	1,005	
Labour	Patrick Seery	1,004	
Green	Alexander B. Hopwood	130	4.66
Registered electors		6,110	
Turnout		2946	48.22
Rejected ballots		15	0.51
Lib Dem Focus Team hold			
Lib Dem Focus Team hold			
Lib Dem Focus Team hold			

=== Millwall ===
Millwall (3)
Party	Candidate	Votes	%
Labour	David J. Chapman	1,755	45.05
Labour	Yvonne Amor	1,689	
Labour	Ivan F. Walker	1,551	
Lib Dem Focus Team	Rita J. Bensley	1,507	39.93
Lib Dem Focus Team	Jonathan P. Mathews	1,471	
Lib Dem Focus Team	George G. Pye	1,449	
Conservative	David C. Hughes	294	7.47
Conservative	Paul W.E. Ingham	284	
Green	Stephen G. James	279	7.55
Conservative	David C. Hoile	249	
Registered electors		9,203	
Turnout		3804	41.33
Rejected ballots		9	0.24
Labour hold			
Labour hold			
Labour hold			

=== Park ===
Park (2)
Party	Candidate	Votes	%
Lib Dem Focus Team	Margaret R. Atkins	1,434	62.60
Lib Dem Focus Team	Gyles R. Glover	1,387	
Labour	Philip N. Royal	747	32.65
Labour	Jonathan A.C. Sterne	725	
Green	Michael M.R.C. Foreman	59	2.62
Conservative	John S. Livingstone	46	2.13
Conservative	David Ransom	39	
Registered electors		4,290	
Turnout		2326	54.22
Rejected ballots		8	0.34
Lib Dem Focus Team hold			
Lib Dem Focus Team hold			

=== Redcoat ===
Redcoat (2)
Party	Candidate	Votes	%
Lib Dem Focus Team	Christopher C. Birt*	1,606	60.75
Lib Dem Focus Team	Ludlow J. Smith*	1,558	
Labour	Ashek Ali	714	26.15
Labour	Chuen F. Lam	647	
Tenants, Leaseholders & Residents	Peter Gibson	106	4.00
Tenants, Leaseholders & Residents	James Langan	102	
Independent	Abdul M. Khan	99	3.80
BNP	Derek W. Beackon	93	3.57
Conservative	James T. Lucy	51	1.73
Conservative	Zlata Peacock	39	
Registered electors		4,937	
Turnout		2672	54.12
Rejected ballots		16	0.60
Lib Dem Focus Team hold			
Lib Dem Focus Team hold			

=== St Dunstan's ===
St Dunstan's (3)
Party	Candidate	Votes	%
Labour	John R. Biggs^{†} (Note: Biggs was a sitting councillor representing the St Katharine's ward)	1,733	60.71
Labour	Derek J. Gadd	1,630	
Labour	Shahab U. Ahmed	1,628	
Lib Dem Focus Team	Terence J.B. Cowley	808	27.14
Lib Dem Focus Team	Christine M. McNair	751	
Lib Dem Focus Team	James S. Randall	673	
Green	Derek England	190	6.93
Conservative	Robert J. Ingram	163	5.22
Conservative	Sarah-Jane Quinlan	138	
Conservative	Matthew Martyn	129	
Registered electors		6,421	
Turnout		2943	45.83
Rejected ballots		9	0.31
Labour hold			
Labour hold			
Labour hold			

=== St James' ===
St James' (2)
Party	Candidate	Votes	%
Lib Dem Focus Team	Albert J. Snooks	1,318	54.47
Lib Dem Focus Team	Jennifer S. Mitchell	1,304	
Labour	Albert C. Jacob*	888	35.44
Labour	Oona Hickson	818	
Green	Paul Costas	107	4.44
BNP	David Ettridge	93	3.86
Conservative	Lillian K.F. Ingram	45	1.79
Conservative	Adrian C. Thompson	40	
Registered electors		4,735	
Turnout		2439	51.51
Rejected ballots		8	0.33
Lib Dem Focus Team hold			
Lib Dem Focus Team gain from Labour			

=== St Katharine's ===
St Katharine's (3)
Party	Candidate	Votes	%
Labour	Abdul Asad	2,028	53.01
Labour	Rajan U. Jalal	1,951	
Labour	Shirazul Islam	1,931	
Conservative	Richard W.J. Currie	850	20.61
Conservative	Nicola J. Dunsford	846	
Green	John Southworth	681	18.33
Conservative	Abdul Hamid	601	
Community Campaign	Ashfaque U. Ahmed	301	8.05
Community Campaign	Muhammed Anas	297	
Registered electors		8,987	
Turnout		3719	41.38
Rejected ballots		27	0.73
Labour hold			
Labour hold			
Labour hold			

=== St Mary's ===
St Mary's (2)
Party	Candidate	Votes	%
Lib Dem Focus Team	Ronald W. Osborne	604	35.11
Lib Dem Focus Team	Justine S. Ward	596	
Labour	Barnett Saunders*	592	34.52
Labour	Julia Mainwaring	588	
Community Campaign	Shah M. Haque	219	12.81
Tenants, Leaseholders & Residents	Emmanuel Parris	174	9.36
Tenants, Leaseholders & Residents	Raymond J. Warner	145	
Independent	Abu H.M.E. Hassain	91	5.33
Conservative	Mohammed A.S. Khan	58	2.87
Conservative	Andrew M. Smith	39	
Registered electors		3,632	
Turnout		1658	45.65
Rejected ballots		24	1.45
Lib Dem Focus Team gain from Labour			
Lib Dem Focus Team gain from Labour			

=== St Peter's ===
St Peter's (3)
Party	Candidate	Votes	%
Lib Dem Focus Team	Brenda M. Collins*	2,089	57.70
Lib Dem Focus Team	Abdul Rohim	1,981	
Lib Dem Focus Team	Betty Wright	1,933	
Labour	Fanu Miah	1,232	33.97
Labour	Amanda M. Owen	1,202	
Labour	Terence D. Penton	1,101	
Green	Harvey Gilbert	289	8.33
Registered electors		7,340	
Turnout		3542	48.26
Rejected ballots		17	0.48
Lib Dem Focus Team hold			
Lib Dem Focus Team hold			
Lib Dem Focus Team hold			

=== Shadwell ===
Shadwell (3)
Party	Candidate	Votes	%
Labour	Albert R. Lilley*	1,679	74.76
Labour	John Riley*	1,575	
Labour	Pola M. Uddin	1,447	
Conservative	Nicholas D. Martin	574	25.24
Conservative	Isobel J.R. Taylor	507	
Conservative	Thomas M. Taylor	507	
Registered electors		6,241	
Turnout		2377	38.09
Rejected ballots		54	2.27
Labour hold			
Labour hold			
Labour hold			

=== Spitalfields ===
Spitalfields (3)
Party	Candidate	Votes	%
Labour	Philip A. Maxwell*	1,501	58.24
Labour	Ghulam Mortuza*	1,482	
Labour	Abbas Uddin*	1,451	
Conservative	Abdul Kadir	372	11.15
Conservative	Jane E. Emmerson	266	
Independent Tenant	Michael McGeorge	248	9.77
Community Campaign	Abdul M. Khan	244	9.61
Green	Edward Reddin	215	8.47
Conservative	Jennifer M. Tobin	211	
BNP	Kenneth Walsh	70	2.76
Registered electors		5,609	
Turnout		2408	42.93
Rejected ballots		12	0.50
Labour hold			
Labour hold			
Labour hold			

=== Weavers ===
Weavers (3)
Party	Candidate	Votes	%
Lib Dem Focus Team	Jeremy A. Shaw*	2,504	65.14
Lib Dem Focus Team	Sajjad Miah	2,335	
Lib Dem Focus Team	Kofi B. Appiah*	2,332	
Labour	Sirajul Islam	1,177	31.29
Labour	Jil Cove	1,145	
Labour	Donald E. Hoyle	1,121	
Independent Islamic	Mohammed A. Rakib	77	2.10
Conservative	Shundor M. Ali	66	1.47
Conservative	Shelim Uddin	41	
Registered electors		7,062	
Turnout		3884	55.00
Rejected ballots		20	0.52
Lib Dem Focus Team hold			
Lib Dem Focus Team hold			
Lib Dem Focus Team hold			
