= Ayesha's Rainbow =

2006 novel by Rabina Khan

- Author: Rabina Khan
- Illustrator: Malik Al Nasir
- Cover artist: Abdul Azim
- Language: English, Bengali
- Genre: Children's literature, fiction
- Publisher: Fore-Word Press
- Publication date: 15 September 2006
- Publication place: United Kingdom
- Media type: Print
- Pages: 404
- ISBN: 978-0954886721

Ayesha's Rainbow is a 2006 children's novel written by Rabina Khan about a young Bangladeshi girl who befriends an elderly white neighbour despite escalating racism around them.

== Plot summary ==
The Bangladeshi Ali family move next door to the elderly, white Mrs. Peters in London's East End. They have purchased a flat that belonged to Mrs. Peters' recently deceased friend Vera. Mrs. Peters has lived in the East End all her life; she is lonely and averse to change, especially towards accepting people of a different culture. Mrs. Peters is feeling more lonely of late but cannot bring herself to greet her new neighbours, as she has never been on friendly terms with anyone who is not white. The Alis have had negative experiences in the past with white neighbours.

The Alis seven-year-old daughter, Ayesha, recognises a faint hint of a smile from Mrs. Peters when she first moved in. Despite Mrs. Peters initial reluctance to engage in conversation, Ayesha wins her over, and an unlikely friendship develops between them. It is through Ayesha that the two families learn about each other so that various myths are understood and they realise they share many common views when Mrs. Peters is also on speaking terms with the rest of the Ali family, which brings their two contrasting families together, crossing religious, cultural and racial barriers.

In the Ali family there is Yusuf, the oldest son, on his way to being a doctor, Hamzra, who plans to make a lot of money from the stock exchange when he starts work, and Shazia, Ayesha's combative older sister. Mrs Peters also has had four children, now into their Middle Ages: Vivien, Susan, David, and Graham. Mrs Peters is keen to flaunt her new friends to Vivien, as she has the most liberal outlook on life, and also has a passion for world travel. Susan and David are unsure what to make of their mother's new neighbours, but her youngest son, Graham, is interested in joining a racist political party and has little doubts about his views, which are very reactionary and which have also never been discouraged by his mother – until now. The Peters family are divided in their approach to their mother's new friends.

When Mrs. Peters is attacked in her home, a chain of emotions unfolds, affecting both families and the rest of the community.

== Themes ==
Ayesha's Rainbow explores the friendship which blooms between a young Bangladeshi girl and her white elderly neighbour, and the racism, prejudice and stereotyping that young Muslims experience in Britain. The story is partly autobiographical, based on Khan's own experiences growing up in Britain in the 1980s and 1990s and as a Community Safety Officer in East London's Isle of Dogs, during a time when racist right wing candidate, Derek Beackon, was elected as a councillor in September 1993.

== Release ==
Khan originally self-published Ayesha's Rainbow through Authorsonline. It was later launched by Fore-Word Press at Borders in Oxford Street, London in an event hosted by broadcast journalist Rageh Omaar on 15 September 2006.

== Critical response ==
Angela Saini of BBC News said of Ayesha's Rainbow, it "uncovers the gritty reality of a child growing up in the face of prejudice." Charlotte Kemp of The National called it "a compelling read". Anila Baig of The Sun described it as "Part moving, part shocking..." Emdad Rahman of Euro Bangla said of the novel, "The content itself is a roller-coaster ride of emotions."

Rageh Omaar said the novel "surprises educates and engrosses the reader." Roberta Taylor said, "A book like this, telling life from the inside needs to be written." Kevin Patrick Mahoney of Authortrek rated it 6/10 and said, "...if you're looking for an upfront and forthright companion to Brick Lane, then you cannot go far wrong by reading Rainbow Hands."

== See also ==
- British Bangladeshi
- Islam in the United Kingdom
- Stereotypes of South Asians
