= Rabina Khan =

British writer and politician (born 1972)

Cllr Rabina Khan
- রবিনা খান

Leader of the People's Alliance of Tower Hamlets
- In office November 2016 – August 2018

Tower Hamlets London Borough Councillor for Shadwell ward
- Incumbent
- Assumed office 11 May 2026
- Preceded by: Ana Miah
- In office 6 May 2010 – 9 May 2022
- Preceded by: Mohammed Rashid
- Succeeded by: Ana Miah

Personal details
- Born: 15 September 1972 (age 53) Sylhet District, Bangladesh
- Party: Liberal Democrats (2018–present)
- Other political affiliations: Labour (until 2010); Independent (2010–2014); Tower Hamlets First (2014–2015); Independent (2015); Tower Hamlets Independent Group (2015–2016); People's Alliance of Tower Hamlets (2016–2018)
- Spouse: Aminur Rashid Khan (m. 1992)
- Children: 3
- Occupation: Writer, novelist, film producer, creative consultant, playwright, community worker
- Profession: Politician
- Website: rabina4mayor.com

Rabina Khan (Bengali: রবিনা খান; born 15 September 1972) is a British writer, politician, former Cabinet Member for Housing and current councillor for Shadwell in Tower Hamlets Council, community worker and author of Ayesha's Rainbow. In 2015, she unsuccessfully contested the Tower Hamlets Mayoral Election. She was the leader of the People's Alliance of Tower Hamlets, but joined the Liberal Democrats on 29 August 2018.

== Early life ==
Khan's father worked as a machine operator at Chatham Dockyards in Kent; he returned to Bangladesh to get married. Khan was born in Sylhet District, Bangladesh, and moved to England with her mother at the age of three. Khan grew up in Rochester, Kent. She is the eldest of five siblings, comprising one brother and three sisters.

In 1992, at the age of 19, after completing her A-levels, Khan had an arranged marriage with trainee teacher Aminur Rashid Khan (born 1968), and moved to Tower Hamlets, London. At around the age of 22, Khan began wearing a hijab.

== Community work ==
In 1991, Khan's first job was securing work experience placements for secondary school pupils. Khan has since worked as a community regeneration worker in the Isle of Dogs, Tower Hamlets. She has worked for Tower Hamlets Council in the social and education sectors, and for government regeneration initiatives such as Bethnal Green City Challenge managing education and empowerment projects for women and young girls from ethnic minority communities. She has also been involved in community initiatives in Tower Hamlets.

In October 2012, Khan contributed on BBC Radio 4's Four Thought in a discussion about "redefining multiculturalism".

== Writing career ==
In 2003, Khan's first novel Rainbow Hands was published. This was followed by a short story If Birds Could Fly, which was published in Channel 4's TN4 Magazine. In September 2006, her second novel Ayesha's Rainbow was published. Ayesha's Rainbow is a children's novel, which tells the story of a seven-year-old Bangladeshi girl growing up in London's East End who befriends an elderly white neighbour. The story explores racism, prejudice and stereotyping that young Muslims experience in Britain. It is partly autobiographical, based on Khan's own experiences growing up in Britain in the 1980s and 1990s, and working as a community safety officer in the Isle of Dogs when British National Party candidate, Derek Beackon, was elected as a councillor in September 1993.

Khan was awarded a place on the Royal Literary Fund Mentoring Scheme and asked to take part in the 2004 and 2005 Spitafields Women's Literary Festival.

In June 2005, Khan co-founded Monsoon Press with Rekha Waheed.

She has also been involved in editing the anthologies Silent Voices and Behind the Hijab. From January 2006 to January 2008, Khan was writer in residence at Central Foundation Girls' School, where she developed 'Exploring the Unthinkable', a project that explored equalities and diversity issues using creative writing and the arts.

Khan has worked as a freelance creative consultant for the BBC, ITV, Rich Mix Cultural Foundation and the Wellcome Trust. She has contributed to BBC Asian Network. In 2006, Khan featured in and was a script advisor for the Foreign and Commonwealth Office's documentary Young, British and Muslim.

In January 2007, Khan founded television production company, Silsila Productions. Since 2007, she has been a Creative Director at Silsila Productions. In 2007, she also wrote the play Shilpa and Jade for the Wellcome Trust Pulse Project. In 2009, she wrote the screenplay Shahid and Annika. She wrote and produced two short films: The Good Wife, sponsored by Sixteen Films, and Shrouded, commissioned by London Met Services.

In May 2021, her autobiographical non-fiction book My Hair is Pink Under This Veil was published by Biteback Publishing.

== Political career ==
In the May 2010 Tower Hamlets Council election, Khan won a seat in Shadwell for the Labour Party. In October 2010, she was suspended along with nine other councillors from the Labour Party for supporting the newly elected independent Mayor of Tower Hamlets, Lutfur Rahman. In May 2014, she was re-elected in the Shadwell ward as a candidate for Tower Hamlets First, a party set up by Rahman. She was a member of Tower Hamlets First until it was disbanded in April 2015 following electoral corruption by Rahman.

From October 2010 to April 2015, Khan was also the Cabinet Member of Housing.

In April 2015, Khan along with the remaining 17 Tower Hamlets First councillors was described by Commissioner Richard Mawrey QC, acting as a judge in an election court investigating Lutfur Rahman's election, as being elected to Tower Hamlets Council "with the benefit of the corrupt and illegal practices", although Khan was not implicated in any claims of electoral fraud. In the same month, Khan announced that she would stand in the by-election for mayor of Tower Hamlets, supported by Rahman and all the former Tower Hamlets First councillors. In May 2015, she stood as an independent candidate and came second to Labour candidate John Biggs.

Khan was subsequently re-elected as a councillor as a member of the Tower Hamlets Independent Group (THIG). In November 2016, she defected from THIG to form the People's Alliance of Tower Hamlets (PATH), which was formally recognised as a political party by the Electoral Commission in February 2018.

In May 2018, Khan stood in the elections for the directly elected Mayor of Tower Hamlets. She came second and was re-elected as a councillor, PATH's only win and the only former Tower Hamlets First seat not taken by Labour.

Khan disbanded PATH in August 2018 with her and her fellow members joining the Liberal Democrats, making her the only Liberal Democrat councillor on Tower Hamlets Council.

In the 2019 European Elections she was a candidate for the Liberal Democrats in the London region. In September 2019, she was announced as the Liberal Democrat candidate for Kensington for the 2019 United Kingdom general election. She was appointed to be the Communities Special Advisor to the Liberal Democrat Leader in the House of Lords, Lord Newby. Sam Gyimah MP, elected as a Conservative but who had defected to the LibDems, became the candidate instead; he came third in the election.

She stood in the 2022 Tower Hamlets Mayoral contest for the Liberal Democrats and for reelection to her Shadwell seat. She lost both. However, her mayoral candidacy helped the Liberal Democrats supplant the Conservatives for the first time in the borough's mayoral vote. She stood in the 2026 Tower Hamlets London Borough Council election, where she won back the seat she held previously in Shadwell. Her seat was the only seat in Tower Hamlets that was a gain from the governing Aspire party.

== Awards and nominations ==
Khan has been awarded a Tower Hamlets Civic Award. In 2010, she was short listed for the European Muslim Women of Influence Award. In October 2014, she was named 'hero of the year' in the European Diversity awards for her engagement in the East End and wider society.

== Personal life ==
Khan is a Muslim and speaks Bengali. She lives in Whitechapel, London with her husband, Aminur, three children, and mother-in-law. In 2009, Khan's father died.

== Novels ==
Year	Title	Credit	Publisher	ISBN
2003	Rainbow Hands	Author	Authors Online	978-0755200887
2003	If Birds Could Fly	Author	TN4 Magazine	
2006	Ayesha's Rainbow	Author	Fore-Word Press	978-0954886721
2007	Silent Voices	Editor	Monsoon Press	978-0955726705
2009	Behind the Hijab	Editor	Monsoon Press	978-0955726712

== See also ==
- British Bangladeshi
- List of British Bangladeshis
- List of English writers
- List of Muslim writers and poets
- List of ethnic minority politicians in the United Kingdom

Party political offices
New title	Leader of the People's Alliance of Tower Hamlets; 2018	Succeeded by Position abolished
