= Weavers (ward) =

Electoral ward in London, England

- Electoral ward for the Tower Hamlets London Borough Council
- Weavers ward boundaries since 2014
- Borough: Tower Hamlets
- County: Greater London
- Population: 13,339 (2021)
- Electorate: 9,221 (2022)
- Area: 0.6822 square kilometres (0.2634 sq mi)

Current electoral ward
- Created: 1978
- Councillors: 1978–2014: 3; 2014–present: 2
- ONS code: 00BGGM (2002–2014)
- GSS code: E05000588 (2002–2014); E05009335 (2014–present)

Weavers is an electoral ward in the London Borough of Tower Hamlets. The ward was first used in the 1978 elections. It returns councillors to Tower Hamlets London Borough Council.

== Tower Hamlets council elections since 2014 ==
There was a revision of ward boundaries in Tower Hamlets in 2014.

=== 2022 election ===
The election took place on 5 May 2022.

2022 Tower Hamlets London Borough Council election: Weavers (2)
Party	Candidate	Votes	%	±%
Aspire	Kabir Ahmed	1,649	43.54	+29.37
Labour Co-op	Asma Islam	1,417	37.42	−11.18
Aspire	Fazleh Elaahi	1,224	32.32	+17.71
Labour Co-op	Kevin McKenna	1,135	29.97	−11.59
Green	Katy Guttmann	395	10.43	+1.05
Conservative	Elliot Weaver	237	6.26	+0.94
Green	Benjamin Hancocks	225	5.94	−2.72
Liberal Democrats	John Adam	203	5.36	+1.55
Liberal Democrats	Ed Long	150	3.96	−3.33
TUSC	Hugo Pierre	110	2.90	N/A
Conservative	Moulay Essaydi	106	2.80	−3.23
Rejected ballots		33		
Turnout		3,787	41.07	+0.36
Registered electors		9,221		
Aspire gain from Labour		Swing		
Labour hold		Swing		

=== 2018 election ===
The election took place on 3 May 2018.

2018 Tower Hamlets London Borough Council election: Weavers (2)
Party	Candidate	Votes	%	±%
Labour	Abdul Mukit	1,773	48.60	+17.81
Labour	John Pierce	1,516	41.56	+11.11
Aspire	Mohammed Elaahi	533	14.61	N/A
Aspire	Mohammed Hussain	517	14.17	N/A
Green	Andrew Fernandez	342	9.38	−4.49
Green	Chris Smith	316	8.66	−4.46
Liberal Democrats	Ed Long	266	7.29	+2.26
PATH	Halima Shopna	231	6.33	N/A
Conservative	Philip Baldwin	220	6.03	−0.29
Conservative	Elliott Weaver	194	5.32	+0.42
Renew	Spencer Wood	154	4.22	N/A
PATH	Taj Uddin	141	3.87	N/A
Liberal Democrats	Ify Okoli	139	3.81	N/A
Rejected ballots		41		
Turnout		3,689	40.71	
Registered electors		9,062		
Labour hold		Swing		
Labour hold		Swing		

=== 2014 election ===
The election took place on 22 May 2014.

2014 Tower Hamlets London Borough Council election: Weavers (2)
Party	Candidate	Votes	%	±%
Labour	Abdul Mukit	1,237	30.79	
Labour	John Pierce	1,223	30.45	
Tower Hamlets First	Kabir Ahmed	1,214	30.22	
Tower Hamlets First	Yousuf Khan	1,128	28.08	
Green	Chris Smith	557	13.87	
Green	Maureen Childs	527	13.12	
UKIP	Pauline McQueen	316	7.87	
Conservative	Louise Taggart	254	6.32	
Liberal Democrats	Alex Dziedzan	202	5.03	
Conservative	Luke Ounsworth	197	4.90	
TUSC	Hugo Pierre	113	2.81	
Turnout		4,048	46.22	
Labour win (new boundaries)				
Labour win (new boundaries)				

== 2002–2014 Tower Hamlets council elections ==
Weavers ward boundaries from 2002 to 2014

There was a revision of ward boundaries in Tower Hamlets in 2002.

=== 2010 election ===
The election on 6 May 2010 took place on the same day as the United Kingdom general election.

2010 Tower Hamlets London Borough Council election: Weavers (3)
Party	Candidate	Votes	%	±%
Labour	Kabir Ahmed	2,082		
Labour	Anna Lynch	1,895		
Labour	Abdul Mukit	1,532		
Liberal Democrats	Philip Baker	1383		
Liberal Democrats	Sajjad Miah	1179		
Liberal Democrats	Tim O'Flaherty	1099		
Respect	Yousuf Khan	1009		
Respect	Fazlul Hoque	892		
Respect	Rob Hoveman	728		
Conservative	Akhtar Ahmed	667		
Conservative	Gias Ahmed	640		
Green	Catherine Guttman	628		
Green	Daniel Jackson	516		
Green	Ben Hancocks	496		
Conservative	Abdi Hassan	477		
Turnout			62.02	
Labour gain from Liberal Democrats		Swing		
Labour gain from Liberal Democrats		Swing		
Labour gain from Respect		Swing		

=== 2006 election ===
The election took place on 4 May 2006.

2006 Tower Hamlets London Borough Council election: Weavers (3)
Party	Candidate	Votes	%	±%
Liberal Democrats	Abdul Matin	1,819	40.7	
Liberal Democrats	Louise Alexander	1,059		
Liberal Democrats	Timothy O'Flaherty	948		
Labour	Fazlul Haque	854	19.1	
Respect	Dilwara Begum	830	18.6	
Labour	Amina Ali	652		
Labour	Nathan Oley	575		
Respect	Paul Fredericks	494		
Respect	Eliza Cox	489		
Green	Catherine Guttman	364	8.2	
Independent	Gias Ahmed	345	7.7	
Green	Daniel Jackson	321		
Green	Benjamin Hancocks	292		
Conservative	Simon Holmes	254	5.7	
Conservative	Hamida Chowdhury	249		
Conservative	Mark Walters	214		
Turnout			41.8	
Liberal Democrats hold		Swing		
Liberal Democrats hold		Swing		
Liberal Democrats hold		Swing		

=== 2002 election ===
The election took place on 2 May 2002.

2002 Tower Hamlets London Borough Council election: Weavers (3)
Party	Candidate	Votes	%	±%
Liberal Democrats	Abdul Matin	1,588		
Liberal Democrats	Louise Alexander	1,397		
Liberal Democrats	Timothy O'Flaherty	1,298		
Labour	Sirajul Islam	925		
Labour	Humaiun Kobir	919		
Labour	Eric Taylor	732		
Conservative	Mohammed Kadir	295		
Green	Benjamin Hancocks	204		
Green	Marc Weaver	184		
Green	Stephen Wood	159		
Conservative	Jane Meehan	145		
Conservative	Joanna Noles	137		
Independent	Matt Bass	51		
Turnout		8,024		
Liberal Democrats win (new boundaries)				
Liberal Democrats win (new boundaries)				
Liberal Democrats win (new boundaries)				

== 1978–2002 Tower Hamlets council elections ==
Weavers ward boundaries from 1978 to 2002

There was a revision of ward boundaries in Tower Hamlets in 1978.

=== 1998 election ===
The election took place on 7 May 1998.

1998 Tower Hamlets London Borough Council election: Weavers (3)
Party	Candidate	Votes	%	±%
Labour	Mohammed Ali	1,229		
Labour	Christopher Creegan	985		
Labour	Catherine Tuitt	922		
Liberal Democrats	Kofi Appiah	776		
Liberal	Terry Milson	770		
Liberal Democrats	Abdul Khan	748		
Liberal Democrats	Jonathan Mathews	738		
Liberal	Kathleen Caulfield	705		
Liberal	Justin Sillman	309		
Conservative	Mohammed Uddin	158		
Turnout		7,340		
Labour hold		Swing		
Labour hold		Swing		
Labour hold		Swing		

=== 1994 election ===
The election took place on 5 May 1994.

1994 Tower Hamlets London Borough Council election: Weavers (3)
Party	Candidate	Votes	%	±%
Labour	Sunahwar Ali	1,518		
Labour	V. L. Peters	1,462		
Labour	Albert Jacob	1,427		
Ind. Lib Dem	J. A. Shaw	1,224		
Ind. Lib Dem	Terry Milson	1,044		
Liberal Democrats	Kofi Appiah	937		
Ind. Lib Dem	N. Uddin	922		
Liberal Democrats	S. Miah	882		
Turnout		6,745	52.3	
Labour gain from Liberal Democrats		Swing		
Labour gain from Liberal Democrats		Swing		
Labour gain from Liberal Democrats		Swing		

=== 1990 election ===
The election took place on 3 May 1990.

1990 Tower Hamlets London Borough Council election: Weavers (3)
Party	Candidate	Votes	%	±%
Liberal Democrats	Jeremy Shaw	2,504		
Liberal Democrats	Sajjad Miah	2,335		
Liberal Democrats	Kofi Appiah	2,332		
Labour	Sirajul Islam	1,177		
Labour	Jil Cove	1,145		
Labour	Donald Hoyle	1,121		
Independent Islamic	Mohammed Rakib	77		
Conservative	Shundor Ali	66		
Conservative	Shelim Uddin	41		
Majority				
Turnout		7,062	55.0	
Liberal Democrats hold		Swing		
Liberal Democrats hold		Swing		
Liberal Democrats hold		Swing		

=== 1986 election ===
The election took place on 8 May 1986.

1986 Tower Hamlets London Borough Council election: Weavers (3)
Party	Candidate	Votes	%	±%
Liberal	Jeremy Shaw	1,645		
Liberal	Jeanette Welsh	1,530		
Liberal	Kofi Appiah	1,496		
Labour	Susan Hurley	1,336		
Labour	Mohammed Ludi	1,227		
Labour	John Onslow	1,201		
Conservative	Lillian Ingram	184		
Conservative	Linda O'Connell	146		
Majority				
Turnout		7,505	42.5	
Liberal hold		Swing		
Liberal hold		Swing		
Liberal hold		Swing		

=== 1982 election ===
The election took place on 6 May 1982.

1982 Tower Hamlets London Borough Council election: Weavers (3)
Party	Candidate	Votes	%	±%
Liberal	Jeremy A Shaw	1,496	54.1	
Liberal	Peter J Hughes	1,435		
Liberal	Kofi B Appiah	1,396		
Labour	Edward Bishop	754	27.3	
Labour	William Harris	664		
Labour	Sally A Tyley	612		
Conservative	Richard Dyer	267	9.7	
Independent	Mohammed A Hussain	246	8.9	
Majority			26.9	
Turnout			37.4	
Liberal gain from Labour		Swing		
Liberal gain from Labour		Swing		
Liberal gain from Labour		Swing		

=== 1978 election ===
The election took place on 4 May 1978.

1978 Tower Hamlets London Borough Council election: Weavers (3)
Party	Candidate	Votes	%	±%
Labour	Lillian Crook	748		
Labour	Charles Main	735		
Labour	Arthur Praag	690		
Liberal	Paul Robbins	573		
Liberal	Carol McLeod	555		
Liberal	Henry Stallman	510		
Conservative	Jonathan Fairhurst	231		
National Front	Roy Newman	216		
National Front	Terence Courtney	214		
National Front	Brian Gilbert	213		
Majority				
Turnout		6,609	28.5	
Labour win (new seat)				
Labour win (new seat)				
Labour win (new seat)				
