= Millwall (ward) =

- Former electoral ward for the Tower Hamlets London Borough Council
- Millwall ward boundaries from 2002 to 2014
- Borough: Tower Hamlets
- County: Greater London
- Population: 23,084 (2011)
- Electorate: 13,420 (2010)
- Major settlements: Millwall

Former electoral ward
- Created: 1978
- Abolished: 2014
- Councillors: 3
- Replaced by: Blackwall and Cubitt Town; Canary Wharf; Island Gardens; Lansbury
- GSS code: E05000583 (2002–2014)

Millwall was an electoral ward in the London Borough of Tower Hamlets from 1978 to 2014. The ward was first used in the 1978 elections and last used for the 2010 elections. It returned councillors to Tower Hamlets London Borough Council. The ward is known for the 1993 Millwall by-election when the first British National Party councillor was elected.

== 2002–2014 Tower Hamlets council elections ==
There was a revision of ward boundaries in Tower Hamlets in 2014.

=== 2010 election ===
The election on 6 May 2010 took place on the same day as the United Kingdom general election.

2010 Tower Hamlets London Borough Council election: Millwall
| Party | Candidate | Votes | % | ±% |
|---|---|---|---|---|
| Conservative | Zara Davis | 2,959 | 37.2 | |
| Conservative | David Snowdon | 2,693 | 33.8 | |
| Conservative | Maium Miah | 2,519 | 31.6 | |
| Labour | John Cray | 2,180 | 27.4 | |
| Labour | Doros Ullah | 1,943 | 24.4 | |
| Labour | Garry Wykes | 1,664 | 20.9 | |
| Liberal Democrats | John Denniston | 1,362 | 17.1 | |
| Liberal Democrats | Iain Porter | 1,177 | 14.8 | |
| Liberal Democrats | George McFarlane | 1,099 | 13.8 | |
| Respect | Shiuly Begum | 668 | 8.4 | |
| Respect | Muzibul Islam | 498 | 6.3 | |
| BNP | Dave Anderson | 358 | 4.5 | |
| Respect | Kevin Ovenden | 277 | 3.5 | |
| Turnout | | 7,960 | 52.96 | |
| Conservative hold | | Swing | | |
| Conservative hold | | Swing | | |
| Conservative hold | | Swing | | |

=== 2008 by-election ===
The by-election took place on 1 May 2008, following the resignation of Simon Rouse.

2008 Millwall by-election
| Party | Candidate | Votes | % | ±% |
|---|---|---|---|---|
| Conservative | David Snowdon | 2,133 | 48.5 | +4.7 |
| Labour | Doros Ullah | 1,421 | 32.3 | +0.6 |
| Liberal Democrats | Mohammed Uddin | 370 | 8.4 | −0.7 |
| BNP | Jeffrey Marshall | 219 | 5.0 | +5.0 |
| Respect | Reza Mahbob | 170 | 3.9 | −11.5 |
| Left List | Rebecaa Townesend | 83 | 1.9 | +1.9 |
| Majority | | 712 | 16.2 | |
| Turnout | | 4,396 | 38.6 | |
| Conservative hold | | Swing | | |

=== 2006 election ===
The election took place on 4 May 2006.

2006 Tower Hamlets London Borough Council election: Millwall
| Party | Candidate | Votes | % | ±% |
|---|---|---|---|---|
| Conservative | Simon Rouse | 1,724 | 43.8 | |
| Conservative | Shirley Houghton | 1,685 | | |
| Conservative | Rupert Eckhardt | 1,679 | | |
| Labour | Alan Amos | 1,248 | 31.7 | |
| Labour | John Cray | 1,128 | | |
| Labour | Arip Miah | 1,084 | | |
| Respect | Mohammed Alam-Raja | 606 | 15.4 | |
| Respect | Sybil Cock | 398 | | |
| Liberal Democrats | Patricia Ramsay | 358 | 9.1 | |
| Respect | Julia Taher | 312 | | |
| Liberal Democrats | Nigel Huxted | 301 | | |
| Liberal Democrats | Ian McDonald | 300 | | |
| Turnout | | | 32.3 | |
| Conservative hold | | Swing | | |
| Conservative gain from Labour | | Swing | | |
| Conservative gain from Labour | | Swing | | |

=== 2004 by-election ===
The by-election took place on 9 September 2004, following the resignation of Mumtaz Samad.

2004 Millwall by-election
| Party | Candidate | Votes | % | ±% |
|---|---|---|---|---|
| Conservative | Simon Rouse | 828 | 34.8 | +15.0 |
| Respect | Paul McGarr | 635 | 26.7 | +26.7 |
| Labour | John Cray | 571 | 24.0 | −24.4 |
| Independent | Andrew Sweeney | 195 | 8.2 | +8.2 |
| Liberal Democrats | Barry Blandford | 150 | 6.3 | −7.6 |
| Majority | | 193 | 8.1 | |
| Turnout | | 2,379 | 23.2 | |
| Conservative gain from Labour | | Swing | | |

=== 2002 election ===
The election took place on 2 May 2002.

2002 Tower Hamlets London Borough Council election: Millwall
| Party | Candidate | Votes | % | ±% |
|---|---|---|---|---|
| Labour | Alan Amos | 1,089 | 48.00 | |
| Labour | Betheline Chattopadhyay | 986 | | |
| Labour | Mumtaz Samad | 970 | | |
| Conservative | Philip Groves | 446 | 20.30 | |
| Conservative | Paul Ingham | 422 | | |
| Conservative | Alison Newton | 420 | | |
| Liberal Democrats | Malcolm Cuthbert | 313 | 12.59 | |
| Liberal Democrats | Jean Stokes | 245 | | |
| Liberal Democrats | Ian McDonald | 241 | | |
| BNP | Gordon Callow | 204 | 9.65 | |
| London Socialist | Susan Gibson | 200 | 9.46 | |
| Registered electors | | 9,302 | | |
| Turnout | | 2,045 | 21.98 | |
| Rejected ballots | | 7 | 0.34 | |
| Labour win (new boundaries) | | | | |
| Labour win (new boundaries) | | | | |
| Labour win (new boundaries) | | | | |

== 1978–2002 Tower Hamlets council elections ==
Millwall ward boundaries from 1978 to 2002

=== 1998 election ===
The election on 7 May 1998 took place on the same day as the 1998 Greater London Authority referendum.

1998 Tower Hamlets London Borough Council election: Millwall
| Party | Candidate | Votes | % | ±% |
|---|---|---|---|---|
| Labour | Julia Mainwaring | 2,315 | 61.18 | ▲10.84 |
| Labour | Martin Young | 2,315 | | |
| Labour | Stephen Molyneaux | 2,279 | | |
| BNP | David Hill | 665 | 16.89 | ▼9.77 |
| BNP | Gordon Callow | 637 | | |
| BNP | Steven Harrington | 606 | | |
| Conservative | Philip Groves | 495 | 12.86 | ▲9.24 |
| Conservative | Jennifer Kendall-Tobias | 489 | | |
| Conservative | William Norton | 468 | | |
| Liberal Democrats | Richard Flowers | 371 | 9.07 | ▼2.94 |
| Liberal Democrats | Alexander Wilcock | 335 | | |
| Liberal Democrats | Linda Hunn | 318 | | |
| Registered electors | | 12,191 | | ▲1,659 |
| Turnout | | 4,130 | 33.88 | ▼32.62 |
| Rejected ballots | | 21 | 0.51 | ▲0.35 |
| Labour hold | | | | |
| Labour hold | | | | |
| Labour hold | | | | |

=== 1994 election ===
The election took place on 5 May 1994.

1994 Tower Hamlets London Borough Council election: Millwall
| Party | Candidate | Votes | % | ±% |
|---|---|---|---|---|
| Labour | Julia Mainwaring | 3,547 | 50.34 | ▲5.29 |
| Labour | Martin Young | 3,447 | | |
| Labour | Stephen Molyneaux | 3,446 | | |
| BNP | Derek Beackon | 2,041 | 26.66 | New |
| BNP | Gordon Callow | 1,775 | | |
| BNP | Alan Smith | 1,713 | | |
| Liberal Democrats | Jonathan Mathews | 874 | 12.01 | ▼27.92 |
| Liberal Democrats | Jennifer Mills | 861 | | |
| Liberal Democrats | George Pye | 754 | | |
| Independent | James Hunt | 386 | 5.58 | New |
| Conservative | Timothy Dickenson | 322 | 3.62 | ▼3.85 |
| Conservative | Jeremy Fage | 217 | | |
| Conservative | Crispin Hayhoe | 210 | | |
| Independent | Olwen Osmond | 124 | 1.79 | New |
| Registered electors | | 10,532 | | ▲1,329 |
| Turnout | | 7,004 | 66.50 | ▲25.17 |
| Rejected ballots | | 11 | 0.16 | ▼0.08 |
| Labour gain from BNP | | | | |
| Labour hold | | | | |
| Labour hold | | | | |

=== 1993 by-election ===
The by-election took place on 16 September 1993, following the resignation of David Chapman.

1993 Millwall by-election
| Party | Candidate | Votes | % | ±% |
|---|---|---|---|---|
| BNP | Derek Beackon | 1,480 | 33.8 | N/A |
| Labour | James Hunt | 1,473 | 33.7 | –11.4 |
| Liberal Democrats | Jennifer Mills | 1,284 | 29.4 | –10.6 |
| Conservative | Timothy Dickenson | 134 | 3.1 | –4.4 |
| Majority | | 7 | 0.1 | |
| BNP gain from Labour | | Swing | | |

=== 1992 by-election ===
The by-election took place on 1 October 1992, following the resignation of Ivan Walker.

1992 Millwall by-election
| Party | Candidate | Votes | % | ±% |
|---|---|---|---|---|
| Labour | Edwin Johns | 1,275 | 38.7 | –6.3 |
| Liberal Democrats | Jonathan Matthews | 1,178 | 35.8 | –4.1 |
| BNP | Barry Osborne | 657 | 20.0 | N/A |
| Conservative | Jeremy Fage | 182 | 5.5 | –1.9 |
| Majority | | 97 | 2.9 | |
| Labour hold | | Swing | | |

=== 1990 election ===
The election took place on 3 May 1990.

1990 Tower Hamlets London Borough Council election: Millwall
| Party | Candidate | Votes | % | ±% |
|---|---|---|---|---|
| Labour | David Chapman | 1,755 | 45.1 | +5.3 |
| Labour | Yvonne Amor | 1,689 | | |
| Labour | Ivan Walker | 1,551 | | |
| Liberal Democrats | Rita Bensley | 1,507 | 39.9 | +12.7 |
| Liberal Democrats | Jonathan Matthews | 1,471 | | |
| Liberal Democrats | George Pye | 1,449 | | |
| Conservative | David Hughes | 294 | 7.5 | –0.0 |
| Conservative | Paul Ingham | 284 | | |
| Green | Stephen James | 279 | 7.5 | N/A |
| Conservative | David Hoile | 249 | | |
| Majority | | 44 | 1.2 | |
| Labour hold | | Swing | | |
| Labour hold | | Swing | | |
| Labour hold | | Swing | | |
| Turnout | | | 41.3 | +7.5 |

=== 1986 election ===
The election took place on 8 May 1986.

1986 Tower Hamlets London Borough Council election: Millwall
| Party | Candidate | Votes | % | ±% |
|---|---|---|---|---|
| Labour | Alan Porter | 1,119 | | |
| Labour | Maria Shanahan | 1,114 | | |
| Labour | Timothy Staten | 1,013 | | |
| SDP | John Moore | 822 | | |
| SDP | Brian Kettell | 738 | | |
| Independent | Peter Wade | 702 | | |
| Independent | George Pye | 701 | | |
| Independent | William Kilgour | 687 | | |
| SDP | Arthur Praag | 664 | | |
| Conservative | Peter Holland | 204 | | |
| Majority | | | | |
| Turnout | | 8,480 | 33.8 | |
| Labour hold | | Swing | | |
| Labour hold | | Swing | | |
| Labour hold | | Swing | | |

=== 1982 election ===
The election took place on 6 May 1982.

1982 Tower Hamlets London Borough Council election: Millwall
| Party | Candidate | Votes | % | ±% |
|---|---|---|---|---|
| Labour | William Kilgour | 1,058 | | |
| Labour | Marie Shanahan | 982 | | |
| Labour | Christopher Rackley | 910 | | |
| Independent | George Pye | 625 | | |
| Independent | John Allen | 625 | | |
| Majority | | | | |
| Turnout | | | | |
| Labour hold | | Swing | | |
| Labour hold | | Swing | | |
| Labour hold | | Swing | | |

=== 1978 election ===
The election took place on 4 May 1978.

1978 Tower Hamlets London Borough Council election: Millwall
| Party | Candidate | Votes | % | ±% |
|---|---|---|---|---|
| Labour | John Allen | 1,116 | | |
| Labour | William Kilgour | 979 | | |
| Labour | William Hickin | 963 | | |
| Conservative | Kenneth Hollands | 297 | | |
| National Front | Kevin Griffin | 236 | | |
| National Front | Peter Edwards | 224 | | |
| National Front | Donald Williams | 170 | | |
| Turnout | | 7,144 | 24.4 | |
| Labour win (new seat) | | | | |
| Labour win (new seat) | | | | |
| Labour win (new seat) | | | | |
