= 1999 British National Party leadership election =

October 1999	2011 →
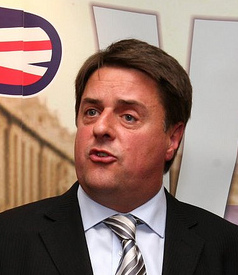
Candidate	Nick Griffin	John Tyndall
Popular vote	1,082	411
Percentage	72.5%	27.5%
Leader before election
John Tyndall
Elected Leader
Nick Griffin

The British National Party (BNP) leadership election of 1999 occurred on 28 September, and was intended to select a new leader for the BNP. It was triggered when Nick Griffin stood against John Tyndall for leadership of the party, after Tyndall had served for 17 years as leader of the party. Griffin won the election with 72.5% of the vote. The election returned a new leader of the BNP, and marked a shift in the party towards a more modern organisation, and with the intent of gaining broader appeal and legitimacy.

== Candidates ==
- Nick Griffin, editor of two magazines owned by Tyndall, Spearhead and The Rune.
- John Tyndall, Chairman of the BNP, former Chairman of the National Front.

== Results ==
British National Party leadership election, 1999
Candidate	Votes	%
Nick Griffin	1,082	72.5
John Tyndall	411	27.5

The election saw roughly 80% turnout from members eligible to vote.

== History ==
In October 1999 Nick Griffin, supported by Tony Lecomber, stood against Tyndall for leadership of the BNP. John Tyndall received just 411 votes (27.5% of the total), while Griffin received 1,082 (72.5%). After Griffin won, he began modernising the party's image, though the crucial policy change from compulsory to voluntary repatriation which had already been suggested under Tyndall's leadership. A new monthly newspaper, The Voice of Freedom, was initiated, as well as a journal, Identity.

In his 1999 leadership campaign Griffin embarked on a strategy to make the party electable by taking it away from Tyndall's extremist image. He was helped by Tyndall's lack of familiarity with the mainstream media, and in the party's September election he defeated Tyndall to become head of the BNP.
