= Shadwell (ward) =

Electoral ward in the London borough of Tower Hamlets, England

- Electoral ward for the Tower Hamlets London Borough Council
- Shadwell ward boundaries since 2014
- Borough: Tower Hamlets
- County: Greater London
- Population: 13,279 (2021)
- Electorate: 8,591 (2022)
- Area: 0.7058 square kilometres (0.2725 sq mi)

Current electoral ward
- Created: 1965
- Councillors: 1965–2014: 3; 2014–present: 2

Shadwell is an electoral ward in the London Borough of Tower Hamlets. The ward has existed since the creation of the borough on 1 April 1965 and was first used in the 1964 elections. It returns councillors to Tower Hamlets London Borough Council.

== Tower Hamlets council elections since 2014 ==
There was a revision of ward boundaries in Tower Hamlets in 2014.

=== 2022 election ===
The election took place on 5 May 2022.

2022 Tower Hamlets London Borough Council election: Shadwell (2)
Party	Candidate	Votes	%	±%
Aspire	Harun Miah	2,003	46.66	+22.32
Aspire	Ana Miah	1,486	34.61	+15.86
Liberal Democrats	Rabina Khan	1,451	33.80	−4.57
Labour	Abdus Shukur	872	20.31	−10.83
Labour	Victoria Obaze	852	19.85	−8.51
Liberal Democrats	Simon Tunnicliffe	403	9.39	+5.34
Green	Charlotte Nicholls	269	6.27	+1.34
Conservative	Daryl Stafford	169	3.94	+0.36
Conservative	Tara Hussain	124	2.89	−1.50
Rejected ballots		40		
Turnout		4,293	49.97	+0.08
Registered electors		8,591		
Aspire gain from PATH		Swing		
Aspire gain from Labour		Swing		

=== 2019 by-election ===
The by-election took place on 7 February 2019, following the resignation of Ruhul Amin.

2019 Shadwell by-election
Party	Candidate	Votes	%	±%
Aspire	Harun Miah	1,012	34.8	+13.3
Labour	Asik Rahman	914	31.5	+4.0
Liberal Democrats	Abjol Miah	484	16.7	+13.1
Conservative	Daryl Stafford	185	6.4	+2.5
Green	Tim Kiely	125	4.3	−0.1
Independent	Kazi Gous-Miah	119	4.1	−1.2
Women's Equality	Elena Scherbatykh	65	2.2	+2.2
Majority		98	3.4	
Turnout		2,904		
Aspire gain from Labour		Swing		

=== 2018 election ===
The election took place on 3 May 2018.

2018 Tower Hamlets London Borough Council election: Shadwell (2)
Party	Candidate	Votes	%	±%
PATH	Rabina Khan	1,565	38.37	−10.51
Labour	Ruhul Amin	1,270	31.14	−1.36
Labour	Charlotte Norton	1,157	28.36	+8.53
Aspire	Mohammad Harun Miah	993	24.34	−24.38
PATH	Ana Miah	765	18.75	N/A
Aspire	Bodruzzaman Shamim	439	10.76	N/A
Independent	Kazi Gous-Miah	244	5.98	N/A
Green	Ben Hyde-Hart	201	4.93	−2.94
Conservative	Des Ellerbeck	179	4.39	−3.10
Liberal Democrats	Dominic Buxton	165	4.05	+0.85
Conservative	Daryl Stafford	146	3.58	N/A
Liberal Democrats	Freda Graf	143	3.51	N/A
Green	Jonathan Page	121	2.97	N/A
Rejected ballots		73		
Turnout		4,152	49.89	
Registered electors		8,323		
PATH gain from Tower Hamlets First		Swing		
Labour gain from Tower Hamlets First		Swing		

=== 2014 election ===
The election took place on 22 May 2014.

2014 Tower Hamlets London Borough Council election: Shadwell (2)
Party	Candidate	Votes	%	±%
Tower Hamlets First	Rabina Khan	2,199	48.88	
Tower Hamlets First	Harun Miah	2,192	48.72	
Labour	Mamun Rashid	1,462	32.50	
Labour	Farhana Zaman	892	19.83	
Green	Katy Guttmann	354	7.87	
Conservative	Des Ellerbeck	337	7.49	
Liberal Democrats	Monowara Begum	144	3.20	
TUSC	Robert Williams	141	3.13	
Turnout		4,548	55.23	
Tower Hamlets First win (new boundaries)				
Tower Hamlets First win (new boundaries)				

== 2002–2014 Tower Hamlets council elections ==
Shadwell ward boundaries from 2002 to 2014

There was a revision of ward boundaries in Tower Hamlets in 2002.

=== 2010 election ===
The election on 6 May 2010 took place on the same day as the United Kingdom general election.

2010 Tower Hamlets London Borough Council election: Shadwell (3)
Party	Candidate	Votes	%	±%
Labour	Alibor Choudhury	1,915		
Respect	Harun Miah	1,628		
Labour	Rabina Khan	1,539		
Labour	John Houghton	1536		
Conservative	Khaled Khan	1251		
Respect	Mamun Rashid	1250		
Conservative	Nasima Begum	1134		
Conservative	Andrew Wood	1003		
Respect	Monjur Alam	807		
Liberal Democrats	Muhammad Alom	700		
Liberal Democrats	Jewel Choudhury	603		
Liberal Democrats	Mostaque Hussain	595		
Turnout			64.53	
Labour gain from Respect		Swing		
Respect hold		Swing		
Labour gain from Respect		Swing		

=== 2006 election ===
The election took place on 4 May 2006.

2006 Tower Hamlets London Borough Council election: Shadwell (3)
Party	Candidate	Votes	%	±%
Respect	Shamim Chowdhury	1,851	46.5	
Respect	Abjol Miah	1,789		
Respect	Mohammed Rashid	1,707		
Labour	Michael Keith	1,287		
Labour	Humayun Kabir	1,141	28.7	
Labour	Abdus Shukur	1,054		
Conservative	William Crossey	723	18.2	
Conservative	David Snowdon	670		
Conservative	Sajjadur Rahman	605		
Liberal Democrats	Catherine Buttimer	266	6.7	
Liberal Democrats	Phylis Sheehan	226		
Liberal Democrats	Mohammed Ali	205		
Turnout			46.2	
Respect gain from Labour		Swing		
Respect gain from Labour		Swing		
Respect gain from Labour		Swing		

=== 2002 election ===
The election took place on 2 May 2002.

2002 Tower Hamlets London Borough Council election: Shadwell (3)
Party	Candidate	Votes	%	±%
Labour	Manir Ahmed	1,265		
Labour	Michael Keith	1,188		
Labour	Abdus Shukur	1,076		
Liberal Democrats	Nanu Miah	512		
Conservative	William Crossey	429		
Conservative	Richard Powell	402		
Liberal Democrats	Catherine Buttimer	395		
Conservative	Maxwell Rumney	334		
Liberal Democrats	Gary Marsh	327		
Turnout		5,928		
Labour win (new seat)				
Labour win (new seat)				
Labour win (new seat)				

== 1978–2002 Tower Hamlets council elections ==
Shadwell ward boundaries from 1978 to 2002

There was a revision of ward boundaries in Tower Hamlets in 1978.

=== 1998 election ===
The election took place on 7 May 1998.

1998 Tower Hamlets London Borough Council election: Shadwell (3)
Party	Candidate	Votes	%	±%
Labour	Michael Keith	1,346		
Labour	Bodrul Alom	1,229		
Labour	Abdus Shukur	1,112		
Independent	Abdul Malik	757		
Conservative	Richard Powell	589		
Conservative	Paul Ingham	547		
Conservative	Lawrence Ailreu-Thomas	490		
Turnout		6,070		
Labour hold		Swing		
Labour hold		Swing		
Labour hold		Swing		

=== 1994 election ===
The election took place on 5 May 1994.

1994 Tower Hamlets London Borough Council election: Shadwell (3)
Party	Candidate	Votes	%	±%
Labour	A. R. Lilley	1,870		
Labour	Pola Uddin	1,652		
Labour	Abdus Shukur	1,635		
Liberal Democrats	R. F. Roberts	889		
Liberal Democrats	V. L. Ocuneff	776		
Liberal Democrats	H. Miah	730		
Independent Labour	A. Miah	523		
Conservative	Richard Powell	367		
Conservative	Paul Ingham	294		
Conservative	Iain Dale	293		
Green	D.J. Baker	261		
Turnout		6,832	50.9	
Labour hold		Swing		
Labour hold		Swing		
Labour hold		Swing		

=== 1990 election ===
The election took place on 3 May 1990.

1990 Tower Hamlets London Borough Council election: Shadwell (3)
Party	Candidate	Votes	%	±%
Labour	Albert Lilley	1,679		
Labour	John Riley	1,575		
Labour	Pola Uddin	1,447		
Conservative	Nicholas Martin	574		
Conservative	Isobel Taylor	507		
Conservative	Thomas Taylor	507		
Majority				
Turnout		6,241	38.1	
Labour hold		Swing		
Labour hold		Swing		
Labour hold		Swing		

=== 1986 election ===
The election took place on 8 May 1986.

1986 Tower Hamlets London Borough Council election: Shadwell (3)
Party	Candidate	Votes	%	±%
Labour	Albert Lilley	1,121		
Labour	Charles Mudd	1,101		
Labour	John Riley	1,057		
SDP	David Webb	881		
SDP	John Minch	868		
SDP	Geoffrey White	810		
Conservative	Ronald Mitchell	198		
Majority				
Turnout		6,265	35.7	
Labour hold		Swing		
Labour hold		Swing		
Labour hold		Swing		

=== 1982 election ===
The election took place on 6 May 1982.

1982 Tower Hamlets London Borough Council election: Shadwell (3)
Party	Candidate	Votes	%	±%
Labour	Eva Armsby	1,058		
Labour	Albert Lilley	995		
Labour	Charles Mudd	995		
Alliance	Neil Anthony	993		
Alliance	Arthur Pragg	928		
Alliance	Richard Roberts	915		
Majority				
Turnout				
Labour hold		Swing		
Labour hold		Swing		
Labour hold		Swing		

=== 1978 election ===
The election took place on 4 May 1978.

1978 Tower Hamlets London Borough Council election: Shadwell (3)
Party	Candidate	Votes	%	±%
Labour	Charles Mudd	1,101		
Labour	Eva Armsby	1,094		
Labour	Jeremiah Long	1,038		
East London People's Alliance	John Quarrell	287		
Conservative	Anthony Spiterie	266		
Conservative	Alan Minnerthey	254		
National Front	Thomas Underwood	155		
Limehouse and Ratcliffe Road Action Group	Christopher Idle	149		
Limehouse and Ratcliffe Road Action Group	John Chesshyre	146		
Communist	Albert Common	92		
Majority				
Turnout		6,059	30.9	
Labour win (new boundaries)				
Labour win (new boundaries)				
Labour win (new boundaries)				

== 1964–1978 Tower Hamlets council elections ==
=== 1974 election ===
The election took place on 2 May 1974.

1974 Tower Hamlets London Borough Council election: Shadwell (3)
Party	Candidate	Votes	%	±%
Labour	E. Armsby	916		
Labour	J. Long	824		
Labour	C. Mudd	809		
Communist	Kevin Halpin	211		
Majority				
Turnout		6,172	19.3	
Labour hold		Swing		
Labour hold		Swing		
Labour hold		Swing		

=== 1971 election ===
The election took place on 13 May 1971.

1971 Lambeth London Borough Council election: Shadwell (3)
Party	Candidate	Votes	%	±%
Labour	E. Armsby	1,228		
Labour	J. C. Lawder	1,192		
Labour	F. G. Spearing	1,190		
Communist	M. Campbell	190		
Turnout				
Labour hold		Swing		
Labour hold		Swing		
Labour hold		Swing		

=== 1968 election ===
The election took place on 9 May 1968.

1968 Tower Hamlets London Borough Council election: Shadwell (3)
Party	Candidate	Votes	%	±%
Labour	F. Spearing	540		
Labour	J. Lawder	504		
Labour	C. Mudd	503		
Communist	Kevin Halpin	176		
Independent	W. Gardener	136		
Majority				
Turnout		7,019	11.3	
Labour hold		Swing		
Labour hold		Swing		
Labour hold		Swing		

=== 1964 election ===
The election took place on 7 May 1964.

1964 Lambeth London Borough Council election: Shadwell
Party	Candidate	Votes	%	±%
Labour	R. J. Connolly	877		
Labour	F. G. Spearing	863		
Labour	R. Cockell	839		
Communist	F. Whipple	137		
Turnout				
Labour win (new seat)				
Labour win (new seat)				
Labour win (new seat)				
