= Limehouse (ward) =

Electoral ward in Tower Hamlets, England

- Electoral ward for the Tower Hamlets London Borough Council
- Limehouse ward boundaries since 2014
- Borough: Tower Hamlets
- County: Greater London
- Population: 6,553 (2021)
- Electorate: 4,668 (2022)
- Major settlements: Limehouse
- Area: 0.3907 square kilometres (0.1509 sq mi)²

Current electoral ward
- Created: 1965
- Number of members: 1965–1978: 4; 1978–2014: 3; 2022–present: 1
- Councillors: James King
- ONS code: 00BGGD (2002–2014)
- GSS code: E05000580 (2002–2014); E05009326 (since 2014)

Limehouse is an electoral ward in the London Borough of Tower Hamlets. The ward was first used in the 1964 elections. It returns one councillor to Tower Hamlets London Borough Council.

== Councillors ==
Election	Councillors
2014	Craig Aston (Conservative)
2018	James King (Labour)
2022	James King (Labour)

== Tower Hamlets council elections since 2014 ==
There was a revision of ward boundaries in Tower Hamlets in 2014. The number of councillors returned was reduced to one.

=== 2022 election ===
The election took place on 5 May 2022.

2022 Tower Hamlets London Borough Council election: Limehouse
Party	Candidate	Votes	%	±%
Labour	James King	728	40.18	+3.13
Conservative	David Garside	403	22.24	−8.28
Aspire	Atia Jorna	347	19.15	+8.99
Liberal Democrats	Warwick Danks	191	10.54	−2.46
Green	Geoffrey Juden	143	7.89	+2.15
Majority		325		
Rejected ballots		12		
Turnout		1812	39.27	−4.84
Registered electors		4,668		
Labour hold		Swing		

=== 2018 election ===
The election took place on 3 May 2018.

2018 Tower Hamlets London Borough Council election: Limehouse
Party	Candidate	Votes	%	±%
Labour	James King	755	37.05	+1.72
Conservative	David Garside	622	30.52	−7.52
Liberal Democrats	Jack Briggs	265	13.00	+7.92
Aspire	Shaheen Rashid	207	10.16	N/A
Green	Tim Kiely	117	5.74	N/A
PATH	Adam O'Connell	72	3.53	N/A
Majority		133		
Rejected ballots		28		
Turnout		2,066	44.11	
Registered electors		4,684		
Labour gain from Conservative		Swing		

=== 2014 election ===
The election took place on 22 May 2014.

2014 Tower Hamlets London Borough Council election: Limehouse
Party	Candidate	Votes	%	±%
Conservative	Craig Aston	786	38.04	
Labour	Catherine Overton	730	35.33	
Tower Hamlets First	Mashuk Ahmed	341	16.51	
Liberal Democrats	Matt Lomas	105	5.08	
UKIP	David Hyland	104	5.03	
Turnout		2,090	48.26	
Conservative win (new boundaries)				

== 2002–2014 Tower Hamlets council elections ==
Limehouse ward boundaries from 2002 to 2014

There was a revision of ward boundaries in Tower Hamlets in 2002.

=== 2010 election ===
The election on 6 May 2010 took place on the same day as the United Kingdom general election.

2010 Tower Hamlets London Borough Council election: Limehouse (3)
Party	Candidate	Votes	%	±%
Labour	Lutfa Begum	2,193	35.4	
Labour	David Edgar	1,880	30.3	
Conservative	Craig Aston	1,602	25.8	
Conservative	Graham Collins	1,525	24.6	
Respect	Dulal Uddin	1,500	24.2	
Labour	Victoria Obaze	1,488	24.0	
Respect	Hafiza Salam	1,357	21.9	
Conservative	Sakib Ershad	1,280	20.7	
Respect	Anfor Ali	1,225	19.8	
Liberal Democrats	Hafizur Rahman	782	12.6	
Liberal Democrats	Faruk Chowdhury	722	11.6	
Green	Jennifer Aaron-Foster	477	7.7	
Green	Louise Davies	473	7.6	
Liberal Democrats	Muazzam Rakol	445	7.2	
Green	Simon Earp	267	4.3	
Turnout		6,198	61.77	
Labour hold		Swing		
Labour hold		Swing		
Conservative gain from Respect		Swing		

=== 2006 election ===
The election took place on 4 May 2006.

2006 Tower Hamlets London Borough Council election: Limehouse (3)
Party	Candidate	Votes	%	±%
Labour	Mohammed Ali	1,208	27.6	
Respect	Lutfa Begum	1,099	25.1	
Respect	Dulal Uddin	1,092		
Labour	Judith Gardiner	1,017		
Labour	Ashton McGregor	960		
Conservative	Pennie Clarke	933	21.3	
Conservative	Philip Groves	886		
Respect	Martin Empson	854		
Conservative	Kenneth Mizzi	847		
Independent	Mohammed Hoque	662	15.1	
Independent	Abdul Jamal	630		
Liberal Democrats	Husheara Begum	470	10.8	
Liberal Democrats	John Bevan	382		
Liberal Democrats	Iain Chambers	324		
Turnout			43.0	
Labour hold		Swing		
Respect gain from Labour		Swing		
Respect gain from Labour		Swing		

=== 2002 election ===
The election took place on 2 May 2002.

2002 Tower Hamlets London Borough Council election: Limehouse (3)
Party	Candidate	Votes	%	±%
Labour	Ashton McGregor	1,026	46.15	▲19.80
Labour	Judith Gardiner	1,003		
Labour	Khan Murshid	917		
Liberal Democrats	Russell Neale	414	18.56	▲5.02
Liberal Democrats	Elizabeth Langley	413		
London Socialist	Mark Weeks	391	18.37	New
Conservative	Philip Briscoe	377	16.92	▲12.19
Conservative	Antonio Bello	364		
Liberal Democrats	Richard Winfield	358		
Conservative	Christopher Godfrey	339		
Registered electors		8,678		▲2,503
Turnout		2,280	26.27	▼12.69
Rejected ballots		6	0.26	▼0.86
Labour win (new boundaries)				
Labour win (new boundaries)				
Labour win (new boundaries)				

== 1978–2002 Tower Hamlets council elections ==
Limehouse ward boundaries from 1978 to 2002

There was a revision of ward boundaries in Tower Hamlets in 1978. The number of councillors returned was reduced to three.

=== 1998 election ===
The election on 7 May 1998 took place on the same day as the 1998 Greater London Authority referendum.

1998 Tower Hamlets London Borough Council election: Limehouse (3)
Party	Candidate	Votes	%	±%
Labour	Helal Abbas	928	26.35	▼32.51
Labour	David Edgar	778		
Labour	Soyful Alom	771		
Independent	William Wakefield	520	16.59	New
Liberal Democrats	Timothy McNally	443	13.54	▼20.59
Independent	Maurice Caplan	441	14.07	New
Liberal Democrats	Stewart Rayment	431		
Independent	Abu Hossain	425	13.56	New
Independent	Parvin Begum	402	12.83	New
Liberal Democrats	Martin Pantling	399		
Independent	Derek England	388	12.38	New
Conservative	Motiur Rahman	260	4.73	▲1.39
Conservative	Pamela Drew	101		
Conservative	Paul Goodman	84		
Registered electors		6,175		▲984
Turnout		2,406	38.96	▼15.73
Rejected ballots		27	1.12	▲0.42
Labour hold		Swing		
Labour hold		Swing		
Labour hold		Swing		

=== 1995 by-election ===
The by-election took place on 9 November 1995, following the resignation of John Ryan.

1995 Limehouse by-election
Party	Candidate	Votes	%	±%
Labour	William Wakefield	1,467		
Liberal Democrats	Paul Bargery	625		
BNP	Gordon Callow	147		
Conservative	David Hoile	53		
Majority		842		
Turnout		5,877	39.0	
Labour hold		Swing		

=== 1994 election ===
The election took place on 5 May 1994.

1994 Tower Hamlets London Borough Council election: Limehouse (3)
Party	Candidate	Votes	%	±%
Labour	David Edgar	1,592	58.86	▲22.49
Labour	John Ryan	1,562		
Labour	Soyful Alom	1,559		
Liberal Democrats	Maurice Caplan	989	34.13	▼24.84
Liberal Democrats	Gwendoline Lee	886		
Liberal Democrats	Stewart Rayment	858		
Conservative	Paul Goodman	109	3.34	New
Independent	Mohammed Khan	98	3.67	New
Conservative	Harry Smith	88		
Conservative	Abu Samih	71		
Registered electors		5,191		▼919
Turnout		2,839	54.69	▲6.47
Rejected ballots		20	0.70	▲0.19
Labour gain from Liberal Democrats		Swing		
Labour gain from Liberal Democrats		Swing		
Labour gain from Liberal Democrats		Swing		

=== 1990 election ===
The election took place on 3 May 1990.

Limehouse (3)
Party	Candidate	Votes	%	±%
Liberal Democrats	David Lewis	1,655	58.97	
Liberal Democrats	Maurice Caplan	1,652		
Liberal Democrats	Stewart Rayment	1,625		
Labour	Dennis Twomey	1,033	36.37	
Labour	Khan Murshid	1,005		
Labour	Patrick Seery	1,004		
Green	Alexander Hopwood	130	4.66	
Registered electors		6,110		
Turnout		2,946	48.22	
Rejected ballots		15	0.51	
Liberal Democrats hold		Swing		
Liberal Democrats hold		Swing		
Liberal Democrats hold		Swing		

=== 1986 election ===
The election took place on 8 May 1986.

1986 Tower Hamlets London Borough Council election: Limehouse (3)
Party	Candidate	Votes	%	±%
Liberal	David Lewis	1,223		
Liberal	Stewart Rayment	1,153		
Liberal	Carolyn Manser	1,147		
Labour	Dennis Twomey	1,142		
Labour	Michael Tyrrell	1,105		
Labour	Oona Hickson	1,055		
Conservative	David Hughes	147		
Conservative	Geoffrey Lenox-Smith	137		
Majority				
Turnout		7,064	38.2	
Liberal gain from Labour		Swing		
Liberal gain from Labour		Swing		
Liberal gain from Labour		Swing		

=== 1982 election ===
The election took place on 6 May 1982.

1982 Tower Hamlets London Borough Council election: Limehouse (3)
Party	Candidate	Votes	%	±%
Labour	John Riley	995		
Labour	John O'Neill	912		
Labour	Dennis Twomey	888		
Conservative	Anthony Williams	343		
Conservative	Peter Ainsworth	341		
Workers Revolutionary	Peter Chappell	122		
Turnout				
Labour hold		Swing		
Labour hold		Swing		
Labour hold		Swing		

=== 1978 election ===
The election took place on 4 May 1978.

1978 Tower Hamlets London Borough Council election: Limehouse (3)
Party	Candidate	Votes	%	±%
Labour	John Riley	1,101		
Labour	John O'Neill	1,093		
Labour	Dennis Twomey	1,003		
Conservative	Terence Poole	285		
National Front	Victor Clark	221		
National Front	John Tear	200		
National Front	Terence Rowe	191		
Communist	Anita Halpin	93		
Majority				
Turnout		7,147	24.0	
Labour win (new boundaries)				
Labour win (new boundaries)				
Labour win (new boundaries)				

== 1964–1978 Tower Hamlets council elections ==
External image
- Map showing Limehouse ward boundaries from 1965 to 1978

=== 1975 by-election ===
The by-election took place on 20 March 1975.

1975 Limehouse by-election
Party	Candidate	Votes	%	±%
Labour	John O'Neill	776		
Liberal	Maurice Caplan	289		
National Front	Frank Berry	161		
Majority		487		
Turnout		7,101	17.3	
Labour hold		Swing		

=== 1974 election ===
The election took place on 2 May 1974.

1974 Tower Hamlets London Borough Council election: Limehouse (4)
Party	Candidate	Votes	%	±%
Labour	H. Rackley	825		
Labour	J. Milrood	819		
Labour	John Riley	813		
Labour	A. Moffat	810		
Communist	M. Campbell	141		
Majority				
Turnout		6,982	14.9	
Labour hold		Swing		
Labour hold		Swing		
Labour hold		Swing		
Labour hold		Swing		

=== 1971 election ===
The election took place on 13 May 1971.

1971 Tower Hamlets London Borough Council election: Limehouse (4)
Party	Candidate	Votes	%	±%
Labour	J. Milrood	Unopposed		
Labour	A. Moffat	Unopposed		
Labour	K. O'Connor	Unopposed		
Labour	John Riley	Unopposed		
Majority				
Turnout		7,782	N/A	
Labour hold		Swing		
Labour hold		Swing		
Labour hold		Swing		
Labour hold		Swing		

=== 1968 election ===
The election took place on 9 May 1968.

1968 Tower Hamlets London Borough Council election: Limehouse (4)
Party	Candidate	Votes	%	±%
Labour	J. Milrood	Unopposed		
Labour	A. Moffat	Unopposed		
Labour	K. O'Connor	Unopposed		
Labour	John Riley	Unopposed		
Majority				
Turnout		8,200	N/A	
Labour hold		Swing		
Labour hold		Swing		
Labour hold		Swing		
Labour hold		Swing		

=== 1964 election ===
The election took place on 7 May 1964.

1964 Tower Hamlets London Borough Council election: Limehouse (4)
Party	Candidate	Votes	%	±%
Labour	C. Dimes	1,113		
Labour	J. Milrood	1,094		
Labour	K. O'Connor	1,094		
Labour	H. Rackley	1,088		
Union Movement	S. Bailey	121		
Liberal	E. Collins	116		
Conservative	E. Hiscock	104		
Conservative	E. Robson	96		
Conservative	B. Seymour	74		
Turnout				
Labour win (new seat)				
Labour win (new seat)				
Labour win (new seat)				
Labour win (new seat)				
