= Eddy Butler =

British politician (born 1962)

Edward Mark Butler (born in Bloomsbury on 13 November 1962) is a former National Elections Officer of the British National Party (BNP). He was dubbed the BNP's "elections guru" by its newspaper, Voice of Freedom, until being suspended and expelled from the party in 2010 by Nick Griffin. He then became a member of the English Democrats before becoming associated with the For Britain Movement. After Rupert Lowe's split from Reform UK and his subsequent founding of an own far-right party, Restore Britain, Butler has been seen campaigning for them.

== First BNP tenure ==
Butler was originally the Tower Hamlets organiser for the National Front but, after having been expelled from that party by Griffin, in 1986, joined the British National Party in the same year. Butler first came to prominence in the early 1990s when he was party organiser in Tower Hamlets. Whilst in charge here Butler masterminded the 'Rights for Whites' campaign, a locally based initiative that sought to highlight supposed council "bias" against the White British. The campaign, which initially presented itself as independent before linking directly to the BNP, was instrumental in building up support for the party in the area, which culminated in the election of Derek Beackon as a councillor in Millwall in 1993.

Butler's success brought him promotion within the party and he was soon appointed National Elections Officer. Whilst in this position, in 1994, he was the victim of a knife attack, allegedly carried out by members of Combat 18. C18 had had succeed the "stewards" skinhead/hooligan group of the BNP, which was tasked with "security" against antifascists and in whose founding Butler was involved in. He also became closely associated with party 'modernisers' such as Tony Lecomber, Michael Newland and others associated with The Patriot magazine. Butler left the BNP in 1996 only to rejoin in 1998. As a member of the Bloomsbury Forum, Butler was closely linked to the founders of the Freedom Party and joined that party in 2001.

== Second BNP tenure ==
Although appointed as the Freedom Party's Campaign Director, Butler subsequently returned to the BNP in 2003, again as its National Elections Officer, played a part in the party's campaigns in the 2006 local elections. In 2009, he was the party's lead candidate for the European Parliament election in the Eastern region, in which the BNP's party list achieved 6.1% of the vote. He was the party's candidate for Harlow in the 2010 General Election. and also a candidate in Barking and Dagenham in the London borough council elections, held on the same day.

On 18 June 2010, Butler announced that he would challenge the then leader, Nick Griffin, for the leadership (office of national chairman) of the BNP the following month. On 11 August 2010, it was announced that he had not obtained the 840 nominations required to trigger an election.

On 13 October 2010, Butler was expelled from the BNP, allegedly for breaching the party's code of conduct. He was denied a disciplinary tribunal on the grounds that he had less than two years' continuous membership of the party at the time of his alleged offence(s).

== English Democrats ==
On 26 November 2011, Butler joined the English Democrats. He stood for the Loughton Fairmead Ward for the 2012 Epping Forest local elections and gained 97 (12.22) votes, last out of four candidates. At the 2015 general election, he contested Harlow, which he had previously fought for the BNP, polling 115 votes (0.3%).

== Elections contested ==
UK Parliament elections

Date of election	Constituency	Party	Votes	%
2010	Harlow	BNP	1,739	4.0
2015	Harlow	English Democrats	115	0.3

European Parliament elections

Year	Region	Party	Votes	%	Results	Notes
2009	East of England	BNP	97,013	6.1	Not elected	Multi-member constituency; party list

== Trivia ==
Butler, using the alias "Edward Stow", is an active participant in speculative online discourse about the identity of Jack the Ripper. Since 2020, he has been running a YouTube channel called The House of Lechmere, where he publishes videos defending the theory that Charles Allen Lechmere, who is an ancestor of Butler’s wife, was responsible for the Whitechapel Murders.
