= 1994 Tower Hamlets London Borough Council election =

1994 local election in England

- 5 May 1994

All 50 seats up for election to Tower Hamlets London Borough Council 26 seats needed for a majority
- Registered: 112,366
- Turnout: 60,734, 54.05% (▲7.95)

	First party	Second party
Leader	John R. Biggs	Peter Hughes
Party	Labour	Liberal Democrats
Leader since	1991	1991
Leader's seat	St. Dunstans	Lansbury (lost)
Last election	20 seats, 45.95%	30 seats, 44.93%
Seats before	20	27
Seats won	43	7
Seat change	▲23	▼20
Popular vote	82,192	40,407
Percentage	55.42%	27.24%
Swing	▲9.47	▼17.69
	Third party	Fourth party
Leader	Derek W. Beackon (Note: Beackon is De Facto leader as he is the only BNP councillor before the election)	Unknown
Party	BNP	Ind. Lib Dem
Last election	0 seats, 0.42%	Did not stand
Seats before	1	2
Seats won	0	0
Seat change	▼1	▼2
Popular vote	9,337	7,538
Percentage	6.30%	5.08%
Swing	▲5.88	New
Council control before election
Liberal Democrats
Council control after election
Labour

Elections to Tower Hamlets London Borough Council were held on 5 May 1994. The whole council was up for election and the Labour party gained overall control of the council from the Liberal Democrats.

== Election result ==
Tower Hamlets local election result 1994
Party	Seats	Gains	Losses	Net gain/loss	Seats %	Votes %	Votes	+/−
Labour	43	23	0	▲23	86.0	55.42	82,192	▲9.47
Liberal Democrats	7	0	20	▼20	14.0	27.24	40,407	▼17.69
BNP	0	0	1	▼1	0.00	6.30	9,337	▲5.88
Ind. Lib Dem	0	0	2	▼2	0.00	5.08	7,538	New
Conservative	0	0	0	Steady	0.00	3.57	5,297	▼1.73
Independent Labour	0	0	0	Steady	0.00	0.91	1,356	New
Independent	0	0	0	Steady	0.00	0.74	1,094	▲0.59
Green	0	0	0	Steady	0.00	0.54	799	▼1.23
Independent Residents	0	0	0	Steady	0.00	0.20	300	New
Total	50						148,320	

== Ward results ==
(*) - Indicates an incumbent candidate

(†) - Indicates an incumbent candidate standing in a different ward

=== Blackwall ===
Blackwall (2)
Party	Candidate	Votes	%	±%
Labour	Christine Shawcroft*	1,147	70.98	▼2.05
Labour	Dennis Twomey	1,024		
Liberal Democrats	John P. Moore	321	20.92	▼6.05
Liberal Democrats	Patricia Ramsay	319		
Conservative	Pamela Drew	127	8.10	New
Conservative	Robert J. Neill	121		
Registered electors		3,132		▼1,035
Turnout		1,650	52.68	▲17.11
Rejected ballots		18	1.09	▲0.42
Labour hold				
Labour hold				

=== Bow ===
Bow (3)
Party	Candidate	Votes	%	±%
Liberal Democrats	Patricia L. Catchpole*	1,308	53.58	▼11.23
Liberal Democrats	Raymond G. Gipson	1,258		
Liberal Democrats	Patricia M. Webb*	1,187		
Labour	Bernard G. Richmond	962	40.17	▲4.98
Labour	Jonathan A.C. Sterne	935		
Labour	William E. Wakefield	918		
Conservative	Simon M. Gordon-Clark	176	6.25	New
Conservative	Ronald D. Mitchell	131		
Conservative	Jessica F.L. Phibbs	130		
Registered electors		6,126		▼2
Turnout		2,710	44.24	▲2.91
Rejected ballots		23	0.85	▲0.57
Liberal Democrats hold				
Liberal Democrats hold				
Liberal Democrats hold				

=== Bromley ===
Bromley (3)
Party	Candidate	Votes	%	±%
Labour	Arthur W. Downes*	2,040	68.44	▲6.54
Labour	Neil J. McAree*	1,998		
Labour	Carol M. Hinvest	1,967		
Liberal Democrats	Derek England	568	18.36	▼16.37
Liberal Democrats	Belinda J. Knowles	534		
Liberal Democrats	Rosemary Wood	509		
Green	David J. Cox	253	8.65	New
Conservative	Graem M. Corfield	161	4.55	▲1.18
Conservative	Lawrence Ailerv	120		
Conservative	Linda M. Ransom	118		
Registered electors		6,220		▼560
Turnout		3,099	49.82	▲8.04
Rejected ballots		17	0.55	▲0.27
Labour hold				
Labour hold				
Labour hold				

=== East India ===
East India (2)
Party	Candidate	Votes	%	±%
Labour	Stephen J. Beckett	1,310	58.08	▲15.91
Labour	Yve Amor	1,211		
Liberal Democrats	Nigel P. Huxted*	823	37.91	▼19.92
Liberal Democrats	Terence J.E. Stacy	823		
Conservative	Amanda J. Palmer	87	4.01	New
Conservative	David C. Hoile	86		
Registered electors		4,254		▼640
Turnout		2,407	56.58	▲11.12
Rejected ballots		21	0.87	▲0.47
Labour gain from Liberal Democrats				
Labour gain from Liberal Democrats				

=== Grove ===
Grove (2)
Party	Candidate	Votes	%	±%
Liberal Democrats	Janet I. Ludlow*	991	51.15	▼8.76
Liberal Democrats	Ricky C. Hunn	968		
Labour	Anthony H. Everington	777	38.62	▲6.66
Labour	Anthony J. Sharpe	702		
Green	Stephen Petter	120	6.26	▲1.01
Conservative	John S. Livingstone	94	3.97	▲1.09
Conservative	Barbara J. Perrott	58		
Registered electors		3,957		▲165
Turnout		2,028	51.25	▼1.18
Rejected ballots		9	0.44	▲0.19
Liberal Democrats hold				
Liberal Democrats hold				

=== Holy Trinity ===
Holy Trinity (3)
Party	Candidate	Votes	%	±%
Labour	Nooruddin Ahmed	1,407	34.94	▲6.03
Labour	Linda Gregory	1,398		
Labour	Joseph Ramanoop	1,258		
Liberal Democrats	Nicola K. Gale	1,039	23.77	▼31.94
Liberal Democrats	Jonathon S. Stokes*	1,002		
BNP	David M. King	786	19.48	▲10.77
BNP	Lynda Miller	743		
BNP	Edward J. McHale	737		
Liberal Democrats	Akikur Rahman*	722		
Ind. Lib Dem	John P. Nudds	680	17.55	New
Green	Richard H. Klein	165	4.26	▼2.41
Registered electors		6,267		
Turnout		3,651	58.26	
Rejected ballots		11	0.30	
Labour gain from Liberal Democrats				
Labour gain from Liberal Democrats				
Labour gain from Liberal Democrats				

=== Lansbury ===
Lansbury (3)
Party	Candidate	Votes	%	±%
Labour	Eric A. Commons	1,450	45.59	▲7.39
Labour	Diana R. Johnson	1,436		
Labour	Kevin V. Morton	1,373		
Liberal Democrats	Peter Hughes*	1,192	36.02	▼23.18
Liberal Democrats	Barry A. Blandford*	1,101		
Liberal Democrats	Paul A. Bargery	1,072		
Independent	David A. Hemingway	483	15.50	New
Conservative	James McLachlan	103	2.89	▲0.29
Conservative	David J. McCure	93		
Conservative	David Ransom	75		
Registered electors		5,771		▼603
Turnout		3,275	56.75	▲7.20
Rejected ballots		15	0.46	▲0.21
Labour gain from Liberal Democrats				
Labour gain from Liberal Democrats				
Labour gain from Liberal Democrats				

=== Limehouse ===
Limehouse (3)
Party	Candidate	Votes	%	±%
Labour	David J. Edgar	1,592	58.86	▲22.49
Labour	John P. Ryan	1,562		
Labour	Soyful Alom	1,559		
Liberal Democrats	Maurice Caplan*	989	34.13	▼24.84
Liberal Democrats	Gwendoline Lee	886		
Liberal Democrats	Stewart G. Rayment*	858		
Conservative	Paul A. Goodman	109	3.34	New
Independent	Mohammed T. Khan	98	3.67	New
Conservative	Harry C. Smith	88		
Conservative	Abu Samih	71		
Registered electors		5,191		▼919
Turnout		2,839	54.69	▲6.47
Rejected ballots		20	0.70	▲0.19
Labour gain from Liberal Democrats				
Labour gain from Liberal Democrats				
Labour gain from Liberal Democrats				

=== Millwall ===
Millwall (3)
Party	Candidate	Votes	%	±%
Labour	Julia Mainwaring	3,547	50.34	▲5.29
Labour	Martin Young	3,447		
Labour	Stephen Molyneaux	3,446		
BNP	Derek W. Beackon* (Note: Beackon replaced Cllr. David J. Chapman after their resignation in 1993)	2,041	26.66	New
BNP	Gordon Callow	1,775		
BNP	Alan Smith	1,713		
Liberal Democrats	Jonathan P. Mathews	874	12.01	▼27.92
Liberal Democrats	Jennifer E. Mills	861		
Liberal Democrats	George G. Pye	754		
Island Independent	James J. Hunt	386	5.58	New
Conservative	Timothy R. Dickenson	322	3.62	▼3.85
Conservative	Jeremy P. Fage	217		
Conservative	Crispin B.G. Hayhoe	210		
Independent	Olwen C. Osmond	124	1.79	New
Registered electors		10,532		▲1,329
Turnout		7,004	66.50	▲25.17
Rejected ballots		11	0.16	▼0.08
Labour gain from BNP				
Labour hold				
Labour hold				

=== Park ===
Park (2)
Party	Candidate	Votes	%	±%
Liberal Democrats	Elizabeth Baunton* (Note: Baunton replaced Cllr. Margaret R. Atkins after her death in 1990)	1,083	58.72	▼3.88
Liberal Democrats	Paul A. Brown	911		
Labour	Margaret A. Roe	634	36.98	▲4.33
Labour	Philip N. Royal	621		
Conservative	Victoria C. Benjamin	77	4.30	▲2.17
Conservative	Christopher Parslew	68		
Registered electors		3,865		▼425
Turnout		1,912	49.47	▼4.75
Rejected ballots		15	0.78	▲0.44
Liberal Democrats hold				
Liberal Democrats hold				

=== Redcoat ===
Redcoat (2)
Party	Candidate	Votes	%	±%
Labour	Belle Harris	1,431	57.92	▲31.77
Labour	Frederick P. Stratford	1,429		
Liberal Democrats	James Langan	1,009	38.64	▼22.11
Liberal Democrats	Timothy J. McNally	899		
Conservative	Zlata Peacock	85	3.44	▲1.71
Registered electors		4,585		▼352
Turnout		2,602	56.75	▲2.63
Rejected ballots		35	1.35	▲0.75
Labour gain from Liberal Democrats				
Labour gain from Liberal Democrats				

=== St Dunstans ===
St Dunstans (3)
Party	Candidate	Votes	%	±%
Labour	John R. Biggs*	2,213	71.73	▲11.02
Labour	Mohammed S. Uddin	1,965		
Labour	Derek J. Gadd*	1,964		
Liberal Democrats	Philip K. Wearne	601	20.03	▼7.11
Liberal Democrats	Abdul M. Khan	589		
Liberal Democrats	Lesley A. Morpurgo	552		
Independent	Mukith Miah	239	8.24	New
Registered electors		6,230		▼191
Turnout		3,251	52.18	▲6.35
Rejected ballots		57	1.75	▲1.44
Labour hold				
Labour hold				
Labour hold				

=== St James' ===
St James' (2)
Party	Candidate	Votes	%	±%
Labour	Mark E. Taylor	1,441	47.80	▲12.36
Labour	Lorraine K. Melvin	1,402		
Liberal Democrats	Albert J. Snooks*	938	30.25	▼24.22
Liberal Democrats	Jennifer S. Mitchell*	862		
BNP	Victor J. Dooley	653	21.95	▲18.09
Registered electors		4,825		▲90
Turnout		2,938	60.89	▲9.38
Rejected ballots		12	0.41	▲0.08
Labour gain from Liberal Democrats				
Labour gain from Liberal Democrats				

=== St Katharines ===
St Katharines (3)
Party	Candidate	Votes	%	±%
Labour	Abdul Asad*	2,131	45.61	▼7.40
Labour	Denise Jones	2,116		
Labour	Rajan U. Jalal*	2,020		
Liberal Democrats	David J. Goodwin	1,195	25.39	New
Liberal Democrats	Josephine Harriott	1,167		
Liberal Democrats	Afzal H.S. Miah	1,127		
Independent Labour	Ali H. Ali	537	11.72	New
Conservative	Kevin A. Bell	381	7.45	▼13.16
Conservative	Pamela A. Singleton	334		
Conservative	Adrian C. Thompson	308		
Independent Residents	Jack Isaacs	300	6.55	New
Independent	Gwendolen R. Tilly	150	3.28	New
Registered electors		9,182		▲195
Turnout		4,389	47.80	▲6.42
Rejected ballots		14	0.32	▼0.41
Labour hold				
Labour hold				
Labour hold				

=== St Mary's ===
St Mary's (2)
Party	Candidate	Votes	%	±%
Labour	Amanda Linton	1,625	66.76	▲32.24
Labour	Bodrul Alom	1,560		
Ind. Lib Dem	Robert Bowler	551	22.97	New
Ind. Lib Dem	Raymond J. Warner	545		
Liberal Democrats	Abdul Ali	141	5.91	▼29.20
Conservative	Mohammed A.S. Khan	104	4.36	▲1.49
Registered electors		4,332		▲700
Turnout		2,382	55.11	▲9.46
Rejected ballots		18	0.76	▼0.69
Labour gain from Liberal Democrats				
Labour gain from Liberal Democrats				

=== St Peter's ===
St Peter's (3)
Party	Candidate	Votes	%	±%
Labour	Philip A. Maxwell^{†} (Note: Maxwell was a sitting councillor representing Spitalfields ward)	2,092	44.85	▲10.88
Labour	Ala Uddin	2,010		
Labour	Raymond Marney	1,967		
Ind. Lib Dem	Anne E. Ambrose	893	19.00	New
BNP	Paul Maxwell	889	19.71	New
Ind. Lib Dem	Kathleen Caulfield	876		
Ind. Lib Dem	Betty Wright*	803		
Liberal Democrats	Syed S. Islam	627	13.23	▼44.47
Liberal Democrats	Michael P.J. Patton	567		
Conservative	Jane E. Emmerson	161	3.21	New
Conservative	Charles W. Southcombe	128		
Registered electors		8,110		▲770
Turnout		4,306	53.09	▲4.83
Rejected ballots		13	0.30	▼0.48
Labour hold				
Labour gain from Liberal Democrats				
Labour gain from Ind. Lib Dem				

=== Shadwell ===
Shadwell (3)
Party	Candidate	Votes	%	±%
Labour	Albert Lilley*	1,870	47.50	▼27.26
Labour	Pola M. Uddin*	1,652		
Labour	Abdus Shukur	1,635		
Liberal Democrats	Richard F. Roberts	889	22.05	New
Liberal Democrats	Victoria L. Ocuneff	776		
Liberal Democrats	Hilal Miah	730		
Independent Labour	Azad Miah	523	14.45	New
Conservative	Richard H. Powell	367	8.79	▼16.45
Conservative	Paul W.E. Ingham	294		
Conservative	Iain C. Dale	293		
Green	David J. Baker	261	7.21	New
Registered electors		6,832		▲591
Turnout		3,510	51.38	▲13.29
Rejected ballots		30	0.85	▼1.42
Labour hold				
Labour hold				
Labour hold				

=== Spitalfields ===
Spitalfields (3)
Party	Candidate	Votes	%	±%
Labour	Syed A. Mizan* (Note: Mazin replaced Cllr. Abbas Uddin after their resignation in 1992)	1,937	58.97	▲0.73
Labour	Ghulam Mortuza*	1,864		
Labour	Ataur Rahman	1,740		
Liberal Democrats	Muhammad N. Huque	1,018	31.58	New
Liberal Democrats	Syed N. Islam	1,013		
Liberal Democrats	Mohammed A. Matin	935		
Independent Labour	Uddin Mohi	296	9.45	New
Registered electors		5,950		▲341
Turnout		3,201	53.80	▲10.87
Rejected ballots		69	2.16	▲1.66
Labour hold				
Labour hold				
Labour hold				

=== Weavers ===
Weavers (3)
Party	Candidate	Votes	%	±%
Labour	Sunahwar Ali	1,518	42.68	▲11.39
Labour	Vanessa L. Peters	1,462		
Labour	Albert C. Jacob	1,427		
Ind. Lib Dem	Jeremy A. Shaw*	1,224	30.88	New
Ind. Lib Dem	Terry B. Milson	1,044		
Liberal Democrats	Kofi B. Appiah*	937	26.44	▼38.70
Ind. Lib Dem	Nizam Uddin	922		
Liberal Democrats	Sajjad Miah*	882		
Registered electors		6,745		▼317
Turnout		3,580	53.08	▼1.92
Rejected ballots		55	1.54	▲1.02
Labour gain from Ind. Lib Dem				
Labour gain from Liberal Democrats				
Labour gain from Liberal Democrats				
