= St Dunstan's (ward) =

Electoral ward in Tower Hamlets, England

- Electoral ward for the Tower Hamlets London Borough Council
- Borough: Tower Hamlets
- County: Greater London
- Population: 14,744 (2021)
- Area: 0.7088 km²

Current electoral ward
- Created: 2014
- Number of members: 2
- Councillors: Shafiq Islam; Shenaly Miah

St Dunstan's is an electoral ward in the London Borough of Tower Hamlets. The ward was first used in the 2014 elections. It returns two councillors to Tower Hamlets London Borough Council.

== Geography ==
The ward is named after St Dunstan's, Stepney in Tower Hamlets.

== Councillors ==
Election	Councillors	
2014	Ayas Miah (Labour)	Mahbub Alam (Tower Hamlets First)
2018	Ayas Miah (Labour)	Dipa Das (Labour)
2022	Ayas Miah (Labour)	Maisha Begum (Labour)
2026	Shafiq Islam (Aspire)	Shenaly Miah (Aspire)

== Elections ==
=== 2022 ===
St Dunstan's (2)
Party	Candidate	Votes	%	±%
Labour	Ayas Miah*	1,936	40.74	−10.41
Labour	Maisha Begum	1,840	38.72	−1.93
Aspire	Juned Khan	1,692	35.61	+17.42
Aspire	Nazir Ahmed	1,623	34.15	+23.42
Conservative	Adrian Thompson	422	8.88	+3.28
Liberal Democrats	Farhana Akther	300	6.31	+1.01
Conservative	Edward Brown	229	4.82	+0.34
Liberal Democrats	Mohammed Alam	220	4.63	+1.70
Green	Neil Thompson	202	4.25	−3.07
Rejected ballots		51		
Turnout		4,752	51.30	+2.02
Registered electors		9,263		
Labour hold		Swing		
Labour hold		Swing		

=== 2018 ===
St Dunstan's (2)
Party	Candidate	Votes	%	±%
Labour	Ayas Miah*	2,202	51.15	+9.38
Labour	Dipa Das	1,750	40.65	+11.22
PATH	Muhammad Hussain	902	20.95	N/A
Aspire	Mahbub Alam*	783	18.19	−20.14
Aspire	Momina Begum	462	10.73	N/A
PATH	Shahar Imran	449	10.43	N/A
Green	Catherine Conway	315	7.32	−2.96
Conservative	Lawrence Kay	241	5.60	−3.45
Green	Ben Hancocks	237	5.51	N/A
Liberal Democrats	Helen Harris	228	5.30	+1.20
Conservative	Dan Lambeth	193	4.48	−0.91
Liberal Democrats	Frank Muldoon	126	2.93	N/A
Rejected ballots		48		
Turnout		4,353	49.28	
Registered electors		8,833		
Labour hold		Swing		
Labour gain from Tower Hamlets First		Swing		

=== 2014 ===
St Dunstan's (2)
Party	Candidate	Votes	%	±%
Labour	Ayas Miah	1,967	41.77	
Tower Hamlets First	Mahbub Alam	1,805	38.33	
Labour	Abdal Ullah	1,386	29.43	
Tower Hamlets First	Rofique Ahmed	1,369	29.07	
Green	Chris Kilby	484	10.28	
Conservative	Charles Clarke	426	9.05	
UKIP	Martin Bryan	369	7.84	
Peace	Abdul Choudhury	254	5.39	
Conservative	Ben Mascall	254	5.39	
Liberal Democrats	Koyes Choudhury	193	4.10	
Turnout		4,780	55.78	
Labour win (new seat)				
Tower Hamlets First win (new seat)				
