= Tony Lecomber =

British politician (born 1961)

Deputy leader of the British National Party
- In office 27 September 1999 – 10 April 2006
- Leader: Nick Griffin

Personal details
- Born: 1961 (age 64–65)
- Party: British National Party (until 2006)
- Other political affiliations: National Front (1980s)

Anthony Mark Lecomber (born 1961) is a British far-right activist and former British National Party (BNP) politician who was deputy leader of the BNP from 1999 to 2006.

== Background ==
Lecomber has been active in far-right politics since the early 1980s. His role is mainly behind the scenes in planning BNP election campaigns, but his history of convictions for violence have given him prominence in anti-BNP publicity and led to his removal from the party.

He joined the National Front in the early 1980s, but allied with John Tyndall who was being blamed for the NF's poor performance at the 1979 general election. When Tyndall split to form the New National Front and later the British National Party, Lecomber followed him. He was editor of Young Nationalist, a racist and antisemitic magazine.

== Convictions ==
Lecomber was convicted for criminal damage in 1982, offences under the Explosive Substances Act in 1985, and was sentenced to three years' imprisonment in 1991 for an attack on a Jewish teacher.

On 31 October 1986, he was injured by a nailbomb that he was carrying to the offices of the Workers Revolutionary Party in Clapham. Police found 10 grenades, seven petrol bombs and two detonators at his home. For this offence, he received a three-year prison sentence at his trial on 28 November that year.

In 1991, while he was Propaganda Director of the BNP, Lecomber was sentenced to three years' imprisonment for an attack on a Jewish teacher. Lecomber was released from his three-year sentence in time to play a part in the BNP's by-election win in Millwall ward of Tower Hamlets in September 1993.

Later in the 1990s, Lecomber became closer to Nick Griffin and supported Griffin when he successfully challenged John Tyndall's leadership of the BNP in 1999. In 2006, Lecomber was sacked from his position as Group Development Officer. This followed allegations made by former Merseyside BNP organiser that Lecomber had tried to recruit him to assassinate prominent politicians and members of the British establishment. Lecomber admitted that a conversation had taken place but stated that he hadn't meant the comments to be taken literally.
