= 2010 Tower Hamlets London Borough Council election =

2010 Tower Hamlets Council election
- 6 May 2010

All 51 council seats
	First party	Second party	Third party
Party	Labour	Conservative	Liberal Democrats
Last election	26 seats, 33.2%	7 seats, 17.3%	6 seats, 18.6%
Seats won	41	8	1
Seat change	▲10	▲1	▼5
Popular vote	98,215	14,789	48,341
Percentage	38.2%	14.2%	18.8%
Swing	▲5.0%	▲14.2%	▲0.1%
	Fourth party
Party	Respect
Last election	12 seats, 22.8%
Seats won	1
Seat change	▼11
Popular vote	39,862
Percentage	15.5%
Swing	▼7.5%
Leader of Largest Party before election
Labour
Subsequent Leader of Largest Party
Labour

Map of the results of the 2010 Tower Hamlets council election. Conservatives in blue, Labour in red, Liberal Democrats in yellow and Respect in light red.

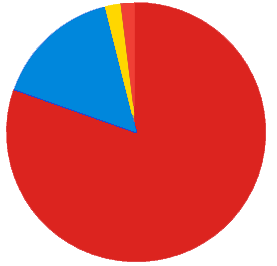
Labour Party Conservative Party Liberal Democrats Respect Party

Elections to Tower Hamlets London Borough Council took place on 6 May 2010, the same day as the 2010 United Kingdom general election. There were 17 wards electing 3 councillors each.

== Summary results ==
Tower Hamlets local election result 2010
Party	Seats	Gains	Losses	Net gain/loss	Seats %	Votes %	Votes	+/−
Labour	41	10	0	+10	80.4	38.2	98,215	+5.0
Conservative	8	1	1	0	15.7	21.0	54,021	+3.7
Liberal Democrats	1	0	3	-3	2.0	18.8	48,341	+0.1
Respect	1	0	7	-7	2.0	15.5	39,862	-7.5
Green	0	0	0	0	0.0	5.7	14,794	+2.6
BNP	0	0	0	0	0.0	0.5	1,385	-0.1
Independent	0	0	0	0	0.0	0.3	747	-3.8

== Ward results ==
=== Bethnal Green North ===
Bethnal Green North (3)
Party	Candidate	Votes	%	±%
Labour	Zenith Rahman	1,634	28.3	
Labour	Giancarlo Gibbs	1,586	27.5	
Liberal Democrats	Stephanie Eaton	1,551	26.9	
Labour	Muhammad Salique	1,476	25.6	
Liberal Democrats	Azizur Khan	1,316	22.8	
Liberal Democrats	Richard Macmillan	1,181	20.5	
Respect	Muhammad Pramanik	795	13.8	
Conservative	Nur Baksh	748	13.0	
Green	Heather Finlay	595	10.3	
Respect	Syedun Noor	594	10.3	
Green	Nicholas Lee	454	7.9	
Conservative	Alan Mak	445	7.7	
Conservative	Matthew Smith	439	7.6	
Green	Samuel Guttman Hancocks	371	6.4	
Respect	Shirin Samanta	314	5.4	
Independent	Ann Edmead	156	2.7	
Turnout		5,768	62.10	
Labour hold		Swing		
Labour gain from Liberal Democrats		Swing		
Liberal Democrats hold		Swing		

=== Bethnal Green South ===
Bethnal Green South (3)
Party	Candidate	Votes	%	±%
Labour	Mizanur Chaudhury	1,952	33.4	
Labour	Sirajul Islam	1,848	31.6	
Labour	Lesley Pavitt	1,519	26.0	
Respect	Salim Ullah	1,166	19.9	
Respect	Abu Mahmood	1,091	18.7	
Respect	Monjur Ali	1,087	18.6	
Liberal Democrats	Olivier Adam	1,061	18.1	
Liberal Democrats	Rahena Anisha	1,048	17.9	
Liberal Democrats	Mohammed Uddin	779	13.3	
Conservative	Salina Bagum	520	8.9	
Conservative	Noor Miah	497	8.5	
Green	Joshua Barber	436	7.5	
Green	Paul Burgess	376	6.4	
Conservative	Nicolette Turki	367	6.3	
Green	Darren Chetty	282	4.8	
Turnout		5,848	60.29	
Labour hold		Swing		
Labour hold		Swing		
Labour gain from Respect		Swing		

=== Blackwall and Cubitt Town ===
Blackwall and Cubitt Town (3)
Party	Candidate	Votes	%	±%
Conservative	Tim Archer	2,945	45.7	
Conservative	Peter Golds	2,095	32.5	
Conservative	Gloria Theniel	2,045	31.7	
Labour	Wais Islam	1,729	26.8	
Labour	Kathy McTasney	1,658	25.7	
Labour	Crissy Townsend	1,581	24.5	
Liberal Democrats	Martin Carr	1,250	19.4	
Liberal Democrats	Freda Graf	1,097	17.0	
Liberal Democrats	John Griffiths	953	14.8	
Respect	Gulan Choudhury	799	12.4	
Respect	Mohammed Rahman	627	9.7	
Respect	Abdul Malik	577	8.9	
Turnout		6,448	54.86	
Conservative hold		Swing		
Conservative hold		Swing		
Conservative hold		Swing		

=== Bow East ===
Bow East (3)
Party	Candidate	Votes	%	±%
Labour	Marc Francis	2,297	37.9	
Labour	Carli Harper-Penman	1,865	30.7	
Labour	Ahmed Omer	1,724	28.4	
Liberal Democrats	Dave Campbell	1,204	19.8	
Liberal Democrats	Rafique Ullah	1,040	17.1	
Liberal Democrats	Paolo Adragna	981	16.2	
Conservative	Claire Palmer	807	13.3	
Conservative	Philip Groves	799	13.2	
Conservative	Mark Walters	684	11.3	
Green	Marcus Boyle	547	9.0	
Respect	Mujibur Rahman	506	8.3	
Green	Alan Duffell	339	5.6	
BNP	Mike Underwood	318	5.2	
Green	Joseph Lucey	316	5.2	
Respect	Bryony Shanks	243	4.0	
Respect	Carole Swords	223	3.7	
Independent	Andrew Coles	152	2.5	
Independent	Emdadul Haque	95	1.6	
Independent	Gareth Thomas	92	1.5	
Turnout		6,066	58.63	
Labour hold		Swing		
Labour hold		Swing		
Labour hold		Swing		

=== Bow West ===
Bow West (3)
Party	Candidate	Votes	%	±%
Labour	Ann Jackson	2,206	37.1	
Labour	Joshua Peck	2,096	35.3	
Labour	Anwar Khan	2,070	34.8	
Liberal Democrats	Sharon Bench	1,260	21.2	
Conservative	Anwara Ali	1,200	20.2	
Liberal Democrats	Jainal Chowdhury	992	16.7	
Liberal Democrats	Raymond Warner	783	13.2	
Conservative	Francesca Preece	723	12.2	
Conservative	Nicholas Huddart	662	11.1	
Green	Janice Cartwright	576	9.7	
Respect	Syed Islam	574	9.7	
Green	Alistair Polson	493	8.3	
Green	Chris Smith	464	7.8	
Respect	Kay Ballard	356	6.0	
Independent	Terry McGrenara	111	1.9	
Turnout		5,943	62.25	
Labour hold		Swing		
Labour hold		Swing		
Labour gain from Conservative		Swing		

=== Bromley by Bow ===
Bromley by Bow (3)
Party	Candidate	Votes	%	±%
Labour	Khales Ahmed	2,483	45.2	
Labour	Rania Khan	2,426	44.2	
Labour	Helal Uddin	2,314	42.1	
Conservative	Subrina Hossain	1,105	20.1	
Respect	Bodrul Islam	1,100	20.0	
Liberal Democrats	Shamina Begum	1,055	19.2	
Liberal Democrats	Alkas Hoque	831	15.1	
Respect	Mohammed Miah	765	13.9	
Respect	Kamal Uddin	737	13.4	
Conservative	Stuart Hand	673	12.2	
Liberal Democrats	Koyes Choudhury	653	11.9	
Conservative	Daryl Stafford	599	10.9	
Green	Thomas Crosbie	401	7.3	
Green	Tatyana Guttmann Hancocks	304	5.5	
Turnout		5,494	62.59	
Labour hold		Swing		
Labour hold		Swing		
Labour gain from Respect		Swing		

=== East India and Lansbury ===
East India and Lansbury (3)
Party	Candidate	Votes	%	±%
Labour	Abul Ahmed	2,295	42.2	
Labour	Shiria Khatun	2,294	42.2	
Labour	Rajib Ahmed	2,181	40.1	
Liberal Democrats	Iqbal Hossain	1,302	23.9	
Conservative	Martin Coxall	878	16.1	
Respect	Kamrul Hussain	835	15.3	
Respect	Zakir Hussain	820	15.1	
Conservative	Paul Ingham	810	14.9	
Conservative	Ahmed Mustaque	631	11.6	
Liberal Democrats	Zillur Uddin	629	11.6	
Liberal Democrats	Zak Ali	619	11.4	
Respect	Asha Affi	603	11.1	
Green	Jamie Upton	408	7.5	
BNP	James Searle	400	7.4	
Turnout		5,442	59.68	
Labour hold		Swing		
Labour hold		Swing		
Labour hold		Swing		

=== Limehouse ===
Limehouse (3)
Party	Candidate	Votes	%	±%
Labour	Lutfa Begum	2,193	35.4	
Labour	David Edgar	1,880	30.3	
Conservative	Craig Aston	1,602	25.8	
Conservative	Graham Collins	1,525	24.6	
Respect	Dulal Uddin	1,500	24.2	
Labour	Victoria Obaze	1,488	24.0	
Respect	Hafiza Salam	1,357	21.9	
Conservative	Sakib Ershad	1,280	20.7	
Respect	Anfor Ali	1,225	19.8	
Liberal Democrats	Hafizur Rahman	782	12.6	
Liberal Democrats	Faruk Chowdhury	722	11.6	
Green	Jennifer Aaron-Foster	477	7.7	
Green	Louise Davies	473	7.6	
Liberal Democrats	Muazzam Rakol	445	7.2	
Green	Simon Earp	267	4.3	
Turnout		6,198	61.77	
Labour hold		Swing		
Labour hold		Swing		
Conservative gain from Respect		Swing		

=== Mile End and Globe Town ===
Mile End and Globe Town (3)
Party	Candidate	Votes	%	±%
Labour	Rofique Ahmed	2,214	35.7	
Labour	Bill Turner	2,005	32.4	
Labour	Amy Whitelock	1,824	29.4	
Liberal Democrats	Shamsul Hoque	1,279	20.6	
Liberal Democrats	Rafique Ahmed	1,179	19.0	
Liberal Democrats	Syed Islam	927	15.0	
Respect	Ahad Babu Chowdhury	916	14.8	
Conservative	Muhammed Shaheed	883	14.3	
Conservative	Thomas Lowe	680	11.0	
Conservative	Wesley Henderson	679	11.0	
Respect	Habib Rahman	558	9.0	
Green	Ian Allsop	519	8.4	
Respect	Tony Collins	439	7.1	
Green	Jesse Bryson	400	6.5	
BNP	Russell Pick	309	5.0	
Green	Kalim Patwa	284	4.6	
Turnout		6,194	59.48	
Labour hold		Swing		
Labour hold		Swing		
Labour hold		Swing		

=== Mile End East ===
Mile End East (3)
Party	Candidate	Votes	%	±%
Labour	Rachael Saunders	2,506	48.4	
Labour	Motin uz-Zaman	2,067	39.9	
Labour	Kosru Uddin	2,056	39.7	
Conservative	Ahmed Hussain	1,059	20.4	
Respect	Muhammad Rahmani	967	18.7	
Liberal Democrats	Hafiz Choudhury	944	18.2	
Respect	Jamir Chowdhury	907	17.5	
Conservative	Caroline Kerswell	885	17.1	
Conservative	Bodrul Choudhury	832	16.1	
Liberal Democrats	Altaf Hussain	787	15.2	
Respect	Fiyaz Ali	755	14.6	
Liberal Democrats	Kamrun Shajahan	658	12.7	
Turnout		5,179	59.97	
Labour hold		Swing		
Labour hold		Swing		
Labour hold		Swing		

=== Millwall ===
Millwall (3)
Party	Candidate	Votes	%	±%
Conservative	Zara Davis	2,959	37.2	
Conservative	David Snowdon	2,693	33.8	
Conservative	Maium Miah	2,519	31.6	
Labour	John Cray	2,180	27.4	
Labour	Doros Ullah	1,943	24.4	
Labour	Garry Wykes	1,664	20.9	
Liberal Democrats	John Denniston	1,362	17.1	
Liberal Democrats	Iain Porter	1,177	14.8	
Liberal Democrats	George McFarlane	1,099	13.8	
Respect	Shiuly Begum	668	8.4	
Respect	Muzibul Islam	498	6.3	
BNP	Dave Anderson	358	4.5	
Respect	Kevin Ovenden	277	3.5	
Turnout		7,960	52.96	
Conservative hold		Swing		
Conservative hold		Swing		
Conservative hold		Swing		

=== St Dunstan's and Stepney Green ===
St Dunstan's and Stepney Green (3)
Party	Candidate	Votes	%	±%
Labour	Abdal Ullah	2,376	35.3	
Labour	Oliur Rahman	2,319	34.4	
Labour	Judith Gardiner	2,078	30.8	
Respect	Mahbub-Mamun Alam	1,458	21.6	
Respect	Abdul Hussain	1,261	18.7	
Respect	Shahar Imran	1,150	17.1	
Conservative	Aleyk Miah	1,136	16.9	
Liberal Democrats	Ahbab Miah	1,106	16.4	
Liberal Democrats	Sufian Choudhury	1,038	15.4	
Conservative	Harun Rashid	995	14.8	
Liberal Democrats	Kaltun Ali	923	13.7	
Conservative	Christopher Wilford	849	12.6	
Green	Kirsty Chestnutt	595	8.8	
Green	Margaret Crosbie	504	7.5	
Green	Frances Schwartz	410	6.1	
Independent	Mohammed Uddin	297	4.4	
Turnout		6,738	62.01	
Labour hold		Swing		
Labour hold		Swing		
Labour hold		Swing		

=== St Katharine's and Wapping ===
St Katharine's and Wapping (3)
Party	Candidate	Votes	%	±%
Conservative	Emma Jones	1,623	33.5	
Labour	Shafiqul Haque	1,455	30.0	
Labour	Denise Jones	1,447	29.9	
Conservative	Neil King	1,414	29.2	
Conservative	Paul Mawdsley	1,383	28.5	
Labour	Michael Keith	1,330	27.4	
Liberal Democrats	Geoffrey Juden	732	15.1	
Respect	Muhammad Chowdhury	491	10.1	
Liberal Democrats	Quadri Mamun	454	9.4	
Respect	Muhammad Islam	453	9.3	
Liberal Democrats	Elvyra Sadiene	445	9.2	
Respect	Dilwara Ali	418	8.6	
Green	Martine Hall	395	8.1	
Green	John Foster	388	8.0	
Green	Alana Jelinek	247	5.1	
Turnout		4,847	62.52	
Conservative hold		Swing		
Labour hold		Swing		
Labour hold		Swing		

=== Shadwell ===
Shadwell (3)
Party	Candidate	Votes	%	±%
Labour	Alibor Choudhury	1,915	35.6	
Respect	Harun Miah	1,628	30.3	
Labour	Rabina Khan	1,539	28.6	
Labour	John Houghton	1,536	28.6	
Conservative	Khaled Khan	1,251	23.3	
Respect	Mamun Rashid	1,250	23.3	
Conservative	Nasima Begum	1,134	21.1	
Conservative	Andrew Wood	1,003	18.7	
Respect	Monjur Alam	807	15.0	
Liberal Democrats	Muhammad Alom	700	13.0	
Liberal Democrats	Jewel Choudhury	603	11.2	
Liberal Democrats	Mostaque Hussain	595	11.1	
Turnout		5,375	64.53	
Labour gain from Respect		Swing		
Respect hold		Swing		
Labour gain from Respect		Swing		

=== Spitalfields and Banglatown ===
Spitalfields and Banglatown (3)
Party	Candidate	Votes	%	±%
Labour	Lutfur Rahman	1,660	38.0	
Labour	Shelina Akhtar	1,545	35.4	
Labour	Helal Abbas	1,500	34.3	
Respect	Fozol Miah	1,068	24.4	
Liberal Democrats	Ben Dyer	839	19.2	
Liberal Democrats	Moniruzzaman Syed	673	15.4	
Conservative	Philip Vracas	571	13.1	
Conservative	Sadek Khan	561	10.6	
Liberal Democrats	Jewel Toropdar	532	12.2	
Conservative	Asad Ahmod	492	11.3	
Green	Nico Aspinall	483	11.1	
Respect	Ahad Ali	441	10.1	
Respect	Alibaba Prasad	437	10.0	
Green	Mohammed Hossain	265	6.1	
Independent	Shah Yousuf	141	3.2	
Turnout		4,369	56.48	
Labour hold		Swing		
Labour hold		Swing		
Labour gain from Respect		Swing		

=== Weavers ===
Weavers (3)
Party	Candidate	Votes	%	±%
Labour	Kabir Ahmed	2,082	38.3	
Labour	Anna Lynch	1,895	34.9	
Labour	Abdul Mukit	1,532	28.2	
Liberal Democrats	Philip Baker	1,383	25.4	
Liberal Democrats	Sajjad Miah	1,179	21.7	
Liberal Democrats	Tim O'Flaherty	1,099	20.2	
Respect	Yousuf Khan	1,009	18.6	
Respect	Fazlul Hoque	892	16.4	
Respect	Rob Hoveman	728	13.4	
Conservative	Akhtar Ahmed	667	12.3	
Conservative	Gias Ahmed	640	11.8	
Green	Catherine Guttman	628	11.6	
Green	Daniel Jackson	516	9.5	
Green	Ben Hancocks	496	9.1	
Conservative	Abdi Hassan	477	8.8	
Turnout		5,435	62.02	
Labour gain from Liberal Democrats		Swing		
Labour gain from Liberal Democrats		Swing		
Labour gain from Respect		Swing		

=== Whitechapel ===
Whitechapel (3)
Party	Candidate	Votes	%	±%
Labour	Shahed Ali	2,158	35.1	
Labour	Aminur Khan	2,091	34.0	
Labour	Abdul Asad	2,003	32.6	
Liberal Democrats	Saleh Ahmed	1,119	18.2	
Respect	Lutfur Rahman	1,114	18.1	
Liberal Democrats	Kamal Ali	1,069	17.4	
Conservative	Ahad Abdul	1,044	17.0	
Respect	Abdulla Almamun	1,004	16.3	
Conservative	Fanu Mia	915	14.9	
Liberal Democrats	Shamim Rahman	906	14.7	
Respect	Saidul Alom	890	14.5	
Conservative	David Fell	832	13.5	
Green	Richard Leyland	599	9.7	
Green	Raymond Waring	383	6.2	
Green	Mohammed Uddin	335	5.4	
Turnout		6,151	58.30	
Labour hold		Swing		
Labour hold		Swing		
Labour hold		Swing		
