= Derek Beackon =

British politician (born 1946)

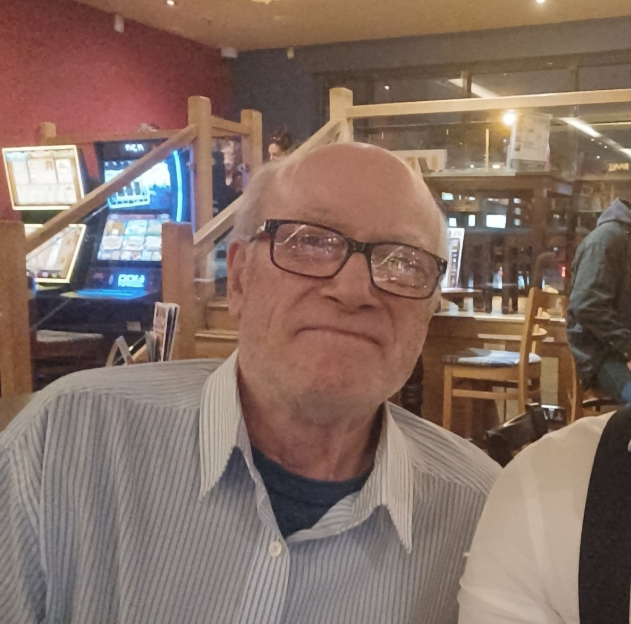
- Beackon in 2024

Member of Tower Hamlets Council for Millwall Ward
- In office 16 September 1993 – 5 May 1994
- Preceded by: E. T. Johns
- Succeeded by: Julia Mainwaring

Personal details
- Born: Stepney, London, England
- Party: British Democratic Party (2022–present)
- Other political affiliations: British National Party (1986–2012); National Front (2012–2022)

Derek William Beackon (born 1946 in Stepney) is a British far-right politician. He is currently a member of the British Democratic Party (BDP), and a former member of the British National Party (BNP) and National Front. In 1993, he became the BNP's first elected councillor, although he served for only eight months.

== Beackon and the emergence of the BNP ==
Beackon joined the BNP in 1986 as an associate member, and became a full member two years later. Known as "Daddy", Beackon first stood as a candidate for the BNP in 1990 in the Redcoat ward of the London Borough of Tower Hamlets where he gained 3% of the vote, a typically low total for the party at the time.

Although Beackon's personal result had been a disappointment in Tower Hamlets, the area had slowly been growing as a centre of support for the BNP. The BNP still lagged behind the National Front (NF) in terms of public profile (even though that movement had fallen into severe decline). The BNP had respectable results in the area in a series of council by-elections in 1990. The area had also been one of the centres of support for John Tyndall during the 1992 general election; Tyndall had stood in Bow and Poplar, which included much of Tower Hamlets.

Under the directorship of local organizer Eddy Butler, the party had instigated a "Rights for Whites" campaign in the area, bringing back a slogan that had been employed by Martin Webster and the NF during the 1970s. Focusing on the perceived negative impact of immigration on the area of employment and housing, the campaign operated as if it was simply a local pressure group before gradually introducing the BNP name into Rights for Whites literature.

The initiative first produced results in the Millwall ward in October 1992 when a strong canvassing effort by local activists helped BNP candidate Barry Osborne capture 20% of the vote in a by-election. Millwall had long been a seat of unemployment associated with the declining Port of London. Most of the population had been descended from the 19th century workers who had built and operated the docks. With the building of the Limehouse Link Road, predominantly Bangladeshi families from a run-down Council estate in Limehouse (the St Vincent Estate) were rehoused in properties in Millwall. These properties had been marketed as "luxury", but had failed to sell after a downturn in the property market. This was presented as favourable treatment on grounds of race by the "Liberal Democrat Focus Team" seeking to capitalise on the issue. However, in a close three-way contest, the BNP gained from this campaign more than its authors.

A Labour councillor resigned in the same ward soon after this, sparking another by-election on 16 September 1993. Beackon was chosen as the candidate this time, following the local party's policy of rotating members. Beackon's campaign followed Butler's blueprint of emphasising "Rights for Whites" through canvassing and leafleting. He abandoned the old policy of holding a public meeting as he felt they proved too counterproductive by attracting large crowds of protesters, particularly from the Anti-Nazi League and Anti-Fascist Action. Beackon won the by-election of 16 September 1993 with 1480 votes (33.9%), beating Labour by 7 votes, with an overall turnout of 44%. He thus became the first elected representative for the party.

=== Reaction to Beackon's win ===
The immediate reaction to Beackon's election was widespread condemnation from many sections of wider society. The Daily Mirror headline on 18 September read "SIEG HEIL... and Now He's a British Councillor", setting the tone for a slew of condemnation on the basis of Beackon being a white nationalist. Among those to express their outrage were the main political parties, the Archbishop of Canterbury George Carey and the Commissioner of the Metropolitan Police, Sir Paul Condon. Beackon's own use of hateful language also damaged him and he was quoted in the Daily Mirror when, after being asked about refuse collection, he said that "The Asians are rubbish and that is what we are going to clear from the streets."

== Beackon as a councillor ==
As a councillor, Beackon found it hard to discharge his duties effectively because of a boycott by other councillors and staff, who staged a protest walk-out after his election. He was hampered by his own inexperience: the BNP press office had to speak for him after he failed to distinguish between the housing and social service departments in a newspaper interview with the East London Advertiser. He had to flee his flat in Wapping to live in hiding with his brother in Bethnal Green during which time his housing benefit was cancelled.

Beackon was unable to fulfill his promises to influence housing allocation to benefit white constituents. Overall, during his time in office Beackon was characterized as a weak councillor who had trouble following the council agenda. At the time it was suggested that Beackon was virtually illiterate and was unable to read council documents; he later strenuously denied the allegations while admitting that he had trouble understanding their meaning.

When the seat went up for election again in 1994 a strong mobilization of voters against the BNP was undertaken by Labour, with the turnout rising to 65%. Despite Beackon's generally ineffectual performance as a councillor he added 561 votes to his total, although the seat was lost as the rest of the vote largely coalesced around Labour, and the Liberal Democrat vote collapsed. He was the only successful BNP candidate during John Tyndall's tenure as party leader. The BNP did not win any more council seats until they won three seats in Burnley in 2002.

== Chief steward ==
Before and during his run as a Tower Hamlets councillor, Beackon served as the BNP's chief steward, which included the job of ensuring order at BNP meetings. As chief steward he was given the job of leading the party's bodyguard group set up in 1992. Made up largely of casuals and white power skinheads, the group soon proved difficult for the middle-aged Beackon to control, and before long, real control lay with Charlie Sargent and his brother Steve. Following Beackon's election, the group became disillusioned with the electoral path and broke away from the BNP, adopting the name Combat 18. Eddy Butler and Tony Lecomber were among the BNP members targeted for attack, in what became a bitter split.

== Later BNP activism ==
Beackon's profile fell away somewhat after his election defeat as the BNP failed to capitalise on their breakthrough. He remained loyal to Butler, who had fallen out of favour with Tyndall, and was interviewed for the first issue of The Patriot, a dissident journal within the party associated with Butler, Lecomber, Michael Newland, and others on the party's 'modernising' wing, all of whom went on to back Nick Griffin in his successful challenge to Tyndall's leadership. Indeed, Beackon appeared in Moving On, Moving Up, a glossy brochure produced by Griffin during his leadership campaign, endorsing the former Political Soldier for the BNP leadership.

Despite this support Beackon remained a peripheral figure within the BNP under Griffin's leadership and before long he fell in with the group of anti-Griffin activists around Tyndall. His eulogy to Tyndall was one of the few written by an active BNP member to appear in the final issue of Spearhead, released immediately following Tyndall's death. Still nominally a member of the BNP he has become associated with the 'Friends of John Tyndall', an informal anti-Griffin group largely controlled by Richard Edmonds and John Morse in attending a speech by Valerie Tyndall which they had organised in July 2007. The event included stalls by a number of political parties – the National Front, England First Party and the British People's Party. The BNP did not participate.

Beackon re-emerged as a BNP activist in Thurrock, Essex. He was a BNP candidate for the Orsett ward of Thurrock Council in May 2008. This is a safe Conservative ward and Beackon finished in third place with 330 votes, 17.8% of the total.

For the 2010 council elections, he stood for the Chadwell St Mary ward and gained 811 votes (19.8%).

== Post-BNP years ==
By 2012, Beackon had left the BNP and joined the National Front, standing as a candidate in the Chadwell St Mary ward for the local elections in Thurrock and gained 103 votes (6.1%) in fourth place out of five candidates by beating the Liberal Democrat.

In 2022, alongside several other prominent far-right activists and politicians, Beackon joined the British Democratic Party (BDP). It was founded in 2013 by then-MEP Andrew Brons, who had narrowly failed to oust Griffin in the 2011 BNP leadership election.
