= St Mary's (Tower Hamlets ward) =

- Former electoral ward for the Tower Hamlets London Borough Council
- Park ward boundaries from 1978 to 2002
- Borough: Tower Hamlets
- County: Greater London

Former electoral ward
- Created: 1965
- Abolished: 2002
- Councillors: 1965–1978: 3; 1978–2002: 2

St Mary's was an electoral ward in the London Borough of Tower Hamlets. The ward was first used in the 1964 elections and last used for the 1998 elections. It returned councillors to Tower Hamlets London Borough Council.

== List of councillors ==
Term	Councillor	Party
1964–1971	Solly Kaye	Communist
1964–1969	Barney Borman	Communist
1964–1968	P. Roche	Communist
1968–1971	Max Levitas	Communist
1969–1974	Robert Ashkettle	Labour
1978–1990	Robert Ashkettle	Labour
1971–1978	H. Conway	Labour
1971–1978	R. Warner	Labour
1974–1990	Barnett Saunders	Labour
1990–1994	Ronald Osborne	Liberal Democrats
1990–1994	Justine Ward	Liberal Democrats
1994–1996	Amanda Linton	Labour
1994–1998	Bodrul Alom	Labour
1996–1998	Judith Gardiner	Labour
1998–2002	Motin Uz-Zaman	Labour
1998–2002	Alexander Heslop	Labour

== Summary ==
Councillors elected by party at each general borough election.

- Communist
- Labour
- Liberal Democrats

== 1978–2002 Tower Hamlets council elections ==
There was a revision of ward boundaries in Tower Hamlets in 1978. The number of councillors was reduced from three to two.

=== 1998 election ===
The election took place on 7 May 1998.

1998 Tower Hamlets London Borough Council election: St Mary's (2)
Party	Candidate	Votes	%	±%
Labour	Motin Uz-Zaman	826		
Labour	Alexander Heslop	819		
Conservative	Habibur Choudhury	358		
Turnout		2,003		
Labour hold		Swing		
Labour hold		Swing		

=== 1996 by-election ===
The by-election took place on 9 May 1996, following the resignation of Amanda Linton.

1996 St Mary's by-election
Party	Candidate	Votes	%	±%
Labour	Judith Gardiner	1,027		
Liberal Democrats	James Langan	267		
Conservative	Reza Choudhury	243		
Militant Labour	Hugo Pierre	706		
Turnout				
Labour hold		Swing		

=== 1994 election ===
The election took place on 5 May 1994.

1994 Tower Hamlets London Borough Council election: St Mary's (2)
Party	Candidate	Votes	%	±%
Labour	Amanda Linton	1,625		
Labour	Bodrul Alom	1,560		
Ind. Lib Dem	R. Bowler	551		
Ind. Lib Dem	R.J. Warner	545		
Liberal Democrats	A. Ali	141		
Conservative	M.A.S. Khan	104		
Turnout		4,332	54.7	
Labour gain from Liberal Democrats		Swing		
Labour gain from Liberal Democrats		Swing		

=== 1990 election ===
The election took place on 3 May 1990.

1990 Tower Hamlets London Borough Council election: St Mary's (2)
Party	Candidate	Votes	%	±%
Liberal Democrats	Ronald Osborne	604		
Liberal Democrats	Justine Ward	596		
Labour	Barnett Saunders	592		
Labour	Julia Mainwaring	588		
Community Campaign	Shah Haque	219		
Tenants, Leaseholders & Residents	Emmanuel Parris	174		
Tenants, Leaseholders & Residents	Raymond Warner	145		
Independent	Abu Hassain	91		
Conservative	Mohammed Khan	58		
Conservative	Andrew Smith	39		
Majority				
Turnout		3,632	45.6	
Liberal Democrats gain from Labour		Swing		
Liberal Democrats gain from Labour		Swing		

=== 1986 election ===
The election took place on 8 May 1986.

1986 Tower Hamlets London Borough Council election: St Mary's (2)
Party	Candidate	Votes	%	±%
Labour	Robert Ashkettle	948		
Labour	Barnett Saunders	861		
SDP	Abdul Barik	316		
SDP	Paul Mathurin	253		
Conservative	Mohammad Ali	218		
Conservative	Robert Ingram	147		
Majority				
Turnout		4,848	31.1	
Labour hold		Swing		
Labour hold		Swing		

=== 1982 election ===
The election took place on 6 May 1982. Quadratul Islam (Social Democratic Party Welfare Association) withdrew before polling day.

1982 Tower Hamlets London Borough Council election: St Mary's (2)
Party	Candidate	Votes	%	±%
Labour	Robert Ashkettle	877		
Labour	Barnett Saunders	834		
SDP	Graham Palfrey-Smith	241		
SDP	Rafique Ullah	205		
Communist	Max Levitas	172		
Conservative	Richard Pearson	151		
Conservative	John Razzak	115		
Social Democratic Party Welfare Association	Quadratul Islam	0		
Majority				
Turnout		4,848	31.1	
Labour hold		Swing		
Labour hold		Swing		

=== 1978 election ===
The election took place on 4 May 1978.

1978 Tower Hamlets London Borough Council election: St Mary's (2)
Party	Candidate	Votes	%	±%
Labour	Robert Ashkettle	1,083		
Labour	Barnett Saunders	1,027		
Conservative	Brenda Epstein	378		
Communist	Max Levitas	313		
Conservative	Edna Hill	251		
National Front	John Gibbons	56		
National Front	Terence Jellis	52		
Majority				
Turnout		5,351	31.7	
Labour win (new boundaries)				
Labour win (new boundaries)				

== 1964–1978 Tower Hamlets council elections ==
External image
- Map showing St Mary's ward boundaries from 1965 to 1978

=== 1974 election ===
The election took place on 2 May 1974.

1974 Tower Hamlets London Borough Council election: St Mary's (3)
Party	Candidate	Votes	%	±%
Labour	H. Conway	729		
Labour	Barnett Saunders	697		
Labour	R. Warner	657		
Communist	Max Levitas	280		
Conservative	M. Gilmore-Ellis	133		
Conservative	L. Sumont	129		
Majority				
Turnout		5,239	19.9	
Labour hold		Swing		
Labour hold		Swing		
Labour hold		Swing		

=== 1971 election ===
The election took place on 13 May 1971.

1971 Tower Hamlets London Borough Council election: St Mary's (3)
Party	Candidate	Votes	%	±%
Labour	Robert Ashkettle	990		
Labour	H. Conway	969		
Labour	R. Warner	867		
Communist	Solly Kaye	458		
Communist	Max Levitas	401		
Communist	Kevin Halpin	385		
Conservative	C. Ingoldby	179		
Conservative	A. Heller	170		
Conservative	A. Nadav	161		
Majority				
Turnout				
Labour gain from Communist		Swing		
Labour gain from Communist		Swing		
Labour gain from Communist		Swing		

=== 1969 by-election ===
A by-election was held on 26 June 1969.

1969 St Mary's by-election
Party	Candidate	Votes	%	±%
Labour	Robert Ashkettle	533		
Communist	D. Lyons	454		
Majority				
Turnout				
Labour gain from Communist		Swing		

=== 1968 election ===
The election took place on 9 May 1968.

1968 Tower Hamlets London Borough Council election: St Mary's (3)
Party	Candidate	Votes	%	±%
Communist	Solly Kaye	635		
Communist	Barney Borman	624		
Communist	Max Levitas	549		
Labour	H. Conway	481		
Labour	Robert Ashkettle	428		
Labour	S. Marchant	428		
Majority				
Turnout		6,027	19.1	
Communist hold		Swing		
Communist hold		Swing		
Communist hold		Swing		

=== 1964 by-election ===
The by-election took place on 13 August 1964.

1964 St Mary's by-election
Party	Candidate	Votes	%	±%
Communist	Barney Borman	709		
Labour	J. Duggan	297		
Liberal	M. Dove	217		
Majority		412		
Turnout		5,664	21.6	
Communist hold		Swing		

=== 1964 election ===
The election took place on 7 May 1964.

1964 Tower Hamlets London Borough Council election: St Mary's (3)
Party	Candidate	Votes	%	±%
Communist	Solly Kaye	670		
Communist	Barney Borman	636		
Communist	P. Roche	542		
Labour	A. Bermel	522		
Labour	A. Butler	507		
Labour	J. Duggan	477		
Liberal	M. Dove	250		
Liberal	T. Bond	220		
Liberal	S. Woodham	209		
Turnout		1,394	24.6	
Communist win (new seat)				
Communist win (new seat)				
Communist win (new seat)				
