= Tower Hamlets London Borough Council elections =

Class of election in the United Kingdom

Tower Hamlets London Borough Council, the local authority for the London Borough of Tower Hamlets, is elected every four years.

== Political control ==
A map showing the wards of Tower Hamlets from 2002 to 2014

A map showing the wards of Tower Hamlets since 2014

Composition of the council
| Year | Labour | Liberal Democrats (Note: Includes totals for the predecessors of the Liberal Democrats, the Liberal Party and SDP (both of which participated in the Alliance).) | Conservative | Aspire | Tower Hamlets First | Respect | Communist | Green | Independents & Others | Council control after election |
|---|---|---|---|---|---|---|---|---|---|---|
Local government reorganisation; council established (60 seats)
| 1964 | 55 | 0 | 0 | – | – | – | 3 | – | 2 | Labour |
| 1968 | 57 | 0 | 0 | – | – | – | 3 | – | 0 | Labour |
| 1971 | 60 | 0 | 0 | – | – | – | 0 | – | 0 | Labour |
| 1974 | 60 | 0 | 0 | – | – | – | 0 | 0 | 0 | Labour |
New ward boundaries (50 seats)
| 1978 | 43 | 7 | 0 | – | – | – | 0 | 0 | 0 | Labour |
| 1982 | 31 | 18 | 0 | – | – | – | 0 | 0 | 1 | Labour |
| 1986 | 24 | 26 | 0 | – | – | – | 0 | 0 | 0 | Alliance |
| 1990 | 20 | 30 | 0 | – | – | – | 0 | 0 | 0 | Liberal Democrats |
| 1994 | 43 | 7 | 0 | – | – | – | – | 0 | 0 | Labour |
| 1998 | 41 | 9 | 0 | – | – | – | – | 0 | 0 | Labour |
New ward boundaries (51 seats)
| 2002 | 35 | 16 | 0 | – | – | – | – | 0 | 0 | No overall control |
| 2006 | 26 | 6 | 7 | – | – | 12 | – | 0 | 0 | Labour |
| 2010 | 41 | 1 | 8 | – | – | 1 | – | 0 | 0 | Labour |
New ward boundaries (45 seats)
| 2014 | 22 | 0 | 5 | – | 18 | 0 | – | 0 | 0 | No overall control |
| 2018 | 42 | 0 | 2 | – | – | – | – | 0 | 1 (Note: 1 People's Alliance of Tower Hamlets) | Labour |
| 2022 | 19 | 0 | 1 | 24 | – | – | – | 1 | 0 | Aspire |
| 2026 | 5 | 1 | 1 | 33 | – | – | – | 5 | 0 | Aspire |

== Council elections ==
The first elections to Tower Hamlets council were in 1964, in readiness for the Council coming into being in 1965. The first two elections were held every three years, and since 1974 elections have been held every four years.

From 1964 to 1978, the Council had 60 members, and ward boundaries remained constant, with none of the wards crossing the old Metropolitan Borough boundaries. The number of Councillors was reduced to 50 for the 1978 elections, and ward boundaries were changed; these borders remained in use until 2002. The ward boundaries changed for the 2002 elections, with all wards receiving 3 member seats, increasing the numbers of Councillors to 51.

- 1964 Tower Hamlets London Borough Council election
- 1968 Tower Hamlets London Borough Council election
- 1971 Tower Hamlets London Borough Council election
- 1974 Tower Hamlets London Borough Council election
- 1978 Tower Hamlets London Borough Council election (boundary changes increased the number of seats by ten)
- 1982 Tower Hamlets London Borough Council election
- 1986 Tower Hamlets London Borough Council election
- 1990 Tower Hamlets London Borough Council election
- 1994 Tower Hamlets London Borough Council election (boundary changes took place but the number of seats remained the same) (Note: The City and London Borough Boundaries Order 1993) (Note: The East London Boroughs (London Borough Boundaries) (No. 2) Order 1993) (Note: The Hackney and Tower Hamlets (London Borough Boundaries) Order 1993)
- 1998 Tower Hamlets London Borough Council election
- 2002 Tower Hamlets London Borough Council election (boundary changes increased the number of seats by one)
- 2006 Tower Hamlets London Borough Council election
- 2010 Tower Hamlets London Borough Council election
- 2014 Tower Hamlets London Borough Council election (boundary changes reduced the number of seats by six)
- 2018 Tower Hamlets London Borough Council election
- 2022 Tower Hamlets London Borough Council election
- 2026 Tower Hamlets London Borough Council election

== Mayoral elections ==
- The results of the 2010, 2014, 2015, 2018 and 2022 elections can be found here.

== Borough result maps ==
2002 results map

2006 results map

2010 results map

2014 results map

2018 results map

2022 results map

2026 results map

== By-election results ==
=== 1964-1968 ===
St Mary's by-election, 13 August 1964
| Party | Candidate | Votes | % | ±% |
|---|---|---|---|---|
| Communist | Barney Borman | 709 | | |
| Labour | J. Duggan | 297 | | |
| Liberal | M. Dove | 217 | | |
| Majority | | 412 | | |
| Turnout | | 5,664 | 21.6 | |
| Communist hold | | Swing | | |

Poplar Millwall by-election, 19 November 1965
| Party | Candidate | Votes | % | ±% |
|---|---|---|---|---|
| Labour | Ted Johns | 662 | | |
| Tenants Association | L.A. Jordan | 535 | | |
| Majority | | 127 | | |
| Turnout | | 5,505 | 21.8 | |
| Labour gain from Independent | | Swing | | |

- The gain was from the Residents' Association.

=== 1968-1971 ===
St Mary's by-election, 26 June 1969
| Party | Candidate | Votes | % | ±% |
|---|---|---|---|---|
| Labour | R. W. Ashkettle | 533 | | |
| Communist | D. Lyons | 454 | | |
| Majority | | 79 | | |
| Turnout | | | 17.1 | |
| Labour gain from Communist | | Swing | | |

Bethnal Green West by-election, 24 September 1970
| Party | Candidate | Votes | % | ±% |
|---|---|---|---|---|
| Labour | C. H. Main | 633 | | |
| Liberal | C. Suett | 82 | | |
| Conservative | J. R. M. Baker | 56 | | |
| Majority | | 551 | | |
| Turnout | | | 13.4 | |
| Labour hold | | Swing | | |

Holy Trinity by-election, 24 September 1970
| Party | Candidate | Votes | % | ±% |
|---|---|---|---|---|
| Labour | I. P. McDougall | 667 | | |
| Communist | D. Lyons | 127 | | |
| Conservative | A. Heller | 64 | | |
| Majority | | 540 | | |
| Turnout | | | 11.1 | |
| Labour hold | | Swing | | |

Poplar East by-election, 24 September 1970
| Party | Candidate | Votes | % | ±% |
|---|---|---|---|---|
| Labour | P. Beasley | 1,223 | | |
| Conservative | R. W. Hartley | 69 | | |
| Union Movement | S. S. Bailey | 33 | | |
| Majority | | 1,154 | | |
| Turnout | | | 19.2 | |
| Labour hold | | Swing | | |

=== 1971-1974 ===
There were no by-elections.

=== 1974-1978 ===
Limehouse by-election, 20 March 1975
| Party | Candidate | Votes | % | ±% |
|---|---|---|---|---|
| Labour | John C. O'Neill | 776 | | |
| Liberal | Maurice Caplan | 289 | | |
| National Front | Frank C. Berry | 161 | | |
| Majority | | 487 | | |
| Turnout | | 7,101 | 17.3 | |
| Labour hold | | Swing | | |

Poplar South by-election, 31 March 1977
| Party | Candidate | Votes | % | ±% |
|---|---|---|---|---|
| Labour | Arthur Sanders | 551 | | |
| Conservative | Selwyn P. Williams | 227 | | |
| National Front | Frank C. Berry | 173 | | |
| Independent Labour | Victor J. Clark | 43 | | |
| Majority | | 324 | | |
| Turnout | | 4,333 | 23.0 | |
| Labour hold | | Swing | | |

Spitalfields by-election, 20 October 1977
| Party | Candidate | Votes | % | ±% |
|---|---|---|---|---|
| Labour | Geoffrey G. N. White | 816 | | |
| Socialist Unity | Hilda K. Kean | 242 | | |
| Conservative | Edna Hill | 133 | | |
| National Front | Beverley J. Matthews | 70 | | |
| Majority | | 574 | | |
| Turnout | | 5,573 | 22.8 | |
| Labour hold | | Swing | | |

=== 1978-1982 ===
Bow by-election, 6 March 1980
| Party | Candidate | Votes | % | ±% |
|---|---|---|---|---|
| Liberal | Felicity A. Coakley | 936 | | |
| Labour | Albert J. Snooks | 697 | | |
| Conservative | John S. Livingstone | 46 | | |
| National Front | Victor J. Clark | 43 | | |
| Majority | | 239 | | |
| Turnout | | 5,350 | 32.3 | |
| Liberal hold | | Swing | | |

The by-election was called following the resignation of Cllr Peter Gray.

Blackwall by-election, 9 July 1981
| Party | Candidate | Votes | % | ±% |
|---|---|---|---|---|
| Labour | John J. Boles | 512 | | |
| Conservative | Simon P. McCall | 105 | | |
| Independent Labour | Peter Read | 54 | | |
| National Front | Susan I. Clapp | 19 | | |
| Nationalist Party | George A. Williams | 12 | | |
| Majority | | 407 | | |
| Turnout | | 4,260 | 16.6 | |
| Labour hold | | Swing | | |

The by-election was called following the resignation of Cllr Arthur Sanders.

Weavers by-election, 9 July 1981
| Party | Candidate | Votes | % | ±% |
|---|---|---|---|---|
| Labour | Edward Bishop | 574 | | |
| National Front | Victor J. Clark | 95 | | |
| Conservative | Linda M. Archibald | 87 | | |
| Nationalist Party | Sheila Payne | 37 | | |
| Majority | | 479 | | |
| Turnout | | 6,994 | 11.5 | |
| Labour hold | | Swing | | |

The by-election was called following the resignation of Cllr Arthur Praag.

=== 1982-1986 ===
Grove by-election, 7 July 1983
| Party | Candidate | Votes | % | ±% |
|---|---|---|---|---|
| Liberal | Janet I. Ludlow | 1,105 | | |
| Labour | Belle Harris | 414 | | |
| Majority | | 691 | | |
| Turnout | | 3,771 | 40.4 | |
| Liberal hold | | Swing | | |

The by-election was called following the resignation of Cllr Edward Lewis.

Bromley by-election, 1 March 1984
| Party | Candidate | Votes | % | ±% |
|---|---|---|---|---|
| Liberal | Beryl Day | 1,461 | | |
| Labour | Neil J. McAree | 1,446 | | |
| Majority | | 17 | | |
| Turnout | | 6,892 | 42.3 | |
| Liberal gain from Labour | | Swing | | |

The by-election was called following the resignation of Cllr Patrick Desmond.

St Peter's by-election, 19 July 1984
| Party | Candidate | Votes | % | ±% |
|---|---|---|---|---|
| Liberal | Josie Curran | 1,324 | | |
| Labour | Albert C. Jacob | 779 | | |
| National Front | Raymond J. Bradford | 97 | | |
| Conservative | Robert J. Ingram | 73 | | |
| Majority | | 545 | | |
| Turnout | | 7,306 | 31.2 | |
| Liberal hold | | Swing | | |

The by-election was called following the resignation of Cllr Dennis Hallam.

Spitalfields by-election, 18 July 1985
| Party | Candidate | Votes | % | ±% |
|---|---|---|---|---|
| Labour | Abbas Uddin | 784 | | |
| Independent | Muhammad A. Hannan | 775 | | |
| Conservative | Peter J. Ainsworth | 174 | | |
| Majority | | 9 | | |
| Turnout | | 5,065 | 34.7 | |
| Labour hold | | Swing | | |

The by-election was called following the death of Cllr Annie Elboz.

Blackwall by-election, 12 September 1985
| Party | Candidate | Votes | % | ±% |
|---|---|---|---|---|
| Labour | Christine Shawcroft | 770 | | |
| Alliance | Jonathan P. Mathews | 645 | | |
| Conservative | Robert G. Hughes | 63 | | |
| BNP | David Ettridge | 33 | | |
| Majority | | 125 | | |
| Turnout | | 4,003 | 37.8 | |
| Labour hold | | Swing | | |

The by-election was called following the resignation of Cllr John Boles.

=== 1986-1990 ===
Holy Trinity by-election, 3 July 1986
| Party | Candidate | Votes | % | ±% |
|---|---|---|---|---|
| Liberal | Belinda J. Knowles | 1,642 | | |
| Labour | Michael S. Chalkey | 957 | | |
| National Front | Roger S. Evans | 138 | | |
| Conservative | Paul W. E. Ingham | 22 | | |
| Majority | | 685 | | |
| Turnout | | 6,851 | 40.6 | |
| Liberal hold | | Swing | | |

The by-election was called following the resignation of Cllr Belinda Knowles.

St Katharine's by-election, 22 September 1988
| Party | Candidate | Votes | % | ±% |
|---|---|---|---|---|
| Labour | John Biggs | 1,374 | | |
| SDP | Anhar Uddin | 485 | | |
| Conservative | Nick Gibb | 326 | | |
| Green | Derek England | 118 | | |
| Independent | Ronald W. Osborne | 50 | | |
| Majority | | 889 | | |
| Turnout | | 8,459 | 28.0 | |
| Labour hold | | Swing | | |

The by-election was called following the death of Cllr Mohammed Ahmed.

Lansbury by-election, 24 November 1988
| Party | Candidate | Votes | % | ±% |
|---|---|---|---|---|
| Labour | Stephen Bowen | 1,256 | | |
| Liberal Democrats | Peter J. Hughes | 1,164 | | |
| BNP | David Ettridge | 49 | | |
| Conservative | Thomas M. Taylor | 31 | | |
| Green | Derek England | 21 | | |
| SDP | Anthony L. Norton | 21 | | |
| Majority | | 92 | | |
| Turnout | | 6,479 | 39.4 | |
| Labour gain from Liberal | | Swing | | |

The by-election was called following the resignation of Cllr Pauline Fletcher.

=== 1990-1994 ===
Park by-election, 19 July 1990
| Party | Candidate | Votes | % | ±% |
|---|---|---|---|---|
| Liberal Democrats | Elizabeth Baunton | 779 | 50.5 | |
| Labour | Philip N. Royal | 598 | 38.8 | |
| BNP | Stephen Smith | 130 | 8.4 | |
| Green | Derek England | 18 | 1.2 | |
| Conservative | John Livingstone | 17 | 1.1 | |
| Majority | | 181 | 11.7 | |
| Turnout | | 4,271 | 36.4 | |
| Liberal Democrats hold | | Swing | | |

The by-election was called following the death of Cllr Margaret Atkins.

St Peter's by-election, 30 August 1990
| Party | Candidate | Votes | % | ±% |
|---|---|---|---|---|
| Labour | Suzanne Sullivan | 1,030 | 45.3 | |
| Liberal Democrats | Terence Cowley | 915 | 40.3 | |
| BNP | Kenneth Walsh | 275 | 12.1 | |
| Conservative | Sarah-Jane Quinlan | 53 | 2.3 | |
| Majority | | 115 | 5.0 | |
| Turnout | | 7,375 | 30.8 | |
| Labour gain from Lib Dem Focus Team | | Swing | | |

The by-election was called following the death of Cllr Brenda Collins.

Spitalfields by-election, 27 August 1992
| Party | Candidate | Votes | % | ±% |
|---|---|---|---|---|
| Labour | Syed A. Mizan | 1,098 | 64.0 | |
| Conservative | Mohammed S. Bakth | 536 | 31.2 | |
| BNP | Kenneth A. Walsh | 82 | 4.8 | |
| Majority | | 562 | 32.8 | |
| Turnout | | 5,501 | 31.2 | |
| Labour hold | | Swing | | |

The by-election was called following the resignation of Cllr Abbas Uddin.

Millwall by-election, 1 October 1992
| Party | Candidate | Votes | % | ±% |
|---|---|---|---|---|
| Labour | Edwin T. Johns | 1,275 | 38.7 | −6.3 |
| Lib Dem Focus Team | Jonathan P. Mathews | 1,178 | 35.8 | −4.1 |
| BNP | Barry J. Osborne | 657 | 20.0 | |
| Conservative | Jeremy P. Fage | 182 | 5.5 | −1.9 |
| Majority | | 97 | 2.9 | |
| Turnout | | 9,756 | 33.8 | |
| Labour hold | | Swing | | |

The by-election was called following the resignation of Cllr Ivan Walker.

Millwall by-election, 16 September 1993
| Party | Candidate | Votes | % | ±% |
|---|---|---|---|---|
| BNP | Derek Beackon | 1,480 | 33.8 | |
| Labour | James J. Hunt | 1,473 | 33.7 | −11.4 |
| Lib Dem Focus Team | Jennifer E. Mills | 1,284 | 29.6 | −10.6 |
| Conservative | Timothy R. Dickenson | 134 | 3.1 | −4.4 |
| Majority | | 7 | 0.1 | |
| Turnout | | 9,960 | 44.0 | |
| BNP gain from Labour | | Swing | | |

The by-election was called following the resignation of Cllr David Chapman.

=== 1994-1998 ===
Shadwell by-election, 15 September 1994
| Party | Candidate | Votes | % | ±% |
|---|---|---|---|---|
| Labour | Michael J. Keith | 1,783 | | |
| Liberal Democrats | Richard F. Roberts | 317 | | |
| BNP | Gordon Callow | 305 | | |
| Conservative | Paul W. E. Ingham | 74 | | |
| Majority | | 1,466 | | |
| Turnout | | 6,848 | 36.2 | |
| Labour hold | | Swing | | |

The by-election was called following the death of Cllr Albert Lilley.

Lansbury by-election, 15 December 1994
| Party | Candidate | Votes | % | ±% |
|---|---|---|---|---|
| Labour | Michael C. Keating | 1,457 | | |
| Liberal Democrats | Peter Hughes | 844 | | |
| BNP | Derek Beackon | 562 | | |
| Conservative | John S. Livingstone | 24 | | |
| Majority | | 613 | | |
| Turnout | | 5,832 | 49.5 | |
| Labour hold | | Swing | | |

The by-election was called following the resignation of Cllr Eric Commons.

Weavers by-election, 22 February 1995
| Party | Candidate | Votes | % | ±% |
|---|---|---|---|---|
| Labour | Mohammed Ali | 1,388 | | |
| Ind. Lib Dem | Terry B. Milson | 551 | | |
| BNP | David M. King | 486 | | |
| Liberal Democrats | Sajjad Miah | 482 | | |
| Militant Labour | Hugo C. Pierre | 112 | | |
| Majority | | 837 | | |
| Turnout | | 6,846 | 44.1 | |
| Labour hold | | Swing | | |

The by-election was called following the resignation of Cllr Vanessa Peters.

Limehouse by-election, 9 November 1995
| Party | Candidate | Votes | % | ±% |
|---|---|---|---|---|
| Labour | William E. Wakefield | 1,467 | | |
| Liberal Democrats | Paul A. Bargery | 625 | | |
| BNP | Gordon T. Callow | 147 | | |
| Conservative | David C. Hoile | 53 | | |
| Majority | | 842 | | |
| Turnout | | 5,877 | 39.0 | |
| Labour hold | | Swing | | |

The by-election was called following the resignation of Cllr John Ryan.

St Mary's by-election, 9 May 1996
| Party | Candidate | Votes | % | ±% |
|---|---|---|---|---|
| Labour | Judith A. Gardiner | 1,027 | 62.5 | |
| Liberal Democrats | James Langan | 267 | 16.3 | |
| Conservative | Reza A. Choudhury | 243 | 14.8 | |
| Militant Labour | Hugo C. Pierre | 106 | 6.4 | |
| Majority | | 760 | 46.2 | |
| Turnout | | 4,346 | 37.8 | |
| Labour hold | | Swing | | |

The by-election was called following the resignation of Cllr Amanda Linton.

=== 1998-2002 ===
Holy Trinity by-election, 28 June 2001
| Party | Candidate | Votes | % | ±% |
|---|---|---|---|---|
| Labour | Sirajul Islam | 1,081 | 53.5 | +11.5 |
| Liberal Democrats | Rosina S. Tucker | 817 | 40.5 | −2.9 |
| BNP | Lynda Miller | 74 | 3.7 | −1.0 |
| Socialist Alliance | Pauline Kempster | 47 | 2.3 | +2.3 |
| Majority | | 264 | 13.0 | |
| Turnout | | 2,019 | 27.1 | |
| Labour gain from Liberal Democrats | | Swing | | |

The by-election was called following the death of Cllr Albert Snooks.

=== 2002-2006 ===
Blackwall & Cubitt Town by-election, 27 June 2002
| Party | Candidate | Votes | % | ±% |
|---|---|---|---|---|
| Labour | Brian Son | 686 | 31.3 | −12.3 |
| Conservative | Timothy J. Archer | 676 | 30.8 | +2.5 |
| Liberal Democrats | Nurul Karim | 361 | 16.4 | −1.0 |
| Independent | Terry D. Johns | 252 | 11.5 | +0.8 |
| BNP | Gordon Callow | 87 | 4.0 | +4.0 |
| Independent | Eric Pemberton | 68 | 3.1 | +3.1 |
| Independent | Shah M. A. Haque | 21 | 1.0 | +1.0 |
| New Britain | Dennis Delderfield | 19 | 0.9 | +0.9 |
| Green | Keith O. Magnum | 16 | 0.7 | +0.7 |
| Socialist Alliance | Theresa R. Selby | 9 | 0.4 | +0.4 |
| Majority | | 10 | 0.5 | |
| Turnout | | 2,195 | 24.0 | |
| Labour hold | | Swing | | |

The by-election was called following the resignation of Cllr Lutfur Ali.

St Dunstans & Stepney Green by-election, 29 July 2004
| Party | Candidate | Votes | % | ±% |
|---|---|---|---|---|
| Respect | Oliur Rahman | 878 | 31.1 | +31.1 |
| Liberal Democrats | Jalal Uddin | 754 | 26.7 | +11.5 |
| Labour | Shah H. Rahman | 578 | 20.4 | −24.4 |
| Conservative | Alexander P. Story | 445 | 15.7 | −14.4 |
| National Front | Lynda Miller | 172 | 6.1 | +6.1 |
| Majority | | 124 | 4.4 | |
| Turnout | | 2,827 | 29.9 | |
| Respect gain from Labour | | Swing | | |

The by-election was called following the disqualification of Cllr Nasir Uddin.

Millwall by-election, 9 September 2004
| Party | Candidate | Votes | % | ±% |
|---|---|---|---|---|
| Conservative | Simon P. Rouse | 828 | 34.8 | +15.0 |
| Respect | Paul R. L. McGarr | 635 | 26.7 | +26.7 |
| Labour | John C. Cray | 571 | 24.0 | −24.4 |
| Independent | Andrew P. Sweeney | 195 | 8.2 | +8.2 |
| Liberal Democrats | Barry A. Blandford | 150 | 6.3 | −7.6 |
| Majority | | 193 | 8.1 | |
| Turnout | | 2,379 | 23.2 | |
| Conservative gain from Labour | | Swing | | |

The by-election was called following the resignation of Cllr Mumtaz Samad.

=== 2006-2010 ===
Shadwell by-election, 9 August 2007
| Party | Candidate | Votes | % | ±% |
|---|---|---|---|---|
| Respect | Harun Miah | 1,512 | 43.2 | −1.7 |
| Labour | Michael Keith | 1,415 | 40.4 | +9.2 |
| Conservative | William Crossey | 476 | 13.6 | −3.9 |
| Liberal Democrats | Rosie Clarke | 98 | 2.8 | −3.6 |
| Majority | | 97 | 2.8 | |
| Turnout | | 3,501 | 39.7 | |
| Respect hold | | Swing | | |

The by-election was called following the resignation of Cllr Shamin Chowdhury.

Millwall by-election, 1 May 2008
| Party | Candidate | Votes | % | ±% |
|---|---|---|---|---|
| Conservative | David A. Snowdon | 2,133 | 48.5 | +4.7 |
| Labour | Doros Ullah | 1,421 | 32.3 | +0.6 |
| Liberal Democrats | Mohammed N. Uddin | 370 | 8.4 | −0.7 |
| BNP | Jeffrey Marshall | 219 | 5.0 | +5.0 |
| Respect | Reza Mahbob | 170 | 3.9 | −11.5 |
| Left List | Rebecaa J. Townesend | 83 | 1.9 | +1.9 |
| Majority | | 712 | 16.2 | |
| Turnout | | 4,396 | 38.6 | |
| Conservative hold | | Swing | | |

The by-election was called following the resignation of Cllr Simon Rouse.

Weavers by-election, 1 May 2008
| Party | Candidate | Votes | % | ±% |
|---|---|---|---|---|
| Labour | Fazlul Haque | 1,421 | 37.4 | +18.3 |
| Liberal Democrats | John D. Griffiths | 930 | 24.5 | −16.2 |
| Respect | Dilwara Begum | 637 | 16.8 | −1.8 |
| Conservative | Gias U. Ahmed | 435 | 11.5 | +5.8 |
| BNP | Russell Pick | 154 | 4.1 | +4.1 |
| Independent | Sara A. J. Dixon | 143 | 3.8 | −3.9 |
| Independent | Niru Murshid | 77 | 2.0 | +2.0 |
| Majority | | 491 | 12.9 | |
| Turnout | | 3,797 | 47.7 | |
| Labour gain from Liberal Democrats | | Swing | | |

The by-election was called following the resignation of Cllr Louise Alexander.

Mile End East by-election, 20 November 2008
| Party | Candidate | Votes | % | ±% |
|---|---|---|---|---|
| Labour | Rachael Saunders | 1,208 | 47.3 | +18.5 |
| Conservative | Motiur Rahman | 630 | 24.7 | +13.7 |
| Respect | Hafiz Choudury | 604 | 23.7 | −0.9 |
| Liberal Democrats | Jainal Chowdury | 110 | 4.3 | −15.6 |
| Turnout | | | | |
| Labour hold | | Swing | 19.4 | |

The by-election was called following the resignation of Cllr Rupert Bawden.

=== 2010-2014 ===
Spitalfields & Banglatown by-election, 16 December 2010
| Party | Candidate | Votes | % | ±% |
|---|---|---|---|---|
| Respect | Fozol Miah | 666 | 45.4 | |
| Labour | Abdul Alim | 553 | 37.7 | |
| Conservative | Matt Smith | 135 | 9.2 | |
| Green | Maggie Crosbie | 52 | 3.5 | |
| Liberal Democrats | Ferdy North | 33 | 2.2 | |
| Independent | Jewel Choudhury | 28 | 1.9 | |
| Majority | | 113 | 7.7 | |
| Turnout | | 8,827 | 16.8 | |
| Respect gain from Labour | | Swing | 10.1 | |

The by-election was called following the resignation of Cllr Lutfur Rahman.

Spitalfields & Banglatown by-election, 19 April 2012
| Party | Candidate | Votes | % | ±% |
|---|---|---|---|---|
| Independent | Gulam Robbani | 1030 | | |
| Labour | Ala Uddin | 987 | | |
| Conservative | Matthew J. Smith | 140 | | |
| Green | Kirsty Blake | 99 | | |
| Liberal Democrats | Richard A. Macmillan | 39 | | |
| Turnout | | | 31.4% | |
| Independent hold | | Swing | | |

The by-election was called following the disqualification of Cllr Shelina Akhtar.

Weavers by-election, 3 May 2012
| Party | Candidate | Votes | % | ±% |
|---|---|---|---|---|
| Labour | John Pierce | 1544 | | |
| Respect | Abjol Miah | 1260 | | |
| Conservative | Caroline J. Kerswell | 415 | | |
| Green | Alan Duffel | 373 | | |
| Liberal Democrats | Azizur R. Khan | 208 | | |
| Independent | Oli Rothschild | 36 | | |
| Turnout | | | 44.6% | |
| Labour hold | | Swing | | |

The by-election was called following the resignation of Cllr Anna Lynch.

=== 2014–2018 ===
A by-election for the ward of Stepney Green was held on 11 June 2015, after the sitting councillor, Alibor Choudhury, was found guilty of corrupt and illegal practices by an election court.

Stepney Green by-election 11 June 2015
| Party | Candidate | Votes | % | ±% |
|---|---|---|---|---|
| Labour | Sabina Akhtar | 1,643 | 42.1 | −9.1 |
| Independent | Abu Chowdhury | 1,472 | 37.7 | N/A |
| Green | Kirsty Chestnutt | 272 | 7.0 | N/A |
| UKIP | Paul Shea | 203 | 5.2 | −2.9 |
| Conservative | Safiul Azam | 158 | 4.0 | −0.4 |
| Liberal Democrats | Will Dyer | 114 | 2.9 | −0.3 |
| Something New | Jessie Macneil-Brown | 40 | 1.0 | N/A |
| Majority | | 171 | 4.4 | |
| Turnout | | 3,902 | 47.3 | |
| Labour gain from Tower Hamlets First | | Swing | | |

A by-election for the ward of Whitechapel was held on 1 December 2016, after the sitting councillor, Shahed Ali, was found guilty of housing fraud. Another independent candidate, Ahmed Shafi, won the seat.

Whitechapel by-election 1 December 2016
| Party | Candidate | Votes | % | ±% |
|---|---|---|---|---|
| Independent | Shafi Ahmed | 1,147 | 42.7 | N/A |
| Labour | Victoria Obaze | 823 | 30.6 | −22.3 |
| Conservative | William Fletcher | 217 | 8.1 | +1.1 |
| Liberal Democrats | Emanuel Andejelic | 173 | 6.4 | −2.2 |
| Green | James Wilson | 170 | 6.3 | −2.4 |
| UKIP | Martin Smith | 156 | 5.8 | N/A |
| Majority | | 324 | | |
| Turnout | | 2,686 | 32.6 | |
| Independent gain from Labour | | Swing | | |

=== 2018-2022 ===
Lansbury by-election 7 February 2019
| Party | Candidate | Votes | % | ±% |
|---|---|---|---|---|
| Labour | Rajib Ahmed | 1,308 | 40.8 | +2.5 |
| Aspire | Ohid Ahmed | 1,002 | 31.3 | +7.0 |
| Liberal Democrats | Muhammad Asad | 290 | 9.0 | +0.0 |
| UKIP | Paul Shea | 176 | 5.5 | +5.5 |
| Conservative | Mumshad Afruz | 175 | 5.5 | −1.6 |
| Green | John Urpeth | 166 | 5.2 | −1.5 |
| The House Party Homes for Londoners | Terence McGrenera | 89 | 2.8 | +2.8 |
| Majority | | 306 | 9.5 | |
| Turnout | | 3,206 | | |
| Labour hold | | Swing | | |

The by-election was called following the resignation of Cllr Mohammad Harun.

Shadwell by-election 7 February 2019
| Party | Candidate | Votes | % | ±% |
|---|---|---|---|---|
| Aspire | Harun Miah | 1,012 | 34.8 | +13.3 |
| Labour | Asik Rahman | 914 | 31.5 | +4.0 |
| Liberal Democrats | Abjol Miah | 484 | 16.7 | +13.1 |
| Conservative | Daryl Stafford | 185 | 6.4 | +2.5 |
| Green | Tim Kiely | 125 | 4.3 | −0.1 |
| Independent | Kazi Gous-Miah | 119 | 4.1 | −1.2 |
| Women's Equality | Elena Scherbatykh | 65 | 2.2 | +2.2 |
| Majority | | 98 | 3.4 | |
| Turnout | | 2,904 | | |
| Aspire gain from Labour | | Swing | | |

The by-election was called following the resignation of Cllr Ruhul Amin.

Weavers by-election 12 August 2021
| Party | Candidate | Votes | % | ±% |
|---|---|---|---|---|
| Aspire | Kabir Ahmed | 1,204 | 46.5 | +31.4 |
| Labour | Nasrin Khanam | 742 | 28.6 | −21.8 |
| Conservative | Elliott Weaver | 360 | 13.9 | +7.6 |
| Green | Nathalie Bienfait | 205 | 7.9 | −1.8 |
| Liberal Democrats | Emanuel Andjelic | 50 | 1.9 | −5.7 |
| TUSC | Hugo Pierre | 30 | 1.2 | +1.2 |
| Majority | | 462 | 17.8 | |
| Turnout | | 2,591 | | |
| Aspire gain from Labour | | Swing | | |

The by-election was called following the death of Cllr John Pierce.

=== 2022-2026 ===
Bow East by-election 12 September 2024
| Party | Candidate | Votes | % | ±% |
|---|---|---|---|---|
| Labour | Abdi Mohamed | 1,266 | 53.3 | +6.1 |
| Green | Rupert George | 722 | 30.4 | +14.1 |
| Conservative | Robin Edwards | 239 | 10.1 | +4.4 |
| Liberal Democrats | Siobhan Proudfoot | 148 | 6.2 | −2.3 |
| Majority | | 544 | 22.9 | |
| Turnout | | 2,375 | | |
| Labour hold | | Swing | | |

The by-election was called following the resignation of Cllr Rachel Blake.
