= Bow South (ward) =

- Former electoral ward for the Tower Hamlets London Borough Council
- Borough: Tower Hamlets
- County: Greater London
- Population: 9,820 (1966 estimate)
- Electorate: 7,070 (1964); 6,182 (1968); 4,687 (1971); 4,687 (1974)
- Area: 235.2 acres (0.952 km^{2})

Former electoral ward
- Created: 1965
- Abolished: 1978
- Councillors: 3

External image
- Map showing Bow South ward boundaries from 1965 to 1978

Bow South was an electoral ward in the London Borough of Tower Hamlets. The ward was first used in the 1964 elections and last used for the 1974 elections. It returned councillors to Tower Hamlets London Borough Council.

== Tower Hamlets council elections ==
=== 1974 election ===
The election took place on 2 May 1974.

1974 Tower Hamlets London Borough Council election: Bow South (3)
Party	Candidate	Votes	%	±%
Labour	H. G. Hawksbee	uncontested		
Labour	W. T. Tuson	uncontested		
Labour	W. H. Woodley	uncontested		
Registered electors		4,687		
Labour hold		Swing		
Labour hold		Swing		
Labour hold		Swing		

=== 1971 election ===
The election took place on 13 May 1971.

1971 Tower Hamlets London Borough Council election: Bow South (3)
Party	Candidate	Votes	%	±%
Labour	K. A. Dodd	uncontested		
Labour	W. T. Tuson	uncontested		
Labour	J. E. Wiggins	uncontested		
Registered electors		4,687		
Labour hold		Swing		
Labour hold		Swing		
Labour hold		Swing		

=== 1968 election ===
The election took place on 9 May 1968.

1968 Tower Hamlets London Borough Council election: Bow South (3)
Party	Candidate	Votes	%	±%
Labour	K. A. Dodd	uncontested		
Labour	W. T. Tuson	uncontested		
Labour	J. E. Wiggins	uncontested		
Registered electors		6,182		
Labour hold		Swing		
Labour hold		Swing		
Labour hold		Swing		

=== 1964 election ===
The election took place on 7 May 1964.

1964 Tower Hamlets London Borough Council election: Bow South (3)
Party	Candidate	Votes	%	±%
Labour	T. E. Phillips	895		
Labour	W. T. Tuson	867		
Labour	G. W. Negus	855		
Conservative	A. J. Lawrence	235		
Conservative	B. Lawrence	210		
Conservative	R. F. Ludbrook	193		
Independent	C. A. Stevens	130		
Union Movement	F. C. Lang	117		
Communist	G. Collier	64		
Turnout				
Majority				
Labour win (new seat)				
Labour win (new seat)				
Labour win (new seat)				
