= Bow North (ward) =

- Former electoral ward for the Tower Hamlets London Borough Council
- Borough: Tower Hamlets
- County: Greater London
- Population: 6,350 (1966 estimate)
- Electorate: 5,135 (1964); 4,087 (1968); 4,415 (1971); 4,085 (1974)
- Area: 333.8 acres (1.351 km^{2})

Former electoral ward
- Created: 1965
- Abolished: 1978
- Councillors: 2

External image
- Map showing Bow North ward boundaries from 1965 to 1978

Bow North was an electoral ward in the London Borough of Tower Hamlets. The ward was first used in the 1964 elections and last used for the 1974 elections. It returned councillors to Tower Hamlets London Borough Council.

== Tower Hamlets council elections ==
=== 1974 election ===
The election took place on 2 May 1974.

1974 Tower Hamlets London Borough Council election: Bow North (2)
Party	Candidate	Votes	%	±%
Labour	T. J. Beningfield	uncontested		
Labour	E. C. Winterflood	uncontested		
Registered electors		4,085		
Labour hold		Swing		
Labour hold		Swing		

=== 1971 election ===
The election took place on 13 May 1971.

1971 Tower Hamlets London Borough Council election: Bow North (2)
Party	Candidate	Votes	%	±%
Labour	T. J. Beningfield	1,153		
Labour	E. C. Winterflood	1,124		
Conservative	J. Godden	81		
Conservative	D. L. Young	65		
Majority				
Turnout				
Labour hold		Swing		
Labour hold		Swing		

=== 1968 election ===
The election took place on 9 May 1968.

1968 Tower Hamlets London Borough Council election: Bow North (2)
Party	Candidate	Votes	%	±%
Labour	T. J. Beningfield	638		
Labour	E. C. Winterflood	599		
Conservative	R. C. Denney	306		
Conservative	R. W. Hartley	271		
Majority				
Turnout		4,087	23.2	
Labour hold		Swing		
Labour hold		Swing		

=== 1964 election ===
The election took place on 7 May 1964.

1964 Tower Hamlets London Borough Council election: Bow North (2)
Party	Candidate	Votes	%	±%
Labour	K. A. Dodd	579		
Labour	E. C. Winterflood	567		
Conservative	L. A. Dumont	79		
Majority				
Turnout				
Labour hold		Swing		
Labour hold		Swing		
