= Bethnal Green West (1965 ward) =

- Former electoral ward for the Tower Hamlets London Borough Council
- Borough: Tower Hamlets
- County: Greater London
- Population: 9,020 (1966 estimate)
- Electorate: 6,092 (1964); 6,175 (1968); 5,337 (1971); 4,790 (1974)
- Area: 145.7 acres (0.590 km^{2})

Former electoral ward
- Created: 1965
- Abolished: 1978
- Councillors: 3

External image
- Map showing Bethnal Green West ward boundaries from 1965 to 1978

Bethnal Green West was an electoral ward in the London Borough of Tower Hamlets. The ward was created in 1965 and abolished in 1978. It was first used in the 1964 elections and last used for the 1974 elections. It returned councillors to Tower Hamlets London Borough Council. In 2022, the ward of St Peter's was renamed and has since been called Bethnal Green West.

== Tower Hamlets council elections ==
=== 1974 election ===
The election took place on 2 May 1974.

1974 Tower Hamlets London Borough Council election: Bethnal Green West
Party	Candidate	Votes	%	±%
Labour	C. Main	Unopposed		
Labour	H. Moore	Unopposed		
Labour	A. Praag	Unopposed		
Registered electors		4,790		
Labour hold				
Labour hold				
Labour hold				

=== 1971 election ===
The election took place on 13 May 1971.

1971 Tower Hamlets London Borough Council election: Bethnal Green West
Party	Candidate	Votes	%	±%
Labour	L. Brazier	Unopposed		
Labour	C. Main	Unopposed		
Labour	H. Moore	Unopposed		
Registered electors		5,337		
Labour hold				
Labour hold				
Labour hold				

=== 1970 by-election ===
The by-election took place on 24 September 1970.

1970 Bethnal Green West by-election
Party	Candidate	Votes	%	±%
Labour	C. Main	633		
Liberal	C. Suett	82		
Conservative	J. Baker	56		
Majority		551		
Turnout			13.4	
Labour hold		Swing		

=== 1968 election ===
The election took place on 9 May 1968.

1968 Tower Hamlets London Borough Council election: Bethnal Green West
Party	Candidate	Votes	%	±%
Labour	A. Friedlander	Unopposed		
Labour	H. Moore	Unopposed		
Labour	A. Praag	Unopposed		
Registered electors		6,175		
Labour hold				
Labour hold				
Labour hold				

=== 1964 election ===
The election took place on 7 May 1964.

1964 Tower Hamlets London Borough Council election]: Bethnal Green West
Party	Candidate	Votes	%	±%
Labour	H. Moore	940		
Labour	A. Friedlander	910		
Labour	A. Praag	901		
Liberal	J. Fraser	161		
Liberal	D. Macdonald	155		
Liberal	J. Adams	143		
Communist	R. Rousay	119		
Turnout		1,188	19.5	
Labour win (new seat)				
Labour win (new seat)				
Labour win (new seat)				
