= Bethnal Green West =

Bethnal Green West could mean

- Bethnal Green West (1965 ward)
- Bethnal Green West (2014 ward)
