= Bethnal Green Central (ward) =

- Former electoral ward for the Tower Hamlets London Borough Council
- Borough: Tower Hamlets
- County: Greater London
- Population: 7,680 (1966 estimate)
- Electorate: 5,604 (1964); 5,799 (1968); 6,033 (1971); 5,379 (1974)
- Area: 121.5 acres (0.492 km^{2})

Former electoral ward
- Created: 1965
- Abolished: 1978
- Councillors: 3

External image
- Map showing Bethnal Green Central ward boundaries from 1965 to 1978

Bethnal Green Central was an electoral ward in the London Borough of Tower Hamlets. The ward was first used in the 1964 elections and last used for the 1974 elections. It returned councillors to Tower Hamlets London Borough Council.

== Tower Hamlets council elections ==
=== 1974 election ===
The election took place on 2 May 1974.

1974 Tower Hamlets London Borough Council election: Bethnal Green Central (3)
Party	Candidate	Votes	%	±%
Labour	H. Brazier	600		
Labour	H. Morsman	588		
Labour	T. Crudgington	570		
Conservative	Elizabeth Hartley	135		
Conservative	Ernest Hartley	115		
Majority				
Turnout		5,379	14.7	
Labour hold		Swing		
Labour hold		Swing		
Labour hold		Swing		

=== 1971 election ===
The election took place on 13 May 1971.

1971 Tower Hamlets London Borough Council election: Bethnal Green Central (3)
Party	Candidate	Votes	%	±%
Labour	J. Docherty	1,283		
Labour	D. Couling	1,220		
Labour	H. Morsman	1,132		
Independent	G. Abercrombie	398		
Conservative	R. Mitchell	271		
Conservative	P. Wood	215		
Conservative	L. Pask	182		
Majority				
Turnout				
Labour hold		Swing		
Labour hold		Swing		
Labour hold		Swing		

=== 1968 election ===
The election took place on 9 May 1968.

1968 Tower Hamlets London Borough Council election: Bethnal Green Central (3)
Party	Candidate	Votes	%	±%
Labour	J. Docherty	591		
Labour	D. Couling	576		
Labour	H. Morsman	570		
Conservative	R. Mitchell	499		
Conservative	J. Baker	465		
Conservative	E. Isaacs	452		
Majority				
Turnout		5,799	19.4	
Labour hold		Swing		
Labour hold		Swing		
Labour hold		Swing		

=== 1964 election ===
The election took place on 7 May 1964.

1964 Tower Hamlets London Borough Council election: Bethnal Green Central (3)
Party	Candidate	Votes	%	±%
Labour	D. Couling	uncontested		
Labour	W. Griffiths	uncontested		
Labour	H. Morsman	uncontested		
Registered electors		5,604		
Labour win (new seat)				
Labour win (new seat)				
Labour win (new seat)				
