= 1964 Westminster City Council election =

1964 local election in England

| 7 May 1964 | 1968 → |

All 60 council seats of the Westminster City Council 31 seats needed for a majority
Subsequent council control
Conservative

The 1964 Westminster Council election took place on 7 May 1964 to elect members of Westminster City Council in London, England. The whole council was up for election and the Conservative party gained control of the council.

== Background ==
These elections were the first to the newly formed borough. Previously elections had taken place in the Metropolitan Borough of Paddington, Metropolitan Borough of St Marylebone and Metropolitan Borough of Westminster. These boroughs were joined to form the new London Borough of Westminster by the London Government Act 1963.

A total of 155 candidates stood in the election for the 60 seats being contested across 31 wards. These included a full slate from the Conservative and Labour parties, while the Liberals stood 31 candidates. Other candidates included 4 from the Communist party. There were 20 single-seat wards, 6 three-seat wards, 4 five-seat wards and 1 two-seat ward.

This election had aldermen as well as directly elected councillors. The Conservatives got 7 aldermen and Labour 3.

The Council was elected in 1964 as a "shadow authority" but did not start operations until 1 April 1965.

== Election result ==
The results saw the Conservatives gain the new council with a majority of 22 after winning 41 of the 60 seats. Overall turnout in the election was 28.0%. This turnout included 1,343 postal votes.

== Ward results ==
=== Abbey ===
Abbey (1)
| Party | Candidate | Votes | % | ±% |
|---|---|---|---|---|
| Labour | T. J. H. Bishop | 524 | | |
| Conservative | L. B. Farmiloe | 471 | | |
| Turnout | | 1,000 | 38.4 | |
| Labour win (new seat) | | | | |

=== Alderney ===
Alderney (1)
| Party | Candidate | Votes | % | ±% |
|---|---|---|---|---|
| Labour | E. A. Bramall | 789 | | |
| Conservative | A. J. Hardiman | 762 | | |
| Liberal | Miss P. M. Andrews | 27 | | |
| Turnout | | 1,595 | 41.2 | |
| Labour win (new seat) | | | | |

=== Aldwych ===
Aldwych (1)
| Party | Candidate | Votes | % | ±% |
|---|---|---|---|---|
| Conservative | H. G. Cubitt | 549 | | |
| Labour | J. J. Curran | 454 | | |
| Turnout | | 1,012 | 36.4 | |
| Conservative win (new seat) | | | | |

=== Baker Street ===
Baker Street (5)
| Party | Candidate | Votes | % | ±% |
|---|---|---|---|---|
| Conservative | G. I. Harley | 2,221 | | |
| Conservative | C. T. Hesketh | 2,221 | | |
| Conservative | R. T. Glenny | 2,220 | | |
| Conservative | J. G. Mordue | 2,196 | | |
| Conservative | Miss D. W. Doyle | 2,180 | | |
| Labour | K. A. Hardacre | 705 | | |
| Labour | Mrs. C. S. Heller | 694 | | |
| Labour | P. O. Phillips | 689 | | |
| Labour | Mrs. D. M. Mackay | 686 | | |
| Labour | Mrs. A. C. Walters | 678 | | |
| Liberal | Mrs. A. D. Gardiner | 387 | | |
| Liberal | A. M. Gerrard | 367 | | |
| Liberal | P. Freitag | 366 | | |
| Liberal | I. A. Noble | 343 | | |
| Liberal | M. Janis | 333 | | |
| Turnout | | 3,324 | 24.1 | |
| Conservative win (new seat) | | | | |
| Conservative win (new seat) | | | | |
| Conservative win (new seat) | | | | |
| Conservative win (new seat) | | | | |
| Conservative win (new seat) | | | | |

=== Berkeley ===
Berkeley (1)
| Party | Candidate | Votes | % | ±% |
|---|---|---|---|---|
| Conservative | J. C. Wells | 603 | | |
| Labour | G. L. McDermott | 22 | | |
| Liberal | Mrs. B. J. Capel | 21 | | |
| Turnout | | 651 | 20.3 | |
| Conservative win (new seat) | | | | |

=== Cathedral ===
Cathedral (1)
| Party | Candidate | Votes | % | ±% |
|---|---|---|---|---|
| Conservative | Miss P. C. Paton Walsh | 792 | | |
| Labour | J. P. Duffy | 258 | | |
| Liberal | Miss U. A. C. Alder | 109 | | |
| Turnout | | 1,170 | 27.1 | |
| Conservative win (new seat) | | | | |

=== Cavendish ===
Cavendish (3)
| Party | Candidate | Votes | % | ±% |
|---|---|---|---|---|
| Conservative | J. E. Guest | 1,681 | | |
| Conservative | H. K. Ashworth | 1,671 | | |
| Conservative | L. Pearl | 1,669 | | |
| Labour | Countess of Lucan | 601 | | |
| Labour | Mrs. R. N. Grenville | 573 | | |
| Labour | D. B. Fraser | 572 | | |
| Turnout | | 2,295 | 22.1 | |
| Conservative win (new seat) | | | | |
| Conservative win (new seat) | | | | |
| Conservative win (new seat) | | | | |

=== Churchill ===
Churchill (1)
| Party | Candidate | Votes | % | ±% |
|---|---|---|---|---|
| Labour | Mrs. G. M. Bramall | 1,089 | | |
| Conservative | Miss A. M. Tennant | 824 | | |
| Liberal | P. J. Ogilvie | 53 | | |
| Turnout | | 1,978 | 47.5 | |
| Labour win (new seat) | | | | |

=== Church Street ===
Church Street (3)
| Party | Candidate | Votes | % | ±% |
|---|---|---|---|---|
| Labour | Dr. L. Jacobs | 1,807 | | |
| Labour | Mrs. J. Merriton | 1,678 | | |
| Labour | R. C. Edmonds | 1,669 | | |
| Conservative | Miss J. M. Pearson | 774 | | |
| Conservative | C. L. Gimblett | 773 | | |
| Conservative | K. S. Solomons | 761 | | |
| Communist | L. R. Temple | 218 | | |
| Turnout | | 2,654 | 30.0 | |
| Labour win (new seat) | | | | |
| Labour win (new seat) | | | | |
| Labour win (new seat) | | | | |

=== Covent Garden ===
Covent Garden (1)
| Party | Candidate | Votes | % | ±% |
|---|---|---|---|---|
| Conservative | J. L. C. Dribbell | 261 | | |
| Labour | Mrs. I. J. Griffiths | 80 | | |
| Turnout | | 344 | 16.1 | |
| Conservative win (new seat) | | | | |

=== Dolphin ===
Dolphin (1)
| Party | Candidate | Votes | % | ±% |
|---|---|---|---|---|
| Conservative | M. F. Rawlence | 806 | | |
| Labour | W. H. Wheeler | 322 | | |
| Liberal | W. D. Ainger | 80 | | |
| Turnout | | 1,218 | 29.2 | |
| Conservative win (new seat) | | | | |

=== Eaton ===
Eaton (1)
| Party | Candidate | Votes | % | ±% |
|---|---|---|---|---|
| Conservative | C. A. Prendergast | 761 | | |
| Labour | L. G. Harris | 81 | | |
| Liberal | P. J. C. Howgego | 16 | | |
| Turnout | | 864 | 25.8 | |
| Conservative win (new seat) | | | | |

=== Ebury ===
Ebury (1)
| Party | Candidate | Votes | % | ±% |
|---|---|---|---|---|
| Conservative | G. C. L. Gay | 752 | | |
| Labour | G. Wilson | 661 | | |
| Liberal | Mrs. G. S. Howgego | 31 | | |
| Turnout | | 1,457 | 48.0 | |
| Conservative win (new seat) | | | | |

=== Grosvenor ===
Grosvenor (1)
| Party | Candidate | Votes | % | ±% |
|---|---|---|---|---|
| Conservative | Miss E. A. Marsh | 596 | | |
| Labour | B. C. G. Whitaker | 104 | | |
| Liberal | N. H. Barnes | 39 | | |
| Turnout | | 743 | 23.2 | |
| Conservative win (new seat) | | | | |

=== Harrow Road ===
Harrow Road (5)
| Party | Candidate | Votes | % | ±% |
|---|---|---|---|---|
| Labour | G. F. Bulmer | 2,265 | | |
| Labour | H. E. Browne | 2,257 | | |
| Labour | W. D. Goss | 2,249 | | |
| Labour | I. Harrington | 2,243 | | |
| Labour | A. A. Dumont | 2,240 | | |
| Conservative | S. W. Y. Cottrell | 843 | | |
| Conservative | H. H. Hodgson | 757 | | |
| Conservative | L. T. Sheldrake | 726 | | |
| Conservative | M. P. Nulloth | 722 | | |
| Conservative | A. J. Welch | 710 | | |
| Communist | R. Vizard | 164 | | |
| Turnout | | 3,178 | 20.2 | |
| Labour win (new seat) | | | | |
| Labour win (new seat) | | | | |
| Labour win (new seat) | | | | |
| Labour win (new seat) | | | | |
| Labour win (new seat) | | | | |

=== Hyde Park ===
Hyde Park (5)
| Party | Candidate | Votes | % | ±% |
|---|---|---|---|---|
| Conservative | J. Gillett | 2,369 | | |
| Conservative | Miss C. P. Rabagliati | 2,328 | | |
| Conservative | D. McNair | 2,327 | | |
| Conservative | W. Parkes | 2,301 | | |
| Conservative | J. Collins | 2,293 | | |
| Labour | J. S. Doran | 963 | | |
| Labour | C. F. H. Wegg-Prosser | 943 | | |
| Labour | Miss E. R. Gray | 926 | | |
| Labour | J. T. Dunn | 923 | | |
| Labour | S. Nagendra | 881 | | |
| Turnout | | 3,344 | 23.6 | |
| Conservative win (new seat) | | | | |
| Conservative win (new seat) | | | | |
| Conservative win (new seat) | | | | |
| Conservative win (new seat) | | | | |
| Conservative win (new seat) | | | | |

=== Knightsbridge ===
Knightsbridge (1)
| Party | Candidate | Votes | % | ±% |
|---|---|---|---|---|
| Conservative | A. L. Burton | 852 | | |
| Labour | Mrs. M. E. Garside | 42 | | |
| Liberal | Arthur W. Capel | 38 | | |
| Turnout | | 935 | 25.6 | |
| Conservative win (new seat) | | | | |

=== Lancaster Gate ===
Lancaster Gate (3)
| Party | Candidate | Votes | % | ±% |
|---|---|---|---|---|
| Conservative | M. V. Kenyon | 1,752 | | |
| Conservative | M. W. Lowry-Corry | 1,749 | | |
| Conservative | J. Lugton | 1,720 | | |
| Labour | K. Richardson | 795 | | |
| Labour | C. W. Clark | 784 | | |
| Labour | F. W. Hedges | 780 | | |
| Turnout | | 2,552 | 23.4 | |
| Conservative win (new seat) | | | | |
| Conservative win (new seat) | | | | |
| Conservative win (new seat) | | | | |

=== Lords ===
Lords (3)
| Party | Candidate | Votes | % | ±% |
|---|---|---|---|---|
| Conservative | R. M. Dawe | 2,124 | | |
| Conservative | H. H. Sandford | 2,114 | | |
| Conservative | Mrs. S. E. de K. Rivington | 2,109 | | |
| Labour | D. J. Cocks | 726 | | |
| Labour | R. N. Wood | 723 | | |
| Labour | Miss M. N. Rendal | 719 | | |
| Liberal | M. Cummins | 399 | | |
| Liberal | A. Lea | 363 | | |
| Liberal | K. G. Faircloth | 356 | | |
| Turnout | | 3,271 | 22.6 | |
| Conservative win (new seat) | | | | |
| Conservative win (new seat) | | | | |
| Conservative win (new seat) | | | | |

=== Maida Vale ===
Maida Vale (5)
| Party | Candidate | Votes | % | ±% |
|---|---|---|---|---|
| Conservative | R. B. Brown | 2,814 | | |
| Conservative | W. F. Brooks | 2,774 | | |
| Conservative | Mrs. E. G. Lane | 2,765 | | |
| Conservative | J. M. Shersby | 2,747 | | |
| Conservative | G. J. O’Connell | 2,739 | | |
| Labour | K. E. Dickinson | 2,504 | | |
| Labour | R. Whyte | 2,493 | | |
| Labour | J. Cooze | 2,489 | | |
| Labour | Mrs. G. E. Haywood | 2,472 | | |
| Labour | E. W. Wellin | 2,452 | | |
| Liberal | Miss M. Charlesworth | 431 | | |
| Liberal | D. B. Griffiths | 394 | | |
| Liberal | S. M. Cowan | 392 | | |
| Liberal | L. Epsztein | 370 | | |
| Liberal | M. G. Rabin | 364 | | |
| Turnout | | 5,775 | 35.1 | |
| Conservative win (new seat) | | | | |
| Conservative win (new seat) | | | | |
| Conservative win (new seat) | | | | |
| Conservative win (new seat) | | | | |
| Conservative win (new seat) | | | | |

=== Millbank ===
Millbank (1)
| Party | Candidate | Votes | % | ±% |
|---|---|---|---|---|
| Labour | A. A. Jelley | 719 | | |
| Conservative | K. F. Creighton | 587 | | |
| Liberal | A. E. Harris | 216 | | |
| Turnout | | 1,545 | 36.3 | |
| Labour win (new seat) | | | | |

=== Queen's Park ===
Queen's Park (2)
| Party | Candidate | Votes | % | ±% |
|---|---|---|---|---|
| Labour | G. Lowe | 1,694 | | |
| Labour | Mrs. I. L. Bolton | 1,665 | | |
| Conservative | W. A. Bratton | 343 | | |
| Conservative | E. W. White | 321 | | |
| Liberal | J. A. Gibbons | 154 | | |
| Liberal | Mrs. M. I. Singer | 133 | | |
| Turnout | | 2,186 | 32.9 | |
| Labour win (new seat) | | | | |
| Labour win (new seat) | | | | |

=== Regent Street ===
Regent Street (1)
| Party | Candidate | Votes | % | ±% |
|---|---|---|---|---|
| Conservative | R. F. Shaw-Kennedy | 319 | | |
| Labour | F. B. Groves | 80 | | |
| Turnout | | 400 | 17.8 | |
| Conservative win (new seat) | | | | |

=== Regent's Park ===
Regent's Park (3)
| Party | Candidate | Votes | % | ±% |
|---|---|---|---|---|
| Conservative | E. L. Hancock | 1,661 | | |
| Conservative | R. W. Forrester | 1,635 | | |
| Conservative | Miss J. C. Marsh | 1,629 | | |
| Labour | R. D. Powell | 934 | | |
| Labour | C. D. Dennington | 932 | | |
| Labour | W. Robins | 923 | | |
| Communist | Mrs. C. S. Rabstein | 112 | | |
| Turnout | | 2,646 | 28.0 | |
| Conservative win (new seat) | | | | |
| Conservative win (new seat) | | | | |
| Conservative win (new seat) | | | | |

=== St James's ===
St James's (1)
| Party | Candidate | Votes | % | ±% |
|---|---|---|---|---|
| Conservative | M. D. N. Cobbold | 335 | | |
| Liberal | G. D. Bucklebridge | 23 | | |
| Labour | P. M. Aldis | 19 | | |
| Turnout | | 380 | 16.5 | |
| Conservative win (new seat) | | | | |

=== Soho ===
Soho (1)
| Party | Candidate | Votes | % | ±% |
|---|---|---|---|---|
| Labour | R. V. Mares | 426 | | |
| Conservative | H. Stern | 381 | | |
| Turnout | | 813 | 27.5 | |
| Labour win (new seat) | | | | |

=== Tachbrook ===
Tachbrook (1)
| Party | Candidate | Votes | % | ±% |
|---|---|---|---|---|
| Labour | H. G. Garside | 803 | | |
| Conservative | A. F. E. Johnston | 734 | | |
| Turnout | | 1,549 | 46.3 | |
| Labour win (new seat) | | | | |

=== Victoria ===
Victoria (1)
| Party | Candidate | Votes | % | ±% |
|---|---|---|---|---|
| Conservative | G. B. Pugh | 457 | | |
| Labour | Miss D. H. Sylven | 87 | | |
| Turnout | | 545 | 21.4 | |
| Conservative win (new seat) | | | | |

=== Warwick ===
Warwick (1)
| Party | Candidate | Votes | % | ±% |
|---|---|---|---|---|
| Conservative | S. Le Marchant | 684 | | |
| Labour | L. F. Squires | 248 | | |
| Liberal | Miss B. R. Karmel | 43 | | |
| Turnout | | 986 | 23.9 | |
| Conservative win (new seat) | | | | |

=== Westbourne ===
Westbourne (3)
| Party | Candidate | Votes | % | ±% |
|---|---|---|---|---|
| Labour | W. Dow | 1,667 | | |
| Labour | C. H. Genese | 1,614 | | |
| Labour | E. R. Packer | 1,606 | | |
| Conservative | P. J. Crawford | 801 | | |
| Conservative | C. C. Chalker | 789 | | |
| Conservative | R. S. Price | 766 | | |
| Liberal | A. J. R. Nolan | 143 | | |
| Liberal | A. C. Durie | 135 | | |
| Liberal | R. J. Ballinger | 121 | | |
| Communist | J. C. Spring | 107 | | |
| Turnout | | 2,645 | 25.5 | |
| Labour win (new seat) | | | | |
| Labour win (new seat) | | | | |
| Labour win (new seat) | | | | |

=== Wilton ===
Wilton (1)
| Party | Candidate | Votes | % | ±% |
|---|---|---|---|---|
| Conservative | G. H. M. Pirie | 488 | | |
| Liberal | J. C. Atkinson | 36 | | |
| Labour | Miss R. H. Allan | 22 | | |
| Turnout | | 548 | 21.8 | |
| Conservative win (new seat) | | | | |
