= 1964 Tower Hamlets London Borough Council election =

1964 local election in England

7 May 1964	1968 →

All 60 council seats of the Tower Hamlets London Borough Council 31 seats needed for a majority
Subsequent council control
Labour

The 1964 Tower Hamlets Council election took place on 7 May 1964 to elect members of Tower Hamlets London Borough Council in London, England. The whole council was up for election and the Labour party won control.

== Background ==
These elections were the first to the newly formed borough council. Previously elections had taken place in the Metropolitan Borough of Bethnal Green, Metropolitan Borough of Poplar and Metropolitan Borough of Stepney. These boroughs were joined to form the new London Borough of Tower Hamlets by the London Government Act 1963.

A total of 115 candidates stood for the 60 seats, across 20 wards. 6 seats in two wards were uncontested. The Labour party fielded a full slate of candidates, while the Liberal and Conservative parties stood 19 and 17 respectively. Other candidates included 13 Communists, 2 Residents, 2 Union Movement, 1 Independent and 1 Independent Labour Party. There were 14 three-seat wards, 3 four-seat wards and 3 two-seat wards.

This election had aldermen as well as directly elected councillors. Labour got all 10 aldermen.

The Council was elected in 1964 as a "shadow authority" but did not start operations until 1 April 1965.

== Election result ==
The results saw Labour win 55 of the 60 seats, Communists 3 and Residents 2. Conservative and Liberal candidates failed to win any seats. Overall turnout in the election was 16.9%. This turnout included 197 postal votes.

== Ward results ==
=== Bethnal Green Central ===
Bethnal Green Central (3)
Party	Candidate	Votes	%	±%
Labour	D. M. Couling	uncontested		
Labour	W. J. Griffiths	uncontested		
Labour	H. Morsman	uncontested		
Registered electors		5,604		
Labour win (new seat)				
Labour win (new seat)				
Labour win (new seat)				

=== Bethnal Green East ===
Bethnal Green East (3)
Party	Candidate	Votes	%	±%
Turnout		No contest	n/a	
	Labour win (new seat)			
	Labour win (new seat)			
	Labour win (new seat)			

=== Bethnal Green North ===
Bethnal Green North (3)
Party	Candidate	Votes	%	±%
Turnout		1,066	17.2	
	Labour win (new seat)			
	Labour win (new seat)			
	Labour win (new seat)			

=== Bethnal Green South ===
Bethnal Green South (3)
Party	Candidate	Votes	%	±%
Turnout		1,244	18.4	
	Labour win (new seat)			
	Labour win (new seat)			
	Labour win (new seat)			

=== Bethnal Green West ===
Bethnal Green West (3)
Party	Candidate	Votes	%	±%
Labour	H. Moore	940	79.12	N/A
Labour	A. Friedlander	910	76.60	N/A
Labour	A. Praag	901	75.84	N/A
Liberal	J. Fraser	161	13.55	N/A
Liberal	D. Macdonald	155	13.05	N/A
Liberal	J. Adams	143	12.04	N/A
Communist	R. Rousay	119	10.02	N/A
Turnout		1,188	19.5	N/A
Labour win (new seat)				
Labour win (new seat)				
Labour win (new seat)				

=== Bow North ===
Bow North (2)
Party	Candidate	Votes	%	±%
Labour	K. A. Dodd	579		
Labour	E. C. Winterflood	567		
Conservative	L. A. Dumont	79		
Majority				
Turnout				
Labour hold		Swing		
Labour hold		Swing		

=== Bow South ===
Bow South (3)
Party	Candidate	Votes	%	±%
Labour	T. E. Phillips	895		
Labour	W. T. Tuson	867		
Labour	G. W. Negus	855		
Conservative	A. J. Lawrence	235		
Conservative	B. Lawrence	210		
Conservative	R. F. Ludbrook	193		
Independent	C. A. Stevens	130		
Union Movement	F. C. Lang	117		
Communist	G. Collier	64		
Turnout				
Majority				
Labour win (new seat)				
Labour win (new seat)				
Labour win (new seat)				

=== Bromley ===
Bromley (3)
Party	Candidate	Votes	%	±%
Turnout		1,085	15.8	
	Labour win (new seat)			
	Labour win (new seat)			
	Labour win (new seat)			

=== Holy Trinity ===
Holy Trinity (3)
Party	Candidate	Votes	%	±%
Turnout		1,288	16.1	
	Labour win (new seat)			
	Labour win (new seat)			
	Labour win (new seat)			

=== Limehouse ===
Limehouse (4)
Party	Candidate	Votes	%	±%
Turnout		1,302	14.0	
	Labour win (new seat)			
	Labour win (new seat)			
	Labour win (new seat)			
	Labour win (new seat)			

=== Poplar East ===
Poplar East (3)
Party	Candidate	Votes	%	±%
Turnout		1,279	19.3	
	Labour win (new seat)			
	Labour win (new seat)			
	Labour win (new seat)			

=== Poplar Millwall ===
Poplar Millwall (2)
Party	Candidate	Votes	%	±%
Turnout		1,933	33.7	
	Residents win (new seat)			
	Residents win (new seat)			

=== Poplar South ===
Poplar South (2)
Party	Candidate	Votes	%	±%
Turnout		946	17.6	
	Labour win (new seat)			
	Labour win (new seat)			

=== Poplar West ===
Poplar West (3)
Party	Candidate	Votes	%	±%
Turnout		1,114	14.2	
	Labour win (new seat)			
	Labour win (new seat)			
	Labour win (new seat)			

=== Redcoat ===
Redcoat (3)
Party	Candidate	Votes	%	±%
Turnout		863	12.7	
	Labour win (new seat)			
	Labour win (new seat)			
	Labour win (new seat)			

=== St Dunstan's ===
St Dunstan's (3)
Party	Candidate	Votes	%	±%
Turnout		854	13.2	
	Labour win (new seat)			
	Labour win (new seat)			
	Labour win (new seat)			

=== St Katherine's ===
St Katherine's (4)
Party	Candidate	Votes	%	±%
Turnout		1,274	15.6	
	Labour win (new seat)			
	Labour win (new seat)			
	Labour win (new seat)			
	Labour win (new seat)			

=== St Mary's ===
St Mary's (3)
Party	Candidate	Votes	%	±%
Communist	Solly Kaye	670		
Communist	B. Borman	636		
Communist	P. Roche	542		
Labour	A. Bermel	522		
Labour	A. Butler	507		
Labour	J. P. Duggan	477		
Liberal	M. Dove	250		
Liberal	T. Bond	220		
Liberal	S. H. Woodham	209		
Turnout		1,394	24.6	
Communist win (new seat)				
Communist win (new seat)				
Communist win (new seat)				

=== Shadwell ===
Shadwell (3)
Party	Candidate	Votes	%	±%
Labour	R. J. Connolly	877		
Labour	F. G. Spearing	863		
Labour	R. Cockell	839		
Communist	F. Whipple	137		
Turnout				
Labour win (new seat)				
Labour win (new seat)				
Labour win (new seat)				

=== Spitalfields ===
Spitalfields (4)
Party	Candidate	Votes	%	±%
Turnout		1,363	15.0	
	Labour win (new seat)			
	Labour win (new seat)			
	Labour win (new seat)			
	Labour win (new seat)			
