= 1964 Waltham Forest London Borough Council election =

The 1964 Waltham Forest Council election took place on 7 May 1964 to elect members of Waltham Forest London Borough Council in London, England. The whole council was up for election and the Labour party gained control of the council.

== Background ==
These elections were the first to the newly formed borough. Previously elections had taken place in the Municipal Borough of Chingford, Municipal Borough of Leyton and Municipal Borough of Walthamstow. These boroughs were joined to form the new London Borough of Waltham Forest by the London Government Act 1963.

A total of 161 candidates stood in the election for the 48 seats being contested across 16 wards. These included a full slate from the Labour and Liberal parties, while the Conservatives stood 42 candidates. Other candidates included 18 Residents and 5 Communists. All wards were three-seat wards.

This election had aldermen as well as directly elected councillors. Labour got all 8 aldermen.

The Council was elected in 1964 as a "shadow authority" but did not start operations until 1 April 1965.

== Election result ==
The results saw Labour gain the new council with a majority of 24 after winning 36 of the 48 seats. Overall turnout in the election was 32.0%. This turnout included 716 postal votes.

== Ward results ==
Cann Hall (3)
Party	Candidate	Votes	%	±%
Turnout		2,601	22.8	
	Labour win (new seat)			
	Labour win (new seat)			
	Labour win (new seat)			

Central (3)
Party	Candidate	Votes	%	±%
Turnout		3,430	30.3	
	Labour win (new seat)			
	Labour win (new seat)			
	Labour win (new seat)			

Chapel End (3)
Party	Candidate	Votes	%	±%
Turnout		4,119	38.6	
	Labour win (new seat)			
	Labour win (new seat)			
	Labour win (new seat)			

Chingford Central (3)
Party	Candidate	Votes	%	±%
Turnout		4,682	41.1	
	Residents win (new seat)			
	Residents win (new seat)			
	Residents win (new seat)			

Chingford North West (3)
Party	Candidate	Votes	%	±%
Turnout		4,020	36.0	
	Residents win (new seat)			
	Residents win (new seat)			
	Residents win (new seat)			

Chingford South (3)
Party	Candidate	Votes	%	±%
Turnout		4,211	41.6	
	Residents win (new seat)			
	Residents win (new seat)			
	Residents win (new seat)			

Forest (3)
Party	Candidate	Votes	%	±%
Turnout		3,912	34.6	
	Labour win (new seat)			
	Labour win (new seat)			
	Labour win (new seat)			

Hale End (3)
Party	Candidate	Votes	%	±%
Turnout		4,970	44.8	
	Conservative win (new seat)			
	Conservative win (new seat)			
	Conservative win (new seat)			

High Street (3)
Party	Candidate	Votes	%	±%
Turnout		2,882	28.0	
	Labour win (new seat)			
	Labour win (new seat)			
	Labour win (new seat)			

Higham Hill (3)
Party	Candidate	Votes	%	±%
Turnout		3,192	24.9	
	Labour win (new seat)			
	Labour win (new seat)			
	Labour win (new seat)			

Hoe Street (3)
Party	Candidate	Votes	%	±%
Turnout		3,355	28.8	
	Labour win (new seat)			
	Labour win (new seat)			
	Labour win (new seat)			

Lea Bridge (3)
Party	Candidate	Votes	%	±%
Turnout		2,893	25.6	
	Labour win (new seat)			
	Labour win (new seat)			
	Labour win (new seat)			

Leyton (3)
Party	Candidate	Votes	%	±%
Turnout		2,472	22.6	
	Labour win (new seat)			
	Labour win (new seat)			
	Labour win (new seat)			

Leytonstone (3)
Party	Candidate	Votes	%	±%
Turnout		3,145	28.6	
	Labour win (new seat)			
	Labour win (new seat)			
	Labour win (new seat)			

St James Street (3)
Party	Candidate	Votes	%	±%
Turnout		2,869	31.0	
	Labour win (new seat)			
	Labour win (new seat)			
	Labour win (new seat)			

Wood Street (3)
Party	Candidate	Votes	%	±%
Turnout		3,589	33.9	
	Labour win (new seat)			
	Labour win (new seat)			
	Labour win (new seat)			
