= 1964 Kingston upon Thames London Borough Council election =

The 1964 Kingston upon Thames Council election took place on 7 May 1964 to elect members of Kingston upon Thames London Borough Council in London, England. The whole council was up for election and the Conservative party gained control of the council.

== Background ==
These elections were the first to the newly formed borough. Previously elections had taken place in the Municipal Borough of Kingston-upon-Thames, Municipal Borough of Malden and Coombe and Municipal Borough of Surbiton. These boroughs were joined to form the new London Borough of Kingston upon Thames by the London Government Act 1963.

A total of 172 candidates stood in the election for the 60 seats being contested across 24 wards. These included a full slate from the Conservative and Labour parties, while the Liberals stood 42 candidates. Other candidates included 9 Residents and 1 Communist. There were 16 two-seat wards, 4 four-seat wards and 4 three-seat wards.

This election had aldermen as well as directly elected councillors. The Conservatives got 9 aldermen and Labour 1.

The Council was elected in 1964 as a "shadow authority" but did not start operations until 1 April 1965.

== Election result ==
The results saw the Conservatives gain the new council with a majority of 20 after winning 40 of the 60 seats. Overall turnout in the election was 43.0%. This turnout included 389 postal votes.

== Ward results ==
Berrylands (4)
Party	Candidate	Votes	%	±%
Turnout		2,698	43.8	
	Conservative win (new seat)			
	Conservative win (new seat)			
	Conservative win (new seat)			
	Conservative win (new seat)			

Burlington (2)
Party	Candidate	Votes	%	±%
Turnout		1,934	62.8	
	Labour win (new seat)			
	Labour win (new seat)			

Cambridge (2)
Party	Candidate	Votes	%	±%
Turnout		1,118	36.4	
	Conservative win (new seat)			
	Conservative win (new seat)			

Canbury (3)
Party	Candidate	Votes	%	±%
Turnout		1,812	44.8	
	Labour win (new seat)			
	Labour win (new seat)			
	Labour win (new seat)			

Chessington (4)
Party	Candidate	Votes	%	±%
Turnout		3,487	48.4	
	Labour win (new seat)			
	Labour win (new seat)			
	Labour win (new seat)			
	Labour win (new seat)			

Coombe (2)
Party	Candidate	Votes	%	±%
Turnout		1,883	36.8	
	Conservative win (new seat)			
	Conservative win (new seat)			

Dickerage (2)
Party	Candidate	Votes	%	±%
Turnout		1,045	33.3	
	Labour win (new seat)			
	Labour win (new seat)			

Grove (3)
Party	Candidate	Votes	%	±%
Turnout		1,554	35.7	
	Conservative win (new seat)			
	Conservative win (new seat)			
	Conservative win (new seat)			

Hill (2)
Party	Candidate	Votes	%	±%
Turnout		1,159	35.2	
	Conservative win (new seat)			
	Conservative win (new seat)			

Hook & Southborough (4)
Party	Candidate	Votes	%	±%
Turnout		3,426	47.1	
	Conservative win (new seat)			
	Conservative win (new seat)			
	Conservative win (new seat)			
	Labour win (new seat)			

Malden Green (2)
Party	Candidate	Votes	%	±%
Turnout		1,517	53.5	
	Conservative win (new seat)			
	Conservative win (new seat)			

Malden Manor (2)
Party	Candidate	Votes	%	±%
Turnout		2,141	50.8	
	Conservative win (new seat)			
	Conservative win (new seat)			

Mount (2)
Party	Candidate	Votes	%	±%
Turnout		1,480	42.9	
	Conservative win (new seat)			
	Conservative win (new seat)			

Norbiton (2)
Party	Candidate	Votes	%	±%
Turnout		1,411	37.5	
	Labour win (new seat)			
	Labour win (new seat)			

Norbiton Park (2)
Party	Candidate	Votes	%	±%
Turnout		1,651	44.3	
	Conservative win (new seat)			
	Conservative win (new seat)			

Park (2)
Party	Candidate	Votes	%	±%
Turnout		1,631	44.8	
	Labour win (new seat)			
	Labour win (new seat)			

St James's (2)
Party	Candidate	Votes	%	±%
Turnout		1,630	49.8	
	Conservative win (new seat)			
	Conservative win (new seat)			

St Mark's & Seething Wells (4)
Party	Candidate	Votes	%	±%
Turnout		2,083	31.5	
	Conservative win (new seat)			
	Conservative win (new seat)			
	Conservative win (new seat)			
	Conservative win (new seat)			

Surbiton Hill (3)
Party	Candidate	Votes	%	±%
Turnout		1,471	30.3	
	Conservative win (new seat)			
	Conservative win (new seat)			
	Conservative win (new seat)			

Tolworth East (3)
Party	Candidate	Votes	%	±%
Turnout		2,178	48.1	
	Conservative win (new seat)			
	Conservative win (new seat)			
	Conservative win (new seat)			

Tolworth South (2)
Party	Candidate	Votes	%	±%
Turnout		2,118	48.6	
	Labour win (new seat)			
	Labour win (new seat)			

Tolworth West (2)
Party	Candidate	Votes	%	±%
Turnout		1,717	49.3	
	Labour win (new seat)			
	Labour win (new seat)			

Town (2)
Party	Candidate	Votes	%	±%
Turnout		1,340	38.2	
	Conservative win (new seat)			
	Conservative win (new seat)			

Tudor (2)
Party	Candidate	Votes	%	±%
Turnout		1,796	44.2	
	Conservative win (new seat)			
	Conservative win (new seat)			
