= 1964 London local elections =

- 7 May 1964

All 1,859 on all 32 London boroughs
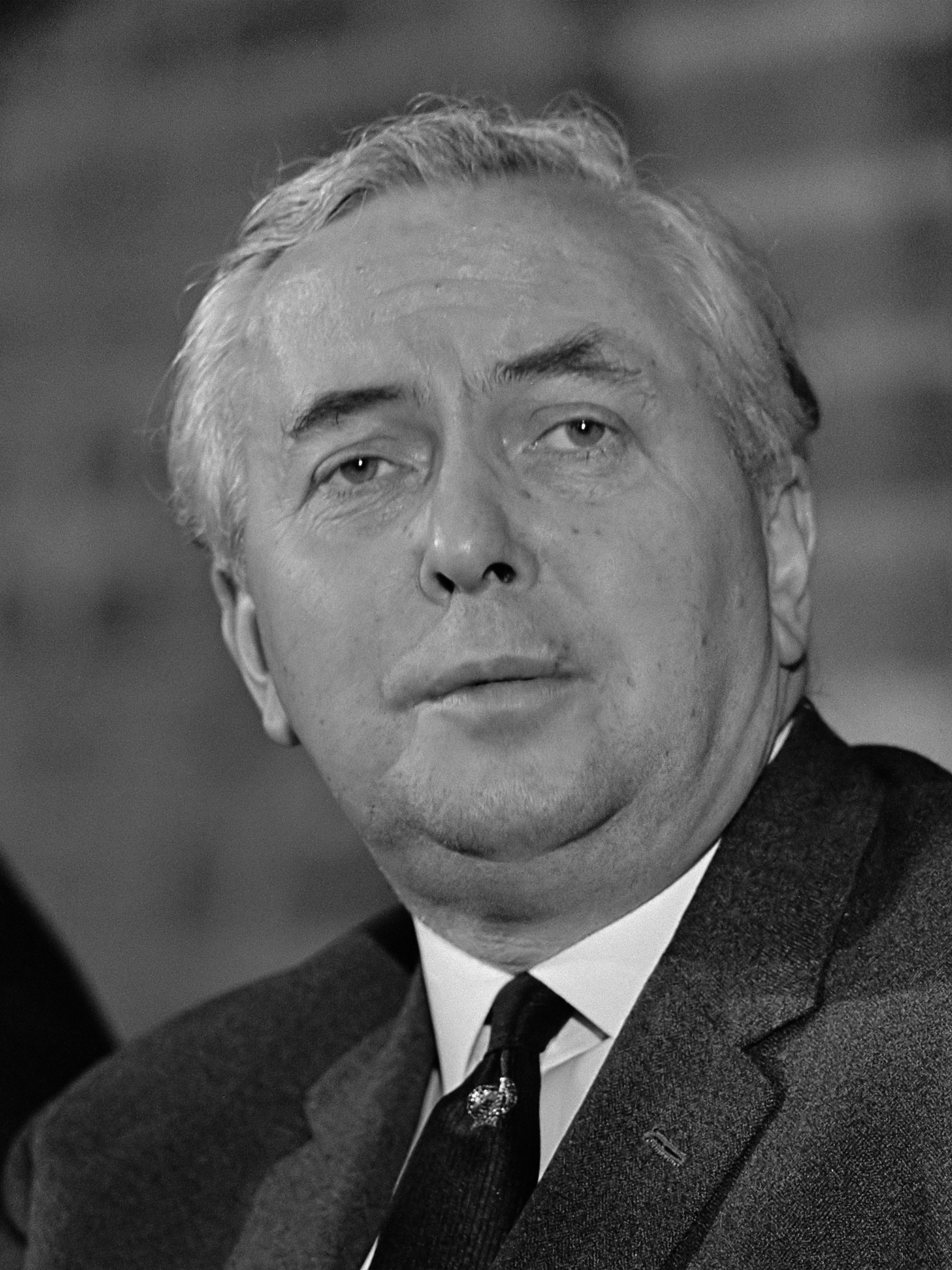

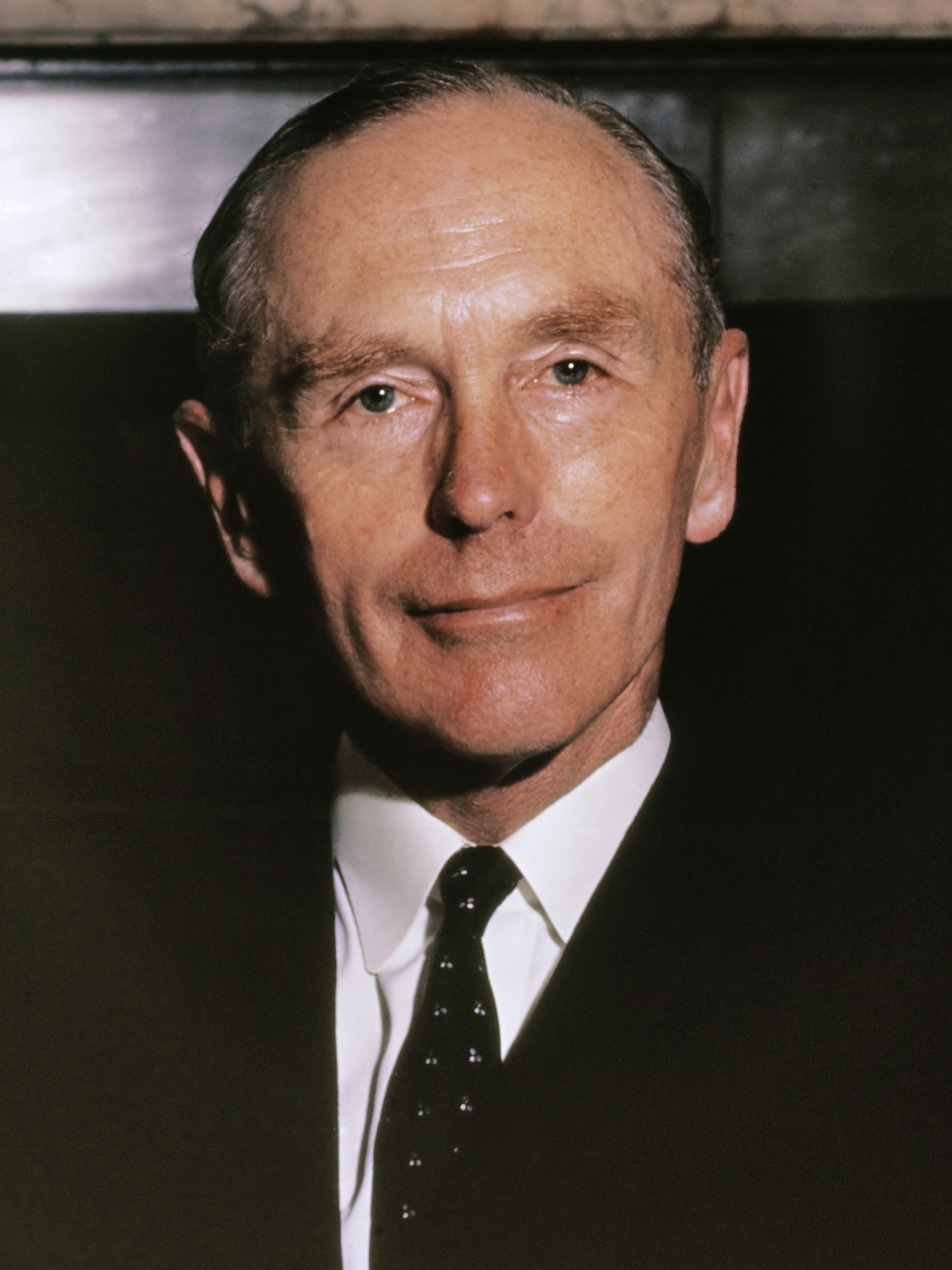
	First party	Second party
Leader	Harold Wilson	Alec Douglas-Home
Party	Labour	Conservative
Councils	20	9
Councillors	1,112	668
- London borough councils by political control following election. Councils that are Labour are in red, Conservative in blue. Black indicates no overall control.

The 1964 London local elections were held on 7 May 1964 alongside nationwide elections. They were the inaugural elections for the thirty-two London boroughs, which were created on 1 April 1965 by the London Government Act 1963. All seats were up for election, with polling stations open between 08:00 and 21:00.

The result was a landslide for the Labour Party, who won twenty of the boroughs. The Conservatives won nine, and three were under no overall control. Only sixteen Liberal councillors were elected in London, along with forty-nine residents and ratepayers candidates, three independents and three Communists. The result followed the convincing Labour gain of the new Greater London Council in the first GLC elections which had been held on 9 April.

== Aldermanic elections ==
Until 1978, each council had aldermen, in the ratio of one aldermen to six councillors. Following the elections, each council elected all of its aldermen, half of which served until 1968 and half until 1971. This did not affect political control in any borough.

== Council results ==
Summary of council election results:

	Political control	Conservative	Labour	Liberal	Residents	Others	Details
Barking	Labour	-	45	-	4	-	Details
Barnet	Conservative	37	13	6	-	-	Details
Bexley	Labour	17	39	-	-	-	Details
Brent	Labour	26	34	-	-	-	Details
Bromley	Conservative	38	15	7	-	-	Details
Camden	Labour	26	34	-	-	-	Details
Croydon	NOC	30	21	-	6	3	Details
Ealing	Labour	26	34	-	-	-	Details
Enfield	Labour	29	31	-	-	-	Details
Greenwich	Labour	11	49	-	-	-	Details
Hackney	Labour	-	60	-	-	-	Details
Hammersmith	Labour	7	53	-	-	-	Details
Haringey	Labour	19	41	-	-	-	Details
Harrow	Conservative	36	20	-	-	-	Details
Havering	NOC	16	27	-	12	-	Details
Hillingdon	Labour	24	36	-	-	-	Details
Hounslow	Labour	12	48	-	-	-	Details
Islington	Labour	-	60	-	-	-	Details
Kensington and Chelsea	Conservative	46	14	-	-	-	Details
Kingston upon Thames	Conservative	40	20	-	-	-	Details
Lambeth	Labour	18	42	-	-	-	Details
Lewisham	Labour	15	45	-	-	-	Details
Merton	NOC	24	26	-	4	-	Details
Newham	Labour	-	50	3	7	-	Details
Redbridge	Conservative	45	15	-	-	-	Details
Richmond upon Thames	Conservative	41	12	-	1	-	Details
Southwark	Labour	6	54	-	-	-	Details
Sutton	Conservative	30	17	-	4	-	Details
Tower Hamlets	Labour	-	55	-	2	3	Details
Waltham Forest	Labour	3	36	-	9	-	Details
Wandsworth	Labour	13	47	-	-	-	Details
Westminster	Conservative	41	19	-	-	-	Details

== Overall councillor numbers ==
Councillor statistics, 1964
Party	Seats	+/-	Councils	+/-
Labour	1,112	+1,112	20	+20
Conservative	668	+668	9	+9
Residents' association	49	+49		
Liberal	16	+16		
Independent	11	+11		
Communist	3	+3		
No overall control			3	+3
