= Bethnal Green West (2014 ward) =

Bethnal Green West St Peter's (2014–2022)
- Electoral ward for the Tower Hamlets London Borough Council
- The ward boundaries since 2014
- Borough: Tower Hamlets
- County: Greater London
- Population: 19,779 (2021)
- Electorate: 13,850 (2022)
- Major settlements: Bethnal Green
- Area: 1.106 square kilometres (0.427 sq mi)

Current electoral ward
- Created: 2014
- Councillors: 3
- Created from: Bethnal Green North, Bethnal Green South
- GSS code: E05009331

Bethnal Green West is an electoral ward in the London Borough of Tower Hamlets. The ward was created as St Peter's in 2014 and was renamed in 2022. It was first used in the 2014 elections. It returns three councillors to Tower Hamlets London Borough Council.

== Tower Hamlets council elections ==
The St Peter's ward was renamed Bethnal Green West in 2022 with no changes to the boundaries.

=== 2022 election ===
The election took place on 5 May 2022.

2022 Tower Hamlets London Borough Council election: Bethnal Green West
Party	Candidate	Votes	%	±%
Aspire	Musthak Ahmed	2,744	44.97	+26.91
Aspire	Abu Chowdhury	2,673	43.81	+27.15
Aspire	Rahman Amin	2,562	41.99	+27.63
Labour	Sufia Alam	2,123	34.79	−8.58
Labour	Kevin Brady	1,881	30.83	−15.63
Labour	Mizan Chaudhury	1,724	28.25	−13.23
Green	Paul Burgess	752	12.32	−1.32
Green	David Cox	745	12.21	+1.03
Liberal Democrats	Rebecca Jones	374	6.13	−0.23
Liberal Democrats	Judith Cohen	341	5.59	+0.38
Conservative	Lucy Hamilton	258	4.23	−0.94
Conservative	Angela Magny	220	3.61	+0.15
Conservative	Bernard Magny	193	3.16	+0.09
TUSC	Sarah O'Neill	191	3.13	N/A
Liberal Democrats	Ashley Lumsden	189	3.10	−1.35
Rejected ballots		48		
Turnout		6,102	44.06	+0.67
Registered electors		13,850		
Aspire gain from Labour		Swing		
Aspire gain from Labour		Swing		
Aspire gain from Labour		Swing		

=== 2018 election ===
The election took place on 3 May 2018.

2018 Tower Hamlets London Borough Council election: St Peter's
Party	Candidate	Votes	%	±%
Labour	Kevin Brady	2,660	46.46	+12.38
Labour	Tarik Khan	2,483	43.37	+12.14
Labour	Gabriela Salva Macallan	2,375	41.48	+13.38
Aspire	Muhammad Mustaquim	1,034	18.06	−16.01
Aspire	Abu Chowdhury	954	16.66	N/A
Aspire	Muhammed Alipir	822	14.36	N/A
PATH	Akram Ahmed	781	13.64	N/A
Green	Alexandra Britten	781	13.64	−4.84
PATH	Azizur Khan	726	12.68	−0.41
PATH	Abjol Miah	705	12.31	−25.04
Green	Ciaran Jebb	640	11.18	−4.65
Green	Bethan Lant	437	7.63	N/A
Liberal Democrats	John Griffiths	364	6.36	−6.73
Liberal Democrats	Tilly Munro	298	5.21	N/A
Conservative	Susan Field	296	5.17	−0.41
Liberal Democrats	Arif Erdogan	255	4.45	N/A
Conservative	Gregory Rodwell	198	3.46	−1.45
Conservative	Zachary Spiro	176	3.07	+1.23
Rejected ballots		42		
Turnout		5,767	43.39	
Registered electors		13,292		
Labour gain from Tower Hamlets First		Swing		
Labour hold		Swing		
Labour gain from Tower Hamlets First		Swing		

=== 2014 election ===
The election took place on 22 May 2014.

2014 Tower Hamlets London Borough Council election: St Peter's
Party	Candidate	Votes	%	±%
Tower Hamlets First	Abjol Miah	2,289	37.35	
Labour	Clare Harrisson	2,089	34.08	
Tower Hamlets First	Muhammed Mustaquim	2,088	34.07	
Tower Hamlets First	Aktaruz Zaman	1,935	31.57	
Labour	Carlo Gibbs	1,914	31.23	
Labour	Sanu Miah	1,722	28.10	
Green	Paul Burgess	1,114	18.18	
Green	David Cox	970	15.83	
Liberal Democrats	Azizur Khan	802	13.09	
UKIP	Bertlyn Springer	453	7.39	
Conservative	Rachel Watts	342	5.58	
Conservative	Simon Fish	301	4.91	
TUSC	Leonard Rowlands	222	3.62	
Conservative	Adrian Thompson	113	1.84	
Turnout		6,183	46.90	
Tower Hamlets First win (new seat)				
Labour win (new seat)				
Tower Hamlets First win (new seat)				
