= 1968 Tower Hamlets London Borough Council election =

1968 local election in England

← 1964	9 May 1968	1971 →

All 60 council seats of the Tower Hamlets London Borough Council 31 seats needed for a majority
Council control before election
Labour
Subsequent council control
Labour

Elections to Tower Hamlets London Borough Council were held on 9 May 1968. The whole council was up for election. Turnout was 14.3%.

Until 1978, each London council had aldermen, in the ratio of one aldermen to six councillors. Tower Hamlets had ten aldermen. Following the elections, Tower Hamlets elected five aldermen, who served until 1974. The remaining five aldermen had been elected in 1964 and would serve until 1971. All aldermen on Tower Hamlets were Labour.

== Election result ==
Tower Hamlets local election result 1968
Party	Seats	Gains	Losses	Net gain/loss	Seats %	Votes %	Votes	+/−
Labour	57	2		+2				
Communist	3							
Conservative	0				0.0			
Liberal	0				0.0			
Independent	0				0.0			
Independent Labour	0				0.0			
Union Movement	0				0.0			

== Ward results ==
=== Bethnal Green Central ===
Bethnal Green Central (3)
Party	Candidate	Votes	%	±%
Labour	J. Docherty	591		
Labour	Mrs. D. M. Couling	576		
Labour	Miss H. Morsman	570		
Conservative	R. D. Mitchell	499		
Conservative	J. R. M. Baker	465		
Conservative	E. Isaacs	452		
Majority				
Turnout		5,799	19.4	
Labour hold		Swing		
Labour hold		Swing		
Labour hold		Swing		

=== Bethnal Green East ===
Bethnal Green East (3)
Party	Candidate	Votes	%	±%
Labour	E. Bishop	Unopposed		
Labour	G. M. Browne	Unopposed		
Labour	Mrs. P. J. Walker	Unopposed		
Majority				
Turnout		6,454	N/A	
Labour hold		Swing		
Labour hold		Swing		
Labour hold		Swing		

=== Bethnal Green North ===
Bethnal Green North (3)
Party	Candidate	Votes	%	±%
Labour	A. Stocks	420		
Labour	Mrs. L. D. Crook	401		
Labour	A. C. Jacob	398		
Liberal	C. A. S. Suett	251		
Liberal	Mrs. L. Law	247		
Liberal	Miss M. E. W. Hewison	237		
Union Movement	F. C. Lang	160		
Majority				
Turnout		5,957	14.1	
Labour hold		Swing		
Labour hold		Swing		
Labour hold		Swing		

=== Bethnal Green South ===
Bethnal Green South (3)
Party	Candidate	Votes	%	±%
Labour	E. G. Walker	503		
Labour	H. Bloom	501		
Labour	Mrs. L. E. Brazier	499		
Independent Labour	W. E. Turner	143		
Communist	D. Cronin	138		
Majority				
Turnout		5,522	12.7	
Labour hold		Swing		
Labour hold		Swing		
Labour hold		Swing		

=== Bethnal Green West ===
Bethnal Green West (3)
Party	Candidate	Votes	%	±%
Labour	A. Friedlander	Unopposed		
Labour	H. A. Moore	Unopposed		
Labour	A. Praag	Unopposed		
Majority				
Turnout		6,175	N/A	
Labour hold		Swing		
Labour hold		Swing		
Labour hold		Swing		

=== Bow North ===
Bow North (2)
Party	Candidate	Votes	%	±%
Labour	T. J. Beningfield	638		
Labour	E. C. Winterflood	599		
Conservative	R. C. Denney	306		
Conservative	R. W. Hartley	271		
Majority				
Turnout		4,087	23.2	
Labour hold		Swing		
Labour hold		Swing		

=== Bow South ===
Bow South (3)
Party	Candidate	Votes	%	±%
Labour	K. A. Dodd	Unopposed		
Labour	W. T. Tuson	Unopposed		
Labour	Miss J. E. Wiggins	Unopposed		
Majority				
Turnout		6,182	N/A	
Labour hold		Swing		
Labour hold		Swing		
Labour hold		Swing		

=== Bromley ===
Bromley (3)
Party	Candidate	Votes	%	±%
Labour	A. W. Downes	845		
Labour	V. E. Johnson	808		
Labour	M. Pollins	767		
Communist	M. Houlihan	173		
Communist	Ms. G. Collier	158		
Majority				
Turnout		6,433	16.3	
Labour hold		Swing		
Labour hold		Swing		
Labour hold		Swing		

=== Holy Trinity ===
Holy Trinity (3)
Party	Candidate	Votes	%	±%
Labour	J. O'Connor	617		
Labour	J. Olley	609		
Labour	G. H. Wall	553		
Communist	D. Lyons	151		
Majority				
Turnout		7,530	10.5	
Labour hold		Swing		
Labour hold		Swing		
Labour hold		Swing		

=== Limehouse ===
Limehouse (4)
Party	Candidate	Votes	%	±%
Labour	J. Milrood	Unopposed		
Labour	A. R. Moffat	Unopposed		
Labour	Mrs. K. O'Connor	Unopposed		
Labour	J. Riley	Unopposed		
Majority				
Turnout		8,200	N/A	
Labour hold		Swing		
Labour hold		Swing		
Labour hold		Swing		
Labour hold		Swing		

=== Poplar East ===
Poplar East (3)
Party	Candidate	Votes	%	±%
Labour	W. T. G. Guy	Unopposed		
Labour	G. W. Negus	Unopposed		
Labour	D. N. Watts	Unopposed		
Majority				
Turnout		7,294	N/A	
Labour hold		Swing		
Labour hold		Swing		
Labour hold		Swing		

=== Poplar Millwall ===
Poplar Millwall (2)
Party	Candidate	Votes	%	±%
Labour	E. T. Johns	Unopposed		
Labour	W. F. Willson	Unopposed		
Majority				
Turnout		5,148	N/A	
Labour hold		Swing		
Labour gain from Residents		Swing		

=== Poplar South ===
Poplar South (2)
Party	Candidate	Votes	%	±%
Labour	Daniel Kelly	Unopposed		
Labour	J. T. Tucker	Unopposed		
Majority				
Turnout		5,035	N/A	
Labour hold		Swing		
Labour hold		Swing		

=== Poplar West ===
Poplar West (3)
Party	Candidate	Votes	%	±%
Labour	F. W. Briden	Unopposed		
Labour	G. T. Desmond	Unopposed		
Labour	H. Kerens	Unopposed		
Majority				
Turnout		6,612	N/A	
Labour hold		Swing		
Labour hold		Swing		
Labour hold		Swing		

=== Redcoat ===
Redcoat (3)
Party	Candidate	Votes	%	±%
Labour	M. J. Durell	578		
Labour	G. R. Chaney	576		
Labour	R. Cockel	559		
Liberal	G. F. Stewart	336		
Liberal	J. A. Rudd	334		
Liberal	T. R. Bond	327		
Communist	J. B. Dash	220		
Majority				
Turnout		6,843	16.5	
Labour hold		Swing		
Labour hold		Swing		
Labour hold		Swing		

=== St Dunstan's ===
St Dunstan's (3)
Party	Candidate	Votes	%	±%
Labour	E. W. Hill	504		
Labour	Mrs. I. B. Calnan	484		
Labour	B. Holmes	481		
Communist	F. Whipple	135		
Majority				
Turnout		6,208	10.7	
Labour hold		Swing		
Labour hold		Swing		
Labour hold		Swing		

=== St Katherine's ===
St Katharine's (4)
Party	Candidate	Votes	%	±%
Labour	Mrs. E. Armsby	540		
Labour	J. M. Desmond	530		
Labour	W. Leary	517		
Labour	Mrs. R. E. Perkins	451		
Communist	B. Marten	167		
Majority				
Turnout		7,552	9.3	
Labour hold		Swing		
Labour hold		Swing		
Labour hold		Swing		
Labour hold		Swing		

=== St Mary's ===
St Mary's (3)
Party	Candidate	Votes	%	±%
Communist	Solly Kaye	635		
Communist	B. Borman	624		
Communist	Max Levitas	549		
Labour	H. Conway	481		
Labour	R. W. Ashkettle	428		
Labour	S. Marchant	428		
Majority				
Turnout		6,027	19.1	
Communist hold		Swing		
Communist hold		Swing		
Communist hold		Swing		

=== Shadwell ===
Shadwell (3)
Party	Candidate	Votes	%	±%
Labour	F. G. Spearing	540		
Labour	J. C. Lawder	504		
Labour	C. W. Mudd	503		
Communist	K. Halpin	176		
Independent	W. J. C. Gardener	136		
Majority				
Turnout		7,019	11.3	
Labour hold		Swing		
Labour hold		Swing		
Labour hold		Swing		

=== Spitalfields ===
Spitalfields (4)
Party	Candidate	Votes	%	±%
Labour	W. Harris	640		
Labour	Mrs. A. Elboz	634		
Labour	J. Reardon	605		
Labour	W. C. Simson	600		
Conservative	W. H. Dove	273		
Conservative	D. H. P. Bridgehouse	239		
Conservative	R. M. Fysh	223		
Communist	G. Anthony	192		
Majority				
Turnout		7,846	14.3	
Labour hold		Swing		
Labour hold		Swing		
Labour hold		Swing		
Labour hold		Swing		
