= 1978 Tower Hamlets London Borough Council election =

1978 local election in England

- 4 May 1978

50 of 50 seats to Tower Hamlets London Borough Council 26 seats needed for a majority
	First party	Second party
Leader	Paul Beasley	Eric Flounders
Party	Labour	Liberal
Leader's seat	East India	Grove
Seats before	60	0
Seats won	43	7
Seat change	▼7	▲7
Popular vote	45,613	7,635
Percentage	64.5%	10.8%
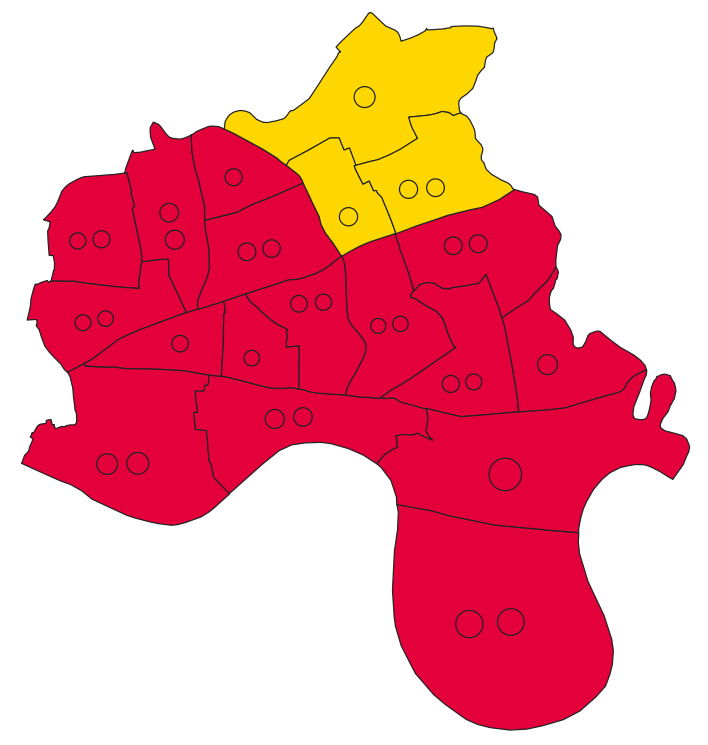
- Map of results of the 1978 election
Leader of the Council before election
Paul Beasley
Labour
Leader of the Council after election
Paul Beasley
Labour

Elections to Tower Hamlets London Borough Council were held on Thursday 4 May 1978. Ward boundary changes came into effect at this election, which reduced the number of councillors from 60 to 50. The whole council was up for election.

The Labour Party retained overall control of the council.

== Election result ==
Party	Votes		Seats		
Labour Party	45,613 (64.5%)		43 (86.0%)	43 / 50	▼17
Liberal Party	7,635 (10.8%)		7 (14.0%)	7 / 50	▲7
National Front	7,057 (10.0%)	N/A	0 (0.0%)	0 / 50	N/A
Conservative Party	6,761 (9.6%)		0 (0.0%)	0 / 50	Steady
Residents	1,446 (2.0%)	N/A	0 (0.0%)	0 / 50	Steady
Communist	950 (1.3%)		0 (0.0%)	0 / 50	Steady
Socialist Unity	695 (1.0%)	N/A	0 (0.0%)	0 / 50	N/A
Socialist Workers Party	325 (0.5%)	N/A	0 (0.0%)	0 / 50	N/A
Independent Liberal	98 (0.1%)	N/A	0 (0.0%)	0 / 99	N/A
Workers Revolutionary	98 (0.1%)	N/A	0 (0.0%)	0 / 50	N/A

↓
43	7

== Ward results ==
=== Blackwall ===
Blackwall (2)
Party	Candidate	Votes	%	±%
Labour	Daniel Kelly	742	71.8	
Labour	Arthur Sanders	663	64.1	
Conservative	Lindsey Rowley	151	14.6	
Conservative	Selwyn Williams	132	12.8	
National Front	George Davis	108	10.4	
National Front	Beverley Matthews	97	9.4	
Majority		512	49.5	
Turnout		1,034	20.9	
Labour win (new seat)				
Labour win (new seat)				

=== Bow ===
Bow (3)
Party	Candidate	Votes	%	±%
Liberal	Peter Gray	656	42.6	
Liberal	Ronald Lebar	635	41.3	
Liberal	Gwendoline Lee	632	41.1	
Labour	Thomas Crudgington	560	36.4	
Labour	Hetty Hawksbee	553	34.8	
Labour	Deirdre Wood	525	34.1	
Conservative	John Livingstone	129	8.4	
Conservative	Linda Archibald	111	7.2	
Conservative	Tania Mason	108	7.0	
National Front	Richard Cribb	99	6.4	
National Front	Albert Buttery	98	6.4	
National Front	Ernest Bale	88	5.7	
Majority		72	4.7	
Turnout		1,539	33.7	
Liberal win (new seat)				
Liberal win (new seat)				
Liberal win (new seat)				

=== Bromley ===
Bromley (3)
Party	Candidate	Votes	%	±%
Labour	William Guy	1,129		
Labour	Arthur Downes	1,119		
Labour	James Morris	1,055		
Conservative	Malcolm Goldberg	275		
Conservative	Doris Young	229		
National Front	Kevin Jones	177		
National Front	Stanley Muzzlewhite	149		
National Front	Tina Rowe	141		
Majority				
Turnout		6,166	27.3	

=== East India ===
East India (2)
Party	Candidate	Votes	%	±%
Labour	Paul Beasley	1,032		
Labour	Patricia Thompson	989		
National Front	Iris Berry	191		
Conservative	Raymond Hatter	185		
National Front	Raymond Underwood	152		
Majority				
Turnout		5,012	30.1	

=== Grove ===
Grove (2)
Party	Candidate	Votes	%	±%
Liberal	Eric Flounders	933		
Liberal	Irene Seabrook	850		
Labour	James Brooke	584		
Labour	Albert Snooks	554		
Conservative	Caroline Evans	141		
National Front	Edwin Smith	90		
National Front	James Buttery	89		
Majority				
Turnout		4,451	39.5	

=== Holy Trinity ===
Holy Trinity (3)
Party	Candidate	Votes	%	±%
Labour	Joseph O'Connor	1,051		
Labour	George Negus	1,036		
Labour	George Wall	974		
Conservative	Barbara Perrott	351		
Conservative	William McCrossan	336		
National Front	Irene Underwood	254		
National Front	Michael Rowe	230		
National Front	George Williams	207		
Majority				
Turnout		6,819	25.8	

=== Lansbury ===
Lansbury (3)
Party	Candidate	Votes	%	±%
Labour	George Desmond	1,120		
Labour	Alfred Hegarty	1,080		
Labour	Reginald Beer	1,078		
Conservative	Herbert Cook	283		
Conservative	Edith Goymer	260		
National Front	Stephen Colville	225		
National Front	Margaret Rowe	199		
Majority				
Turnout		6,295	27.4	

=== Limehouse ===
Limehouse (3)
Party	Candidate	Votes	%	±%
Labour	John Riley	1,101		
Labour	John O'Neill	1,093		
Labour	Dennis Twomey	1,003		
Conservative	Terence Poole	285		
National Front	Victor Clark	221		
National Front	John Tear	200		
National Front	Terence Rowe	191		
Communist	Anita Halpin	93		
Majority				
Turnout		7,147	24.0	

=== Millwall ===
Millwall (3)
Party	Candidate	Votes	%	±%
Labour	John Allen	1,116		
Labour	William Kilgour	979		
Labour	William Hickin	963		
Conservative	Kenneth Hollands	297		
National Front	Kevin Griffin	236		
National Front	Peter Edwards	224		
National Front	Donald Williams	170		
Turnout		7,144	24.4	

=== Park ===
Park (2)
Party	Candidate	Votes	%	±%
Liberal	Brian Williams	1,174		
Liberal	Brenda Collins	1,117		
Labour	Thomas Beningfield	399		
Labour	Edmund Winterflood	357		
National Front	Thomas Matthews	128		
National Front	Rosina Muzzlewhite	122		
Majority				
Turnout		4,638	38.6	

=== Redcoat ===
Redcoat (2)
Party	Candidate	Votes	%	±%
Labour	Matthew Durrell	958		
Labour	George Chaney	950		
Conservative	Mary Firmin	315		
National Front	Terence Godden	144		
National Front	Mary Matthews	125		
Communist	Daniel Lyons	72		
Majority				
Turnout		5,338	28.6	

=== St Dunstan's ===
St Dunstan's (3)
Party	Candidate	Votes	%	±%
Labour	Arthur Dorrell	1,087		
Labour	Benjamin Holmes	1,060		
Labour	Emmanuel Penner	980		
Conservative	Janet Beater	360		
National Front	Robert Bargery	200		
National Front	Sylvia Bale	163		
Communist	Frank Whipple	117		
Workers Revolutionary	Bridget Leach	98		
Majority				
Turnout		6,698	27.0	

=== St James' ===
St James' (2)
Party	Candidate	Votes	%	±%
Labour	George Browne	691		
Labour	Hannah Morsman	660		
Conservative	Ernest Hartley	301		
Conservative	Elizabeth Hartley	295		
National Front	Peter Beresford	233		
National Front	Frederick Nail	228		
Majority				
Turnout		4,922	26.6	

=== St Katharine's ===
St Katharine's (3)
Party	Candidate	Votes	%	±%
Labour	Robert McFarlane	1,001		
Labour	Gerald Simons	955		
Labour	Rachel Perkins	952		
Residents	Maureen Davies	307		
Residents	Michael Jempson	287		
Conservative	John Ranelagh	243		
Communist	Kevin Halpin	142		
National Front	John Muzzlewhite	108		
Independent Liberal	Peter Lear	98		
Majority				
Turnout		6,166	27.8	

=== St Mary's ===
St Mary's (2)
Party	Candidate	Votes	%	±%
Labour	Robert Ashkettle	1,083		
Labour	Barnett Saunders	1,027		
Conservative	Brenda Epstein	378		
Communist	Max Levitas	313		
Conservative	Edna Hill	251		
National Front	John Gibbons	56		
National Front	Terence Jellis	52		
Majority				
Turnout		5,351	31.7	

=== St Peter's ===
St Peter's (3)
Party	Candidate	Votes	%	±%
Labour	Albert Jacob	1,109		
Labour	Beatrice Orwell	1,063		
Labour	Edwin Walker	1,050		
Conservative	Patrick Holmes	431		
National Front	Albert Mariner	401		
National Front	George Newman	376		
Communist	Hugh McAlpine	121		
Majority				
Turnout		7,809	25.3	

=== Shadwell ===
Shadwell (3)
Party	Candidate	Votes	%	±%
Labour	Charles Mudd	1,101		
Labour	Eva Armsby	1,094		
Labour	Jeremiah Long	1,038		
Residents	John Quarrell	287		
Conservative	Anthony Spiterie	266		
Conservative	Alan Minnerthey	254		
National Front	Thomas Underwood	155		
Residents	Christopher Idle	149		
Residents	John Chesshyre	146		
Communist	Albert Common	92		
Majority				
Turnout		6,059	30.9	

=== Spitalfields ===
Spitalfields (3)
Party	Candidate	Votes	%	±%
Labour	William Harris	950		
Labour	Annie Elboz	941		
Labour	Geoffrey White	835		
Socialist Unity	Hilda Kean	377		
Socialist Workers	Colin Knowles	325		
Socialist Unity	Dave Lawrence	318		
Conservative	William Dove	163		
Residents	John Fresco	145		
Residents	Phyllis Barber	125		
National Front	Albert Bennett	87		
Majority				
Turnout		6,273	28.5	

=== Weavers ===
Weavers (3)
Party	Candidate	Votes	%	±%
Labour	Lillian Crook	748		
Labour	Charles Main	735		
Labour	Arthur Praag	690		
Liberal	Paul Robbins	573		
Liberal	Carol McLeod	555		
Liberal	Henry Stallman	510		
Conservative	Jonathan Fairhurst	231		
National Front	Roy Newman	216		
National Front	Terence Courtney	214		
National Front	Brian Gilbert	213		
Majority				
Turnout		6,609	28.5	
