= Solly Kaye =

British communist politician (1913-2005)

Solomon Kaye (8 October 1913 – 1 May 2005), known as Solly Kaye, was a British communist activist and politician.

Kaye was born in the St Pancras area of London to Jewish parents from Lithuania. His father died in the Spanish Flu epidemic when Solly was five years old, and his mother brought up four children with support from Jewish charities. He left school at age 14 to work as a woodcarver, but lost his job as business was slow. He managed instead to find work for a furrier, although working conditions were very poor. He took art lessons at the Bethnal Green Men's Institute, and had four of his paintings exhibited in Foyle's Gallery.

In 1934, Kaye joined the Communist Party of Great Britain (CPGB), initially through the National Unemployed Workers' Movement; he was present at the Battle of Cable Street, and gave speeches opposing the British Union of Fascists.

Kaye was soon appointed as CPGB branch secretary for Hackney and, as a result, he decided not to volunteer for the International Brigades in the Spanish Civil War. He married Margaret Johnson in 1945, having walked her home for five successive nights, and proposed to her on a park bench on the fifth. They had three children and remained married until his death.

Kaye stood for election in Stepney in the 1955 general election and again in 1959, 1964, 1966 and 1970, taking an average of 6-8% percent of the vote. He also ran as the CPGB candidate for London County Council, and for the Greater London Council division of Tower Hamlets in 1964 and 1967, earning the Party's best vote share in the city on each occasion, peaking at 10.7% in 1967. Kaye enjoyed electoral success in 1956 when he won a seat as Communist member of the Stepney Borough Council (replaced in 1965 by the Tower Hamlets Council). He held the seat for fifteen years.

Kaye became involved in protests against slum landlords. Although at first he encountered resistance from local church officials, he gradually won them over. The Franciscan Neville Palmer declared in the late 1950s that "it is not a sin to vote for Solly Kaye". Father John Groser claimed that "Solly Kaye is the one remaining prophet of the Lord amid all the prophets of Baal on Stepney Council". In 1963, Kaye disguised himself as a City tycoon to attend the auction of Eileen Mansions, a tenement in Whitechapel. Once inside, he threatened that anyone who bought the property would face trouble from him and the tenants, and the property did not sell. This maneuver impressed anti-communist priest Joe Williamson, who thereafter recommended that his parishioners should vote for Kaye.

Alongside his council post, Kaye worked as a copywriter. He was a regular speaker at open air meetings in Finsbury Square, addressing city office employees during their lunch break. He was later employed as a woodwork teacher at Acland Burghley School.

In the mid-1970s, Kaye came to believe that reform of the CPGB was needed, although he opposed the Party's dissolution in 1991. At public events in the late 1980s, he lectured on the anti-fascist movement during the Great Depression as a historical model for countering the rise of the British National Party. Solly Kaye died on 1 May 2005. He was 91.
