= 1974 London local elections =

- 2 May 1974

All 1,867 on all 32 London boroughs
- Turnout: 36.3% (▼2.4%)
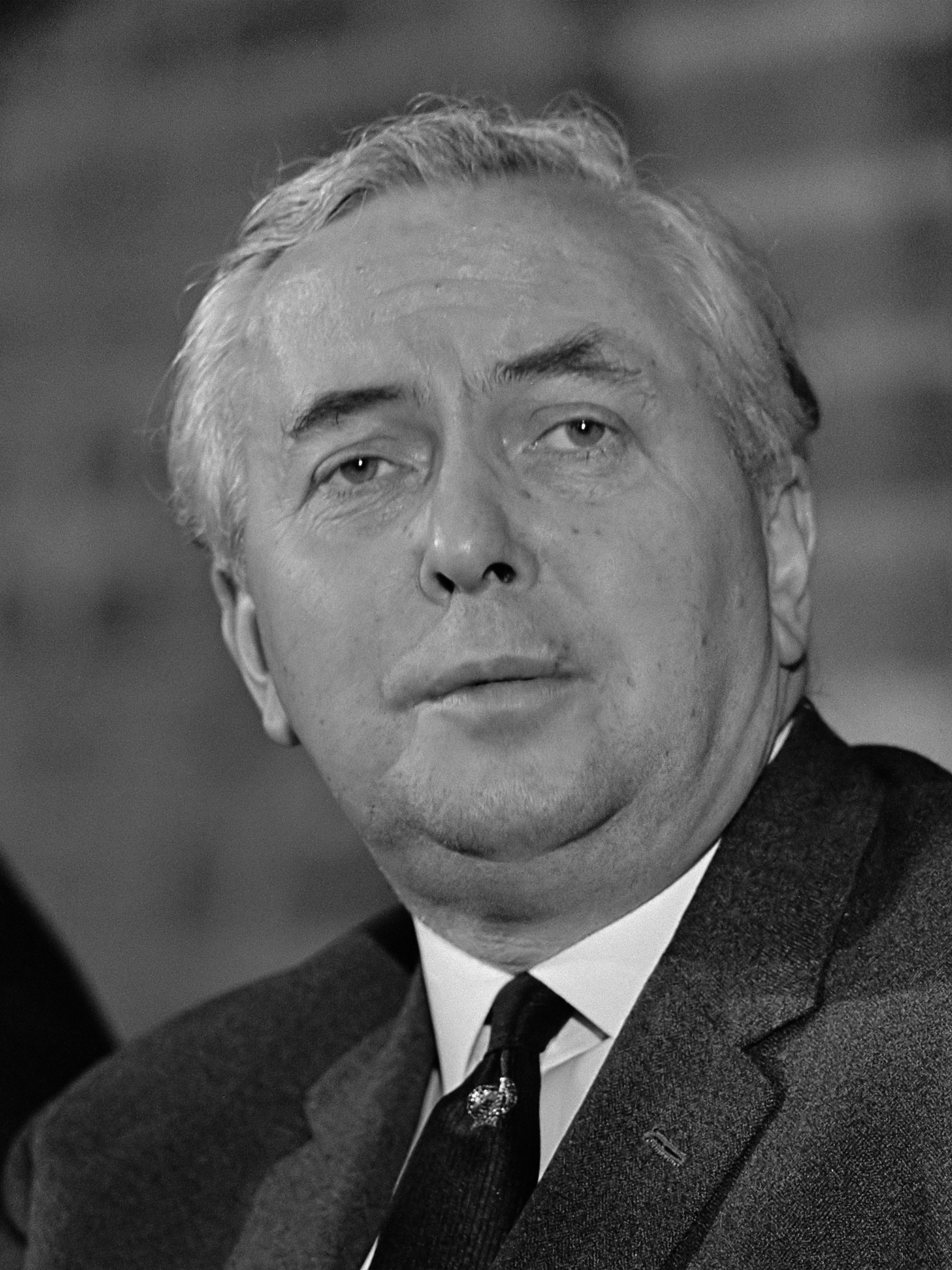

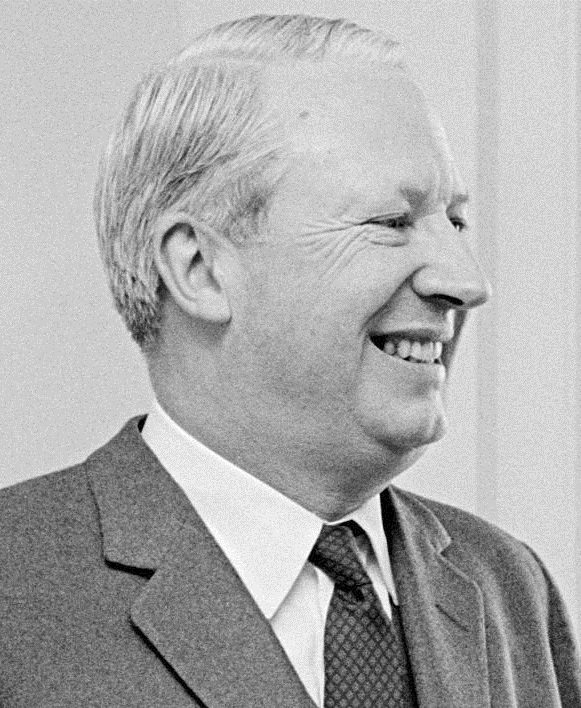
	First party	Second party	Third party
Leader	Harold Wilson	Edward Heath	Jeremy Thorpe
Party	Labour	Conservative	Liberal
Leader since	14 February 1963	27 July 1965	18 January 1967
Popular vote	782,591	761,403	244,725
Percentage	41.9%	40.8%	13.1%
Councils	18	13	0
Councils +/–	▼3	▲3	Steady
Councillors	1,090	713	27
Councillors +/–	▼131	▲116	▲18
- Results by Borough in 1974. (Red indicates Labour, blue indicates the Conservatives and grey indicates No Overall Control)

Local government elections took place in London, and some other parts of the United Kingdom on Thursday 2 May 1974. Ward changes took place which increased the total number of councillors by 4 from 1,863 to 1,867.

All London borough council seats were up for election. The previous Borough elections in London were in 1971.

== Results summary ==
Labour won a narrow victory in terms of votes, winning 41.9% to the Conservatives' 40.8%, but won a decisive victory in seats, winning 1,090 to the Conservatives' 713.

Party	Votes won	% votes	Change	Seats	% seats	Change	Councils	Change
Labour	782,591	41.9		1,090	58.4	-131	18	-3
Conservative	761,403	40.8		713	38.2	+116	13	+3
Liberal	244,725	13.1		27	1.4	+18	0	±0
Others	78,479	4.0		37	2.0	+1	0	±0
No overall control	n/a	n/a		n/a	n/a	n/a	1	±0

== Council results ==
Council	Previous control	Result	Details
Barking	Labour	Labour	Details
Barnet	Conservative	Conservative	Details
Bexley	Labour	Conservative	Details
Brent	Labour	Labour	Details
Bromley	Conservative	Conservative	Details
Camden	Labour	Labour	Details
Croydon	Conservative	Conservative	Details
Ealing	Labour	Labour	Details
Enfield	Conservative	Conservative	Details
Greenwich	Labour	Labour	Details
Hackney	Labour	Labour	Details
Hammersmith	Labour	Labour	Details
Haringey	Labour	Labour	Details
Harrow	No overall control	Conservative	Details
Havering	Labour	No overall control	Details
Hillingdon	Labour	Labour	Details
Hounslow	Labour	Labour	Details
Islington	Labour	Labour	Details
Kensington and Chelsea	Conservative	Conservative	Details
Kingston upon Thames	Conservative	Conservative	Details
Lambeth	Labour	Labour	Details
Lewisham	Labour	Labour	Details
Merton	Labour	Conservative	Details
Newham	Labour	Labour	Details
Redbridge	Conservative	Conservative	Details
Richmond upon Thames	Conservative	Conservative	Details
Southwark	Labour	Labour	Details
Sutton	Conservative	Conservative	Details
Tower Hamlets	Labour	Labour	Details
Waltham Forest	Labour	Labour	Details
Wandsworth	Labour	Labour	Details
Westminster	Conservative	Conservative	Details

== Overall councillor numbers ==
London local elections 1974 Councillor statistics
Party	Seats	Gain/loss
Labour	1,090	-131
Conservative	713	+116
Liberal	27	+18
Others	37	+1
