= 1974 Tower Hamlets London Borough Council election =

1974 local election in England

← 1971	2 May 1974	1978 →

All 60 council seats of the Tower Hamlets London Borough Council 31 seats needed for a majority
Council control before election
Labour
Subsequent council control
Labour

Elections to Tower Hamlets London Borough Council were held on 2 May 1974. The whole council was up for election. Turnout was 18.3%.

== Election result ==
Tower Hamlets local election result 1974
Party	Seats	Gains	Losses	Net gain/loss	Seats %	Votes %	Votes	+/−
Labour	60				100.0	85.8		
Liberal	0				0.0	6.5		
Conservative	0				0.0	2.5		

== Ward results ==
=== Bethnal Green Central ===
Bethnal Green Central (3)
Party	Candidate	Votes	%	±%
Labour	H.T.E. Brazier	600		
Labour	Miss H. Morsman	588		
Labour	T.J. Crudgington	570		
Conservative	Mrs. E. Hartley	135		
Conservative	E.W. Hartley	115		
Majority				
Turnout		5,379	14.7	
Labour hold		Swing		
Labour hold		Swing		
Labour hold		Swing		

=== Bethnal Green East ===
Bethnal Green East (3)
Party	Candidate	Votes	%	±%
Labour	E. Bishop	601		
Labour	Mrs. L.E. Brazier	593		
Labour	G.M. Browne	593		
Liberal	D.B. Williams	312		
Liberal	Miss S.E. Jayes	311		
Majority				
Turnout		5,587	17.9	
Labour hold		Swing		
Labour hold		Swing		
Labour hold		Swing		

=== Bethnal Green North ===
Bethnal Green North (3)
Party	Candidate	Votes	%	±%
Labour	Mrs. L.D. Crook	797		
Labour	A.J. Snooks	784		
Labour	A. Stocks	769		
Liberal	B.C. Duffey	202		
Liberal	C.A.S. Suett	185		
Liberal	Mrs. J. Suett	170		
Majority				
Turnout		5,003	20.5	
Labour hold		Swing		
Labour hold		Swing		
Labour hold		Swing		

=== Bethnal Green South ===
Bethnal Green South (3)
Party	Candidate	Votes	%	±%
Labour	Mrs. B. Orwell	595		
Labour	Miss R.J. Maher	594		
Labour	E.G. Walker	591		
Independent	Mrs. E.S. Hutchings	375		
Independent	Mrs. E.A. Colin	334		
Majority				
Turnout		4,625	22.5	
Labour hold		Swing		
Labour hold		Swing		
Labour hold		Swing		

=== Bethnal Green West ===
Bethnal Green West (3)
Party	Candidate	Votes	%	±%
Labour	C.H. Main	Unopposed		
Labour	H.A. Moore	Unopposed		
Labour	A.M. Praag	Unopposed		
Majority				
Turnout		4,790		
Labour hold		Swing		
Labour hold		Swing		
Labour hold		Swing		

=== Bow North ===
Bow North (2)
Party	Candidate	Votes	%	±%
Labour	T.J. Beningfield	Unopposed		
Labour	E.C. Winterflood	Unopposed		
Majority				
Turnout		4,085		
Labour hold		Swing		
Labour hold		Swing		

=== Bow South ===
Bow South (3)
Party	Candidate	Votes	%	±%
Labour	Mrs. H.G. Hawksbee	Unopposed		
Labour	W.T. Tuson	Unopposed		
Labour	W.H. Woodley	Unopposed		
Majority				
Turnout		4,687		
Labour hold		Swing		
Labour hold		Swing		
Labour hold		Swing		

=== Bromley ===
Bromley (3)
Party	Candidate	Votes	%	±%
Labour	T.W. Harvey	983		
Labour	A.W. Downes	905		
Labour	M. Pollins	905		
Conservative	Miss C.E. Evans	195		
Conservative	Mrs. B.A.S. Hill	160		
Conservative	Mrs. F.M. Roberts	154		
Majority				
Turnout		5,893	21.5	
Labour hold		Swing		
Labour hold		Swing		
Labour hold		Swing		

=== Holy Trinity ===
Holy Trinity (3)
Party	Candidate	Votes	%	±%
Labour	J. O'Connor	887		
Labour	G.W. Negus	854		
Labour	G.H. Wall	828		
Liberal	E. Flounders	427		
Liberal	J.A. Maitland	410		
Majority				
Turnout		6,845	20.2	
Labour hold		Swing		
Labour hold		Swing		
Labour hold		Swing		

=== Limehouse ===
Limehouse (4)
Party	Candidate	Votes	%	±%
Labour	H.F. Rackley	825		
Labour	J. Milrood	819		
Labour	J. Riley	813		
Labour	A.R. Moffat	810		
Communist	Mrs. M.L.B. Campbell	141		
Majority				
Turnout		6,982	14.9	
Labour hold		Swing		
Labour hold		Swing		
Labour hold		Swing		
Labour hold		Swing		

=== Poplar East ===
Poplar East (3)
Party	Candidate	Votes	%	±%
Labour	P. Beasley	Unopposed		
Labour	Miss R.J. Deeming	Unopposed		
Labour	Mrs. P.M. Thompson	Unopposed		
Majority				
Turnout		5,052		
Labour hold		Swing		
Labour hold		Swing		
Labour hold		Swing		

=== Poplar Millwall ===
Poplar Millwall (2)
Party	Candidate	Votes	%	±%
Labour	J.D. Allen	Unopposed		
Labour	W.C. Kilgour	Unopposed		
Majority				
Turnout		7,582		
Labour hold		Swing		
Labour hold		Swing		

=== Poplar South ===
Poplar South (2)
Party	Candidate	Votes	%	±%
Labour	D. Kelly	639		
Labour	J.T. Tucker	564		
Communist	D. Lyons	62		
Majority				
Turnout		4,742	16.0	
Labour hold		Swing		
Labour hold		Swing		

=== Poplar West ===
Poplar West (3)
Party	Candidate	Votes	%	±%
Labour	G.T. Desmond	922		
Labour	R. Beer	874		
Labour	A.P. Hegarty	874		
Communist	Miss R.M.G. Martin	94		
Majority				
Turnout		5,842	18.1	
Labour hold		Swing		
Labour hold		Swing		
Labour hold		Swing		

=== Redcoat ===
Redcoat (3)
Party	Candidate	Votes	%	±%
Labour	G.R. Chaney	877		
Labour	M.J. Durrell	870		
Labour	W. Leary	793		
Communist	J.B. Dash	330		
Majority				
Turnout		6,038	19.7	
Labour hold		Swing		
Labour hold		Swing		
Labour hold		Swing		

=== St Dunstan's ===
St Dunstan's (3)
Party	Candidate	Votes	%	±%
Labour	E.W. Hill	833		
Labour	B. Holmes	787		
Labour	E.D. Penner	737		
Communist	D.M. Bain	127		
Majority				
Turnout		6,117	16.5	
Labour hold		Swing		
Labour hold		Swing		
Labour hold		Swing		

=== St Katherine's ===
St Katherine's (4)
Party	Candidate	Votes	%	±%
Labour	G. Simons	736		
Labour	V.J. Birks	722		
Labour	T. White	703		
Labour	J.R. Ramanoop	665		
Communist	Miss C. Bland	196		
Majority				
Turnout		6,460	15.3	
Labour hold		Swing		
Labour hold		Swing		
Labour hold		Swing		
Labour hold		Swing		

=== St Mary's ===
St Mary's (3)
Party	Candidate	Votes	%	±%
Labour	H. Conway	729		
Labour	B. Saunders	697		
Labour	R.J. Warner	657		
Communist	Max Levitas	280		
Conservative	Mrs. M. Gilmore-Ellis	133		
Conservative	Mrs. L.A. Sumont	129		
Majority				
Turnout		5,239	19.9	
Labour hold		Swing		
Labour hold		Swing		
Labour hold		Swing		

=== Shadwell ===
Shadwell (3)
Party	Candidate	Votes	%	±%
Labour	Mrs. E. Armsby	916		
Labour	J.J.A. Long	824		
Labour	C.W. Mudd	809		
Communist	K. Halpin	211		
Majority				
Turnout		6,172	19.3	
Labour hold		Swing		
Labour hold		Swing		
Labour hold		Swing		

=== Spitalfields ===
Spitalfields (4)
Party	Candidate	Votes	%	±%
Labour	W. Harris	850		
Labour	Mrs. A. Elboz	826		
Labour	I.H. Kuczynski	749		
Labour	J. Reardon	679		
Liberal	W. Kelly	295		
Liberal	H.T. O'Neill	212		
Liberal	D.A. Nicholson	200		
Majority				
Turnout		6,619	18.1	
Labour hold		Swing		
Labour hold		Swing		
Labour hold		Swing		
Labour hold		Swing		
