= Thamesmead East (ward) =

Electoral ward in Bexley, London, England

- Electoral ward for the Bexley London Borough Council
- Thamesmead East ward boundaries since 2018
- Borough: Bexley
- County: Greater London
- Population: 15,926 (2021)
- Electorate: 10,385 (2026)
- Major settlements: Thamesmead
- Area: 3,714 square kilometres (1,434 sq mi)

Current electoral ward
- Created: 1974
- Number of members: 3
- Councillors: Larry Ferguson; Zainab Asunramu; Abi Johnson
- Created from: Belvedere
- ONS code: 00ADGX (2002–2018)
- GSS code: E05000084 (2002–2018); E05011232 (2018–present)

Thamesmead East is an electoral ward in the London Borough of Bexley. The ward was created in 1974 and was split off from the existing ward of Belvedere. It was first used in the 1974 elections. It elects three councillors to Bexley London Borough Council.

== List of councillors ==
Seat	Councillor	Took office	Left office	Party	Election
1	James Dawson	1974	1990	Labour	1974 ... 1986
2	Alastair Matheson	1974	1982	Labour	1974, 1978
3	L. Smith	1974	1975	Labour	1974
3	Anthony West	1975	1986	Labour	1975, 1978, 1982
2	Frank Hammond	1982	1986	Labour	1982
2	Donna Briant	1986	2006	Labour	1986 ... 2002
3	Jennifer Wall	1986	1990	Labour	1986
1	Frank Barratt	1990	1995	Labour	1990, 1994
3	Ronald Brierly	1990	1998	Labour	1990, 1994
1	Christopher Ball	1995	2002	Labour	1995, 1998
3	Michael French	1998	2006	Labour	1998, 2002
1	Harbans Buttar	2002	2010	Labour	2002, 2006
2	Sandra Bauer	2006	2014	Labour	2006, 2010
3	Harry Persaud	2006	2014	Labour	2006, 2010
1	Munir Malik	2010	2014	Labour	2010
1	Derry Begho	2014	2018	Labour	2014
2	Mabel Ogundayo	2014	2026	Labour	2014, 2018, 2022
3	Endy Ezenwata	2014	2018	Labour	2014
1	Esther Amaning	2018	2022	Labour	2018, 2022
3	Danny Hackett (Note: Danny Hackett changed parties in 2019.)	2018	2022	Labour	2018
1	Larry Ferguson	2022	Incumbent	Labour	2022, 2026
3	Zainab Asunramu	2022	Incumbent	Labour	2022, 2026
2	Abi Johnson	2026	Incumbent	Labour	2026

== Bexley council elections since 2018 ==
There was a revision of ward boundaries in Bexley in 2022.

=== 2026 election ===
The election took place on 7 May 2026.

2026 Bexley London Borough Council election: Thamesmead East
Party	Candidate	Votes	%	±%
Labour	Zainab Asunramu	1,460	53.1	▼21.5
Labour	Larry Ferguson	1,361	49.5	
Labour	Abi Johnson	1,346	48.9	
Green	Jonathan Rooks	745	27.1	New
Reform	Lee Delaney	700	25.4	New
Reform	Matthew Solo	658	23.9	
Reform	Tom Staples	643	23.4	
Conservative	Angela Gillespie	396	14.4	▼11.3
Conservative	Allison Hartshorn	347	12.6	
Conservative	Graham Moon	325	11.8	
Liberal Democrats	Ayo Mohammed	274	10.0	▲1.3
Turnout		8,255		
Labour hold		Swing		
Labour hold		Swing		
Labour hold		Swing		

=== 2022 election ===
The election took place on 5 May 2022.

2022 Bexley London Borough Council election: Thamesmead East
Party	Candidate	Votes	%	±%
Labour	Larry Ferguson	1,703	74.6	
Labour	Zainab Asunramu	1,678	73.5	
Labour	Mabel Ogundayo	1,661	72.8	+6.0
Conservative	Graham Moon	586	25.7	
Conservative	Natalie Price	558	24.5	
Conservative	Rajinder Tumber	462	20.2	
Liberal Democrats	Doro Oddiri	198	8.7	
Turnout		6,846	24.4	−4.95
Labour hold		Swing		
Labour hold		Swing		
Labour hold		Swing		

=== 2018 election ===
The election took place on 3 May 2018.

2018 Bexley London Borough Council election: Thamesmead East
Party	Candidate	Votes	%	±%
Labour	Esther Amaning	1,932	69.5	
Labour	Danny Hackett	1,868	67.2	
Labour	Mabel Ogundayo	1,856	66.8	
Conservative	Mark Brooks	661	23.8	
Conservative	Elzbieta Boryslawska	596	21.4	
Conservative	Bonny Umeadi	490	17.6	
CPA	Endy Ezenwata	270	9.7	
Turnout		2,852	29.3	
Labour win (new boundaries)				
Labour win (new boundaries)				
Labour win (new boundaries)				

== 2002–2018 Bexley council elections ==
Thamesmead East ward boundaries from 2002 to 2018

There was a revision of ward boundaries in Bexley in 2002.

=== 2014 election ===
The election took place on 22 May 2014.

2014 Bexley London Borough Council election: Thamesmead East
Party	Candidate	Votes	%	±%
Labour	Derry Begho	1,731	64.4	
Labour	Mabel Ogundayo	1,693	63.0	
Labour	Endy Ezenwata	1,687	62.8	
Conservative	Irene Reader	719	26.8	
Conservative	Natalie Read	667	24.8	
Conservative	Diana Sudds	633	23.6	
Turnout		2,686	32.8	
Labour hold		Swing		
Labour hold		Swing		
Labour hold		Swing		

=== 2010 election ===
The election on 6 May 2010 took place on the same day as the United Kingdom general election.

2010 Bexley London Borough Council election: Thamesmead East
Party	Candidate	Votes	%	±%
Labour	Sandra Bauer	2,528	46.7	
Labour	Munir Malik	2,067		
Labour	Harry Persaud	2,058		
Conservative	Tessa Craig	1,195	22.1	
Conservative	Michael Alldis	1,119		
Conservative	Dee Patel	1,026		
Independent	Tinuola Adeyemi	754	13.9	
BNP	Ben Scott	553	10.2	
CPA	Anthony Olusuyi	380	7.0	
CPA	Emeka Nwagbara	223		
CPA	Fabian Karawusa	199		
Turnout			46.0	
Labour hold		Swing		
Labour hold		Swing		
Labour hold		Swing		

=== 2006 election ===
The election took place on 4 May 2006.

2006 Bexley London Borough Council election: Thamesmead East
Party	Candidate	Votes	%	±%
Labour	Sandra Bauer	1,071	49.1	
Labour	Harbans Buttar	983		
Labour	Harry Persaud	956		
Thamesmead Community Party	Jenny Bellinger	628	28.8	
Thamesmead Community Party	Jeremy Cotton	573		
Thamesmead Community Party	Anthony Cusack	544		
Conservative	Irene Reader	483	22.1	
Conservative	Irma Nangon	438		
Conservative	Philip Read	228		
Turnout			26.2	
Labour hold		Swing		
Labour hold		Swing		
Labour hold		Swing		

=== 2002 election ===
The election took place on 2 May 2002.

2002 Bexley London Borough Council election: Thamesmead East
Party	Candidate	Votes	%	±%
Labour	Donna Briant	810	57.5	
Labour	Michael French	714		
Labour	Harbans Buttar	712		
Conservative	Edgar Silvester	304	21.6	
Conservative	Shirley Vick	296		
Liberal Democrats	Jeremy Cotton	295	20.9	
Liberal Democrats	Carol Folan	266		
Conservative	Priti Patel	259		
Liberal Democrats	John Wylie	251		
Turnout			18.3	
Labour win (new boundaries)				
Labour win (new boundaries)				
Labour win (new boundaries)				

== 1978–2002 Bexley council elections ==
Thamesmead East ward boundaries from 1978 to 2002

There was a revision of ward boundaries in Bexley in 1978.

=== 1998 election ===
The election on 7 May 1998 took place on the same day as the 1998 Greater London Authority referendum.

1998 Bexley London Borough Council election: Thamesmead East
Party	Candidate	Votes	%	±%
Labour	Donna Briant	1,096	61.51	▲4.01
Labour	Christopher Ball	1,065		
Labour	Michael French	946		
Conservative	Edgar Silvester	387	21.76	▼3.96
Conservative	Paul Stephen	357		
Conservative	Malcolm Styles	355		
Liberal Democrats	Jeremy Cotton	348	16.73	▼0.05
Liberal Democrats	Mark Curtis	309		
Liberal Democrats	Ramon Lee	188		
Registered electors		9,147		▼132
Turnout		1,942	21.23	▼14.49
Rejected ballots		9	0.46	▲0.34
Labour hold		Swing		
Labour hold		Swing		
Labour hold		Swing		

=== 1995 by-election ===
The by-election took place on 7 December 1995, following the death of Frank Barratt.

1995 Thamesmead East by-election
Party	Candidate	Votes	%	±%
Labour	Christopher Ball	825	67.1	
Liberal Democrats	Jeremy Cotton	253	20.6	
Conservative	Juliet Mankerty	151	12.3	
Majority		572	46.5	
Turnout		1,229	13.4	
Labour hold		Swing		

=== 1994 election ===
The election took place on 5 May 1994.

1994 Bexley London Borough Council election: Thamesmead East
Party	Candidate	Votes	%	±%
Labour	Frank Barratt	1,770	57.50	▼6.06
Labour	Donna Briant	1,731		
Labour	Ronald Brierly	1,669		
Conservative	Leo Belcham	811	25.72	▼10.72
Conservative	Philip Read	770		
Conservative	Peter Reader	731		
Liberal Democrats	Christopher Eyre	515	16.78	New
Liberal Democrats	Ronald Higginson	498		
Liberal Democrats	Hannah Williams	496		
Registered electors		9,279		▼338
Turnout		3,314	35.72	▲2.39
Rejected ballots		4	0.12	▼0.32
Labour hold		Swing		
Labour hold		Swing		
Labour hold		Swing		

=== 1990 election ===
The election took place on 3 May 1990.

1990 Bexley London Borough Council election: Thamesmead East
Party	Candidate	Votes	%	±%
Labour	Donna Brierly	2,101	63.56	
Labour	Frank Barratt	2,014		
Labour	Ronald Brierly	1,903		
Conservative	Michael Crouch	1,198	36.44	
Conservative	Andrew Murray	1,168		
Conservative	Eric Wilcox	1,084		
Registered electors		9,617		
Turnout		3,205	33.33	
Labour hold		Swing		
Labour hold		Swing		
Labour hold		Swing		

=== 1986 election ===
The election took place on 8 May 1986.

1986 Bexley London Borough Council election: Thamesmead East
Party	Candidate	Votes	%	±%
Labour	James Dawson	1,500		
Labour	Donna Brierly	1,228		
Labour	Jennifer Wall	1,225		
Conservative	Robert Parish	825		
Alliance (SDP)	Kevin Hopkins	823		
Conservative	Alan Turner	800		
Conservative	George Porter	784		
Alliance (SDP)	Thomas Lye	655		
Alliance (SDP)	Philip Satoor	596		
Turnout				
Labour hold		Swing		
Labour hold		Swing		
Labour hold		Swing		

=== 1982 election ===
The election took place on 6 May 1982.

1982 Bexley London Borough Council election: Thamesmead East
Party	Candidate	Votes	%	±%
Labour	James Dawson	1,212		
Labour	Anthony West	1,099		
Labour	Frank Hammond	1,065		
Conservative	Michael Matthews	775		
Conservative	Peter Jackson	755		
Conservative	David Lowrie	693		
Alliance (SDP)	Gillian Macdonald	477		
Alliance (Liberal)	Ernest Wilson-Smith	383		
Alliance (Liberal)	Gladys Wilson-Smith	361		
Turnout				
Labour hold		Swing		
Labour hold		Swing		
Labour hold		Swing		

=== 1978 election ===
The election took place on 4 May 1978.

1978 Bexley London Borough Council election: Thamesmead East
Party	Candidate	Votes	%	±%
Labour	James Dawson	1,720		
Labour	Anthony West	1,521		
Labour	Alastair Matheson	1,498		
Conservative	Brian Carr	751		
Conservative	Livinus Dorrian	733		
Conservative	George Porter	709		
Turnout				
Labour win (new boundaries)				
Labour win (new boundaries)				
Labour win (new boundaries)				

== 1974–1978 Bexley council elections ==
Part of the existing ward of Belvedere was split off to create a new ward of Thamesmead East in 1974.

=== 1975 by-election ===
The by-election took place on 3 July 1975.

1975 Thamesmead East by-election
Party	Candidate	Votes	%	±%
Labour	Anthony West	838		
Conservative	Ralph Walden-Kaye	279		
National Front	Barry Draper	157		
Turnout			20.7	
Labour hold		Swing		

=== 1974 election ===
The election took place on 2 May 1974.

1974 Bexley London Borough Council election: Thamesmead East
Party	Candidate	Votes	%	±%
Labour	James Dawson	1,175		
Labour	Alastair Matheson	1,120		
Labour	L. Smith	1,051		
Conservative	G. Porter	352		
Conservative	R. Walden-Kaye	337		
Conservative	N. Tucker	301		
Turnout				
Labour win (new seat)				
Labour win (new seat)				
Labour win (new seat)				
