= Daniel Francis (politician) =

British politician

Daniel Francis MP
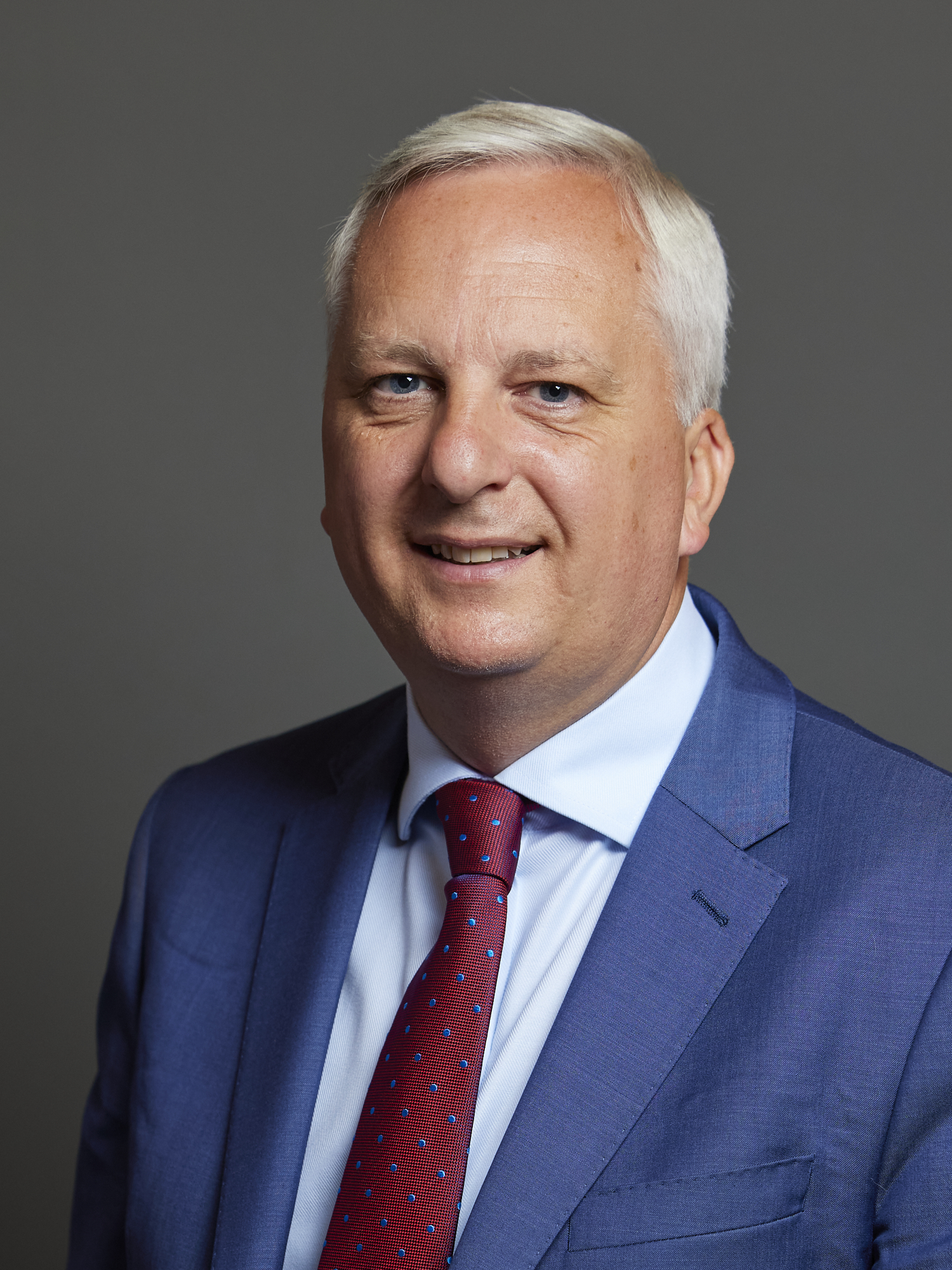
- Official portrait, 2024

Member of Parliament for Bexleyheath and Crayford
- Incumbent
- Assumed office 4 July 2024
- Preceded by: David Evennett
- Majority: 2,114 (4.9%)

Member of Bexley London Borough Council for Belvedere
- In office 22 May 2014 – 30 August 2024

Member of Bexley London Borough Council for Belvedere
- In office 28 September 2000 – 6 May 2010

Personal details
- Party: Labour

Daniel Francis is a British Labour Party politician who has been MP for Bexleyheath and Crayford since 2024. He served on Bexley Council as the councillor for the Belvedere ward from 2000 to 2010, and 2014 to 2024.

== Career ==
=== Belvedere Councillor ===
The Belvedere ward of the London Borough of Bexley held a councillor by-election in September 2000 due to a resignation, where Francis was elected with 55% of the vote. He won re-election in the subsequent 2002 and 2006 elections. During the 2010 council election, he instead ran for the Northumberland Heath ward where he lost. Returning to Belvedere ward, he successfully ran in the 2014, 2018, and 2022 elections.

Francis was the Cabinet Member for Transport and successfully fought for the extension of the Elizabeth line to Abbey Wood, and saved Welling to Victoria train services.

He led the Labour group on Bexley Council from 2017 to 2021, and was the Shadow cabinet member for Finance and Corporate Services until his election to Parliament.

=== Parliamentary ambitions ===
Francis was the Labour party candidate in the 2021 Old Bexley and Sidcup by-election, where he lost to the Conservative party's Louie French. He won in the Bexleyheath and Crayford constituency in the 2024 United Kingdom general election, swinging it to Labour for the first time since 2005.

Francis opposed Kim Leadbeater's bill introducing assisted suicide into law and served on the committee examining the legislation.

=== Other work ===
Daniel Francis is an unpaid director and shareholder of Community Conversations Ltd, along with his wife, who is also a director.

== Personal life ==
Francis was educated at Bexley Grammar School. He is married, and has two children.

He is interested in supporting children with disabilities, particularly cerebral palsy and epilepsy.

Parliament of the United Kingdom
| Preceded by David Evennett | Member of Parliament for Bexleyheath and Crayford; 2024–present | Incumbent |
