= 1990 Bexley London Borough Council election =

1990 local election in England

- 3 May 1990

All 62 seats up for election to Bexley London Borough Council 32 seats needed for a majority
- Registered: 167,570
- Turnout: 83,902, 50.07%

	First party	Second party	Third party
Leader	Len Newton	Donna Brierley	Unknown
Party	Conservative	Labour	Liberal Democrats
Leader since	1977	Unknown	Unknown
Leader's seat	Upton	Thameshead East	Unknown
Seats before	36	15	11
Seats after	35	18	9 (Note: Results include those from candidates listed under the name Lib Dem Focus Team)
Seat change	▼1	▲3	▼2
Popular vote	105,671	82,138	26,715
Percentage	48.05%	37.35%	12.15%
- Map of the results of the 1990 Bexley London Borough council election.
Council control before election
Conservative
Council control after election
Conservative

The 1990 Bexley Council election took place on 3 May 1990 to elect members of Bexley London Borough Council in London, England. The whole council was up for election and the Conservative Party stayed in overall control of the council.

== Election result ==
1990 Bexley London Borough Council election
Party	Seats	Gains	Losses	Net gain/loss	Seats %	Votes %	Votes	+/−
Conservative	35	2	3	▼1	56.45	48.05	105,671	
Labour	18	3	0	▲3	29.03	37.35	82,138	
Liberal Democrats	9	0	2	▼2	14.52	12.15	26,715	
SDP	0	0	0	0	0.00	2.16	4,760	
Independents against Poll Tax	0	0	0	0	0.00	0.30	656	
Total	62						219,940	

== Ward results ==
(*) - Indicates that the candidate is an incumbent councillor for that ward

(†) - Indicates a councillor who changed wards in between their last election and the current election

=== Barnehurst ===
Barnehurst (2)
Party	Candidate	Votes	%
Conservative	Richard Gillespie	1,334	55.92
Conservative	Ronald Barman*	1,273	
Labour	Kathleen Allen	762	29.03
Labour	Charan Athwal	591	
Liberal Democrats	John Cudmore	381	15.05
Liberal Democrats	Joan Longman	320	
Registered electors		4,838	
Turnout		2,507	51.82
Rejected ballots		3	0.12
Conservative hold			
Conservative hold			

=== Barnehurst North ===
Barnehurst North (1)
Party	Candidate	Votes	%
Conservative	John Bowes*	817	40.39
Labour	Trevor Perrin	668	33.02
Lib Dem Focus Team	Michael Longman	538	26.59
Registered electors		3,135	
Turnout		2,025	64.59
Rejected ballots		2	0.10
Conservative hold			

=== Belvedere ===
Belvedere (3)
Party	Candidate	Votes	%
Labour	Daniel Delaney*	2,489	57.24
Labour	Richard Lucas	2,167	
Labour	Geoffrey Dixon* (Note: Dixon replaced Cllr Camp after her resignation in 1988)	2,141	
Conservative	Hazel Adhihetty	1,739	42.76
Conservative	John Mankerty	1,678	
Conservative	Terence Connor	1,662	
Registered electors		9,637	
Turnout		4,499	46.68
Rejected ballots		24	0.53
Labour hold			
Labour hold			
Labour hold			

=== Blackfen ===
Blackfen (2)
Party	Candidate	Votes	%
Conservative	Barry Howard* (Note: Howard and Passey replaced Cllrs Boyd and Rose after their resignations in 1987)	1,233	49.66
Conservative	Margaret Passey*	1,212	
Liberal Democrats	Thomas Burnham	638	25.74
Labour	Bernard Laker	637	24.60
Liberal Democrats	Stephen Matthews	629	
Labour	Ernest Smith	575	
Registered electors		5,273	
Turnout		2,603	49.36
Rejected ballots		0	0.00
Conservative hold			
Conservative hold			

=== Blendon and Penhill ===
Blendon and Penhill (3)
Party	Candidate	Votes	%
Conservative	Beatrice Antenbring*	2,257	64.31
Conservative	Joan Stewart*	2.226	
Conservative	Edward Warbey* (Note: Warbey replaced Cllr Cassidy after his resignation in 1988)	2,177	
Labour	Ronnald Brown	871	24.94
Labour	John Taylor	866	
Labour	Alan Griffiths	845	
Liberal Democrats	Angela Nurse	410	10.75
Liberal Democrats	Margaret Shrimpton	366	
Liberal Democrats	Gillian Sathyamoorthy	338	
Registered electors		7,467	
Turnout		3,656	48.96
Rejected ballots		1	0.03
Conservative hold			
Conservative hold			
Conservative hold			

=== Bostall ===
Bostall (3)
Party	Candidate	Votes	%
Conservative	Alfred Charlton*	2,174	53.90
Conservative	Rita Sams* (Note: Sams replaced Cllr Belcham after his resignation in 1988)	2,003	
Conservative	John Wilkinson* (Note: Wilkinson replaced Cllr Bale after their death in 1987)	1,995	
Labour	Michael Barrett	1,255	30.77
Labour	Ronald Perrin	1,164	
Labour	Elizabeth Rhodes	1,104	
SDP	Gordon Roberts	417	9.59
SDP	Philip Satoor	345	
SDP	David Smith	337	
Independents against Poll Tax	Malcolm Macdonald	252	5.74
Independents against Poll Tax	Thomas Johnson	207	
Independents against Poll Tax	Derek Rance	197	
Registered electors		7,505	
Turnout		4,045	60.03
Rejected ballots		4	0.10
Conservative hold			
Conservative hold			
Conservative hold			

=== Brampton ===
Brampton (3)
Party	Candidate	Votes	%
Conservative	Stanley Carter*	2,273	51.44
Conservative	John Raggett*	2,192	
Conservative	Peter Smith	2,096	
Labour	Jonathan Ashby	1,391	31.91
Labour	Catherine Deadman	1,343	
Labour	Olive Squire	1,337	
Lib Dem Focus Team	Neil Arklie	608	13.38
Lib Dem Focus Team	Doreen La Roche	553	
Lib Dem Focus Team	Stuart White	547	
Independent	William Turner	139	3.27
Registered electors		8,021	
Turnout		4,321	53.87
Rejected ballots		3	0.07
Conservative hold			
Conservative hold			
Conservative hold			

=== Christchurch ===
Christchurch (3)
Party	Candidate	Votes	%
Conservative	Linda Bailey*	1,996	54.80
Conservative	Valerie Clark	1,936	
Conservative	Kenneth Rider*	1,838	
Labour	Patricia Cooper	1,194	31.83
Labour	Kenneth Duckworth	1,166	
Labour	Alan Scutt	990	
Liberal Democrats	Benjamin Hepworth	500	13.37
Liberal Democrats	Nigel Jackson	458	
Liberal Democrats	Betty Lockington	449	
Registered electors		7,927	
Turnout		3,782	47.71
Rejected ballots		1	0.03
Conservative hold			
Conservative hold			
Conservative hold			

=== Cray ===
Cray (2)
Party	Candidate	Votes	%
Conservative	John Harrington*	1,118	52.57
Conservative	Charlotte Brewster	1,073	
Labour	Annie Bramley	1,021	47.43
Labour	Richard Justham	957	
Registered electors		4,179	
Turnout		2,231	53.39
Rejected ballots		9	0.40
Conservative hold			
Conservative hold			

=== Crayford ===
Crayford (3)
Party	Candidate	Votes	%
Labour	Raymond Allen*	2,123	51.18
Labour	John Shepheard*	1,991	
Labour	June McKay* (Note: McKay replaced Cllr Penton after his resignation in 1988)	1,913	
Conservative	Maureen Wiltshire	1,535	38.14
Conservative	Dudley French	1,491	
Conservative	Daisy Clement	1,466	
SDP	Pamela Holman	419	10.68
Registered electors		8,904	
Turnout		4,209	47.27
Rejected ballots		3	0.07
Labour hold			
Labour hold			
Labour hold			

=== Danson ===
Danson (3)
Party	Candidate	Votes	%
Lib Dem Focus Team	Barry Standen*	1,756	47.11
Lib Dem Focus Team	Susan Hall*	1,741	
Lib Dem Focus Team	Edward Shrimpton* (Note: Shrimpton replaced Cllr Greville after his resignation in 1986)	1,683	
Conservative	Jasonn Haddon	1,333	35.00
Conservative	Richard Suchorzewski	1,264	
Conservative	Clinton Welch	1,251	
Labour	Peter Ashlee	694	17.89
Labour	David Prior	641	
Labour	Hilary Perrin	633	
Registered electors		7,378	
Turnout		3,888	52.70
Rejected ballots		2	0.05
Lib Dem Focus Team hold			
Lib Dem Focus Team hold			
Lib Dem Focus Team hold			

=== East Wickham ===
East Wickham (3)
Party	Candidate	Votes	%
Lib Dem Focus Team	John La Roche*	1,849	40.39
Lib Dem Focus Team	Keith Le Pla*	1,831	
Lib Dem Focus Team	Colin Wright*	1,753	
Conservative	Tindall Pamela	1,470	31.56
Conservative	Bryon Huson	1,402	
Conservative	John Waters	1,372	
Labour	John Barnshaw	1,279	28.06
Labour	David Hammond	1,261	
Labour	Robert Grant	1,235	
Registered electors		8,538	
Turnout		4,722	55.31
Rejected ballots		4	0.08
Lib Dem Focus Team hold			
Lib Dem Focus Team hold			
Lib Dem Focus Team hold			

=== Erith ===
Erith (3)
Party	Candidate	Votes	%
Labour	Valentine Morgan*	2,017	55.12
Labour	Ronald Browning*	1,989	
Labour	Singh Harbhajan*	1,836	
Conservative	Barry Chapman	1,322	35.28
Conservative	Margaret Reeve	1,208	
Conservative	Carol Wilkinson	1,207	
SDP	Frederick Plank	339	9.60
Registered electors		8,062	
Turnout		3,683	45.68
Rejected ballots		5	0.14
Labour hold			
Labour hold			
Labour hold			

=== Falconwood ===
Falconwood (1)
Party	Candidate	Votes	%
Conservative	Nigel Betts	699	42.03
Lib Dem Focus Team	Roger Pryor*	680	40.89
Labour	Gerda Slater	284	17.08
Registered electors		2,756	
Turnout		1,665	60.41
Rejected ballots		1	0.06
Conservative gain from Lib Dem Focus Team			

=== Lamorbey ===
Lamorbey (3)
Party	Candidate	Votes	%
Conservative	Alice Brewster*	2,257	57.12
Conservative	Graham Holland*	2,212	
Conservative	Ronald Passey*	2,097	
Labour	Timothy Drury	1,014	25.13
Labour	John Hall	948	
Labour	Ernest Simpson	926	
SDP	Colin Brown	695	17.75
SDP	Rosemary Gardner	679	
SDP	Theodora Plank	667	
Registered electors		7,655	
Turnout		4,094	53.48
Rejected ballots		7	0.17
Conservative hold			
Conservative hold			
Conservative hold			

=== North End ===
North End (3)
Party	Candidate	Votes	%
Labour	John Eastaugh*	2,296	67.04
Labour	Colin Hargrave*	2,274	
Labour	David Ives*	2,187	
Conservative	David Cook	883	24.91
Conservative	Marie Dwyer	874	
Conservative	David Wright	802	
SDP	Brian Reeves	320	9.34
Registered electors		8,362	
Turnout		3,736	44.68
Rejected ballots		14	0.37
Labour hold			
Labour hold			
Labour hold			

=== Northumberland Heath ===
Northumberland Heath (3)
Party	Candidate	Votes	%
Labour	Derek Enticknap^{†} (Note: Enticknap was a sitting councillor representing the Belvedere ward)	1,987	52.56
Labour	Shirley Gadson	1,880	
Labour	Ann Wheelock	1,865	
Conservative	Eric Reid	1,745	47.44
Conservative	Philip Read	1,729	
Conservative	Robert Parish	1,702	
Registered electors		7,787	
Turnout		4,037	51.84
Rejected ballots		13	0.32
Labour gain from Conservative			
Labour gain from Conservative			
Labour gain from Conservative			

=== St Mary's ===
St Mary's (3)
Party	Candidate	Votes	%
Conservative	Colin Campbell	2,998	64.51
Conservative	Alfred Catterall*	2,917	
Conservative	Colin Tandy*	2,853	
Labour	Harold Davis	1,094	23.53
Labour	David Hinds	1,076	
Labour	Sylvia Malt	1,029	
SDP	Michael Gardner	542	11.96
Registered electors		8,585	
Turnout		4,505	52.48
Rejected ballots		8	0.18
Conservative hold			
Conservative hold			
Conservative hold			

=== St Michael's ===
St Michael's (3)
Party	Candidate	Votes	%
Lib Dem Focus Team	Beryl Brand*	1,600	36.86
Lib Dem Focus Team	Eileen Wetheridge	1,436	
Lib Dem Focus Team	Steven Levine	1,430	
Conservative	Irmgard Hall	1,408	34.27
Conservative	Neil Sayers	1,389	
Conservative	Andrew Wicks	1,356	
Labour	Doreen Cameron	1,193	28.87
Labour	Alan Deadman	1,166	
Labour	James Love	1,138	
Registered electors		7,776	
Turnout		4,278	55.02
Rejected ballots		3	0.07
Lib Dem Focus Team hold			
Lib Dem Focus Team hold			
Lib Dem Focus Team hold			

=== Sidcup East ===
Sidcup East (3)
Party	Candidate	Votes	%
Conservative	June Slaughter*	2,252	54.69
Conservative	Margaret Flint*	2,240	
Conservative	Michael Slaughter*	2,214	
Labour	Carol Richardson	1,376	33.30
Labour	Margaret O'Neill	1,359	
Labour	Margaret Gostelow	1,348	
Liberal Democrats	Ann Atkins	510	12.01
Liberal Democrats	Dennis King	496	
Liberal Democrats	Patrick Spurge	466	
Registered electors		8,468	
Turnout		4,272	50.45
Rejected ballots		4	0.09
Conservative hold			
Conservative hold			
Conservative hold			

=== Sidcup West ===
Sidcup West (3)
Party	Candidate	Votes	%
Conservative	Malcolm Ketley*	2,450	64.55
Conservative	Peter Hadley	2,425	
Conservative	Kenneth McAndrew*	2,336	
Labour	Ian McGill	863	22.15
Labour	Peter Leaver	811	
Labour	Brian Preston	800	
Liberal Democrats	Angela Hamill	554	13.29
Liberal Democrats	Gillian Scott	483	
Liberal Democrats	Helen Mabbs	449	
Registered electors		7,866	
Turnout		3,903	49.62
Rejected ballots		6	0.15
Conservative hold			
Conservative hold			
Conservative hold			

=== Thamesmead East ===
Thamesmead East (3)
Party	Candidate	Votes	%
Labour	Donna Brierly*	2,101	63.56
Labour	Frank Barratt	2,014	
Labour	Ronald Brierly	1,903	
Conservative	Michael Crouch	1,198	36.44
Conservative	Andrew Murray	1,168	
Conservative	Eric Wilcox	1,084	
Registered electors		9,617	
Turnout		3,205	33.33
Rejected ballots		14	0.44
Labour hold			
Labour hold			
Labour hold			

=== Upton ===
Upton (3)
Party	Candidate	Votes	%
Conservative	Roy Ashmole*	1,999	51.97
Conservative	Leonard Newton*	1,909	
Conservative	Brian Sams*	1,852	
Labour	William Beazley	1,403	36.63
Labour	Selwyn Cooper	1,395	
Labour	James Sharp	1,262	
Liberal Democrats	Margaret Davey	431	11.40
Liberal Democrats	Frances Moore	424	
Liberal Democrats	Barbara Peters	408	
Registered electors		7,834	
Turnout		3,986	50.88
Rejected ballots		2	0.05
Conservative hold			
Conservative hold			
Conservative hold			
