= 1994 Bexley London Borough Council election =

1994 local election in England

- 5 May 1994

62 seats up for election to Bexley London Borough Council 32 seats needed for a majority
- Registered: 165,450
- Turnout: 82,116, 49.63% (▼0.44)

	First party	Second party	Third party
Leader	Len Newton	Donna Briant	Unknown
Party	Conservative	Labour	Liberal Democrats
Leader since	1977	Unknown	Unknown
Leader's seat	Upton	Thameshead East	Unknown
Seats before	34	19	9
Seats won	24	24	14
Seat change	▼10	▲5	▲5
Popular vote	79,619	78,584	52,943
Percentage	37.40%	36.92%	24.61%
Council control before election
Conservative
Council control after election
No Overall Control

The 1994 Bexley Council election took place on 5 May 1994 to elect members of Bexley London Borough Council in London, England. The whole council was up for election and the council went in no overall control.

== Election result ==
1994 Bexley London Borough Council local elections
Party	Seats	Gains	Losses	Net gain/loss	Seats %	Votes %	Votes	+/−
Conservative	24	0	10	▼10	38.71	37.40	79,619	▼10.45
Labour	24	5	0	▲5	38.71	36.92	78,584	▼0.43
Liberal Democrats	14	5	0	▲5	22.58	24.61	52,943	▲12.46
Independent	0	0	0	0	0.00	0.77	1,658	New
Natural Law Party	0	0	0	0	0.00	0.03	59	New
Total	62						215,137	

== Ward results ==
=== Barnehurst ===
Barnehurst (2)
Party	Candidate	Votes	%	±%
Conservative	Richard Gillespie*	1,051	45.47	▼10.45
Conservative	Ronald Barman*	1,018		
Labour	Kathleen Allen	820	34.49	▲5.46
Labour	Leslie White	750		
Liberal Democrats	Peter Davey	504	20.03	▲4.98
Liberal Democrats	Brian Toward	408		
Registered electors		4,805		▼33
Turnout		2,467	51.34	▼0.48
Rejected ballots		4	0.16	▲0.04
Conservative hold				
Conservative hold				

=== Barnehurst North ===
Barnehurst North (1)
Party	Candidate	Votes	%	±%
Labour	Trevor Perrin	852	42.86	▲9.84
Conservative	John Bowes*	813	40.90	▲0.41
Liberal Democrats	Neil Arklie	323	16.25	▼10.34
Registered electors		3,157		▲22
Turnout		1,990	63.03	▼1.56
Rejected ballots		2	0.10	Steady
Labour gain from Conservative				

=== Belvedere ===
Belvedere (3)
Party	Candidate	Votes	%	±%
Labour	Peter Hollamby	1,985	47.46	▼9.78
Labour	Richard Lucas*	1,918		
Labour	Brionie Huish	1,856		
Conservative	Mark Brooks	1,568	36.75	▼6.01
Conservative	Hazel Adhihetty	1,451		
Conservative	John Mankerty	1,441		
Liberal Democrats	Florence Jamieson	736	15.79	New
Liberal Democrats	Stephen Pamphilon	599		
Liberal Democrats	Ricky Richardson	581		
Registered electors		9,393		▼244
Turnout		4,484	47.74	▲1.06
Rejected ballots		7	0.16	▼0.37
Labour hold				
Labour hold				
Labour hold				

=== Blackfen ===
Blackfen (2)
Party	Candidate	Votes	%	±%
Liberal Democrats	Paul Hurren	1,071	40.46	▲14.73
Liberal Democrats	Peter Scopes	1,018		
Conservative	Barry Howard*	959	37.07	▼12.60
Conservative	Margaret Passey*	955		
Labour	Timothy Drury	631	22.47	▼2.14
Labour	Norman Robbins	529		
Registered electors		5,167		▼106
Turnout		2,745	53.13	▲3.77
Rejected ballots		1	0.04	▲0.04
Liberal Democrats gain from Conservative				
Liberal Democrats gain from Conservative				

=== Blendon and Penhill ===
Blendon and Penhill (3)
Party	Candidate	Votes	%	±%
Conservative	Beatrice Antenbring*	1,780	55.01	▼9.30
Conservative	Joan Stewart*	1,757		
Conservative	Edward Warbey*	1,716		
Labour	William Gilkison	860	26.14	▲1.20
Labour	David Hinds	849		
Labour	John Pegg	787		
Liberal Democrats	Roman Gregory	613	18.85	▲8.10
Liberal Democrats	Stephen Matthews	613		
Liberal Democrats	Doreen La Roche	574		
Registered electors		7,379		▼88
Turnout		3,391	45.95	▼3.01
Rejected ballots		4	0.12	▲0.09
Conservative hold				
Conservative hold				
Conservative hold				

=== Bostall ===
Bostall (3)
Party	Candidate	Votes	%	±%
Conservative	Alfred Charlton*	1,854	44.69	▼9.21
Conservative	Rita Sams*	1,669		
Conservative	John Wilkinson*	1,616		
Labour	Michael Barrett	1,301	32.06	▲1.29
Labour	Graeme Etheridge	1,243		
Labour	Peter Oakley	1,142		
Liberal Democrats	Donald McLaren	933	23.25	New
Liberal Democrats	Francoise Montford	872		
Liberal Democrats	Ramon Lee	868		
Registered electors		7,364		▼141
Turnout		4,121	55.96	▼4.07
Rejected ballots		2	0.05	▼0.05
Conservative hold				
Conservative hold				
Conservative hold				

=== Brampton ===
Brampton (3)
Party	Candidate	Votes	%	±%
Conservative	Stanley Carter*	1,749	44.19	▼7.25
Conservative	Ronald French	1,684		
Conservative	John Raggett*	1,654		
Labour	Margaret Gostelow	1,427	35.85	▲3.94
Labour	Teresa Pearce	1,370		
Labour	Ian Rashbrook	1,330		
Liberal Democrats	Heather Arklie	784	19.96	▲6.58
Liberal Democrats	Mary Cooke	783		
Liberal Democrats	Betty Lockington	731		
Registered electors		7,830		▼191
Turnout		4,090	52.23	▼1.64
Rejected ballots		10	0.24	▲0.17
Conservative hold				
Conservative hold				
Conservative hold				

=== Christchurch ===
Christchurch (3)
Party	Candidate	Votes	%	±%
Liberal Democrats	Margaret Davey	1,600	42.21	▲28.84
Liberal Democrats	Janice Purssey	1,584		
Liberal Democrats	Peter Smith	1,525		
Conservative	Linda Bailey*	1,361	35.39	▼19.41
Conservative	Valerie Clark*	1,318		
Conservative	Kenneth Rider*	1,269		
Labour	Steven Boxall	876	22.40	▼9.43
Labour	Kirsten Gibbs	826		
Labour	Alan Scutt	797		
Registered electors		7,822		▼105
Turnout		3,933	50.28	▲2.57
Rejected ballots		7	0.18	▲0.15
Liberal Democrats gain from Conservative				
Liberal Democrats gain from Conservative				
Liberal Democrats gain from Conservative				

=== Cray ===
Cray (2)
Party	Candidate	Votes	%	±%
Labour	Joel Briant	1,125	51.61	▲4.18
Labour	Richard Justham	1,069		
Conservative	John Harrington*	812	37.00	▼15.57
Conservative	John Hanson	761		
Liberal Democrats	Kenneth Bishop	251	11.39	New
Liberal Democrats	Lesley Dyball	233		
Registered electors		4,103		▼76
Turnout		2,274	55.42	▲2.03
Rejected ballots		6	0.26	▼0.14
Labour gain from Conservative				
Labour gain from Conservative				

=== Crayford ===
Crayford (3)
Party	Candidate	Votes	%	±%
Labour	Raymond Allen*	2,093	54.51	▲3.33
Labour	John Shepheard*	2,055		
Labour	June Wood	1,896		
Conservative	David Gleed	1,197	29.64	▼8.50
Conservative	Shirley Vick	1,053		
Conservative	Rosemary White	1,037		
Liberal Democrats	Roger Pryor	624	15.85	New
Liberal Democrats	Benjamin Hepworth	601		
Liberal Democrats	Agnes Rigby	532		
Registered electors		8,638		▼266
Turnout		4,072	47.14	▼0.13
Rejected ballots		6	0.15	▲0.08
Labour hold				
Labour hold				
Labour hold				

=== Danson ===
Danson (3)
Party	Candidate	Votes	%	±%
Liberal Democrats	Susan Hall*	1,984	57.15	▲10.04
Liberal Democrats	Barry Standen*	1,923		
Liberal Democrats	Edward Shrimpton*	1,913		
Conservative	Gareth Johnson	775	22.12	▼12.88
Conservative	Sharon Massey	767		
Labour	Peter Ashlee	730	20.73	▲2.84
Conservative	Ennis Smith	711		
Labour	Stephen Perfect	706		
Labour	Jean Robertson	675		
Registered electors		7,151		▼227
Turnout		3,608	50.45	▼2.25
Rejected ballots		0	0.00	▼0.05
Liberal Democrats hold				
Liberal Democrats hold				
Liberal Democrats hold				

=== East Wickham ===
East Wickham (3)
Party	Candidate	Votes	%	±%
Liberal Democrats	Janette Codd* (Note: Codd replaced Cllr Le Pla after his resignation in 1992)	1,749	42.62	▲2.23
Liberal Democrats	Colin Wright*	1,671		
Liberal Democrats	Brian Oliver	1,648		
Labour	Albert Aitkenhead	1,394	34.29	▲6.23
Labour	Gerda Slater	1,348		
Labour	Stuart Slater	1,335		
Conservative	Michael Crouch	943	23.09	▼8.47
Conservative	Neil Sayers	907		
Conservative	John Waters	896		
Registered electors		8,227		▼311
Turnout		4,197	51.01	▼4.30
Rejected ballots		7	0.17	▲0.09
Liberal Democrats hold				
Liberal Democrats hold				
Liberal Democrats hold				

=== Erith ===
Erith (3)
Party	Candidate	Votes	%	±%
Labour	Ronald Browning*	1,776	53.53	▼1.59
Labour	Valentine Morgan*	1,750		
Labour	Margaret O'Neill	1,659		
Conservative	Patricia Bowes	1,130	33.06	▼2.22
Conservative	Carol Wilkinson	1,072		
Conservative	Marilyn Parra	1,000		
Liberal Democrats	Philip Codd	443	13.40	New
Liberal Democrats	John Brand	441		
Liberal Democrats	Margaret Shrimpton	414		
Registered electors		8,040		▼428
Turnout		3,561	44.29	▼6.16
Rejected ballots		4	0.11	▲0.02
Labour hold				
Labour hold				
Labour hold				

=== Falconwood ===
Falconwood (1)
Party	Candidate	Votes	%	±%
Conservative	Nigel Betts*	815	44.17	▲2.14
Liberal Democrats	Eileen Wetheridge	780	42.28	▲1.39
Labour	Patrizia Astonn	250	13.55	▼3.53
Registered electors		2,975		▲219
Turnout		1,846	62.05	▲1.64
Rejected ballots		1	0.05	▼0.01
Conservative hold				

=== Lamorbey ===
Lamorbey (3)
Party	Candidate	Votes	%	±%
Conservative	Graham Holland*	2,124	53.72	▼3.40
Conservative	Alice Brewster*	2,071		
Conservative	Ronald Passey*	1,932		
Labour	Bernard Laker	1,036	26.40	▲1.27
Labour	Robert Justham	995		
Labour	Graeme Kinnaird	977		
Liberal Democrats	Thomas Burnham	802	19.88	New
Liberal Democrats	Angela Hamill	769		
Liberal Democrats	Michael Jaques	697		
Registered electors		7,927		▲272
Turnout		4,130	52.10	▼1.38
Rejected ballots		4	0.10	▼0.07
Conservative hold				
Conservative hold				
Conservative hold				

=== North End ===
North End (3)
Party	Candidate	Votes	%	±%
Labour	John Eastaugh*	2,230	64.44	▼2.60
Labour	David Ives*	2,158		
Labour	Colin Hargrave*	2,096		
Conservative	Marie Dwyer	819	22.88	▼2.03
Conservative	Dianne Joyce	760		
Conservative	Derek Hopper	723		
Liberal Democrats	Marie Edmead	441	12.68	New
Liberal Democrats	Alan Wakeman	419		
Liberal Democrats	Ethel Hepworth	416		
Registered electors		8,385		▲23
Turnout		3,743	44.64	▼0.04
Rejected ballots		7	0.19	▼0.18
Labour hold				
Labour hold				
Labour hold				

=== Northumberland Heath ===
Northumberland Heath (3)
Party	Candidate	Votes	%	±%
Labour	Derek Enticknap*	1,902	52.02	▼0.54
Labour	Shirley Gadson*	1,796		
Labour	Ann Wheelock*	1,753		
Conservative	Eric Reid	1,192	33.87	▼13.57
Conservative	Margaret Reeve	1,188		
Conservative	Daisy Clement	1,169		
Liberal Democrats	Kathleen Cavalli	509	14.11	New
Liberal Democrats	Paul Mendes	495		
Liberal Democrats	John Williams	474		
Registered electors		7,626		▼161
Turnout		3,799	49.82	▼2.02
Rejected ballots		5	0.13	▼0.19
Labour hold				
Labour hold				
Labour hold				

=== St Mary's ===
St Mary's (3)
Party	Candidate	Votes	%	±%
Conservative	Colin Campbell*	2,308	57.33	▼7.18
Conservative	Alfred Catterall*	2,233		
Conservative	Colin Tandy*	2,159		
Labour	John Hayward	874	21.47	▼2.06
Liberal Democrats	Angela Nurse	840	21.20	New
Liberal Democrats	David Nicolle	829		
Labour	Bernard Justham	824		
Labour	Anthony Oates	811		
Liberal Democrats	George Mabbs	808		
Registered electors		8,625		▲40
Turnout		4,141	48.01	▼4.47
Rejected ballots		4	0.10	▼0.08
Conservative hold				
Conservative hold				
Conservative hold				

=== St Michael's ===
St Michael's (3)
Party	Candidate	Votes	%	±%
Liberal Democrats	Beryl Brand*	1,727	42.49	▲5.63
Liberal Democrats	Peter Weston	1,606		
Liberal Democrats	Steven Levine*	1,597		
Labour	Christopher Ball	1,349	34.40	▲5.53
Labour	David Aston	1,341		
Labour	Doreen Cameron	1,301		
Conservative	Sylvia Cassells	919	23.11	▼11.16
Conservative	Paul Herbert	892		
Conservative	Andrew Wicks	870		
Registered electors		7,606		▼170
Turnout		4,139	54.42	▼0.60
Rejected ballots		9	0.22	▲0.15
Liberal Democrats hold				
Liberal Democrats hold				
Liberal Democrats hold				

=== Sidcup East ===
Sidcup East (3)
Party	Candidate	Votes	%	±%
Conservative	June Slaughter*	1,767	43.93	▼10.76
Conservative	Michael Slaughter*	1,751		
Conservative	Margaret Flint*	1,709		
Labour	Annie Bramley	1,067	26.48	▼6.82
Labour	John J.	1,057		
Labour	Paul Greening	1,027		
Liberal Democrats	Christopher Eady	589	14.16	▲2.15
Independent	Andrew Banks	583	13.94	New
Independent	Robert Griffiths	579		
Liberal Democrats	Gillian Scott	561		
Liberal Democrats	Jeremy Cotton	535		
Independent	Laurence Williams	496		
Natural Law Party	Robert Stephens	59	1.49	New
Registered electors		8,356		▼112
Turnout		4,119	49.29	▼1.16
Rejected ballots		3	0.07	▼0.02
Conservative hold				
Conservative hold				
Conservative hold				

=== Sidcup West ===
Sidcup West (3)
Party	Candidate	Votes	%	±%
Conservative	Malcolm Ketley*	1,921	52.14	▼12.41
Conservative	Peter Hadley*	1,877		
Conservative	Kenneth McAndrew*	1,800		
Liberal Democrats	Ann Atkins	917	23.38	▲9.91
Labour	Michelle Blackner	910	24.48	▲2.33
Labour	Elizabeth Rhodes	873		
Labour	David Prior	845		
Liberal Democrats	John La Roche	804		
Liberal Democrats	Jonathan Coninx	789		
Registered electors		7,831		▼35
Turnout		3,805	48.59	▼1.03
Rejected ballots		5	0.13	▼0.02
Conservative hold				
Conservative hold				
Conservative hold				

=== Thamesmead East ===
Thamesmead East (3)
Party	Candidate	Votes	%	±%
Labour	Frank Barratt*	1,770	57.50	▼6.06
Labour	Donna Briant	1,731		
Labour	Ronald Brierly*	1,669		
Conservative	Leo Belcham	811	25.72	▼10.72
Conservative	Philip Read	770		
Conservative	Peter Reader	731		
Liberal Democrats	Christopher Eyre	515	16.78	New
Liberal Democrats	Ronald Higginson	498		
Liberal Democrats	Hannah Williams	496		
Registered electors		9,279		▼338
Turnout		3,314	35.72	▲2.39
Rejected ballots		4	0.12	▼0.32
Labour hold				
Labour hold				
Labour hold				

=== Upton ===
Upton (3)
Party	Candidate	Votes	%	±%
Labour	Sylvia Malt* (Note: Sylvia replaced Cllr Sams following his death in 1993)	1,647	39.56	▲2.93
Labour	Harold Davis	1,553		
Labour	Kathryn Smith	1,511		
Conservative	Roy Ashmole*	1,446	36.23	▼15.74
Conservative	Leonard Newton*	1,444		
Conservative	William Flint	1,425		
Liberal Democrats	Roy Allsopp	1,033	24.21	▲13.19
Liberal Democrats	Doreen Gregory	937		
Liberal Democrats	Stuart White	913		
Registered electors		7,764		▼70
Turnout		4,147	53.41	▲2.53
Rejected ballots		0	0.00	▼0.05
Labour gain from Conservative				
Labour gain from Conservative				
Labour hold				
