= 1998 Bexley London Borough Council election =

1998 local election in England

- 7 May 1998

All 62 seats up for election to Bexley London Borough Council 32 seats needed for a majority
- Registered: 166,311
- Turnout: 59,610, 35.84% (▼13.79)

	First party	Second party
Leader	Michael A. Slaughter	Kathryn A. Smith
Party	Conservative	Labour
Leader since	Unknown	1996
Leader's seat	Sidcup East	Upton (Note: She didn't run in Upton this election, she instead ran for and won in the Northumberland Heath ward)
Last election	24 seats, 37.40%	24 seats, 36.92%
Seats before	22	24
Seats won	32	24
Seat change	▲8	Steady
Popular vote	63,605	62,162
Percentage	40.89%	39.97%
Swing	▲3.49	▲3.05
	Third party	Fourth party
Leader	Unknown	Unknown
Party	Liberal Democrats	Independent
Leader since	Unknown	Unknown
Last election	14 seats, 24.61%	0 seats, 0.77%
Seats before	14	1
Seats won	6	0
Seat change	▼8	Steady
Popular vote	29,060	76
Percentage	18.68%	0.05%
Swing	▼5.93	▼0.72
Council control before election
No Overall Control
Council control after election
Conservative

Elections to Bexley London Borough Council were held on 7 May 1998. The whole council was up for election and the Conservative Party gained control of the council from no overall control. The electoral system used was the "first past the post", meaning that each seat was given to the candidate with the most votes.

== Background ==
In the intervening years between elections there were a total of 4 by-elections caused by the resignation and death of several councillors, however none of these by-elections resulted in seats changing parties. In addition to this there was one change of allegiance from the Conservatives as well as one Conservative seat that was left vacant shortly before the election, meaning the composition of the council just prior to the election was as follows:

↓
24	14	1	22	1
Labour	Lib Dem	Ind	Con	Vacant

== Election results ==
1998 Bexley London Borough Council elections
Party	Seats	Gains	Losses	Net gain/loss	Seats %	Votes %	Votes	+/−
Conservative	32	8	0	▲8	51.61	40.89	63,605	▲3.49
Labour	24	3	3	Steady	38.71	39.97	62,162	▲3.05
Liberal Democrats	6	0	8	▼8	9.68	18.68	29,060	▼5.93
BNP	0	0	0	Steady	0.00	0.35	543	New
Monster Raving Loony	0	0	0	Steady	0.00	0.06	94	New
Independent	0	0	0	Steady	0.00	0.05	76	▼0.72
Total	62						155,540	

After the election, the composition of the council was as follows:

↓
24	6	32
Labour	Lib Dem	Con

== Ward results ==
(*) - Indicates an incumbent candidate

(†) - Indicates an incumbent candidate standing in a different ward

=== Barnehurst ===
Barnehurst (2)
Party	Candidate	Votes	%	±%
Conservative	Richard Gillespie*	977	52.94	▲7.47
Conservative	Mark Brooks	971		
Labour	Matthew Murphy	706	37.23	▲2.74
Labour	Leslie White	664		
Liberal Democrats	Ann Atkins	183	9.84	▼10.19
Liberal Democrats	Mary Cooke	179		
Registered electors		4,800		▼5
Turnout		1,979	41.23	▼10.11
Rejected ballots		8	0.40	▲0.24
Conservative hold				
Conservative hold				

=== Barnehurst North ===
Barnehurst North (1)
Party	Candidate	Votes	%	±%
Labour	Elizabeth French^{†} (Note: French was a sitting councillor representing the Erith ward. She was elected in a by-election triggered by the resignation of Cllr Morgan in 1996)	681	46.58	▲3.72
Conservative	John Bowes	642	43.91	▲3.01
Liberal Democrats	Michael Stanley	139	9.51	▼6.74
Registered electors		3,144		▼13
Turnout		1,463	46.53	▼16.50
Rejected ballots		1	0.07	▼0.03
Labour hold				

=== Belvedere ===
Belvedere (3)
Party	Candidate	Votes	%	±%
Labour	Richard Lucas*	1,325	52.65	▲5.19
Labour	Peter Hollamby*	1,321		
Labour	Doreen Cameron	1,291		
Conservative	John Mankerty	842	32.99	▼3.76
Conservative	Patricia Bowes	834		
Conservative	Shirley Vick	791		
Liberal Democrats	Philip Codd	385	14.36	▼1.43
Liberal Democrats	William Shrimpton	349		
Liberal Democrats	Benjamin Hepworth	340		
Registered electors		9,307		▼86
Turnout		2,727	29.30	▼18.44
Rejected ballots		10	0.37	▲0.21
Labour hold				
Labour hold				
Labour hold				

=== Blackfen ===
Blackfen (2)
Party	Candidate	Votes	%	±%
Conservative	Margaret Cammish	760	40.27	▲3.20
Conservative	Christopher Garland	736		
Liberal Democrats	Paul Hurren*	615	32.03	▼8.43
Liberal Democrats	Peter Scopes*	575		
Labour	Nina Justham	558	27.70	▲5.23
Labour	John Pegg	471		
Registered electors		5,156		▼11
Turnout		1,993	38.65	▼14.48
Rejected ballots		5	0.25	▲0.21
Conservative gain from Liberal Democrats				
Conservative gain from Liberal Democrats				

=== Blendon and Penhill ===
Blendon and Penhill (3)
Party	Candidate	Votes	%	±%
Conservative	Beatrice Antenbring*	1,709	54.72	▼0.29
Conservative	Neil Sayers	1,668		
Conservative	Ann Partington	1,658		
Labour	Catherine Deadman	957	30.40	▲4.26
Labour	David Prior	933		
Labour	Gerda Slater	907		
Liberal Democrats	Peggy Wagstaff	393	12.40	▼6.45
Liberal Democrats	Paul Hurren	383		
Liberal Democrats	Colin Wright	365		
BNP	Colin Smith	80	2.48	New
BNP	Pauline Smith	75		
BNP	Susan Turner	73		
Registered electors		7,320		▼59
Turnout		3,145	42.96	▼2.99
Rejected ballots		3	0.10	▼0.02
Conservative hold				
Conservative hold				
Conservative hold				

=== Bostall ===
Bostall (3)
Party	Candidate	Votes	%	±%
Conservative	Richard Morgan	1,148	37.94	▼6.75
Conservative	Ian Clement	1,123		
Conservative	John Wilkinson*	1,113		
Labour	Raymond Allen^{†} (Note: Allen was a sitting councillor representing the Crayford)	978	31.88	▼0.18
Liberal Democrats	Francoise Montford	933	30.18	▲6.93
Labour	Patrick Gale	933		
Labour	Jean Robertson	932		
Liberal Democrats	Alan Bone	887		
Liberal Democrats	David Montford	863		
Registered electors		7,367		▲3
Turnout		3,178	43.14	▼12.82
Rejected ballots		2	0.06	▲0.01
Conservative hold				
Conservative hold				
Conservative hold				

=== Brampton ===
Brampton (3)
Party	Candidate	Votes	%	±%
Conservative	Ronald French*	1,582	47.97	▲3.78
Conservative	Teresa O'Neill	1,560		
Conservative	Cheryl Potter	1,475		
Labour	Ronald Brown	1,440	41.33	▲5.48
Labour	Edna Cook	1,328		
Labour	Gabriel Muruako	1,210		
Liberal Democrats	Heather Arklie	361	10.70	▼9.26
Liberal Democrats	John Brand	358		
Liberal Democrats	Betty Lockington	311		
Registered electors		7,839		▲9
Turnout		3,451	44.02	
Rejected ballots		11	0.32	▲0.08
Conservative hold				
Conservative hold				
Conservative hold				

=== Christchurch ===
Christchurch (3)
Party	Candidate	Votes	%	±%
Conservative	Linda Bailey	1,310	44.19	▲8.80
Conservative	Gareth Johnson	1,194		
Conservative	Sharon Massey	1,168		
Liberal Democrats	Margaret Davey*	830	28.21	▼14.00
Labour	Patricia Ball	801	27.61	▲5.21
Liberal Democrats	Peter Davey	767		
Labour	Alan Scutt	754		
Liberal Democrats	Peter Smith*	747		
Labour	Colin Dawes	739		
Registered electors		7,855		▲33
Turnout		2,988	38.04	▼12.24
Rejected ballots		12	0.40	▲0.22
Conservative gain from Liberal Democrats				
Conservative gain from Liberal Democrats				
Conservative gain from Liberal Democrats				

=== Cray ===
Cray (2)
Party	Candidate	Votes	%	±%
Labour	Joel Briant*	858	58.30	▲6.69
Labour	Richard Justham*	856		
Conservative	John Harrington	650	41.70	▲4.70
Conservative	John Hanson	576		
Registered electors		4,050		▼53
Turnout		1,616	39.90	▼15.52
Rejected ballots		14	0.87	▲0.61
Labour hold				
Labour hold				

=== Crayford ===
Crayford (3)
Party	Candidate	Votes	%	±%
Labour	John Shepheard*	1,475	55.07	▲0.56
Labour	Tonya Kelsey	1,415		
Labour	Trevor Perrin^{†} (Note: Perrin was a sitting councillor representing the Barnehurst North ward)	1,384		
Conservative	Robert Stead	809	29.74	▲0.10
Conservative	Daisy Clement	753		
Conservative	Daisy Clement	746		
Liberal Democrats	John Cudmore	312	11.13	▼4.72
Liberal Democrats	William Boyd	307		
Liberal Democrats	Agnes Rigby	245		
BNP	Colin Smith	112	4.06	New
BNP	Pauline Smith	106		
BNP	Susan Turner	97		
Registered electors		8,522		▼116
Turnout		2,775	32.56	▼14.58
Rejected ballots		12	0.43	▲0.28
Labour hold				
Labour hold				
Labour hold				

=== Danson ===
Danson (3)
Party	Candidate	Votes	%	±%
Liberal Democrats	Barry Standen*	1,155	49.84	▼7.31
Liberal Democrats	Edward Shrimpton*	1,138		
Liberal Democrats	Sylvia Fortune	1,135		
Labour	Richard Downer	617	26.49	▲5.76
Labour	Stephen Perfect	606		
Labour	John Shaw	599		
Conservative	Michael Crouch	582	23.67	▲1.55
Conservative	John Raggett^{†} (Note: Raggett was a sitting councillor representing the Brampton ward)	535		
Conservative	Gerald Quieros	511		
Registered electors		7,246		▲95
Turnout		2,454	33.87	▼16.58
Rejected ballots		5	0.20	▲0.20
Liberal Democrats hold				
Liberal Democrats hold				
Liberal Democrats hold				

=== East Wickham ===
East Wickham (3)
Party	Candidate	Votes	%	±%
Liberal Democrats	Nicholas O'Hare	1,143	38.06	▼4.56
Labour	John Lawreson	1.098	37.81	▲3.52
Liberal Democrats	Brian Oliver*	1,072		
Labour	Stuart Slater	1,068		
Labour	Maxine L. Pieri	1,060		
Liberal Democrats	Colin Wright*	1,033		
Conservative	Terence Connor	642	21.46	▼1.63
Conservative	Peter Hadley^{†} (Note: Hadley was a sitting councillor representing the Sidcup West ward)	609		
Conservative	John Waters	580		
Independent	Derek Wrench	76	2.67	New
Registered electors		8,153		▼74
Turnout		2,977	36.51	▼14.50
Rejected ballots		12	0.40	▲0.23
Liberal Democrats hold				
Labour gain from Liberal Democrats				
Liberal Democrats hold				

=== Erith ===
Erith (3)
Party	Candidate	Votes	%	±%
Labour	Ronald Browning*	1,183	61.03	▲7.50
Labour	Teresa Pearce	1,114		
Labour	Margaret O'Neill*	1,110		
Conservative	Carol Wilkinson	539	28.35	▼4.71
Conservative	Bernard Gillespie	529		
Conservative	Desmond Howe	515		
Liberal Democrats	Stanley Vince	221	10.62	▼2.78
Liberal Democrats	Janette Codd^{†} (Note: Codd was a sitting councillor representing the East Wickham ward)	188		
Liberal Democrats	Margaret Shrimpton	184		
Registered electors		8,207		▲167
Turnout		2,061	25.12	▼19.17
Rejected ballots		13	0.63	▲0.52
Labour hold				
Labour hold				
Labour hold				

=== Falconwood ===
Falconwood (1)
Party	Candidate	Votes	%	±%
Conservative	Nigel Betts*	641	48.67	▲4.50
Liberal Democrats	Eileen Wetheridge	405	30.75	▼11.53
Labour	Patrizia Aston	271	20.58	▲7.03
Registered electors		2,940		▲35
Turnout		1,324	45.03	▼17.02
Rejected ballots		6	0.45	▲0.40
Conservative hold				

=== Lamorbey ===
Lamorbey (3)
Party	Candidate	Votes	%	±%
Conservative	Graham Holland*	1,796	58.68	▲4.96
Conservative	Aileen Beckwith	1,644		
Conservative	Ronald Passey*	1,601		
Labour	Sarah King	953	30.75	▲4.35
Labour	Robert Justham	876		
Labour	Graeme Kinnaird	812		
Liberal Democrats	Terry Brown	350	10.57	▼9.31
Liberal Democrats	Doreen La Roche	297		
Liberal Democrats	John La Roche	261		
Registered electors		8,134		▲207
Turnout		3,131	38.49	▼13.61
Rejected ballots		20	0.64	▲0.54
Conservative hold				
Conservative hold				
Conservative hold				

=== North End ===
North End (3)
Party	Candidate	Votes	%	±%
Labour	John Eastaugh*	1,293	65.62	▲1.18
Labour	David Ives*	1,282		
Labour	Colin Hargrave*	1,188		
Conservative	Peter Reader	509	24.82	▲1.94
Conservative	Sylvia Casse;;s	463		
Conservative	Andrew Wicks	451		
Liberal Democrats	Kaye Cudmore	190	9.56	▼3.12
Liberal Democrats	Roger Pryor	181		
Liberal Democrats	Lesley Burton	177		
Registered electors		8,660		▲275
Turnout		2,160	24.94	▼19.70
Rejected ballots		13	0.60	▲0.41
Labour hold				
Labour hold				
Labour hold				

=== Northumberland Heath ===
Northumberland Heath (3)
Party	Candidate	Votes	%	±%
Labour	Geoffrey Hacker	1,324	55.19	▲3.17
Labour	Mary Lucas* (Note: Lucas was elected in a by-election triggered by the death of Cllr Wheelock in 1995)	1,296		
Labour	Kathryn Smith^{†} (Note: Smith was a sitting councillor representing the Upton ward)	1,224		
Conservative	Margaret Compton	834	34.00	▲0.13
Conservative	Neil Cuthill	790		
Conservative	Juliet Mankerty	744		
Liberal Democrats	Florence Jamieson	290	10.81	▼3.30
Liberal Democrats	David Nicolle	234		
Liberal Democrats	Wendy Wright	229		
Registered electors		8,001		▲375
Turnout		2,502	31.27	▼18.55
Rejected ballots		9	0.36	▲0.23
Labour hold				
Labour hold				
Labour hold				

=== St Mary's ===
St Mary's (3)
Party	Candidate	Votes	%	±%
Conservative	Colin Campbell*	2,027	62.09	▲4.76
Conservative	Alfred Catterall*	1,990		
Conservative	Colin Tandy*	1,896		
Labour	Ian Rashbrook	837	25.73	▲4.26
Labour	Bernard Justham	821		
Labour	Josephine Chodha	793		
Liberal Democrats	Ian Breed	406	12.18	▼9.02
Liberal Democrats	Janet Standen	389		
Liberal Democrats	Christopher Eady	365		
Registered electors		8,665		▲40
Turnout		3,390	39.12	▼8.89
Rejected ballots		10	0.29	▲0.19
Conservative hold				
Conservative hold				
Conservative hold				

=== St Michael's ===
St Michael's (3)
Party	Candidate	Votes	%	±%
Labour	Grant Blowers	1,194	41.25	▲6.85
Labour	Wendy Perfect	1,132		
Liberal Democrats	Beryl Brand*	1,095	36.53	▼5.96
Labour	Carol Pieri	1,062		
Liberal Democrats	Peter Weston*	964		
Liberal Democrats	Sharon Roberts	942		
Conservative	Valerie Clark	648	22.22	▼0.89
Conservative	Daniel Mathews	598		
Conservative	Neil Sayers	579		
Registered electors		7,663		▲57
Turnout		2,954	38.55	▼15.87
Rejected ballots		7	0.24	▲0.02
Labour gain from Liberal Democrats				
Labour gain from Liberal Democrats				
Liberal Democrats hold				

=== Sidcup East ===
Sidcup East (3)
Party	Candidate	Votes	%	±%
Conservative	William Flint*	1,617	49.77	▲5.84
Conservative	June Slaughter*	1,559		
Conservative	Michael Slaughter*	1,505		
Labour	David Hinds	1.140	34.94	▲8.46
Labour	Sean Reed	1,134		
Labour	Asadullah-Al Khalid	1,012		
Liberal Democrats	Janice Wiliams	409	12.29	▼1.87
Liberal Democrats	Dennis Parks	384		
Liberal Democrats	John Williams	363		
Monster Raving Loony	Laurence Williams	94	3.00	New
Registered electors		8,557		▲201
Turnout		3,290	38.45	▼10.84
Rejected ballots		10	0.30	▲0.23
Conservative hold				
Conservative hold				
Conservative hold				

=== Sidcup West ===
Sidcup West (3)
Party	Candidate	Votes	%	±%
Conservative	Gareth Bacon	1,573	56.22	▲4.08
Conservative	Malcolm Ketley*	1,551		
Conservative	Kenneth McAndrew*	1,489		
Labour	Carol Beckwith	820	28.56	▲4.08
Labour	John Twelvetrees	790		
Labour	Elizabeth Rhodes	734		
Liberal Democrats	Robin Kelly	422	15.22	▼8.16
Liberal Democrats	Gillian Eady	418		
Liberal Democrats	Peter Morris	409		
Registered electors		7,862		▲31
Turnout		2,923	37.18	▼11.41
Rejected ballots		20	0.68	▲0.55
Conservative hold				
Conservative hold				
Conservative hold				

=== Thamesmead East ===
Thamesmead East (3)
Party	Candidate	Votes	%	±%
Labour	Donna Briant*	1,096	61.51	▲4.01
Labour	Christopher Ball* (Note: Ball was elected in a by-election triggered by the death of Cllr Barratt in 1995)	1,065		
Labour	Michael French	946		
Conservative	Edgar Silvester	387	21.76	▼3.96
Conservative	Paul Stephen	357		
Conservative	Malcolm Styles	355		
Liberal Democrats	Jeremy Cotton	348	16.73	▼0.05
Liberal Democrats	Mark Curtis	309		
Liberal Democrats	Ramon Lee	188		
Registered electors		9,147		▼132
Turnout		1,942	21.23	▼14.49
Rejected ballots		9	0.46	▲0.34
Labour hold				
Labour hold				
Labour hold				

=== Upton ===
Upton (3)
Party	Candidate	Votes	%	±%
Conservative	Roy Ashmole	1,436	47.32	▲11.09
Conservative	David Cammish	1,412		
Conservative	Leonard Newton	1,314		
Labour	Sylvia Malt*	1,287	42.01	▲2.45
Labour	Denis Daniels	1,269		
Labour	Garth Pilling-Lindsell	1,139		
Liberal Democrats	Diane Davey	367	10.67	▼13.54
Liberal Democrats	Angela Thick	287		
Liberal Democrats	Hannah Williams	285		
Registered electors		7,716		▼48
Turnout		3,187	41.30	▼12.11
Rejected ballots		11	0.35	▲0.35
Conservative gain from Labour				
Conservative gain from Labour				
Conservative gain from Labour				
