= Belvedere (ward) =

Electoral division in the London Borough of Bexley

- Electoral ward for the Bexley London Borough Council
- Belvedere ward boundaries since 2018
- Borough: Bexley
- County: Greater London
- Population: 17,690 (2021)
- Electorate: 11,685 (2022)
- Area: 4.670 square kilometres (1.803 sq mi)

Current electoral ward
- Created: 1965
- Number of members: 3
- Councillors: Sally Hinkley; Esther Amaning; Jeremy Fosten
- GSS code: E05011218 (2018–present)

Belvedere is an electoral ward in the London Borough of Bexley. The ward was first used in the 1964 elections. It returns three councillors to Bexley London Borough Council.

== Bexley council elections since 2018 ==
There was a revision of ward boundaries in Bexley in 2018.

=== 2024 by-election ===
The by-election took place on 17 October 2024, following the resignation of Daniel Francis.

2024 Belvedere by-election
Party	Candidate	Votes	%	±%
Labour	Jeremy Fosten	862		
Conservative	Christine Bishop	713		
Reform	Michael Pastor	378		
Green	Sarah Barry	157		
Liberal Democrats	David McBride	127		
Turnout				
Labour hold		Swing		

=== 2022 election ===
The election took place on 5 May 2022.

2022 Bexley London Borough Council election: Belvedere
Party	Candidate	Votes	%	±%
Labour	Sally Hinkley	2,033	61.0	−0.3
Labour	Esther Amaning	1,998	60.0	−9.5
Labour	Daniel Francis	1,956	58.7	−1.4
Conservative	Christine Bishop	1,278	38.4	−10.5
Conservative	William Dorgu	1,126	33.8	
Conservative	Viny Poon	1,072	32.2	
Green	Sarah Barry	533	16.0	
Turnout		9,996	31.3	−2.68
Labour hold		Swing		
Labour hold		Swing		
Labour hold		Swing		

=== 2018 election ===
The election took place on 3 May 2018.

2018 Bexley London Borough Council election: Belvedere
Party	Candidate	Votes	%	±%
Labour	Sally Hinkley	2,403	61.3	
Labour	Daniel Francis	2,353	60.1	
Labour	Dave Putson	2,307	58.9	
Conservative	Graham Moon	1,457	37.2	
Conservative	Frazer Brooks	1,429	36.5	
Conservative	Natalie Price	1,330	34.0	
Turnout		3,980	34.0	
Labour win (new boundaries)				
Labour win (new boundaries)				
Labour win (new boundaries)				

== 2002–2018 Bexley council elections ==
There was a revision in ward boundaries in Bexley in 2002.

=== 2014 election ===
The election took place on 22 May 2014.

2014 Bexley London Borough Council election: Belvedere
Party	Candidate	Votes	%	±%
Labour	Daniel Francis	1,546	18%	
Labour	Gillian Lesley MacDonald	1,506	17%	
Labour	Seán Bernard Newman	1,358	15%	
UKIP	Catherine Reilly	1,130	13%	
Conservative	Shirley Jean Vick	903	10%	
Conservative	Amandeep Singh Bhogal	862	10%	
Conservative	Pardeep Kaur Bhogal	838	10%	
BNP	Brian Haslam	328	4%	
CPA	Sid Cordle	143	2%	
CPA	Toyin Ogunyemi	78	1%	
CPA	Joel Ayodele Ogunyemi	72	1%	
Turnout		8,764		
Labour hold		Swing		
Labour hold		Swing		
Labour gain from Conservative		Swing		

=== 2010 election ===
The election on 6 May 2010 took place on the same day as the United Kingdom general election.

2010 Bexley London Borough Council election: Belvedere
Party	Candidate	Votes	%	±%
Labour	Gillian MacDonald	2,362	42.1	
Labour	Sean Newman	2,058		
Conservative	Kerry Allon	2,011	35.9	
Conservative	Mick Singh	1,972		
Conservative	David Leaf	1,963		
Labour	John Slater	1,857		
BNP	Neil Allen	671	12.0	
English Democrat	Sean Varnham	562	10.0	
Turnout			52.0	
Labour gain from Conservative		Swing		
Labour hold		Swing		
Conservative hold		Swing		

=== 2006 election ===
The election took place on 4 May 2006.

2006 Bexley London Borough Council election: Belvedere
Party	Candidate	Votes	%	±%
Conservative	David Leaf	1,287	43.0	
Labour	Daniel Francis	1,268	42.4	
Conservative	John Fuller	1,256		
Labour	Janet White	1,168		
Conservative	Gooroodev Nangon	1,050		
Labour	John Pegg	1,041		
Liberal Democrats	Lesley Morpurgo	439	14.7	
Turnout			35.9	
Conservative gain from Labour		Swing		
Labour hold		Swing		
Conservative gain from Labour		Swing		

=== 2002 election ===
The election took place on 2 May 2002.

2002 Bexley London Borough Council election: Belvedere
Party	Candidate	Votes	%	±%
Labour	Daniel Francis	1,228	55.4	
Labour	Richard Lucas	1,180		
Labour	Peter Hollamby	1,171		
Conservative	John Mankerty	767	34.6	
Conservative	Juliet Mankerty	716		
Conservative	Gooroodev Nangon	599		
UKIP	Paula Dunford	222	10.0	
Turnout			27.5	
Labour win (new boundaries)				
Labour win (new boundaries)				
Labour win (new boundaries)				

== 1978–2002 Bexley council elections ==
There was a revision in ward boundaries in Bexley in 1978.

=== 2000 by-election ===
The by-election was held on 28 September 2000, following the resignation of Doreen Cameron.

2000 Belvedere by-election
Party	Candidate	Votes	%
Labour	Daniel Francis	1,033	55.0
Conservative	Philip Brooks	672	35.8
Liberal Democrats	Anthony A. Pickett	174	9.3
Majority		361	19.2
Turnout		1,879	20.1
Labour hold			

=== 1998 election ===
The election took place on 7 May 1998.

=== 1994 election ===
The election took place on 5 May 1994.

=== 1990 election ===
The election took place on 3 May 1990.

=== 1986 election ===
The election took place on 8 May 1986.

=== 1982 election ===
The election took place on 6 May 1982.

=== 1978 election ===
The election took place on 4 May 1978.
