= 2002 Bexley London Borough Council election =

Local government election in England

2002 Bexley Council election
← 1998	2 May 2002	2006 →

All 63 seats to Bexley London Borough Council 32 seats needed for a majority
	First party	Second party	Third party
Party	Labour	Conservative	Liberal Democrats
Seats won	32	30	1
Seat change	▲8	▼3	▼5
Popular vote	19,593	24,739	8,929
Percentage	33.0%	41.6%	15.0%
- Map of the results of the 2002 Bexley council election. Labour in red, Conservatives in blue and Liberal Democrats in orange.
Council control before election
Conservative
Council control after election
Labour

The 2002 Bexley Council election took place on 2 May 2002 to elect members of Bexley London Borough Council in London, England. The whole council was up for election and the Labour Party gained control of the council from the Conservative Party.

== Election result ==
Bexley local election result 2002
Party	Seats	Gains	Losses	Net gain/loss	Seats %	Votes %	Votes	+/−
Labour	32	8	0	▲8	50.8	33.0	19,593	
Conservative	30	0	3	▼3	47.6	41.6	24,739	
Liberal Democrats	1	0	5	▼5	1.6	15.0	8,929	
UKIP	0	0	0	0	0.0	5.4	3,193	
Independent	0	0	0	0	0.0	2.3	1,382	
BNP	0	0	0	0	0.0	2.0	1,203	
Green	0	0	0	0	0.0	0.6	365	New
English Pan-Nationalist Alliance	0	0	0	0	0.0	0.1	38	New

== Ward results ==
=== Barnehurst ===
Barnehurst (3)
Party	Candidate	Votes	%	±%
Conservative	Richard Gillespie	1,583	50.5	
Conservative	William McEwen	1,512		
Conservative	Simon Windle	1,463		
Labour	Matthew Murphy	910	29.0	
Labour	Edward Leake	870		
Labour	Carol Pieri	843		
Liberal Democrats	Kaye Cudmore	391	12.5	
Liberal Democrats	John Cudmore	358		
Liberal Democrats	Paul Humphris	348		
UKIP	Barrie Thomas	249	7.9	
Turnout			37.2	
Conservative hold		Swing		
Conservative hold		Swing		
Conservative win (new seat)				

=== Belvedere ===
Belvedere (3)
Party	Candidate	Votes	%	±%
Labour	Daniel Francis	1,228	55.4	
Labour	Richard Lucas	1,180		
Labour	Peter Hollamby	1,171		
Conservative	John Mankerty	767	34.6	
Conservative	Juliet Mankerty	716		
Conservative	Gooroodev Nangon	599		
UKIP	Paula Dunford	222	10.0	
Turnout			27.5	
Labour hold		Swing		
Labour hold		Swing		
Labour hold		Swing		

=== Blackfen and Lamorbey ===
Blackfen and Lamorbey (3)
Party	Candidate	Votes	%	±%
Conservative	Brian Beckwith	1,337	44.7	
Conservative	Katherine Perrior	1,291		
Conservative	Peter Craske	1,220		
Liberal Democrats	Terry Brown	928	31.0	
Liberal Democrats	Scott Gallego	886		
Liberal Democrats	Peter Scopes	874		
Labour	Paul Brown	526	17.6	
Labour	Bernard Justham	481		
Labour	Josephine Chodha	472		
UKIP	Heather Bennett	200	6.7	
Turnout			36.2	
Conservative win (new seat)				
Conservative win (new seat)				
Conservative win (new seat)				

=== Blendon and Penhill ===
Blendon and Penhill (3)
Party	Candidate	Votes	%	±%
Conservative	Margaret Cammish	1,555	58.3	
Conservative	Ronald Passey	1,534		
Conservative	Graham D'Amiral	1,490		
Labour	Catherine Deadman	531	19.9	
Labour	David Prior	520		
Labour	Gerda Slater	490		
Liberal Democrats	Mary Cooke	346	13.0	
Liberal Democrats	Peggy Wagstaff	334		
Liberal Democrats	Michael Jaques	315		
UKIP	Deborah Thomas	179	6.7	
Independent	Philip Brown	57	2.1	
Turnout			32.0	
Conservative hold		Swing		
Conservative hold		Swing		
Conservative hold		Swing		

=== Brampton ===
Brampton (3)
Party	Candidate	Votes	%	±%
Conservative	Ronald French	2,039	56.5	
Conservative	Teresa O'Neill	1,983		
Conservative	John Wilkinson	1,885		
Labour	Joan Browning	950	26.3	
Labour	Alan Scutt	888		
Labour	Rowan Blake	887		
Liberal Democrats	Janette Codd	453	12.6	
Liberal Democrats	Janet Standen	437		
Liberal Democrats	Philip Codd	423		
UKIP	George Wright	167	4.6	
Turnout			43.3	
Conservative hold		Swing		
Conservative hold		Swing		
Conservative hold		Swing		

=== Christchurch ===
Christchurch (3)
Party	Candidate	Votes	%	±%
Conservative	Roy Ashmole	1,529	56.5	
Conservative	Ian Clement	1,455		
Conservative	Leonard Newton	1,427		
Labour	Ursula Ayliffe	834	26.6	
Labour	Wendy Philips	785		
Labour	Lindsay Burnstead	784		
Liberal Democrats	John Brand	401	12.8	
Liberal Democrats	Betty Lockington	378		
Liberal Democrats	Maria O'Hare	318		
Independent	Stanley Carter	262	8.4	
UKIP	Lisa Hawkins	110	3.5	
Turnout			35.8	
Conservative hold		Swing		
Conservative hold		Swing		
Conservative hold		Swing		

=== Colyers ===
Colyers (3)
Party	Candidate	Votes	%	±%
Labour	Ronald Browning	1,127	46.5	
Labour	Denis Daniels	1,036		
Labour	Joga Minhas	1,005		
Conservative	John Bowes	952	39.3	
Conservative	Joseph Pollard	908		
Conservative	Gerald Quieros	857		
BNP	Lawrence Rustem	184	7.6	
UKIP	Bernard Rainsbury	160	6.6	
Turnout			29.0	
Labour win (new seat)				
Labour win (new seat)				
Labour win (new seat)				

=== Cray Meadows ===
Cray Meadows (3)
Party	Candidate	Votes	%	±%
Labour	Joel Briant	1,539	44.6	
Labour	Richard Justham	1,524		
Labour	Mo Khalid	1,465		
Conservative	Leonard Barnes	1,346	39.0	
Conservative	Hugh McBride	1,307		
Conservative	Janice McBride	1,287		
Liberal Democrats	Robin Kelly	265	7.7	
Liberal Democrats	Doreen La Roche	237		
Liberal Democrats	John La Roche	221		
Green	Paul Perrin	168	4.9	
UKIP	Laurence Williams	129	3.7	
Turnout			40.5	
Labour win (new seat)				
Labour win (new seat)				
Labour win (new seat)				

=== Crayford ===
Crayford (3)
Party	Candidate	Votes	%	±%
Labour	John Shepheard	1,132	49.3	
Labour	Tonya Kelsey	1,078		
Labour	Trevor Perrin	1,024		
Conservative	Robert Stead	828	36.0	
Conservative	Daisy Clement	808		
Conservative	Bernard Clewes	801		
BNP	John Bowles	173	7.5	
UKIP	Kevin Cronin	164	7.1	
Turnout			29.4	
Labour hold		Swing		
Labour hold		Swing		
Labour hold		Swing		

=== Danson Park ===
Danson Park (3)
Party	Candidate	Votes	%	±%
Conservative	Linda Bailey	1,320	46.2	
Conservative	Sharon Massey	1,237		
Conservative	John Waters	1,222		
Liberal Democrats	Carol Smoker	963	33.7	
Liberal Democrats	Paul Hurren	940		
Liberal Democrats	Paul Bargery	927		
Labour	Fiona Lawrenson	572	20.0	
Labour	Stuart Slater	531		
Labour	Robert Vines	519		
Turnout			35.7	
Conservative gain from Liberal Democrats		Swing		
Conservative gain from Liberal Democrats		Swing		
Conservative gain from Liberal Democrats		Swing		

=== East Wickham ===
East Wickham (3)
Party	Candidate	Votes	%	±%
Liberal Democrats	Nicholas O'Hare	1,059	35.9	
Labour	John Lawrenson	1,020	34.6	
Labour	Richard Everitt	961		
Labour	Stefano Borella	945		
Liberal Democrats	Anthony Pickett	938		
Liberal Democrats	Colin Wright	923		
Conservative	Hazel Birch	733	24.9	
Conservative	Michael Crouch	720		
Conservative	William Flint	682		
UKIP	Kim Mitchell	136	4.6	
Turnout			35.2	
Liberal Democrats hold		Swing		
Labour hold		Swing		
Labour gain from Liberal Democrats		Swing		

=== Erith ===
Erith (3)
Party	Candidate	Votes	%	±%
Labour	Christopher Ball	1,057	54.8	
Labour	Margaret O'Neill	982		
Labour	Munir Malik	898		
Conservative	Bernard Gillespie	616	31.9	
Conservative	Rosemary White	614		
Conservative	Carol Wilkinson	608		
BNP	Claire Sayers	144	7.5	
UKIP	Edward Llewellyn	112	5.8	
Turnout			25.3	
Labour hold		Swing		
Labour hold		Swing		
Labour hold		Swing		

=== Falconwood and Welling ===
Falconwood and Welling (3)
Party	Candidate	Votes	%	±%
Conservative	Nigel Betts	1,379	44.4	
Conservative	Peter Catterall	1,244		
Conservative	Valerie Clark	1,219		
Liberal Democrats	Edward Shrimpton	1,608	34.4	
Liberal Democrats	Barry Standen	1,061		
Liberal Democrats	Sylvia Fortune	1,051		
Labour	Stephen Perfect	512	16.5	
Labour	Corinna Huxley	463		
Labour	Nora Wright	462		
UKIP	Bertram Ford	149	4.8	
Turnout			37.8	
Conservative win (new seat)				
Conservative win (new seat)				
Conservative win (new seat)				

=== Lesnes Abbey ===
Lesnes Abbey (3)
Party	Candidate	Votes	%	±%
Labour	Ronald Brown	1,451	44.8	
Labour	Samuel Blake	1,410		
Labour	John Pegg	1,381		
Conservative	John Davey	1,360	41.9	
Conservative	Raymond Hudson	1,336		
Conservative	David Hurt	1,324		
Liberal Democrats	David Hall	324	10.0	
Liberal Democrats	Maureen Hall	308		
Liberal Democrats	Daniel Woracker	275		
UKIP	Susan Dulwich	107	3.3	
Turnout			39.3	
Labour win (new seat)				
Labour win (new seat)				
Labour win (new seat)				

=== Longlands ===
Longlands (3)
Party	Candidate	Votes	%	±%
Conservative	Kenneth McAndrew	1,490	51.1	
Conservative	Gareth Bacon	1,473		
Conservative	Michael Slaughter	1,385		
Labour	Patricia Ball	633	21.7	
Labour	Teresa Pearce	601		
Labour	Peter West	577		
Liberal Democrats	Angela Thick	577	19.8	
Liberal Democrats	Margaret Shrimpton	431		
Liberal Democrats	Brian Oliver	410		
UKIP	Paul Cronin	217	7.4	
Turnout			34.0	
Conservative win (new seat)				
Conservative win (new seat)				
Conservative win (new seat)				

=== North End ===
North End (3)
Party	Candidate	Votes	%	±%
Labour	John Eastaugh	1,401	55.7	
Labour	Alan Deadman	1,341		
Labour	Sylvia Malt	1,298		
BNP	Colin Smith	541	21.5	
BNP	James Seadon	502		
BNP	Jay Lee	501		
Conservative	Philip Read	452	18.0	
Conservative	Sylvia Cassells	444		
Conservative	Peter Reader	407		
UKIP	David Tarrant	82	3.3	
English Pan-Nationalist Alliance	John-Antony Fitzpatrick	38	1.5	
Turnout			33.4	
Labour hold		Swing		
Labour hold		Swing		
Labour hold		Swing		

=== Northumberland Heath ===
Northumberland Heath (3)
Party	Candidate	Votes	%	±%
Labour	Geoffrey Hacker	1,178	40.8	
Labour	Mary Lucas	1,161		
Labour	Kathryn Smith	1,102		
Conservative	John Allott	1,041	36.1	
Conservative	David Cammish	969		
Conservative	Terence Horlor	950		
Liberal Democrats	Peter Smith	333	11.5	
Liberal Democrats	Dennis Smoker	246		
Liberal Democrats	Peter Weston	236		
UKIP	John Dunford	172	6.0	
BNP	Lee Barnes	161	5.6	
Turnout			34.5	
Labour hold		Swing		
Labour hold		Swing		
Labour hold		Swing		

=== St Mary's ===
St Mary's (3)
Party	Candidate	Votes	%	±%
Conservative	Colin Campbell	1,974	61.2	
Conservative	Alan Downing	1,946		
Conservative	Colin Tandy	1,914		
Labour	Broderick Bassett	609	18.9	
Labour	David Hinds	583		
Labour	Philip Scrivener	559		
Liberal Democrats	Duncan Borrowman	310	9.6	
Liberal Democrats	David Nicolle	300		
Liberal Democrats	Ruth Tatton-Kelly	278		
Green	David Harbud	197	6.1	
UKIP	Christopher Marshall	138	4.3	
Turnout			37.8	
Conservative hold		Swing		
Conservative hold		Swing		
Conservative hold		Swing		

=== St Michael's ===
St Michael's (3)
Party	Candidate	Votes	%	±%
Labour	Elizabeth French	1,023	35.6	
Labour	Grant Blowers	981		
Labour	Wendy Perfect	972		
Conservative	Peter Baylis	887	30.9	
Liberal Democrats	Justine Fernandes	831	28.9	
Conservative	John Warricker	775		
Conservative	Raymond Sams	766		
Liberal Democrats	Lynne McGlashen	760		
Liberal Democrats	Stanley Vince	752		
UKIP	William Jenner	134	4.7	
Turnout			35.1	
Labour hold		Swing		
Labour hold		Swing		
Labour gain from Liberal Democrats		Swing		

=== Sidcup ===
Sidcup (3)
Party	Candidate	Votes	%	±%
Conservative	Aileen Beckwith	1,247	34.5	
Conservative	Brian Francois	1,117		
Conservative	June Slaughter	1,093		
Independent	Graham Holland	1,063	29.4	
Independent	Robert Griffiths	768		
Labour	Colin Dawes	550	15.2	
Labour	Garth Pilling-Lindsell	501		
Labour	John Shaw	463		
Liberal Democrats	Gillian Eady	385	10.7	
Liberal Democrats	Christopher Eady	376		
UKIP	Janice Cronin	366	10.1	
Liberal Democrats	William Shrimpton	282		
Turnout			35.8	
Conservative win (new seat)				
Conservative win (new seat)				
Conservative win (new seat)				

=== Thamesmead East ===
Thamesmead East (3)
Party	Candidate	Votes	%	±%
Labour	Donna Briant	810	57.5	
Labour	Michael French	714		
Labour	Harbans Buttar	712		
Conservative	Edgar Silvester	304	21.6	
Conservative	Shirley Vick	296		
Liberal Democrats	Jeremy Cotton	295	20.9	
Liberal Democrats	Carol Folan	266		
Conservative	Priti Patel	259		
Liberal Democrats	John Wylie	251		
Turnout			18.3	
Labour hold		Swing		
Labour hold		Swing		
Labour hold		Swing		
