= 2010 Bexley London Borough Council election =

2010 local election in England

2010 Bexley Borough Council election
← 2006	6 May 2010	2014 →

All 63 seats to Bexley London Borough Council 32 seats needed for a majority

	First party	Second party
Party	Conservative	Labour
Last election	54 seats, 50.0%	9 seats, 24.7%
Seats won	52	11
Seat change	▼2	▲2
Popular vote	56,042	31,747
Percentage	43.2%	24.5%
Swing	▼6.8%	▼0.2%
- Map of the results of the 2010 Bexley council election. Conservatives in blue and Labour in red.
Council control before election
Conservative
Council control after election
Conservative

Elections for Bexley Borough Council in London, England were held on 6 May 2010. The 2010 General Election and other local elections took place on the same day.

In London council elections the entire council is elected every four years, opposed to some local elections where one councillor is elected every year for three of the four years.

== Results ==
Bexley Council election result 2010
Party	Seats	Gains	Losses	Net gain/loss	Seats %	Votes %	Votes	+/−
Conservative	52	0	2	▼2	82.5	43.2	56,042	▼6.8
Labour	11	2	0	▲2	17.5	24.5	31,747	▼0.2
Liberal Democrats	0	0	0	Steady	0.0	13.4	17,389	▲1.8
BNP	0	0	0	Steady	0.0	10.6	13,796	▲6.8
English Democrat	0	0	0	Steady	0.0	4.5	5,855	New
UKIP	0	0	0	Steady	0.0	2.0	2,552	▼0.7
Green	0	0	0	Steady	0.0	0.8	1,068	New
Independent	0	0	0	Steady	0.0	0.6	754	▼4.5
CPA	0	0	0	Steady	0.0	0.3	380	New

== Ward results ==
=== Barnehurst ===
Barnehurst (3)
Party	Candidate	Votes	%	±%
Conservative	Howard Marriner	2,806	41.6	
Conservative	David Hurt	2,792		
Conservative	Simon Windle	2,594		
Labour	Joanne Browning	1,271	18.8	
Labour	Linda Husband	989		
Labour	Peter Kilner	930		
Liberal Democrats	Janette Codd	908	13.5	
Liberal Democrats	Margaret Shrimpton	729		
UKIP	Barrie Thomas	672	10.0	
BNP	Gary Howells	641	9.5	
English Democrat	Sandra Rogers	450	6.7	
Turnout			61.0	
Conservative hold		Swing		
Conservative hold		Swing		
Conservative hold		Swing		

=== Belvedere ===
Belvedere (3)
Party	Candidate	Votes	%	±%
Labour	Gillian MacDonald	2,362	42.1	
Labour	Sean Newman	2,058		
Conservative	Kerry Allon	2,011	35.9	
Conservative	Mick Singh	1,972		
Conservative	David Leaf	1,963		
Labour	John Slater	1,857		
BNP	Neil Allen	671	12.0	
English Democrat	Sean Varnham	562	10.0	
Turnout			52.0	
Labour gain from Conservative		Swing		
Labour hold		Swing		
Conservative hold		Swing		

=== Blackfen and Lamorbey ===
Blackfen and Lamorbey (3)
Party	Candidate	Votes	%	±%
Conservative	Brian Beckwith	3,077	47.9	
Conservative	Peter Craske	2,841		
Conservative	Katie Perrior	2,721		
Labour	Manny Blake	1,110	17.3	
Labour	Carole Borella	1,027		
Liberal Democrats	Scott Gallego	927	14.4	
Labour	Gerda Slater	848		
Liberal Democrats	David Hayter	777		
BNP	Maureen Slaughter	693	10.8	
English Democrat	Dan Eastgate	615	9.6	
Turnout			60.0	
Conservative hold		Swing		
Conservative hold		Swing		
Conservative hold		Swing		

=== Blendon and Penhill ===
Blendon and Penhill (3)
Party	Candidate	Votes	%	±%
Conservative	Pat Cammish	3,756	51.3	
Conservative	Graham d'Amiral	3,250		
Conservative	Nick O'Hare	3,209		
Labour	Donna Briant	1,255	17.1	
Labour	Sarah Reeve	1,096		
Labour	David Prior	984		
Liberal Democrats	Peter Scopes	953	13.0	
BNP	Linda Osborne	711	9.7	
English Democrat	Elaine Cheeseman	645	8.8	
Turnout			63.0	
Conservative hold		Swing		
Conservative hold		Swing		
Conservative hold		Swing		

=== Brampton ===
Brampton (3)
Party	Candidate	Votes	%	±%
Conservative	Sybil Camsey	3,474	46.9	
Conservative	Teresa O'Neill	3,380		
Conservative	John Wilkinson	2,851		
Labour	Ron Brown	1,575	21.3	
Labour	Alan Scutt	1,207		
Labour	Matthew Murphy	1,159		
Liberal Democrats	Daniel Novitt	1,051	14.2	
UKIP	John Dunford	708	9.6	
BNP	Peter James	595	8.0	
Turnout			63.0	
Conservative hold		Swing		
Conservative hold		Swing		
Conservative hold		Swing		

=== Christchurch ===
Christchurch (3)
Party	Candidate	Votes	%	±%
Conservative	Brad Smith	2,799	46.4	
Conservative	James Spencer	2,716		
Conservative	Roy Ashmole	2,674		
Liberal Democrats	Beverly Bassom	1,463	24.2	
Liberal Democrats	John Brooks	1,251		
Liberal Democrats	Jack Stephens	1,250		
Labour	John Holbrook	1,138	18.9	
Labour	Michael O'Neill	1,043		
Labour	Pauline Turner	980		
BNP	Gordon Davis	637	10.6	
Turnout			63.0	
Conservative hold		Swing		
Conservative hold		Swing		
Conservative hold		Swing		

=== Colyers ===
Colyers (3)
Party	Candidate	Votes	%	±%
Conservative	Brian Bishop	2,006	37.3	
Conservative	Maxine Fothergill	2,003		
Conservative	Chris Taylor	1,925		
Labour	Tom Page	1,574	29.2	
Labour	Baljeet Singh Gill	1,549		
Labour	Tosin Okuyele	1,446		
Liberal Democrats	Barry Standen	734	13.6	
Liberal Democrats	Alex MacDonald	697		
BNP	Peter Hacking	666	12.4	
Liberal Democrats	Jawharah Albakri	596		
English Democrat	Mike Tibby	403	7.5	
Turnout			56.0	
Conservative hold		Swing		
Conservative hold		Swing		
Conservative hold		Swing		

=== Cray Meadows ===
Cray Meadows (3)
Party	Candidate	Votes	%	±%
Conservative	Cheryl Bacon	2,727	46.6	
Conservative	Ross Downing	2,306		
Conservative	Don Massey	2,240		
Labour	Sylvia Malt	1,072	18.3	
Liberal Democrats	Duncan Borrowman	1,001	17.1	
Labour	Peter West	946		
Liberal Democrats	Dawn Berry	897		
Liberal Democrats	Matthew Casey	854		
Labour	Husaini Yakubu	831		
BNP	John Brooks	583	10.0	
English Democrat	Laurence Williams	473	8.1	
Turnout			55.0	
Conservative hold		Swing		
Conservative hold		Swing		
Conservative hold		Swing		

=== Crayford ===
Crayford (3)
Party	Candidate	Votes	%	±%
Conservative	Geraldene Lucia-Hennis	2,355	37.6	
Conservative	Melvin Seymour	2,220		
Conservative	Eileen Pallen	2,069		
Labour	Tonya Kelsey	1,599	25.5	
Labour	John Shepheard	1,560		
Labour	Trevor Perrin	1,418		
Liberal Democrats	Andrew Fowler	1,040	16.6	
BNP	Stephen James	710	11.3	
English Democrat	Maggi Young	562	9.0	
Turnout			54.0	
Conservative hold		Swing		
Conservative hold		Swing		
Conservative hold		Swing		

=== Danson Park ===
Danson Park (3)
Party	Candidate	Votes	%	±%
Conservative	Linda Bailey	3,029	47.5	
Conservative	Sharon Massey	2,708		
Conservative	John Waters	2,568		
Labour	Cathy Deadman	1,091	17.1	
Liberal Democrats	Laura Bradnam	1,034	16.2	
Labour	Julia Matton	976		
Labour	Jim Leake	952		
Liberal Democrats	Anthony Pickett	886		
Liberal Democrats	Edward Shrimpton	784		
UKIP	Malcolm Clarke	625	9.8	
BNP	Allyson Davis	595	9.3	
Turnout			61.0	
Conservative hold		Swing		
Conservative hold		Swing		
Conservative hold		Swing		

=== East Wickham ===
East Wickham (3)
Party	Candidate	Votes	%	±%
Conservative	Steven Hall	2,252	39.6	
Conservative	Michael Tarrant	2,090		
Conservative	James Hunt	2,034		
Labour	Rick Everitt	1,320	23.2	
BNP	Michael Barnbrook	1,282	22.5	
Labour	Daisy Harper	1,224		
Labour	Jo Choda	1,178		
BNP	Linda Hacking	1,066		
BNP	Stephen Hadley	1,006		
Liberal Democrats	Charles Amis	840	14.8	
Liberal Democrats	John Cudmore	640		
Liberal Democrats	Kaye Cudmore	612		
Turnout			63.0	
Conservative hold		Swing		
Conservative hold		Swing		
Conservative hold		Swing		

=== Erith ===
Erith (3)
Party	Candidate	Votes	%	±%
Labour	Chris Ball	2,220	40.1	
Labour	Edward Boateng	2,065		
Labour	Margaret O'Neill	2,032		
Conservative	John Ault	1,829	33.0	
Conservative	Bernard Clewes	1,768		
Conservative	Amandeep Singh Bhogal	1,660		
Liberal Democrats	Florence Jamieson	923	16.7	
BNP	Lee Woodthorpe	567	10.2	
Turnout			51.0	
Labour hold		Swing		
Labour hold		Swing		
Labour gain from Conservative		Swing		

=== Falconwood and Welling ===
Falconwood and Welling (3)
Party	Candidate	Votes	%	±%
Conservative	Nigel Betts	2,977	46.5	
Conservative	Peter Catterall	2,634		
Conservative	Val Clark	2,467		
Labour	Steve Perfect	1,274	19.9	
Labour	Mavis Persaud	1,118		
Labour	Stuart Slater	1,082		
Liberal Democrats	Zoe Brooks	938	14.6	
Liberal Democrats	William Shrimpton	721		
BNP	Michael Jones	670	10.5	
BNP	Jaymie McCoy	628		
Liberal Democrats	Angela Thick	594		
UKIP	Pamela Perrin	547	8.5	
BNP	Josephine Ridout	403		
Turnout			65.0	
Conservative hold		Swing		
Conservative hold		Swing		
Conservative hold		Swing		

=== Lesnes Abbey ===
Lesnes Abbey (3)
Party	Candidate	Votes	%	±%
Conservative	John Davey	2,550	41.3	
Conservative	John Fuller	2,400		
Conservative	Eleanor Hurt	2,267		
Labour	John Browning	2,261	36.6	
Labour	John Husband	2,153		
Labour	Grant Blowers	2,083		
BNP	Nicola Finch	716	11.6	
English Democrat	Peter Townsend	644	10.4	
Turnout			58.0	
Conservative hold		Swing		
Conservative hold		Swing		
Conservative hold		Swing		

=== Longlands ===
Longlands (3)
Party	Candidate	Votes	%	±%
Conservative	Gareth Bacon	3,106	56.2	
Conservative	Richard Gillespie	2,664		
Conservative	Michael Slaughter	2,332		
Liberal Democrats	Michael Jaques	1,059	19.2	
Liberal Democrats	Oliver Brooks	962		
Liberal Democrats	Paul Hurren	921		
Labour	Bryan Moran	901	16.3	
Labour	Michael McCartney	874		
Labour	Gareth Pilling-Lindsell	748		
BNP	David Bowman	458	8.3	
Turnout			63.0	
Conservative hold		Swing		
Conservative hold		Swing		
Conservative hold		Swing		

=== North End ===
North End (3)
Party	Candidate	Votes	%	±%
Labour	Brenda Langstead	2,039	42.5	
Labour	Stef Borella	2,007		
Labour	Alan Deadman	1,917		
Conservative	Chris Bishop	1,454	30.3	
Conservative	Christopher Tugwell	1,330		
Conservative	Andy Dourmoush	1,211		
Liberal Democrats	Heidi Barnes	685	14.3	
Liberal Democrats	Philip Codd	654		
BNP	Thomas Andrews	622	13.0	
BNP	Ivan Osbourne	533		
Turnout			53.0	
Labour hold		Swing		
Labour hold		Swing		
Labour hold		Swing		

=== Northumberland Heath ===
Northumberland Heath (3)
Party	Candidate	Votes	%	±%
Conservative	Philip Read	2,836	43.7	
Conservative	Peter Reader	2,758		
Conservative	Alex Sawyer	2,414		
Labour	Daniel Francis	1,577	24.3	
Labour	Geoffrey Hacker	1,550		
Labour	Janet White	1,366		
Liberal Democrats	Paul Bargery	995	15.3	
BNP	Robert Howard	639	9.8	
English Democrat	Steve Uncles	449	6.9	
Turnout			61.0	
Conservative hold		Swing		
Conservative hold		Swing		
Conservative hold		Swing		

=== St Mary's ===
St Mary's (3)
Party	Candidate	Votes	%	±%
Conservative	Colin Campbell	3,756	57.8	
Conservative	Alan Downing	3,264		
Conservative	Colin Tandy	3,106		
Labour	Dave Hinds	955	14.7	
Liberal Democrats	Shule Basaran	888	13.7	
Liberal Democrats	David Nicolle	857		
Liberal Democrats	Angela Nurse	845		
Labour	Judith Jackson	822		
Labour	Philip Scrivener	793		
BNP	Bernard Cresswell	508	7.8	
Green	Stuart Carter	396	6.1	
Turnout			65.0	
Conservative hold		Swing		
Conservative hold		Swing		
Conservative hold		Swing		

=== St Michael's ===
St Michael's (3)
Party	Candidate	Votes	%	±%
Conservative	Caroline Newton	2,692	41.4	
Conservative	Joseph Pollard	2,623		
Conservative	Ray Sams	2,298		
Labour	Pat Ball	1,554	23.9	
Labour	Wendy Perfect	1,392		
Labour	Derek Steedman	1,269		
Liberal Democrats	David Hall	884	13.6	
BNP	Chloe Nichols	813	12.5	
Liberal Democrats	Lesley Morpurgo	724		
Liberal Democrats	Maurice Morpurgo	615		
English Democrat	Barbara Eastgate	562	8.6	
Turnout			64.0	
Conservative hold		Swing		
Conservative hold		Swing		
Conservative hold		Swing		

=== Sidcup ===
Sidcup (3)
Party	Candidate	Votes	%	±%
Conservative	Aileen Beckwith	3,355	47.1	
Conservative	Jackie Evans	3,186		
Conservative	June Slaughter	2,980		
Labour	Bob Bedwell	1,071	15.0	
Liberal Democrats	Betty Lockington	1,066	15.0	
Liberal Democrats	David Sexton	1,052		
Labour	Ray Hutchins	973		
Labour	Bernard Justham	864		
Green	Jonathon Rooks	672	9.4	
English Democrat	Jon Cheeseman	490	6.9	
BNP	Laurence Picton	466	6.5	
Turnout			63.0	
Conservative hold		Swing		
Conservative hold		Swing		
Conservative hold		Swing		

=== Thamesmead East ===
Thamesmead East (3)
Party	Candidate	Votes	%	±%
Labour	Sandra Bauer	2,528	46.7	
Labour	Munir Malik	2,067		
Labour	Harry Persaud	2,058		
Conservative	Tessa Craig	1,195	22.1	
Conservative	Michael Alldis	1,119		
Conservative	Dee Patel	1,026		
Independent	Tinuola Adeyemi	754	13.9	
BNP	Ben Scott	553	10.2	
CPA	Anthony Olusuyi	380	7.0	
CPA	Emeka Nwagbara	223		
CPA	Fabian Karawusa	199		
Turnout			46.0	
Labour hold		Swing		
Labour hold		Swing		
Labour hold		Swing		
