= 2018 Bexley London Borough Council election =

2018 local election in England

2018 Bexley Borough Council election
- 3 May 2018

All 45 seats to Bexley London Borough Council 23 seats needed for a majority

	First party	Second party
Party	Conservative	Labour
Last election	45 seats, 38.1%	15 seats, 25.7%
Seats before	35^{†}	10^{†}
Seats won	34	11
Seat change	▼1*	▲1*
Popular vote	35,207	23,564
Percentage	50.4%	33.7%
Swing	▲12.3%	▲8.0%
- Map of the results of the 2018 Bexley council election. Conservatives in blue, and Labour in red.
Council control before election
Conservative
Council control after election
Conservative

The 2018 Bexley Council election took place on 3 May 2018 to elect members of Bexley London Borough Council in England. This was on the same day as other local elections.

There were boundary changes which reduced the number of wards from 21 to 17 and the number of councillors from 63 to 45.

== Overall results ==
The Conservatives retained control of the council, winning 34 of the new seats. Labour won 11 and UKIP won no seats.

Bexley local election result 2018
Party	Seats	Gains	Losses	Net gain/loss	Seats %	Votes %	Votes	+/−
Conservative	34	0	1	-1^{†}	75.6	50.4	35,207	+12.3
Labour	11	1	0	+1^{†}	24.4	33.7	23,564	+8.0
Liberal Democrats	0	0	0	0	0.0	5.7	3,977	+3.0
UKIP	0	0	0	0	0.0	5.6	3,888	-16.9
Green	0	0	0	0	0.0	1.7	1,159	+0.2
Independent	0	0	0	0	0.0	1.2	809	+0.1
Others	0	0	0	0	0.0	1.9	1,295	-6.3

^{†}Notional changes calculated by the BBC.

== Ward results ==
=== Barnehurst ===
Barnehurst (2)
Party	Candidate	Votes	%	±%
Conservative	Brian Bishop	1,833	56.8	
Conservative	Howard Jackson	1,751	54.3	
Labour	Alexis Chase	1,060	32.9	
Labour	Ali Ali	1,033	32.0	
UKIP	Harry Buttar	282	8.7	
UKIP	Mike Ferro	280	8.7	
Turnout		3,262	38.8	
Conservative hold		Swing		
Conservative hold		Swing		

Barnehurst became a 2 member ward in 2018, following the cutdown on councilors from 63 to 45. Brian Bishop became Mayor of Bexley after this election.

=== Belvedere ===
Belvedere (3)
Party	Candidate	Votes	%	±%
Labour	Sally Hinkley	2,403	61.3	
Labour	Daniel Francis	2,353	60.1	
Labour	Dave Putson	2,307	58.9	
Conservative	Graham Moon	1,457	37.2	
Conservative	Frazer Brooks	1,429	36.5	
Conservative	Natalie Price	1,330	34.0	
Turnout		3,980	34.0	
Labour hold		Swing		
Labour hold		Swing		
Labour hold		Swing		

Leader of the Opposition in Bexley, Daniel Francis, stood here.

=== Bexleyheath ===
Bexleyheath (3)
Party	Candidate	Votes	%	±%
Conservative	Sue Gower	2,806	60.5	
Conservative	Eileen Pallen	2,770	59.7	
Conservative	Brad Smith	2,765	59.6	
Labour	Liam Davies	1,280	27.6	
Labour	Pauline Turner	1,223	26.4	
Labour	Keri Hacker	1,126	24.3	
Liberal Democrats	David Hall	413	8.9	
UKIP	John Dunford	361	7.8	
UKIP	Paula Dunford	325	7.0	
Turnout		4,663	39.5	
Conservative win (new seat)				
Conservative win (new seat)				
Conservative win (new seat)				

=== Blackfen & Lamorbey ===
Blackfen & Lamorbey (3)
Party	Candidate	Votes	%	±%
Conservative	Peter Craske	2,688	57.7	
Conservative	James Hunt	2,686	57.7	
Conservative	Cafer Munur	2,110	45.3	
Labour	Daniel Jenkins	1,179	25.3	
Labour	Kathy Steedman	1,100	23.6	
Labour	Rob Parish	1,011	21.7	
Independent	Becci McManus	809	17.4	
UKIP	Lynn Smith	611	13.1	
Liberal Democrats	Lewis Ilsley	530	11.4	
Turnout		4,687	38.7	
Conservative hold		Swing		
Conservative hold		Swing		
Conservative gain from UKIP		Swing		

=== Blendon & Penhill ===
Blendon & Penhill (3)
Party	Candidate	Votes	%	±%
Conservative	Adam Wildman	2,835	64.6	
Conservative	Nick O'Hare	2,759	62.8	
Conservative	David Leaf	2,683	61.1	
Labour	Pat Ball	1,098	25.0	
Labour	Chris Mace	978	22.3	
Labour	Brian Silk	917	20.9	
UKIP	Linda Harris	497	11.3	
Liberal Democrats	Jawharah Albakri	334	7.6	
Turnout		4,419	37.7	
Conservative hold		Swing		
Conservative hold		Swing		
Conservative hold		Swing		

=== Crayford ===
Crayford (3)
Party	Candidate	Votes	%	±%
Conservative	Melvin Seymour	1,958	50.5	
Conservative	Geraldine Lucia-Hennis	1,918	49.4	
Conservative	Christine Bishop	1,896	48.9	
Labour	Anna Day	1,489	38.4	
Labour	Elizabeth Folarin	1,270	32.7	
Labour	Munir Malik	1,254	32.3	
UKIP	Keith Forster	460	11.9	
Liberal Democrats	Sean Ash	375	9.7	
Turnout		3,902	35.1	
Conservative hold		Swing		
Conservative hold		Swing		
Conservative hold		Swing		

=== Crook Log ===
Crook Log (3)
Party	Candidate	Votes	%	±%
Conservative	Linda Bailey	2,922	61.5	
Conservative	Teresa O'Neill	2,843	59.8	
Conservative	Sybil Camsey	2,785	58.6	
Labour	Janet Mary Mace	1,482	31.2	
Labour	Shekhar Vyas	1,458	30.7	
Labour	Andy Smith	1,430	30.1	
Liberal Democrats	Gem Ahmet	440	9.3	
Turnout		4,804	40.9	
Conservative win (new seat)				
Conservative win (new seat)				
Conservative win (new seat)				

Leader of the Council, Teresa O'Neill, stood here, following the abolition of her previous ward; Brampton

=== East Wickham ===
East Wickham (3)
Party	Candidate	Votes	%	±%
Conservative	Steven Hall	2,473	55.3	
Conservative	Caroline Newton	2,341	52.3	
Conservative	Christine Catterall	2,308	51.6	
Labour	Sam Marchant	1,727	38.6	
Labour	Anthony Riches	1,558	34.8	
Labour	Victoria Ankintomide	1,536	34.3	
BNP	Michael Jones	398	8.9	
Turnout		4,523	38.4	
Conservative hold		Swing		
Conservative hold		Swing		
Conservative hold		Swing		

=== Erith ===
Erith (2)
Party	Candidate	Votes	%	±%
Labour	Joe Ferreira	1,463	63.1	
Labour	Nicola Taylor	1,447	62.4	
Conservative	Irene Reader	747	32.2	
Conservative	Eliot Smith	697	30.1	
BNP	Pamela Mackie	154	6.6	
Turnout		2,349	32.4	
Labour hold		Swing		
Labour hold		Swing		

Erith became a 2 member ward, following the cutdown of councillors from 63 to 45.

=== Falconwood & Welling ===
Falconwood & Welling (3)
Party	Candidate	Votes	%	±%
Conservative	Nigel Betts	2,641	56.5	
Conservative	Val Clark	2,470	52.9	
Conservative	Louie French	2,317	49.6	
Labour	David Lovelace	1,437	30.8	
Labour	Matthew Murphy	1,326	28.4	
Labour	Murali Surendran	1,302	27.9	
UKIP	Malcolm Clarke	426	9.1	
Green	Elisabeth Radbon	420	9.0	
UKIP	Frank Gould	328	7.0	
UKIP	Pamela Perrin	292	6.2	
Liberal Democrats	Robin Kelly	233	5.0	
BNP	Jaymie McCoy	101	2.2	
Turnout		4,713	39.7	
Conservative hold		Swing		
Conservative hold		Swing		
Conservative hold		Swing		

=== Longlands ===
Longlands (2)
Party	Candidate	Votes	%	±%
Conservative	Gareth Bacon	2,038	64.1	
Conservative	Andy Dourmoush	1,672	52.6	
Labour	Ana Davies	868	27.3	
Labour	Donna Briant	817	25.7	
Liberal Democrats	Paul Hurren	353	11.1	
UKIP	Graham Harris	212	6.7	
Turnout		3,190	41.3	
Conservative hold		Swing		
Conservative hold		Swing		

Longlands became a 2 member ward after the cutdown of councillors from 63 to 45

=== Northumberland Heath ===
Northumberland Heath (2)
Party	Candidate	Votes	%	±%
Conservative	John Fuller	1,419	47.3	
Labour	Wendy Perfect	1,333	44.5	
Conservative	Ray Sams	1,331	44.4	
Labour	Aisha Malik-Smith	1,301	43.4	
Liberal Democrats	Paul Bargery	215	7.2	
BNP	Robert Harris	160	5.3	
Turnout		3,013	38.4	
Conservative hold		Swing		
Labour gain from Conservative		Swing		

Northumberland Heath became a 2 member ward in 2018, after the cutdown of councillors from 63 to 45.

=== Sidcup ===
Sidcup (3)
Party	Candidate	Votes	%	±%
Conservative	Cheryl Bacon	2,597	59.4	
Conservative	June Slaughter	2,426	55.5	
Conservative	Richard Diment	2,314	53.0	
Labour	Peter Charles	1,095	25.1	
Labour	Jo Chodha	1,094	25.0	
Labour	Derek Steedman	931	21.3	
Green	Jonathan Rooks	450	10.3	
Liberal Democrats	Simone Reynolds	366	8.4	
UKIP	David Kurten	296	6.8	
Liberal Democrats	Adrian Paul	292	6.7	
Liberal Democrats	David Sexton	260	5.9	
BNP	John Brooks	130	3.0	
Liberal	Laurence Williams	82	1.9	
Turnout		4,390	38.9	
Conservative hold		Swing		
Conservative hold		Swing		
Conservative hold		Swing		

=== Slade Green & Northend ===
Slade Green & Northend (2)
Party	Candidate	Votes	%	±%
Labour	Brenda Langstead	1,291	53.9	
Labour	Stefano Borella	1,272	53.1	
Conservative	Graham D'Amiral	668	27.9	
Conservative	Viny Poon	575	24.0	
UKIP	Mac McGannon	305	12.7	
Green	Sophie Chaise	289	12.1	
Turnout		2,409	29.8	
Labour win (new seat)				
Labour win (new seat)				

=== St Mary's & St James ===
St Mary's & St James (2)
Party	Candidate	Votes	%	±%
Conservative	Alan Downing	2,273	70.2	
Conservative	Alex Sawyer	2,049	63.3	
Labour	Teresa Gray	788	24.4	
Labour	John Browning	747	23.1	
Liberal Democrats	David Nicolle	328	10.1	
Turnout		3,255	40.4	
Conservative win (new seat)				
Conservative win (new seat)				

=== Thamesmead East ===
Thamesmead East (3)
Party	Candidate	Votes	%	±%
Labour	Esther Amaning	1,932	69.5	
Labour	Danny Hackett	1,868	67.2	
Labour	Mabel Ogundayo	1,856	66.8	
Conservative	Mark Brooks	661	23.8	
Conservative	Elzbieta Boryslawska	596	21.4	
Conservative	Bonny Umeadi	490	17.6	
CPA	Endy Ezenwata	270	9.7	
Turnout		2,852	29.3	
Labour hold		Swing		
Labour hold		Swing		
Labour hold		Swing		

Former Labour councillor, Endy Ezenwata, defected to the Christian Peoples Alliance and subsequently lost re-election. Former councillor for Lesnes Abbey, Danny Hackett, stood here following the abolition of his former ward.

On 23 February 2019, Danny Hackett resigned from the Labour Party, citing a culture of "anti-Semitism, hatred and bullying." He will now sit as an Independent.

=== West Heath ===
West Heath (3)
Party	Candidate	Votes	%	±%
Conservative	Peter Reader	2,831	58.7	
Conservative	John Davey	2,726	56.5	
Conservative	Phillip Read	2,663	55.2	
Labour	Ian McCawley	1,639	34.0	
Labour	Ade Osayomi	1,361	28.2	
Labour	Folasade Oduja	1,324	27.5	
UKIP	Steve Reader	438	9.1	
Liberal Democrats	Stuart Weedon	390	8.1	
Turnout		4,854	40.7	
Conservative win (new seat)				
Conservative win (new seat)				
Conservative win (new seat)				

Mayor of the time, Peter Reader, stood here. John Davey became deputy mayor after the election.

== 2018-2022 by-elections ==
=== Longlands ===
Longlands: 6 May 2021
Party	Candidate	Votes	%	±%
Conservative	Lisa-Jane Moore	2,467	62.1	▼3.4
Labour	David Tingle	859	21.6	▼3.4
Green	Jon Rooks	323	8.1	New
Liberal Democrats	Paul Hurren	279	6.9	▼3.2
Heritage	Linda Purcell	49	1.2	New
Majority		1,608	40.5	
Turnout		3,977		
Conservative hold		Swing		
