= 2006 Bexley London Borough Council election =

2006 Bexley Council election
← 2002	4 May 2006	2010 →

All 63 seats to Bexley London Borough Council 32 seats needed for a majority
	First party	Second party
Party	Conservative	Labour
Seats won	54	9
Seat change	▲24	▼23
Popular vote	37,564	18,539
Percentage	50.0%	24.7%
Swing	▲8.4%	▼8.3%
- Map of the results of the 2006 Bexley council election. Conservatives in blue and Labour in red.
Council control before election
Labour
Council control after election
Conservative

The 2006 Bexley Council election took place on 4 May 2006 to elect members of Bexley London Borough Council in London, England. The whole council was up for election and the Conservative Party gained control of the council from the Labour Party.

== Election result ==
Bexley local election result 2006
Party	Seats	Gains	Losses	Net gain/loss	Seats %	Votes %	Votes	+/−
Conservative	54	24	0	▲24	85.7	50.0	37,564	▲8.4
Labour	9	0	23	▼23	14.3	24.7	18,539	▼8.3
Liberal Democrats	0	0	1	▼1	0.0	11.6	8,732	▼3.4
Independent	0	0	0	0	0.0	5.1	3,864	▲2.8
BNP	0	0	0	0	0.0	3.8	2,869	▲1.8
UKIP	0	0	0	0	0.0	2.7	2,027	▼2.7
Thamesmead Community Party	0	0	0	0	0.0	0.8	628	New
Orange Squash	0	0	0	0	0.0	0.8	583	New
English Democrat	0	0	0	0	0.0	0.5	392	New

== Ward results ==
=== Barnehurst ===
Barnehurst (3)
Party	Candidate	Votes	%	±%
Conservative	William McEwen	2,333	58.4	
Conservative	Richard Gillespie	2,223		
Conservative	Simon Windle	2,188		
Labour	Charan Gill	735	18.4	
Labour	John Husband	685		
Labour	Derek Steedman	653		
UKIP	Barrie Thomas	513	12.9	
Liberal Democrats	Maurice Morpurgo	411	10.3	
Turnout			45.6	
Conservative hold		Swing		
Conservative hold		Swing		
Conservative hold		Swing		

=== Belvedere ===
Belvedere (3)
Party	Candidate	Votes	%	±%
Conservative	David Leaf	1,287	43.0	
Labour	Daniel Francis	1,268	42.4	
Conservative	John Fuller	1,256		
Labour	Janet White	1,168		
Conservative	Gooroodev Nangon	1,050		
Labour	John Pegg	1,041		
Liberal Democrats	Lesley Morpurgo	439	14.7	
Turnout			35.9	
Conservative gain from Labour		Swing		
Labour hold		Swing		
Conservative gain from Labour		Swing		

=== Blackfen and Lamorbey ===
Blackfen and Lamorbey (3)
Party	Candidate	Votes	%	±%
Conservative	Brian Beckwith	1,830	51.8	
Conservative	Peter Craske	1,804		
Conservative	Katherine Perrior	1,777		
UKIP	Michael Barnbrook	821	23.2	
UKIP	John Dunford	669		
UKIP	George Wright	664		
Labour	Carole Borella	494	14.0	
Labour	Bernard Justham	440		
Labour	Josephine Chodha	437		
Liberal Democrats	Doreen La Roche	391	11.1	
Liberal Democrats	John La Roche	363		
Liberal Democrats	Peter Scopes	355		
Turnout			44.3	
Conservative hold		Swing		
Conservative hold		Swing		
Conservative hold		Swing		

=== Blendon and Penhill ===
Blendon and Penhill (3)
Party	Candidate	Votes	%	±%
Conservative	Margaret Cammish	2,445	73.3	
Conservative	Graham D'Amiral	2,364		
Conservative	Nicholas O'Hare	2,287		
Liberal Democrats	Michael Jaques	450	13.5	
Labour	David Prior	441	13.2	
Liberal Democrats	Kaye Cudmore	430		
Liberal Democrats	John Cudmore	415		
Labour	Gerda Slater	400		
Labour	Stuart Slater	387		
Turnout			42.1	
Conservative hold		Swing		
Conservative hold		Swing		
Conservative hold		Swing		

=== Brampton ===
Brampton (3)
Party	Candidate	Votes	%	±%
Conservative	Ronald French	2,596	59.9	
Conservative	Teresa O'Neill	2,537		
Conservative	John Wilkinson	2,406		
Labour	Joanne Browning	802	18.5	
Labour	Christopher Kirby	734		
Labour	John Perry	710		
Liberal Democrats	Barry Standen	531	12.3	
Liberal Democrats	Susan Hall	515		
Liberal Democrats	Peggy Wagstaff	431		
UKIP	William Jenner	404	9.3	
Turnout			50.3	
Conservative hold		Swing		
Conservative hold		Swing		
Conservative hold		Swing		

=== Christchurch ===
Christchurch (3)
Party	Candidate	Votes	%	±%
Conservative	Roy Ashmole	2,205	63.9	
Conservative	Ian Clement	2,188		
Conservative	Leonard Newton	2,098		
Labour	Stephanie David	733	21.2	
Labour	Floyd Millen	633		
Labour	Peter West	621		
Liberal Democrats	Maureen Hall	513	14.9	
Liberal Democrats	David Hall	501		
Liberal Democrats	Betty Lockington	443		
Turnout			42.2	
Conservative hold		Swing		
Conservative hold		Swing		
Conservative hold		Swing		

=== Colyers ===
Colyers (3)
Party	Candidate	Votes	%	±%
Conservative	Christopher Brockwell	1,506	44.7	
Conservative	David Cammish	1,415		
Conservative	David Hurt	1,349		
Labour	Ronald Browning	1,175	34.9	
Labour	Patricia Ball	1,165		
Labour	Peter Kilner	1,163		
Independent	Sally Briant	397	11.8	
Independent	Dianne Joyce	387		
Independent	Joanne Wilfort	321		
Liberal Democrats	Angela Thick	293	8.7	
Turnout			40.5	
Conservative gain from Labour		Swing		
Conservative gain from Labour		Swing		
Conservative gain from Labour		Swing		

=== Cray Meadows ===
Cray Meadows (3)
Party	Candidate	Votes	%	±%
Conservative	Cheryl Bacon	1,947	53.3	
Conservative	Rosaline Downing	1,903		
Conservative	Donald Massey	1,865		
Labour	Helen Cash	1,065	29.2	
Labour	Stefano Borella	1,019		
Labour	Michael O'Neill	995		
Independent	Barry Parfett	640	17.5	
Independent	Elaine Cheeseman	631		
Independent	Laurence Williams	611		
Turnout			46.4	
Conservative gain from Labour		Swing		
Conservative gain from Labour		Swing		
Conservative gain from Labour		Swing		

=== Crayford ===
Crayford (3)
Party	Candidate	Votes	%	±%
Conservative	Geraldene Lucia-Hennis	1,378	36.5	
Conservative	Howard Marriner	1,345		
Conservative	Melvin Seymour	1,286		
Labour	John Shepheard	1,180	31.3	
Labour	Tonya Kelsey	1,147		
Labour	Trevor Perrin	1,058		
BNP	Stephen James	786	20.8	
Liberal Democrats	Amanda Buckley	430	11.4	
Turnout			42.3	
Conservative gain from Labour		Swing		
Conservative gain from Labour		Swing		
Conservative gain from Labour		Swing		

=== Danson Park ===
Danson Park (3)
Party	Candidate	Votes	%	±%
Conservative	Linda Bailey	2,011	59.3	
Conservative	Sharon Massey	2,002		
Conservative	John Waters	1,985		
Liberal Democrats	James McVeigh	915	27.0	
Liberal Democrats	Paul Hurren	875		
Liberal Democrats	Tejinder Singh Aulakh	815		
Labour	Alan Scutt	466	13.7	
Labour	Linda Husband	453		
Labour	Peter Hollamby	453		
Turnout			44.1	
Conservative hold		Swing		
Conservative hold		Swing		
Conservative hold		Swing		

=== East Wickham ===
East Wickham (3)
Party	Candidate	Votes	%	±%
Conservative	Alfred Catterall	1,362	32.0	
Conservative	Michael Tarrant	1,340		
Conservative	James Hunt	1,234		
Labour	John Lawrenson	937	22.0	
Labour	Richard Everitt	860		
Labour	Sylvia Malt	833		
Liberal Democrats	Anthony Pickett	681	16.0	
Liberal Democrats	David Sexton	604		
BNP	Sheila Clark	601	14.1	
Liberal Democrats	Surinder Singh Manak	564		
English Democrat	John-Anthony Fitzpatrick	392	9.2	
UKIP	Malcolm Clarke	289	6.8	
UKIP	Pamela Perrin	211		
UKIP	Christopher Marshall	209		
Turnout			45.3	
Conservative gain from Liberal Democrats		Swing		
Conservative gain from Labour		Swing		
Conservative gain from Labour		Swing		

=== Erith ===
Erith (3)
Party	Candidate	Votes	%	±%
Labour	Christopher Ball	1,066	36.0	
Labour	Margaret O'Neill	939		
Conservative	Bernard Clewes	884	29.9	
Conservative	James Douglas	850		
Labour	Munir Malik	833		
Conservative	Priti Patel	653		
Independent	Stephen West	574	19.4	
Independent	Rita Grootendorst	506		
Liberal Democrats	Florence Jamieson	434	14.7	
Turnout			32.2	
Labour hold		Swing		
Labour hold		Swing		
Conservative gain from Labour		Swing		

=== Falconwood and Welling ===
Falconwood and Welling (3)
Party	Candidate	Votes	%	±%
Conservative	Nigel Betts	2,074	48.1	
Conservative	Peter Catterall	1,854		
Conservative	Valerie Clark	1,721		
BNP	James Seadon	1,001	23.2	
Labour	Stephen Perfect	640	14.9	
Liberal Democrats	Andrew O'Gorman	593	13.8	
Liberal Democrats	Edward Shrimpton	588		
Labour	Mavis Persaud	540		
Liberal Democrats	Gurdeepak Singh Chaggar	540		
Labour	Carol Pieri	517		
Turnout			48.2	
Conservative hold		Swing		
Conservative hold		Swing		
Conservative hold		Swing		

=== Lesnes Abbey ===
Lesnes Abbey (3)
Party	Candidate	Votes	%	±%
Conservative	John Davey	1,860	42.5	
Conservative	Margaret Hurt	1,710		
Conservative	Kirsty Duncombe	1,707		
Labour	Ronald Brown	1,450	33.1	
Labour	Samuel Blake	1,422		
Labour	Corinna Huxley	1,253		
Orange Squash	Gary Cripps	583	13.3	
Liberal Democrats	Peter Hofford	482	11.0	
Turnout			45.3	
Conservative gain from Labour		Swing		
Conservative gain from Labour		Swing		
Conservative gain from Labour		Swing		

=== Longlands ===
Longlands (3)
Party	Candidate	Votes	%	±%
Conservative	Gareth Bacon	1,966	55.0	
Conservative	Kenneth McAndrew	1,956		
Conservative	Michael Slaughter	1,921		
Independent	Michael Lowe	633	17.7	
Labour	Clifford Judge	517	14.5	
Liberal Democrats	Zoe Brooks	456	12.8	
Liberal Democrats	Margaret Shrimpton	449		
Labour	Garth Pilling-Lindsell	446		
Labour	Philip Scrivener	434		
Liberal Democrats	John Brooks	431		
Turnout			43.3	
Conservative hold		Swing		
Conservative hold		Swing		
Conservative hold		Swing		

=== North End ===
North End (3)
Party	Candidate	Votes	%	±%
Labour	John Eastaugh	1,093	36.0	
Labour	Brenda Langstead	1,070		
Labour	Alan Deadman	962		
Conservative	Sylvia Cassells	637	21.0	
Conservative	Bernard Gillespie	601		
Independent	Simon Goding	553	18.2	
Conservative	Edgar Silvester	498		
BNP	John Bowles	481	15.9	
Liberal Democrats	William Shrimpton	269	8.9	
Turnout			31.9	
Labour hold		Swing		
Labour hold		Swing		
Labour hold		Swing		

=== Northumberland Heath ===
Northumberland Heath (3)
Party	Candidate	Votes	%	±%
Conservative	Helen Fuller	1,975	52.7	
Conservative	Peter Reader	1,913		
Conservative	Alex Sawyer	1,806		
Labour	Geoffrey Hacker	1,280	34.1	
Labour	Kathryn Smith	1,236		
Labour	Edward Akuamoah-Boateng	1,202		
Liberal Democrats	Paul Bargery	496	13.2	
Turnout			46.6	
Conservative gain from Labour		Swing		
Conservative gain from Labour		Swing		
Conservative gain from Labour		Swing		

=== St Mary's ===
St Mary's (3)
Party	Candidate	Votes	%	±%
Conservative	Colin Campbell	2,596	72.5	
Conservative	Alan Downing	2,546		
Conservative	Colin Tandy	2,472		
Labour	Joseph Riches	493	13.8	
Liberal Democrats	Angela Nurse	491	13.7	
Labour	Broderick Bassett	487		
Labour	Teresa Pearce	481		
Liberal Democrats	David Nicolle	454		
Liberal Democrats	Shule Basaran	413		
Turnout			45.4	
Conservative hold		Swing		
Conservative hold		Swing		
Conservative hold		Swing		

=== St Michael's ===
St Michael's (3)
Party	Candidate	Votes	%	±%
Conservative	Joseph Pollard	2,062	57.0	
Conservative	Raymond Sams	1,907		
Conservative	Matthew Scott	1,890		
Labour	Wendy Perfect	1,101	30.4	
Labour	Grant Blowers	1,090		
Labour	Matthew Murphy	1,023		
Liberal Democrats	Janette Codd	457	12.6	
Liberal Democrats	Colin Wright	450		
Liberal Democrats	Philip Codd	413		
Turnout			46.5	
Conservative gain from Labour		Swing		
Conservative gain from Labour		Swing		
Conservative gain from Labour		Swing		

=== Sidcup ===
Sidcup (3)
Party	Candidate	Votes	%	±%
Conservative	Aileen Beckwith	2,127	57.1	
Conservative	Jacqueline Evans	2,099		
Conservative	June Slaughter	2,090		
Independent	Graham Holland	1,067	28.6	
Independent	Robert Griffiths	966		
Independent	David Gorton	850		
Labour	Colin Dawes	532	14.3	
Labour	Robert Bedwell	523		
Labour	Doreen Ives	470		
Turnout			44.7	
Conservative hold		Swing		
Conservative hold		Swing		
Conservative hold		Swing		

=== Thamesmead East ===
Thamesmead East (3)
Party	Candidate	Votes	%	±%
Labour	Sandra Bauer	1,071	49.1	
Labour	Harbans Singh Buttar	983		
Labour	Harry Persaud	956		
Thamesmead Community Party	Jenny Bellinger	628	28.8	
Thamesmead Community Party	Jeremy Cotton	573		
Thamesmead Community Party	Anthony Cusack	544		
Conservative	Irene Reader	483	22.1	
Conservative	Irma Nangon	438		
Conservative	Philip Read	228		
Turnout			26.2	
Labour hold		Swing		
Labour hold		Swing		
Labour hold		Swing		
