= Erith (ward) =

Electoral ward in Bexley, London, England

- Electoral ward for the Bexley London Borough Council
- Borough: Bexley
- County: Greater London
- Population: 13,102 (2021)
- Major settlements: Erith
- Area: 5,785/km²

Current electoral ward
- Created: 1978
- Councillors: 2

Erith is an electoral ward in the London Borough of Bexley. The ward was first used in the 1978 elections. It elects two councillors to Bexley London Borough Council.

== Geography ==
The ward is named after the area of Erith.

== Councillors ==
Election	Councillors	
2022	Christopher Ball (Labour)	Nicola Taylor (Labour)

== Elections ==
=== 2022 Bexley London Borough Council election ===
Erith (2 seats)
Party	Candidate	Votes	%	±%
Labour	Christopher Ball	1,512	70.1	
Labour	Nicola Taylor*	1,469	68.1	+5.7
Conservative	David Li	670	31.1	
Conservative	Masbah Khan	664	30.8	
Turnout		4,315	27.9	−4.52
Labour hold		Swing		
Labour hold		Swing		
