= 2014 Bexley London Borough Council election =

Local election in England

2014 Bexley Borough Council election
- 1 May 2014

All 63 seats to Bexley London Borough Council 32 seats needed for a majority

	First party	Second party	Third party
Party	Conservative	Labour	UKIP
Last election	52 seats, 43.2%	11 seats, 24.5%	0 seats, 2.0%
Seats won	45	15	3
Seat change	▼7	▲4	▲3
Popular vote	30,528	20,561	18,044
Percentage	38.1%	25.7%	22.5%
Swing	▼5.1%	▲1.2%	▲20.5%
- Map of the results of the 2014 Bexley council election. Conservatives in blue, Labour in red and UKIP in purple.
Council control before election
Conservative
Council control after election
Conservative

The 2014 Bexley Council election took place on 22 May 2014 to elect members of Bexley London Borough Council in England. This was on the same day as other local elections.

== Overall results ==
The Conservatives retained control of the council, winning 45 seats (-7). However, both Labour (+4) and UKIP (+3) gained seats from the Conservatives.

Bexley London Borough Council Election Result 2014
Party	Seats	Gains	Losses	Net gain/loss	Seats %	Votes %	Votes	+/−
Conservative	45	0	7	-7	71.4	38.1	30,528	-5.1
Labour	15	4	0	+4	23.8	25.7	20,561	+1.2
UKIP	3	3	0	+3	4.8	22.5	18,044	+20.5
BNP	0	0	0	0	0.0	7.7	6,178	-2.9
Liberal Democrats	0	0	0	0	0.0	2.7	2,162	-10.7
Green	0	0	0	0	0.0	1.5	1,238	+0.7
Independent	0	0	0	0	0.0	1.1	884	+0.5
CPA	0	0	0	0	0.0	0.3	275	±0.0
TUSC	0	0	0	0	0.0	0.2	169	New

== Ward results ==
=== Barnehurst ===
Barnehurst (3)
Party	Candidate	Votes	%	±%
Conservative	Howard Marriner	1,463	42.4	
Conservative	Eileen Pallen	1,427	41.4	
Conservative	David Hurt	1,424	41.3	
UKIP	Mike Ferro	1,153	33.4	
UKIP	Barrie Thomas	1,125	32.6	
UKIP	Harry Buttar	1,065	30.9	
Labour	Matthew Murphy	671	19.5	
Labour	Ron Brown	655	19.0	
Labour	Pauline Turner	634	18.4	
BNP	Paul Hulme	89	2.6	
Turnout		3,449	42.3	
Conservative hold		Swing		
Conservative hold		Swing		
Conservative hold		Swing		

=== Belvedere ===
Belvedere (3)
Party	Candidate	Votes	%	±%
Labour	Daniel Francis	1,546	45.0	
Labour	Gillian MacDonald	1,506	43.9	
Labour	Seán Newman	1,358	39.6	
UKIP	Catherine Reilly	1,130	32.9	
Conservative	Shirley Vick	903	26.3	
Conservative	Amandeep Bhogal	862	25.1	
Conservative	Pardeep Bhogal	838	24.4	
BNP	Brian Haslam	328	9.6	
CPA	Sid Cordle	143	4.2	
CPA	Toyin Ogunyemi	78	2.3	
CPA	Joel Ogunyemi	72	2.1	
Turnout		3,432	38.7	
Labour hold		Swing		
Labour hold		Swing		
Labour gain from Conservative		Swing		

=== Blackfen & Lamorbey ===
Blackfen & Lamorbey (3)
Party	Candidate	Votes	%	±%
Conservative	Brian Beckwith	1,304	38.1	
Conservative	Peter Craske	1,270	37.1	
UKIP	Lynn Smith	1,225	35.8	
Conservative	Chris Taylor	1,123	32.8	
Independent	Richard Barnbrook	884	25.8	
Independent	Elwyn Bryant	645	18.8	
Independent	Nicholas Dowling	575	16.8	
Labour	Judith Jackson	515	15.0	
Labour	David Dalton	473	13.8	
Labour	Mick McCartney	465	13.6	
BNP	Chris Wait	287	8.4	
Liberal Democrats	Paul Hurren	151	4.4	
Turnout		3,423	41.6	
Conservative hold		Swing		
Conservative hold		Swing		
UKIP gain from Conservative		Swing		

=== Blendon and Penhill ===
Blendon and Penhill (3)
Party	Candidate	Votes	%	±%
Conservative	Steven Hall	1,805	51.9	
Conservative	Graham d'Amiral	1,761	50.6	
Conservative	Nick O'Hare	1,672	48.1	
UKIP	Martin Harradine	1,289	37.1	
Labour	Dave Prior	714	20.5	
Labour	Gerda Slater	621	17.9	
Labour	Stuart Slater	574	16.5	
BNP	Erin Bradley	390	11.2	
Turnout		3,478	41.2	
Conservative hold		Swing		
Conservative hold		Swing		
Conservative hold		Swing		

=== Brampton ===
Brampton (3)
Party	Candidate	Votes	%	±%
Conservative	Teresa O'Neill	2,052	53.0	
Conservative	Sybil Camsey	2,040	52.6	
Conservative	John Wilkinson	1,821	47.0	
UKIP	John Dunford	1,280	33.0	
Labour	Margaret O'Neill	874	22.6	
Labour	Michael O'Neill	810	20.9	
Labour	Paul O'Neill	726	18.7	
BNP	Maureen Slaughter	268	6.9	
Turnout		3,875	45.5	
Conservative hold		Swing		
Conservative hold		Swing		
Conservative hold		Swing		

=== Christchurch ===
Christchurch (3)
Party	Candidate	Votes	%	±%
Conservative	Roy Ashmole	1,542	44.7	
Conservative	John Fuller	1,541	44.7	
Conservative	Brad Smith	1,461	42.3	
UKIP	Rick Millward	1,090	31.6	
Labour	Eric Davies	859	24.9	
Labour	Kathy Steedman	757	21.9	
Labour	Peter West	650	18.8	
Liberal Democrats	David Hall	267	7.7	
BNP	Ben Scott	241	7.0	
Liberal Democrats	Suleyman Tank	158	4.6	
Liberal Democrats	Fikret Tosun	130	3.8	
Turnout		3,451	39.6	
Conservative hold		Swing		
Conservative hold		Swing		
Conservative hold		Swing		

=== Colyers ===
Colyers (3)
Party	Candidate	Votes	%	±%
Conservative	Brian Bishop	1,223	39.4	
UKIP	Mac McGannon	1,112	35.9	
Conservative	Maxine Fothergill	1,111	35.8	
Labour	Andy Smith	995	32.1	
Conservative	Conor Lucking	963	31.1	
Labour	Ibby Mehmet	915	29.5	
Labour	Tosin Okuleye	896	28.9	
BNP	Peter Finch	383	12.4	
TUSC	Richard Juby	169	5.4	
Turnout		3,101	40.3	
Conservative hold		Swing		
UKIP gain from Conservative		Swing		
Conservative hold		Swing		

=== Cray Meadows ===
Cray Meadows (3)
Party	Candidate	Votes	%	±%
Conservative	Cheryl Bacon	1,464	46.7	
Conservative	Ross Downing	1,312	41.9	
Conservative	Donald Massey	1,287	41.1	
UKIP	Steve Reader	1,029	32.8	
Labour	Luke Watkins	737	23.5	
Labour	Lareo Riviere	708	22.6	
Labour	Ailar Hashemzadeh	636	20.3	
BNP	John Brooks	262	8.4	
Liberal Democrats	Jawharah Albakri	164	5.2	
CPA	Laurence Williams	132	4.2	
Turnout		3,134	36.3	
Conservative hold		Swing		
Conservative hold		Swing		
Conservative hold		Swing		

=== Crayford ===
Crayford (3)
Party	Candidate	Votes	%	±%
Conservative	Christine Bishop	1,575	45.4	
Conservative	Geraldene Lucia-Hennis	1,547	44.6	
Conservative	John Davey	1,466	42.2	
Labour	John Shepheard	1,266	36.5	
Labour	Alexis Chase	1,161	33.5	
Labour	Wendy Perfect	1,126	32.4	
BNP	Stephen James	539	15.5	
Turnout		3,470	37.6	
Conservative hold		Swing		
Conservative hold		Swing		
Conservative hold		Swing		

=== Danson Park ===
Danson Park (3)
Party	Candidate	Votes	%	±%
Conservative	Linda Bailey	1,668	50.3	
Conservative	Sharon Massey	1,493	45.0	
Conservative	John Waters	1,425	42.9	
UKIP	Malcolm Clarke	1,094	33.0	
Labour	Pat Ball	792	23.9	
Labour	John Browning	731	22.0	
Labour	Alan Scutt	645	19.4	
BNP	Ronald Slaughter	295	8.9	
Liberal Democrats	Robin Kelly	215	6.5	
Turnout		3,319	39.2	
Conservative hold		Swing		
Conservative hold		Swing		
Conservative hold		Swing		

=== East Wickham ===
East Wickham (3)
Party	Candidate	Votes	%	±%
Conservative	Christine Catterall	1,334	39.4	
Conservative	James Hunt	1,238	36.6	
Conservative	Cafer Munur	1,070	31.6	
UKIP	Rob Comley	1,020	30.1	
UKIP	John Fennelly	944	27.9	
Labour	Ronnie Banks	823	24.3	
Labour	Denis Daniels	776	22.9	
Labour	Sylvia Malt	765	22.6	
BNP	Michael Jones	381	11.3	
BNP	Nicola Finch	346	10.2	
BNP	Jaymie McCoy	216	6.4	
Liberal Democrats	David Sexton	170	5.0	
Turnout		3,385	39.9	
Conservative hold		Swing		
Conservative hold		Swing		
Conservative hold		Swing		

=== Erith ===
Erith (3)
Party	Candidate	Votes	%	±%
Labour	Edward Boateng	1,430	46.5	
Labour	Joe Ferreira	1,393	45.3	
Labour	Abena Oppong-Asare	1,208	39.3	
UKIP	Keith Forster	987	32.1	
Conservative	Megan Clement	834	27.1	
Conservative	Therese Oliver	813	26.5	
Conservative	Tosin Femi-Adedayo	634	20.6	
BNP	Robert Howard	323	10.5	
Turnout		3,073	35.6	
Labour hold		Swing		
Labour hold		Swing		
Labour hold		Swing		

=== Falconwood and Welling ===
Falconwood and Welling (3)
Party	Candidate	Votes	%	±%
Conservative	Nigel Betts	1,770	46.7	
Conservative	Val Clark	1,498	41.1	
Conservative	Louie French	1,445	40.0	
UKIP	Pamela Perrin	1,271	34.9	
Labour	Dennis Ball	816	22.4	
Labour	Stephen Perfect	812	22.3	
Labour	Josephine Choda	720	19.8	
BNP	Jimmy Dobson	398	10.9	
Liberal Democrats	Betty Lockington	231	6.3	
Turnout		3,642	42.6	
Conservative hold		Swing		
Conservative hold		Swing		
Conservative hold		Swing		

=== Lesnes Abbey ===
Lesnes Abbey (3)
Party	Candidate	Votes	%	±%
Labour	Danny Hackett	1,454	39.5	
Labour	Esther Amaning	1,409	38.3	
Labour	John Husband	1,402	38.1	
Conservative	Kerry Allon	1,181	32.1	
UKIP	Chris Attard	1,137	30.9	
Conservative	Elizabeth Anderson	1,131	30.7	
Conservative	Keima Allen	1,084	29.4	
BNP	Carl Bussey	284	7.7	
Turnout		3,683	42.2	
Labour hold		Swing		
Labour hold		Swing		
Labour hold		Swing		

=== Longlands ===
Longlands (3)
Party	Candidate	Votes	%	±%
Conservative	Gareth Bacon	1,754	52.8	
Conservative	David Leaf	1,577	47.5	
Conservative	Andy Dourmoush	1,394	42.0	
UKIP	Nick Ebdon	1,050	31.6	
Labour	Ana Dakshy	712	21.4	
Labour	Bryan Harrod	666	20.0	
Labour	Bryan Moran	643	19.4	
Liberal Democrats	Michael Jaques	279	8.4	
Liberal Democrats	Maurea Spaull	220	6.6	
Turnout		3,322	39.7	
Conservative hold		Swing		
Conservative hold		Swing		
Conservative hold		Swing		

=== North End ===
North End (3)
Party	Candidate	Votes	%	±%
Labour	Brenda Langstead	1,267	47.3	
Labour	Alan Deadman	1,178	44.0	
Labour	Stef Borella	1,174	43.8	
Conservative	Christopher Tugwell	700	26.1	
Conservative	Lydia Taiwo	691	25.8	
Conservative	Slava Ibelgauptas	620	23.2	
BNP	Mark Horne	407	15.2	
Green	Sophie Chaise	352	13.1	
Green	Sarah Newton	331	12.4	
Green	Isobel Whittaker	315	11.8	
Turnout		2,678	33.3	
Labour hold		Swing		
Labour hold		Swing		
Labour hold		Swing		

=== Northumberland Heath ===
Northumberland Heath (3)
Party	Candidate	Votes	%	±%
Conservative	Peter Reader	1,779	51.8	
Conservative	Philip Read	1,773	51.6	
Conservative	Melvin Seymour	1,554	45.2	
Labour	Olivia McLennan	1,186	34.5	
Labour	Baljeet Singh Gill	1,155	33.6	
Labour	Timothy Nicholls	1,062	30.9	
BNP	Paul Carver	444	12.9	
Liberal Democrats	Paul Bargery	273	7.9	
Turnout		3,436	42.1	
Conservative hold		Swing		
Conservative hold		Swing		
Conservative hold		Swing		

=== St Mary's ===
St Mary's (3)
Party	Candidate	Votes	%	±%
Conservative	Alan Downing	2,181	59.8	
Conservative	Colin Tandy	2,112	57.9	
Conservative	Alex Sawyer	1,963	53.8	
Labour	Donna Briant	625	17.1	
Labour	Pamela Carter	576	15.8	
Labour	Bernard Justham	510	14.0	
Green	Stuart Carter	356	9.8	
Green	Jonathan Rooks	323	8.9	
Green	Derek Moran	312	8.6	
BNP	Mark Bryant	271	7.4	
Liberal Democrats	Angela Nurse	179	4.9	
Liberal Democrats	Shule Basaran	162	4.4	
Liberal Democrats	David Nicolle	158	4.3	
Turnout		3,649	42.9	
Conservative hold		Swing		
Conservative hold		Swing		
Conservative hold		Swing		

=== St Michael's ===
St Michael's (3)
Party	Candidate	Votes	%	±%
Conservative	Caroline Newton	1,352	42.8	
Conservative	Joe Pollard	1,314	41.6	
UKIP	Chris Beazley	1,280	40.6	
Conservative	Ray Sams	1,140	36.1	
Labour	Cathy Deadman	857	27.2	
Labour	Derek Steedman	769	24.4	
Labour	Steven McKenzie	720	22.8	
BNP	Laurence Picton	407	12.9	
Turnout		3,156	37.9	
Conservative hold		Swing		
Conservative hold		Swing		
UKIP gain from Conservative		Swing		

=== Sidcup ===
Sidcup (3)
Party	Candidate	Votes	%	±%
Conservative	Rob Leitch	1,925	52.5	
Conservative	Aileen Beckwith	1,921	52.4	
Conservative	June Slaughter	1,887	51.4	
UKIP	Colin Burnell	897	24.5	
Labour	Jonathan Holman	691	18.8	
Labour	Tonya Kelsey	657	17.9	
Labour	Peter Smith	570	15.5	
Green	Jacqueline Bates	530	14.4	
Liberal Democrats	Abiodun Adetola	233	6.4	
BNP	Lucy Money	181	4.9	
Turnout		3,668	40.6	
Conservative hold		Swing		
Conservative hold		Swing		
Conservative hold		Swing		

=== Thamesmead East ===
Thamesmead East (3)
Party	Candidate	Votes	%	±%
Labour	Derry Begho	1,731	64.4	
Labour	Mabel Ogundayo	1,693	63.0	
Labour	Endy Ezenwata	1,687	62.8	
Conservative	Irene Reader	719	26.8	
Conservative	Natalie Read	667	24.8	
Conservative	Diana Sudds	633	23.6	
Turnout		2,686	32.8	
Labour hold		Swing		
Labour hold		Swing		
Labour hold		Swing		
