= 2026 Bexley London Borough Council election =

2026 English local government election

- 7 May 2026

All 45 seats to Bexley London Borough Council 23 seats needed for a majority
- Registered: 176,925
- Turnout: 80,894; 45.7% (▲8.6)

	First party	Second party	Third party
Leader	David Leaf	Stefano Borella
Party	Conservative	Labour	Reform
Last election	33 seats, 50.8%	12 seats, 44.0%	0 seats, 0.7%
Seats before	30	12	0
Seats won	29	9	7
Seat change	▼4	▼3	▲7
- Map of the results. Conservatives in blue, Labour in red, Reform in teal.
Leader before election
David Leaf
Conservative
Leader after election
David Leaf
Conservative

The 2026 Bexley London Borough Council election took place on 7 May 2026, as part of the 2026 United Kingdom local elections. All 45 members of Bexley London Borough Council were up for election. The election took place alongside local elections in the other London boroughs.

The Conservatives maintained control of the council, having held control since 2006, losing four seats. Labour remained the largest opposition party despite losing three seats, and Reform UK won its first seven seats.

== History ==
Result of the 2022 election

The thirty-two London boroughs were established in 1965 by the London Government Act 1963. They are the principal authorities in Greater London and have responsibilities including education, housing, planning, highways, social services, libraries, recreation, waste, environmental health and revenue collection. Some of the powers are shared with the Greater London Authority, which also manages passenger transport, police, and fire.

Bexley has generally been controlled by the Conservatives since its creation, except for the elections of 1964, 1971 and 2002 which resulted in Labour councils, and the 1994 council election which resulted in no overall control. In the 2022 election, the Conservatives won 33 seats with 50.8% of the vote across Bexley, whilst Labour won 10 seats with 44.0% of the vote.

=== Council term ===
Daniel Francis, sitting Labour councillor for Belvedere, was elected to the Bexleyheath and Crayford constituency at the 2024 general election. The resulting by-election saw Labour hold the seat with a reduced vote share.

In November 2025, the Conservatives selected councillor David Leaf to be the new council leader. The previous leader Teresa O'Neill, Baroness O'Neill of Bexley had served as council leader for 17 years from 2008 to 2025, when she announced her decision to stand down to focus on her work in the House of Lords.

During the term, two Conservative councillors left to sit as independents: Felix Di Netimah for Crayford, and Nigel Betts for Falconwood and Welling. James Hunt, councillor for Blackfen and Lamorbey, left the Conservatives after they did not select him to stand again, saying they "had lost its way both in Parliament and in Bexley." He joined Reform UK but sat as an independent on Bexley Council, and contested the 2026 elections as an independent.

During the 2025 Kent County Council elections, all six seats in neighbouring Dartford were won by Reform UK on 41% of the vote, with the Conservatives losing all four of their seats and dropping from 53% to 30% of the vote; and Labour losing their single seat and dropping from 31% of the vote to 18%.

== Campaign ==
David Leaf, the new leader of the majority Conservative group on the council, attacked the Labour government saying the council has faced "brutal cuts" and that they were "forced to put council tax up" by 4.99%. Leaf said "what's important for us is investing in the services that matter to our residents - whether it's supporting the thousands of residents who are elderly who benefit from social care, the hundreds of vulnerable children we protect and keep safe every day, or investing in ensuring our streets are clean."

Stefano Borella, leader of the opposition Labour group, focused on the "50,000 renters in Bexley" and defending the government's Renters' Rights Act. He said that Bexley needed more affordable housing, more council housing, and more investment in roads and pavements. In the House of Commons, the 2024-intake Bexleyheath and Crayford Labour MP Daniel Francis stated that he wanted to ensure the £895,000 of government-funded pothole repair is well spent, including on Mayplace Road East in Barnehurst.

Reform UK launched its London election campaign on 29 March, with party leader Nigel Farage saying "we are seriously competitive in Croydon, in Bromley, in Bexley, in Havering, and maybe two or three others." On 8 April, Farage campaigned in Welling. Reform candidate Miles Jones said the party would cut wasteful spending, save money, fix potholes, and conduct a "real audit of council finances". However, some compare a potential Reform administration in Bexley to Kent County Council, which Reform took majority control of in 2025 including winning all six seats in neighbouring Dartford, promising not to raise tax but then raising it by 3.99% at their first budget. Nigel Farage previously led UKIP, which won 3 seats on Bexley Council in 2014.

=== Polling ===
Dates conducted	Pollster	Sample size										
Dates conducted	Pollster	Sample size	Con	Lab	LD	Ref	Grn	Oth.	Lead			
Dates conducted	Pollster	Sample size	7 Apr – 29 Apr 2026	More in Common	2,646 (Note: Sample size is for the entirety of Greater London, of which Bexley is only one of 32 boroughs.)	30.7%	19.8%	11.0%	30.4%	6.1%	1.9%	0.3
17 Apr – 27 Apr 2026	JLPartners	2,022	29%	17%	8%	35%	8%	3%	6			
27 Mar – 21 Apr 2026	YouGov	4,548	30%	19%	9%	29%	12%	1%	1			
5 May 2022	2022 election		50.8%	44.0%	3.4%	0.7%	0.7%	0.5%	6.8			

== Electoral process ==
Bexley, as is the case all other London borough councils, elects all of its councillors at once every four years, with the previous election having taken place in 2022. The election takes place by multi-member first-past-the-post voting, with each ward being represented by two or three councillors. Electors will have as many votes as there are councillors to be elected in their ward, with the top two or three being elected.

All registered electors (British, Irish, Commonwealth and European Union citizens) living in London aged 18 or over are entitled to vote in the election. People who live at two addresses in different councils, such as university students with different term-time and holiday addresses, are entitled to be registered for and vote in elections in both local authorities. Voting in-person at polling stations takes place from 7:00 to 22:00 on election day, and voters are able to apply for postal votes or proxy votes in advance of the election.

== Candidates ==
This election is set to break numerous records. 192 candidates will be standing across 17 wards to compete for 45 seats. This is 71% higher than the 112 candidates standing in the 2022 election. Taking into account the changes in Bexley Council's size over the years, this election will see the highest number of candidates per seats available ever, having 4.27 candidates per seats compared to the second highest 2010 which had 3.38 candidates per seat (213 candidates for 63 seats).

Three parties are standing in all 45 seats up for election: the Conservatives, Labour, and Reform UK. This will be the 16th time for the Conservatives, who have stood candidates for every seat in every election except 1964; the 17th time for Labour, who have stood candidates for every seat in every election if you include a Labour and Co-operative candidate in 1986; and the first time for Reform UK, who stood for the first time in 2022 with four candidates. Reform UK will be the first third party to stand the maximum number of candidates since 1994 when the Liberal Democrats stood a full house.

The Liberal Democrats (UK) are standing 28 candidates (in 62.2% of seats), their highest number since 2010 when they stood 40 candidates (in 63.5% of seats). The Green Party of England and Wales are standing 24 candidates (in 53.3% of seats), their highest number ever, beating their previous record of 7 candidates (in 11.1% of seats) in 2014. Five separate political parties (Conservatives, Labour, Reform, Liberal Democrats, and the Greens) will be standing at least one candidate in every ward for the first time, and standing in over half of the available seats for the first time.

== Previous council composition ==
After 2022 election		Before 2026 election		After 2026 election	
Party	Seats	Party	Seats	Party	Seats
Conservative	33	Conservative	30	Conservative	29
Labour	12	Labour	12	Labour	9
		Independent	3	Reform	7

Changes 2022-2026:

- April 2023: Felix Di Netimah (Conservative) leaves party to sit as an independent
- May 2024: Nigel Betts (Conservative) leaves party to sit as an independent
- September 2024: Daniel Francis (Labour) resigns – by-election held October 2024
- October 2024: Jeremy Fosten (Labour) wins by-election
- February 2025: James Hunt (Conservative) leaves party to sit as an independent

== Results summary ==
2026 Bexley London Borough Council election
Party	Candidates						Votes		
Party	Stood	Elected	Gained	Unseated	Net	% of total	%	No.	Net %
Conservative	45	29	0	4	▼4	64.44	36.5	76,406	▼14.3
Labour	45	9	0	3	▼3	20	19.5	40,669	▼24.5
Reform	45	7	7	0	▲7	15.56	32.3	67,628	▲31.6
Green	24	0	0	0	Steady	0	7.3	15,263	▲6.6
Liberal Democrats	28	0	0	0	Steady	0	3.7	7,694	▲0.3
Working for Sidcup	1	0	0	0	New	0	0.1	191	New
TUSC	2	0	0	0	Steady	0	0.1	188	New
Independent	2	0	0	0	Steady	0	0.5	1,469	▲0.3

== Ward results ==
Statements of persons nominated were published on 9 April. Incumbent councillors are marked with an asterisk (*). Those elected are in bold. Election results available on the Bexley Council website

=== Barnehurst ===
Barnehurst (2 seats)
Party	Candidate	Votes	%	±%
**Conservative**	**Michael Gillespie**	**1,578**	**42.2**	**▼17.2**
**Conservative**	**Howard William Jackson**	**1,404**	**37.5**	
Reform	Lois Moules	1303	34.8	New
Reform	Anne Smith	1236	33.0	
Labour	Rachel Gogo	737	19.7	▼22.8
Labour	James Murphy	586	15.7	
Green	John Ely	456	12.2	New
Liberal Democrats	Lyndon Griffiths	186	5.0	New
Turnout		7,486		
Conservative **hold**		Swing		
Conservative **hold**		Swing		

=== Belvedere ===
Belvedere (3 seats)
Party	Candidate	Votes	%	±%
**Labour**	**Sally Hinkley***	**1,461**	**35.3**	**▼25.7**
**Labour**	**Jeremy Fosten***	**1,451**	**35.0**	
**Reform**	**Christopher Calvert**	**1,343**	**32.4**	**New**
Reform	Chris Frampton	1272	30.7	
Labour	Anthony Riches	1256	30.3	
Reform	Michael Wilson	1226	29.6	
Green	Sarah Barry	884	21.3	▲5.3
Conservative	Christine Bishop	867	20.9	▼17.5
Conservative	Matthew Gater	751	18.1	
Green	Clement Hollands	679	16.4	
Conservative	Masbah Khan	637	15.4	
Liberal Democrats	Sam Kanu	278	6.7	New
Liberal Democrats	David Tringham	209	5.0	
TUSC	Deji Olayinka	116	2.8	New
Turnout		12,430		
Labour **hold**		Swing		
Labour **hold**		Swing		
Reform **gain** from Labour		Swing		

=== Bexleyheath ===
Bexleyheath (3 seats)
Party	Candidate	Votes	%	±%
**Conservative**	**Hannah Gillespie**	**2,378**	**41.2**	**▼19.7**
**Conservative**	**Bola Carew***	**2,347**	**40.7**	
**Conservative**	**Rags Sandhu***	**2,243**	**38.9**	
Reform	Andrew Cronin	1934	33.5	New
Reform	Mike Lyons	1887	32.7	
Reform	Colin Grostate	1821	31.6	
Labour	Eric Davies	957	16.6	▼24.6
Labour	Lily Demetriou	941	16.3	
Labour	Brendan Keenan	803	13.9	
Green	Yolanda Allen	732	12.7	New
Green	Nancy Willmouth-Coates	643	11.1	
Liberal Democrats	Ronnie King	334	5.8	▼5.4
Liberal Democrats	Jawharah Albakri	293	5.1	
Turnout		17,313		
Conservative **hold**		Swing		
Conservative **hold**		Swing		
Conservative **hold**		Swing		

=== Blackfen and Lamorbey ===
Blackfen and Lamorbey (3 seats)
Party	Candidate	Votes	%	±%
**Conservative**	**Brian Bishop**	**2,417**	**41.4**	**▼17.9**
**Conservative**	**Peter Craske***	**2,254**	**38.6**	
**Conservative**	**Frazer Brooks**	**2,242**	**38.4**	
Reform	Robert Brooks	2240	38.3	▲29.5
Reform	Graham Holland	2142	36.7	
Reform	Lynn Smith	2066	35.4	
Green	James Brown	813	13.9	New
Labour	Nicola Iles	694	11.9	▼24.5
Labour	Tunde Adewopo	691	11.8	
Independent	James Hunt*	626	10.7	New
Labour	John Browning	603	10.3	
Liberal Democrats	James Handscombe	392	6.7	▼7.8
Liberal Democrats	Robin Kelly	355	6.1	
Turnout		17,535		
Conservative **hold**		Swing		
Conservative **hold**		Swing		
Conservative **hold**		Swing		

James Hunt was formerly a conservative councillor who sought re-election as an independent.

=== Blendon and Penhill ===
Blendon and Penhill (3 seats)
Party	Candidate	Votes	%	±%
**Conservative**	**David Leaf***	**2,676**	**46.6**	**▼18.2**
**Conservative**	**Cafer Munur**	**2,575**	**44.9**	
**Conservative**	**Nicholas O'Hare***	**2,555**	**44.5**	
Reform	Mike Ferro	2086	36.3	▲28.8
Reform	Mac Mcgannon	1988	34.6	
Reform	Jon Templer	1975	34.4	
Labour	Esther Amaning	731	12.7	▼25.1
Green	Mariam Zahedi	729	12.7	New
Labour	Pat Ball	697	12.1	
Labour	Ben Nottle	505	8.8	
Liberal Democrats	Zoe Brooks	380	6.6	▼4.9
Liberal Democrats	Shule Basaran	326	5.7	
Turnout		17,223		
Conservative **hold**		Swing		
Conservative **hold**		Swing		
Conservative **hold**		Swing		

=== Crayford ===
Crayford (3 seats)
Party	Candidate	Votes	%	±%
**Reform**	**Sandra Cerisola**	**1,756**	**38.3**	**New**
**Reform**	**Debbie Ryan**	**1,734**	**37.8**	
**Reform**	**Oke Ene**	**1,599**	**34.9**	
Conservative	Geraldene Lucia-Hennis*	1544	33.7	▼21.8
Conservative	Andrew Credgington	1493	32.6	
Conservative	Jonathan Gillespie	1453	31.7	
Labour	Sevda Bloom	1050	22.9	▼24.9
Labour	Colin Chin	1005	21.9	
Labour	Nathan Ogunleye	949	20.7	
Green	Francesca Wyvern	728	15.9	New
Liberal Democrats	Paul Barrett	439	9.6	New
Turnout		13,750		
Reform **gain** from Conservative		Swing		
Reform **gain** from Conservative		Swing		
Reform **gain** from Conservative		Swing		

=== Crook Log ===
Crook Log (3 seats)
Party	Candidate	Votes	%	±%
**Conservative**	**Chris Taylor**	**2,212**	**39.5**	**▼19.6**
**Conservative**	**Graham D'amiral**	**2,183**	**39.0**	
**Conservative**	**Janice Ward-Wilson**	**2,177**	**38.8**	
Reform	Eamonn Delaney	1875	33.4	New
Reform	John Dunford	1823	32.5	
Reform	Philip Savage	1794	32.0	
Labour	Liam Davies	1006	17.9	▼25.1
Labour	Daisy Page	997	17.8	
Labour	Tim Nicholls	880	15.7	
Green	Tony Ball	805	14.4	New
Liberal Democrats	Cemile Ahmet	362	6.5	▼9.3
Liberal Democrats	Lindsay Mackie	350	6.2	
Liberal Democrats	Giuseppe Tomaselli	285	5.1	
TUSC	Vianney Kimbugwe	72	1.3	New
Turnout		16,821		
Conservative **hold**		Swing		
Conservative **hold**		Swing		
Conservative **hold**		Swing		

=== East Wickham ===
East Wickham (3 seats)
Party	Candidate	Votes	%	±%
**Conservative**	**Steven Hall**	**2,268**	**44.7**	**▼8.4**
**Conservative**	**Caroline Newton**	**2,049**	**40.4**	
**Conservative**	**David Li**	**1,987**	**39.2**	
Reform	David Byrne	1801	35.5	New
Reform	Miles Jones	1689	33.3	
Reform	Baris Lefkonuklu	1520	30.0	
Labour	Vincent Adegoke	1007	19.8	▼27.0
Labour	Veronica Obadara	943	18.6	
Labour	Philip Segurola	842	16.6	
Green	Bob Morris	744	14.7	New
Liberal Democrats	Connor Wood	374	7.4	▼6.3
Turnout		15,224		
Conservative **hold**		Swing		
Conservative **hold**		Swing		
Conservative **hold**		Swing		

=== Erith ===
John Panetta stood for Reform UK, but withdrew their nomination.

Erith (2 seats)
Party	Candidate	Votes	%	±%
**Labour**	**Nicola Taylor***	**1,143**	**42.2**	**▼27.9**
**Labour**	**Chris Ball***	**1,089**	**40.2**	
Reform	Caroline Panetta	816	30.1	New
Reform	Geoff Williams	766	28.3	
Green	Martin Radbon	581	21.4	New
Conservative	Joe Pollard	409	15.1	▼16.0
Conservative	Gurhan Otem	405	14.9	
Liberal Democrats	Laurie Bennett	212	7.8	New
Turnout		5,421		
Labour **hold**		Swing		
Labour **hold**		Swing		

=== Falconwood and Welling ===
Falconwood and Welling (3 seats)
Party	Candidate	Votes	%	±%
**Conservative**	**Christine Catterall**	**2,191**	**40.9**	**▼16.8**
**Conservative**	**Dave Curtois**	**2,149**	**40.2**	
**Conservative**	**Barry Saunders**	**1,928**	**36.0**	
Reform	Catherine Allard	1862	34.8	▲27.9
Reform	Pamela Andrews	1837	34.3	
Reform	Nicola Jones	1713	32.0	
Labour	Ian Mccawley	828	15.5	▼26.6
Labour	Janet White	788	14.7	
Labour	Daniel Rowson	754	14.1	
Green	Mercedes Parr	743	13.9	▼1.3
Green	Lis Radbon	673	12.6	
Liberal Democrats	Richard Chown	316	5.9	New
Liberal Democrats	Luke Murphy	275	5.1	
Turnout		16,057		
Conservative **hold**		Swing		
Conservative **hold**		Swing		
Conservative **hold**		Swing		

=== Longlands ===
Longlands (2 seats)
Party	Candidate	Votes	%	±%
**Conservative**	**Oscar Harrison**	**1,853**	**47.2**	**▼10.2**
**Conservative**	**Lisa-Jane Moore***	**1,848**	**47.0**	
Reform	Alexander Cleak	1037	26.4	New
Reform	Gary Levett	999	25.4	
Labour	Ana Davies	537	13.7	▼25.6
Green	Anita Paris	453	11.5	New
Labour	Christine Landman	438	11.2	
Green	David Paris	354	9.0	
Liberal Democrats	Julian Baxter	172	4.4	▼8.8
Liberal Democrats	Paul Hurren	168	4.3	
Turnout		7,863		
Conservative **hold**		Swing		
Conservative **hold**		Swing		

=== Northumberland Heath ===
Northumberland Heath (2 seats)
Party	Candidate	Votes	%	±%
**Reform**	**Sean Brackstone**	**1,302**	**40.0**	**New**
**Reform**	**Chris Purfield**	**1,207**	**37.1**	
Labour	Baljeet Gill*	1038	31.9	▼19.9
Labour	Temilola Stewart	885	27.2	
Conservative	Marcio Fasano	702	21.6	▼22.4
Conservative	Unisa Sesay	614	18.9	
Green	Daniel Stamp	404	12.4	New
Liberal Democrats	Thomas Phillips	187	5.7	▼3.7
Liberal Democrats	Paul Bargery	174	5.3	
Turnout		6,513		
Reform **gain** from Labour		Swing		
Reform **gain** from Labour		Swing		

=== Sidcup ===
Sidcup (3 seats)
Party	Candidate	Votes	%	±%
**Conservative**	**Terry Barcock**	**2,318**	**44.6**	**▼6.7**
**Conservative**	**June Slaughter**	**2,267**	**43.6**	
**Conservative**	**Andy Curtois**	**2,052**	**39.5**	
Reform	Daniel Martin	1404	27.0	New
Reform	Ranw Aso-rashid	1312	25.2	
Reform	Daniel Kersten	1293	24.9	
Green	Laurence Williams	687	13.2	New
Green	Julian Himmerich	663	12.8	
Labour	Jo Chodha	632	12.2	▼21.8
Labour	John Cove	628	12.1	
Labour	Tonya Kelsey	628	12.1	
Green	Inke Schreiber	601	11.6	
Independent	Sue Petty	464	8.9	New
Liberal Democrats	Tristan Lowne	238	4.6	▼9.0
Liberal Democrats	David Merry	222	4.3	
Working for Sidcup	Dimitri Shvorob	191	3.7	▼3.6
Turnout		15,600		
Conservative **hold**		Swing		
Conservative **hold**		Swing		
Conservative **hold**		Swing		

=== Slade Green & Northend ===
Slade Green & Northend (2 seats)
Party	Candidate	Votes	%	±%
**Labour**	**Stefano Borella**	**1,106**	**37.5**	**▼25.1**
**Labour**	**Donna Briant**	**1,033**	**35.1**	
Reform	John McDermont	1032	35.0	New
Reform	Bright Uwhokori	976	33.1	
Conservative	Bimpe Adepoju	566	19.2	▼20.0
Green	Sarah Frost	553	18.8	New
Conservative	Adam Rook	442	15.0	
Liberal Democrats	Mark Robson	186	6.3	New
Turnout		5,894		
Labour **hold**		Swing		
Labour **hold**		Swing		

=== St Mary's & St James ===
St Mary's & St James (2 seats)
Party	Candidate	Votes	%	±%
**Conservative**	**Kurtis Christoforides**	**2,363**	**57.0**	**▼1.3**
**Conservative**	**Cameron Smith**	**2,293**	**55.3**	
Reform	Simon Francis	943	22.8	New
Reform	Garret Lynch	872	21.0	
Green	Rob Davies	447	10.8	New
Labour	Victoria Hart	390	9.4	▼25.0
Green	Marko Minka	351	8.5	
Labour	Sophia Parr	334	8.1	
Liberal Democrats	Oliver Brooks	176	4.3	▼8.4
Liberal Democrats	David Sexton	119	2.9	
Turnout		8,288		
Conservative **hold**		Swing		
Conservative **hold**		Swing		

=== Thamesmead East ===
Geoff Williams stood for Reform UK but later had their nomination withdrawn.

Thamesmead East (3 seats)
Party	Candidate	Votes	%	±%
**Labour**	**Zainab Asunramu**	**1,460**	**53.1**	**▼21.5**
**Labour**	**Larry Ferguson**	**1,361**	**49.5**	
**Labour**	**Abi Johnson**	**1,346**	**48.9**	
Green	Jonathan Rooks	745	27.1	New
Reform	Lee Delaney	700	25.4	New
Reform	Matthew Solo	658	23.9	
Reform	Tom Staples	643	23.4	
Conservative	Angela Gillespie	396	14.4	▼11.3
Conservative	Allison Hartshorn	347	12.6	
Conservative	Graham Moon	325	11.8	
Liberal Democrats	Ayo Mohammed	274	10.0	▲1.3
Turnout		8,255		
Labour **hold**		Swing		
Labour **hold**		Swing		
Labour **hold**		Swing		

=== West Heath ===
West Heath (3 seats)
Party	Candidate	Votes	%	±%
**Conservative**	**Thomas Clapperton**	**2,329**	**40.0**	**▼19.3**
**Conservative**	**Eliot Smith**	**2,198**	**37.8**	
**Reform**	**Sue Ford**	**2,130**	**36.6**	**New**
Conservative	Melvin Seymour*	2121	36.4	
Reform	Ian Rowlands	2010	34.5	
Reform	David Simmons	2006	34.5	
Labour	Ahmad Brooke	1207	20.7	▼22.3
Labour	Katty Sillah	1176	20.2	
Labour	Ray Williams	1076	18.5	
Green	Stuart Carter	795	13.7	New
Liberal Democrats	Andrew Kellett	412	7.1	New
Turnout		17,460		
Conservative **hold**		Swing		
Conservative **hold**		Swing		
Reform **gain** from Conservative		Swing		
