= Old Bexley and Sidcup =

UK Parliament constituency (since 1983)

Coordinates: 51.439°N 0.120°E

- Borough constituency for the House of Commons
- Interactive map of boundaries since 2024
- Location within Greater London
- County: Greater London
- Electorate: 74,317 (March 2020)
- Major settlements: Bexley, Sidcup, part of Welling

Current constituency
- Created: 1983
- Member of Parliament: Louie French (Conservative)
- Seats: One
- Created from: Bexleyheath (part) and Sidcup

Old Bexley and Sidcup is a constituency in Greater London represented in the House of Commons of the UK Parliament since its 1983 creation. Its first Member of Parliament (MP) was former Prime Minister Edward Heath, who previously represented Bexley (1950–1974) and Sidcup (1974–1983). The seat has been held since a 2021 by-election by Louie French of the Conservative Party, following the death of incumbent James Brokenshire.

== Constituency profile ==
Old Bexley and Sidcup is a constituency in Greater London in England, covering the southern half of the Borough of Bexley. It includes the areas of Bexley, Sidcup, Blackfen and Welling.

This constituency covers a suburban area on the outskirts of London, around 11 miles (18 km) south-east of the city centre. Prior to the large-scale suburban development during the 1930s, the constituency was rural with large Georgian, Victorian and Edwardian properties. Today, the area is mostly affluent with many green spaces and large detached and semi-detached homes. The area is served by Southeastern rail but is not served by the Transport for London network like most of the city. House prices are generally lower than the London average but higher than the UK average.

Residents have a similar age profile to the rest of the country. They have high levels of income and, unlike the rest of London, very high rates of homeownership. The child poverty rate is less than half the UK-wide figure. Residents generally have average levels of education and a high proportion work in the education and construction sectors. The percentage claiming unemployment benefits is low. White people made up 80% of the population at the 2021 census. Asians were the largest ethnic minority group at 10%.

At the local borough council, all seats in the constituency were won by Conservatives. Voters in Old Bexley and Sidcup strongly supported leaving the European Union in the 2016 referendum; an estimated 62% voted in favour of Brexit compared to the UK-wide rate of 52%.

== History ==
The seat was created in 1983 by combining a small part of the abolished seat of Bexleyheath, chiefly Old Bexley, with the abolished seat of Sidcup.

Sir Edward Heath (Prime Minister of the United Kingdom 1970–1974) held this area (also referring to its main predecessor seats, Bexley and Sidcup) from 1950 until 2001 when he retired at the age of 84, at the time the longest-serving MP in the Commons, known as the Father of the House.

On 29 January 2008 the Conservative Party withdrew the whip from the constituency's MP, Derek Conway, following alleged misuse of funds revealed by the MPs expenses controversy, who declined to resign as MP and became an independent. He retired from national politics in 2010.

Political overview

The seat has been won at general elections since creation by the Conservative Party candidate. The 1997 New Labour landslide saw the party's majority fall to its lowest level of 7% of the vote. Its greatest level has to date been 41.5% of the vote — in 1987.

In 2010 the seat was won by the Conservative candidate James Brokenshire, who had transferred to this seat and approved by his local party when his former seat of Hornchurch was abolished in boundary changes. His 2015 result made the seat the 105th safest of the Conservative Party's 331 seats by percentage of majority. The seat was left vacant following Brokenshire's death on 7 October 2021. until a by-election was held on 2 December which resulted in a Conservative hold.

== Boundaries ==
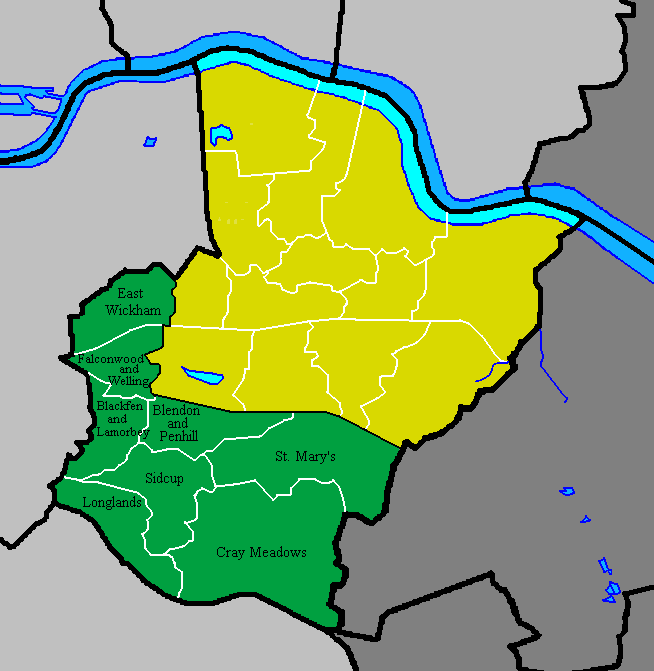
Wards of the Old Bexley and Sidcup constituency (green) within the London Borough of Bexley (yellow and green) from the 2010 general election

=== Historic ===
1983–1997: The London Borough of Bexley wards of Blackfen, Blendon and Penhill, Cray, Lamorbey, St Mary's, Sidcup East, and Sidcup West.

1997–2010: The London Borough of Bexley wards of Blackfen, Blendon and Penhill, Cray, Danson, East Wickham, Falconwood, Lamorbey, St Mary's, Sidcup East, and Sidcup West.

2010–2024: The London Borough of Bexley wards of Blackfen and Lamorbey, Blendon and Penhill, East Wickham, Falconwood and Welling, Longlands, St Mary's, and Sidcup.

As its name suggests, the seat covers the Bexley and Sidcup areas; it formerly included Danson Park which owing to more development in the south was moved to the Bexleyheath and Crayford constituency.

=== Current ===
The new boundaries of the Old Bexley and Sidcup constituency (green) within the London Borough of Bexley (yellow) to be used from the 2024 general election.

urther to the 2023 review of Westminster constituencies, which came into effect for the 2024 general election, the constituency is composed of:

- The London Borough of Bexley wards of: Blackfen & Lamorbey; Blendon & Penhill; East Wickham; Falconwood & Welling; Longlands; St. Mary’s & St. James; Sidcup.

The revised contents take into account the local government boundary review for Bexley which became effective in May 2018. Boundaries were extended slightly by adding the parts of the expanded East Wickham and Falconwood & Welling wards previously in Bexleyheath and Crayford.

== Members of Parliament ==
Election	Member	Party
1983	Edward Heath	Conservative
2001	Derek Conway	Conservative
2008	Derek Conway	Independent
2010	James Brokenshire	Conservative
2021 by-election	Louie French	Conservative

== Elections ==
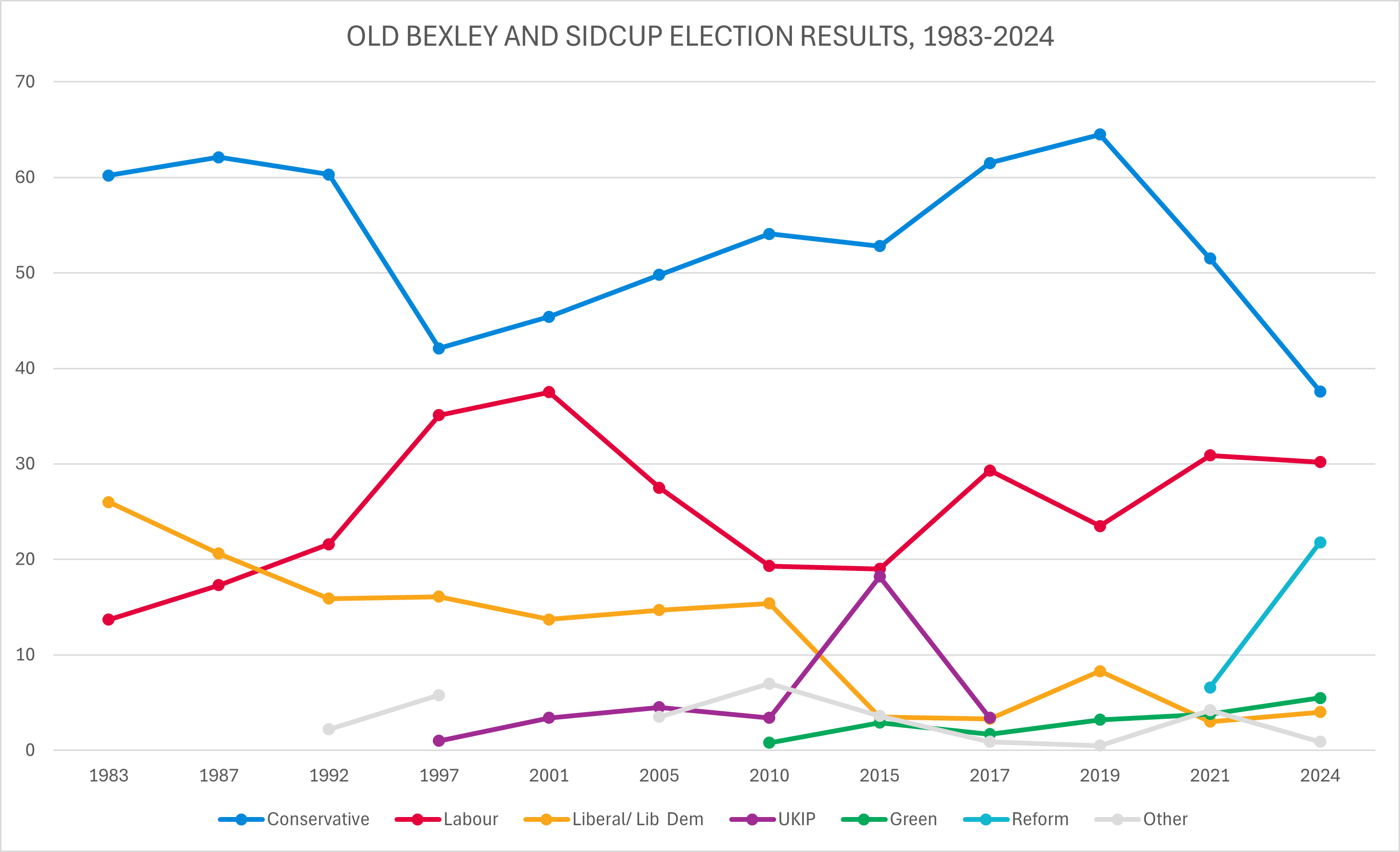
Election results 1983–2024

=== Elections in the 2020s ===
General election 2024: Old Bexley and Sidcup
Party	Candidate	Votes	%	±%
Conservative	Louie French	17,910	37.6	−26.3
Labour	Edward Jones	14,362	30.2	+6.3
Reform	Maxine Fothergill	10,384	21.8	N/A
Green	Brad Davies	2,601	5.5	+2.0
Liberal Democrats	Adrian Hyyrylainen-Trett	1,927	4.0	−4.3
Rejoin EU	Laurent Williams	251	0.5	N/A
Independent	Andrew Still	198	0.4	N/A
Majority		3,548	7.4	−32.6
Turnout		47,633	65.9	−3.9
Registered electors		72,290		
Conservative hold		Swing	−16.3	

By-election 2021: Old Bexley and Sidcup
Party	Candidate	Votes	%	±%
Conservative	Louie French	11,189	51.5	−13.0
Labour	Daniel Francis	6,711	30.9	+7.4
Reform	Richard Tice	1,432	6.6	N/A
Green	Jonathan Rooks	830	3.8	+0.6
Liberal Democrats	Simone Reynolds	647	3.0	−5.3
English Democrat	Elaine Cheeseman	271	1.3	N/A
UKIP	John Poynton	184	0.8	N/A
Rejoin EU	Richard Hewison	151	0.7	N/A
Heritage	David Kurten	116	0.5	N/A
CPA	Carol Valinejad	108	0.5	0.0
Monster Raving Loony	Mad Mike Young	94	0.4	N/A
Majority		4,478	20.6	−20.4
Turnout		21,733	33.5	−36.3
Registered electors		64,831		
Conservative hold		Swing	−10.2	

=== Elections in the 2010s ===
2019 notional result
Party	Vote	%
Conservative	33,158	63.9
Labour	12,389	23.9
Liberal Democrats	4,303	8.3
Green	1,791	3.5
Others	226	0.4
Turnout	51,867	69.8
Electorate	74,317	

General election 2019: Old Bexley and Sidcup
Party	Candidate	Votes	%	±%
Conservative	James Brokenshire	29,786	64.5	+3.1
Labour	Dave Tingle	10,834	23.5	−5.8
Liberal Democrats	Simone Reynolds	3,822	8.3	+5.0
Green	Matt Browne	1,477	3.2	+1.5
CPA	Carol Valinejad	226	0.5	+0.3
Majority		18,952	41.0	+8.8
Turnout		46,145	69.8	−3.0
Registered electors		66,104		
Conservative hold		Swing	+4.4	

General election 2017: Old Bexley and Sidcup
Party	Candidate	Votes	%	±%
Conservative	James Brokenshire	29,545	61.5	+8.7
Labour	Danny Hackett	14,079	29.3	+10.3
UKIP	Freddy Vachha	1,619	3.4	−14.9
Liberal Democrats	Drew Heffernan	1,572	3.3	−0.2
Green	Derek Moran	820	1.7	−1.2
BNP	Michael Jones	324	0.7	+0.2
CPA	Chinwe Nwadikeduruibe	83	0.2	N/A
Majority		15,466	32.2	−1.6
Turnout		48,042	72.8	+2.0
Registered electors		66,005		
Conservative hold		Swing	−0.8	

General election 2015: Old Bexley and Sidcup
Party	Candidate	Votes	%	±%
Conservative	James Brokenshire	24,682	52.8	−1.3
Labour	Ibby Mehmet	8,879	19.0	−0.3
UKIP	Catherine Reilly	8,528	18.2	+14.9
Liberal Democrats	Jennifer Keen	1,644	3.5	−11.9
Green	Derek Moran	1,336	2.9	+2.0
NHA	Bob Gill	1,216	2.6	N/A
Christian	Laurence Williams	245	0.5	N/A
BNP	Nicola Finch	218	0.5	−4.2
Majority		15,803	33.8	−1.1
Turnout		46,748	70.8	+1.5
Registered electors		66,035		
Conservative hold		Swing	−0.5	

General election 2010: Old Bexley and Sidcup
Party	Candidate	Votes	%	±%
Conservative	James Brokenshire	24,625	54.1	+4.1
Labour	Rick Everitt	8,768	19.3	−8.7
Liberal Democrats	Duncan Borrowman	6,996	15.4	+1.5
BNP	John Brooks	2,132	4.7	+1.8
UKIP	David Coburn	1,532	3.4	−1.2
English Democrat	Elaine Cheeseman	520	1.1	N/A
Independents to save Queen Mary’s Hospital	John Hemming-Clark	393	0.9	N/A
Green	Jonathan Rooks	371	0.8	N/A
Monster Raving Loony	Napoleon Dynamite	155	0.3	N/A
Majority		15,857	34.9	+12.6
Turnout		45,492	69.3	+4.0
Registered electors		65,699		
Conservative hold		Swing	+6.4	

=== Elections in the 2000s ===
General election 2005: Old Bexley and Sidcup
Party	Candidate	Votes	%	±%
Conservative	Derek Conway	22,191	49.8	+4.4
Labour	Gavin Moore	12,271	27.5	−10.0
Liberal Democrats	Nick O'Hare	6,564	14.7	+1.0
UKIP	Michael Barnbrook	2,015	4.5	+1.1
BNP	Claire Sayers	1,227	2.8	N/A
Independent	Gregory Peters	304	0.7	N/A
Majority		9,920	22.3	+14.4
Turnout		44,572	65.3	+3.2
Registered electors		68,226		
Conservative hold		Swing	+7.2	

General election 2001: Old Bexley and Sidcup
Party	Candidate	Votes	%	±%
Conservative	Derek Conway	19,130	45.4	+3.3
Labour	Jim Dickson	15,785	37.5	+2.4
Liberal Democrats	Belinda Ford	5,792	13.7	−2.4
UKIP	Janice Cronin	1,426	3.4	+2.4
Majority		3,345	7.9	+0.9
Turnout		42,133	62.1	−13.4
Registered electors		67,841		
Conservative hold		Swing	+0.5	

=== Elections in the 1990s ===
General election 1997: Old Bexley and Sidcup
Party	Candidate	Votes	%	±%
Conservative	Edward Heath	21,608	42.1	−18.3
Labour	Richard Justham	18,039	35.1	+13.5
Liberal Democrats	Iain King	8,284	16.1	+0.2
Referendum	Brian Reading	2,457	4.8	N/A
UKIP	C. Bullen	489	1.0	N/A
BNP	Valerie Tyndall	415	0.8	N/A
Natural Law	Robert Stephens	99	0.2	−0.2
Majority		3,569	7.0	−31.8
Turnout		51,391	75.5	−6.5
Registered electors		68,079		
Conservative hold		Swing	−14.1	

General election 1992: Old Bexley and Sidcup
Party	Candidate	Votes	%	±%
Conservative	Edward Heath	24,450	60.3	−1.8
Labour	Donna Brierly	8,751	21.6	+4.3
Liberal Democrats	David J. Nicolle	6,438	15.9	−4.7
Independent	Barry Rose	733	1.8	N/A
Natural Law	Robert Stephens	148	0.4	N/A
Majority		15,699	38.7	−2.8
Turnout		40,520	81.9	+4.8
Registered electors		49,449		
Conservative hold		Swing	−1.4	

=== Elections in the 1980s ===
General election 1987: Old Bexley and Sidcup
Party	Candidate	Votes	%	±%
Conservative	Edward Heath	24,350	62.1	+1.9
Liberal	Thomas Pearce	8,076	20.6	−5.4
Labour	Howard Stoate	6,762	17.3	+3.6
Majority		16,274	41.5	+7.3
Turnout		39,188	77.1	+2.9
Registered electors		50,831		
Conservative hold		Swing	+3.7	

General election 1983: Old Bexley and Sidcup
Party	Candidate	Votes	%	±%
Conservative	Edward Heath	22,442	60.2	
Liberal	Peter Vickers	9,704	26.0	
Labour	Chris Kiff	5,116	13.7	
Majority		12,738	34.2	
Turnout		37,262	74.2	
Registered electors		50,255		
Conservative win (new seat)				

== See also ==
- List of parliamentary constituencies in London

Parliament of the United Kingdom
Preceded by Castle Point	Constituency represented by the father of the House; 1992–2001	Succeeded by Linlithgow
