= Crayford (ward) =

Electoral ward

- Electoral ward for the Bexley London Borough Council
- Crayford ward boundaries since 2018
- Borough: Bexley
- County: Greater London
- Population: 16,281 (2021)

Current electoral ward
- Created: 1964 (Note: Ward named Crayford Town from 1964 to 1978)
- Number of members: 3
- Councillors: Sandra Cerisola; Debbie Ryan; Oke Ene
- GSS code: E05000071; (2002–2018); E05011222 (2018–present)

Crayford, named Crayford Town until 1978, is an electoral ward in the London Borough of Bexley established in 1964. It returns three councillors to Bexley London Borough Council.

== List of councillors ==
*councillors classified as one, two, and three are in no particular order.

Election	Councillor one*		Councillor two		Councillor three	
2026	Ref	Sandra Cerisola	Ref	Debbie Ryan	Ref	Oke Ene
2022	Con	Melvin Seymour	Con	Geraldine Lucia-Hennis	Con	Felix Di Netimah (Note: Leaves the Conservative group in April 2023.)
2018 (Note: Boundaries redrawn for the 2018 election.)	Con	Melvin Seymour	Con	Geraldine Lucia-Hennis	Con	Christine Bishop
2014	Con	John Davey	Con	Geraldine Lucia-Hennis	Con	Christine Bishop
2010	Con	Melvin Seymour	Con	Geraldine Lucia-Hennis	Con	Eileen Pallen
2006	Con	Melvin Seymour	Con	Geraldine Lucia-Hennis	Con	Howard Marinner
2002 (Note: Boundaries redrawn for the 2002 election.)	Lab	John Shepheard (Note: Elected at the 1980 by-election.)	Lab	Tonya Kelsey	Lab	Trevor Perrin
1998	Lab	John Shepheard	Lab	Tonya Kelsey	Lab	Trevor Perrin
1994	Lab	John Shepheard	Lab	R. Allen	Lab	J. Wood
1990	Lab	John Shepheard	Lab	R. Allen	Lab	June McKay (Note: Elected at the 1988 by-election.)
1988 by	Lab	John Shepheard	Lab	R. Allen	Lab	June McKay
1986	Lab	John Shepheard	Lab	R. Allen	Lab	R. Penton
1982	Lab	John Shepheard	Lab	A. Turner	Lab	R. Penton
1980 by	Lab	John Shepheard	Lab	A. Turner	Lab	R. Penton
1978 (Note: Boundaries redrawn for the 1978 election. Ward renamed to Crayford.)	Lab	B. Kemp	Lab	A. Turner	Lab	R. Penton
1974	Lab	L. Francis	Lab	A. Turner	Lab	H. Sutton
1971	Lab	L. Francis	Lab	A. Turner	Lab	H. Sutton
1968	Con	C. Pollock	Con	S. Woolterton	Con	B. Freeman
1964	Lab	J. Kerr	Lab	A. Turner	Lab	E. White

The longest serving councillor was John Shepheard (1980–2006) who served 26 years. The second longest is Geraldine Lucia-Harris (2006–2026), serving 20 years, and the third longest was A. Turner (1964–1968, 1971–1986) serving 19 years non-consecutively if you include Crayford Town, or Melvin Seymour (2006–2014, 2018–2026) serving 16 years non-consecutively if you don't include Crayford Town.

== Bexley council elections (2018–present) ==
The boundaries for Bexley wards were last redrawn in 2018. Currently, Crayford ward consists of Crayford and Barnes Cray. The ward is centered on the river Cray which enters from the south west at Hall Place gardens and exits the ward just before Crayford Marshes in the north east. Major local roads include Crayford Way, Perry Street (making up a portion of the north west boundary), Mayplace Road East extending the ward northwest in a panhandle connecting to Barnehurst, and the A206 (where Thames Road makes up a portion of the north east boundary) which exits the ward via Northend Road going to Erith. Gravel Hill (A220) forms the boundary in the southwest. From Crayford city centre, London Road and then Watling Street forms the route to Bexleyheath to the north west, Bourne Road (A223) forms the route to Old Bexley to the south west, and Crayford and then Dartford Road forms the route to Dartford, Kent to the east.

The population of the ward at the 2021 census was 16,281.

=== 2022 election ===
The election on 5 May 2022 took place on the same day as the United Kingdom local elections.

2022 Bexley London Borough Council election: Crayford
Party	Candidate	Votes	%	±%
Conservative	Melvin Seymour*	1,890	55.5	▲5.0
Conservative	Geraldine Lucia-Hennis*	1,872	55.0	▲5.6
Conservative	Felix Di Netimah	1,717	50.5	
Labour	Abi Johnson	1,628	47.8	
Labour	Anthony Riches	1,554	45.7	
Labour	Nick Hair	1,549	45.5	
Turnout		10,210	32.6	−2.54
Conservative hold		Swing		
Conservative hold		Swing		
Conservative hold		Swing		

=== 2018 election ===
The election took place on 3 May 2018.

2018 Bexley London Borough Council election: Crayford
Party	Candidate	Votes	%	±%
Conservative	Melvin Seymour	1,958	50.5	
Conservative	Geraldine Lucia-Hennis	1,918	49.4	▲2.8
Conservative	Christine Bishop	1,896	48.9	▲2.3
Labour	Anna Day	1,489	38.4	
Labour	Elizabeth Folarin	1,270	32.7	
Labour	Munir Malik	1,254	32.3	
UKIP	Keith Forster	460	11.9	
Liberal Democrats	Sean Michael Peter Ash	375	9.7	
Turnout		3,902	35.1	
Conservative hold		Swing		
Conservative hold		Swing		
Conservative hold		Swing		

== Bexley council elections (2002–2018) ==
Crayford ward boundaries from 2002 to 2018

The ward boundaries were redrawn in 2002 and used until 2018.

=== 2014 election ===
The election took place on 22 May 2014.

2014 Bexley London Borough Council election: Crayford
Party	Candidate	Votes	%	±%
Conservative	Christine Bishop	1,575	46.6	▲9.0
Conservative	Geraldine Lucia-Hennis	1,547		
Conservative	John Davey	1,466		
Labour	John Shepheard	1,266	37.5	▲12.0
Labour	Alexis Chase	1,161		
Labour	Wendy Perfect	1,126		
BNP	Stephen James	539	15.9	▲4.6
Turnout		2,894	37.6	–16.4
Conservative hold		Swing		
Conservative hold		Swing		
Conservative hold		Swing		

=== 2010 election ===
The election took place on 6 May 2010.

2010 Bexley London Borough Council election: Crayford
Party	Candidate	Votes	%	±%
Conservative	Geraldene Lucia-Hennis	2,355	37.6	▲1.1
Conservative	Melvin Seymour	2,220		
Conservative	Eileen Pallen	2,069		
Labour	Tonya Kelsey	1,599	25.5	▼5.8
Labour	John Shepheard	1,560		
Labour	Trevor Perrin	1,418		
Liberal Democrats	Andrew Fowler	1,040	16.6	▲5.2
BNP	Stephen James	710	11.3	▼9.5
English Democrat	Maggi Young	562	9.0	New
Turnout			54.0	+11.7
Conservative hold		Swing		
Conservative hold		Swing		
Conservative hold		Swing		

=== 2006 election ===
The election took place on 4 May 2006.

2006 Bexley London Borough Council election: Crayford
Party	Candidate	Votes	%	±%
Conservative	Geraldene Lucia-Hennis	1,378	36.5	▲0.5
Conservative	Howard Marriner	1,345		
Conservative	Melvin Seymour	1,286		
Labour	John Shepheard	1,180	31.3	▼18.0
Labour	Tonya Kelsey	1,147		
Labour	Trevor Perrin	1,058		
BNP	Stephen James	786	20.8	▲13.3
Liberal Democrats	Amanda Buckley	430	11.4	New
Turnout			42.3	+12.9
Conservative gain from Labour		Swing		
Conservative gain from Labour		Swing		
Conservative gain from Labour		Swing		

=== 2002 election ===
The election took place on 2 May 2002.

2002 Bexley London Borough Council election: Crayford
Party	Candidate	Votes	%	±%
Labour	John Shepheard	1,132	49.3	▼5.2
Labour	Tonya Kelsey	1,078		
Labour	Trevor Perrin	1,024		
Conservative	Robert Stead	828	36.0	▲6.1
Conservative	Daisy Clement	808		
Conservative	Bernard Clewes	801		
BNP	John Bowles	173	7.5	▲3.4
UKIP	Kevin Cronin	164	7.1	New
Turnout			29.4	
Labour hold		Swing		
Labour hold		Swing		
Labour hold		Swing		

== Bexley council elections (1978–2002) ==
Crayford ward boundaries from 1978 to 2002

The ward was created in 1978, and the boundaries were used until 2002.

=== 1998 election ===
The election took place on 7 May 1998.

1998 Bexley London Borough Council election: Crayford
Party	Candidate	Votes	%	±%
Labour	John Shepheard	1,475	54.5	0.0
Labour	Tonya Kelsey	1,415		
Labour	Trevor Perrin	1,384		
Conservative	Robert Stead	809	29.9	▲0.3
Conservative	M. Reeve	753		
Conservative	Daisy Clement	746		
Liberal Democrats	J. Cudmore	312	11.5	▼4.3
Liberal Democrats	W. Boyd	307		
Liberal Democrats	A. Rigby	245		
BNP	C. Smith	112	4.1	New
BNP	S. Turner	97		
Turnout		8,582	39.9	–7.2
Labour hold		Swing		
Labour hold		Swing		
Labour hold		Swing		

=== 1994 election ===
The election took place on 5 May 1994.

1994 Bexley London Borough Council election: Crayford
Party	Candidate	Votes	%	±%
Labour	Raymond C. Allen	2,093	54.5	▲2.4
Labour	John D. Shepheard	2,055		
Labour	June Wood	1,896		
Conservative	David K. Gleed	1,197	29.6	▼8.1
Conservative	Shirley J. Vick	1,053		
Conservative	Rosemary W. White	1,037		
Liberal Democrats	Roger K. Pryor	624	15.8	▲5.5
Liberal Democrats	Benjamin M. Hepworth	601		
Liberal Democrats	Agnes Rigby	532		
Registered electors		8,638		
Turnout		4,072	47.1	
Labour hold		Swing		
Labour hold		Swing		
Labour hold		Swing		

=== 1990 election ===
1990 Bexley London Borough Council election: Crayford (3)
Party	Candidate	Votes	%	±%
Labour	R. Allen*	2,123	52.1	▲7.1
Labour	J. Shepheard*	1,991		
Labour	Ms. J. McKay	1,913		
Conservative	Ms. M. Wiltshire	1,535	37.7	▲3.9
Conservative	D. French	1,491		
Conservative	Ms. D. Clement	1,466		
SDP	Ms. P. Holman	419	10.3	▼10.9
Turnout		TBD	47.3	
Labour hold		Swing		
Labour hold		Swing		
Labour hold		Swing		

=== 1988 by-election ===
Crayford by-election, 5 May 1988
Party	Candidate	Votes	%
Labour	June McKay	1,457	45.77
Conservative	Daisy Clement	1,081	33.96
SDP	David Smith	645	20.26
Registered electors		9,050	
Turnout		3,183	35.18
Labour hold			

=== 1986 election ===
1986 Bexley London Borough Council election: Crayford (3)
Party	Candidate	Votes	%	±%
Labour	J. Shepheard*	1,579	45.0	▲2.6
Labour	R. Allen	1,530		
Labour	R. Penton*	1,468		
Conservative	D. French	1,187	33.8	▼1.3
Conservative	Ms. H. Cox	1,179		
Conservative	Ms. D. Clement	1,131		
Alliance	J. Saunders	746	21.2	▼1.3
Alliance	R. Hudson	683		
Alliance	Ms. C. Dimitros	666		
Turnout		TBD	42.3	
Labour hold		Swing		
Labour hold		Swing		
Labour hold		Swing		

=== 1982 election ===
1982 Bexley London Borough Council election: Crayford (3)
Party	Candidate	Votes	%	±%
Labour	A. Turner*	1,265	42.4	▼21.9
Labour	J. Shepheard	1,265		
Labour	R. Penton*	1,121		
Conservative	D. French	1,048	35.1	▼0.6
Conservative	R. Gillespie	986		
Conservative	Ms J. Todd-Dunning	971		
Alliance	M. Gardner	672	22.5	New
Alliance	J. Lee	621		
Alliance	J. Noyes	609		
Turnout		TBD	41.1	
Labour hold		Swing		
Labour hold		Swing		
Labour hold		Swing		

=== 1980 by-election ===
Crayford by-election, 22 May 1980
Party	Candidate	Votes	%
Labour	John Shepheard	1,571	65.79
Conservative	Helga Connors	671	28.10
Ecology	Bernard Morris	94	3.94
NNF	Peter Skelton	52	2.18
Registered electors		7,770	
Turnout		2,388	30.73
Labour hold			

=== 1978 election ===
1978 Bexley London Borough Council election: Crayford (3)
Party	Candidate	Votes	%	±%
Labour	A. Turner*	1,799	64.3	▼4.0
Labour	B. Kemp	1,721		
Labour	R. Penton	1,591		
Conservative	J. Taylor	1,000	35.7	▲4.0
Conservative	D. French	995		
Conservative	A. Smith	993		
Turnout		TBD	40.1	
Labour hold		Swing		
Labour hold		Swing		
Labour hold		Swing		

== Bexley council elections (1964–1978) ==
During this period, the ward was known as Crayford Town.

Three wards were drawn out of the Crayford Urban District which had been absorbed into the London Borough of Bexley in 1965: Crayford West which included Barnehurst, Crayford North which included Slade Green, and Crayford Town which included Crayford itself. The river Cray enters from the south west at the eastern-most fringes of Hall Place gardens, the majority of which were in Upton, and exits beneath the North Kent Line as it begins to comprise the Greater London–Kent boundary. The ward's boundaries are very similar to the modern Crayford ward with some border anomalies such as cutting Perry Street in half and the inclusion of just some parts of London Road (Watling Street) and Bourne Road but not all of it.

=== 1974 election ===
Crayford Town (3)
Party	Candidate	Votes	%	±%
Labour	A. Turner*	1,377	68.3	▼7.2
Labour	H. Sutton*	1,335		
Labour	L. Francis*	1,293		
Conservative	K. Roberts	639	31.7	▲7.2
Conservative	J. Swallow	597		
Conservative	R. Gillespie	597		
Turnout		TBD	28.0	
Labour hold		Swing		
Labour hold		Swing		
Labour hold		Swing		

=== 1971 election ===
Crayford Town (3)
Party	Candidate	Votes	%	±%
Labour	H. Sutton	2,444	75.5	▲29.1
Labour	A. Turner	2,420		
Labour	L. Francis	2,388		
Conservative	C. Pollock*	793	24.5	▼23.7
Conservative	S. Woolterton*	767		
Conservative	L. Belcham	757		
Turnout		TBD	44.8	
Labour gain from Conservative		Swing		
Labour gain from Conservative		Swing		
Labour gain from Conservative		Swing		

=== 1968 election ===
Crayford Town (3)
Party	Candidate	Votes	%	±%
Conservative	C. Pollock	1,411	48.2	New
Conservative	S. Woolterton	1,396		
Conservative	B. Freeman	1,364		
Labour	A. Turner*	1360	46.4	▼29.2
Labour	Ms. M. Bradley	1337		
Labour	L. Francis	1309		
Independent	P. Blunt	157	5.4	New
Turnout		TBD	41.7	
Conservative gain from Labour		Swing		
Conservative gain from Labour		Swing		
Conservative gain from Labour		Swing		

=== 1964 election ===
Crayford Town (3)
Party	Candidate	Votes	%	±%
Labour	J. Kerr	2,155	75.6	
Labour	Mrs. E. White	2,118		
Labour	A. Turner	2,110		
Liberal	J. S. Lacey	694	24.4	
Liberal	P. A. Bawcutt	680		
Liberal	M. A. Green	659		
Turnout		2,888	41.2	
Labour win (new seat)				
Labour win (new seat)				
Labour win (new seat)				
