= West Heath (ward) =

Electoral ward in Bexley, London, England

- Electoral ward for the Bexley London Borough Council
- West Heath ward boundaries
- Borough: Bexley
- County: Greater London
- Population: 15,936 (2021)
- Electorate: 11,710 (2026)
- Major settlements: West Heath
- Area: 2.796 square kilometres (1.080 sq mi)

Current electoral ward
- Created: 2018
- Number of members: 3
- Councillors: Thomas Clapperton; Eliot Smith; Sue Ford
- Created from: Belvedere; Brampton; Lesnes Abbey; Northumberland Heath; St Michael's
- GSS code: E05011233

West Heath is an electoral ward in the London Borough of Bexley. The ward was first used in the 2018 elections. It elects three councillors to Bexley London Borough Council.

== List of councillors ==
| Seat | Councillor | Took office | Left office | Party | Election |
|---|---|---|---|---|---|
| 1 | Peter Reader | 2018 | 2026 | Conservative | 2018, 2022 |
| 2 | John Davey | 2018 | 2026 | Conservative | 2018, 2022 |
| 3 | Phillip Read | 2018 | 2026 | Conservative | 2018, 2022 |
| 1 | Thomas Clapperton | 2026 | Incumbent | Conservative | 2026 |
| 2 | Eliot Smith | 2026 | Incumbent | Conservative | 2026 |
| 3 | Sue Ford | 2026 | Incumbent | Reform | 2026 |

== Summary ==
Councillors elected by party at each general borough election.

- Conservative
- Reform

== Bexley council elections ==
=== 2026 election ===
The election took place on 7 May 2026.

2026 Bexley London Borough Council election: West Heath
| Party | Candidate | Votes | % | ±% |
|---|---|---|---|---|
| Conservative | Thomas Clapperton | 2,329 | 40.0 | ▼19.3 |
| Conservative | Eliot Smith | 2,198 | 37.8 | |
| Reform | Sue Ford | 2,130 | 36.6 | New |
| Conservative | Melvin Seymour | 2121 | 36.4 | |
| Reform | Ian Rowlands | 2010 | 34.5 | |
| Reform | David Simmons | 2006 | 34.5 | |
| Labour | Ahmad Brooke | 1207 | 20.7 | ▼22.3 |
| Labour | Katty Sillah | 1176 | 20.2 | |
| Labour | Ray Williams | 1076 | 18.5 | |
| Green | Stuart Carter | 795 | 13.7 | New |
| Liberal Democrats | Andrew Kellett | 412 | 7.1 | New |
| Turnout | | 17,460 | | |
| Conservative hold | | Swing | | |
| Conservative hold | | Swing | | |
| Reform gain from Conservative | | Swing | | |

=== 2022 election ===
The election took place on 5 May 2022.

2022 Bexley London Borough Council election: West Heath
| Party | Candidate | Votes | % | ±% |
|---|---|---|---|---|
| Conservative | Peter Reader | 2,389 | 59.3 | +0.6 |
| Conservative | John Davey | 2,328 | 57.8 | +1.3 |
| Conservative | Philip Read | 2,283 | 56.7 | +1.5 |
| Labour | Sam Marchant | 1,730 | 43.0 | |
| Labour | Jay Dominy | 1,678 | 41.7 | |
| Labour | Victoria Akintomide-Akinwamide | 1,669 | 41.5 | |
| Turnout | | 12,077 | 36.0 | −4.69 |
| Conservative hold | | Swing | | |
| Conservative hold | | Swing | | |
| Conservative hold | | Swing | | |

=== 2018 election ===
The election took place on 3 May 2018.

2018 Bexley London Borough Council election: West Heath
| Party | Candidate | Votes | % | ±% |
|---|---|---|---|---|
| Conservative | Peter Reader | 2,831 | 58.7 | |
| Conservative | John Davey | 2,726 | 56.5 | |
| Conservative | Phillip Read | 2,663 | 55.2 | |
| Labour | Ian McCawley | 1,639 | 34.0 | |
| Labour | Ade Osayomi | 1,361 | 28.2 | |
| Labour | Folasade Oduja | 1,324 | 27.5 | |
| UKIP | Steve Reader | 438 | 9.1 | |
| Liberal Democrats | Stuart Weedon | 390 | 8.1 | |
| Turnout | | 4,854 | 40.7 | |
| Conservative win (new seat) | | | | |
| Conservative win (new seat) | | | | |
| Conservative win (new seat) | | | | |
