= Bexley London Borough Council elections =

Class of UK elections

A map showing the wards of Bexley from 2002 to 2018

Bexley London Borough Council is the local authority for the London Borough of Bexley in London, England. The council is elected every four years.

== Council elections ==
The first elections to the council were held in 1964, initially operating as a shadow authority until the new system came into effect the following year. Political control of the council since 1964 has been held by the following parties:

Election	Overall control	Conservative	Labour	Lib Dem	Ind.	UKIP	Ref
1964	Labour	17	39	-	-	-	-
1968	Conservative	55	-	-	1	-	-
1971	Labour	24	32	-	-	-	-
1974 (Note: Boundary changes increased the number of seats by three.)	Conservative	37	22	-	-	-	-
1978 (Note: Boundary changes increased the number of seats by three.)	Conservative	43	18	-	1	-	-
1982	Conservative	41	14	7	-	-	-
1986	Conservative	36	15	11	-	-	-
1990	Conservative	35	18	9	-	-	-
1994 (Note: Boundary changes took place but the number of seats remained the same. (Note: The Greater London and Kent (County Boundaries) Order 1992) (Note: The Bexley and Greenwich (London Borough Boundaries) Order 1993) (Note: The Greater London, Kent and Surrey (County Boundaries) Order 1993))	No overall control	24	24	14	-	-	-
1998	Conservative	32	24	6	-	-	-
2002 (Note: Boundary changes increased the number of seats by one.)	Labour	30	32	1	-	-	-
2006	Conservative	54	9	-	-	-	-
2010	Conservative	52	11	-	-	-	-
2014	Conservative	45	15	-	-	3	-
2018 (Note: Boundary changes decreased the number of seats by 18.)	Conservative	34	11	-	-	-	-
2022	Conservative	33	12	-	-	-	-
2026	Conservative	29	9	-	-	-	7

== Borough result maps ==
1964 results map

1968 results map

1971 results map

1978 results map

1982 results map

1986 results map

1990 results map

2002 results map

2006 results map

2010 results map

2014 results map

2018 results map

2022 results map

2026 results map

== By-election results ==
=== 1964–1968 ===
There were no by-elections.

=== 1968–1971 ===
Danson by-election, 3 October 1968
Party	Candidate	Votes	%
Conservative	B. J. Illsley	1,603	
Labour	S. J. Cooper	1,121	
Turnout			34.3%

Upton by-election, 24 April 1969
Party	Candidate	Votes	%
Conservative	L. S. Newton	1,365	
Labour	J. R. Beach	467	
Liberal	A. Newman	356	
Turnout			36.3%

Northumberland Heath by-election, 12 June 1969
Party	Candidate	Votes	%
Conservative	D. C. Bale	1,866	
Labour	E. Handy	1,177	
Turnout			38.9%

Sidcup West by-election, 2 October 1969
Party	Candidate	Votes	%
Conservative	B. H. Williams	1,306	
Labour	C. F. Hargrave	480	
Liberal	L. W. Rogers	473	
Turnout			31.9%

Crayford West by-election, 4 December 1969
Party	Candidate	Votes	%
Conservative	G. H. S. Mead	1,029	
Labour	K. J. Smith	470	
Liberal	A. Newman	199	
National Front	C. Lane	99	
Turnout			32.6%

Belvedere by-election, 5 March 1970
Party	Candidate	Votes	%
Labour	S. E. Gadsdon	1,185	
Conservative	D. J. Hague	1,094	
National Front	J. D. Turner	156	
Turnout			25.5%

Christchurch by-election, 23 July 1970
Party	Candidate	Votes	%
Conservative	A. L. O. Jamieson-Harvey	1,358	
Labour	D. C. Lebar	573	
National Front	J. D. Turner	66	
Turnout			24.6%

Crayford North by-election, 23 July 1970
Party	Candidate	Votes	%
Labour	P. S. Maxwell	2,317	
Conservative	R. D. P. Green	1,148	
National Front	C. Lane	90	
Turnout			34.3%

=== 1971–1974 ===
Crayford West by-election, 4 May 1972
Party	Candidate	Votes	%
Conservative	J. Connors	1,356	
Labour	V. A. M. Morgan	905	
Turnout			40.2%

East Wickham by-election, 20 July 1972
Party	Candidate	Votes	%
Labour	D. A. Condon	1,334	
Conservative	J. Holden	1,221	
National Front	J. D. Turner	89	
Communist	W. E. Turner	54	
Turnout			32.6%

Danson by-election, 17 May 1973
Party	Candidate	Votes	%
Liberal	C. E. Wright	1,107	
Conservative	G. A. Griffin	973	
Labour	P. M. Cooper	897	
Independent	R. R. Tregunno	334	
Turnout			42.7%

=== 1974–1978 ===
Lamorbey West by-election, 20 February 1975
Party	Candidate	Votes	%
Conservative	Ronald Passey	1,475	
Labour	Laurence Earney	1,276	
Liberal	David Browne	588	
National Front	Owen Hawke	144	
Turnout			34.4

Thamesmead East by-election, 3 July 1975
Party	Candidate	Votes	%
Labour	Anthony West	838	
Conservative	Ralph Walden-Kaye	279	
National Front	Barry Draper	157	
Turnout			20.7

Brampton by-election, 28 October 1976
Party	Candidate	Votes	%
Conservative	Stephen Gasche	1,434	
Labour	Alan Scutt	736	
Liberal	Keith Lepla	338	
National Party	James Turner	227	
National Front	Patricia Whitefield	213	
Independent	William Turner	65	
Independent	Harry Wilson	26	
Turnout			37.3

Christchurch by-election, 28 October 1976
Party	Candidate	Votes	%
Conservative	Barbara Brooks	1,135	
Labour	Brian Oliver	419	
Liberal	Benjamin Hepworth	411	
National Front	Owen Hawke	172	
National Party	Carl Lane	149	
Turnout			29.0

Brampton by-election, 22 September 1977
Party	Candidate	Votes	%
Conservative	David Crowson	999	
Labour	Alan Scutt	753	
Liberal	Bruce Taylor	324	
National Front	Patricia Whitefield	181	
Against Higher Prices, Rates, Interest Charges	William Turner	62	
Turnout			28.5

=== 1978–1982 ===
Brampton by-election, 27 September 1979
Party	Candidate	Votes	%
Conservative	Ronald Onley	1,096	42.68
Labour	Ronald Brierly	1,073	41.78
Liberal	Paul Robson	296	11.53
Against Wealth Extremes Marxist Maoist Leninist	William Turner	53	2.06
National Front	Owen Hawke	50	1.95
Registered electors		8,114	
Turnout		2,568	31.65
Conservative hold			

The by-election was called following the resignation of Councillor Gasche.

St Michael's by-election, 27 March 1980
Party	Candidate	Votes	%
Labour	Harold Davis	1,431	41.74
Conservative	Donald Stephens	1,017	29.67
Liberal	Thomas Brady	880	25.67
NNF	Peter Skelton	57	1.66
Against Wealth Extremes Marxist Maoist Leninist	William Turner	43	1.25
Registered electors		7,935	
Turnout		3,428	43.20
Labour gain from Conservative			

The by-election was called following the death of Councillor Smerdon.

Crayford by-election, 22 May 1980
Party	Candidate	Votes	%
Labour	John Shepheard	1,571	65.79
Conservative	Helga Connors	671	28.10
Ecology	Bernard Morris	94	3.94
NNF	Peter Skelton	52	2.18
Registered electors		7,770	
Turnout		2,388	30.73
Labour hold			

The by-election was called following the resignation of Councillor Kemp.

North End by-election, 26 June 1980
Party	Candidate	Votes	%
Labour	David Ives	1,920	79.40
Conservative	Dorothy Cox	327	13.52
Ecology	Derek Davison	108	4.47
NNF	Owen Hawke	62	2.56
Registered electors		7,869	
Turnout		2,418	30.72
Labour hold			

The by-election was called following the resignation of Councillor Smith.

Blackfen by-election, 22 January 1981
Party	Candidate	Votes	%
Labour	Ronald O'Donnell	870	41.75
Conservative	Alan Godsave	705	33.83
Liberal	William Boyd	483	23.18
NFCM	Alan Wilkens	26	1.25
Registered electors		5,231	
Turnout		2,084	39.84
Labour gain from Conservative			

The by-election was called following the death of Councillor James

St Michael's by-election, 26 February 1981
Party	Candidate	Votes	%
Liberal FT	Thomas Brady	1,778	55.37
Labour	Ronald Brierly	724	22.55
Conservative	Donald Stephens	638	19.87
Centre Party	Donald Price	41	1.28
Nationalist Party	Owen Hawke	23	0.72
Against Wealth Extremes Marxist Maoist Leninist	William Turner	7	0.22
Registered electors		8,164	
Turnout		3,211	39.33

The by-election was called following the death of Councillor Redmond Dill

=== 1982–1986 ===
Thameshead East by-election, 28 April 1983
Party	Candidate	Votes	%
Labour	Michael Rees	975	40.81
Alliance	Thomas Johnson	726	30.39
Conservative	Brenda Hunt	688	28.80
Registered electors		7,826	
Turnout		2,389	30.53
Labour hold			

The by-election was called following the resignation of Councillor West

East Wickham by-election, 21 March 1985
Party	Candidate	Votes	%
Alliance	Keith Lepla	1,592	56.52
Alliance	Colin Wright	1,548	
Labour	Raymond Morley	608	21.38
Conservative	Stephen O'Brien	589	21.02
Labour	Eileen Donovan	580	
Conservative	Eileen Donovan	578	
Marxist Leninist Maoist for Wealth Equality	William Turner	30	1.08
Registered electors		8,598	
Turnout			33.4
Alliance gain from Conservative			
Alliance gain from Conservative			

The by-election was called following the resignations of Councillors Holden and Holden.

Sidcup West by-election, 21 March 1985
Party	Candidate	Votes	%
Conservative	Malcolm Ketley	1,303	54.27
Alliance	Raymond White	595	24.78
Labour	David Hinds	467	19.45
British Alliance	Arthur Allen	36	1.50
Registered electors		7,956	
Turnout		2,401	30.18
Conservative hold			

The by-election was called following the resignation of Councillor Goodall

Blendon and Penhill by-election, 9 May 1985
Party	Candidate	Votes	%
Conservative	Sean Cassidy	1,419	47.97
Alliance	Stephen Matthews	1,133	38.30
Labour	Vera Laker	406	13.73
Registered electors		7,680	
Turnout		2,958	38.52
Conservative hold			

The by-election was called following the resignation of Councillor Marchant

Bostall by-election, 11 July 1985
Party	Candidate	Votes	%
Conservative	Alfred Charlton	1,440	43.24
Alliance	Thomas Johnson	1,199	36.01
Labour Co-op	Shirley Gadson	691	20.75
Registered electors		7,707	
Turnout		3,330	43.21
Conservative hold			

The by-election was called following the death of Councillor Mason

=== 1986–1990 ===
Danson by-election, 6 November 1986
Party	Candidate	Votes	%
Liberal Alliance FT	Edward Shrimpton	1,299	49.73
Conservative	Richard Gillespie	886	33.92
Labour	Margaret Mythen	427	16.35
Registered electors		7,616	
Turnout		2,612	34.30
Liberal Alliance FT hold			

The by-election was called following the resignation of Councillor Greville

Blackfen by-election, 1 October 1987
Party	Candidate	Votes	%
Conservative	Barry Howard	704	41.79
Conservative	Margaret Passey	696	
Alliance	Stephen Matthews	671	39.34
Alliance	Michael Jaques	646	
Labour	Robert Grant	319	18.87
Labour	Geoffrey Dixon	312	
Registered electors		5,422	
Turnout			31.83
Conservative gain from Alliance			
Conservative hold			

The by-election was called following the resignations of Councillors Boyd and Rose

Bostall by-election, 1 October 1987
Party	Candidate	Votes	%
Conservative	John Wilkinson	1,184	63.42
Labour	John Barnshaw	373	19.98
Alliance	Gordon Roberts	310	16.60
Registered electors		7,699	
Turnout		1,867	24.25
Conservative hold			

The by-election was called following the death of Councillor Bale

Blendon and Penhill by-election, 5 May 1988
Party	Candidate	Votes	%
Conservative	Edward Warbey	1,587	64.04
Labour	Caron Richardson	499	20.14
Liberal Democrats	Thomas Burnham	392	15.82
Registered electors		7,725	
Turnout		2,478	32.08
Conservative hold			

The by-election was called following the resignation of Councillor Cassidy

Bostall by-election, 5 May 1988
Party	Candidate	Votes	%
Conservative	Rita Sams	1,548	57.80
Labour	John Barnshaw	725	27.07
SDP	Gordon Roberts	405	15.12
Registered electors		7,725	
Turnout		2,678	34.67
Conservative hold			

The by-election was called following the resignation of Councillor Belcham

Crayford by-election, 5 May 1988
Party	Candidate	Votes	%
Labour	June McKay	1,457	45.77
Conservative	Daisy Clement	1,081	33.96
SDP	David Smith	645	20.26
Registered electors		9,050	
Turnout		3,183	35.18
Labour hold			

The by-election was called following the resignation of Councillor Penton

Belvedere by-election, 29 September 1988
Party	Candidate	Votes	%
Labour	Geoffrey Dixon	1,308	48.25
Conservative	Daisy Clement	865	31.91
SDP	Rosemary Gardner	281	10.37
Liberal Democrats	Raymond Hudson	257	9.48
Registered electors		9,542	
Turnout		2,711	28.41
Labour hold			

The by-election was called following the resignation of Councillor Camp.

=== 1990–1994 ===
East Wickham by-election, 9 July 1992
Party	Candidate	Votes	%
Lib Dem Focus Team	Janette Codd	1,371	44.0
Labour	Stuart Slater	1,165	37.4
Conservative	John Waters	583	18.7
Turnout			36.9
Lib Dem Focus Team hold			

The by-election was called following the resignation of Councillor Le Pia.

Upton by-election, 6 May 1993
Party	Candidate	Votes	%
Labour	Sylvia Malt	1,376	39.2
Conservative	William Flint	1,271	36.2
Lib Dem Focus Team	Stuart White	867	24.7
Turnout			44.9
Labour gain from Conservative			

The by-election was called following the death of Councillor Sams.

=== 1994–1998 ===
Northumberland Heath by-election, 20 April 1995
Party	Candidate	Votes	%
Labour	Mary Lucas	1,853	63.2
Conservative	Joyce Dianne	547	18.7
Liberal Democrats	Peter Wayne	468	16.0
Independent	Ian Gray	63	2.1
Majority		1,306	44.5
Turnout		2,931	38.4
Labour hold			

The by-election was called following the death of Councillor Wheelock.

Thamesmead East by-election, 7 December 1995
Party	Candidate	Votes	%
Labour	Christopher Ball	825	67.1
Liberal Democrats	Jeremy Cotton	253	20.6
Conservative	Juliet Mankerty	151	12.3
Majority		572	46.5
Turnout		1,229	13.4
Labour hold			

The by-election was called following the death of Councillor Barratt.

Erith by-election, 5 December 1996
Party	Candidate	Votes	%
Labour	Elizabeth French	1,087	64.5
Conservative	Carol Wilkinson	340	20.2
Independent	Derek Holden	157	9.3
Liberal Democrats	Mary Cooke	102	6.0
Majority		747	44.3
Turnout		1,686	20.6
Labour hold			

The by-election was called following the resignation of Councillor Morgan.

Sidcup East by-election, 13 March 1997
Party	Candidate	Votes	%
Conservative	William Flint	1,326	40.7
Labour	Sean Reed	1,288	39.5
Liberal Democrats	Christopher Eady	333	10.2
Independent	Jean Gee	296	9.0
Natural Law	Robert Stephens	14	0.4
Majority		38	1.2
Turnout		3,257	37.8
Conservative hold			

The by-election was called following the death of Councillor Flint.

=== 1998–2002 ===
Blendon & Penhill, 25 June 1998, was not a by-election, but a postponed election from May 1998 due to the death of a nominated candidate.

North End by-election, 6 July 2000
Party	Candidate	Votes	%	±%
Labour	Alan Deadman	772	44.4	−20.5
BNP	Colin Smith	456	26.2	+26.2
Conservative	Philip Chant	413	23.7	−1.9
Liberal Democrats	Christopher Eady	99	5.7	−3.8
Majority		316	18.2	
Turnout		1,740	19.3	
Labour hold		Swing		

The by-election was called following the death of Councillor Ives.

Belvedere by-election, 28 September 2000
Party	Candidate	Votes	%	±%
Labour	Daniel Francis	1,033	55.0	+3.1
Conservative	Philip Brooks	672	35.8	+2.8
Liberal Democrats	Anthony Pickett	174	9.3	+0.0
Majority		361	19.2	
Turnout		1,879	20.1	
Labour hold		Swing		

The by-election was called following the resignation of Councillor Cameron.

=== 2002–2006 ===
There were no by-elections.

=== 2006–2010 ===
Christchurch by-election, 3 July 2008
Party	Candidate	Votes	%	±%
Conservative	James Spencer	1,192	47.8	−16.1
Liberal Democrats	Oliver Brooks	459	18.4	+3.5
BNP	Michael Barnbrook	431	17.3	+17.3
Labour	Ursula Ayliffe	411	16.5	−4.8
Majority		733	29.4	
Turnout		2,493	29.6	
Conservative hold		Swing		

The by-election was called following the resignation of Councillor Clement.

East Wickham by-election, 22 January 2009
Party	Candidate	Votes	%	±%
Conservative	Steven Hall	798	26.8	−5.2
BNP	Michael Barnbrook	790	26.5	+12.4
Labour	Patricia Ball	700	23.5	+1.5
Liberal Democrats	Elizabeth Goodlad	564	18.9	+2.9
English Democrat	Laurence Williams	128	4.3	−4.9
Majority		8		
Turnout		2,890	36.9	+1.7
Conservative hold		Swing		

The by-election was called following the death of Councillor Alfred Catterall.

=== 2010–2014 ===
There were no by-elections.

=== 2014–2018 ===
St Michael's by-election, 30 June 2016
Party	Candidate	Votes	%	±%
Conservative	Ray Sams	939	37.4	+2.7
Labour	Sam Marchant	840	33.5	−11.5
UKIP	Keith Forster	456	18.2	+14.7
Liberal Democrats	Simone Reynolds	117	4.7	N/A
BNP	Michael Jones	105	4.2	−6.3
Green	Derek Moran	54	2.2	N/A
Majority		99	3.9	
Turnout			30.3	
Conservative hold		Swing		

=== 2018–2022 ===
Longlands by-election, 6 May 2021
Party	Candidate	Votes	%	±%
Conservative	Lisa-Jane Moore	2,467	62.1	▲4.1
Labour	David Tingle	859	21.6	▼4.4
Green	Jonathon Rooks	323	8.1	▲8.1
Liberal Democrats	Paul Hurren	275	6.9	▼3.1
Heritage	Linda Purcell	49	1.3	▲1.3
Majority		1,608	40.5	▲8.5
Turnout		3,973	51.5	▲10.2
Conservative hold		Swing	▲4.3	

=== 2022–2026 ===
Belvedere by-election, 17 October 2024
Party	Candidate	Votes	%	±%
Labour	Jeremy Fosten	862	38.5	▼14.4
Conservative	Christine Bishop	713	31.9	▼1.3
Reform	Michael Pastor	378	16.9	▲16.9
Green	Sarah Barry	157	7.0	▼6.9
Liberal Democrats	David McBride	127	5.7	▲5.7
Majority		149	6.7	
Turnout		2,237		
Labour hold		Swing		
