= Bexley Council =

Bexley Council could refer to:

- Bexley City Council, Ohio
- Bexley London Borough Council, starting 1965
- Bexley Borough Council (municipal borough), England from 1935 to 1965
