= West Heath, London =

Area of London, England

Coordinates: 51.4771°N 0.1249°E

West Heath
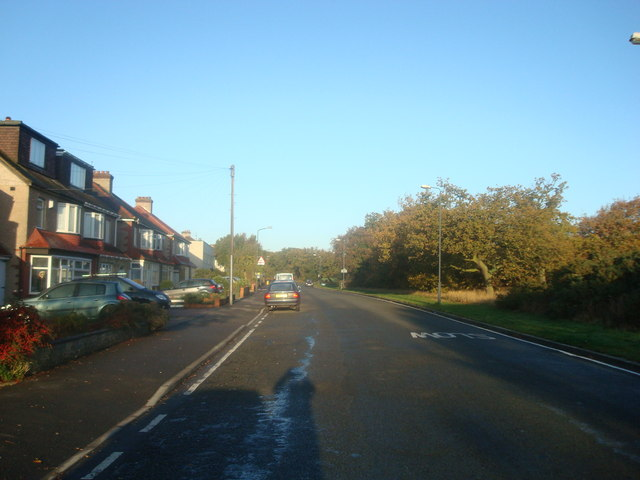
- Longleigh Road in West Heath

- Location within Greater London
- OS grid reference: TQ475775
- London borough: Bexley
- Ceremonial county: Greater London
- Region: London
- Country: England
- Sovereign state: United Kingdom
- Post town: LONDON
- Postcode district: SE2
- Post town: BEXLEYHEATH
- Postcode district: DA7
- Post town: BELVEDERE
- Postcode district: DA17
- Dialling code: 020; 01322
- Police: Metropolitan
- Fire: London
- Ambulance: London
- UK Parliament: Erith and Thamesmead
- London Assembly: Bexley and Bromley

West Heath is an area of South East London within the London Borough of Bexley. It lies south of Abbey Wood and north of Welling.

== Transport ==
West Heath is served by three Transport for London bus services that connect it with areas including Bexleyheath, Abbey Wood, Erith, Woolwich, Thamesmead and North Greenwich. The nearest rail link to the area is at Abbey Wood station.

== Politics and government ==
West Heath is part of the Erith and Thamesmead constituency for elections to the House of Commons of the United Kingdom, currently represented by Abena Oppong-Asare from the Labour Party.

West Heath is part of the West Heath ward for elections to Bexley London Borough Council.

== Notable people ==
- Samuel Hulse - lived at West Heath House.
