= Bexley Civic Offices =

Municipal building in London, England

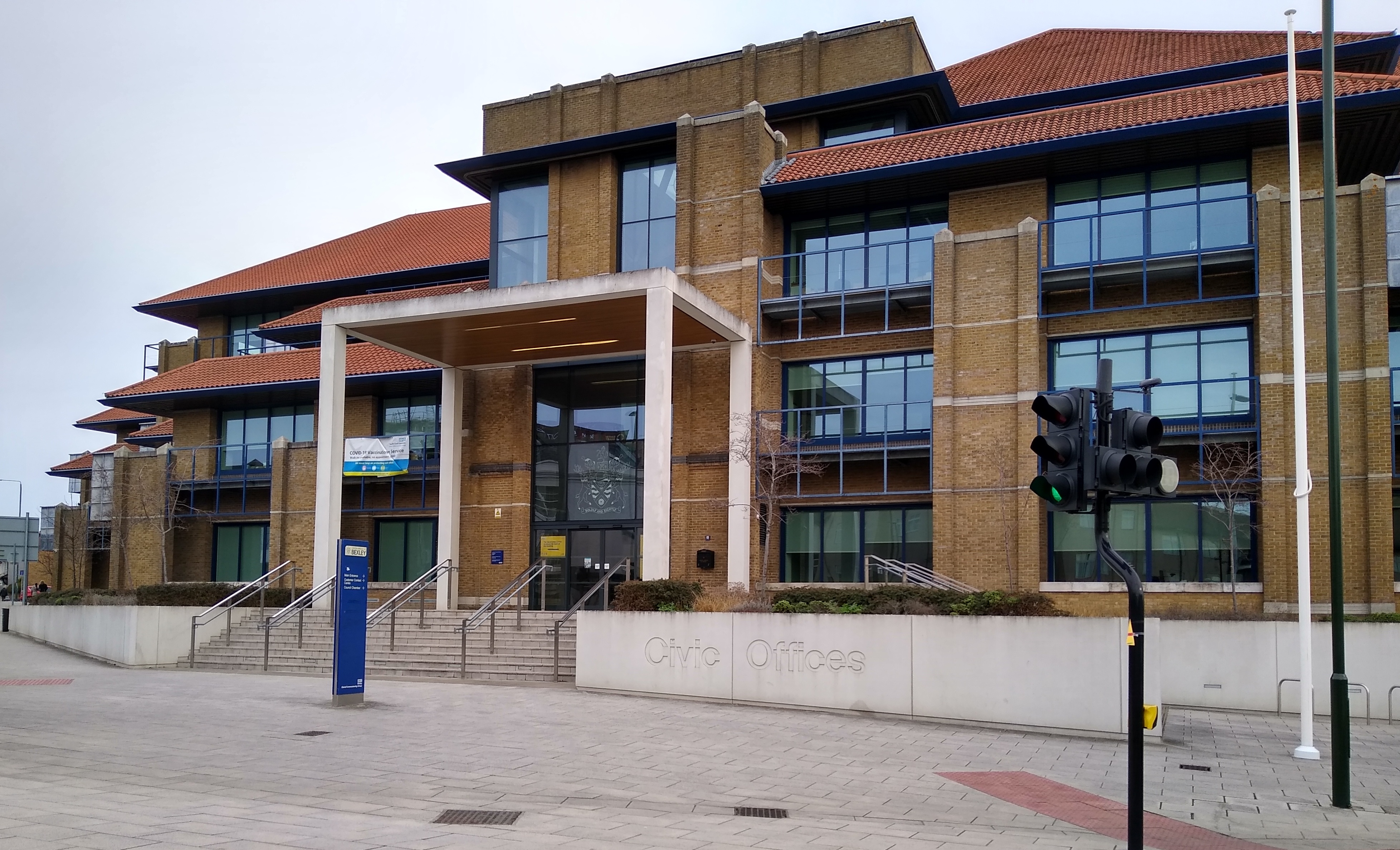
- Bexley Civic Offices

- Location within London Borough of Bexley

General information
- Location: Bexleyheath, London
- Coordinates: 51.4556°N 0.1537°E
- Inaugurated: 1989
- Renovated: 2014

Renovating team
- Architect: Bennetts Associates
- Renovating firm: Mace

The Bexley Civic Offices is a municipal facility in Watling Street, Bexleyheath, London. It is the headquarters of the Bexley London Borough Council.

== History ==
The new Bexley Urban District Council established offices in an early 19th-century building on the south side of the Broadway in Bexleyheath known as Oak House in 1903. After Bexley secured municipal borough status in 1932, Oak House remained the headquarters of the new Municipal Borough of Bexley until it was merged with the Municipal Borough of Erith to form the London Borough of Bexley with its new headquarters at Erith Town Hall in 1965. The new council only used Erith Town Hall briefly as it chose to demolish Oak House in 1979 to make way for purpose-built Civic Offices which opened on the same site on the south side of the Broadway in 1980.

The facility at Watling Street, which was designed in the style of a pagoda and built as the head office of the Woolwich Building Society at a cost of £10.5 million, was officially opened by Princess Anne in 1989. Following Barclays' acquisition of the building society in 2000 and a subsequent period of integration, the Watling Street building became vacant in 2005.

Meanwhile, Bexley London Borough Council was seeking new facilities to replace its aging Civic Offices on the south side of the Broadway. The Watling Street building was refurbished by Mace at a cost of £21.4 million to a design by Bennetts Associates. The works included alterations to facilitate open plan working and also involved the construction of a new building at the rear of the site to accommodate a council chamber, a council member's area and public galleries. Some 1,300 council staff, who were previously based in four separate locations in the borough, moved into the new Bexley Civic Offices in May 2014. It was officially opened by the Mayor of London, Boris Johnson, in October 2014.

In January 2021, during the COVID-19 pandemic, the civic offices were used as a site to carry out COVID-19 testing. Beginning in June, the offices were also used as a clinic to give out COVID-19 vaccines.
