= Barnehurst (ward) =

Electoral ward in Bexley, London, England

- Electoral ward for the Bexley London Borough Council
- Borough: Bexley
- County: Greater London
- Population: 11,678 (2021)
- Major settlements: Barnehurst
- Area: 2.033 km²

Current electoral ward
- Created: 1978
- Councillors: 2

Barnehurst is an electoral ward in the London Borough of Bexley. The ward was first used in the 1978 elections. It elects two councillors to Bexley London Borough Council.

== Geography ==
The ward is named after the town of Barnehurst.

== Councillors ==
Election	Councillors	
2022	Brian Bishop (Conservative)	Howard Jackson (Conservative)

== Elections ==
=== 2022 Bexley London Borough Council election ===
Barnehurst (2 seats)
Party	Candidate	Votes	%	±%
Conservative	Brian Bishop*	1,637	59.4	+2.6
Conservative	Howard Jackson*	1,599	58.0	+3.7
Labour	Elizabeth Folarin	1,173	42.5	
Labour	Andrew Smith	1,106	40.1	
Turnout		5,515	33.9	−4.87
Conservative hold		Swing		
Conservative hold		Swing		
