= Bexleyheath (ward) =

Electoral ward in Bexley, London, England

- Electoral ward for the Bexley London Borough Council
- Borough: Bexley
- County: Greater London
- Population: 15,617 (2021)
- Major settlements: Bexleyheath
- Area: 3.496 km²

Current electoral ward
- Created: 2018
- Councillors: 3

Bexleyheath is an electoral ward in the London Borough of Bexley. The ward was first used in the 2018 elections. It elects three councillors to Bexley London Borough Council.

== Geography ==
The ward is named after the town of Bexleyheath.

== Councillors ==
| Election | Councillors | | |
|---|---|---|---|
| 2022 | Sue Gower (Conservative) | Bola Carew (Conservative) | Rags Sandhu (Conservative) |

== Elections ==
=== 2022 Bexley London Borough Council election ===
Bexleyheath (3 seats)
| Party | Candidate | Votes | % | ±% |
|---|---|---|---|---|
| Conservative | Sue Gower* | 2,364 | 60.9 | +0.4 |
| Conservative | Bola Carew | 2,154 | 55.5 | |
| Conservative | Rags Sandhu | 1,983 | 51.1 | |
| Labour | Eric Davies | 1,599 | 41.2 | |
| Labour | Matthew Murphy | 1,568 | 40.4 | |
| Labour | Pat Ball | 1,532 | 39.5 | |
| Liberal Democrats | Jawharah Albakri | 436 | 11.2 | |
| Turnout | | 11,636 | 35.5 | −0.01 |
| Conservative hold | | Swing | | |
| Conservative hold | | Swing | | |
| Conservative hold | | Swing | | |
