= Borough of Bexley =

Borough of Bexley could refer to:

- London Borough of Bexley, created 1965 and currently existing
- Municipal Borough of Bexley, abolished 1965
