= Northumberland Heath (ward) =

Electoral ward in Bexley, London, England

- Electoral ward for the Bexley London Borough Council
- Borough: Bexley
- County: Greater London
- Population: 11,143 (2021)
- Major settlements: Northumberland Heath
- Area: 1.782 km²

Current electoral ward
- Created: 1965
- Councillors: 2 (since 2018); 3 (1964 to 2018)

Northumberland Heath is an electoral ward in the London Borough of Bexley. The ward was first used in the 1964 elections. It elects two councillors to Bexley London Borough Council.

== Geography ==
The ward is named after the suburb of Northumberland Heath.

== Councillors ==
Election	Councillors	
2022	Baljeet Gill (Labour)	Wendy Perfect (Labour)

== Elections ==
=== 2022 Bexley London Borough Council election ===
Northumberland Heath (2 seats)
Party	Candidate	Votes	%	±%
Labour	Baljeet Gill	1,361	51.8	
Labour	Wendy Perfect*	1,345	51.2	+6.7
Conservative	Aaron Newbury	1,157	44.0	
Conservative	Duwayne Brooks	1,146	43.6	
Liberal Democrats	Paul Bargery	248	9.4	+2.2
Turnout		5,257	35.6	−2.76
Labour hold		Swing		
Labour gain from Conservative		Swing		
