= Blackfen and Lamorbey =

Electoral ward in Bexley, London, England

- Electoral ward for the Bexley London Borough Council
- Borough: Bexley
- County: Greater London
- Population: 16,726 (2021)
- Area: 3.144 km²

Current electoral ward
- Created: 2002
- Councillors: 3

Blackfen and Lamorbey is an electoral ward in the London Borough of Bexley. The ward was first used in the 2002 elections. It elects three councillors to Bexley London Borough Council.

== Geography ==
The ward is named after the districts of Blackfen and Lamorbey.

== Councillors ==
Election	Councillors		
2022	James Hunt (Conservative)	Peter Craske (Conservative)	Cafer Munur (Conservative)

== Elections ==
=== 2022 Bexley London Borough Council election ===
Blackfen and Lamorbey (3 seats)
Party	Candidate	Votes	%	±%
Conservative	James Hunt*	2,199	59.3	+1.6
Conservative	Peter Craske*	2,185	58.9	+1.2
Conservative	Cafer Munur*	1,924	51.9	+6.6
Labour	Josephine Chodha	1,349	36.4	
Labour	John Cove	1,310	35.3	
Labour	Daniel Jenkins	1,295	34.9	+9.0
Liberal Democrats	Robin Kelly	538	14.5	
Reform	Michael Pastor	325	8.8	
Turnout		11,125	33.0	−5.73
Conservative hold		Swing		
Conservative hold		Swing		
Conservative hold		Swing		
