= Longlands (ward) =

Electoral ward in Bexley, London, England

- Electoral ward for the Bexley London Borough Council
- Borough: Bexley
- County: Greater London
- Population: 10,079 (2021)
- Major settlements: Longlands
- Area: 2.007 km²

Current electoral ward
- Created: 2002
- Councillors: 2

Longlands is an electoral ward in the London Borough of Bexley. The ward was first used in the 2002 elections. It elects two councillors to Bexley London Borough Council.

== Geography ==
The ward is named after the district of Longlands.

== Councillors ==
Election	Councillors	
2022	Lisa-Jane Moore (Conservative)	Andy Dourmoush (Conservative)

== Elections ==
=== 2022 Bexley London Borough Council election ===
Longlands (2 seats)
Party	Candidate	Votes	%	±%
Conservative	Lisa-Jane Moore*	1,504	57.4	−4.7
Conservative	Andy Dourmoush*	1,347	51.4	−1.2
Labour	Teresa Gray	1,029	39.3	
Labour	Anashua Davies	1,014	38.7	
Liberal Democrats	Oliver Brooks	346	13.2	
Turnout		5,240	36.6	−4.69%
Conservative hold		Swing		
Conservative hold		Swing		
