= Sidcup (ward) =

Electoral ward in Bexley, London, England

- Electoral ward for the Bexley London Borough Council
- Borough: Bexley
- County: Greater London
- Population: 15,421 (2021)
- Major settlements: Sidcup
- Area: 4.264 km²

Current electoral ward
- Created: 2002
- Councillors: 3

Sidcup is an electoral ward in the London Borough of Bexley. The ward was first used in the 2002 elections. It elects three councillors to Bexley London Borough Council.

== Geography ==
The ward is named after the suburb of Sidcup.

== Councillors ==
Election	Councillors		
2022	Cheryl Bacon (Conservative)	June Slaughter (Conservative)	Richard Diment (Conservative)

== Elections ==
=== 2022 Bexley London Borough Council election ===
Sidcup (3 seats)
Party	Candidate	Votes	%	±%
Conservative	June Slaughter*	1,828	51.3	−4.2
Conservative	Cheryl Bacon*	1,818	51.1	−8.3
Conservative	Richard Diment*	1,815	51.0	−2.0
Labour	Paul Hinkley	1,211	34.0	
Labour	Tonya Kelsey	1,204	33.8	
Labour	Ben Nottle	1,082	30.4	
Liberal Democrats	Paul Hurren	484	13.6	
Liberal Democrats	Simone Reynolds	472	13.3	+4.9
Liberal Democrats	David Sexton	407	11.4	+5.5
Independent	Dimitri Shvorob	261	7.3	
SDP	Laurence Williams	100	2.8	+0.9
Turnout		10,682	33.1	−5.83
Conservative hold		Swing		
Conservative hold		Swing		
Conservative hold		Swing		
