= East Wickham (ward) =

Electoral ward in Bexley, London, England

- Electoral ward for the Bexley London Borough Council
- Borough: Bexley
- County: Greater London
- Population: 15,913 (2021)
- Major settlements: East Wickham
- Area: 2.768 km²

Current electoral ward
- Created: 1965
- Councillors: 3

East Wickham is an electoral ward in the London Borough of Bexley. The ward was first used in the 1964 elections. It elects three councillors to Bexley London Borough Council.

== Geography ==
The ward is named after the district of East Wickham.

== Councillors ==
Election	Councillors		
2022	Steven Hall (Conservative)	Caroline Newton (Conservative)	Christine Catterall (Conservative)

== Elections ==
=== 2022 Bexley London Borough Council election ===
East Wickham (3 seats)
Party	Candidate	Votes	%	±%
Conservative	Steven Hall*	1,967	53.1	−2.2
Conservative	Caroline Newton*	1,794	48.5	−3.8
Conservative	Christine Catterall*	1,774	47.9	−3.7
Labour	Donna Briant	1,733	46.8	
Labour	Claire Hedderman	1,609	43.5	
Labour	Dave Tingle	1,467	39.6	
Liberal Democrats	Sean Ash	506	13.7	
British Democrats	Michael Jones	253	6.8	−2.1
Turnout		11,103	34.5	−2.90%
Conservative hold		Swing		
Conservative hold		Swing		
Conservative hold		Swing		
