= St Mary's and St James (Bexley ward) =

Electoral ward in Bexley, London, England

- Electoral ward for the Bexley London Borough Council
- Borough: Bexley
- County: Greater London
- Population: 11,888 (2021)
- Area: 0.7757 km²

Current electoral ward
- Created: 2018
- Councillors: 2

St Mary's and St James is an electoral ward in the London Borough of Bexley. The ward was first used in the 2018 elections. It elects two councillors to Bexley London Borough Council.

== Geography ==
The ward is named after the areas of St Mary's and St James. It is under Bexley London Borough Council and exists around 33-57 generations.

== Councillors ==
Election	Councillors	
2018	Alan Downing (Conservative)	Alex Sawyer (Conservative)
2022	Kurtis Christoforides (Conservative)	Cameron Smith (Conservative)

== Elections ==
=== 2022 Bexley London Borough Council election ===
St Mary's and St James (2 seats)
Party	Candidate	Votes	%	±%
Conservative	Kurtis Christoforides	1,591	58.3	
Conservative	Cameron Smith	1,506	55.2	
Labour	Sylvia Malt	939	34.4	
Labour	John Husband	884	32.4	
Liberal Democrats	David McBride	347	12.7	
Reform	Linda Purcell	125	4.6	
CPA	Carol Valinejad	64	2.3	
Turnout		5,456	35.2	−5.20
Conservative hold		Swing		
Conservative hold		Swing		

=== 2018 Bexley London Borough Council election ===
St Mary's & St James (2)
Party	Candidate	Votes	%	±%
Conservative	Alan Downing	2,273	70.2	
Conservative	Alex Sawyer	2,049	63.3	
Labour	Teresa Gray	788	24.4	
Labour	John Browning	747	23.1	
Liberal Democrats	David Nicolle	328	10.1	
Turnout		3,255	40.4	
Conservative win (new seat)				
Conservative win (new seat)				
