= Blendon and Penhill =

- Electoral ward for the Bexley London Borough Council
- Blendon and Penhill ward boundaries since 2018
- Borough: Bexley
- County: Greater London
- Population: 15,631 (2021)
- Electorate: 11,641 (2022)
- Area: 3.232 square kilometres (1.248 sq mi)

Current electoral ward
- Created: 1965
- Councillors: 3
- GSS code: E05011221 (2018–present)

Blendon and Penhill is an electoral ward in the London Borough of Bexley. The ward was first used in the 1978 elections. It returns three councillors to Bexley London Borough Council.

== Bexley council elections since 2018 ==
There was a revision of ward boundaries in Bexley in 2018.

=== 2022 election ===
The election took place on 5 May 2022.

2022 Bexley London Borough Council election: Blendon and Penhill
| Party | Candidate | Votes | % | ±% |
|---|---|---|---|---|
| Conservative | Patrick Adams | 2,267 | 64.8 | |
| Conservative | Nick O'Hare | 2,040 | 58.3 | −4.5 |
| Conservative | David Leaf | 2,012 | 57.5 | −3.6 |
| Labour | Emma Francis | 1,322 | 37.8 | |
| Labour | Ahmad Brooke | 1,099 | 31.4 | |
| Labour | Floyd Millen | 1,092 | 31.2 | |
| Liberal Democrats | Bruce Meredeen | 402 | 11.5 | |
| Reform | Marc Mason | 262 | 7.5 | |
| Turnout | | 10,496 | 33.2 | −4.49 |
| Conservative hold | | Swing | | |
| Conservative hold | | Swing | | |
| Conservative hold | | Swing | | |

=== 2018 election ===
The election took place on 3 May 2018.

2018 Bexley London Borough Council election: Blendon and Penhill
| Party | Candidate | Votes | % | ±% |
|---|---|---|---|---|
| Conservative | Adam Wildman | 2,835 | 64.6 | |
| Conservative | Nick O'Hare | 2,759 | 62.8 | |
| Conservative | David Leaf | 2,683 | 61.1 | |
| Labour | Pat Ball | 1,098 | 25.0 | |
| Labour | Chris Mace | 978 | 22.3 | |
| Labour | Brian Silk | 917 | 20.9 | |
| UKIP | Linda Harris | 497 | 11.3 | |
| Liberal Democrats | Jawharah Albakri | 334 | 7.6 | |
| Turnout | | 4,419 | 37.7 | |
| Conservative win (new boundaries) | | | | |
| Conservative win (new boundaries) | | | | |
| Conservative win (new boundaries) | | | | |

== 2002–2018 Bexley council elections ==
There was a revision in ward boundaries in Bexley in 2002.

=== 2014 election ===
The election took place on 22 May 2014.

=== 2010 election ===
The election on 6 May 2010 took place on the same day as the United Kingdom general election.

=== 2006 election ===
The election took place on 4 May 2006.

=== 2002 election ===
The election took place on 2 May 2002.

== 1978–2002 Bexley council elections ==
=== 1998 election ===
The election took place on 7 May 1998.

=== 1994 election ===
The election took place on 5 May 1994.

=== 1990 election ===
The election took place on 3 May 1990.

=== 1986 election ===
The election took place on 8 May 1986.

=== 1982 election ===
The election took place on 6 May 1982.

=== 1978 election ===
The election took place on 4 May 1978.
