= Falconwood and Welling =

Electoral ward in Bexley, London, England

- Electoral ward for the Bexley London Borough Council
- Borough: Bexley
- County: Greater London
- Population: 16,573 (2021)
- Major settlements: Falconwood and Welling
- Area: 2.894 km^{2}

Current electoral ward
- Created: 2002
- Councillors: 3

Falconwood and Welling is an electoral ward in the London Borough of Bexley. The ward was first used in the 2002 elections. It elects three councillors to Bexley London Borough Council.

== Geography ==
The ward is named after the towns of Falconwood and Welling.

== Councillors ==
Election	Councillors		
2022	Nigel Betts (Conservative)	Andrew Curtois (Conservative)	Frazer Brooks (Conservative)

== Elections ==
=== 2022 Bexley London Borough Council election ===
Falconwood and Welling (3 seats)
Party	Candidate	Votes	%	±%
Conservative	Nigel Betts*	2,047	57.7	+1.1
Conservative	Andrew Curtois	1,894	53.4	
Conservative	Frazer Brooks	1,795	50.6	
Labour	Sarah Miller	1,494	42.1	
Labour	Jeremy Fosten	1,360	38.3	
Labour	Stephen Perfect	1,273	35.9	
Green	Elisabeth Radbon	538	15.2	+6.2
Reform	Marian Newton	245	6.9	
Turnout		10,646	32.0	−7.75%
Conservative hold		Swing		
Conservative hold		Swing		
Conservative hold		Swing		
