= 1964 Bexley London Borough Council election =

1964 Bexley Council election
- 7 May 1964

All 56 council seats
	First party	Second party
Leader	James Wellbeloved	no leader
Party	Labour	Conservative
Seats won	39	17
Popular vote	100,249	76,170
Percentage	49.3%	37.4%
- Map of the results. Conservatives in blue, Labour in red.
Subsequent council control
Labour majority

The 1964 Bexley Council election took place on 7 May 1964 to elect members of Bexley London Borough Council in London, England. The whole council was up for election and the Labour party gained control of the council.

== Background ==
These elections were the first to the newly formed borough. Previously elections had taken place in the Municipal Borough of Bexley, Municipal Borough of Erith, Chislehurst and Sidcup Urban District and Crayford Urban District. These boroughs and districts were joined to form the new London Borough of Bexley by the London Government Act 1963.

A total of 157 candidates stood in the election for the 56 seats being contested across 20 wards. These included a full slate from the Labour party, while the Conservative and Liberal parties stood 50 and 47 respectively. Other candidates included 3 Independents and 1 Communist. There were 13 three-seat wards, 4 two-seat wards, 2 four-seat wards and 1 single-seat ward.

This election had aldermen as well as directly elected councillors. Labour got 7 aldermen and the Conservatives 2.

The council was elected in 1964 as a "shadow authority" but did not start operations until 1 April 1965.

== Election result ==
1964 Bexley London Borough Council election
Party	Candidates						Votes		
Party	Stood	Elected	Gained	Unseated	Net	% of total	%	No.	Net %
Labour	56	39	New	New	New	69.6	49.3	100,249	New
Conservative	50	17	New	New	New	30.4	37.4	76,170	New
Liberal	47	0	New	New	New	0	11.8	24,060	New
Independent	3	0	New	New	New	0	1.4	2,820	New
Communist	1	0	New	New	New	0	0.1	158	New
Total	157	56				100.0		203,457	

The results saw Labour gain control of the new council with a majority of 22 after winning 39 of the 56 seats. Overall turnout in the election was 47.1%. This turnout included 1,126 postal votes.

== Ward results ==
Belvedere (3)
Party	Candidate	Votes	%	±%
Labour	Mrs. M. E. Barron	2,008		
Labour	Mrs. B. C. Scott	1,954		
Labour	Miss S. E. Gadsdon	1,953		
Independent	Mrs. A. A. Taylor	1,004		
Independent	C. B. Hills	908		
Independent	B. A. Sams	908		
Conservative	Miss Y. S. M. Halsey	865		
Conservative	J. Holden	864		
Conservative	A. S. Stanton	804		
Liberal	S. S. Sims	325		
Liberal	E. Hepworth	295		
Liberal	S. S. Tribe	276		
Turnout		4,141	45.3	
Labour win (new seat)				
Labour win (new seat)				
Labour win (new seat)				

Bostall (3)
Party	Candidate	Votes	%	±%
Labour	P. E. Daynes	1,667		
Labour	D. T. Enticknap	1,657		
Labour	Mrs. R. M. Irvine	1,634		
Conservative	Mrs. D. M. MacLean	1,501		
Conservative	D. A. Wright	1,463		
Conservative	R. S. Belcham	1,427		
Liberal	D. J. Morby	283		
Liberal	R. G. Hinson	271		
Liberal	Mrs. A. M. Thomas	271		
Turnout		3,448	49.3	
Labour win (new seat)				
Labour win (new seat)				
Labour win (new seat)				

Brampton (3)
Party	Candidate	Votes	%	±%
Labour	B. Francis	2,065		
Labour	E. Furness	2,064		
Labour	A. H. Cross	2,042		
Conservative	Mrs. J. Barker	1,956		
Conservative	W. Wicks	1,924		
Conservative	E. C. C. Gillman	1,907		
Liberal	L. Lovegrove	457		
Liberal	K. Piper	443		
Liberal	Mrs. A. Tampling	429		
Turnout		4,485	54.4	
Labour win (new seat)				
Labour win (new seat)				
Labour win (new seat)				

Christchurch (3)
Party	Candidate	Votes	%	±%
Conservative	J. Canton	1,806		
Conservative	Mrs. H. Piggott	1,787		
Conservative	C. Harvey	1,739		
Labour	M. Coomes	1,664		
Labour	Mrs. C. Melbourne	1,608		
Labour	A. Scutt	1,601		
Liberal	M. Townsend	551		
Liberal	B. Hepworth	502		
Liberal	E. Deal	494		
Turnout		3,971	50.1	
Conservative win (new seat)				
Conservative win (new seat)				
Conservative win (new seat)				

Crayford North (3)
Party	Candidate	Votes	%	±%
Labour	P. S. Maxwell	2,467		
Labour	H. E. Clark	2,427		
Labour	J. D. Peacock	2,400		
Liberal	E. A. A. Kerridge	568		
Liberal	R. H. A. Saunders	533		
Liberal	E. M. M. Seaton	498		
Communist	L. H. Smith	158		
Turnout		3,083	34.2	
Labour win (new seat)				
Labour win (new seat)				
Labour win (new seat)				

Crayford Town (3)
Party	Candidate	Votes	%	±%
Labour	J. Kerr	2,155		
Labour	Mrs. E. White	2,118		
Labour	A. Turner	2,110		
Liberal	J. S. Lacey	694		
Liberal	P. A. Bawcutt	680		
Liberal	M. A. Green	659		
Turnout		2,888	41.2	
Labour win (new seat)				
Labour win (new seat)				
Labour win (new seat)				

Crayford West (2)
Party	Candidate	Votes	%	±%
Labour	Mrs. F. M. Pilbrow	1,140		
Labour	K. J. Smith	1,074		
Conservative	O. R. Lowery	848		
Conservative	A. G. McKie	810		
Liberal	A. G. Gardner	668		
Liberal	T. Turner	620		
Turnout		2,635	48.4	
Labour win (new seat)				
Labour win (new seat)				

Danson (3)
Party	Candidate	Votes	%	±%
Labour	A. S. Melbourne	2,503		
Labour	R. Hazelton	2,432		
Labour	D. R. S. Anderson	2,412		
Conservative	Mrs. A. E. F. Orange	1,786		
Conservative	G. Dray	1,768		
Conservative	B. Huson	1,761		
Turnout		4,305	53.5	
Labour win (new seat)				
Labour win (new seat)				
Labour win (new seat)				

East Wickham (3)
Party	Candidate	Votes	%	±%
Labour	R. B. Burke	1,862		
Labour	F. Archer	1,814		
Labour	Mrs. D. L. Taylor	1,755		
Conservative	Mrs. P. Monk	1,507		
Conservative	W. Homer	1,477		
Conservative	Mrs. R. S. Holden	1,451		
Liberal	G. Bricher	320		
Liberal	Mrs. E. Prince	256		
Liberal	Mrs. J. Collins	239		
Turnout		3,618	46.6	
Labour win (new seat)				
Labour win (new seat)				
Labour win (new seat)				

Erith Town (3)
Party	Candidate	Votes	%	±%
Labour	J. N. Powrie	2,147		
Labour	A. J. Wellbeloved	2,098		
Labour	E. E. Virrells	2,074		
Conservative	Miss W. E. B. Palmer	742		
Conservative	F. W. Riding	707		
Conservative	Mrs. N. I. Hooper	692		
Liberal	W. Maxim	431		
Liberal	N. White	370		
Turnout		3,226	41.4	
Labour win (new seat)				
Labour win (new seat)				
Labour win (new seat)				

Falconwood (2)
Party	Candidate	Votes	%	±%
Labour	E. R. J. Stoneman	1,185		
Labour	E. Murphy	1,179		
Conservative	W. Flint	1,132		
Conservative	V. R. M. Langton	1,118		
Turnout		2,347	55.0	
Labour win (new seat)				
Labour win (new seat)				

Lamorbey East (3)
Party	Candidate	Votes	%	±%
Conservative	J. A. Owles	1,515		
Conservative	L. J. Ryder	1,501		
Conservative	T. W. Winch	1,476		
Labour	Mrs. F. H. Schuch	1,247		
Labour	F. P. Sellars	1,244		
Labour	R. M. Best	1,230		
Liberal	A. H. Morris	493		
Liberal	R. Marsh	492		
Liberal	D. Veriod	473		
Turnout		3,265	44.7	
Conservative win (new seat)				
Conservative win (new seat)				
Conservative win (new seat)				

Lamorbey West (4)
Party	Candidate	Votes	%	±%
Labour	J. Cronin	2,489		
Labour	Mrs. E. M. Sheppard	2,485		
Labour	J. W. Schuch	2,477		
Labour	M. J. Attewell	2,444		
Conservative	A. Robinson	1,931		
Conservative	C. F. E. Smith	1,897		
Conservative	R. H. H. Sarton	1,889		
Conservative	P. K. Talbot	1,869		
Liberal	E. R. Bruton	487		
Liberal	R. J. Callaghan	465		
Liberal	Mrs. S. Burraston	461		
Liberal	Mrs. A. Tucker	434		
Turnout		4,916	48.0	
Labour win (new seat)				
Labour win (new seat)				
Labour win (new seat)				
Labour win (new seat)				

North Cray (1)
Party	Candidate	Votes	%	±%
Labour	Miss E. Rhodes	674		
Conservative	Miss M. N. Cowie	476		
Turnout		1,155	47.6	
Labour win (new seat)				

Northumberland Heath (3)
Party	Candidate	Votes	%	±%
Labour	Mrs. J. Sidders	1,646		
Labour	E. Handy	1,609		
Labour	Mrs. M. M. Eccles	1,561		
Conservative	J. F. L. Gates	986		
Conservative	J. W. Seller	921		
Conservative	Mrs. E. Smart	874		
Liberal	E. N. Payne	570		
Liberal	A. W. Kelly	532		
Liberal	Mrs. G. M. Kelly	498		
Turnout		3,141	40.0	
Labour win (new seat)				
Labour win (new seat)				
Labour win (new seat)				

St Mary's (4)
Party	Candidate	Votes	%	±%
Conservative	F. Brearley	2,732		
Conservative	H. W. Friend	2,703		
Conservative	J. Mason	2,641		
Conservative	J. D. Minett	2,593		
Labour	E. Gulliver	1,398		
Labour	S. Kennard	1,377		
Labour	Mrs. R. Hone	1,346		
Labour	P. Rodriguez	1,346		
Liberal	S. Miall	1,156		
Liberal	J. Bennet	1,058		
Liberal	T. H. Batley	1,051		
Liberal	R. Bishop	1,013		
Turnout		5,168	51.8	
Conservative win (new seat)				
Conservative win (new seat)				
Conservative win (new seat)				
Conservative win (new seat)				

St Michael's (3)
Party	Candidate	Votes	%	±%
Labour	E. Newton	2,280		
Labour	J. A. Wellard	2,239		
Labour	J. C. McLean	2,222		
Conservative	Miss V. Meyrick	979		
Conservative	T. Yarrow	954		
Conservative	J. Balfe	950		
Liberal	G. White	430		
Liberal	C. E. Wright	429		
Liberal	J. Johnson	399		
Turnout		3,636	44.6	
Labour win (new seat)				
Labour win (new seat)				
Labour win (new seat)				

Sidcup East (3)
Party	Candidate	Votes	%	±%
Conservative	D. I. Evans	2,300		
Conservative	Mrs. E. M. Swift	2,160		
Conservative	B. J. Mahoney	2,158		
Labour	H. Clarke	1,726		
Labour	M. Alway	1,680		
Labour	D. Heselden	1,647		
Liberal	J. H. Mullis	685		
Liberal	A. King	595		
Liberal	F. A. Snow	587		
Turnout		4,571	49.9	
Conservative win (new seat)				
Conservative win (new seat)				
Conservative win (new seat)				

Sidcup West (2)
Party	Candidate	Votes	%	±%
Conservative	J. H. Harrington	1,894		
Conservative	R. Pope	1,883		
Labour	A. J. Corfield	916		
Labour	G. Robinson	898		
Liberal	Mrs. R. Mullis	311		
Liberal	J. Stokes	308		
Turnout		3,137	50.9	
Conservative win (new seat)				
Conservative win (new seat)				

Upton (2)
Party	Candidate	Votes	%	±%
Conservative	S. A. Cover	1,538		
Conservative	W. Smith	1,508		
Labour	S. Cooper	1,400		
Labour	Miss B. Wilkins	1,399		
Turnout		2,961	51.1	
Conservative win (new seat)				
Conservative win (new seat)				
