= Bexley London Borough Council =

Local authority in England

- Coat of arms

- Council logo

Type
- Type: London borough council of the London Borough of Bexley
- Houses: Unicameral

History
- Founded: 1 April 1965

Leadership
- Mayor: Lisa-Jane Moore, Conservative since 27 May 2026
- Leader: David Leaf, Conservative since 5 November 2025
- Chief Executive: Paul Thorogood since 23 October 2023

Structure
- Seats: 45 councillors
- Political groups: Administration (28) Conservative (28) Other parties (17) Labour (9) Reform UK (7) Independent (1)
- Length of term: 4 years

Elections
- Voting system: Plurality-at-large
- Last election: 7 May 2026
- Next election: 2030

Meeting place
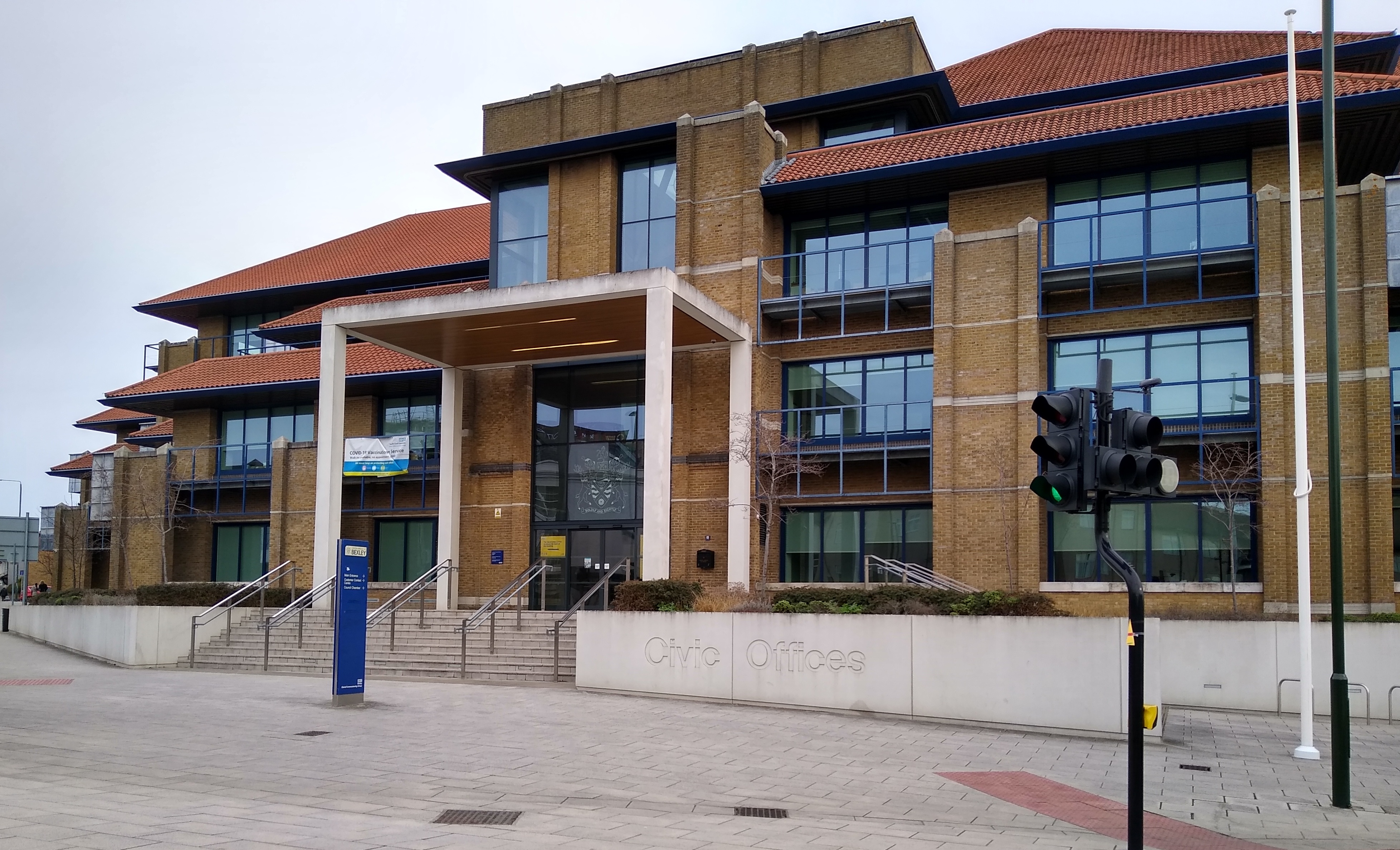
- Civic Offices, 2 Watling Street, Bexleyheath, DA6 7AT

Website
- www.bexley.gov.uk

Bexley London Borough Council, also known as Bexley Council, is the local authority for the London Borough of Bexley in Greater London, England. The council is responsible for the provision of a range of services within the borough. The council has been under Conservative majority control since 2006. It is based at Bexley Civic Offices in the Bexleyheath area of the borough.

== History ==
There has been a Bexley local authority since 1880 when the parish of Bexley, which included both the village of Bexley and Bexley Heath, was made a local government district, governed by an elected local board. Such districts were converted into urban districts under the Local Government Act 1894, which saw the board replaced by an urban district council. Bexley Urban District was incorporated to become a municipal borough in 1935, governed by a body formally called the "Mayor, Aldermen and Burgesses of the Borough of Bexley", but generally known as the corporation, borough council or town council.

The much larger London Borough of Bexley and its council were created under the London Government Act 1963, with the first election held in 1964. For its first year the council acted as a shadow authority alongside the area's four outgoing authorities, being the borough councils of Bexley and Erith, and the urban district councils of Crayford and Chislehurst and Sidcup (the latter in respect of the Sidcup area only; the Chislehurst area went to the London Borough of Bromley). The new council formally came into its powers on 1 April 1965, at which point the old districts and their councils were abolished.

The council's full legal name is "The Mayor and Burgesses of the London Borough of Bexley". Prior to 2007 the council branded itself "Bexley Council", which name is still commonly used for it.

From 1965 until 1986 the council was a lower-tier authority, with upper-tier functions provided by the Greater London Council. The split of powers and functions meant that the Greater London Council was responsible for "wide area" services such as fire, ambulance, flood prevention, and refuse disposal; with the boroughs (including Bexley) responsible for "personal" services such as social care, libraries, cemeteries and refuse collection. As an outer London borough council Bexley has been a local education authority since 1965. The Greater London Council was abolished in 1986 and its functions passed to the London Boroughs, with some services provided through joint committees.

Since 2000 the Greater London Authority has taken some responsibility for highways and planning control from the council, but within the English local government system the council remains a "most purpose" authority in terms of the available range of powers and functions.

== Powers and functions ==
The local authority derives its powers and functions from the London Government Act 1963 and subsequent legislation, and has the powers and functions of a London borough council. It sets council tax and as a billing authority it also collects precepts for Greater London Authority functions and business rates. It sets planning policies which complement Greater London Authority and national policies, and decides on almost all planning applications accordingly. It is also the local education authority.

== Political control ==
The council has been under Conservative majority control since 2006.

The first election to the council was held in 1964, initially operating as a shadow authority alongside the outgoing authorities until the new arrangements came into effect on 1 April 1965. Political control of the council since 1965 has been as follows:

Party in control	Years
Labour	1965–1968
Conservative	1968–1971
Labour	1971–1974
Conservative	1974–1994
No overall control	1994–1998
Conservative	1998–2002
Labour	2002–2006
Conservative	2006–present

=== Leadership ===
Political leadership is provided by the leader of the council. The role of mayor is largely ceremonial in Bexley. The leaders since 1965 have been:

Councillor	Party	From	To
Jim Wellbeloved	Labour	1965	1966
Peter Maxwell	Labour	1966	1968
Frederick Brearley	Conservative	1968	1971
Peter Maxwell	Labour	1971	1974
Julian Tremayne	Conservative	1974	1977
Len Newton	Conservative	1977	1994
Donna Briant	Labour	1994	1996
Kathryn Smith	Labour	1996	1998
Mike Slaughter	Conservative	1998	2002
Chris Ball	Labour	27 May 2002	May 2006
Ian Clement	Conservative	24 May 2006	5 May 2008
Teresa O'Neill	Conservative	14 May 2008	5 Nov 2025
David Leaf	Conservative	5 Nov 2025	

=== Mayoralty ===
The Mayor of Bexley is a ceremonial position representing Bexley at various events and chairing council meetings and the Civic Recognition Panel.

Councillor	Party	From	To
Marjorie Barron	Labour	1965	1966
Ken J Smith	Labour	1966	1967
John W Schuch (Note: Died in office.)	Labour	May 1967	November 1967
Frieda K Schuch	Labour	November 1967	May 1968
Jamieson-Harvey	Conservative	1968	1969
Norman Antenbring	Conservative	1969	1970
Raymond Pope	Conservative	1970	1971
Ken J Smith (Note: Second term, previously serving from 2008 to 2009.)	Labour	1971	1972
Beatrice Scott	Labour	1972	1973
Alf Turner	Labour	1973	1974
John D Minett	Conservative	1974	1975
Fred Brearley	Conservative	1975	1976
Agnes E F Orange (Note: Was a serving alderman at time of election.)	Conservative	1976	1977
William Flint	Conservative	1977	1978
Charles E Packer	Conservative	1978	1979
Frank Pearson-Sellars	Conservative	1979	1980
James Holden	Conservative	1980	1981
Brian Sams (Note: Brian Sams (1981–1982) is the brother of Ray Sams (2011–2012) and the husband of Rita Sams (1997–1998).)	Conservative	1981	1982
David Todd-Dunning	Conservative	1982	1983
John B Raggett	Conservative	1983	1984
Dennis C Bale	Conservative	1984	1985
Ronald J Passey	Conservative	1985	1986
Joan Stewart	Conservative	1986	1987
Stan Carter	Conservative	1987	1988
John N Harrington	Conservative	1988	1989
Malcolm Ketley	Conservative	1989	1990
Graham R Holland	Conservative	1990	1991
Alfred W Catterall	Conservative	1991	1992
Colin L Tandy	Conservative	1992	1993
Alfred Charlton	Conservative	1993	1994
Raymond Allen	Labour	1994	1995
Colin Wright	Liberal Democrats	1995	1996
Ron Brierly	Labour	1996	1997
Rita Sams	Conservative	1997	1998
Chris Ball	Labour	1998	1999
Linda Bailey	Conservative	1999	2000
John Wilkinson	Conservative	2000	2001
Aileen Beckwith	Conservative	2001	2002
Ann Lucas	Labour	2002	2003
Denis Daniels	Labour	2003	2004
John Eastaugh	Labour	2004	2005
John Shepheard	Labour	2005	2006
Brian Beckwith	Conservative	2006	2007
Nigel Betts	Conservative	2007	2008
Nick O'Hare	Conservative	2008	2009
Bernard Clewes MBE	Conservative	2009	2010
Val Clark	Conservative	2010	2011
Ray Sams	Conservative	2011	2012
Alan Downing	Conservative	2012	2013
Sharon Massey	Conservative	2013	2014
Howard Marriner	Conservative	2014	2015
Sybil Camsey	Conservative	2015	2016
Eileen Pallen	Conservative	2016	2017
Peter Reader	Conservative	2017	2018
Brian Bishop	Conservative	2018	2019
Geraldine Lucia-Harris	Conservative	2019	2020
James Hunt (Note: Served two consecutive terms.)	Conservative	2020	2022
Nick O'Hare (Note: Second term, previously serving from 2008 to 2009.)	Conservative	2022	2023
Andy Dourmoush	Conservative	2023	2024
Sue Gower	Conservative	2024	2025
Christine Catterall	Conservative	2025	2026
Lisa-Jane Moore	Conservative	2026	

=== Composition ===
Following the 2026 election and subsequent changes up to October 2026, the composition of the council was:

Party	Councillors
Conservative	28
Labour	9
Reform	7
Independent	1
Total	45

Councillor Dave Curtois, elected as a Conservative in 2026, sat as an independent from 11 June 2026 following a row over the approval of a Go Ape facility in Danson Park by his party's administration.

The next election is due in May 2030.

== Elections ==
Since the last boundary changes in 2018 the council has comprised 45 councillors representing 17 wards, with each ward electing two or three councillors. Elections are held every four years.

== Wards ==
The wards of Bexley and the number of seats:

1. Barnehurst (2)
2. Belvedere (3)
3. Bexleyheath (3)
4. Blackfen & Lamorbey (3)
5. Blendon & Penhill (3)
6. Crayford (3)
7. Crook Log (3)
8. East Wickham (3)
9. Erith (2)
10. Falconwood & Welling (3)
11. Longlands (2)
12. Northumberland Heath (2)
13. Sidcup (3)
14. Slade Green & Northend (2)
15. St Mary's & St James (2)
16. Thamesmead East (3)
17. West Heath (3)

== Premises ==
The council is based at the Civic Offices on Watling Street in Bexleyheath. The building was completed in 1989 as the headquarters of Woolwich Building Society. The council moved into the building in 2014.

When the modern council was created in 1965, its functions had been divided between the buildings inherited from its predecessors at Erith Town Hall, Crayford Town Hall, Sidcup Place, and Oak House on Broadway in Bexleyheath. Oak House was subsequently demolished and a new building called Civic Offices was built on the site, opening in 1980. The Broadway building remained the council's headquarters until 2014, and has since been redeveloped.
