= 2022 Bexley London Borough Council election =

2022 local election in Bexley

- 5 May 2022

All 45 council seats
- Turnout: 37.1%
	First party	Second party
Leader	Teresa O'Neill	Stef Borella
Party	Conservative	Labour
Last election	34 seats, 50.4%	11 seats, 33.7%
Seats won	33	12
Seat change	▼1	▲1
- Map of the results. Conservatives in blue, Labour in red.
Council control before election
Conservative
Subsequent council control
Conservative

The 2022 Bexley London Borough Council election took place on 5 May 2022. 45 members of Bexley London Borough Council were elected. The elections took place alongside local elections in the other London boroughs and elections to local authorities across the United Kingdom.

In the previous election in 2018, the Conservative Party maintained its longstanding control of the council, winning 34 out of the 45 seats with the Labour Party forming the council opposition with the remaining 11 seats.

== Background ==
=== History ===
Result of the 2018 borough election

The thirty-two London boroughs were established in 1965 by the London Government Act 1963. They are the principal authorities in Greater London and have responsibilities including education, housing, planning, highways, social services, libraries, recreation, waste, environmental health and revenue collection. Some of the powers are shared with the Greater London Authority, which also manages passenger transport, police, and fire.

Bexley has generally been controlled by the Conservatives since its creation, except for the elections of 1964, 1971 and 2002 which resulted in Labour councils, and the 1994 council election which resulted in no overall control. Most councillors for the borough have been from the Conservative and Labour parties, with a number of Liberal Democrats being elected between 1982 and 2002. Independent and UK Independence Party candidates have also been elected. In the prior election in 2018, the Conservatives maintained their longstanding control of the council, winning 34 seats while Labour won eleven. Although neither party won any seats, the Liberal Democrats received 5.7% of the vote across the borough and the UK Independence Party won 5.6% of the vote. The 2018 elections took place on new boundaries which reduced the number of councillors for the borough from 63 to 45. These boundaries remained in place for the 2022 election.

=== Council term ===
One of the three Labour councillors for Thamesmead East, Danny Hackett, resigned from his party in 2019 to sit as an independent councillor. He blamed the party's leadership for "a culture of bullying and toxicity". Later in 2019, Hackett denied allegations against him from several women who had accused him of sexual misconduct, which he denied. One of the Conservative councillors for Longlands ward, Gareth Bacon, was elected as MP for Orpington in the 2019 general election. He announced his intention to resign as a councillor in 2021, though due to the COVID-19 pandemic the by-election was not held until 6 May 2021. The Conservative candidate Lisa-Jane Moore was elected to successfully defend the seat for her party. The Member of Parliament for Old Bexley and Sidcup, a constituency covering the southern part of the borough, James Brokenshire, died in October 2021. In the ensuing by-election, the Conservative candidate was Louie French, a councillor for Falconwood and Welling, and the Labour candidate Daniel Francis was a councillor for Belvedere ward. The Conservatives held the seat on a reduced majority.

== Electoral process ==
Bexley, as with all other London borough councils, elects all of its councillors at once every four years, with the previous election having taken place in 2018. The election took place by multi-member first-past-the-post voting, with each ward being represented by two or three councillors. Electors had as many votes as there are councillors to be elected in their ward, with the top two or three being elected.

All registered electors (British, Irish, Commonwealth and European Union citizens) living in London aged 18 or over were entitled to vote in the election. People who lived at two addresses in different councils, such as university students with different term-time and holiday addresses, were entitled to be registered for and vote in elections in both local authorities. Voting in-person at polling stations took place from 7:00 to 22:00 on election day, and voters were able to apply for postal votes or proxy votes in advance of the election.

== Councillors not standing for re-election ==
A number of councillors did not stand for re-election and/or had their party whip removed due to impropriety or controversy. Councillor Danny Hackett, Thamesmead East (Labour), was an independent councillor after allegations of sexual misconduct on social media, which he denied. Councillor Adam Wildman, Blackfen & Lamorbey (Conservative) no longer sat as a Tory after being found to have participated in a lockdown-breaking party with former mayoral candidate Shaun Bailey. Councillor Dave Putson, Belvedere (Labour) also lost the whip. Councillor Linda Bailey, Crook Log (Conservative) died in office in 2022. Finally, Councillor Louie French, Falconwood & Welling (Conservative) ceased to take an allowance after being elected at the Old Bexley & Sidcup by-election of 2021. He did, however, attend the final council meeting of the 2018-2022 term.

== Outcome of 2022 election ==
Despite initial suggestions of around four seats changing hands from the Conservative party to the Labour party, this did not materialise. However, the previously split ward of Northumberland Heath returned two Labour candidates compared to a previous one Labour and one Conservative. Across the Borough, the vote share for the Conservative party fell by around 4%, with Labour gaining around 7%. In the seat of East Wickham, the highest placed Labour candidate was only 41 votes short of the nearest Conservative. In Crayford, that number was only 89. Many seats began to become more marginal as a result of lower turnout and increased Labour votes in some areas. The Liberal Democrats did not increase their vote share on a borough-wide basis, but did succeed in increasing their vote share in some seats.

== Previous council composition ==
Councillors prior to the 2022 election

Councillors after 2022 election

After 2018 election		After 2022 election	
Party	Seats	Party	Seats
Conservative	34	Conservative	33
Labour	11	Labour	12

== Results summary ==
2022 Bexley London Borough Council election
Party	Seats	Gains	Losses	Net gain/loss	Seats %	Votes %	Votes	+/−
Conservative	33	0	1	▼1	73.3	50.8	74,254	+0.4
Labour	12	1	0	▲1	26.7	44.0	64,294	+10.3
Liberal Democrats	0	0	0	0	0.0	3.4	5,005	-2.3
Green	0	0	0	0	0.0	0.7	1,071	-1.0
Reform	0	0	0	0	0.0	0.7	957	New
Independent	0	0	0	0	0.0	0.2	261	-1.0
British Democrats	0	0	0	0	0.0	0.2	253	New
SDP	0	0	0	0	0.0	0.1	100	New
CPA	0	0	0	0	0.0	0.0	64	New

== Ward results ==
Statements of persons nominated were published on 6 April. Incumbent councillors are marked with an asterisk (*). Those elected are in bold.

=== Barnehurst ===
Barnehurst (2 seats)
Party	Candidate	Votes	%	±%
**Conservative**	**Brian Bishop***	**1,637**	**59.4**	**+2.6**
**Conservative**	**Howard Jackson***	**1,599**	**58.0**	**+3.7**
Labour	Elizabeth Folarin	1,173	42.5	
Labour	Andrew Smith	1,106	40.1	
Turnout		5,515	33.9	−4.87
Conservative **hold**		Swing		
Conservative **hold**		Swing		

=== Belvedere ===
Belvedere (3 seats)
Party	Candidate	Votes	%	±%
**Labour**	**Sally Hinkley***	**2,033**	**61.0**	**−0.3**
**Labour**	**Esther Amaning***	**1,998**	**60.0**	**−9.5**
**Labour**	**Daniel Francis***	**1,956**	**58.7**	**−1.4**
Conservative	Christine Bishop*	1,278	38.4	−10.5
Conservative	William Dorgu	1,126	33.8	
Conservative	Viny Poon	1,072	32.2	
Green	Sarah Barry	533	16.0	
Turnout		9,996	31.3	−2.68
Labour **hold**		Swing		
Labour **hold**		Swing		
Labour **hold**		Swing		

=== Bexleyheath ===
Bexleyheath (3 seats)
Party	Candidate	Votes	%	±%
**Conservative**	**Sue Gower***	**2,364**	**60.9**	**+0.4**
**Conservative**	**Bola Carew**	**2,154**	**55.5**	
**Conservative**	**Rags Sandhu**	**1,983**	**51.1**	
Labour	Eric Davies	1,599	41.2	
Labour	Matthew Murphy	1,568	40.4	
Labour	Pat Ball	1,532	39.5	
Liberal Democrats	Jawharah Albakri	436	11.2	
Turnout		11,636	35.5	−0.01
Conservative **hold**		Swing		
Conservative **hold**		Swing		
Conservative **hold**		Swing		

=== Blackfen and Lamorbey ===
Blackfen and Lamorbey (3 seats)
Party	Candidate	Votes	%	±%
**Conservative**	**James Hunt***	**2,199**	**59.3**	**+1.6**
**Conservative**	**Peter Craske***	**2,185**	**58.9**	**+1.2**
**Conservative**	**Cafer Munur***	**1,924**	**51.9**	**+6.6**
Labour	Josephine Chodha	1,349	36.4	
Labour	John Cove	1,310	35.3	
Labour	Daniel Jenkins	1,295	34.9	+9.0
Liberal Democrats	Robin Kelly	538	14.5	
Reform	Michael Pastor	325	8.8	
Turnout		11,125	33.0	−5.73
Conservative **hold**		Swing		
Conservative **hold**		Swing		
Conservative **hold**		Swing		

=== Blendon and Penhill ===
Blendon and Penhill (3 seats)
Party	Candidate	Votes	%	±%
**Conservative**	**Patrick Adams**	**2,267**	**64.8**	
**Conservative**	**Nick O'Hare***	**2,040**	**58.3**	**−4.5**
**Conservative**	**David Leaf***	**2,012**	**57.5**	**−3.6**
Labour	Emma Francis	1,322	37.8	
Labour	Ahmad Brooke	1,099	31.4	
Labour	Floyd Millen	1,092	31.2	
Liberal Democrats	Bruce Meredeen	402	11.5	
Reform	Marc Mason	262	7.5	
Turnout		10,496	33.2	−4.49
Conservative **hold**		Swing		
Conservative **hold**		Swing		
Conservative **hold**		Swing		

=== Crayford ===
Crayford (3 seats)
Party	Candidate	Votes	%	±%
**Conservative**	**Melvin Seymour***	**1,890**	**55.5**	**+5.0**
**Conservative**	**Geraldine Lucia-Hennis***	**1,872**	**55.0**	**+5.6**
**Conservative**	**Felix Di Netimah**	**1,717**	**50.5**	
Labour	Abi Johnson	1,628	47.8	
Labour	Anthony Riches	1,554	45.7	
Labour	Nick Hair	1,549	45.5	
Turnout		10,210	32.6	−2.54
Conservative **hold**		Swing		
Conservative **hold**		Swing		
Conservative **hold**		Swing		

=== Crook Log ===
Crook Log (3 seats)
Party	Candidate	Votes	%	±%
**Conservative**	**Teresa O'Neill***	**2,317**	**59.1**	**−0.7**
**Conservative**	**Janice Ward Wilson**	**2,154**	**54.9**	
**Conservative**	**Christopher Taylor**	**2,077**	**53.0**	
Labour	Liam Davies	1,684	43.0	
Labour	Janet White	1,491	38.0	
Labour	Timothy Nicholls	1,418	36.2	
Liberal Democrats	Zoe Brooks	621	15.8	
Turnout		11,762	36.1	−4.79%
Conservative **hold**		Swing		
Conservative **hold**		Swing		
Conservative **hold**		Swing		

=== East Wickham ===
East Wickham (3 seats)
Party	Candidate	Votes	%	±%
**Conservative**	**Steven Hall***	**1,967**	**53.1**	**−2.2**
**Conservative**	**Caroline Newton***	**1,794**	**48.5**	**−3.8**
**Conservative**	**Christine Catterall***	**1,774**	**47.9**	**−3.7**
Labour	Donna Briant	1,733	46.8	
Labour	Claire Hedderman	1,609	43.5	
Labour	Dave Tingle	1,467	39.6	
Liberal Democrats	Sean Ash	506	13.7	
British Democrats	Michael Jones	253	6.8	−2.1
Turnout		11,103	34.5	−2.90%
Conservative **hold**		Swing		
Conservative **hold**		Swing		
Conservative **hold**		Swing		

=== Erith ===
Erith (2 seats)
Party	Candidate	Votes	%	±%
**Labour**	**Christopher Ball**	**1,512**	**70.1**	
**Labour**	**Nicola Taylor***	**1,469**	**68.1**	**+5.7**
Conservative	David Li	670	31.1	
Conservative	Masbah Khan	664	30.8	
Turnout		4,315	27.9	−4.52
Labour **hold**		Swing		
Labour **hold**		Swing		

=== Falconwood and Welling ===
Falconwood and Welling (3 seats)
Party	Candidate	Votes	%	±%
**Conservative**	**Nigel Betts***	**2,047**	**57.7**	**+1.1**
**Conservative**	**Andrew Curtois**	**1,894**	**53.4**	
**Conservative**	**Frazer Brooks**	**1,795**	**50.6**	
Labour	Sarah Miller	1,494	42.1	
Labour	Jeremy Fosten	1,360	38.3	
Labour	Stephen Perfect	1,273	35.9	
Green	Elisabeth Radbon	538	15.2	+6.2
Reform	Marian Newton	245	6.9	
Turnout		10,646	32.0	−7.75%
Conservative **hold**		Swing		
Conservative **hold**		Swing		
Conservative **hold**		Swing		

=== Longlands ===
Longlands (2 seats)
Party	Candidate	Votes	%	±%
**Conservative**	**Lisa-Jane Moore***	**1,504**	**57.4**	**−4.7**
**Conservative**	**Andy Dourmoush***	**1,347**	**51.4**	**−1.2**
Labour	Teresa Gray	1,029	39.3	
Labour	Anashua Davies	1,014	38.7	
Liberal Democrats	Oliver Brooks	346	13.2	
Turnout		5,240	36.6	−4.69%
Conservative **hold**		Swing		
Conservative **hold**		Swing		

=== Northumberland Heath ===
Northumberland Heath (2 seats)
Party	Candidate	Votes	%	±%
**Labour**	**Baljeet Gill**	**1,361**	**51.8**	
**Labour**	**Wendy Perfect***	**1,345**	**51.2**	**+6.7**
Conservative	Aaron Newbury	1,157	44.0	
Conservative	Duwayne Brooks	1,146	43.6	
Liberal Democrats	Paul Bargery	248	9.4	+2.2
Turnout		5,257	35.6	−2.76
Labour **hold**		Swing		
Labour **gain** from Conservative		Swing		

=== Sidcup ===
Sidcup (3 seats)
Party	Candidate	Votes	%	±%
**Conservative**	**June Slaughter***	**1,828**	**51.3**	**−4.2**
**Conservative**	**Cheryl Bacon***	**1,818**	**51.1**	**−8.3**
**Conservative**	**Richard Diment***	**1,815**	**51.0**	**−2.0**
Labour	Paul Hinkley	1,211	34.0	
Labour	Tonya Kelsey	1,204	33.8	
Labour	Ben Nottle	1,082	30.4	
Liberal Democrats	Paul Hurren	484	13.6	
Liberal Democrats	Simone Reynolds	472	13.3	+4.9
Liberal Democrats	David Sexton	407	11.4	+5.5
Independent	Dimitri Shvorob	261	7.3	
SDP	Laurence Williams	100	2.8	+0.9
Turnout		10,682	33.1	−5.83
Conservative **hold**		Swing		
Conservative **hold**		Swing		
Conservative **hold**		Swing		

=== Slade Green and Northend ===
Slade Green and Northend (2 seats)
Party	Candidate	Votes	%	±%
**Labour**	**Stefano Borella***	**1,220**	**62.6**	**+8.7**
**Labour**	**Anna Day**	**1,213**	**62.3**	
Conservative	Michael Gillespie	764	39.2	
Conservative	Mandy Brinkhurst	700	35.9	
Turnout		3,897	24.3	−5.46
Labour **hold**		Swing		
Labour **hold**		Swing		

=== St Mary's and St James ===
St Mary's and St James (2 seats)
Party	Candidate	Votes	%	±%
**Conservative**	**Kurtis Christoforides**	**1,591**	**58.3**	
**Conservative**	**Cameron Smith**	**1,506**	**55.2**	
Labour	Sylvia Malt	939	34.4	
Labour	John Husband	884	32.4	
Liberal Democrats	David McBride	347	12.7	
Reform	Linda Purcell	125	4.6	
CPA	Carol Valinejad	64	2.3	
Turnout		5,456	35.2	−5.20
Conservative **hold**		Swing		
Conservative **hold**		Swing		

=== Thamesmead East ===
Thamesmead East (3 seats)
Party	Candidate	Votes	%	±%
**Labour**	**Larry Ferguson**	**1,703**	**74.6**	
**Labour**	**Zainab Asunramu**	**1,678**	**73.5**	
**Labour**	**Mabel Ogundayo***	**1,661**	**72.8**	**+6.0**
Conservative	Graham Moon	586	25.7	
Conservative	Natalie Price	558	24.5	
Conservative	Rajinder Tumber	462	20.2	
Liberal Democrats	Doro Oddiri	198	8.7	
Turnout		6,846	24.4	−4.95
Labour **hold**		Swing		
Labour **hold**		Swing		
Labour **hold**		Swing		

=== West Heath ===
West Heath (3 seats)
Party	Candidate	Votes	%	±%
**Conservative**	**Peter Reader***	**2,389**	**59.3**	**+0.6**
**Conservative**	**John Davey***	**2,328**	**57.8**	**+1.3**
**Conservative**	**Philip Read***	**2,283**	**56.7**	**+1.5**
Labour	Sam Marchant	1,730	43.0	
Labour	Jay Dominy	1,678	41.7	
Labour	Victoria Akintomide-Akinwamide	1,669	41.5	
Turnout		12,077	36.0	−4.69
Conservative **hold**		Swing		
Conservative **hold**		Swing		
Conservative **hold**		Swing		

On 11 October 2022, Cllr John Davey was suspended by the Conservative Party following offensive tweets about former British-Iranian prisoner, Nazanin Zaghari-Ratcliffe.

== By-elections ==
=== Belvedere ===
Belvedere by-election: 17 October 2024
Party	Candidate	Votes	%	±%
Labour	Jeremy Fosten	862	38.5	–14.4
Conservative	Christine Bishop	713	31.9	–1.3
Reform	Michael Pastor	378	16.9	N/A
Green	Sarah Barry	157	7.0	–6.9
Liberal Democrats	David McBride	127	5.7	N/A
Majority		149	6.6	N/A
Turnout		2,239	18.5	–12.8
Registered electors		12,093		
Labour hold		Swing	▼6.6	
