= Family policy =

Family policy is a social policy regarding the family.

== Family policy by country ==
- Family policy in Hungary
- Family policy in Japan
- Family policy in Iceland
- Family policy in Ireland
- Family policy in the Netherlands
- Family policy in Spain
- Family policy in the United Kingdom
