= Louie French =

British politician (born 1988)

Louie French MP
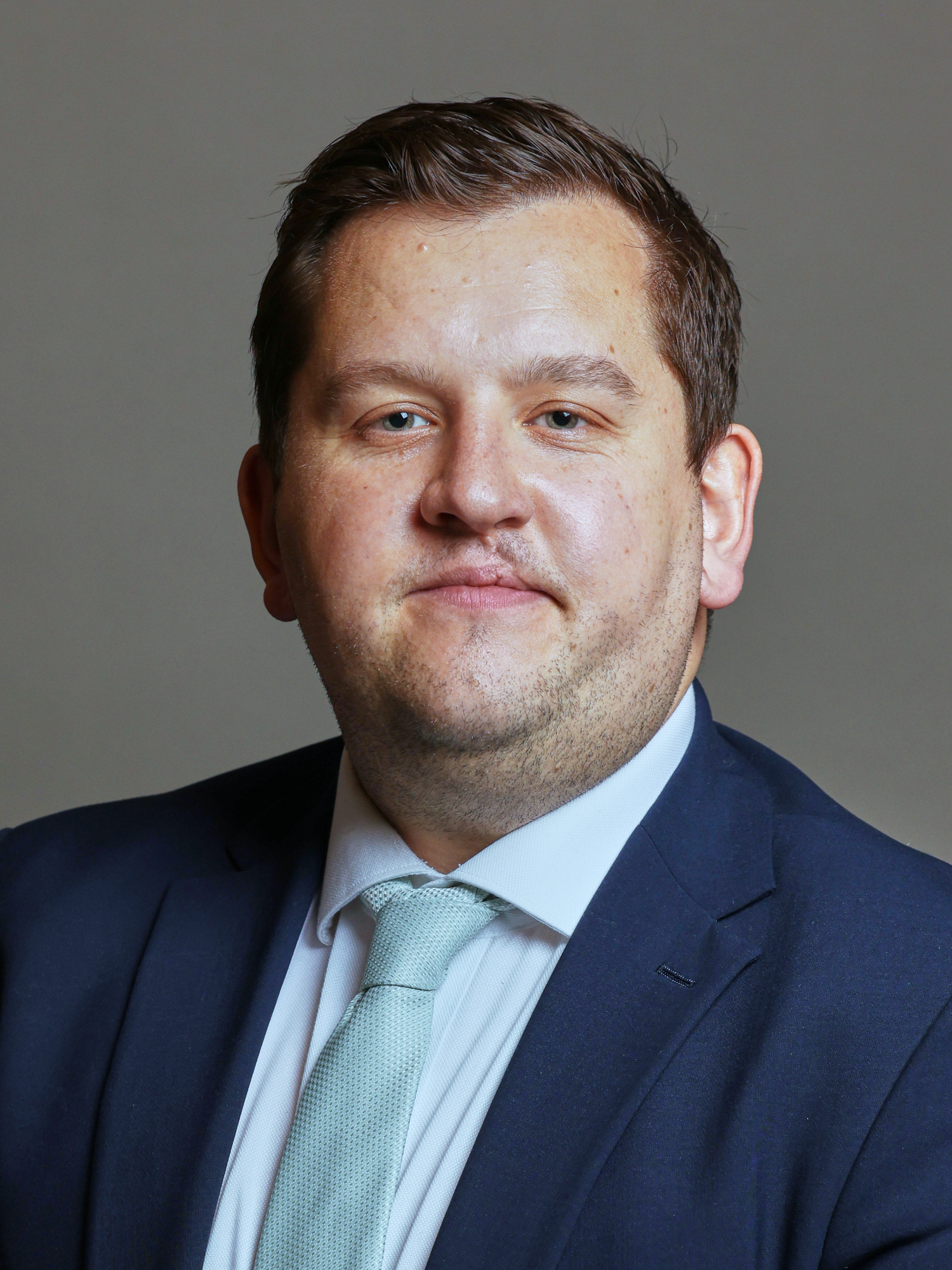
- Official portrait, 2021

Shadow Minister for Culture, Media and Sport
- Incumbent
- Assumed office 19 July 2024
- Leader: Rishi Sunak; Kemi Badenoch
- Preceded by: Stephanie Peacock

Member of Parliament for Old Bexley and Sidcup
- Incumbent
- Assumed office 2 December 2021
- Preceded by: James Brokenshire
- Majority: 3,548 (7.4%)

Member of Bexley London Borough Council for Falconwood & Welling
- In office 23 May 2014 – 5 May 2022

Personal details
- Born: Louie Thomas French; 14 February 1988 (age 38) Greenwich, London, England
- Party: Conservative
- Education: Blackfen School for Girls
- Occupation: Politician, former portfolio manager
- Website: www.louiefrench.org.uk

Louie Thomas French (born 14 February 1988) is a British Conservative Party politician who has been the Member of Parliament (MP) for Old Bexley and Sidcup since the 2021 by-election. He was a councillor on Bexley London Borough Council from 2014 until 2022.

Prior to his parliamentary career, he worked as a lead portfolio manager for the financial planning and investment firm Tilney. He has been Shadow Minister for Culture, Media and Sport since July 2024.

== Early life and career ==
Louie French was born on 14 February 1988 in Greenwich, and grew up in Welling and Sidcup. He attended Blackfen School for Girls, which has a mixed sixth form.

He was elected as a Conservative councillor for the Falconwood and Welling ward in the 2014 Bexley Borough Council election and was re-elected in 2018. Alongside his role as councillor, he was also a senior research analyst and later lead portfolio manager for sustainable portfolios and services for the financial planning and investment firm Tilney.

== Parliamentary career ==
At the 2019 general election, French stood as the Conservative candidate in Eltham, coming second with 39.7% of the vote behind the incumbent Labour MP Clive Efford.

French was selected as the Conservative candidate for the 2021 Old Bexley and Sidcup by-election on 30 October 2021 which was called following the death of the incumbent Conservative MP James Brokenshire from lung cancer on 7 October 2021. French was elected to Parliament as MP for Old Bexley and Sidcup with 51.5% of the vote and a majority of 4,478.

French pledged to focus on increasing the number of police officers, investment in schools and hospitals, and protecting green spaces in the constituency. He had also pledged to leave his job as a lead portfolio manager for Tilney if he was elected as MP which he reported doing so in his first week. During the campaign, he had initially said that he would continue at Tilney as MP but later ruled it out.

He was one of 99 Conservative MPs to vote against COVID passes in England in December 2021.

French made his maiden speech on 18 January 2022, in which he paid tribute to James Brokenshire. He has been a member of the Public Accounts Committee since March 2022. He endorsed Rishi Sunak in the July–September 2022 Conservative Party leadership election.

At the 2024 general election, French was re-elected as MP for Old Bexley and Sidcup with a decreased vote share of 37.6% and a decreased majority of 3,548.

Parliament of the United Kingdom
Preceded by James Brokenshire	Member of Parliament for Old Bexley and Sidcup; 2021–present	Incumbent
