= Laura Trott =

Laura Trott may refer to:

- Laura Kenny (née Trott; born 1992), British track and road cyclist
- Laura Trott (politician) (born 1984), British Conservative Party politician
