= Brandon Lewis =

British politician (born 1971)

The Right Honourable Sir Brandon Lewis CBE
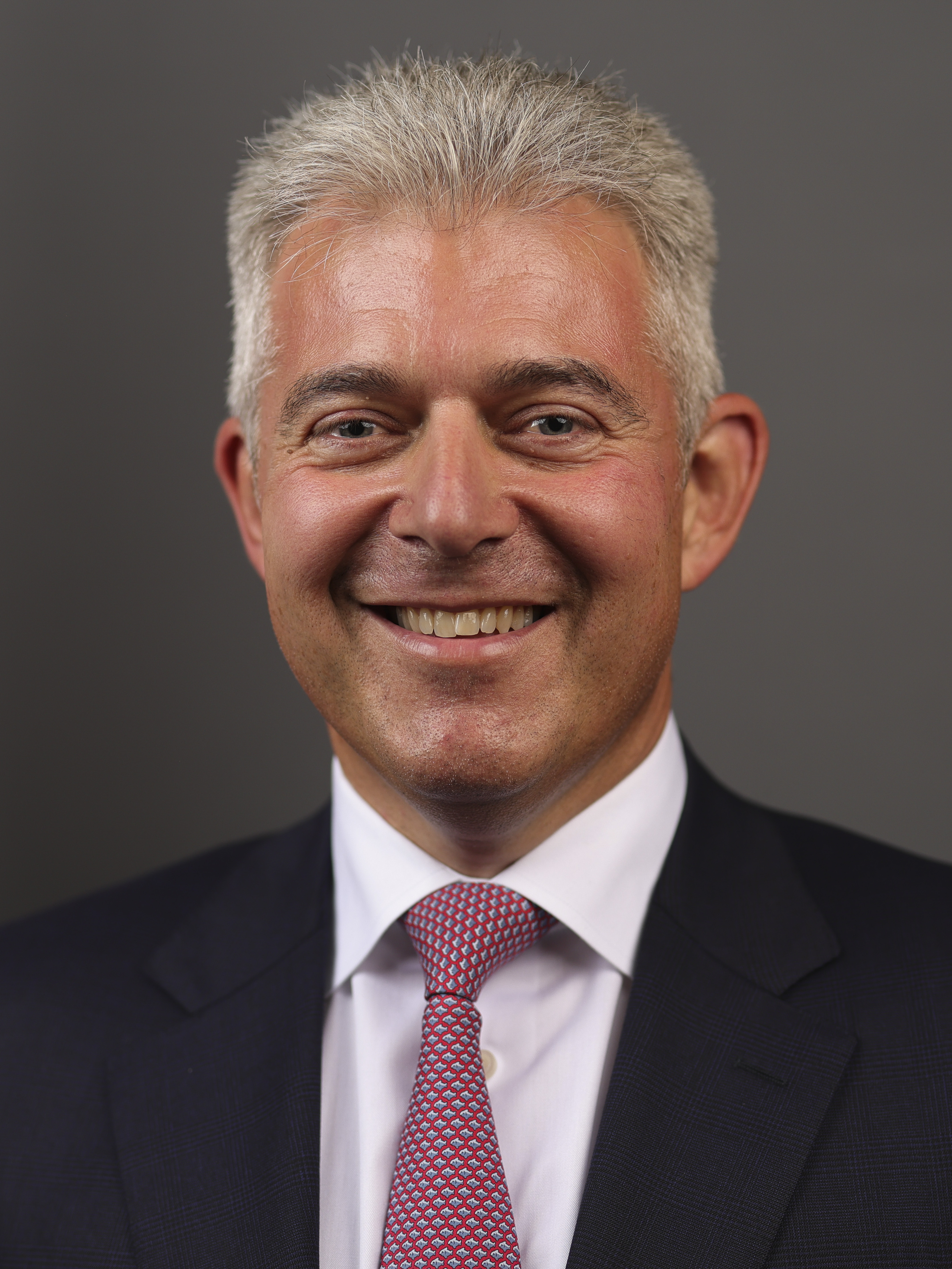
- Official portrait, 2022

Secretary of State for Justice; Lord Chancellor
- In office 6 September 2022 – 25 October 2022
- Prime Minister: Liz Truss
- Preceded by: Dominic Raab
- Succeeded by: Dominic Raab

Secretary of State for Northern Ireland
- In office 13 February 2020 – 7 July 2022
- Prime Minister: Boris Johnson
- Preceded by: Julian Smith
- Succeeded by: Shailesh Vara

Minister of State for Security and Deputy for EU Exit and No Deal Preparation
- In office 24 July 2019 – 13 February 2020
- Prime Minister: Boris Johnson
- Preceded by: Ben Wallace (Note: As Minister of State for Security and Economic Crime.)
- Succeeded by: James Brokenshire (Note: As Minister of State for Security.)

Chairman of the Conservative Party
- In office 8 January 2018 – 24 July 2019
- Leader: Theresa May
- Preceded by: Patrick McLoughlin
- Succeeded by: James Cleverly

Minister without Portfolio
- In office 8 January 2018 – 24 July 2019
- Prime Minister: Theresa May
- Preceded by: Robert Halfon (Note: Office vacant between 17 July 2016 and 8 January 2018.)
- Succeeded by: James Cleverly

Minister of State for Immigration
- In office 11 June 2017 – 8 January 2018
- Prime Minister: Theresa May
- Preceded by: Robert Goodwill
- Succeeded by: Caroline Nokes

Minister of State for Policing and the Fire Service
- In office 16 July 2016 – 11 June 2017
- Prime Minister: Theresa May
- Preceded by: Mike Penning
- Succeeded by: Nick Hurd

Minister of State for Housing and Planning (Note: Known as Minister of State for Housing and Local Government from 2014 to 2015.)
- In office 15 July 2014 – 16 July 2016
- Prime Minister: David Cameron
- Preceded by: Kris Hopkins
- Succeeded by: Gavin Barwell

Parliamentary Under-Secretary of State for Communities and Local Government
- In office 4 September 2012 – 15 July 2014
- Prime Minister: David Cameron
- Preceded by: Bob Neill
- Succeeded by: Kris Hopkins

Member of Parliament for Great Yarmouth
- In office 6 May 2010 – 30 May 2024
- Preceded by: Tony Wright
- Succeeded by: Rupert Lowe
Local government offices
Leader of Brentwood Borough Council
In office 23 June 2004 – 18 March 2009
Preceded by	Vicky Cook
Succeeded by	Louise McKinlay
Member of Brentwood Borough Council for Hutton South
In office 7 May 1998 – 2009
Preceded by	E. Nicholson
Succeeded by	Roger Hirst

Personal details
- Born: Brandon Kenneth Lewis; 20 June 1971 (age 55) Harold Wood, London, England
- Party: Conservative
- Spouse: Justine Rappolt (m. 1999)
- Children: 2
- Education: University of Buckingham (BSc, LLB); King's College London (LLM)
- Website: brandonlewis.co.uk

Sir Brandon Kenneth Lewis (born 20 June 1971) is a British politician who served as Secretary of State for Justice and Lord Chancellor from September to October 2022. He previously served as Chairman of the Conservative Party from 2018 to 2019 and Secretary of State for Northern Ireland from 2020 to 2022. A member of the Conservative Party, he was Member of Parliament (MP) for Great Yarmouth from 2010 to 2024.

Born in Harold Wood, Lewis attended the independent Forest School. He studied economics at the University of Buckingham, switching to King's College London for his master's degree. He then began a career as a barrister. He was a councillor on Brentwood Borough Council from 1998 to 2009 and served as leader of the council from 2004 to 2009. He was elected as the MP for Great Yarmouth at the 2010 general election.

Lewis served under Prime Minister David Cameron as Parliamentary Under-Secretary of State for Communities and Local Government from 2012 to 2014 and Minister of State for Housing and Planning from 2014 to 2016. Lewis served under Cameron’s successor, Theresa May, as Minister of State for Policing and the Fire Service from 2016 to 2017 and Minister of State for Immigration from 2017 to 2018. He was appointed to May’s Cabinet as Chairman of the Conservative Party and Minister without Portfolio in the 2018 cabinet reshuffle. After May resigned in 2019, Lewis was appointed Minister of State for Security and Deputy for EU Exit and No Deal Preparation by Prime Minister Boris Johnson. In the 2020 cabinet reshuffle, he was promoted by Johnson to Secretary of State for Northern Ireland. He resigned from this post during the July 2022 government crisis. Following the appointment of Liz Truss as Prime Minister, Lewis was appointed as Lord Chancellor and Secretary of State for Justice. He returned to the backbenches the following month after being dismissed by Prime Minister Rishi Sunak and stood down from parliament at the 2024 general election.

== Early life and career ==
Lewis was born on 20 June 1971 in Harold Wood in London. He was educated at Forest School in Walthamstow. He received a BSc degree in Economics from the University of Buckingham, an LLB honours degree in Law from the same institution, and an LLM in commercial law from King's College London. He was called to the bar by the Inner Temple.

He was a director of Woodlands Schools Limited, a provider of private primary schools based in Hutton, Essex, until September 2012 when he resigned his position.

== Local government ==
In May 1998 Lewis was first elected as a representative of the Conservative Party when he became a Borough Councillor for Hutton South on Brentwood Borough Council.

He stood unsuccessfully as the Conservative Party candidate for election in the Sherwood constituency in the 2001 general election; he lost to Paddy Tipping, the Labour Party candidate, with 34% of the vote.

He was re-elected to Brentwood Borough Council 2002 and 2006 with an increased vote share. He later became Conservative Group leader in 2002 and leader of the council in 2004, after his party took control of the local authority. He remained in this position until 2009, when he resigned as a councillor in Essex to focus on seeking election as an MP in Norfolk.

During his time as leader of the council he co-hosted The Eric and Brandon Show with local MP Eric Pickles on Phoenix FM, a local radio station in Brentwood.

== Parliamentary career ==
=== Early parliamentary career ===
In 2006, Lewis was selected as Conservative prospective parliamentary candidate in the Great Yarmouth constituency; he was elected at the 2010 general election, defeating sitting Labour MP Tony Wright with a majority of just over 4000 – a swing to the Conservatives of 8.7% in the seat which was number 66 on their list of target seats. Lewis had stood for Parliament on a "clean expenses pledge", pledging to be "completely open about my expenses".

Lewis served on the Work and Pensions Select Committee and the Regulatory Reform Select Committee from his election until 2012. He has been a member of a number of all-party parliamentary groups, including time as the chair of the Local Growth group and co-chair of a group discussing coastal erosion. A report by the Local Growth group in September 2012, when it was chaired by Lewis, criticised the Government for an "uncoordinated" approach to its Local Enterprise Partnership policy which, according to Lewis, left "gaps and weaknesses".

In 2010–2011 Lewis claimed just over £15,000 in accommodation expenses and in 2011–12 and 2012–13 he claimed just under £21,500 for accommodation.

Lewis ran a variety of campaigns as MP for Great Yarmouth, including cutting fuel duty, protecting Norfolk bus services, and improving Great Yarmouth railway station.

=== Early ministerial career ===
In September 2012 Lewis was appointed Parliamentary Under-Secretary of State at the Department for Communities and Local Government, working under Eric Pickles. In July 2014, Lewis was promoted to Minister of State for Housing and Planning, when the prime minister brought the portfolios of Housing and Planning together for the first time under his premiership. He said that there had been a "dramatic swing" in public opinion – with almost half of people now in favour of new housing in their area. This related to the new National Planning Policy Framework, the primary framework for town planning in the country, which some argued made it substantially easier for developers to build on greenfield land.

As the local MP, Lewis declined initially to support local campaigners who were fighting against the Conservative run county council's controversial plans for the proposed King's Lynn incinerator. By 2012 he had joined all fellow local MPs in expressing concern with the proposal and, after a change in leadership of the county council, the plans for the incinerator were dropped in 2014.

Lewis previously sat on the House of Commons Speaker's Committee on the Electoral Commission.

In 2013 Lewis was critical of local councils, including many Conservative run councils, planning council tax rises in 2013 against the wishes of the Government, saying that there was "still massive scope" for councils to cut "waste and inefficiency". He has also criticised the Local Government Association for producing proposals to give local councils more freedom over their levels of council tax in the future.

Labour MPs called upon IPSA to investigate whether Lewis was using taxpayer funds for inappropriate political purposes after it was revealed that he had claimed £37,000 for "research briefing and other parliamentary associated assistance" to a political campaign consultancy.

In August 2015, it was reported that Lewis claimed £31,000 of hotel expenses over a two-year period following stays at the Park Plaza hotel near Parliament. Lewis stated that he opted to stay in London rather than travel home to Essex and all the claims complied with parliamentary rules.

He supported the United Kingdom remaining a member of the European Union in the 2016 EU membership referendum. In July 2016, Lewis was promoted to be the minister of state for the Home Office with a portfolio including Police and Fire services, as well as Europol and Interpol.

Following the Grenfell disaster, Lewis was criticised for having rejected calls to increase fire safety regulations in his former role as housing minister. He had argued that legislating to mandate sprinklers in high rise buildings was the wrong approach as water-based sprinklers were inappropriate for electrical fires.

=== Chairman of the Conservative Party ===
In a January 2018 cabinet reshuffle, Lewis was promoted to Chairman of the Conservative Party, succeeding Patrick McLoughlin. Lewis was also appointed Minister without Portfolio.

On 19 July, Government Chief Whip Julian Smith was reported to be resisting calls to resign his position, following allegations that he had instructed five Conservative Party MPs to break "pairing" agreements in an important parliamentary vote the previous day. Lewis was the only one to comply with the instruction. Subsequent reports indicated that Smith had given similar instructions to five MPs, but that Lewis had been the only one willing to break what one commentator described later as "a centuries old 'code of honour'". Before it became known that the affair had involved approaches by Smith to more than one MP, the prime minister Theresa May backed Lewis by stating that "The breaking of the pair was done in error. It wasn't good enough and will not be repeated."

In 2019, Lewis voted for May's Brexit withdrawal agreement.

In July 2019, Lewis was appointed Minister of State for Security and Deputy for EU Exit and No Deal Preparation by new Prime Minister Boris Johnson.

=== Secretary of State for Northern Ireland ===
In February 2020 he moved to be the secretary of state for Northern Ireland as part of a cabinet reshuffle under Johnson.

He robustly defended the Government's support for the Northern Ireland Protocol. Lewis also responded to the COVID-19 pandemic in Northern Ireland.

In September 2020, Lewis provoked controversy when he conceded that a bill designed to amend the United Kingdom's withdrawal agreement with the European Union would "break international law" in a "specific and limited way".

On 6 July 2022, Lewis told Johnson he needed to step down from office due to a loss in support, during the July 2022 government crisis. Lewis resigned on 7 July, after turning down offers of promotion from Johnson, saying the Government was no longer upholding "honesty, integrity and mutual respect".

=== Between Ministries ===
Lewis ran Nadhim Zahawi's campaign in the July–September 2022 Conservative Party leadership election. After Zahawi was eliminated from the contest, Lewis endorsed Liz Truss's leadership bid.

=== Lord Chancellor and Secretary of State for Justice ===
Lewis was appointed Lord Chancellor and Secretary of State for Justice on 6 September 2022 after Liz Truss became the prime minister.

On 29 September, Lewis negotiated a deal with the Criminal Bar Association to end the 2022 British barristers' industrial action. The deal included a 15% increase in legal aid fees to cases in the Crown Court, £3,000,000 of funding for case preparation and £4,000,000 for prerecorded cross-examinations of vulnerable victims and witnesses. On 10 October, 57% of barristers voted to end the strike and Crown Court cases began to be heard as normal from 11 October.

=== Return to the backbenches ===
On 25 October 2022, Lewis resigned from the front bench upon the ascension of Rishi Sunak to the Prime Ministership and returned to the backbenches. He was succeeded as Justice Secretary by Dominic Raab.

Lewis was criticised in a September 2023 Eastern Daily Express article for charging nearly £10,000 in expenses for social media content produced by external production companies Westminster Digital and Millbank Creative.

In October 2023, Lewis was appointed to a part-time role as leader of the Chair's Advisory Council of the international investment firm LetterOne.

In March 2024, Lewis announced he would not seek re-election at the 2024 general election. Lewis took five new part-time jobs paying £410,000 a year while still an MP.

== Personal life ==
Lewis married Justine Rappolt in 1999; the couple have two children. He completed the London Marathon in 2005 and 2008 and lists triathlon as an interest. He is a member of the Carlton Club.

In 2023, Lewis told GB News that since turning 50 he had lost nearly five stone, (approximately 30 Kg) which he credited to beating a chocolate addiction.

== Honours ==
On 29 September 2016, Lewis was sworn in to the Privy Council, giving him the honorific title "The Right Honourable" for life. In the 2019 Prime Minister's Resignation Honours, he was appointed Commander of the Order of the British Empire (CBE) for political and public service in September 2019.

Lewis was knighted on 16 June 2023 in the 2023 Political Honours for public and political service.

== Notes ==
Political offices
Preceded by Vicky Cook	Leader of Brentwood Borough Council; 2004–2009	Succeeded by Louise McKinlay
Preceded by Bob Neill	Parliamentary Under-Secretary of State for Communities and Local Government; 2012–2014	Succeeded by Kris Hopkins
Preceded by Kris Hopkins	Minister of State for Housing and Local Government; 2014–2015	Succeeded by Himself as Minister of State for Housing and Planning
Preceded by Himself as Minister of State for Housing and Local Government	Minister of State for Housing and Planning; 2015–2016	Succeeded by Gavin Barwell
Preceded by Mike Penning as Minister of State for Policing	Minister of State for Policing and the Fire Service; 2016–2017	Succeeded by Nick Hurd
Preceded by Robert Goodwill	Minister of State for Immigration; 2017–2018	Succeeded by Caroline Nokes
Vacant Title last held by Robert Halfon	Minister without Portfolio; 2018–2019	Succeeded by James Cleverly
Preceded by Ben Wallace as Minister of State for Security and Economic Crime	Minister of State for Security and Deputy for EU Exit and No Deal Preparation; 2019–2020	Succeeded by James Brokenshire as Minister of State for Security
Preceded by Julian Smith	Secretary of State for Northern Ireland; 2020–2022	Succeeded by Shailesh Vara
Preceded by Dominic Raab	Secretary of State for Justice; 2022	Succeeded by Dominic Raab
Preceded by Dominic Raab	Lord High Chancellor of Great Britain; 2022	Succeeded by Dominic Raab
Parliament of the United Kingdom
Preceded by Tony Wright	Member of Parliament for Great Yarmouth; 2010–2024	Succeeded by Rupert Lowe
Party political offices
Preceded by Sir Patrick McLoughlin	Chairman of the Conservative Party; 2018–2019	Succeeded by James Cleverly
