= Laura Trott (politician) =

British politician (born 1984)

The Right Honourable Laura Trott MBE MP
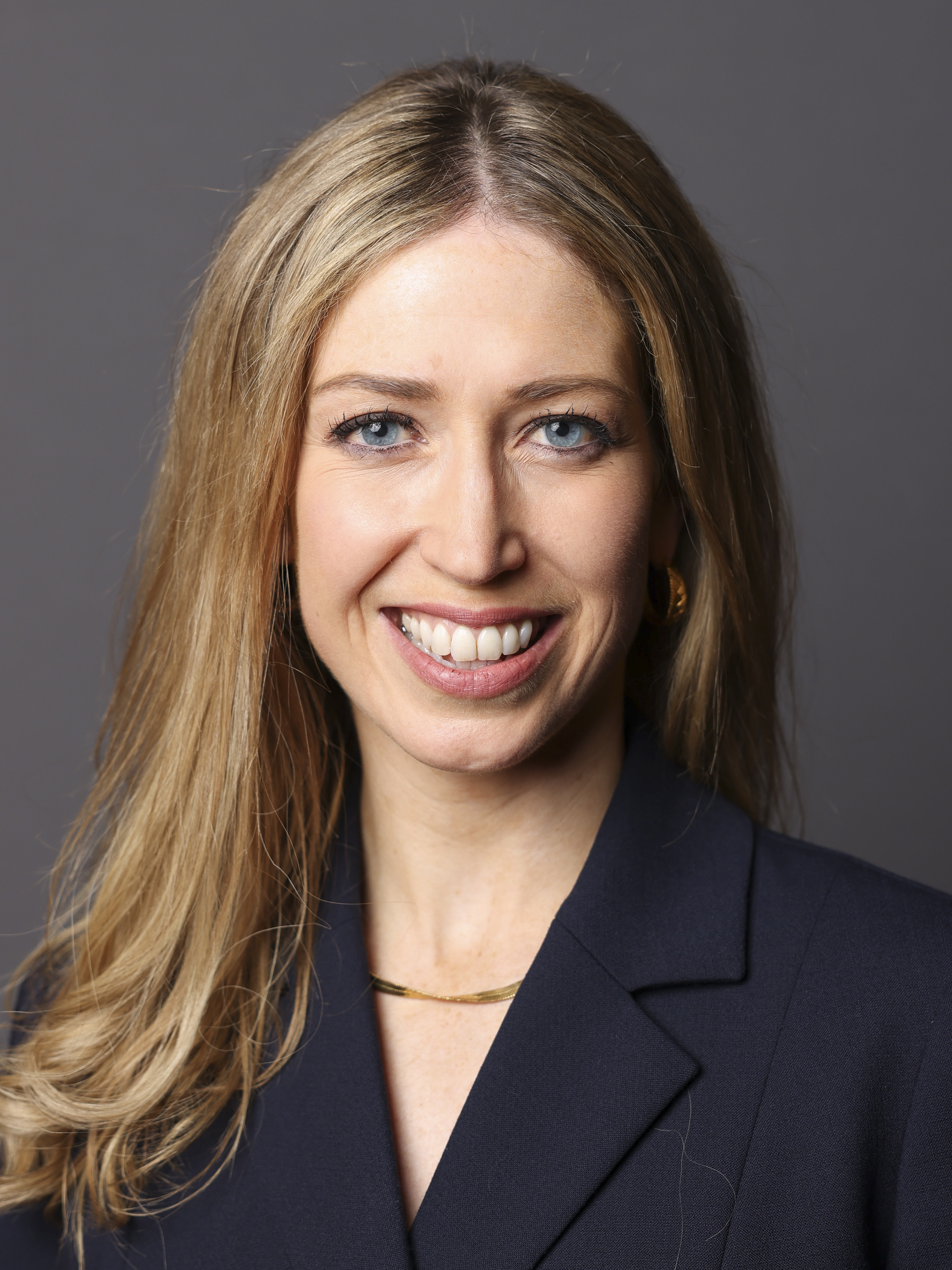
- Official portrait, 2023

Shadow Secretary of State for Education
- Incumbent
- Assumed office 4 November 2024
- Leader: Kemi Badenoch
- Preceded by: Damian Hinds

Shadow Chief Secretary to the Treasury
- In office 8 July 2024 – 4 November 2024
- Leader: Rishi Sunak
- Preceded by: Darren Jones
- Succeeded by: Richard Fuller

Chief Secretary to the Treasury
- In office 13 November 2023 – 5 July 2024
- Prime Minister: Rishi Sunak
- Preceded by: John Glen
- Succeeded by: Darren Jones

Parliamentary Under-Secretary of State for Pensions
- In office 27 October 2022 – 13 November 2023
- Prime Minister: Rishi Sunak
- Preceded by: Alex Burghart
- Succeeded by: Paul Maynard

Member of Parliament for Sevenoaks
- Incumbent
- Assumed office 12 December 2019
- Preceded by: Michael Fallon
- Majority: 5,440 (10.9%)

Personal details
- Born: Laura Trott; 7 December 1984 (age 41) Oxted, Surrey, England
- Party: Conservative
- Spouse: Bahador Mahvelati
- Children: 3
- Education: Oxted School
- Alma mater: Pembroke College, Oxford (BA)
- Website: www.lauratrott.org.uk

Laura Trott (born 7 December 1984) is a British politician currently serving as Shadow Education Secretary since November 2024. She previously served as Shadow Chief Secretary to the Treasury from July to November 2024. A member of the Conservative Party, she has been the Member of Parliament (MP) for Sevenoaks since 2019.

Born in Oxted, Trott attended Oxted School and later studied history and economics at the University of Oxford. She worked as a special adviser between 2009 and 2016, before becoming a partner at Portland Communications. Trott joined the Conservative Party in her teens, and was a councillor for the party on Camden London Borough Council between 2010 and 2014. She was elected to the House of Commons at the 2019 general election for Sevenoaks, becoming the first woman to represent the constituency. She was later appointed a Parliamentary Private Secretary (PPS) to the Department for Transport, before resigning during the July 2022 government crisis.

Trott endorsed Rishi Sunak in his unsuccessful bid for party leader in the July–September 2022 Conservative Party leadership election. She later endorsed his successful bid in the October 2022 Conservative Party leadership election, and was appointed to the government frontbench as Parliamentary Under-Secretary of State for Pensions in Sunak's government after he became Prime Minister in the same month. In the November 2023 cabinet reshuffle, she was promoted to the cabinet as Chief Secretary to the Treasury. After the defeat of the Conservative Party in the 2024 general election, Trott became Shadow Chief Secretary to the Treasury in Sunak's shadow cabinet.

== Early life and education ==
Laura Trott was born on 7 December 1984 in Oxted. She attended Oxted School before studying history and economics at the University of Oxford as an undergraduate student of Pembroke College, Oxford. Trott joined the Conservative Party in her teens and has cited former prime minister John Major as an early influence to join politics.

== Career ==
After university, Trott was employed as a strategy consultant at Booz & Company. Trott is an ambassador for the Sutton Trust, an educational charity.

Trott served as a Conservative Party Councillor for Frognal and Fitzjohns on Camden London Borough Council between 2010 and 2014.

In January 2009, she became a political adviser for the Conservatives, before becoming a special adviser to then Minister for the Cabinet Office Francis Maude in May 2010 with the remit of political policy and media, and was then promoted to chief of staff. She was subsequently appointed as a political adviser in the Number 10 Policy Unit, responsible for education and family policy under then Prime Minister David Cameron. Trott was credited for formulating the party's tax-free childcare policy.

After the 2015 general election, Trott was promoted to director of strategic communication. In 2016, she was appointed a Member of the Order of the British Empire (MBE) in Cameron's Resignation Honours for her political and public service. After the election of Prime Minister Theresa May, she left government service and became a partner at the political consultancy and public relations firm Portland Communications in September 2017.

== Parliamentary career ==
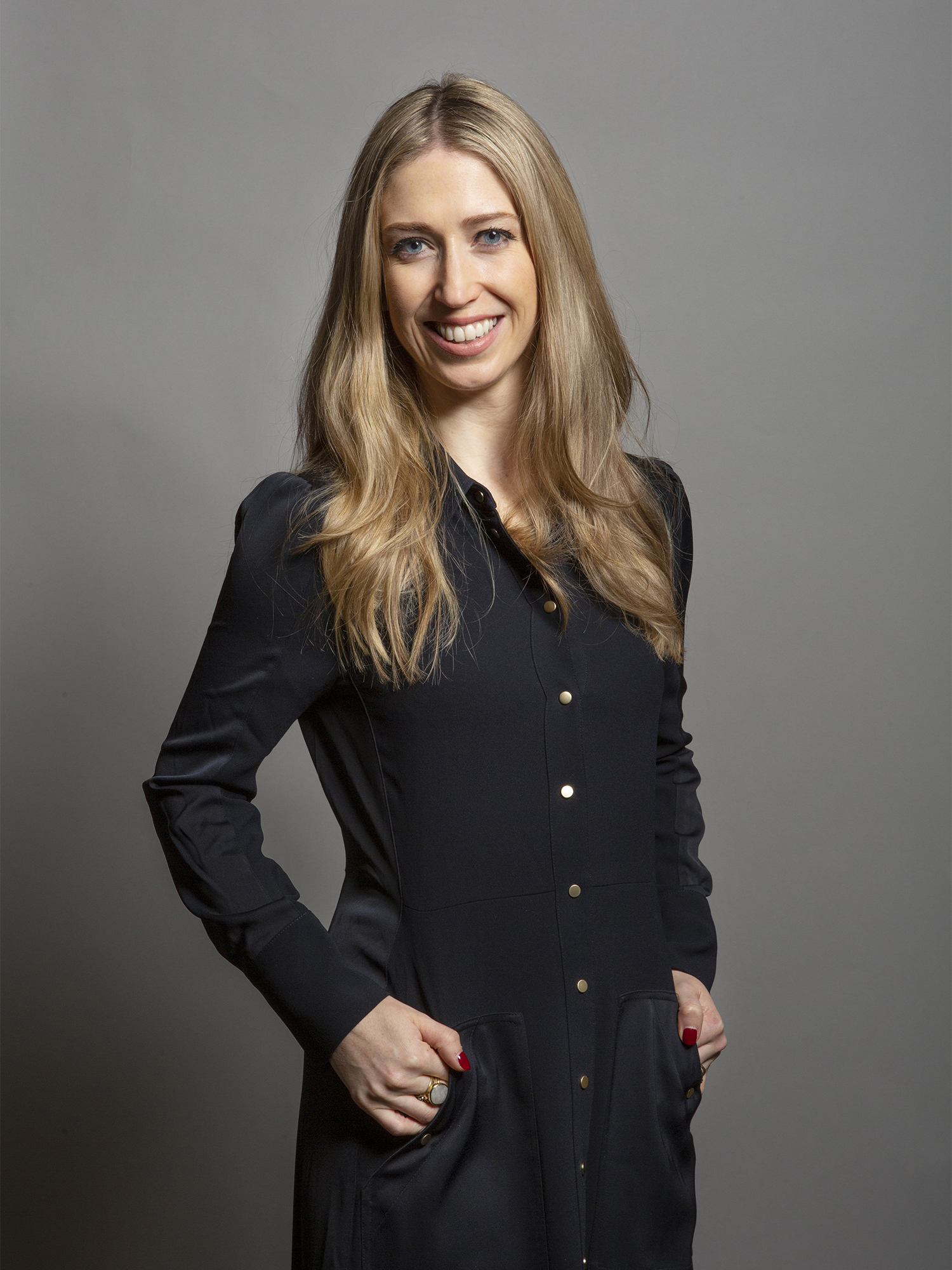
Official portrait, 2019

=== Early career ===
Trott was selected as the Conservative candidate for Sevenoaks in Kent on 10 November 2019, as a resident of Balham which is outside of the constituency. It is considered as a safe Conservative seat, having elected a member of the party since 1924, and was previously represented by former Secretary of State for Defence Michael Fallon. At the 2019 general election, Trott was elected as MP for Sevenoaks with a majority of 20,818 and 60.7% of the vote. Trott is the first woman to represent the constituency.

She was a policy fellow at the Centre for Science and Policy at the University of Cambridge between 2020 and 2021.

On 5 February 2020 Trott presented her Private Member's Bill, which aimed to restrict access to botulinum toxin and filler cosmetic procedures for under 18s. It was supported by the British Association of Oral and Maxillofacial Surgeons. It became law in October 2021.

Trott was a member of the Health and Social Care Select Committee between March 2020 and November 2022. She was also on the steering committee of the China Research Group during the same period. Trott co-wrote a policy paper advocating for the establishment of "accelerator zones" with fellow Conservative MP Bim Afolami in February 2021 for the think tank Social Market Foundation. The zones would have relaxation of visa rules, tax incentives, and policy fellowship programmes.

On 6 July 2022, in the wake of the resignations of Chancellor Rishi Sunak and Health Secretary Sajid Javid from the second Johnson ministry following the Chris Pincher scandal, Trott resigned as Parliamentary Private Secretary to the Department for Transport, citing "trust in politics is – and must always be – of the utmost importance, but sadly in recent months this has been lost". Two days later, following Johnson's resignation as Conservative Party leader, she endorsed Sunak's failed bid to succeed him in the July–September 2022 Conservative Party leadership election, and also endorsed his successful bid to succeed Liz Truss in the October 2022 Conservative Party leadership election.

=== Ministerial career ===
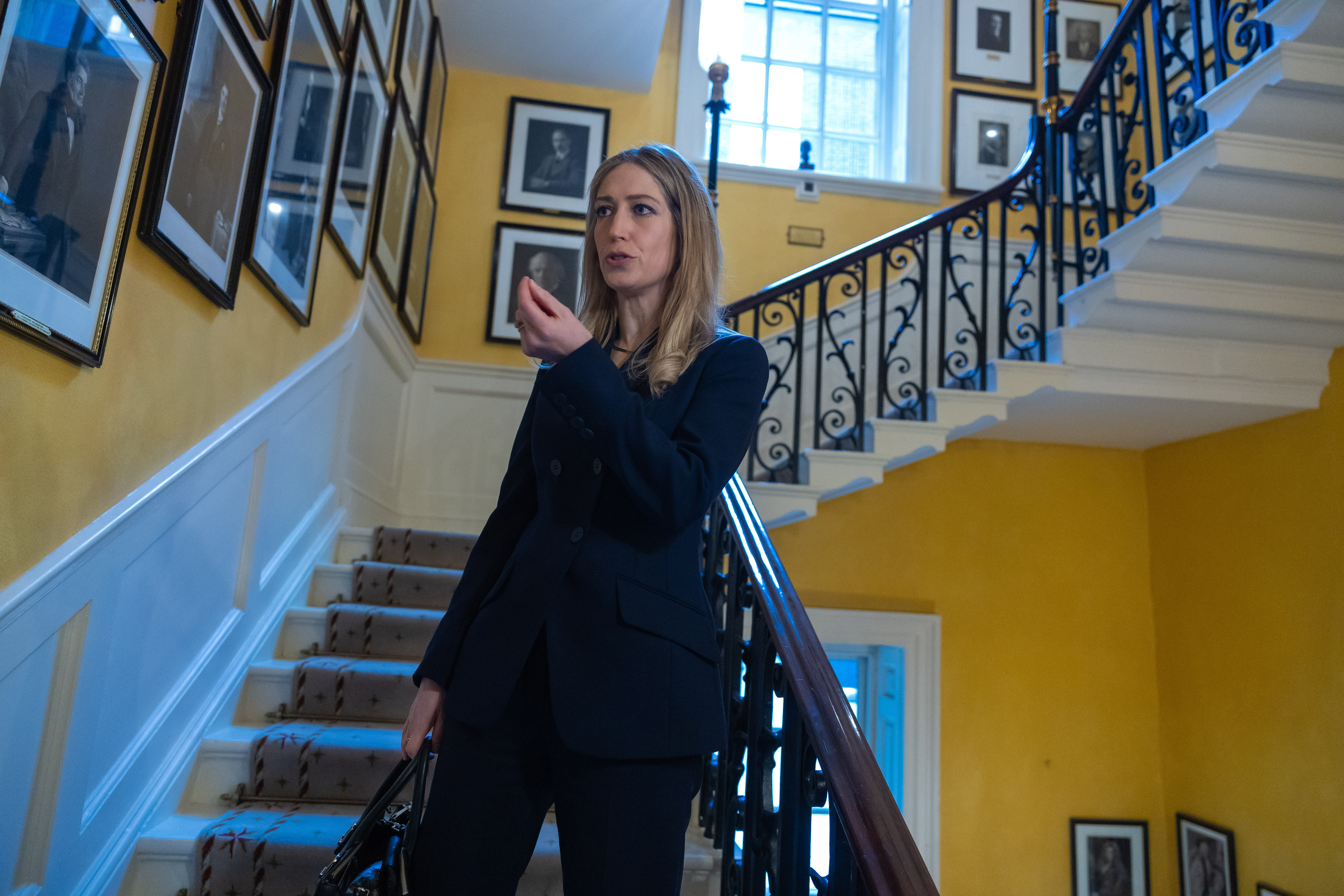
Trott in Downing Street, 2023

Trott was appointed Parliamentary Under-Secretary of State at the Department for Work and Pensions on 27 October 2022. During her tenure, the department published the first official data on the gender pensions gap. She also supported the Pensions (Extension of Automatic Enrolment) Act 2023 which enabled the government to reduce the minimum age of enrolment from 22 to 18.

On 13 November 2023, Trott was promoted to Chief Secretary to the Treasury during Sunak's second cabinet reshuffle.

She was sworn in as a member of the Privy Council on 13 December 2023 at Buckingham Palace following her appointment, entitling her to the honorific prefix "The Right Honourable" for life.

=== In opposition ===
At the 2024 general election, Trott was re-elected to Parliament as MP for Sevenoaks with a decreased vote share of 36.7% and a decreased majority of 5,440. Following the general election, Trott was appointed Shadow Chief Secretary to the Treasury in the Shadow Cabinet of Rishi Sunak. Trott endorsed the campaign of Kemi Badenoch in the 2024 Conservative Party leadership election.

== Personal life ==
Trott is married to Bahador "Bids" Mahvelati, the chief operating officer of wealth management company Evelyn Partners as of 2025 and a former partner at professional services firm PriceWaterhouseCoopers. They have one daughter and twin sons.

Parliament of the United Kingdom
Preceded by Sir Michael Fallon	Member of Parliament for Sevenoaks; 2019–present	Incumbent
Political offices
Preceded by John Glen	Chief Secretary to the Treasury; 2023–2024	Succeeded by Darren Jones
Preceded by Darren Jones	Shadow Chief Secretary to the Treasury; 2024	Succeeded by Richard Fuller
Preceded by Damian Hinds	Shadow Secretary of State for Education; 2024–present	Incumbent
