= 2021 Old Bexley and Sidcup by-election =

2021 UK parliament by-election

- 2 December 2021

Old Bexley and Sidcup constituency
- Turnout: 33.5% (▼36.3 pp)
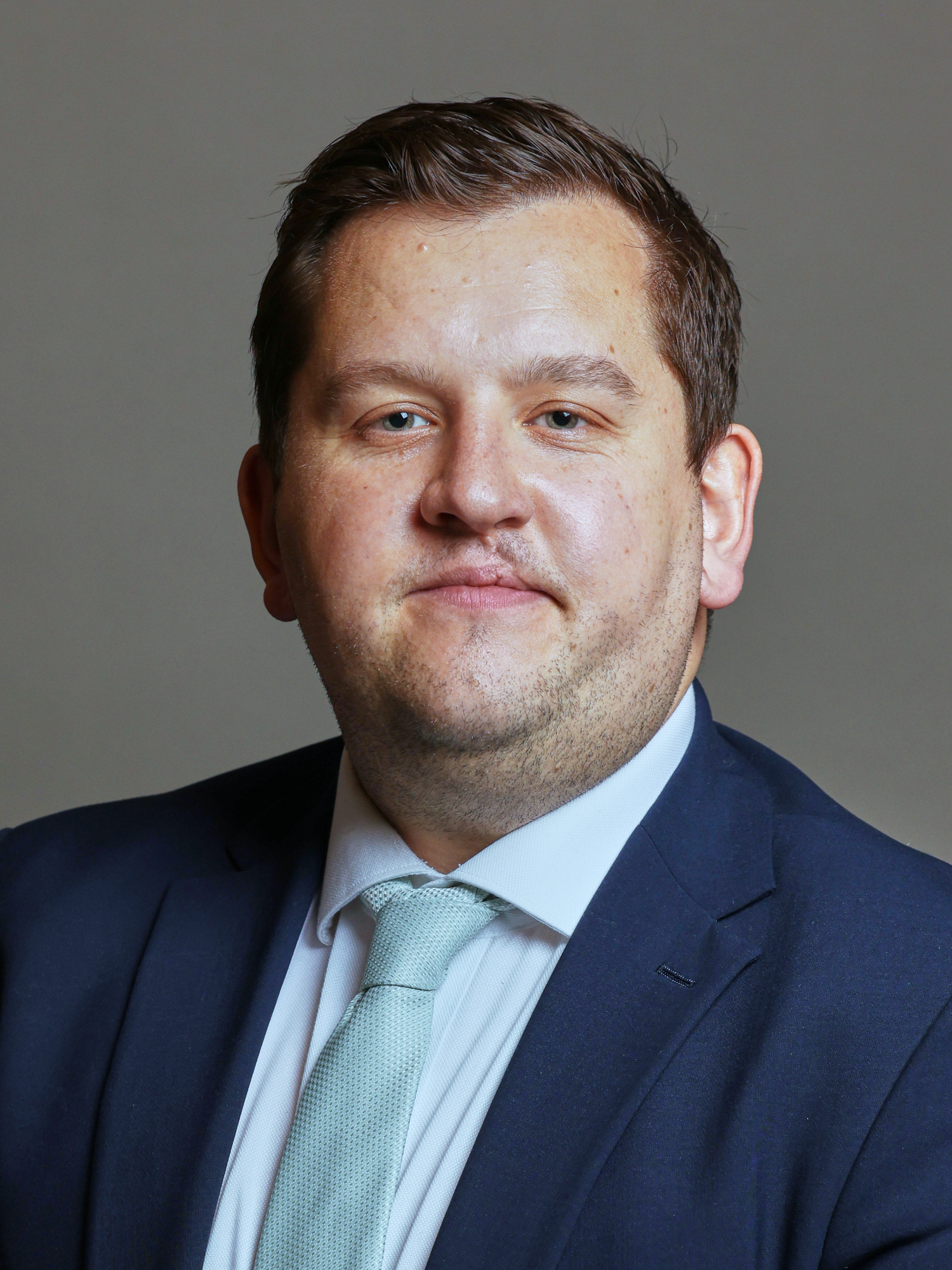

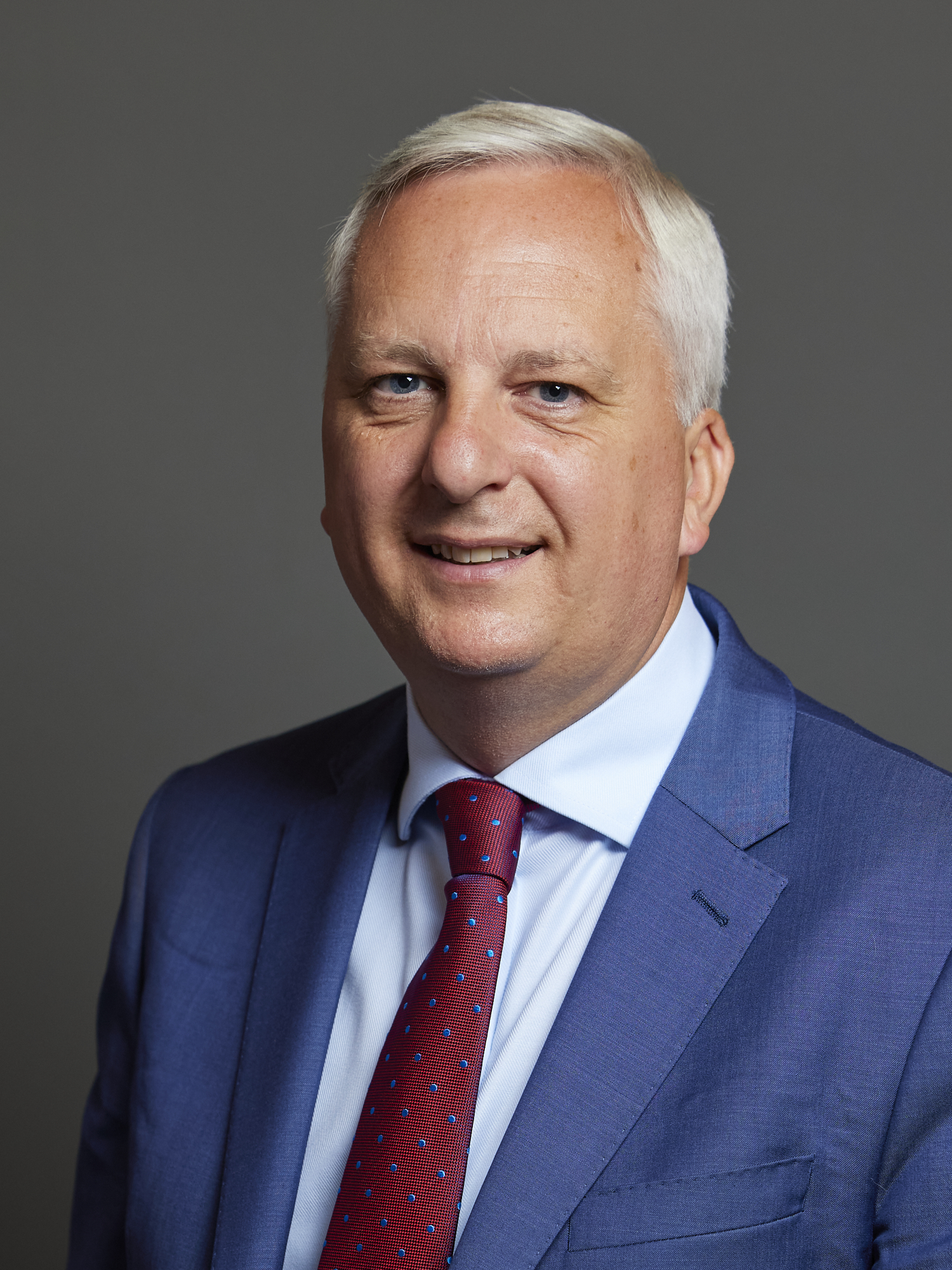

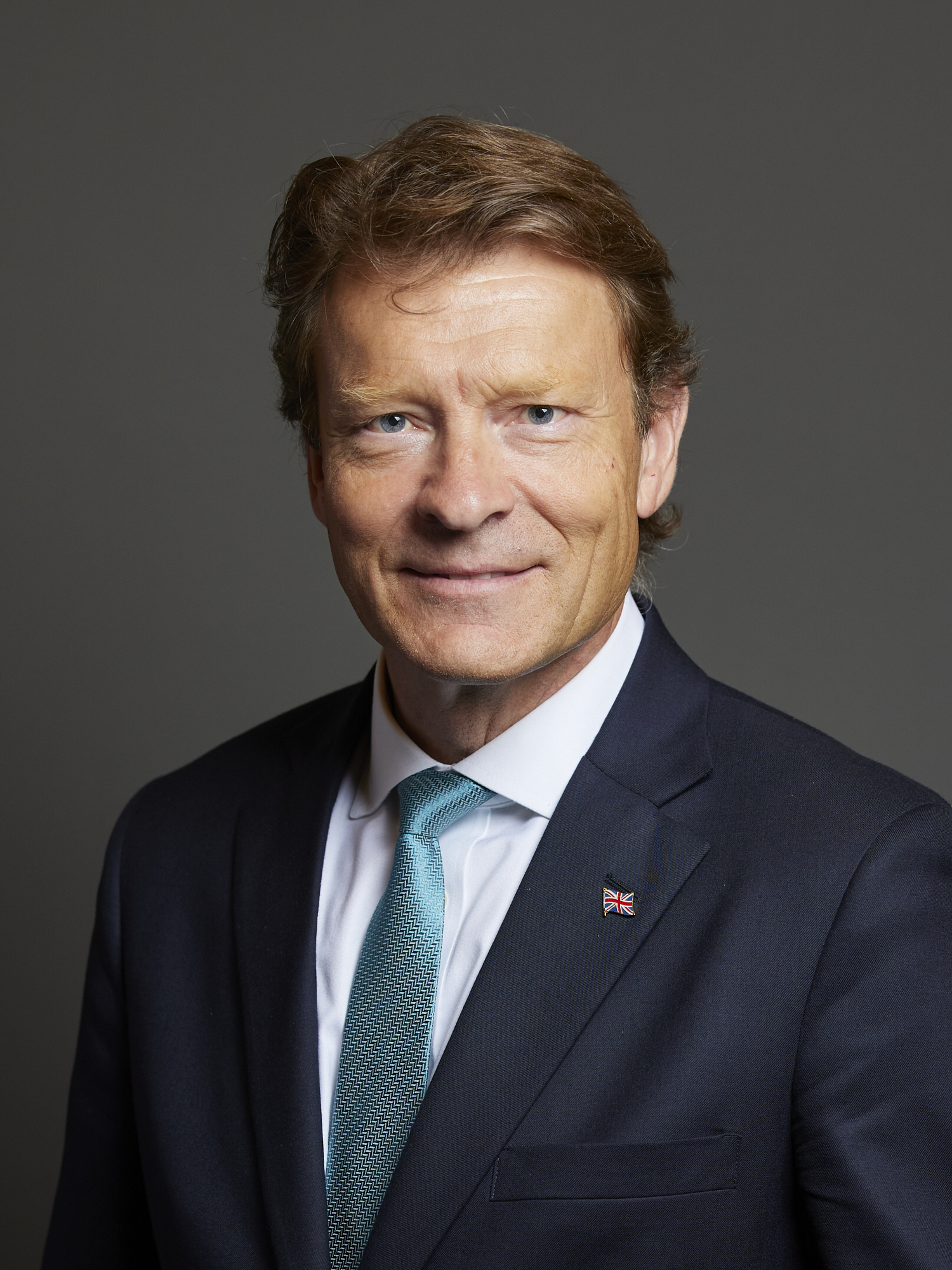
	First party	Second party	Third party
Candidate	Louie French	Daniel Francis	Richard Tice
Party	Conservative	Labour	Reform
Last election	64.5%	23.5%	New party
Popular vote	11,189	6,711	1,432
Percentage	51.5%	30.9%	6.6%
Swing	▼13.0 pp	▲7.4 pp	New
MP before election
James Brokenshire
Conservative
Elected MP
Louie French
Conservative

A by-election for the United Kingdom parliamentary constituency of Old Bexley and Sidcup was held on 2 December 2021, following the death of incumbent Conservative Party MP James Brokenshire. It was won by Louie French of the Conservatives, albeit with a reduced majority from 2019.

== Background ==
Old Bexley and Sidcup is a constituency in south-east London. The constituency includes the suburbs of East Wickham, Falconwood, Welling, Blackfen, Bexley and Sidcup. It voted to leave the European Union by 61 per cent to 39 per cent in the 2016 referendum.

The constituency was created in 1983 and has only elected Conservative Members of Parliament. For 18 years, former Prime Minister Edward Heath, who had represented predecessor constituencies since 1950, represented Old Bexley and Sidcup. He retired from Parliament in 2001. James Brokenshire was first elected in 2010. He had previously been the MP for Hornchurch from 2005 until it was abolished when the Fifth periodic review of Westminster constituencies took effect in 2010. In 2019, he was re-elected with a majority of nearly 19,000 votes, the largest majority he had ever achieved.

Brokenshire died from cancer on 7 October 2021, while serving. The writ of election was moved by Conservative Chief Whip Mark Spencer on 1 November.

On 3 November, polling day was confirmed for 2 December, with nominations closing on 9 November.

== Candidates ==
On 28 October 2021, Labour announced its candidate as Daniel Francis, a councillor for Belvedere, who was the Leader of the Labour Group on Bexley Council from 2017 to 2021. The other shortlisted Labour candidates were Marcus Storm, Luke Murphy, and Rachel Taggart-Ryan.

On 29 October, Reform UK announced that their leader Richard Tice would be their candidate.

On 30 October, Bexley councillor Louie French was chosen as the Conservative candidate. French had represented the Falconwood & Welling ward since 2014.

The Green Party selected Jonathan Rooks, a lecturer at South Bank University, who had previously contested the seat in 2010.

David Kurten, a Former Member of the London Assembly for UKIP, stood for the Heritage Party, which he founded and leads.

Care worker Simone Reynolds was selected as the candidate for the Liberal Democrats. Reynolds previously contested the seat in 2019.

Mad Mike Young, a former Minster Parish Councillor, was selected for the Official Monster Raving Loony Party.

When nominations closed on 9 November it was announced that there were 11 candidates.

== Result ==
Bar chart of the election result.

Changes to the vote share are relative to the result in the 2019 general election.

2021 Old Bexley and Sidcup by-election
Party	Candidate	Votes	%	±%
Conservative	Louie French	11,189	51.5	–13.0
Labour	Daniel Francis	6,711	30.9	+7.4
Reform	Richard Tice	1,432	6.6	New
Green	Jonathan Rooks	830	3.8	+0.6
Liberal Democrats	Simone Reynolds	647	3.0	–5.3
English Democrat	Elaine Cheeseman	271	1.3	New
UKIP	John Poynton	184	0.8	New
Rejoin EU	Richard Hewison	151	0.7	New
Heritage	David Kurten	116	0.5	New
CPA	Carol Valinejad	108	0.5	±0.0
Monster Raving Loony	Mad Mike Young	94	0.4	New
Majority		4,478	20.6	–20.4
Turnout		21,733	33.5	–36.3
Rejected ballots		50	0.2	
Total ballots		21,783	33.6	
Registered electors		64,831		
Conservative hold		Swing	–10.2	

== Previous result ==
General election 2019: Old Bexley and Sidcup
Party	Candidate	Votes	%	±%
Conservative	James Brokenshire	29,786	64.5	+3.1
Labour	Dave Tingle	10,834	23.5	–5.8
Liberal Democrats	Simone Reynolds	3,822	8.3	+5.0
Green	Matt Browne	1,477	3.2	+1.5
CPA	Carol Valinejad	226	0.5	+0.3
Majority		18,952	41.0	+8.8
Turnout		46,145	69.8	–3.0
Registered electors		66,104		
Conservative hold		Swing	+4.4	
