= James Brokenshire =

British politician (1968–2021)

The Right Honourable James Brokenshire
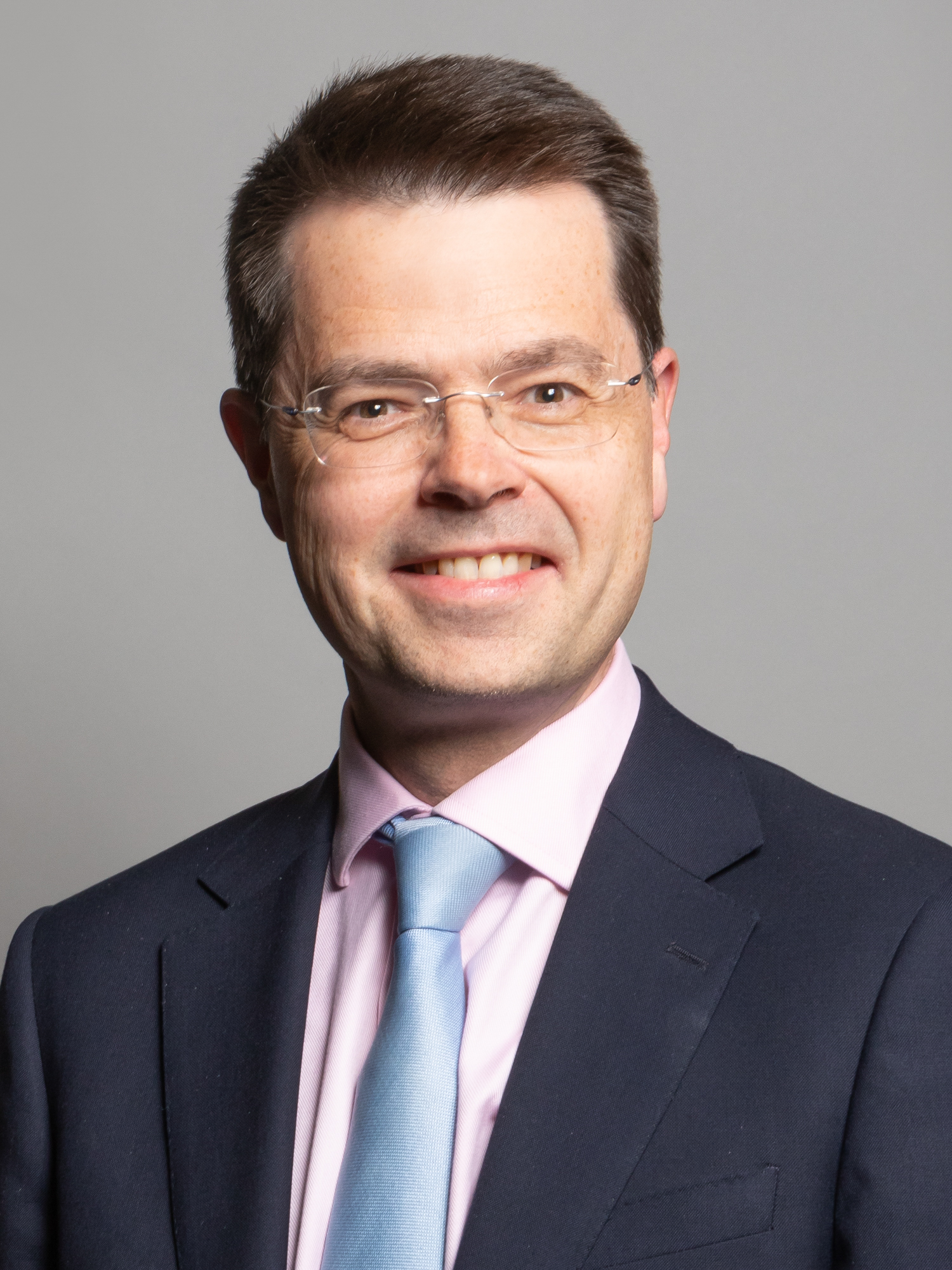
- Official portrait, 2020

Secretary of State for Housing, Communities and Local Government
- In office 30 April 2018 – 24 July 2019
- Prime Minister: Theresa May
- Preceded by: Sajid Javid
- Succeeded by: Robert Jenrick

Secretary of State for Northern Ireland
- In office 14 July 2016 – 8 January 2018
- Prime Minister: Theresa May
- Preceded by: Theresa Villiers
- Succeeded by: Karen Bradley
Junior ministerial offices
Minister of State for Security (Note: Parliamentary Under-Secretary for Crime and Security (2011–2014))
In office 13 February 2020 – 7 July 2021
| Prime Minister | Boris Johnson |
| Preceded by | Brandon Lewis |
| Succeeded by | Damian Hinds |
In office 11 May 2011 – 14 July 2016 Serving with John Hayes (2015–16)
| Prime Minister | David Cameron |
| Preceded by | The Baroness Neville-Jones |
| Succeeded by | Ben Wallace |
Minister of State for Immigration
In office 8 February 2014 – 14 July 2016
| Prime Minister | David Cameron |
| Preceded by | Mark Harper |
| Succeeded by | Robert Goodwill |
Parliamentary Under-Secretary of State for Crime Reduction
In office 11 May 2010 – 11 May 2011
| Prime Minister | David Cameron |
| Preceded by | Alan Campbell |
| Succeeded by | The Baroness Browning |
Parliamentary offices
Member of Parliament for Old Bexley and Sidcup
In office 6 May 2010 – 7 October 2021
| Preceded by | Derek Conway |
| Succeeded by | Louie French |
Member of Parliament for Hornchurch
In office 5 May 2005 – 6 May 2010
| Preceded by | John Cryer |
| Succeeded by | Constituency abolished |

Personal details
- Born: James Peter Brokenshire; 8 January 1968 Rochford, Essex, England
- Died: 7 October 2021 (aged 53) Dartford, Kent, England
- Party: Conservative
- Spouse: Cathrine Anne Mamelok (m. 1999)
- Children: 3
- Education: University of Exeter; London Guildhall University
- Website: Official website

James Peter Brokenshire (8 January 1968 – 7 October 2021) was a British politician. A member of the Conservative Party, he served in Theresa May's cabinet as Secretary of State for Northern Ireland from 2016 to 2018 and then as Secretary of State for Housing, Communities and Local Government from 2018 to 2019. He also served as a minister at the Home Office under David Cameron and Boris Johnson. Brokenshire was Member of Parliament (MP) for Hornchurch from 2005 to 2010, and for Old Bexley and Sidcup from 2010 until his death in 2021.

Born in Rochford, Essex, Brokenshire studied law at the University of Exeter before beginning work with a large international law firm. Deciding on a career in politics, he stood successfully as the Conservative candidate for the parliamentary constituency of Hornchurch in the 2005 general election. When his constituency was to be abolished in the boundary changes, he sought out another constituency to represent, failing to be selected in six until being selected for Old Bexley and Sidcup. He was elected MP for the seat in 2010.

In David Cameron's first government, Brokenshire was initially Parliamentary Under-Secretary for Crime Reduction; in May 2011, he was transferred to the position of Parliamentary Under-Secretary for Crime and Security. He oversaw the closure and privatisation of the Forensic Science Service and championed the Modern Slavery Bill. He served as Minister for Security and Immigration at the Home Office from 2014 to 2016. In July 2016, he was appointed Northern Ireland Secretary in Theresa May's new cabinet. He resigned in January 2018 on health grounds and was replaced by Karen Bradley. In April 2018, he was appointed Communities Secretary, following Sajid Javid's appointment as Home Secretary as a result of Amber Rudd's resignation. In 2020 he was appointed by Boris Johnson as Minister of State for Security at the Home Office. He stepped down from this post in July 2021 due to lung cancer and died in October of the same year.

== Early life and career ==
James Peter Brokenshire was born on 8 January 1968, at Rochford Hospital in Rochford, Essex. His father was a council chief executive.

He was educated at Davenant Foundation Grammar School in Loughton and then at the Cambridge Centre for Sixth-form Studies. After this he studied Law at the University of Exeter.

Brokenshire subsequently worked at the international law firm Jones Day as a solicitor. In this position, he advised on company law, mergers and acquisitions, and corporate finance transactions. (Note: His Who's Who entry says "Solicitor with Jones Day Gouldens, 1991–2005".)

== Political career ==
=== MP for Hornchurch ===
Brokenshire was elected at the 2005 general election to the parliamentary constituency of Hornchurch, defeating the Labour candidate and incumbent member John Cryer by 480 votes. The election itself resulted in a third successive term for Prime Minister Tony Blair and the Labour government. From 2005 to 2006, Brokenshire was a member of the House of Commons Constitutional Affairs Select Committee. From 2006 to 2010, he then served as the Shadow Minister for Crime Reduction.

Brokenshire knew that his constituency, Hornchurch, would be dissolved for the next election, with the majority merging with the safe Labour seat of Dagenham to form the new seat of Dagenham and Rainham (notionaly Labour held by 14.9%). In November 2006, he applied for selection as the Conservative parliamentary candidate for Witham in Essex, but was defeated by Priti Patel. He simultaneously campaigned to be selected as Conservative candidate for the constituency of Hornchurch and Upminster, which contained part of his existing seat, but in March 2007 was defeated there by Angela Watkinson, the sitting member for the predecessor seat of Upminster.

He next applied for Gillingham and Rainham in July 2007, Grantham and Stamford in October 2007, North East Cambridgeshire in January 2008, and Maidstone and The Weald later that same month. He was unsuccessful in all of these attempts.

=== MP for Old Bexley and Sidcup ===
Old Bexley and Sidcup in Greater London

Derek Conway, the member for the Conservative safe seat of Old Bexley and Sidcup in southeast London, was embroiled in an expenses scandal and resigned, after which Brokenshire put his name forward as a potential replacement. His competitors for the seat were Rebecca Harris, Katie Lindsay, and Julia Manning, and he was successful in gaining the selection for the seat in June 2008. He was described as a "serial carpetbagger" by a local single issue party, Independents to Save Queen Mary's Hospital.

In the 2010 general election, Brokenshire was elected for Old Bexley and Sidcup with 24,625 votes (53.93%), beating the Labour candidate Rick Everitt, in second place with 8,768 votes (19.21%). Voter turnout was 69.13%. Upon victory, Brokenshire announced that his priority would be to prevent the proposed closure of accident and emergency services at local Queen Mary's Hospital, Sidcup.

=== Parliamentary Under Secretary for Crime Reduction ===
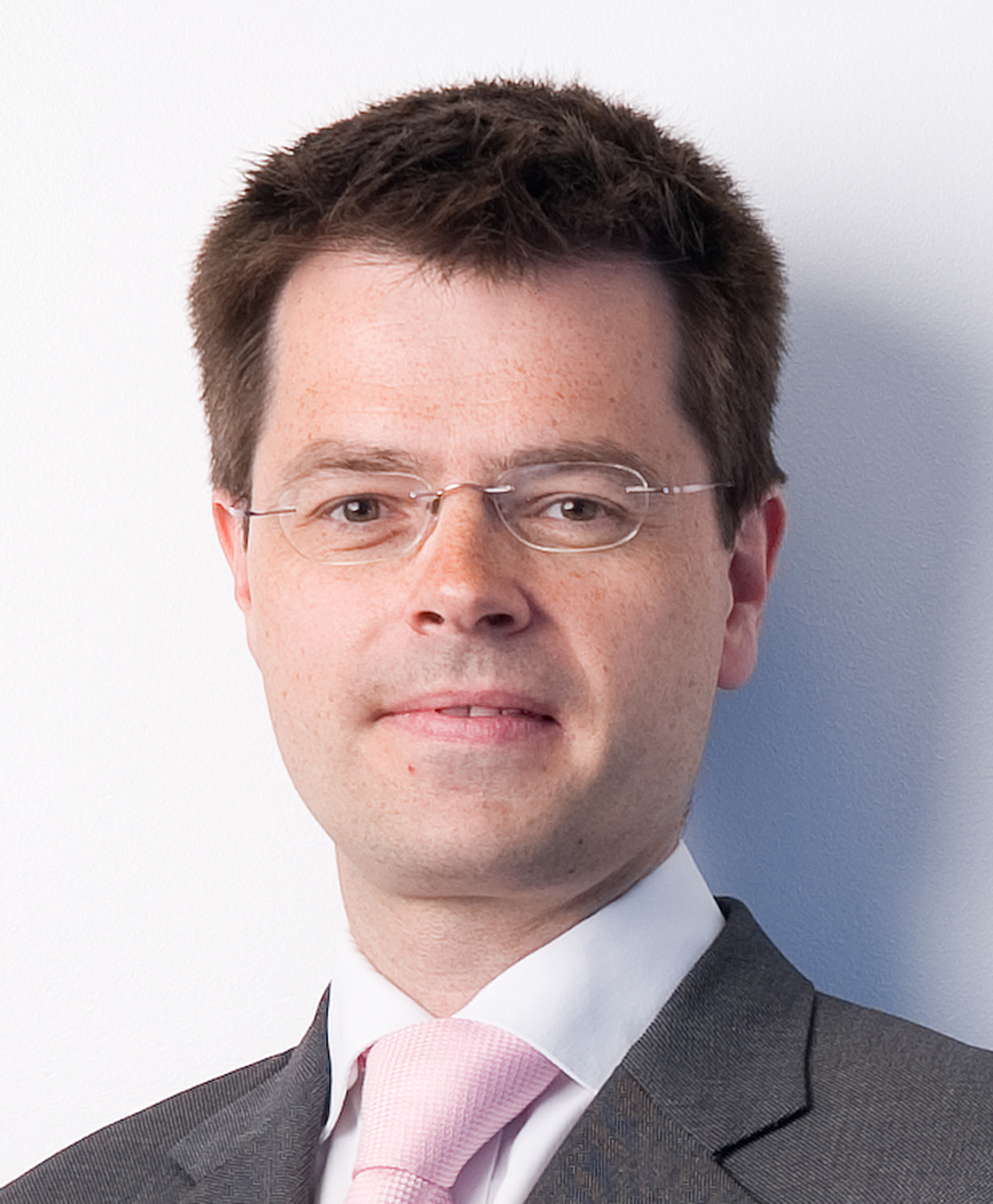
Official portrait, 2010

With no party gaining an overall majority in the House of Commons, the 2010 election resulted in the formation of a coalition government consisting of the Conservative and Liberal Democrat parties, led by Conservative prime minister David Cameron. The new prime minister appointed Brokenshire as Parliamentary Under-Secretary of State for Crime Reduction in the Home Office. One of his first moves was to initiate the closing of the UK's Forensic Science Service; it had been making operational losses of £2 million a month and was predicted to go into administration in early 2011. Brokenshire stated his desire that there would be "no continuing state interest in a forensics provider by March 2012", with the service's role being taken on by private enterprise. Critics asserted that this move would result in the loss of hundreds of jobs and the degradation of forensic research and criminal justice, with an MPs enquiry chaired by Labour MP Andrew Miller criticising how the closure had been overseen.

In August 2010, Brokenshire called for the government to adopt a new approach to the "war on drugs" in Britain; he argued that they should focus on getting addicts off drugs rather than minimising the effects of drug use as the preceding Labour government had focused on.

=== Parliamentary Under Secretary for Crime and Security ===
In May 2011, Brokenshire's Home Office brief was changed from Crime Reduction to Parliamentary Under-Secretary of State for Crime and Security following the resignation of Baroness Neville-Jones. However, he was not appointed to the more senior rank of Minister of State. In this position, he was responsible for updating plans to tackle terror content online. This move was seen as controversial by broadband companies and freedom of speech groups.

In the buildup to the 2012 Summer Olympics in London, he stated his belief that the games would be a "great success", largely due to the government's security measures. He also commented that "I think it will bring Bexley together and the torch relay will be a fantastic event for the community ... I'm quite sure it will have a lasting impression."

In October 2013, Brokenshire published a draft of a proposed Modern Slavery Bill, designed to tackle slavery in the UK. He said the bill will "send the strongest possible message to criminals that if you are involved in this disgusting trade in human beings, you will be arrested, you will be prosecuted and you will be locked up." Experts in the issue were sceptical of the bill, believing that it had many shortcomings and was mainly designed to enhance Theresa May's career. The bill was subsequently enacted as the Modern Slavery Act 2015.

In January 2014, Brokenshire called on National Rail to improve its services after statistics were published revealing that rail services across Bexley Borough had worsened throughout 2013.

=== Minister of State for Security and Immigration (1st term) ===
Brokenshire assumed the enlarged role of Minister for Security and Immigration on 8 February 2014 following the resignation of Mark Harper.

=== Northern Ireland Secretary ===
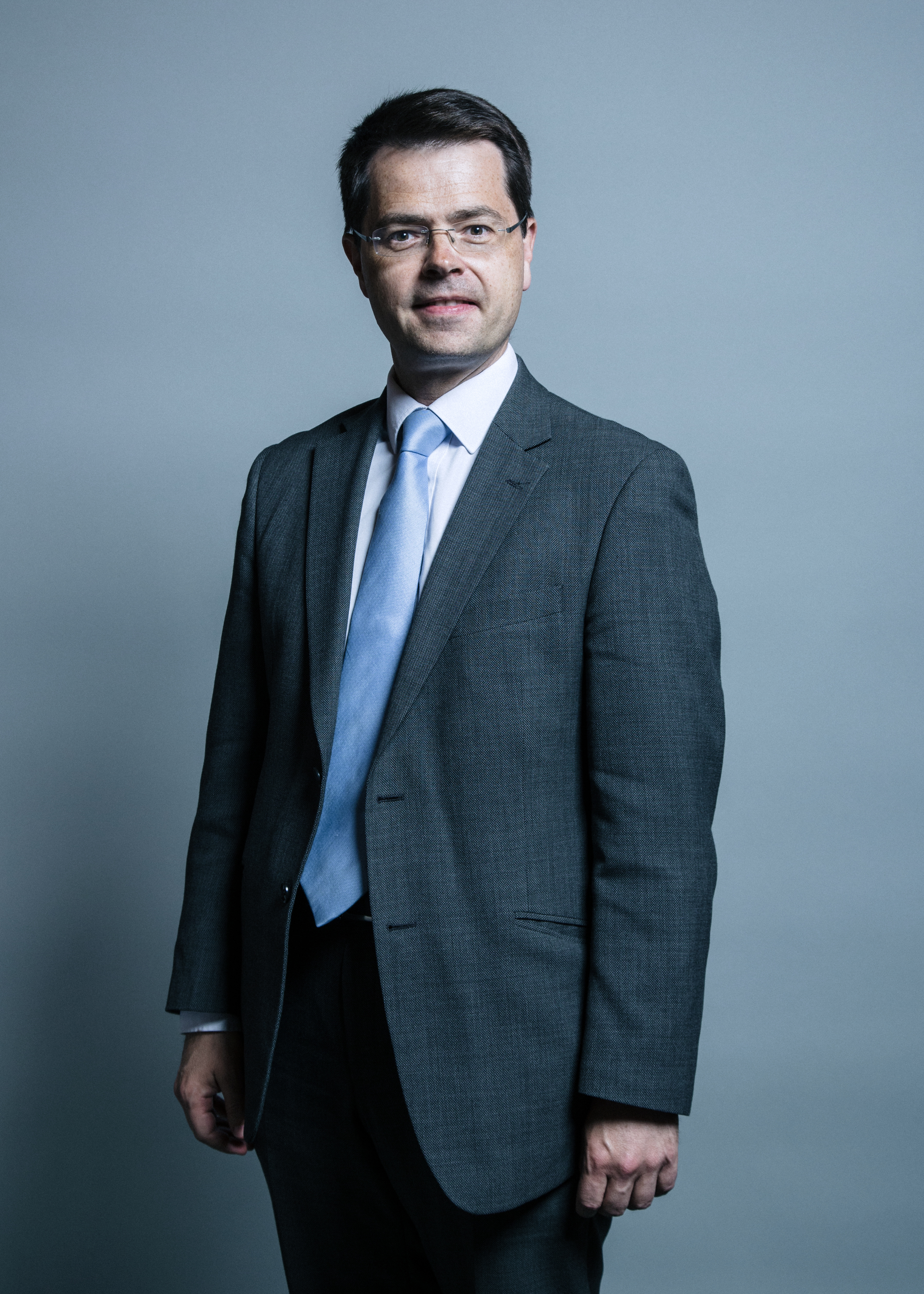
Parliamentary portrait by Chris McAndrew, 2017

In July 2016, under Theresa May's new cabinet, Brokenshire was appointed the Northern Ireland Secretary. On 16 January 2017, the Northern Ireland Executive collapsed following the resignation of Martin McGuinness as deputy First Minister one week earlier in protest of the DUP's handling of the Renewable Heat Incentive scandal. Brokenshire, as Northern Ireland Secretary, temporarily assumed the powers of the Executive and called for snap elections for the Northern Ireland Assembly, which took place on 2 March 2017.

Brokenshire's comments in The Sunday Telegraph of 28 January 2017 sparked consternation in Northern Ireland:

Writing in the Telegraph, James Brokenshire, the Northern Ireland Secretary, concedes there is an apparent "imbalance" that has led to a "disproportionate" focus on criminal inquiries involving former soldiers. "I am clear the current system is not working and we are in danger of seeing the past rewritten."

Following a question from MP Sylvia Hermon, Brokenshire offered his "clear and unequivocal" support for the Lord Chief Justice of Northern Ireland, Declan Morgan. Morgan had earlier criticised Brokenshire for refusing funding for cases and thereby adding to case backlogs when Brokenshire refused to grant £10 million to pay for an inquest into the deaths of eleven civilians shot dead by British forces in 1971 in the Ballymurphy massacre.

Brian Feeney in The Irish News accused Brokenshire of "ineptitude ... [though] no one would give him the credit of even being aware of the coincidence of the date he chose, when British soldiers killed most innocent victims in Ireland." (Bloody Sunday), while the Belfast Telegraph editorial accused the minister of "playing a dangerous game".

Brokenshire resigned as Northern Ireland Secretary on 8 January 2018 on health grounds due to an upcoming lung operation. On 20 January 2018, it was announced that he had the operation and had been discharged from hospital.

In September 2019, Brokenshire said that his best advice to people becoming Northern Ireland Secretary was to "get yourself a history book and read it."

=== Housing, Communities and Local Government Secretary ===
In April 2018, Brokenshire was appointed Secretary of State for Housing, Communities and Local Government following Sajid Javid's appointment as Home Secretary in the light of Amber Rudd's resignation after the Windrush scandal. After his appointment, Brokenshire said he was "looking forward to taking the Government's agenda forward especially on building the homes our country needs". In this role, Brokenshire was responsible for regional growth, local government, housing, planning, rough sleeping, building safety and communities. Hours after taking on the new role, Brokenshire appeared in Parliament and stated, after a question from Andrew Gwynne (Labour's shadow communities secretary), that "local government is in my blood".

He piloted the Tenant Fees Act (2019) through Parliament, which, among other regulations, caps the deposit a landlord or a letting agency may take from a new tenant and largely abolishes administration fees.

In April 2019, Brokenshire sacked philosopher Roger Scruton from his unpaid role as chair of the British government's "Building Better, Building Beautiful" commission. The dismissal followed the publication of an interview with Scruton by George Eaton in the New Statesman magazine, in which Eaton had suggested that Scruton had made unsavoury remarks. A series of online comments from Eaton suggested that he had set out to present Scruton, a former contributor to the New Statesman, in a poor light. Following a campaign from Douglas Murray of The Spectator, the tapes of the interview were eventually leaked, which prompted the New Statesman to publish a correction of its original article and an apology. Brokenshire apologised to Scruton for his sacking and invited him to rejoin the commission.

=== Minister of State for Security (2nd term) ===
In 2020, Brokenshire returned to government as the Minister for Security. On 11 January 2021, he announced that he would take a leave of absence to prepare for a cancer operation.

On 7 July 2021, Brokenshire tendered his resignation to Prime Minister Boris Johnson, stating his recovery from lung cancer was "taking longer than expected".

== Political views ==
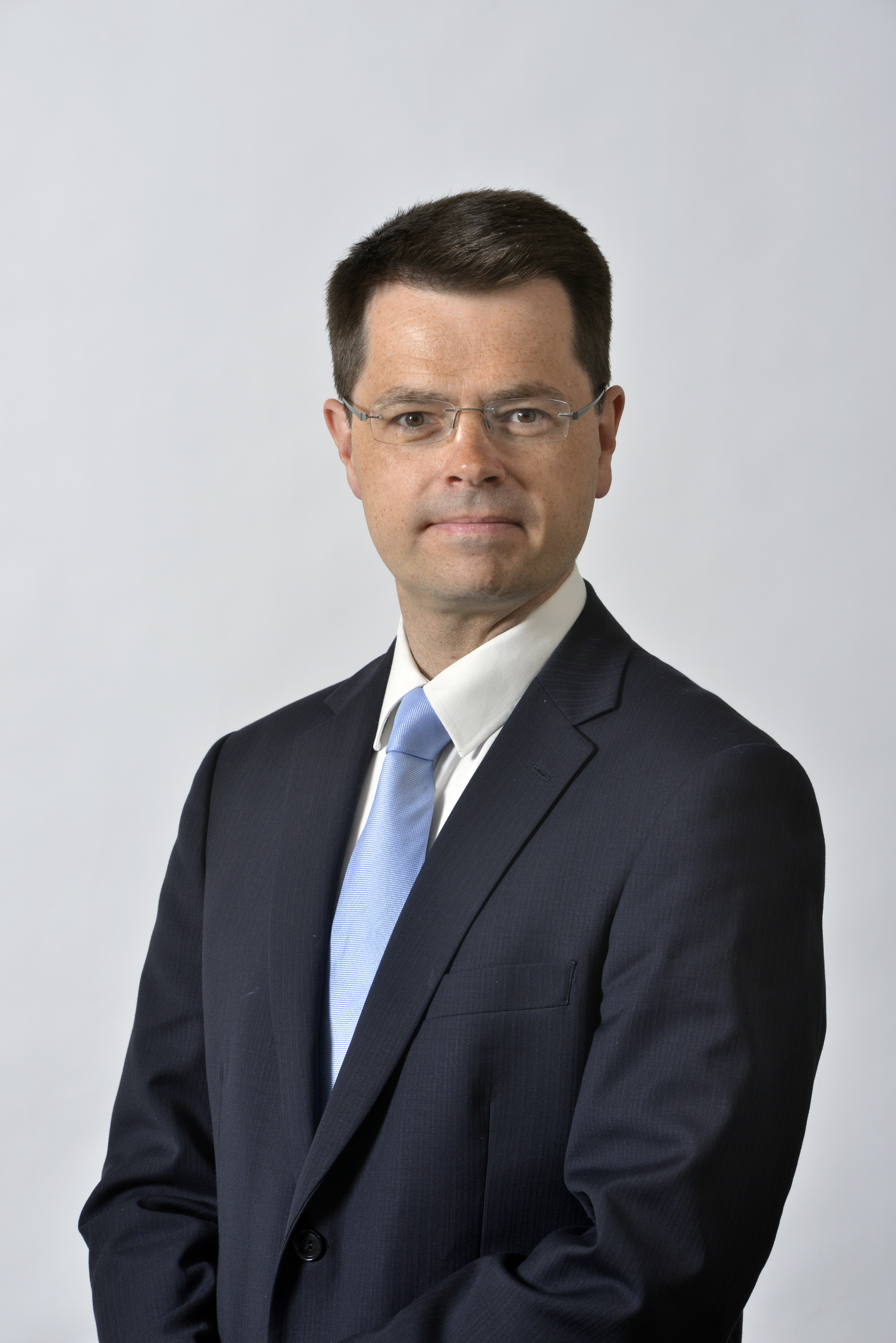
Official portrait, 2015

On Brexit, Brokenshire was believed to have voted to remain in the EU in the 2016 referendum, but by April 2019, his position on the "soft Brexit v no deal" debate was described by reporters in The Guardian as unclear.

== Personal life ==
Brokenshire married Cathrine Anne Mamelok in 1999. (Note: Marriage – information from Who's Who.) They had two daughters and a son, and lived in Bexley.

He had expressed support for the charity Cancer Research UK and in March 2013 publicly backed their Cell Slider website, calling on all of his constituents to get involved in the initiative.

=== Illness and death ===
In December 2017, Brokenshire noted blood in his cough, and testing disclosed early-stage lung cancer. The following month, he had the upper lobe of his right lung removed at Guy's Hospital and returned to Parliament five weeks later. Brokenshire said he wanted to end the social stigma around lung cancer because he, like 15% of people with the disease, had never smoked.

In January 2021, he took a leave of absence from his ministerial post in preparation for a pneumonectomy. On 3 October 2021, Brokenshire was admitted to Darent Valley Hospital in Kent because of a further deterioration in his condition; he died there on 7 October, aged 53.

Many political figures, including Prime Minister Boris Johnson and Leader of the Opposition Keir Starmer, memorialised him. The House of Commons held tributes to him on 20 October; his funeral took place the next day at St John the Evangelist Church in Bexley. Robert Buckland, Cressida Dick, Bob Neill, Priti Patel and Rishi Sunak were named as some of those in attendance. Former prime minister Theresa May gave a Bible reading.

== Honours ==
He was sworn in as a member of Her Majesty's Most Honourable Privy Council on 8 October 2015 at Buckingham Palace. This gave him the honorific title "The Right Honourable" for life.

== Notes ==
Parliament of the United Kingdom
| Preceded by John Cryer | Member of Parliament for Hornchurch; 2005–2010 | Constituency abolished |
| Preceded by Derek Conway | Member of Parliament for Old Bexley and Sidcup; 2010–2021 | Succeeded by Louie French |
Political offices
| Preceded by Theresa Villiers | Secretary of State for Northern Ireland; 2016–2018 | Succeeded by Karen Bradley |
| Preceded by Sajid Javid | Secretary of State for Housing, Communities and Local Government; 2018–2019 | Succeeded by Robert Jenrick |
| Preceded by Brandon Lewis | Minister of State for Security; 2019–2021 | Succeeded by Damian Hinds |
