= Pauline Neville-Jones, Baroness Neville-Jones =

British baroness

The Right Honourable The Baroness Neville-Jones DCMG PC
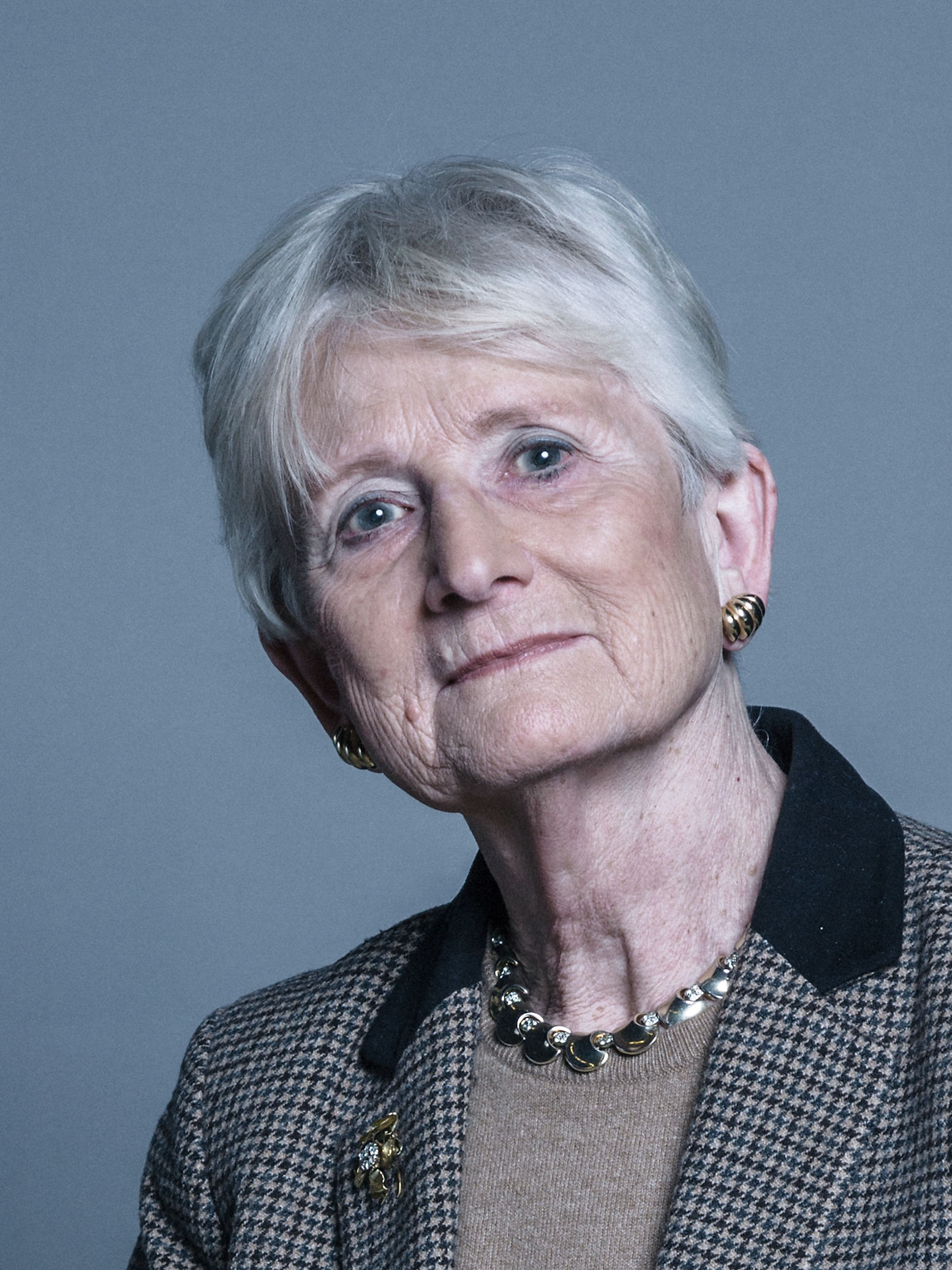
- Official portrait, 2018

Minister of State for Security and Counter Terrorism
- In office 12 May 2010 – 9 May 2011
- Prime Minister: David Cameron
- Preceded by: The Lord West of Spithead
- Succeeded by: James Brokenshire

Member of the House of Lords
- Lord Temporal
- Life peerage 15 October 2007

Personal details
- Born: Lilian Pauline Neville-Jones; 2 November 1939 (age 86) Birmingham
- Party: Conservative
- Education: Lady Margaret Hall, Oxford

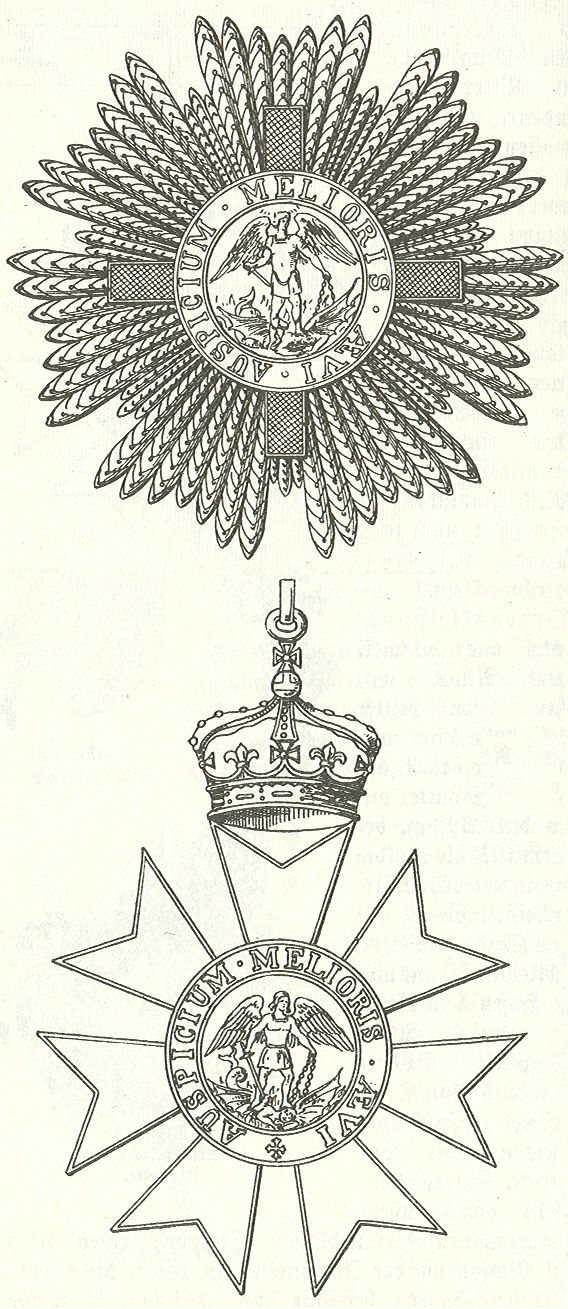
DCMG insignia

Lilian Pauline Neville-Jones, Baroness Neville-Jones DCMG PC (born 2 November 1939) is a British politician and former civil servant who served as Chairman of the Joint Intelligence Committee (JIC) from 1993 to 1994. A member of the Conservative Party, she served on the National Security Council and was Minister of State for Security and Counter Terrorism at the Home Office from 2010 to 2011.

On 12 May 2010, Prime Minister David Cameron appointed her as Minister of State for Security and Counter Terrorism in the Home Office with a permanent position on the newly created National Security Council.

On 9 May 2011, the BBC reported that Neville-Jones had left her role as Security Minister at "her own request"; her security brief was taken over by James Brokenshire. She was then immediately appointed as "Special Representative to Business on Cyber Security".

== Education ==
Lady Neville-Jones was educated at Leeds Girls' High School and Lady Margaret Hall, Oxford (Modern History).

== Career ==
=== Civil Service ===
Neville-Jones was a career member of Her Majesty's Diplomatic Service from 1963 to 1996, during which time she served in British Missions in Rhodesia, Singapore, Washington, DC and Bonn. Between 1977 and 1982 she was seconded to the European Commission where she worked as Deputy and then Chef de Cabinet to Commissioner Christopher Tugendhat.

From 1991 to 1994 she was Head of the Defence and Overseas Secretariat in the Cabinet Office and Deputy Secretary to the Cabinet. During 1993 and 1994 she was Chairman of the Joint Intelligence Committee. From 1994, until her retirement, she was Political Director in the Foreign and Commonwealth Office, in which capacity she led the British delegation to the Dayton negotiations on the Bosnia peace settlement. In 2003 the Bosnian leader Alija Izetbegović commented that during these negotiations she "never tried to conceal her dislike for us".

Before she left the civil service, Neville-Jones was openly critical of the Foreign Office for passing her over for the post of ambassador to France.

=== Business dealings with Milosevic ===
In 1996, shortly after resigning from the Foreign Office, Neville-Jones and her former boss Douglas Hurd were hired by NatWest Markets, a British bank, to travel to Belgrade and negotiate a privatisation deal with Slobodan Milosevic for Serbia's state telecoms industry.

The money from the deal revitalised Milosevic's dictatorship and may have helped fund his later war in Kosovo. Neville-Jones and Hurd were extensively criticised for their decision to take part in the deal.

=== BBC ===
She was appointed a BBC governor in January 1998. Her final post was as chairman of the Governors' World Service Consultative Group. Neville-Jones was chairman of the Audit Committee from 1998 until standing down from that position in September 2004 and left the BBC on 31 December 2004.

=== Defence ===
From 2002 to 2005, Neville-Jones was non-executive chairman of the part Government-owned defence technology company QinetiQ, which was privatised for £1.3 billion in February 2006. She was chairman of the Information Assurance Advisory Council until 2007.

=== Politics ===
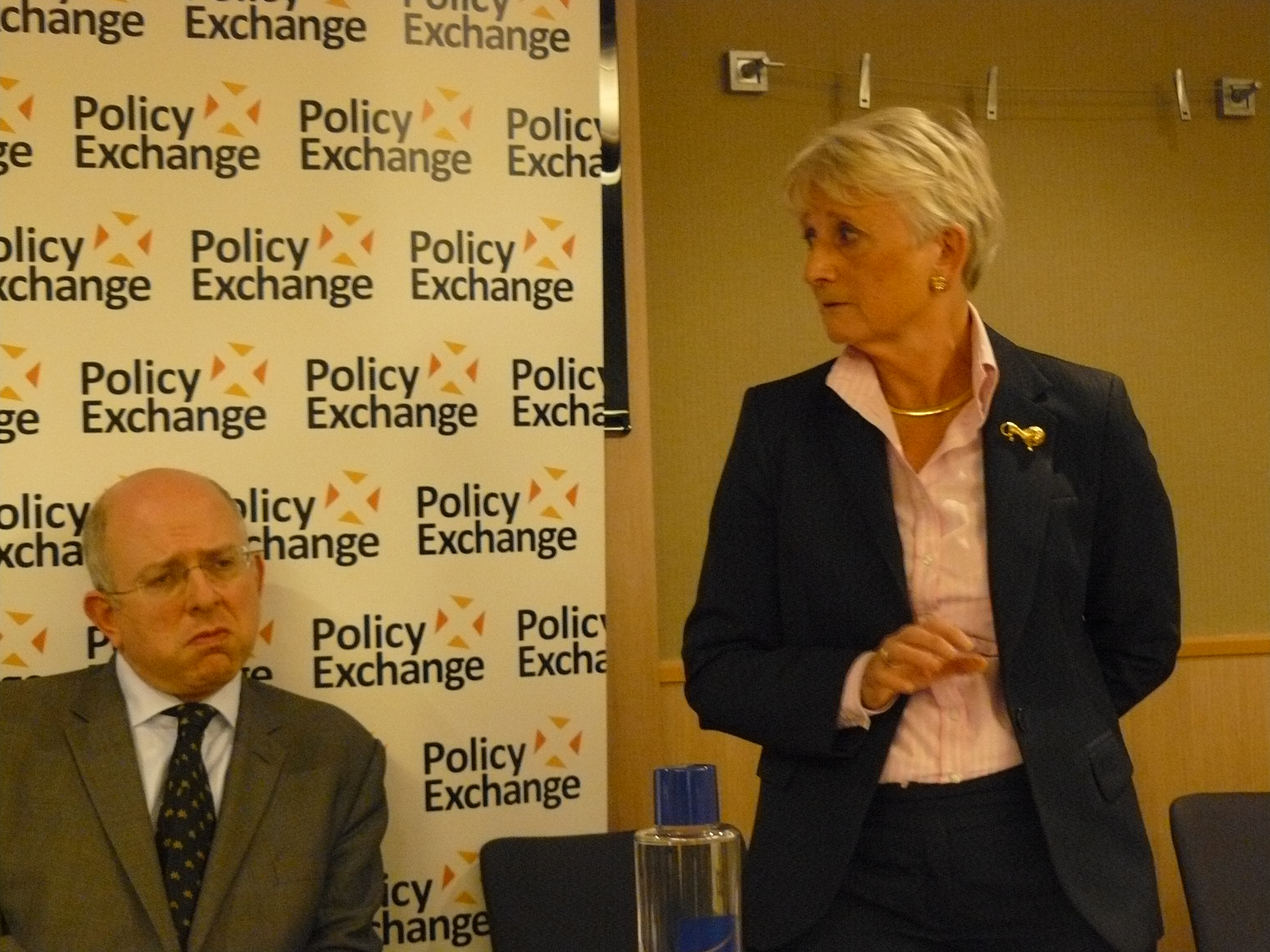
Baroness Neville-Jones (right) at Conservative Party conference, 2011

In January 2006 she joined one of the Conservative Party's new 'policy groups' on national security.

On 2 July 2007 her appointment as a working peer and Shadow Security Minister was announced. Her title was gazetted as Baroness Neville-Jones, of Hutton Roof in the County of Cumbria on 15 October 2007.

On 9 January 2009, Lady Neville-Jones warned that Israel's ongoing war in the Gaza Strip would encourage revolutionary Islamism in Arab countries and Islamic terrorism beyond, and called for a revival of the Middle East peace process.

On 13 May 2010, she was appointed Minister of State for Security and Counter Terrorism in David Cameron's Conservative–Liberal Democrat coalition government, and was also sworn of the Privy Council.

On 31 March 2011 she told The Daily Telegraph that Britain's Muslim population needs to be persuaded by the Government that Britain is a single nation, and that they can't just "rub along together" but must be persuaded that their long-term future lies in Britain. Neville-Jones later spoke out against "internet hate preaching and jihadist rhetoric", arguing that the murder of Lee Rigby was likely to have been inspired by such material.

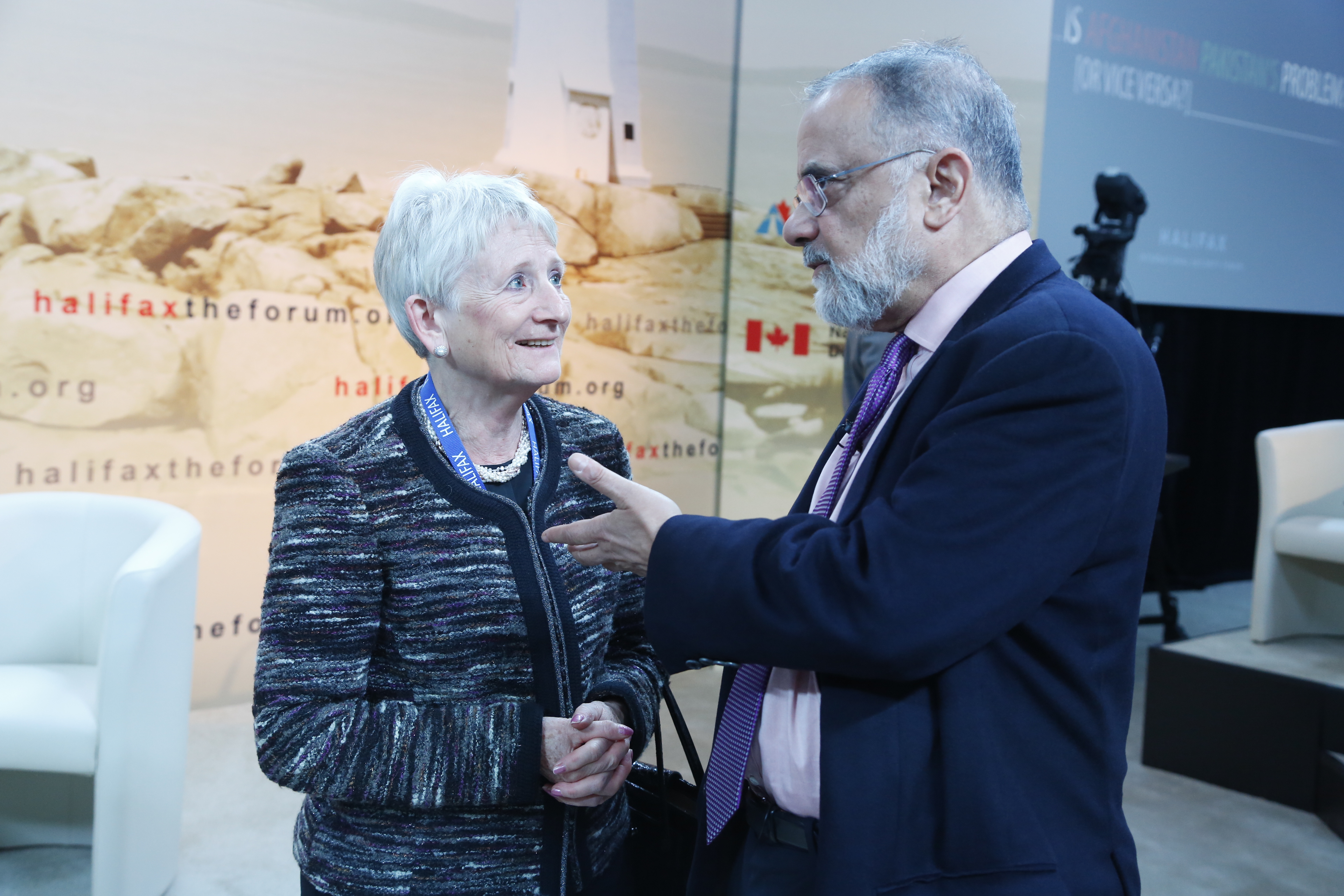
Neville-Jones and Ahmed Rashid at the Halifax International Security Forum 2012

On 9 May 2011, Neville-Jones left her post as Minister of State for Security and Counter-Terrorism in the Home Office at her own request.

In November 2014, Neville-Jones presented a speech at the Halifax International Security Forum, which she prefaced with an op-ed in a Toronto newspaper. She wrote about the quantum technology revolution and related that the "policy failure" of the 2003 Iraq War was due to "outdated intelligence, lack of ability to test agent information against other sources and misinterpretation of apparent battlefield evidence".

== Positions ==
Neville-Jones is an honorary fellow of Lady Margaret Hall, Oxford, and an honorary doctor of the University of London and the Open University. In August 2013, the Council on CyberSecurity announced that she had joined the organization's Advisory Board. She is also an Advisory Board member at the Council on Geostrategy.

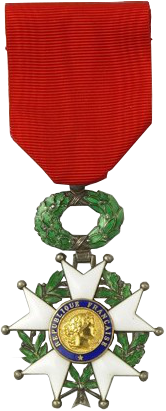
Légion d'honneur

== Awards and honours ==
Appointed a Companion of the Order of St Michael and St George (CMG) in the 1987 Birthday Honours, she was raised to Dame Commander (DCMG) in the 1995 New Year's Honours. Neville-Jones also received the Légion d'honneur (Chevalier) in 2009. She was recognized as one of the BBC's 100 women of 2013.

On 25 July 2025, Neville-Jones was awarded an honorary Doctor of Laws (LL.D.) from Lancaster University.

== Styles ==
- Pauline Neville-Jones (1939–1987)
- Pauline Neville-Jones, CMG (1987–1995)
- Dame Pauline Neville-Jones, DCMG (1995–2007)
- The Right Honourable The Baroness Neville-Jones, DCMG (2007–2010)
- The Right Honourable The Baroness Neville-Jones, DCMG PC (2010–present)

Orders of precedence in the United Kingdom
Preceded by The Baroness Warsi	Ladies; Baroness Neville-Jones	Followed by The Baroness Garden of Frognal
