= Damian Hinds =

British politician (born 1969)

The Right Honourable Damian Hinds MP
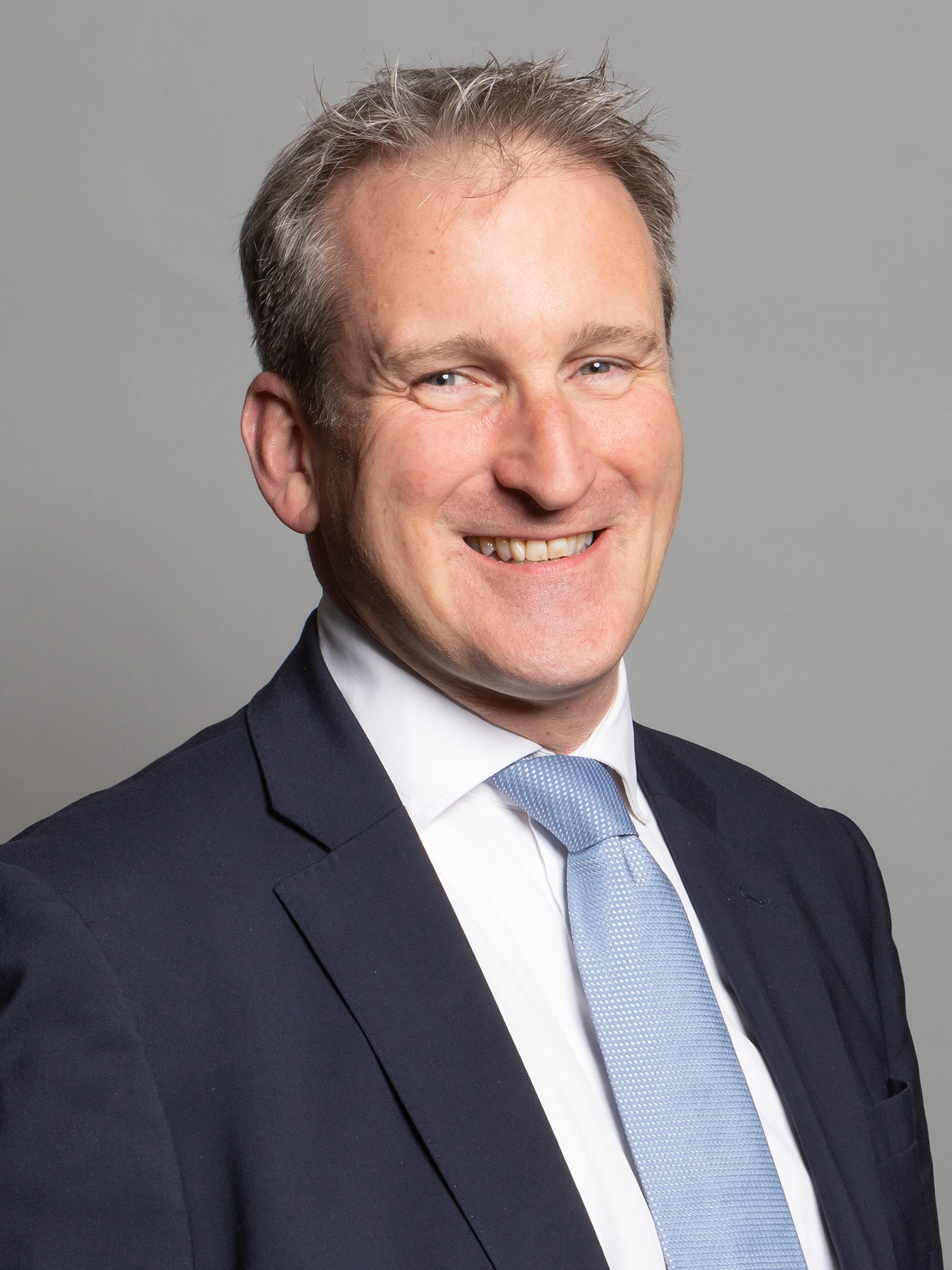
- Official portrait, 2020

Shadow Secretary of State for Health and Social Care
- Incumbent
- Assumed office 31 August 2026
- Leader: Kemi Badenoch
- Preceded by: Stuart Andrew

Shadow Secretary of State for Education
- In office 8 July 2024 – 4 November 2024
- Leader: Rishi Sunak
- Preceded by: Bridget Phillipson
- Succeeded by: Laura Trott

Minister of State for Schools
- In office 13 November 2023 – 5 July 2024
- Prime Minister: Rishi Sunak
- Preceded by: Nick Gibb
- Succeeded by: Catherine McKinnell

Minister of State for Prisons, Parole and Probation
- In office 27 October 2022 – 13 November 2023
- Prime Minister: Rishi Sunak
- Preceded by: Robert Butler
- Succeeded by: Edward Argar

Minister of State for Security and Borders (Note: Minister of State for Security until September 2021.)
- In office 13 August 2021 – 7 July 2022
- Prime Minister: Boris Johnson
- Preceded by: James Brokenshire
- Succeeded by: Stephen McPartland

Secretary of State for Education
- In office 8 January 2018 – 24 July 2019
- Prime Minister: Theresa May
- Preceded by: Justine Greening
- Succeeded by: Gavin Williamson

Minister of State for Employment
- In office 17 July 2016 – 8 January 2018
- Prime Minister: Theresa May
- Preceded by: Priti Patel
- Succeeded by: Alok Sharma

Exchequer Secretary to the Treasury
- In office 12 May 2015 – 13 July 2016
- Prime Minister: David Cameron
- Preceded by: Priti Patel
- Succeeded by: Andrew Jones (Note: Office not in use between July 2016 and June 2017.)

Member of Parliament; for East Hampshire
- Incumbent
- Assumed office 6 May 2010
- Preceded by: Michael Mates
- Majority: 1,275 (2.5%)

Personal details
- Born: 27 November 1969 (age 56) Paddington, London, England
- Party: Conservative
- Education: St Ambrose College; Trinity College, Oxford
- Website: damianhinds.com

Damian Patrick George Hinds (born 27 November 1969) is a British Conservative Party politician who has been Shadow Secretary of State for Health and Social Care since August 2026. He has served as Member of Parliament (MP) for East Hampshire since 2010. He previously served as Secretary of State for Education under Theresa May from 2018 to 2019; he has also held junior ministerial positions under four Prime Ministers.

Hinds was appointed Exchequer Secretary to the Treasury by David Cameron in 2015. He was moved to the post of Minister of State for Employment in 2016 following Theresa May's appointment as prime minister. In May's 2018 cabinet reshuffle he was promoted to Secretary of State for Education. He lost this position following Boris Johnson's appointment as prime minister in 2019. He returned to government in 2021 as Minister of State for Security and Borders. He returned to the backbenches on 7 July 2022, resigning in protest to Johnson's leadership. He was appointed Minister of State for Prisons, Parole and Probation by new Prime Minister Rishi Sunak in October 2022, before becoming Schools Minister in November 2023.

== Early life and career ==
Damian Hinds was born on 27 November 1969 in Paddington, London. He was educated at St Ambrose College, a voluntary aided Roman Catholic grammar school in Hale Barns, Greater Manchester. Hinds studied Philosophy, politics and economics at Trinity College, University of Oxford, attaining a first class degree. Whilst at Oxford, he served as President of the Oxford Union.

Before becoming an MP, Hinds spent 18 years working in the brewing and hotel industries, in Britain and abroad.

== Parliamentary career ==
Hinds stood as the Conservative candidate in Stretford and Urmston at the 2005 general election, coming second with 30.4% of the vote behind the incumbent Labour MP Beverley Hughes.

=== In government ===
At the 2010 general election, Hinds was elected as Member of Parliament for East Hampshire with 56.8% of the vote and a majority of 13,467.

Hinds sat on the Education Select Committee between 2010 and 2012. He was also a member of the Public Bill Committee for the Defence Reform Act 2014.

At the 2015 general election, Hinds was re-elected as MP for East Hampshire with an increased vote share of 60.7% and an increased majority of 25,147.

In the run-up to the referendum of 2016, he campaigned in favour of the UK remaining in the European Union. He was made Minister of State for Employment by Prime Minister Theresa May on 17 July 2016.

Hinds was again re-elected at the snap 2017 general election with an increased vote share of 63.6% and an increased majority of 25,852.

In the 2018 cabinet reshuffle he was appointed as Secretary of State for Education, succeeding Justine Greening, who resigned rather than changing position.

In January 2018, Hinds spoke in Parliament about his interest in the Catholic education sector and the admissions rules that apply to faith free schools.

During his tenure as education secretary, Hinds introduced First Aid and CPR courses to school curriculums and launched a campaign to increase awareness of the importance of technical skills and apprenticeships' education.

Hinds lost his post as education secretary on 24 July 2019 following the appointment of Boris Johnson as prime minister.

At the 2019 general election, Hinds was again re-elected, with a decreased vote share of 58.8% and a decreased majority of 19,696.

Hinds returned to government on 13 August 2021 as Minister of State for Security following the resignation of James Brokenshire on health grounds. In a cabinet reshuffle on 15 September 2021 his ministerial title changed to Minister of State for Security and Borders. He resigned as minister on 7 July 2022, amid the July 2022 United Kingdom government crisis.

=== In opposition ===
At the 2024 general election, Hinds was again re-elected, with a decreased vote share of 36.9% and a decreased majority of 1,275.

On 8 July 2024, Hinds was appointed as Shadow Secretary of State for Education in Rishi Sunak's shadow cabinet. When Kemi Badenoch won the leadership election, he was removed from the shadow cabinet. In December 2024, he replaced Mims Davies on the Culture, Media and Sport Committee.

In August 2026, Hinds was appointed Shadow Secretary of State for Health and Social Care during the 2026 British shadow cabinet reshuffle by Conservative leader Kemi Badenoch. He had previously been a backbencher.

In September 2026, Hinds voted against the Terminally Ill Adults (End of Life) Bill.

== Personal life ==
Hinds married Jacqui Morel, a teacher, on 11 August 2007. They have three children.

== Notes ==
Parliament of the United Kingdom
| Preceded by Michael Mates | Member of Parliament for East Hampshire; 2010–present | Incumbent |
Political offices
| Preceded by Priti Patel | Exchequer Secretary to the Treasury; 2015–2016 | Succeeded by Andrew Jones |
| Preceded by Priti Patel | Minister of State for Employment; 2016–2018 | Succeeded by Alok Sharma |
| Preceded by Justine Greening | Secretary of State for Education; 2018–2019 | Succeeded by Gavin Williamson |
| Preceded by James Brokenshire | Minister of State for Security; 2021 | Succeeded by Himself as Minister of State for Security and Borders |
| Preceded by Himself as Minister of State for Security | Minister of State for Security and Borders; 2021–2022 | Succeeded by Stephen McPartland as Minister of State for Security |
| Preceded by Bridget Phillipson | Shadow Secretary of State for Education; 2024 | Succeeded by Laura Trott |
