= Minister of State for Security =

Senior ministerial position in the Government of the United Kingdom

United Kingdom Minister of State for Security
- Royal Arms of His Majesty's Government

- Flag of the United Kingdom

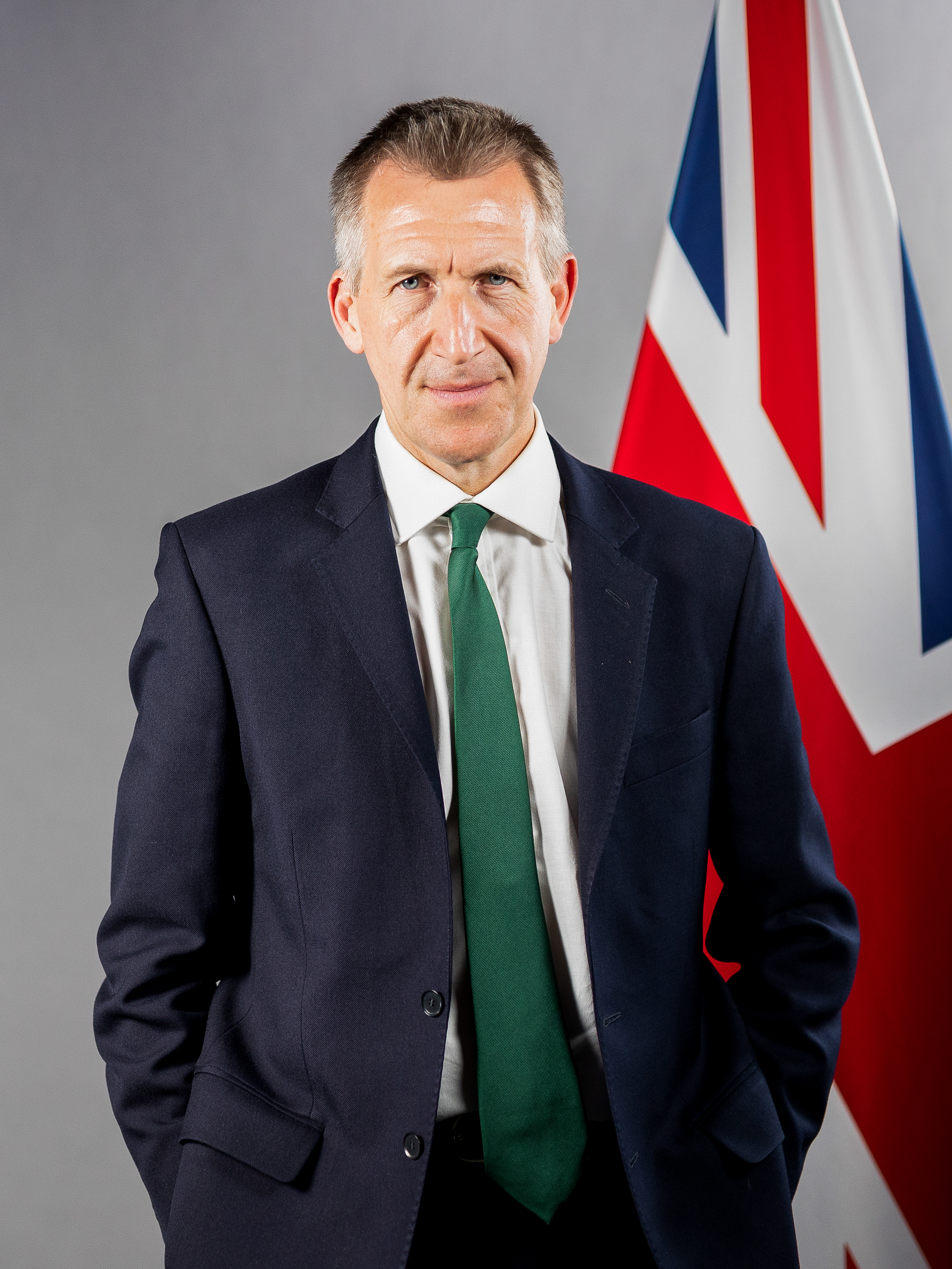
- Incumbent; Dan Jarvis since 21 July 2026
- Home Office; Cabinet Office
- Style: Security Minister (informal); The Right Honourable (within the UK and Commonwealth)
- Type: Minister of the Crown
- Status: Minister of State
- Member of: Cabinet (attending); Privy Council; National Security Council
- Reports to: Prime Minister of the United Kingdom; Home Secretary
- Seat: Westminster
- Nominator: Prime Minister
- Appointer: The Monarch; (on the advice of the Prime Minister)
- Term length: At His Majesty's pleasure
- Formation: 29 May 2002 as Minister of State for Citizenship, Immigration and Counter Terrorism; 7 July 2022 as Minister of State for Security
- First holder: Beverley Hughes as Minister of State for Citizenship, Immigration and Counter Terrorism
- Salary: £115,824 per annum (2022) (including £86,584 MP salary)
- Website: gov.uk

The minister of state for security is a senior ministerial position in the government of the United Kingdom, falling under the Home Office and Cabinet Office. The post was created by then-Prime Minister Gordon Brown on 3 June 2009 by splitting the now-defunct post of the minister for security, counter-terrorism, crime and policing between this post (then called Minister for Security and Counter-Terrorism) and the new post of Minister for Crime and Policing.

In a cabinet reshuffle on 15 September 2021, the ministerial title changed to Minister of State for Security and Borders.

The post is generally seen as one of the most senior Minister of State positions, and as such its holder is often invited to attend cabinet meetings.

The office is shadowed by the Shadow Minister for Security who sits on the Official Opposition frontbench.

== Ministers ==
Name	Portrait	Term of office		Political party	PM	Home Sec.
Minister of State for Citizenship, Immigration and Counter Terrorism
Beverley Hughes		29 May 2002	1 April 2004	Labour	Blair	Blunkett
Parliamentary Under-Secretary of State for Policing, Security and Community Safety
Hazel Blears		13 June 2003	5 May 2006	Labour	Blair	Blunkett; Clarke
Minister of State for Security, Counter-Terrorism, Crime and Policing
Tony McNulty		5 May 2006	3 October 2008	Labour	Blair; Brown	Reid; Smith
Minister of State for Policing, Crime and Security
Vernon Coaker		3 October 2008	3 June 2009	Labour	Brown	Smith
Minister of State for Security, Counter-Terrorism, Crime and Policing
David Hanson		10 June 2009	11 May 2010	Labour	Brown	Johnson
Parliamentary Under-Secretary of State for Security and Counter-Terrorism
Alan West, Baron West of Spithead		28 June 2007	12 May 2010	Labour	Brown	Smith; Johnson
Minister of State for Security and Counter-Terrorism
Pauline Neville-Jones, Baroness Neville-Jones		12 May 2010	9 May 2011	Conservative	Cameron	May
Parliamentary Under-Secretary of State for Crime and Security
James Brokenshire		9 May 2011	8 February 2014	Conservative	Cameron	May
Minister of State for Security and Immigration
James Brokenshire		8 February 2014	14 July 2016	Conservative	Cameron	May
Minister of State for Security
John Hayes		8 May 2015	15 July 2016	Conservative	Cameron	May
Minister of State for Security and Economic Crime
Ben Wallace		17 July 2016	24 July 2019	Conservative	May	Rudd; Javid
Minister of State for Security and Deputy for Brexit
Brandon Lewis (Note: Also attending Cabinet.)		24 July 2019	13 February 2020	Conservative	Johnson	Patel
Minister of State for Security
James Brokenshire		13 February 2020	7 July 2021	Conservative	Johnson	Patel
Minister of State for Security and Borders
Damian Hinds		13 August 2021	7 July 2022	Conservative	Johnson	Patel
Minister of State for Security
Stephen McPartland		7 July 2022	6 September 2022	Conservative	Johnson	Patel
Tom Tugendhat		6 September 2022	5 July 2024	Conservative	Truss; Sunak	Braverman; Shapps; Braverman; Cleverly
Dan Jarvis		6 July 2024	11 June 2026	Labour	Starmer	Cooper; Mahmood
Angela Eagle		12 June 2026	20 July 2026	Labour	Starmer	Mahmood
Dan Jarvis		21 July 2026	Incumbent	Labour	Burnham	Mahmood
