= Family policy in Iceland =

The Icelandic family model can be compared to that of the Anglo-Saxon model in regards to its benefits and the Scandinavian model in regards services. Iceland was seen as a lagging country compared to other European countries in terms of family policy. Family policy in Iceland had been long ignored by its policy makers. Not until 1994 when the United Nations celebrated the Year of Family. After the recognition of the importance of family by the United Nations, Iceland's parliament sought to establish a resolution to the concept of family policy that was gaining greater political attention in Iceland.

== History ==
=== Past policies ===
During the 1990s, before the United Nations' Year of Family Iceland was spending roughly 18% GDP on welfare and health care. This percentage was quite low compared to other European countries. This percentage spent on both healthcare and welfare seemed looked even thinner because Iceland has more children per family than other European countries with more progressive health care and social policies. After Iceland made the decision to implement more progressive family policies the Minister of Social Affairs appointed The Family Council in 1998. This council helped implement policies like those for paternity leave in 1998 which allowed men to take one third of the paid parental leave. During the 1990s there was also policies enacted that gave both men and women equal legal care for children. Children's care hours and after school activities were more highly funded during this time to establish more child friendly policies for working-class families. These policies were quite essential to Iceland's work force because on average more married men and women took part in the public and private workforce of Iceland. Numerous progressive policies have been established for Iceland since the 1900s so that the position of the Icelandic family would be strengthened.

=== Modern changes ===
The Icelandic family policy framework has shifted greatly from a model that was established as a single "breadwinner" family into a dual working and equal rights parent structure. In the years between 1970 and 1980 single parent households had proportionate rights. The modern model does strictly offer progressive benefits to families on the means test of income. Housing benefits have been a modern adaptation into the Icelandic family welfare system. Although there have been additional hours added to preschools in Iceland there are still no legal rights to preschool. There is financial assistance available to single and dual parent households. A single parent household receives about twice as much financial assistance than a dual parent household. This highlights the less progressive policies for wealth distribution. Iceland's family policy was re-structured for the equality of men and women in order to distribute balanced family welfare policies and its responsibilities. The framework of family is important to the people of Iceland because they believe social emotional connections develop from the home to the society around them. Although preschools are not mandatory for children to attend, Iceland sets up a structure that makes it most beneficial for both children and their working parents. Icelandic family policy makes child development a fundamental basis for much of their social policy in order to allow them to better develop their intellectual and emotional qualities at a younger age than most other countries. Work settings also help implement gender and family policies by private corporations implementing social policies to help support their government's mission for equality and progress.

=== Future goals ===
Since appointing a special Family Council in 1998 and the present Social Security system, Iceland has implemented substantial progressive family policies from extended preschool to counseling and education on sexual matters. Iceland's Social Security works hand in hand with municipalities and examines different provisions that could be introduced to not only better municipalities but the country as a whole. Although Iceland has made substantial progress in its parental leave policy, it still is shorter than other Nordic countries. Iceland passed and then repealed a policy that extended parental leave to twelve months which could have been compared to Sweden's 480 days of paid parental leave in 2016. In 2012, Eydal and Friðriksdóttir was passed and stated that parents who did not live with their children did not receive any benefits from the family welfare policies. Fertility rates have always remained constant or have never been an issue to agrees until recent years. In 2014, 4,326 births were reported which was a decline from 4,533 in 2012. This compared to fertility rates in 1950 when women were having more than four children per household. The age of first time mothers was up from 27 in 2013 to 30 in 2013. These trend are due to a highly developed work force and equal rights for men and women. Women are choosing careers that used to be synonymous to men and are taking advantage of the career opportunities earned. Costs of living have gone up as well as costs of normal and cheap goods which alarms prospective first time parents to be more financially secure. The decrease in fertility is also in part due to the education and counseling that both men and women receive in Iceland at a young age in sexual reproduction. Those who choose to have children are incentivized with progressive policies aiming at enhancing both emotional and physical stability and progress. Children have universal benefits in Iceland if they age 7 years of age or less. The Social Security System in Iceland re-affirms how critical these early years are for children especially in terms of instilling social and intellectual frameworks in the minds of children who will become the leaders of that same country as well as political activists.
