= Family policy in Spain =

Family policy in Spain refers to the implementation of public policy measures that aim to support the social actions carried out by families, as well as define family roles and relationships within Spain. These laws and services provide Spanish families with provisions regarding parental leave, childcare, family allowances, marriage, divorce, and cohabitation.

== History ==
=== Franco era ===
Spain is categorized within the Southern European social model, due largely in part to its strong dependence on family assistance and support. Rather than promoting state reliance, the predominance of the male breadwinner model and the family-oriented nature of social measures in Spain has hindered the development of effective family policies, according to the South European Society and Politics journal. In Francoist Spain from 1939 until 1975, strong state intervention established social protections for families; however, these programs provided fragmented coverage for male industrial workers and their families exclusively. Those working in the agriculture sector as well as women, who were highly unemployed, received little to no benefits in regards to family protections. Family policy during this time mainly served to encourage large families, especially through the promotion of measures such as the 1943, Large Family Law which rewarded families with the largest number of children.

=== Restoration to democracy ===
After Spain became a democracy and established its Constitution in 1978, family policy profoundly changed to reflect a new emphasis on promoting work-life balance. This led to the elimination of payments for marriage and for those given after the birth of each child. For employed individuals, the main benefit was payments transferred monthly for those with dependent children, as well as various extensions of maternity leave and childcare provisions. These policies gave women the chance to possess a more participatory role within Spain's overall workforce, rather than remaining solely in the domestic sphere. Bringing together family and employment obligations through family policy, however, still took a number of years to fully develop. The legacy of Francoist Spain, in which married women were strongly encouraged to stay home, continued to hamper women's efforts in gaining employment and receiving state-paid family assistance.

== Current situation ==
Spain's total fertility rate (TFR) declined steadily from 2.78 children born per women in the late 1970s to a low of 1.10 in 2024, one of the lowest in the European Union. The average age at first birth has also been rising, from 29.52 in 2002 to 32.29 in 2024. The economic crisis of 2008 deepened these trends, as austerity measures reduced spending on family support: the cheque bebé, a universal birth bonus introduced in 2007, was for instance abolished as early as 2011 under spending cuts. Successive governments have since introduced a series of interventions, including means-tested income support, childcare expansion, and parental leave reform. These measures aim to address the structural barriers to family formation identified in the literature, including labour market insecurity, housing costs, and unequal access to affordable childcare, while promoting work-life balance and gender equality.

=== Family allowances ===
Spain's main means-tested family support is the child supplement linked to the Ingreso Mínimo Vital (IMV), a monthly payment targeting low-income households with children. The Spanish government has proposed a universal child benefit of €200 per month per child under 18, included in its Sustainable Development Strategy 2030, which would extend support to all families regardless of income. As of early 2026, the measure has not yet been passed into law and remains subject to parliamentary approval and budget allocation. Evidence suggests that unconditional child benefits of this kind can significantly increase fertility, with additional effects on maternal labour supply and family stability.

=== Childcare provision ===
Public childcare for children aged 0 to 3 has received growing policy attention in Spain in recent decades, though access remains uneven across regions. The 2020 Ley Orgánica de Modificación de la LOE (LOMLOE) education reform officially recognized the 0 to 3 age group as part of the national education system, representing a shift toward treating early childcare as a public entitlement rather than a private arrangement. Access to free childcare, however, remains incomplete, with provision still largely dependent on regional funding decisions and capacity. At the same time, since 2021 the Spanish government has allocated over €670 million to autonomous communities to support the creation of over 65,000 new public childcare places, including €32.2 million allocated in September 2024 to seven autonomous communities, as part of the Recovery, Transformation and Resilience Plan. Research drawing on regional variation in childcare availability has found a positive and statistically significant association between public childcare expansion and fertility among employed women.

=== Parental leave reform ===
Spain's parental leave system has been progressively reformed since the early 2000s. While maternity leave has been protected under Spanish law since the 1980s, paternity leave was only introduced in 2007 at two days, before being extended incrementally and equalized with maternity leave at 16 weeks in January 2021, a reform framed in terms of gender equality and the redistribution of care responsibilities within households. In July 2025, entitlement was further extended to 19 weeks per parent, with full wage replacement, additional provisions for single parents, and a flexible clause allowing two weeks to be taken at any point until the child turns 8. Given the recency of this reform, no empirical assessment of its effects is yet possible. Comparative evidence from other European countries suggests that non-transferable paternity leave tends to reduce the career penalties borne disproportionately by mothers, though earlier Spanish evidence indicates that mandated paternity leave may also modestly increase the perceived cost of children for both parents.

=== Regional variation ===
Spain's decentralised political structure means that family policy implementation varies considerably across the seventeen autonomous communities. Beyond the national framework, regions are responsible for key social and educational services, producing significant disparities in access. Enrolment of children aged 0 to 3 in public childcare is notably higher in the Basque Country, Catalonia, Aragon, and Madrid, and lower in areas of southern Spain, reflecting differences in regional policy priorities and funding decisions. The Basque Country also stands out for more generous local family allowances for lower-income households.
