= Westminster Digital =

British video production company

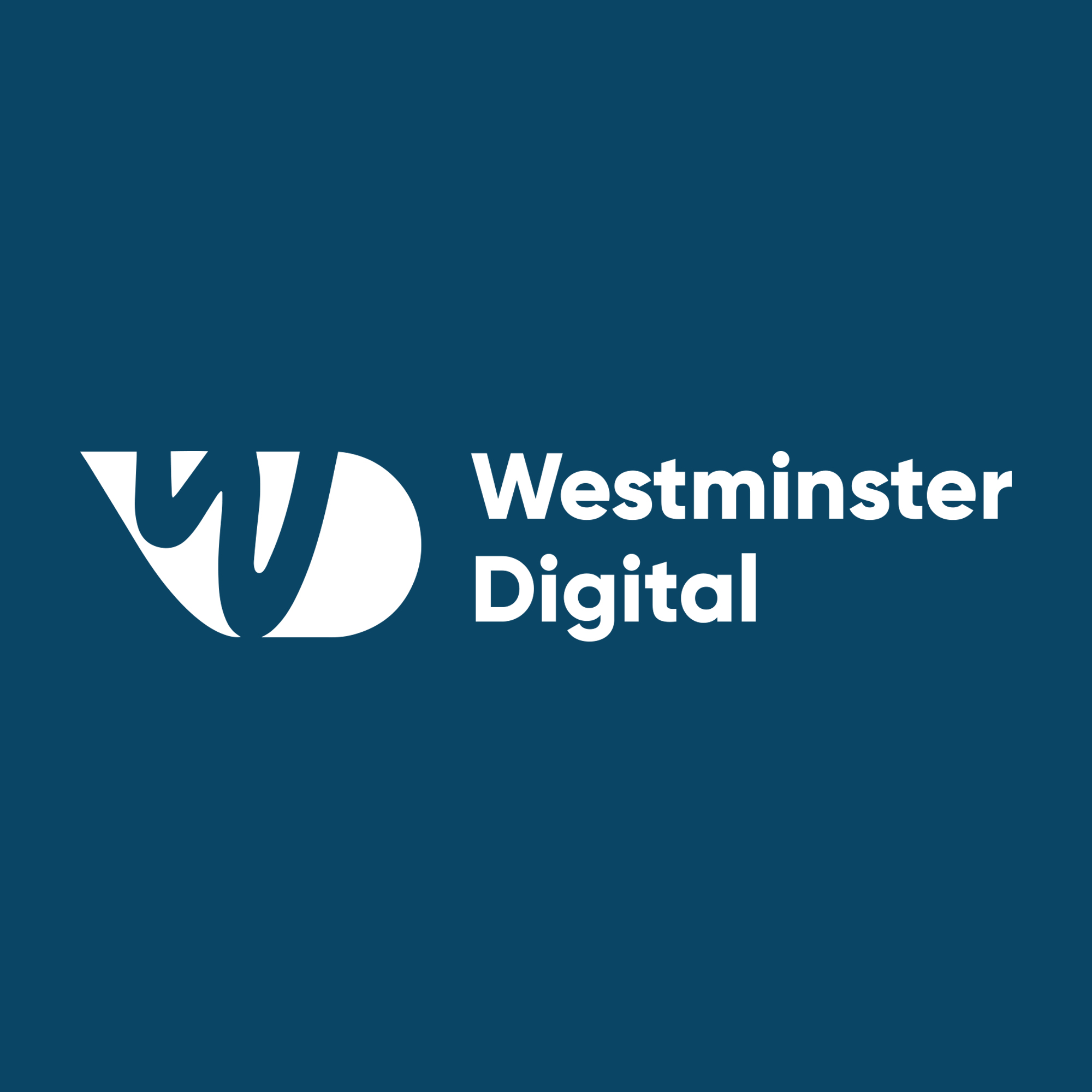
- Founded: 2017
- Founder: Thomas Corbett-Dillon
- Headquarters: London, UK

Westminster Digital was a British video production company founded by Thomas Craig Corbett-Dillon which specialized in producing promotional sixty to ninety-second Facebook clips about local issues for Conservative Members of Parliament. The company is said to have produced videos for most of the candidates in the 2019 Conservative Party leadership election and for up to 50 MPs during the 2019 United Kingdom general election.

The company was renamed WD International Holdings in February 2024, at which time Companies House reported both its accounts and confirmation statement as being overdue.

== History ==
Craig Dillon, a former YouTuber and Sky News digital producer, who studied TV production at the University of Westminster, founded the company as Westminster Analytics in November 2017. The company was renamed Westminster Digital in May 2019 and Thomas Dixon was appointed managing director in August of that year. In November 2020 Dixon was registered as having ownership of around one-third of the company's shares, with the remainder under ownership of the founder and CEO, Dillon.

Westminster Digital's collection of up to £165,000 (according to one estimate) of government funds for the creation of Facebook videos and other social media content for MPs was controversial. Despite the MPs claiming the expenses legally as payments from their office costs budget and justifying them as cheaper than employing a full-time communications staff, critics have called them a waste of taxpayers' money. Although no complete public list of MPs who have claimed for services from Westminster Digital exists, their clients are known to have included Michael Gove, Matt Hancock, Sajid Javid, Liz Truss and Boris Johnson.

The company's managing director and minority shareholder Thomas Dixon resigned and their work on the July–September 2022 Conservative Party leadership election campaign for Penny Mordaunt was concluded in July 2022. This followed accusations of astroturfing and a viral appearance by CEO Craig Dillon (under the pseudonym Thomas Corbett-Dillon) on Tucker Carlson Tonight, which was described as a “distraction”. In September of that year, Dixon's minority share in the company passed to Thomas Borwick's College Green Group.
