= Blackfen School for Girls =

Location
- Blackfen Road, Sidcup; Borough of Bexley, Greater London, DA15 9NU; England
- Coordinates: 51.448°N 0.112°E

Information
- Type: Academy
- Department for Education URN: 137965 Tables
- Ofsted: Reports
- Headteacher: Carrie senior
- Gender: Girls (secondary); Mixed (sixth form)
- Age: 11 to 19
- Enrolment: 1,1398
- Capacity: 1500
- Colours: Navy and Red
- Website: http://www.blackfenschoolforgirls.co.uk/

Blackfen School for Girls is a girls' secondary school and sixth form with academy status, located in Blackfen in the London Borough of Bexley, England. Although it is a girls school, the sixth form over the past few years has become mixed. This is due to the partner school Hurstmere Foundation School having no sixth form, so many pupils from Hurstmere join the sixth form in Blackfen school.

== Description ==
The headmaster is currently Matthew Brown, having previously been Louise Sharples. The school gained specialist status in Maths and Computing in 2004. Compared with many other secondary schools in the area, it is one of the highest achieving in terms of GCSE and A-level results. The percentage of students gaining five or more A* to C, including English and Mathematics was almost 64% in 2011, an 8% increase on the previous year. Five or more A* to C grades were gained by 82% of students and almost 25% of students gained three A* or A grades.

The school converted to academy status on 1 April 2012.

Ofsted considers this to be a good school and has not done a full inspection since it converted to an academy in 2012. Ofsted reported in 2019 that the students are happy and safe, and like the way that the head teacher knows all their names and addresses them individually. They like the vertical tutor groups as it helps them integrate with everyone across the years. They like the broad and aspirational Key Stage 3 curriculum, which includes dance and drama. The school is aware that their Spanish offer is not as strong as their French. Law is one of the subjects offered as an option in Key Stage 4, and this is taught on three levels.
