= Family policy in the Republic of Ireland =

Family support is one of the main issues that most social policies in Ireland try to address. Family policies in Ireland are at a higher percentage rate than other liberal democracies; 2.5 percent of all policies or 1.6 percent of GDP. The typical family unit in Ireland is the nuclear family with children at 49 percent, with families without children, 21 percent, and single mothers, 15 percent, being the next two common family types. In Babies and Bosses, it states that "the main Irish support for families is the universal non-taxable Child Benefit (paid for children under the age 16 or 16–19 and in full time education), which trebled in value between 1997 and 2002. The Irish in-work benefit, the Family Income Supplement (FIS) is paid to low-income families with dependent children, where parents work at least 19 hours per week between them, to provide financial incentives for low-skill jobless families to enter work and because of the lower hours limit ensures that it is paid to those who are more than marginally attached to the labor market". As Millar, Coen, Bradley and Rau state in their article on parenting, work, and family policies, "the growing number of Irish women engaged in paid work contributed significantly to economic growth and the so-called "Celtic Tiger" boom, from only 7.5 percent in 1971 to 48.8 percent in 2004". They also state that because of the increase of female labor participation, most Irish women suffer from "dual burden", which is because family policies have lagged, leaving no support for child care services. Even though family policies are a bigger concern in Ireland compared to other liberal democracies, the Irish female labor participation is much lower. There is still plenty of improvements that need to be made in Irish family policies.
