= Family policy in the United Kingdom =

Government measures that attempt to support families in the United Kingdom

Family policy in the United Kingdom has experienced numerous shifts throughout the nation’s history. Throughout the 17th and 18th centuries, the UK had one of the most liberal family planning regimes in Europe, with little state involvement. However, this began to shift during the Industrial Revolution, and especially during the post-war years and the New Labour era. The post-recession Conservative era has initiated reforms to the comparatively broad family provisions.

== History ==
Historically, the United Kingdom has had a limited approach towards family planning, primarily because of policymakers’ belief on a “classic liberal” conception of the welfare state. This implied a reliance on free-market solutions and a state reluctant to fund welfare provisions for families. Laws passed in the 17th and 18th centuries regarding families were rare and generally aimed at fixing “inefficiencies” in the system or addressing the most serious societal issues stemming from marriage. For example, in 1753, English law mandated that minors under the age of 21 could only marry if provided consent by their parents. However, Scotland resisted this law and maintained its comparatively loose marriage laws; for a long time, Gretna Green, the first village in Scotland on the London-Edinburgh route, was a popular place for runaway lovers who wanted to marry. Overall, the UK’s laws were far more liberal than other states in Europe. It was only during the Industrial Revolution that these views began to change, and the Welfare State in the UK began to emerge; with it, family policy changed considerably.

== Shift in Family Policy ==
The post-war conditions in UK led to numerous momentous changes in family policy. One of the most important trends was the shift in the historical conception of the male as the breadwinner and the female as the homemaker. Divorce was made easier to obtain. In 1969, Parliament passed the Divorce Reform Act, which established the no-fault divorce; the effect of these and other change was the increase of divorce from 2.1 out of 1000 in 1961 to 12.7 in 1987. The UK state hit its peak when it comes to family policy during the New Labour era, which came to power in 1997. New and wide-ranging initiatives that centered on the family were established. These included “children’s early education and care, services to stabilise and improve the quality of family relations especially in low-income sectors of the population, parental employment and greater flexibility in work and family life.” Some of these proposals were heavily controversial, since the New Labour’s emphasis on “Strengthening marriages.” Many skeptics viewed this as the state promoting “desirable family forms” at the expense of newer methods in today’s diverse family life.

== Conservative austerity ==
The 2008 financial crisis led to the United Kingdom government austerity programme to balance the budget. The post-recession environment though lead policymakers to implement austerity measures on what became a relatively vast welfare state regarding families. Conservatives in Parliament have been influenced by a policy of “smaller state, bigger society,” i.e. a lesser role for the government and a greater one for civil society. For instance, the UK budget in 2015 announced the end of tax credits for families for their third or subsequent child. Though Treasury officials denied that this move was an attempt to influence families on how many children they should have, critics labeled it a de facto “two-child policy”. However, indications point to the Conservative government limiting austerity-driven proposals, as Prime Minister Theresa May has introduced 30 hours of free child care for three and four year olds.

== See also ==
- English family law
- Scottish family law
