= Friends of Democracy (disambiguation) =

The Friends of Democracy is a Barbadian political party.

Friends of Democracy may also refer to:

- Friends of Democracy PAC, PAC that merged with the Public Campaign Action Fund to form Every Voice
- Friends of Democracy, Inc., antifascist propaganda group founded by Leon Milton Birkhead

== See also ==
- Friends of Democracy in Greece, the name of the League for Democracy in Greece after 1974
- Parliamentary Friends of Democracy, an Australian parliamentary group co-founded by MP Andrew Hastie
- Friends of a Democratic Cuba
- Friends of Democratic Cuba
- Friends of Democratic Pakistan
- Friends of Democratic Syria
