= London South East (European Parliament constituency) =

Former European Parliament constituency

- European Parliament constituency
- Boundary within London (1979-1984)
- Member state: United Kingdom
- Created: 1979
- Dissolved: 1999
- MEPs: 1

Prior to its uniform adoption of proportional representation in 1999, the United Kingdom used first-past-the-post for the European elections in England, Scotland and Wales. The European Parliament constituencies used under that system were smaller than the later regional constituencies and only had one Member of the European Parliament each.

The constituency of London South East was one of them.

When it was created in England in 1979, it consisted of the Westminster Parliament constituencies of Beckenham, Bexleyheath, Chislehurst, Erith and Crayford, Orpington, Ravensbourne, Sidcup, Woolwich East and Woolwich West.

United Kingdom Parliamentary constituencies were redrawn in 1983 and the European constituencies were altered to reflect this. The new seat comprised the following Westminster constituencies: Beckenham, Bexleyheath, Chislehurst, Eltham, Erith and Crayford, Greenwich, Old Bexley and Sidcup, Orpington, Ravensbourne and Woolwich. These boundaries were used in 1984 and 1989. Greenwich was removed for the 1994 European Parliament election.

Boundary within South East England and London (1984-1994)

Boundary within South East England and London (1994-1999)

== Members of the European Parliament ==
Elected	Members	Party
1979	Brandon Rhys-Williams	Conservative
1984	Peter Price	Conservative
1989	Peter Price	Conservative
1994	Shaun Spiers	Labour
1999	Constituency abolished: see London	

== Elections results ==
European Parliament election, 1979: London South East
Party	Candidate	Votes	%	±%
Conservative	Brandon Rhys-Williams	94,180	55.0	N/A
Labour	S. Bundred	54,798	32.0	N/A
Liberal	Jonathan Fryer	21,494	12.5	N/A
Against Wealth Extremes	W. E. Turner	890	0.5	N/A
Majority		39,382	23.0	N/A
Turnout		171,362	34.3	N/A
Conservative win (new seat)				

European Parliament election, 1984: London South East
Party	Candidate	Votes	%	±%
Conservative	Peter Price	81,508	44.6	▼10.3
Labour	Steven J. Cowan	61,493	33.7	▲1.7
Liberal	Jonathan Fryer	38,614	21.2	▲8.6
Marxist	W. E. Turner	989	0.5	Steady
Majority		20,015	11.0	▼12.0
Turnout		182,604	32.5	▼1.8
Conservative hold		Swing	▼6.0	

European Parliament election, 1989: London South East
Party	Candidate	Votes	%	±%
Conservative	Peter Price	80,619	38.2	▼6.4
Labour	David J. Earnshaw	73,029	34.6	▲0.9
Green	Dr. Euan C. McPhee	37,576	17.8	N/A
SDP	Anthony A. Kinch	10,196	4.8	N/A
SLD	Mrs. Mary C. Williams	9,052	4.3	▼16.9
Pensioner Non-Careerist Marxist Leninist Mao	W. E. Turner	456	0.2	▼0.3
Majority		7,590	3.6	▼7.4
Turnout		210,928	37.8	▲5.3
Conservative hold		Swing	▼3.7	

European Parliament Election 1994: London South East
Party	Candidate	Votes	%	±%
Labour	Shaun Spiers	71,505	40.9	▲6.2
Conservative	Peter Price	63,483	36.3	▼1.9
Liberal Democrats	Jonathan Fryer	25,271	14.4	▲10.1
Green	Ian Mouland	6,399	3.7	▼14.2
Liberal	Robin Almond	3,881	2.2	N/A
National Front	Kevin Lowne	2,926	1.7	N/A
Natural Law	John Small	1,025	0.6	N/A
Majority		8,022	4.6	▲1.0
Turnout		174,990	35.4	▼2.4
Labour gain from Conservative		Swing	▲4.1	
