= Cyril Townsend =

British politician (1937–2013)

Sir Cyril Townsend

Member of Parliament for Bexleyheath
- In office 28 February 1974 – 8 April 1997
- Preceded by: Constituency established
- Succeeded by: Constituency abolished

Personal details
- Born: 21 December 1937 Woking, Surrey, England
- Died: 20 November 2013 (aged 75) Chillaton, Devon, England
- Party: Conservative; Liberal Democrats
- Spouse: Anita Walshe
- Military career
- Allegiance: United Kingdom
- Branch: British Army
- Service years: 1958–1968
- Rank: Captain
- Service number: 455112
- Unit: Durham Light Infantry
- Conflicts: Cyprus Emergency; Indonesia–Malaysia confrontation

Sir Cyril David Townsend (21 December 1937 − 20 November 2013) was a British politician.

Townsend was elected Conservative Member of Parliament for Bexleyheath at the February 1974 election, and held the seat until retiring at the 1997 election.

== Early life ==
Townsend was born in Woking to Lois Henderson and Lieutenant Colonel Cyril Townsend. He was educated at Bradfield College and Sandhurst.

== Military career ==
He was commissioned in 1958 into the Durham Light Infantry. He served during the end of the Cyprus Emergency. He was promoted to captain in December 1963. In 1966 he fought in Malaysia in the confrontation with Indonesia. He was the Hong Kong Governor's aide-de-camp from 1964 to 1966, and in March 1968, after two years serving as adjutant to the first battalion of the Durham Light Infantry, retired from the army at the rank of captain.

== Politics ==
After joining the Conservative Party, Townsend was recruited as a personal assistant by Edward Heath, the party leader, in 1968. When the party returned to government in 1970 he became political secretary to the leader of the Greater London Council, Sir Desmond Plummer. In 1972 he was selected as the new Conservative candidate for Bexleyheath, whose predecessor constituency, Bexley, Edward Heath had left in favour of neighbouring Sidcup due to boundary changes. In February 1974 Townsend was elected with a majority of 3686 votes, despite his party being defeated overall and the seat being considered marginal.

=== Member of Parliament ===
Townsend was made a member of the Select Committee on Violence in the Family, and concerned about child sexual abuse, was the sponsor of the Protection of Children Act 1978, which he introduced as a private member's bill in 1977.

A liberal Conservative, he never obtained ministerial office under Margaret Thatcher, whom he frequently opposed. In 1979, after six months as Parliamentary private secretary to Reg Prentice, he resigned over immigration restrictions on Asian fiancés. He criticised Geoffrey Howe's 1981 budget and in November 1982 was the only Conservative MP to oppose benefit cuts. A strong supporter of local government, he opposed the Local Government Act 1985, including the abolition of the Greater London Council. In 1988 and 1989 he opposed the government's move not to increase child benefit.

As a former officer he advocated a robust defence policy, supporting the Trident nuclear programme and opposing defence cuts under John Major. He also supported the boycott of the Moscow Olympics in 1980 in response to the Soviet–Afghan War, and was elected eight times as vice-chair of the Tory backbenchers' defence committee. However, he opposed Thatcher's "Fortress Falklands" policy and sought reconciliation and negotiation with Argentina. In 1983 this led to his removal from the Select Committee on Foreign Affairs. In 1988 he was in charge of a Parliamentary Designation to Iran.

Townsend was pro-European, advocating Britain's membership of the European Exchange Rate Mechanism. He criticised Thatcher for her Euroscepticism, which led to him supporting Michael Heseltine in the 1990 Tory leadership election. As a result, in January 1991 the executive of his constituency association proposed to make him stand for reselection, with Townsend's critics saying that he was a maverick who failed to consult his local party on key issues. The motion fell when put to the full association the next month.

After retaining his seat at the 1992 general election with a majority of 14,086, he served on the Foreign Affairs Select Committee. After the 1997 boundary changes he was not selected as a candidate for Bexleyheath and Crayford and left Parliament having been knighted in the 1997 New Year Honours.

=== Outside Parliament ===
Townsend was part of the Council for Arab-British Understanding. He served as joint chair during the 1980s, and became joint president in 1996. After retiring from Parliament he took this role full-time until stepping down in 2002. He served as an observer for the European Union at the 1996 Palestinian elections.

In 2005 he became disillusioned with the Conservatives. In 2006, having joined the Liberal Democrats due to support for European integration, he supported Menzies Campbell's bid for the party leadership.

== Journalism ==
Townsend was a respected journalist who wrote for several Middle Eastern newspapers (including Al-Hayat, for which he wrote a regular column), and was also a regular contributor to the Western Morning News.

== Personal life and death ==
In his youth Townsend enjoyed tennis and skiing, and later he represented the House of Commons in these sports. He sang in the choir at Tavistock church.

In 1976 Townsend married Anita Walshe, with whom he had two sons, Hugh and John.

Townsend died at his home in Chillaton aged 75. He had been suffering from leukaemia.

Parliament of the United Kingdom
| Preceded by (new constituency) | Member of Parliament for Bexleyheath; Feb 1974–1997 | Succeeded by (constituency abolished) |
