= South Devon =

Southern part of Devon, England

Ordnance Survey Half-inch Sheet 36: South Devon, published 1925

South Devon is the southern part of Devon, England. Because most of Devon's population centres lie on the coasts, the county is often divided informally into North Devon and South Devon.

There is no single official definition of the region. Narrow definitions of "South Devon" might refer to parts of Devon south of Exeter and Dartmoor, including some or all of Plymouth, Torbay and the districts of South Hams, West Devon and Teignbridge. More expansive definitions may also include all or parts of East Devon, which includes the seaside resort Exmouth and the Georgian town of Sidmouth.

== Specific uses of the term ==
Natural England defines a natural region of South Devon, National Character Area 151. The area is bounded by the River Tamar in the west, the coastline from Plymouth to Torquay in the south, and the southern boundary of Dartmoor in the north. Either side of Dartmoor it reaches as far north as Chillaton in the west and Chudleigh and Bovey Tracey in the east. Adjacent natural regions are the Cornish Killas to the west of the Tamar Valley, The Culm to the northwest and the Devon Redlands to the northeast.

The South Devon parliamentary constituency includes parts of the Torbay and South Hams districts.

South Devon National Landscape covers a largely coastal strip from Jennycliff Bay in the south of Plymouth to Berry Head in the south of Torbay, encompassing a large part of South Hams.

Visit South Devon, a membership organisation promoting tourism on behalf of local businesses, covers the areas of East Devon, Mid Devon, Teignbridge and South Hams.

== Geography ==
The landscape of South Devon consists of rolling hills dotted with small towns, such as Dartmouth, Ivybridge, Kingsbridge, Salcombe, and Totnes. The towns of Torquay and Paignton are the principal seaside resorts on the south coast. Another notable feature is the coastal railway line between Newton Abbot and the Exe Estuary: the red sandstone cliffs and sea views are very dramatic and in the resorts railway line and beaches are very near.
