= David Madel =

British politician

Sir David Madel

Member of Parliament for South West Bedfordshire South Bedfordshire (1970–1983)
- In office 18 June 1970 – 14 May 2001
- Preceded by: Gwilym Roberts
- Succeeded by: Andrew Selous

Personal details
- Born: 6 August 1938 (age 87)
- Party: Conservative

Sir William David Madel (born 6 August 1938) is a politician in the United Kingdom, who was a member of parliament for the Conservative Party.

== Parliamentary career ==
Madel contested the London seat of Erith and Crayford in a 1965 by-election, and again in the general election the following year, but was beaten on each occasion by Labour's James Wellbeloved.

He was a Conservative Party member of parliament for South Bedfordshire and later South West Bedfordshire for 31 years from 1970 until he stood down at the 2001 general election.

Madel almost suffered one of the biggest upsets of the 1997 general election, when his majority was cut from the 1992 result of 21,273, to just 132 votes.

Parliament of the United Kingdom
Preceded by Gwilym Roberts	Member of Parliament for South Bedfordshire; 1970–1983	Constituency abolished
New constituency	Member of Parliament for South West Bedfordshire; 1983–2001	Succeeded by Andrew Selous
