= R v Bowden =

- Court: Court of Appeal
- Full case name: Regina v. Jonathan Richard Bowden
- Decided: 10 November 1999
- Citation: [2001] QB 88; [2000] 2 WLR 1083; [2000] 2 All ER 418; [2000] 1 Cr App R 438; [2000] 2 Cr App R (S) 26,
- Transcript: bailii.org/ew/cases/EWCA/Crim/1999/2270.html

Case history
- Prior action: Conviction at Cambridge Crown Court. Presided by Haworth J. (unreported)

Court membership
- Judges sitting: Otton LJ, Mrs Justice Smith, Mr Justice Collins

Case opinions
- Per curiam (unanimously): digital and any other making (including re-making) of an indecent photograph of a child is prohibited as specified by a 1978 Act, amended in 1994. The offence can extend to those in a lowly role in part of a more severe, related set of activities, to whom a greater sentence would be applicable.

Keywords
- literal rule; amended statute; indecent photograph; making

In R v Bowden, a 1999 appeal, the English Court of Appeal dismissed a defence effort to depart from the literal rule, the taking of the natural meaning of statutory language. It concerned the making (copying with knowledge of the content) of an indecent photograph of a child. It confirmed it was irrelevant as to whether the offence was committed that these actions were part of a much larger production and distribution effort. That would likely be a relevant consideration at the time of sentencing if the jury found the facts established guilt.

== Facts ==
The police and prosecution could find no evidence nor history of inappropriate behaviour towards children. There was no breach of trust. Bowden's position in the chain of production of indecent material was as low as could be consistent with the commission of the reproducing offence. He downloaded directed photographs, occasionally stored, and printed out photographs.

Bowden had been convicted at the Crown Court (by jury) in Cambridge on 12 counts of making indecent photography of a child contrary to section 1(1)(a) of the Protection of Children Act 1978. Before amended by the Criminal Justice and Public Order Act 1994, section 1(a) of the 1978 Act read:

1.- (1) It is an offence for a person-

(a) to take, or permit to be taken, any indecent photograph of a child

As amended it read:

1.- (1) It is an offence for a person-

(a) to take, or permit to be taken or to make, any indecent photograph or pseudo-photograph of a child

The 1994 Act had added the concept of pseudo-photographs to the law.

The defence team submitted that the making offence applied only to pseudo-photographs. The prosecution submitted that making applied to photographs including digital photographs since the 1978 Act was, as the wording makes clear, seeking to prohibit the spread of indecent photographs as well as their production.

== Judgment ==
It was common ground that amended section covered those making pseudo-photographs who may have had no contact with the subjects of the images. The court confirmed the amended section also forbade anyone making a copy (or copies) of an indecent photograph of a child by, knowing of the content.

The wording in the amended section was clear and unambiguous. The words "to make" had to be given their natural and ordinary meaning, and in the instant context that was "to cause to exist; to produce by action, to bring about".

== Application of related law established as to digital copying ==
The court noted in R v Fellows; R v Arnold (1997) 1 CAR 244, the same court affirmed that a computer file containing data that represented the original photograph in another form was "a copy of a photograph" as per section 7(2) of the 1978 Act.

Therefore, downloading an indecent photograph from the Internet was "making a copy of an indecent photograph" since a copy of that photograph had been caused to exist on the computer to which it had been downloaded.

== See also ==
- English criminal law
