= South West Bedfordshire =

UK Parliament constituency (1983–2024)

Coordinates: 51.958°N 0.491°W

- Former county constituency for the House of Commons
- Boundary of South West Bedfordshire in Bedfordshire

- Location of Bedfordshire within England
- County: Bedfordshire
- Electorate: 79,137 (2018)
- Major settlements: Dunstable, Leighton Buzzard

1983–2024
- Seats: One
- Created from: South Bedfordshire
- Replaced by: Dunstable and Leighton Buzzard; Luton South and South Bedfordshire

South West Bedfordshire was a constituency represented in the House of Commons of the UK Parliament. (Note: South West Bedfordshire is a county constituency (for the purposes of election expenses and type of returning officer).) As with all constituencies of the UK Parliament, it elected one Member of Parliament (MP) by the first past the post system of election.

The serving Member from 2001 to 2024 was Conservative Andrew Selous, who succeeded Conservative David Madel. Selous was re-elected five times: in 2005, 2010, 2015, 2017 and 2019.

Under the 2023 Periodic Review of Westminster constituencies, the constituency was subject to only minor boundary changes, but was renamed Dunstable and Leighton Buzzard with effect from the 2024 general election.

== Constituency profile ==
At the 2011 Census, the population of the constituency was 102,031, of whom 50,277 were male, and 51,754 were female. 74.30% of residents aged 16–74 are economically active, including 4.22% unemployed. A further 13.27% of the population are retired (lower than both the regional average of 14.4% and national average of 13.7%), and 3.75% are students. A statistical compilation by The Guardian showed unemployment benefits claimants in the constituency for April 2013 were 3.3% of the population, lower than the regional average of 3.6%.

Turnout at the 2015 general election was 51,304, or 64.4% of those eligible to vote; lower than the national turnout of 66.4%. This rose at the time of the 2017 general election to 55,635, or 69.8% of those eligible to vote, which was a percentage point higher than the national turnout of 68.8%.

== History ==
The constituency was created in 1983, mostly from the former seat of South Bedfordshire. It was represented by Sir David Madel, a Conservative, from its creation until his retirement in 2001; he almost suffered one of the biggest upsets of the 1997 general election, when the Labour candidate spectacularly slashed his majority from 21,273 in 1992 to just 132.

The last MP for the seat was the Conservative Andrew Selous; he won the seat in 2001, when he managed to increase the party's majority, but only just; this increased somewhat more substantially each time in 2005 and 2010, ultimately to more than 16,000. The 2010 election also saw the second-placed candidate's party change, to the Liberal Democrats, similar to the results of 1983 and 1987, when this was the joint platform for R. Byfield and J.R. Burrow respectively, the (SDP-Liberal Alliance).

== Boundaries and boundary changes ==
=== 1983–1997 ===
- The District of South Bedfordshire wards of Beaudesert, Brooklands, Dunstable Central, Eaton Bray, Heath and Reach, Hockliffe, Houghton Central, Houghton East, Houghton South, Icknield, Kensworth, Linslade, Northfields, Plantation, Priory, Southcott, Stanbridge, Studham, Totternhoe, and Watling; and
- The District of Mid Bedfordshire wards of Aspley, Cranfield, Marston, and Woburn.

The constituency was formed largely from the bulk of the abolished seat of South Bedfordshire, including Dunstable, Houghton Regis, Leighton Buzzard and Linslade. It was extended northwards to include south-western part of Mid Bedfordshire.

=== 1997–2010 ===
Map of boundaries 2010-2024

- The District of South Bedfordshire wards of Beaudesert, Brooklands, Dunstable Central, Eaton Bray, Heath and Reach, Hockliffe, Houghton Central, Houghton East, Houghton South, Icknield, Kensworth, Linslade, Northfields, Plantation, Priory, Southcott, Stanbridge, Studham, Totternhoe, and Watling.

Northern areas (comprising the District of Mid Bedfordshire wards) transferred back to Mid Bedfordshire.

=== 2010–2024 ===
- The Central Bedfordshire unitary authority wards of All Saints, Chiltern, Dunstable Central, Eaton Bray, Grovebury, Heath and Reach, Houghton Hall, Icknield, Kensworth and Totternhoe, Linslade, Manshead, Northfields, Parkside, Planets, Plantation, Southcott, Stanbridge, Tithe Farm, and Watling.

Local authority wards revised, but no changes to boundaries.

== Members of Parliament ==
Election	Member	Party
1983	Sir David Madel	Conservative
2001	Andrew Selous	Conservative

== Elections ==
=== Elections in the 2010s ===
General election 2019: South West Bedfordshire
Party	Candidate	Votes	%	±%
Conservative	Andrew Selous	32,212	60.4	+1.2
Labour	Callum Anderson	13,629	25.6	−8.2
Liberal Democrats	Emma Matanle	5,435	10.2	+5.5
Green	Andrew Waters	2,031	3.8	+2.1
Majority		18,583	34.8	+9.4
Turnout		53,307	66.7	−3.1
Conservative hold		Swing	+4.7	

General election 2017: South West Bedfordshire
Party	Candidate	Votes	%	±%
Conservative	Andrew Selous	32,961	59.2	+4.2
Labour	Daniel Scott	18,793	33.8	+13.5
Liberal Democrats	Daniel Norton	2,630	4.7	−0.5
Green	Morvern Rennie	950	1.7	−2.4
CPA	Morenike Mafoh	301	0.5	New
Majority		14,168	25.4	−9.3
Turnout		55,635	69.8	+5.4
Conservative hold		Swing		

General election 2015: South West Bedfordshire
Party	Candidate	Votes	%	±%
Conservative	Andrew Selous	28,212	55.0	+2.2
Labour	Daniel Scott	10,399	20.3	+0.7
UKIP	John van Weenen	7,941	15.5	+11.3
Liberal Democrats	Stephen Rutherford	2,646	5.2	−14.8
Green	Emily Lawrence	2,106	4.1	New
Majority		17,813	34.7	+1.9
Turnout		51,304	64.4	−1.9
Conservative hold		Swing		

General election 2010: South West Bedfordshire
Party	Candidate	Votes	%	±%
Conservative	Andrew Selous	26,815	52.8	+4.5
Liberal Democrats	Rod Cantrill	10,166	20.0	+3.2
Labour	Jenny Bone	9,948	19.6	−10.6
UKIP	Martin Newman	2,142	4.2	0.0
BNP	Mark Tolman	1,703	3.4	New
Majority		16,649	32.8	+14.7
Turnout		50,774	66.3	+4.5
Conservative hold		Swing	+0.7	

=== Elections in the 2000s ===
General election 2005: South West Bedfordshire
Party	Candidate	Votes	%	±%
Conservative	Andrew Selous	22,114	48.3	+6.2
Labour	Joyce Still	13,837	30.2	−10.2
Liberal Democrats	Andrew Strange	7,723	16.9	+2.1
UKIP	Tom Wise	1,923	4.2	+1.5
Open-Forum	Kenson Gurney	217	0.5	New
Majority		8,277	18.1	+16.4
Turnout		45,814	61.8	−0.3
Conservative hold		Swing		

General election 2001: South West Bedfordshire
Party	Candidate	Votes	%	±%
Conservative	Andrew Selous	18,477	42.1	+1.4
Labour	Andrew Date	17,701	40.4	−0.1
Liberal Democrats	Martin Pantling	6,473	14.8	+0.5
UKIP	Tom Wise	1,203	2.7	+1.9
Majority		776	1.7	+1.5
Turnout		43,854	62.1	−13.7
Conservative hold		Swing	+0.7	

=== Elections in the 1990s ===
General election 1997: South West Bedfordshire
Party	Candidate	Votes	%	±%
Conservative	David Madel	21,534	40.7	−15.5
Labour	Andrew Date	21,402	40.5	+14.7
Liberal Democrats	Stephen Owen	7,559	14.3	−2.3
Referendum	Rosalind Hill	1,761	3.3	New
UKIP	Tom Wise	446	0.8	New
Natural Law	Alexander Le Carpentier	162	0.3	−0.1
Majority		132	0.2	−32.2
Turnout		52,864	75.8	−6.1
Conservative hold		Swing	−16.1	

General election 1992: Bedfordshire South West
Party	Candidate	Votes	%	±%
Conservative	David Madel	37,498	57.1	−1.1
Labour	Barry Elliott	16,225	24.7	+6.4
Liberal Democrats	Mark Freeman	10,988	16.7	−5.6
Green	Peter Rollings	689	1.0	−0.3
Natural Law	John Gilmour	239	0.4	New
Majority		21,273	32.4	−3.5
Turnout		65,639	81.9	+3.2
Conservative hold		Swing	−3.7	

=== Elections in the 1980s ===
General election 1987: South West Bedfordshire
Party	Candidate	Votes	%	±%
Conservative	David Madel	36,140	58.2	+3.2
SDP	John Burrow	13,835	22.3	−5.5
Labour	Paul Dimoldenberg	11,352	18.3	+1.1
Green	Peter Rollings	822	1.3	New
Majority		22,305	35.9	+8.7
Turnout		62,149	78.7	+3.1
Conservative hold		Swing		

General election 1983: South West Bedfordshire
Party	Candidate	Votes	%	±%
Conservative	David Madel	31,767	55.0	
SDP	Richard Byfield	16,036	27.8	
Labour	William Cochrane	9,899	17.2	
Majority		15,731	27.2	
Turnout		57,702	75.6	
Conservative win (new seat)				

== See also ==
- List of parliamentary constituencies in Bedfordshire
