= 1965 Erith and Crayford by-election =

UK Parliamentary by-election

The 1965 Erith and Crayford by-election of 11 November 1965 was held after the death of Labour MP Norman Dodds.

== Result of the previous general election ==
General election 1964: Erith and Crayford
| Party | Candidate | Votes | % | ±% |
|---|---|---|---|---|
| Labour | Norman Dodds | 22,806 | 53.1 | −3.5 |
| Conservative | B Black | 13,951 | 32.3 | −11.0 |
| Liberal | Stanley W Vince | 6,189 | 14.4 | New |
| Majority | | 8,855 | 20.8 | +7.5 |
| Turnout | | 42,946 | | |
| Labour hold | | Swing | | |

== Result of the by-election ==
The Labour Party held the seat with a reduced majority.

By-election 1965: Erith and Crayford
| Party | Candidate | Votes | % | ±% |
|---|---|---|---|---|
| Labour | James Wellbeloved | 21,835 | 55.4 | +2.3 |
| Conservative | David Madel | 14,763 | 37.5 | +5.2 |
| Liberal | Stanley W Vince | 2,823 | 7.2 | −7.2 |
| Majority | | 7,072 | 17.9 | −2.9 |
| Turnout | | 39,421 | | |
| Labour hold | | Swing | | |
