= South Bedfordshire (constituency) =

Parliamentary constituency in the United Kingdom, 1950–1983

- Former county constituency for the House of Commons
- Boundary of South Bedfordshire in Bedfordshire, boundaries 1974-83

1950–1983
- Seats: One
- Created from: Luton and Mid Bedfordshire
- Replaced by: South West Bedfordshire, Luton North and Luton South

South Bedfordshire was a county constituency in Bedfordshire. It returned one Member of Parliament (MP) to the House of Commons of the Parliament of the United Kingdom, elected by the first past the post system.

The constituency was created for the 1950 general election, and abolished for the 1983 general election.

== Boundaries and boundary changes ==
=== 1950–1974 ===
The constituency was created by the Representation of the People Act 1948 as a County Constituency, comprising:

- The Municipal Borough of Dunstable;
- The Urban District of Leighton Buzzard;
- The Municipal Borough of Luton wards of Leagrave and Limbury; and
- The Rural District of Luton.

Leighton Buzzard and surrounding rural areas were transferred from Mid Bedfordshire; and Dunstable, Leagrave and Limbury from the abolished constituency of Luton.

=== 1974–1983 ===
(Second Periodic Review of Westminster Constituencies)

- The Municipal Borough of Dunstable;
- The Urban District of Leighton-Linslade; and
- The Rural District of Luton.

Gained the former Urban District of Linslade from Buckingham in Buckinghamshire - this had been merged with Leighton Buzzard to form the Urban District of Leighton-Linslade in 1965. Leagrave and Limbury were included in the new constituency of Luton West.

The constituency was abolished for the 1983 general election. It was largely absorbed into the new constituency of South West Bedfordshire, including Dunstable, Leighton Buzzard and Linslade. Areas to the north and south of Luton were included in the constituencies of North Luton and Luton South respectively.

== Members of Parliament ==
Election	Member	Party
1950	Edward Moeran	Labour
1951	Norman Cole	Conservative
1966	Gwilym Roberts	Labour
1970	David Madel	Conservative
1983	constituency abolished	

== Elections ==
=== Elections in the 1950s ===
General election 1950: Bedfordshire South
Party	Candidate	Votes	%	±%
Labour	Edward Moeran	20,070	45.26	
National Liberal	William A Fearnley-Whittingstall	18,546	41.83	
Liberal	James Stewart Knight	5,725	12.91	
Majority		1,524	3.43	
Turnout		44,341	86.88	
Registered electors		51,039		
Labour win (new seat)				

General election 1951: Bedfordshire South
Party	Candidate	Votes	%	±%
National Liberal	Norman Cole	22,917	50.94	+9.11
Labour	Edward Moeran	22,068	49.06	+3.80
Majority		849	1.88	N/A
Turnout		44,985	86.70	−0.18
Registered electors		51,887		
National Liberal gain from Labour		Swing	+2.66	

General election 1955: Bedfordshire South
Party	Candidate	Votes	%	±%
National Liberal	Norman Cole	23,365	52.79	+1.85
Labour	Edward Moeran	20,897	47.21	−1.85
Majority		2,468	5.58	+3.70
Turnout		44,262	81.89	−4.81
Registered electors		54,051		
National Liberal hold		Swing	+1.85	

General election 1959: Bedfordshire South
Party	Candidate	Votes	%	±%
National Liberal	Norman Cole	25,861	47.13	−5.66
Labour	Walter Johnson	21,102	38.45	−8.76
Liberal	Renee Soskin	7,912	14.42	New
Majority		4,759	8.68	+3.10
Turnout		54,875	83.89	+2.00
Registered electors		65,416		
National Liberal hold		Swing	+1.55	

=== Elections in the 1960s ===
General election 1964: Bedfordshire South
Party	Candidate	Votes	%	±%
Conservative	Norman Cole	33,838	50.25	+3.12
Labour	Dennis John Nisbet	33,499	49.75	+11.30
Majority		339	0.50	−8.17
Turnout		67,337	80.83	−3.06
Registered electors		83,307		
Conservative hold		Swing	−4.09	

General election 1966: Bedfordshire South
Party	Candidate	Votes	%	±%
Labour	Gwilym Roberts	34,549	47.75	−2.00
Conservative	Norman Cole	30,319	41.90	−8.35
Liberal	Hamilton Simonds-Gooding	7,484	10.34	New
Majority		4,230	5.85	N/A
Turnout		72,352	83.74	+2.91
Registered electors		86,403		
Labour gain from Conservative		Swing	+3.18	

=== Elections in the 1970s ===
General election 1970: Bedfordshire South
Party	Candidate	Votes	%	±%
Conservative	David Madel	38,085	48.73	+6.83
Labour	Gwilym Roberts	33,107	42.36	−5.39
Liberal	Godfrey Shocket	6,956	8.90	−1.44
Majority		4,978	6.36	N/A
Turnout		78,148	77.16	−6.58
Registered electors		101,284		
Conservative gain from Labour		Swing	+6.11	

General election February 1974: Bedfordshire South
Party	Candidate	Votes	%	±%
Conservative	David Madel	21,380	39.70	−9.03
Liberal	David John Howard Penwarden	16,622	30.87	+21.97
Labour	Paul Farnham Tinnion	15,847	29.43	−12.93
Majority		4,758	8.83	+2.47
Turnout		53,849	84.49	+7.33
Registered electors		63,700		
Conservative hold		Swing	−15.50	

General election October 1974: Bedfordshire South
Party	Candidate	Votes	%	±%
Conservative	David Madel	20,794	41.31	+1.61
Labour	Raymond Alfred Little	16,351	32.48	+3.05
Liberal	David John Howard Penwarden	13,194	26.21	−4.66
Majority		4,443	8.83	0.00
Turnout		50,339	78.27	−6.27
Registered electors		64,329		
Conservative hold		Swing	−0.72	

General election 1979: Bedfordshire South
Party	Candidate	Votes	%	±%
Conservative	David Madel	32,988	56.37	+15.06
Labour	John Gardner	16,505	28.20	−4.28
Liberal	Malcolm Alfred Turner	8,402	14.36	−11.85
National Front	Laurence Anthony Smith	626	1.07	New
Majority		16,483	28.17	+19.34
Turnout		58,521	79.90	+1.65
Registered electors		73,247		
Conservative hold		Swing	+9.67	
