= Nigel Beard =

British politician (1936–2017)

- Beard as an MP

Member of Parliament for Bexleyheath and Crayford
- In office 1 May 1997 – 11 April 2005
- Preceded by: Constituency established
- Succeeded by: David Evennett

Personal details
- Born: Christopher Nigel Beard; 10 October 1936 Leeds, England
- Died: 31 July 2017 (aged 80) Surrey, England
- Party: Labour

Christopher Nigel Beard (10 October 1936 – 31 July 2017) was a British Labour politician who served as Member of Parliament (MP) for Bexleyheath and Crayford in London from 1997 to 2005.

Beard was born in Leeds and raised in Castleford, West Riding of Yorkshire, the son of Albert and Irene Beard. He was educated at Castleford Grammar School and University College London, where he was awarded a BSc in Special Physics. After brief employment as a schoolmaster, physicist and market researcher, Beard worked as a scientific officer at the Ministry of Defence, as a director of the London Docklands Development Team, as a senior consultant at ICI, and finally as a senior manager at Zeneca Group plc.

He previously contested several parliamentary constituencies in the Labour interest: Woking at the 1979 general election, Portsmouth North at the 1983 general election and Erith and Crayford at the 1992 general election. At the 1997 general election, he was returned as MP for Bexleyheath and Crayford. He retained the seat at the 2001 election but lost it in the 2005 election to David Evennett of the Conservative Party.

Beard was a loyal follower of the Labour whip, voting for the Iraq War and other government policies. He also introduced a private member's bill to fix British Summer Time as standard time all year round. He died at the age of 80 in Surrey after a long illness.

Parliament of the United Kingdom
New constituency	Member of Parliament for Bexleyheath and Crayford; 1997–2005	Succeeded by David Evennett
