= Lancashire West (European Parliament constituency) =

Former European Parliament constituency

- European Parliament constituency
- Boundary within North West England (1979-1984)
- Member state: United Kingdom
- Created: 1979
- Dissolved: 1984
- MEPs: 1

Prior to its uniform adoption of proportional representation in 1999, the United Kingdom used first-past-the-post for the European elections in England, Scotland and Wales. The European Parliament constituencies used under that system were smaller than the later regional constituencies and only had one Member of the European Parliament each.

The constituency of Lancashire West was one of them.

When it was created in England in 1979, it consisted of the Westminster Parliament constituencies of Crosby, Huyton, Ince, Ormskirk, St Helens, Southport, Widnes.

== Member of the European Parliament ==
| Elected | Member | Party |
|---|---|---|
| 1979 | Peter Price | Conservative |
| 1984 | Constituency abolished | |

== Results ==
European Parliament election, 1979: Lancashire West
| Party | Candidate | Votes | % | ±% |
|---|---|---|---|---|
| Conservative | Peter Price | 79,888 | 51.3 | |
| Labour | B.S. Jeuda | 60,399 | 38.7 | |
| Liberal | John K. Gibb | 12,116 | 7.8 | |
| Independent | B. Farrel | 3,486 | 2.2 | |
| Majority | | 19,489 | 12.6 | |
| Turnout | | 155,889 | 28.0 | |
| Conservative win (new seat) | | | | |
