= R v Fellows; R v Arnold =

R v. Fellows; R v. Arnold [1997] 1 Cr App R 244; [1997] 2 All E.R. 548, is a prominent English case on the statutory interpretation of section 1 of the Protection of Children Act 1978, and the Obscene Publications Act 1959, the definitions have since been amended by the Criminal Justice and Public Order Act 1994. The Court of Appeal held that data on a computer that represents the original photograph is a copy of a photograph under the 1978 Act, therefore, downloading an indecent photograph from the internet constitutes making a copy or reproduction of an indecent photograph.

== Facts ==
The first appellant, Alban Fellows, had stored digital images on his employer's computer that enabled users to both display and print indecent pictures of children. These materials could also be accessed on the Internet, allowing others to view and duplicate these images. The extensive digital library, viewable on the Internet, encompassed numerous explicit images of children and was called The Archive. Only the users who were given a password by Fellows, could access the archive. Fellows selected to whom a password was given on the basis of recommendations given by other users. Those people who provided similar data uploads to increase the archive were also rewarded with a password. The second appellant, Steven Arnold, was one such user who assisted in the overall growth of the archive.

At trial, Fellows was convicted on four offences of possessing indecent photographs of children that could be displayed or distributed to others, contrary to 1 (1)(c) under the Children’s Act of 1978, which prohibits possessing such indecent photographs with the intention to have them distributed or shown. This was also in defiance of the Obscene Publications Act of 1959.

Arnold was convicted with three offences of distributing and showing indecent photographs of children, contrary to 1 (1)(b), which prohibits distributing or showing such indecent photographs. The appellants appealed to the Court of Appeal. They also appealed against their convictions.

== Issues ==
1. Whether the computer data in the archive was considered a photograph under section 1 of the 1978 Act.
2. If it was not considered a photograph, is the computer disk a copy?
3. Did the 1978 Act and 1959 Act, before they were amended in 1994, have a wider scope?
4. Whether the computer data that was in Fellows possession was distributed, or shown, by being made available for downloading to other computer users.

== Judgment ==
1. The Court of Appeal judge accepted the trial judge's findings that the computer data within the archive was considered a photograph for the purposes of section 1 of the 1978 Act. It was accepted that when the Act was passed such a technology was not accommodated for by Parliament, even so, it was still implied in the Act's scope. Evans LJ, pointed out that a photograph, both in 1978 and now, is “a picture or image which a person sees”, whether a print or with the assistance of technology. The Court held that a photograph in this instance was used according to the 1978 Act, and s 7 (4) extended this meaning. The argument was dismissed.
2. Even though the computer disc is not itself a photograph, the court held that there is nothing in the Act which makes it implicit that the copy must be an actual physical photograph. The disc represented the original photograph, albeit in a different form. The argument was dismissed.
3. The Court of Appeal struggled with the issue of statutory interpretation, specifically, whether the 1978 and 1959 Act, before amended in 1994, had a wider scope. The Court held that when the statute was created it was written for what was known at the time to Parliament, advancement in technology cannot be viewed as a restriction on the scope of the definition. The definition was constructed to allow for future technological developments. The argument was dismissed.
4. The Court pointed out that the computer data that Fellows possessed was in fact distributed or shown. Evans LJ, stated that Fellows “ not only stored the data on his computer but also made it available worldwide to other computers via the internet. He corresponded by email with those who sought to have access to it, and he imposed certain conditions before they were admitted to do so. He gave them permission by giving them a password. He did this with the sole purpose of allowing others as well as himself, to view exact reproductions of the photographs stored in his archive.” The Court held that the computer users downloaded the same visual reproduction that is in Fellows possession. The arguments were dismissed.

Both Fellows and Arnold were convicted of showing and distributing pornographic materials.

Their appeal was dismissed and their sentences remained. Fellows was sentenced to three years in prison and Arnold was sentenced to six months in prison.

== Significance ==
This case is regarded as a landmark case concerning the distribution of pornographic materials. It is also the first case of its kind that pre-dated the amendments by the 1994 Criminal Justice and Public Order Act. Another implication this trial had was that the Children’s Act of 1978 has been amended by section 84 of the Criminal Justice and Public Order Act 1994, such that the definition of a photograph has been expanded. The current definition now includes data stored on a computer disc, or by other electronic means, which is then capable of being converted into a photograph (section 84 (3) (b)). The amended Act also introduced the idea of a “pseudo-photograph”, which describes an image created by computer graphic software that can closely resemble a photograph (section 84 (3) (c)). The case also illustrates that technology develops and progresses faster than the law can keep up with it. The Court addressed this concern in the third aforementioned issue, by pointing out the possibility that when statutes are written by Parliament it is only based on what is currently known at that time. It does not necessarily mean that the statute is automatically outdated because of the coming of a new technology. The statute likely implies that it accommodates for new developments in technology. This is likely because most cybercrimes are elaborations of traditional crimes, they are just merely labelled differently. This case also displays the wide scope of digital evidence and its application to traditional criminal offences.
