= Shaun Spiers =

British politician (born 1962)

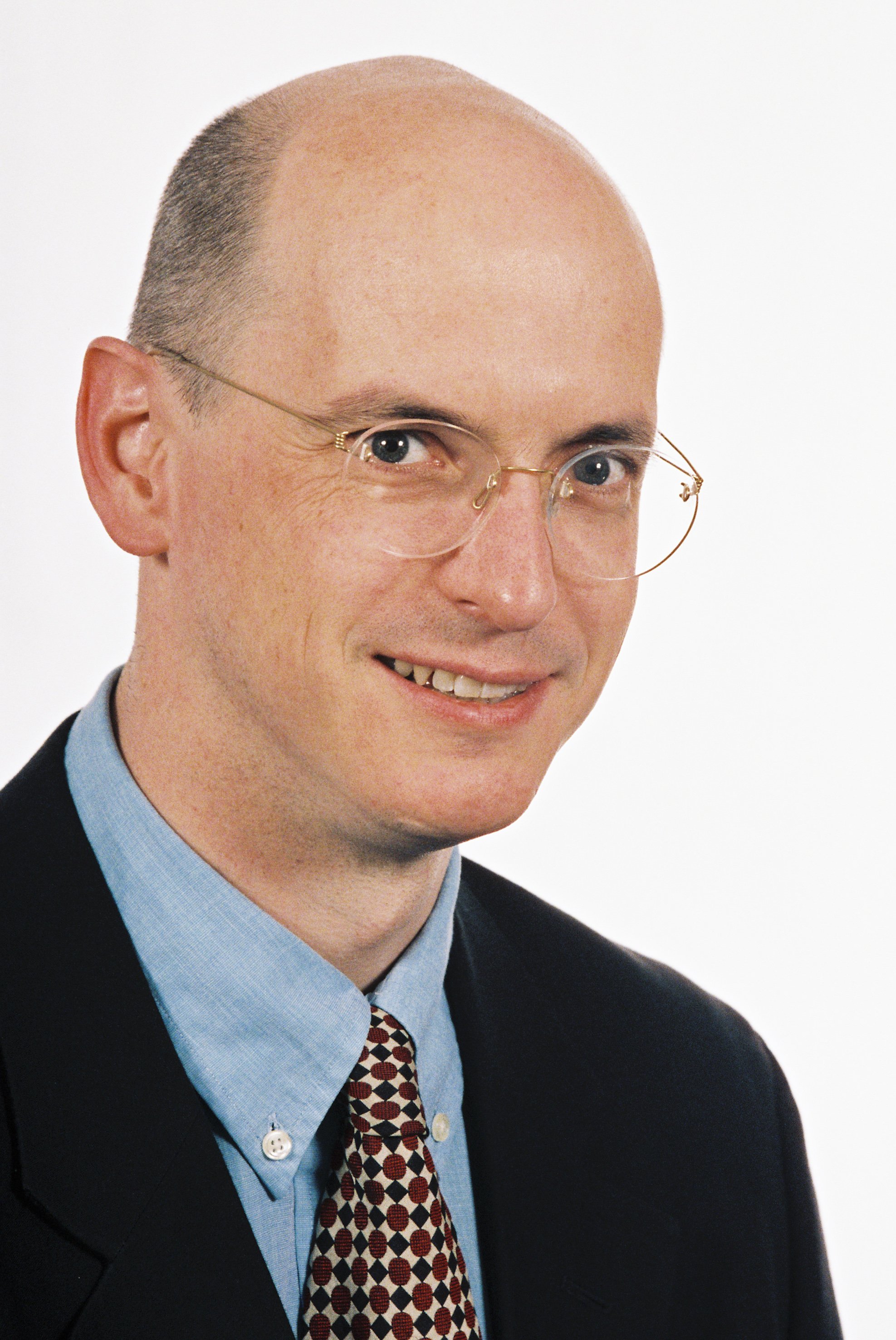
- Official MEP portrait

Member of the European Parliament for London South East
- In office 9 June 1994 – 10 June 1999
- Preceded by: Peter Price
- Succeeded by: Constituency Dissolved

Personal details
- Born: 23 April 1962 (age 64)
- Party: Labour
- Education: St John's College, Oxford; King's College London

Shaun Mark Spiers (born 23 April 1962) is the Executive Director of the environmental think-tank, Green Alliance and a former Member of the European Parliament.

== Biography ==
He was educated at Brentwood School, read PPE at St John's College, Oxford and later took a master's degree in War Studies from King's College London writing Tom Wintringham and the Socialist Way of War for the Institute of Historical Research in 1988, a paper which led to Wintringham's papers coming to King's, and formed the basis for much of Wintringham's biography as eventually written by Hugh Purcell. A keen cooperator, he served as Political Officer of the South East Co-op (Co-operative Wholesale Society) from 1987 to 1994. In 1994 he was elected Labour MEP for London South East. He served on the Agriculture and Rural Development committee. He was not re-elected in 1999 under the list system, and became Chief Executive of the Association of British Credit Unions Limited (ABCUL) which represents the vast majority of credit unions in Great Britain. Spiers was Chief Executive of CPRE 2004 to 2017.

His book, 'How to build houses and save the countryside', was published by Policy Press in March 2018.
