= Gwilym Roberts =

British politician (1928–2018)

Member of Parliament for Cannock
- In office 28 February 1974 – 13 May 1983
- Preceded by: Patrick Cormack
- Succeeded by: Constituency abolished

Member of Parliament for South Bedfordshire
- In office 31 March 1966 – 29 May 1970
- Preceded by: Norman Cole
- Succeeded by: David Madel

Personal details
- Born: Gwilym Edffrwd Roberts; 7 August 1928
- Died: 15 March 2018 (aged 89)
- Party: Labour
- Spouse: Mair Griffiths (m. 1954)
- Education: Brynrefail Grammar School
- Alma mater: University of Wales

Gwilym Edffrwd Roberts (7 August 1928 – 15 March 2018) was a British Labour Party politician, who was Member of Parliament for South Bedfordshire from 1966 to 1970, and for Cannock from February 1974 to 1983.

== Early life ==
Roberts was educated at Brynrefail Grammar School and the University of Wales. He was a lecturer in scientific management techniques and served as a councillor on Luton Borough Council from 1965. He married Mair Griffiths in 1954.

== Parliamentary career ==
Roberts contested Ormskirk in 1959 and Conway in 1964. He was Member of Parliament for South Bedfordshire from 1966 to 1970, and for Cannock from February 1974 to 1983. Boundary changes that year changed his seat to Cannock and Burntwood, but he lost it in Labour's landslide defeat to the Conservative Gerald Howarth. He stood again in that constituency in 1987, but Howarth increased his majority.

== After Parliament ==
Following his Westminster defeat he resumed his career in local government, serving as leader of Cannock Chase District Council, where he represented the Rugeley ward of Brereton and Ravenhill until losing his seat in 2002. He served as a Labour councillor on Staffordshire County Council, representing the Brereton and Ravenhill division, which incorporates a slightly larger area than the district council ward of the same name. He retired from membership of the County Council in 2010.

He continued to live in Rugeley with his wife until his death in 2018.

== Sources ==
- Times Guide to the House of Commons, 1966 & 1983
- Leigh Rayment's Historical List of MPs

Parliament of the United Kingdom
| Preceded by Norman Cole | Member of Parliament for South Bedfordshire; 1966–1970 | Succeeded by David Madel |
| Preceded by Patrick Cormack | Member of Parliament for Cannock; 1974–1983 | Constituency abolished (see Cannock & Burntwood) |
