= Norman Cole (politician) =

British politician

Member of Parliament for South Bedfordshire
- In office 1951-1966

Personal details
- Born: 1 June 1909
- Died: 22 January 1979 (aged 69)
- Party: Conservative; National Liberal

Norman John Cole (1 June 1909 – 22 January 1979) was a British Conservative and National Liberal Member of Parliament. He represented South Bedfordshire from 1951 to 1966, when the seat was taken by Labour candidate Gwilym Roberts.

== Political career ==
During his time as an MP Cole introduced a private members bill which eventually culminated in the Child and Young Persons (Amendment) Act 1952.

Parliament of the United Kingdom
Preceded by Edward Moeran	Member of Parliament for South Bedfordshire; 1951–1966	Succeeded by Gwilym Roberts
