= Norman Dodds =

British politician (1903–65)

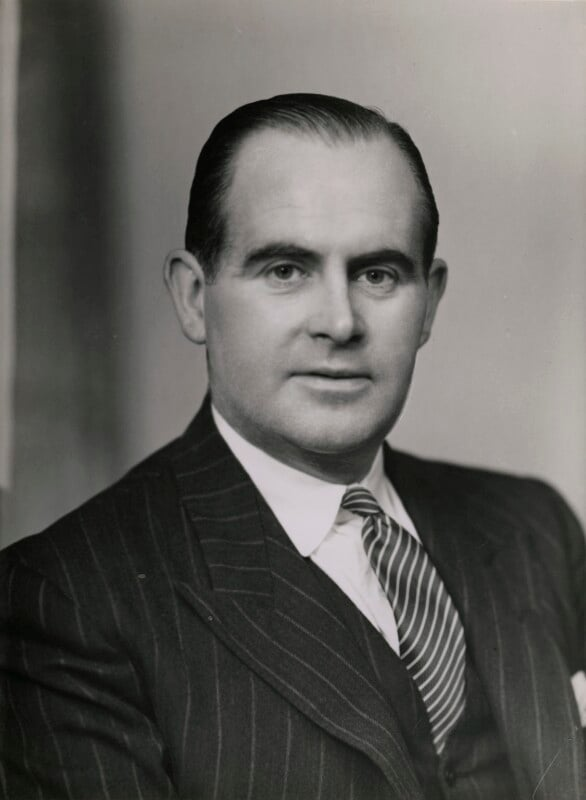
- Dodds in 1949

Member of Parliament for Erith and Crayford Dartford (1945–55)
- In office 26 July 1945 – 22 August 1965
- Preceded by: Constituency redrawn
- Succeeded by: James Wellbeloved

Personal details
- Born: Norman Noel Dodds; 25 December 1903 Dunston, Tyne and Wear, UK
- Died: 22 August 1965 (aged 61)
- Party: Labour Co-operative
- Spouse: Eva Dodds
- Parent: Ambrose Dodds (father)

Norman Noel Dodds (25 December 1903 – 22 August 1965) was a British co-operator and Labour Co-operative politician.

The Labour Party campaign centre and headquarters building in Northumberland Heath is named "Norman Dodds House" in honour of the former MP. He was Member of Parliament from 1945 until his death in 1965, and is best remembered for having been Margaret Thatcher's successful opponent when she first stood for Parliament, in the 1950 and 1951 general elections.

He was well known as an advocate for Gypsy rights.

== Early life ==
Dodds was born in Dunston-on-Tyne, near to Gateshead, the son of Ambrose Dodds. He attended Dunston-on-Tyne Council School, an elementary school, as his only education. From 1918 he was employed by the Co-operative Wholesale Society in Newcastle upon Tyne, and in 1925 Dodds joined the Labour Party. He moved to London in 1929, where he was employed by the Co-operative Wholesale Society as manager of the London branch of the CWS publicity department. Dodds joined the Union of Shop, Distributive and Allied Workers and the National Co-operative Managers Association. His main occupation was organising trade exhibitions for the CWS around England.

In 1931 Dodds married Eva Pratt, from Catford, who also became involved in the Co-operative movement. Eva Dodds later became the second woman to join the CWS board. Norman and Eva Dodds had two sons together. During the Second World War, Dodds joined the Home Guard where he had commissioned rank and served in the East End of London during The Blitz. In 1942 he joined the Royal Air Force in which he served until 1945. In 1945 he became a Director of the People's Entertainment Society.

== Election to Parliament ==
As the war came to an end, the Government invited the Boundary Commission to divide the abnormally large constituencies; one of them was the Dartford division of Kent, which had a 1939 electorate of 134,935. The Commission recommended that two new boroughs, Bexley and Dartford be created out of the division. The sitting MP for Dartford was Jennie Adamson, who had won a by-election for Labour in 1938; she decided to fight in the new Bexley constituency. Dodds, who was living in Dartford, was selected as Labour candidate for the new Dartford borough constituency.

When the election came he had a straight fight with the Conservative Party candidate, Captain Ralph Grubb, who had served on the staff of Field-Marshal Montgomery. Dodds had a well-funded campaign, outspending his opponent by £1,071 to £954, and won the seat with a majority of 19,714.

== Parliament ==
Dodds made his maiden speech on 26 October 1945, reporting on a recent visit he had made to occupied Berlin. He said that the children in Berlin were living in refugee camps and were starving, and urged the Government to provide more food for them. A year later, he was one of the three MPs to visit Greece as a delegation organised by the League for Democracy in Greece, a pressure group based in London. Apart from Dodds, the MPs Leslie Solley and Stanley Tiffany were also members of the delegation. The delegation received the invitation to Greece from General Othoneos, who was then the president of the Greek Union of Democratic Associations, to come as guests of his organisation. The Foreign Office did not sponsor the delegates' visas on the grounds that their visit was private and not official, but the Greek Embassy in London authorised the visas nonetheless. The delegates split up into pairs, with Dodds and the delegation's secretary Diana Pym going to Northern Greece, speaking at the 1946 May Day demonstration in Thessaloniki, and visiting the Women's Prison and surrounding villages.

On their return, the delegates wrote a pamphlet called Tragedy in Greece relaying their experiences in the country and their worries about Greece's political future. Tragedy in Greece was circulated with over 40,000 copies sold in the years after it was published. Shortly after his return from Greece, Dodds' views on Greece were vigorously criticised in Parliament by Foreign Office Minister Hector McNeil; Dodds, complaining that he had not been able to speak in the debate and had not been told he was to be mentioned, later spoke in detail about his views on Greece in an adjournment debate on 29 October 1946. McNeil gave a partial apology but maintained his view of the delegation.

While usually loyal to the Labour Party whip, Dodds broke it on two occasions during the Parliament. The first was in May 1946 when he joined 31 other Labour MPs in voting to delete a clause in the National Insurance Bill which limited unemployment benefit to 180 days; the second was in May 1947 when he supported an amendment to end National Service on 1 January 1951, along with 29 other Labour MPs.

== 1950 election ==
In February 1949, Dartford Conservative Association selected Margaret Roberts, then a 23-year-old research chemist at BX Plastics of Manningtree, as their candidate for the forthcoming general election. Dodds engaged in a prolonged exchange of letters through the columns of the Dartford Chronicle through the autumn of 1949 over the government's Control of Engagement Order 1947, which allowed the government to specify jobs for the unemployed in which they were required to work. Dodds pointed to the relatively small number of people who were directed, and invited Roberts to a public meeting at which he would tell her what had happened on Tyneside and Wearside between the wars (she declined due to prior engagements). They also clashed on family allowances.

At the end of November 1949, Dodds and Roberts met in a public debate in which he concluded by pointing to rising employment figures and suggesting that Roberts would soon join the Labour Party: "May I ask her a favour? When she wants to join, will she let me have the pleasure of enrolling her?" When the election was called for 23 February 1950, Dodds campaigned strongly, even using a helicopter to advertise, and played on his local standing, as he was President of Dartford Football Club. He again outspent his opponents, both Roberts and Liberal candidate Harry Giles, winning re-election with a reduced majority of 13,638. Afterwards, he paid tribute to the clean fight in the constituency. A few weeks later Dodds invited Roberts to lunch at the House of Commons.

== First question ==
Dodds had the distinction of submitting the first question in the new Parliament; he asked the Prime Minister to call a conference to find ways of outlawing the hydrogen bomb and atomic weapons. Dodds was appointed a member of the Central Advisory Committee to the Minister of Pensions, and in May 1951 was appointed Parliamentary Private Secretary to Alfred Robens, the Minister of Labour. As the Government had a small majority, MPs were pressed to attend at all times; on 19 March 1951 Dodds attracted some attention when he came to Parliament with pyjamas, a pillow and a car rug, allowing him to catch some sleep during all-night sittings.

== 1951 election ==
Speaking at a summer fete in his constituency on 18 August 1951, Dodds disclosed that the Cabinet was split on the issue of whether to hold a general election that October or whether to wait until June 1952. He stated his prediction that the election would in fact be held on 25 October 1951.

The fact that Ministers were divided about when to call an election was an open secret but Dodds' speech allowed it to be reported and his prediction was taken seriously. His prediction proved accurate. Dodds had a straight fight in Dartford against Margaret Roberts who was readopted as the Conservative Party candidate. She succeeded in reducing his majority by 1,304 to 12,334; in his victory speech Dodds congratulated Roberts on her engagement to Denis Thatcher and wished them good fortune. For her part Roberts said that she and Dodds had been good friends as political opponents. Writing in 1995, Margaret Thatcher described Dodds as "a genuine and extremely chivalrous socialist of the old school" whom she was lucky to have as an opponent.

Some eight years later, Roberts, now Margaret Thatcher, joined him in the House of Commons as the member for Finchley in 1959.

He was Member of Parliament for Dartford from 1945 to 1955, and then for Erith and Crayford from 1955 until his death in 1965, aged 61.

Parliament of the United Kingdom
Preceded by Jennie Adamson	Member of Parliament for Dartford; 1945 – 1955	Succeeded by Sydney Irving
New constituency	Member of Parliament for Erith and Crayford; 1955 – 1965	Succeeded by James Wellbeloved
