= Andrew Selous =

British politician

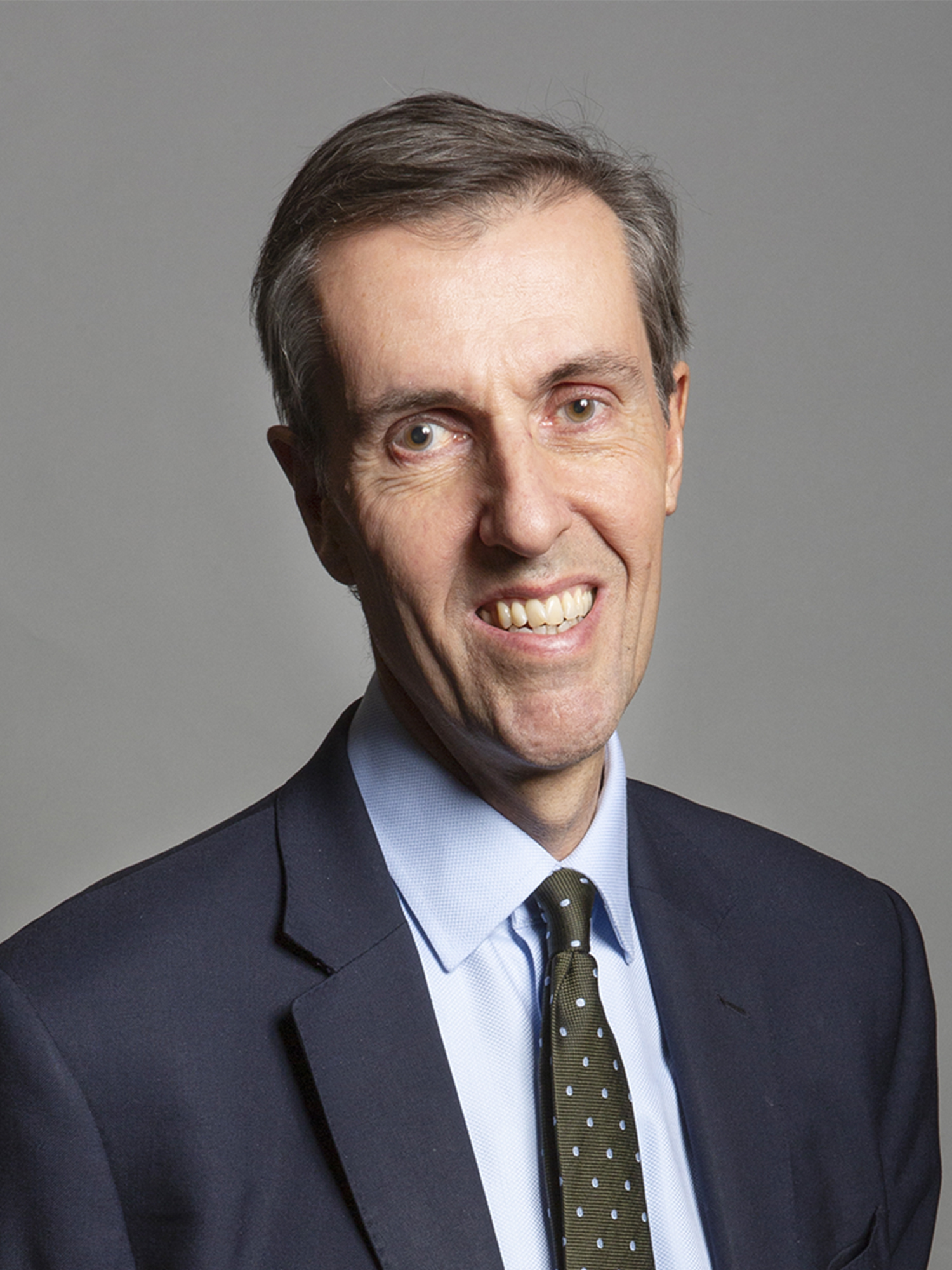
- Official portrait, 2019

Second Church Estates Commissioner
- In office 10 January 2020 – 5 July 2024
- Prime Minister: Boris Johnson; Liz Truss; Rishi Sunak
- Preceded by: Dame Caroline Spelman
- Succeeded by: Marsha de Cordova

Parliamentary Under-Secretary of State for Justice
- In office 15 July 2014 – 17 July 2016
- Prime Minister: David Cameron
- Preceded by: Jeremy Wright
- Succeeded by: Sam Gyimah

Member of Parliament for South West Bedfordshire
- In office 7 June 2001 – 30 May 2024
- Preceded by: David Madel
- Succeeded by: Constituency abolished

Personal details
- Born: 27 April 1962 (age 64) Marylebone, London, England
- Party: Conservative
- Spouse: Harriet Marston
- Children: 3
- Education: Eton College
- Alma mater: London School of Economics
- Occupation: MP
- Profession: Business, Industry, Trade
- Website: andrewselous.org.uk
- Military career
- Allegiance: United Kingdom
- Branch: British Army
- Service years: 1981-1996
- Rank: Lieutenant
- Service number: 533612
- Units: Honourable Artillery Company; Royal Regiment of Fusiliers

Andrew Edmund Armstrong Selous (/səˈluː/; born 27 April 1962) is a British politician who served as the Member of Parliament (MP) for South West Bedfordshire from 2001 until 2024, when the constituency was abolished. Selous stood for the new Dunstable and Leighton Buzzard constituency however the seat was won by the Labour candidate Alex Mayer. Selous lives in Studham in the constituency of Luton South.

A member of the Conservative Party, he served as Minister of State for Prisons from 2014 to 2016 in the government of Prime Minister David Cameron.

== Early life ==
Selous was born in Marylebone to Gerald and Mary Selous (née Casey). He was privately educated both at West Downs School and Eton College. He then studied at the London School of Economics, receiving a BSc in Industry and Trade in 1984.

In 1981, Selous joined the Honourable Artillery Company as a soldier. On 1 October 1989, he was commissioned in the Queen's Division, Territorial Army, as a second lieutenant (on probation); he then served with the Royal Regiment of Fusiliers. He was promoted to lieutenant on 1 October 1991. He was transferred to the London Regiment on 20 April 1993. He moved to the Regular Army Reserve of Officers in January 1996, thereby ending his active service.

From 1988 until 1994, he was a director of his family firm CNS Electronics (now CNS Farnell). Then, from 1991 until 2001, he was an underwriter at Great Lakes Reinsurance (UK) PLC.

== Parliamentary career ==
Selous was first elected to the House of Commons in 2001, and had previously contested the Sunderland North seat in 1997. He is a director and prominent member of the Conservative Christian Fellowship.

In 2006, Selous was promoted to Shadow Minister for Work and Pensions.

In the Coalition government, he was the Parliamentary Private Secretary to Iain Duncan Smith, Secretary of State for Work and Pensions, from 28 May 2010 to 16 July 2014. On 16 July 2014, he was appointed as Parliamentary Under Secretary of State in the Ministry of Justice with responsibility for Prisons and Probation and retained this role following the 2015 general election. However he was asked to step down from the government by Theresa May after she became Prime Minister in July 2016.

He attracted criticism in 2014 for reportedly stating at a Centre for Social Justice fringe meeting that "disabled people work harder because they're grateful to have a job". Selous subsequently said that he had simply been trying to convey the message that disabled people were valued by employers, and his observation that disabled people often work harder was supported by a spokesperson for Disability Rights UK.

Selous chairs the All Party Parliamentary Group on Strengthening Couple Relationships, and argues that cross-party efforts to prevent family breakdown can relieve pressure on the care system. He was opposed to the Marriage (Same Sex Couples) Act 2013, arguing that it was directly contrary to what Jesus said.

He served as Second Church Estates Commissioner, responsible for representing the Church Commissioners in Parliament and in the General Synod of the Church of England, from 2020 to 2024.

== Post-parliamentary career ==
Following his defeat at the 2024 UK General Election, Selous has worked as an Executive Director at City & Commercial Insurance Group.

Parliament of the United Kingdom
Preceded by David Madel	Member of Parliament for South West Bedfordshire; 2001–2024	Constituency abolished
