= David Evennett =

British Conservative politician (1949–2026)

The Right Honourable Sir David Evennett
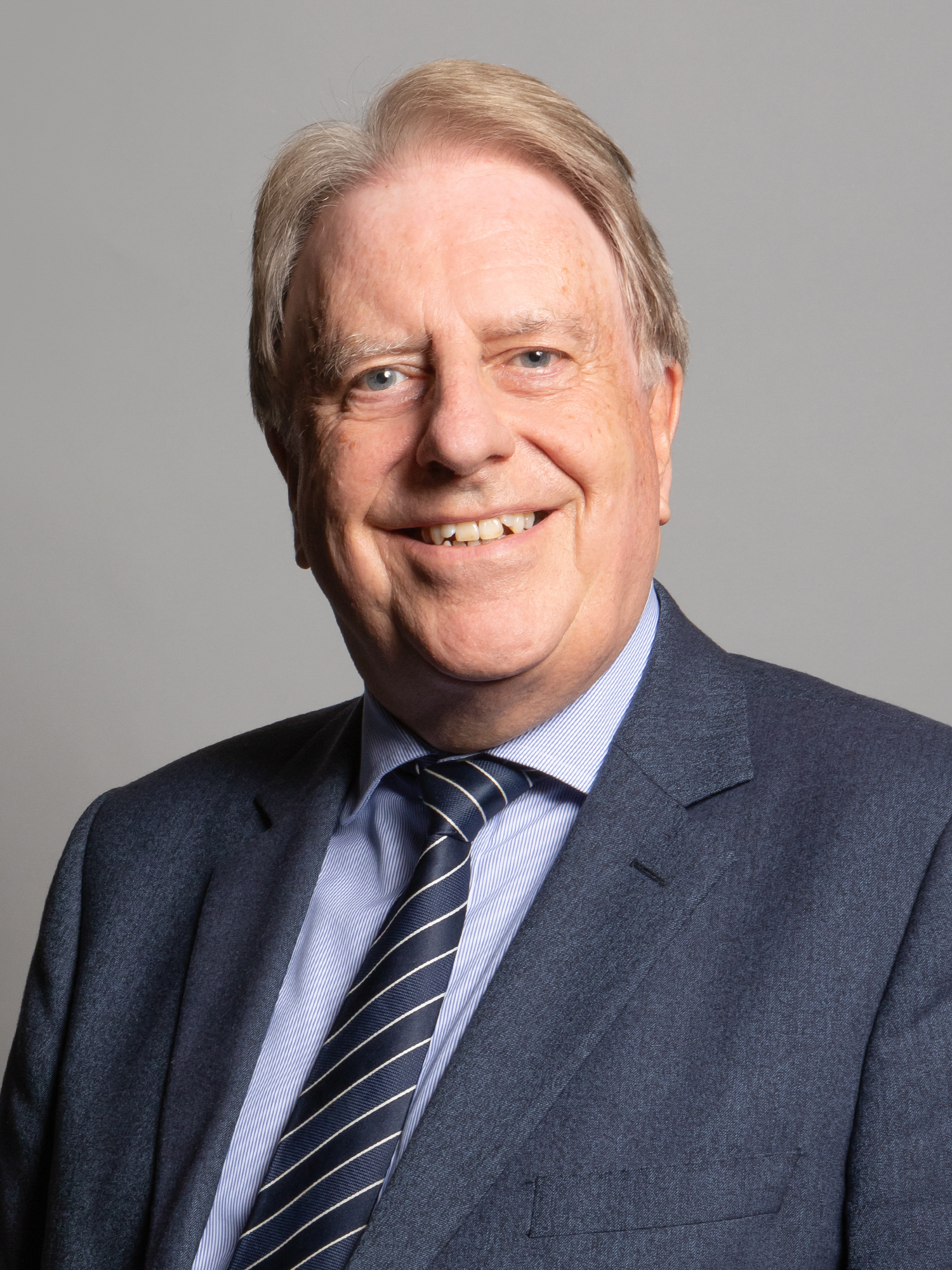
- Official portrait, 2019

Lord Commissioner of the Treasury
- In office 8 September 2022 – 27 October 2022
- Prime Minister: Liz Truss
- In office 4 September 2012 – 9 January 2018
- Prime Minister: David Cameron; Theresa May
- Preceded by: Brooks Newmark
- Succeeded by: Andrew Stephenson

Assistant Government Whip
- In office 8 July 2022 – 7 September 2022
- Prime Minister: Boris Johnson

Vice Chairman of the Conservative Party for Business Engagement
- In office 5 August 2019 – 7 September 2022
- Leader: Boris Johnson
- Preceded by: Paul Scully
- Succeeded by: Saqib Bhatti

Member of Parliament for Bexleyheath and Crayford
- In office 5 May 2005 – 30 May 2024
- Preceded by: Nigel Beard
- Succeeded by: Daniel Francis

Member of Parliament for Erith and Crayford
- In office 9 June 1983 – 8 April 1997
- Preceded by: James Wellbeloved
- Succeeded by: Constituency abolished

Personal details
- Born: David Anthony Evennett; 3 June 1949 Romford, Essex, England
- Died: 16 November 2026 (aged 77)
- Party: Conservative
- Spouse: Marilyn Smith (m. 1975)
- Children: 2
- Education: London School of Economics
- Occupation: Politician

Sir David Anthony Evennett (3 June 1949 – 16 November 2026) was a British Conservative politician. He served as the Member of Parliament (MP) for Bexleyheath and Crayford from 2005 to 2024 and for Erith and Crayford from 1983 to 1997. He served as Lord Commissioner of the Treasury from 2012 to 2018, and briefly during 2022.

Evennett held several education related offices during his parliamentary career. He was a member of the Education, Science and Arts Committee from 1986 to 1992 and later member of the Education & Skills Select Committee from 2005 to 2006. Outside of committee, he was a PPS to the Minister of State at the Department for Education from 1992 to 1993, the Shadow Minister for Skills from 2009 to 2010, and PPS to the Education Secretary from 2010 to 2012.

He did not run for re-election in 2024 and retired, with a total of 33 years in Parliament. Evennett published a personal and political memoir titled The Road to Crayford in 2024.

== Early life ==
Evennett was educated at Buckhurst Hill County High School and the London School of Economics, where he was awarded an MSc in Economics. He began his career as a teacher at Ilford County High School between 1972 and 1974, from which post he resigned when he was elected to represent the Woodford ward on Redbridge London Borough Council (1974–78). From 1974 to 1981 he was also a marine insurance broker at Lloyd's, and he worked as a lecturer in management between 1997 and 2005.

At the 1979 general election he contested the Labour seat of Hackney South and Shoreditch where he came second to Ronald Brown.

== Parliamentary career ==
=== Erith and Crayford ===
Evennett was elected as the Conservative MP for Erith and Crayford at the 1983 general election, when he defeated James Wellbeloved who had defected from the Labour Party to the newly formed Social Democrats in 1981. Evennett gained the seat with a majority of 920 votes over Wellbeloved. He remained the MP until the seat was redrawn in boundary changes at the 1997 general election.

In Parliament he joined the Education and Science Select committee in 1986. Following the 1992 general election he was appointed the parliamentary private secretary (PPS) to the Minister of State at the Department for Education, Emily Blatch.

In 1993, he became the PPS to John Redwood, the Secretary of State for Wales, until 1995 when he was made PPS to the Home Office minister David Maclean, and then PPS to Gillian Shephard at the Department for Education in 1996, where he remained until he was defeated at the 1997 general election.

=== Bexleyheath and Crayford ===
Evennett contested the newly drawn Bexleyheath and Crayford seat in 1997, but lost to Labour's Nigel Beard by 3,415 votes. He narrowly lost to Beard again at the 2001 general election but reduced his majority to 1,475. He was re-elected to Parliament for Bexleyheath and Crayford at the 2005 general election, ousting Beard by 4,551 votes. By winning back a seat which, albeit after boundary changes, he had lost in 1997, he became the only MP to have lost his seat in the Labour landslide of 1997, fought the same seat unsuccessfully in 2001 and then to have fought and won it back at the second attempt.

Following his re-election in 2005, he was made a member of the Education & Skills Select Committee and was appointed as an Opposition Whip by Michael Howard, and remained a whip under the new leadership of David Cameron. In January 2009, he was appointed Shadow Minister for Skills in the Conservative Innovation, Universities and Skills team.

At the 2010 general election he was returned with a majority of 10,344, and was appointed PPS to Michael Gove, Secretary of State for Education. In 2012, he was appointed Lord Commissioner of HM Treasury (Government Whip) and remained in the role until January 2018.

In March 2015, he was appointed to the Privy Council and therefore granted the title The Right Honourable.

From January 2016 to July 2016, he was the Acting Parliamentary Under-Secretary of State for Sport, Tourism and Heritage, to cover the maternity leave of Tracey Crouch.

On 18 May 2018, it was announced that David Evennett would be knighted.

In July 2019, the Prime Minister Boris Johnson appointed Evennett as a Vice Chairman of the Conservative Party. On 6 June 2022, after a vote of no confidence in the leadership of Boris Johnson was called, Evennett announced that he would be supporting the Prime Minister. During the premiership of Liz Truss, he returned to his former role as Lord Commissioner of HM Treasury (Government Whip).

On 24 May 2024, Evennett announced that he did not plan to stand for re-election in the 2024 general election.

== Personal life and death ==
Evennett married Marilyn Smith in 1975 in Redbridge; the couple had two sons and two grandchildren.

Evennett died on 16 November 2026, aged 77.

Parliament of the United Kingdom
Preceded by James Wellbeloved	Member of Parliament for Erith and Crayford; 1983–1997	Constituency abolished
Preceded by Nigel Beard	Member of Parliament for Bexleyheath and Crayford; 2005–2024	Succeeded by Daniel Francis
