= Edward Moeran =

British politician (1903–1997)

Member of Parliament for South Bedfordshire
- In office 1950-1951

Personal details
- Born: 27 November 1903
- Died: 12 December 1997 (aged 94)
- Party: Labour Party (after 1950); Common Wealth Party (before 1950)

Edward Warner Moeran (27 November 1903 – 12 December 1997) was a British Common Wealth Party politician who later joined the later Labour Party. He stood as a Parliamentary candidate on five occasions, but won only once.

== Biography ==
Moeran first stood for Parliament as the Common Wealth candidate at the Newark by-election in July 1943, when he came a distant third. At the 1945 general election he stood in Thirsk and Malton, again as a Common Wealth candidate. Labour did not contest the seat, and in a two-way contest with the Conservative party candidate, Moeran won 39.9% of the votes.

He subsequently joined the Labour Party, and was elected at the 1950 general election as Member of Parliament (MP) for South Bedfordshire, but was narrowly defeated at the next election, in 1951. He stood again in 1955, but did not regain the seat.

Parliament of the United Kingdom
New constituency	Member of Parliament for South Bedfordshire; 1950 – 1951	Succeeded by Norman Cole
