= Peter Price (politician) =

British politician

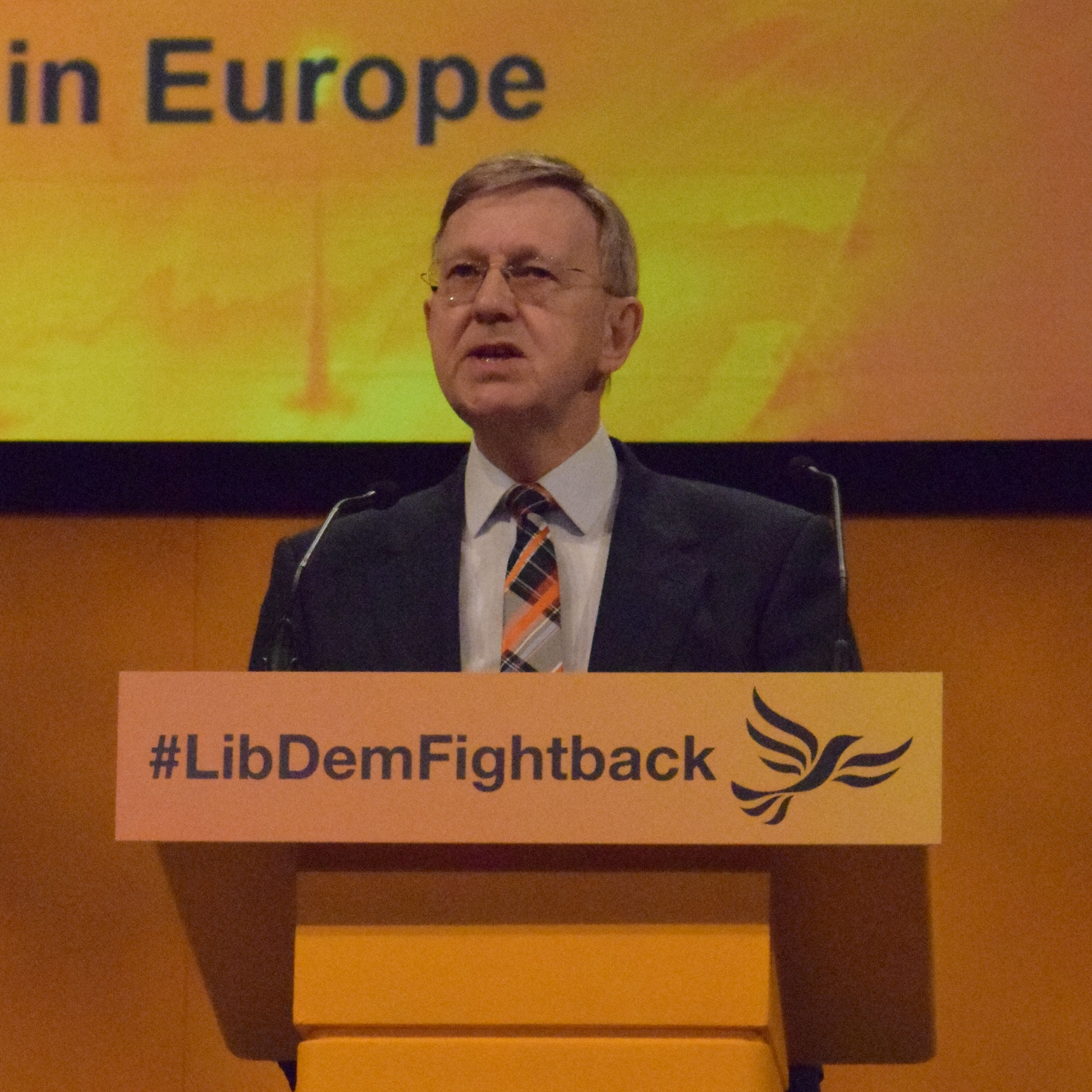

Member of the European Parliament for London South East
- In office 14 June 1984 – 9 June 1994
- Preceded by: Brandon Rhys-Williams
- Succeeded by: Shaun Spiers

Member of the European Parliament for Lancashire West
- In office 7 June 1979 – 14 June 1984
- Preceded by: Constituency Created
- Succeeded by: Constituency Dissolved

Personal details
- Born: 19 February 1942 (age 84)
- Party: Liberal Democrat (since 1997)
- Other political affiliations: Conservative (until 1997)
- Education: University of Southampton; King's College London

Peter Nicholas Price (born 19 February 1942) is a British politician who served as a Member of the European Parliament (MEP) from 1979–1994.

He was educated at RGS Worcester, Aberdare Boys' Grammar School, the University of Southampton and at King's College London. He served as Conservative MEP for Lancashire West from 1979–1984, and as Conservative MEP for London South East from 1984–1994. He made headlines in 1997 when he changed parties from the Conservatives to the Liberal Democrats. He continues to work with both the Liberal Democrat party in Wales and with the European Strategy Council in London. Price trained as a solicitor in London which is still his main profession. From 2002-4 he served on the Richard Commission which proposed increased powers for the National Assembly for Wales, and he has served on various bodies associated with the Assembly. As of 2015 he is a member of the Board of the Wales Audit Office.
