= Dunstable and Leighton Buzzard =

UK Parliament constituency (since 2024)

- County constituency for the House of Commons
- Interactive map of boundaries from 2024
- Location within the East of England
- County: Bedfordshire
- Electorate: 74,069 (March 2020)
- Major settlements: Dunstable and Leighton Buzzard

Current constituency
- Created: 2024
- Member of Parliament: Alex Mayer (Labour)
- Seats: One
- Created from: South West Bedfordshire

Dunstable and Leighton Buzzard is a constituency of the House of Commons in the UK Parliament. It was first contested at the 2024 general election. The current MP is Alex Mayer of the Labour Party.

== Constituency profile ==
The Dunstable and Leighton Buzzard constituency is located in Bedfordshire. It covers the towns of Dunstable and Houghton Regis, which lie on the outskirts of the large town of Luton, and the town of Leighton Buzzard. The three towns in the constituency are historic market towns. Deprivation in the constituency is low and the area is generally wealthy, particularly in Leighton Buzzard.

In general, residents have average levels of education and professional employment with above-average household income. At the 2021 census, White people made up 87% of the population. At the local council, Leighton Buzzard is mostly represented by Liberal Democrats, whilst Dunstable and Houghton Regis elected a variety of councillors including Liberal Democrats, Labour Party, Conservatives and independents. The rural area between Leighton Buzzard and Dunstable is represented by Conservatives. An estimated 59% of voters in the constituency supported leaving the European Union in the 2016 referendum compared to 52% nationwide.

== History ==
The seat is a successor to South West Bedfordshire which was a Conservative seat during its existence, often with large majorities, though Labour came very close to winning the seat on two occasions in 1997 and 2001, reducing the Conservative Party's majorities to 132 and 776 respectively. Labour won the seat in 2024 narrowly on a three-figure majority for the first time since a previous incarnation of the constituency (South Bedfordshire), in 1966.

== Boundaries ==
Further to the 2023 review of Westminster constituencies, the composition of the constituency was defined as follows (as they existed on 1 December 2020):

- Dunstable–Central; Dunstable–Icknield; Dunstable–Manshead; Dunstable–Northfields; Dunstable–Watling; Heath and Reach; Houghton Hall; Leighton Buzzard North; Leighton Buzzard South; Linslade; Parkside; Tithe Farm.

It comprises the communities of Dunstable, Leighton Buzzard, Linslade and Houghton Regis and is the successor to South West Bedfordshire - excluding Eaton Bray, which was transferred to the renamed constituency of Luton South and South Bedfordshire.

Following a local government boundary review which came into effect in May 2023, the constituency now comprises the following wards of Central Bedfordshire from the 2024 general election:

- Dunstable Central; Dunstable East; Dunstable North; Dunstable South; Dunstable West; Heath & Reach; Houghton Regis East; Houghton Regis West; Leighton-Linslade North; Leighton-Linslade South; Leighton-Linslade West

== Members of Parliament ==
South West Bedfordshire prior to 2024

Election	Member	Party
2024	Alex Mayer	Labour

== Elections ==
=== Elections in the 2020s ===
2024 general election: Dunstable and Leighton Buzzard
Party	Candidate	Votes	%	±%
Labour	Alex Mayer	14,976	32.5	+5.7
Conservative	Andrew Selous	14,309	31.1	−27.6
Reform	Harry Palmer	8,071	17.5	New
Liberal Democrats	Emma Holland-Lindsay	6,497	14.1	+3.3
Green	Sukhinder Hundal	2,115	4.6	+0.9
English Democrat	Antonio Vitiello	77	0.2	New
Majority		667	1.4	
Turnout		46,045	60.0	−5.2
Registered electors		76,742		
Labour gain from Conservative		Swing	+16.7	

=== Elections in the 2010s ===
2019 notional result
Party	Vote	%
Conservative	28,341	58.7
Labour	12,955	26.8
Liberal Democrats	5,210	10.8
Green	1,764	3.7
Turnout	48,270	65.2
Electorate	74,069	

== See also ==
- List of parliamentary constituencies in Bedfordshire
