= Friends of Democratic Cuba =

Organization based in New Orleans

Friends of Democratic Cuba was formed on January 6, 1961, to serve as the fund-raising arm of anti-Castro activist Sergio Arcacha Smith's New Orleans' branch of the Cuban Revolutionary Council (CRC).

According to an October 26, 1967, CIA document: "This organization was created by several New Orleans business and political figures, including the deceased former FBI agent, Guy Banister, to collect money to aid Cubans in their fight against Communism." Guy Banister, helped draw up a charter for the organization and was on its board of directors. According to the before cited CIA document: "One month after the FDC [Friends of Democratic Cuba] was created, it was put out of business by strong criticism from prominent Cubans. There was evidence that the FDC was organized strictly for the personal gain of the promoters."
