= Protection of Children Act 1978 =

Act of the Parliament of the United Kingdom outlawing child pornography

Protection of Children Act 1978 (Note: Section 9(1).)
- Act of Parliament
- Parliament of the United Kingdom
- Long title: An Act to prevent the exploitation of children by making indecent photographs of them; and to penalise the distribution, showing and advertisement of such indecent photographs.
- Citation: 1978 c. 37
- Introduced by: Cyril Townsend (Commons)
- Territorial extent: England and Wales

Dates
- Royal assent: 20 July 1978
- Commencement: 20 July 1978 (section 8); 20 August 1978 (rest of act); (Note: Section 9(3).)
Other legislation
| Amends | Extradition Act 1870; Visiting Forces Act 1952; Children and Young Persons Act 1963; Fugitive Offenders Act 1967 |
| Amended by | Magistrates' Courts Act 1980; Police and Criminal Evidence Act 1984; Criminal Justice Act 1988; Extradition Act 1989; Criminal Justice and Public Order Act 1994; Criminal Justice and Court Services Act 2000; Courts Act 2003; Sexual Offences Act 2003; Civil Partnership Act 2004; Police and Justice Act 2006; Criminal Justice and Immigration Act 2008; Coroners and Justice Act 2009; Online Safety Act 2023 |
| Relates to | Protection of Children (Northern Ireland) Order 1978; Civic Government (Scotland) Act 1982 |

Status: Amended

Text of statute as originally enacted

Text of the Protection of Children Act 1978 as in force today (including any amendments) within the United Kingdom, from legislation.gov.uk.

The Protection of Children Act 1978 (c. 37) is an act of the Parliament of the United Kingdom that criminalises indecent photographs of children. The act applies in England and Wales. Similar provision for Scotland is contained in the Civic Government (Scotland) Act 1982 and for Northern Ireland in the Protection of Children (Northern Ireland) Order 1978.

== Passage ==
The Protection of Children Bill was put before Parliament as a Private Member's Bill by the Conservative member of parliament Cyril Townsend in the 1977–1978 parliamentary session. This bill came about as a result of the concern over child pornography and the sexual exploitation of children that had arisen in the United States of America in 1977. This cause was taken up in the UK by the press and Mary Whitehouse, who in a speech in 1977 had accused the Albany Trust of using public money effectively supporting the Paedophile Information Exchange (the project for a joint Albany/PIE pamphlet was scrapped). Decades later, it emerged that she had been accurate in her assertion. The existence of PIE was given by Townsend as an issue favouring legislation against child pornography. Whitehouse's National Viewers' and Listeners' Association was able to campaign in support of the Bill and present a petition bearing 1.5 million signatures.

When the progress of the bill was threatened by MP Ian Mikardo, who blocked it to protest against tactics being used by the Conservative party to block Edward Fletcher's bill on employment protection, the Prime Minister, James Callaghan, stepped in to ensure that the Bill received the time required to become law.

== Offences ==
Currently, the act defines as offences, roughly:

- To take or make any indecent photograph or pseudo-photograph of a child;
- To show or distribute such (pseudo-)photographs;
- To possess such (pseudo-)photographs with intent to show or distribute them;
- To advertise for showing or distributing such (pseudo-)photographs.

== Amendments ==
=== 1994 ===
Originally, in 1978, the act referred to "photographs". In 1994, to cover also actions involving images created or altered with machines like computers, the act was amended by the Criminal Justice and Public Order Act 1994, to refer to taking, or making, "photographs or pseudo-photographs", etcetera.

=== 2008 ===
The act was further amended by the Criminal Justice and Immigration Act 2008, which provided that "photograph" includes:

"a tracing or other image, whether made by electronic or other means (of whatever nature)— (i) which is not itself a photograph or pseudo-photograph, but (ii) which is derived from the whole or part of a photograph or pseudo-photograph (or a combination of either or both)," and including data stored on a computer disc or by any other form of electronic means that can be converted into such an image.

== Definitions ==
=== The "making" offence ===
Causing an indecent photograph of a child to exist on a computer screen is considered to be "making an indecent photograph of a child".

"A person who either downloads images on to disc or who prints them off is making them. The act is not only concerned with the original creation of images, but also their proliferation. Photographs or pseudo-photographs found on the Internet may have originated from outside the United Kingdom; to download or print within the jurisdiction is to create new material which hitherto may not have existed therein." (R v Bowden)

Because of the Bowden decision, it was also necessary to add a defence where it was necessary to make an indecent photograph or pseudo-photograph for the purposes of a criminal investigation.

1.– (1) Subject to sections 1A and 1B, it is an offence for a person–

(a) to take, or permit to be taken or to make, any indecent photograph or pseudo-photograph of a child; or
(b) to distribute or show such indecent photographs or pseudo-photographs; or
(c) to have in his possession such indecent photographs or pseudo-photographs, with a view to their being distributed or shown by himself or others; or
(d) to publish or cause to be published any advertisement likely to be understood as conveying that the advertiser distributes or shows such indecent photographs or pseudo-photographs or intends to do so.

=== Definition of a child ===
Initially, the definition of a child was contained in the definition of offences:

1.-(1) It is an offence for a person-

(a) to take, or permit to be taken, any indecent photograph of a child (meaning in this Act a person under the age of 16);

While adding the definition of pseudo-photographs, the 1994 Act deleted this definition and inserted a new subsection to the interpretation section:-

7.-(6) 'Child', subject to subsection (8), means a person under the age of 16.

Subsection (8) defines pseudo-photographs.

Section 45 of the Sexual Offences Act 2003 made a number of changes to the 1978 Act. Principally it redefines a "child" for the purposes of the 1978 Act as a person under 18 years, rather than under 16 years, of age.

Section 45 of the Sexual Offences Act 2003 also inserted new sections 1A (Marriage and other relationships) into the 1978 Act and 160A into the Criminal Justice Act 1988. These sections apply where, in proceedings for an offence under section 1 of the 1978 Act or section 160 of the 1988 Act relating to an indecent photograph of a child, the defendant proves that the photograph was of the child aged 16 or over, and that at the time of the offence charged the child and the defendant were married or in a relationship. These sections were further amended by the Civil Partnerships Act 2004 to "civil relationships" after "were married"

=== Definition of photograph ===
'Photograph' shall include film, video-recording, copy of photograph or film or video-recording, photo comprised in a film or video-recording; negatives of photograph etc.; data on a computer etc. which can be converted to photograph etc.

=== Definition of indecent ===
The act does not define the term 'indecent'.

=== Definition of pseudo-photograph ===
The act defines a pseudo-photograph as "an image, whether made by computer-graphics or otherwise howsoever, which appears to be a photograph", and further a copy of a pseudo-photograph, including data stored on a computer disc or by any other form of electronic means that can be converted into a pseudo-photograph.

== Offences committed abroad ==
Offences under this Act are subject to the dual criminality provisions of s.72 of the Sexual Offences Act 2003, meaning that British citizens who commit offences abroad involving indecent images of children can be prosecuted in the United Kingdom.

== Interpretation ==
=== Indecency ===
In R v Graham-Kerr (1988), the accused had taken photographs of a young boy at a nudist meeting at a public swimming baths. The Court of Appeal held that the motivation of the photographer had no influence on the decency or otherwise of the photographs taken; a photograph is an indecent photograph of a child if it is indecent, and if it shows a child.

Whether or not a photograph or pseudo-photograph is indecent is a question of fact, and as a question of fact it is something for a jury or magistrate to decide. The jury should apply the standard of decency which ordinary right-thinking members of the public would set - the "recognised standards of propriety" as R v Stamford [1972] puts it.

=== Relevance of the age of a known subject ===
In R v Owen (1988), it was held that age of the child in the photograph is a consideration the jury should bear in mind when deciding whether or not the image is "indecent". Owen was a professional photographer who had taken a number of photographs of a 14-year-old girl who, it was claimed, wanted to become a model. In these photographs the girl was scantily dressed and showing her bare breasts. The defence argued that the image should be judged as it stood, disregarding evidence of the girl's age - presumably thinking that a similar image showing a model over the age of 16 would not be considered indecent at that time.

=== Computer files ===
In R v Fellows (1997) the Court of Appeal held that a computer file came within the scope of the definitions of the act.

Section 7(2) of the 1978 Act defines references to an indecent photograph as including a copy of an indecent photograph.

A computer file contains data, not visible, which can be converted by appropriate technical means into a screen image and into a print which exactly reproduces the original photograph from which it was derived. It is a form of copy which makes the original photograph, or a copy of it, available for viewing by a person who has access to the file. There is nothing in the act which makes it necessary that a copy should itself be a photograph within the dictionary or the statutory definition, and if there was, it would make the inclusion of the reference to a copy unnecessary. The Court of Appeal concluded that there is no restriction on the nature of a copy, and that the data in a computer file represents the original photograph, in another form.

=== Establishing mens rea ===
In 2003, the Sentencing Advisory Panel provided guidance for Judges considering sentences for people convicted of an offence under the Protection of Children Act. The lowest level of indecency was described as "images depicting erotic posing with no sexual activity."

In R v Mould (2000), the Appeal Court ruled that "Mr Burton [representing Mr Mould] was rightly concerned that the jury, in deciding whether or not the photograph was indecent, would wrongly take into account [data showing access to paedophile discussion forums]." Although it was agreed that the jury should not use such information to make a judgment regarding the decency of the image for which Mr Mould was convicted, it was understood that "the prosecution [successfully] sought to rely on it in order to prove that the appellant had deliberately created the .bmp file."

While a defendant's proven sexual attraction to children should not affect indecency, it may affect the perceived mens rea of an act.

=== Prosecuting a photograph where the age of the subject is unknown ===
Where the age of the subject of a photograph is uncertain (i.e. where the identity of the subject is unknown), the subject's age shall be determined from the photograph.

Section 2.-(3) provides that a person is to be taken as having been a child at any material time if it appears from the evidence as a whole that he was then under the defined age of a child.

In R v Land (1997), the Court of Appeal held that a jury is as well placed as an expert (e.g. a paediatrician) to assess any argument addressed to the question whether the prosecution had established that the person depicted in a photograph was a child, and in any event expert evidence would be inadmissible: expert evidence is admitted only to assist the court with information which was outside the normal experience and knowledge of the judge or jury.

=== Making photographs (computer files) ===
In an appeal against conviction in R v Bowden (1999), the Court of Appeal held that downloading data representing indecent photographs of children from the Internet amounts to an offence within the meaning of s.1(1)(a) of the Protection of Children Act 1978.

=== Collages ===
In Goodland v DPP (2000), Lord Justice Simon Brown ruled that "an image made by an exhibit which obviously consists, as this one does, of parts of two different photographs sellotaped together cannot be said to appear to be "a photograph". This means that, if an item does not appear to be a single photograph, it does not fall within the scope of the Protection of Children Act. A photocopy or scan of such an item may appear to be a single photograph and so fall under the act and could therefore be illegal if it shows a child and is judged to be indecent.

== Sentencing ==
The sentencing guidelines for offences committed contrary to the Protection of Children Act were decided by the Sentencing Advisory Panel, to assist with sentencing during R v Oliver et al.. They have since been updated by the Sentencing Council.

The categories of indecent images are as follows:

| Category | Definition |
|---|---|
| A (formerly levels 4-5) | Images involving penetrative sexual activity between an adult and a child, or sexual activity with an animal or sadism |
| B (formerly levels 2-3) | Images involving non-penetrative sexual activity, or sexual activity between two children or solo masturbation by a child |
| C (formerly level 1) | Indecent images with no sexual activity (for example, showing children in sexualised poses) |

Judges use the following guidelines when sentencing someone who has been convicted under the Protection of Children Act:

| Highest category | Starting point / category range | Possession | Distribution | Production |
|---|---|---|---|---|
| Category A | Starting point | 1 year's custody | 3 years' custody | 6 years' custody |
| Category A | Category range | 26 weeks' – 3 years' custody | 2 – 5 years' custody | 4 – 9 years' custody |
| Category B | Starting point | 26 weeks' custody | 1 year's custody | 2 years' custody |
| Category B | Category range | High level community order – 18 months' custody | 26 weeks’ – 2 years' custody | 1 – 4 years' custody |
| Category C | Starting point | High level community order | 13 weeks' custody | 18 months' custody |
| Category C | Category range | Medium level community order – 26 weeks' custody | High level community order – 26 weeks' custody | 1 – 3 years' custody |

A person who is convicted of an offence under the Protection of Children Act is also likely to be barred from working with children in the United Kingdom, and will be ordered to sign the Sex Offenders Register.

== Defences ==
There are a small number of defences against charges under the Protection of Children Act. Below is a list of defences set by the statutes, precedents and case law.

=== Marriage and enduring relationships ===
On May 1, 2004, when section 45 of the Sexual Offences Act 2003 came into force, raising the general minimum age to appear in sexual images, in England and Wales, from 16 to 18, under the Protection of Children Act 1978, exceptions were provided for in law for contexts in which images of 16 and 17-years-olds were to remain lawful, these being under the following contexts:

In cases where a defendant has taken or made a photographic image of a child over the age of 16, the defendant is not guilty if, at the time when they obtained the photograph, they and the child:

(a) were married; or

(b) lived together as partners in an enduring family relationship^{1}; and

(c) the defendant reasonably believed that the child consented to the image being obtained.

This exemption was introduced in 2003 under the Sexual Offences Act, which had changed the statutory definition of "child" (in the Protection of Children Act) from 16 to 18.
^{1} - A definition of "enduring family relationship" is not supplied within the act.

=== Mens rea ===
The common-law mens rea defence applies to the Protection of Children Act offences. The prosecution must demonstrate that a defendant took a photograph deliberately, intending it to be an indecent photograph showing a child. Presumabably the notion of intention is that defined elsewhere in English criminal law found in Woolin [1998]: that is, either clear intent or (summarised) 'whatever the defendant's purpose, if it is virtually certain that the actus reus will result from the defendant's action, then the jury may infer intent."

By the latter test mere foreseeability or likelihood will not suffice (see Nedrick and Woollin) as this encroaches on the notion of recklessness. It would appear that the offences in the act are of specific intent (that is, intent is required and not mere recklessness, and certainly the offences are not absolute with strict liability, see Smith and Jayson below).

This was upheld in R v Smith and Jayson (2003), where it was held that "the mens rea necessary to constitute the offence [of making an indecent pseudo-photograph of a child] is that the act of making should be a deliberate and intentional act with knowledge that the image made is, or is likely to be, an indecent image of a child"

It is thus a defence for the defendant to raise sufficient doubt about whether he took, made, distributed, showed or possessed an image without the knowledge that the image was, or was likely to be:

- an indecent image; and
- an image of a child.

Further to this, if an image is found only in a computer cache, if the defendant can reasonably be thought not to have had knowledge of the existence of the cache, he is innocent of a possession offence. The mere existence of the image in the cache should not necessarily be sufficient proof that the image was made when it was downloaded, however; this should be backed up by evidence of an intentional directed search, for example (see Atkins v DPP).

The definition of the mens rea for making, however was thought to be thrown into confusion by the decision in Harrison v R [2007] EWCA Crim 2976 where it was suggested that if the actions of the defendant were very likely to make an image that would constitute the mens rea. Smith and Jayson however were not overtly overruled and Harrison is regarded as made per incuriam or at least a badly worded setting out of the rule found in Woollin. In Harrison there was clear and admitted evidence that a directed (and "unusual") search for and visit to a site had been made which would fall under the Woollin rule - it could be argued that it was a virtual certainty that images would be made (in the cache). Harrison knew that pop-ups which contained indecent images of children would be produced and carried on regardless.

== See also ==
- Child pornography laws in the United Kingdom
- Criminal Justice Act 1988
- Criminal Justice and Public Order Act 1994
- Paedophile Information Exchange
- Sexual Offences Act 2003
