= Bexleyheath (constituency) =

UK Parliament constituency (1974–1997)

Coordinates: 51.45°N 0.14°E

- Former borough constituency for the House of Commons
- Boundary of Bexleyheath in for the 1983 general election
- County: Greater London

February 1974–1997
- Seats: One
- Created from: Bexley
- Replaced by: Bexleyheath & Crayford, Old Bexley and Sidcup

Bexleyheath was a parliamentary constituency in south-east London, which returned one Member of Parliament (MP) to the House of Commons of the Parliament of the United Kingdom.

== Politics and history of the constituency ==
It was created for the February 1974 general election, and abolished for the 1997 general election.

This safe Conservative seat was represented for its entire existence by Sir Cyril Townsend.

== Boundaries ==
| Dates | Local authority | Maps | Wards |
|---|---|---|---|
| 1974–1983 | London Borough of Bexley | | Brampton, Christchurch, Danson, East Wickham, Falconwood, St Michael's, and Upton. |
| 1983–1997 | London Borough of Bexley | | Barnehurst, Barnehurst North, Brampton, Christchurch, Danson, East Wickham, Falconwood, St Michael's, and Upton. |

This constituency in the London Borough of Bexley was centred on the district of Bexleyheath. It was split in 1997 when the Boundary Commission for England recommended an extra seat for the paired boroughs of Bexley and Greenwich. It was largely replaced by the new constituency of Bexleyheath and Crayford, with about a third of the constituency being added to the existing Old Bexley and Sidcup constituency.

== Members of Parliament ==
| Election | Member | Party |
|---|---|---|
| Feb 1974 | Cyril Townsend | Conservative |
| 1997 | constituency abolished: see Bexleyheath and Crayford & Old Bexley and Sidcup | |

== Election results ==
=== Elections in the 1970s ===
1970 notional result
| Party | Vote | % |
|---|---|---|
| Conservative | 20,500 | 51.3 |
| Labour | 15,700 | 39.3 |
| Liberal | 2,500 | 6.3 |
| Others | 1,300 | 3.3 |
| Turnout | 40,000 | 76.3 |
| Electorate | 52,450 | |

General election February 1974: Bexleyheath
| Party | Candidate | Votes | % | ±% |
|---|---|---|---|---|
| Conservative | Cyril Townsend | 18,541 | 43.3 | –7.9 |
| Labour Co-op | John Cartwright | 14,675 | 34.3 | –5.0 |
| Liberal | W. Pickard | 9,575 | 22.4 | +16.1 |
| Majority | | 3,866 | 9.0 | –3.0 |
| Turnout | | 42,791 | 84.6 | +8.4 |
| Registered electors | | 50,558 | | |
| Conservative hold | | Swing | –1.5 | |

General election October 1974: Bexleyheath
| Party | Candidate | Votes | % | ±% |
|---|---|---|---|---|
| Conservative | Cyril Townsend | 17,399 | 43.8 | +0.5 |
| Labour | J. Stanyer | 15,412 | 38.8 | +4.5 |
| Liberal | W. Pickard | 6,882 | 17.3 | –5.0 |
| Majority | | 1,987 | 5.0 | –4.0 |
| Turnout | | 39,693 | 77.8 | −6.8 |
| Registered electors | | 51,022 | | |
| Conservative hold | | Swing | −2.0 | |

General election 1979: Bexleyheath
| Party | Candidate | Votes | % | ±% |
|---|---|---|---|---|
| Conservative | Cyril Townsend | 21,888 | 53.7 | +9.9 |
| Labour | Richard Blackwell | 13,342 | 32.7 | −6.1 |
| Liberal | John Crowhurst | 4,782 | 11.7 | −5.6 |
| National Front | Alan Wilkens | 749 | 1.8 | New |
| Majority | | 8,546 | 21.0 | +16.0 |
| Turnout | | 40,761 | 80.1 | +2.3 |
| Registered electors | | 50,872 | | |
| Conservative hold | | Swing | +8.0 | |

1979 notional result
| Party | Vote | % |
|---|---|---|
| Conservative | 26,007 | 54.2 |
| Labour | 15,620 | 32.6 |
| Liberal | 5,459 | 11.4 |
| Others | 875 | 1.8 |
| Turnout | 47,961 | |
| Electorate | | |

=== Elections in the 1980s ===
General election 1983: Bexleyheath
| Party | Candidate | Votes | % | ±% |
|---|---|---|---|---|
| Conservative | Cyril Townsend | 23,411 | 53.1 | −1.2 |
| Liberal | Barry Standen | 13,153 | 29.8 | +18.4 |
| Labour | Andrew Erlam | 7,560 | 17.1 | −15.4 |
| Majority | | 10,258 | 23.3 | +1.6 |
| Turnout | | 44,124 | 74.5 | −5.6 |
| Registered electors | | 59,263 | | |
| Conservative hold | | Swing | −9.8 | |

General election 1987: Bexleyheath
| Party | Candidate | Votes | % | ±% |
|---|---|---|---|---|
| Conservative | Cyril Townsend | 24,866 | 53.7 | +0.7 |
| Liberal | Barry Standen | 13,179 | 28.5 | −1.3 |
| Labour | James Little | 8,218 | 17.8 | +0.6 |
| Majority | | 11,687 | 25.3 | +2.0 |
| Turnout | | 46,263 | 77.8 | +3.4 |
| Registered electors | | 59,448 | | |
| Conservative hold | | Swing | +1.0 | |

=== Elections in the 1990s ===
General election 1992: Bexleyheath
| Party | Candidate | Votes | % | ±% |
|---|---|---|---|---|
| Conservative | Cyril Townsend | 25,606 | 54.0 | +0.3 |
| Labour | John Browning | 11,520 | 24.3 | +6.5 |
| Liberal Democrats | Wendy Chaplin | 10,107 | 21.3 | −7.2 |
| Independent | Roger W.C. Cundy | 170 | 0.4 | New |
| Majority | | 14,086 | 29.7 | +4.5 |
| Turnout | | 47,403 | 82.2 | +4.4 |
| Registered electors | | 57,684 | | |
| Conservative hold | | Swing | −3.1 | |

== See also ==
- List of parliamentary constituencies in London
