= Friends of a Democratic Cuba =

Friends of a Democratic Cuba (Spanish: Amigos de una Cuba Democrática) was a forum to advise the Cuban dissident movement on strategies used by Eastern Bloc dissident movements. It was founded in 2006 by the United States Department of State and representatives from the Czech Republic, Hungary, Lithuania, Poland, Slovakia, and Slovenia. Voice of America expressed that the group intends to help Cubans "get uncensored information".

At the inaugural "Cuba Transition to Democracy Summit", former President of Uruguay Luis Alberto Lacalle called for a "Marti Plan", an economic recovery fund for post-transition Cuba like the Marshall Plan.
