= Erith and Crayford =

Parliamentary constituency in the United Kingdom, 1955–1997

Coordinates: 51.46°N 0.18°E

- Former borough constituency for the House of Commons

1955–1997
- Created from: Dartford
- Replaced by: Erith and Thamesmead and Bexleyheath and Crayford

Erith and Crayford was a constituency which returned one Member of Parliament (MP) to the House of Commons of the UK's Parliament.

It was created for the 1955 general election, and abolished for the 1997 general election, when it was replaced by the new constituencies of Erith and Thamesmead and Bexleyheath and Crayford.

For its final 32 years it was in the London Borough of Bexley, south-east London but for its first ten years instead in Kent, divided among two council districts, below the higher tier of Kent County Council.

== Boundaries ==
Erith and Crayford in Kent, boundaries used 1955-74

1955–1974: The Municipal Borough of Erith, and the Urban District of Crayford.

1974–1983: The London Borough of Bexley wards of Belvedere, Bostall, Crayford North, Crayford Town, Crayford West, Erith Town, and Northumberland Heath.

1983–1997: The London Borough of Bexley wards of Belvedere, Bostall, Crayford, Erith, North End, Northumberland Heath, and Thamesmead East.

== Members of Parliament ==
Election	Member	Party	Notes
1955	Norman Dodds	Labour Co-op	Previously MP for Dartford from 1945. Died 1965
1965 by-election	James Wellbeloved	Labour	
1981	James Wellbeloved	SDP	
1983	David Evennett	Conservative	Contested and lost Bexleyheath and Crayford in 1997. Subsequently, MP for the seat from 2005
1997	constituency abolished: see Erith and Thamesmead & Bexleyheath and Crayford		

== Elections ==
=== Elections in the 1950s ===
General election 1955: Erith and Crayford
Party	Candidate	Votes	%	±%
Labour Co-op	Norman Dodds	24,957	60.43	
Conservative	Edward Gardner	16,339	39.57	
Majority		8,618	20.86	
Turnout		41,296		
Labour Co-op win (new seat)				

General election 1959: Erith and Crayford
Party	Candidate	Votes	%	±%
Labour Co-op	Norman Dodds	24,523	56.65	
Conservative	James J Davis	18,763	43.35	
Majority		5,760	13.30	
Turnout		43,286		
Labour Co-op hold		Swing		

=== Elections in the 1960s ===
General election 1964: Erith and Crayford
Party	Candidate	Votes	%	±%
Labour Co-op	Norman Dodds	22,806	53.1	−3.5
Conservative	B Black	13,951	32.3	−11.0
Liberal	Stanley W Vince	6,189	14.4	New
Majority		8,855	20.8	+7.5
Turnout		42,946		
Labour Co-op hold		Swing		

By-election 1965: Erith and Crayford
Party	Candidate	Votes	%	±%
Labour	James Wellbeloved	21,835	55.4	+2.3
Conservative	David Madel	14,763	37.5	+5.2
Liberal	Stanley W Vince	2,823	7.2	−7.2
Majority		7,072	17.9	−2.9
Turnout		39,421		
Labour hold		Swing		

General election 1966: Erith and Crayford
Party	Candidate	Votes	%	±%
Labour	James Wellbeloved	24,243	55.53	
Conservative	David Madel	15,033	34.43	
Liberal	Stanley W Vince	3,827	8.77	
Communist	L Smith	556	1.27	New
Majority		9,210	21.10	
Turnout		43,659		
Labour hold		Swing		

=== Elections in the 1970s ===
General election 1970: Erith and Crayford
Party	Candidate	Votes	%	±%
Labour	James Wellbeloved	23,012	55.9	+0.4
Conservative	H.J. Jackson	18,158	44.1	+9.7
Majority		4,854	11.8	−9.3
Turnout		41,170	71.3	
Labour hold		Swing		

General election February 1974: Erith and Crayford
Party	Candidate	Votes	%	±%
Labour	James Wellbeloved	22,632	46.1	−9.8
Conservative	R.I. Raitt	15,551	31.7	−12.4
Liberal	Stanley W. Vince	10,951	22.3	New
Majority		7,081	14.4	+2.6
Turnout		49,134	81.8	+10.5
Labour hold		Swing		

General election October 1974: Erith and Crayford
Party	Candidate	Votes	%	±%
Labour	James Wellbeloved	22,670	51.2	+5.1
Conservative	M. MacDonald	14,203	32.1	+0.4
Liberal	T. Hibbert	7,423	16.8	−5.5
Majority		8,467	19.1	+4.7
Turnout		44,296	73.1	−8.7
Labour hold		Swing		

General election 1979: Erith and Crayford
Party	Candidate	Votes	%	±%
Labour	James Wellbeloved	22,450	47.3	−3.9
Conservative	Simon Blunt	19,717	41.5	+9.4
Liberal	Florence Jamieson	4,512	9.5	−7.3
National Front	Owen Hawke	838	1.8	New
Majority		2,733	5.8	−13.3
Turnout		47,517	77.5	+4.4
Labour hold		Swing	−6.6	

=== Elections in the 1980s ===
General election 1983: Erith and Crayford
Party	Candidate	Votes	%	±%
Conservative	David Evennett	15,289	37.1	−1.7
SDP	James Wellbeloved	14,369	34.9	+25.4
Labour	Malcolm Smart	11,260	27.3	−22.7
BNP	O. Hawke	272	0.7	New
Majority		920	2.2	N/A
Turnout		41,190	73.5	−4.0
Conservative gain from Labour		Swing	+10.5	

General election 1987: Erith and Crayford
Party	Candidate	Votes	%	±%
Conservative	David Evennett	20,203	45.2	+8.1
Labour	Colin Hargrave	13,209	29.5	+2.2
SDP	James Wellbeloved	11,300	25.3	−9.6
Majority		6,994	15.7	+13.5
Turnout		44,712	75.4	+1.9
Conservative hold		Swing	+2.6	

=== Elections in the 1990s ===
General election 1992: Erith and Crayford
Party	Candidate	Votes	%	±%
Conservative	David Evennett	21,926	46.5	+1.3
Labour	Nigel Beard	19,587	41.5	+12.0
Liberal Democrats	Florence M. Jamieson	5,657	12.0	−13.3
Majority		2,339	5.0	−10.7
Turnout		47,170	79.7	+4.3
Conservative hold		Swing	−5.3	
