= Bexleyheath and Crayford =

UK Parliament constituency (since 1997)

Coordinates: 51.46°N 0.16°E

- Borough constituency for the House of Commons
- Interactive map of boundaries since 2024
- Location within Greater London
- County: Greater London
- Population: 109,200 (2022)
- Electorate: 69,948 (March 2020)

Current constituency
- Created: 1997
- Member of Parliament: Daniel Francis (Labour)
- Seats: One
- Created from: Bexleyheath and Erith & Crayford

Bexleyheath and Crayford is a constituency (Note: A borough constituency (for the purposes of election expenses and type of returning officer).) in Greater London represented in the House of Commons of the UK Parliament by Daniel Francis following his victory in the 2024 general election for the Labour Party. (Note: As with all constituencies, the constituency elects one Member of Parliament (MP) by the first past the post system of election at least every five years.)

It was created in 1997 from parts of the former seats of Bexleyheath and Erith and Crayford.

== Constituency profile ==
Bexleyheath and Crayford is a predominantly suburban constituency, located in the Borough of Bexley on the outskirts of London. It contains the towns of Bexleyheath and Crayford and the neighbourhood of Slade Green.

The area was historically rural and developed rapidly following the arrival of railways in the late 19th century. Compared to the rest of the country, residents of the constituency are wealthier and have similar levels of education and professional employment. The constituency is less ethnically diverse than other parts of London but more so than the country as a whole; 73% of residents are White, 11% are Black and 10% are Asian. At the most recent borough council election in 2022, most of the constituency's seats were won by Conservatives, whilst the areas closer to the Thames elected Labour Party councillors. Unlike most of London, Bexleyheath and Crayford voted strongly in favour of leaving the European Union in the 2016 referendum, estimated at 65% of voters.

== Boundaries ==
=== Historic ===
1997–2010: The London Borough of Bexley wards of Barnehurst, Barnehurst North, Bostall, Brampton, Christchurch, Crayford, North End, St Michael's, and Upton.

2010–2024: The London Borough of Bexley wards of Barnehurst, Brampton, Christchurch, Colyers, Crayford, Danson Park, North End, and St Michael's.

=== Current ===
Further to the completion of the 2023 review of Westminster constituencies, which came into effect for the 2024 general election, the constituency comprises:

- The London Borough of Bexley wards of Barnehurst; Bexleyheath; Crayford; Crook Log; Northumberland Heath; Slade Green & Northend; West Heath.

The revised contents take into account the local government boundary review for Bexley which became effective in May 2018. Boundaries were extended northwards, gaining parts of Erith and Thamesmead, offset by westernmost areas being transferred to Old Bexley and Sidcup.

== Members of Parliament ==
See Bexley, Bexleyheath and Erith and Crayford for related results from 1955 to 1997.

Election	Member	Party
1997	Nigel Beard	Labour
2005	David Evennett	Conservative
2024	Daniel Francis	Labour

== Election results ==
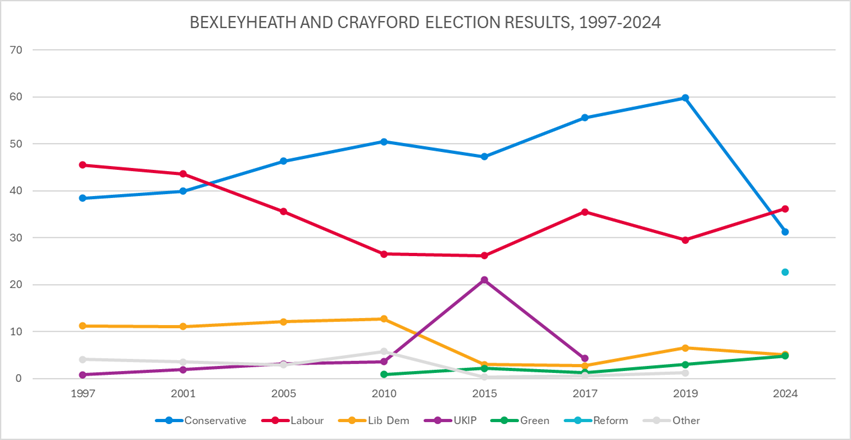
Election results 1997-2024

=== Elections in the 2020s ===
General election 2024: Bexleyheath and Crayford
Party	Candidate	Votes	%	±%
Labour	Daniel Francis	15,717	36.2	▲7.2
Conservative	Mark Brooks	13,603	31.3	▼29.5
Reform	Tom Bright	9,861	22.7	▲21.8
Liberal Democrats	David McBride	2,204	5.1	▼0.9
Green	George Edgar	2,076	4.8	▲2.5
Majority		2,114	4.9	
Turnout		43,461	62.6	▼5.0
Registered electors		69,470		
Labour gain from Conservative		Swing	▲18.4	

=== Elections in the 2010s ===
2019 notional result (Note: Estimate of the 2019 general election result as if the revised boundaries recommended under the 2023 boundary review were in place)
Party	Vote	%
Conservative	28,750	60.8
Labour	13,712	29.0
Liberal Democrats	2,832	6.0
Green	1,070	2.3
Others	520	1.1
Brexit Party	416	0.9
Majority	15,038	31.8
Turnout	47,300	67.6
Electorate	69,948	

General election 2019: Bexleyheath and Crayford
Party	Candidate	Votes	%	±%
Conservative	David Evennett	25,856	59.8	+4.2
Labour	Anna Day	12,753	29.5	−6.0
Liberal Democrats	David McBride	2,819	6.5	+3.8
Green	Tony Ball	1,298	3.0	+1.7
English Democrat	Graham Moore	520	1.2	New
Majority		13,103	30.3	+10.3
Turnout		43,246	66.1	−3.1
Registered electors		65,466		
Conservative hold		Swing	+5.1	

General election 2017: Bexleyheath and Crayford
Party	Candidate	Votes	%	±%
Conservative	David Evennett	25,113	55.6	+8.3
Labour	Stefano Borella	16,040	35.5	+9.3
UKIP	Mike Ferro	1,944	4.3	−16.7
Liberal Democrats	Simone Reynolds	1,201	2.7	−0.3
Green	Ivor Lobo	601	1.3	−0.9
BNP	Peter Finch	290	0.6	New
Majority		9,073	20.1	−1.0
Turnout		45,189	69.2	+1.8
Registered electors		65,315		
Conservative hold		Swing	-0.65	

General election 2015: Bexleyheath and Crayford
Party	Candidate	Votes	%	±%
Conservative	David Evennett	20,643	47.3	−3.2
Labour	Stefano Borella	11,451	26.2	−0.3
UKIP	Chris Attard	9,182	21.0	+17.4
Liberal Democrats	Richard Davis	1,308	3.0	−9.7
Green	Stella Gardiner	950	2.2	+1.3
English Democrat	Maggi Young	151	0.3	−0.8
Majority		9,192	21.1	−2.9
Turnout		43,685	67.4	+1.0
Registered electors		64,828		
Conservative hold		Swing	-1.4	

General election 2010: Bexleyheath and Crayford
Party	Candidate	Votes	%	±%
Conservative	David Evennett	21,794	50.5	+3.9
Labour	Howard Dawber	11,450	26.5	−7.7
Liberal Democrats	Karelia Scott	5,502	12.7	−0.4
BNP	Stephen James	2,042	4.7	+1.8
UKIP	John Dunford	1,557	3.6	+0.4
English Democrat	John Griffiths	466	1.1	New
Green	Adrian Ross	371	0.9	New
Majority		10,344	24.0	+13.3
Turnout		43,182	66.4	+1.8
Registered electors		65,015		
Conservative hold		Swing	+5.8	

=== Elections in the 2000s ===
General election 2005: Bexleyheath and Crayford
Party	Candidate	Votes	%	±%
Conservative	David Evennett	19,722	46.3	+6.4
Labour	Nigel Beard	15,171	35.6	−8.0
Liberal Democrats	David Raval	5,144	12.1	+1.0
UKIP	John Dunford	1,302	3.1	+1.2
BNP	Jay Lee	1,245	2.9	−0.6
Majority		4,551	10.7	N/A
Turnout		42,584	65.5	+2.0
Registered electors		65,023		
Conservative gain from Labour		Swing	+7.2	

General election 2001: Bexleyheath and Crayford
Party	Candidate	Votes	%	±%
Labour	Nigel Beard	17,593	43.6	−1.9
Conservative	David Evennett	16,121	39.9	+1.5
Liberal Democrats	Nick O'Hare	4,476	11.1	−0.1
BNP	Colin Smith	1,408	3.5	+2.6
UKIP	John Dunford	780	1.9	+1.1
Majority		1,472	3.6	−3.5
Turnout		40,378	63.5	−12.6
Registered electors		63,580		
Labour hold		Swing	-1.7	

=== Elections in the 1990s ===
General election 1997: Bexleyheath and Crayford
Party	Candidate	Votes	%	±%
Labour	Nigel Beard	21,942	45.5	
Conservative	David Evennett	18,527	38.4	
Liberal Democrats	Francoise J. Montford	5,391	11.2	
Referendum	Barrie R. Thomas	1,551	3.2	
BNP	Pauline Smith	429	0.9	
UKIP	W. Jenner	383	0.8	
Majority		3,415	7.1	
Turnout		48,223	76.1	
Registered electors		63,373		
Labour win (new seat)				

== See also ==
- List of parliamentary constituencies in London
