= League for Democracy in Greece =

British organisation involved in the Greek Civil War

The League for Democracy in Greece was a British organisation founded in 1945 with the aim of supporting Greek resistance fighters and leftists in the Greek civil conflicts of the 1940s. The League was active during the 1946-1949 Greek Civil War and during the post-civil war years, and until the fall of the Greek military dictatorship in 1974. In 1974, it renamed itself to the Friends of Democracy in Greece and started functioning on a stand-by basis. Throughout its campaigning, the League kept an active relationship with trade unions and local organisations throughout Britain and Greece, and also with the Parliamentary Labour Party.

== History ==
The League for Democracy in Greece was founded mainly by members of parliament for the Labour Party who were disillusioned with the fact that Labour's victory in the July 1945 election had not led to a significant change in Britain's foreign policy with regards to post-war Greece. Labour had done little to change the hostile policies that Winston Churchill's government had implemented towards the Greek resistance front EAM, which was mainly an expression of the Greek Communist Party. The persecution of resistance fighters in post-war Greece continued during Clement Attlee's government, and in October 1945 Labour members and other left-wing Britons league.

The League was founded in October 1945 in a public meeting held in Garrick Theatre, London, to commemorate Greece's entering the Second World War against the Axis powers. Compton Mackenzie took on the role of chairman of the new organisation, though Denis Pritt chaired the meeting as Mackenzie was absent. Diana Pym was named honourable secretary (later joined by Marion Pascoe in 1946 as joint honourable secretaries) and she remained active in the organisation until its disbandment.

In the ensuing meetings, the League adopted the following aims:

1. To rebuild and strengthen the traditional friendship between the peoples of Greece and Britain on the basis of the establishment of democracy in Greece
2. To enlighten the British public about the situation in Greece and to promote cultural relations between the two countries
3. To provide relief to those Greeks who suffered for their democratic beliefs and activities and to their dependents and to the dependents of those Greeks who died fighting for democracy
4. To work for:
  1. a general amnesty for all Greek democrats imprisoned for political reasons
  2. the restoration of trade union and civil liberties
  3. the suppression of armed terrorism and the trial and punishment of collaborators

These continued to be the guiding aims of the organisation until its disbandment, except for the deletion of 4.3 as obsolete in the late sixties.

== 1946 Delegation and Tragedy in Greece ==
In April 1946, the League for Democracy in Greece received an invitation from the Greek Union of Democratic Associations to send a delegation to visit Greece and provide an eyewitness account of the political situation. On the 26 April, an LDG delegation consisting of Diana Pym along with the Labour MPs Norman Dodds, Stanley Tiffany and Leslie Solley arrived in Greece. The delegates split into two groups, with Solley and Tiffany going to Patras then speaking at the May Day demonstration back in Athens and Dodds and Pym going to Thessaloniki to speak at the May Day demonstration and visit villages in the surrounding area. Throughout their travels the delegates visited trade unions, jails, and politicians of the left and the center such as Ioannis Sofianopoulos. Describing the delegation's visit to the House of Commons, Leslie Solley said that "We were the guests of the Greek people; we met persons of our own class. Wherever we went we were received by deputations of trade unionists, deputations from cooperatives, deputations of agrarians, deputations of professional men, and we were able to come to grips with the Greek scene..."

Upon their return, the delegates published a pamphlet entitled Tragedy in Greece relaying their experiences in Greece and their worries for the political future of the country. The pamphlet was widely circulated, and between its two printings sold over 40,000 copies.

== Archives ==
In 1977, by a decision of the Executive Committee, the archives of the League for Democracy in Greece were donated to the Byzantine and Modern Greek Studies at King's College London. They are currently held at the Liddell Hart Centre for Military Archives.
