= James Wellbeloved =

British politician (1926–2012)

Under-Secretary of State for the Air Force
- In office 14 April 1976 – 6 May 1979
- Monarch: Elizabeth II
- Prime Minister: James Callaghan
- Preceded by: Brynmor John
- Succeeded by: Geoffrey Pattie

Member of Parliament for Erith and Crayford
- In office 11 November 1965 – 13 May 1983
- Preceded by: Norman Dodds
- Succeeded by: David Evennett

Personal details
- Born: Alfred James Wellbeloved; 29 July 1926 Lewisham, London, England
- Died: 10 September 2012 (aged 86) Bexley, London, England
- Party: Labour (1956–1981; after 1987)
- Other political affiliations: SDP (1981–1987)
- Spouse: Mavis Radcliff (m. 1948)
- Children: 3

Alfred James Wellbeloved (29 July 1926 – 10 September 2012) was a British politician who was the MP for Erith and Crayford from 1965 to 1983. He was elected as a member of the Labour Party, but defected to the Social Democratic Party after its formation in 1981.

== Early life and career ==
Wellbeloved was born in Lewisham in 1926. He was a boy seaman in the Royal Navy during World War II. After the war, he attended South London Technical College, and worked in the building and appliance industries, becoming active as a union officer. He married Mavis Radcliff in 1948, and they had three children.

Wellbeloved served as a councillor on Erith Borough Council from 1956, and was the first leader of the London Borough of Bexley from 1964.

== Member of Parliament ==
He was elected Labour Party Member of Parliament (MP) for Erith and Crayford at a 1965 by-election following the death of Norman Dodds, whose constituency chairman he had been.

In 1970, there was a discussion in the House of Commons as to whether to continue the practice of the rum ration, now known as the "Great Rum Debate". Wellbeloved argued in favour of continuing the practice.

Wellbeloved served successively as parliamentary private secretary (PPS) to Defence Minister Gerry Reynolds and Foreign Secretary Michael Stewart, and was under-secretary of state for the Air Force in the Callaghan government.

In 1981, Wellbeloved was among the Labour MPs who defected to the Social Democratic Party. At the 1983 general election, he lost his seat by just 920 votes to the Conservative David Evennett. He later rejoined the Labour Party.

Wellbeloved was known for his brusque, uncompromising personality, leading some colleagues to remark upon his surname with irony.

== Later life ==
After leaving parliament, Wellbeloved served on the boards of organ donation groups. He died in Bexley on 10 September 2012, at the age of 86.

== Sources ==
- Times Guide to the House of Commons, 1966 & 1983
- Leigh Rayment's Historical List of MPs

Parliament of the United Kingdom
Preceded by Norman Dodds	Member of Parliament for Erith and Crayford; 1965–1983	Succeeded by David Evennett
