= Chillaton =

Village in Devon, England

- Village
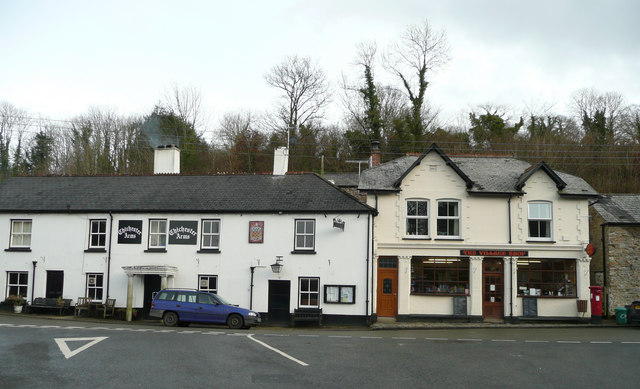
- Village pub and shop

- Location within Devon Location within the United Kingdom
- Coordinates: 50.615625°N 4.216089°W
- Country: England
- County: Devon

Population (2011)
  - Total: 1,617
- Time zone: UTC+0:00 (GST)

Chillaton is a village in the county of Devon, England, about 6 miles north of Tavistock. It is on the western edge of the Dartmoor National Park. The village is part of the electoral ward of Milton Ford. Its population at the 2011 census was 1,617.
