= Fanny by Gaslight =

Fanny by Gaslight may be:

- Fanny by Gaslight (novel), novel by Michael Sadleir
- Fanny by Gaslight (film), a 1944 film adaptation
- Fanny by Gaslight (TV series), a 1981 BBC adaptation
