= Jean Henderson =

British politician (1899–1997)

Jean Mary Henderson
- Born: 18 December 1899
- Died: 1 April 1997 (aged 97)
- Education: The Mount School, York, Bedford College, London University
- Occupations: Barrister, Liberal Party politician
- Political party: Liberal Party
- Parent(s): John and Florence Henderson

Jean Mary Henderson (18 December 1899 – 1 April 1997) was a British barrister and Liberal Party politician.

== Date of birth ==
Jean Mary Henderson was born on 18 December 1899, but her birth was not registered until the New Year, so appears in the Civil Registration Birth Index for the first quarter of 1900.

== Family ==
Henderson was the daughter of John and Florence Henderson. Her father was Secretary of the National Liberal Club for twenty years and formerly worked in the Liberal Party publications department. Her mother taught scripture at Hall School, Weybridge. In religion her mother was a Quaker and her father a lapsed Presbyterian. She had one sister. She never married.

== Education ==
Henderson started her education at Hall School, which has been described as an innovative and experimental establishment. The school was run by her aunt, Eva Gilpin (later Lady Sadler, wife of Sir Michael Sadler, Master of University College, Oxford). In 1949 Henderson co-edited a book about the school called Miss Gilpin and the Hall School: A Record of Adventure and Achievement in Education (Bannisdale Press, London) and in 1988 she published another exploration of the school, A Lasting Spring: Miss Gilpin and the Hall School, Weybridge 1898–1934 (William Sessions, York). After the Hall School, Henderson went to The Mount School, York, a Quaker establishment.

Henderson then went up to Bedford College, London University, where she graduated in modern languages (French, German and Russian).

== Career ==
On leaving university, Henderson first went to work in journalism, joining the foreign desk of the Westminster Gazette. She then transferred to The Daily News, another Liberal newspaper. She also edited a magazine for the anti-war Women's International League and acted as part-time secretary to David Low the famous cartoonist.

In 1938, after the death of her parents, Henderson changed careers and went in for the law. She was admitted to the Inner Temple in 1940 and called to the Bar in 1943. She then practised as a barrister on the London and Midland Circuits. She sat as an independent member of five Industrial Wages Councils and was Head of Chambers, 5 Pump Court Chambers, Temple, from 1970 to 1979. She also sat as a Justice of the Peace at Willesden.

== Politics ==
Jean Henderson was strongly influenced by her parents. She followed her father's politics and supported the Liberal Party all her life but she was independent and determined enough to choose her own political beliefs and causes. She fought three general elections for the Liberals, all without success. Her first intervention was as prospective parliamentary candidate for St Albans from 1936 until 1941 but no election occurred during that period. During World War Two, Henderson lectured on current events to troops under the War Office Scheme for Education and also served as an air raid warden in Hampstead Garden Suburb. In 1941, Henderson was one of the prominent women speakers at a rally in Trafalgar Square, attended by over two thousand people, to protest at the unequal treatment of women in compensation for injuries received in air raids. Under the regulations of the time women received 7 shillings a week less than male civilians for the same injuries even though they faced equal danger in their homes, as targets in industry or working in civil defence. Among the other speakers were Lady Astor, Edith Summerskill and the pianist Harriet Cohen.

At the 1945 general election Henderson stood as Liberal candidate for Barnet. This was won by the Labour by 682 votes, and she lost her deposit. In 1950 Henderson switched her attentions to Lincoln, this time with even less success, taking less than 9% of the vote and again losing her deposit. She did not contest a seat at the 1951 general election but she returned to the fray, first by becoming prospective parliamentary candidate for Watford in 1953 but then changing constituencies to fight at Luton in 1955. Again she came third and again she lost her deposit.

Henderson tried her hand at local elections too. She contested Hendon Borough Council elections in Garden Suburb Ward in 1949 and 1953 but did not get elected. In 1964 she was a Liberal candidate for Hampstead Garden Suburb in the Barnet London Borough Council elections. The Liberal candidates comfortably out-polled Labour and finished strong runners up to the Conservatives. She was Honorary Secretary of the Women's Liberal Federation from 1941 until 1949 and served on the Executive of the Liberal Candidates' Association. She was President of Hampstead Garden Suburb Ward Liberal Association and a member of the management board of the Gladstone Benevolent Fund for Liberal Agents, (1973–1988).

== Saving Hampstead Garden Suburb ==
In 1962 the Hampstead Garden Suburb Protection Society was set up with the aim of preserving the essential character and independence of the area in the face possible changes and development when the area was acquired by a private property company. Henderson was elected the first chairman. The membership of the Society grew to around 3,000 and they were able to sponsor a private bill in Parliament to safeguard the future of the suburb. In 1968, Henderson became one of the first directors of the New Hampstead Garden Suburb Trust, which was granted powers to refuse proposed developments in the area which they believed were harmful to its character.

== Papers ==
A substantial collection of Jean Henderson's papers covering her political work during the years 1916–1993, have been deposited in the LSE Library. There is also material relating to her legal career between 1938 and 1993.
