= Henry Gilpin =

Henry Gilpin may refer to:

- Harry Gilpin (1876–1950), British politician and company director
- Henry D. Gilpin (1801–1860), American attorney general
