= Jim Lester (British politician) =

British politician (1932–2021)

Member of Parliament for Broxtowe Beeston (1974–1983)
- In office 28 February 1974 – 8 April 1997
- Preceded by: Constituency established
- Succeeded by: Nick Palmer

Personal details
- Born: 23 May 1932 Nottingham. Nottinghamshire, England
- Died: 31 October 2021 (aged 89)
- Party: Conservative

Sir James Theodore Lester (23 May 1932 – 31 October 2021) was a British Conservative Party politician.

== Parliamentary career ==
Born in Nottingham on 23 May 1932, Lester attended Nottingham High School and, following National Service, was employed as the managing director of his family's leather firm. His father Arthur was a Labour Party alderman on Nottinghamshire County Council.

Lester was elected to serve on Bingham Town Council in 1964, and three years later he won a seat as a Conservative on Nottinghamshire County Council, where he chaired the council's finance committee (his father, representing the opposition Labour Party, was his deputy on the committee).

Lester first stood for Parliament in a by-election at Bassetlaw in 1968, when he almost overturned a Labour majority of 10,428 votes, failing to beat Joe Ashton by just 740 votes. He contested the seat again at the 1970 general election, but Ashton stretched his advantage to 8,261 votes.

He was member of parliament (MP) for Beeston between February 1974 and 1983, then for Broxtowe until the 1997 election, when he lost his seat to Labour. During his time in the House of Commons, he served as a party whip and junior employment minister. He was considered to be a Tory 'wet' – i.e., on the liberal wing of the party – and criticised the Thatcher Government's proposals for a Community Charge and unemployment benefit cuts.

Lester was noted for his relatively classless image, retaining his Nottinghamshire accent and supporting Nottingham Forest at football. He died on 31 October 2021, at the age of 89.

Parliament of the United Kingdom
New constituency	Member of Parliament for Beeston; Feb. 1974–1983	Constituency abolished
New constituency	Member of Parliament for Broxtowe; 1983–1997	Succeeded by Nick Palmer
