= Chloe Salaman =

English actress

- Born: Chloe M. S. Salaman; 1952 (age 73–74); Worthing, West Sussex
- Occupation: Actress
- Spouse: Charles D Burton (m. 1990)

Chloe Salaman (born 1952) is an English film and television actress.

== Career ==
She has appeared in several films and various television productions, including as Princess Elspeth in fantasy film Dragonslayer and as Sarah Churchill in Winston Churchill: The Wilderness Years (both 1981), an eight-part television miniseries. In the same year she took the leading role as Fanny Hooper in BBC television miniseries Fanny by Gaslight, based on the 1940 novel of the same name by Michael Sadleir. In 1990 she appeared in the Poirot episode "The Cornish Mystery".

== Personal life ==
Salaman lives in West Sussex, England.
