= Charles Simeons =

British politician (1921–2014)

Charles Simeons DL

Member of Parliament for Luton
- In office 18 June 1970 – 8 February 1974
- Preceded by: Will Howie
- Succeeded by: Constituency abolished

Personal details
- Born: Charles Fitzmaurice Creighton Simeons; 22 September 1921
- Died: 3 August 2014 (aged 92)
- Party: Conservative
- Spouses: Rosemary Tabrum (m. 1945; died 1991) Constance Dowson (m. 1991)
- Children: 2
- Education: Oundle School
- Alma mater: Queens' College, Cambridge

Charles Fitzmaurice Creighton Simeons DL (22 September 1921 – 3 August 2014) was a British Conservative Party politician and pollution control consultant.

== Early life and career ==
Simeons was born in 1921, the son of Charles and Vera Simeons. He was educated at Oundle School and Queens' College, Cambridge, where he boxed and won an athletics blue. During the Second World War he joined the 52nd Field Regiment of the Royal Artillery, serving with the 8th Indian Division in the Middle East and at the headquarters of North-East Africa Command, prior to being demobilised as a major in 1946. Before his election to parliament in 1970 he was the managing director of British Gelatine, which supplied products and materials for the photographic industry from its base in Luton.

== Political career ==
On his third attempt, Simeons was elected member of parliament for Luton at the 1970 general election, defeating the sitting Labour MP, William Howie. He served only one term: when the seat was divided in boundary changes for the February 1974 general election, he stood in the new Luton East seat but lost to Labour's Ivor Clemitson.

While in parliament Simeons became known for his attention to local issues, campaigning on behalf of managers at the Vauxhall factory in his constituency and firmly opposing plans to expand Luton Airport. The Daily Telegraph was later to describe him as "robust on law and order, calling for muggers - and dumpers of toxic waste - to be put in the stocks; he also vocally opposed enforced comprehensive education. But he was otherwise on the Left of the party, backing Heath on Common Market membership and earning the censure of the Monday Club."

== Later life and death ==
After Simeons left the House of Commons he became an expert on pollution control, especially where it concerned water pollution and chemical spills, and wrote several books on these subjects. He was Director of the Action Learning Trust from 1978 to 1982.

Simeons was married twice, firstly to Rosemary Tabrum (with whom he had two children) and then, after her death in 1991, to Constance Dowson. He died aged 92 in 2014.

Parliament of the United Kingdom
Preceded by Will Howie	Member of Parliament for Luton; 1970–Feb 1974	Constituency abolished
