= Forlorn Sunset =

1947 novel by Michael Sadleir

- First UK edition (publ. Constable & Co.); Cover art by John Piper
- Author: Michael Sadleir
- Publisher: Farrar, Straus & Giroux
- Publication date: October 29, 1946

Forlorn Sunset is a novel by the British writer Michael Sadleir which was first published in 1947. Like his better known work Fanny by Gaslight the novel is set in Victorian London and explores the underworld of Vice that existed in the city.
