= Luton East =

UK Parliament constituency (1974–1983)

- Former borough constituency for the House of Commons
- Boundary of Luton East in Bedfordshire, boundaries 1974-83
- County: Bedfordshire
- Major settlements: Luton

1974–1983
- Seats: One
- Created from: Luton
- Replaced by: Luton North and Luton South

Luton East was a United Kingdom Parliamentary constituency. It was created in 1974 from the bulk of abolished Luton constituency. It was abolished in 1983 when it was absorbed into the new Borough Constituency of Luton South.

== Boundaries ==
The County Borough of Luton wards of Central, Crawley, High Town, South, Stopsley, and Wardown.

== Members of Parliament ==
Election	Member	Party
Feb 1974	Ivor Clemitson	Labour
1979	Graham Bright	Conservative
1983	Constituency abolished	

== Elections ==
General election February 1974: Luton East
Party	Candidate	Votes	%	±%
Labour	Ivor Clemitson	17,137	40.15	
Conservative	Charles Simeons	15,712	36.81	
Liberal	J Fisher	9,680	22.68	
Independent	Jitendra Bard	155	0.36	
Majority		1,425	3.34	
Turnout		42,684	80.47	
Labour win (new seat)				

General election October 1974: Luton East
Party	Candidate	Votes	%	±%
Labour	Ivor Clemitson	17,877	45.46	
Conservative	Arthur Johnston	14,200	36.11	
Liberal	J Fisher	6,947	17.67	
Irish Civil Rights Association	L Byrne	299	0.76	New
Majority		3,677	9.35	
Turnout		39,323	73.43	
Labour hold		Swing		

General election 1979: Luton East
Party	Candidate	Votes	%	±%
Conservative	Graham Bright	17,809	43.72	
Labour	Ivor Clemitson	16,962	41.64	
Liberal	David Franks	5,285	12.98	
National Front	MG Kerry	461	1.13	New
Communist	Clayton Mitchell	107	0.26	New
Committee for the Prevention of a Police State	Jitendra Bardwaj	61	0.15	New
Workers Revolutionary	Arthur Lynn	45	0.11	New
Majority		847	2.08	N/A
Turnout		40,730	77.69	
Conservative gain from Labour		Swing		

== See also ==
- List of former United Kingdom Parliament constituencies
