= Graham Bright =

British politician and businessman (1942–2024)

Sir Graham Bright
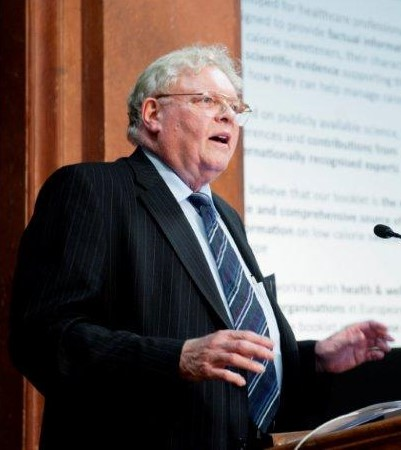
- Bright in 2011

Cambridgeshire Police and Crime Commissioner
- In office 22 November 2012 – 11 May 2016
- Preceded by: Office created
- Succeeded by: Jason Ablewhite

Member of Parliament for Luton South Luton East (1979–1983)
- In office 3 May 1979 – 8 April 1997
- Preceded by: Ivor Clemitson
- Succeeded by: Margaret Moran

Personal details
- Born: 2 April 1942 Horndon-on-the-Hill, Essex, England
- Died: 19 January 2024 (aged 81) Cambridge, Cambridgeshire, England
- Party: Conservative
- Spouse: Valerie Bright
- Children: Dr Rupert Bright

Sir Graham Frank James Bright (2 April 1942 – 19 January 2024) was a British politician and businessman. A member of the Conservative Party, he served as a Member of Parliament (MP) from 1979 to 1997. He subsequently served as the Cambridgeshire Police and Crime Commissioner from 2012 to 2016.

== Political career ==
An active Young Conservative, he cut his political teeth as a member of Thurrock Borough Council from 1965–79, and of Essex County Council from 1967–70. He stood unsuccessfully for Parliament in 1970 and 1974 in Thurrock, and in Dartford at the second general election of 1974, before being elected in Luton East in 1979. Following constituency boundary changes, he transferred to Luton South at the 1983 general election, holding the seat until his defeat at the 1997 general election by Labour's Margaret Moran.

During his time in Parliament, Bright served as a parliamentary private secretary (PPS) to various members of the Cabinet for 18 years, most notably to John Major for his first four years as Prime Minister (1990–94). Bright then went on to serve as a Vice-Chairman of the Conservative Party from 1994–97. He received a knighthood in 1994.

Bright introduced two private member's bills to the House of Commons which became law. The first, introduced in 1983 was passed as the Video Recordings Act 1984 that required all commercial video recordings offered for sale or for hire within the UK to carry a classification. Bright supported the abolition of caning in UK schools in 1986.

The second, introduced in 1990 was the often referred to as the "Acid House [parties] Bill" became the Entertainments (Increased Penalties) Act 1990. In material relating to his candidature for Cambridgeshire's Police and Crime Commissioner Bright has described these Bills as being "aimed at protecting young people."

In September 2012 Bright was selected by the Conservative party to be their candidate in the election for Cambridgeshire's Police and Crime Commissioner. He won the election in November that year, and appointed his Party and business colleague Brian Ashton as his deputy which was criticised as potential favouritism. In December 2012, Bright called for a crackdown on "anti-social" and "dangerous" cyclists. In November 2013 he said that bicycle helmets should be compulsory.

== Outside politics ==
Until he was 15, Bright was educated at Hassenbrook Secondary Modern School in Stanford-le-Hope. He later took courses at Thurrock Technical College. Outside politics, he worked as a marketing executive, factory manager and company director. He was chairman and chief executive of Dietary Foods Ltd for over 30 years.

Bright died on 19 January 2024, at the age of 81.

== Notes ==
Parliament of the United Kingdom
Preceded by Ivor Clemitson	Member of Parliament for Luton East; 1979–1983	Constituency abolished
New constituency	Member of Parliament for Luton South; 1983–1997	Succeeded by Margaret Moran
Government offices
Preceded by Peter Morrison	Parliamentary Private Secretary to the Prime Minister; 1990–1994	Succeeded by John Ward
