= Seymour Cocks =

British politician (1882–1953)

Seymour Cocks CBE MP
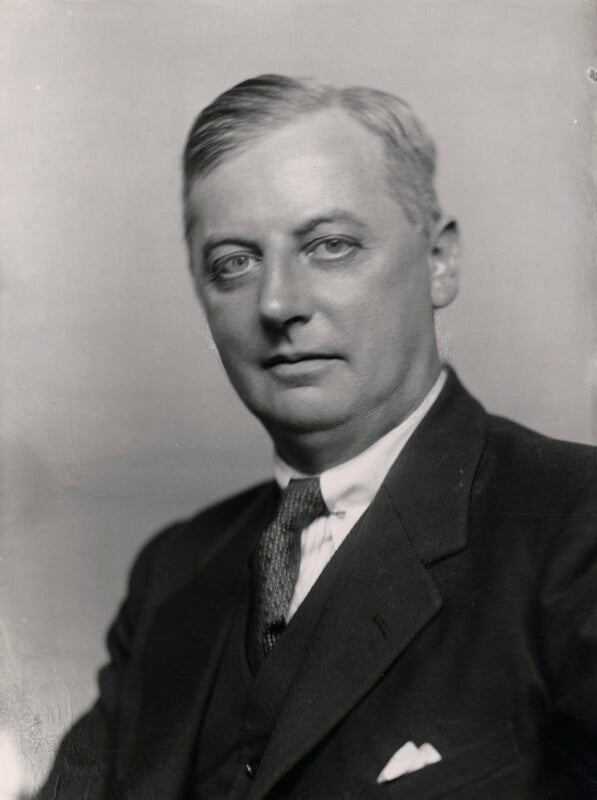
- Cocks in 1942

Member of Parliament of the United Kingdom
- In office 30 May 1929 – 29 May 1953
- Preceded by: George Spencer
- Succeeded by: William Warbey
- Constituency: Broxtowe

Personal details
- Born: Frederick Seymour Cocks; 25 October 1882 Darlington, County Durham, England, UK
- Died: 29 May 1953 (aged 70) Hendon
- Party: Labour
- Other political affiliations: Independent Labour Party

External image
- Photographic portrait of Cocks in the National Portrait Gallery, London. Taken by Walter Stoneman, 13 January 1950.

Frederick Seymour Cocks CBE (25 October 1882 – 29 May 1953) was a British Labour MP.

Born in Darlington, Cocks was educated at Plymouth College and became a journalist. He joined the Independent Labour Party and wrote several tracts for the party and for the Union of Democratic Control. He stood unsuccessfully for Maidstone at the 1923 general election. He was elected to the safe seat of Broxtowe at the 1929 general election.

After World War II, it was revealed that he had been placed on the 'Special Search List G.B' of prominent subjects to be arrested by the Nazis had they succeeded in invading Britain. He was the author of a biography of fellow Labour Party member E. D. Morel, E.D. Morel, The Man and his work.

Cocks remained as the MP for Broxtowe until his death in 1953, aged 70.

== Sources ==
- Leigh Rayment's Historical List of MPs

Parliament of the United Kingdom
Preceded by George Alfred Spencer	Member of Parliament for Broxtowe; 1929 – 1953	Succeeded by William Warbey
