= George Julian Selwyn Scovell =

British soldier and politician

Lt-Col. George Julian Selwyn Scovell CBE (April 1881 – 16 April 1948), was a British Soldier and Liberal Party politician.

== Background ==
Scovell was born the eldest surviving son of Capt. G.T. Scovell. He was educated at the Haileybury and Imperial Service College and the Royal Military College, Sandhurst, and never married. He was appointed a CBE in 1919.

== Professional career ==
Scovell served South African War, 1901–02. He was on the General Staff, Northern Command, York, 1914–16; Assistant Adjutant-General, War Office, 1916–17; Deputy Director-General of Recruiting, Ministry of National Service, 1917–18.

== Political career ==
Scovell was a Liberal who aligned himself with Prime Minister David Lloyd George and his Coalition Government. In 1919 he became General Secretary of Lloyd George's Coalition Liberal organisation, helping to bring into existence the National Liberal Party. In 1923 the two Liberal parties merged back together again and Scovell became Liberal candidate for the Broxtowe division at the 1923 General Election. He was unsuccessful and did not stand for parliament again.

=== Electoral record ===
General Election 1923: Broxtowe
Party	Candidate	Votes	%	±%
Labour	George Alfred Spencer	13,219	54.5	+3.7
Liberal	George Julian Selwyn Scovell	11,049	45.5	−3.7
Majority		2,170	9.0	+7.4
Turnout			62.0	+2.2
Labour hold		Swing	+3.7	
