= William Warbey =

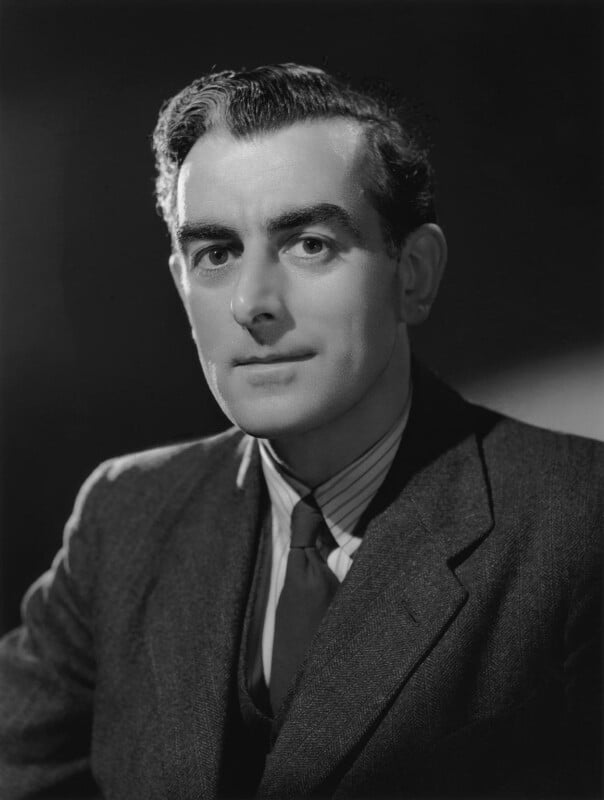
- Warbey in 1947

Member of Parliament
- In office 17 September 1953 – 10 March 1966
- Preceded by: Seymour Cocks
- Succeeded by: David Marquand
- Constituency: Broxtowe (1953–1955); Ashfield (1955–1966)
- In office 5 July 1945 – 3 February 1950
- Preceded by: Leslie Burgin
- Succeeded by: Charles Hill
- Constituency: Luton

Personal details
- Born: 16 August 1903 Hackney, London, England
- Died: 6 May 1980 (aged 76) Eastbourne, East Sussex, England
- Party: Labour
- Spouse: Audrey Wicks (m. 1931)

William Noble Warbey (16 August 1903 – 6 May 1980) was a Labour Party politician in the United Kingdom.

He was born in the then newly created Metropolitan Borough of Hackney in London, and was educated at Hackney Downs School, King's College London and the London School of Economics. As a young man he was an interpreter in France and Germany, a secondary school teacher in Derby, and a tutor at the University Tutorial College in London. He first entered the House of Commons at the 1945 general election, as the Member of Parliament for Luton in Bedfordshire. However, at the 1950 general election, he lost his seat to the Conservative Party candidate Charles Hill, the former "radio doctor".

Warbey re-entered Parliament at a 1953 by-election for the Nottinghamshire constituency of Broxtowe, following the death of sitting Labour MP Seymour Cocks. However, that constituency was abolished for the 1955 general election, at which Warbey was returned for the new Ashfield constituency. He held the seat until his retirement at the 1966 general election.Thereafter, he was employed as Executive Director of the Organisation for World Political and Social Studies.

He was known for his strong opposition to British support for the United States in the Vietnam War, resigning the Labour whip in protest in September 1965, and "subsequently wrote a scathing book about [Harold] Wilson's support for the United States" entitled Vietnam: The Truth. He was also a strong European federalist, setting up the Socialist Europe Group in July 1948.

He died in Eastbourne aged 76.

== Sources ==
- Leigh Rayment's Historical List of MPs

Parliament of the United Kingdom
Preceded by Leslie Burgin	Member of Parliament for Luton; 1945–1950	Succeeded by Charles Hill
Preceded by Seymour Cocks	Member of Parliament for Broxtowe; 1953–1955	Constituency abolished
New constituency	Member of Parliament for Ashfield; 1955–1966	Succeeded by David Marquand
