= Robert Lusty =

British journalist and publisher

Sir Robert Frith Lusty (7 June 1909 – 23 July 1991) was a British journalist and publisher.

Robert Lusty was born in Cheltenham and educated by the Society of Friends at Sidcot School. He became an apprentice reporter at the Kent Messenger in 1927 but was forced to resign because of heart problems. In 1928 he was taken on by Walter Hutchinson, the publisher. He learned the trade so well that in 1933 he was appointed manager of the associated company Selwyn & Blount. In 1935 he left to join Michael Joseph Ltd at its foundation by Michael Joseph and rose to the post of Deputy Chairman. In 1956 he returned to Hutchinson as Managing Director and remained there until his retirement in 1973.

Lusty was a Governor of the BBC from 1960 to 1968 and was briefly Acting Chairman before the full-time appointment of Lord Hill of Luton. He was knighted in 1969.

He married Joan Christie Brownlie in 1939 (who died in 1962) and Eileen, the widow of Dennis Carroll, in 1963.

== Works ==
- Bound to be Read, Cape, 1975. ISBN 0-224-01171-5. Lusty's autobiography.
