= Frederick Bellenger =

British politician (1894–1968)

Captain The Right Honourable Frederick Bellenger MP
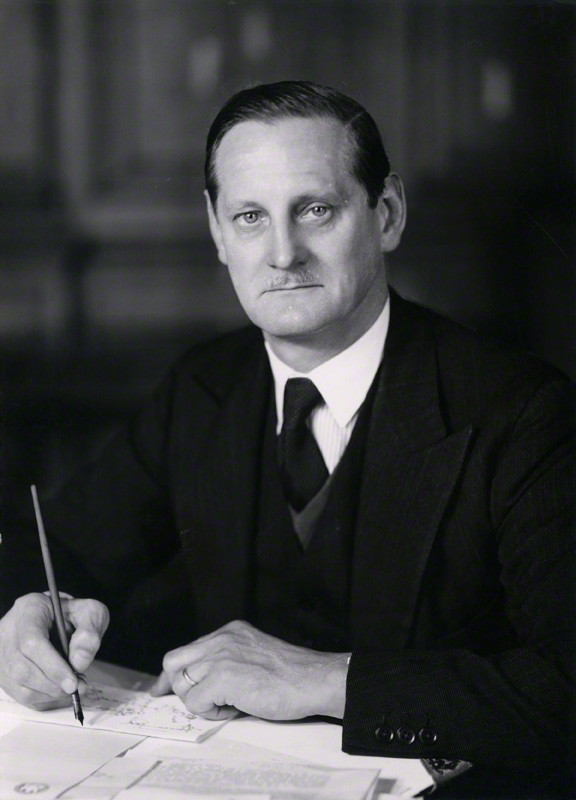
- Bellenger in 1942

Secretary of State for War
- In office 4 October 1946 – 7 October 1947
- Monarch: George VI
- Prime Minister: Clement Attlee
- Preceded by: Jack Lawson
- Succeeded by: Manny Shinwell

Member of Parliament for Bassetlaw
- In office 14 November 1935 – 11 May 1968
- Preceded by: Malcolm MacDonald
- Succeeded by: Joe Ashton

Personal details
- Born: 23 July 1894 Bethnal Green, London
- Died: 11 May 1968 (aged 73) Kensington, London
- Party: Labour

Captain Frederick John Bellenger (23 July 1894 – 11 May 1968) was a British surveyor, soldier and politician.

== Early life ==
Born in Bethnal Green, London, he was the son of Eugene Bernard Bellenger, a dairyman, and his wife Isabella Annette née Henner. He received only an elementary education before starting work aged 14. He worked in various jobs: in a tea warehouse in Houndsditch, as a messenger boy for the Post Office and as a clerk to an export company in the City of London.

== World War I ==
With the outbreak of the First World War in August 1914, Bellenger volunteered to join the British Army. He became a gunner in the Royal Field Artillery, arriving at the Western Front in the following year. He was twice wounded, and rose through the ranks, being commissioned as a second lieutenant in 1917. Following the armistice in November 1918, he served in the forces occupying the Rhineland. He was demobilised in 1919.

In Cologne he had met Marion Theresa Stollwerck, daughter of Generalkonsul Karl Stollwerck, a wealthy German chocolate manufacturer; the couple married in 1922. They had five sons and one daughter.

== Early political career ==
Following the war, Bellenger worked as a surveyor and estate agent in west London. He became active in the local Conservative Association, and was elected to Fulham Borough Council as a Municipal Reform Party councillor representing Baron's Court ward in 1922 and 1925. He did not stand for election in 1928, and shortly afterwards joined the Labour Party.

In June 1930, Bellenger was selected by the Labour Party as their prospective parliamentary candidate at Bethnal Green South West, but withdrew his candidature a year later on health grounds. When the Labour Party split over the formation of a National Government in August 1931, he remained with the majority faction opposing the move.

In November 1933, he was chosen to contest Bassetlaw in Nottinghamshire, a seat held by Malcolm MacDonald of the National Labour Organisation and son of its leader, Ramsay MacDonald, a long-serving Secretary of State in the coalition National Government and first Labour Prime Minister. At the 1935 general election Bellenger gained the seat for Labour, and held it comfortably at each election until his death.

== World War II ==
Bellenger remained in the army's emergency reserve, and when the Second World War broke out in 1939 he was automatically recalled to service. He was commissioned as a captain in the Royal Artillery in February 1940. He went to France as a staff officer in April of that year as part of the British Expeditionary Force. He returned to the United Kingdom briefly in May to take part in the Norway Debate in the Commons that led to the fall of Neville Chamberlain's government. Evacuated from France in June 1940, two months later he resigned his commission. Apart from his parliamentary activities, Bellenger wrote a column for the Sunday Pictorial under the byline "Voice of the Services".

== Attlee government ==
When the Labour Party returned to government with a landslide at the 1945 general election, Bellenger was appointed Financial Secretary to the War Office. In October 1946, he became Secretary of State for War. Although not a cabinet position he was appointed a Privy Counsellor at the same time. He proved an unpopular minister with Labour backbenchers, and was attacked by those on the left of the party. It came as no surprise when he was removed from office at a ministerial reshuffle in October 1947.

== Later life ==
Bellenger remained on the Labour backbenches for the rest of his life. He became increasingly disconnected from the mainstream of the party, being unsympathetic to trade unions, opposing the decriminalisation of homosexuality and supported the Unilateral Declaration of Independence by white Rhodesians. He was close to members of the Conservative Party, including their Chief Whip Martin Redmayne and, against the arguments of his dining companion, Margaret Thatcher, privately supported the retention of prime minister Harold Macmillan at the time of the Profumo scandal in 1963 along with Julian Critchley, another of his Conservative friends. Following the 1966 general election, the Bassetlaw Constituency Labour Party deselected him (for any future election) over his opposition to steel nationalisation and his position on Rhodesia.

Bellenger was still Bassetlaw's MP when he died at his Kensington, London, home in May 1968, aged 73. He had received the honorary freedom of the Borough of Worksop two days earlier.

Parliament of the United Kingdom
Preceded by Malcolm MacDonald	Member of Parliament for Bassetlaw; 1935–1968	Succeeded by Joe Ashton
Political offices
Preceded by Maurice Petherick	Financial Secretary to the War Office; 1945–1946	Succeeded by John Freeman
Preceded by Jack Lawson	Secretary of State for War; 1946–1947	Succeeded by Manny Shinwell
