= Stuart Lindsell =

English actor (1892–1969)

Stuart Lindsell in Passport to Pimlico (1949)

Reginald Stuart Lindsell (18 July 1892, Biggleswade, Bedfordshire – 9 July 1969, London) was a British actor, often seen in upper-class roles. He was sometimes credited as R. Stuart Lindsell.

He also served as an officer in the Middlesex Regiment of the British Army, having been commissioned in September 1911 after attending the Royal Military College, Sandhurst.

== Filmography ==
Year	Title	Role	Notes
1942	Hatter's Castle	Lord Winton	
1942	The Day Will Dawn	Reporter	Uncredited
1942	Uncensored	Press Officer	
1942	The Young Mr. Pitt	Earl Spencer	
1943	The Man in Grey	Thomas Lawrence	Uncredited
1944	Fanny by Gaslight	Clive Seymour	
1945	The Man from Morocco	Colonel Appleby	
1946	Night Boat to Dublin	Inspector Martin	
1948	Escape	Sir James Winton	
1948	My Brother Jonathan	Mr. Martyn	
1948	Broken Journey	Mr. Barber	
1948	Bonnie Prince Charlie	MacDonald of Armadale	
1949	Once a Jolly Swagman	Mr. Yates	
1949	The Blue Lagoon	Yacht owner	
1949	Passport to Pimlico	Coroner	
1949	Man on the Run	Elliett	
1949	Christopher Columbus	Prior	
1950	The Girl Who Couldn't Quite	John	
1950	Once a Sinner	Inspector Rance	
1950	Lilli Marlene	Major Phillips	
1951	High Treason	Commissioner	
1953	Flannelfoot	Lord Wexford	
1954	West of Zanzibar	Colonel Ryan	
1954	Profile	Aubrey	
