= 1968 Bassetlaw by-election =

UK parliamentary by-election

The 1968 Bassetlaw by-election was a parliamentary by-election for the constituency of Bassetlaw held on 31 October 1968. It was caused by the death of the former Labour Member of Parliament, Fred Bellenger.

The Labour candidate, Joe Ashton, was a Sheffield city councillor. His Conservative opponent was Jim Lester, a Nottingham businessman. The Liberal party decided against contesting the seat for financial reasons. There was one independent, Tom Lynch of the National Union of Small Shopkeepers, who campaigned for a coalition of all the parties and the end of the fivepenny post. He fell five times short of retaining his deposit (only doubly short since 1985).

Early reports suggested a low turnout was likely, due to voter disenchantment with the major parties, and Labour had some reason to fear its supporters staying away. Pit closures were an important issue in a seat with a large mining sector vote. Ashton argued that the Labour government's approach, which included redundancy payments to miners over the age of 55, was better than the approach of the Conservatives when they were in power. The other major issues were reported as taxes, prices, employment and education. Bellenger had had a majority at the last general election of 10,428. The seat would require a swing of 11.6 per cent at a time when opinion polls put the Conservatives 7.5 per cent ahead nationally. Conservatives had lately achieved comparable swings to 11.6% in by-elections in Nelson and Colne and Oldham West as economic conditions made the government very unpopular.

On the day, Labour retained the seat but the majority was slashed to 740 votes. Commentators suggested that although this was a bad result for Labour ("If Labour's grip on Bassetlaw, a bedrock citadel of theirs for 44 years, is reduced to a perilous hanging-on by the fingernails, they cannot fail to be unnerved") they could take hope from the fact that there was a better swing and result compared to earlier, more ominous, by-elections.

Bassetlaw by-election, 1968
| Party | Candidate | Votes | % | ±% |
|---|---|---|---|---|
| Labour | Joe Ashton | 21,394 | 49.64 | −11.99 |
| Conservative | Jim Lester | 20,654 | 47.92 | +9.55 |
| Independent | Tom Lynch | 1,053 | 2.44 | New |
| Majority | | 740 | 1.72 | −21.55 |
| Turnout | | 43,101 | 68.0 | −5.3 |
| Labour hold | | Swing | –10.77 | |
