= Luton (constituency) =

Parliamentary constituency in the United Kingdom, 1885–1974

- Former borough constituency for the House of Commons
- County: Bedfordshire
- Major settlements: Luton

1885–1974
- Seats: One
- Created from: Bedfordshire
- Replaced by: Luton East (Majority) and Luton West (Part)
- During its existence contributed to new seat(s) of: Mid Bedfordshire (1918); South Bedfordshire (1950)

Luton was a constituency including the town of Luton in Bedfordshire. It returned one Member of Parliament (MP) to the House of Commons of the UK Parliament from 1885 to 1974, elected by the first past the post system.

== History ==
The seat was created for the 1885 general election as one of two divisions of the county which succeeded Bedfordshire county constituency and was formally known as the Southern or Luton Division of Bedfordshire. The constituency adjoined the Northern or Biggleswade Division to the north of the county until 1918.

From the 1910s onwards the town of Luton and contiguous suburbs expanded, as recorded at the census in each decade, resulting in expanding electorates. This resulted in territory loss to newly formed seats in 1918 and 1950 and further population growth (coupled with a programme of new housing principally under the New Towns Act 1946) justified abolition and division into East and West seats in 1974.

=== Political summary ===
==== Before 1945 ====
The seat was Liberal-candidate held for 40 of the 46 years before 1931. The remaining six years had been won by Conservative and Unionist Party candidates, running under the emphasis of the party as 'Unionist'. In 1931, the sitting Liberal MP, Leslie Burgin, joined the Liberal Nationals (later the National Liberal Party).

==== After 1945 ====
In the election landslide of 1945, the seat was won by the Labour Party, but recaptured at the next election by Charles Hill who served as a National Liberal, in coalition with the Conservatives, from 1950 until 1963, when he was made a life peer (Baron Hill of Luton). The resulting by-election was won by Labour which held it until 1970 when it was taken by the Conservative Party until the seat was abolished for the February 1974 general election.

=== Electorate size ===
The electorate rose through house-building from a relatively modest 37,051 in 1918 to an over-sized (malapportioned) 95,227 in 1945.

In 1950 the electorate of the curtailed seat was 56,569; this rose to 62,457 in 1970, after which the seat was abolished, as recommended by the Boundary Commission, as set out in its Second Periodic Review of Westminster Constituencies.

== Boundaries and boundary changes ==
=== 1885–1918 ===
- The Sessional Divisions of Luton, Leighton Buzzard, and Woburn; and
- Part of the Sessional Division of Ampthill.

The constituency was created as the Southern or Luton Division of Bedfordshire under the Redistribution of Seats Act 1885, when the two-member Parliamentary County of Bedfordshire was divided into the two single-member constituencies of Biggleswade and Luton.

=== 1918–1950 ===
- The Boroughs of Luton and Dunstable; and
- The Rural District of Luton.

Northern and western parts of the Division, including Leighton Buzzard and surrounding rural areas, were transferred to the new Mid Bedfordshire Division.

=== 1950–1974 ===
- The Borough of Luton wards of Central, Crawley, Dallow, High Town, Icknield, Lewsey, South, Stopsley, Sundon Park, and Wardown.

The Leagrave and Limbury wards, together with the Borough of Dunstable and surrounding rural areas were included in the new constituency of South Bedfordshire. Reclassified as a borough constituency.

For the February 1974 general election the seat was abolished and was split into two new constituencies of Luton East and Luton West.

== Members of Parliament ==
Election	Member	Party	Notes
1885	Cyril Flower	Liberal	Member for Brecon (1880–1885)
1892 by-election	Samuel Whitbread	Liberal	
1895	Thomas Ashton	Liberal	
1911 by-election	Cecil Harmsworth	Liberal	
1916	Cecil Harmsworth	Coalition Liberal	
Jan 1922	Cecil Harmsworth	National Liberal	
1922	John Hewett	Unionist	
1923	Geoffrey Howard	Liberal	
1924	Terence O'Connor	Unionist	
1929	Leslie Burgin	Liberal	
1931	Leslie Burgin	National Liberal	
1945	William Warbey	Labour	
1950	Charles Hill	National Liberal and Conservative	Chancellor of the Duchy of Lancaster (1957–1961); Elevated to the peerage as Baron Hill in June 1963
1963 by-election	Will Howie	Labour	Comptroller of the Household (1967–1968)
1970	Charles Simeons	Conservative	Contested Luton East following redistribution
Feb 1974	constituency abolished: see Luton East and Luton West		

== Election results ==
=== Election results 1885–1918 ===
==== Elections in the 1880s ====
Gedge

General election 1885: Luton
Party	Candidate	Votes	%
Liberal	Cyril Flower	6,080	61.1
Conservative	Sydney Gedge	3,871	38.9
Majority		2,209	22.2
Turnout		9,951	82.2
Registered electors		12,106	
Liberal win (new seat)			

Flower was appointed a Lord Commissioner of the Treasury, requiring a by-election.

By-election, 13 Feb 1886: Luton
Party	Candidate	Votes	%	±%
Liberal	Cyril Flower	Unopposed		
Registered electors		12,106		
Liberal hold				

General election 1886: Luton
Party	Candidate	Votes	%	±%
Liberal	Cyril Flower	4,275	54.3	−6.8
Conservative	Walter Barttelot	3,602	45.7	+6.8
Majority		673	8.6	−13.6
Turnout		7,877	65.1	−17.1
Registered electors		12,106		
Liberal hold		Swing	−6.8	

==== Elections in the 1890s ====
General election 1892: Luton
Party	Candidate	Votes	%	±%
Liberal	Cyril Flower	5,296	55.3	+1.0
Liberal Unionist	Oliver Thomas Duke	4,277	44.7	−1.0
Majority		1,019	10.6	+2.0
Turnout		9,573	75.7	+10.6
Registered electors		12,642		
Liberal hold		Swing	+1.0	

Flower is elevated to the peerage as Lord Battersea.

1892 Luton by-election
Party	Candidate	Votes	%	±%
Liberal	Samuel Whitbread	4,838	51.3	−4.0
Liberal Unionist	Oliver Thomas Duke	4,596	48.7	+4.0
Majority		242	2.6	−8.0
Turnout		9,434	74.6	−1.1
Registered electors		12,642		
Liberal hold		Swing	−4.0	

Thomas Ashton

General election 1895: Luton
Party	Candidate	Votes	%	±%
Liberal	Thomas Ashton	5,430	50.9	−4.4
Liberal Unionist	Oliver Thomas Duke	5,244	49.1	+4.4
Majority		186	1.8	−8.8
Turnout		10,674	83.7	+8.0
Registered electors		12,760		
Liberal hold		Swing	−4.4	

==== Elections in the 1900s ====
General election 1900: Luton
Party	Candidate	Votes	%	±%
Liberal	Thomas Ashton	5,474	50.5	−0.4
Conservative	George Elliott	5,371	49.5	+0.4
Majority		103	1.0	−0.8
Turnout		10,845	81.4	−2.3
Registered electors		13,317		
Liberal hold		Swing	−0.4	

General election 1906: Luton
Party	Candidate	Votes	%	±%
Liberal	Thomas Ashton	7,240	57.3	+6.8
Conservative	Alfred Peter Hillier	5,387	42.7	−6.8
Majority		1,853	14.6	+13.6
Turnout		12,627	87.3	+5.9
Registered electors		14,459		
Liberal hold		Swing	+6.8	

==== Elections in the 1910s ====
General election January 1910: Luton
Party	Candidate	Votes	%	±%
Liberal	Thomas Ashton	7,946	52.9	−4.4
Liberal Unionist	George Elliott	7,080	47.1	+4.4
Majority		866	5.8	−8.8
Turnout		15,026	90.7	+3.4
Registered electors		16,564		
Liberal hold		Swing	−4.4	

General election December 1910: Luton
Party	Candidate	Votes	%	±%
Liberal	Thomas Ashton	7,601	53.4	+0.5
Conservative	John Owen Hickman	6,623	46.6	−0.5
Majority		978	6.8	+1.0
Turnout		14,224	85.9	−4.8
Registered electors		16,564		
Liberal hold		Swing	+0.5	

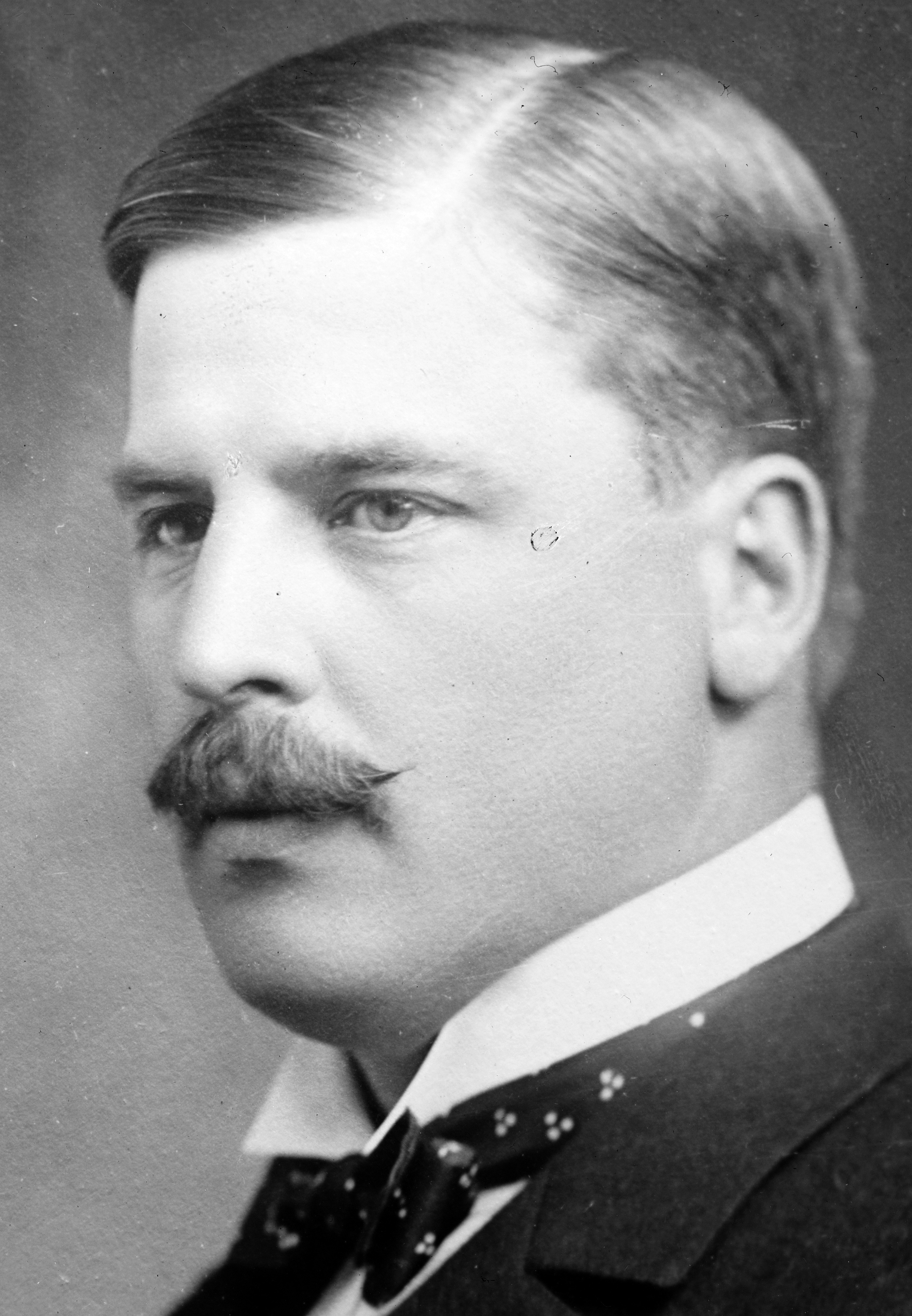
Harmsworth

1911 Luton by-election
Party	Candidate	Votes	%	±%
Liberal	Cecil Harmsworth	7,619	52.1	−1.3
Conservative	John Owen Hickman	7,006	47.9	+1.3
Majority		613	4.2	−2.6
Turnout		14,625	85.1	−0.8
Registered electors		17,177		
Liberal hold		Swing	−1.3	

General Election 1914–15:

Another General Election was required to take place before the end of 1915. The political parties had been making preparations for an election to take place from 1914 and by the end of this year, the following candidates had been selected;

- Liberal: Cecil Harmsworth
- Unionist: John Owen Hickman

=== Election results 1918–1950 ===
==== Elections in the 1910s ====
General election 1918: Luton
Party		Candidate	Votes	%
C	National Liberal	Cecil Harmsworth	13,501	69.4
	Labour	Willet Ball	5,964	30.6
Majority			7,537	38.8
Turnout			19,465	62.5
Registered electors			37,051	
	National Liberal win (new boundaries)			
C indicates candidate endorsed by the coalition government.

==== Elections in the 1920s ====
Percy Alden

General election 1922: Luton
Party	Candidate	Votes	%	±%
Unionist	John Hewett	13,301	43.5	New
Liberal	Harry Arnold	10,137	33.2	New
Labour	Percy Alden	7,107	23.3	−7.3
Majority		3,164	10.3	N/A
Turnout		30,545	81.0	+18.5
Registered electors		37,730		
Unionist gain from National Liberal		Swing	N/A	

Geoffrey Howard

General election 1923: Luton
Party	Candidate	Votes	%	±%
Liberal	Geoffrey Howard	15,569	51.4	+18.2
Unionist	John Hewett	11,738	38.7	−4.8
Labour	Willet Ball	2,998	9.9	−13.4
Majority		3,831	12.7	N/A
Turnout		30,305	78.1	−2.9
Registered electors		38,799		
Liberal gain from Unionist		Swing	+11.5	

General election 1924: Luton
Party	Candidate	Votes	%	±%
Unionist	Terence O'Connor	15,443	47.1	+8.4
Liberal	Geoffrey Howard	11,495	35.1	−16.3
Labour	Philip L Millwood	5,850	17.8	+7.9
Majority		3,948	12.0	N/A
Turnout		32,788	82.6	+4.5
Registered electors		39,701		
Unionist gain from Liberal		Swing		

General election 1929: Luton
Party	Candidate	Votes	%	±%
Liberal	Leslie Burgin	20,248	45.5	+10.4
Unionist	Terence O'Connor	16,930	38.0	−9.1
Labour	Florence Harrison Bell	7,351	16.5	−1.3
Majority		3,318	7.5	N/A
Turnout		44,529	81.5	−1.1
Registered electors		54,661		
Liberal gain from Unionist		Swing	+9.8	

==== Elections in the 1930s ====
General election 1931: Luton
Party	Candidate	Votes	%	±%
National Liberal	Leslie Burgin	32,015	80.2	+34.7
Labour	James H MacDonnell	7,897	19.8	+3.3
Majority		24,118	60.4	+52.9
Turnout		39,912	67.8	−13.7
Registered electors		58,880		
National Liberal hold		Swing		

General election 1935: Luton
Party	Candidate	Votes	%	±%
National Liberal	Leslie Burgin	28,809	65.5	−14.7
Labour	F. L. Kerran	15,181	34.5	+14.7
Majority		13,628	31.0	−29.4
Turnout		43,990	63.2	−4.6
Registered electors		69,548		
National Liberal hold		Swing		

==== Elections in the 1940s ====
General Election 1939–40: Another General Election was required to take place before the end of 1940. The political parties had been making preparations for an election to take place from 1939 and by the end of this year, the following candidates had been selected;

- Liberal National: Leslie Burgin
- Labour: F. L. Kerran

General election 1945: Luton
Party	Candidate	Votes	%	±%
Labour	William Warbey	39,335	55.2	+20.7
National Liberal	Bruno Brown	31,914	44.8	−20.7
Majority		7,421	10.4	N/A
Turnout		71,249	74.9	+11.7
Registered electors		95,227		
Labour gain from National Liberal		Swing		

=== Election results 1950–1974 ===
==== Elections in the 1950s ====
General election 1950: Luton
Party	Candidate	Votes	%
National Liberal (Conservative)	Charles Hill	22,946	46.59
Labour	William Warbey	21,860	44.38
Liberal	Wilfred Matthews	4,447	9.03
Majority		1,086	2.21
Turnout		49,253	87.07
Registered electors		56,569	
National Liberal win (new boundaries)			

General election 1951: Luton
Party	Candidate	Votes	%	±%
National Liberal (Conservative)	Charles Hill	26,554	52.69	
Labour	William Warbey	23,842	47.31	
Majority		2,712	5.38	
Turnout		50,396	87.59	
Registered electors		57,355		
National Liberal hold		Swing		

General election 1955: Luton
Party	Candidate	Votes	%	±%
National Liberal (Conservative)	Charles Hill	24,722	51.33	
Labour	Morris Janis	20,304	42.15	
Liberal	Jean Henderson	3,140	6.52	N/A
Majority		4,418	9.18	
Turnout		48,166	83.14	
Registered electors		57,932		
National Liberal hold		Swing		

General election 1959: Luton
Party	Candidate	Votes	%	±%
National Liberal (Conservative)	Charles Hill	27,153	55.09	
Labour Co-op	Cyril Rawlett Fenton	22,134	44.91	
Majority		5,019	10.18	
Turnout		49,287	82.46	
Registered electors		57,769		
National Liberal hold		Swing		

==== Elections in the 1960s ====
1963 Luton by-election
Party	Candidate	Votes	%	±%
Labour	William Howie	21,108	48.02	+3.11
Conservative	John Fletcher-Cooke	17,359	39.49	−15.60
Liberal	Malvyn A Benjamin	5,001	11.38	N/A
Communist	Tony Chater	490	1.11	New
Majority		3,749	8.53	N/A
Turnout		43,958	74.0	
Registered electors		59,395		
Labour gain from National Liberal		Swing		

General election 1964: Luton
Party	Candidate	Votes	%	±%
Labour	William Howie	23,751	50.16	+5.25
Conservative	Charles Simeons	23,028	48.64	−6.45
Communist	Tony Chater	567	1.20	N/A
Majority		723	1.52	N/A
Turnout		47,346	79.84	
Registered electors		59,299		
Labour gain from National Liberal		Swing		

General election 1966: Luton
Party	Candidate	Votes	%	±%
Labour	William Howie	23,069	48.76	
Conservative	Charles Simeons	20,605	43.55	
Liberal	Thomas H Daniels	3,049	6.44	New
Communist	Tony Chater	586	1.24	
Majority		2,464	5.21	
Turnout		47,309	79.21	
Registered electors		59,725		
Labour hold		Swing		

==== Elections in the 1970s ====
General election 1970: Luton
Party	Candidate	Votes	%	±%
Conservative	Charles Simeons	23,308	50.99	
Labour	William Howie	21,959	48.04	
Communist	Tony Chater	447	0.98	
Majority		1,349	2.95	N/A
Turnout		45,714	73.17	
Registered electors		62,429		
Conservative gain from Labour		Swing		

== See also ==
- List of former United Kingdom Parliament constituencies
