= Beeston (constituency) =

UK Parliament constituency (1974–1983)

- Former borough constituency for the House of Commons
- County: Nottinghamshire

1974–1983
- Seats: One
- Created from: Rushcliffe
- Replaced by: Broxtowe and Ashfield

Beeston was a parliamentary constituency in Nottinghamshire which returned one Member of Parliament (MP) to the House of Commons of the Parliament of the United Kingdom.

It was created for the February 1974 general election from part of the Rushcliffe constituency, and abolished for the 1983 general election.

The seat was last held by Sir James Lester (Conservative) between 28 February 1974 to 9 June 1983.

== Boundaries ==
The Urban Districts of Beeston and Stapleford, and Eastwood, and in the Rural District of Basford the parishes of Awsworth, Brinsley, Cossall, Greasley, Kimberley, Nuthall, Strelley, and Trowell.

== Members of Parliament ==
Election	Member	Party
Feb 1974	Jim Lester	Conservative
1983	constituency abolished	

== Elections ==
General election February 1974: Beeston
Party	Candidate	Votes	%	±%
Conservative	James Theodore Lester	26,487	42.36	
Labour Co-op	Antony John Gardner	23,943	38.30	
Liberal	Stuart Charles Reddish	12,091	19.34	
Majority		2,544	4.06	
Turnout		62,521	84.91	
Conservative win (new seat)				

General election October 1974: Beeston
Party	Candidate	Votes	%	±%
Conservative	James Theodore Lester	25,095	42.0	−0.4
Labour Co-op	Antony John Gardner	24,974	41.8	+3.5
Liberal	Stuart Charles Reddish	9,658	16.2	−3.1
Majority		121	0.2	−3.9
Turnout		59,727	80.5	−4.4
Conservative hold		Swing	-2.0	

General election 1979: Beeston
Party	Candidate	Votes	%	±%
Conservative	James Theodore Lester	33,273	52.6	+10.6
Labour	Joseph M Jacob	23,077	36.5	−5.3
Liberal	Timothy Turner	6,935	11.0	−5.2
Majority		10,196	16.1	+15.9
Turnout		63,285	81.3	+0.8
Conservative hold		Swing	+11.0	
