= Ivor Clemitson =

British politician

Member of Parliament for Luton East
- In office 28 February 1974 – 7 April 1979
- Preceded by: Constituency established
- Succeeded by: Graham Bright

Personal details
- Born: Ivor Malcolm Clemitson; 8 December 1931
- Died: 24 December 1997 (aged 66)
- Party: Labour

Ivor Malcolm Clemitson (8 December 1931 – 24 December 1997) was a British Labour politician.

He attended Luton Grammar School. Having graduated from the London School of Economics and completed National Service in the Royal Air Force, he trained as a Church of England priest and was ordained in 1958. In order to stand for Parliament in 1974, he had to renounce his orders.

At the February 1974 general election, Clemitson was elected as Member of Parliament for Luton East. He lived in the constituency and held his seat at the October 1974 election but, at the 1979 general election, lost by 847 votes to the Conservative Graham Bright.

After this he worked for the TGWU. He stood again in the 1983 general election but was not successful.

He moved to France with his wife (Janet) and daughter (Suzannah) in the late 1990s and died at his home there, aged 66, just before Christmas 1997. Following his death, his sister, Jean, persuaded the General Synod of the Church of England to permit a stained glass window to be installed in his memory at St Mary's Church in Harlington, Bedfordshire, the village where they had lived for some time during childhood. The window, designed by Petri Anderson, was dedicated in May 2009.

Clemitson co-wrote A Life to Live: Beyond Full Employment (Junction Books, 1981) with George Rogers MP. William Howie, Baron Howie of Troon wrote that Clemitson was on the left of the Party, but "his leftishness was never, that I can recall, exaggerated: it was always moderate and well-mannered".

Clemitson House, a municipal building in the centre of Luton, is named in memory of Clemitson and his father (Daniel), who had served as an alderman on the local council. Clemitson was a lifelong supporter of Luton Town Football Club.

Parliament of the United Kingdom
New constituency	Member of Parliament for Luton East; Feb 1974–1979	Succeeded by Graham Bright
