= 1911 Luton by-election =

UK parliamentary by-election

The 1911 Luton by-election was a Parliamentary by-election held on 20 July 1911. It returned one Member of Parliament (MP) to the House of Commons of the Parliament of the United Kingdom, elected by the first past the post voting system.

== Vacancy ==
Thomas Ashton had been the Liberal MP here since 1895. Luton had been Liberal since the seat was created in 1885. He was raised to the peerage as Baron Ashton of Hyde, in the County of Chester, with a seat in the House of Lords.

== Electoral history ==
Thomas Ashton

General election December 1910 Electorate 16,564
| Party | Candidate | Votes | % | ±% |
|---|---|---|---|---|
| Liberal | Thomas Ashton | 7,601 | 53.4 | +0.5 |
| Conservative | John Owen Hickman | 6,623 | 46.6 | −0.5 |
| Majority | | 978 | 6.8 | +1.0 |
| Turnout | | 14,224 | 85.9 | −4.8 |
| Liberal hold | | Swing | +0.5 | |

== Candidates ==
The new Liberal candidate selected to defend the seat was Cecil Harmsworth. He had been Liberal MP for Droitwich, Worcestershire until his defeat there in January 1910. The Conservatives re-selected John Owen Hickman, who had been their candidate last time.

== Result ==
Cecil Harmsworth held the seat for the Liberal Party.

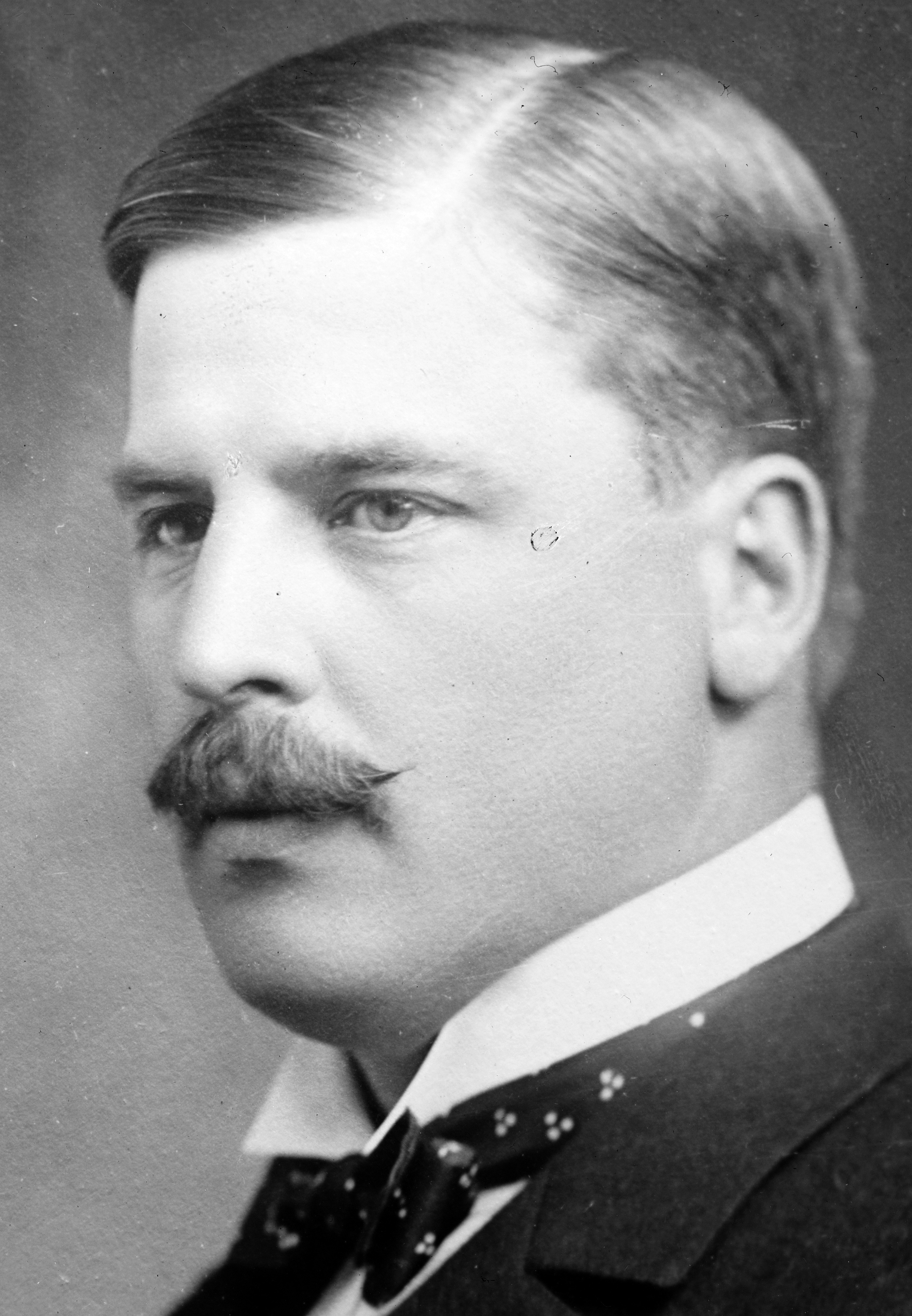
Cecil Harmsworth

Luton by-election, 1911 Electorate 17,177
| Party | Candidate | Votes | % | ±% |
|---|---|---|---|---|
| Liberal | Cecil Harmsworth | 7,619 | 52.1 | −1.3 |
| Conservative | John Owen Hickman | 7,006 | 47.9 | +1.3 |
| Majority | | 613 | 4.2 | −2.6 |
| Turnout | | 14,625 | 85.1 | −0.8 |
| Liberal hold | | Swing | -1.3 | |

== Aftermath ==
A General Election was due to take place by the end of 1915. By the autumn of 1914, the following candidates had been adopted to contest that election. Due to the outbreak of war, the election never took place.

General Election 1914/15 Electorate 19,199
| Party | Candidate | Votes | % | ±% |
|---|---|---|---|---|
| Liberal | Cecil Harmsworth | | | |
| Unionist | | | | |

General election 14 December 1918 Electorate 37,051
| Party | Candidate | Votes | % | ±% |
|---|---|---|---|---|
| Liberal | *Cecil Harmsworth | 13,501 | 69.4 | +16.0 |
| Labour | Willet Ball | 5,964 | 30.6 | New |
| Majority | | 7,537 | 38.8 | +32.0 |
| Turnout | | 19,465 | 52.5 | −23.4 |
| Liberal hold | | Swing | | |

- Harmsworth was the endorsed candidate of the Coalition Government.
