= 1953 Broxtowe by-election =

UK parliamentary by-election

The Broxtowe by-election was held on 17 September 1953. It was held due to the death of the incumbent Labour MP Seymour Cocks. It was won by the Labour candidate William Warbey.

By Election 17 September 1953: Broxtowe
Party	Candidate	Votes	%	±%
Labour	Will Warbey	27,356	74.11	+1.43
Conservative	AJ Gorman	9,559	25.89	−1.43
Majority		17,797	48.22	+2.86
Turnout		36,915		
Labour hold		Swing		
