= Charles Hill, Baron Hill of Luton =

British physician, medical spokesman, radio speaker, and member of parliament

The Right Honourable The Lord Hill of Luton PC

Chairman of the Board of Governors of the BBC
- In office 1 September 1967 – 14 December 1972
- Prime Minister: Harold Wilson; Edward Heath
- Deputy: Robert Lusty; The Lord Fulton
- Preceded by: The Lord Normanbrook
- Succeeded by: Sir Michael Swann

Chancellor of the Duchy of Lancaster
- In office 13 January 1957 – 9 October 1961
- Prime Minister: Harold Macmillan
- Preceded by: The Earl of Selkirk
- Succeeded by: Iain Macleod

Member of Parliament for Luton
- In office 23 February 1950 – 13 June 1963
- Preceded by: William Warbey
- Succeeded by: Will Howie

Member of the House of Lords Lord Temporal
- In office 13 June 1963 – 22 August 1989; Life Peerage

Personal details
- Born: 15 January 1904 London, United Kingdom
- Died: 22 August 1989 (aged 85)
- Spouse: Marion Spencer Wallace
- Education: Trinity College, Cambridge
- Occupation: Businessman, administrator

Charles Hill, Baron Hill of Luton, PC (15 January 1904 – 22 August 1989) was a British physician and medical spokesman, radio speaker, member of parliament, government minister and broadcasting executive.

== Early life and career ==
Charles Hill was born in Islington, London and was educated at St Olave's Grammar School in Southwark, London. He won a scholarship to Trinity College, Cambridge, where he gained a first class degree. He continued his medical studies at the London Hospital gaining MRCS and MRCP in 1927 and later he gained MB, BCh and MD. He became Deputy Medical Officer of Oxford in 1930. He became Assistant Secretary of the British Medical Association from 1932 and Secretary from 1944 to 1950.

During the Second World War, the Ministry of Health had wanted the BBC to infiltrate health messages into ordinary programmes rather than have dedicated programmes from the Ministry of Food, but the BBC warned that this would not be effective and would be viewed by listeners as patronising. Consequently, Hill's role as the "Radio Doctor" became part of the Ministry of Food's programme, Kitchen Front, broadcast every morning from 1942. Because of the then rules about members of the medical profession advertising he could not broadcast under his own name, and so was just 'The Radio Doctor'. His distinctive rich voice helped make an impact.

Hill was still the BMA's Secretary when the National Health Service was introduced in 1948. He negotiated with Aneurin Bevan and ensured that general practitioners did not simply become salaried employees.

== Political career ==
Hill stood for Parliament for University of Cambridge in 1945 as an independent. He was successful in 1950, becoming MP for Luton as a Conservative and National Liberal.

He was appointed Parliamentary Secretary to the Ministry of Food in 1951. He became the Postmaster-General (a non-cabinet ministerial position with responsibilities that included broadcasting) in 1955; during his period in office he publicly berated the BBC for its reporting of the Suez Crisis. In May 1956, Hill attempted to formalise the existing agreement by which discussions or statements about matters before Parliament could not be broadcast in the fortnight preceding any debate (the 'fourteen-day rule'). However, the Suez Crisis rendered this policy unworkable in practice and the government agreed to its suspension at the end of the year. Hill, who had been uneasy about the implications of the rule for freedom of expression, was relieved.

From 1957 to 1961, he was Chancellor of the Duchy of Lancaster and from 1961 he was Minister of Housing and Local Government and Welsh Affairs, but he lost his place in the Cabinet in Harold Macmillan's 'Night of the Long Knives' reshuffle in 1962.

== Post-political career ==
He was appointed as the Chairman of the Independent Television Authority in 1963, where he continued his hostile attitude towards the BBC. He was created a life peer on 13 June 1963 as Baron Hill of Luton, of Harpenden in the County of Hertford. In 1967, Hill announced that all the ITV contracts were to be re-advertised, because he was concerned about the large profits being made by the major companies and their lack of regional identity. This resulted in a radical reorganisation of the ITV network.

He succeeded Lord Normanbrook as the Chairman of the BBC Governors (1967–1972), having been appointed by the Prime Minister, Harold Wilson, to "sort out" the Corporation. His appointment as BBC chairman surprised the BBC's Governors and several resigned. Sir Robert Lusty, the acting chairman, commented that "it was like inviting Rommel to command the Eighth Army on the eve of Alamein".

Harold Wilson encouraged Lord Hill to be active in editorial decisions. Hill had a difficult relationship with the Director-General of the BBC, Hugh Greene, and he eventually forced Greene to resign in 1969. Greene later described Hill as a "vulgarian". He had a quieter relationship with Greene's successor, Charles Curran. He retired from the BBC in 1972 and died in 1989, aged 85.

He married Marion Spencer Wallace, with whom he had two sons and three daughters.

== Selected publications ==
Hill of Luton Charles Hill. (1936) The Development of Osteopathy.

Hill Charles and H. A Clegg. (1937). What Is Osteopathy? London: J.M. Dent & Sons.

Hill of Luton Charles Hill and Great Britain Ministry of Information. (1943) Wise Eating in Wartime. H.M. Stationery Office

Hill of Luton Charles Hill. (1944) Your Body; How It Works and How to Keep It Working Well. London: Burke.

Hill of Luton Charles Hill. (1950). Bringing Up Your Child. London: Phoenix House.

Hill of Luton Charles Hill. (1952) The Radio Doctor's Dictionary of Health. Phoenix House.

Hill of Luton Charles Hill. (1964) Both Sides of the Hill [by] Lord Hill of Luton. Heinemann.

Luton, Hill of (1974). Behind the screen: the broadcasting memoirs of Lord Hill of Luton. London: Sidgwick & Jackson. ISBN 978-0-283-98181-4.

Parliament of the United Kingdom
Preceded by William Warbey	Member of Parliament for Luton; 1950–1963	Succeeded by Will Howie
Political offices
Preceded by The Earl De La Warr	Postmaster General; 1955–1957	Succeeded by Ernest Marples
Preceded by The Earl of Selkirk	Chancellor of the Duchy of Lancaster; 1957–1961	Succeeded by Iain Macleod
Media offices
Preceded by Sir Ivone Kirkpatrick	Chairman of the Independent Television Authority; 1963–1967	Succeeded by The Lord Aylestone
Preceded by The Lord Normanbrook	Chairman of the BBC Board of Governors; 1967–1972	Succeeded by Sir Michael Swann
