= Fanny by Gaslight (TV series) =

- Genre: Drama
- Based on: Fanny by Gaslight by Michael Sadleir
- Written by: Anthony Steven
- Directed by: Peter Jefferies
- Starring: Chloe Salaman; Peter Woodward; Michael Culver; Julia Chambers
- Country of origin: United Kingdom
- Original language: English
- No. of series: 1
- No. of episodes: 4

Production
- Production company: BBC

Original release
- Network: BBC1
- Release: 24 September – 15 October 1981

Fanny by Gaslight is a British four-part drama television series, which originally aired on BBC1 between 24 September and 15 October 1981. It was an adaptation of the 1940 novel Fanny by Gaslight by Michael Sadleir, which had previously been adapted into a film Fanny by Gaslight in 1944. The series was adapted by Anthony Steven, directed by Peter Jefferies and produced by Joe Waters. Chloe Salaman plays the title role of Fanny Hooper, a young woman who is orphaned and faced with hardship in Victorian London.

== Partial cast ==
- Chloe Salaman – Fanny Hooper
- Peter Woodward – Harry Somerford
- Michael Culver – Lord Manderstoke
- Julia Chambers – Lucy Beckett
