= 1963 Luton by-election =

UK Parliamentary by-election

The 1963 Luton by-election was held on 7 November 1963 following the resignation of the former "radio doctor" and Conservative Minister Charles Hill. Hill had a majority of over 5,000 at the 1959 general election, but the Luton seat was won by the Labour candidate Will Howie with a majority of 3,749.

Luton by-election, 7 November 1963
Party	Candidate	Votes	%	±%
Labour	William Howie	21,108	48.02	+3.11
Conservative	John Fletcher-Cooke	17,359	39.49	−15.60
Liberal	Malvyn A Benjamin	5,001	11.38	N/A
Communist	Tony Chater	490	1.11	New
Majority		3,749	8.53	N/A
Turnout		43,958		
Labour gain from Conservative		Swing		
