= Willet Ball =

British journalist and activist

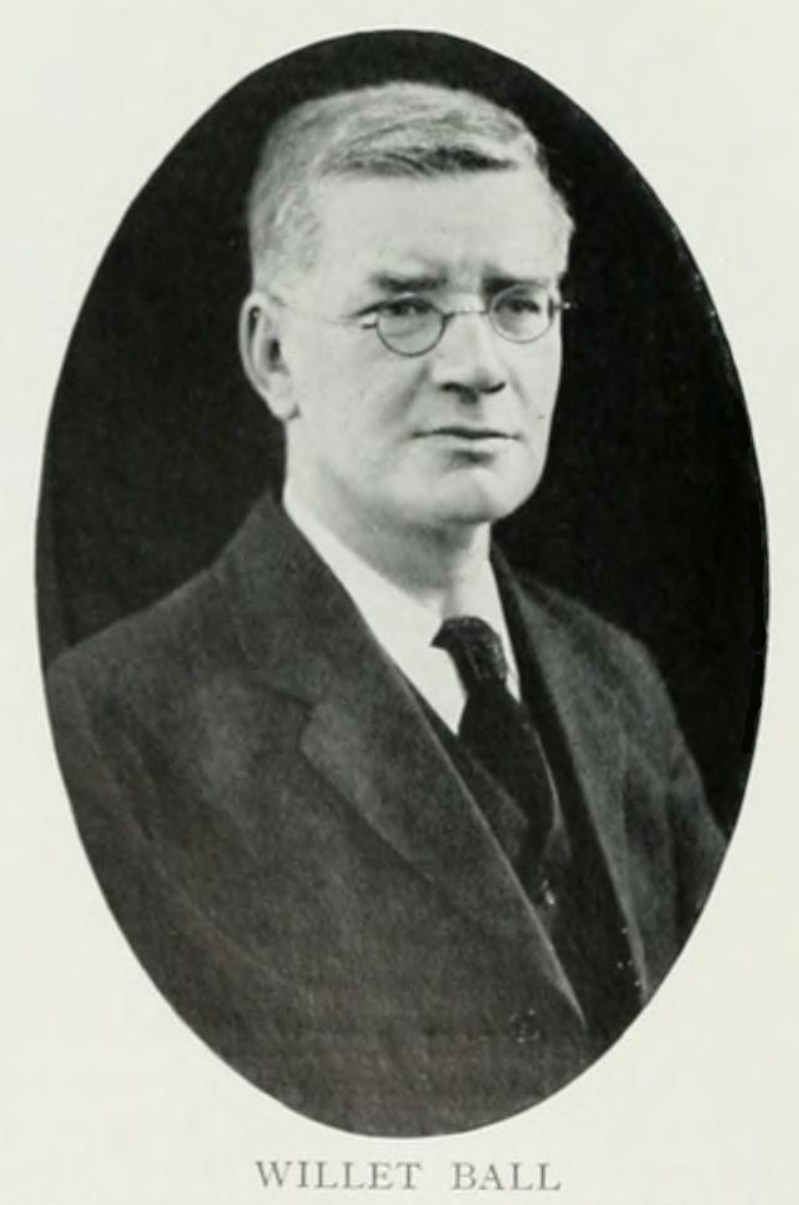
- Willet Ball (photographed in about 1922).
- Born: Willet Ball; 1873; Lincoln, England
- Died: 1 June 1962 (aged 89)
- Occupation(s): Journalist, political activist
- Spouse: May Bellamy

Willet Ball (1873 – 1 June 1962) was a British journalist, trade unionist and political activist.

== Biography ==
Willet Ball was born in 1873 at Lincoln in Lincolnshire. He was educated at the Lincoln Middle School.

In 1888 Ball began working as a clerk for the Great Northern Railway Company. He joined the National Union of Railwaymen (NUR) in 1892 when he was aged nineteen. Ball was also a member of the Social Democratic Federation.

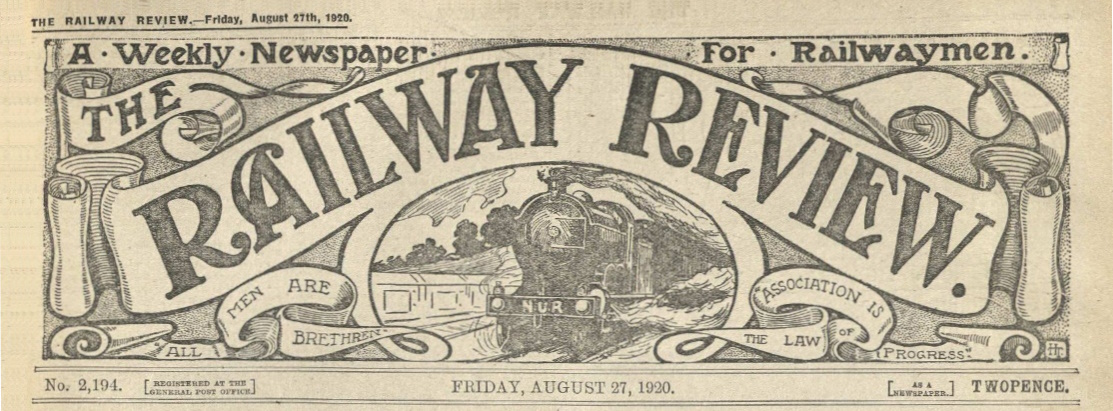
The banner of The Railway Review, dated 27 August 1920.

In September 1900 Ball he became a full-time sub-editor for the NUR's newly-established weekly newspaper, The Railway Review, writing for the journal under the nom-de-plume of 'Sphere'. The Railway Review included reports from NUR branches from around the country, acting as a community voice for the railwaymen union members. In April 1918 Ball was appointed editor of the newspaper after the resignation of the previous editor, G. J. Wardle.

Willet Ball and May Bellamy were married on 15 September 1904 in Lincolnshire and the couple had at least three children. In 1911 the family was living at Luton in Bedfordshire.

Trade union membership increased in Luton during World War I as local engineering firms expanded during the war years. Ball was selected as the Labour candidate to contest the seat of Luton in the general election of December 1918, immediately after hostilities had ended. He was later described as "a trade union journalist who was a born fighter but in those days usually spoke with more bitterness than persuasion". A hand-out supporting Ball's candidature entreated electors to "vote for Ball and show yourselves against Conscription, Militarism, Autocracy, Dictatorship and Profiteering", concluding with "Mothers, Save your Sons!". He was unsuccessful in the election, taking second place with 30.6% of the vote. Ball did not stand in the 1922 general election, but contested the seat again in 1923, when he attracted only 9.9% of the vote.

In 1927 Ball was appointed as a director of the Luton Town Football Club.

Ball retired in 1933, spending time indulging his hobby of bowling. He also served as a magistrate in Luton and was a member of the Luton Borough Education Committee.

May Ball died in January 1946 at Luton. Willet Ball died on 1 June 1962.
