= Broxtowe (constituency) =

UK Parliament constituency (since 1983)

Coordinates: 52.90°N 1.25°W

- County constituency for the House of Commons
- Interactive map of boundaries from 2024
- Location within the East Midlands
- County: Nottinghamshire
- Population: 94,971 (2011 census)
- Electorate: 72,461 (March 2020)
- Major settlements: Beeston, Stapleford and Eastwood

Current constituency
- Created: 1983
- Member of Parliament: Juliet Campbell (Labour)
- Seats: One
- Created from: Beeston

1918–1955
- Seats: One
- Type of constituency: County constituency
- Created from: Rushcliffe and Mansfield
- Replaced by: Ashfield and Rushcliffe

Broxtowe is a parliamentary constituency (Note: A county constituency (for the purposes of election expenses and type of returning officer)) in Nottinghamshire, England, represented in the House of Commons of the UK Parliament since 2024 by Juliet Campbell, from the Labour Party.

== Constituency profile ==
Broxtowe is a suburban constituency in Nottinghamshire, to the west of the city of Nottingham, and almost identical in character to the seat of Gedling east of Nottingham. Broxtowe lies along the county's western border with Erewash in Derbyshire. There is no town or village called Broxtowe, rather the constituency covers the vast majority of the Borough of Broxtowe (except the towns of Kimberley and Nuthall which are in the Nottingham North and Kimberley constituency), its name derived from the old Broxtowe wapentake of Nottinghamshire, which covered a larger area. The constituency includes the towns of Beeston and Stapleford, and generally affluent villages such as Attenborough, home of Attenborough Nature Reserve, a local attraction. Beeston is the largest town and the base of the borough council, and is on the border of the main campus of the University of Nottingham, as such is home to a large number of the university's staff and a small number of students. It is also home to the headquarters of the company Boots.

Since 2024, the constituency has also included the town of Eastwood (in the Borough of Broxtowe but previously in the Ashfield constituency), birthplace of the author D. H. Lawrence.

It is a marginal seat between the Labour and the Conservative parties. At the 2017 snap election, less than two percentage points separated the Conservative and Labour parties, with Labour's main strength in Beeston with the smaller residential towns such as Chilwell mostly Conservative.

Attenborough Nature Reserve

== Boundaries ==
=== Historic ===
Map of boundaries 2010-2024

1918–1950: The Urban Districts of Arnold, Eastwood, Hucknall, and Kirkby-in-Ashfield, and in the Rural District of Basford the parishes of Annesley, Bestwood Park, Brinsley, Calverton, Felley, Greasley, Kimberley, Lambley, Linby, Newstead, Papplewick, Selston, and Woodborough.

1950–1955: The Urban Districts of Eastwood, Hucknall, and Kirkby-in-Ashfield, and in the Rural District of Basford the parishes of Annesley, Awsworth, Bestwood Park, Brinsley, Cossall, Felley, Greasley, Kimberley, Linby, Newstead, Nuthall, Papplewick, Selston, Strelley, and Trowell.

1983–2010: The Borough of Broxtowe wards of Attenborough, Awsworth and Cossall, Beeston Central, Beeston North East, Beeston North West, Beeston Rylands, Bramcote, Chilwell East, Chilwell West, Greasley, Kimberley, Nuthall, Stapleford East, Stapleford North, Stapleford West, Strelley and Trowell, and Toton.

2010–2024: The Borough of Broxtowe wards of Attenborough, Awsworth, Beeston Central, Beeston North, Beeston Rylands, Beeston West, Bramcote, Chilwell East, Chilwell West, Cossall and Kimberley, Greasley Giltbrook and Newthorpe, Nuthall East and Strelley, Nuthall West and Greasley Watnall, Stapleford North, Stapleford South East, Stapleford South West, Toton and Chilwell Meadows, and Trowell.

=== Current ===
Further to the 2023 review of Westminster constituencies, which came into effect for the 2024 general election, the constituency comprises the following wards of the Borough of Broxtowe:

- Attenborough & Chilwell East; Awsworth, Cossall & Trowell; Beeston Central; Beeston North; Beeston Rylands; Beeston West; Bramcote; Brinsley; Chilwell West; Eastwood Hall; Eastwood Hilltop; Eastwood St. Mary’s; Greasley; Stapleford North; Stapleford South East; Stapleford South West; and Toton & Chilwell Meadows.

The town of Eastwood was added from Ashfield, offset by the transfer of Kimberley, Nuthall & Watnall to the new constituency of Nottingham North and Kimberley.

== Members of Parliament ==
=== MPs 1918–1955 ===
Rushcliffe and Mansfield prior to 1918

Election	Member	Party	Notes
1918	George Spencer	Labour	
1929	Seymour Cocks	Labour	Died May 1953
1953 by-election	Will Warbey	Labour	
1955	constituency abolished		

=== MPs since 1983 ===
Beeston prior to 1983

Election	Member	Party
1983	Jim Lester	Conservative
1997	Nick Palmer	Labour
2010	Anna Soubry	Conservative
Feb 2019	Anna Soubry	Change UK
2019	Darren Henry	Conservative
2024	Juliet Campbell	Labour

== Elections ==
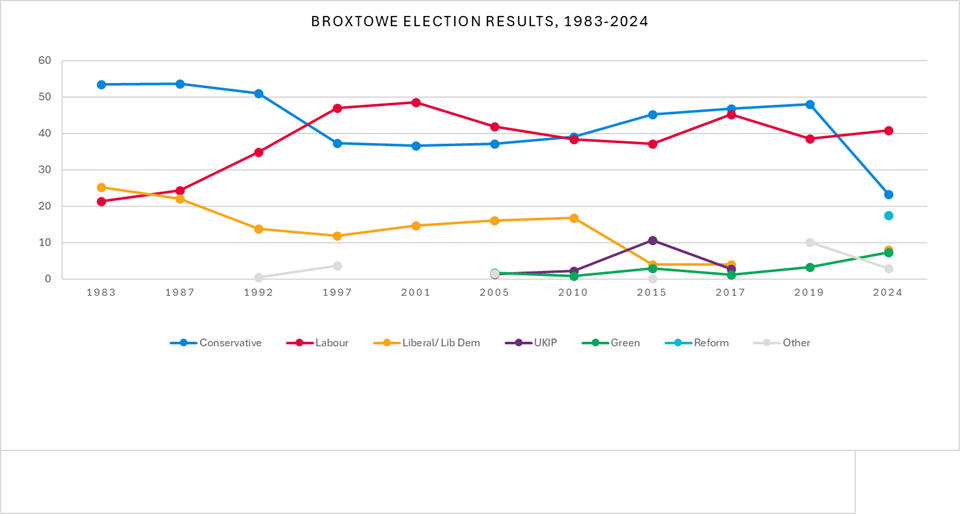
Broxtowe election results 1983-2024

=== Elections in the 2020s ===
General election 2024: Broxtowe
Party	Candidate	Votes	%	±%
Labour	Juliet Campbell	19,561	40.9	+2.9
Conservative	Darren Henry	11,158	23.3	−21.9
Reform	Joseph Oakley	8,402	17.6	+16.9
Liberal Democrats	James Collis	3,807	8.0	+7.5
Green	Teresa Needham	3,488	7.3	+4.3
Independent	John Doddy	1,034	2.2	N/A
Workers Party	Masqood Syed	388	0.8	N/A
Majority		8,403	17.6	N/A
Turnout		47,838	66.5	−9.7
Registered electors		71,923		
Labour gain from Conservative		Swing	+12.4	

=== Elections in the 2010s ===
2019 notional result
Party	Vote	%
Conservative	24,083	45.2
Labour	20,264	38
Independent Group for Change	3,846	7.2
Ashfield Independents	1,963	3.7
Green Party of England and Wales	1,606	3
English Democrats	432	0.8
Brexit Party	364	0.7
Independent politician	321	0.6
Liberal Democrats	270	0.5
Church of the Militant Elvis Party	172	0.3
Majority	3,819	7.2
Turnout	53,321	73.6
Electorate	72,461	

General election 2019: Broxtowe
Party	Candidate	Votes	%	±%
Conservative	Darren Henry	26,602	48.1	+1.3
Labour	Greg Marshall	21,271	38.5	−6.8
The Independent Group for Change	Anna Soubry	4,668	8.5	New
Green	Kat Boettge	1,806	3.3	+2.1
English Democrat	Amy Dalla Mura	432	0.8	New
Independent	Teck Khong	321	0.6	New
Militant Elvis Anti-HS2	David Bishop	172	0.3	New
Majority		5,331	9.6	+8.1
Turnout		55,272	75.7	+0.7
Conservative hold		Swing	+4.1	

General election 2017: Broxtowe
Party	Candidate	Votes	%	±%
Conservative	Anna Soubry	25,983	46.8	+1.6
Labour	Greg Marshall	25,120	45.3	+8.1
Liberal Democrats	Tim Hallam	2,247	4.0	0.0
UKIP	Fran Loi	1,477	2.7	−7.9
Green	Pat Morton	681	1.2	−1.7
Majority		863	1.5	−6.5
Turnout		55,508	75.0	+0.6
Conservative hold		Swing	−3.23	

General election 2015: Broxtowe
Party	Candidate	Votes	%	±%
Conservative	Anna Soubry	24,163	45.2	+6.2
Labour	Nick Palmer	19,876	37.2	−1.1
UKIP	Frank Dunne	5,674	10.6	+8.3
Liberal Democrats	Stan Heptinstall	2,120	4.0	−12.9
Green	David Kirwan	1,544	2.9	+2.1
Justice for Men and Boys	Ray Barry	63	0.1	New
Majority		4,287	8.0	+7.3
Turnout		53,440	74.4	+1.2
Conservative hold		Swing	+3.65	

General election 2010: Broxtowe
Party	Candidate	Votes	%	±%
Conservative	Anna Soubry	20,585	39.0	+1.8
Labour	Nick Palmer	20,196	38.3	−3.4
Liberal Democrats	David Watts	8,907	16.9	+0.8
BNP	Michael Shore	1,422	2.7	New
UKIP	Chris Cobb	1,194	2.3	+0.8
Green	David Mitchell	423	0.8	−1.1
Majority		389	0.7	N/A
Turnout		52,727	73.2	+4.2
Conservative gain from Labour		Swing	+2.6	

=== Elections in the 2000s ===
General election 2005: Broxtowe
Party	Candidate	Votes	%	±%
Labour	Nick Palmer	20,457	41.9	−6.7
Conservative	Bob Seely	18,161	37.2	+0.5
Liberal Democrats	David Watts	7,837	16.1	+1.4
Green	Paul Anderson	896	1.8	New
UKIP	Patricia Wolfe	695	1.4	New
Veritas	Damian Hockney	590	1.2	New
Independent	Mark Gregory	170	0.3	New
Majority		2,296	4.7	−7.2
Turnout		48,806	68.6	+2.1
Labour hold		Swing	−3.6	

General election 2001: Broxtowe
Party	Candidate	Votes	%	±%
Labour	Nick Palmer	23,836	48.6	+1.6
Conservative	Pauline Latham	17,963	36.7	−0.7
Liberal Democrats	David K. Watts	7,205	14.7	+2.8
Majority		5,873	11.9	+2.3
Turnout		49,004	66.5	−11.8
Labour hold		Swing		

=== Elections in the 1990s ===
General election 1997: Broxtowe
Party	Candidate	Votes	%	±%
Labour	Nick Palmer	27,343	47.0	+12.2
Conservative	Jim Lester	21,768	37.4	−13.6
Liberal Democrats	Terence P. Miller	6,934	11.9	−1.9
Referendum	Roy Tucker	2,092	3.6	New
Majority		5,575	9.6	N/A
Turnout		58,133	78.3	−5.1
Labour gain from Conservative		Swing	+12.9	

General election 1992: Broxtowe
Party	Candidate	Votes	%	±%
Conservative	Jim Lester	31,096	51.0	−2.6
Labour	James R. W. Walker	21,205	34.8	+10.5
Liberal Democrats	John D. Ross	8,395	13.8	−8.3
Natural Law	David Lukehurst	293	0.5	New
Majority		9,891	16.2	−13.1
Turnout		60,989	83.4	+4.2
Conservative hold		Swing	−6.6	

=== Elections in the 1980s ===
General election 1987: Broxtowe
Party	Candidate	Votes	%	±%
Conservative	Jim Lester	30,462	53.6	+0.1
Labour	Kenneth Fleet	13,811	24.3	+3.0
Liberal	Keith Melton	12,562	22.1	−2.1
Majority		16,651	29.3	+1.0
Turnout		71,780	79.2	+2.7
Conservative hold		Swing		

General election 1983: Broxtowe
Party	Candidate	Votes	%	±%
Conservative	Jim Lester	28,522	53.5	
Liberal	Keith Melton	13,444	25.2	
Labour	Michael Warner	11,368	21.3	
Majority		15,078	28.3	
Turnout		69,760	76.5	
Conservative win (new seat)				

=== Elections in the 1950s ===
1953 Broxtowe by-election
Party	Candidate	Votes	%	±%
Labour	William Warbey	27,356	74.11	+1.43
Conservative	Anthony J. Gorman	9,559	25.89	−1.43
Majority		17,797	48.22	+2.86
Turnout		36,915	63.5	−20.6
Labour hold		Swing	+1.4	

General election 1951: Broxtowe
Party	Candidate	Votes	%	±%
Labour	Seymour Cocks	35,317	72.68	
Conservative	Anthony J. Gorman	13,274	27.32	
Majority		22,043	45.36	
Turnout		48,591	84.09	
Labour hold		Swing		

General election 1950: Broxtowe
Party	Candidate	Votes	%	±%
Labour	Seymour Cocks	35,471	72.51	
Conservative	C. Peter B. Bailey	13,445	27.49	
Majority		22,026	45.02	
Turnout		48,916	86.10	
Labour hold		Swing		

=== Election in the 1940s ===
General election 1945: Broxtowe
Party	Candidate	Votes	%	±%
Labour	Seymour Cocks	39,545	72.05	
Conservative	Gerald Stanley Moore Bowman	15,344	27.95	
Majority		24,201	44.10	
Turnout		54,889	78.45	
Labour hold		Swing		

=== Elections in the 1930s ===
General election 1935: Broxtowe
Party	Candidate	Votes	%	±%
Labour	Seymour Cocks	26,854	62.95	
Conservative	Paul Eyre Springman	15,804	37.05	
Majority		11,050	25.90	
Turnout		42,658	73.49	
Labour hold		Swing		

General election 1931: Broxtowe
Party	Candidate	Votes	%	±%
Labour	Seymour Cocks	21,917	51.88	
Conservative	Paul Eyre Springman	20,327	48.12	
Majority		1,590	3.76	
Turnout		42,244	78.57	
Labour hold		Swing		

=== Elections in the 1920s ===
General election 1929: Broxtowe
Party	Candidate	Votes	%	±%
Labour	Seymour Cocks	24,603	59.1	+3.7
Liberal	Ernest George Cove	9,814	23.6	−21.0
Unionist	Gervas Pierrepont	7,194	17.3	New
Majority		14,789	35.5	+24.7
Turnout		41,611	81.2	+13.5
Registered electors		51,249		
Labour hold		Swing	+12.4	

General election 1924: Broxtowe
Party	Candidate	Votes	%	±%
Labour	George Spencer	15,276	55.4	+0.9
Liberal	Thomas Ernest Jackson	12,313	44.6	−0.9
Majority		2,963	10.8	+1.8
Turnout		27,589	68.7	+6.7
Registered electors		40,171		
Labour hold		Swing	+0.9	

General election 1923: Broxtowe
Party	Candidate	Votes	%	±%
Labour	George Spencer	13,219	54.5	+3.7
Liberal	George Julian Selwyn Scovell	11,049	45.5	−3.7
Majority		2,170	9.0	+7.4
Turnout		24,268	62.0	+2.2
Registered electors		39,169		
Labour hold		Swing	+3.7	

General election 1922: Broxtowe
Party	Candidate	Votes	%	±%
Labour	George Spencer	11,699	50.8	−4.4
National Liberal	Charles Ernest Tee	11,328	49.2	New
Majority		371	1.6	−30.4
Turnout		23,027	59.8	+3.4
Registered electors		38,475		
Labour hold		Swing	N/A	

=== Elections in the 1910s ===
General election 1918: Broxtowe
Party	Candidate	Votes	%	±%
Labour	George Spencer	11,150	55.2	
Liberal	Charles Seely	4,681	23.2	
National Democratic	Herbert Hoyle Whaite	4,374	21.6	
Majority		6,469	32.0	
Turnout		20,205	56.4	
Registered electors		35,826		
Labour win (new seat)				

== See also ==
- List of parliamentary constituencies in Nottinghamshire
