= Harry Gilpin =

Edmund Henry Gilpin (4 February 1876 – 24 July 1950), known as Harry Gilpin, was a British politician and company director.

== Life ==
Gilpin's Quaker parents were Margaret (born Binns) and Edmund Octavius Gilpin. His family had several notable members. His elder sister, Eva Gilpin, was an educationalist who founded a novel school. He was given a Quaker education at Ackworth School where there was learning tracts and the art classes concentrated on the means of production.

In 1891 he went to work in the warehouse of Joseph Baker. He was rapidly promoted in the company, becoming a director in 1913. He served with Red Cross during the First World War, resigning from the Quakers because he supported the war.

In 1920, Gilpin led the merger of the company to form Baker Perkins Ltd. He also became active in the Liberal Party, standing unsuccessfully for the party in Finsbury at the 1922 general election. Although he never stood for Parliament again, he remained politically active, taking part in the Liberal Industrial Inquiry, and later serving on a committee of the Board of Trade.

From 1943 until 1946, Gilpin was the Chairman of the Liberal Party, a period which included the party's poor result at the 1945 general election. Gilpin was knighted in 1949, and died the following year.
