= Fanny by Gaslight (film) =

1944 British film starring James Mason

- UK promotional poster
- Directed by: Anthony Asquith
- Written by: Doreen Montgomery additional dialogue Aimée Stuart
- Based on: Fanny by Gaslight by Michael Sadleir
- Produced by: Edward Black
- Starring: Phyllis Calvert; James Mason; Wilfrid Lawson; Stewart Granger; Margaretta Scott; Jean Kent; John Laurie; Stuart Lindsell; Nora Swinburne; Amy Veness; Ann Wilton; Helen Haye; Cathleen Nesbitt; John Turnbull; Helen Goss
- Cinematography: Arthur Crabtree
- Edited by: R. E. Dearing
- Music by: Cedric Mallabey
- Production company: Gainsborough Pictures
- Distributed by: General Film Distributors
- Release dates: May 1944 (UK); 1946 (France); 1948 (USA)
- Running time: 107 minutes
- Country: United Kingdom
- Language: English
- Budget: £90,000
- Box office: $17,285 (US rentals) £300,000 (UK); 786,581 admissions (France)

Fanny by Gaslight (US title – Man of Evil) is a 1944 British drama film, directed by Anthony Asquith and starring Phyllis Calvert, James Mason, Wilfrid Lawson and Stewart Granger. It was adapted by Doreen Montgomery and Aimée Stuart from the 1940 novel by Michael Sadleir (also later adapted as a 1981 TV serial).

It was the second of Gainsborough Pictures' period-set "Gainsborough melodramas", following The Man in Grey (1943).

Stewart Granger later said he "didn't like" the film because of its "drippy characters" but thought "Asquith was much the best of those directors I worked with at Gainsborough."

== Plot ==
The story unfolds in 1870s Victorian London. Fanny is only nine years old and is in the street with her young friend. They wander down to a basement, which appears to be a brothel and nightclub (Hopwood Shades). She is given a coin and then pulled out by Joe, her father's handyman. Back at home she is having a birthday party by her father. Her mother and father decide to send her away to boarding school.

We jump to her birthday in 1880, Fanny has finished at boarding school and returns to London. It is clearer that her father owns and runs the nearby nightclub and brothel and has a secret door in his house that links down to it. However he has no desire for his daughter to be involved in any way with the business. Only when her father is killed in a fight with Lord Manderstoke, is it revealed to her at the inquest that her father ran a brothel.

She is sent to work for the Heaviside/Seymore family far from her home. The husband Clive Seymore reveals he is her true father and he paid William Hopwood to look after her (it is implied he was a client). She is introduced to other servants as Mrs Heaviside's niece and given the name Fanny Hooper. Her father takes her on holiday and gets to know her and wants to tell the world that she is his daughter.

In the idyllic countryside during the holiday she is painting by the lake when a dog spoils her picture. The dog belongs to Harry Somerford, with whom she chats.

Back in the mansion where they stay the dog appears at her door. She looks out of the window and Harry is talking business with her father. He is a young friend of the father, who then has to return to London without her. She is now calling him "father".

Back at the huge Seymore house she returns to duties as a maid. One day a visitor Lord Manderstoke encounters her on the stair and recognises her as Hopwood's daughter. He is revealed as the lover of Mrs Seymore.

Mr Seymore reveals to his wife that Fanny is his daughter. She asks for a divorce to marry Manderstoke. Mr Seymore commits suicide rather than face disgrace.

Fanny leaves and goes back to home territory. Somerford is trustee to Mr Seymore's will and delivers property shares to Fanny. A letter reveals that Fanny was Seymore's daughter and also that he loved Somerford like a son.

Somerford's sister comes and tells her Somerford wants to marry her but it must not happen as it will ruin his reputation. Somerford appears and asks her to marry him.

In the final scene Somerford has been shot in the chest and Fanny and a physician are caring for him. The sister again appears and demands to take him into her own care. This could be fatal but the sister says she would rather he die than be with Fanny. He chooses to live.

== Cast ==
- Phyllis Calvert as Fanny Hopwood / Fanny Hooper
- James Mason as Lord Manderstoke
- Wilfrid Lawson as Chunks
- Stewart Granger as Harry Somerford
- Jean Kent as Lucy Beckett
- Margaretta Scott as Alicia Seymore
- Nora Swinburne as Mrs. Hopwood
- Cathleen Nesbitt as Kate Somerford
- Helen Haye as Mrs. Somerford
- John Laurie as William Hopwood
- Stuart Lindsell as Clive Seymore
- Amy Veness as Mrs. Heaviside
- Ann Wilton as Miss Carver
- Esma Cannon as gossiping maid (uncredited)
- Shelagh Fraser as maid (uncredited)
- Ann Stephens as Fanny as a child
- John Turnbull as magistrate
- Cyril Smith as publican
- Helen Goss as Polly
- Johnnie Schofield as Joe Fox ("Jugs")
- Vi Kaley as Joe's wife

== Production ==
Phyllis Calvert and Anthony Asquith were attached to the project by October 1942. It was one of the last films Edward Black made at Gainsborough.

The film's release in the US was delayed over three years due to American censor concerns over scenes set in a brothel.

== Reception ==
The BFI listed it as one of the most popular British films of all time, with an estimated attendance of 11.7 million.

According to Kinematograph Weekly it was the biggest hit at the British box office in June 1944 and became "one of the biggest and best money spinners of the year." However, it performed badly at the box office in the US.

The Monthly Film Bulletin wrote: "This is a polite version by Doreen Montgomery of the Michael Sadleir novel. With meticulous period work, the production departments have achieved highly. The Asquith directing is clean cut, sure and sensitively evocative of his period atmosphere – evocative, too, of unusually fine work from practically every member of a well-chosen cast. Phyllis Calvert, as Fanny, is gentle but capable of determined action in the interests of her love."

Variety wrote: "Anthony Asquith's direction is hurt by the inevitable faulty film editing and irritatingly slow tempo. Although the script distorts the original story almost beyond recognition, there is still retained a lot of plot development in the house of ill-fame, which in the book is the main background. Hays organization may temper some of these sequences, if and when it reaches the American market. ... With so many good performances, it is significant that Phyllis Calvert in the lead more than holds her own."

== Analysis ==
The film deals with themes of illegitimacy, social class, blackmail and duelling.

== Bibliography ==
- MacFarlane, B. (1997) An Autobiography of British Cinema, Methuen. ISBN 0413726703.
- Reeves, N. (2003) The power of film propaganda: myth or reality?, Continuum: London. ISBN 9780826473905.
