= Michael Sadler (educationist) =

English historian and administrator (1861–1943)

Sir Michael Ernest Sadler KCSI CB
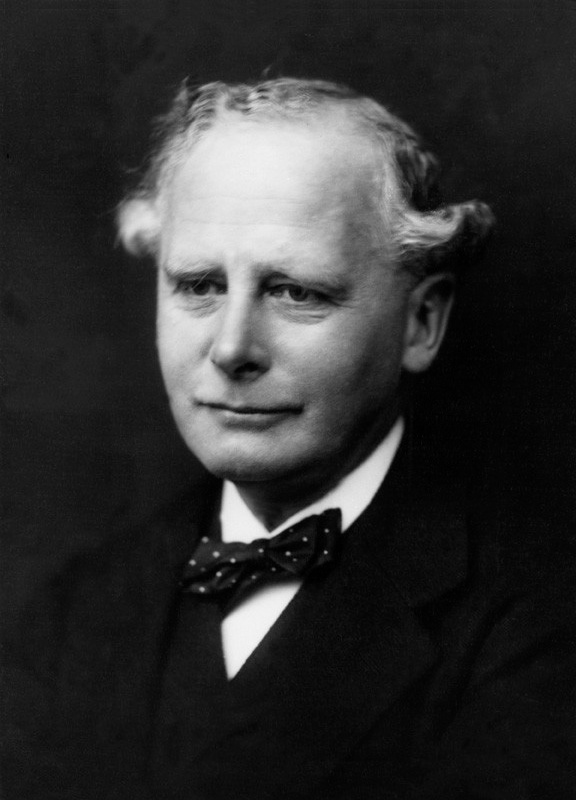
- Sadler in 1914
- Born: 3 July 1861; Barnsley, England
- Died: 14 October 1943 (aged 82); Oxford, England
- Occupation: Writer
- Spouses: Mary Ann Harvey (m. 1885; died 1931) Eva Margaret Gilpin (m. 1934; died 1940)
- Children: Michael Sadleir
- Writing career
- Subject: Education

Sir Michael Ernest Sadler KCSI CB (3 July 1861 – 14 October 1943) was an English historian, educationalist and university administrator. He worked at Victoria University of Manchester and was the vice-chancellor of the University of Leeds. He was also a champion of the English public school system.

== Early life and education ==
Michael Ernest Sadler, born into a radical home in 1861 at Barnsley in the industrial north of England, died in Oxford in 1943.

His early youth was coloured by the fact that one of his forebears, Michael Thomas Sadler, was among the pioneers of the Factory Acts. His early memories were full of associations with leaders of the working-class movement in the north of England. Remembering these pioneers, Sadler recorded: "I can see how much religion deepened their insight and steadied their judgement, and saved them from coarse materialism in their judgement of economic values. This common heritage was a bond of social union. A social tradition is the matrix of education."

Sadler's schooling was typical of his times. It gave him a diverse background, which was reflected throughout his life in his interpretation of the process and content of education. When he was 10 years old, he was sent to a private boarding school at Winchester, where the atmosphere was markedly conservative. Sadler recalls:

Think of the effect on my mind of being swung from the Radical West Riding... where I never heard the Conservative point of view properly put, to where I was thrown into an entirely new atmosphere in which the old Conservative and Anglican traditions were still strong.

From this preparatory school he moved to Rugby in the English Midlands, where he spent his adolescence in an atmosphere entirely different from that of the Winchester school. His masters were enthusiastic upholders of Oliver Cromwell and the Puritan Revolution. The young Sadler soon found himself in critical revolt against the Cavalier and Anglican traditions.

He went to Trinity College, Oxford in 1880. There he soon came under the spell of leading historians such as T. H. Green and Arnold Toynbee, but it was John Ruskin who overwhelmed him as an undergraduate. Sadler has left on record how, in his second year at Trinity, a short course of lectures by Ruskin was announced, to be given in the Oxford University Museum. Tickets were hard to get because of the popularity of the speaker. After a warm description of Ruskin's picturesque appearance, Sadler expresses a favourite conviction:

Nominally these lectures of Ruskin's were upon Art. Really they dealt with the economic and spiritual problems of English national life. He believed, and he made us believe, that every lasting influence in an educational system requires an economic structure of society in harmony with its ethical ideal.

That belief persisted to the end of Sadler's life and is recurrent in his many analyses of foreign systems of education. When, in July 1882, the examinations lists were issued, Sadler had gained a first-class degree in Literae Humaniores. A month earlier he had become president elect of the Oxford Union, a field of public debating experience that has produced many English politicians.

== Career ==
In 1885, he was elected secretary of Oxford's Extensions Lectures Sub-Committee, providing outreach lectures. He was a "student" (the equivalent of a fellow) at Christ Church, Oxford from 1890 to 1895. In 1895, he was appointed to a government post as director of the Office of Special Inquiries and Reports, resigning from the board of education in 1903. A special professorship in history and administration of education was created for him at the University of Manchester, where he was impressed by the work of the educational theorist Catherine Isabella Dodd and her experimental school.

He became vice-chancellor of the University of Leeds in 1911, where he now has a building named after him, and returned to Oxford in 1923 as master of University College, Oxford. There he continued to influence national educational policy and promote the work of various modernist artists.

== Leeds Arts Club ==
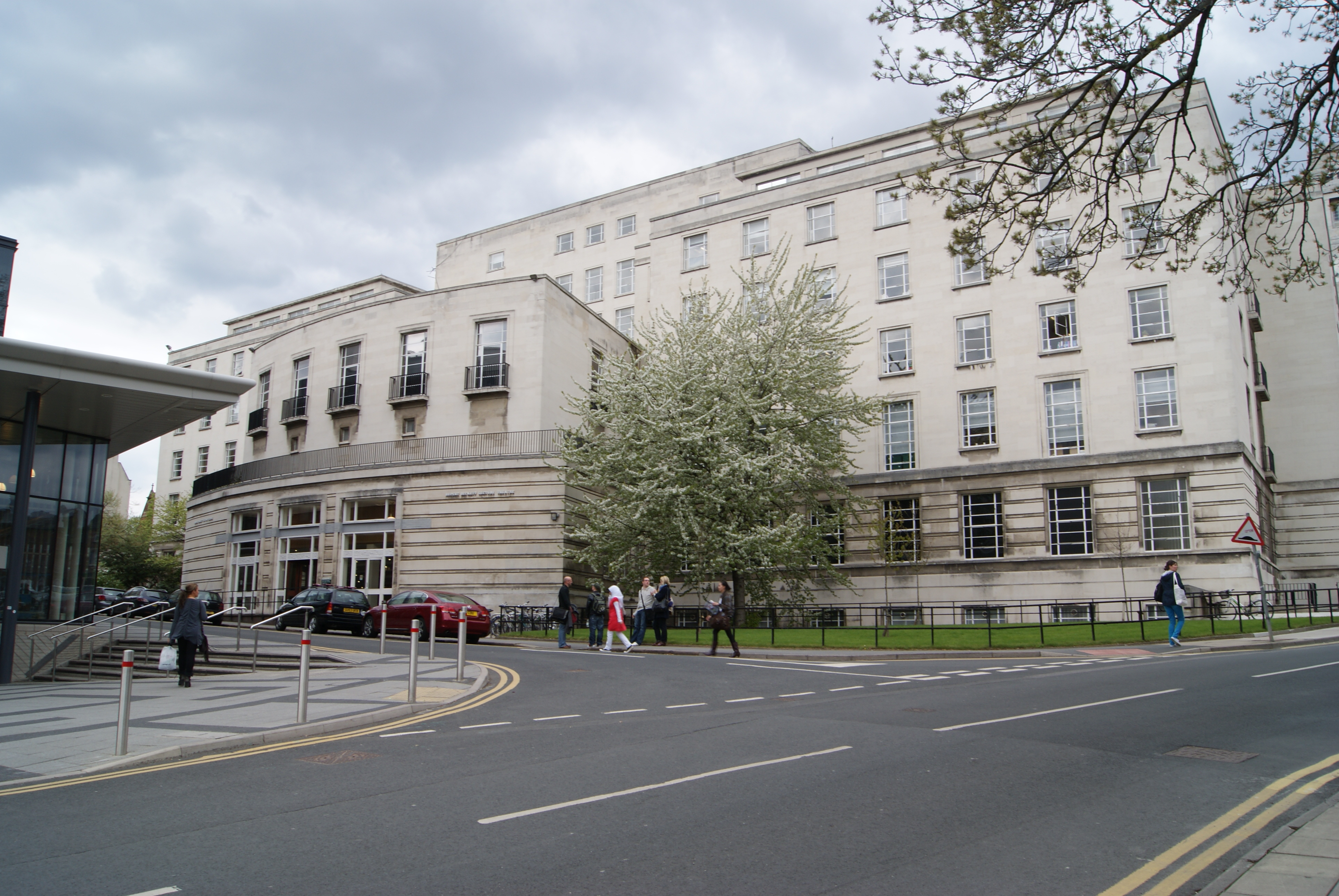
The Michael Sadler building at the University of Leeds was named in his honour.

Whilst in Leeds, Sadler became president of the avant-garde modernist cultural group the Leeds Arts Club. Founded in 1903 by Alfred Orage, the Leeds Arts Club was an important meeting ground for radical artists, thinkers, educationalists and writers in Britain, and had strong leanings to the cultural, political and theoretical ideas coming out of Germany at this time.

Using his personal links with Wassily Kandinsky in Munich, Sadler built up a remarkable collection of expressionist and abstract expressionist art at a time when such art was either unknown or dismissed in London, even by well-known promoters of modernism such as Roger Fry. Most notable in his collection was Kandinsky's abstract painting Fragment for Composition VII, of 1912, a painting that was in Leeds and on display at the Leeds Arts Club in 1913. Sadler also owned Paul Gauguin's celebrated painting "The Vision After the Sermon", and according to Patrick Heron, Sadler even had Kandinsky visit Leeds before the First World War, although this claim is uncorroborated by other sources.

With Frank Rutter, Sadler also co-founded the Leeds Art Collections Fund to help Leeds City Art Gallery. In particular the aim of the Fund was to bypass the financial restraints placed on the gallery by the municipal authorities in Leeds, who had, in the opinion of Sadler, a dislike of modern art.

== The Sadler Commission ==
In 1917 to 1919, Sadler led the "Sadler Commission" which looked at the state of Indian Education.

Towards the end of the First World War, the Secretary of State for India, Austen Chamberlain, invited Sadler to accept the chairmanship of a commission the government proposed to appoint to inquire into the affairs of the University of Calcutta. Chamberlain wrote: "Lord Chelmsford [the Viceroy] informs me that they hope for the solution of the big political problems of India through the solution of the educational problems." After some hesitation, Sadler accepted the invitation. Under his direction the Commission far exceeded its initial terms of reference. The result was 13 volumes issued in 1919, providing a comprehensive sociological account of the context in which Mahatma Gandhi was campaigning for the end of the British Raj and the independence of India. The lines of inquiry pursued make it possible to deduce a concept of expanding higher education that goes far beyond the traditional university image in its search to relate higher education to the 20th century, along with its increasing availability of educational opportunities to women. Sir Ashutosh Mukherjee, known as the Tiger of Bengal, was a member of that commission.

Before the publication of the Calcutta University Report, Sadler delivered a private address to the Senate of the University of Bombay. He put forward his personal conclusions as he surveyed The Educational Movement in India and Britain. It was characteristic of Sadler's belief in the inter-relationship of all the various levels of education and the importance of teacher training. He warned his listeners about producing an academic proletariat with job expectations that could not be fulfilled. And finally he told the members of the Senate:

And in India you stand on the verge of the most hazardous and inevitable of adventures—the planning of primary education for the unlettered millions of a hundred various races. I doubt whether the European model will fit Indian conditions. If you want social dynamite, modern elementary education of the customary kind will give it to you. It is the agency that will put the masses in motion. But to what end or issue no one can foretell.

== Honours ==
Sadler received the honorary degree LL.D. from Columbia University in June 1902. He was awarded CB in the 1911 Coronation Honours.

In 1919, Sadler was appointed a Knight Commander of the Order of the Star of India (KCSI).

== Later life ==
From 1923 to 1934, Sadler served as Master of University College, Oxford. He collected paintings and encouraged artists.

== Personal life ==
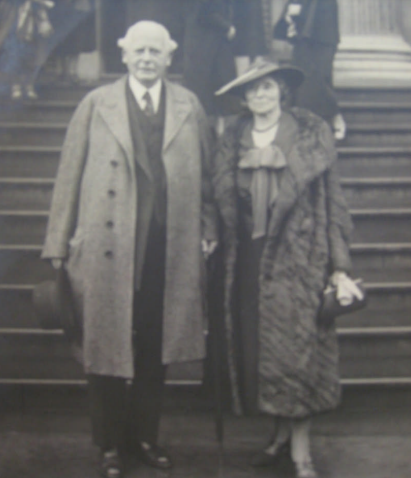
Second marriage to Eva Gilpin in 1934

Sadler married Mary Ann Harvey Sadler, "a wealthy Yorkshire heiress", in 1885. Mary, born in 1852, was the daughter of a linen manufacturer with a warehouse in Barnsley. She was his hostess at their house in Headingley, Leeds, called Buckingham House, where Sadler's Impressionist and Post-Impressionist paintings were displayed in a picture gallery, receiving many cultural figures like Roger Fry and emerging artists like Henry Moore and Jacob Kramer. Mary died in 1931 and left a legacy to the Oxford Preservation Trust. Their only child was Michael Sadleir (1888–1957), a British publisher, novelist, book collector and bibliographer.

In 1934 Sadler married Eva Margaret Gilpin (1868-1940), headmistress of Hall School, Weybridge, Surrey, who had been the governess of his son, Michael Sadleir.

Gilpin retired from the school leaving it to her niece. The two of them spent five years touring and enjoying retirement.

== See also ==
- Leeds Arts Club

== Sources ==
- The text here calls freely on the text published by UNESCO below, which "may be reproduced free of charge as long as acknowledgement is made of the source."

Academic offices
Preceded by Reginald Walter Macan	Master of University College, Oxford; 1923–1934	Succeeded by Arthur Blackburne Poynton
Preceded by Nathan Bodington	Vice-Chancellor, University of Leeds; 1911–1923	Succeeded by James Black Baillie
