= Joe Ashton =

British politician (1933–2020)

Member of Parliament for Bassetlaw
- In office 31 October 1968 – 14 May 2001
- Preceded by: Frederick Bellenger
- Succeeded by: John Mann

Personal details
- Born: Joseph William Ashton; 9 October 1933 Sheffield, England
- Died: 30 March 2020 (aged 86) Sheffield, England
- Party: Labour
- Spouse: Maggie Lee (m. 1957; died 2015)
- Children: 1

Joseph William Ashton OBE (9 October 1933 – 30 March 2020) was a British Labour Party politician who was the MP for Bassetlaw from 1968 to 2001. He took his seat in by-election, winning with a majority of just 1.72%; in his last election before retiring, he won it by a majority of 36.4%.

== Early career ==
The final form of his seat in the Commons (which includes Worksop and Retford), the northern quarter of Nottinghamshire near to Sheffield and Doncaster. He held it from 1968 until 2001

Ashton was born and brought up in Sheffield; he attended High Storrs Grammar School and Rotherham Technical College. He was an engineer, and entered electoral politics when he was elected to Sheffield City Council in 1962.

== Parliament ==
Ashton was first elected as the Member of Parliament for Bassetlaw in a by-election in 1968, when he struggled to hold the seat (which had been Labour-held since 1929) at a time when the government of Harold Wilson was unpopular. The close result saw it become a marginal seat, won by Ashton with a majority of just 740 (1.72%). The previous MP, Captain Frederick Bellenger was said to have built a personal vote through his Labour canvassing, and in the local newspapers. Having been an MP since 1935, Bellenger died mid-term in May 1968 at the age of 73. He had just been awarded the Freedom of Worksop (a town in the constituency) two days before his death.

Pit closures were an important issue in a seat with a large mining sector vote. Ashton argued that the Labour government's approach, which included redundancy payments to miners over the age of 55, was better than the terms of the Conservatives when they were in power (1951–1964). Ashton was associated with the party's left early in his career, but gradually moved away over time.

In 1977, Ashton published Grass Roots, a novel about a tough steelworker who becomes a rebellious Labour MP. During his time in parliament, he regularly contributed to newspapers as a columnist.

== Later life ==
In March 1999, Northamptonshire's Chief Constable noted that Ashton had given misleading information to officers when in the same premises of the arrests of the perpetrators of immigration and sexual offences at a Northampton Thai massage parlour. This occurred during a police raid in November 1998. He was interviewed voluntarily and not accused of committing any offence. Ashton threatened to raise a data protection complaint. The police robustly denied that it had leaked Ashton's name; their statement said, "there were a great many other people with knowledge of this case - defendants, witnesses, legal representatives, other organisations and other individuals." A director of Sheffield Wednesday football club since 1990, he resigned as a director shortly after his presence at the parlour was established.

Following his retirement at the 2001 general election, he was succeeded by John Mann. In 2007, Ashton was appointed an OBE.

Ashton was interviewed in 2012 as part of The History of Parliament's oral history project. His memoir, Red Rose Blues, was published in 2000. He published two volumes of memoirs in 2010 and 2014.

== Personal life and death ==
In 1957, Ashton married Margaret Patricia (Maggie) Lee; they were married until her death in 2015, and had one daughter.

Ashton died from dementia at a care home in Sheffield on 30 March 2020, at the age of 86.

Parliament of the United Kingdom
Preceded by Frederick Bellenger	Member of Parliament for Bassetlaw; 1968–2001	Succeeded by John Mann
