= Eva Gilpin =

Lady Sadler
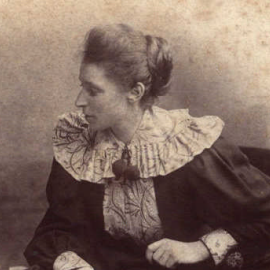
- Eva Gilpin in about 1892
- Born: Eva Margaret Gilpin; 25 March 1868; Nottingham, England
- Died: 23 September 1940 (aged 72); Headington, England
- Occupations: goveress and headteacher
- Known for: founding a school with a novel approach to learning
- Spouse: Sir Michael Sadler

Eva Margaret Gilpin, known as Lady Sadler upon her marriage, (25 March 1868 – 23 September 1940) was a British headmistress and educationist. She founded the Hall school in Weybridge.

== Life ==
Gilpin was born in Nottingham in 1868. Her Quaker parents were Margaret (born Binns) and Edmund Octavius Gilpin. Her family had several notable members including her younger brother Harry Gilpin. She was given a Quaker education at Ackworth School where there was learning tracts and the art classes concentrated on the means of production.

She was a teacher in London but she left that to go to Yorkshire in 1892 where she was to be the governess of five of William and Anna Harvey's children in Ilkley. The Harvey's were her cousins. Her class expanded when Michael Sadler came to visit and he and his wife, Mary, decided to leave their son under her care during term time. She was in Ilkley for three years until in 1895 she moved to the Sadler's household in Weybridge. Her ambition was to found a school and in 1898 the Village Hall School started in Weybridge's village Hall. In time it would be called The Hall School. The school expanded as Sadler lauded the school and her approach. Two years after the school was founded she was able to buy a house of her own. It is possible that the Sadlers kept the school running. The decorations of the walls of the school included a painting by Paul Gauguin which they had lent.

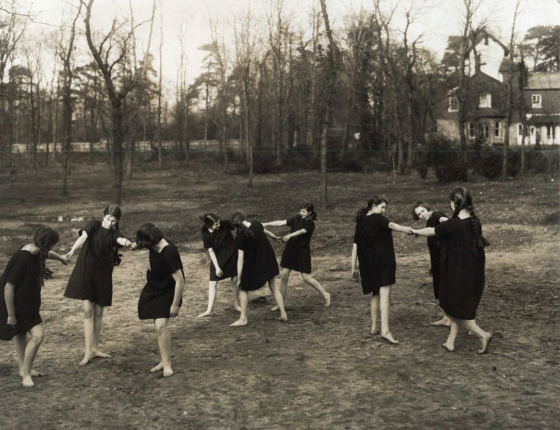
Dance in the Hall School in Weybridge

Her school had a novel approach. The pupil would learn expressive dance and they had their own parliament. She introduced lino cutting to the school and soon the whole school was involved in creating a limited edition publication.

Gilpin died in 1940 at her home in Headington. The year before "her" school had moved to Bratton Seymour in Somerset because of the war. The school remained there until it was closed in 1983.
