= William Howie, Baron Howie of Troon =

British politician

The Right Honourable The Lord Howie of Troon
- Howie in the House of Lords in 2015

Member of the House of Lords
- Lord Temporal
- Life peerage 21 April 1978 – 26 May 2018

Comptroller of the Household
- In office 1967–1968
- Prime Minister: Harold Wilson
- Preceded by: William Whitlock
- Succeeded by: Ioan Evans

Member of Parliament for Luton
- In office 7 November 1963 – 29 May 1970
- Preceded by: Charles Hill
- Succeeded by: Charles Simeons

Personal details
- Born: 2 March 1924
- Died: 26 May 2018 (aged 94)
- Party: Labour

William Howie, Baron Howie of Troon (2 March 1924 – 26 May 2018), known as Will Howie, was a British Labour Party politician and Member of Parliament (MP).

Howie was elected to the House of Commons at a 1963 by-election in the Luton constituency, following the appointment of Conservative MP Charles Hill as chairman of the Independent Television Authority. He was re-elected at the 1964 general election with a majority of only 723 votes.

He held his seat at the 1966 election with an increased majority of 2,464, but at the 1970 general election he lost his seat to the Conservative Charles Simeons.

On 21 April 1978, he was made a life peer as Baron Howie of Troon, of Troon in the District of Kyle and Carrick.

On 17 July 2007 it was revealed that Howie provided a parliamentary security pass to Douglas Smith, Chairman of the lobbying group Westminster Advisers.

Parliament of the United Kingdom
Preceded by Charles Hill	Member of Parliament for Luton; 1963–1970	Succeeded by Charles Simeons
Political offices
Preceded by William Whitlock	Comptroller of the Household; 1967–1968	Succeeded by Ioan Evans
