= Michael Sadleir =

British publisher, novelist, book collector, and bibliographer (1888–1957)

- Born: Michael Thomas Harvey Sadler; 25 December 1888; Oxford, England
- Died: 13 December 1957 (aged 68); The London Clinic, London, England
- Education: Balliol College, Oxford
- Occupations: Writer; novelist; publisher
- Spouse: Edith "Betty" Tupper-Carey (1914–his death)
- Children: Ann Penelope Hornby (née Sadler); Michael Thomas Carey Sadler; Richard Ferribee Sadler
- Parent: Sir Michael Ernest Sadler (father)
- Relatives: Mary Ann Harvey (mother)
- Writing career
- Period: 20th century
- Genres: History; fiction

Michael Sadleir (25 December 1888 – 13 December 1957), born Michael Thomas Harvey Sadler, was a British publisher, novelist, book collector, and bibliographer.

== Biography ==
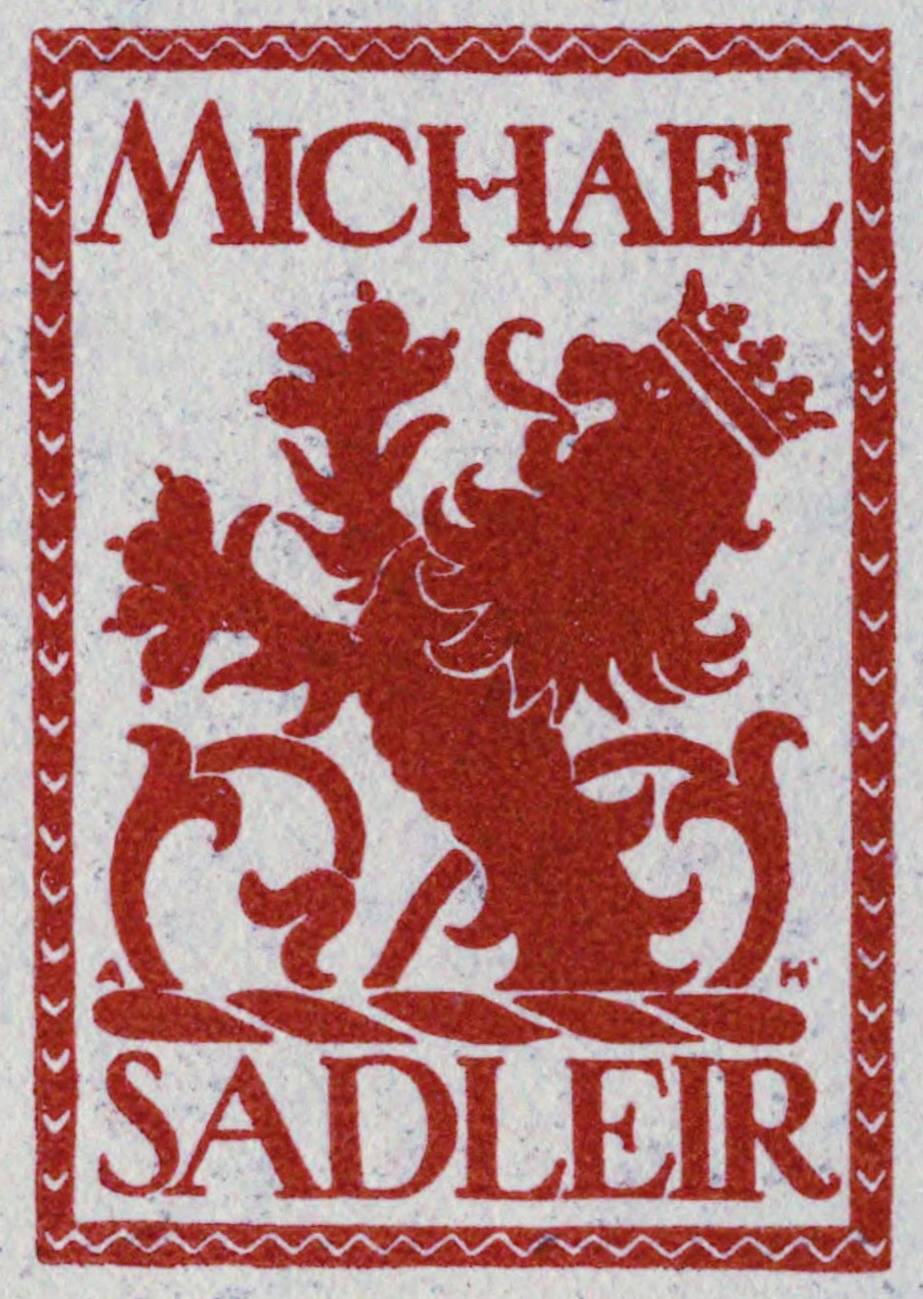
Bookplate of Michael Sadleir

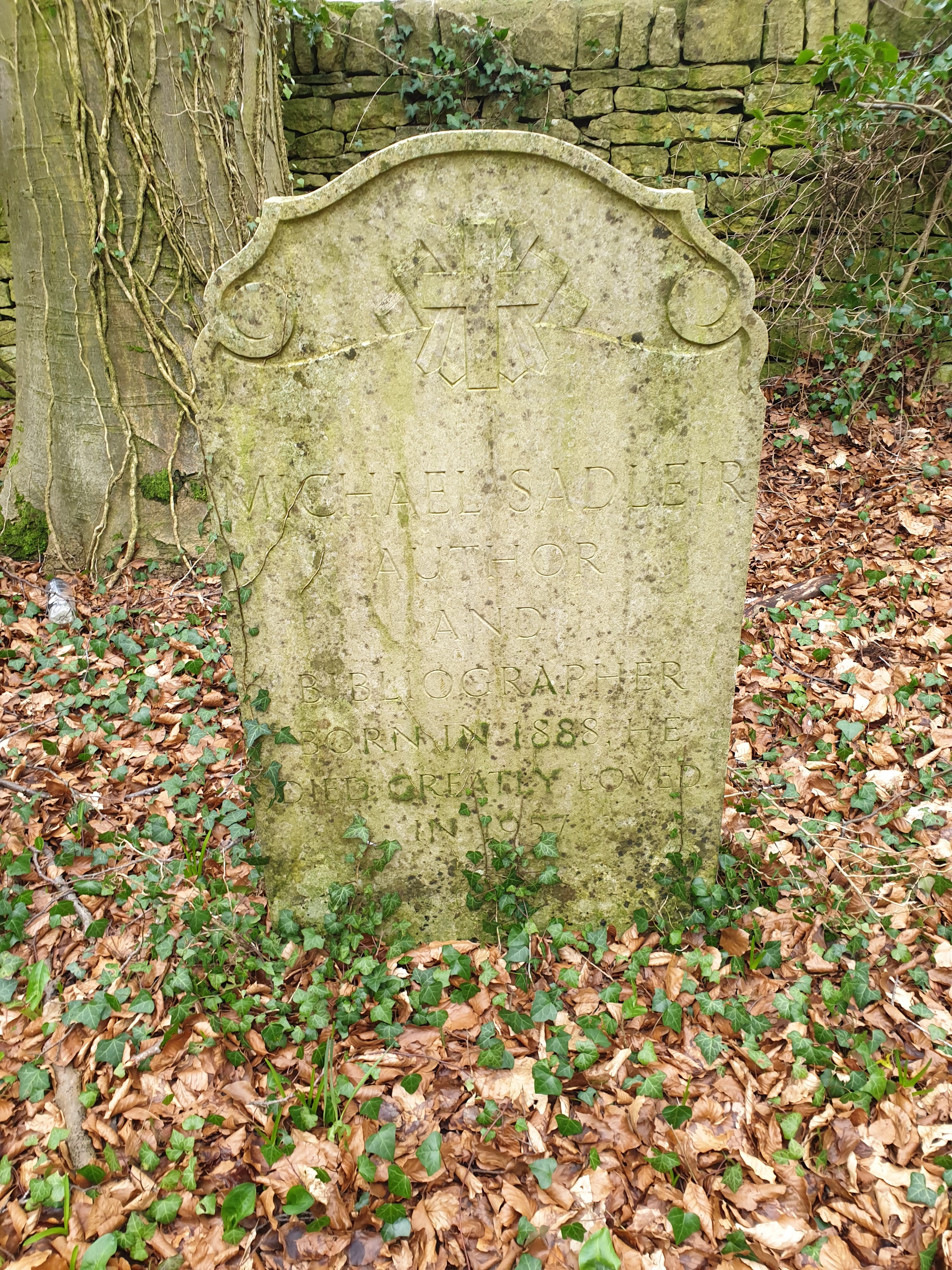
Michael Sadleir's grave and memorial at Bisley Burial Ground, Bisley, Gloucestershire, England

Michael Sadleir was born in Oxford, England, the son of Sir Michael Ernest Sadler and Mary Sadler. He adopted the older variant of his surname to differentiate himself from his father, a historian, educationist, and Vice-Chancellor of the University of Leeds. Sadleir was initially taught by Eva Gilpin in Ilkley before he was educated at Rugby School and was a contemporary of Rupert Brooke, with whom he was romantically involved, and Geoffrey Keynes.

Sadleir then attended Balliol College, Oxford, where he read history and won the 1912 Stanhope essay prize on the political career of Richard Brinsley Sheridan. Before the First World War, Sadleir and his father were keen collectors of art, and purchased works by young English artists such as Stanley Spencer and Mark Gertler. They were amongst the first collectors (and certainly the first English collectors) of the paintings of the Russian-born German Expressionist artist Wassily Kandinsky. In 1913, both Sadleir and his father travelled to Germany to meet Kandinsky in Munich. This visit led to Sadleir translating into English Kandinsky's seminal written work on expressionism, Concerning the Spiritual in Art in 1914. This was one of the first coherent arguments for abstract art in the English language and the translation by Sadleir was seen as both crucial to understanding Kandinsky's theories about abstract art and as a key text in the history of modernism. Extracts from it were published in the Vorticist literary magazine BLAST in 1914, and it remained one of the most influential art texts of the first decades of the twentieth century.

Sadleir began to work for the publishing firm of Constable & Co. in 1912, becoming a director in 1920, and chairman in 1954. In 1920 as editor of Bliss and Other Stories by Katherine Mansfield for Constable he insisted on censoring sections of her short story Je ne parle pas français which show the cynical attitudes to love and sex of the narrator. Her husband John Middleton Murry persuaded Sadleir to reduce the cuts slightly (Murry and Sadleir had founded the avant-garde quarterly Rhythm in 1912).

After the end of World War I, he served as a British delegate to the Paris Peace Conference, 1919, and worked at the secretariat of the newly formed League of Nations.

As a literary historian, he specialised in 19th-century English fiction, notably the work of Anthony Trollope. Together with Ian Fleming and others, Sadleir was a director and contributor to The Book Handbook, later renamed The Book Collector, published by Queen Anne Press.

He also conducted research on Gothic fiction and discovered rare original editions of the Northanger Horrid Novels mentioned in the novel Northanger Abbey by Jane Austen. Beforehand, some of these books, with their lurid titles, were thought to be figments of Austen's imagination. Sadleir and Montague Summers demonstrated that they did really exist.

In 1937, he was the Sandars Reader in Bibliography at Cambridge University, on the subject of the "Bibliographical Aspects of the Victorian Novel".

He was President of the Bibliographical Society from 1944 to 1946.

Sadleir's best-known novel was Fanny by Gaslight (1940), a fictional exploration of prostitution in Victorian London. It was adapted under that name as a 1944 film. The 1947 novel Forlorn Sunset further explored the characters of the Victorian London underworld. His writings also include a biography of his father, published in 1949, and a privately published memoir of one of his sons, who was killed in World War II.

The remarkable collection of Victorian fiction compiled by Sadleir, now at the UCLA Department of Special Collections, is the subject of a catalogue published in 1951. His collection of Gothic fiction is at the University of Virginia Albert and Shirley Small Special Collections Library.

Sadleir lived at Througham Court, Bisley, in Gloucestershire, a fine Jacobean farmhouse altered for him by the architect Norman Jewson, c. 1929. He sold Througham Court in 1949 and moved to Willow Farm, Oakley Green, in Berkshire.

== Bibliography ==
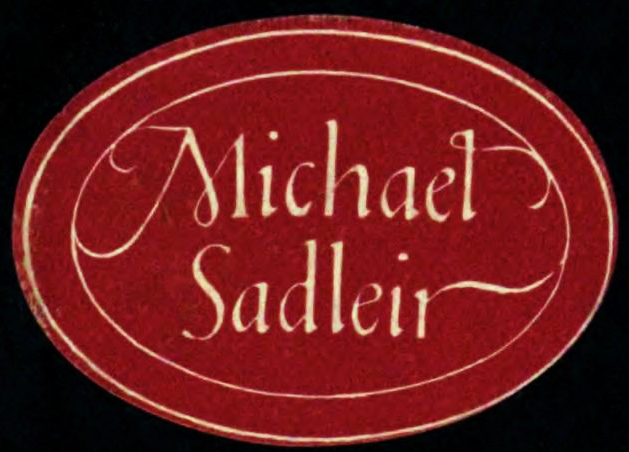
Michael Sadleir book sticker

- Privilege: A Novel of the Transition (New York and London: G. P. Putnam's Sons, 1921) (The Knickerbocker Library)
- Excursions in Victorian Bibliography (London: Chaundy & Cox, 1922)
- Daumier: The Man and the Artist (London, Halton & Truscott Smith, Ltd., 1924)
- Desolate Splendour (1923)
- The Noblest Frailty (1925)
- Trollope: A Commentary (1927; revised American edition, 1947)
- Trollope: A Bibliography (London: Dawsons of Pall Mall, 1928)
- The Northanger Novels (London: The English Association, 1927) (Pamphlet No. 68)
- Evolution of Publishers' Binding Styles (1930)
- Bulwer and His Wife: A Panorama, 1803-1836 (London: Constable & Co. Ltd., 1931)
- Authors and Publishers: A Study in Mutual Esteem (1932)
- Blessington D'Orsay: A Masquerade (1933)
- Archdeacon Francis Wrangham (1937)
- These Foolish Things (London: Constable, 1937)
- Collecting "Yellowbacks", (London: Constable & Co., 1938) (Aspects of Book-Collecting series).
- Fanny by Gaslight (London: Constable & Co., 1940; New York: Penguin Books, 1981)
- Things Past (London: Constable, 1944)
- Forlorn Sunset (London: Constable, 1947)
- XIX Century Fiction: A Bibliographical Record (Constable & Co. and University of California Press, 1951)
- The Sadleir Library (1955)

== See also ==
- Leeds Arts Club
- Bibliographical Society
