= Fanny by Gaslight (novel) =

1940 novel by Michael Sadleir

- First ed. cover
- Author: Michael Sadleir
- Language: English
- Publisher: Constable & Co.
- Publication date: 1940 (first edition)
- Publication place: United Kingdom
- Media type: Print
- Pages: 371 p.
- OCLC: 806410852

Fanny by Gaslight is a 1940 novel by the English author Michael Sadleir.

Sadleir's best-known work, it is a fictional exploration of prostitution in Victorian London. It has been adapted several times, most notably in a 1944 Gainsborough Pictures film of the same name starring Phyllis Calvert, and a 1981 four-part BBC television series with Chloe Salaman in the title role.

== Story ==
Fanny By Gaslight is written in the narrative form of alternating person. Initially set in France (in the fictional Île-de-France village of Les Yvelines-la-Carriére) in the 1930s, and written in the third person, it tells of an encounter between a middle-aged book publisher, Gerald Warbeck, and an elderly lady whom he first assumes is called Mme Oupére, but discovers is English, and called Hooper. He becomes intrigued by how she ended up in a provincial French backwater, and persuades her to tell him her story.

The narrative then moves to the first person of Fanny Hooper. It begins with her describing her childhood in London during the 1860s with her mother and stepfather, who ran a tavern called "The Happy Warrior" in Panton Street, off Leicester Square. Below the tavern, her stepfather (called Hopwood) also ran a brothel, known as "Hopwood's Hades". Hopwood is eventually framed for murder by a customer, Lord Manderstoke (unquestionably the villain of the novel) and sentenced to prison, where he dies. Fanny's mother returns to her family home in Yorkshire, and places Fanny — now fourteen — in the care of family friends the Becketts, where she befriends their daughter Lucy. Fanny's mother discloses to her that her natural father is Clive Seymore, the son of a wealthy landowner in Yorkshire, and Fanny begins work in the Seymore household in London, where only she and Seymore — but not Seymore's glamorous and rather wanton wife Lady Alicia — know the truth about who she is. Lucy begins work in an apparently exclusive dress-shop (ultimately frequented by Lady Alicia) which is itself a front for a high-class brothel. Discovering Lady Alicia's faithlessness, but terrified that she suspects the truth about Fanny being Seymore's illegitimate daughter, Fanny escapes the Seymore household to another tavern, this one in Islington run by a former employee of her stepfather called Chunks. After working as a barmaid there she moves to the employ of Kitty Cairns, helping her manage a brothel near Regent's Park.

At this point the narrative moves to the first person of Harry Somerford (although we later realise this is merely a device Warbeck has decided to use in the re-telling of Fanny's story). Harry is a frequent client of Kitty Cairns, and here he meets Fanny, and they fall in love. She is reluctant to marry him immediately, partly because their relationship is complicated by Fanny's father being Harry's superior at work. Whilst out on an evening with Lucy, who is now a chorus-girl, Harry and Fanny encounter Manderstoke, who makes a pass at Lucy before Harry knocks him out cold. They contrive to get Lucy away from London and out of Manderstoke's reach.

Switching back to Fanny as narrator, the couple enjoy a holiday in France, where they stumble upon the idyllic setting of Les Yvelines. Returning to Paris, they discover Lucy, now appearing in an erotic tableau vivant. To their horror, they find she has fallen in with Manderstoke, and he and Harry agree to a duel to settle their differences. Harry is wounded, ultimately fatally, but not before Fanny reveals to him that she is carrying his child.

The narrative concludes in the third person again, with Warbeck agreeing to write Fanny's biography, but before it is published, Fanny dies. Warbeck carries out her final wish that she and Harry be memorialised in Les Yvelines. The novel ends with the words on their memorial: Il n'y a pas de silence plus docile que le silence de l'amour. Croyez-vous que j'ai soif d'une parole sublime lorsque je sens qu'une âme me regarde dans l'âme?
