= Politics in Luton =

Local politics of Luton, a large town in Bedfordshire, England

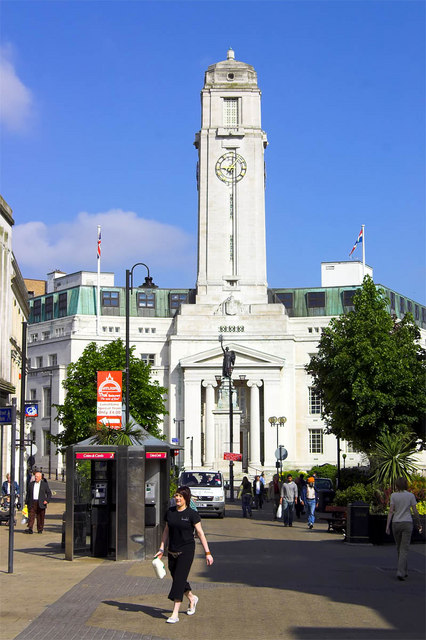
Luton Town Hall

Luton, England, is a unitary authority, and remains part of the ceremonial county of Bedfordshire. Luton is represented by 48 councillors of the Luton Borough Council, the Bedfordshire Police and crime commissioner, and two MPs in the constituencies of Luton North and Luton South and South Bedfordshire.

Between 1999 and 2010, Luton was additionally represented by the East of England Regional Assembly.

== History ==
Prior to the Local Government Act 1972, Luton had been a county borough, but still part of the county of Bedfordshire. With the abolition of the county boroughs, Luton was fully integrated into Bedfordshire and its county council. In 1992, the Local Government Commission for England, recommended that Luton be made into a unitary authority and be separate of the county council. The government agreed and this was enforced from 1997 onwards.

Luton remains part of Bedfordshire for ceremonial purposes and one Lord Lieutenant serves for the whole ceremonial county.

== Luton Borough Council ==
Luton Borough Council
- Type: Unitary authority
- Founded: 1997
- Headquarters: Luton, Bedfordshire
- Website: www.luton.gov.uk

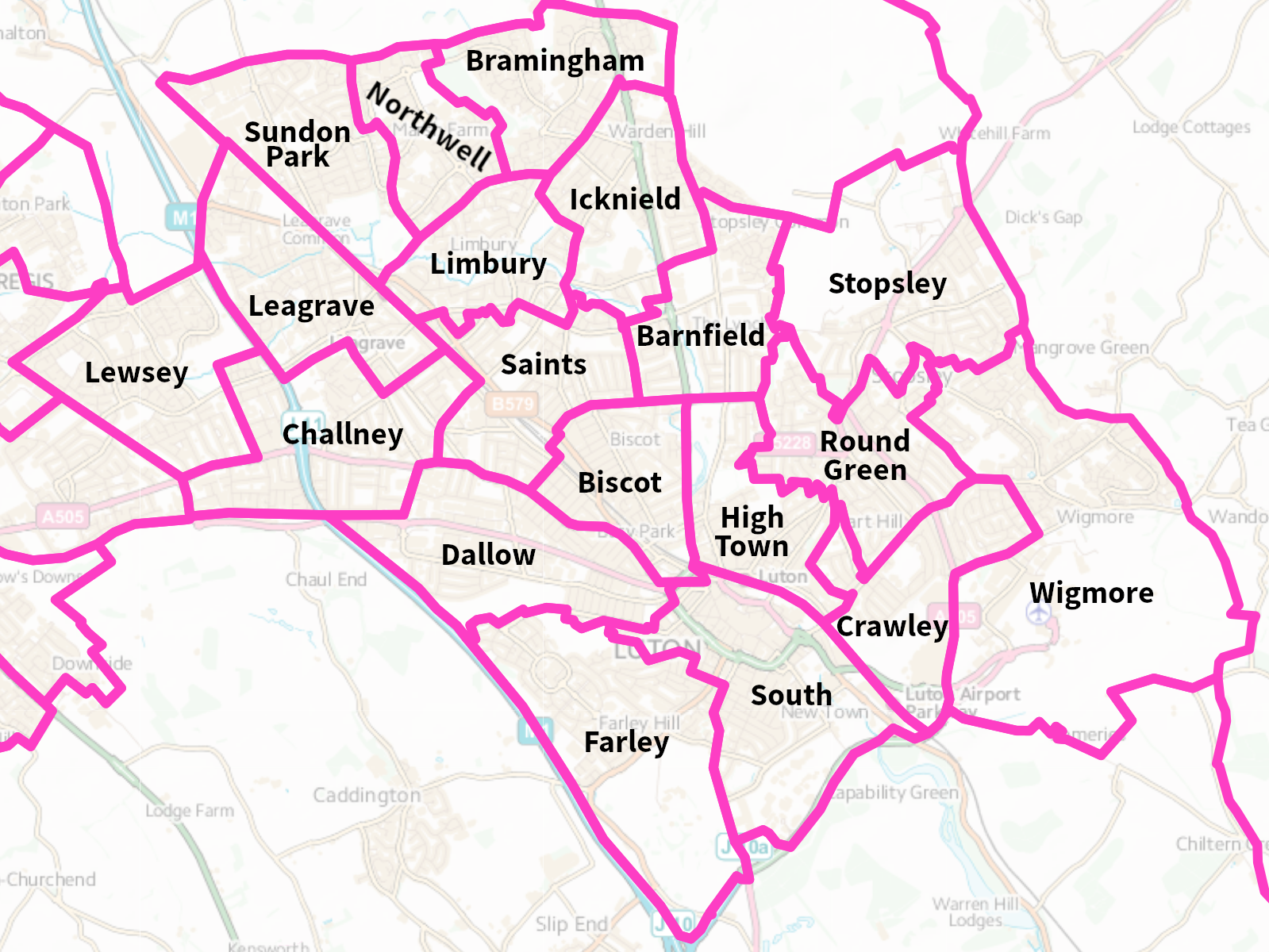
A map of Luton's 19 wards

As of 2024, Luton Borough Council is represented by 48 councillors across 20 wards. The council offices are centred on the Town Hall on George Street, Luton.

=== Local election results ===
Luton Local Election Result 2015
Party	Seats	Gains	Losses	Net gain/loss	Seats %	Votes %	Votes	+/−
Labour	35	0	1	-1	72.9			
Liberal Democrats	8	0	0	0	16.7			
Conservative	5	1	0	+1	10.5			
Independent	0	0	0	0	0.0			

Luton Local Election Result 2011
Party	Seats	Gains	Losses	Net gain/loss	Seats %	Votes %	Votes	+/−
Labour	36	11	0	+11	75.0			
Liberal Democrats	8	0	9	-9	16.7			
Conservative	4	0	2	-2	8.3			
Independent	0	0	0	0	0.0			

Luton Local Election Result 2007
Party	Seats	Gains	Losses	Net gain/loss	Seats %	Votes %	Votes	+/−
Labour	26	5	0	+5	54.2			
Liberal Democrats	17	0	4	-4	35.4			
Conservative	5	1	0	+1	10.4			
Independent	0	0	2	-2	0.0			

NB: The make up of the council changed between 2003 and 2007, hence the apparent inconsistencies between the councillors in 2003 and the changes recorded for 2007.

Luton Local Election Result 2003
Party	Seats	Gains	Losses	Net gain/loss	Seats %	Votes %	Votes	+/−
Labour	23	0	-13	-13	47.9			
Liberal Democrats	21	11	0	11	43.8			
Conservative	4	1	0	1	8.3			
Independent	1	1	0	1	2.1			

Luton Local Election Result 1999
Party	Seats	Gains	Losses	Net gain/loss	Seats %	Votes %	Votes	+/−
Labour	36	0			75			
Liberal Democrats	9				18.8			
Conservative	3				6.3			
Independent	0				0.0			

== East of England Regional Assembly ==
Whilst not a directly elected body, the East of England Regional Assembly was responsible between 1999 and 2010 for promoting the economic, environmental and social well-being of the East England region. It was made up of representatives from councils across the region, business organisations, public sector agencies, education and training bodies, trade unions and co-operatives and the voluntary and community sector.

== Police and Crime Commissioner ==
The Police and Crime Commissioner is a Bedfordshire county-wide post. As of May 2024, the post is held by John Tizard for Labour.

== UK Parliament ==
The town of Luton historically was part of the Bedfordshire constituency which was created in 1290. In 1885, the county was redistributed into two seats, one of which was Luton, formally the Southern or Luton Division of Bedfordshire. After a Second Periodic Review of constituencies, which came into effect in February 1974, the town was divided into Luton West and Luton East.

In 1983, after the third review, the town was reorganised as Luton North and Luton South. In the 2023 review, the latter was expanded and renamed Luton South and South Bedfordshire.

=== Members of Parliament for Luton constituency ===
Election	Member	Party
1885	Cyril Flower	Liberal
1892	Samuel Howard Whitbread	
1895	Thomas Gair Ashton	Liberal
1911	Cecil Bisshopp Harmsworth	Liberal
1922	Sir John Prescott Hewett	
1923	Geoffrey William Algernon Howard	Liberal
1924	Terence James O'Connor	Unionist
1929	Edward Leslie Burgin	Liberal
1931	Edward Leslie Burgin	National Liberal
1945	William Warbey	Labour
1950	Charles Hill	Conservative
1963	William Howie	Labour
1970	Charles Simeons	Conservative
Feb 1974	Constituency abolished: see Luton East and Luton West	

=== Luton East ===
- Constituency created (1974)

Election	Member	Party
Feb. 1974	Ivor Clemitson	Labour
1979	Graham Bright	Conservative

- Constituency abolished (1983)

=== Luton West ===
- Constituency created (1974)

Election	Member	Party
Feb. 1974	Brian Sedgemore	Labour
1979	John Russell Carlisle	Conservative

- Constituency abolished (1983)

=== Luton North ===
- Constituency created (1983)

Election	Member	Party
1983	John Russell Carlisle	Conservative
1987	John Russell Carlisle	Conservative
1992	John Russell Carlisle	Conservative
1997	Kelvin Hopkins	Labour
2001	Kelvin Hopkins	Labour
2005	Kelvin Hopkins	Labour
2010	Kelvin Hopkins	Labour
2015	Kelvin Hopkins	Labour
2017	Kelvin Hopkins	Labour
2019	Sarah Owen	Labour
2024	Sarah Owen	Labour

=== Luton South ===
- Constituency created (1983)

Election	Member	Party
1983	Graham Bright	Conservative
1987	Graham Bright	Conservative
1992	Graham Bright	Conservative
1997	Margaret Moran	Labour
2001	Margaret Moran	Labour
2005	Margaret Moran	Labour
2010	Gavin Shuker	Labour
2015	Gavin Shuker	Labour
2017	Gavin Shuker	Labour
2019	Rachel Hopkins	Labour
2024	Rachel Hopkins	Labour
