= History of parliamentary constituencies and boundaries in Bedfordshire =

The ceremonial county of Bedfordshire currently comprises the unitary authorities of Bedford, Central Bedfordshire and Luton. From 1997 to 2024, it returned six MPs to the UK Parliament. Under the 2023 review of Westminster constituencies, coming into effect for the 2024 general election, the boundary commission proposed 7 constituencies, including one which is shared with the county of Hertfordshire.

== Number of seats ==
The table below shows the number of MPs representing Bedfordshire at each major redistribution of seats affecting the county.

Year	County seats^{1}	Borough seats^{1}	Total
Prior to 1885	2	2	4
1885–1918	2	1	3
1918–1950	3	0	3
1950–1974	3	1	4
1974–1983	3	2	5
1983–1997	4	1	5
1997–2024	3	3	6
2024–present	5	2	7^{2}

^{1}Prior to 1950, seats were classified as County Divisions or Parliamentary Boroughs. Since 1950, they have been classified as County or Borough Constituencies.

^{2}Includes one cross-county border constituencies shared with Hertfordshire.

== Timeline ==
County seat Borough seat

Constituency	Prior to 1885	1885–1918	1918–1950	1950–1974	1974–1983	1983–1997	1997–2024	2024–present
Bedfordshire	1290–1885 (2 MPs)							
Bedford	1295–1885 (2 MPs)	1885–1918	1918–1983				1997–present	
North Bedfordshire						1983–1997		2024–present
North East Bedfordshire							1997–2024	
Hitchin (part)								2024–present
Biggleswade		1885–1918						
Mid Bedfordshire			1918–present					
South Bedfordshire				1950–1983				
South West Bedfordshire						1983–2024		
Dunstable and Leighton Buzzard								2024–present
Luton		1885–1950		1950–1974				
Luton East					1974–1983			
Luton West					1974–1983			
Luton North						1983–1997	1997–present	
Luton South						1983–2024		
Luton South and South Bedfordshire								2024–present

== Boundary reviews ==
Prior to 1885	Since 1290, the Parliamentary County of Bedfordshire, along with all other English counties regardless of size or population, had elected two MPs (knights of the shire) to the House of Commons. The Parliamentary Borough of Bedford had also returned two MPs (burgesses) since 1295. The Reform Act 1832 radically changed the representation of the House of Commons, but Bedfordshire was one of the few counties which were unaffected by this and the county and borough both continued to elect two MPs until 1885.	
1885	Under the Redistribution of Seats Act 1885, the county was divided into 2 single-member constituencies, namely the Northern or Biggleswade Division and the Southern or Luton Division. Biggleswade covered the northern half of the county including Biggleswade, Ampthill and Kempston as well as non-resident freeholders of the Municipal Borough of Bedford. Luton covered the southern half of the county, including Leighton Buzzard and the Municipal Boroughs of Dunstable and Luton. Bedford was retained as a parliamentary borough but its representation was reduced to one MP.	Bedfordshire 1885–1918
1918	Under the Representation of the People Act 1918, the Parliamentary Borough of Bedford was replaced by a new county division of the same name, incorporating the Municipal Borough of Bedford, together with the Urban District of Kempston and the rural areas comprising the northern half of the abolished Biggleswade division. The southern areas of Biggleswade, including the urban districts of Biggleswade and Ampthill were included in a new Mid Bedfordshire Division, along with Leighton Buzzard and surrounding rural areas transferred from Luton.	Bedfordshire 1918–1950
1950	The Representation of the People Act 1948 increased the county's representation from three to four MPs with the creation of the new constituency of South Bedfordshire. This included Dunstable and the Leagrave and Limbury districts of Luton transferred from the Luton constituency, and Leighton Buzzard transferred from Mid Bedfordshire. Luton was redesignated as a Borough Constituency, comprising the remainder of the Municipal Borough. Mid Bedfordshire gained some southern and eastern rural areas of Bedford.	Bedfordshire 1950–1974
1974	Under the Second Periodic Review of Westminster Constituencies, representation was increased from four to five MPs as Luton was abolished and the municipal borough was split between the constituencies of Luton East and Luton West; the majority of the latter comprised the Leagrave and Limbury districts transferred from South Bedfordshire. There were also two minor changes due to changes to the county boundaries: South Bedfordshire gained the former Urban District of Linslade in Buckinghamshire which had been merged with that of Leighton Buzzard to form the Urban District of Leighton-Linslade; and Mid Bedfordshire lost the village of Eaton Socon which had been absorbed into the Urban District of St Neots in Huntingdonshire.	Bedfordshire 1974–1983
1983	The Third Periodic Review left the county's representation at five MPs, but saw significant changes to the constituencies, with only Mid Bedfordshire being retained. Bedford was abolished, being largely replaced by North Bedfordshire, with the exception of Kempston (transferred to Mid Bedfordshire). Luton East and Luton West were replaced by Luton South and Luton North respectively, with both of these including small parts of South Bedfordshire and Luton North (formally the County Constituency of North Luton) extending further northwards to include Flitwick from Mid Bedfordshire. South Bedfordshire was abolished and largely replaced by South West Bedfordshire, which was extended northwards to included south-western parts of Mid Bedfordshire.	Bedfordshire 1983–1997
1997	The Fourth Review resulted in a further increase to 6 MPs. Bedford was re-established as a Borough Constituency comprising the town of Bedford itself, which had contributed most of the electorate of the abolished constituency of North Bedfordshire, together with Kempston which was transferred back from Mid Bedfordshire. A new constituency of North East Bedfordshire was created, comprising the remaining (rural) areas of North Bedfordshire and northern and eastern parts of Mid Bedfordshire, including Biggleswade and Sandy, resulting in the loss of around half of its electorate. To compensate for this and the loss of Kempston, Mid Bedfordshire regained the areas previously transferred to South West Bedfordshire and gained the parts outside the Borough of Luton from Luton North (including Flitwick). The latter was redesignated as a Borough Constituency and gained the Saints ward from Luton South.	Bedfordshire 1997–2010
2010	The Fifth Review resulted in only marginal changes due to the revision of local authority wards.	Bedfordshire 2010–2024
2024	For the 2023 Periodic Review of Westminster constituencies, which redrew the constituency map ahead of the 2024 United Kingdom general election, the Boundary Commission for England opted to combine Bedfordshire with Hertfordshire as a sub-region of the East of England region, with the creation of the cross-county boundary constituency of Hitchin, which included areas previously in Mid Bedfordshire (Shefford) and North Bedfordshire (Stotfold). The village of Eaton Bray was transferred from South West Bedfordshire to Luton South and the Luton Borough ward of Stopsley from Luton South to Luton North. Other minor changes due to the revision of ward boundaries. As a result of the changes, Luton South was renamed Luton South and South Bedfordshire, North East Bedfordshire renamed North Bedfordshire, and South West Bedfordshire renamed Dunstable and Leighton Buzzard.	Bedfordshire 2024–present

== See also ==
- List of parliamentary constituencies in Bedfordshire
