= Public Administration and Constitutional Affairs Select Committee =

UK House of Commons select committee

The Public Administration and Constitutional Affairs Select Committee, previously known as the Public Administration Select Committee, is a committee designated by the British House of Commons. Its purpose is to scrutinize reports from the Parliamentary and Health Service Ombudsman, address issues pertaining to the quality of administration delivered by civil service departments, and explore various matters concerning the civil service, primarily in England and Wales, as well as constitutional affairs.

It is the principal select committee to which Cabinet Office ministers are accountable and thus handles pre appointment and accountability hearings for independent officers, with an independent civil society or cross departmental role, such as the First Civil Service Commissioner, the chair of the UK Statistics Authority and the chair of the Charity Commission.

The committee chooses its own subjects of inquiry, within its overall terms of reference; however, it seeks evidence from a wide variety of individuals and groups with relevant interests and experience. The members of the committee are elected by their peers from any political party, and the committee itself mainly publishes its results through reports and making its recommendations known to the government.

== Chairs ==
Committee chairs include those listed below.

Name	Start	End	Party	Constituency
Rhodri Morgan	16 July 1997	10 June 1999	Labour	Cardiff West
Tony Wright	15 June 1999	12 April 2010	Labour	Cannock Chase
Bernard Jenkin	10 June 2010	6 November 2019	Conservative	Harwich and North Essex
William Wragg	29 January 2020	15 April 2024	Conservative	Hazel Grove
Jackie Doyle-Price	8 May 2024	30 May 2024	Conservative	Thurrock
Simon Hoare	11 September 2024	present	Conservative	North Dorset

== Membership ==
Membership of the committee is as follows:

Member	Party	Constituency
Simon Hoare MP (Chair)	Conservative	North Dorset
Richard Baker MP	Labour	Glenrothes and Mid Fife
Markus Campbell-Savours MP	Labour	Penrith and Solway
Charlotte Cane MP	Liberal Democrats	Ely and East Cambridgeshire
Sam Carling MP	Labour	North West Cambridgeshire
Lauren Edwards MP	Labour	Rochester and Strood
Peter Lamb MP	Labour	Crawley
John Lamont MP	Conservative	Berwickshire, Roxburgh and Selkirk
Richard Quigley MP	Labour	Isle of Wight West
Luke Taylor MP	Liberal Democrats	Sutton and Cheam
Michelle Welsh MP	Labour	Sherwood Forest

=== Changes since 2024 ===
Date	Outgoing Member & Party	Constituency	→	New Member & Party	Constituency	Source
6 January 2025	John Grady MP (Labour)	Glasgow East	→	Sam Carling MP (Labour)	North West Cambridgeshire	Hansard

== 2019–2024 Parliament ==
The chair was elected on 29 January 2020, with the members of the committee being announced on 2 March 2020.

Member	Party	Constituency
William Wragg MP (chair)	Conservative (Note: Whip suspended from 9 April 2024 until resignation as chair.)	Hazel Grove
Ronnie Cowan MP	SNP	Inverclyde
Jackie Doyle-Price MP (chair)	Conservative	Thurrock
Chris Evans MP	Labour and Co-op	Islwyn
Rachel Hopkins MP	Labour	Luton South
David Jones MP	Conservative	Clwyd West
David Mundell MP	Conservative	Dumfriesshire, Clydesdale and Tweeddale
Lloyd Russell-Moyle MP	Labour	Brighton Kemptown
Tom Randall MP	Conservative	Gedling
Karin Smyth MP	Labour	Bristol South
John Stevenson MP	Conservative	Carlisle

=== Changes 2019-2024 ===
Date	Outgoing Member and Party	Constituency	→	New Member and Party	Constituency	Source
21 September 2020	Chris Evans MP (Labour and Co-op)	Islwyn	→	Navendu Mishra MP (Labour)	Stockport	Hansard
22 February 2021	Navendu Mishra MP (Labour)	Stockport	→	John McDonnell MP (Labour)	Hayes and Harlington	Hansard
17 May 2022	Rachel Hopkins MP (Labour)	Luton South	→	Beth Winter MP (Labour)	Cynon Valley	Hansard
21 November 2022	David Mundell MP (Conservative)	Dumfriesshire, Clydesdale and Tweeddale	→	Damien Moore MP (Conservative)	Southport	Hansard
6 December 2022	Jackie Doyle-Price MP (Conservative)	Thurrock	→	Jo Gideon MP (Conservative)	Stoke-on-Trent Central	Hansard
15 April 2024	William Wragg MP (Chair, Independent)	Hazel Grove	→	Vacant		Hansard
8 May 2024	Vacant		→	Jackie Doyle-Price MP (Chair, Conservative)	Thurrock	Hansard

== 2017–2019 Parliament ==
The election of the chair took place on 12 July 2017, with the members of the committee being announced on 11 September 2017.

Member	Party	Constituency
Bernard Jenkin MP (Chair)	Conservative	Harwich and North Essex
Ronnie Cowan MP	SNP	Inverclyde
Paul Flynn MP	Labour	Newport West
Marcus Fysh MP	Conservative	Yeovil
Cheryl Gillan MP	Conservative	Chesham and Amersham
Kelvin Hopkins MP	Labour	Luton North
Rupa Huq MP	Labour	Ealing Central and Acton
David Jones MP	Conservative	Clwyd West
Sandy Martin MP	Labour	Ipswich
David Morris MP	Conservative	Morecambe and Lunesdale

=== Changes 2017-2019 ===
Date	Outgoing Member and Party	Constituency	→	New Member and Party	Constituency	Source
15 January 2018	New seat		→	Sarah Champion MP (Labour)	Rotherham	Hansard
4 June 2018	Sarah Champion MP (Labour)	Rotherham	→	Tulip Siddiq MP (Labour)	Hampstead and Kilburn	Hansard
17 February 2019	Paul Flynn MP (Labour)	Newport West	→	Vacant		Death of member
25 February 2019	Sandy Martin MP (Labour)	Ipswich	→	Eleanor Smith MP (Labour)	Wolverhampton South West	Hansard

== 2015–2017 Parliament ==
The election of the chair took place on 18 June 2015, with the members of the committee being announced on 6 July 2015.

Member	Party	Constituency
Bernard Jenkin MP (Chair)	Conservative	Harwich and North Essex
Ronnie Cowan MP	SNP	Inverclyde
Oliver Dowden MP	Conservative	Hertsmere
Paul Flynn MP	Labour	Newport West
Cheryl Gillan MP	Conservative	Chesham and Amersham
Kate Hoey MP	Labour	Vauxhall
Kelvin Hopkins MP	Labour	Luton North
David Jones MP	Conservative	Clwyd West
Gerald Jones MP	Labour	Merthyr Tydfil and Rhymney
Tom Tugendhat MP	Conservative	Tonbridge and Malling
Andrew Turner MP	Conservative	Isle of Wight

=== Changes 2015-2017 ===
Date	Outgoing Member and Party	Constituency	→	New Member and Party	Constituency	Source
31 October 2016	Oliver Dowden MP (Conservative)	Hertsmere	→	Marcus Fysh MP (Conservative)	Yeovil	Hansard
31 October 2016	David Jones MP (Conservative)	Merthyr Tydfil and Rhymney	→	Adam Holloway MP (Conservative)	Gravesham	Hansard
31 October 2016	Tom Tugendhat MP (Conservative)	Tonbridge and Malling	→	Dan Poulter MP (Conservative)	Central Suffolk and North Ipswich	Hansard
19 December 2016	Adam Holloway MP (Conservative)	Gravesham	→	John Stevenson MP (Conservative)	Carlisle	Hansard

== 2010-2015 Parliament ==
The election of the chair took place on 10 June 2010, with the members of the committee being announced on 12 July 2010.

Member	Party	Constituency
Bernard Jenkin MP (Chair)	Conservative	Harwich and North Essex
Kevin Brennan MP	Labour	Cardiff West
Nick de Bois MP	Conservative	Enfield North
Michael Dugher MP	Labour	Barnsley East
Charlie Elphicke MP	Conservative	Dover
Paul Flynn MP	Labour	Newport West
Robert Halfon MP	Conservative	Harlow
Greg Mulholland MP	Liberal	Leeds North West
Charles Walker MP	Conservative	Broxbourne

=== Changes 2010-2015 ===
Date	Outgoing Member and Party	Constituency	→	New Member and Party	Constituency	Source
26 July 2010	New seat		→	David Heyes MP (Labour)	Ashton-under-Lyne	Hansard
26 July 2010	New seat		→	Jon Trickett MP (Labour)	Hemsworth	Hansard
2 November 2010	Jon Trickett MP (Labour)	Hemsworth	→	Lindsay Roy MP (Labour)	Glenrothes	Hansard
17 January 2011	Kevin Brennan MP (Labour)	Cardiff West	→	Kelvin Hopkins MP (Labour)	Luton North	Hansard
9 May 2011	Charles Walker MP (Conservative)	Broxbourne	→	Alun Cairns MP (Conservative)	Vale of Glamorgan	Hansard
5 December 2011	Nick de Bois MP (Conservative)	Enfield North	→	Priti Patel MP (Conservative)	Witham	Hansard
10 December 2012	Michael Dugher MP (Labour)	Barnsley East	→	Steve Reed MP (Labour Co-op)	Croydon North	Hansard
4 November 2013	Charlie Elphicke MP (Conservative)	Dover	→	Andrew Turner MP (Conservative)	Isle of Wight	Hansard
11 November 2013	Steve Reed MP (Labour)	Croydon North	→	Sheila Gilmore MP(Labour)	Edinburgh East	Hansard
12 May 2014	Alun Cairns MP (Conservative)	Vale of Glamorgan	→	Cheryl Gillan MP (Conservative)	Chesham and Amersham	Hansard
12 May 2014	Robert Halfon MP (Conservative)	Harlow	→	Adam Holloway MP (Conservative)	Gravesham	Hansard
23 June 2014	Priti Patel MP (Conservative)	Witham	→	Nigel Evans MP (Conservative)	Ribble Valley	Hansard

== Reports ==
A March 2004 report considered the prerogative powers of Ministers.

A major report published in July 2011 addressed procurement of Information Technology by the government and found there was an over-reliance "on a small 'oligopoly' of large suppliers", which some witnesses before the Committee had described as a 'cartel'. An independent comment given prominence in the report described the UK as "a world leader in ineffective IT schemes for government". The Office of Fair Trading investigated but did not find sufficient evidence either to confirm that suppliers had been acting in breach of competition law, or to exonerate them. The government welcomed "the Committee's interest in and support for government Information and Communication Technology" and in response noted in particular that the government was "in the process of breaking the contractual lock-in which places the majority of ICT business with a small group of major systems integrators", and "working to improve the quality of its ICT management information".

Reports published in 2021 include The role and status of the Prime Minister’s Office, published in June 2021.

In 2022 the committee reported on government ethics. Committee chair William Wragg stated a "robust" system was needed to uphold standards "with proper sanctions for those who break the rules". The committee was also concerned the government maintained its coming ethics adviser would not look into what happened round Suella Braverman's resignation. MP's on the committee stated the government should not be able to decide what the adviser, not yet appointed, could investigate. In its report, the committee also stated there should be legal action against former ministers who broke rules through taking certain jobs after leaving officed. Former ministers should look for advice from the Advisory Committee on Business Appointments but ministers cannot be made to accept this committee's advice. The record of the current government was strongly criticised. The committee want the ethics adviser to be able to carry out inquiries into historical behaviour.

== See also ==
- Parliamentary committees of the United Kingdom
