= Labour Friends of Palestine and the Middle East =

British parliamentary group

- Abbreviation: LFPME
- Formation: 2009; 17 years ago
- Location: United Kingdom
- Co-chairs: Sarah Owen and Andrew Pakes
- Affiliations: Labour Party
- Website: lfpme.co.uk

Labour Friends of Palestine and the Middle East (LFPME) is a parliamentary group within the British Labour Party that promotes support for Palestine and campaigns for "peace and justice in the Middle East through the implementation of international law and respect for human rights". LFPME was formed in 2009.

According to their website, "LFPME supports a viable two-state solution that delivers justice and freedom for the Palestinian people as called for by the overwhelming international consensus and enshrined under international law and in UN resolutions."

== History ==
Labour Friends of Palestine and the Middle East (LFPME) was established in 2009 by Sara Apps, Michelle Harris, Phyllis Starkey MP, Mark McDonald, Richard Burden MP and Martin Linton MP, at the prompting of Gerald Kaufman, an MP long involved in Palestinian affairs.

LFPME was involved in promoting the 13 October 2014 House of Commons non-binding resolution, passed by 274 to 12, for the United Kingdom to recognise the State of Palestine alongside Israel.

LFPME was re-established as a company limited by guarantee in 2023.

Prior to 2018, LFPME was chaired by Grahame Morris MP with vice-chair Andy Slaughter MP. From 2018 to 2020, it was chaired by the MP Lisa Nandy, under whom it experienced a decline in activity. From 2020 it was chaired by Julie Elliott until she stood down from parliament in 2024. In 2025, Sarah Owen MP and Andrew Pakes MP became co-chairs. The late Jo Cox was a supporter, and so is former Labour leader Jeremy Corbyn.

== Current parliamentary members ==
In the current parliament, the supporters are:

- Debbie Abrahams – Oldham East and Saddleworth
- Rushanara Ali – Bethnal Green and Stepney
- Tahir Ali – Birmingham Hall Green and Moseley
- Fleur Anderson – Putney
- Alex Ballinger – Halesowen
- Paula Barker – Liverpool Wavertree
- Apsana Begum – Poplar and Limehouse
- Sir Chris Bryant – Rhondda and Ogmore
- Richard Burgon – Leeds East
- Dawn Butler – Brent East
- Ian Byrne – Liverpool West Derby
- Liam Byrne – Birmingham Hodge Hill and Solihull North
- Sarah Champion – Rotherham
- Neil Coyle – Bermondsey and Old Southwark
- Janet Daby – Lewisham East
- Marsha de Cordova – Battersea
- Tan Dhesi – Slough
- Florence Eshalomi – Vauxhall and Camberwell Green
- Vicky Foxcroft – Lewisham North
- Mary Kelly Foy – City of Durham
- Barry Gardiner Brent West
- Preet Kaur Gill – Birmingham Edgbaston
- Mary Glindon – Newcastle upon Tyne East and Wallsend
- Rachel Hopkins – Luton South and South Bedfordshire
- Rupa Huq – Ealing Central and Acton
- Imran Hussain – Bradford East
- Dame Diana Johnson – Kingston upon Hull North and Cottingham
- Kim Johnson – Liverpool Riverside
- Ruth Jones – Newport West and Islwyn
- Afzal Khan – Manchester Rusholme
- Stephen Kinnock Aberafan Maesteg
- Ian Lavery – Blyth and Ashington
- Kim Leadbeater – Spen Valley
- Emma Lewell-Buck – South Shields
- Shabana Mahmood – Birmingham Ladywood
- Seema Malhotra – Feltham and Heston
- Rachael Maskell – York Central
- Kerry McCarthy – Bristol East
- Andy McDonald – Middlesbrough and Thornaby East
- John McDonnell – Hayes and Harlington
- Navendu Mishra – Stockport
- Stephen Morgan – Portsmouth South
- Grahame Morris – Easington
- Chi Onwurah – Newcastle upon Tyne Central and West
- Kate Osborne – Jarrow and Gateshead East
- Sarah Owen – Luton North
- Yasmin Qureshi – Bolton South and Walkden
- Bell Ribeiro-Addy – Clapham and Brixton Hill
- Naz Shah – Bradford West
- Michael Shanks – Rutherglen
- Andy Slaughter – Hammersmith and Chiswick
- Jeff Smith – Manchester Withington
- Wes Streeting – Ilford North
- Gareth Thomas – Harrow West
- Emily Thornberry – Islington South and Finsbury
- Sir Stephen Timms – East Ham
- Dan Tomlinson – Chipping Barnet
- Valerie Vaz – Walsall and Bloxwich
- Nadia Whittome – Nottingham East

== Members 2019–2024 ==
In the 2019–2024 parliament, the members were:

- Debbie Abrahams – Oldham East and Saddleworth
- Rushanara Ali – Bethnal Green and Bow
- Tahir Ali – Birmingham Hall Green
- Jonathan Ashworth – Leicester South
- Paula Barker – Liverpool Wavertree
- Apsana Begum – Poplar and Limehouse
- Paul Blomfield – Sheffield Central
- Ben Bradshaw – Exeter
- Chris Bryant – Rhondda
- Richard Burgon – Leeds East
- Dawn Butler – Brent Central
- Ian Byrne – Liverpool West Derby
- Liam Byrne – Birmingham Hodge Hill
- Sarah Champion – Rotherham
- Alex Cunningham – Stockton North
- Wayne David – Caerphilly
- Marsha de Cordova – Battersea
- Tan Dhesi – Slough
- Julie Elliott – Sunderland Central
- Florence Eshalomi – Vauxhall
- Vicky Foxcroft – Lewisham Deptford
- Mary Kelly Foy – City of Durham
- Preet Kaur Gill – Birmingham Edgbaston
- Mary Glindon – North Tyneside
- Andrew Gwynne – Denton and Reddish
- Kate Hollern – Blackburn
- Rachel Hopkins – Luton South
- Rupa Huq – Ealing Central and Acton
- Imran Hussain – Bradford East
- Kim Johnson – Liverpool Riverside
- Ruth Jones – Newport West
- Afzal Khan – Manchester Gorton
- Stephen Kinnock – Aberavon
- Ian Lavery – Wansbeck
- Kim Leadbeater – Batley and Spen
- Emma Lewell-Buck – South Shields
- Shabana Mahmood – Birmingham Ladywood
- Seema Malhotra – Feltham and Heston
- Rachael Maskell – York Central
- Kerry McCarthy – Bristol East
- John McDonnell – Hayes and Harlington
- Ian Mearns – Gateshead
- Navendu Mishra – Stockport
- Stephen Morgan – Portsmouth South
- Grahame Morris – Easington
- Kate Osborne – Jarrow
- Sarah Owen – Luton North
- Yasmin Qureshi – Bolton South East
- Bell Ribeiro-Addy – Streatham
- Lloyd Russell-Moyle – Brighton Kemptown
- Naz Shah – Bradford West
- Michael Shanks – Rutherglen and Hamilton West
- Andy Slaughter – Hammersmith
- Jeff Smith – Manchester Withington
- Wes Streeting – Ilford North
- Zarah Sultana – Coventry South
- Sam Tarry – Ilford South
- Gareth Thomas – Harrow West
- Stephen Timms – East Ham
- Valerie Vaz – Walsall South
- Alan Whitehead – Southampton Test
- Nadia Whittome – Nottingham East
- Andy McDonald – Middlesbrough

== Members until 2019 ==
Until 2019, the parliamentary members of the group were:

MP	Constituency
Diane Abbott	Hackney North
Debbie Abrahams	Oldham East and Saddleworth
Rushanara Ali	Bethnal Green
Jonathan Ashworth	Leicester South
Clive Betts	Sheffield, Attercliffe
Paul Blomfield	Sheffield Central
Lyn Brown	West Ham
Chris Bryant	Rhondda
Karen Buck	Westminster North
Richard Burgon	Leeds East
Dawn Butler	Brent Central
Liam Byrne	Birmingham Hodge Hill
Ruth Cadbury	Brentford and Isleworth
Sarah Champion	Rotherham
Jeremy Corbyn	Islington North
Neil Coyle	Bermondsey and Old Southwark
Alex Cunningham	Stockton North
Thangam Debbonaire	Bristol South
Stephen Doughty	Cardiff South and Penarth
Peter Dowd	Bootle
Jack Dromey	Birmingham Erdington
Angela Eagle	Wallasey
Clive Efford	Eltham
Julie Elliott	Sunderland Central
Bill Esterson	Sefton Central

MP	Constituency
Colleen Fletcher	Coventry North East
Vicky Foxcroft	Lewisham Deptford
Mary Glindon	North Tyneside
Lilian Greenwood	Nottingham South
Nia Griffith	Llanelli
Louise Haigh	Sheffield Heeley
Fabian Hamilton	Leeds North East
Carolyn Harris	Swansea East
Sharon Hodgson	Gateshead East and Washington West
Kate Hollern	Blackburn
George Howarth	Knowsley North and Sefton East
Rupa Huq	Ealing Central and Acton
Imran Hussain	Bradford East
Diana Johnson	Kingston upon Hull North
Gerald Jones	Merthyr Tydfil and Rhymney
Afzal Khan	Manchester Gorton
Stephen Kinnock	Aberavon
David Lammy	Tottenham
Ian Lavery	Wansbeck
Tony Lloyd	Rochdale
Rebecca Long-Bailey	Salford and Eccles
Holly Lynch	Halifax
Shabana Mahmood	Birmingham, Ladywood
Chris Matheson	City of Chester
Rachael Maskell	York Central
Kerry McCarthy	Bristol East

MP	Constituency
Andy McDonald	Middlesbrough
John McDonnell	Hayes and Harlington
Conor McGinn	St Helens North
Grahame Morris	Easington
Ian Murray	Edinburgh South
Lisa Nandy	Wigan
Kate Osamor	Edmonton
Matthew Pennycook	Greenwich
Teresa Pearce	Erith and Thamesmead
Toby Perkins	Chesterfield
Bridget Phillipson	Houghton & Sunderland South
Yasmin Qureshi	Bolton South East
Angela Rayner	Ashton-under-Lyme
Christina Rees	Neath
Marie Rimmer	St Helens South and Whiston
Geoffrey Robinson	Coventry North East
Naz Shah	Bradford West
Virendra Sharma	Ealing Southall
Barry Sheerman	Huddersfield
Tulip Siddiq	Hampstead and Kilburn
Andy Slaughter	Hammersmith
Cat Smith	Lancaster and Fleetwood
Nick Smith	Blaenau Gwent
Owen Smith	Pontypridd
Keir Starmer	Holborn and St Pancras
Jo Stevens	Cardiff Central

MP	Constituency
Wes Streeting	Ilford North
Graham Stringer	Blackley and Broughton
Mark Tami	Alyn and Deeside
Gareth Thomas	Harrow West
Nick Thomas-Symonds	Torfaen
Emily Thornberry	Islington South and Finsbury
Stephen Timms	East Ham
Jon Trickett	Hemsworth
Karl Turner	Kingston upon Hull East
Derek Twigg	Halton
Valerie Vaz	Walsall South
Alan Whitehead	Southampton, Test
Catherine West	Hornsey and Wood Green
Rosie Winterton	Doncaster Central
Daniel Zeichner	Cambridge

== See also ==
- Labour Friends of Israel
