= John Carlisle (British politician) =

British politician (1942–2019)

Member of Parliament for Luton North
- In office 9 June 1983 – 8 April 1997
- Preceded by: Constituency established
- Succeeded by: Kelvin Hopkins

Member of Parliament for Luton West
- In office 3 May 1979 – 13 May 1983
- Preceded by: Brian Sedgemore
- Succeeded by: Constituency abolished

Personal details
- Born: 28 August 1942 Henlow, Bedfordshire, England
- Died: 18 February 2019 (aged 76) Seal Chart, Kent, England
- Party: Conservative
- Spouse: Anthea May (m. 1964)
- Children: 2

John Russell Carlisle (28 August 1942 – 18 February 2019) was a Conservative Party Member of Parliament (MP) for the Luton West constituency and later the Luton North constituency in Bedfordshire. Carlisle was Public Affairs Director of the UK Tobacco Manufacturers' Association from 1997 until 2001, although he was a non-smoker.

== Early life ==
John Carlisle was born in Henlow, Bedfordshire, the son of Andrew Russell and Edith Carlisle (née Handley). He was educated at Bedford School, and St Lawrence College, Ramsgate. Carlisle married Anthea Jane Lindsay May in 1964; the couple had two daughters.

He was a senior executive (1964–78) of Sidney C. Banks Ltd., Sandy, Bedfordshire, a member of the London Corn Exchange (1970–79 and 1987–97), and was a Director of Granfin Agriculture Ltd., Stoke Ferry, Norfolk (1979–83). From 1982–87 he was a consultant to Louis Dreyfus plc., and to Barry Simmons PR (1987–97). He was a non-executive director of the Bletchley Motor Group, 1988–95, and of Charles Sidney plc, 1995–97. He was a member of the Baltic Exchange, 1991–97.

== Political career ==
John Carlisle was vice-chairman (1973–74) and chairman (1974–76) of the Mid Bedfordshire Constituency Conservative Association, and was elected MP for Luton West in the 1979 general election. For some time after his election he shared an office with future Prime Minister John Major. In 1983 Carlisle's constituency of Luton West was abolished and he was elected MP for the new constituency of Luton North. He was chairman of the Conservative Parliamentary Committee on Sport (1981–84), vice-chairman of the All-Party Football Committee, secretary of the Conservative Parliamentary Foreign Affairs Committee (Africa) 1982–83, and was a member of the International Executive Committee of "Freedom in Sport". He was also treasurer of the Anglo-Gibraltar Group, 1981–82, and was secretary (1983–87), and chairman (1987) of the British-South Africa Group. He was elected vice-president of the Federation of Conservative Students in 1986 and was governor of the Sports Aid Foundation (Eastern Region), 1985–96. He was a member of the Parliamentary Select Committee on Agriculture 1985–88.

He was an active member of the Conservative Monday Club and from c. 1980 to 1982 was chairman of their Foreign Affairs Committee. He was guest-of-honour at the club's Hampshire and Dorset branch Autumn Dinner on 20 October 1989. On 4 April 1991, the London Evening Standard carried a front-page attack by the Monday Club against the proposed appointment of Janet Street-Porter for the position of the BBC's Head of Arts and Culture. Ultimately, she did not get the job. During his tenure as a Member of Parliament, John Carlisle regularly hosted Monday Club meetings in Committee Rooms at the House of Commons. He supported the pro-gun lobby after the Dunblane massacre. The Almanac of British Politics recorded him as backing hanging and flogging, and opposing feminism, homosexual law reform and the European Economic Community.

=== South Africa and apartheid ===
Carlisle was opposed to the Gleneagles Agreement of 1977 which discouraged sporting ties to the apartheid regime in South Africa. In 1981 he called it a "worthless treaty" and urged the International Cricket Council (ICC) to readmit South Africa. Advocating the right of sportsmen to play wherever they wished, he offered his support for the 1982 English rebels tour saying that "many of us will salute the courage that has been shown by these players." After the Test and County Cricket Board banned players who had featured in the tour he described it as "a sorry day for international cricket." In 1983 he called on the Marylebone Cricket Club (MCC), as a club, to tour South Africa as a means of establishing if contemporary opinion polls approving of reviving sporting links were correct. The suggestion was rejected by MCC members.

In July 1982 he urged Margaret Thatcher to bring Enoch Powell into her cabinet. But she refused, reiterating what she had previously declared in February 1975 and April 1979, that there would never be a position for Powell in any government of hers.

In one of his interventions in a 1987 House of Commons debates, he claimed that "the system of apartheid in South Africa has worked in terms of government", although he claimed not to support it. Nevertheless, this defence of the South African government prompted journalist Edward Pearce to label him "the member for Bloemfontein West". Of the television screening of the April 1990 tribute concert in London for the newly freed Nelson Mandela, the MP said: "The BBC have just gone bananas over this and seem to be joining those who are making Mandela out to be a Christ-like figure." Carlisle observed: "This hero worship is misplaced." He had earlier described Mandela as a terrorist in 1988.

== Later life ==
Carlisle announced that he would retire from politics in September 1996, and would not stand at the following General Election in 1997. He died at his home in Seal Chart, Kent, on 18 February 2019.

== Bibliography ==
- Dod's Parliamentary Companion 1992, 173rd edition, East Sussex.
- Black, A & C.,Who's Who, London. (Various editions).
- Rhodesia to Zimbabwe - An Assessment, Policy Paper by the Monday Club's Foreign Affairs Committee, Chairman: John Carlisle, MP July 1982.
- Thompson, Cllr. Peter, (Foreword by John Carlisle, MP.), The United Nations Organisation, Discussion Paper by the Monday Club's Foreign Affairs Committee, October 1988.
- The Almanac of British Politics, London, 1996 (5th edition).

Parliament of the United Kingdom
Preceded by Brian Sedgemore	Member of Parliament for Luton West; 1979–1983	Constituency abolished
New constituency	Member of Parliament for Luton North; 1983–1997	Succeeded by Kelvin Hopkins
