= Bill McKenzie, Baron McKenzie of Luton =

British politician (1946–2021)

The Right Honourable The Lord McKenzie of Luton
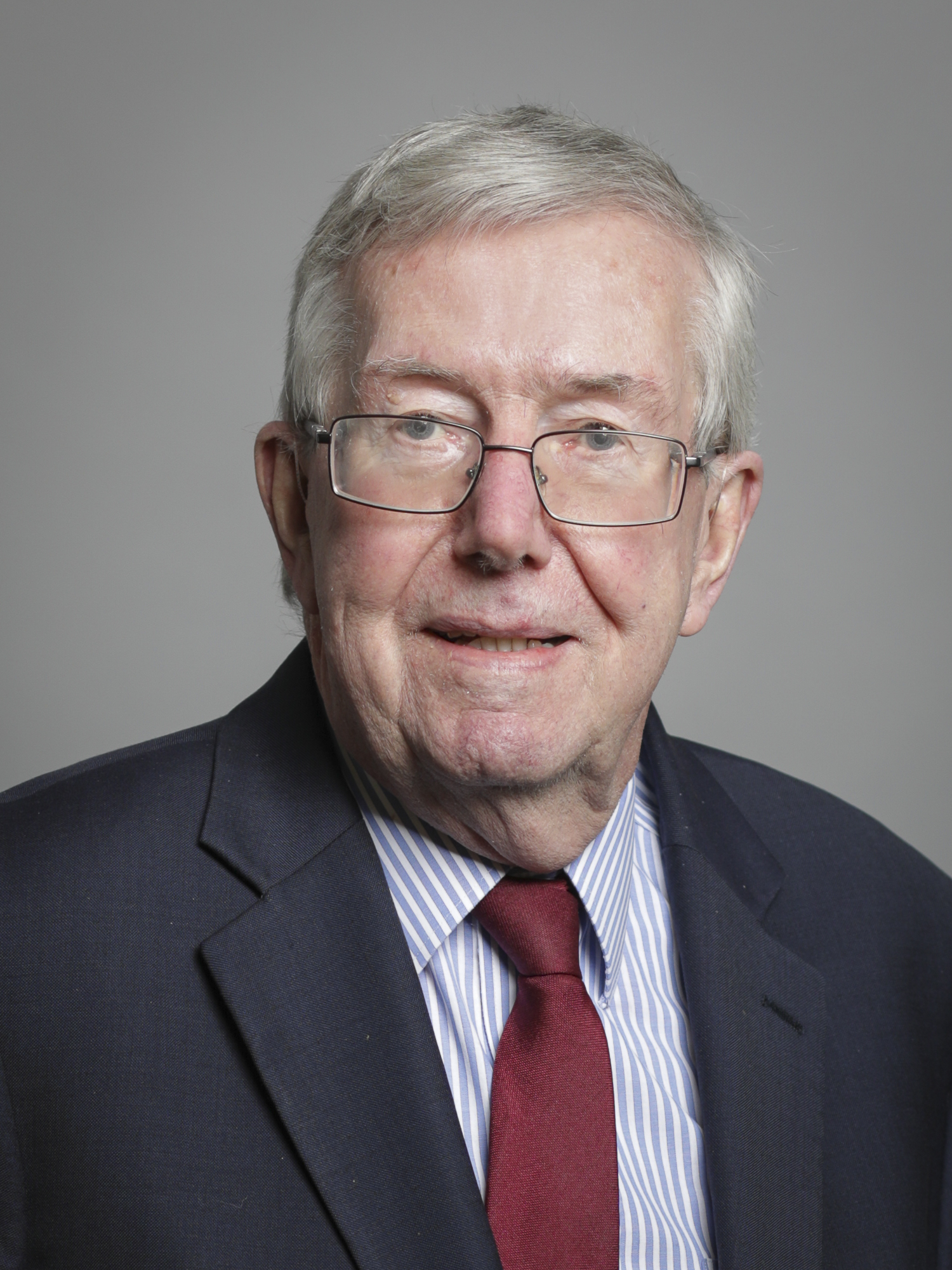
- McKenzie in 2020

Parliamentary Under-Secretary for Communities and Local Government
- In office 5 June 2009 – 6 May 2010
- Prime Minister: Gordon Brown
- Preceded by: The Baroness Andrews
- Succeeded by: The Baroness Hanham

Parliamentary Under-Secretary of State for Work and Pensions
- In office 8 January 2007 – 6 May 2010
- Prime Minister: Tony Blair; Gordon Brown
- Preceded by: The Lord Hunt of Kings Heath
- Succeeded by: The Lord Freud (welfare reform)

Lord-in-waiting
- In office 10 May 2005 – 8 January 2007
- Prime Minister: Tony Blair

Member of the House of Lords
- Lord Temporal
- Life peerage 18 June 2004 – 2 December 2021

Personal details
- Born: 24 July 1946
- Died: 2 December 2021 (aged 75)
- Party: Labour
- Spouse: Diana Angliss (m. 1972)
- Education: University of Bristol

William David McKenzie, Baron McKenzie of Luton (24 July 1946 – 2 December 2021) was a British Labour politician. Until the 2010 general election, he was Parliamentary Under-Secretary of State at the Department for Work and Pensions and the Department for Communities and Local Government. He was also a partner at accounting firm Price Waterhouse.

== Education and early career ==
Born in Reading in 1946, son of Donald McKenzie and wife Elsa "Elsie" May Doust, McKenzie was educated at the University of Bristol between 1964 and 1967, graduating with a BA degree in Economics and Accounting. In 1967, he began his accountancy career at Martin Rata and Partners as an articled clerk and went on to qualify as a professional accountant. He moved to Price Waterhouse in 1973, working for a senior manager in many locations. In 1980, he was promoted to a partner, holding this position until 1986, when he became a consultant. He stayed within the company, but in 1992, he moved to Hong Kong, working first as a consultant, and then as a partner again. He acted as partner-in-charge for Price Waterhouse Vietnam from 1996 to 1998.

== Early political career ==
McKenzie twice contested the seat of Luton South in the 1987 and 1992 general elections respectively. However, both attempts were unsuccessful.

He was an elected member of Luton Borough Council from 1976 to 1992, then again from 1999 to 2005, following a spell in the far east. He served as its leader until May 2003 and remained on the council until 2005. He covered a number of roles during his Council service, particularly relating to local government finance. During this time, he was a member of the GMB trade union, serving a range of trades from clerical work to furniture manufacturers. Lord McKenzie remained a member of GMB. He was also Chairman of London Luton Airport.

== Later political career ==
McKenzie was elevated to the peerage on 18 June 2004 as Baron McKenzie of Luton, of Luton, in the County of Bedfordshire. He was appointed Government Spokesperson in the House of Lords Treasury and a Whip for the Department of Trade and Industry in May 2005. Before being awarded a peerage, Lord McKenzie had been an advisor to Labour's Shadow Treasury team and a member of the original Fabian Society Taxation Review Committee. McKenzie served as a Lord in Waiting and Government Spokesperson in the House of Lords for Treasury and Industry issues from 2005 to 2007. He was appointed Parliamentary Under-Secretary of State at the Department for Work and Pensions on 8 January 2007 and among his ministerial responsibilities were health and safety at work and the Health and Safety Executive. In the June 2009 reshuffle he retained this role, in addition to becoming a minister at the Department for Communities and Local Government.

After the 2010 General Election, Lord McKenzie shadowed his former roles in the House of Lords, as opposition spokesman on both Work and Pensions, and Communities and Local Government. He remained in this position after the election of Ed Miliband as Labour Party leader.

== Personal life ==
McKenzie married Diana Joyce Angliss in 1972. She became Lady McKenzie of Luton when her husband was elevated to the peerage in 2004.

He died on 2 December 2021, at the age of 75.
