= People's Pledge =

The People's Pledge
- Formation: 13 March 2011
- Dissolved: c. 2016
- Type: Political movement
- Purpose: The holding of an in/out referendum on Britain's continued membership of the European Union
- Location: Westminster
- Region served: United Kingdom
- Staff: Former directors: Stuart Coster, Ian McKenzie, Mark Seddon Co-founders: Christopher Bruni-Lowe, Marc Glendening, Stuart Coster
- Website: www.peoplespledge.org

The People's Pledge was a political campaign to secure a referendum on the United Kingdom's membership of the European Union. It aimed to achieve this by asking voters to sign a pledge that they would use their vote to help secure a majority of Members of Parliament (MPs) in support of an in-out referendum on EU membership. The 1975 European Communities membership referendum was the last time such a vote had occurred in Britain.

The campaign did not take a view on whether the UK should stay in, or leave, the EU; simply that the expansion of the EU's powers and influence over government since the 1975 'common market' referendum merited people being consulted again on continued membership. According to the Labour Party MP Kelvin Hopkins: "While those who initiated the People's Pledge campaign are primarily Eurosceptic, it has support from those who take a different, pro-EU view, but who wish to see the issue properly resolved by a vote of the British people."

Directed at its launch by Mark Seddon, with cross-party support from MPs including the Labour party's head of policy Jon Cruddas MP and other politicians including then Mayor of London Boris Johnson, it aimed in particular to focus pressure on MPs in marginal seats using the tactic of holding independently scrutinised constituency referendums. By early 2012, more than 128,000 voters and 87 MPs had signed up to the campaign. In September 2012, the People's Pledge was appointed as the secretariat to a new APPG for an EU referendum, with Conservative MP John Baron acting as the group's chair and Labour MP and former government minister Keith Vaz as vice chair.

The campaign is credited with having had a key role in bringing about the United Kingdom European Union membership referendum, held in June 2016. Prominent Conservative MEP Daniel Hannan wrote in his 2016 book What Next? that "The People's Pledge was the most effective popular campaign I have ever been involved with, and must be reckoned one of the most successful pressure groups in British history." James Forsyth, writing in The Spectator, said that the campaign's recruitment of Boris Johnson as a supporter had made an EU referendum almost certain: "Boris Johnson's decision while campaigning last month to sign up to the campaign for an in/out referendum on EU membership could be a key moment in the history of the Conservative party – the moment when the party's balance of power tipped decisively in favour of a referendum." Along with Forsyth, Paul Goodman of ConservativeHome and Leo McKinstry of the Daily Express have cited the success of the campaign as a main reason why a referendum became a possibility.

== Background ==
In January 1973, on its third application, Britain was accepted into the European Economic Community. The 1975 European Communities membership referendum was held after that, following a change in government from the Conservatives under Edward Heath who had led the application process, to the minority Labour government of Harold Wilson, who had made a referendum an election promise. The referendum found 67% to be in favour, on a 65% turnout. Subsequent treaties leading to the development of the European Union were signed into law without recourse to a referendum.

According to the campaign, all three major British political parties withdrew promises of a referendum on the last major European treaty, which proposed the creation of a European Constitution, after it was re-drafted as the Treaty of Lisbon, and subsequently ratified by the UK on 19 June 2008 by the Labour Government of Gordon Brown. The subsequent 2010 general election unusually produced a hung parliament, leading to a Conservative – Liberal Democrat coalition government bound by an agreement that there would be "no further transfer of sovereignty or powers over the course of the next Parliament", and to cover for future terms, proposed the introduction of the European Union Bill 2010, which sought to "amend the 1972 European Communities Act so that any proposed future treaty that transferred areas of power, or competences, would be subject to a referendum on that treaty". The coalition did not however commit to holding a referendum on the status of the existing membership.

A YouGov poll conducted in September 2010 of 1,948 adults in the UK found that if there was a referendum on Britain's membership of the EU, 47% would vote to leave, compared to 33% who would want to remain.

== Launch ==
The People's Pledge campaign was launched in Westminster on 15 March 2011. The campaign website had been launched two days earlier.

The campaign described its views citing five key reasons why a referendum was needed: that nobody under the age of 54 had ever been given the chance to vote on the issue (i.e., those aged 18 or over in 1975), that the EU now made the majority of laws of the United Kingdom, that the ministers and parliamentarians making those laws were not accountable to British voters, that the cost of the EU to the British taxpayer was rising, and that the European Commission was aiming for further powers of economic governance.

The campaign claimed that over 6,000 people had already signed the pledge before the official launch, and 30,000 people had signed by 17 March. Daniel Hannan in The Daily Telegraph claimed: "in the first 5 days more than 42,000 people had signed up via the campaign's website and 3,000 more volunteered to help leaflet".

The People's Pledge were at launch the only campaign listed in the BBC's "Timeline: Campaigns for a European Union referendum".

The launch was accompanied by front-page coverage in support of the campaign by the British tabloid newspaper the Daily Express, headlined 'New Hope to Get Out of EU'. The Daily Express had themselves shortly beforehand delivered a petition to 10 Downing Street calling for an EU referendum, under the Express 'Crusade' banner 'Get Britain Out of the EU'. Commenting in the article, Mark Seddon stated that what differentiated the People's Pledge campaign was that the initiative had come from the left. In response, the then leader of the Labour party Ed Miliband told the paper: "It seems to me that we made a decision on Europe in 1975. I think it was the right decision." Seddon further set out the campaign's objectives in an article for The Daily Telegraph titled "A referendum on Europe is long overdue".

Writing for the political magazine The Spectator, Peter Hoskin stated that, while there had been many previous campaigns for such a referendum, the timing of the People's Pledge campaign was slightly more resonant. Hoskin cited the recent positions of the two parties that went on to form the governing coalition in 2010 and polling suggesting 54% of people would prefer to have a referendum on the issue of the EU, instead of the 2011 referendum on the Alternative Vote brought about as part of the coalition agreement and scheduled for 5 May 2011. This would be the first national referendum since the 1975 EU membership referendum. On the campaign's potential, he stated, "at the very least, it might persuade some candidates to face up to, and meet, the tide of public opinion on Europe", claiming that public support for leaving the EU had been steadily rising and even a large number of non-Eurosceptics have wanted such a referendum for some time.

Caroline Crampton writing for Total Politics magazine said "the campaign has pulled off a major coup by persuading touchy-feely Tory Zac Goldsmith to lend his support. Goldsmith, a star of the new intake, gives the campaign a way of rebutting the idea that this is a thinly veiled attempt to put pressure on the government to pull out of the EU. He lends credibility to their claim that this is just about democratic consultation".

Also writing in The Spectator, Charles Moore said "the real power of this campaign will be seen in the selection of candidates. If constituencies can muster a few thousand Pledgers, anyone wishing to be an MP next time round will be wise to favour a referendum whether he or she wants in or out".

On 9 May 2011 the campaign was featured on BBC Radio 4's Start the Week program hosted by Andrew Marr. In a discussion with Denis MacShane, Ruth Lea noted that the People's Pledge had a real chance of succeeding where others had failed before due to the political atmospherics at that time and that it was "genuinely cross party and led from the left".

== Organisation ==
Mark Seddon, a former editor of Tribune magazine and previously a member of the Labour National Executive Committee, was the campaign's director at launch, working alongside its co-founders Christopher Bruni-Lowe, Stuart Coster and Marc Glendening. The campaign's activities were overseen by a number of MPs and other figures named as part of an 'Advisory Council'. On 20 December 2011, the campaign announced that Ian McKenzie, a former New Labour adviser and aide to the former Deputy Prime Minister John Prescott and former leader of the House of Commons Anne Taylor had been appointed its director of communications. Patrick Wintour political editor of the Guardian and Tim Montgomerie of ConservativeHome remarked that the appointment of McKenzie was a "clever choice".

=== Advisory Council ===
- John Mills (Chair), secretary, Labour Euro Safeguards Campaign and chairman, JML
- Natascha Engel, Labour MP (2005–)
- Austin Mitchell, Labour MP (1977–)
- Roger Godsiff, Labour MP (1992–)
- Ronnie Campbell, Labour MP (1987–)
- Kelvin Hopkins, Labour MP (1997–)
- John Cryer, Labour MP (1997–)
- Kate Hoey, Labour MP (1989–)
- Graham Stringer, Labour MP (1997–)
- David Drew, Labour MP (1997–2010)
- Zac Goldsmith, Conservative MP (2010–)
- Douglas Carswell, Conservative MP (2005–)
- Nigel Dodds, Democratic Unionist Party, Deputy Leader, MP (2001–)
- Daniel Hannan, Conservative MEP (1999–)
- Marta Andreasen, UKIP MEP (2009)
- Jenny Jones, Green AM (2000–)
- Jim Sillars, deputy leader Scottish National Party (1990–92), MP (1970–92)
- Bryan Gould, former Labour MP (1983–1994)
- Ruth Lea, economist
- John King, author and publisher
- Virginia Ironside, author and journalist
- Brian Denny, Trade Unionists Against the EU Constitution
- Dele Ogun, lawyer
- Michael Watts, former finance director of the Labour Party
- Robert Hiscox of Hiscox
- Charles Moore, Journalist; former editor of the Daily Telegraph & Spectator
- Cllr Steve Radford, President, Liberal Party (2005–)

Other supporters also listed include:

- Fay Weldon, author and playwright
- John Stevens, former Conservative MEP
- Bob Crow, General Secretary of the RMT
- Iain Dale, blogger and political commentator
- Caroline Lucas Green MP (2010–)
- Bill Greenshields, Chairperson of the Communist Party of Britain and former President of the National Union of Teachers (2008–09)
- The comedian Lee Hurst backed the campaign in a piece in the Evening Standard and is listed as an official supporter on the campaign's website.

== Support ==
=== In Parliament ===
Although the campaign has the support of various MPs on its Advisory Council, a number of other MPs have publicly backed the campaign. The campaign have the support of 87 MPs to date who have all signed the Pledge. A number of MPs have expressed their support in public, including Labour party head of policy Jon Cruddas, Shadow Environment Minister Tom Harris, Keith Vaz Richard Drax,John Stevenson, Andrew Turner, Edward Leigh, Mike Weatherley, George Howarth, Jason McCartney,Gordon Henderson, Martin Vickers, Matthew Offord and Steve Baker. Conservative MP Mark Reckless while on the BBC Daily Politics discussing his EU bailout motion stated that he backs the campaign and urged others to do so. Reckless also congratulated the campaign during Parliamentary Business Questions for "pressing for a referendum on Europe and the debate on Monday", This comment related to the in/out referendum debate and vote that was being held a few days later.

In that same parliamentary sitting the Conservative MP David Nuttall asked whether the "Government will recompense anyone who planned to attend a lobby of Parliament next Thursday, organised by the People's Pledge, but have now had to reorganise their travel plans as a result of the rescheduling of Government business?" This comment related to the campaigns holding of a lobby on the original day of the in/out referendum vote. This was subsequently brought forward by a few days.

The Conservative MP Guto Bebb had signed up to the campaign but subsequently backed out of voting for the referendum motion on 24 October.

==== MPs signed up to the campaign ====
The campaign has 86 MPs listed as supports on their website. They are:

David Amess, Steve Baker, John Baron, Guto Bebb, Andrew Bingham, Brian Binley, Bob Blackman, Peter Bone, Andrew Bridgen, Steve Brine, Conor Burns, Gregory Campbell, Douglas Carswell, William Cash, Christopher Chope, James Clappison, Rosie Cooper, David Crausby, Tracey Crouch, Jon Cruddas, John Cryer, David TC Davies, Philip Davies, Nick de Bois, Caroline Dinenage, Nigel Dodds, Jeffrey Donaldson, Nadine Dorries, Richard Drax, Natascha Engel, Mark Field, Jim Fitzpatrick, Mike Freer, Roger Godsiff, Zac Goldsmith, James Gray, Mike Hancock, Tom Harris, Gordon Henderson, Kate Hoey, Lindsay Hoyle, Philip Hollobone, Adam Holloway, Kelvin Hopkins, George Howarth, Stewart Jackson, Edward Leigh, Julian Lewis, Caroline Lucas, Anne Main, Jason McCartney, Karl McCartney, William McCrea, Iain McKenzie, Patrick Mercer, Nigel Mills, Austin Mitchell, Anne-Marie Morris, Caroline Nokes, David Nuttall, Matthew Offord, Ian Paisley, Neil Parish, Priti Patel, Andrew Percy, Mark Reckless, John Redwood, Simon Reevell, Laurence Robertson, Andrew Rosindell, Jim Shannon, Richard Shepherd, David Simpson, Henry Smith, John Stevenson, Bob Stewart, Graham Stringer, Gerry Sutcliffe, Justin Tomlinson, Andrew Turner, Derek Twigg, Keith Vaz, Martin Vickers, Mike Weatherly, Heather Wheeler, Sammy Wilson.

==== All Party Parliamentary Group ====
The Campaign in September 2012 were announced as the secretariat to the APPG for an EU referendum, with Conservative MP John Baron acting as the groups chair and Keith Vaz as vice chair. The groups aim is to push for an EU referendum at the earliest opportunity.

=== Other notable support ===
==== Boris Johnson, London Mayor ====
The campaign announced on 25 March that the Conservative Mayor of London Boris Johnson had signed up to their campaign after being approached by an activist while on a visit to the Romford constituency of Conservative MP Andrew Rosindell. Rosindell said in a statement, "I am delighted Boris has signed up for the People's Pledge. A clear majority of the British People and the vast majority of Conservative supporters want a referendum on our membership of the European Union. I wish the campaign all the best in its efforts."

The blog Conservative Home remarked: "This latest move makes him the most senior person in the party to support an in/out referendum – the Mayor of Britain's biggest city, no less. It is major news – and won't be looked upon kindly by Downing Street." This ledDaniel Hannan to say: "A referendum on EU membership is starting to feel unavoidable. Boris Johnson's support for the People's Pledge is just the latest token of a changed atmosphere." The campaign also has the support of the Green London Mayoral candidate Jenny Jones.

James Forsyth writing in The Spectator asserts that Boris Johnson signing the Pledge has made an EU referendum almost certain: "The Romford Pledge might not have the same ring to it as the Tamworth Manifesto. But Boris Johnson's decision while campaigning last month to sign up to the campaign for an in/out referendum on EU membership could be a key moment in the history of the Conservative party – the moment when the party's balance of power tipped decisively in favour of a referendum."

==== Bob Crow, RMT Union ====
It was reported by the Alliance for Workers' Liberty, "The Rail, Maritime and Transport workers' union RMT has become the first union to formally back the campaign. RMT leader Bob Crow was already an individual supporter." It was announced in the Morning Star that the Communist Party Executive backed the People's Pledge.

== Campaign strategy ==
The People's Pledge was a cross-party political campaign to bring about a binding yes or no referendum in the United Kingdom on the issue of Britain's continued membership of the European Union. It aimed to achieve this by making sure that only prospective candidates or sitting MPs standing for election to the House of Commons in the 2015 general election who promise to support the holding of such a referendum, are elected. Specifically, it asked voters to sign up to a pledge via the campaign's website to only support such candidates. In addition to showing the total number of signatories, the campaign would also present those figures broken down by constituency.

The campaign claimed this breakdown would be particularly effective in swaying the outcome in the 100 most marginal seats. In addition, the campaign sought to make available to all who signed the pledge, the voting record of their local MP on European issues. Co-founder Christopher Bruni-Lowe outlined the strategy of the campaign in the November edition of Total Politics magazine in an article titled "Putting voters back in charge".

The pledge that voters are urged to sign is worded as follows:

I am voting for a referendum on EU membership. I will use my vote to help secure a majority of MPs in Parliament who support an EU referendum.

== Early activities ==
=== AV referendum ===
The People's Pledge announced its first ground campaign in Sheffield Hallam on 4 and 5 May 2011, which was publicized by the Evening Standard. The campaign was launched to coincide with the referendum on the Alternative Vote and targeted Deputy Prime Minister Nick Clegg over perceived changes of position over the holding of a referendum on Britain's membership of the European Union. The Sheffield Star reported that an actor dressed as "Cleggy Pollard" (after Vicky Pollard, a TV show character with the catchphrase "Yeah But, No But") toured Clegg's Sheffield constituency as voters went to the polls. Seddon announced "the object of the campaign is to highlight the Lib-Dem leader's betrayal of promises, such as student fees and the EU referendum, since he joined the Coalition.... We're drawing attention to a politician who cannot make up his mind on anything." Daniel Hannan, writing in The Daily Telegraph blog, said "at last someone draws attention to Nick Clegg's referendum hypocrisy".

Both the Evening Standard and Sunday Express reported that Seddon had been denied entry into the House of Commons while carrying leaflets with images of Nick Clegg mocked up as Vicky Pollard. On his way to see John Cryer MP, Seddon had the leaflets confiscated before being allowed entry.

=== Marginal constituency campaigns ===
Following on from its activity in Sheffield the campaign announced via its website that they would be launching its follow up marginal constituency campaign in the months of June and July in the South East of England. The constituencies mentioned were Hendon, Brent Central, Hampstead and Kilburn, Ealing Central and Acton, Ealing North, Sutton and Cheam, Streatham, Watford, Hammersmith, Islington South and Finsbury, Kingston and Surbiton, Brentford and Isleworth, Enfield North.

=== No more EU bail-out protest ===
On the same day as EU leaders agreed to a new £96 billion bail-out for Greece, the campaign held a protest outside Her Majesty's Treasury in Westminster, declaring that no further bail-outs of Eurozone countries should take place without holding an EU Referendum. The Labour MP Kate Hoey who joined the protest said: "Our country needs an EU referendum. People are fed up that we have lost control of our destiny to Brussels."

=== Congress for an EU referendum ===
The People's Pledge announced that on 22 October they are holding a one-day event in London at Westminster Central Hall. The participants will include MPs, journalists and businessmen. The Independent newspaper claimed that the Congress would be "the largest ever held for a referendum on Europe".'

In an article entitled "Euroscepticism isn't just for Tories any more", the journalist Daniel Knowles writing in The Spectator asserts that the Congress could be the event in which the growing private eurosceptic views among MPs is manifested. "A particular flash point could come in October, when the People's Pledge, a campaign group that wants to force an in-or-out referendum on the EU, hosts a rally. Several Labour and Conservative MPs are expected to attend, including some close to the government. David Cameron will be looking on with concern. He knows that nothing makes his party more mutinous than Europe." Dan Hannan writing in The Daily Telegraph urged all supporters of a referendum to attend saying "this is the single most important issue facing us as a people". He also claimed that despite the best efforts of the campaign, they had so far been unable to get anyone to come and debate not having a referendum. "All three parties oppose an in/out referendum, but no one will publicly admit the reason".

Dan Hannan reported in The Daily Telegraph that 2,000 people attended the congress.

The campaign were featured on the front page of The Sunday Telegraph on 23 October in a story titled "New euro 'empire' plot by Brussels", mention was made of the congress held on the Saturday. "Tory rebels were among speakers at a 'People's Pledge' pro-referendum rally in Westminster. They included David Davis, the former shadow home secretary, who called the EU a 'nascent superstate'."

In the program for the day the following were listed to participate; Mark Seddon, Kate Hoey, David Davis, Douglas Carswell, Steve Baker, Ruth Lea, Mark Littlewood, Daniel Hannan, Kelvin Hopkins, Lembit Öpik, Jenny Jones, Zac Goldsmith, Richard Drax, Brian Denny, Bob Crow, Patricia McKenna, Dounne Alexander, Keith Vaz, Peter Bone, John Cryer, Graham Stringer, Nich Brown, Priti Patel, Mark Reckless, Dominic Raab, Mike Weatherley, Tim Montgomerie, Marta Andreasen, John Stevens, Richard Lamming, and Steve Radford.

=== EU referendum vote in Parliament ===
The Conservative MP David Nuttall secured the debate via the Backbench Business Committee and the vote was announced to be on 27 October. To coincide with the vote, the People's Pledge secured the mass lobby of parliament where thousands were expected to attend to lobby their MP. Hours after this was announced the government changed the voting day to three days earlier. This was described by Tory MP Peter Bone as "unprecedented manipulation of backbench business". The newspapers reported that the change of date was "designed to undermine a mass lobby organised by the People's Pledge campaign for an EU referendum. The organisation was hoping thousands of supporters would be at Westminster next Thursday". In light of the change of date the Conservative MP David Nuttall asked whether the "Government will recompense anyone who planned to attend a lobby of Parliament next Thursday, organised by the People's Pledge, but have now had to reorganise their travel plans as a result of the rescheduling of Government business?"

In a letter circulated to all MPs on the day of the vote, the Conservative MP Steve Baker claimed the public appetite for the vote could be seen with the strength of support in each constituency for the People's Pledge campaign and the number of supporters that attended the Congress for an EU Referendum on Saturday 22 October.

== Local referendums ==
The campaign announced at a press conference in London that they would be holding local referendums around the country. The first would be in April, a further ten in 2012 and 100 more in 2013. They were to be overseen by the independent Electoral Reform Services Ltd. The Morning Star, which ran the referendum announcement on the front page, stated "every constituency chosen for a referendum would see door-to-door canvassing, posters, leaflets and media debate. It would be a full by-election-style campaign." The prominent website ConservativeHome stated, "under present boundaries, each seat represents about 70,000 constituents, and therefore to get 10,000 voters (or more) in each seat would be a very ambitious task. To add to the enormity of the project, it should be remembered that there is no precedent for a grassroots campaign holding seat-by-seat referendums."

At the press conference attended by Keith Vaz, Douglas Carswell and Natascha Engel, communications director Ian McKenzie announced the 1-10-100 campaign plan. This would see more than 100 local referendums take place over the next year, making it the most ambitious grassroots campaign ever undertaken in Britain. Writing in The Guardian Natascha Engel the day before the referendum announcement she said "the People's Pledge hopes to trigger the biggest grassroots campaign for an EU referendum we've ever seen in this country. Real voters will be voting for a say on our relationship with Europe." Douglas Carswell at the press conference urged all MPs to welcome the local referendums. "This campaign is not a threat to MPs, it's an opportunity. I hope MPs will regard this as an opportunity to restore trust in the political process." Keith Vaz said he has "no hesitation" in asking the British people to settle the issue. "We need to take this argument outside Parliament and let the British people participate in a proper discussion about our role in the EU. I am very confident if we have a referendum that the British people will vote to stay in."

There were 13 constituency seats under consideration to have the first referendum including that of MPs Chris Huhne Louise Mensch, Geoffrey Cox and Julie Hilling

The constituency of Thurrock was chosen as the first seat to have a referendum. It is held by the Conservative MP Jackie Doyle-Price who has a 92 majority.

=== Thurrock ===
Thurrock was the first constituency to have the EU referendum and the polls closed on Thursday 5 April 2012. The question on the ballot paper read

"Voters should be given a national referendum on whether the UK remains a member of the European Union. Agree or disagree?"

The result of the referendum was announced on BBC Radio 4 in a special edition of the PM programme. In total 47,995 ballots were sent out, with 14,590 votes recorded. 13,111 (89.9%) backed a referendum and 1,479 voted against having a referendum.< The turnout was 30.39% considered high even by local government election standards and greater than the last local election results in Thurrock.

Labour MP Kate Hoey who visited Thurrock during the campaign was quoted in the Express after the result saying "Thurrock has shown that voters who want a referendum in marginal seats will have real power to decide the outcome of the election. This amazing result should be a wake-up call for all MPs who have said Europe is not an important issue. I visited Thurrock during the campaign and was impressed with the enthusiasm for the Pledge campaign. There is huge disenchantment with all the mainstream political parties with their failure to keep their promises on a referendum on the EU. Today a clear message has gone to MPs who oppose giving the British people a say – listen to us or lose our vote."

More than 9,000 voters in Thurrock also signed the Pledge, where they commit to only vote for candidates that support an EU referendum.

Ian McKenzie, the campaign's communications director, said the 30.3% turnout was "truly astonishing", higher than many council election turnouts. He added: "This turnout is unignorable. The sitting MP and her Labour opponent cannot stick their fingers in their ears, or they are half the politicians I think they are. We were just 2,000 short of the votes the main candidates got in the election." The local elections held in Thurrock on 3 May 2012 had an average turnout of 26%, the Thurrock Gazette reported in an article titled 'Councillors ponder poor vote turnout', that the turnout for the People's Pledge referendum was higher than the turnout for last week's Thurrock Council election.

== Polling ==
Another YouGov poll commissioned by the campaign ahead of its launch found that, of 2,436 voters, 61% supported the idea of holding a referendum, with 25% opposing.

An opinion poll carried out by YouGov for the campaign showed that 54% would rather have a vote on whether Britain should remain members of the European Union than the 25% who wanted a vote on the Alternative Voting system.

To coincide with the proposed bailout of Portugal the campaign commissioned two further polls. It found that 65% were against Britain's participation in bailing out Portugal, while only 19% were in favour. It also found that 55% say that if we do contribute to the bail out of Portugal then we should have a referendum on our continued membership of the EU. Only 25% were against having a referendum under these circumstances. The poll results were widely reported in various newspapers and were used by Seddon in his comment piece in the Daily Express on 8 April. and by the economist Ruth Lea in a thunderer piece in The Times on the same day.

In a piece for the Evening Standard entitled Miliband 'can split the Coalition if he backs a poll on EU membership, a poll commissioned by the campaign found that 53 per cent of Labour supporters would back holding an "in-out" referendum. Some 76 per cent of Tory voters and 51 per cent of Lib-Dem supporters would also support a vote. Advisory Council member and former government whip Graham Stringer said: "If Ed wants a game changer, and we are not doing as well as we should be doing in the opinion polls, but if he wants to put the Conservatives into disarray, if he wants to change the public perception of him as a leader, then we the Labour Party need to say we want to listen to what the people are saying – we want your views on Europe".

== See also ==
- List of MPs elected in the 2010 United Kingdom general election
- Brexit
