= Qurban Hussain, Baron Hussain =

British–Pakistani Liberal Democrat politician and life peer (born 1956)

The Right Honourable The Lord Hussain
- قربان حسین
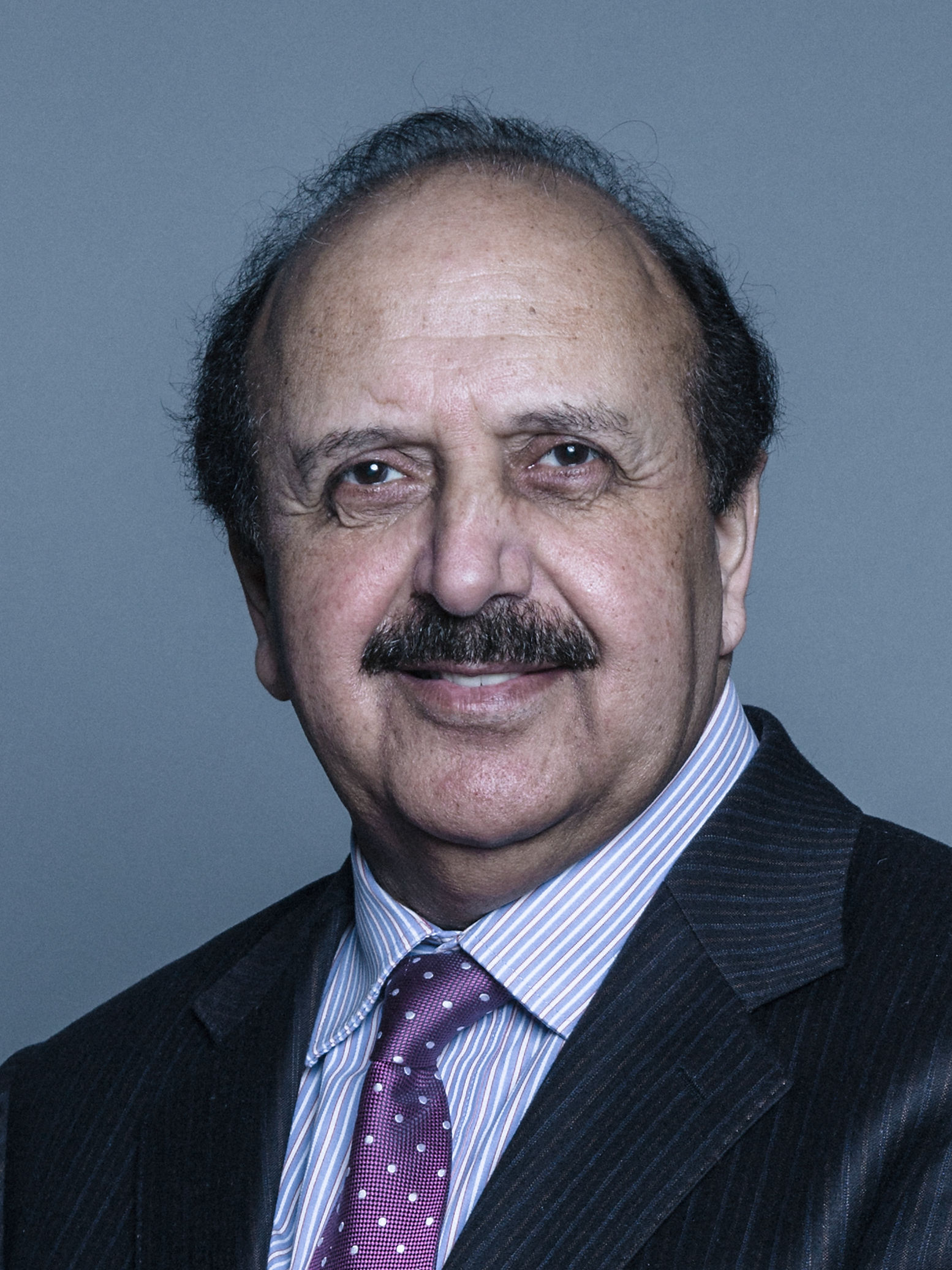
- Hussain in 2018

Member of the House of Lords
- Lord Temporal
- Life peerage 20 January 2011

Personal details
- Born: Qurban Hussain; 27 March 1956 (age 70) Kotli District, Azad Kashmir, Pakistan
- Party: Liberal Democrat (since 2003)
- Other political affiliations: Labour (1996–2003)
- Occupation: Politician

Qurban Hussain, Baron Hussain (Potwari: قربان حسین; born 27 March 1956) is a British–Pakistani Liberal Democrat politician and life peer.

== Early life ==
Hussain was born on 27 March 1956 to a Pahari Muslim family in Kotli, Mirpur District, Pakistan.

== Career ==
Hussain was the unsuccessful candidate for parliament for Luton South in 2005 and 2010. He was firstly a member of the Labour Party, from 1996 to 2003, but then joined the Liberal Democrats in protest over the Labour government-backed invasion of Iraq. He was a member of Luton Borough Council from 2003 until 2011, serving as its deputy leader from 2005 to 2007.

Hussain was created a life peer as Baron Hussain, of Luton in the county of Bedfordshire on 20 January 2011. In the Cameron–Clegg coalition government, he served as diversity adviser to Deputy Prime Minister Nick Clegg. Hussain briefly withdrew from the Lib Dem whip in March 2015 for having smuggled an impoverished two-year-old Kashmiri boy into the UK decades earlier, at the request of the boy's mother. He admitted to having committed an offence but insisted it was morally the right thing to do. He was later readmitted to the party whip.

=== Azerbaijan ===
Hussaun was paid by the authoritarian regime in Azerbaijan to serve as an election monitor in the 2024 parliamentary elections. He described the elections, which reputable election monitors characterized as neither free nor fair, as held "in the same way" as those in the United Kingdom.

In 2021, Hussain urged the British government to ask Armenia to inform Azerbaijan about the location of landmines in conflict areas between the two countries. Hussain made an almost identical request at the same time as two other British politicians who have ties to the Azerbaijan regime.

In 2022, Hussain attended an event run by the Azerbaijan embassy in the UK at Lancaster House to celebrate the country's independence. He was pictured alongside a British politician who has received payments from the Azerbaijan regime.

Orders of precedence in the United Kingdom
Preceded by The Lord Collins of Highbury	Gentlemen; Baron Hussain	Followed by The Lord Kestenbaum
