= Seal Chart =

Village in Kent, England

Coordinates: 51.284510°N 0.256260°E

- Location within Kent
- District: Sevenoaks
- Shire county: Kent
- Region: South East
- Country: England
- Sovereign state: United Kingdom
- Post town: Sevenoaks
- Postcode district: TN15
- Police: Kent
- Fire: Kent
- Ambulance: South East Coast
- UK Parliament: Sevenoaks

Seal Chart is a village 2 miles (3 km) east of Sevenoaks in Kent, England. It is within the Sevenoaks local government district. It is in the civil parish of Seal.
