= Kelvin Hopkins =

British Independent politician

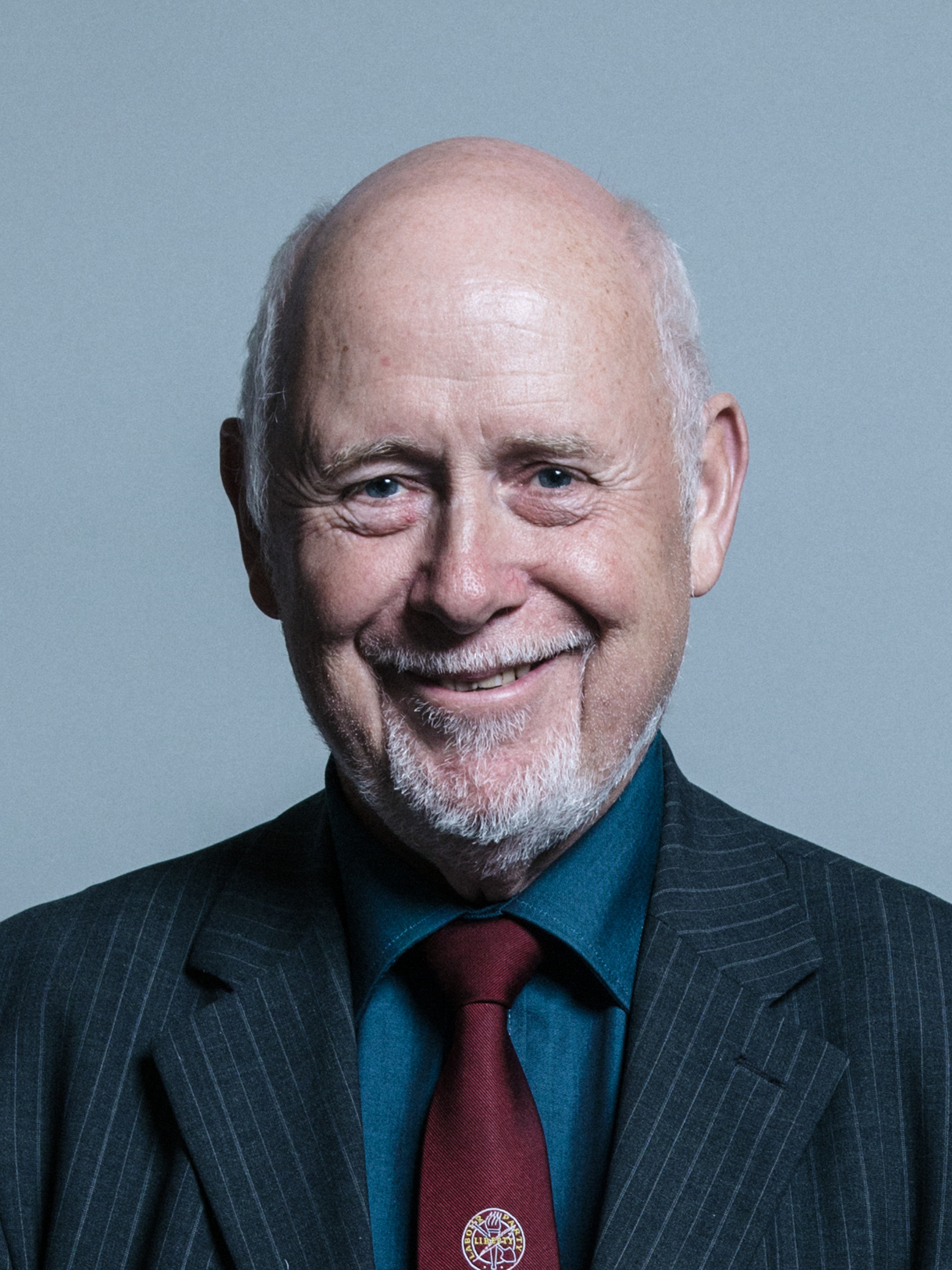
- Official portrait, 2017

Shadow Secretary of State for Culture, Media and Sport
- In office 28 June 2016 – 7 October 2016
- Leader: Jeremy Corbyn
- Preceded by: Maria Eagle
- Succeeded by: Tom Watson

Member of Parliament for Luton North
- In office 1 May 1997 – 6 November 2019
- Preceded by: John Carlisle
- Succeeded by: Sarah Owen

Personal details
- Born: Kelvin Peter Hopkins; 22 August 1941 (age 85) Leicester, England
- Party: Labour (until 2021)
- Spouse: Patricia Langley
- Children: 2 (including Rachel)
- Education: University of Nottingham

Kelvin Peter Hopkins (born 22 August 1941) is a British politician. He was first elected as the Labour Member of Parliament for Luton North in 1997. Hopkins was suspended by the Labour Party in 2017 after allegations of sexual misconduct were made against him in the 2017 Westminster sexual misconduct allegations. Hopkins did not stand for re-election in the 2019 general election.

Hopkins is a supporter of pro-Brexit group Leave Means Leave.

== Background ==
Kelvin Hopkins was born in Leicester, son of physicist Harold Hopkins FRS. He was educated at Queen Elizabeth's Grammar School for Boys, Barnet, north London; he then attended the University of Nottingham where he was awarded a BA degree in Politics, Economics and Mathematics with Statistics. Between 1958 and 1963, he was a "semi-professional" jazz musician, playing tenor saxophone and clarinet.

With the exception of two years as a lecturer at St Albans College of Further Education (now called Oaklands College) from 1971 to 1973, he has worked entirely within the trade union movement. He joined the Trades Union Congress as an economist in 1969, and rejoined it in 1973 following his stint as a lecturer. He was appointed a policy and research officer in NALGO in 1977, leaving its successor UNISON in 1994.

Hopkins was a councillor on Luton Borough Council from 1972 to 1976.

== Parliamentary career ==
Hopkins was the Labour candidate for Luton North at the 1983 general election; he finished in second place, 11,981 votes behind the sitting Conservative MP John Carlisle. Hopkins contested the seat again fourteen years later, at the 1997 general election, successfully gaining it from the Conservatives, with a majority of 9,626 votes and 54.6% of the votes cast. He made his maiden speech in the House of Commons on 28 November 1997.

In the House of Commons, he was a member of the Broadcasting Select committee from 1999 to 2001, and has served on the Public Administration Select Committee since 2002. He also served as an adviser to Richard Caborn on yachting when Caborn was Minister of Sport. Hopkins is a member of many all-party groups. He served as the chairman of the group on further education and lifelong learning, and as the vice-chairman of the groups on jazz appreciation; historic vehicles; Norway; constitution and citizenship; transport infrastructure and trans-European networks. He also served as the treasurer of the group on building societies and financial mutuals. Hopkins was on the left wing of the Labour Party, being a member of the Socialist Campaign Group and is a Eurosceptic. He was known for his rebellious stance amongst Labour MPs, and has been described as a "rebellion prone left-wing economist" by Andrew Roth in The Guardian.

In the fiscal year of 2007–08, Hopkins' total expenses claims amounted to £121,809, of which his second home allowance was £1,242. He also emerged well from the 2009 MPs expenses scandal, being deemed a "saint" by The Daily Telegraph for his minimal second home claims.

In June 2010, he was selected as a Labour member of the Transport Select Committee.

Before the 2016 referendum on British membership of the EU, Hopkins signed the People's Pledge, a cross-party campaign for such a referendum, and became a member of its Advisory Council. He was one of sixteen signatories of an open letter to the-then Labour leader Ed Miliband in January 2015, which called on the party to commit to oppose further austerity, take rail franchises back into public ownership and strengthen collective bargaining arrangements.

He is a supporter of homeopathy, having signed an Early Day Motion in support of its continued funding by the National Health Service.

Hopkins was one of 36 Labour MPs to nominate Jeremy Corbyn as a candidate in the Labour leadership election of 2015. In 2016, he was one of the chief Labour figures to support the "Leave" campaign in the UK Referendum on EU membership. After turning down the offer of a frontbench position when Jeremy Corbyn became leader, Hopkins was "called up" to serve in the Shadow Cabinet following a spate of resignations at the end of June 2016. He was able to return to the backbenches following Corbyn's re-election as party leader and the formation of a new Shadow Cabinet in October.

Hopkins did not stand for re-election in the 2019 general election.

=== Sexual harassment allegations ===
Hopkins was suspended by the Labour Party on 2 November 2017 following allegations made against him which are currently being investigated. According to The Daily Telegraph, Hopkins had allegedly sexually harassed and behaved inappropriately towards a Labour Party activist, Ava Etemadzadeh, now aged 27. The claims were originally brought to the attention of Rosie Winterton in 2015 when she was Labour's Chief Whip. Hopkins has "absolutely and categorically" rejected the accusation of sexual impropriety.

Just over a week later on 10 November, the Labour MP Kerry McCarthy said that Hopkins had been paying her unwanted attention, via written notes, since 1994 when both were chairs of adjacent Constituency Labour Parties in Luton. Allegedly the attention resumed when McCarthy became an MP in 2005 and continued until early 2016. The notes were shown to the Labour whips and have been reproduced in The Guardian. While Hopkins had not been physically abusive towards McCarthy, she told the newspaper's political editor Heather Stewart that "I was really, really wary of him".

Four months later, Etemadzadeh said she was "totally disillusioned" with Labour as she still did not know when her case would be heard.

In January 2021, Hopkins resigned from the Labour Party.

== Personal life ==
Hopkins married Patricia Mabel Langley on 21 August 1965 in Barnet. The couple have a son and a daughter, Rachel, who went on to become MP for Luton South. Hopkins is a French speaker, a keen photographer, saxophonist and enjoys sailing on the Norfolk Broads. He is an Honorary Associate of the National Secular Society. Since 1993, Hopkins has been a governor of Luton Sixth Form College. He has lived in Luton since November 1969.

== Publications ==
- Hopkins, Kelvin (1991). The Economy: A NALGO Review.

- Cited in: Ironside, Mike; Seifert, Roger (2000). "Markets, managers, and the merger". Facing up to Thatcherism: the history of NALGO, 1979-1993. Oxford New York: Oxford University Press. p. 293. ISBN 9780199240753.

Parliament of the United Kingdom
Preceded by John Carlisle	Member of Parliament for Luton North; 1997–2019	Succeeded by Sarah Owen
Political offices
Preceded by Maria Eagle	Shadow Secretary of State for Culture, Media and Sport; 2016	Succeeded by Tom Watson
