= Sarah Owen =

British Labour politician

Sarah Owen MP
- 陳美麗
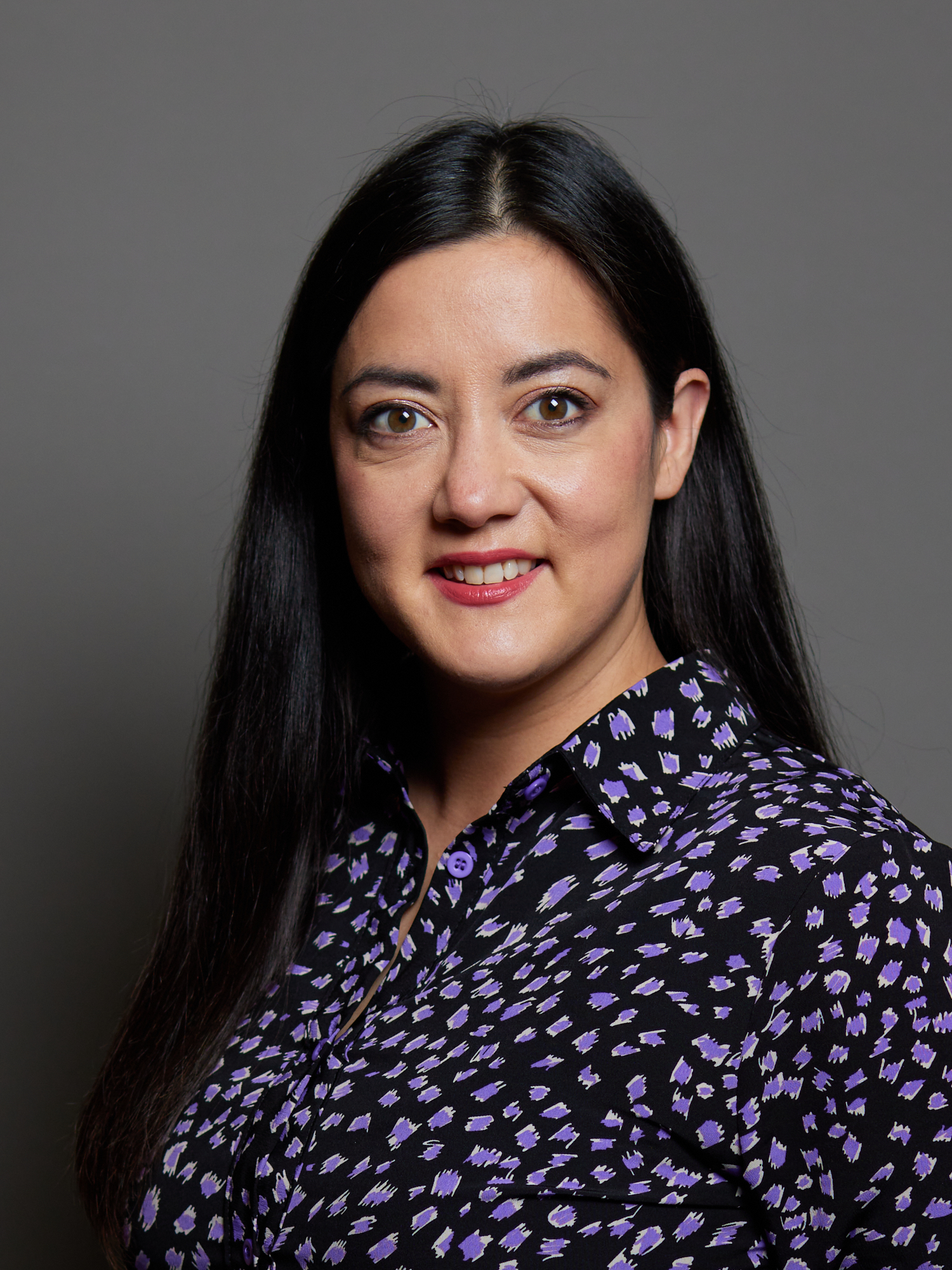
- Official portrait, 2021

Parliamentary Under-Secretary of State for Northern Ireland
- Incumbent
- Assumed office 23 July 2026
- Prime Minister: Andy Burnham
- Preceded by: Matthew Patrick

Chair of the Women and Equalities Committee
- In office 12 September 2024 – 23 July 2026
- Preceded by: Caroline Nokes
- Succeeded by: Olivia Bailey

Member of Parliament for Luton North
- Incumbent
- Assumed office 12 December 2019
- Preceded by: Kelvin Hopkins
- Majority: 7,510 (19.4%)
Shadow portfolios
2022–2023	Local Government and Faith
2021–2023	Whip
2021–2022	Homelessness, Rough Sleeping and Faith

Personal details
- Born: Sarah Mei Li Owen; 11 January 1983 (age 43) Hastings, East Sussex, England
- Party: Labour
- Education: University of Sussex (BA, MA)
- Website: sarahowen.org.uk

Chinese name
- Traditional Chinese: 陳美麗
- Simplified Chinese: 陈美丽
Transcriptions
Standard Mandarin
- Hanyu Pinyin: Chén Měilì
- Wade–Giles: Chen^{2} Mei^{3}-li^{4}

Sarah Mei Li Owen (Chinese: 陳美麗; pinyin: Chén Měilì; Wade–Giles: Chen Mei-li; born 11 January 1983) is a British Labour Party politician and trade unionist who has been the Member of Parliament (MP) for Luton North since 2019. She is the first female MP of Chinese descent.

She served as Shadow Minister for Local Government and Faith from October 2022 to November 2023, having previously served as Shadow Minister for Homelessness, Rough Sleeping and Faith (shadowing the same department) between December 2021 and October 2022. She was Chair of the Women and Equalities Committee from 2024 to 2026, and has served as Parliamentary Under-Secretary of State for Northern Ireland since July 2026.

== Early life and career ==
Sarah Owen was born on 11 January 1983 in Hastings. Her mother's family is of Malaysian Chinese ancestry, described as "Malaysian and a mix of Singaporean and Nonya" with Chinese great-grandparents. Owen graduated from the University of Sussex with a Bachelor of Arts in international relations and a Master of Arts in human rights.

Owen worked in the public sector as a care worker for the NHS, a political assistant for Brighton and Hove City Council and a London Fire Brigade employee in the emergency planning department. Owen has been a political adviser to Alan Sugar and has worked on Labour's national small business policy.

Owen was formerly a political officer for the trade union GMB and has been a member of Labour's National Executive Committee. She is chair of East and South East Asians for Labour.

== Parliamentary career ==
In 2011, Owen was chosen as the Labour Party candidate for Hastings and Rye to contest the next general election. At the 2015 general election, Owen finished in second place with 17,890 votes, which was 4,796 votes behind the elected Conservative candidate Amber Rudd.

In the 2019 general election, Owen was chosen by a panel drawn from Labour's National Executive Committee as the party's candidate for Luton North, rather than by the local membership, causing protests from some of them who felt that GMB had forced the candidate on them. Owen was elected with a vote tally of 23,496, which was a majority of 9,247 votes over the Conservative Party candidate.

On her election, Owen was appointed the Parliamentary private secretary to the Shadow Foreign Secretary Lisa Nandy. On 15 October 2020, Owen resigned her position as PPS to vote against the proposed Covert Human Intelligence Sources (Criminal Conduct) Bill, disagreeing with the Labour Whip to abstain.

On 14 April 2021, Owen announced that she was named Parliamentary Private Secretary to Rachel Reeves and was also appointed a whip.

In December 2021, she was appointed Shadow Minister for Homelessness, Rough Sleeping and Faith. On 28 October 2022, she was appointed Shadow Minister for Local Government, replacing Mike Amesbury who resigned from his post earlier in the year. Her previous portfolio of Faith was retained, and was replaced as Shadow Minister for Homelessness and Rough Sleeping by Paula Barker.

In 2022, she criticised Tory MP Mark Francois for using a "crass racial slur" in the House of Commons, after he had made a speech referring to "Japs".

At the 2024 general election, Owen was re-elected to Parliament as MP for Luton North with a decreased vote share of 37.9% and a decreased majority of 7,510.

On 11 September 2024, Owen was elected as Chair of the Women and Equalities Committee.

Owen joined a group of fellow Labour MPs in calling for the resignation of Prime Minister Keir Starmer in May 2026.

On 23 July 2026, Owen was appointed Parliamentary Under-Secretary of State at the Northern Ireland Office, succeeding Matthew Patrick. On her appointment to government, she stood down as Chair of the Women and Equalities Committee.

== Campaigns ==
=== Miscarriage bereavement leave ===
Owen has spoken about her experiences of miscarrying at work, and campaigned for bereavement leave to be extended to women and their partners who experience the loss of a child before 24 weeks of pregnancy.

In March 2025, the Women and Equalities Committee proposed an amendment to the Employment Rights Bill that would extend this right. The Government accepted the principle of bereavement leave for pregnancy loss and committed to introducing the change during the Bill's progress in the House of Lords.

=== Fireworks ===
Owen has brought forward Private Member's Bills on tightening fireworks laws in 2022 and 2025. Her Bill in 2022 called for stricter enforcement and penalties for firework-related offences, while the 2025 Fireworks Bill called for limits to the noise level and category of fireworks that could be sold to the general public.

=== International affairs ===
Owen is co-Chair of Labour Friends of Palestine and the Middle East. In November 2023, she resigned from the front bench in support of calls for a ceasefire in Gaza.

== Personal life ==
Owen gave birth to a daughter in February 2020. She has previously experienced miscarriages, a topic she spoke about through her union's newsletter for baby loss awareness.

Parliament of the United Kingdom
Preceded by Kelvin Hopkins	Member of Parliament for Luton North; 2019–present	Incumbent
Political offices
Preceded by Matthew Patrick	Parliamentary Under-Secretary of State for Northern Ireland; 2026–present	Incumbent
