= Brian Sedgemore =

British politician (1937–2015)

Member of Parliament for Hackney South and Shoreditch
- In office 9 June 1983 – 11 April 2005
- Preceded by: Ronald Brown
- Succeeded by: Meg Hillier

Member of Parliament for Luton West
- In office 28 February 1974 – 7 April 1979
- Preceded by: Constituency established
- Succeeded by: John Carlisle

Personal details
- Born: Brian Charles John Sedgemore; 17 March 1937 Exmouth, England
- Died: 29 April 2015 (aged 78) London, England
- Party: Liberal Democrats
- Other political affiliations: Labour (before 2005)
- Spouses: Audrey Reece (m. 1964; div. 1985) (m. 2002, died)
- Children: 1
- Education: Hele's School, Exeter
- Alma mater: Corpus Christi College, Oxford

Brian Charles John Sedgemore (17 March 1937 – 29 April 2015) was a British politician who served as a Labour Member of Parliament (MP) from 1974 to 1979, and again from 1983 to 2005. He defected to the Liberal Democrats shortly after standing down from Parliament just before the 2005 general election.

== Early life ==
Brian Sedgemore was born in Exmouth, Devon, and with his two siblings was raised by his mother; his father, a stoker in the Royal Navy, died during active service in the Second World War.

He attended Newtown Primary School in Newtown, Exeter, and Hele's School, Exeter, a grammar school. He did RAF national service from 1956 to 1958. He read PPE at Corpus Christi College, Oxford, and graduated in 1962. While working as a Whitehall civil servant, he trained at night as a barrister specialising in Criminal Law at Middle Temple, London, being called to the bar in 1966. During the 1970s he and fellow barrister David Fingleton contributed pseudonymous articles on politics and the police and criminal justice system to the Private Eye column 'Justinian Forthemoney'. He wrote a number of books including The Secret Constitution and a novel, Power Failure.

== Parliamentary career ==
Sedgemore was first elected to the House of Commons at the February 1974 general election for Luton West, but lost this seat in 1979. In 1976 he voted for Tony Benn, the Energy Secretary, in the Labour leadership election, and during 1978–79 served as Benn's Parliamentary Private Secretary, or PPS. Early in 1979 he was forced to resign over a leak of Treasury papers on the European Exchange Rate Mechanism to the Treasury Select Committee. Having lost his seat, he worked as a journalist for Granada Television.

Sedgemore returned to Parliament at the 1983 general election, as the MP for Hackney South and Shoreditch, and stood down at the 2005 general election. Sedgemore succeeded Ronald Brown, who had defected from Labour to the Social Democratic Party (SDP), as the member for Shoreditch.

=== Europe ===
Initially, he was a member of the (now Socialist) Campaign Group, but he left the faction when he reversed his hostility to the (then) European Communities in the late 1980s. He was later one of only five Labour MPs to vote for the Third Reading of the Maastricht Treaty in 1993, defying his party Whip, which was to abstain.

=== Female Labour MPs ===
On 6 February 1998, in a controversial speech at the Tate Gallery (now Tate Britain), he disparaged the 1997 intake of female Labour MPs as "Stepford Wives…who've had the chip inserted into their brain to keep them on message and who collectively put down women and children in the vote on lone parent benefits" — in the previous month benefits had been reduced for this group of (mainly) women. In the 2001–2005 parliament he was the fifth-most frequent rebel on the Labour benches in divisions on government motions, and the tenth-most frequent rebel on motions put forward by his own party.

=== Defection ===
On 25 April 2005, when he was no longer an MP during the run-up to the 2005 general election, he announced he would be defecting to the Liberal Democrats, citing the invasion of Iraq – of which he had been a long-term critic – university tuition fees and anti-terrorism laws as reasons for his defection and Blair's "scorn for liberal Britain". He made various comments about Tony Blair being a liar; Blair responded on a live BBC television broadcast, saying "He was not present at any meeting I had with George Bush and I don't remember having any conversation on the issue with Brian Sedgemore". Lib Dem leader Charles Kennedy called Sedgemore's defection "a pivotal moment" in the election campaign.

== Personal life ==
He was an Honorary Associate of the National Secular Society and a Distinguished Supporter of the British Humanist Association.

He married Audrey Reece, a fellow barrister, in 1964; they had a son. They divorced in 1985 and remarried in 2002.

Sedgemore died in 2015 after a fall in hospital while recovering from kidney surgery.

Parliament of the United Kingdom
New constituency	Member of Parliament for Luton West; February 1974–1979	Succeeded by John Carlisle
Preceded by Ronald Brown	Member of Parliament for Hackney South and Shoreditch; 1983–2005	Succeeded by Meg Hillier
