= Luton South and South Bedfordshire =

UK Parliament constituency (since 1983)

- Borough constituency for the House of Commons
- Interactive map of boundaries from 2024
- Location within the East of England
- Local government in England: Bedfordshire
- Electorate: 70,197 (March 2020)
- Major settlements: Luton (part)

Current constituency
- Created: 1983
- Member of Parliament: Rachel Hopkins (Labour)
- Seats: One
- Created from: Luton East, Luton West and Bedfordshire South

Luton South and South Bedfordshire is a constituency (Note: A borough constituency (for the purposes of election expenses and type of returning officer).) in Bedfordshire represented in the House of Commons of the UK Parliament since 2019 by Rachel Hopkins, a member of the Labour Party. (Note: As with all constituencies, the constituency elects one Member of Parliament (MP) by the first past the post system of election at least every five years.)

Although the constituency had always, since its creation in 1983, contained small areas of the former District of South Bedfordshire, it was formally known as Luton South up until the 2024 general election. Further to the 2023 review of Westminster constituencies, the Boundary Commission for England recommended that it be officially renamed Luton South and South Bedfordshire.

== Constituency profile ==
The constituency covers the southern and eastern areas of Luton, inclusive of the town centre and Luton Airport. It also comprises the rural country house estate of Luton Hoo, in addition to the late medieval Someries Castle, and the villages/hamlets, extending south to the border of Hertfordshire and the town of Harpenden. The areas of Luton it spans include Stopsley, Wigmore, Butterfield Green, Hart Hill, Wardown Park, Bury Park, Dallow, Farley Hill, New Town, and Stockwood Park.

Outside of the actual Borough of Luton, it also encompasses the small village of East Hyde on the Hertfordshire border, as well as Slip End and Caddington, which are near the M1 motorway. From 2024, the boundaries were expanded to include the village of Eaton Bray.

Demographically, the constituency is mixed, with large southern Asian communities in the Bury Park and Farley Hill areas. The largest community is White British, though Africans and Afro-Caribbeans, as well as newer immigrant arrivals from Eastern Europe, form substantial parts of the population.

The town centre features The Mall Luton (the town's main shopping centre), the University of Bedfordshire Luton campus, and various amenities such as The Galaxy entertainment complex, and Luton railway station on the Midland Main Line. Luton Town FC, currently of the Premier League, is within the constituency, as would be their intended new home stadium at Power Court (to the immediate east of The Mall Luton). The railway station serving London Luton Airport, Luton Airport Parkway, is also within the constituency. A new rail link was constructed between this station and the airport, which opened on 10 March 2023.

Vauxhall still makes vehicles in this area, although the operations have reduced greatly since a large part of the facility closed in the early 2000s.

== History ==
This seat was created in 1983, primarily from the former seat of Luton East.

The constituency and its predecessors the Luton East and Luton constituencies were long considered a bellwether (they had elected an MP from the winning party in each election since the 1951 general election). Margaret Moran, who was the Labour MP from 1997, stood down at the 2010 general election after falsifying claims for her expenses.

Bellwether status ended in the 2010 general election, when the constituency elected a Labour MP while the Conservatives were the largest party in the House of Commons. As a result, its new MP Gavin Shuker became one of just two Labour MPs elected in 2010 in the East of England, alongside Kelvin Hopkins, the MP for the Luton North seat. Shuker and Hopkins served as MPs for the two divisions of Luton at the two subsequent elections with increasing majorities, although the majority in South has not been larger than that of North since 2001.

In the 2019 general election, Shuker stood as an independent but was defeated by the Labour Party candidate, Rachel Hopkins – the daughter of Kelvin, who did not stand in Luton North after losing the Labour whip in 2017.

== Boundaries and boundary changes ==
=== Historic (Luton South) ===
==== 1983–1997 ====
- The Borough of Luton wards of Biscot, Crawley, Dallow, Farley, High Town, Putteridge, Saints, South, and Stopsley; and
- The District of South Bedfordshire wards of Caddington and Slip End.

This was a new constituency incorporating the abolished constituency of Luton East. It also included the southernmost parts of the abolished constituency of Luton West and a small part from the south-east of the abolished constituency of South Bedfordshire.

==== 1997–2010 ====
- The Borough of Luton wards of Biscot, Crawley, Dallow, Farley, High Town, Putteridge, South, and Stopsley; and
- The District of South Bedfordshire wards of Caddington and Slip End.

The Saints ward was transferred to Luton North.

Map of boundaries 2010-2024

==== 2010–2024 ====
- The Borough of Luton wards of Biscot, Crawley, Dallow, Farley, High Town, Round Green, South, Stopsley, and Wigmore; and
- The District of South Bedfordshire ward of Caddington, Hyde and Slip End.

Marginal changes due to revision of local authority wards.

NB: Following the conversion to unitary councils in Bedfordshire in 2009, the wards of the district of South Bedfordshire formed the majority of the Caddington ward of the Central Bedfordshire unitary authority, the former wards having been abolished with effect from May 2011.

=== Current (Luton South and South Bedfordshire) ===
Further to the 2023 review of Westminster constituencies, which came into effect for the 2024 general election, the composition of the renamed constituency was defined as follows (as they existed on 1 December 2020):

- The District of Central Bedfordshire wards of Caddington; Eaton Bray.
- The Borough of Luton wards of: Biscot; Crawley; Dallow; Farley; High Town; Round Green; South; Wigmore.

The Luton Borough ward of Stopsley was transferred to Luton North, partly offset by the addition of Eaton Bray and the remainder of the Caddington ward from the abolished constituency of South West Bedfordshire (renamed Dunstable and Leighton Buzzard).

Following local government boundary reviews in Central Bedfordshire and Luton which came into effect in May 2023, the constituency now comprises the following from the 2024 general election:

- The District of Central Bedfordshire wards of Caddington; Eaton Bray.
- The Borough of Luton wards of: Biscot; Beech Hill (majority); Central; Dallow; Farley; High Town; Round Green; South; Stopsley (part); Vauxhall; Wigmore; and very small parts of Barnfield, Challney and Saints wards.

== Members of Parliament ==
Luton East, Luton West and Bedfordshire South prior to 1983

Election	Member	Party
1983	Graham Bright	Conservative
1997	Margaret Moran	Labour
2010	Gavin Shuker	Labour Co-op
2019	Gavin Shuker	Change UK
2019	Gavin Shuker	Independent
2019	Gavin Shuker	The Independents
2019	Rachel Hopkins	Labour

== Elections ==
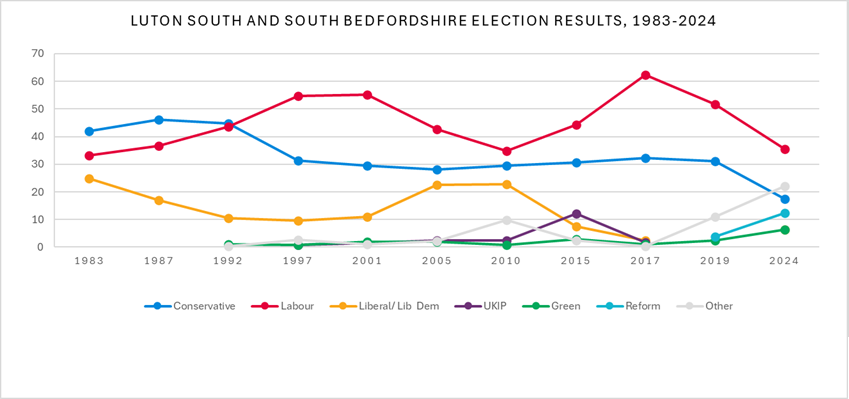
Luton South & South Bedfordshire election results 1983-2024

=== Elections in the 2020s ===
General election 2024: Luton South and South Bedfordshire
Party	Candidate	Votes	%	±%
Labour	Rachel Hopkins	13,593	35.4	–13.3
Conservative	Mark Versallion	6,735	17.5	–17.7
Independent	Attiq Malik	5,384	14.0	N/A
Reform	Norman Maclean	4,759	12.4	+9.1
Workers Party	Yasin Rehman	3,110	8.1	N/A
Green	Edward Carpenter	2,401	6.3	+3.6
Liberal Democrats	Dominic Griffiths	2,400	6.3	+5.8
Majority		6,858	17.9	–2.9
Turnout		38,382	49.9	–14.3
Registered electors		76,970		
Labour hold		Swing	▲2.2	

=== Elections in the 2010s ===
2019 notional result
Party	Vote	%
Labour	21,942	48.7
Conservative	15,876	35.2
Others	4,359	9.7
Brexit Party	1,497	3.3
Green	1,201	2.7
Liberal Democrats	225	0.5
Turnout	45,100	64.2
Electorate	70,197	

Incumbent MP Gavin Shuker (formerly Labour) unsuccessfully sought reelection as an independent candidate. On 2 November 2019, the Liberal Democrats decided not to stand a candidate and endorsed Shuker.

General election 2019: Luton South
Party	Candidate	Votes	%	±%
Labour	Rachel Hopkins	21,787	51.8	–10.6
Conservative	Parvez Akhtar	13,031	31.0	–1.3
Independent	Gavin Shuker	3,893	9.2	N/A
Brexit Party	Garry Warren	1,601	3.8	N/A
Green	Ben Foley	995	2.4	+1.4
Independent	Mohammed Ashraf	489	1.2	N/A
Best4Luton	John French	268	0.6	N/A
Majority		8,756	20.8	–9.3
Turnout		42,064	60.7	–8.1
Labour hold		Swing	–4.7	

General election 2017: Luton South
Party	Candidate	Votes	%	±%
Labour Co-op	Gavin Shuker	28,804	62.4	+18.2
Conservative	Dean Russell	14,879	32.3	+1.6
Liberal Democrats	Andy Strange	1,056	2.3	−5.2
UKIP	Ujjawal Ub	795	1.7	−10.4
Green	Marc Scheimann	439	1.0	−2.0
Independent	Abid Ali	160	0.3	N/A
Majority		13,925	30.1	+16.6
Turnout		46,233	68.8	+6.0
Labour Co-op hold		Swing	+8.3	

General election 2015: Luton South
Party	Candidate	Votes	%	±%
Labour Co-op	Gavin Shuker	18,660	44.2	+9.3
Conservative	Katie Redmond	12,949	30.7	+1.3
UKIP	Muhammad Rehman	5,129	12.1	+9.8
Liberal Democrats	Ashuk Ahmed	3,183	7.5	−15.2
Green	Simon Hall	1,237	2.9	+2.0
Independent	Attiq Malik	900	2.1	N/A
Liberty GB	Paul Weston	158	0.4	N/A
Majority		5,711	13.5	+8.0
Turnout		42,216	62.8	−2.0
Labour Co-op hold		Swing		

General election 2010: Luton South
Party	Candidate	Votes	%	±%
Labour Co-op	Gavin Shuker	14,725	34.9	−7.9
Conservative	Nigel Huddleston	12,396	29.4	+1.3
Liberal Democrats	Qurban Hussain	9,567	22.7	+0.1
Independent	Esther Rantzen	1,872	4.4	N/A
BNP	Tony Blakey	1,299	3.1	N/A
UKIP	Charles Lawman	975	2.3	−0.1
Independent	Stephen Rhodes	463	1.1	N/A
Green	Marc Scheimann	366	0.9	−1.2
Independent	Joe Hall	264	0.6	N/A
Independent	Faruk Choudhury	130	0.3	N/A
Independent	Stephen Lathwell	84	0.2	N/A
Workers Revolutionary	Frank Sweeney	75	0.2	−0.1
Majority		2,329	5.5	−9.0
Turnout		42,216	64.8	+11.0
Labour Co-op hold		Swing	−4.6	

=== Elections in the 2000s ===
General election 2005: Luton South
Party	Candidate	Votes	%	±%
Labour	Margaret Moran	16,610	42.7	−12.5
Conservative	Richard Stay	10,960	28.2	−1.2
Liberal Democrats	Qurban Hussain	8,778	22.6	+11.7
UKIP	Charles Lawman	957	2.5	+1.0
Green	Marc Scheimann	790	2.0	0.0
Respect	Mohammed Ilyas	725	1.9	N/A
Workers Revolutionary	Arthur Lynn	98	0.3	0.0
Majority		5,650	14.5	−11.3
Turnout		38,918	54.1	−1.0
Labour hold		Swing	−5.6	

General election 2001: Luton South
Party	Candidate	Votes	%	±%
Labour	Margaret Moran	21,719	55.2	+0.4
Conservative	Gordon Henderson	11,586	29.4	−2.0
Liberal Democrats	Rabi Martins	4,292	10.9	+1.3
Green	Marc Scheimann	798	2.0	+1.3
UKIP	Charles Lawman	578	1.5	+0.7
Socialist Alliance	Joseph Hearne	271	0.7	N/A
Workers Revolutionary	Robert Bolton	107	0.3	N/A
Majority		10,133	25.8	+2.4
Turnout		39,351	55.1	−15.3
Labour hold		Swing		

=== Elections in the 1990s ===
General election 1997: Luton South
Party	Candidate	Votes	%	±%
Labour	Margaret Moran	26,428	54.8	+11.6
Conservative	Graham Bright	15,109	31.4	−12.9
Liberal Democrats	Keith Fitchett	4,610	9.6	−1.6
Referendum	Clive Jacobs	1,205	2.5	N/A
UKIP	Charlie Lawman	390	0.8	N/A
Green	Marc Scheimann	356	0.7	−0.3
Natural Law	Claire Perrin	86	0.2	−0.1
Majority		11,319	23.4	N/A
Turnout		48,184	70.4	−8.7
Labour gain from Conservative		Swing		

General election 1992: Luton South
Party	Candidate	Votes	%	±%
Conservative	Graham Bright	25,900	44.8	−1.4
Labour	Bill McKenzie	25,101	43.5	+6.8
Liberal Democrats	David W. Rogers	6,020	10.4	−6.7
Green	Lyn Bliss	550	1.0	N/A
Natural Law	David Cooke	191	0.3	N/A
Majority		799	1.3	−8.2
Turnout		57,762	79.1	+3.9
Conservative hold		Swing	−4.1	

=== Elections in the 1980s ===
General election 1987: Luton South
Party	Candidate	Votes	%	±%
Conservative	Graham Bright	24,762	46.2	+4.3
Labour	Bill McKenzie	19,647	36.7	+3.4
Liberal	Peter Chapman	9,146	17.1	−7.8
Majority		5,115	9.5	+0.9
Turnout		53,555	75.2	−0.6
Conservative hold		Swing		

General election 1983: Luton South
Party	Candidate	Votes	%	±%
Conservative	Graham Bright	22,531	41.9	
Labour	Ivor Clemitson	17,910	33.3	
Liberal	David Franks	13,395	24.9	
Majority		4,621	8.6	
Turnout		53,836	75.8	
Conservative win (new seat)				

== See also ==
- Parliamentary constituencies in Bedfordshire
- List of parliamentary constituencies in the East of England (region)
- Politics in Luton
