= Luton West =

UK Parliament constituency (1974–1983)

- Former borough constituency for the House of Commons
- Boundary of Luton West in Bedfordshire, boundaries 1974-83
- County: Bedfordshire
- Major settlements: Luton

1974–1983
- Seats: One
- Created from: Luton and South Bedfordshire
- Replaced by: Luton North and Luton South

Luton West was a United Kingdom Parliamentary constituency. It was created in 1974 parts of the abolished Luton constituency and parts of South Bedfordshire. It was abolished in 1983 when it was largely absorbed into the new constituency of Luton North.

== Boundaries ==
The County Borough of Luton wards of Dallow, Icknield, Leagrave, Lewsey, Limbury, and Sundon Park.

Formed for the February 1974 general election primarily from the Leagrave and Limbury wards of the County Borough, previously part of South Bedfordshire. Remaining wards were previously part of the abolished constituency of Luton.

Abolished for the 1983 general election when it was largely absorbed into the new constituency of North Luton, with the exception of southernmost-parts, including Dallow ward, which were included in Luton South.

== Members of Parliament ==
Election	Member	Party
Feb 1974	Brian Sedgemore	Labour
1979	John Carlisle	Conservative
1983	Constituency abolished	

== Elections ==
General election February 1974: Luton West
Party	Candidate	Votes	%	±%
Labour	Brian Sedgemore	20,083	42.00	
Conservative	Robert Atkins	15,041	31.47	
Liberal	M Dolling	12,669	26.51	
Majority		5,042	10.43	
Turnout		47,793	82.83	
Labour win (new seat)				

General election October 1974: Luton West
Party	Candidate	Votes	%	±%
Labour	Brian Sedgemore	20,402	46.74	▲4.72
Conservative	Robert Atkins	13,963	31.99	▲0.52
Liberal	M Dolling	9,289	21.28	▼5.23
Majority		6,439	14.75	
Turnout		43,654	74.91	
Labour hold		Swing	▲2.1	

General election 1979: Luton West
Party	Candidate	Votes	%	±%
Conservative	John Carlisle	21,230	44.09	▲12.10
Labour	Brian Sedgemore	20,984	43.58	▼3.16
Liberal	M Dolling	5,233	10.87	▼10.41
National Front	D How	701	1.46	New
Majority		246	0.51	N/A
Turnout		48,148	78.69	
Conservative gain from Labour		Swing	▲7.63	

== See also ==
- List of former United Kingdom Parliament constituencies
