= Rachel Hopkins =

British Labour politician, MP for Luton South

Rachel Hopkins MP
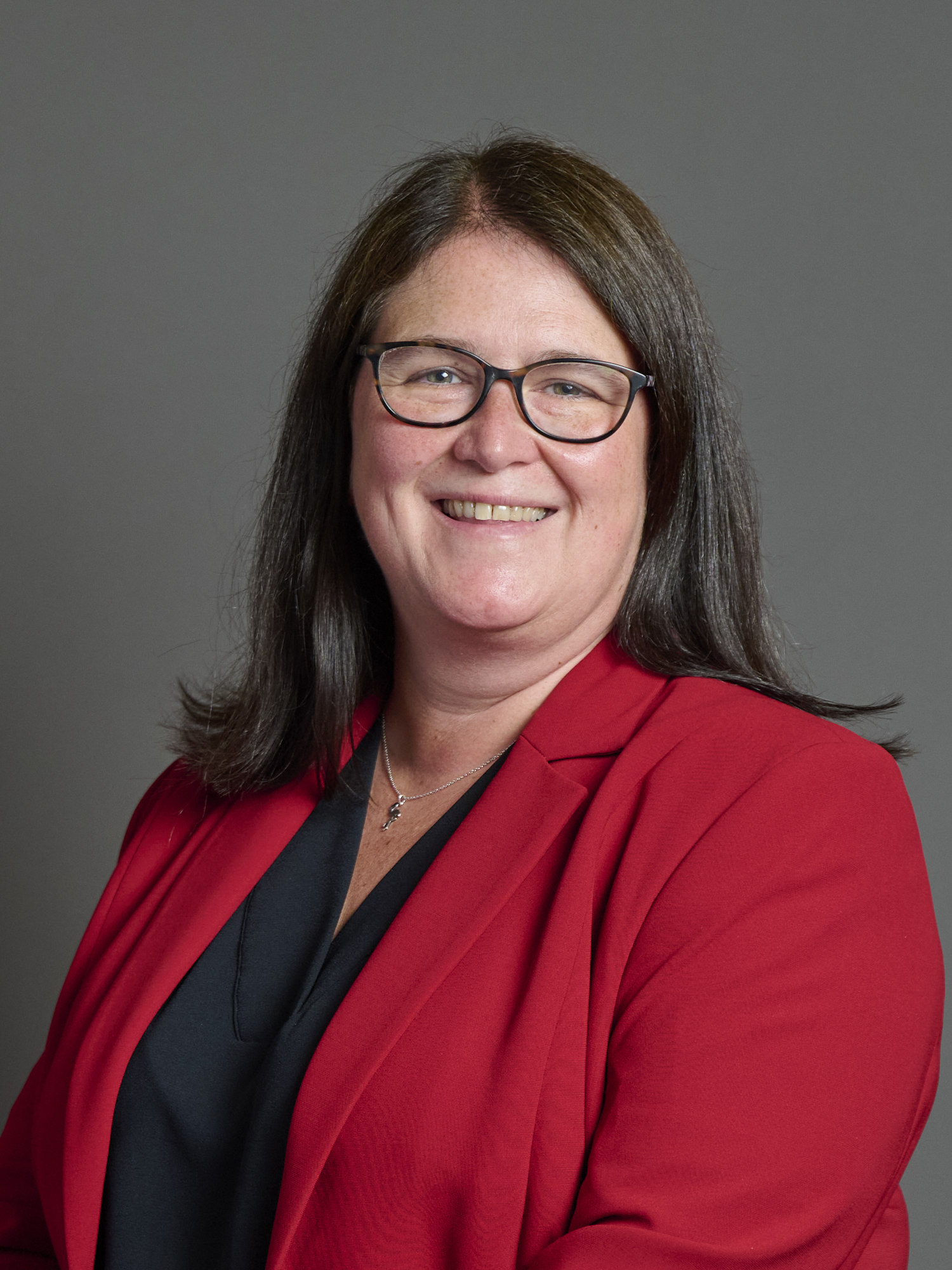
- Official portrait, 2024

Member of Parliament for Luton South and South Bedfordshire Luton South (2019–2024)
- Incumbent
- Assumed office 12 December 2019
- Preceded by: Gavin Shuker
- Majority: 6,858 (17.9%)
Shadow portfolios
2022–2023	Veterans
2021–2022	Cabinet Office

Member of Luton Council
- In office 5 May 2011 – March 2021
- Ward: Barnfield (2011–2019); High Town (2019–2021)
- Succeeded by: Umme Ali

Personal details
- Born: Rachel Louise Hopkins; 30 March 1972 (age 54) Luton, Bedfordshire, England
- Party: Labour
- Parent: Kelvin Hopkins (father)
- Relatives: Harold Hopkins (grandfather)
- Website: rachelhopkins.org

Rachel Louise Hopkins (born 30 March 1972) is a British Labour politician who has served as Member of Parliament (MP) for Luton South and South Bedfordshire, formerly Luton South, since 2019.

Hopkins was a Member of Luton Borough Council from 2011 to 2021, on which she served as Executive Member for Public Health. She served as Shadow Minister for the Cabinet Office from 2021 to 2023.

== Early life and career ==
Rachel Hopkins was born on 30 March 1972 in Luton and Dunstable University Hospital, Luton, and raised in Biscot. Her father, Kelvin, served as Labour MP for Luton North from 1997 to 2019. Her grandfather, Harold, was a physicist twice nominated for a Nobel Prize. She attended Denbigh High School and then Luton Sixth Form College, before going on to study at the University of Leicester. Her first full-time job was at TSB Bank. She later studied part-time for a master's degree from the University of Bedfordshire.

Hopkins previously worked at the Electoral Commission and the Human Fertilisation and Embryology Authority. She has been a governor for Luton Sixth Form College since 2014.

Hopkins served on Luton Borough Council from May 2011 until her resignation in March 2021, and was Executive Member for Public Health on the council.

== Parliamentary career ==
On Friday 1 November 2019, she was selected as the Labour candidate for Luton South. She was selected by a panel of four, rather than by the local membership. At the 2019 general election, Hopkins was elected to Parliament as MP for Luton South with 51.8% of the vote and a majority of 8,756.

Hopkins is considered to be on the left of the Labour Party, and joined the Socialist Campaign Group upon her election to Parliament. In May 2024, PoliticsHome reported that she had left the Campaign Group.

She voted for Brexit in the 2016 EU referendum, making her one of the few known Labour MPs to have done so.

Hopkins was appointed Parliamentary private secretary (PPS) to the Shadow Women and Equalities Secretary, Marsha de Cordova, in May 2020. Hopkins resigned from the position to vote against the Covert Human Intelligence Sources (Criminal Conduct) Bill, rebelling against the Labour whip. She became a PPS once again in May 2021, this time to Shadow Defence Secretary John Healey.

Hopkins was appointed as a Shadow Cabinet Office Minister in the December 2021 opposition front bench reshuffle. She was appointed Shadow Minister for Veterans and Defence people in July 2022.

In November 2023, she resigned from the frontbench to vote for a ceasefire in Gaza.

Due to the 2023 review of Westminster constituencies, Hopkins' constituency of Luton South was abolished, and replaced with Luton South and South Bedfordshire. At the 2024 general election, Hopkins was elected to Parliament as MP for Luton South and South Bedfordshire with 35.4% of the vote and a majority of 6,858.

After Labour entered government in July 2024, Hopkins served as Parliamentary Private Secretary to Defence Secretary John Healey until she resigned in June 2026. She serves on the Speaker's Committee on the Electoral Commission and the Modernisation Committee.

Hopkins was a co-sponsor of Kim Leadbeater's Terminally Ill Adults (End of Life) Bill on assisted suicide.

== Personal life ==
She currently lives in High Town, Luton with her partner, Iain Sinclair. She was previously married but now divorced.

A humanist, she was elected Vice Chair of the All-Party Parliamentary Humanist Group in 2022.

Parliament of the United Kingdom
Preceded by Gavin Shuker	Member of Parliament for Luton South; 2019–present	Incumbent
