= Luton North =

UK Parliament constituency (since 1983)

Coordinates: 51.902°N 0.446°W

- Borough constituency for the House of Commons
- Interactive map of boundaries from 2024
- Location within the East of England
- Local government in England: Bedfordshire
- Electorate: 73,266 (March 2020)
- Major settlements: Luton

Current constituency
- Created: 1983
- Member of Parliament: Sarah Owen (Labour Party)
- Seats: One
- Created from: Luton West, Mid Bedfordshire, South Bedfordshire and Luton East

Luton North is a constituency (Note: A borough constituency (for the purposes of election expenses and type of returning officer).) represented in the House of Commons of the UK Parliament since 2019 by Sarah Owen, of the Labour Party. (Note: As with all constituencies, the constituency elects one Member of Parliament (MP) by the first past the post system of election at least every five years.)

== Constituency profile ==
Luton North is a mostly suburban constituency located in Bedfordshire. It covers the northern neighbourhoods of the large town of Luton, including Stopsley, Bramingham, Limbury, Sundon Park, Leagrave, Marsh Farm, Lewsey and Challney. Luton has an industrial history; the town was an important centre for the manufacturing of hats and cars. The neighbourhoods of Luton North were developed in the 1950s and 1960s, largely as council housing, to accommodate industrial workers and overspill from London. The constituency has high levels of deprivation, mostly in its west, whilst the eastern areas are more affluent. House prices are lower than the East of England and nationwide averages.

In general, residents of Luton North are young and have low rates of education and professional employment. Household income is similar to the national average. A high proportion of residents work in the health and education sectors, and the percentage of residents claiming unemployment benefits is high. The child poverty rate is higher than the rest of the country and almost double the regional rate. White people made up 44% of the population at the 2021 census, including large Irish, Polish and Romanian communities. Asians, most of whom are of Pakistani origin, were 38% of the population and Black people were 11%. At the local borough council, most of the constituency is represented by Labour Party councillors with some Conservatives and Liberal Democrats elected in the constituency's wealthier east. An estimated 58% of voters in Luton North supported leaving the European Union in the 2016 referendum, higher than the nationwide figure of 52%.

== History ==
At creation, Luton North included eight wards from the neighbouring districts of Mid Bedfordshire and South Bedfordshire; these made it a much safer seat for the Conservatives than Luton South, which included only one ward from outside the Borough of Luton. Boundary changes in 1997 reduced the Conservative majority from 13,094 to 7,357, and it was 81st on Labour's list of target seats; Labour duly gained it on a 17.1% swing, and since then the party has held the seat with comfortable majorities.

From 2005 to 2015, Luton North was Labour's safest seat in the East of England by both vote and vote share majority; in 2017 it was overtaken in the former count by Norwich South, but the percentage margin in Luton North (30.8% compared to 30.4% in Norwich South) is slightly higher.

== Boundaries and boundary changes ==
=== Historic ===
==== 1983–1997 ====
- The Borough of Luton wards of Bramingham, Challney, Icknield, Leagrave, Lewsey, Limbury, and Sundon Park;
- The District of Mid Bedfordshire wards of Flitton and Pulloxhill, Flitwick East, Flitwick West, Harlington, and Westoning; and
- The District of South Bedfordshire wards of Barton-le-Clay, Streatley, and Toddington.

Created as a county constituency formally named North Luton, incorporating the bulk of the abolished borough constituency of Luton West. Extended northwards to include part of the abolished constituency of South Bedfordshire as well as Flitwick, transferred from Mid Bedfordshire.

==== 1997–2010 ====
Map of boundaries 2010-2024

- The Borough of Luton wards of Bramingham, Challney, Icknield, Leagrave, Lewsey, Limbury, Saints, and Sundon Park.

Redesignated as the borough constituency of Luton North. The parts of the Districts of Mid Bedfordshire (including Flitwick) and South Bedfordshire transferred to Mid Bedfordshire. Gained the Saints ward of the Borough of Luton from Luton South.

==== 2010–2024 ====
- The Borough of Luton wards of Barnfield, Bramingham, Challney, Icknield, Leagrave, Lewsey, Limbury, Northwell, Saints, and Sundon Park.

Marginal changes due to revision of local authority wards.

=== Current ===
Further to the 2023 review of Westminster constituencies, which came into effect for the 2024 general election, the composition of the constituency was expanded with the transfer of the Luton Borough ward of Stopsley (as it existed on 1 December 2020) from Luton South.

Following a local government boundary review which came into effect in May 2023, the constituency now comprises the following wards of the Borough of Luton from the 2024 general election:

- Barnfield (nearly all); Beech Hill (part); Bramingham; Challney (nearly all); Leagrave; Lewsey; Limbury; Northwell; Poets; Saints (nearly all); Sundon Park; Stopsley (majority).

== Members of Parliament ==
Luton West, Luton East, Mid Bedfordshire and South Bedfordshire prior to 1983

Election	Member	Party
1983	John Carlisle	Conservative
1997	Kelvin Hopkins	Labour
2017	Kelvin Hopkins	Independent
2019	Sarah Owen	Labour

== Elections ==
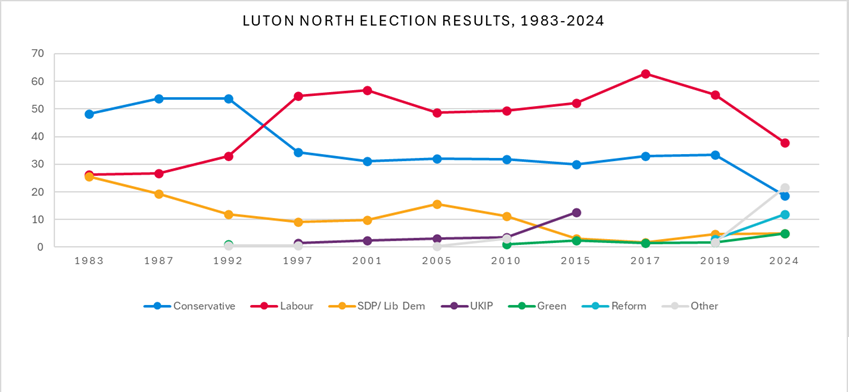
Luton North election results 1983-2024

=== Elections in the 2020s ===
General election 2024: Luton North
Party	Candidate	Votes	%	±%
Labour	Sarah Owen	14,677	37.9	−16.0
Conservative	Jilleane Brown	7,167	18.5	−15.8
Reform	James Fletcher	4,666	12.0	+9.0
Independent	Toqueer Shah	4,393	11.3	N/A
Workers Party	Waheed Akbar	3,914	10.1	N/A
Green	Ejel Khan	1,940	5.0	+3.1
Liberal Democrats	Sean Prendergast	1,890	4.9	+0.3
SDP	Paul Trathen	98	0.3	N/A
Majority		7,510	19.4	−11.4
Turnout		38,745	51.8	–9.1
Registered electors		74,866		
Labour hold		Swing	▼0.1	

=== Elections in the 2010s ===
2019 notional result
Party	Vote	%
Labour	24,015	53.9
Conservative	15,275	34.3
Liberal Democrats	2,063	4.6
Brexit Party	1,319	3.0
Others	1,086	2.4
Green	832	1.9
Turnout	44,590	60.9
Electorate	73,266	

General election 2019: Luton North
Party	Candidate	Votes	%	±%
Labour	Sarah Owen	23,496	55.2	−8.6
Conservative	Jeet Bains	14,249	33.5	+0.5
Liberal Democrats	Linda Jack	2,063	4.8	+3.1
Brexit Party	Sudhir Sharma	1,215	2.9	N/A
Green	Simon Hall	771	1.8	+0.4
Independent	Muhammad Rehman	646	1.5	N/A
Women's Equality	Serena Laidley	149	0.3	N/A
Majority		9,247	21.7	−9.1
Turnout		42,589	62.5	−8.5
Labour hold		Swing		

General election 2017: Luton North
Party	Candidate	Votes	%	±%
Labour	Kelvin Hopkins	29,765	63.8	+11.6
Conservative	Caroline Kerswell	15,401	33.0	+3.1
Liberal Democrats	Rabi Martins	808	1.7	−1.4
Green	Simon Hall	648	1.4	−0.9
Majority		14,364	30.8	+8.5
Turnout		46,622	71.0	+7.0
Labour hold		Swing	+4.3	

General election 2015: Luton North
Party	Candidate	Votes	%	±%
Labour	Kelvin Hopkins	22,243	52.2	+2.9
Conservative	Dean Russell	12,739	29.9	−1.9
UKIP	Allan White	5,318	12.5	+8.9
Liberal Democrats	Aroosa Ulzaman	1,299	3.1	−8.0
Green	Sofiya Ahmed	972	2.3	+1.2
Majority		9,504	22.3	+4.8
Turnout		42,571	64.0	−1.5
Labour hold		Swing	+2.4	

General election 2010: Luton North
Party	Candidate	Votes	%	±%
Labour	Kelvin Hopkins	21,192	49.3	+0.7
Conservative	Jeremy Brier	13,672	31.8	−0.4
Liberal Democrats	Rabi Martins	4,784	11.1	−4.5
UKIP	Colin Brown	1,564	3.6	+0.4
BNP	Shelley Rose	1,316	3.1	N/A
Green	Simon Hall	490	1.1	N/A
Majority		7,520	17.5	+0.9
Turnout		43,018	65.5	+8.6
Labour hold		Swing	+0.5	

=== Elections in the 2000s ===
General election 2005: Luton North
Party	Candidate	Votes	%	±%
Labour	Kelvin Hopkins	19,062	48.7	−8.0
Conservative	Hannah Hall	12,575	32.1	+0.9
Liberal Democrats	Linda Jack	6,081	15.5	+5.8
UKIP	Colin Brown	1,255	3.2	+0.8
Open Forum	Kayson Gurney	149	0.4	N/A
Majority		6,487	16.6	−8.9
Turnout		39,122	57.4	−0.5
Labour hold		Swing	−4.5	

General election 2001: Luton North
Party	Candidate	Votes	%	±%
Labour	Kelvin Hopkins	22,187	56.7	+2.1
Conservative	Amanda Sater	12,210	31.2	−3.1
Liberal Democrats	Robert Hoyle	3,795	9.7	+0.6
UKIP	Colin Brown	934	2.4	+0.9
Majority		9,977	25.5	+5.2
Turnout		39,126	57.9	−15.3
Labour hold		Swing		

=== Elections in the 1990s ===
General election 1997: Luton North
Party	Candidate	Votes	%	±%
Labour	Kelvin Hopkins	25,860	54.6	+17.4
Conservative	David Senior	16,234	34.3	−16.9
Liberal Democrats	Kathryn Newbound	4,299	9.1	−1.1
UKIP	Colin Brown	689	1.5	N/A
Natural Law	Aaron Custance	250	0.5	0.0
Majority		9,626	20.3	N/A
Turnout		47,332	73.2	−8.6
Labour gain from Conservative		Swing		

General election 1992: Luton North
Party	Candidate	Votes	%	±%
Conservative	John Carlisle	33,777	53.7	−0.1
Labour	Tony McWalter	20,683	32.9	+6.1
Liberal Democrats	Jane Jackson	7,570	12.0	−7.4
Green	Roger Jones	633	1.0	N/A
Natural Law	Keith Buscombe	292	0.5	N/A
Majority		13,094	20.8	−6.2
Turnout		62,955	81.8	+4.2
Conservative hold		Swing	−3.1	

=== Elections in the 1980s ===
General election 1987: Luton North
Party	Candidate	Votes	%	±%
Conservative	John Carlisle	30,997	53.8	+5.5
Labour	Michael Wright	15,424	26.8	+0.6
SDP	John Stephen	11,166	19.4	−6.1
Majority		15,573	27.0	+4.9
Turnout		57,587	77.6	+0.2
Conservative hold		Swing		

General election 1983: Luton North
Party	Candidate	Votes	%	±%
Conservative	John Carlisle	26,115	48.3	
Labour	Kelvin Hopkins	14,134	26.2	
SDP	John Stephen	13,769	25.5	
Majority		11,981	22.1	
Turnout		54,018	77.4	
Conservative win (new seat)				

== See also ==
- List of parliamentary constituencies in Bedfordshire
- List of parliamentary constituencies in the East of England (region)
- Politics in Luton
