= Official names of United Kingdom parliamentary constituencies in England =

This article lists constituency names A-M. For constituency names N-Z see Official names of United Kingdom parliamentary constituencies in England N–Z.

An index of the constituency articles, showing which constituency names from this list they include, can be found at Index of articles on UK Parliament constituencies in England A-M and Index of articles on UK Parliament constituencies in England N-Z.

The official names of United Kingdom Parliamentary constituencies in England (some of which originate from the names used for constituencies in predecessor Parliaments) are those given in the legal instrument creating the constituency or re-defining it at a re-distribution of seats.

The purpose of this article is to set out official names, taken from official sources wherever possible, to provide a definitive list which can then be used as a resource by those constructing constituency articles and other lists involving constituencies. It is requested that no amendments be made to the list, without a citation from a legal instrument creating the constituency, which has a greater validity than the source currently being used.

The names for the 1707 constituencies are, in general, taken from Namier and Brookes. The alternative forms for names, used in legislation abolishing some of the pre-1832 constituencies or in the case of Mitchell in common use as an alternative name, are included in the note column.

The list includes Greater London constituencies for 1974–1983 with the London Borough prefix as used in the official name. In practice articles have been done without the London Borough name. An example of the difficulty is the Acton constituency. The article which currently (December 2006) exists covers the period 1918–1983. There is a related article for Ealing Acton for the period from 1983. The official name for the constituency 1974-1983 was Ealing Acton but, in accordance with the practice adopted for other Greater London constituencies in the 1974 redistribution, the London Borough prefix was ignored. In the 1983 redistribution the London Borough name was dropped from most Greater London official constituency names, but retained for Ealing Acton.

== A ==
Constituency	1707	1832	1868	1885	1918	1945	1950	1955	1974	1983	1997	2010	Note
Abingdon	1	1	1	1	1	1	1	1	1	*	*	*	
Accrington	*	*	*	1	1	1	1	1	1	*	*	*	
Acton	*	*	*	*	1	1	1	1	*	*	*	*	See Ealing, Acton ^{a}
Aldborough	2	*	*	*	*	*	*	*	*	*	*	*	
Aldeburgh	2	*	*	*	*	*	*	*	*	*	*	*	
Aldershot	*	*	*	*	1	1	1	1	1	1	1	1	
Aldridge-Brownhills	*	*	*	*	*	*	*	*	1	1	1	1	
Altrincham	*	*	*	1	1	*	*	*	*	*	*	*	
Altrincham and Sale	*	*	*	*	*	1	1	1	1	1	*	*	See Altrincham and Sale West
Altrincham and Sale West	*	*	*	*	*	*	*	*	*	*	1	1	
Amber Valley	*	*	*	*	*	*	*	*	*	1	1	1	
Amersham	2	*	*	*	*	*	*	*	*	*	*	*	
Andover	2	2	1	1	*	*	*	*	*	*	*	*	
Appleby	2	*	*	1	*	*	*	*	*	*	*	*	
Arundel	2	1	*	*	*	*	*	*	1	1	*	*	
Arundel and Shoreham	*	*	*	*	*	*	1	1	*	*	*	*	
Arundel and South Downs	*	*	*	*	*	*	*	*	*	*	1	1	
Ashburton	2	1	*	1	*	*	*	*	*	*	*	*	
Ashfield	*	*	*	*	*	*	*	1	1	1	1	1	
Ashford	*	*	*	1	1	1	1	1	1	1	1	1	
Ashton under Lyne	*	*	*	*	*	*	1	1	1	1	*	*	See Ashton-under-Lyne
Ashton-under-Lyne	*	1	1	1	1	1	*	*	*	*	1	1	
Aston Manor	*	*	*	1	*	*	*	*	*	*	*	*	See Birmingham Aston
Aylesbury	2	2	2	1	1	1	1	1	1	1	1	1	

Note:-

- ^{a} Greater London constituency 1974–1983, with London Borough prefix to be ignored.

== B ==
Constituency	1707	1832	1868	1885	1918	1945	1950	1955	1974	1983	1997	2010	Note
Balham and Tooting	*	*	*	*	1	1	*	*	*	*	*	*	
Banbury	1	1	1	1	1	1	1	1	1	1	1	1	
Barking	*	*	*	*	*	1	1	1	1	1	1	1	
Barking, Dagenham	*	*	*	*	*	*	*	*	1	*	*	*	See Dagenham ^{a}
Barkston Ash	*	*	*	1	1	1	1	1	1	*	*	*	
Barnard Castle	*	*	*	1	1	1	*	*	*	*	*	*	
Barnet	*	*	*	*	*	1	1	1	*	*	*	*	
Barnet, Chipping Barnet	*	*	*	*	*	*	*	*	1	*	*	*	See Chipping Barnet ^{a}
Barnet, Finchley	*	*	*	*	*	*	*	*	1	*	*	*	See Finchley ^{a}
Barnet, Hendon North	*	*	*	*	*	*	*	*	1	*	*	*	See Hendon North ^{a}
Barnet, Hendon South	*	*	*	*	*	*	*	*	1	*	*	*	See Hendon South ^{a}
Barnsley	*	*	*	1	1	1	1	1	1	*	*	*	
Barnsley Central	*	*	*	*	*	*	*	*	*	1	1	1	
Barnsley East	*	*	*	*	*	*	*	*	*	1	*	1	
Barnsley East and Mexborough	*	*	*	*	*	*	*	*	*	*	1	*	
Barnsley West and Penistone	*	*	*	*	*	*	*	*	*	1	1	*	
Barnstaple	2	2	2	1	1	1	*	*	*	*	*	*	
Barons Court	*	*	*	*	*	*	*	1	*	*	*	*	
Barrow and Furness	*	*	*	*	*	*	*	*	*	1	1	1	
Barrow in Furness	*	*	*	*	*	*	1	1	1	*	*	*	
Barrow-in-Furness	*	*	*	1	1	1	*	*	*	*	*	*	
Basildon	*	*	*	*	*	*	*	*	1	1	1	*	
Basildon and Billericay	*	*	*	*	*	*	*	*	*	*	*	1	
South Basildon and East Thurrock	*	*	*	*	*	*	*	*	*	*	*	1	
Basingstoke	*	*	*	1	1	1	1	1	1	1	1	1	
Bassetlaw	*	*	*	1	1	1	1	1	1	1	1	1	
Bath	2	2	2	2	1	1	1	1	1	1	1	1	
Batley and Morley	*	*	*	*	1	1	1	1	1	*	*	*	
Batley and Spen	*	*	*	*	*	*	*	*	*	1	1	1	
Battersea	*	*	*	*	*	*	*	*	*	1	1	1	
Battersea and Clapham, Battersea	*	*	*	1	*	*	*	*	*	*	*	*	
Battersea and Clapham, Clapham	*	*	*	1	*	*	*	*	*	*	*	*	
Battersea North	*	*	*	*	1	1	1	1	*	*	*	*	
Battersea South	*	*	*	*	1	1	1	1	*	*	*	*	
Beaconsfield	*	*	*	*	*	*	*	*	1	1	1	1	
Bebington	*	*	*	*	*	*	1	1	*	*	*	*	
Bebington and Ellesmere Port	*	*	*	*	*	*	*	*	1	*	*	*	
Beckenham	*	*	*	*	*	*	1	1	*	1	1	1	
Bedford	2	2	2	1	1	1	1	1	1	*	1	1	
Mid Bedford	*	*	*	*	1	1	*	*	*	*	*	*	
Bedfordshire	2	2	2	*	*	*	*	*	*	*	*	*	
Mid Bedfordshire	*	*	*	*	*	*	*	*	*	1	1	1	
Mid-Bedfordshire	*	*	*	*	*	*	1	1	1	*	*	*	
North Bedfordshire	*	*	*	*	*	*	*	*	*	1	*	*	
North East Bedfordshire	*	*	*	*	*	*	*	*	*	*	1	1	
South Bedfordshire	*	*	*	*	*	*	1	1	1	*	*	*	
South West Bedfordshire	*	*	*	*	*	*	*	*	*	1	1	1	
Beeston	*	*	*	*	*	*	*	*	1	*	*	*	
Belper	*	*	*	*	1	1	1	1	1	*	*	*	
Bere Alston	2	*	*	*	*	*	*	*	*	*	*	*	
Berkshire	2	3	3	*	*	*	*	*	*	*	*	*	
East Berkshire	*	*	*	*	*	*	*	*	*	1	*	*	
Bermondsey	*	*	*	*	*	*	1	1	*	*	*	*	
Bermondsey and Old Southwark	*	*	*	*	*	*	*	*	*	*	*	1	
Bermondsey, Rotherhithe	*	*	*	*	1	1	*	*	*	*	*	*	
West Bermondsey	*	*	*	*	1	1	*	*	*	*	*	*	
Berwick upon Tweed	*	*	*	*	*	*	1	1	1	*	*	*	
Berwick-upon-Tweed	2	2	2	1	1	1	*	*	*	1	1	1	
Bethnal Green	*	*	*	*	*	*	1	1	*	*	*	*	
Bethnal Green and Bow	*	*	*	*	*	*	*	*	*	*	1	1	
Bethnal Green and Stepney	*	*	*	*	*	*	*	*	*	1	*	*	
Bethnal Green North East	*	*	*	*	1	1	*	*	*	*	*	*	
Bethnal Green North-East	*	*	*	1	*	*	*	*	*	*	*	*	
Bethnal Green South West	*	*	*	*	1	1	*	*	*	*	*	*	
Bethnal Green South-West	*	*	*	1	*	*	*	*	*	*	*	*	
Beverley	2	2	(2)	*	*	*	1	*	*	1	*	*	Disfranchised 1870
Beverley and Holderness	*	*	*	*	*	*	*	*	*	*	1	1	
Bewdley	1	1	1	1	1	1	*	*	*	*	*	*	
Bexhill and Battle	*	*	*	*	*	*	*	*	*	1	1	1	
Bexley	*	*	*	*	*	1	1	1	*	*	*	*	
Bexley, Bexleyheath	*	*	*	*	*	*	*	*	1	*	*	*	
Bexley, Erith and Crayford	*	*	*	*	*	*	*	*	1	*	*	*	
Bexley, Sidcup	*	*	*	*	*	*	*	*	1	*	*	*	
Bexleyheath	*	*	*	*	*	*	*	*	*	1	*	*	
Bexleyheath and Crayford	*	*	*	*	*	*	*	*	*	*	1	1	
Biggleswade	*	*	*	1	*	*	*	*	*	*	*	*	
Billericay	*	*	*	*	*	*	1	1	*	1	1	*	
Bilston	*	*	*	*	*	*	1	1	*	*	*	*	
Birkenhead	*	(1)	1	1	*	*	1	1	1	1	1	1	Enfranchised 1861
Birkenhead East	*	*	*	*	1	1	*	*	*	*	*	*	
Birkenhead West	*	*	*	*	1	1	*	*	*	*	*	*	
Birmingham	*	2	3	*	*	*	*	*	*	*	*	*	
Birmingham, Acock's Green	*	*	*	*	*	1	*	*	*	*	*	*	
Birmingham, All Saints	*	*	*	*	*	*	*	1	*	*	*	*	
Birmingham, Aston	*	*	*	*	1	1	1	1	*	*	*	*	
Birmingham, Bordesley	*	*	*	1	*	*	*	*	*	*	*	*	
Birmingham Central	*	*	*	1	*	*	*	*	*	*	*	*	
Birmingham, Deritend	*	*	*	*	1	1	*	*	*	*	*	*	
Birmingham, Duddeston	*	*	*	*	1	1	*	*	*	*	*	*	
Birmingham East	*	*	*	1	*	*	*	*	*	*	*	*	
Birmingham, Edgbaston	*	*	*	1	1	1	1	1	1	1	1	1	
Birmingham, Erdington	*	*	*	*	1	1	1	*	1	1	1	1	
Birmingham, Hall Green	*	*	*	*	*	*	1	1	1	1	1	1	
Birmingham, Handsworth	*	*	*	*	1	1	1	1	1	*	*	*	
Birmingham, Hodge Hill	*	*	*	*	*	*	*	*	*	1	1	1	
Birmingham, King's Norton	*	*	*	*	1	1	1	*	*	*	*	*	
Birmingham, Ladywood	*	*	*	*	1	1	1	1	1	1	1	1	
Birmingham, Moseley	*	*	*	*	1	1	*	*	*	*	*	*	
Birmingham North	*	*	*	1	*	*	*	*	*	*	*	*	
Birmingham, Northfield	*	*	*	*	*	*	1	1	1	1	1	1	
Birmingham, Perry Barr	*	*	*	*	*	*	1	1	1	1	1	1	
Birmingham, Selly Oak	*	*	*	*	*	*	*	1	1	1	1	1	
Birmingham, Small Heath	*	*	*	*	*	*	1	1	1	1	*	*	
Birmingham South	*	*	*	1	*	*	*	*	*	*	*	*	
Birmingham, Sparkbrook	*	*	*	*	1	1	1	1	1	1	*	*	
Birmingham, Sparkbrook and Small Heath	*	*	*	*	*	*	*	*	*	*	1	*	
Birmingham, Stechford	*	*	*	*	*	*	1	1	1	*	*	*	
Birmingham West	*	*	*	1	*	*	*	*	*	*	*	*	
Birmingham, Yardley	*	*	*	*	1	1	1	1	1	1	1	1	
West Birmingham	*	*	*	*	1	1	*	*	*	*	*	*	
Bishop Auckland	*	*	*	1	1	1	1	1	1	1	1	1	
Bishops Castle	2	*	*	*	*	*	*	*	*	*	*	*	
Blaby	*	*	*	*	*	*	*	*	1	1	1	*	
Blackburn	*	2	2	2	2	2	*	1	1	1	1	1	
Blackburn East	*	*	*	*	*	*	1	*	*	*	*	*	
Blackburn West	*	*	*	*	*	*	1	*	*	*	*	*	
Blackley and Broughton	*	*	*	*	*	*	*	*	*	*	*	1	
Blackpool	*	*	*	1	1	*	*	*	*	*	*	*	
Blackpool North	*	*	*	*	*	1	1	1	1	1	*	*	
Blackpool North and Cleveleys	*	*	*	*	*	*	*	*	*	*	*	1	
Blackpool North and Fleetwood	*	*	*	*	*	*	*	*	*	*	1	*	
Blackpool South	*	*	*	*	*	1	1	1	1	1	1	1	
Blaydon	*	*	*	*	1	1	1	1	1	1	1	1	
Bletchingley	2	*	*	*	*	*	*	*	*	*	*	*	
Blyth	*	*	*	*	*	*	1	1	1	*	*	*	
Blyth Valley	*	*	*	*	*	*	*	*	*	1	1	1	
Bodmin	2	2	1	1	1	1	1	1	1	*	*	*	
Bognor Regis and Littlehampton	*	*	*	*	*	*	*	*	*	*	1	1	
Bolsover	*	*	*	*	*	*	1	1	1	1	1	1	
Bolton	*	2	2	2	2	2	*	*	*	*	*	*	
Bolton East	*	*	*	*	*	*	1	1	1	*	*	*	
Bolton North East	*	*	*	*	*	*	*	*	*	1	1	1	
Bolton South East	*	*	*	*	*	*	*	*	*	1	1	1	
Bolton West	*	*	*	*	*	*	1	1	1	1	1	1	
Boothferry	*	*	*	*	*	*	*	*	*	1	*	*	
Bootle	*	*	*	1	1	1	1	1	1	1	1	1	
Boroughbridge	2	*	*	*	*	*	*	*	*	*	*	*	
Bossiney	2	*	*	*	*	*	*	*	*	*	*	*	
Boston	2	2	2	1	*	*	*	*	*	*	*	*	
Boston and Skegness	*	*	*	*	*	*	*	*	*	*	1	1	
Bosworth	*	*	*	1	1	1	1	1	1	1	1	1	
Bournemouth	*	*	*	*	1	1	*	*	*	*	*	*	
Bournemouth East	*	*	*	*	*	*	*	*	1	1	1	1	
Bournemouth East and Christchurch	*	*	*	*	*	*	1	1	*	*	*	*	
Bournemouth West	*	*	*	*	*	*	1	1	1	1	1	1	
Bow and Poplar	*	*	*	*	*	*	*	*	*	1	*	*	
Brackley	2	*	*	*	*	*	*	*	*	*	*	*	
Bracknell	*	*	*	*	*	*	*	*	*	*	1	1	
Bradford	*	2	2	*	*	*	*	*	*	*	*	*	
Bradford Central	*	*	*	1	1	1	1	*	*	*	*	*	
Bradford East	*	*	*	1	1	1	1	1	*	*	*	1	
Bradford North	*	*	*	*	1	1	1	1	1	1	1	*	
Bradford South	*	*	*	*	1	1	1	1	1	1	1	1	
Bradford West	*	*	*	1	*	*	*	1	1	1	1	1	
Braintree	*	*	*	*	*	*	*	*	1	1	1	1	
Bramber	2	*	*	*	*	*	*	*	*	*	*	*	
Brent Central	*	*	*	*	*	*	*	*	*	*	*	1	
Brent East	*	*	*	*	*	*	*	*	1	1	1	*	
Brent North	*	*	*	*	*	*	*	*	1	1	1	1	
Brent South	*	*	*	*	*	*	*	*	1	1	1	*	
Brentford	*	*	*	1	*	*	*	*	*	*	*	*	
Brentford and Chiswick	*	*	*	*	1	1	1	1	*	*	*	*	
Brentford and Isleworth	*	*	*	*	*	*	*	*	*	1	1	1	
Brentwood and Ongar	*	*	*	*	*	*	*	*	1	1	1	1	
Bridgnorth	2	2	1	*	*	*	*	*	*	*	*	*	
Bridgwater	2	2	(2)	1	1	1	1	1	1	1	1	*	Disfranchised 1870
Bridgwater and West Somerset	*	*	*	*	*	*	*	*	*	*	*	1	
Bridlington	*	*	*	*	*	*	1	1	1	1	*	*	
Bridport	2	2	1	*	*	*	*	*	*	*	*	*	
Brierley Hill	*	*	*	*	*	*	1	1	*	*	*	*	
Brigg	*	*	*	1	1	1	1	1	*	*	*	*	
Brigg and Cleethorpes	*	*	*	*	*	*	*	*	*	1	*	*	
Brigg and Goole	*	*	*	*	*	*	*	*	*	*	1	1	
Brigg and Scunthorpe	*	*	*	*	*	*	*	*	1	*	*	*	
Brighouse and Spenborough	*	*	*	*	*	*	1	1	1	*	*	*	
Brighton	*	2	2	2	2	2	*	*	*	*	*	*	
Brighton, Kemptown	*	*	*	*	*	*	1	1	1	1	1	1	
Brighton, Pavilion	*	*	*	*	*	*	1	1	1	1	1	1	
Bristol	2	2	2	*	*	*	*	*	*	*	*	*	
Bristol Central	*	*	*	*	1	1	1	1	*	*	*	*	
Bristol East	*	*	*	1	1	1	*	*	*	1	1	1	
Bristol North	*	*	*	1	1	1	*	*	*	*	*	*	
Bristol North East	*	*	*	*	*	*	1	1	1	*	*	*	
Bristol North West	*	*	*	*	*	*	1	1	1	1	1	1	
Bristol South	*	*	*	1	1	1	1	1	1	1	1	1	
Bristol South East	*	*	*	*	*	*	1	1	1	*	*	*	
Bristol West	*	*	*	1	1	1	1	1	1	1	1	1	
Broadland	*	*	*	*	*	*	*	*	*	*	*	1	
Bromley	*	*	*	*	1	1	1	1	*	*	*	*	
Bromley and Chislehurst	*	*	*	*	*	*	*	*	*	*	1	1	
Bromley, Beckenham	*	*	*	*	*	*	*	*	1	*	*	*	
Bromley, Chislehurst	*	*	*	*	*	*	*	*	1	*	*	*	
Bromley, Orpington	*	*	*	*	*	*	*	*	1	*	*	*	
Bromley, Ravensbourne	*	*	*	*	*	*	*	*	1	*	*	*	
Bromsgrove	*	*	*	*	*	*	1	1	*	1	1	1	
Bromsgrove and Redditch	*	*	*	*	*	*	*	*	1	*	*	*	
Broxbourne	*	*	*	*	*	*	*	*	*	1	1	1	
Broxtowe	*	*	*	*	1	1	1	*	*	1	1	1	
Buckingham	2	2	1	1	1	1	1	1	1	1	1	1	
Buckinghamshire	2	3	3	*	*	*	*	*	*	*	*	*	
South Buckinghamshire	*	*	*	*	*	*	1	1	*	*	*	*	
Bucklow	*	*	*	*	*	1	*	*	*	*	*	*	
Buckrose	*	*	*	1	1	1	*	*	*	*	*	*	
Burnley	*	*	1	1	1	1	1	1	1	1	1	1	
Burton	*	*	*	1	1	1	1	1	1	1	1	1	
Bury	*	1	1	1	1	1	*	*	*	*	*	*	
Bury and Radcliffe	*	*	*	*	*	*	1	1	1	*	*	*	
Bury North	*	*	*	*	*	*	*	*	*	1	1	1	
Bury South	*	*	*	*	*	*	*	*	*	1	1	1	
Bury St. Edmunds	2	2	2	1	1	1	1	1	1	1	1	*	
Bury St Edmunds	*	*	*	*	*	*	*	*	*	*	*	1	

== C ==
Constituency	1707	1832	1868	1885	1918	1945	1950	1955	1974	1983	1997	2010	Note
Calder Valley	*	*	*	*	*	*	*	*	*	1	1	1	
Callington	2	*	*	*	*	*	*	*	*	*	*	*	
Calne	2	1	1	*	*	*	*	*	*	*	*	*	
Camberwell and Peckham	*	*	*	*	*	*	*	*	*	*	1	1	
Camberwell, Dulwich	*	*	*	1	1	1	1	1	*	*	*	*	See Dulwich
Camberwell North	*	*	*	1	1	1	*	*	*	*	*	*	
Camberwell North West	*	*	*	*	1	1	*	*	*	*	*	*	
Camberwell, Peckham	*	*	*	1	1	1	1	1	*	*	*	*	See Peckham
Camborne	*	*	*	1	1	1	*	*	*	*	*	*	
Camborne and Redruth	*	*	*	*	*	*	*	*	*	*	*	1	
Cambridge	2	2	2	1	1	1	1	1	1	1	1	1	
County of Cambridge	*	*	*	*	1	1	*	*	*	*	*	*	Unofficial prefix
Cambridge University	2	2	2	2	*	*	*	*	*	*	*	*	
The University of Cambridge	*	*	*	*	2	2	*	*	*	*	*	*	
Cambridgeshire	2	3	3	*	*	*	1	1	1	*	*	*	
North East Cambridgeshire	*	*	*	*	*	*	*	*	*	1	1	1	
North West Cambridgeshire	*	*	*	*	*	*	*	*	*	*	1	1	
South Cambridgeshire	*	*	*	*	*	*	*	*	*	*	1	1	
South East Cambridgeshire	*	*	*	*	*	*	*	*	*	1	1	1	
South West Cambridgeshire	*	*	*	*	*	*	*	*	*	1	*	*	
Camden, Hampstead	*	*	*	*	*	*	*	*	1	*	*	*	
Camden, Holborn and St. Pancras South	*	*	*	*	*	*	*	*	1	*	*	*	
Camden, St. Pancras North	*	*	*	*	*	*	*	*	1	*	*	*	
Camelford	2	*	*	*	*	*	*	*	*	*	*	*	
Cannock	*	*	*	*	1	1	1	1	1	*	*	*	
Cannock and Burntwood	*	*	*	*	*	*	*	*	*	1	*	*	
Cannock Chase	*	*	*	*	*	*	*	*	*	*	1	1	
Canterbury	2	2	2	1	1	1	1	1	1	1	1	1	
Carlisle	2	2	2	1	1	1	1	1	1	1	1	1	
Carlton	*	*	*	*	*	*	1	1	1	*	*	*	
Carshalton	*	*	*	*	*	1	1	1	1	*	*	*	
Carshalton and Wallington	*	*	*	*	*	*	*	*	*	1	1	1	
Castle Point	*	*	*	*	*	*	*	*	*	1	1	1	
Castle Rising	2	*	*	*	*	*	*	*	*	*	*	*	
Charnwood	*	*	*	*	*	*	*	*	*	*	1	1	
Chatham	*	1	1	1	*	*	*	*	*	*	*	*	
Chatham and Aylesford	*	*	*	*	*	*	*	*	*	*	1	1	
Cheadle	*	*	*	*	*	*	1	1	1	1	1	1	
Chelmsford	*	*	*	1	1	1	1	1	1	1	*	1	
West Chelmsford	*	*	*	*	*	*	*	*	*	*	1	*	
Chelsea	*	*	2	1	1	1	1	1	*	1	*	*	
Chelsea and Fulham	*	*	*	*	*	*	*	*	*	*	*	1	
Cheltenham	*	1	1	1	1	1	1	1	1	1	1	1	
Chertsey	*	*	*	1	1	1	1	1	*	*	*	*	
Chertsey and Walton	*	*	*	*	*	*	*	*	1	1	*	*	
Chesham and Amersham	*	*	*	*	*	*	*	*	1	1	1	1	
Cheshire	2	*	*	*	*	*	*	*	*	*	*	*	
Eastern Cheshire	*	*	2	*	*	*	*	*	*	*	*	*	
Mid Cheshire	*	*	2	*	*	*	*	*	*	*	*	*	
Northern Cheshire	*	2	*	*	*	*	*	*	*	*	*	*	
Southern Cheshire	*	2	*	*	*	*	*	*	*	*	*	*	
Western Cheshire	*	*	2	*	*	*	*	*	*	*	*	*	
City of Chester	2	2	2	1	*	*	*	*	*	*	*	*	Unofficial prefix
City of Chester	*	*	*	*	1	1	1	1	1	1	1	1	Official prefix
Chesterfield	*	*	*	1	1	1	1	1	1	1	1	1	
Chester-le-Street	*	*	*	1	1	1	1	1	1	*	*	*	
Chesterton	*	*	*	1	*	*	*	*	*	*	*	*	
Chichester	2	2	1	1	1	1	1	1	1	1	1	1	
Chigwell	*	*	*	*	*	*	*	1	*	*	*	*	
Chingford	*	*	*	*	*	*	*	*	1	1	*	*	
Chingford and Woodford Green	*	*	*	*	*	*	*	*	*	*	1	1	
Chippenham	2	2	1	1	1	1	1	1	1	*	*	1	
Chipping Barnet	*	*	*	*	*	*	*	*	*	1	1	*	See Barnet
Chipping Wycombe	2	2	1	*	*	*	*	*	*	*	*	*	See Wycombe
Chislehurst	*	*	*	*	1	1	1	1	*	1	*	*	
Chorley	*	*	*	1	1	1	1	1	1	1	1	1	
Christchurch	2	1	1	1	*	*	*	*	*	1	1	1	
Christchurch and Lymington	*	*	*	*	*	*	*	*	1	*	*	*	
Cirencester	2	2	1	1	*	*	*	*	*	*	*	*	
Cirencester and Tewkesbury	*	*	*	*	1	1	1	1	1	1	*	*	
Clacton	*	*	*	*	*	*	*	*	*	*	*	1	
Clay Cross	*	*	*	*	1	1	*	*	*	*	*	*	
Cleethorpes	*	*	*	*	*	*	*	*	*	*	1	1	
Cleveland	*	*	*	1	1	1	1	1	*	*	*	*	
Cleveland and Whitby	*	*	*	*	*	*	*	*	1	*	*	*	
Clitheroe	2	1	1	1	1	1	1	1	1	*	*	*	
Cockermouth	2	2	1	1	*	*	*	*	*	*	*	*	
Colchester	2	2	2	1	1	1	1	1	1	*	1	1	
North Colchester	*	*	*	*	*	*	*	*	*	1	*	*	
South Colchester and Maldon	*	*	*	*	*	*	*	*	*	1	*	*	
Colne Valley	*	*	*	1	1	1	1	1	1	1	1	1	
Combined English Universities	*	*	*	*	2	2	*	*	*	*	*	*	Unofficial name
Congleton	*	*	*	*	*	*	*	*	*	1	1	1	
Consett	*	*	*	*	1	1	1	1	1	*	*	*	
Copeland	*	*	*	*	*	*	*	*	*	1	1	1	
Corby	*	*	*	*	*	*	*	*	*	1	1	1	
Corfe Castle	2	*	*	*	*	*	*	*	*	*	*	*	
Cornwall	2	*	*	*	*	*	*	*	*	*	*	*	
Eastern Cornwall	*	2	2	*	*	*	*	*	*	*	*	*	
North Cornwall	*	*	*	*	*	*	1	1	1	1	1	1	
Northern Cornwall	*	*	*	*	1	1	*	*	*	*	*	*	
South East Cornwall	*	*	*	*	*	*	*	*	*	1	1	1	
Western Cornwall	*	2	2	*	*	*	*	*	*	*	*	*	
Cotswold	*	*	*	*	*	*	*	*	*	*	1	*	
The Cotswolds	*	*	*	*	*	*	*	*	*	*	*	1	
Coventry	2	2	2	1	1	*	*	*	*	*	*	*	
Coventry East	*	*	*	*	*	1	1	1	*	*	*	*	
Coventry North	*	*	*	*	*	*	1	1	*	*	*	*	
Coventry North East	*	*	*	*	*	*	*	*	1	1	1	1	
Coventry North West	*	*	*	*	*	*	*	*	1	1	1	1	
Coventry South	*	*	*	*	*	*	1	1	*	*	1	1	
Coventry South East	*	*	*	*	*	*	*	*	1	1	*	*	
Coventry South West	*	*	*	*	*	*	*	*	1	1	*	*	
Coventry West	*	*	*	*	*	1	*	*	*	*	*	*	
Crawley	*	*	*	*	*	*	*	*	*	1	1	1	
Crewe	*	*	*	1	1	1	1	1	1	*	*	*	
Crewe and Nantwich	*	*	*	*	*	*	*	*	*	1	1	1	
Cricklade	2	2	1	1	*	*	*	*	*	*	*	*	
Crosby	*	*	*	*	*	*	1	1	1	1	1	*	
Croydon	*	*	*	1	*	*	*	*	*	*	*	*	
Croydon Central	*	*	*	*	*	*	*	*	1	1	1	1	
Croydon East	*	*	*	*	*	*	1	*	*	*	*	*	
Croydon North	*	*	*	*	1	1	1	*	*	*	1	1	
Croydon North East	*	*	*	*	*	*	*	1	1	1	*	*	
Croydon North West	*	*	*	*	*	*	*	1	1	1	*	*	
Croydon South	*	*	*	*	1	1	*	1	1	1	1	1	
Croydon West	*	*	*	*	*	*	1	*	*	*	*	*	
Cumberland	2	*	*	*	*	*	*	*	*	*	*	*	
Eastern Cumberland	*	2	2	*	*	*	*	*	*	*	*	*	
Northern Cumberland	*	*	*	*	1	1	*	*	*	*	*	*	
Western Cumberland	*	2	2	*	*	*	*	*	*	*	*	*	

== D ==
Constituency	1707	1832	1868	1885	1918	1945	1950	1955	1974	1983	1997	2010	Note
Dagenham	*	*	*	*	*	1	1	1	*	1	1	*	
Dagenham and Rainham	*	*	*	*	*	*	*	*	*	*	*	1	
Darlington	*	*	1	1	1	1	1	1	1	1	1	1	
Dartford	*	*	*	1	1	1	1	1	1	1	1	1	
Dartmouth	2	1	*	*	*	*	*	*	*	*	*	*	
Darwen	*	*	*	1	1	1	1	1	1	*	*	*	
Daventry	*	*	*	*	1	1	*	*	1	1	1	1	
Davyhulme	*	*	*	*	*	*	*	*	*	1	*	*	
Dearne Valley	*	*	*	*	*	*	1	1	1	*	*	*	
Denton and Reddish	*	*	*	*	*	*	*	*	*	1	1	1	
Deptford	*	*	*	1	1	1	1	1	*	*	*	*	
Derby	2	2	2	2	2	2	*	*	*	*	*	*	
Derby North	*	*	*	*	*	*	1	1	1	1	1	1	
Derby South	*	*	*	*	*	*	1	1	1	1	1	1	
North Eastern Derby	*	*	*	*	1	1	*	*	*	*	*	*	See North East Derbyshire
Southern Derby	*	*	*	*	1	1	*	*	*	*	*	*	See South Derbyshire
Western Derby	*	*	*	*	1	1	*	*	*	*	*	*	See West Derbyshire
Derbyshire	2	*	*	*	*	*	*	*	*	*	*	*	
Derbyshire Dales	*	*	*	*	*	*	*	*	*	*	*	1	
Eastern Derbyshire	*	*	2	*	*	*	*	*	*	*	*	*	Art. East Derbyshire
Mid Derbyshire	*	*	*	1	*	*	*	*	*	*	*	1	
Northern Derbyshire	*	2	2	*	*	*	*	*	*	*	*	*	Art. North Derbyshire
North East Derbyshire	*	*	*	*	*	*	1	1	1	1	1	1	
North-Eastern Derbyshire	*	*	*	1	*	*	*	*	*	*	*	*	See North East Derbyshire
South Derbyshire	*	*	*	*	*	*	*	*	*	1	1	1	
Southern Derbyshire	*	2	2	1	*	*	*	*	*	*	*	*	See South Derbyshire
South East Derbyshire	*	*	*	*	*	*	1	1	1	*	*	*	
West Derbyshire	*	*	*	*	*	*	1	1	1	1	1	*	
Western Derbyshire	*	*	*	1	*	*	*	*	*	*	*	*	See West Derbyshire
Devizes	2	2	1	1	1	1	1	1	1	1	1	1	
Central Devon	*	*	*	*	*	*	*	*	*	*	*	1	
Devon	2	*	*	*	*	*	*	*	*	*	*	*	
East Devon	*	*	*	*	*	*	*	*	*	*	1	1	
Eastern Devon	*	*	2	*	*	*	*	*	*	*	*	*	See East Devon
North Devon	*	*	*	*	*	*	1	1	1	1	1	1	
Northern Devon	*	2	2	*	*	*	*	*	*	*	*	*	See North Devon
Southern Devon	*	2	2	*	*	*	*	*	*	*	*	*	Art. South Devon
South West Devon	*	*	*	*	*	*	*	*	*	*	1	1	
West Devon	*	*	*	*	*	*	*	*	1	*	*	*	
Devonport	*	2	2	2	*	*	*	*	*	*	*	*	See Plymouth, Devonport
Dewsbury	*	*	1	1	1	1	1	1	1	1	1	*	
Don Valley	*	*	*	*	1	1	1	1	1	1	1	1	
Doncaster	*	*	*	1	1	1	1	1	1	*	*	*	
Doncaster Central	*	*	*	*	*	*	*	*	*	1	1	1	
Doncaster North	*	*	*	*	*	*	*	*	*	1	1	1	
Dorchester	2	2	1	*	*	*	*	*	*	*	*	*	
Dorking	*	*	*	*	*	*	1	1	1	*	*	*	
Dorset	2	3	3	*	*	*	*	*	*	*	*	*	
Eastern Dorset	*	*	*	1	1	1	*	*	*	*	*	*	Art. East Dorset
Mid Dorset and North Poole	*	*	*	*	*	*	*	*	*	*	1	1	
North Dorset	*	*	*	*	*	*	1	1	1	1	1	1	
Northern Dorset	*	*	*	1	1	1	*	*	*	*	*	*	See North Dorset
South Dorset	*	*	*	*	*	*	1	1	1	1	1	1	
Southern Dorset	*	*	*	1	1	1	*	*	*	*	*	*	See South Dorset
West Dorset	*	*	*	*	*	*	1	1	1	1	1	1	
Western Dorset	*	*	*	1	1	1	*	*	*	*	*	*	See West Dorset
Dover	2	2	2	1	1	1	1	1	*	1	1	1	
Dover and Deal	*	*	*	*	*	*	*	*	1	*	*	*	See Dover
Downton	2	*	*	*	*	*	*	*	*	*	*	*	
Droitwich	2	1	1	1	*	*	*	*	*	*	*	*	
Droylsden	*	*	*	*	*	*	1	*	*	*	*	*	
Dudley	*	1	1	1	1	1	1	1	*	*	*	*	
Dudley East	*	*	*	*	*	*	*	*	1	1	*	*	
Dudley North	*	*	*	*	*	*	*	*	*	*	1	1	
Dudley South	*	*	*	*	*	*	*	*	*	*	1	1	
Dudley West	*	*	*	*	*	*	*	*	1	1	*	*	
Dulwich	*	*	*	*	*	*	*	*	*	1	*	*	
Dulwich and West Norwood	*	*	*	*	*	*	*	*	*	*	1	1	
Dunwich	2	*	*	*	*	*	*	*	*	*	*	*	
City of Durham	2	2	2	1	1	1	1	1	1	*	*	*	Unofficial prefix
City of Durham	*	*	*	*	*	*	*	*	*	1	1	1	Official prefix
County Durham	2	*	*	*	*	*	*	*	*	*	*	*	Unofficial prefix
Mid Durham	*	*	*	1	*	*	*	*	*	*	*	*	
North Durham	*	*	*	*	*	*	*	*	*	1	1	1	
Northern Durham	*	2	2	*	*	*	*	*	*	*	*	*	See North Durham
North West Durham	*	*	*	*	*	*	1	1	1	1	1	1	
North Western Durham	*	*	*	1	*	*	*	*	*	*	*	*	See North West Durham
Southern Durham	*	2	2	*	*	*	*	*	*	*	*	*	Art. South Durham
South Eastern Durham	*	*	*	1	*	*	*	*	*	*	*	*	Art. South East Durham

== E ==
Constituency	1707	1832	1868	1885	1918	1945	1950	1955	1974	1983	1997	2010	Note
Ealing	*	*	*	1	1	*	*	*	*	*	*	*	
Ealing, Acton	*	*	*	*	*	*	*	*	1	1	*	*	
Ealing, Acton and Shepherd's Bush	*	*	*	*	*	*	*	*	*	*	1	*	
Ealing Central and Acton	*	*	*	*	*	*	*	*	*	*	*	1	
Ealing East	*	*	*	*	*	1	*	*	*	*	*	*	
Ealing North	*	*	*	*	*	*	1	1	1	1	1	*	
Ealing South	*	*	*	*	*	*	1	1	*	*	*	*	
Ealing, Southall	*	*	*	*	*	*	*	*	1	1	1	1	
Ealing West	*	*	*	*	*	1	*	*	*	*	*	*	
Easington	*	*	*	*	*	*	1	1	1	1	1	1	
Eastbourne	*	*	*	1	1	1	1	1	1	1	1	1	
East Grinstead	2	*	*	1	1	1	1	1	1	*	*	*	
East Ham	*	*	*	*	*	*	*	*	*	*	1	1	
East Ham North	*	*	*	*	1	1	1	1	*	*	*	*	
East Ham South	*	*	*	*	1	1	1	1	*	*	*	*	
Eastleigh	*	*	*	*	*	*	*	1	1	1	1	1	
East Looe	2	*	*	*	*	*	*	*	*	*	*	*	
East Retford	2	2	2	*	*	*	*	*	*	*	*	*	
Eccles	*	*	*	1	1	1	1	1	1	1	1	*	
Eddisbury	*	*	*	1	1	1	*	*	*	1	1	1	
Edmonton	*	*	*	*	1	1	1	1	*	1	1	1	
Egremont	*	*	*	1	*	*	*	*	*	*	*	*	
Elland	*	*	*	1	1	1	*	*	*	*	*	*	
Ellesmere Port and Neston	*	*	*	*	*	*	*	*	*	1	1	1	
Elmet	*	*	*	*	*	*	*	*	*	1	1	*	
Elmet and Rothwell	*	*	*	*	*	*	*	*	*	*	*	1	
Eltham	*	*	*	*	*	*	*	*	*	1	1	1	
Enfield	*	*	*	1	1	1	*	*	*	*	*	*	
Enfield East	*	*	*	*	*	*	1	1	*	*	*	*	
Enfield, Edmonton	*	*	*	*	*	*	*	*	1	*	*	*	See Edmonton
Enfield North	*	*	*	*	*	*	*	*	1	1	1	1	
Enfield, Southgate	*	*	*	*	*	*	*	*	1	1	1	1	
Enfield West	*	*	*	*	*	*	1	1	*	*	*	*	
Epping	*	*	*	1	1	1	1	1	*	*	*	*	
Epping Forest	*	*	*	*	*	*	*	*	1	1	1	1	
Epsom	*	*	*	1	1	1	1	1	*	*	*	*	See Epsom and Ewell
Epsom and Ewell	*	*	*	*	*	*	*	*	1	1	1	1	
Erewash	*	*	*	*	*	*	*	*	*	1	1	1	
Erith and Crayford	*	*	*	*	*	*	*	1	*	1	*	*	
Erith and Thamesmead	*	*	*	*	*	*	*	*	*	*	1	1	
Esher	*	*	*	*	*	*	1	1	1	1	*	*	See Esher and Walton
Esher and Walton	*	*	*	*	*	*	*	*	*	*	1	1	
Eskdale	*	*	*	1	*	*	*	*	*	*	*	*	
Eastern Essex	*	*	2	*	*	*	*	*	*	*	*	*	Art. East Essex
Essex	2	*	*	*	*	*	*	*	*	*	*	*	
North Essex	*	*	*	*	*	*	*	*	*	*	1	*	
Northern Essex	*	2	*	*	*	*	*	*	*	*	*	*	North Essex historic
Southern Essex	*	2	2	*	*	*	*	*	*	*	*	*	Art. South Essex
South East Essex	*	*	*	*	*	*	*	1	1	*	*	*	
South-Eastern Essex	*	*	*	1	1	1	*	*	*	*	*	*	See South East Essex
Western Essex	*	*	2	*	*	*	*	*	*	*	*	*	Art. West Essex
Eton and Slough	*	*	*	*	*	1	1	1	1	*	*	*	
Evesham	2	2	1	1	1	1	*	*	*	*	*	*	
Exeter	2	2	2	1	1	1	1	1	1	1	1	1	
Eye	2	1	1	1	1	1	1	1	1	*	*	*	

== F ==
Constituency	1707	1832	1868	1885	1918	1945	1950	1955	1974	1983	1997	2010	Note
Falmouth and Camborne	*	*	*	*	*	*	1	1	1	1	1	*	
Fareham	*	*	*	1	1	1	*	*	1	1	1	1	
Farnham	*	*	*	*	1	1	1	1	1	*	*	*	
Farnworth	*	*	*	*	1	1	1	1	1	*	*	*	
Faversham	*	*	*	1	1	1	1	1	1	1	*	*	
Faversham and Mid Kent	*	*	*	*	*	*	*	*	*	*	1	1	
Feltham	*	*	*	*	*	*	*	1	*	*	*	*	
Feltham and Heston	*	*	*	*	*	*	*	*	*	1	1	1	
Filton and Bradley Stoke	*	*	*	*	*	*	*	*	*	*	*	1	
Finchley	*	*	*	*	1	1	1	1	*	1	*	*	
Finchley and Golders Green	*	*	*	*	*	*	*	*	*	*	1	*	
Finsbury	*	2	2	*	1	1	*	*	*	*	*	*	
Finsbury Central	*	*	*	1	*	*	*	*	*	*	*	*	
Finsbury East	*	*	*	1	*	*	*	*	*	*	*	*	
Finsbury, Holborn	*	*	*	1	*	*	*	*	*	*	*	*	See Holborn
Folkestone and Hythe	*	*	*	*	*	*	1	1	1	1	1	1	
Forest of Dean	*	*	*	1	1	1	*	*	*	*	1	1	
Fowey	2	*	*	*	*	*	*	*	*	*	*	*	
Frome	*	1	1	1	1	1	*	*	*	*	*	*	
Fulham	*	*	*	1	*	*	*	1	*	1	*	*	
Fulham East	*	*	*	*	1	1	1	*	*	*	*	*	
Fulham West	*	*	*	*	1	1	1	*	*	*	*	*	
Fylde	*	*	*	*	1	1	*	*	*	1	1	1	
North Fylde	*	*	*	*	*	*	1	1	1	*	*	*	
South Fylde	*	*	*	*	*	*	1	1	1	*	*	*	

== G ==
Constituency	1707	1832	1868	1885	1918	1945	1950	1955	1974	1983	1997	2010	Note
Gainsborough	*	*	*	1	1	1	1	1	1	*	1	1	
Gainsborough and Horncastle	*	*	*	*	*	*	*	*	*	1	*	*	See Gainsborough
Garston and Halewood	*	*	*	*	*	*	*	*	*	*	*	1	
Gateshead	*	1	1	1	1	1	*	*	*	*	*	1	
Gateshead East	*	*	*	*	*	*	1	1	1	1	*	*	
Gateshead East and Washington West	*	*	*	*	*	*	*	*	*	*	1	*	
Gateshead West	*	*	*	*	*	*	1	1	1	*	*	*	
Gatton	2	*	*	*	*	*	*	*	*	*	*	*	
Gedling	*	*	*	*	*	*	*	*	*	1	1	1	
Gillingham	*	*	*	*	*	*	1	1	1	1	1	*	
Gillingham and Rainham	*	*	*	*	*	*	*	*	*	*	*	1	
Glanford and Scunthorpe	*	*	*	*	*	*	*	*	*	1	*	*	
Gloucester	2	2	2	1	1	1	1	1	1	1	1	1	
Eastern Gloucestershire	*	2	2	*	*	*	*	*	*	*	*	*	
Gloucestershire	2	*	*	*	*	*	*	*	*	*	*	*	
South Gloucestershire	*	*	*	*	*	*	1	1	1	*	*	*	
West Gloucestershire	*	*	*	*	*	*	1	1	1	1	*	*	
Western Gloucestershire	*	2	2	*	*	*	*	*	*	*	*	*	
Goole	*	*	*	*	*	*	1	1	1	*	*	*	
Gorton	*	*	*	1	*	*	*	*	*	*	*	*	See Manchester Gorton
Gosport	*	*	*	*	*	*	*	*	1	1	1	1	
Gosport and Fareham	*	*	*	*	*	*	1	1	*	*	*	*	
Grampound	(2)	*	*	*	*	*	*	*	*	*	*	*	Disfranchised 1821
Grantham	2	2	2	1	1	1	1	1	1	1	*	*	
Grantham and Stamford	*	*	*	*	*	*	*	*	*	*	1	1	
Gravesend	*	*	1	1	1	1	1	1	1	*	*	*	
Gravesham	*	*	*	*	*	*	*	*	*	1	1	1	
Great Bedwyn	2	*	*	*	*	*	*	*	*	*	*	*	
Great Grimsby	2	1	1	1	*	*	*	*	*	1	1	1	See Grimsby
Great Marlow	2	2	1	*	*	*	*	*	*	*	*	*	
Great Yarmouth	2	2	*	1	1	1	*	*	*	1	1	1	See Yarmouth (Norfolk)
Greenwich	*	2	2	1	1	1	1	1	1	1	*	*	
Greenwich and Woolwich	*	*	*	*	*	*	*	*	*	*	1	1	
Greenwich, Woolwich East	*	*	*	*	*	*	*	*	1	*	*	*	
Greenwich, Woolwich West	*	*	*	*	*	*	*	*	1	*	*	*	
Grimsby	*	*	*	*	1	1	1	1	1	*	*	*	See Great Grimsby
Guildford	2	2	1	1	1	1	1	1	1	1	1	1	

== H ==
Constituency	1707	1832	1868	1885	1918	1945	1950	1955	1974	1983	1997	2010	Note
Hackney	*	*	2	*	*	*	*	*	*	*	*	*	
Hackney Central	*	*	*	1	1	1	*	1	1	*	*	*	
Hackney North	*	*	*	1	1	1	*	*	*	*	*	*	
Hackney North and Stoke Newington	*	*	*	*	*	*	*	*	1	1	1	1	
Hackney South	*	*	*	1	1	1	1	*	*	*	*	*	
Hackney South and Shoreditch	*	*	*	*	*	*	*	*	1	1	1	1	
Halesowen and Rowley Regis	*	*	*	*	*	*	*	*	*	*	1	1	
Halesowen and Stourbridge	*	*	*	*	*	*	*	*	1	1	*	*	
Halifax	*	2	2	2	1	1	1	1	1	1	1	1	
Hallamshire	*	*	*	1	*	*	*	*	*	*	*	*	
Haltemprice	*	*	*	*	*	*	*	1	1	*	*	*	
Haltemprice and Howden	*	*	*	*	*	*	*	*	*	*	1	1	
Halton	*	*	*	*	*	*	*	*	*	1	1	1	
Hammersmith	*	*	*	1	*	*	*	*	*	1	*	1	
Hammersmith and Fulham	*	*	*	*	*	*	*	*	*	*	1	*	
Hammersmith, Fulham	*	*	*	*	*	*	*	*	1	*	*	*	See Fulham
Hammersmith North	*	*	*	*	1	1	1	1	1	*	*	*	
Hammersmith South	*	*	*	*	1	1	1	*	*	*	*	*	
East Hampshire	*	*	*	*	*	*	*	*	*	1	1	1	
Hampshire	2	*	*	*	*	*	*	*	*	*	*	*	
Northern Hampshire	*	2	2	*	*	*	*	*	*	*	*	*	
North East Hampshire	*	*	*	*	*	*	*	*	*	*	1	1	
North West Hampshire	*	*	*	*	*	*	*	*	*	1	1	1	
Southern Hampshire	*	2	2	*	*	*	*	*	*	*	*	*	
Hampstead	*	*	*	1	1	1	1	1	*	*	*	*	
Hampstead and Highgate	*	*	*	*	*	*	*	*	*	1	1	*	
Hampstead and Kilburn	*	*	*	*	*	*	*	*	*	*	*	1	
Handsworth	*	*	*	1	*	*	*	*	*	*	*	*	See Birmingham H.
Hanley	*	*	*	1	*	*	*	*	*	*	*	*	
Harborough	*	*	*	1	1	1	1	1	1	1	1	1	
Haringey, Hornsey	*	*	*	*	*	*	*	*	1	*	*	*	See Hornsey
Haringey, Tottenham	*	*	*	*	*	*	*	*	1	*	*	*	See Tottenham
Haringey, Wood Green	*	*	*	*	*	*	*	*	1	*	*	*	See Wood Green
Harlow	*	*	*	*	*	*	*	*	1	1	1	1	
Harrogate	*	*	*	*	*	*	1	1	1	1	*	*	See Harrogate and K.
Harrogate and Knaresborough	*	*	*	*	*	*	*	*	*	*	1	1	
Harrow	*	*	*	1	1	*	*	*	*	*	*	*	
Harrow Central	*	*	*	*	*	*	1	1	1	*	*	*	
Harrow East	*	*	*	*	*	1	1	1	1	1	1	1	
Harrow West	*	*	*	*	*	1	1	1	1	1	1	1	
Hartlepool	*	*	*	*	*	*	*	*	1	1	1	1	
The Hartlepools	*	*	1	1	1	1	1	1	*	*	*	*	See Hartlepool
Harwich	2	2	1	1	1	1	1	1	1	1	1	*	
Harwich and North Essex	*	*	*	*	*	*	*	*	*	*	*	1	
Haslemere	2	*	*	*	*	*	*	*	*	*	*	*	
Hastings	2	2	2	1	1	1	1	1	1	*	*	*	
Hastings and Rye	*	*	*	*	*	*	*	*	*	1	1	1	
Havant	*	*	*	*	*	*	*	*	*	1	1	1	
Havant and Waterloo	*	*	*	*	*	*	*	*	1	*	*	*	
Havering, Hornchurch	*	*	*	*	*	*	*	*	1	*	*	*	See Hornchurch
Havering, Romford	*	*	*	*	*	*	*	*	1	*	*	*	See Romford
Havering, Upminster	*	*	*	*	*	*	*	*	1	*	*	*	See Upminster
Hayes and Harlington	*	*	*	*	*	*	1	1	*	1	1	1	
Hazel Grove	*	*	*	*	*	*	*	*	1	1	1	1	
Hedon	2	*	*	*	*	*	*	*	*	*	*	*	
Helston	2	1	1	*	*	*	*	*	*	*	*	*	
Hemel Hempstead	*	*	*	*	1	1	1	1	1	*	1	1	
Hemsworth	*	*	*	*	1	1	1	1	1	1	1	1	
Hendon	*	*	*	*	1	*	*	*	*	*	1	*	
Hendon North	*	*	*	*	*	1	1	1	*	1	*	*	
Hendon South	*	*	*	*	*	1	1	1	*	1	*	*	
Henley	*	*	*	1	1	1	1	1	1	1	1	1	
Hereford	2	2	2	1	1	1	1	1	1	1	1	*	
Hereford and South Herefordshire	*	*	*	*	*	*	*	*	*	*	*	1	
Herefordshire	2	3	3	*	*	*	*	*	*	*	*	*	
North Herefordshire	*	*	*	*	*	*	*	*	*	*	*	1	
Hertford	2	2	1	1	1	1	1	1	*	*	*	*	
Hertford and Stevenage	*	*	*	*	*	*	*	*	1	*	*	*	See Hertford
Hertford and Stortford	*	*	*	*	*	*	*	*	*	1	1	1	
East Hertfordshire	*	*	*	*	*	*	*	1	1	*	*	*	
Hertfordshire	2	3	3	*	*	*	*	*	*	*	*	*	
North Hertfordshire	*	*	*	*	*	*	*	*	*	1	*	*	
North East Hertfordshire	*	*	*	*	*	*	*	*	*	*	1	1	
South Hertfordshire	*	*	*	*	*	*	*	*	1	*	*	*	
South West Hertfordshire	*	*	*	*	*	*	1	1	1	1	1	1	
West Hertfordshire	*	*	*	*	*	*	*	*	*	1	*	*	
Hertsmere	*	*	*	*	*	*	*	*	*	1	1	1	
Heston and Isleworth	*	*	*	*	*	1	1	1	*	*	*	*	
Hexham	*	*	*	1	1	1	1	1	1	1	1	1	
Heytesbury	2	*	*	*	*	*	*	*	*	*	*	*	
Heywood	*	*	*	1	*	*	*	*	*	*	*	*	
Heywood and Middleton	*	*	*	*	*	*	*	*	*	1	1	1	
Heywood and Radcliffe	*	*	*	*	1	1	*	*	*	*	*	*	
Heywood and Royton	*	*	*	*	*	*	1	1	1	*	*	*	
High Peak	*	*	*	1	1	1	1	1	1	1	1	1	
Higham Ferrers	1	*	*	*	*	*	*	*	*	*	*	*	
Hillingdon, Hayes and Harlington	*	*	*	*	*	*	*	*	1	*	*	*	See Hayes and Harlington
Hillingdon, Ruislip-Northwood	*	*	*	*	*	*	*	*	1	*	*	*	See Ruislip-Northwood
Hillingdon, Uxbridge	*	*	*	*	*	*	*	*	1	*	*	*	See Uxbridge
Hindon	2	*	*	*	*	*	*	*	*	*	*	*	
Hitchin	*	*	*	1	1	1	1	1	1	*	*	*	
Hitchin and Harpenden	*	*	*	*	*	*	*	*	*	*	1	1	
Holborn	*	*	*	*	1	1	*	*	*	*	*	*	
Holborn and St. Pancras	*	*	*	*	*	*	*	*	*	1	1	1	
Holborn and St. Pancras South	*	*	*	*	*	*	1	1	*	*	*	*	
Holderness	*	*	*	1	1	1	*	*	*	*	*	*	
Holland with Boston	*	*	*	*	1	1	1	1	1	1	*	*	
South Holland and The Deepings	*	*	*	*	*	*	*	*	*	*	1	1	
Holmfirth	*	*	*	1	*	*	*	*	*	*	*	*	
Honiton	2	2	*	1	1	1	1	1	1	1	*	*	
Horncastle	*	*	*	1	1	1	1	1	1	*	*	*	
Hornchurch	*	*	*	*	*	1	1	1	*	1	1	*	
Hornchurch and Upminster	*	*	*	*	*	*	*	*	*	*	*	1	
Hornsey	*	*	*	1	1	1	1	1	*	*	*	*	
Hornsey and Wood Green	*	*	*	*	*	*	*	*	*	1	1	1	
Horsham	2	1	1	1	*	1	1	1	*	1	1	1	
Horsham and Crawley	*	*	*	*	*	*	*	*	1	*	*	*	
Horsham and Worthing	*	*	*	*	1	*	*	*	*	*	*	*	
Houghton and Sunderland South	*	*	*	*	*	*	*	*	*	*	*	1	
Houghton and Washington	*	*	*	*	*	*	*	*	*	1	*	*	See Houghton & Wash. E.
Houghton and Washington East	*	*	*	*	*	*	*	*	*	*	1	*	
Houghton-le-Spring	*	*	*	1	1	1	1	1	1	*	*	*	
Hounslow, Brentford and Isleworth	*	*	*	*	*	*	*	*	1	*	*	*	See Brentford and Isleworth
Hounslow, Feltham and Heston	*	*	*	*	*	*	*	*	1	*	*	*	See Feltham and Heston
Hove	*	*	*	*	*	*	1	1	1	1	1	1	
Howden	*	*	*	*	*	*	*	1	1	*	*	*	
Howdenshire	*	*	*	1	1	1	*	*	*	*	*	*	
Huddersfield	*	1	1	1	1	1	*	*	*	1	1	1	
Huddersfield East	*	*	*	*	*	*	1	1	1	*	*	*	
Huddersfield West	*	*	*	*	*	*	1	1	1	*	*	*	
Huntingdon	2	2	1	1	*	*	*	*	*	1	1	1	
County of Huntingdon	*	*	*	*	1	1	*	*	*	*	*	*	See Huntingdonshire
Huntingdonshire	2	2	2	*	*	*	1	1	1	*	*	*	
Huyton	*	*	*	*	*	*	1	1	1	*	*	*	
Hyde	*	*	*	1	*	*	*	*	*	*	*	*	
Hyndburn	*	*	*	*	*	*	*	*	*	1	1	1	
Hythe	2	1	1	1	1	1	*	*	*	*	*	*	

== I ==
Constituency	1707	1832	1868	1885	1918	1945	1950	1955	1974	1983	1997	2010	Note
Ilchester	2	*	*	*	*	*	*	*	*	*	*	*	
Ilford	*	*	*	*	1	*	*	*	*	*	*	*	
Ilford North	*	*	*	*	*	1	1	1	*	1	1	1	
Ilford South	*	*	*	*	*	1	1	1	*	1	1	1	
Ilkeston	*	*	*	1	1	1	1	1	1	*	*	*	
Ince	*	*	*	1	1	1	1	1	1	*	*	*	
Ipswich	2	2	2	2	1	1	1	1	1	1	1	1	
Isle of Ely	*	*	*	*	1	1	*	*	1	*	*	*	
The Isle of Ely	*	*	*	*	*	*	1	1	*	*	*	*	
Isle of Thanet	*	*	*	1	1	1	1	1	*	*	*	*	
Isle of Wight	*	1	1	1	1	1	1	1	1	1	1	1	
Islington Central	*	*	*	*	*	*	*	*	1	*	*	*	
Islington East	*	*	*	1	1	1	1	1	*	*	*	*	
Islington North	*	*	*	1	1	1	1	1	1	1	1	1	
Islington South	*	*	*	1	1	1	*	*	*	*	*	*	
Islington South and Finsbury	*	*	*	*	*	*	*	*	1	1	1	1	
Islington South West	*	*	*	*	*	*	1	1	*	*	*	*	
Islington West	*	*	*	1	1	1	*	*	*	*	*	*	

== J ==
Constituency	1707	1832	1868	1885	1918	1945	1950	1955	1974	1983	1997	2010	Note
Jarrow	*	*	*	1	1	1	1	1	1	1	1	1	

== K ==
Constituency	1707	1832	1868	1885	1918	1945	1950	1955	1974	1983	1997	2010	Note
Keighley	*	*	*	1	1	1	1	1	1	1	1	1	
Kendal	*	1	1	1	*	*	*	*	*	*	*	*	
Kenilworth and Southam	*	*	*	*	*	*	*	*	*	*	*	1	
Kensington	*	*	*	*	*	*	*	*	*	1	*	1	
Kensington and Chelsea	*	*	*	*	*	*	*	*	*	*	1	*	
Kensington and Chelsea, Chelsea	*	*	*	*	*	*	*	*	1	*	*	*	
Kensington and Chelsea, Kensington	*	*	*	*	*	*	*	*	1	*	*	*	
Kensington North	*	*	*	1	1	1	1	1	*	*	*	*	
Kensington South	*	*	*	1	1	1	1	1	*	*	*	*	
Eastern Kent	*	2	2	*	*	*	*	*	*	*	*	*	
Kent	2	*	*	*	*	*	*	*	*	*	*	*	
Mid Kent	*	*	*	*	*	*	*	*	*	1	*	*	
Mid Kent	*	*	2	*	*	*	*	*	*	*	*	*	Mid Kent historic
Western Kent	*	2	2	*	*	*	*	*	*	*	*	*	
Parts of Kesteven and Holland	*	2	*	*	*	*	*	*	*	*	*	*	See South Lincolnshire
Kettering	*	*	*	*	1	1	1	1	1	1	1	1	
Kidderminster	*	1	1	1	1	1	1	1	1	*	*	*	
King's Lynn	2	2	2	1	1	1	1	1	*	*	*	*	
Kingston	*	*	*	1	*	*	*	*	*	*	*	*	See K. upon Thames
Kingston and Surbiton	*	*	*	*	*	*	*	*	*	*	1	1	
Kingston upon Hull	2	2	2	*	*	*	*	*	*	*	*	*	
Kingston upon Hull Central	*	*	*	1	1	1	1	*	1	*	*	*	
Kingston upon Hull East	*	*	*	1	1	1	1	1	1	1	1	1	
Kingston upon Hull Haltemprice	*	*	*	*	*	*	1	*	*	*	*	*	See Haltemprice
Kingston upon Hull North	*	*	*	*	*	*	1	1	*	1	1	1	
Kingston upon Hull North West	*	*	*	*	1	1	*	*	*	*	*	*	
Kingston upon Hull South West	*	*	*	*	1	1	*	*	*	*	*	*	
Kingston upon Hull West	*	*	*	1	*	*	*	1	1	1	*	*	
Kingston upon Hull West and Hessle	*	*	*	*	*	*	*	*	*	*	1	1	
Kingston upon Thames	*	*	*	*	*	*	*	1	1	1	*	*	
Kingston-upon-Thames	*	*	*	*	1	1	1	*	*	*	*	*	See K. upon Thames
Kingston upon Thames, Surbiton	*	*	*	*	*	*	*	*	1	*	*	*	See Surbiton
Kingswinford	*	*	*	1	1	1	*	*	*	*	*	*	
Kingswood	*	*	*	*	*	*	*	*	1	1	1	1	
Knaresborough	2	2	1	*	*	*	*	*	*	*	*	*	
Knowsley	*	*	*	*	*	*	*	*	*	*	*	1	
Knowsley North	*	*	*	*	*	*	*	*	*	1	*	*	
Knowsley North and Sefton East	*	*	*	*	*	*	*	*	*	*	1	*	
Knowsley South	*	*	*	*	*	*	*	*	*	1	1	*	
Knutsford	*	*	*	1	1	1	1	1	1	*	*	*	

== L ==
Constituency	1707	1832	1868	1885	1918	1945	1950	1955	1974	1983	1997	2010	Note
Lambeth	*	2	2	*	*	*	*	*	*	*	*	*	
Lambeth, Brixton	*	*	*	1	1	1	1	1	*	*	*	*	Art. Brixton
Lambeth Central	*	*	*	*	*	*	*	*	1	*	*	*	
Lambeth, Kennington	*	*	*	1	1	1	*	*	*	*	*	*	Art. Kennington
Lambeth North	*	*	*	1	1	1	*	*	*	*	*	*	
Lambeth, Norwood	*	*	*	1	1	1	1	1	1	*	*	*	See Norwood
Lambeth, Streatham	*	*	*	*	*	*	*	*	1	*	*	*	See Streatham
Lambeth, Vauxhall	*	*	*	*	*	*	1	1	1	*	*	*	See Vauxhall
Lancashire	2	*	*	*	*	*	*	*	*	*	*	*	
Northern Lancashire	*	2	2	*	*	*	*	*	*	*	*	*	
North Eastern Lancashire	*	*	2	*	*	*	*	*	*	*	*	*	
Southern Lancashire	*	2+	*	*	*	*	*	*	*	*	*	*	3 MPs from 1861
South Eastern Lancashire	*	*	2	*	*	*	*	*	*	*	*	*	
South Western Lancashire	*	*	2	*	*	*	*	*	*	*	*	*	
West Lancashire	*	*	*	*	*	*	*	*	*	1	1	1	
Lancaster	2	2	*	1	1	1	1	1	1	1	*	*	
Lancaster and Fleetwood	*	*	*	*	*	*	*	*	*	*	*	1	
Lancaster and Wyre	*	*	*	*	*	*	*	*	*	*	1	*	
Langbaurgh	*	*	*	*	*	*	*	*	*	1	*	*	
Launceston	2	1	1	1	*	*	*	*	*	*	*	*	
Leeds	*	2	3	*	*	*	*	*	*	*	*	*	
Leeds Central	*	*	*	1	1	1	1	*	*	1	1	1	
Leeds East	*	*	*	1	*	*	*	1	1	1	1	1	
Leeds North	*	*	*	1	1	1	1	*	*	*	*	*	
Leeds North East	*	*	*	*	*	*	*	1	1	1	1	1	
Leeds North-East	*	*	*	*	1	1	1	*	*	*	*	*	
Leeds North West	*	*	*	*	*	*	*	1	1	1	1	1	
Leeds North-West	*	*	*	*	*	*	1	*	*	*	*	*	
Leeds South	*	*	*	1	1	1	1	1	1	*	*	*	
Leeds South East	*	*	*	*	*	*	*	1	1	*	*	*	
Leeds South-East	*	*	*	*	1	1	1	*	*	*	*	*	
Leeds West	*	*	*	1	1	1	1	1	1	1	1	1	
Leek	*	*	*	1	1	1	1	1	1	*	*	*	
Leicester	2	2	2	2	*	*	*	*	*	*	*	*	
Leicester East	*	*	*	*	1	1	*	*	1	1	1	1	
Leicester North East	*	*	*	*	*	*	*	1	*	*	*	*	
Leicester North-East	*	*	*	*	*	*	1	*	*	*	*	*	
Leicester North West	*	*	*	*	*	*	*	1	*	*	*	*	
Leicester North-West	*	*	*	*	*	*	1	*	*	*	*	*	
Leicester South	*	*	*	*	1	1	*	*	1	1	1	1	
Leicester South East	*	*	*	*	*	*	*	1	*	*	*	*	
Leicester South-East	*	*	*	*	*	*	1	*	*	*	*	*	
Leicester South West	*	*	*	*	*	*	*	1	*	*	*	*	
Leicester South-West	*	*	*	*	*	*	1	*	*	*	*	*	
Leicester West	*	*	*	*	1	1	*	*	1	1	1	1	
Leicestershire	2	*	*	*	*	*	*	*	*	*	*	*	
Northern Leicestershire	*	2	2	*	*	*	*	*	*	*	*	*	
North West Leicestershire	*	*	*	*	*	*	*	*	*	1	1	1	
South Leicestershire	*	*	*	*	*	*	*	*	*	*	*	1	See Blaby
Southern Leicestershire (historic)	*	2	2	*	*	*	*	*	*	*	*	*	
Leigh	*	*	*	1	1	1	1	1	1	1	1	1	
Leominster	2	2	1	1	1	1	1	1	1	1	1	*	
Lewes	2	2	1	1	1	1	1	1	1	1	1	1	
Lewisham	*	*	*	1	*	*	*	*	*	*	*	*	
Lewisham, Deptford	*	*	*	*	*	*	*	*	1	1	1	1	
Lewisham East	*	*	*	*	1	1	*	*	1	1	1	1	
Lewisham North	*	*	*	*	*	*	1	1	*	*	*	*	
Lewisham South	*	*	*	*	*	*	1	1	*	*	*	*	
Lewisham West	*	*	*	*	1	1	1	1	1	1	1	*	
Lewisham West and Penge	*	*	*	*	*	*	*	*	*	*	*	1	
Leyton	*	*	*	*	*	*	1	1	*	1	*	*	
Leyton and Wanstead	*	*	*	*	*	*	*	*	*	*	1	1	
Leyton East	*	*	*	*	1	1	*	*	*	*	*	*	
Leyton West	*	*	*	*	1	1	*	*	*	*	*	*	
Lichfield	2	2	1	1	1	1	*	*	*	*	1	1	
Lichfield and Tamworth	*	*	*	*	*	*	1	1	1	*	*	*	
Lincoln	2	2	2	1	1	1	1	1	1	1	1	1	
Lincolnshire	2	*	*	*	*	*	*	*	*	*	*	*	
Mid Lincolnshire	*	*	2	*	*	*	*	*	*	*	*	*	
Northern Lincolnshire	*	*	2	*	*	*	*	*	*	*	*	*	
Southern Lincolnshire	*	*	2	*	*	*	*	*	*	*	*	*	
East Lindsey	*	*	*	*	*	*	*	*	*	1	*	*	
Parts of Lindsey	*	2	*	*	*	*	*	*	*	*	*	*	See North Lincs.
Liskeard	2	1	1	*	*	*	*	*	*	*	*	*	
Littleborough and Saddleworth	*	*	*	*	*	*	*	*	*	1	*	*	
Liverpool	2	2	3	*	*	*	*	*	*	*	*	*	
Liverpool, Abercromby	*	*	*	1	*	*	*	*	*	*	*	*	
Liverpool, Broadgreen	*	*	*	*	*	*	*	*	*	1	*	*	
Liverpool, East Toxteth	*	*	*	1	1	1	*	*	*	*	*	*	
Liverpool, Edge Hill	*	*	*	*	1	1	1	1	1	*	*	*	
Liverpool, Everton	*	*	*	1	1	1	*	*	*	*	*	*	
Liverpool, Exchange	*	*	*	1	1	1	1	1	*	*	*	*	
Liverpool, Fairfield	*	*	*	*	1	1	*	*	*	*	*	*	
Liverpool, Garston	*	*	*	*	*	*	1	1	1	1	1	*	
Liverpool, Kirkdale	*	*	*	1	1	1	1	1	1	*	*	*	
Liverpool, Mossley Hill	*	*	*	*	*	*	*	*	*	1	*	*	
Liverpool, Riverside	*	*	*	*	*	*	*	*	*	1	1	1	
Liverpool, Scotland	*	*	*	1	1	1	1	1	*	*	*	*	
Liverpool, Scotland Exchange	*	*	*	*	*	*	*	*	1	*	*	*	
Liverpool, Toxteth	*	*	*	*	*	*	1	1	1	*	*	*	
Liverpool, Walton	*	*	*	1	1	1	1	1	1	1	1	1	
Liverpool, Wavertree	*	*	*	*	1	1	1	1	1	*	1	1	
Liverpool, West Derby	*	*	*	1	1	1	1	1	1	1	1	1	
Liverpool, West Toxteth	*	*	*	1	1	1	*	*	*	*	*	*	
City of London	4	4	4	2	2	2	*	*	*	*	*	*	Official prefix
Cities of London and Westminster	*	*	*	*	*	*	*	1	*	*	1	1	Official prefix ^{a}
The Cities of London and Westminster	*	*	*	*	*	*	1	*	*	*	*	*	Official prefix ^{a}
The City of London and Westminster South	*	*	*	*	*	*	*	*	1	1	*	*	Official prefix ^{a}
London University	*	*	1	1	*	*	*	*	*	*	*	*	
The University of London	*	*	*	*	1	1	*	*	*	*	*	*	See London U.
Lonsdale	*	*	*	*	1	1	*	*	*	*	*	*	
North Lonsdale	*	*	*	1	*	*	*	*	*	*	*	*	
Lostwithiel	2	*	*	*	*	*	*	*	*	*	*	*	
Loughborough	*	*	*	1	1	1	1	1	1	1	1	1	
Louth (Lincolnshire)	*	*	*	1	1	1	1	1	1	*	*	*	Unofficial suffix
Louth and Horncastle	*	*	*	*	*	*	*	*	*	*	1	1	
Lowestoft	*	*	*	1	1	1	1	1	1	*	*	*	
Ludgershall	2	*	*	*	*	*	*	*	*	*	*	*	
Ludlow	2	2	1	1	1	1	1	1	1	1	1	1	
Luton	*	*	*	1	1	1	1	1	*	*	*	*	
Luton East	*	*	*	*	*	*	*	*	1	*	*	*	
Luton North	*	*	*	*	*	*	*	*	*	*	1	1	
Luton South	*	*	*	*	*	*	*	*	*	1	1	1	
Luton West	*	*	*	*	*	*	*	*	1	*	*	*	
North Luton	*	*	*	*	*	*	*	*	*	1	*	*	
Lyme Regis	2	1	*	*	*	*	*	*	*	*	*	*	
Lymington	2	2	1	*	*	*	*	*	*	*	*	*	

Note:-

- ^{a} All combined in one 'Cities of London and Westminster' article.

== M ==
Constituency	1707	1832	1868	1885	1918	1945	1950	1955	1974	1983	1997	2010	Note
Macclesfield	*	2	(2)	1	1	1	1	1	1	1	1	1	BC disfranchised 1885
Maidenhead	*	*	*	*	*	*	*	*	*	*	1	1	
Maidstone	2	2	2	1	1	1	1	1	1	1	*	*	See M. and The Weald
Maidstone and The Weald	*	*	*	*	*	*	*	*	*	*	1	1	
Makerfield	*	*	*	*	*	*	*	*	*	1	1	1	
Maldon	2	2	1	1	1	1	1	1	1	*	*	1	
Maldon and East Chelmsford	*	*	*	*	*	*	*	*	*	*	1	*	
Malmesbury	2	1	1	*	*	*	*	*	*	*	*	*	
Malton	2	2	1	*	*	*	*	*	*	*	*	*	
Manchester	*	2	3	*	*	*	*	*	*	*	*	*	
Manchester, Ardwick	*	*	*	*	1	1	1	1	1	*	*	*	
Manchester, Blackley	*	*	*	*	1	1	1	1	1	1	1	*	
Manchester Central	*	*	*	*	*	*	*	*	1	*	1	1	
Manchester, Central	*	*	*	*	*	*	*	*	*	1	*	*	
Manchester, Cheetham	*	*	*	*	*	*	1	1	*	*	*	*	
Manchester, Clayton	*	*	*	*	1	1	1	*	*	*	*	*	
Manchester East	*	*	*	1	*	*	*	*	*	*	*	*	
Manchester, Exchange	*	*	*	*	1	1	1	1	*	*	*	*	
Manchester, Gorton	*	*	*	*	1	1	1	1	1	1	1	1	
Manchester, Hulme	*	*	*	*	1	1	*	*	*	*	*	*	
Manchester, Moss Side	*	*	*	*	1	1	1	1	1	*	*	*	
Manchester North	*	*	*	1	*	*	*	*	*	*	*	*	
Manchester North-East	*	*	*	1	*	*	*	*	*	*	*	*	
Manchester North-West	*	*	*	1	*	*	*	*	*	*	*	*	
Manchester, Openshaw	*	*	*	*	*	*	*	1	1	*	*	*	
Manchester, Platting	*	*	*	*	1	1	*	*	*	*	*	*	
Manchester, Rusholme	*	*	*	*	1	1	*	*	*	*	*	*	
Manchester South	*	*	*	1	*	*	*	*	*	*	*	*	
Manchester South-West	*	*	*	1	*	*	*	*	*	*	*	*	
Manchester, Withington	*	*	*	*	1	1	1	1	1	1	1	1	
Manchester, Wythenshawe	*	*	*	*	*	*	1	1	1	1	*	*	
Mansfield	*	*	*	1	1	1	1	1	1	1	1	1	
Marlborough	2	2	1	*	*	*	*	*	*	*	*	*	
Marylebone	*	2	2	*	*	*	*	*	*	*	*	*	
Marylebone East	*	*	*	1	*	*	*	*	*	*	*	*	
Marylebone West	*	*	*	1	*	*	*	*	*	*	*	*	
Medway	*	*	*	1	*	*	*	*	*	1	1	*	
Melton	*	*	*	1	1	1	1	1	1	*	*	*	
Meon Valley	*	*	*	*	*	*	*	*	*	*	*	1	
Meriden	*	*	*	*	*	*	*	1	1	1	1	1	
Merton and Morden	*	*	*	*	*	*	1	1	*	*	*	*	
Merton, Mitcham and Morden	*	*	*	*	*	*	*	*	1	*	*	*	
Merton, Wimbledon	*	*	*	*	*	*	*	*	1	*	*	*	
Middlesbrough	*	*	1	1	*	*	*	*	*	1	1	1	
Middlesbrough East	*	*	*	*	1	1	1	1	*	*	*	*	
Middlesbrough South and East Cleveland	*	*	*	*	*	*	*	*	*	*	1	1	
Middlesbrough West	*	*	*	*	1	1	1	1	*	*	*	*	
Middlesex	2	2	2	*	*	*	*	*	*	*	*	*	
Middleton	*	*	*	1	*	*	*	*	*	*	*	*	
Middleton and Prestwich	*	*	*	*	1	1	1	1	1	*	*	*	
Midhurst	2	1	1	*	*	*	*	*	*	*	*	*	
Milborne Port	2	*	*	*	*	*	*	*	*	*	*	*	
Milton Keynes	*	*	*	*	*	*	*	*	*	(1)	*	*	Until 1992
Milton Keynes North	*	*	*	*	*	*	*	*	*	*	*	1	
Milton Keynes South	*	*	*	*	*	*	*	*	*	*	*	1	
Milton Keynes South West	*	*	*	*	*	*	*	*	*	(1)	1	*	From 1992
North East Milton Keynes	*	*	*	*	*	*	*	*	*	(1)	1	*	From 1992
Minehead	2	*	*	*	*	*	*	*	*	*	*	*	
Mitcham	*	*	*	*	1	1	1	1	*	*	*	*	
Mitcham and Morden	*	*	*	*	*	*	*	*	*	1	1	1	
Mitchell	2	*	*	*	*	*	*	*	*	*	*	*	
Mole Valley	*	*	*	*	*	*	*	*	*	1	1	1	
Morecambe and Lonsdale	*	*	*	*	*	*	1	1	1	*	*	*	
Morecambe and Lunesdale	*	*	*	*	*	*	*	*	*	1	1	1	
Morley	*	*	*	1	*	*	*	*	*	*	*	*	
Morley and Outwood	*	*	*	*	*	*	*	*	*	*	*	1	
Morley and Leeds South	*	*	*	*	*	*	*	*	*	1	*	*	
Morley and Rothwell	*	*	*	*	*	*	*	*	*	*	1	*	
Morpeth	2	1	1	1	1	1	1	1	1	*	*	*	
Mossley	*	*	*	*	1	1	*	*	*	*	*	*	

== Sources ==
From	Until	Statute/Statutory Instrument
1707	1832	Act of Union 1707
1832	1868	Reform Act 1832
1868	1885	Reform Act 1867
1885	1918	Redistribution of Seats Act 1885
1918	1950	Representation of the People Act 1918
1950	1955	Representation of the People Act 1948
1955	1974	various statutory instruments in 1955
1974	1983	The Parliamentary Constituencies (England) Order 1970
1983	1997	The Parliamentary Constituencies (England) Order 1983
1997	2010	The Parliamentary Constituencies (England) Order 1995

The 1945 redistribution affected only limited areas, with oversized constituencies (containing more than 100,000 voters). It was an interim measure before a general review by the Boundary Commission for England.
