= Official names of United Kingdom parliamentary constituencies in England N–Z =

An index of the constituency articles, showing which constituency names from this list they include, can be found at Wikipedia:Index of article on UK Parliament constituencies in England (for A-M) and Wikipedia:Index of articles on UK Parliament constituencies in England N-Z.

The official names of United Kingdom parliamentary constituencies in England (some of which originate from the names used for constituencies in predecessor Parliaments) are those given in the legal instrument creating the constituency or re-defining it at a re-distribution of seats.

The purpose of this article is to set out official names, taken from official sources wherever possible, to provide a definitive list which can then be used as a resource by those constructing constituency articles and other lists involving constituencies. It is requested that no amendments be made to the list, without a citation from a legal instrument creating the constituency, which has a greater validity than the source currently being used.

The names for the 1707 constituencies are, in general, taken from Namier and Brookes. The alternative forms for names, used in legislation abolishing some of the pre-1832 constituencies or in the case of Mitchell in common use as an alternative name, are included in the note column.

The list includes Greater London constituencies for 1974–1983 with the London Borough prefix as used in the official name. In practice articles have been done without the London Borough name. An example of the difficulty is the Acton constituency. The article which currently (December 2006) exists covers the period 1918–1983. There is a related article for Ealing Acton for the period from 1983. The official name for the constituency 1974-1983 was Ealing Acton but, in accordance with the practice adopted for other Greater London constituencies in the 1974 redistribution, the London Borough prefix was ignored. In the 1983 redistribution the London Borough name was dropped from most Greater London official constituency names, but retained for Ealing Acton.

== N ==
Constituency	1707	1832	1868	1885	1918	1945	1950	1955	1974	1983	1997	2010	Note
Nantwich	*	*	*	*	*	*	*	1	1	*	*	*	
Nelson and Colne	*	*	*	*	1	1	1	1	1	*	*	*	
Newark	2	2	2	1	1	1	1	1	1	1	1	1	
Newbury	*	*	*	1	1	1	1	1	1	1	1	1	
Newcastle under Lyme	*	*	*	*	*	*	1	1	*	*	*	*	See N-u-L
Newcastle-under-Lyme	2	2	2	1	1	1	*	*	1	1	1	1	
Newcastle-upon-Tyne	2	2	2	2	*	*	*	*	*	*	*	*	
Newcastle upon Tyne Central	*	*	*	*	*	*	1	1	1	1	1	1	
Newcastle-upon-Tyne Central	*	*	*	*	1	1	*	*	*	*	*	*	See N u T C
Newcastle upon Tyne East	*	*	*	*	*	*	1	1	1	1	*	1	
Newcastle-upon-Tyne East	*	*	*	*	1	1	*	*	*	*	*	*	See N u T E
Newcastle upon Tyne East and Wallsend	*	*	*	*	*	*	*	*	*	*	1	*	
Newcastle upon Tyne North	*	*	*	*	*	*	1	1	1	1	1	1	
Newcastle-upon-Tyne North	*	*	*	*	1	1	*	*	*	*	*	*	See N u T N
Newcastle upon Tyne West	*	*	*	*	*	*	1	1	1	*	*	*	
Newcastle-upon-Tyne West	*	*	*	*	1	1	*	*	*	*	*	*	See N u T W
New Forest	*	*	*	1	*	*	1	1	1	1	*	*	
New Forest and Christchurch	*	*	*	*	1	1	*	*	*	*	*	*	See New Forest
New Forest East	*	*	*	*	*	*	*	*	*	*	1	1	
New Forest West	*	*	*	*	*	*	*	*	*	*	1	1	
Newham North East	*	*	*	*	*	*	*	*	*	1	*	*	
Newham, North-East	*	*	*	*	*	*	*	*	1	*	*	*	
Newham North West	*	*	*	*	*	*	*	*	*	1	*	*	
Newham, North-West	*	*	*	*	*	*	*	*	1	*	*	*	
Newham South	*	*	*	*	*	*	*	*	1	1	*	*	
Newington, Walworth	*	*	*	1	*	*	*	*	*	*	*	*	
Newington West	*	*	*	1	*	*	*	*	*	*	*	*	
Newmarket	*	*	*	1	*	*	*	*	*	*	*	*	
Newport (Cornwall)	2	*	*	*	*	*	*	*	*	*	*	*	
Newport (Isle of Wight)	2	2	1	*	*	*	*	*	*	*	*	*	
Newport (Shropshire)	*	*	*	1	*	*	*	*	*	*	*	*	
New Romney	2	*	*	*	*	*	*	*	*	*	*	*	
New Shoreham	2	2	2	*	*	*	*	*	*	*	*	*	See Shoreham
Newton (Lancashire)	2	*	*	1	1	1	1	1	1	*	*	*	
Newton Abbot	*	*	*	*	*	*	*	*	*	*	*	1	
Newtown (Isle of Wight)	2	*	*	*	*	*	*	*	*	*	*	*	
New Windsor	2	2	1	*	*	*	*	*	*	*	*	*	See Windsor
New Woodstock	2	1	1	*	*	*	*	*	*	*	*	*	See Woodstock
Central Norfolk	*	*	*	*	*	*	1	1	*	*	*	*	
Eastern Norfolk	*	2	*	1	1	1	*	*	*	*	*	*	Art. East N.
Mid Norfolk	*	*	*	1	*	*	*	*	*	1	1	1	
Norfolk	2	*	*	*	*	*	*	*	*	*	*	*	
North Norfolk	*	*	*	*	*	*	1	1	1	1	1	1	
Northern Norfolk	*	*	2	1	1	1	*	*	*	*	*	*	See North N.
North West Norfolk	*	*	*	*	*	*	*	*	1	1	1	1	
North Western Norfolk	*	*	*	1	*	*	*	*	*	*	*	*	See North West N.
South Norfolk	*	*	*	*	*	*	1	1	1	1	1	1	
Southern Norfolk	*	*	2	1	1	1	*	*	*	*	*	*	See South N.
South West Norfolk	*	*	*	*	*	*	1	1	1	1	1	1	
South-Western Norfolk	*	*	*	1	1	1	*	*	*	*	*	*	See South West N.
Western Norfolk	*	2	2	*	*	*	*	*	*	*	*	*	Art. West N.
Normanton	*	*	*	1	1	1	1	1	1	1	1	*	
Normanton, Pontefract and Castleford	*	*	*	*	*	*	*	*	*	*	*	1	
Northallerton	2	1	1	*	*	*	*	*	*	*	*	*	
Northampton	2	2	2	2	1	1	1	1	*	*	*	*	
Northampton North	*	*	*	*	*	*	*	*	1	1	1	1	
Northampton South	*	*	*	*	*	*	*	*	1	1	1	1	
Eastern Northamptonshire	*	*	*	1	*	*	*	*	*	*	*	*	Art. East N.
Mid Northamptonshire	*	*	*	1	*	*	*	*	*	*	*	*	See Kettering
Northern Northamptonshire	*	2	2	1	*	*	*	*	*	*	*	*	Art. North N.
Northamptonshire	2	*	*	*	*	*	*	*	*	*	*	*	
South Northamptonshire	*	*	*	*	*	*	*	*	*	*	*	1	
Southern Northamptonshire	*	2	2	1	*	*	*	*	*	*	*	*	See South N.
South Northants	*	*	*	*	*	*	1	1	*	*	*	*	See South N.
Northavon	*	*	*	*	*	*	*	*	*	1	1	*	
Northern Northumberland	*	2	2	*	*	*	*	*	*	*	*	*	Art. North N.
Northumberland	2	*	*	*	*	*	*	*	*	*	*	*	
Southern Northumberland	*	2	2	*	*	*	*	*	*	*	*	*	Art. South N.
Northwich	*	*	*	1	1	1	1	1	1	*	*	*	
Norwich	2	2	2	2	2	2	*	*	*	*	*	*	
Norwich North	*	*	*	*	*	*	1	1	1	1	1	1	
Norwich South	*	*	*	*	*	*	1	1	1	1	1	1	
Norwood	*	*	*	*	*	*	*	*	*	1	*	*	
Nottingham	2	2	2	*	*	*	*	*	*	*	*	*	
Nottingham Central	*	*	*	*	1	1	1	1	*	*	*	*	
Nottingham East	*	*	*	1	1	1	1	*	1	1	1	1	
Nottingham North	*	*	*	*	*	*	*	1	1	1	1	1	
Nottingham North West	*	*	*	*	*	*	1	*	*	*	*	*	
Nottingham South	*	*	*	1	1	1	1	1	*	1	1	1	
Nottingham West	*	*	*	1	1	1	*	1	1	*	*	*	
Northern Nottinghamshire	*	2	2	*	*	*	*	*	*	*	*	*	Art. North N.
Nottinghamshire	2	*	*	*	*	*	*	*	*	*	*	*	
Southern Nottinghamshire	*	2	2	*	*	*	*	*	*	*	*	*	Art. South N.
Nuneaton	*	*	*	1	1	1	1	1	1	1	1	1	

== O ==
Constituency	1707	1832	1868	1885	1918	1945	1950	1955	1974	1983	1997	2010	Note
Okehampton	2	*	*	*	*	*	*	*	*	*	*	*	
Old Bexley and Sidcup	*	*	*	*	*	*	*	*	*	1	1	1	
Oldbury and Halesowen	*	*	*	*	*	*	1	1	*	*	*	*	
Oldham	*	2	2	2	2	2	*	*	*	*	*	*	
Oldham Central and Royton	*	*	*	*	*	*	*	*	*	1	*	*	
Oldham East	*	*	*	*	*	*	1	1	1	*	*	*	
Oldham East and Saddleworth	*	*	*	*	*	*	*	*	*	*	1	1	
Oldham West	*	*	*	*	*	*	1	1	1	1	*	*	
Oldham West and Royton	*	*	*	*	*	*	*	*	*	*	1	1	
Old Sarum	2	*	*	*	*	*	*	*	*	*	*	*	
Orford	2	*	*	*	*	*	*	*	*	*	*	*	
Ormskirk	*	*	*	1	1	1	1	1	1	*	*	*	
Orpington	*	*	*	*	*	1	1	1	*	1	1	1	
Osgoldcross	*	*	*	1	*	*	*	*	*	*	*	*	
Oswestry	*	*	*	1	1	1	1	1	1	*	*	*	
Otley	*	*	*	1	*	*	*	*	*	*	*	*	
Oxford	2	2	2	1	1	1	1	1	1	*	*	*	
Oxford East	*	*	*	*	*	*	*	*	*	1	1	1	
Oxford West and Abingdon	*	*	*	*	*	*	*	*	*	1	1	1	
Oxford University	2	2	2	2	*	*	*	*	*	*	*	*	
The University of Oxford	*	*	*	*	2	2	*	*	*	*	*	*	See Oxford University
Oxfordshire	2	3	3	*	*	*	*	*	*	*	*	*	
Mid-Oxon	*	*	*	*	*	*	*	*	1	*	*	*	Art. Mid Oxfordshire

== P ==
Constituency	1707	1832	1868	1885	1918	1945	1950	1955	1974	1983	1997	2010	Note
Paddington	*	*	*	*	*	*	*	*	*	*	*	*	
Paddington North	*	*	*	1	1	1	1	1	*	*	*	*	
Paddington South	*	*	*	1	1	1	1	1	*	*	*	*	
Peckham	*	*	*	*	*	*	*	*	*	1	*	*	
Pendle	*	*	*	*	*	*	*	*	*	1	1	1	
Penistone	*	*	*	*	1	1	1	1	1	*	*	*	
Penistone and Stocksbridge	*	*	*	*	*	*	*	*	*	*	*	1	
Penrith	*	*	*	1	*	*	*	*	*	*	*	*	
Penrith and Cockermouth	*	*	*	*	1	1	*	*	*	*	*	*	
Penrith and the Border	*	*	*	*	*	*	1	1	1	*	*	*	
Penrith and The Border	*	*	*	*	*	*	*	*	*	1	1	1	
Penryn	2	*	*	*	*	*	*	*	*	*	*	*	
Penryn and Falmouth	*	2	2	1	1	1	*	*	*	*	*	*	
Peterborough	2	2	2	1	1	1	1	1	1	1	1	1	
Petersfield	2	1	1	1	1	1	1	1	1	*	*	*	
Plymouth	2	2	2	2	*	*	*	*	*	*	*	*	
Plymouth, Devonport	*	*	*	*	1	1	1	1	1	1	1	*	
Plymouth, Drake	*	*	*	*	1	1	*	*	1	1	*	*	
Plymouth, Moor View	*	*	*	*	*	*	*	*	*	*	*	1	
Plymouth, Sutton	*	*	*	*	1	1	1	1	1	1	1	*	
Plymouth, Sutton and Devonport	*	*	*	*	*	*	*	*	*	*	*	1	
Plympton Erle	2	*	*	*	*	*	*	*	*	*	*	*	
Pontefract	2	2	2	1	1	1	1	1	*	*	*	*	
Pontefract and Castleford	*	*	*	*	*	*	*	*	1	1	1	*	
Poole	2	2	1	*	*	*	1	1	1	1	1	1	
Poplar	*	*	*	*	*	*	1	1	*	*	*	*	
Poplar and Canning Town	*	*	*	*	*	*	*	*	*	*	1	*	
Poplar and Limehouse	*	*	*	*	*	*	*	*	*	*	*	1	
Poplar, Bow and Bromley	*	*	*	*	1	1	*	*	*	*	*	*	Art. Bow and Bromley
South Poplar	*	*	*	*	1	1	*	*	*	*	*	*	
Portsmouth	2	2	2	2	*	*	*	*	*	*	*	*	
Portsmouth Central	*	*	*	*	1	1	*	*	*	*	*	*	
Portsmouth, Langstone	*	*	*	*	*	*	1	1	*	*	*	*	
Portsmouth North	*	*	*	*	1	1	*	*	1	1	1	1	
Portsmouth South	*	*	*	*	1	1	1	1	1	1	1	1	
Portsmouth West	*	*	*	*	*	*	1	1	*	*	*	*	
Preston	2	2	2	2	2	2	*	*	*	1	1	1	
Preston North	*	*	*	*	*	*	1	1	1	*	*	*	
Preston South	*	*	*	*	*	*	1	1	1	*	*	*	
Prestwich	*	*	*	1	*	*	*	*	*	*	*	*	
Pudsey	*	*	*	1	*	*	1	1	1	1	1	1	
Pudsey and Otley	*	*	*	*	1	1	*	*	*	*	*	*	
Putney	*	*	*	*	*	*	*	*	*	1	1	1	

== Q ==
Constituency	1707	1832	1868	1885	1918	1945	1950	1955	1974	1983	1997	2010	Note
Queenborough	2	*	*	*	*	*	*	*	*	*	*	*	

== R ==
Constituency	1707	1832	1868	1885	1918	1945	1950	1955	1974	1983	1997	2010	Note
Radcliffe-cum-Farnworth	*	*	*	1	*	*	*	*	*	*	*	*	See Farnworth
Ramsey	*	*	*	1	*	*	*	*	*	*	*	*	
Ravensbourne	*	*	*	*	*	*	*	*	*	1	*	*	
Rayleigh	*	*	*	*	*	*	*	*	*	*	1	*	
Rayleigh and Wickford	*	*	*	*	*	*	*	*	*	*	*	1	
Reading	2	2	2	*	*	*	*	*	*	*	*	*	PB of Reading
Reading	*	*	*	1	1	1	*	1	*	*	*	*	
Reading East	*	*	*	*	*	*	*	*	*	1	1	1	
Reading North	*	*	*	*	*	*	1	*	1	*	*	*	
Reading South	*	*	*	*	*	*	1	*	1	*	*	*	
Reading West	*	*	*	*	*	*	*	*	*	1	1	1	
Redbridge, Ilford North	*	*	*	*	*	*	*	*	1	*	*	*	See Ilford North
Redbridge, Ilford South	*	*	*	*	*	*	*	*	1	*	*	*	See Ilford South
Redbridge, Wanstead and Woodford	*	*	*	*	*	*	*	*	1	*	*	*	See Wanstead & W.
Redcar	*	*	*	*	*	*	*	*	*	1	1	1	
Redditch	*	*	*	*	*	*	*	*	*	*	1	1	
Regent's Park and Kensington North	*	*	*	*	*	*	*	*	*	*	1	*	
Reigate	2	1	*	1	1	1	1	1	1	1	1	1	
Ribble Valley	*	*	*	*	*	*	*	*	*	1	1	1	
South Ribble	*	*	*	*	*	*	*	*	*	1	1	1	
Richmond and Barnes	*	*	*	*	*	*	*	*	*	1	*	*	
Richmond Park	*	*	*	*	*	*	*	*	*	*	1	1	
Richmond (Surrey)	*	*	*	*	*	*	1	1	*	*	*	*	Official suffix
Richmond (Surrey)	*	*	*	*	1	1	*	*	*	*	*	*	Unofficial suffix
Richmond upon Thames, Richmond	*	*	*	*	*	*	*	*	1	*	*	*	See Richmond (Surrey)
Richmond upon Thames, Twickenham	*	*	*	*	*	*	*	*	1	*	*	*	See Twickenham
Richmond (Yorks)	2	2	1	1	1	1	*	*	*	*	*	*	Unofficial suffix
Richmond (Yorks)	*	*	*	*	*	*	1	1	1	1	1	1	Official suffix
Ripon	2	2	1	1	1	1	1	1	1	*	*	*	
Rochdale	*	1	1	1	1	1	1	1	1	1	1	1	
Rochester	2	2	2	1	*	*	*	*	*	*	*	*	
Rochester and Chatham	*	*	*	*	*	*	1	1	1	*	*	*	
Rochester and Strood	*	*	*	*	*	*	*	*	*	*	*	1	
Rochester, Chatham	*	*	*	*	1	1	*	*	*	*	*	*	See Chatham
Rochester, Gillingham	*	*	*	*	1	1	*	*	*	*	*	*	See Gillingham
Rochford	*	*	*	*	*	*	*	*	*	1	*	*	
Rochford and Southend East	*	*	*	*	*	*	*	*	*	*	1	1	
Romford	*	*	*	1	1	1	1	1	*	1	1	1	
Romsey	*	*	*	*	*	*	*	*	*	*	1	*	
Romsey and Southampton North	*	*	*	*	*	*	*	*	*	*	*	1	
Romsey and Waterside	*	*	*	*	*	*	*	*	*	1	*	*	See Romsey
Ross (Herefordshire)	*	*	*	1	*	*	*	*	*	*	*	*	
Rossendale	*	*	*	1	1	1	1	1	1	*	*	*	
Rossendale and Darwen	*	*	*	*	*	*	*	*	*	1	1	1	
Rother Valley	*	*	*	*	1	1	1	1	1	1	1	1	
Rotherham	*	*	*	1	1	1	1	1	1	1	1	1	
Rothwell	*	*	*	*	1	1	*	*	*	*	*	*	
Rowley Regis and Tipton	*	*	*	*	*	*	1	1	*	*	*	*	
Royton	*	*	*	*	1	1	*	*	*	*	*	*	
Rugby	*	*	*	1	1	1	1	1	1	*	*	1	
Rugby and Kenilworth	*	*	*	*	*	*	*	*	*	1	1	*	
Ruislip-Northwood	*	*	*	*	*	*	1	1	*	1	1	*	
Ruislip, Northwood and Pinner	*	*	*	*	*	*	*	*	*	*	*	1	
Runcorn	*	*	*	*	*	*	1	1	1	*	*	*	
Runnymede and Weybridge	*	*	*	*	*	*	*	*	*	*	1	1	
Rushcliffe	*	*	*	1	1	1	1	1	1	1	1	1	
Rutland	2	2	2	1	*	*	*	*	*	*	*	*	
Rutland and Melton	*	*	*	*	*	*	*	*	*	1	1	1	
Rutland and Stamford	*	*	*	*	1	1	1	1	1	*	*	*	
Rye	2	1	1	1	1	1	*	1	1	*	*	*	
Ryedale	*	*	*	*	*	*	*	*	*	1	1	*	

== S ==
Constituency	1707	1832	1868	1885	1918	1945	1950	1955	1974	1983	1997	2010	Note
Saffron Walden	*	*	*	1	1	1	1	1	1	1	1	1	
St. Albans	2	(2)	*	1	1	1	1	1	1	1	1	1	Disfranchised 1852
St. Augustine's	*	*	*	1	*	*	*	*	*	*	*	*	
St. Austell	*	*	*	1	*	*	*	*	*	*	*	*	
St Austell and Newquay	*	*	*	*	*	*	*	*	*	*	*	1	
St. George, Hanover Square	*	*	*	1	*	*	*	*	*	*	*	*	
St. Germans	2	*	*	*	*	*	*	*	*	*	*	*	
St. Helens	*	*	*	1	*	*	1	1	1	*	*	*	
St Helens North	*	*	*	*	*	*	*	*	*	*	*	1	
St. Helens North	*	*	*	*	*	*	*	*	*	1	1	*	
St. Helens South	*	*	*	*	*	*	*	*	*	1	1	*	
St Helens South and Whiston	*	*	*	*	*	*	*	*	*	*	*	1	
St. Helen's	*	*	*	*	1	1	*	*	*	*	*	*	
St. Ives	2	1	1	1	1	1	1	1	1	1	1	*	
St Ives	*	*	*	*	*	*	*	*	*	*	*	1	
St. Mawes	2	*	*	*	*	*	*	*	*	*	*	*	
St. Marylebone	*	*	*	*	1	1	1	1	*	*	*	*	
St. Pancras East	*	*	*	1	*	*	*	*	*	*	*	*	
St. Pancras North	*	*	*	1	1	1	1	1	*	*	*	*	
St. Pancras South	*	*	*	1	*	*	*	*	*	*	*	*	
St. Pancras South East	*	*	*	*	1	1	*	*	*	*	*	*	
St. Pancras South West	*	*	*	*	1	1	*	*	*	*	*	*	
St. Pancras West	*	*	*	1	*	*	*	*	*	*	*	*	
Salford	*	1	2	*	*	*	*	*	*	*	1	*	
Salford and Eccles	*	*	*	*	*	*	*	*	*	*	*	1	
Salford East	*	*	*	*	*	*	1	1	1	1	*	*	
Salford North	*	*	*	1	1	1	*	*	*	*	*	*	
Salford South	*	*	*	1	1	1	*	*	*	*	*	*	
Salford West	*	*	*	1	1	1	1	1	1	*	*	*	
Salisbury	2	2	2	1	1	1	1	1	1	1	1	1	
Saltash	2	*	*	*	*	*	*	*	*	*	*	*	
Sandwich	2	2	(2)	*	*	*	*	*	*	*	*	*	Disfranchised 1885
Scarborough	2	2	2	1	*	*	*	*	1	1	*	*	
Scarborough and Whitby	*	*	*	*	1	1	1	1	*	*	1	1	
Scunthorpe	*	*	*	*	*	*	*	*	*	*	1	1	
Seaford	2	*	*	*	*	*	*	*	*	*	*	*	
Seaham	*	*	*	*	1	1	*	*	*	*	*	*	
Sedgefield	*	*	*	*	1	1	1	1	*	1	1	1	
Sefton Central	*	*	*	*	*	*	*	*	*	*	*	1	
Selby	*	*	*	*	*	*	*	*	*	1	1	*	
Selby and Ainsty	*	*	*	*	*	*	*	*	*	*	*	1	
Sevenoaks	*	*	*	1	1	1	1	1	1	1	1	1	
Shaftesbury	2	1	1	*	*	*	*	*	*	*	*	*	
Sheffield	*	2	2	*	*	*	*	*	*	*	*	*	
Sheffield, Attercliffe	*	*	*	1	1	1	1	1	1	1	1	*	
Sheffield, Brightside	*	*	*	1	1	1	1	1	1	1	1	*	
Sheffield, Brightside and Hillsborough	*	*	*	*	*	*	*	*	*	*	*	1	
Sheffield Central	*	*	*	1	1	1	*	*	*	1	1	1	
Sheffield Ecclesall	*	*	*	1	1	1	*	*	*	*	*	*	
Sheffield, Hallam	*	*	*	1	1	1	1	1	1	1	1	1	
Sheffield, Heeley	*	*	*	*	*	*	1	1	1	1	1	1	
Sheffield, Hillsborough	*	*	*	*	1	1	1	1	1	1	1	*	
Sheffield, Neepsend	*	*	*	*	*	*	1	*	*	*	*	*	
Sheffield, Park	*	*	*	*	1	1	1	1	1	*	*	*	
Sheffield South East	*	*	*	*	*	*	*	*	*	*	*	1	
Sherwood	*	*	*	*	*	*	*	*	*	1	1	1	
Shipley	*	*	*	1	1	1	1	1	1	1	1	1	
Shoreditch	*	*	*	*	1	1	*	*	*	*	*	*	
Shoreditch and Finsbury	*	*	*	*	*	*	1	1	*	*	*	*	
Shoreditch, Haggerston	*	*	*	1	*	*	*	*	*	*	*	*	
Shoreditch, Hoxton	*	*	*	1	*	*	*	*	*	*	*	*	
Shoreham	*	*	*	*	*	*	*	*	1	1	*	*	Inc. New Shoreham
Shrewsbury	2	2	2	1	1	1	1	1	1	*	*	*	
Shrewsbury and Atcham	*	*	*	*	*	*	*	*	*	1	1	1	
North Shropshire	*	*	*	*	*	*	*	*	*	1	1	1	
Northern Shropshire	*	2	2	*	*	*	*	*	*	*	*	*	
Shropshire	2	*	*	*	*	*	*	*	*	*	*	*	
Southern Shropshire	*	2	2	*	*	*	*	*	*	*	*	*	
Sidcup	*	*	*	*	*	*	*	*	*	*	*	*	
Sittingbourne and Sheppey	*	*	*	*	*	*	*	*	*	*	1	1	
Skipton	*	*	*	1	1	1	1	1	1	*	*	*	
Skipton and Ripon	*	*	*	*	*	*	*	*	*	1	1	1	
Sleaford	*	*	*	1	*	*	*	*	*	*	*	*	
Sleaford and North Hykeham	*	*	*	*	*	*	*	*	*	*	1	1	
Slough	*	*	*	*	*	*	*	*	*	1	1	1	
Smethwick	*	*	*	*	1	1	1	1	*	*	*	*	
Solihull	*	*	*	*	*	1	1	1	1	1	1	1	
Eastern Somerset	*	2	2	1	*	*	*	*	*	*	*	*	Art. East Somerset
Mid Somerset	*	*	2	*	*	*	*	*	*	*	*	*	
North Somerset	*	*	*	*	*	*	1	1	1	*	*	1	
Northern Somerset	*	*	*	1	*	*	*	*	*	*	*	*	See North Somerset
North East Somerset	*	*	*	*	*	*	*	*	*	*	*	1	
Somerset	2	*	*	*	*	*	*	*	*	*	*	*	
Southern Somerset	*	*	*	1	*	*	*	*	*	*	*	*	Art. South Somerset
Western Somerset	*	2	2	*	*	*	*	*	*	*	*	*	Art. West Somerset
Somerton and Frome	*	*	*	*	*	*	*	*	*	1	1	1	
Southall	*	*	*	*	*	1	1	1	*	*	*	*	
Southampton	2	2	2	2	2	2	*	*	*	*	*	*	
Southampton, Itchen	*	*	*	*	*	*	1	1	1	1	1	1	
Southampton, Test	*	*	*	*	*	*	1	1	1	1	1	1	
Southend East	*	*	*	*	*	*	1	1	1	1	*	*	
Southend-on-Sea	*	*	*	*	1	1	*	*	*	*	*	*	
Southend West	*	*	*	*	*	*	1	1	1	1	1	1	
Southgate	*	*	*	*	*	*	1	1	*	*	*	*	
South Hams	*	*	*	*	*	*	*	*	*	1	*	*	
South Molton	*	*	*	1	1	1	*	*	*	*	*	*	
Southport	*	*	*	1	1	1	1	1	1	1	1	1	
South Shields	*	1	1	1	1	1	1	1	1	1	1	1	
North Southwark and Bermondsey	*	*	*	*	*	*	*	*	*	*	1	*	
Southwark	2	2	2	*	*	*	1	1	*	*	*	*	
Southwark and Bermondsey	*	*	*	*	*	*	*	*	*	1	*	*	
Southwark, Bermondsey	*	*	*	1	*	*	*	*	1	*	*	*	
Southwark Central	*	*	*	*	1	1	*	*	*	*	*	*	
Southwark, Dulwich	*	*	*	*	*	*	*	*	1	*	*	*	
Southwark North	*	*	*	*	1	1	*	*	*	*	*	*	
Southwark, Peckham	*	*	*	*	*	*	*	*	1	*	*	*	
Southwark, Rotherhithe	*	*	*	1	*	*	*	*	*	*	*	*	
Southwark South East	*	*	*	*	1	1	*	*	*	*	*	*	
Southwark West	*	*	*	1	*	*	*	*	*	*	*	*	
Sowerby	*	*	*	1	1	1	1	1	1	*	*	*	
Spalding	*	*	*	1	*	*	*	*	*	*	*	*	
Spelthorne	*	*	*	*	1	1	1	1	1	1	1	1	
Spennymoor	*	*	*	*	1	1	*	*	*	*	*	*	
Spen Valley	*	*	*	1	1	1	*	*	*	*	*	*	
Stafford	2	2	2	1	1	1	*	*	*	1	1	1	
Stafford and Stone	*	*	*	*	*	*	1	1	1	*	*	*	
Eastern Staffordshire	*	*	2	*	*	*	*	*	*	*	*	*	
Mid Staffordshire	*	*	*	*	*	*	*	*	*	1	*	*	
Northern Staffordshire	*	2	2	*	*	*	*	*	*	*	*	*	
North-Western Staffordshire	*	*	*	1	*	*	*	*	*	*	*	*	
South Staffordshire	*	*	*	*	*	*	*	*	*	1	1	1	
Southern Staffordshire	*	2	2	*	*	*	*	*	*	*	*	*	
South East Staffordshire	*	*	*	*	*	*	*	*	*	1	*	*	
South West Staffordshire	*	*	*	*	*	*	*	*	1	*	*	*	
Staffordshire	2	*	*	*	*	*	*	*	*	*	*	*	
Staffordshire Moorlands	*	*	*	*	*	*	*	*	*	1	1	1	
Western Staffordshire	*	*	2	1	*	*	*	*	*	*	*	*	
Stalybridge	*	*	1	1	*	*	*	*	*	*	*	*	
Stalybridge and Hyde	*	*	*	*	1	1	1	1	1	1	1	1	
Stamford	2	2	1	1	*	*	*	*	*	*	*	*	
Stamford and Spalding	*	*	*	*	*	*	*	*	*	1	*	*	
Stepney	*	*	*	*	*	*	1	1	*	*	*	*	
Stepney and Poplar	*	*	*	*	*	*	*	*	*	*	*	*	
Stepney, Limehouse	*	*	*	*	1	1	*	*	*	*	*	*	See Limehouse
Stepney, Mile End	*	*	*	*	1	1	*	*	*	*	*	*	See Mile End
Stepney, Whitechapel and St. George's	*	*	*	*	1	1	*	*	*	*	*	*	See Whitech. & St G.
Stevenage	*	*	*	*	*	*	*	*	*	1	1	1	
Steyning	2	*	*	*	*	*	*	*	*	*	*	*	
Stockbridge	2	*	*	*	*	*	*	*	*	*	*	*	
Stockport	*	2	2	2	2	2	*	*	*	1	1	1	
Stockport North	*	*	*	*	*	*	1	1	1	*	*	*	
Stockport South	*	*	*	*	*	*	1	1	1	*	*	*	
Stockton North	*	*	*	*	*	*	*	*	*	1	1	1	
Stockton-on-Tees	*	*	1	1	1	1	1	1	*	*	*	*	
Stockton South	*	*	*	*	*	*	*	*	*	1	1	1	
Stoke Newington	*	*	*	*	1	1	*	*	*	*	*	*	
Stoke Newington and Hackney North	*	*	*	*	*	*	1	1	*	*	*	*	
Stoke-upon-Trent	*	2	2	1	*	*	*	*	*	*	*	*	
Stoke-on-Trent, Burslem	*	*	*	*	1	1	*	*	*	*	*	*	
Stoke-on-Trent Central	*	*	*	*	*	*	1	1	*	*	*	*	
Stoke-on-Trent Central	*	*	*	*	*	*	*	*	1	1	1	1	
Stoke-on-Trent, Hanley	*	*	*	*	1	1	*	*	*	*	*	*	
Stoke-on-Trent North	*	*	*	*	*	*	1	1	*	*	*	*	
Stoke-on-Trent North	*	*	*	*	*	*	*	*	1	1	1	1	
Stoke-on-Trent South	*	*	*	*	*	*	1	1	*	*	*	*	
Stoke-on-Trent South	*	*	*	*	*	*	*	*	1	1	1	1	
Stoke-on-Trent, Stoke	*	*	*	*	1	1	*	*	*	*	*	*	
Stone	*	*	*	*	1	1	*	*	*	*	1	1	
Stourbridge	*	*	*	*	1	1	*	*	*	*	1	1	
Stowmarket	*	*	*	1	*	*	*	*	*	*	*	*	
Strand	*	*	*	1	*	*	*	*	*	*	*	*	
Stratford	*	*	*	*	*	*	1	1	*	*	*	*	
Stratford-on-Avon	*	*	*	1	*	*	*	*	1	1	1	1	
Streatham	*	*	*	*	*	*	*	*	*	1	1	1	
Stretford	*	*	*	1	1	1	1	1	1	1	*	*	
Stretford and Urmston	*	*	*	*	*	*	*	*	*	*	1	1	
Stroud	*	2	2	1	1	1	*	1	1	1	1	1	
Stroud and Thornbury	*	*	*	*	*	*	1	*	*	*	*	*	
Sudbury	2	(2)	*	1	1	1	*	*	*	*	*	*	BC disfranchised 1844
Sudbury and Woodbridge	*	*	*	*	*	*	1	1	1	*	*	*	
Central Suffolk	*	*	*	*	*	*	*	*	*	1	*	*	
Central Suffolk and North Ipswich	*	*	*	*	*	*	*	*	*	*	1	1	
Eastern Suffolk	*	2	2	*	*	*	*	*	*	*	*	*	
South Suffolk	*	*	*	*	*	*	*	*	*	1	1	1	
Suffolk	2	*	*	*	*	*	*	*	*	*	*	*	
Suffolk Coastal	*	*	*	*	*	*	*	*	*	1	1	1	
West Suffolk	*	*	*	*	*	*	*	*	*	*	1	1	
Western Suffolk	*	2	2	*	*	*	*	*	*	*	*	*	
Sunderland	*	2	2	2	2	2	*	*	*	*	*	*	
Sunderland Central	*	*	*	*	*	*	*	*	*	*	*	1	
Sunderland North	*	*	*	*	*	*	1	1	1	1	1	*	
Sunderland South	*	*	*	*	*	*	1	1	1	1	1	*	
Surbiton	*	*	*	*	*	*	*	1	*	1	*	*	
East Surrey	*	*	*	*	*	*	1	1	1	1	1	1	
Eastern Surrey	*	2	2	*	1	1	*	*	*	*	*	*	
Mid Surrey	*	*	2	*	*	*	*	*	*	*	*	*	
North West Surrey	*	*	*	*	*	*	*	*	1	1	*	*	
South West Surrey	*	*	*	*	*	*	*	*	*	1	1	1	
Surrey	2	*	*	*	*	*	*	*	*	*	*	*	
Surrey Heath	*	*	*	*	*	*	*	*	*	*	1	1	
Western Surrey	*	2	2	*	*	*	*	*	*	*	*	*	
Eastern Sussex	*	2	2	*	*	*	*	*	*	*	*	*	
Mid Sussex	*	*	*	*	*	*	*	*	*	1	1	1	
Mid-Sussex	*	*	*	*	*	*	*	*	1	*	*	*	
Sussex	2	*	*	*	*	*	*	*	*	*	*	*	
Western Sussex	*	2	2	*	*	*	*	*	*	*	*	*	
Sutton and Cheam	*	*	*	*	*	1	1	1	1	1	1	1	
Sutton, Carshalton	*	*	*	*	*	*	*	*	1	*	*	*	
Sutton Coldfield	*	*	*	*	*	1	1	1	1	1	1	1	
Swindon	*	*	*	*	1	1	1	1	1	1	*	*	
North Swindon	*	*	*	*	*	*	*	*	*	*	1	1	
South Swindon	*	*	*	*	*	*	*	*	*	*	1	1	

== T ==
Constituency	1707	1832	1868	1885	1918	1945	1950	1955	1974	1983	1997	2010	Note
Tamworth	2	2	2	1	1	1	*	*	*	*	1	1	
Tatton	*	*	*	*	*	*	*	*	*	1	1	1	
Taunton	2	2	2	1	1	1	1	1	1	1	1	*	
Taunton Deane	*	*	*	*	*	*	*	*	*	*	*	1	
Tavistock	2	2	1	1	1	1	1	1	*	*	*	*	
Teesside, Middlesbrough	*	*	*	*	*	*	*	*	1	*	*	*	
Teesside, Redcar	*	*	*	*	*	*	*	*	1	*	*	*	
Teesside, Stockton	*	*	*	*	*	*	*	*	1	*	*	*	
Teesside, Thornaby	*	*	*	*	*	*	*	*	1	*	*	*	
Teignbridge	*	*	*	*	*	*	*	*	*	1	1	*	
Telford	*	*	*	*	*	*	*	*	*	*	1	1	
Tewkesbury	2	2	1	1	*	*	*	*	*	*	1	1	
East Thanet	*	*	*	*	*	*	*	*	1	*	*	*	
North Thanet	*	*	*	*	*	*	*	*	*	1	1	1	
South Thanet	*	*	*	*	*	*	*	*	*	1	1	1	
West Thanet	*	*	*	*	*	*	*	*	1	*	*	*	
Thetford	2	2	*	*	*	*	*	*	*	*	*	*	
Thirsk	2	1	1	*	*	*	*	*	*	*	*	*	
Thirsk and Malton	*	*	*	1	1	1	1	1	1	*	*	1	
Thornbury	*	*	*	1	1	1	*	*	*	*	*	*	
Thornbury and Yate	*	*	*	*	*	*	*	*	*	*	*	1	
Thurrock	*	*	*	*	*	1	1	1	1	1	1	1	
Tiverton	2	2	2	1	1	1	1	1	1	1	*	*	
Tiverton and Honiton	*	*	*	*	*	*	*	*	*	*	1	1	
Tonbridge	*	*	*	*	1	1	1	1	*	*	*	*	
Tonbridge and Malling	*	*	*	*	*	*	*	*	1	1	1	1	
Tooting	*	*	*	*	*	*	*	*	*	1	1	1	
Torbay	*	*	*	*	*	*	*	*	1	1	1	1	
Torquay	*	*	*	1	1	1	1	1	*	*	*	*	
Torridge and West Devon	*	*	*	*	*	*	*	*	*	1	1	1	
Torrington	*	*	*	*	*	*	1	1	*	*	*	*	
Totnes	2	2	*	1	1	1	1	1	1	*	1	1	
Tottenham	*	*	*	1	*	*	1	1	*	1	1	1	
Tottenham North	*	*	*	*	1	1	*	*	*	*	*	*	
Tottenham South	*	*	*	*	1	1	*	*	*	*	*	*	
Tower Hamlets	*	2	2	*	*	*	*	*	*	*	*	*	
Tower Hamlets, Bethnal Green and Bow	*	*	*	*	*	*	*	*	1	*	*	*	
Tower Hamlets, Bow and Bromley	*	*	*	1	*	*	*	*	*	*	*	*	
Tower Hamlets, Limehouse	*	*	*	1	*	*	*	*	*	*	*	*	
Tower Hamlets, Mile End	*	*	*	1	*	*	*	*	*	*	*	*	
Tower Hamlets, Poplar	*	*	*	1	*	*	*	*	*	*	*	*	
Tower Hamlets, St. George	*	*	*	1	*	*	*	*	*	*	*	*	
Tower Hamlets, Stepney	*	*	*	1	*	*	*	*	*	*	*	*	
Tower Hamlets, Stepney and Poplar	*	*	*	*	*	*	*	*	1	*	*	*	
Tower Hamlets, Whitechapel	*	*	*	1	*	*	*	*	*	*	*	*	
Tregony	2	*	*	*	*	*	*	*	*	*	*	*	
Truro	2	2	2	1	*	*	1	1	1	1	*	*	
Truro and Falmouth	*	*	*	*	*	*	*	*	*	*	*	1	
Truro and St. Austell	*	*	*	*	*	*	*	*	*	*	1	*	
Royal Tunbridge Wells	*	*	*	*	*	*	*	*	1	*	*	*	
Tunbridge	*	*	*	1	*	*	*	*	*	*	*	*	
Tunbridge Wells	*	*	*	*	*	*	*	*	*	1	1	1	
Twickenham	*	*	*	*	1	1	1	1	*	1	1	1	
Tyne Bridge	*	*	*	*	*	*	*	*	*	1	1	*	
Tynemouth	*	*	*	1	1	1	1	1	1	1	1	1	
Tynemouth and North Shields	*	1	1	*	*	*	*	*	*	*	*	*	
Tyneside	*	*	*	1	*	*	*	*	*	*	*	*	
North Tyneside	*	*	*	*	*	*	*	*	*	*	1	1	

== U ==
Constituency	1707	1832	1868	1885	1918	1945	1950	1955	1974	1983	1997	2010	Note
Upminster	*	*	*	*	*	*	*	*	*	1	1	*	
Uxbridge	*	*	*	1	1	1	1	1	*	1	1	*	
Uxbridge and South Ruislip	*	*	*	*	*	*	*	*	*	*	*	1	

== V ==
Constituency	1707	1832	1868	1885	1918	1945	1950	1955	1974	1983	1997	2010	Note
Vauxhall	*	*	*	*	*	*	*	*	*	1	1	1	

== W ==
Constituency	1707	1832	1868	1885	1918	1945	1950	1955	1974	1983	1997	2010	Note
Wakefield	*	1	1	1	1	1	1	1	1	1	1	1	
Wallasey	*	*	*	*	1	1	1	1	1	1	1	1	
Wallingford	2	1	1	*	*	*	*	*	*	*	*	*	
Wallsend	*	*	*	*	1	1	1	1	1	1	*	*	
Walsall	*	1	1	1	1	1	1	*	*	*	*	*	
Walsall North	*	*	*	*	*	*	*	1	1	1	1	1	
Walsall South	*	*	*	*	*	*	*	1	1	1	1	1	
Waltham Forest, Chingford	*	*	*	*	*	*	*	*	1	*	*	*	
Waltham Forest, Leyton	*	*	*	*	*	*	*	*	1	*	*	*	
Waltham Forest, Walthamstow	*	*	*	*	*	*	*	*	1	*	*	*	
Walthamstow	*	*	*	1	*	*	*	*	*	1	1	1	
Walthamstow East	*	*	*	*	1	1	1	1	*	*	*	*	
Walthamstow West	*	*	*	*	1	1	1	1	*	*	*	*	
Wandsworth	*	*	*	1	*	*	*	*	*	*	*	*	
Wandsworth, Balham and Tooting	*	*	*	*	1	1	*	*	*	*	*	*	
Wandsworth, Battersea North	*	*	*	*	*	*	*	*	1	*	*	*	
Wandsworth, Battersea South	*	*	*	*	*	*	*	*	1	*	*	*	
Wandsworth Central	*	*	*	*	1	1	1	1	*	*	*	*	
Wandsworth, Clapham	*	*	*	*	1	1	1	1	*	*	*	*	
Wandsworth, Putney	*	*	*	*	1	1	1	1	1	*	*	*	
Wandsworth, Streatham	*	*	*	*	1	1	1	1	*	*	*	*	
Wandsworth, Tooting	*	*	*	*	*	*	*	*	1	*	*	*	
Wansbeck	*	*	*	1	1	1	*	*	*	1	1	1	
Wansdyke	*	*	*	*	*	*	*	*	*	1	1	*	
Wanstead and Woodford	*	*	*	*	*	*	*	(1)	*	1	*	*	From 1964
Wantage	*	*	*	*	*	*	*	*	*	1	1	1	
Wareham	2	1	1	*	*	*	*	*	*	*	*	*	
Warley	*	*	*	*	*	*	*	*	*	*	1	1	
Warley East	*	*	*	*	*	*	*	*	1	1	*	*	
Warley West	*	*	*	*	*	*	*	*	1	1	*	*	
Warrington	*	1	1	1	1	1	1	1	1	*	*	*	
Warrington North	*	*	*	*	*	*	*	*	*	1	1	1	
Warrington South	*	*	*	*	*	*	*	*	*	1	1	1	
Warwick	2	2	2	*	*	*	*	*	*	*	*	*	
Warwick and Leamington	*	*	*	1	1	1	1	1	1	1	1	1	
North Warwickshire	*	*	*	*	*	*	*	*	*	1	1	1	
Northern Warwickshire	*	2	2	*	*	*	*	*	*	*	*	*	
Southern Warwickshire	*	2	2	*	*	*	*	*	*	*	*	*	
Warwickshire	2	*	*	*	*	*	*	*	*	*	*	*	
Washington and Sunderland West	*	*	*	*	*	*	*	*	*	*	*	1	
Waterloo	*	*	*	*	1	1	*	*	*	*	*	*	
Watford	*	*	*	1	1	1	1	1	1	1	1	1	
Waveney	*	*	*	*	*	*	*	*	*	1	1	1	
Wealden	*	*	*	*	*	*	*	*	*	1	1	1	
Weaver Vale	*	*	*	*	*	*	*	*	*	*	1	1	
Wednesbury	*	*	1	1	1	1	1	1	*	*	*	*	
Wellingborough	*	*	*	*	1	1	1	1	1	1	1	1	
Wellington (Shropshire)	*	*	*	1	*	*	*	*	*	*	*	*	
Wellington (Somerset)	*	*	*	1	*	*	*	*	*	*	*	*	
Wells	2	2	*	1	1	1	1	1	1	1	1	1	
Welwyn and Hatfield	*	*	*	*	*	*	*	*	1	*	*	*	
Welwyn Hatfield	*	*	*	*	*	*	*	*	*	1	1	1	
Wembley North	*	*	*	*	*	1	1	1	*	*	*	*	
Wembley South	*	*	*	*	*	1	1	1	*	*	*	*	
Wendover	2	*	*	*	*	*	*	*	*	*	*	*	
Wenlock	2	2	2	*	*	*	*	*	*	*	*	*	
Wentworth	*	*	*	*	1	1	*	*	*	1	1	*	
Wentworth and Dearne	*	*	*	*	*	*	*	*	*	*	*	1	
Weobley	2	*	*	*	*	*	*	*	*	*	*	*	
West Bromwich	*	*	*	1	1	1	1	1	*	*	*	*	
West Bromwich East	*	*	*	*	*	*	*	*	1	1	1	1	
West Bromwich West	*	*	*	*	*	*	*	*	1	1	1	1	
Westbury	2	1	1	1	1	1	1	1	1	1	1	*	
West Ham	*	*	*	*	*	*	*	*	*	*	1	1	
West Ham North	*	*	*	1	*	*	1	1	*	*	*	*	
West Ham, Plaistow	*	*	*	*	1	1	*	*	*	*	*	*	
West Ham, Silvertown	*	*	*	*	1	1	*	*	*	*	*	*	
West Ham South	*	*	*	1	*	*	1	1	*	*	*	*	
West Ham, Stratford	*	*	*	*	1	1	*	*	*	*	*	*	
West Ham, Upton	*	*	*	*	1	1	*	*	*	*	*	*	
Westhoughton	*	*	*	1	1	1	1	1	1	*	*	*	
West Looe	2	*	*	*	*	*	*	*	*	*	*	*	
City of Westminster, Paddington	*	*	*	*	*	*	*	*	1	*	*	*	
City of Westminster, St. Marylebone	*	*	*	*	*	*	*	*	1	*	*	*	
Westminster	2	2	2	1	*	*	*	*	*	*	*	*	
Westminster, Abbey	*	*	*	*	1	1	*	*	*	*	*	*	
Westminster North	*	*	*	*	*	*	*	*	*	1	*	1	
Westminster, St. George's	*	*	*	*	1	1	*	*	*	*	*	*	
Westmorland	2	2	2	*	1	1	1	1	1	*	*	*	
Westmorland and Lonsdale	*	*	*	*	*	*	*	*	*	1	1	1	
Weston Super Mare	*	*	*	*	*	*	1	1	1	*	*	*	
Weston-Super-Mare	*	*	*	*	*	*	*	*	*	1	1	*	
Weston-super-Mare	*	*	*	*	1	1	*	*	*	*	*	*	
Weymouth and Melcombe Regis	4	2	2	*	*	*	*	*	*	*	*	*	
Whitby	*	1	1	1	*	*	*	*	*	*	*	*	
Whitchurch	2	*	*	*	*	*	*	*	*	*	*	*	
Whitehaven	*	1	1	1	1	1	1	1	1	*	*	*	
Widnes	*	*	*	1	1	1	1	1	1	*	*	*	
Wigan	2	2	2	1	1	1	1	1	1	1	1	1	
Willesden East	*	*	*	*	1	1	1	1	*	*	*	*	
Willesden West	*	*	*	*	1	1	1	1	*	*	*	*	
Wilton	2	1	1	1	*	*	*	*	*	*	*	*	
North Wiltshire	*	*	*	*	*	*	*	*	*	1	1	1	
Northern Wiltshire	*	2	2	*	*	*	*	*	*	*	*	*	
Southern Wiltshire	*	2	2	*	*	*	*	*	*	*	*	*	
South West Wiltshire	*	*	*	*	*	*	*	*	*	*	*	1	
Wiltshire	2	*	*	*	*	*	*	*	*	*	*	*	
Wimbledon	*	*	*	1	1	1	1	1	*	1	1	1	
Winchelsea	2	*	*	*	*	*	*	*	*	*	*	*	
Winchester	2	2	2	1	1	1	1	1	1	1	1	1	
Windsor	*	*	*	1	1	1	1	1	*	*	1	1	See New Windsor
Windsor and Maidenhead	*	*	*	*	*	*	*	*	1	1	*	*	
Wirral	*	*	*	1	1	1	1	1	1	*	*	*	
Wirral South	*	*	*	*	*	*	*	*	*	1	1	1	
Wirral West	*	*	*	*	*	*	*	*	*	1	1	1	
Wisbech	*	*	*	1	*	*	*	*	*	*	*	*	
Witham	*	*	*	*	*	*	*	*	*	*	*	1	
Witney	*	*	*	*	*	*	*	*	*	1	1	1	
Woking	*	*	*	*	*	*	1	1	1	1	1	1	
Wokingham	*	*	*	1	*	*	1	1	1	1	1	1	
Wolverhampton	*	2	2	*	*	*	*	*	*	*	*	*	
Wolverhampton, Bilston	*	*	*	*	1	1	*	*	*	*	*	*	
Wolverhampton East	*	*	*	1	1	1	*	*	*	*	*	*	
Wolverhampton North East	*	*	*	*	*	*	1	1	1	1	1	1	
Wolverhampton South	*	*	*	1	*	*	*	*	*	*	*	*	
Wolverhampton South East	*	*	*	*	*	*	*	*	1	1	1	1	
Wolverhampton South West	*	*	*	*	*	*	1	1	1	1	1	1	
Wolverhampton West	*	*	*	1	1	1	*	*	*	*	*	*	
Woodbridge	*	*	*	1	1	1	*	*	*	*	*	*	
Woodford	*	*	*	*	*	1	1	(1)	*	*	*	*	Until 1964
Wood Green	*	*	*	*	1	1	1	1	*	*	*	*	
Woodspring	*	*	*	*	*	*	*	*	*	1	1	*	
Woodstock	*	*	*	1	*	*	*	*	*	*	*	*	See New Woodstock
Woolwich	*	*	*	1	*	*	*	*	*	1	*	*	
Woolwich East	*	*	*	*	1	1	1	1	*	*	*	*	
Woolwich West	*	*	*	*	1	1	1	1	*	*	*	*	
Wootton Bassett	2	*	*	*	*	*	*	*	*	*	*	*	
Worcester	2	2	2	1	1	1	1	1	1	1	1	1	
Eastern Worcestershire	*	2	2	1	*	*	*	*	*	*	*	*	
Mid Worcestershire	*	*	*	*	*	*	*	*	*	1	1	1	
Northern Worcestershire	*	*	*	1	*	*	*	*	*	*	*	*	
South Worcestershire	*	*	*	*	*	*	1	1	1	1	*	*	
West Worcestershire	*	*	*	*	*	*	*	*	*	*	1	1	
Western Worcestershire	*	2	2	*	*	*	*	*	*	*	*	*	
Worcestershire	2	*	*	*	*	*	*	*	*	*	*	*	
Workington	*	*	*	*	1	1	1	1	1	1	1	1	
Worsley	*	*	*	*	*	*	*	*	*	1	1	*	
Worsley and Eccles South	*	*	*	*	*	*	*	*	*	*	*	1	
Worthing	*	*	*	*	*	1	1	1	1	1	*	*	
East Worthing and Shoreham	*	*	*	*	*	*	*	*	*	*	1	1	
Worthing West	*	*	*	*	*	*	*	*	*	*	1	1	
The Wrekin	*	*	*	*	1	1	1	1	1	1	1	1	
Wycombe	*	*	*	1	1	1	1	1	1	1	1	1	See Chipping Wycombe
Wyre	*	*	*	*	*	*	*	*	*	1	*	*	
Wyre and Preston North	*	*	*	*	*	*	*	*	*	*	*	1	
Wyre Forest	*	*	*	*	*	*	*	*	*	1	1	1	
Wythenshawe and Sale East	*	*	*	*	*	*	*	*	*	*	1	1	

== Y ==
Constituency	1707	1832	1868	1885	1918	1945	1950	1955	1974	1983	1997	2010	Note
Yarmouth (Isle of Wight)	2	*	*	*	*	*	*	*	*	*	*	*	Unofficial suffix
Yarmouth (Norfolk)	*	*	*	*	*	*	1	1	1	*	*	*	See Great Yarmouth
Yeovil	*	*	*	*	1	1	1	1	1	1	1	1	
City of York	*	*	*	*	*	*	*	*	*	*	1	*	Official prefix
Vale of York	*	*	*	*	*	*	*	*	*	*	1	*	Official prefix
York	2	2	2	2	1	1	1	1	1	1	*	*	
York Central	*	*	*	*	*	*	*	*	*	*	*	1	
York Outer	*	*	*	*	*	*	*	*	*	*	*	1	
East Riding of Yorkshire	*	2	2	*	*	*	*	*	*	*	*	*	
East Yorkshire	*	*	*	*	*	*	*	*	*	*	1	1	
Eastern West Riding of Yorkshire	*	*	2	*	*	*	*	*	*	*	*	*	
North Riding of Yorkshire	*	2	2	*	*	*	*	*	*	*	*	*	
Northern West Riding of Yorkshire	*	(2)	2	*	*	*	*	*	*	*	*	*	From 1865
Southern West Riding of Yorkshire	*	(2)	2	*	*	*	*	*	*	*	*	*	From 1865
West Riding of Yorkshire	*	(2)	*	*	*	*	*	*	*	*	*	*	Until 1865
Yorkshire	2+	*	*	*	*	*	*	*	*	*	*	*	4 MPs from 1826

== Sources ==
From	Until	Statute/Statutory Instrument
1707	1832	Act of Union 1707
1832	1868	Reform Act 1832
1868	1885	Reform Act 1867
1885	1918	Redistribution of Seats Act 1885
1918	1950	Representation of the People Act 1918
1950	1955	Representation of the People Act 1948
1955	1974	various statutory instruments in 1955
1974	1983	The Parliamentary Constituencies (England) Order 1970
1983	1997	The Parliamentary Constituencies (England) Order 1983
1997	2010	The Parliamentary Constituencies (England) Order 1995

The 1945 redistribution affected only limited areas, with over-sized constituencies (containing more than 100,000 voters). It was an interim measure before a general review by the Boundary Commission for England.
