= Mildred Gordon (politician) =

British Labour politician (1923–2016)

Member of Parliament for Bow and Poplar
- In office 11 June 1987 – 8 April 1997
- Preceded by: Ian Mikardo
- Succeeded by: Constituency abolished

Personal details
- Born: Mildred Fellerman; 24 August 1923 Stepney, London, England
- Died: 8 April 2016 (aged 92) London, England
- Party: Labour
- Spouses: Sam Gordon (m. 1948; died 1982) Nils Kaare Dahl (m. 1985; died 1996)
- Children: David Gordon

Mildred Gordon (née Fellerman; 24 August 1923 – 8 April 2016) was a British Labour politician.

== Biography ==
=== Early life ===
Mildred Gordon was born the daughter of Judah and Dora Fellerman in Stepney in 1923. Judah was of Dutch Jewish descent, Dora from a Bessarabian Jewish family. Her father and grandfather were stallholders in Watney Market; her father also served as a member of Stepney Borough Council. She attended Betts Street and Christian Street Schools, before attending Raines School and secretarial college. She worked in a solicitor's office, from which she was unable to get release for army service in the Second World War, so she volunteered to be an air raid warden instead. She became a teacher in 1945, and her first post was at Nicholas Gibson School in The Highway, Stepney.

The then Mildred Fellerman married Sam Gordon in 1948, in Reno, Nevada with C. L. R. James as one of the witnesses. The couple lived in New York until 1952. Her husband was at that time the secretary of the Trotskyist Fourth International, and worked as a printer, while Mildred Gordon herself continued in her occupation as a teacher. She and her husband were prevented from returning to the US in 1952, as his passport had been taken, after visiting her family in the UK. Sam Gordon died in 1982; they had one son, David. Mildred's second husband from 1985, until he died in 1996, was Nils Kaare Dahl, who had once been asked to prepare to be Leon Trotsky's bodyguard during his exile in Norway from 1935, and stayed with him for two periods.

Before being elected to Parliament, Gordon was variously a school governor, governor of Hackney College, and a visiting typewriting teacher, retraining women in HM Prison Holloway. She was also the adviser on older women to the Women's Committee of the Greater London Council (GLC) during Ken Livingstone's tenure as GLC Leader. A long-time Labour Party activist, Gordon had been a Labour candidate for Hendon Borough Council, for the GLC, and for the European Parliament in the first direct elections in 1979. She joined the executive of the London Labour Party in 1983.

=== Parliamentary career ===
After leaving teaching in 1985, Gordon was elected Member of Parliament (MP) for Bow and Poplar at the 1987 general election with a majority of 4,631 votes. In her maiden speech in the Commons, Gordon said: "The mark of a civilised society is that it is one in which people can expect to be decently housed and clothed, to have enough to eat and to have access to healthcare and to education for their children".

Tony Benn, in his diary, summarised Gordon's contribution at a meeting of the Campaign Group in February 1989, shortly after the Iranian fatwa against Salman Rushdie for The Satanic Verses was announced. In Gordon's opinion, he wrote, "all fundamentalists and all established churches were enemies of the workers and the people. All religions were reactionary forces keeping the people down and denying the aspirations of working people. She opposed all blasphemy laws".

Gordon's constituency disappeared at the 1997 general election; she was not selected for either of the successor seats, being succeeded by Jim Fitzpatrick in Poplar and Canning Town, while Oona King was elected for Bethnal Green and Bow.

=== Later life ===
Gordon was awarded the Freedom of the Borough of Tower Hamlets in 1999. In 2006, she opened a new block of flats called Thirza House in Shadwell for older people; this was built by Tower Hamlets Community Housing (THCH), a local housing association based in the south-west corner of her former constituency.

She died in April 2016, at the age of 92.

Parliament of the United Kingdom
Preceded by Ian Mikardo	Member of Parliament for Bow and Poplar; 1987–1997	Constituency abolished
