= Stratford and Bow =

UK Parliament constituency (since 2024)

- Borough constituency for the House of Commons
- Interactive map of boundaries from 2024
- Location within Greater London
- County: Greater London
- Electorate: 73,849 (March 2020)

Current constituency
- Created: 2024
- Member of Parliament: Uma Kumaran (Labour)
- Seats: One
- Created from: West Ham, Bethnal Green and Bow & Poplar and Limehouse

Stratford and Bow is a constituency of the House of Commons in the UK Parliament. Further to the completion of the 2023 review of Westminster constituencies, it was first contested at the 2024 general election, since when it has been represented by Uma Kumaran of the Labour Party.

== Constituency profile ==
Driffield Road, Bow

Stratford and Bow is a constituency in Greater London in England, covering parts of the boroughs of Newham and Tower Hamlets. It includes the areas of Stratford, Bow, Bromley-by-Bow, Forest Gate and part of Upton Park.

This constituency covers a densely-populated area of East London, located around 6 miles (9.7 km) east of the centre of the capital. Stratford was a major centre for manufacturing during the industrial era; the area underwent significant regeneration as the main host location of the 2012 Summer Olympics. Most residents of Bow live in flats, many of which are socially rented. Forest Gate largely consists of dense, working-class, Victorian-era terraces. Most of the constituency has above-average levels of deprivation, and house prices here are generally lower than the London average.

Stratford and Bow has a very young population. There is a large proportion of young adults and students and a very low retired population; those over the age of 65 made up only 7% of residents in 2024. Residents have low rates of income compared to the rest of London and very few are homeowners. The child poverty rate is above-average. Residents are generally well-educated and a high proportion work in the finance and public sectors. The percentage claiming unemployment benefits is high.

Stratford and Bow is ethnically diverse. White people made up 39% of the population at the 2021 census. Around two-fifths of the White population are of non-British origin, including large Italian and Romanian communities. Asians, mostly of Bangladeshi origin, were 38% of residents and Black people were 14%.

Most of this constituency is represented by the Green Party at the local council level, with some localists elected in Bromley-by-Bow and Upton Park. Voters in Stratford and Bow strongly supported remaining in the European Union in the 2016 referendum; an estimated 62% voted to remain compared to the UK-wide figure of 48%.

== Boundaries ==
The constituency straddles the River Lea in East London and, under the Parliamentary Constituencies Order 2023, is defined as composing the following (as they existed on 1 December 2020):

- The Borough of Newham wards of Forest Gate North, Forest Gate South, Green Street West, and Stratford and New Town, transferred from West Ham (renamed West Ham and Beckton).
- The Borough of Tower Hamlets wards of Bow East and Bow West, transferred from Bethnal Green and Bow (renamed Bethnal Green and Stepney)
- The Borough of Tower Hamlets ward of Bromley North, transferred from Poplar and Limehouse

Following a local government boundary review in the Borough of Newham which came into effect in May 2022, the constituency now comprises the following from the 2024 general election:

- The London Borough of Newham wards of: Forest Gate North; Forest Gate South; Green Street West (nearly all); Maryland; Stratford; Stratford Olympic Park.
- The London Borough of Tower Hamlets wards of: Bow East; Bow West; Bromley North.

== Election results ==
=== Elections in the 2020s ===
2024 general election: Stratford and Bow
Party	Candidate	Votes	%	±%
Labour	Uma Kumaran	19,145	44.1	−26.3
Green	Joe Hudson-Small	7,511	17.3	+13.6
Workers Party	Halima Khan	3,274	7.5	N/A
Conservative	Kane Blackwell	3,114	7.2	−7.3
Independent	Nizam Ali	2,380	5.5	N/A
Reform	Jeff Evans	2,093	4.8	+2.5
Liberal Democrats	Janey Little	1,926	4.4	−4.6
Independent	Omar Faruk	1,826	4.2	N/A
Independent	Fiona Lali (Note: Lali contested the election as an independent, but with the support of the Revolutionary Communist Party, of which she is a member.)	1,791	4.1	N/A
Independent	Steve Hedley	375	0.9	N/A
Majority		11,634	26.8	−29.1
Turnout		43,435	53.9	−10.3
Registered electors		80,560		
Labour hold		Swing	−20.0	

=== Elections in the 2010s ===
2019 notional result
Party	Vote	%
Labour	33,368	70.4
Conservative	6,877	14.5
Liberal Democrats	4,265	9.0
Green	1,758	3.7
Brexit Party	1,107	2.3
Turnout	47,375	64.2
Electorate	73,849	
