= Bow and Poplar =

UK Parliament constituency (1983–1997)

- Former borough constituency for the House of Commons

1983–1997
- Seats: One
- Created from: Bethnal Green and Bow; Stepney and Poplar
- Replaced by: Poplar and Canning Town and Bethnal Green and Bow

Bow and Poplar was a parliamentary constituency in London which returned one Member of Parliament (MP) to the House of Commons of the Parliament of the United Kingdom.

It was created for the 1983 general election, and abolished for the 1997 general election.

== Boundaries ==
The London Borough of Tower Hamlets wards of Blackwall, Bow, Bromley, East India, Grove, Lansbury, Limehouse, Millwall, Park, and Shadwell.

== Members of Parliament ==
Election	Member	Party
1983	Ian Mikardo	Labour
1987	Mildred Gordon	Labour

== Election results ==
=== Elections in the 1980s ===
General election 1983: Bow and Poplar
Party	Candidate	Votes	%	±%
Labour	Ian Mikardo	15,878	49.6	
Liberal	Eric Flounders	10,017	31.3	
Conservative	Stephen Eyres	5,129	16.0	
National Front	S. Bartlett	596	1.9	
Independent Labour	A.J. Snookes	266	0.8	
Workers Revolutionary	K.R. Scotcher	117	0.4	
Majority		5,861	18.3	
Turnout		32,003	55.4	
Labour win (new seat)				

General election 1987: Bow and Poplar
Party	Candidate	Votes	%	±%
Labour	Mildred Gordon	15,746	46.4	−3.2
Liberal	Eric Flounders	11,115	32.7	+1.4
Conservative	David Hughes	6,810	20.1	+4.1
Workers Revolutionary	Peter Chappell	274	0.8	+0.4
Majority		4,631	13.6	−4.7
Turnout		33,945	57.4	+2.0
Labour hold		Swing	−2.3	

=== Elections in the 1990s ===
General election 1992: Bow and Poplar
Party	Candidate	Votes	%	±%
Labour	Mildred Gordon	18,487	49.5	+3.1
Liberal Democrats	Peter J. Hughes	10,083	27.0	−5.7
Conservative	Simon N.C. Pearce	6,876	18.4	−1.7
BNP	John Tyndall	1,107	3.0	New
Green	Steve Petter	612	1.6	New
Natural Law	William R. Hite	158	0.4	New
Majority		8,404	22.5	+8.9
Turnout		37,323	65.8	+8.4
Labour hold		Swing	+4.4	

== See also ==
- Poplar and Limehouse (UK Parliament constituency)
