= Mr Galloway Goes to Washington =

2005 book by George Galloway

Mr Galloway Goes to Washington: the Brit who set Congress straight about Iraq
- Paperback edition
- Author: George Galloway MP
- Language: English
- Subject: Invasion of Iraq, British politics, American politics, Foreign relations
- Published: London
- Publisher: New Press
- Publication date: 2005
- Publication place: United Kingdom
- Pages: 132
- ISBN: 159558062X
- Dewey Decimal: 956.704431

Mr Galloway Goes to Washington: the Brit who set Congress straight about Iraq is a 2005 book by British politician George Galloway. The book concerned the actions of the United States in invading Iraq, the fallout and Galloway's 2005 appearance before the US senate.

== Background ==
Galloway was a fierce opponent of the Invasion of Iraq, and was expelled from the Labour Party over a number of controversial comments. He subsequently became a leading member of the Respect Party and won the Bethnal Green and Bow constituency in the 2005 United Kingdom general election. The Republican Party (US)-controlled Senate made a number of allegations that Galloway received personal benefits from Saddam Hussein. Galloway comparatively answers the allegations in the Senate committee. The book was published by The New Press.
