= Jim Paice =

British politician (born 1949)

The Right Honourable Sir James Paice DL
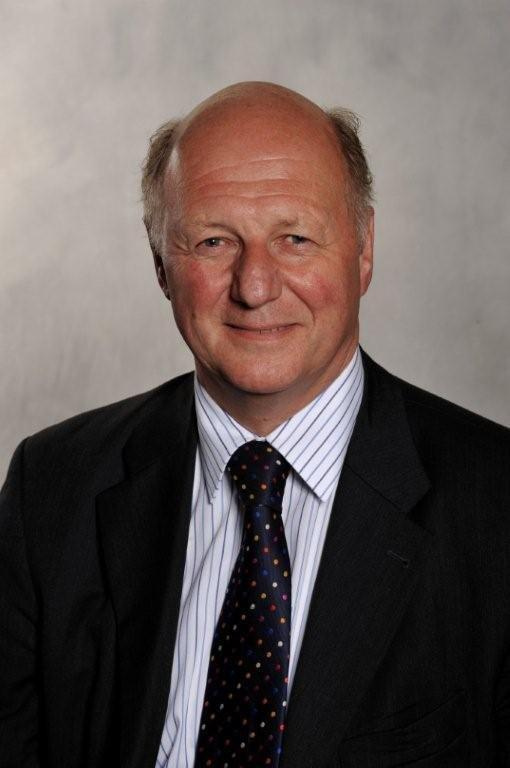
- Official portrait, 2011

Minister of State for Agriculture and Food
- In office 13 May 2010 – 4 September 2012
- Prime Minister: David Cameron
- Preceded by: Jim Fitzpatrick
- Succeeded by: David Heath

Shadow Secretary of State for Agriculture, Fisheries and Food
- In office 15 March 2004 – 6 May 2005
- Leader: Michael Howard
- Preceded by: John Whittingdale
- Succeeded by: Position abolished

Parliamentary Under-Secretary of State for Education and Employment
- In office 21 July 1994 – 2 May 1997
- Prime Minister: John Major
- Preceded by: The Lord Henley (Employment); Tim Boswell (Education)
- Succeeded by: Alan Howarth

Member of Parliament for South East Cambridgeshire
- In office 11 June 1987 – 30 March 2015
- Preceded by: Francis Pym
- Succeeded by: Lucy Frazer

Personal details
- Born: 24 April 1949 (age 77) Felixstowe, England
- Party: Conservative
- Spouse: Ava Patterson
- Education: Writtle University College
- Website: Official website

Sir James Edward Thornton Paice, DL (born 24 April 1949) is a British politician who was the Member of Parliament (MP) for South East Cambridgeshire from 1987 to 2015, when he declined to run for reelection and retired from politics. A member of the Conservative Party, he served as Minister of State at the Department for Environment, Food and Rural Affairs from 2010 until being removed in a government reshuffle in 2012. Following his service in government, Paice was knighted in September 2012.

== Early and personal life ==
Born in Felixstowe, Suffolk, Paice went to the independent Framlingham College. At the Writtle Agricultural College, he received a National Diploma in Agriculture in 1970. He was a farm manager from 1970 to 1973. From 1973 to 1979, he was a farmer and contractor. From 1979 to 1987, he was Training Manager at Framlingham Management and Training Services. At United Framlingham Farmers Ltd, he was non-executive Director from 1987 to 1989, then Director from 1989 to 1994. From 1976 until 1987, he was on Suffolk Coastal District Council, becoming the youngest ever chairman in 1983.

Paice married Ava Patterson in 1973. They have two sons.

== Parliamentary career ==
Paice contested the Caernarfon seat for the Conservatives in the 1979 general election but lost to incumbent Dafydd Wigley of Plaid Cymru. At the 1987 general election he was chosen by the Conservatives to replace their incumbent member of parliament for South East Cambridgeshire, former Foreign Secretary Francis Pym, who was stepping down. Paice won the seat with a majority of 17,502.

At Westminster Paice first served as Secretary of the Backbench Employment Committee from 1988 to 1989 and of the Backbench Horticulture and Markets Sub-Committee (1988–1989). He was also a member of the Employment Select Committee from 1987 until 1989.

Paice was made a minor member of the government in December 1989 as the Parliamentary Private Secretary to the Minister of State at the Ministry of Agriculture, Fisheries and Food, Baroness Trumpington. A year later he became the PPS for John Gummer, who was then the Minister of Agriculture, Fisheries and Food (1990–1993) and later Secretary of State for the Environment (1993–1994). In July 1994 he was promoted to Parliamentary Under Secretary of State at the Department of Employment and served until the Conservative defeat in the 1997 general election.

In opposition, Paice became a spokesman for Agriculture, Fisheries and Food (1997–2001) and later on Home Affairs (2001–2003). Under the leadership of Michael Howard, he was appointed Shadow Minister for Home, Constitutional and Legal Affairs. From September 2004 until his return to government, he served as Shadow Minister for Agriculture, a post he later took up in government.

After the 2010 general election, Paice was appointed Minister of State for Agriculture and Food at the Department for Environment, Food and Rural Affairs in the Conservative-Liberal Democrat coalition government. He served until 4 September 2012 when he was removed as part of a cabinet reshuffle.

On 10 July 2012, during an interview with BBC Radio 4's Farming Today, Paice he admitted that he did not know how much a pint of milk cost. Nevertheless, in October 2013 he was appointed chairman of the Glasgow-based First Milk farmers’ cooperative on an annual salary of £125,000, for which it was proposed that he work one day a week. Under Paice's chairmanship, the co-operative announced in January 2015 that payments to dairy farmers would be deferred by two weeks and that 1.5 pence per litre would be deducted from the payments to pay for “capital investment”. It also announced that from February 2015, it would pay its members an average 21.4 pence per litre – 10p per litre less than some major supermarkets criticised for the low levels of their payments to dairy farmers for milk.

On 8 March 2013, Paice announced that he would stand down at the next general election.

Parliament of the United Kingdom
Preceded by Francis Pym	Member of Parliament for South East Cambridgeshire; 1987–2015	Succeeded by Lucy Frazer
Political offices
Preceded by John Whittingdale	Shadow Secretary of State for Agriculture, Fisheries and Food; 2004–2005	Position abolished
Preceded by Jim Fitzpatrick	Minister of State for Agriculture and Food; 2010–2012	Succeeded by David Heath
