= Apsana Begum =

British politician (born 1990)

Apsana Begum MP
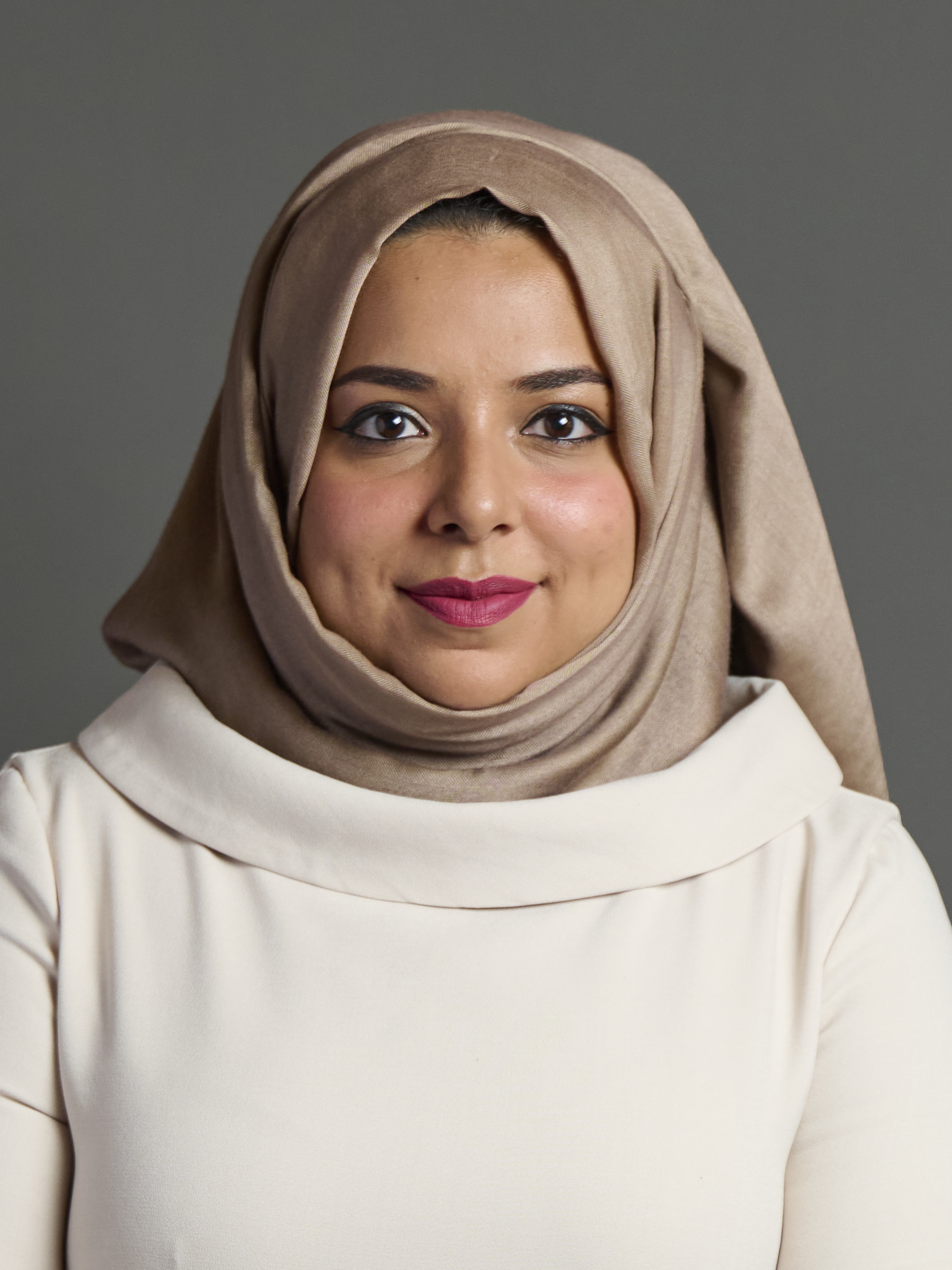
- Official portrait, 2024

Member of Parliament for Poplar and Limehouse
- Incumbent
- Assumed office 12 December 2019
- Preceded by: Jim Fitzpatrick
- Majority: 12,560 (29.2%)

Personal details
- Born: 25 May 1990 (age 36) Shadwell, London, England
- Party: Labour
- Other political affiliations: Socialist Campaign Group
- Spouse: Ehtashamul Haque (m. 2013; div. 2015)
- Education: Queen Mary University of London (BA)
- Website: Official website

Apsana Begum (born 25 May 1990) is a British politician who has been Member of Parliament (MP) for Poplar and Limehouse in east London since 2019. Elected as a member of the Labour Party, Begum had the party whip withdrawn on 23 July 2024 after she voted for an amendment to scrap the two-child benefit cap. Begum regained the party whip in September 2025.

Begum is a member of the left-wing Socialist Campaign Group of MPs. She is the UK's first MP to wear a hijab and is a member of Labour Friends of Palestine and the Middle East.

== Early life and career ==
Apsana Begum was born on 25 May 1990 in Shadwell, to Bangladeshi Muslim parents Manir Uddin Ahmed and Syeda Nazma Begum. She has five sisters and a brother.

Begum graduated with a BA in politics from Queen Mary University of London in 2011, and completed a postgraduate diploma in law and community leadership at SOAS University of London in 2012.

From 2011 to 2013, she worked in the role of Executive Support and Admin for Tower Hamlets Council. She was a Workforce Diversity Project Officer for Tower Hamlets Homes from 2014 to 2015, and Equality and Diversity Officer for Queen Mary University of London from 2016 to 2018.

== Parliamentary career ==
Begum was selected in October 2019 as the Labour candidate for Poplar and Limehouse at the 2019 general election. She was endorsed by the socialist group Momentum and nominated from an all-women shortlist. In response to allegations that the ex-Mayor of Tower Hamlets Lutfur Rahman was behind her political career, Begum told Eastlondonlines "It is grossly insulting, as well as being rooted in racism and misogyny, to assume that I have no agency of my own and that I must be a 'proxy' or 'stooge' for a man I have not spoken to for six years".

In November 2019, the British press reported that Begum had shared a social media post in 2017 that referred to Saudi Arabia's "Zionist masters". In response, Begum unshared the post and said:

"I didn’t make those comments and I shared the article because I was concerned with the treatment of pilgrims who were being harassed in the Mecca Grand Mosque. The original poster used words that were inappropriate, and I wouldn’t use them myself. I’m committed to fighting antisemitism both inside the Labour Party and in wider society."

At the 2019 general election, Begum was elected as MP for Poplar and Limehouse with 63.1% of the vote and a majority of 28,904. Begum delivered her maiden speech in Parliament during a debate about International Women's Day, paying tribute to what she described as the "rich history of women's struggles for social justice" in East London.

In January 2020, Begum told the Eastern Eye about being elected to Parliament that she has had to endure a series of racist, Islamophobic and misogynistic attacks and set out what she saw as the many barriers facing BAME women in public life.

During an interview with Dazed in February 2020, she said "It has been quite horrendous...and it's been quite personalised in terms of attacks. Before being elected, you see other MPs go through that but you don't necessarily appreciate the impact it can have on someone as an individual."

In April 2020, in an article published by Left Foot Forward, Begum raised concerns about the impact of the COVID-19 pandemic on low-income families and black, Asian and minority ethnic people. She said that the communities were at a greater risk due to the higher proportion of members who worked in the health sector. On 12 May, Begum raised the issue again in Parliament, highlighting new data released by Tower Hamlets Council.

Begum opposed extradition of Julian Assange and in July sponsored a related motion in parliament.

Begum commented in November 2020 that the Labour Party "has been in denial" about the problem of Islamophobia. She told ITV News: "It's quite regular to be asked questions and to constantly be asked to reaffirm my commitment towards British society as if in some way my identity and politics are not compatible." The same month, Begum tabled an Early Day Motion in Parliament highlighting a surge in racist attacks and Islamophobia in Britain and abroad, and wrote about her experiences "as someone who has first-hand experience of the rise in Islamophobia over the past decades" saying that "I know that every single day people of Muslim backgrounds like me face discrimination and prejudice."

On 24 February 2022, following the 2022 Russian invasion of Ukraine, Begum was one of 11 Labour MPs threatened with loss of the party whip for signing a statement by the Stop the War Coalition which questioned the legitimacy of NATO and accused NATO of "eastward expansion". All 11 then removed their signatures.

On 7 October 2023, Begum posed with the Palestine Solidarity Campaign at their stand at the Labour Party conference in Liverpool. As the PSC had planned to protest outside the Israeli embassy following the start of the Gaza war the previous day, Begum attracted criticism from the media and faced calls for suspension from the party whip. The PSC later removed the photo from its Twitter account.

At the 2024 general election, Begum was re-elected to Parliament as MP for Poplar and Limehouse with a decreased vote share, achieving 43.1% of the vote and a majority of 12,560. Begum’s ex-husband stood against her as an independent candidate and came fourth.

On 23 July 2024, Begum confirmed that she had had the Labour Party whip withdrawn and was suspended from the party due to voting for a SNP amendment on the King's Speech to end the two-child benefit cap. Begum said that she felt bullied by Labour's whips, and that a whip stated that anti-domestic violence legislation tabled by Begum would only be supported if she did not vote for the SNP amendment. A Labour Party spokesman responded by saying the party did not recognise these claims. Begum had the whip restored in September 2025.

== Personal life ==
Begum's first language is Sylheti, which is spoken by the majority of British Bangladeshis, and she was the first to speak the language in parliament.

Begum married Ehtashamul Haque, then a member of Tower Hamlets Council, in 2013. They were divorced in 2015. In January 2020, Begum wrote in a tweet that she had suffered from domestic abuse. She went on to become chair of the All-Party Parliamentary Group on Domestic Violence and Abuse.

== Court case ==
In 2020, Begum was charged with three counts of fraud dating between 18 January 2013 and 31 March 2016, relating to the charge that she had dishonestly failed to disclose information in applying for and securing social housing. She said that she would "vigorously contest" the charges. At the trial, the prosecution presented evidence that she had applied for council properties during her marriage to Haque, which she said he did without her knowledge. Begum's barrister presented evidence about the pattern of the applications which, she argued, suggested that two different people were applying. Begum argued that she was a victim of domestic abuse, coercive control and financial abuse and, on 30 July 2021, was found not guilty on all three counts.

Parliament of the United Kingdom
| Preceded by Jim Fitzpatrick | Member of Parliament for Poplar and Limehouse; 2019–present | Incumbent |
