= Poplar and Limehouse =

UK Parliament constituency (since 2010)

Coordinates: 51.50°N 0.02°W

- Borough constituency for the House of Commons
- Interactive map of boundaries from 2024
- Location within Greater London
- County: Greater London
- Electorate: 75,814 (March 2020)
- Major settlements: Canary Wharf, Limehouse, Poplar, Wapping

Current constituency
- Created: 2010
- Member of Parliament: Apsana Begum (Labour)
- Seats: One
- Created from: Poplar and Canning Town, Bethnal Green and Bow

Poplar and Limehouse is a constituency (Note: A borough constituency (for the purposes of election expenses and type of returning officer)) which was first created in 2010. It has been represented in the House of Commons of the UK Parliament since 2019 by Apsana Begum, a Labour Party MP. (Note: As with all constituencies, the constituency elects one Member of Parliament (MP) by the first past the post system of election at least every five years.) Begum was suspended from the Parliamentary Labour Party on 23 July 2024 for voting to scrap the two-child benefit cap. She then sat as an independent, before being readmitted to Labour in September 2025.

== Constituency profile ==
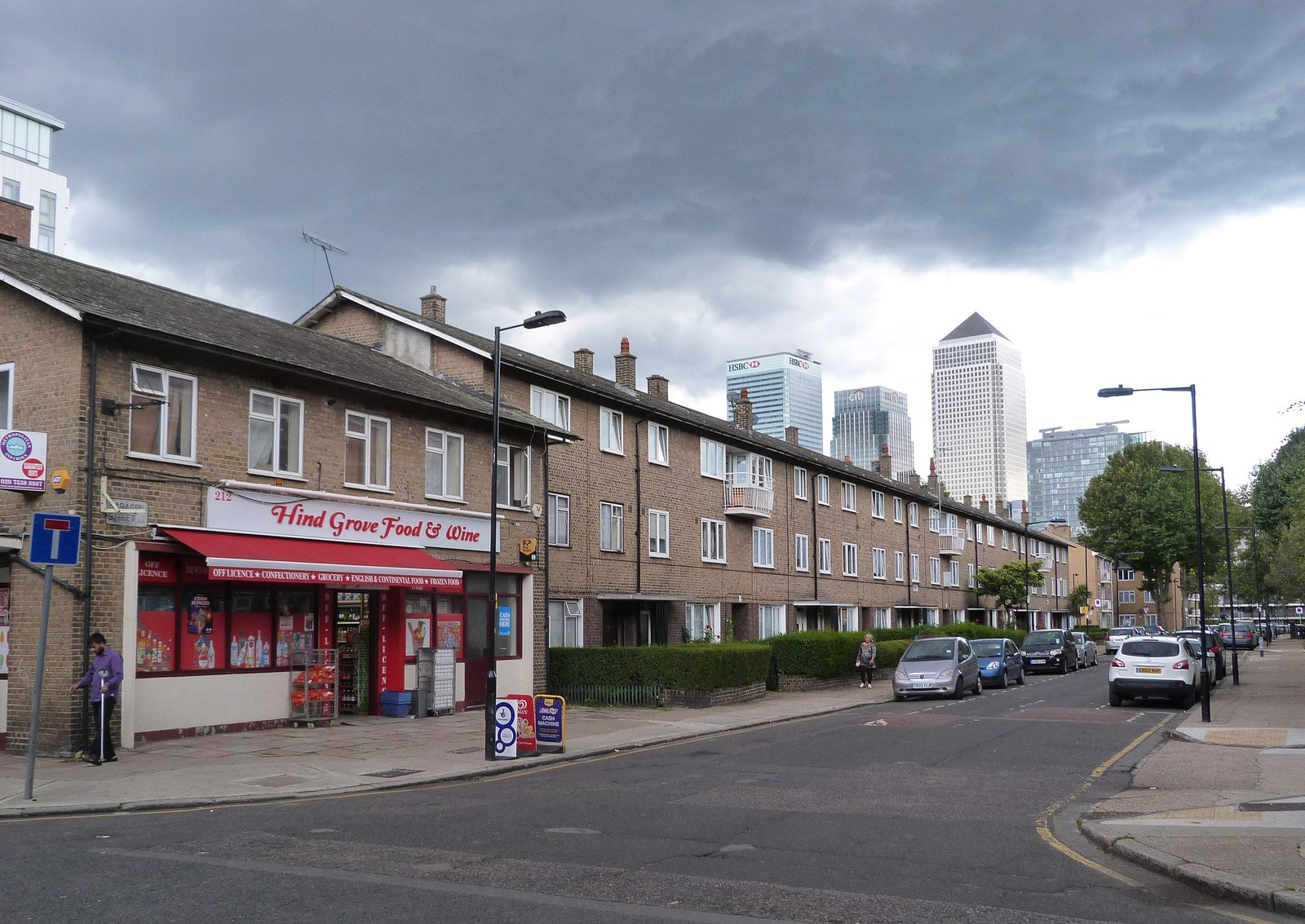
Saracen Street in Poplar with the skyscrapers of Canary Wharf in the background

Poplar and Limehouse is a constituency in Greater London in England, within the Borough of Tower Hamlets. It covers the neighbourhoods of Poplar, Limehouse, Wapping, Mile End, Canary Wharf, Millwall and Cubitt Town.

This constituency covers an inner-city area around 4 miles (6.4 km) east of the centre of London. Its position along the River Thames gave the area a maritime history with many large docks. Most of the docks and warehouses are no longer in use and have since been repurposed, most notably at Canary Wharf which began redevelopment in the 1980s and is today one of London's main financial centres with a number of skyscrapers; the district contains six of the UK's ten tallest buildings. This constituency also contains the Tower of London and the north end of Tower Bridge, two of the UK's most popular tourist attractions.

The area's importance as a maritime centre made it a target for the Luftwaffe during the Blitz of World War II. This resulted in significant post-war development including the large Lansbury council housing estate and many dense terraces and blocks of flats. There are high levels of deprivation in Poplar and Cubitt Town whilst Wapping and most of the Isle of Dogs are more affluent with many expensive apartments, giving the constituency an average level of wealth overall. House prices across the constituency are generally lower than the rest of London but considerably higher than the UK average due to the constituency's proximity to the centre of the capital.

Poplar and Limehouse has a very large young adult population and a very low proportion of retirees; only 5% of residents are over the age of 65 compared to 19% across England and Wales. Residents' household income is in line with the London average but the homeownership rate is very low. The child poverty rate is above-average. Residents are generally well-educated and a high proportion work in the finance and technology sectors. The percentage claiming unemployment benefits is high.

Poplar and Limehouse is ethnically diverse. At the 2021 census, Asians, mostly of Bangladeshi origin, were the largest ethnic group at 43%. White people made up 40% of the population, around half of whom were of non-British origin including a large Italian community. Black people made up 8% of residents.

At the local borough council, most of the constituency is represented by councillors from Aspire, a localist party. Wapping and Limehouse elected Labour Party representatives. Voters in Poplar and Limehouse strongly supported remaining in the European Union in the 2016 referendum; an estimated 65% voted to remain compared to the UK-wide figure of 48%.

== History ==
Political history

The predecessors to this constituency (area electing MPs to the House of Commons) (see history of boundaries) since 1992 have elected Labour Party representatives. In 2010, Jim Fitzpatrick had a majority of 12.9% over the runner-up Conservative Party candidate.

The 2015 re-election of Fitzpatrick made the seat the 66th safest of Labour's 232 seats by percentage of majority.

In 2019, Apsana Begum, selected to succeed the retiring Fitzpatrick as Labour's candidate, beat the runner-up Conservative Party candidate by 28,904 votes. This was more than Jim Fitzpatrick’s 27,712 vote majority at the 2017 general election, though the majority size in terms of vote share remained stable at 47.2%, and Labour's vote share declined.

At the 2024, Begum's majority declined significantly to 29.2% as votes were lost to the Green Party, whose candidate came second, and an independent candidate.

== Boundaries ==
=== 2010-2024 ===
Map of boundaries 2010-2024

Parliament accepted the Boundary Commission's Fifth Periodic Review of Westminster constituencies which proposed the seat's creation for the 2010 general election, since when it has consisted of the following electoral wards:

- Blackwall and Cubitt Town, Bromley-by-Bow, East India and Lansbury, Limehouse, Mile End East, Millwall, St Katharine’s and Wapping, and Shadwell within the London Borough of Tower Hamlets

=== History of boundaries ===
- Before 2010, this constituency would map into all but the north-east of the old Poplar and Canning Town constituency, plus the western end of Shadwell Ward and in the west the whole of St Katharine's & Wapping Ward, formerly parts of Bethnal Green and Bow.
  - The areas of the old constituency that were in the London Borough of Newham were removed and transferred to East Ham (5.1% of Poplar and Canning Town) and West Ham (24.9%).

Nomenclature

Alternative names, including "Tower Hamlets South" and "Poplar and Millwall" were rejected following public consultation.

Local authority boundary review

Following a review of ward boundaries in Tower Hamlets which became effective in May 2014, the contents (but not the boundaries) of the constituency were changed to:

- The London Borough of Tower Hamlets wards of Blackwall and Cubitt Town, Bromley North, Bromley South, Canary Wharf, Island Gardens, Lansbury, Limehouse, Mile End, Poplar, St Katharine's and Wapping, and Shadwell; and a small part of Whitechapel ward.

=== Current ===
Further to the 2023 review of Westminster constituencies, which came into effect for the 2024 general election, the composition of the constituency was reduced to bring the electorate within the permitted range. Shadwell ward and the part of the Whitechapel ward were transferred to the re-established seat of Bethnal Green and Stepney, and the Bromley North ward was moved to the newly created constituency of Stratford and Bow.

== Members of Parliament ==
Election	Member	Party
2010	Jim Fitzpatrick	Labour
2019	Apsana Begum	Labour
2024	Apsana Begum	Independent
2025	Apsana Begum	Labour

== Elections ==
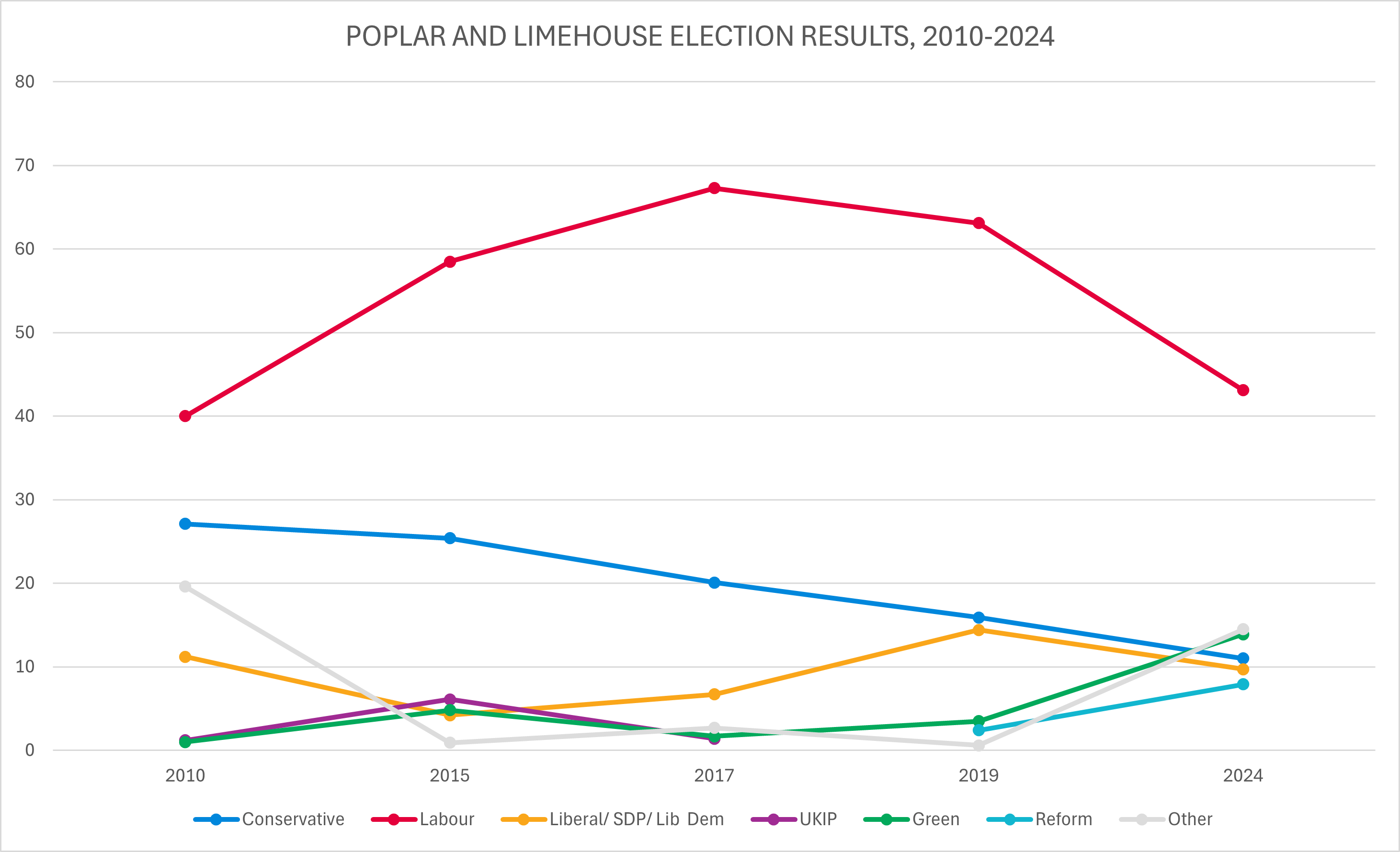
Election results 2010-2024

=== Elections in the 2020s ===
General election 2024: Poplar and Limehouse
Party	Candidate	Votes	%	±%
Labour	Apsana Begum	18,535	43.1	–17.2
Green	Nathalie Bienfait	5,975	13.9	+10.5
Conservative	Freddie Downing	4,738	11.0	–6.7
Independent	Ehtashamul Haque	4,554	10.6	N/A
Liberal Democrats	Richard Flowers	4,189	9.7	–5.8
Reform	Tony Glover	3,403	7.9	+5.5
Workers Party	Kamran Khan	1,463	3.4	N/A
SDP	Manny Lawal	194	0.5	N/A
Majority		12,560	29.2	–13.5
Turnout		43,051	51.2	–16.9
Registered electors		84,116		
Labour hold		Swing	–13.9	

=== Elections in the 2010s ===
2019 notional result
Party	Vote	%
Labour	31,176	60.3
Conservative	9,129	17.7
Liberal Democrats	8,009	15.5
Green	1,756	3.4
Brexit Party	1,219	2.4
Others	376	0.7
Turnout	51,665	68.1
Electorate	75,814	

General election 2019: Poplar and Limehouse
Party	Candidate	Votes	%	±%
Labour	Apsana Begum	38,660	63.1	−4.2
Conservative	Sheun Oke	9,756	15.9	−4.2
Liberal Democrats	Andrew Cregan	8,832	14.4	+7.7
Green	Neil Jameson	2,159	3.5	+1.8
Brexit Party	Catherine Cui	1,493	2.4	N/A
Independent	Andy Erlam	376	0.6	N/A
Majority		28,904	47.2	0.0
Turnout		61,276	66.7	−0.6
Registered electors		91,836		
Labour hold		Swing	0.0	

General election 2017: Poplar and Limehouse
Party	Candidate	Votes	%	±%
Labour	Jim Fitzpatrick	39,558	67.3	+8.7
Conservative	Chris Wilford	11,846	20.1	−5.3
Liberal Democrats	Elaine Bagshaw	3,959	6.7	+2.5
Independent	Oliur Rahman	1,477	2.5	N/A
Green	Bethan Lant	989	1.7	−3.1
UKIP	Nicholas McQueen	849	1.4	−4.7
Independent	David Barker	136	0.2	N/A
Majority		27,712	47.2	+14.0
Turnout		58,814	67.3	+5.2
Registered electors		87,331		
Labour hold		Swing	+7.0	

General election 2015: Poplar and Limehouse
Party	Candidate	Votes	%	±%
Labour	Jim Fitzpatrick	29,886	58.5	+18.6
Conservative	Chris Wilford	12,962	25.4	−1.7
UKIP	Nicholas McQueen	3,128	6.1	+4.9
Green	Maureen Childs	2,463	4.8	+3.9
Liberal Democrats	Elaine Bagshaw	2,149	4.2	−6.9
TUSC	Hugo Pierre	367	0.7	N/A
Red Flag Anti-Corruption	Rene Claudel Mugenzi	89	0.2	N/A
Majority		16,924	33.2	+20.2
Turnout		51,044	62.2	−0.1
Registered electors		82,081		
Labour hold		Swing	+10.1	

General election 2010: Poplar and Limehouse
Party	Candidate	Votes	%	±%
Labour	Jim Fitzpatrick*	18,679	40.0	+4.7
Conservative	Tim Archer	12,649	27.1	+2.6
Respect	George Galloway*	8,160	17.5	−0.7
Liberal Democrats	Jonathan Fryer	5,209	11.2	−2.8
UKIP	Wayne Lochner	565	1.2	N/A
English Democrat	Andrew Osborne	470	1.0	N/A
Green	Chris Smith	449	1.0	−1.7
Independent	Kabir Mahmud	293	0.6	N/A
Independent	Mohammed Hoque	167	0.4	N/A
Independent	Jim Thornton	59	0.1	N/A
Majority		6,030	12.9	
Turnout		46,700	62.3	
Registered electors		74,955		
Labour win (new seat)				

* Served as an MP in the 2005–2010 Parliament

== See also ==
- parliamentary constituencies in London
