= Ian Mikardo =

British Labour Member of Parliament (1908–1993)

- Mikardo in 1967

Member of Parliament for Bow and Poplar Bethnal Green and Bow (1974–1983) Poplar (1964–1974)
- In office 15 October 1964 – 18 May 1987
- Preceded by: Charles Key
- Succeeded by: Mildred Gordon

Member of Parliament for Reading Reading South (1950–1955)
- In office 5 July 1945 – 18 September 1959
- Preceded by: Alfred Bakewell Howitt
- Succeeded by: Peter Emery

Personal details
- Born: 9 July 1908 Portsmouth, Hampshire, England
- Died: 6 May 1993 (aged 84) Stockport, Greater Manchester, England
- Party: Labour; Co-operative
- Spouse: Mary Rosetsky (1907–1994)
- Children: 2
- Nickname: Mik

Ian Mikardo (9 July 1908 – 6 May 1993), commonly known as Mik, was a British Labour Member of Parliament. An ardent socialist and a Zionist, he remained a backbencher throughout his four decades in the House of Commons. He was a member of National Executive Committee of the Labour Party in 1950–1959 and 1960–1978, and Chairman of the Labour Party in 1970–1971. He was also chairman of the International Committee of the Labour Party in 1973–1978, vice-president of the Socialist International (1978–1983) and honorary president (1983–1993).

Mikardo was a Labour Member of Parliament for Reading 1945–1950, Reading South 1950–1955, Reading 1955–1959, Poplar 1964–1974, Bethnal Green and Bow 1974–1983 and Bow and Poplar 1983–1987. He was Chairman of the House of Commons Select Committee on Nationalised Industries, 1966–1970. He issued many pamphlets; the most famous were Keep Left (1947) and Keeping Left with Dick Crossman, Michael Foot and Jo Richardson, 1950. He was also a Fabian essayist, a staunch friend of Israel, as well as friend and mentor to many in the Labour movement, where he made a great impact.

== Early life and family ==
His parents were Jewish refugees from the Tsarist Empire. His mother, Bluma (died 1961, Hampshire) came from a town called Yampil, Vinnytsia Oblast in Central Ukraine. His father, Moshe ("Morris"; died 1940, Hampshire) came from Kutno, a textile-manufacturing town west of Warsaw. They came to the East End of London separately around 1900 and married some years later. They worked as tailors and in 1907 moved to Portsmouth where they were employed repairing uniforms for the Royal Navy. Mikardo was born there in 1908. He had two brothers, Sidney Mikardo (1915-1999) and Norman Mikardo. His brother (Neville) Norman Mikardo (1924–2004), a mechanical engineer, was a Labour Party councillor for Tokyngton Ward of Brent South, from 1978–82. His niece Barbara Tayler (1931–2011) was a publisher, writer and political activist. Mikardo became a surrogate father to her after her father died when she was two years old.

When he began school-aged three, his lack of English words made him the butt of jokes. His parents spoke Yiddish. He attended The Old Beneficiary School known as "The Old Benny", in Portsea, Portsmouth, and the Omega Street School in Portsmouth. In 1919, he came top in Portsmouth's pass-list for the 11-plus, and went to Portsmouth Southern Grammar School for Boys. From the age of eleven he also attended Aria College, a rabbinical seminary. However the life of a cleric was not for him and he transferred to Portsmouth Grammar School. At this time he followed Portsmouth FC and he had an encyclopedic knowledge of all their matches.

Concerned by injustice and inequality from boyhood, Mikardo was influenced by the works of R. H. Tawney and George Bernard Shaw in his teens. He attended political lectures at various clubs and societies in London in the 1920s, principally amongst the Jewish community. He joined both the Labour Party and Poale Zion, the Zionist workers' movement affiliated to the Labour Party. He was already a Zionist, and had given his first public speech at a meeting of the Portsmouth Zionist Society in 1922, aged 13.

After leaving school, Mikardo settled in Stepney, where he had a variety of jobs. In 1930 he met Mary (b. 1907), the daughter of Benjamin Rosetsky. They married at Mile End and Bow District synagogue on 3 January 1932, and Mary joined the Labour Party and Poale Zion. They had two daughters by 1936. Mary suffered a heart attack in 1959 which was progressively disabling. She died in Cheshire in 1994, a few months after him.

He studied scientific management, but was sceptical and developed his own theories. He became a freelance management consultant and during the Second World War, worked on increasing efficiency in aircraft and armaments manufacturing, principally at Woodley Aerodrome in Reading. He was treasurer of the World Airways Joint Committee of National Air Communications.

== Parliament and the Labour Party ==
After settling in Reading at the end of the war he was selected by the local Constituency Labour Party for the 1945 general election, beating James Callaghan and Austen Albu. On every topic, the National Health Service, education, social deprivation, nationalisation or socialism, he was seen as an inspiration to others. Mik, as he introduced himself, showed he had planned where he was going and the constituency members wanted to go with him. His integrity was obvious and beguiling, quite rare amongst professional politicians.

He was elected Member of Parliament for Reading constituency overturning a large Conservative majority. Labour's effective get out the vote campaign used in this election was universally adopted and came to be known as the Reading system. He held Reading, which became a highly marginal seat, until the 1959 general election when he was ousted by Peter Emery of the Association of Supervisory Staffs, Executives and Technicians, later the Association of Scientific, Technical and Managerial Staffs and Manufacturing Science and Finance trade union. Ian Mikardo Way, a road in Lower Caversham, Reading, commemorates his role as the town's MP.

Mikardo was a member of the left wing of the Labour Party throughout his political career, writing for Tribune. In the post-war period, the Fabian Society was at the heart of Labour and social democratic thinking, and Mikardo contributed to the New Fabian Essays of 1952, edited by Anthony Crosland. These helped to reinvigorate the debate on the left after the fall of the Attlee government. Other contributors included Roy Jenkins, Richard Crossman and Denis Healey.

Mikardo's secretary at the time was Jo Richardson (1923–94) who began her political career working for him and later became a Member of Parliament herself. She co-ordinated the 'Keep Left Group' and went on to become the secretary of the Tribune Group. In 1951 Richardson was elected to Hornsey Borough Council and became the full-time secretary and working partner of Mikardo in his business, which involved trade with eastern Europe. In February 1958 Mikardo joined Stephen Swingler, Richardson, Harold Davies, Konni Zilliacus, Walter Monslow and Sydney Silverman, to form Victory for Socialism (VFS), which was co-ordinated by Richardson.

Mikardo was defeated in his Reading seat in 1959 but won Poplar in the General Election of 1964, representing the area of London where his parents had first settled. As the constituencies were reorganised over time, he went on to represent Bethnal Green and Bow from 1974 until 1983 and the Bow and Poplar from 1983 until his retirement from Parliament in 1987. Mikardo served as a member of the National Executive Committee of the Labour Party from 1950–59 and 1960–78. He was also chairman of the Select Committee on Nationalised Industries 1966–70 and Chairman of the Labour Party 1970–71.

In February 1973 Mikardo joined James Callaghan, Shadow Foreign Secretary, and Tom McNally, Secretary, International Department in an official Labour Party delegation visiting the Far East. On 27 March 1974 Mikardo, having already served as Chairman of the Labour Party, was elected chairman of the Parliamentary Labour Party, defeating a candidate from the right of the party, Arthur Bottomley, by 99–85 votes. A necessarily anonymous and discerning experienced clerk of the House of Commons remarked 'Ian Mikardo was simply the most skillful operator in committee that any of us ever saw.' Within Parliament, he was known as the Commons' bookmaker, willing to take bets on all manner of political events.

In 1981, he was made chairman of the anti-nuclear Labour Party Defence Study Group.

== Keep Left and Keeping Left ==
In early 1947 a small number of the 'King's Speech dissenters' in the Labour Party formed the 'Keep Left' group and met on a regular basis during that year. Along with Richard Crossman, Michael Foot and Konni Zilliacus, Mikardo published a pamphlet of the same name in May 1947 in which the authors criticized the United States cold war policies and urged a closer relationship with Europe in order to create a "Third Force" in politics. This included the idea of nuclear disarmament and the formation of a European Security Treaty. During the period of office of Clement Attlee's Labour government, the Keep Left group attempted, through discussion and pamphlets, to produce practical proposals informed by socialist values. The group survived until April 1951. After that month's ministerial resignations it became one element within the much larger Bevanite faction.

Keep Left's concern was with modernisation and socialist ethics. This was evident in Harold Wilson's governments in the 1960s. Such sentiments contributed to ministerial conflicts with the trade unions over incomes policy and most thoroughly over Barbara Castle's proposals for trade union reform. The vision of a more rational and ethical society discussed by a group of talented young politicians two decades earlier was at odds with sentiments deeply rooted in their party.

== Mikardo Committee on the Docks ==
The Mikardo Committee on the docks was set up by the Labour Party. Mikardo served on it, along with Andrew Cunningham, leader of the General, Municipal, Boilermakers and Allied Trade Union (GMB) in north-east England, John Hughes, of Ruskin College, Oxford, Jack Jones, later general secretary of the Transport and General Workers Union then directly responsible for dockers, Michael Montague, later of the English Tourist Board, and Peter Shore MP.

A report in March 1965 exposed the problems of the docks industry. It recommended total restructuring of the docks under public ownership and with a system of decentralisation and workers' participation in management wider than for any other industry. The 1966 Labour Cabinet accepted the report. George Brown fought hard for it against ministerial resistance. However, the Labour government was unable to produce the Ports Bill until the last session of that parliament. The Bill when it came was a disappointment it was a long way short of implementing the proposals. Had the committee's proposals been put into practice, the seamen's strike and its crippling effect on the economy might have been avoided. Sourness was created in the Labour movement by suggestions of 'Reds under the bed'. It created the conditions for Labour's defeat in 1970.

== Reselection of MPs ==
During the debates about reselection of MPs in the Labour Party in the late 1970s, he put forward the "Mikardo position", an attempted compromise which was adopted by the Labour Party conference in 1978. However this was overturned at the 1979 conference, which adopted full mandatory reselection of MPs.

== The Belgrano Enquiry - Parliamentary Select Committee ==
Mikardo outlined in the House of Commons attempts by some members of the Parliamentary Select Committee, of which he was a member, to find the truth about the sinking of General Belgrano during the Falklands War.

The Foreign Affairs Select Committee's minority report was published in 1984. Mikardo complained that dogmatic views were being expressed. He stated that he had spent months going through all the evidence, but still could not make up his mind about the truth. He complained that other members who had not looked at all the evidence could not be so sure and dogmatic. He complained that information was being withheld and this would devalue its work and its report. Mikardo accused the government of lying to the House, to the Select Committee and to the country. This followed revelations from the trial of Clive Ponting. He also stated that a civil servant had advised Ministers to deceive the Select Committee by withholding information. Mikardo quoted one of the reasons given for withholding, namely that the rules of engagement would have to be paraphrased considerably or they would be almost incomprehensible to the layman. Mikardo stated that the rules had been given to the War Cabinet whose members were all laymen and the rules had been fully understood by them. The Secretary of State subsequently agreed that it was nonsense and he had now given the rules to the Select Committee.

Mikardo stated that a number of people had said that they could not understand why the Government had prosecuted Clive Ponting (who had been acquitted). Mikardo stated that the government's lying to the House of Commons was in the national interest. He stated that they wanted to protect themselves against criticism from the Select Committee, and others, and to be able to say that, however reprehensible, it was done in the national interest. Mikardo stated that the acquittal of Ponting got rid of that. Twelve British citizens had dismissed the judge's opinion, shared by the prime minister and some of her ministers, that the national interest is whatever the government of the day want to do. Mikardo stated: "That is a monstrous doctrine because it confers on a Government a cachet of papal infallibility. I do not doubt that all Governments do what they judge to be in the national interest, but no Government have the right to assume that their judgment can never be wrong. No Government should assume that they can never be wrong and that what they do cannot sometimes, therefore, vary from the national interest. As has been said, that is the cherished doctrine of General Pinochet and of General Jaruzelski. It is the codex of all courts in police states. Before the time of our present Prime Minister and Mr Justice McCowan, that doctrine was unheard of in our country."

John Browne (MP for Winchester) asked: "What greater test can any Government face than to fight a military campaign and have a disloyal adviser in a key area of defence? I am reminded of the betrayal of the Spartans at Thermopylae to the Persians. In what other country would the Government have to balance disclosure against national security in such a blaze of examination, comment and publicity?"

Mikardo responded: "The United States."

Browne: "No, not the President."

Mikardo: "Yes." (Sinking of the General Belgrano, Hansard, 18 February 1985) See also: ARA General Belgrano: Controversy over the sinking

== Poale Zion of Britain and the Zionist Federation of Great Britain and Ireland ==
Mikardo and his wife were immersed in Jewish causes and help for Israel, which they often visited. He worked with Mapam, the Israeli United Workers' Party, and abhorred gratuitous provocation of the Palestinian Arabs. Instances include:

- 7 March 1948: At the opening of the annual conference of the Poale Zion of Great Britain, Mikardo revealed that a vote of "no-confidence" would be sought against the government by some members of the British Labour Party when the bill to terminate the Palestine Mandate had its second reading in the House of Commons.
- 21 July 1950: Mikardo asked in Parliament that the British Government's policy on providing arms to Egypt be revised. Mikardo pointed out that arms shipments to Egypt were premised on their use in collective defence and that Egypt had made it very clear that it would not join the collective effort on Korea. Kenneth Younger, the government spokesman on foreign affairs, declared that the government was not contemplating changing its policy of supplying arms to Egypt.
- 16 January 1951: Mikardo commented on an article he had written which included a suggestion for Britain to have a military base in Israel.
- 11 July 1952: Labour Party leaders praised the courage and enthusiasm of the new State of Israel and said that it would overcome the great odds which it faces. They were speaking at a reception given by Labour MPs in honour of a Histadrut delegation of 62 American and Canadian Jews en route to Israel. They stressed the close relations between the Israeli and British Labour movements. Speakers included Arthur Greenwood, treasurer of the British Labour Party, Glenville Hall, chairman of its Parliamentary caucus, Alice Bacon, former party chair and Ian Mikardo.
- 1953: Mikardo questioned Prime Minister Sir Winston Churchill on anti-Jewish discrimination at the Mid Ocean Club in Bermuda.

== Books, journals, pamphlets, and articles ==
- Centralised Control of Industry, pamphlet, 1944 Advocating the extension into peacetime of wartime control of industry
- Keep Left (1947), Keeping Left (1950) Group of members of parliament, Michael Foot, Ian Mikardo, Richard Crossman
- The Problems of Nationalization (Current affairs) (1948)
- The Second Five Years – Pamphlet, 1948 Sets out a radical programme for the second post-war Labour Administration.
- Consultation or joint management? book, 1949, contribution to the discussion of industrial democracy by J M Chalmers, Mikardo, G D H Cole
- Tribune No 723 January 12–25, 1951, Mikardo, Michael Foot, Evelyn Anderson. Ronald Searle
- It's a Mugs Game, Pamphlet, 1951 The bookmaker's trade.
- It Need Not Happen, The Alternative to German Rearmament Barbara Castle, Richard Crossman, Tom Driberg, Mikardo, Harold Wilson, Aneurin Bevan, book 1951
- The Immigration Story - What we are doing in Israel, Mikardo, 1953
- Electioneering in Labour marginal constituencies, Mikardo, 1955
- The Labour case Choice for Britain series, paperback, 1950, Herbert Morrison, Mikardo (author)
- Labour: party or puppet? Frank Allaun, Mikardo, Jim Sillars, book 1972
- New Fabian Essays by Ed. R H S Crossman
- Esprit, 1952. Contient entre autres : Il est temps encore, par l'equipe de Esprit. Sur la route vietnamienne, par Paul Mus. L'Experience Travailliste :Socialisme et travaillisme, par François Sellier. Necessites economiques, Mikardo et al.
- La Tribune des Peuples, No 4 1953. Contient entre autres : Il faut gagner la paix, par Aneurin Bevan (13p) Réflexions sur la décadence du capitalisme français, par Alfred Sauvy (14p) Le dilemme du Parti travailliste anglais, K. Martin, Mikardo et al.
- Private Eye No.321: 5 April 1974 Article
- Sense about defence: the report of the Labour Party Defence Study Group
- Back-bencher - Ian Mikardo, Book, 1988 (Autobiography)
- Docklands Redevelopment: How They Got It Wrong, Ian Mikardo, 1990

== Death ==
Mikardo died, age 84, on 6 May 1993 from a stroke, whilst being treated for sarcoma and chronic obstructive pulmonary disease at Stepping Hill Hospital, Stockport, Cheshire. He was survived by his wife Mary and daughters Ruth and Judy.

Ian Mikardo High School in Bow is named after him.

Ian Mikardo Way, Caversham, Reading is named after him.

== See also ==
- British responses to the anti-Jewish pogroms in the Russian Empire

Parliament of the United Kingdom
Preceded by Alfred Bakewell Howitt	Member of Parliament for Reading; 1945–1950	Constituency abolished
New constituency	Member of Parliament for Reading South; 1950–1955	Constituency abolished
New constituency	Member of Parliament for Reading; 1955–1959	Succeeded by Peter Emery
Preceded by Charles Key	Member of Parliament for Poplar; 1964 – Feb 1974	Constituency abolished
New constituency	Member of Parliament for Bethnal Green and Bow; Feb 1974 – 1983	Constituency abolished
New constituency	Member of Parliament for Bow and Poplar; 1983–1987	Succeeded by Mildred Gordon
Party political offices
Preceded by Emil Davies	Treasurer of the Fabian Society; 1947–1950	Succeeded by Jack Diamond
Preceded by Douglas Houghton	Chair of the Parliamentary Labour Party; 1970–1971	Succeeded by Cledwyn Hughes
Preceded by Arthur Skeffington	Chair of the Labour Party NEC; 1970–1971	Succeeded by Tony Benn
Trade union offices
Preceded by Union founded	President of the Association of Scientific, Technical and Managerial Staffs; 1969–1973	Succeeded by Len Wells
