= Poplar and Canning Town =

UK Parliament constituency (1997–2010)

Coordinates: 51.515°N 0.000°E

- Former borough constituency for the House of Commons
- Boundary of Poplar and Canning Town in Greater London for the 2005 general election
- County: Greater London

1997–2010
- Seats: One
- Created from: Bow and Poplar, Newham South
- Replaced by: Poplar and Limehouse, West Ham

Poplar and Canning Town was a borough constituency represented in the House of Commons of the Parliament of the United Kingdom. It elected one Member of Parliament (MP) by using the first past the post system of election.

== History ==
The constituency was created in the 1997 general election from the constituencies of Bow and Poplar and Newham South, and was divided at the 2010 general election between the realigned seat of Poplar and Limehouse and the neighbouring West Ham seat. It was held by the Labour Party for the entire period of its existence.

== Boundaries ==
As the constituency's name suggested, it covered Poplar and Canning Town, as well as Limehouse and the Isle of Dogs. The breakdown of wards was:

- London Borough of Newham: Beckton, Canning Town and Grange, Custom House and Silvertown, Ordnance.
- London Borough of Tower Hamlets: Blackwall, Bromley, East India, Lansbury, Limehouse, Millwall, Shadwell.

=== Boundary review ===
Following their review of parliamentary representation in North London, the Boundary Commission for England recommended the creation of an altered Poplar and Limehouse seat, to be fought at the 2010 general election.

== Members of Parliament ==
| Election | Member | Party |
|---|---|---|
| 1997 | Jim Fitzpatrick | Labour |
| 2010 | Constituency abolished: see Poplar and Limehouse | |

== Elections ==
=== Elections in the 1990s ===
General election 1997: Poplar and Canning Town
| Party | Candidate | Votes | % | ±% |
|---|---|---|---|---|
| Labour | Jim Fitzpatrick | 24,807 | 63.2 | |
| Conservative | Bene't Steinberg | 5,892 | 15.0 | |
| Liberal Democrats | Janet Ludlow | 4,072 | 10.4 | |
| BNP | John Tyndall | 2,849 | 7.3 | |
| Referendum | Ian Hare | 1,091 | 2.8 | |
| Socialist Labour | Jacklyn Joseph | 551 | 1.4 | |
| Majority | | 18,915 | 48.2 | |
| Turnout | | 39,262 | 58.5 | |
| Labour hold | | Swing | +13.6 | |

=== Elections in the 2000s ===
General election 2001: Poplar and Canning Town
| Party | Candidate | Votes | % | ±% |
|---|---|---|---|---|
| Labour | Jim Fitzpatrick | 20,866 | 61.2 | −2.0 |
| Conservative | Robert Marr | 6,758 | 19.8 | +4.8 |
| Liberal Democrats | Alexi Sugden | 3,795 | 11.1 | +0.7 |
| BNP | Paul Borg | 1,733 | 5.1 | −2.2 |
| Socialist Alliance | Kambiz Boomla | 950 | 2.8 | New |
| Majority | | 14,108 | 41.4 | −6.8 |
| Turnout | | 34,102 | 44.9 | −13.6 |
| Labour hold | | Swing | | |

General election 2005: Poplar and Canning Town
| Party | Candidate | Votes | % | ±% |
|---|---|---|---|---|
| Labour | Jim Fitzpatrick | 15,628 | 40.1 | −21.1 |
| Conservative | Tim Archer | 8,499 | 21.8 | +2.0 |
| Respect | Oliur Rahman | 6,573 | 16.8 | New |
| Liberal Democrats | Janet Ludlow | 5,420 | 13.9 | +2.8 |
| Green | Terry McGrenera | 955 | 2.4 | New |
| Independent | Md. Aminul Hoque | 815 | 2.1 | New |
| Veritas | Tony Smith | 650 | 1.7 | New |
| CPA | Simeon Ademolake | 470 | 1.2 | New |
| Majority | | 7,129 | 18.7 | −22.7 |
| Turnout | | 39,010 | 47.8 | +2.9 |
| Labour hold | | Swing | −11.4 | |
