= Bethnal Green and Bow =

UK Parliament constituency (1974–1983, 1997–2024)

- Former borough constituency for the House of Commons
- Boundary of Bethnal Green and Bow in Greater London
- County: Greater London
- Population: 125,351 (2011 census)
- Electorate: 79,581 (December 2010)

1997–2024
- Seats: One
- Created from: Bethnal Green and Stepney
- Replaced by: Bethnal Green and Stepney, Stratford and Bow

1974–1983
- Seats: One
- Created from: Bethnal Green
- Replaced by: Bethnal Green & Stepney and Bow & Poplar

Bethnal Green and Bow was a constituency (Note: A borough constituency (for the purposes of election expenses and type of returning officer)) in Greater London, represented in the House of Commons of the UK Parliament from 2010 until its abolition for the 2024 general election by Rushanara Ali of the Labour Party. (Note: As with all constituencies, the constituency elects one Member of Parliament (MP) by the first past the post system of election at least every five years.)

Under the 2023 periodic review of Westminster constituencies, the majority of the constituency was incorporated into the re-established seat of Bethnal Green and Stepney, with Bow being included in the newly created constituency of Stratford and Bow.

== Boundaries ==
Map of boundaries 2014-2024

Following a review of ward boundaries in Tower Hamlets which became effective in May 2014, the contents (but not the boundaries) of the constituency were changed to:

- Weavers, Spitalfields and Banglatown, Whitechapel, St. Peter's, Bethnal Green, Stepney Green, St. Dunstan's, Bow West, Bow East.

=== History of boundaries ===
The 1974–83 constituency comprised the then London Borough of Tower Hamlets wards of Bethnal Green Central, Bethnal Green East, Bethnal Green North, Bethnal Green South, Bethnal Green West, Bow North, Bow South, Bromley, Holy Trinity, and Spitalfields.

Between the 1983 and 1997 general elections, the equivalent seat was Bethnal Green and Stepney.

The Tower Hamlets wards of Blackwall and Cubitt Town, Bromley-by-Bow, East India and Lansbury, Limehouse, Mile End East, Millwall, St Katherine's, Wapping, and Shadwell were before 2010 under the national Boundary Commission for England review which identified a need for London representation changes based on electorate estimates moved to the new constituency of Poplar and Limehouse. In this review a name change to "Tower Hamlets North" was publicly consulted on and rejected.

From 2010 to 2014, the seat had electoral wards:

- Bethnal Green North, Bethnal Green South, Bow East, Bow West, Mile End and Globe Town, St Dunstan's and Stepney Green, Spitalfields including Brick Lane, Weavers, and Whitechapel in the London Borough of Tower Hamlets

== Constituency profile ==
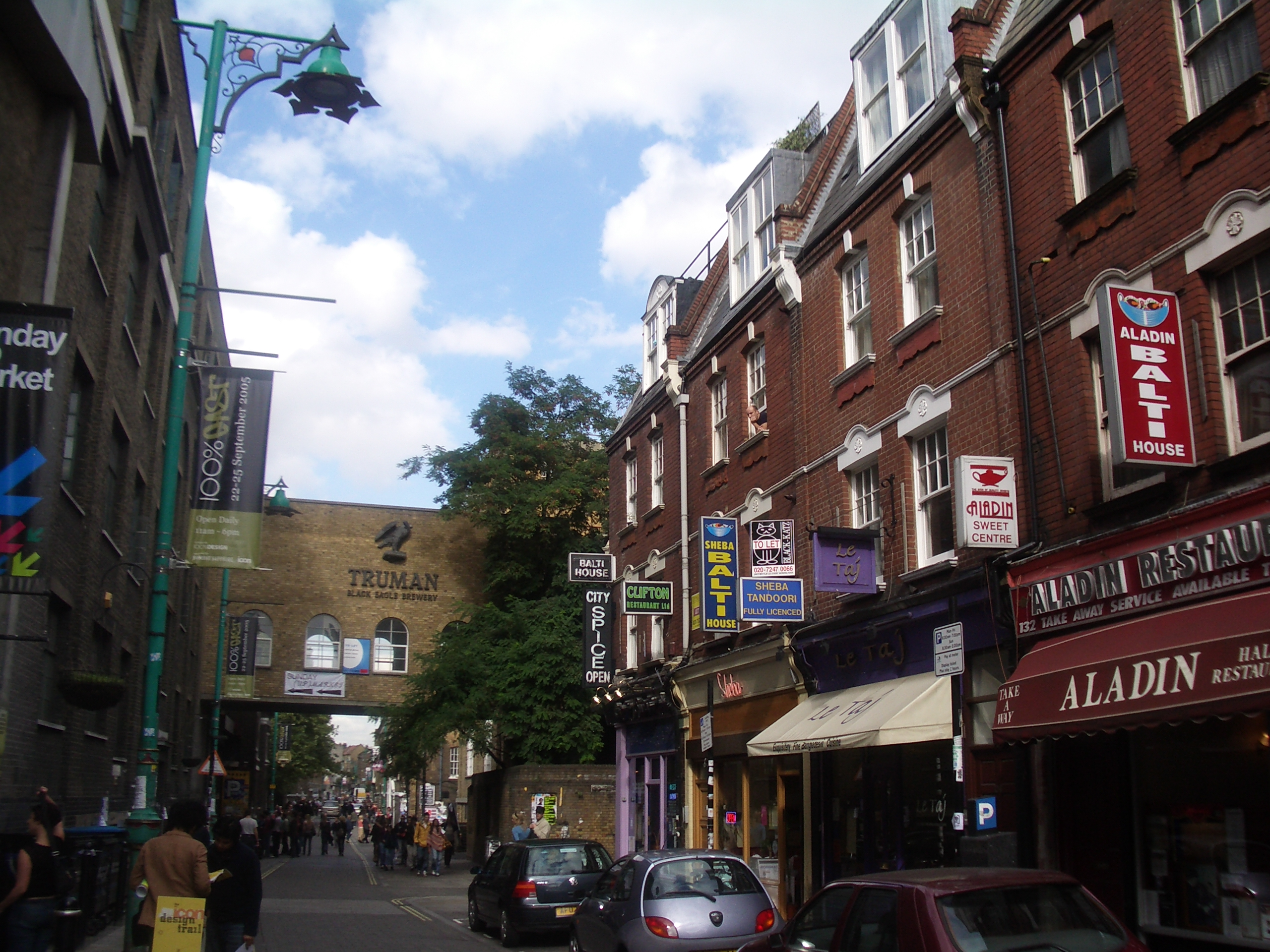
Brick Lane, Spitalfields.

The seat was centred on the northern part of the London Borough of Tower Hamlets. It included much of the traditional East End. The seat has a large Muslim community – one of the largest proportion of Muslim voters in the country. Whereas the seat has many small conservation areas, it measures overall as among the poorest by income in London and is one of the most ethnically diverse, there is no majority ethnic group — large ethnic groups are British Bangladeshi, White British, other White European and Black British.

Workless claimants who were registered jobseekers were in November 2012 higher than the national average of 3.8%, at 6% of the population based on a statistical compilation by The Guardian.

== History ==
=== Political history ===
Bethnal Green and Bow is, based on results in local and national elections, traditionally a very safe Labour seat, its predecessor seats being held by Labour since prior to World War II. However, the 2005 Respect victory in this constituency bucked that trend when the electorate voted for expelled Labour MP, George Galloway, generally considered to be far-left, who mounted a campaign focussed on two seats (see Poplar and Shoreditch and see, as to council representation, the London Borough of Tower Hamlets).

=== 1970s–1994 ===
In 1974 the Bethnal Green constituency was abolished. A new seat was created with the strict official name of Tower Hamlets, Bethnal Green and Bow. However the London Borough prefix is not commonly used for seats in the 1974–1983 redistribution.

The 1974–1983 constituency was a safe Labour seat, with the Liberal Party in a distant second place. Ian Mikardo, a well known back bench Labour MP, represented the area in this period.

Between 1983 and 1997, most of the present constituency formed the seat of Bethnal Green and Stepney.

The borough of Tower Hamlets has a reputation for being a bastion of radical politics, historically with a minority of Communists on its council and more recently with Respect forming the largest opponents to the quite frequent large Labour majorities on the council level. Before a recent revival, the Conservative Party were absent from the council from 1931 until 2006 – and all of its revival has been in the two riverside wards which does not apply to any of this seat. The Liberal Party remained the main challengers to Labour in the Bethnal Green area but the loss of Percy Harris as Bethnal Green South West MP and eventually as London County Councillor too (despite a temporary comeback in 1946) put them out of the running in Parliamentary elections until a Liberal revival began in Bow in the late 1970s. Tower Hamlets was the only London Borough to have had seats held by the Communist Party of Great Britain; they lost their last seats in 1971. Between 1945 and 1950, Mile End provided the CPGB with one of its two parliamentary seats, being represented by Phil Piratin. Two Communists also won seats on the London County council (LCC) in 1947.

Between 1986 and 1994, the Liberal Democrats controlled Tower Hamlets London Borough Council, this proved a successful but controversial period. The delivery of major infrastructure projects, including many schools and school housing projects, was balanced by alleged corruption.

=== 1997–2010 ===
At the 1997 general election, there was a swing of 5% to the Conservative Party at a time when the national trend was a landslide swing against them. Bethnal Green and Bow was one of only two Labour-held constituencies to have any sort of pro-Conservative swing. Broadsheets and local newspapers ascribed this unusual result to problems over the selection of a Labour candidate, following the retirement of Peter Shore. Oona King, who won the selection, was not well known and many in the local area would have preferred a candidate from a Bangladeshi background. However the leading Bangladeshi candidates in the local Labour Party were excluded from the selection. The only other constituency to have a pro-Conservative swing was Bradford West, who similarly had selected a Sikh rather than a Muslim candidate.

Following British participation in the 2003 invasion of Iraq, an action deeply unpopular with the Muslim community in the constituency but nevertheless supported by King, the newly formed Respect Party gained support. They topped the poll in Tower Hamlets in the 2004 European Parliamentary elections and subsequently won their first local council seat at a by-election. In the 2005 general election, the seat was a narrow victory for ex-Labour MP George Galloway, one of Respect's leading figures. Respect also won seats at the 2006 local council elections although its performance was not as strong as many observers believed it could have been.

Galloway attracted criticism for lack of attendance at Parliament, especially when he appeared on Celebrity Big Brother. He said that he had not missed any crucial votes, and that the best way for him to advance the interests of his constituents was by general campaigning. Galloway had always said that he only intended to stay in the seat for one parliament, and in 2010 stood for the neighbouring constituency of Poplar and Limehouse. However, he lost to the Labour incumbent Jim Fitzpatrick.

=== 2010 general election ===
In September 2007, the Respect Party selected Abjol Miah, the leader of the Respect Group on Tower Hamlets Council, as their candidate to replace George Galloway in Bethnal Green and Bow. Miah had worked in the local area as a radio presenter, drugs worker and martial arts trainer. The Labour Party selected Rushanara Ali, an Oxford graduate and then-charity worker for the Young Foundation who had previously worked as Parliamentary Assistant to the constituency's former Labour MP, Oona King. Ajmal Masroor, a television presenter on political debates and an imam, was the Liberal Democrat candidate. Zakir Khan was selected by the Conservative Party from an open primary. He was the head of Public Affairs for the Canary Wharf Group based in Tower Hamlets, and a former sports manager.

The election result was a clear win for Labour, this constituency being one of only three that Labour had gained at the 2010 general election, and represented a major setback for Respect (which thereby lost its sole seat in Parliament). Ali won with 21,784 votes (42.9%, up 8.4% for Labour); Masroor came in second with 10,210 (20.1%, up 7.8% for the Liberal Democrats); Miah received 8,532 votes, 16.8% of the total, representing a 19.8% fall in the Respect vote; and Khan received 7,071 (13.9%, a 2.0% increase in the Conservative vote). However, George Galloway did not contest re-election as MP for Bethnal Green and Bow, instead contesting Poplar and Limehouse. He finished in third place there, behind the Conservatives and Labour; but went on to win the Bradford West constituency at a by-election held on 29 March 2012.

== Members of Parliament ==
Election	Member	Party
Feb 1974	Ian Mikardo	Labour
1983	constituency abolished: see Bethnal Green and Stepney	
1997	constituency recreated	
1997	Oona King	Labour
2005	George Galloway	Respect
2010	Rushanara Ali	Labour

== Election results ==
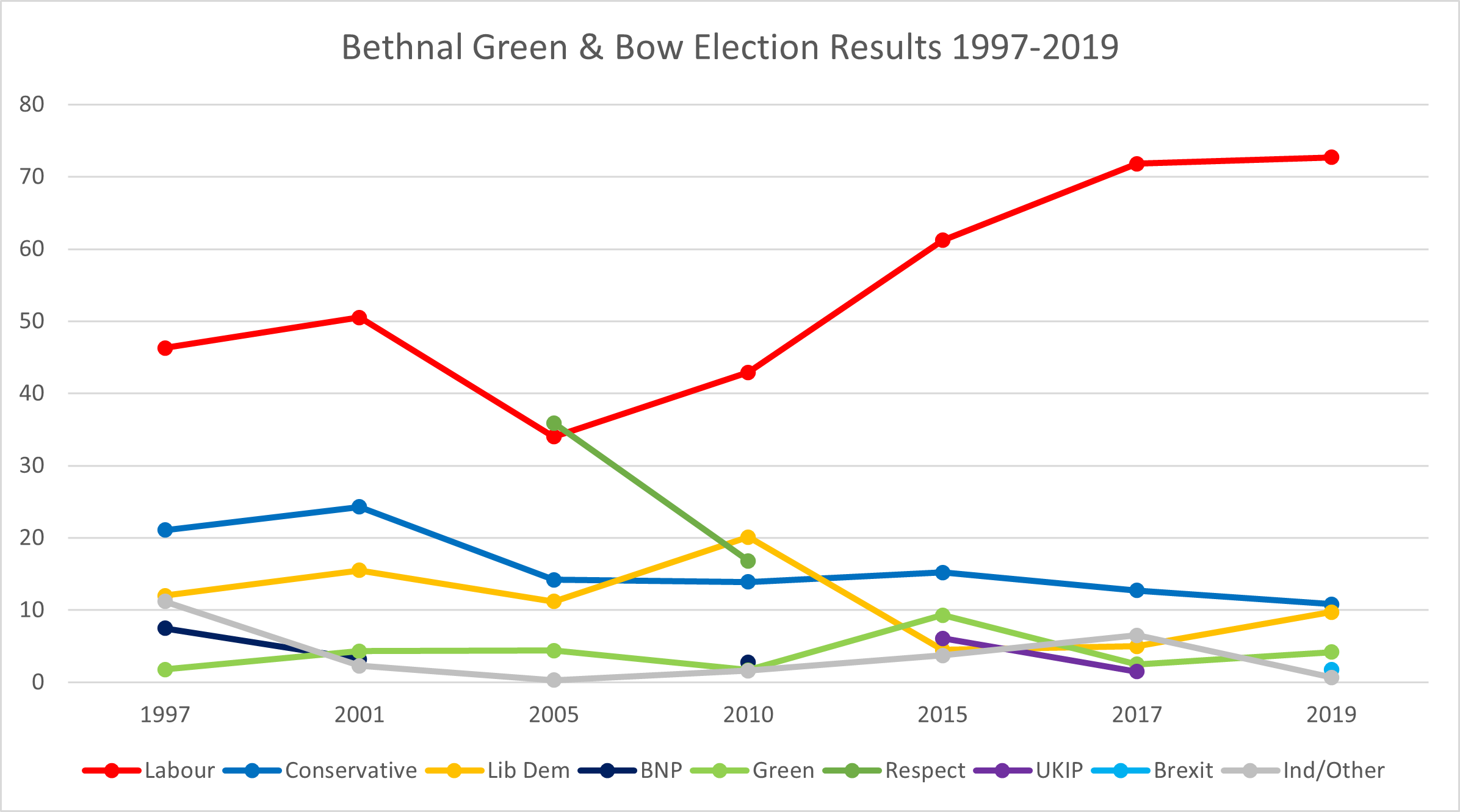

=== Elections in the 2010s ===
2019 general election: Bethnal Green and Bow
Party	Candidate	Votes	%	±%
Labour	Rushanara Ali	44,052	72.7	+0.9
Conservative	Nicholas Stovold	6,528	10.8	−1.9
Liberal Democrats	Josh Babarinde	5,892	9.7	+4.7
Green	Shahrar Ali	2,570	4.2	+1.7
Brexit Party	David Axe	1,081	1.8	New
Animal Welfare	Vanessa Hudson	439	0.7	New
Majority		37,524	61.9	+2.8
Turnout		60,562	68.7	−0.8
Registered electors		88,169		
Labour hold		Swing	+1.4	

2017 general election: Bethnal Green and Bow
Party	Candidate	Votes	%	±%
Labour	Rushanara Ali	42,969	71.8	+10.6
Conservative	Charlotte Chirico	7,576	12.7	−2.5
Independent	Ajmal Masroor	3,888	6.5	New
Liberal Democrats	Will Dyer	2,982	5.0	+0.5
Green	Alistair Polson	1,516	2.5	−6.8
UKIP	Ian de Wulverton	894	1.5	−4.6
Majority		35,393	59.1	+13.1
Turnout		59,825	69.5	+5.5
Registered electors		86,075		
Labour hold		Swing	+6.6	

2015 general election: Bethnal Green and Bow
Party	Candidate	Votes	%	±%
Labour	Rushanara Ali	32,387	61.2	+18.3
Conservative	Matthew Smith	8,070	15.2	+1.3
Green	Alistair Polson	4,906	9.3	+7.6
UKIP	Pauline McQueen	3,219	6.1	New
Liberal Democrats	Teena Lashmore	2,395	4.5	−15.6
TUSC	Glyn Robbins	949	1.8	New
Communities United	M Rowshan Ali	356	0.7	New
CISTA	Jonathan Dewey	303	0.6	New
Whig	Alasdair Henderson	203	0.4	New
The 30–50 Coalition	Elliot Ball	78	0.1	New
Red Flag Anti-Corruption	Jason Pavlou	58	0.1	New
Majority		24,317	46.0	+23.2
Turnout		52,924	64.0	+1.6
Registered electors		82,727		
Labour hold		Swing	+8.5	

2010 general election: Bethnal Green and Bow
Party	Candidate	Votes	%	±%
Labour	Rushanara Ali	21,784	42.9	+8.4
Liberal Democrats	Ajmal Masroor	10,210	20.1	+7.8
Respect	Abjol Miah	8,532	16.8	−19.8
Conservative	Zakir Khan	7,071	13.9	+2.0
BNP	Jeffrey Marshall	1,405	2.8	New
Green	Farid Bakht	856	1.7	−2.8
Independent	Patrick Brooks	277	0.5	New
Pirate	Alexander van Terheyden	213	0.4	New
Independent	Hasib Hikmat	209	0.4	New
Independent	Haji Choudhury	100	0.2	New
Independent	Ahmed Abdul Malik	71	0.1	New
Majority		11,574	22.8	N/A
Turnout		50,728	62.4	+10.9
Registered electors		81,243		
Labour gain from Respect		Swing	+14.1	

=== Elections in the 2000s ===
2005 general election: Bethnal Green and Bow
Party	Candidate	Votes	%	±%
Respect	George Galloway	15,801	35.9	New
Labour	Oona King	14,978	34.0	−16.5
Conservative	Shahagir Faruk	6,244	14.2	−10.1
Liberal Democrats	Syed Dulu	4,928	11.2	−4.3
Green	John Foster	1,950	4.4	+0.1
Independent	Ejiro Etefia	68	0.2	New
Communist League	Celia Pugh	38	0.1	New
Majority		823	1.9	N/A
Turnout		44,007	51.2	+1.0
Registered electors		82,599		
Respect gain from Labour		Swing	+26.2	

2001 general election: Bethnal Green and Bow
Party	Candidate	Votes	%	±%
Labour	Oona King	19,380	50.5	+4.2
Conservative	Shahagir Faruk	9,323	24.3	+3.2
Liberal Democrats	Janet Ludlow	5,946	15.5	+3.5
Green	Anna Bragga	1,666	4.3	+2.5
BNP	Michael Davidson	1,211	3.2	−4.3
New Britain	Dennis Delderfield	888	2.3	New
Majority		10,057	26.2	+1.0
Turnout		38,414	50.2	−10.1
Registered electors		79,192		
Labour hold		Swing	−0.5	

=== Elections in the 1990s ===
1997 general election: Bethnal Green and Bow
Party	Candidate	Votes	%	±%
Labour	Oona King	20,697	46.3	
Conservative	Kabir Choudhury	9,412	21.1	
Liberal Democrats	Syed Dulu	5,361	12.0	
BNP	David King	3,350	7.5	
Liberal	Terry Milson	2,963	6.6	
Independent	Sheref Osman	1,117	2.5	
Green	Stephen Petter	812	1.8	
Referendum	Muhammed Abdullah	557	1.2	
Socialist Labour	Abdul Hamid	413	0.9	
Majority		11,285	25.2	
Turnout		44,682	60.3	
Registered electors		73,008		
Labour win (new seat)				

=== Elections in the 1970s ===
1979 general election: Bethnal Green and Bow
Party	Candidate	Votes	%	±%
Labour	Ian Mikardo	14,227	49.9	−19.0
Liberal	Eric Flounders	6,673	23.4	+10.4
Conservative	Robin Page	5,567	19.5	+9.0
National Front	Martin Webster	1,740	6.1	−1.5
Workers Revolutionary	William Colvill	183	0.6	New
Socialist Unity	Raymond Varnes	153	0.5	New
Majority		7,554	26.5	−29.4
Turnout		28,543	55.5	+2.5
Registered electors		51,436		
Labour hold		Swing		

October 1974 general election: Bethnal Green and Bow
Party	Candidate	Votes	%	±%
Labour	Ian Mikardo	19,649	68.9	+3.3
Liberal	Tudor Gates	3,700	13.0	−6.7
Conservative	Christopher Murphy	2,995	10.5	−4.2
National Front	W.E. Castleton	2,172	7.6	New
Majority		15,949	55.9	+10.0
Turnout		28,516	53.0	−8.0
Registered electors		53,763		
Labour hold		Swing		

February 1974 general election: Bethnal Green and Bow
Party	Candidate	Votes	%	±%
Labour	Ian Mikardo	21,371	65.6	
Liberal	Tudor Gates	6,417	19.7	
Conservative	Christopher Murphy	4,787	14.7	
Majority		14,954	45.9	
Turnout		32,575	61.0	
Registered electors		53,410		
Labour win (new seat)				

== Demography ==
The 2011 census recorded a population of 125,351 people. The constituency has recently become one of the most ethnically diverse areas in the UK, 3.11% of the population were of mixed race, the largest non-mixed ethnic group was white at 41.9 per cent of the population (and of the total: 33.6% of British ethnicity), the second largest ethnic group was Bangladeshi which formed 33.4 per cent of the population, other Asians 6.59 per cent (comprises British Indians, British Pakistanis and other Asians), those of Black race constituted 4.9 per cent (see British African-Caribbean community), Chinese 1.81 per cent, and other ethnic groups, including Arab heritage 2.24 per cent. Statistics from the census recorded 35.4 per cent of people are Muslims, among the highest ten seats by Muslim proportion of the population in the UK.

In 2001 the largest two groups were in the same order, but constituted 46.4% and 35.7% of the population, respectively.

== Bibliography ==
- Boundaries of Parliamentary Constituencies 1885–1972, compiled and edited by F.W.S. Craig (Parliamentary Reference Publications 1972)
- British Parliamentary Election Results 1974–1983, compiled and edited by F.W.S. Craig (Parliamentary Research Services 1984)
- Who's Who of British Members of Parliament, Volume IV 1945–1979, edited by M. Stenton and S. Lees (Harvester Press 1981)
