= Jim Fitzpatrick (politician) =

British Labour politician (born 1952)

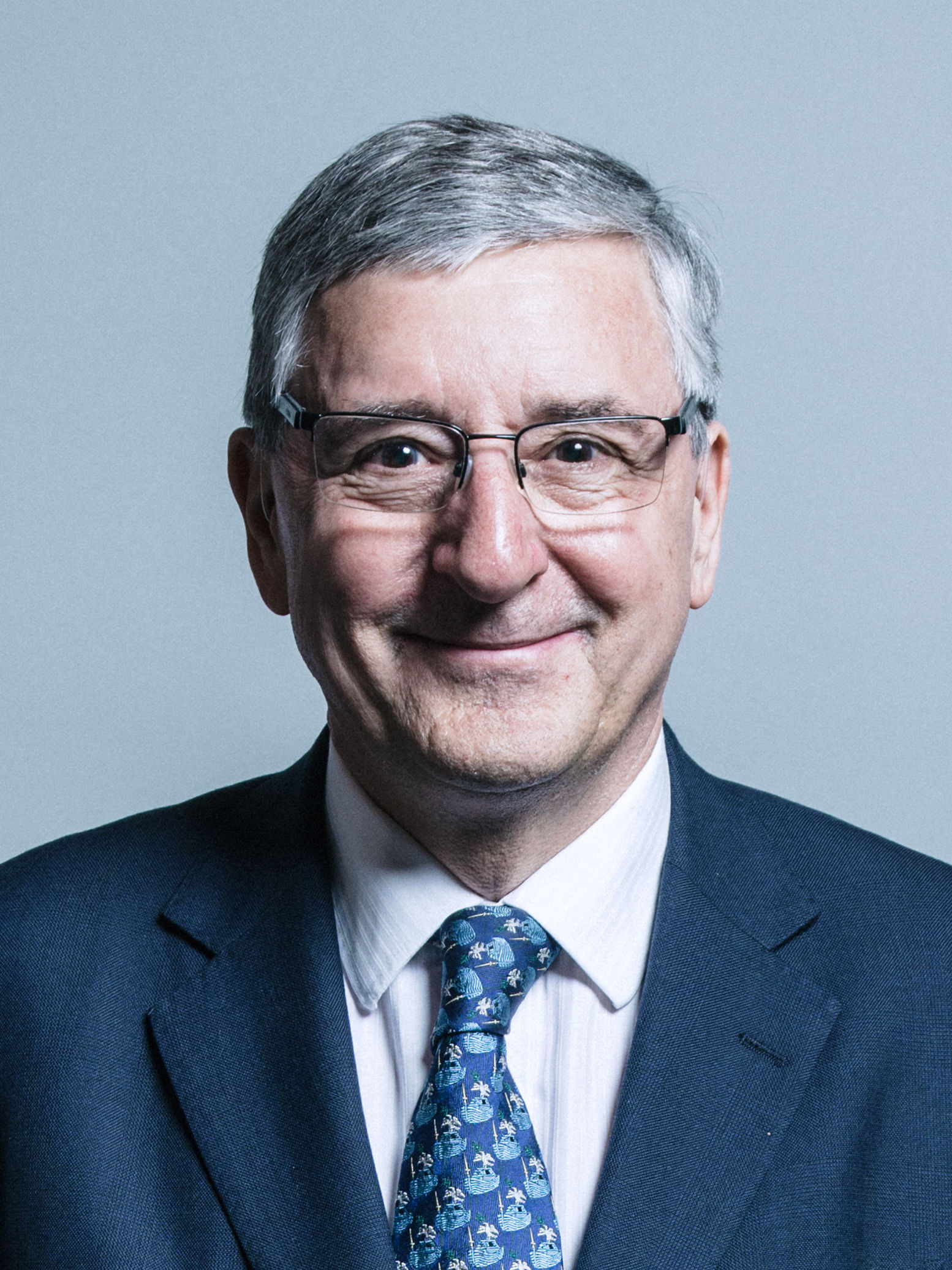
- Official portrait, 2017

Shadow Minister for Aviation, Shipping and Road Safety
- In office 11 October 2010 – 11 October 2013
- Leader: Ed Miliband
- Preceded by: Office established
- Succeeded by: Richard Burden

Minister of State for Food, Farming and the Environment
- In office 8 June 2009 – 11 May 2010
- Prime Minister: Gordon Brown
- Preceded by: Jane Kennedy
- Succeeded by: James Paice

Parliamentary Under-Secretary of State for Transport
- In office 28 June 2007 – 8 June 2009
- Prime Minister: Gordon Brown
- Preceded by: Gillian Merron
- Succeeded by: Chris Mole

Minister for London
- In office 6 May 2005 – 28 June 2007
- Prime Minister: Tony Blair
- Preceded by: Keith Hill
- Succeeded by: Tessa Jowell

Vice-Chamberlain of the Household
- In office 13 June 2003 – 6 May 2005
- Prime Minister: Tony Blair
- Preceded by: Gerry Sutcliffe
- Succeeded by: John Heppell

Lord Commissioner of the Treasury
- In office 29 May 2002 – 13 June 2003
- Prime Minister: Tony Blair
- Preceded by: Anne McGuire
- Succeeded by: Joan Ryan

Member of Parliament for Poplar and Limehouse Poplar and Canning Town (1997–2010)
- In office 1 May 1997 – 6 November 2019
- Preceded by: Constituency created
- Succeeded by: Apsana Begum

Personal details
- Born: 4 April 1952 (age 74) Glasgow, Scotland
- Party: Labour
- Spouse(s): Jane Lowe m. 1980 (divorced); Sheila Hunter m. 2003
- Children: 2 (by Jane Lowe)
- Occupation: Politician
- Awards: Fire Brigade Medal
- Website: www.jimfitzpatrick.org.uk

James Fitzpatrick (born 4 April 1952) is a British politician and former firefighter who served as a Member of Parliament (MP) from 1997 to 2019, for Poplar and Canning Town until 2010 and for Poplar and Limehouse until his retirement. He is a member of the Labour Party.

Fitzpatrick served as Minister of State for Farming and the Environment at the Department for Environment, Food and Rural Affairs during the Brown ministry. In June 2019, he announced that he would not seek re-election to Parliament.

== Early life ==
Fitzpatrick was born at Glasgow, Scotland, and educated locally at the Holyrood R.C. Secondary School in Crosshill. From 1970, he was a trainee with Tytrak in Glasgow, before moving to London in 1973 to become a driver with Mintex. In 1974, he joined the London Fire Brigade as a firefighter, being decorated with the Fire Brigade Long Service and Good Conduct Medal in 1994. He left the fire service when he was elected to the House of Commons in 1997.

Fitzpatrick was elected as Chairman of the Barking Constituency Labour Party, and served as Chairman of the Greater London Labour Party for seven years.

== Parliamentary career ==
=== Member of Parliament ===
Fitzpatrick was selected as the Labour candidate over two sitting MPs, Mildred Gordon and Nigel Spearing.

He was elected to the House of Commons as Member of Parliament for the newly-created seat of Poplar and Canning Town in the London Borough of Tower Hamlets at the 1997 general election with a majority of 18,915. He made his maiden speech in the House of Commons on 17 June 1997.

Fitzpatrick was appointed as the Parliamentary Private Secretary (PPS) to the Chief Secretary to the Treasury, Alan Milburn in 1999, until Milburn became the Secretary of State for Health later in the same year. After the 2001 general election, Fitzpatrick was appointed to government by Tony Blair as an Assistant Government Whip, becoming a Lord Commissioner to the Treasury (Government Whip) in 2002. He was again promoted within the Whips Office in 2003 when he became the Vice-Chamberlain of HM's Household.

==== 2005 Parliament ====
Fitzpatrick was re-elected in the 2005 general election, and was then appointed a junior minister in the Office of the Deputy Prime Minister, then John Prescott, with the role of Minister for London, a role he took with him on his subsequent move to the Department of Trade and Industry in May 2006. In 2007, he argued against a CWU strike saying it would harm their cause.

On 29 June 2007, he moved to become the Parliamentary Under-Secretary of State at the Department for Transport, with shipping, aviation and road safety amongst his responsibilities, and was replaced as Minister for London by Tessa Jowell.

In 2008, during the Christmas period, Fitzpatrick and his wife visited Bangladesh, touring the development projects supported by the Canary Wharf Group. The purpose of the trip was to re-visit the country since 1999, and see the regeneration projects that this group supports. During his visit, he visited the Football Academy in Dhaka, also to Jagannathpur and Sylhet, where many Bangladeshis in the UK originate from including many in his constituency. Fitzpatrick was promoted to Minister of Department for Environment, Food and Rural Affairs in the June 2009 reshuffle. He kept this role until Labour's defeat at the 2010 General Election.

In August 2009, Fitzpatrick left a wedding at the London Muslim Centre when he was told it would be segregated by sex (gender). In a local newspaper article, he blamed the Islamic Forum Europe for encouraging segregation, though the couple claimed Fitzpatrick had "hijacked [the wedding] for political gain". Fitzpatrick stated he had left the wedding as discreetly as possible: "it was never my intention to offend Mr Islam and if he thinks that I done so then of course I will apologise to him".

==== 2010 Parliament ====
Following boundary changes, Fitzpatrick contested the newly-created Poplar and Limehouse constituency in 2010, and was returned with a 4.7% swing to Labour, contrary to the national swing against the Labour Party.

He was campaign manager for former Labour MP Oona King (Baroness King of Bow) in her unsuccessful attempt to be endorsed as the Labour candidate in the 2012 London Mayoral Election. From 2010 until his resignation in 2013, he served as Shadow Minister of State for Transport, covering aviation, shipping and road safety, his former ministerial brief. Fitzpatrick was a parliamentary supporter of Labour Friends of Israel.

In August 2013, he resigned from his front bench role as Shadow Transport Spokesman in order to vote against both Labour and Government motions on the use of chemical weapons in Syria stating he was "opposed to military intervention in Syria, full stop".

==== 2015 and 2017 Parliament ====
In December 2015, Fitzpatrick voted for the use of UK air strikes in Syria against ISIS.

Fitzpatrick was one of 13 MPs to vote against triggering the 2017 general election.

Fitzpatrick has spoken of a desire to implement the decision of the 2016 Brexit referendum and was one of five Labour rebels to support Theresa May's Brexit deal in March 2019; he has voted against proposals for softer forms of Brexit such as EEA membership, against party colleague Yvette Cooper's amendment to delay Brexit to avoid no deal, and for then chairman of the Conservative 1922 Committee Graham Brady's amendment to weaken the Northern Irish backstop.

In June 2019, Fitzpatrick announced that he would not stand for re-election to Parliament, having said that the 2017 general election would be his last election.

== Personal life and honours ==
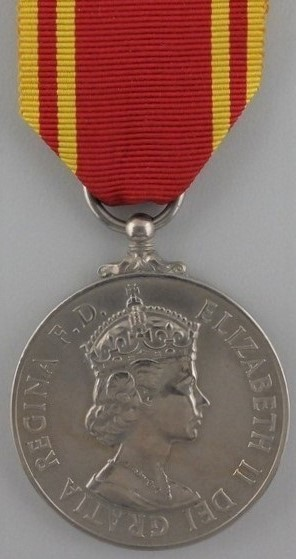

Fitzpatrick married firstly in 1980 Jane Lowe (now divorced), having a son and a daughter.

He married secondly in 2003 Dr Sheila Hunter MBE.

Admitted as a Freeman of the City of London in 2011, Fitzpatrick was elected to the Court of Assistants of the Worshipful Company of Shipwrights in 2017. A Younger Brother of Trinity House, Fitzpatrick is an Honorary Associate of the National Secular Society, and in October 2021 was awarded the Freedom of the Borough of Tower Hamlets.

Parliament of the United Kingdom
New constituency	Member of Parliament for Poplar and Canning Town; 1997–2010	Constituency abolished
New constituency	Member of Parliament for Poplar and Limehouse; 2010–2019	Succeeded by Apsana Begum
Preceded by Gerry Sutcliffe	Vice-Chamberlain of the Household; 2003–2005	Succeeded by John Heppell
Preceded by Keith Hill	Minister for London; 2005–2008	Succeeded by Tessa Jowell
Preceded by Gillian Merron	Parliamentary Under-Secretary of State for Transport; 2008–2009	Succeeded by Chris Mole
Preceded by Jane Kennedy	Minister of State for Farming and the Environment; 2009–2010	Succeeded by James Paice
Party political offices
Preceded by Glenys Thornton	Chairman of the London Labour Party; 1990–1997	Succeeded by Chris Robbins
