= Bromley North (ward) =

- Electoral ward for the Tower Hamlets London Borough Council
- Bromley North ward boundaries since 2014
- Borough: Tower Hamlets
- County: Greater London
- Population: 11,702 (2021)
- Electorate: 7,887 (2022)
- Area: 0.6827 square kilometres (0.2636 sq mi)

Current electoral ward
- Created: 2014
- Councillors: 2
- Created from: Bromley-by-Bow and Mile End East
- GSS code: E05009321

Bromley North is an electoral ward in the London Borough of Tower Hamlets. The ward was first used in the 2014 elections. It returns councillors to Tower Hamlets London Borough Council.

== Tower Hamlets council elections ==
There was a revision of ward boundaries in Tower Hamlets in 2014.

=== 2022 election ===
The election took place on 5 May 2022.

2022 Tower Hamlets London Borough Council election: Bromley North (2)
Party	Candidate	Votes	%	±%
Aspire	Abdul Nazrul	1,495	43.54	+15.94
Aspire	Saif Khaled	1,431	41.67	+25.66
Labour	Najnine Chowdhury	1242	36.18	−5.51
Labour	Muhammad Salam	841	24.49	−10.15
Green	Daniel Blythin-Hammond	346	10.08	+2.21
Green	Bethan Lant	281	8.18	N/A
Liberal Democrats	Nehad Chowdhury	212	6.17	+0.38
Conservative	Jonathan Gillespie	159	4.63	+0.27
Liberal Democrats	Siobhan Proudfoot	156	4.54	+1.19
Conservative	Mohammed Rahman	94	2.74	−0.83
SDP	Jonathon Mabbut	39	1.14	N/A
Rejected ballots		45		
Turnout		3,434	43.54	+1.04
Registered electors		7,887		
Aspire gain from Labour		Swing		
Aspire gain from Labour		Swing		

=== 2018 election ===
The election took place on 3 May 2018.

2018 Tower Hamlets London Borough Council election: Bromley North (2)
Party	Candidate	Votes	%	±%
Labour	Zenith Rahman	1,367	41.69	+8.01
Labour	Dan Tomlinson	1,136	34.64	−10.17
Aspire	Mohammed Miah	905	27.60	−8.83
PATH	Khales Ahmed	795	24.25	−20.56
Aspire	Nazrul Mannan	525	16.01	N/A
PATH	Nehad Chowdhury	353	10.77	N/A
Green	Helen Bateman	258	7.87	−0.34
Liberal Democrats	Janet Ludlow	190	5.79	+1.82
Conservative	Angela Carlton	143	4.36	−2.04
Conservative	Scott Gibson	117	3.57	−1.63
Liberal Democrats	Christopher Rawlins	110	3.35	N/A
Rejected ballots		47		
Turnout		3,326		
Registered electors		7,461		
Labour hold		Swing		
Labour gain from Tower Hamlets First		Swing		

=== 2014 election ===
The election took place on 22 May 2014.

2014 Tower Hamlets London Borough Council election : Bromley North (2)
Party	Candidate	Votes	%	±%
Labour	Khales Ahmed	1,534	44.81	
Tower Hamlets First	Mohammed Miah	1,247	36.43	
Labour	Zenith Rahman	1,153	33.68	
Tower Hamlets First	Moniruzzaman Syed	1,046	30.56	
Green	Christopher Devlin	281	8.21	
Green	Aaron Willson	221	6.46	
Conservative	Angela Carlton	219	6.40	
Conservative	Mark Fletcher	178	5.20	
Liberal Democrats	Victoria Flynn	136	3.97	
TUSC	Daniel McGowan	76	2.22	
Turnout		3,464	51.93	
Labour win (new seat)				
Tower Hamlets First win (new seat)				
