= Treating =

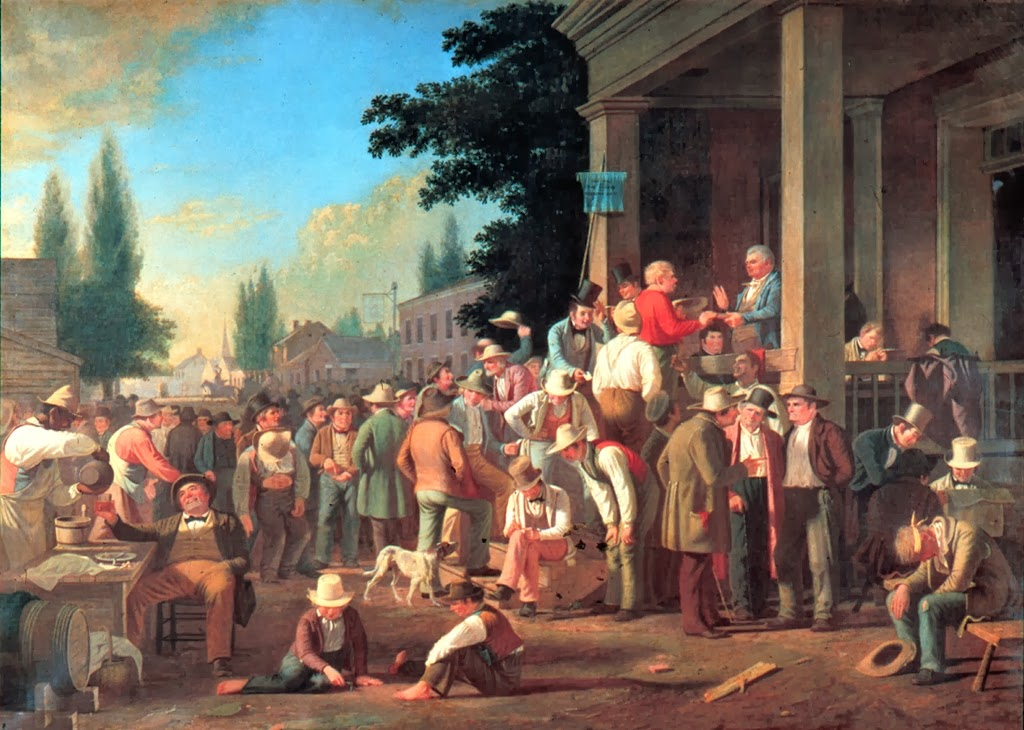
George Bingam's "The County Election" (1852) shows the effects of the campaigns' "treating" the voters with alcoholic beverages: several of them are too drunk to stand without assistance.

In law and politics, treating is the act of serving food, drink, and other refreshments to influence people for political gain, often shortly before an election. In various countries, treating is considered a form of corruption, and is illegal as such. However, as long as the supplying of refreshments is not part of a quid pro quo for votes, etc., it is often not illegal.

== Canada ==
There was an offence of treating under section 94 of the Dominion Elections Act 1874.

== New Zealand ==
In New Zealand, section 217 of the Electoral Act 1993 relates to treating and defines the offence as a corrupt practice. Following the 2023 New Zealand general election, the Electoral Commission investigated the provision of food at Manurewa Marae while it was used as a polling station.

== United Kingdom ==
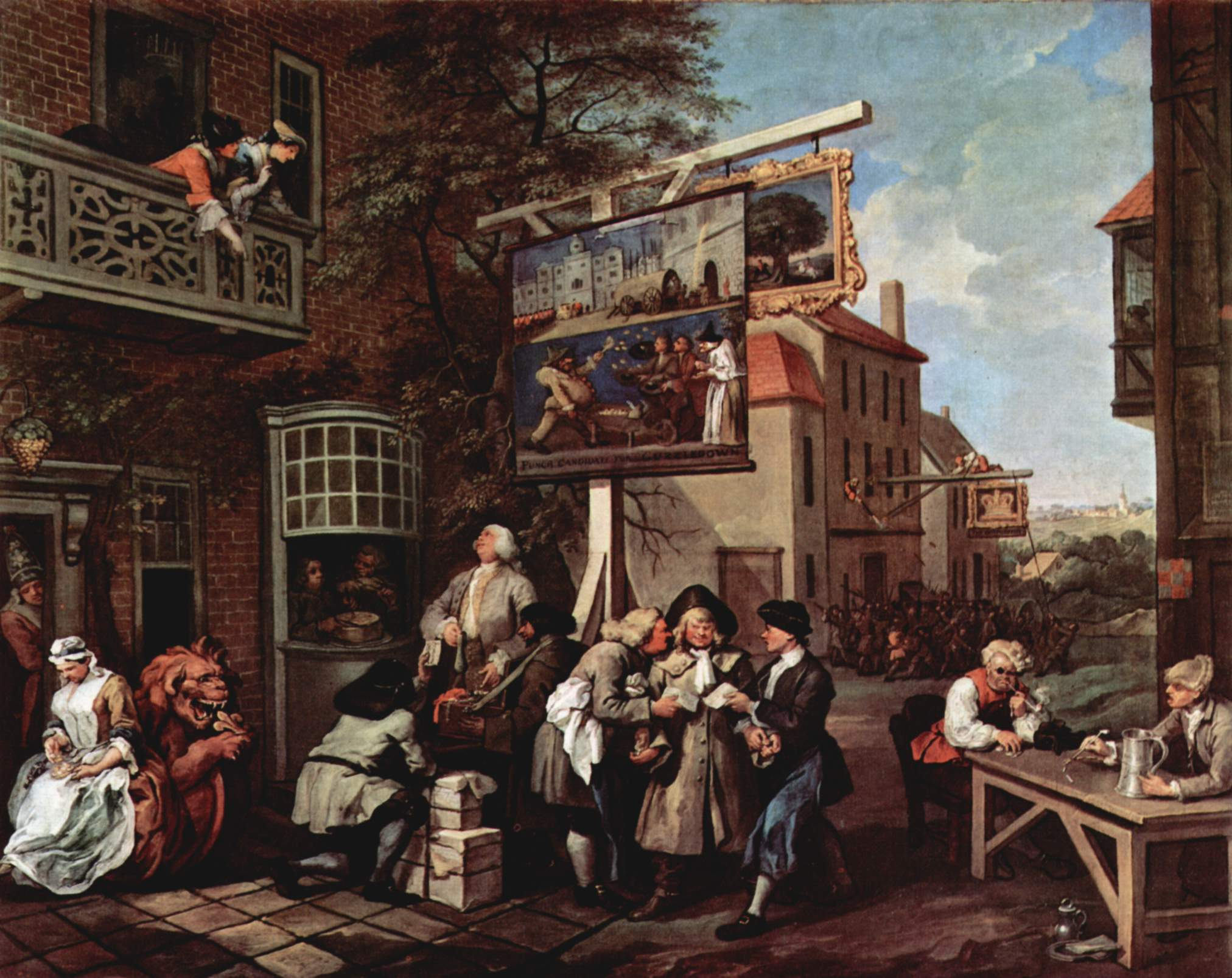
An example of treating shown in William Hogarth's Canvassing for Votes (1755) (see Humours of an Election)

Treating is an electoral fraud criminal offence in the United Kingdom. Treating occurs when an election candidate or their agents offer material incentives for people to vote for them or to abstain from voting. It is a triable either way offence with the sentence being up to either an unlimited fine, one year imprisonment or both, as well as a corrupt practice which may cause the election to be declared void if it may have affected the result.

=== History ===
Historically, the issue of treating at elections was dealt with under common law. An early statute on treating was the Treating Act 1695 (7 & 8 Will. 3 c. 4). In 1840, the House of Lords debated putting treating on a statutory footing similar to bribery, but Sir Charles Knightley in the House of Commons argued that poor electors should be entitled to receive refreshments from candidates if they took a day off work to vote. An early example of treating which led to an election petition to the Election court which nullified an election result was in 1868 in Youghal where the winner Christopher Weguelin was found guilty of treating for buying food and drink for voters in exchange for their vote.

=== Current offence ===
The current offence of treating was created under section 114 of the Representation of the People Act 1983. It stated if election candidates or their agents offered any food, drink, entertainment or any payment in order to make any attempt to prevent voting or to sway voters to vote for them, then they have committed the offence of treating. The recipient is also guilty of the offence if they accept it. The Crown Prosecution Service stated they would only prosecute treating if it was in the public interest and would not prosecute in situations such as if it could not have affected the election process, if it was a genuine mistake or did not go against the spirit of the Representation of the People Act.

In 1911, Seymour King, an MP with 25 years' service, lost his seat after he was discovered to have given coal to the poor and sweets to children to commemorate his length of service, which counted as treating. In 2014, the police received four reports of the alleged offence. In the 2010s, there have been some modern examples of the offence. In April 2015, the Mayor of Tower Hamlets Lutfur Rahman (Tower Hamlets First) was found guilty of a number of electoral fraud offences, including treating, during the 2014 Tower Hamlets mayoral election which resulted in an election court declaring the result of the election void, leading to Rahman being removed from office. An accusation of treating was seen in the 2015 United Kingdom general election where the UK Independence Party candidate for Southampton Itchen, Kim Rose was accused of treating for giving out sausage rolls at a community event; however, Hampshire Constabulary said they would take no action over the allegation. The UKIP leader Nigel Farage criticised the allegation of treating.

== See also ==
- Bribery
- Electoral fraud

== Bibliography ==
=== British Isles ===
- Callum Smith. "The Origins of Sleaze: Visual Culture & Electoral Treating during the 1784 Westminster Election". ECPPEC Conference at Newcastle University, 2022.
- Morgan, "An Eighteenth-Century Election in England" (1922) 37 Political Science Quarterly 585 at 596 and 597
- "Electoral Corruption in the Long Eighteenth Century"
- Dickinson. The Politics of the People in Eighteenth-century Britain. p 29.
- O'Leary. The Elimination of Corrupt Practices in British Elections, 1868–1911. 1962.

=== Canada ===
- Ermatinger. "Treating". Canadian Franchise and Election Laws. 1886. Pages 258 to 269.
- McPherson. "Treating Voter during Election". The Law of Elections in Canada. 1905. Page 432.
- Boyer. Election Law in Canada. Butterworths. 1987. vol 2. pp 719, 953, 965, 970, 990, 1050, 1059, 1067, 1074, 1075, 1085, 1087, 1110, 1123, 1128, 1135 and 1157.

=== Sri Lanka ===
- Costa. "Treating". Law of Parliamentary Elections. 1985. Pages 41 and 75. Revised version of University of Colombo thesis.
