= Erlam v Rahman =

English election court case 2015

- Court: High Court of Justice (Queen's Bench Division) Election Court
- Full case name: Erlam, Simone, Hussein & Moffat v Rahman & Williams
- Decided: 23 April 2015
- Citations: [2014] EWHC 2766 (QB); [2014] EWHC 2767 (QB); [2015] EWHC 1215 (QB); [2015] EWHC 2370 (QB); [2016] EWHC 111 (Ch); [2016] EWHC 1280 (Admin); [2017] EWHC 1413 (Admin); SDT 11457/2015

Case history
- Appealed to: High Court of Justice (Queen's Bench Division) Administrative Court

Court membership
- Judge sitting: Richard Mawrey

Case opinions
- Lutfur Rhaman reported personally guilty and guilty by his agents of corrupt and illegal practices; Corrupt and illegal practices for the purpose of promoting or procuring the election of Lutfur Rhaman as mayor so extensively prevailed that they may reasonably be supposed to have affected the result of the election; Alibor Choudhury reported personally guilty of corrupt and illegal practices; Corrupt practices extensively prevailed at the 2014 Tower Hamlets London Borough Council and Mayoral election

Keywords
- Electoral fraud; Corrupt practices; Personation; Treating; Undue influence; Voter suppression

Erlam and others v Rahman and another [2015] EWHC 1215 (QB) is an English election court case challenging the 2014 election of Lutfur Rahman as the Mayor of the London Borough of Tower Hamlets. On 23 April 2015, Election Commissioner Richard Mawrey voided Rahman's election under the Representation of the People Act 1983 on the grounds of corrupt and illegal practices by him and his agents, and general corruption so extensively prevailing so to reasonably supposed to have affected the election. Rahman's official election agent Alibor Choudhury was ordered to vacate his own office of councillor in the ward of Stepney Green for being guilty of corrupt and illegal practices.

Lutfur Rahman was first elected to the position of mayor in 2010, standing as an independent after controversy surrounded his placement on the Labour Party candidate shortlist and the eventual selection and almost immediate deselection as the party's official candidate. For the 2014 election, Rahman represented Tower Hamlets First, which was formed the year before with Rahman its leader and Choudhury its treasurer. (Note: EWHC 1215 (QB) (2015) ¶ 249) Out of 84,234 accepted votes, Rahman received 36,539 (43.38%) first preference votes with John Biggs second with 27,643 (32.82%). Following a transfer of 856 (11.64%) second preference votes to Rahman and 6,500 (88.36%) to Biggs, Rahman was re-elected as mayor with a winning margin of 3,252 votes.

On 10 June 2014, Andy Erlam, Debbie Simone, Azmal Hussein, and Angela Moffat in their position as electors at the election presented a petition to the High Court questioning Lutfur Rahman's election as mayor on the grounds that among other things Rahman or his agents, or both, committed corrupt and illegal practices contrary to the 1983 Act. Independently of the allegation against Rahman, the petition also requested the election to be set aside on the ground that the returning officer John Williams or his officials, or both, failed to conduct the election correctly under election law. (Note: EWHC 1215 (QB) (2015) ¶ 9)

== Background ==
=== Facts ===
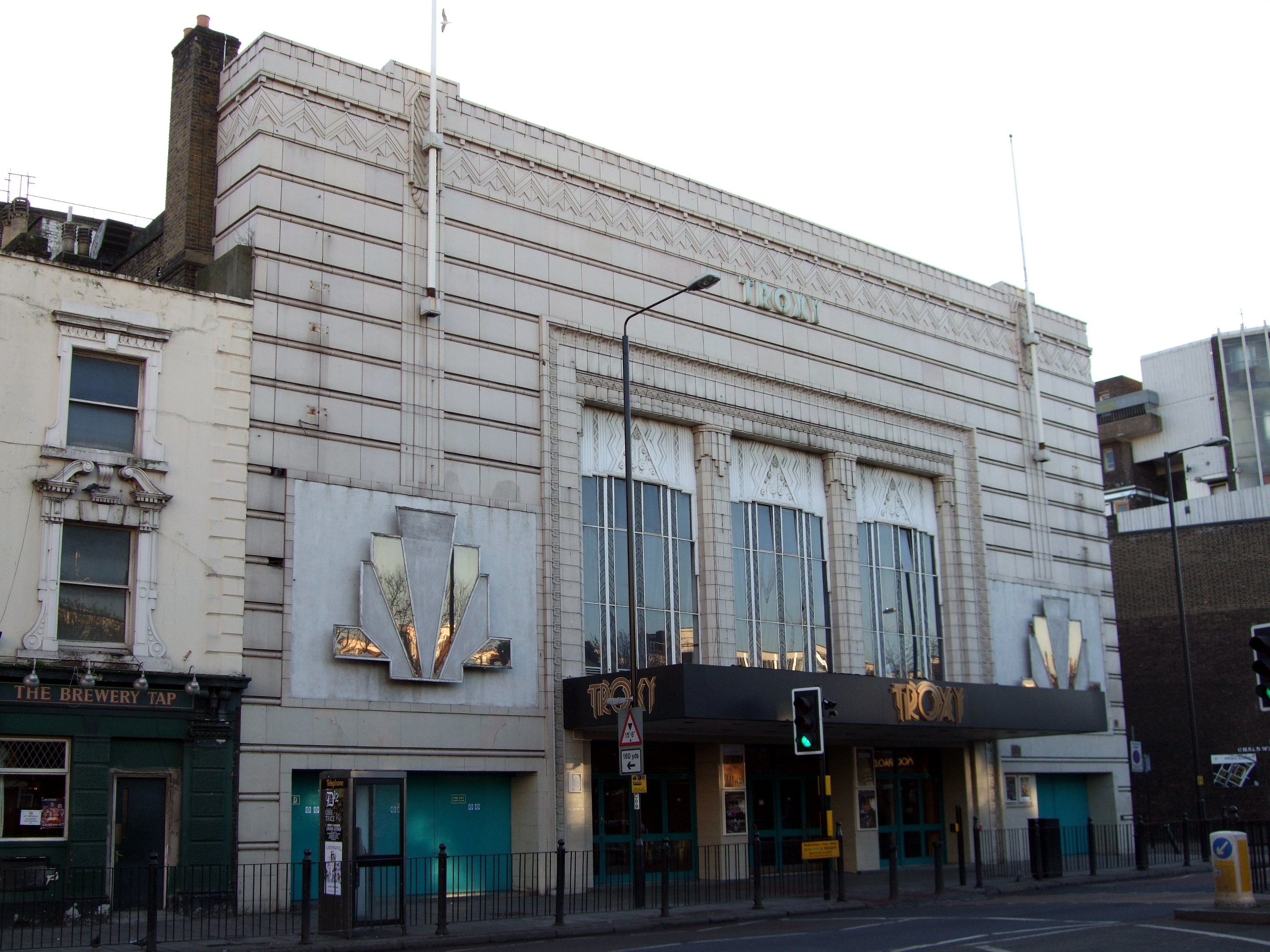
Troxy theatre, the venue for the election count

The 2014 Tower Hamlets mayoral election took place on 22 May 2014, concurrently with elections to all 45 seats on the Tower Hamlets London Borough Council, (Note: Voting for the three Blackwall & Cubitt Town ward seats was postponed to 3 July 2014 due to the death of one of the candidates.) and the 2014 European Parliament election. Ten candidates stood for mayor, with incumbent Lutfur Rahman representing Tower Hamlets First and challengers representing the Conservative Party, Green Party, Labour Party, Liberal Democrats, UKIP, and TUSC along with 3 independents. Voting in the mayoral election was conducted using the supplementary vote system whereby the voter has the option to express a second preference choice, which would be counted in the event no candidate receives more than half the first preference votes and the second preference vote is for one of the two candidates with the most votes in the first round.

Lutfur Rahman was declared winner of the election some time before 2 am on 24 May 2014 with a total of 37,395 first and second preference votes over John Biggs's 34,143 votes.

=== Legal context ===
The result of a local election may only be overturned as a result of findings following an election petition presented by one of the candidates or at least four eligible voters. (Note: RoPA (1983) s. 128) The time limit for presenting a petition is generally 21 days after the election. (Note: RoPA (1983) s. 129) Alternatively, anyone convicted in a criminal court of a corrupt or illegal electoral practice is required to vacate their elected office. (Note: RoPA (1983) s. 173) A successful challenge through an election petition voids the election itself, such that the otherwise successful candidate is not considered ever lawfully elected. (Note: RoPA (1983) s. 159) In contrast, a criminal conviction causes a vacancy to arise, but the original election is considered valid. In either case, a person convicted or reported by an election court personally guilty of corrupt practices is additionally barred from holding any elective office or being registered as a voter for a period of five years. For illegal practices, the period of disqualification is three years. (Note: RoPA (1983) s. 160)

While an election petition is pursued similarly to normal civil claims, a judge sitting in an election court holds more of an inquisitorial role. This inquisitorial power requires the judge to examine and investigate possible electoral malpractice in the electoral area as a whole as opposed to being limited to determining the questions posed by the petition. (Note: Law Commission ¶ 1.19) (Note: EWHC 1215 (QB) (2015) ¶ 39–41) To aid its decision, the court has the power to require the attendance of any person as a witness, and to examine such a witness even if they are not called by either of the opposing parties. Witnesses are required to answer all questions posed to them, but none of their answers may be admitted as evidence against them in future court proceedings except in cases of perjury proceeding against the witness in respect of the evidence given. (Note: Law Commission ¶ 1.21 & 1.22)

Though it is a civil court, the general standard of proof used by an election court for allegations of corrupt or illegal practices is that of a criminal one, namely that of beyond reasonable doubt. (Note: Law Commission ¶ 1.24) (Note: EWHC 1215 (QB) (2015) ¶ 46) The same criminal standard of proof was used by Richard Mawrey on determining whether there was general corruption designed to secure Lutfur Rahman's election, but the lower civil standard on whether such corruption affected the result. (Note: EWHC 1215 (QB) (2015) ¶ 49 & 50)

=== Representation ===
At the election court trial, the petitioners were represented by Francis Hoar, Lutfur Rahman was represented by Duncan Penny QC, instructed by K&L Gates; and the returning officer was represented by Timothy Straker QC, instructed by Sharpe Pritchard.

== Pre-trial hearings ==
=== Protective costs order ===
In light of the possible financial cost that may be awarded against them if their petition proved to be unsuccessful, the petitioners applied for a limited protective costs order on 9 July 2014 to cap any potential cost recovery by the respondents to no more than £25,000 plus VAT, and their own cost to £50,000 plus VAT. (Note: EWHC 2766 (QB) (2014) ¶ 42) Subsequently, the petitioners attempted to adjourn the application, which along with the application itself was denied after a hearing by High Court judges Michael Supperstone and Robin Spencer sitting as a divisional court on the grounds that the petitioners had deliberately failed to disclose their financial means when making the initial application. (Note: EWHC 2766 (QB) (2014) ¶ 48)

=== Application to dismiss petition ===
At the same hearing, the divisional court heard an application by Lutfur Rahman to dismiss the petition under Rule 4(1)(d) of the Election Petition Rules 1960 or the inherent jurisdiction of the court, or both. Counsel for Rahman argued for the dismissal on the grounds that the petition's many allegations of electoral offences were stated without sufficient detail as to the basis of the allegations. (Note: EWHC 2766 (QB) (2014) ¶ 4) In rejecting the application for dismissal, the court referenced among other things Saghir & Others v Najib & Others (Note: Saghir & Others v Najib & Others [2005] EWHC 417 (QB) at para. 53, High Court (England and Wales)) and Hussein & Others v Khan & Others (Note: Hussein & Others v Khan & Others [2006] EWHC 262 (QB) at para. 50, High Court (England and Wales)) in support of the petitioners' position that election courts have at least since the mid-nineteenth century allowed further details to be provided on request, instead of dismissing an election petition outright, (Note: EWHC 2766 (QB) (2014) ¶ 27 & 29) an action the divisional court then undertook by ordering for more details to be provided by the petitioners in response to a request previously made by both respondents individually. (Note: EWHC 2766 (QB) (2014) ¶ 7)

=== Venue ===
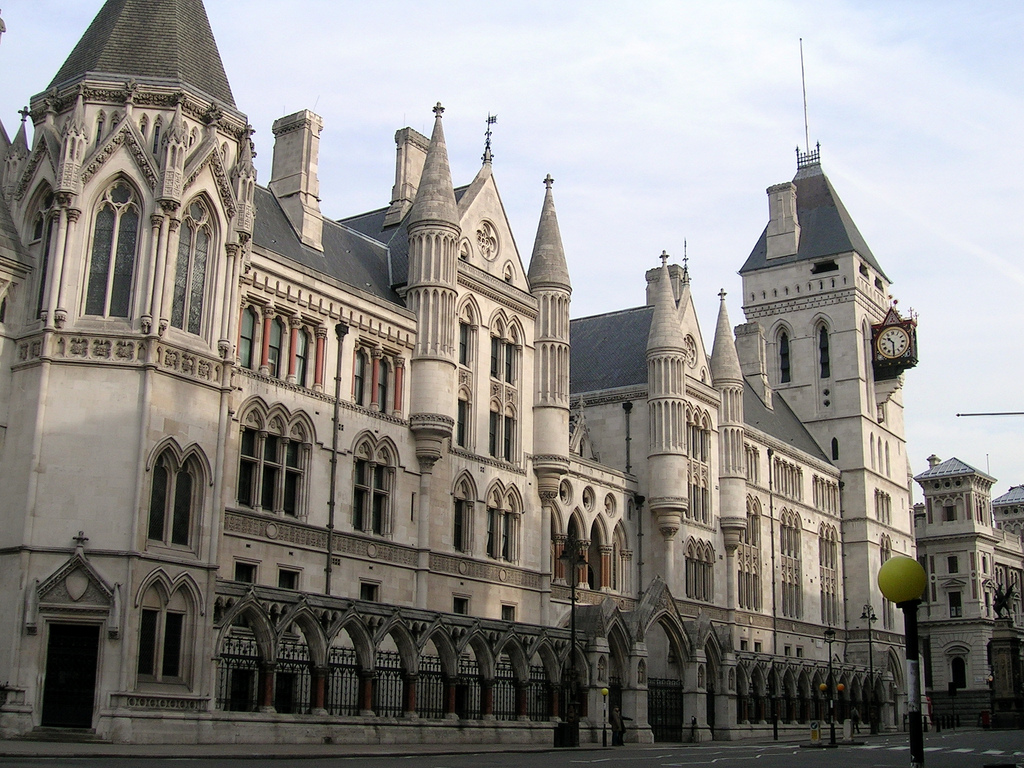
The Royal Courts of Justice, where the trial eventually took place

Following the divisional court hearing into Rahman's application to dismiss and the petitioners' application for an adjournment of their application for a protective costs order, Supperstone J sitting on his own heard an application by the petitioners to move the trial outside of Tower Hamlets for fear of intimidation by supporters of Rahman. (Note: EWHC 2767 (QB) (2014) ¶ 4) This request was rejected by the court, which held the prospect of large number of attendees and the associated potential for public rowdiness was not enough to justify ignoring the long-standing provision within primary legislation (Note: RoPA (1983) s. 130) requiring trials to be held in the local government area for which the election was held, in this case the London Borough of Tower Hamlets.

During its argument, counsel for John Williams drew the court's attention to section 130(7) of the 1983 Act of the power of the election court to adjourn the trial to another place at the Commissioner's discretion, (Note: EWHC 2767 (QB) (2014) ¶ 16) a discretion Richard Mawrey subsequently exercised when he moved the trial to the Royal Courts of Justice from Tower Hamlets Town Hall after regarding the town hall as not a neutral venue.

== Election court hearing ==
Following agreement between the petitioners and John Williams, allegations against the returning officer and his staff were withdrawn on the first day of the hearing. (Note: EWHC 1215 (QB) (2015) ¶ 13)

Overall, Richard Mawrey found Lutfur Rahman's testimony unreliable and evasive, in most instances preferring other witnesses' evidence where they conflicted with Rahman's. Mawrey also expressed dissatisfaction over "one or two witnesses'" use of interpreter when they clearly demonstrated a good understanding of the English language, such as answering questions before the interpreter spoke, or when the witness was the editor of an English language newspaper. (Note: EWHC 1215 (QB) (2015) ¶ 302–304)

Throughout the case, it was the petitioners submission that Tower Hamlets First was in reality a "one-man band" for the sole purpose of the continuation of Lutfur Rahman as mayor, rather than a genuine political party. This position was given further support by Rahman's own evidence and that of his witnesses, with the admission that candidates for Tower Hamlets First required Rahman's personal approval. (Note: EWHC 1215 (QB) (2015) ¶ 285–288 & 292) Given Rahman's control over candidate selection, the candidates were taken to be within the category of Rahman's agents under electoral law. (Note: EWHC 1215 (QB) (2015) ¶ 306)

=== False registration ===
Provision of false information to a registration officer is an offence under section 13D of the 1983 Act. While no specific allegation of false registration was particularised on the election petition, evidence was heard by the court as part of the case on personation and other voting offences. A schedule containing multiple false registrations was submitted to and accepted by the court where all entries were shown to have voted for Rahman. (Note: EWHC 1215 (QB) (2015) ¶ 334)

Particular examples of false registration highlighted in the judgment include that of former councillor Kabir Ahmed, councillor Shahed Ali, Moniruzzaman Syed, and Aktaruz Zaman, all of whom were candidates representing Tower Hamlets First at the 2014 Tower Hamlets council election in the wards of Weavers, Whitechapel, Bromley North, and both St Peter's and Blackwall & Cubitt Town respectively.

=== Personation ===
Voting with a false registration in the name of another person is the offence of personation under section 60 of the 1983 Act, and all of the entries listed in the schedule of false registrations were known to have voted. (Note: EWHC 1215 (QB) (2015) ¶ 337)

=== Voting when not entitled ===
Having concluded that Kabir Ahmed, Moniruzzaman Syed, and Aktaruz Zaman voted in their own name, but with an otherwise false registration, it followed that they were guilty of the offence of voting when not entitled under section 61(1) of the 1983 Act.

=== Double voting ===
In the case of Shahed Ali, who was registered at two different addresses within the ward he was elected in, both registrations were used to vote in the election for Lutfur Rahman. If both registrations were used by Ali, then he had committed the offence of voting more than once under section 61(2) of the 1983 Act. Where one of the registrations was used by another person, that person would be guilty of personation. (Note: EWHC 1215 (QB) (2015) ¶ 339)

=== Postal vote offences ===
The court heard evidence from men representing or acting on behalf of Lutfur Rahman, inducing of voters handing over partially completed postal voting documents, and in certain instances taking the uncompleted ballot papers against the voter's will. (Note: EWHC 1215 (QB) (2015) ¶ 357–359)

An expert witness gave evidence that out of 134 ballots analysed, two sets of approximately one quarter of the total were completed in the same ink. Additionally, many of the documents analysed showed inconsistent electrostatic detection apparatus impressions, whereby different parts of the voting documents were completed by different authors. (Note: EWHC 1215 (QB) (2015) ¶ 366 & 367)

While none of the evidence in isolation would be enough for a finding of corrupt practices, it was Richard Mawrey's view that taken together the criminal standard for postal vote offences under section 62A was met. (Note: EWHC 1215 (QB) (2015) ¶ 371–373)

=== Tampering with ballot papers ===
Of the 46 ballot papers accepted showing a change of first preference vote from another candidate to Lutfur Rahman, 26 were from an original vote for John Biggs. Richard Mawrey concluded that this was not sufficient a pattern to reach the criminal standard of proof for the alleged offence of tampering with ballot papers. (Note: EWHC 1215 (QB) (2015) ¶ 375 & 376)

=== Undue influence ===
==== Spiritual influence ====
The election court also ruled against Rahman on the grounds of "undue spiritual influence", referring to a letter in his support signed by 101 imams.

==== Intimidation ====
The petitioners alleged that there was undue influence under section 115 of the 1983 Act through "intimidation at polling stations, voters going into polling booths together or leaving campaign material inside polling booths". The court in its judgment quickly rejected that going into polling booths together or leaving campaign material amounted to undue influence, leaving only intimidation at polling stations to be more thoroughly considered. (Note: EWHC 1215 (QB) (2015) ¶ 144 & 145)

==== Misleading of voters ====
On the allegation that voters were misled by being told that Lutfur Rahman was the Labour Party candidate, the court decided that the evidence presented "was much too flimsy". (Note: EWHC 1215 (QB) (2015) ¶ 146)

== Judgment ==
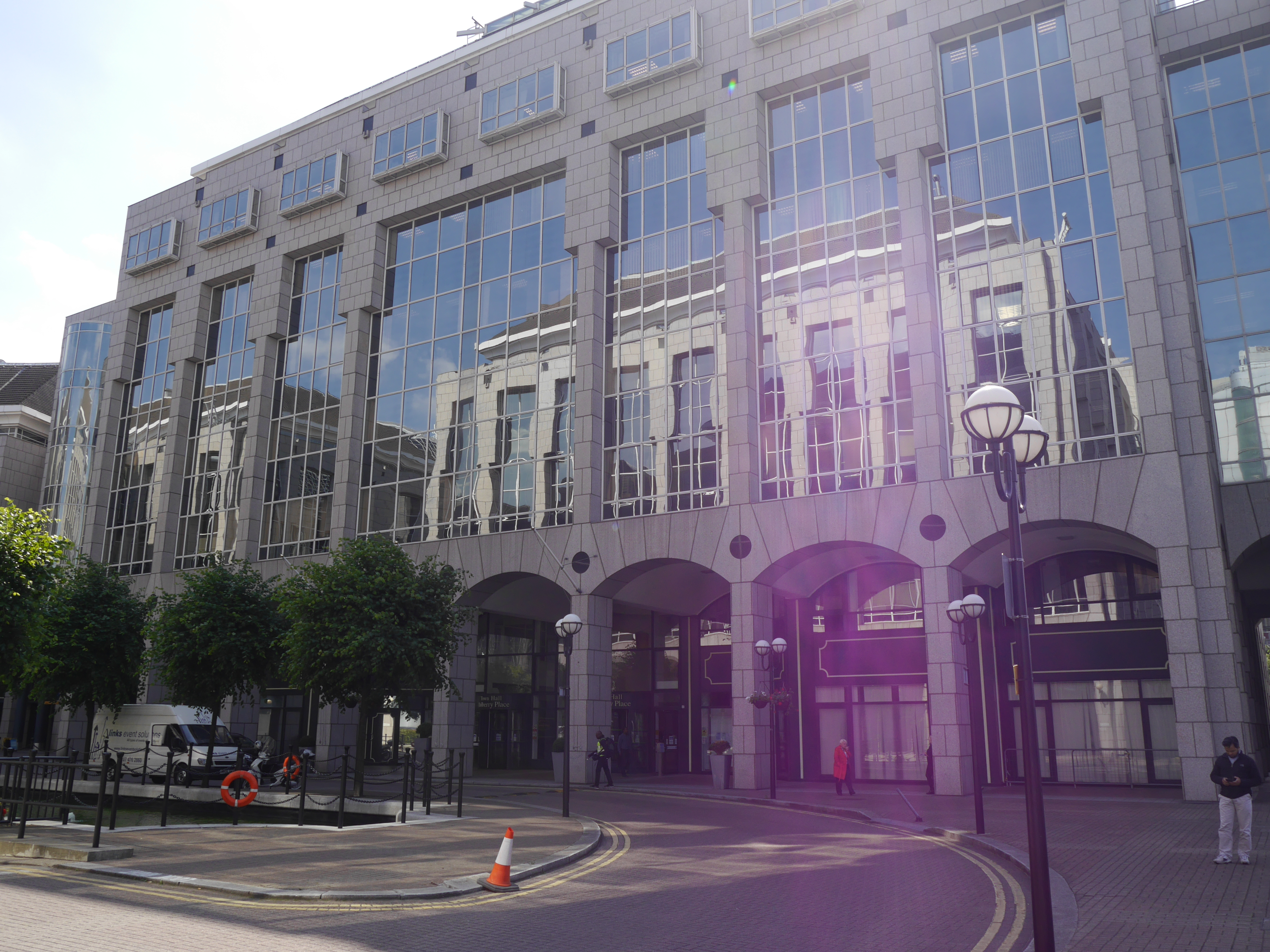
Tower Hamlets Town Hall at Mulberry Place, the original location of the trial, and the venue for the count of the subsequent election held in June 2015.

Lutfur Rahman was found personally guilty by the court of making false statements about a candidate, bribery, and undue spiritual influence. The court also found Rahman guilty by his agents of personation, postal vote offences, provision of false information to a registration officer, voting when not entitled, making false statements about a candidate, payment of canvassers, bribery, and undue spiritual influence. A finding that corrupt and illegal practices for the purpose of securing Rahman's election, and that such general corruption so extensively prevailed such that it could be reasonably concluded to have affected the result was also returned. (Note: EWHC 1215 (QB) (2015) ¶ 672 & 673) Alibor Choudhury was found personally guilty of bribery, making false statements about a candidate, and payment of canvassers. (Note: EWHC 1215 (QB) (2015) ¶ 677)

As a consequence of the findings, the 2014 mayoral election was deemed void, and Alibor Choudhury was required to vacate his office of councillor with immediate effect. Both Rahman and Choudhury were barred from holding elective office, voting or being registered as a voter for five years as bribery and undue influence constitute corrupt practices. While non-practising, Rahman was a solicitor on the Solicitors Regulation Authority's roll of solicitors. As such, a copy of the judgment was brought to the attention of the Solicitors Regulation Authority for potential misconduct proceedings against Rahman as required by section 162 of the 1983 Act. (Note: EWHC 1215 (QB) (2015) ¶ 676)

More generally, the court also certified that corrupt practices extensively prevailed at the 2014 Tower Hamlets council election. (Note: EWHC 1215 (QB) (2015) ¶ 678)

== Reaction ==
After the ruling, Lutfur Rahman and Tower Hamlets First released a statement on Rahman's personal website expressing their shock at the decision and rejecting the court's findings. The statement further alleges that "the court system was marred by bias, slurs and inaccuracies", and notes Rahman intention to appeal the judgment. An online petition hosted on 38 Degrees in support of Rahman attracted more than 6,400 supporters. A rally in support of Rahman was organised a week after the court judgment, where supporters were encouraged to donate to a fund set up in aid of Rahman possible appeal. Speakers at the rally included former MP George Galloway, and former Mayor of London Ken Livingstone. Expression of support was given by Len McCluskey, General Secretary of Unite the Union.

Lead petitioner Andy Erlam called the result "a fantastic result for democracy". John Biggs, who came second in the May 2014 election released a statement saying:

Today's ruling is a victory for honest politics. By setting out to break the rules and going to extraordinary lengths to win last May's mayoral election, Lutfur Rahman and his allies robbed the people of Tower Hamlets of the free and fair mayoral election they deserved and betrayed everyone in our community who trusted and voted for him.

A Tower Hamlets Council spokesperson welcomed the Commissioner's judgment which cleared John Williams and council staff of allegations of fraudulent practices related to the running of the May 2014 election. The spokesperson also said:

We welcome recognition that the council's strong electoral processes – which have been subject to further intense scrutiny during this petition hearing – are sound

Secretary of State for Communities and Local Government Eric Pickles said the judgment vindicated the government's decision to send Conor commissioners into Tower Hamlets the previous year.

Based on the election court findings that Tower Hamlets First did not operate any responsible financial scheme, (Note: EWHC 1215 (QB) (2015) ¶ 275) nor in the manners as submitted in its registration as a political party, (Note: EWHC 1215 (QB) (2015) ¶ 273) the Electoral Commission removed Tower Hamlets First from its register of political parties on 29 April 2015. The 17 remaining councillors affiliated with Tower Hamlets First went on to sit as an independent group. Shahed Ali was later disqualified as a councillor after pleading guilty to fraud related to housing benefit. Of the remaining 16, 7 eventually left the group, 4 of whom sat together under the banner People's Alliance of Tower Hamlets with Shafi Ahmed who replaced Ali as councillor, with the rest as independents.

At a rally in support of Rahman, Peter Herbert, a part-time judge and Chair of the Society of Black Lawyers, criticised the Commissioner's judgment. In the same speech, Herbert also said:

Racism is alive and well and living in Tower Hamlets, in Westminster and, yes, sometimes in the judiciary.

By-elections to fill the vacancy created by the removals of Lutfur Rahman and Alibor Choudhury were held on 11 June 2015. Labour's Sabina Akhtar was elected as councillor in the ward of Stepney Green with 42.11% of the vote. The by-election for the new mayor was contested by 10 candidates including Labour's John Biggs, Andy Erlam representing Red Flag Anti-Corruption, and Rabina Khan who was elected as a councillor representing Tower Hamlets First in the 2014 election. Khan, who received the backing of Rahman, stood as an independent following the deregistration of Tower Hamlets First. Biggs won the by-election with a total of 32,754 first and second preference votes over Khan 26,384 votes.

== Cost proceedings ==
Following his judgment, Richard Mawrey ordered Lutfur Rahman to pay the petitioners' costs to be assessed on the standard basis if not agreed between the parties. An order for an interim payment of £250,000 to be paid within 14 days was also made pending agreement or assessment of costs, (Note: EWHC 2370 (QB) (2015) ¶ 3) estimated at £500,000. Rahman was also ordered to pay the costs of John Williams, the Director of Public Prosecutions, the Metropolitan Police, and expenses incurred in the hosting of the election court. As a result of the costs order, Andy Erlam obtained interim charging orders on two investment properties registered solely in Rahman's name as security for the judgment debt. (Note: EWHC 2370 (QB) (2015) ¶ 5 & 6) Rahman's wife Ayesha Farid filed objection to the charging orders claiming absolute beneficial interest on one of the two properties, and 74% beneficial interest in the other. (Note: EWHC 2370 (QB) (2015) ¶ 7) Despite the objection, Erlam was able to obtain a final charging order on the second property on 29 June 2015. Additionally, an interim charging order was then secured against a property registered solely in Farid's name on the argument that Rahman has a beneficial interest in it.

Due to Lutfur Rahman's failure to pay court cost as ordered, and Ayesha Farid's claims of beneficial interest in their properties, Andy Erlam applied for Rahman's assets to be frozen to prevent dissipation in case Farid's claim was upheld. Knowles J granted Erlam an interim freezing and disclosure order on 29 June 2015, which was extended by Edis J to cover assets worldwide. (Note: EWHC 2370 (QB) (2015) ¶ 2) The disclosure order required Rahman to reveal his worldwide assets, details his income and expenditure for the previous five years, and to produce seven years worth of personal tax returns.

A hearing into Ayesha Farid's claim originally set for 30 September 2015 was rescheduled to 1–3 December. Less than 2 weeks before the December hearings, Lutfur Rahman was declared bankrupt on his own petition. As a result, proceedings in respect to the two properties without a final charging order was stayed pursuant to section 285 of the Insolvency Act 1986. (Note: EWHC 111 (Ch) (2016) ¶ 4) Determination on Farid's claim of 74% beneficial interest on the remaining property continued at the court's discretion. The property was purchased in 2005 with a mortgage in Rahman's name, (Note: EWHC 111 (Ch) (2016) ¶ 21) and all rental payments income and mortgage payments outgoing were handled by Rahman. As part of her evidence, Farid produced a declaration of trust dated May 2006 in support of her claim.

On 29 January 2016, chief master Matthew Marsh ruled against Ayesha Farid granting a declaration that Lutfur Rahman holds an absolute beneficial interest in the property under question. (Note: EWHC 111 (Ch) (2016) ¶ 83) In his ruling, Marsh accused Lutfur Rahman, who was not called as a witness by Ayesha Farid (Note: EWHC 111 (Ch) (2016) ¶ 68) of knowingly providing misleading information when making his mortgage application, and failure to declare rental income received to HM Revenue and Customs. Farid was labelled by Marsh as "a thoroughly unsatisfactory and unreliable witness" with a "cavalier attitude to disclosure" who was "willing to alter and extend her case when challenged". (Note: EWHC 111 (Ch) (2016) ¶ 67) In addition to finding that Farid had failed with her evidence to establish a trust on the balance of probabilities, (Note: EWHC 111 (Ch) (2016) ¶ 75) the declaration of trust of May 2006 was also held to be a sham, "prepared in order to be available, if needed" (Note: EWHC 111 (Ch) (2016) ¶ 82) rather than to reflect the true position.

A further cost hearing was scheduled for April 2016.

As of 22 June 2017, approximately £290,000 of court cost including interest incurred on the unpaid amount remains outstanding.

== Judicial review ==
The Representation of the People Act 1983 does not provide for decisions of the election court to be challenged. However, in R v Cripps, ex parte Muldoon [1984] QB 68 the divisional court of Robert Goff LJ and Mann J decided that decisions of a local election court may be judicially reviewed. (Note: EWHC 3169 (Admin) (2010) ¶ 15)

An application for permission to bring a judicial review was made by Lutfur Rahman in July 2015, with a hearing held on 26 January 2016. The application was made in the hopes of reducing Rahman's incapacity from holding elective office from five years to three years. (Note: Matrix Chambers ¶ 3) While maintaining that many of the election court findings were wrong, the application acknowledged that challenges may only be made on those conclusions which amount to error of law. (Note: Matrix Chambers ¶ 8 & 29) The election court's findings that canvassers were paid in contravention of section 111 of the 1983 Act, and that Rahman is guilty of bribery personally and by his agent in contravention of section 113, were challenged on the basis that they were reached without sufficient evidence such that it amounts to an error of law, and that the commissioner erred when interpreting the provision on bribery. A challenge was made to the finding of undue spiritual influence on the basis that the Commissioner's conclusion was contrary to precedent, and incompatible with Article 9 or Article 10 of the European Convention on Human Rights, or both. (Note: Matrix Chambers ¶ 30) The divisional court of Lloyd LJ and Supperstone J granted Rahman permission to bring a judicial review on the undue spiritual influence finding because the law had not been tested for over a century, but rejected the other two challenges, as a result leaving in place Rahman's five year ban from elective office even if he were to be successful in a judicial review. The judicial review application was closed following the non-payment of the court fee. (Note: EWHC 1413 (Admin) (2017) ¶ 10)

A renewed application for permission to bring a judicial review was made by Lutfur Rahman in August 2016, (Note: EWHC 1413 (Admin) (2017) ¶ 31) after the Metropolitan Police concluded in March 2016 there was insufficient evidence to bring a criminal prosecution. As part of the renewed application, permission to reopen the original judicial review application was sought and granted by Ouseley J. The August 2016 application took the form of an application for permission to amend the grounds of the July 2015 judicial review claim. Three additional grounds for review were sought by Rahman. The first two grounds relied on Article 6 of the European Convention on Human Rights, arguing that the election court findings are incompatible with the presumption of innocence and right to a fair trial, given the subsequent decision of the Metropolitan Police. (Note: EWHC 1413 (Admin) (2017) ¶ 32) (Note: EWHC 1413 (Admin) (2017) ¶ 64) Permission for those two grounds were rejected by the divisional court with the findings that Rahman was at no point charged with a criminal offence for the purpose of Article 6, and that there were no parallel criminal proceedings alongside civil proceedings of the election court. (Note: EWHC 1413 (Admin) (2017) ¶ 56) (Note: EWHC 1413 (Admin) (2017) ¶ 71) Permission to include the second ground was additionally denied on the basis of undue delay in raising the issue by Rahman. (Note: EWHC 1413 (Admin) (2017) ¶ 87) Under the third ground, Rahman sought a declaratory judgment that the Metropolitan Police decision to discontinue criminal investigation into him constituted an acquittal, and thus triggering the power of a court to order the cessation of the incapacity previously imposed by the election court judgment. (Note: EWHC 1413 (Admin) (2017) ¶ 78) Permission was denied based on the earlier finding that Rahman had not been charged, and thus impossible to have been acquitted on a prosecution. (Note: EWHC 1413 (Admin) (2017) ¶ 80)

== Subsequent developments ==
Lutfur Rahman was charged by the Solicitors Regulation Authority before the Solicitors Disciplinary Tribunal in February 2016 of failure to uphold the rule of law and the proper administration of justice, act with integrity, or behave in a way that maintains the trust the public places in him and in the provision of legal services. The hearing into the charges was scheduled to take place between 7–10 March 2017 but was adjourned pending the determination of Rahman's second application for permission to bring a judicial review of the election court decision. The rearranged hearing started on Monday 18 December 2017 after the tribunal panel rejected an application for adjournment by Rahman filed the previous Friday on the grounds that he could not finance a representative nor feel able to self-represent given his inexperience in disciplinary matters. On 20 December 2017, all charges against Rahman were found proven and he was struck off the roll of solicitors along with a costs order of £86,400.

After an investigation by the Judicial Conduct Investigations Office, Peter Herbert was reprimanded and given "formal advice" for his comments implying the election court judgment was tainted by racism. In response to the investigation, Herbert lodged a claim against the Ministry of Justice for race discrimination and victimisation. The matter was settled in 2020 after the Judicial Conduct Investigations Office sent Herbert an apology, without accepting wrongdoing or liability; Herbert said "I took the view that I had successfully held the senior judiciary accountable for their actions."

From the end of 2016, Lutfur Rahman and his associates, including his former deputy Ohid Ahmad, attempted to form a new political party named Tower Hamlets Together. Following media reporting of the attempted party formation, Parliamentary Secretary (Minister for the Constitution) Chris Skidmore wrote to the Electoral Commission requesting Tower Hamlets Together's application for registration as a political party to be subject to a "forensic review". On 23 February 2017, the Electoral Commission rejected the application for registration with the reason that the proposed party name would "likely to mislead voters as to the effect of their vote", as the name is the same as that of a partnership of local health and social care organisations. A second attempt to form a new political party in January 2018 with the name of Aspire was successful. Members of this new party on the council consisted of the nine remaining members of the independent group plus Mohammed Mufti Miah, who had left the group and sat as an independent for a time. People's Alliance of Tower Hamlets was itself registered as a political party in February 2018, with members on the council consisted of the five members who sat together before the party's registration and Abjol Miah who sat as an independent after leaving the Independent Group.

In response to the Metropolitan Police decision not to bring charges against Lutfur Rahman, Chair of the London Assembly Police and Crime Committee Steve O'Connell made a formal request to Deputy Mayor for Policing and Crime Sophie Linden for an investigation by Her Majesty's Inspectorate of Constabulary on the Metropolitan Police activities surrounding the 2014 mayoral election, a request Linden granted. The Metropolitan Police subsequently announced a fresh investigation into alleged electoral fraud in the London Borough of Tower Hamlets.

== See also ==
- Alistair Carmichael § Campaign memo and election petition
- Phil Woolas § 2010 re-election and election court case

== Notes and references ==
=== Case citations ===
- Citation format: year of decision; abbreviated title of the court/reporter; the decision or page number

=== Bibliography ===
General

- "Representation of the People Act 1983", legislation.gov.uk, The National Archives, 1983 c. 2
- Erlam & Ors v Rahman & Anor [2015] EWHC 1215 (QB) (23 April 2015), High Court of Justice (Queen's Bench Division) Election Court
- PwC (4 November 2014). "Best value inspection of London Borough of Tower Hamlets". Department for Communities and Local Government.
- "Research Paper: Legal Challenge to Elections" (PDF). Ministry of Justice. Law Commission. Archived from the original (PDF) on 4 October 2015.
- Erlam & Ors v Rahman & Anor [2014] EWHC 2766 (QB) (7 August 2014), High Court of Justice (Queen's Bench Division)
- "The Election Petition Rules 1960", legislation.gov.uk, The National Archives, SI 1960/543
- Erlam & Ors v Rahman & Anor [2014] EWHC 2767 (QB) (7 August 2014), High Court of Justice (Queen's Bench Division)
- Erlam v Rahman [2015] EWHC 2370 (QB) (6 August 2015), High Court of Justice (Queen's Bench Division)
- Erlam & Ors v Rahman & Farid [2016] EWHC 111 (Ch) (29 January 2016), High Court of Justice (Chancery Division)
- R (Woolas) v The Speaker of the House of Commons [2010] EWHC 3169 (Admin) (3 December 2010), High Court of Justice (Queen's Bench Division) Administrative Court
- Matrix Chambers (2 July 2015). "Grounds for Judicial Review" (PDF). Trial by Jeory.
- R (Rahman) v Local Government Election Court & Ors [2016] EWHC 1280 (Admin) (26 January 2016), High Court of Justice (Queen's Bench Division) Administrative Court
- R (Rahman) v Local Government Election Court [2017] EWHC 1413 (Admin) (21 June 2017), High Court of Justice (Queen's Bench Division) Administrative Court
- Solicitors Regulation Authority v Lutfur Rahman 11457/2015 Archived 24 January 2018 at the Wayback Machine (18 January 2018) Solicitors Disciplinary Tribunal

Specific
