= Richard Mawrey =

Richard Mawrey, KC is a barrister and Deputy High Court Judge in the United Kingdom. He is a bencher of Gray's Inn and a member of Henderson Chambers. In his role as a judge in election cases, he has repeatedly criticised the postal voting system in the United Kingdom.

Mawrey came to public notice in 2005 as the Commissioner presiding over the Election court which ruled that the 2004 elections in two Birmingham City Council wards, Aston and Bordesley Green, had been invalid due to extensive electoral fraud through the manipulation of postal ballots. He found six Labour councillors personally guilty of corrupt practices, although one was cleared on appeal. He also severely criticised the whole postal vote system, saying, of a Government statement that "the systems already in place to deal with the allegations of electoral fraud are clearly working", that "anybody who has sat through the case I have just tried and listened to evidence of electoral fraud that would disgrace a banana republic would find this statement surprising." His opinions are widely at odds with that of experts in the field, including the Electoral Commission, who state there is no evidence of widespread postal vote fraud.

Other recent cases in which Mawrey has sat as Commissioner in election cases include a petition against the result for the Central ward of Slough Borough Council held on 3 May 2007. In that case he said "I have been appalled ... by the ease with which these substantial frauds were committed", and went on to say that "despite the 2006 [Electoral Administration] Act, the opportunities for easy and effective electoral fraud remain substantially as they were on 4th April 2005."

Mawrey's most recent Election Petition judgement was in Erlam & Ors v Rahman & Anor when he removed from public office, with immediate effect, the London Borough of Tower Hamlets elected mayor Lutfur Rahman and an elected serving councillor Alibor Choudhury. Both men were members of the subsequently de-registered Tower Hamlets First political party.

In addition to presiding over legal cases, he has advocated electoral law reform, but his arguments have been criticised by some academics such as Toby James.
