= John Biggs (London politician) =

Mayor of Tower Hamlets from 2015 to 2022

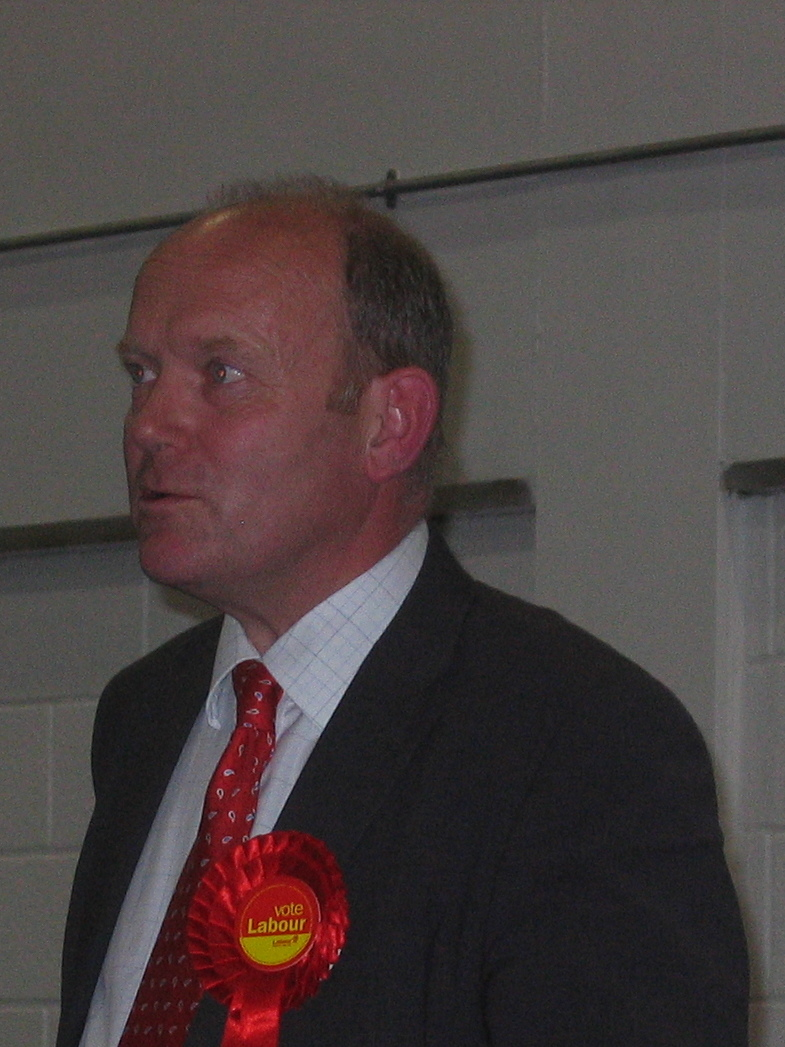
- Biggs in 2008

Mayor of Tower Hamlets
- In office 15 June 2015 – 8 May 2022
- Preceded by: Lutfur Rahman
- Succeeded by: Lutfur Rahman

Member of the London Assembly for City and East
- In office 4 May 2000 – 7 May 2016
- Preceded by: Constituency established
- Succeeded by: Unmesh Desai

Personal details
- Born: John Robert Biggs; 19 November 1957 (age 68)
- Party: Labour Co-op
- Spouse: Christine Sibley (m. 1993; div. 2015)
- Education: University of Bristol

John Robert Biggs (born 19 November 1957) is a British Labour Co-op politician who was Mayor of Tower Hamlets between 2015 and 2022.

Biggs was first elected to Tower Hamlets London Borough Council in 1988 where he served as a Councillor for St Katharine's Ward and later St Dunstan's Ward until 2002. He was selected as Leader of the Labour Group in 1991, and became a Council Leader in 1994 following a landslide election win.

In 2000, he successfully ran for the City and East Constituency London Assembly seat. Over the course of a 16-year career in the Assembly he served as a member of the Metropolitan Police Authority, London Fire and Emergency Planning Authority, London Health Commission, Deputy Chair of the London Development Agency, Deputy Chair of the London Thames Gateway Development Corporation, Chair of Transport, Chair of Planning and Spatial Development, Chair of Regeneration, Chair of the London Assembly Budget Committee, and Chair of the GLA Audit Committee.

He was elected Mayor of Tower Hamlets in 2015, and reelected in 2018. In 2007 he was made an Honorary Fellow of Queen Mary University, and of Birkbeck College in 2016.

== Early life and education ==
He was educated at Queen Elizabeth's School, Barnet and graduated from the University of Bristol in 1979 having studied chemistry. He then studied Computer Science at Birkbeck College, University of London, and later studied law at the University of Westminster while serving as a Councillor.

He served as an elected politician in London, in Tower Hamlets and East London between 1988 and 2022. In his 20s, Biggs worked as a Systems Analyst in the City of London. Later, he was director of the Labour affiliated Socialist Health Association from 1997 to 2000.

He is an Honorary Fellow of Queen Mary University (2007) and Birkbeck College (2016).

== Tower Hamlets Council ==
Biggs was elected to Tower Hamlets London Borough Council in 1988, first as councillor for St Katharine's Ward, and Later St Dunstan's Ward until 2002. He was selected as the Labour Group leader in 1991, during the period the council was Liberal Democrat controlled (1986–1994).

He led Labour to a landslide victory in 1994, leading the campaign to remove the UK's first BNP councillor, and the populist but discredited Liberal Democrat administration.

After standing down as leader in 1995, he remained an active councillor but also attended Law School, served as Director of the Socialist Health Association (1997–2000), and was Deputy Chair of Bow Housing Action Trust (1995–2004).

== London Assembly ==
Biggs represented City and East Constituency at City Hall between 2000 and 2016, during the tenures of Ken Livingstone and Boris Johnson. Under Ken Livingstone's, initially independent mayoralty, relationships were frosty due in part to the circumstances of Livingstone's election and his subsequent support for Lutfur Rahman, but improved with time.

As Assembly Member between 2000 and 2008 he was appointed Deputy Chairman of the London Development Agency (2004–2008) and served on the Metropolitan Police Authority (2000–2003), London Fire and Emergency Planning Authority and the London Health Commission. He was appointed by Government as Deputy Chair of the London Thames Gateway Development Corporation (2004–2008). Within the Assembly, he was variously Chair of Transport, Chair of Planning and Spatial Development, and Chair of Regeneration.

Under Boris Johnson he was a witty and bitter critic although the men developed a strange if challenging rapport. Aside from challenging the Mayor in debate he was for 7 years Chair of the London Assembly Budget Committee. He was also Chair of the GLA Audit Committee, which among other matters considered issues of conduct including of the Mayor. Upon his election as Mayor of Tower Hamlets in 2016 he stood down from the Assembly, and was succeeded by Unmesh Desai.

The fact that anybody, let alone unpaid workers, were forced to sleep under London Bridge is truly scandalous. To make it worse it appears that many of these people were essentially blackmailed into taking unpaid work, otherwise they wouldn't be able to work at the Olympics or would risk losing their benefits. How many of us would accept working unpaid, being forced to sleep outside and not given access to changing rooms or toilets? This incident is a sad indictment of the way our country is headed.

— John Biggs AM

== Mayor of Tower Hamlets ==
=== 2014: Candidate ===
Having won selection as the Labour candidate for directly elected Mayor of Tower Hamlets, Biggs stood against incumbent Lutfur Rahman in 2014. Rahman had previously won support from Mayor of London Ken Livingstone. Livingstone reversed his public position after auditors were appointed to investigate allegations of mismanagement and fraud at the council, but remained privately supportive.

Rahman won the Supplementary Vote election in the second round with 37,395 (52.27%) votes to Biggs' 34,143 (47.73%) with a total of 84,234 valid ballots cast.

Immediately following the election, four voters challenged the result in the case Erlam v Rahman. In a rare intervention the election court overturned the result, ejecting both Rahman and his election agent from office, barring both from future public office for five years, and forcing a fresh election.

The evidence laid before this court has disclosed an alarming state of affairs in Tower Hamlets. This is not the consequence of the racial and religious mix of the population, nor is it linked to any ascertainable pattern of social or other deprivation. It is the result of the ruthless ambition of one man..

— Richard Mawrey QC

Today's ruling is a victory for honest politics. Rahman and his allies robbed the people of Tower Hamlets of the free and fair mayoral election they deserved and betrayed everyone in our community who trusted and voted for him, by setting out to break the rules and going to extraordinary lengths to win.

— John Biggs AM

In 2014 Rahman's actions while in office led to government appointed commissioners being brought in to the council to review its grant making practices. Further investigations were ordered following the election court judgement in 2015. The final government direction was lifted in 2017.

=== 2015: Victory and first term ===
Following the verdict in Erlam v Rahman a by-election was held on 11 June 2015. Biggs stood against an independent candidate Rabina Khan, who was endorsed by the disqualified Rahman. Biggs beat Khan with 32,754 (55.39%) votes to her 26,384 (44.61%).

His first term in office was dominated by addressing the concerns caused by Rahman's actions, and successfully having the government directions lifted. His administration was also marked by a commitment to transparency and accountability, the previous Mayor having markedly refused to answer questions publicly or in the Council chamber.

"I promised to build in transparency and accountability to my engagement with residents; the Assembly was a new and important step towards delivering this promise. I am committed to engaging with residents, key partners and improving services to ensure that Tower Hamlets is a great place to live.

— Mayor John Biggs

=== 2018: Reelection and second term ===
Biggs stood for reelection against Rabina Khan now representing the People's Alliance of Tower Hamlets, a party formed from the rump of Lutfor Rahman's disgraced Tower Hamlets First, and Tower Hamlets Independent Group. Biggs won the election with 44,865 (72.66%) votes to Kahn's 16,878 (27.34%), and his leadership resulted in Labour increasing its number of councillors to 42 out of 45.

In his second Mayoral term Biggs,

- Led a major programme to provide 2000 additional council homes;
- invested in parks and the public realm;
- led the borough's response to COVID-19;
- continued the service improvement begun in his first term; and
- campaigned for improving residents' safety.

Mayor Biggs committed to investing in additional council funded police officers and youth services, along with a post at the Royal London to work with victims and perpetrators of violence.

Like other London Council Leaders, this all took place to a backdrop of massive budget savings, while working to protect services from national funding cuts.

As a result of work achieved during Biggs tenure Tower Hamlets London Borough Council won a number of awards and was shortlisted for a number of others, including

- Digital Impact;
- Growth and Economic Development;
- Public Health;
- Mental Health;
- Substance Misuse Services;
- Carbon Reduction;
- Hate Crime & Violence against Women;
- Most Improved Council;
- Public Health;
- Council of the Year; and
- Most Improved Council of the Year.

=== 2022: Loss ===
Biggs lost re-election in 2022 to Rahman and his newly formed Aspire Party by 40,804 (54.90%) to 33,487 (45.10%) votes, a result viewed by many as a surprise.

Following the election he announced his retirement from elected politics and now works as a consultant and Non-Executive Director. He has also been a government appointed commissioner.

He is currently a Director (2022–) of Islington & Shoreditch Housing Association.

Civic offices
Preceded by Lutfur Rahman	Mayor of Tower Hamlets; 2015–2022	Succeeded by Lutfur Rahman
