= Stepney Green (ward) =

- Electoral ward for the Tower Hamlets London Borough Council
- Stepney Green ward boundaries since 2014
- Borough: Tower Hamlets
- County: Greater London
- Population: 12,342 (2021)
- Electorate: 8,270 (2022)
- Area: 0.6261 square kilometres (0.2417 sq mi)

Current electoral ward
- Created: 2014
- Number of members: 2
- Councillors: Abdul Wahid; Sabina Akhtar
- Created from: St Dunstan's and Stepney Green; Whitechapel
- GSS code: E05009334

Stepney Green is an electoral ward in the London Borough of Tower Hamlets. The ward was first used in the 2014 elections. It returns councillors to Tower Hamlets London Borough Council.

== Tower Hamlets council elections ==
There was a revision of ward boundaries in Tower Hamlets in 2014.

=== 2026 election ===
The election took place on 7 May 2026.

2026 Tower Hamlets London Borough Council election: Stepney Green
Party	Candidate	Votes	%	±%
Aspire	Sabina Akhtar	1,940		
Aspire	Abdul Wahid	1,784		
Green	Volker Gulde	698		
Labour	Sanu Miah	693		
Green	Roderick McGlynn	679		
Labour	Nanziba Nasima	574		
Liberal Democrats	Aminur Khan	494		
Reform	Anthony Newland	206		
Reform	Karen Biebuyck	203		
Tower Hamlets Independents	Mohammed Rahman	136		
Liberal Democrats	Simon Tunnicliffe	115		
Conservative	Freddy Simpson	114		
Tower Hamlets Independents	Hassan Diriye	106		
Conservative	Pankaj Goyal	82		
Turnout				
Rejected ballots		16		
Aspire hold				
Aspire gain from Labour				

=== 2022 election ===
The election took place on 5 May 2022.

2022 Tower Hamlets London Borough Council election: Stepney Green (2)
Party	Candidate	Votes	%	±%
Aspire	Abdul Wahid	1,623	39.55	+26.59
Labour	Sabina Akhtar	1,588	38.69	−16.30
Aspire	Shuhel Malique	1,346	32.80	+24.88
Labour	Motin Uz-Zaman	1,121	27.31	−12.27
Liberal Democrats	Akhlaqur Rahman	676	16.47	−5.37
Liberal Democrats	Kim Nottage	332	8.09	+3.81
Green	Kirsty Chestnutt	308	7.50	−0.75
Green	Thomas Mackay	202	4.92	+0.27
Conservative	Stephen Alton	198	4.82	−1.01
Conservative	Panagiotis Koutroumpis	108	2.63	−2.10
Rejected ballots		62		
Turnout		4,104	49.63	+1.84
Registered electors		8,270		
Aspire gain from Labour		Swing		
Labour hold		Swing		

=== 2018 election ===
The election took place on 3 May 2018.

2018 Tower Hamlets London Borough Council election: Stepney Green (2)
Party	Candidate	Votes	%	±%
Labour	Sabina Akhtar	2,105	54.99	+19.99
Labour	Motin Uz-Zaman	1,515	39.58	+17.98
PATH	Akhlaqur Rahman	836	21.84	N/A
PATH	Ahbab Miah	620	16.20	N/A
Aspire	Oliur Rahman	496	12.96	−31.53
Green	Kirsty Chestnutt	316	8.25	−1.05
Aspire	Habibur Rahman	303	7.92	N/A
Conservative	David Fell	223	5.83	+1.10
Conservative	Tiffany Trenner-Lyle	181	4.73	+0.97
Green	George Lyle	178	4.65	N/A
Liberal Democrats	Ailbhe Rees	164	4.28	+0.86
Liberal Democrats	Antony Sanders	148	3.87	N/A
Rejected ballots		57		
Turnout		3,885	47.79	
Registered electors		8,130		
Labour gain from Tower Hamlets First		Swing		
Labour gain from Tower Hamlets First		Swing		

=== 2015 by-election ===
A by-election was held on 11 June 2015, following the Erlam v Rahman election court case which removed Alibor Choudhury from office.

2015 Stepney Green by-election
Party	Candidate	Votes	%	±%
Labour	Sabina Akhtar	1,643	42.11	+6.61
Independent	Abu Chowdhury	1,472	37.72	N/A
Green	Kirsty Chestnutt	272	6.97	−2.33
UKIP	Paul Shea	203	5.20	−3.56
Conservative	Safiul Azam	158	4.05	−0.68
Liberal Democrats	Will Dyer	114	2.92	−0.50
Something New	Jessie Macneil-Brown	40	1.03	N/A
Majority		171	4.39	
Turnout		3,939	47.37	
Labour gain from Tower Hamlets First		Swing		

=== 2014 election ===
The election took place on 22 May 2014.

2014 Tower Hamlets London Borough Council election : Stepney Green (2)
Party	Candidate	Votes	%	±%
Tower Hamlets First	Alibor Choudhury	2,023	45.80	
Tower Hamlets First	Oliur Rahman	1,965	44.49	
Labour	Sabina Akhtar	1,568	35.50	
Labour	Victoria Obaze	954	21.60	
Green	Hilary Clarke	411	9.30	
UKIP	Nicholas McQueen	387	8.76	
Conservative	Chris Wilford	209	4.73	
Conservative	Hugo Mann	166	3.76	
Liberal Democrats	Martin Donkin	151	3.42	
Turnout		4,463	54.90	
Tower Hamlets First win (new seat)				
Tower Hamlets First win (new seat)				
