= Parliamentary Elections Act 1868 =

Act of the Parliament of the United Kingdom

Parliamentary Elections Act 1868 (Note: Section 1.)
- Act of Parliament
- Parliament of the United Kingdom
- Long title: An Act for amending the Laws relating to Election Petitions, and providing more effectually for the Prevention of corrupt Practices at Parliamentary Elections.
- Citation: 31 & 32 Vict. c. 125
- Introduced by: Prime Minister Benjamin Disraeli (Commons)
- Territorial extent: United Kingdom

Dates
- Royal assent: 31 July 1868
- Commencement: 31 July 1868 (Note: The Acts of Parliament (Commencement) Act 1793.)
- Expired: 31 July 1869 (Note: Section 59.)
- Repealed: Northern Ireland: 18 April 1979 (Note: The Judicature (Northern Ireland) Act 1978 (Commencement No. 4) Order 1979 (SI 1979/422).); Scotland: England and Wales: 5 November 1993
Other legislation
Amended by	Statute Law Revision Act 1875; Perjury Act 1911; Administration of Justice (Scotland) Act 1933; Representation of the People Act 1948; Representation of the People Act 1949; Election Commissioners Act 1949; Senior Courts Act 1981
Repealed by	Northern Ireland: Judicature (Northern Ireland) Act 1978; Scotland: Court of Session Act 1988; England and Wales: Statute Law (Repeals) Act 1993

Status: Repealed

Text of statute as originally enacted

The Parliamentary Elections Act 1868 (31 & 32 Vict. c. 125), sometimes known as the Election Petitions and Corrupt Practices at Elections Act or simply the Corrupt Practices Act 1868, was an act of the Parliament of the United Kingdom. The effect of the act was to transfer responsibility for trying election petitions from the House of Commons to the judges of the High Court of Justice. The act was designed to, and did, provide a more effective measure for preventing corruption and fraud in parliamentary elections.

== Background ==
The 1865 general election was regarded by contemporaries as being a generally dull contest nationally, which exaggerated the degree of corruption within individual constituencies. In his PhD thesis, Cornelius O'Leary described The Times as having reported "the testimony is unanimous that in the General Election of 1865 there was more profuse and corrupt expenditure than was ever known before". As a result of allegations of corruption, 50 election petitions were lodged, of which 35 were pressed to a trial; 13 ended with the elected MP being unseated. In four cases a royal commission had to be appointed because of widespread corrupt practices in the constituency. When he came into office in 1867, Benjamin Disraeli announced that he would introduce a new method for election petition trials (which were then determined by a committee of the House of Commons). Disraeli proposed that this take the form of two assessors visiting the constituency and determining the outcome, with an appeal to the House of Commons which could appoint a select committee should it decide to take the matter up. This bill was referred to a select committee which altered it so that the jurisdiction was given to the Court of Queen's Bench, with no appeal to the House, but with a three-member Court of Election Appeals for points of law. At this point the bill was withdrawn, so that it could be reintroduced the following year.

== Passage ==
When the bill was reintroduced in February 1868, Disraeli noted that the Lord Chief Justice Sir Alexander Cockburn, had written to the Lord Chancellor expressing the "strong and unanimous feeling of insuperable repugnance" to their proposed duties under the bill. He had therefore changed the proposal again, to propose an election court which would have three members. The Liberal opposition did not attack the principle of the bill, although two individual Liberal MPs fervently opposed it, with Alexander Mitchell arguing he was "convinced that the retention by the House of its own jurisdiction and the right of determining who were its Members was essential to its dignity and independence". There was a feeling in the press and in Parliament that a makeshift court was not of suitable esteem to take over what had been a matter of parliamentary privilege. Disraeli therefore came up with a compromise, which William Gladstone accepted, whereby two judges of the Court of Common Pleas, Exchequer of Pleas or Queen's Bench would be designated to try election petitions with full judicial salaries. The passage of the bill was prolonged in the House of Commons because of opposition, but passed through the House of Lords in five days and the bill received royal assent on 31 July 1868.

== Subsequent developments ==
Sections 3, 15 and 56 of the act were repealed by section 21(2) of, and the schedule to, the Election Commissioners Act 1949 (12, 13 & 14 Geo. 6. c. 90), which came into force on 23 February 1950.

Section 11 of the act was repealed by section 152(4) of, and schedule 7 to, the Senior Courts Act 1981, which came into force on 1 January 1982.

The whole act was repealed for Northern Ireland by section 122(2) of, and part I of schedule 7 to, the Judicature (Northern Ireland) Act 1978, which came into force on 18 April 1979.

The whole act was repealed for Scotland by section 52(2) of, and part I of schedule 2 to, the Court of Session Act 1988, which came into force on 29 September 1988.

The whole act was repealed for England and Wales by section 1(1) of, and group 2 of part XI of schedule 1 to, the Statute Law (Repeals) Act 1993, which came into force on 5 November 1993.

== See also ==
- Corrupt practices
- Corrupt Practices Act 1695
- Corrupt and Illegal Practices Prevention Act 1883
- List of UK parliamentary election petitions
- Reform Acts
- Representation of the People Act
