= Corrupt practices =

Corrupt practices in United Kingdom election law are practices related to an election which, if a person of is found guilty of them by an election court, may cause the election to be declared void, vacate the elected office(s), and/or impose legal incapacities on the guilty parties. Some are additionally criminal offences. They include bribery, treating, undue influence, personation, and aiding, abetting, counselling and procuring personation.

== History ==
The Corrupt Practices Prevention Act 1854 (17 & 18 Vict. c. 102) introduced the category of 'corrupt practices' to UK law, although statutes for the prevention of specific offences had been passed in 1416, 1695, (Note: See Corrupt Practices Act 1695.) 1729, 1809, 1827, 1829, and 1842. The Act was supplemented, modified, amended or extended by later legislation, for example the Parliamentary Elections Act 1868 and the Corrupt and Illegal Practices Prevention Act 1883.

== Definition ==
Corrupt practices are now defined by the Representation of the People Act 1983 and include:

- personation, defined as pretending to be another person (whether living, dead or fictitious) in order to vote in their name
- applying for a postal vote in the name of another person, or diverting the delivery of a postal vote form
- giving false information in the papers nominating a candidate
- incurring unlawful expenses in connection with an election campaign, or making a false declaration regarding election expenses
- bribing voters to vote or not to vote (with money, or other valuable items)
- treating, defined as giving or offering food, drink or entertainment to a voter in order to influence their vote
- exerting undue influence on a voter through threats (including threats of "spiritual injury" as well as physical injury, damage or harm), whether to influence their vote or as a result of their voting

The result of an election can be challenged on the grounds that corrupt practices have taken place by the presentation of an election petition to the courts within the period of 21 days after the date of the election. If the election court which hears the petition determines that a corrupt practice has taken place, it issues a report finding the relevant individuals guilty. A candidate may be reported as personally guilty if they were directly involved with the corrupt practice, or if it was committed with their knowledge or consent. A candidate may also be reported as "guilty by his agents" where his election agent or those working on his campaign commit corrupt practices.

== Sanctions ==
The sanctions for corrupt practices fall into two broad categories: non-criminal sanctions, and criminal punishments. The reporting, by an election court, of a person as guilty of a corrupt practice renders them immediately liable to the non-criminal sanctions, and they may additionally be prosecuted and subjected to the criminal punishments (but if they are prosecuted and acquitted, then the non-criminal sanctions are revoked). Where the election was not challenged by a petition at the time, but suspected corrupt practices are subsequently identified, a criminal prosecution can be instigated (but only within one year of the election concerned), and anyone found guilty is subject to both criminal punishment and the non-criminal sanctions.

=== Non-criminal sanctions ===
The successful election of a candidate found guilty (whether personally or by his agents) of a corrupt practice is void, and anyone found personally guilty of a corrupt practice is prohibited from holding any elected office (and for some offences, also from voting in any election) for a period of five years. In addition, if the offender is a solicitor, barrister, advocate or member of another regulated profession (such as a medical doctor) then the offence is also reported to the appropriate regulatory body which is empowered to deal with it as if it were professional misconduct, and thus could result in suspension or being struck off their professional register. If an election court finds that someone with a licence for the sale of alcohol allows bribery or treating to take place on his premises, they can also report the matter to the licensing authority which may consider it grounds to refuse to renew the licence.

=== Criminal punishment ===
Conviction of a corrupt practice in the criminal courts can result in imprisonment for up to two years (depending on the offence) or an unlimited fine.

== Recent cases ==
One of the most high-profile cases of corrupt practices in recent years was that of the local government elections in the Bordesley Green and Aston wards of Birmingham in June 2004. The election court, presided over by Richard Mawrey QC, found that there had been extensive abuse of the postal vote system, resulting in the outcome of the election being changed. He accordingly reported that extensive corrupt practices had been committed, found six individuals personally guilty (although one was subsequently cleared by the Court of Appeal), and voided the elections.

Following the 1997 general election, Fiona Jones, who had been elected as Member of Parliament for Newark, and her election agent were initially tried and convicted of making a false declaration regarding election expenses. However, the conviction was overturned on appeal.

== See also ==
- Bribery
- "Corrupt practices" is used more broadly in American criminal law to describe predicate crimes underlying racketeering (Racketeer Influenced and Corrupt Organizations Act (RICO)), bribery, and U.S. election law.
- Election law
- List of UK parliamentary election petitions
- Political corruption
- Reform Acts
- Representation of the People Act
