= List of mayors of Tower Hamlets =

The Mayor of Tower Hamlets was a position first established in 1965 with the creation of the London Borough of Tower Hamlets. It replaced the mayors of Bethnal Green, Poplar and Stepney.

The post holder is elected at a full council meeting in May of each year, and serves for one municipal year. From 1965, the mayor could be a councillor or alderman, until the position of alderman was abolished in 1978. It is customary for the mayor to have served as the deputy mayor in the preceding year.

In 2010, a directly elected mayor of Tower Hamlets was established. The civic mayor position was renamed as the Chair of Council in October 2010 and Speaker of Council in November 2011.

== Mayor ==
- 1965 T. H. A. Mitchell
- 1966 Ald J. Orwell (Note: Known as John Orwell (Bethnal Green))
- 1967 M. J. Durell
- 1968 F. W. Briden
- 1969 E. G. Walker
- 1970 Ald J. Orwell (Note: Known as John Orwell (Stepney))
- 1971 W. Harris
- 1972 Ald H. F. Rackley
- 1973 G. T. Desmond
- 1974 G. R. Chaney
- 1975 B. Holmes
- 1976 D. Kelly
- 1977 J. Riley
- 1978 A. S. Dorrell
- 1979 E. Armsby
- 1980 L. Crook
- 1981 P. Thompson
- 1982 J. C. O'Neill
- 1983 E. D. Penner
- 1984 R. W. Ashkettle
- 1985 P. Beasley
- 1986 B. Williams
- 1987 B. Williams
- 1988 B. C. Duffy
- 1989 J. A. Shaw
- 1990 J. Ludlow
- 1991 B. A. Blandford
- 1992 K. B. Appiah
- 1993 J. Snooks
- 1994 A. Downes
- 1995 G. Mortuza
- 1996 A. Jacob
- 1997 J. Ramanoop
- 1998 A. Asad
- 1999 D. Jones
- 2000 Soyful Alom
- 2001 L. Melvin
- 2002 S. Ullah
- 2003 Abdul Aziz Sardar
- 2004 Manir Uddin Ahmed
- 2005 Doros Ullah
- 2006 Shafiqul Haque
- 2007 Ann Jackson
- 2008 Mohammed Abdus Salique
- 2009 Ahmed Omer
- 2010 Motin Uz-Zaman

== Chair of Council ==
- 2010 Motin Uz-Zaman
- 2011 Mizan Chaudhury

== Speaker of Council ==
- 2011 Mizan Chaudhury
- 2012 Rajib Ahmed
- 2013 Lesley Pavitt
- 2014 Mohammed Mukit
- 2015 Marc Francis
- 2016 Khales Uddin Ahmed
- 2017 Sabina Akhtar
- 2018 Ayas Miah
- 2019 Victoria Obaze
