= Rene Claudel Mugenzi =

British politician (born 1976)

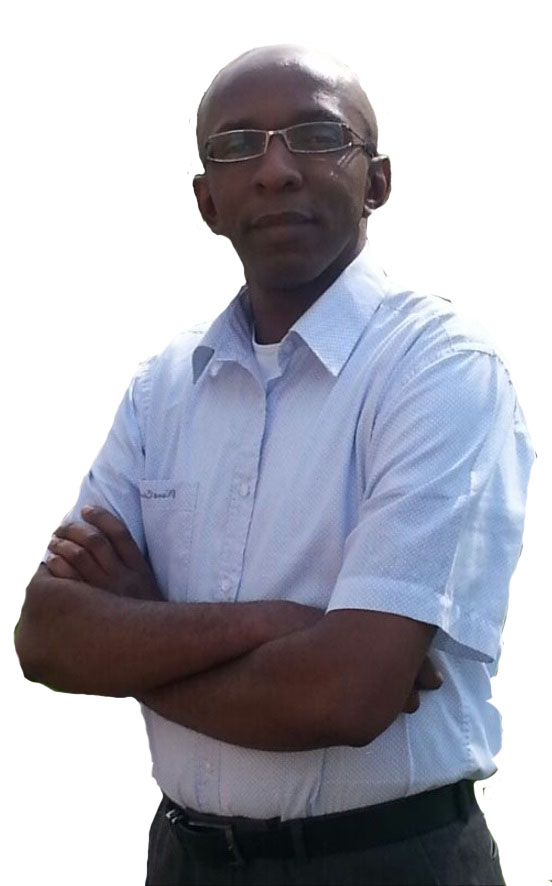
- Rene Mugenzi in April 2015

Personal details
- Born: 13 April 1976 (age 50) Pyatigorsk, Russia
- Education: King's College London

Rene Claudel Mugenzi (born 13 April 1976) is a British author, physicist community and social development practitioner, human rights activist, community organiser, Astrophysicist and politician.

He stood as a Parliamentary candidate for Poplar and Limehouse in The United Kingdom General Election of 2015 which was held on 7 May 2015. He represented the Red Flag Anti-Corruption political party.

== Early life and education ==
Rene Mugenzi was born in Pyatigorsk, Russia to Rwandan parents. He grew up in Kigali Rwanda until age of 18 when he left his native country fleeing genocide and massacres. In 1997, at the age of 21, he moved to the UK, where he has been living since.

He studied physics and astrophysics in King's College London. He also studied organising for social and community development at London Metropolitan University.

Mugenzi is a fluent speaker of English, French, Swahili and Kinyarwanda.

== Community and social development work ==
Mugenzi was a community support and social innovation development executive. He has been granted Lifetime Membership of the Millennium Awards Fellowship and was nominated as a Tower Hamlets community hero, in recognition of his achievements in contributing in improving the quality of lives of local people, through developing and empowering innovative community development projects and services. Mugenzi has also won various community awards such as Community Champion and UnLtd awards.

Mugenzi has developed and taught various community support methods and social innovation development for community, voluntary and statutory sector. As a social and community development practitioner, he has worked in addressing various social challenges within underprivileged communities particularly in East London.

Rene Mugenzi has developed award-winning social innovation initiatives that have been used in various poverty alleviation and community development projects in the UK and abroad. He has designed various capacity building training for social and community development workers.

He is the founder of the British Grassroots Action Awards, a national award giving initiative that recognises innovative and successful grassroots-based initiatives that have made significant impact in the lives of their service users.

Mugenzi is also the founder and chairman of the London Centre for Social Impact, a UK social innovation development organisation and think tank.

== Political and human rights activities ==
Mugenzi has been involved in UK politics particularly in relation to social policy development and social justice campaigns. In 2010, he stood as a candidate in a local election in Thamesmead Moorings ward within Royal Borough of Greenwich for the Liberal Democrats.

Mugenzi stood as the Parliamentary Candidate for Poplar and Limehouse representing the Red Flag Anti-Corruption political party in the 2015 UK general election.

As an international human rights activist, Rene has frequently criticized foreign governments that abused human rights. He has a particular interest in Rwanda, Democratic Republic of Congo, Myanmar (Burma) and Iraq.

In May 2011, Mugenzi was informed by the Scotland Yard, that they had discovered a plot to assassinate him by the Rwandan government. He was put under protection and the UK government warned the Rwandan government against trying to assassinate its citizens on its soil. The Rwandan government denied those allegations.

Mugenzi has spoken at various national and international conferences and events on issues of human rights and freedoms.

== Publications ==
- Strategic Planning for Sustainability – A practical guide for social enterprises
- Enabling Social Mobility in London: Effective ways to facilitate social ladder climbing
- Sustainable Social Outcomes at the Grassroots: Effective Grant making methods and social investment to community-based organisations
- Community Development and Leadership at the Grassroots Level: A tool-kit for councillors
- Strategic Planning in Social Actions: A guide for not for profit organisations
- Financial Control and Accountability: A practical guide to not for profit organisations
- Astrophysics and Cosmology: An introduction course for experimental particle physicists
