= Lutfur Rahman (British politician) =

British politician

- লুৎফুর রহমান
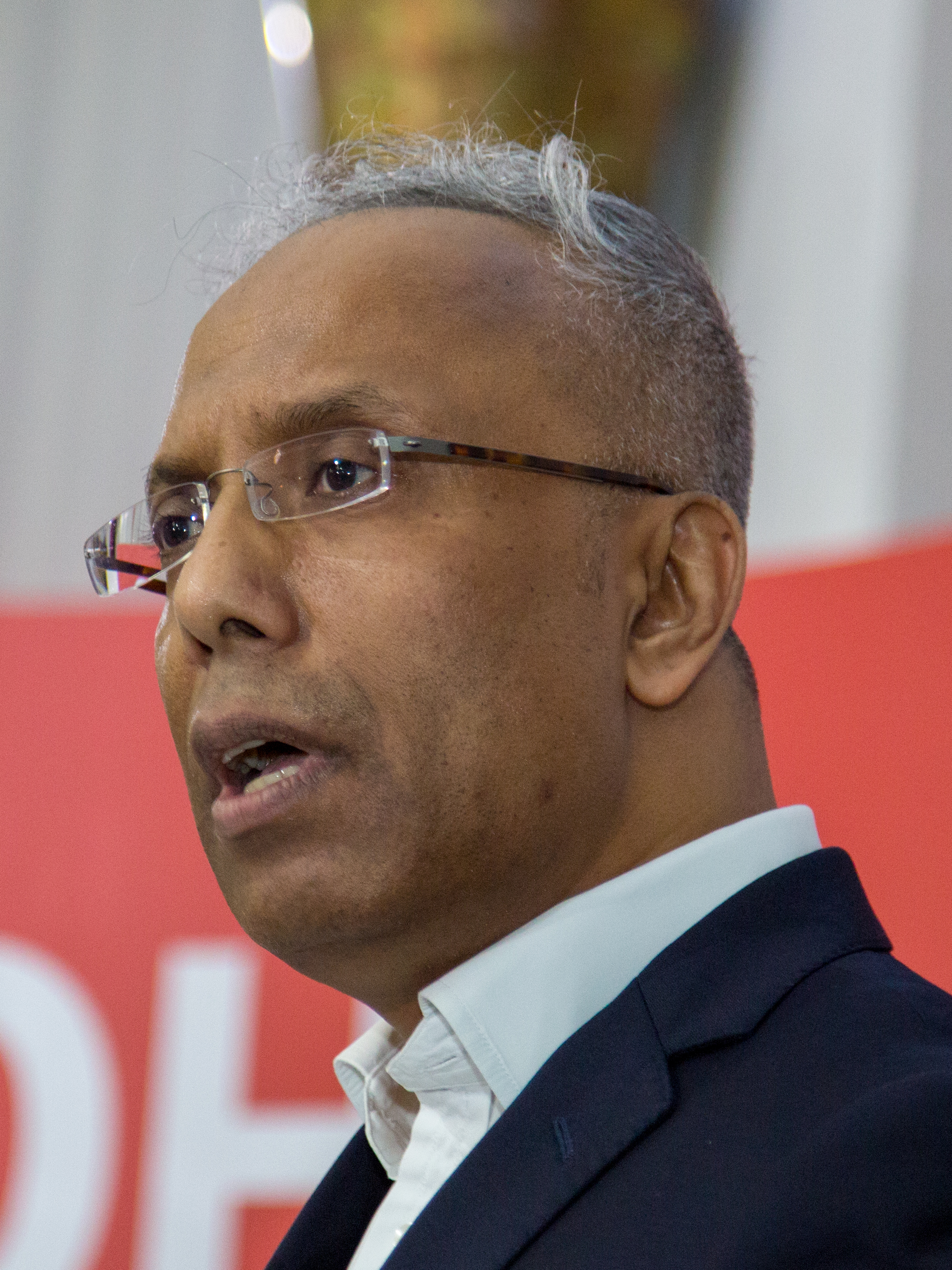
- Rahman in 2018

1st and 3rd Mayor of Tower Hamlets
- Incumbent
- Assumed office 9 May 2022
- Preceded by: John Biggs
- In office 25 October 2010 – 23 April 2015
- Preceded by: Office established
- Succeeded by: John Biggs

Leader of Tower Hamlets First
- In office 18 September 2013 – 23 April 2015
- Preceded by: Denise Jones
- Succeeded by: Helal Abbas

Personal details
- Born: Mohammed Lutfur Rahman; 12 September 1965 (age 61) Balaganj, Sylhet, East Pakistan (now Bangladesh)
- Party: Aspire (since 2018)
- Other political affiliations: Labour (2002–2010); Independent (2010–2013); Tower Hamlets First (2013–2015)
- Profession: Politician

Mohammed Lutfur Rahman (Bengali: মোহাম্মদ লুৎফুর রহমান; born 12 September 1965) is a British politician serving as the Mayor of the London Borough of Tower Hamlets for the Aspire party since 2022, having previously held the post from 2010 to 2015.

Lutfur Rahman was the leader of Tower Hamlets London Borough Council from 2008 to 2010 for the Labour Party, and was initially selected as that party's candidate for the 2010 mayoral election. After links with Islamic Forum of Europe and of signing up ineligible voters for the selection process, he was removed as Labour's candidate, and left the party to contest and win the election as an independent candidate.

He was re-elected at the 2014 mayoral election as the candidate for Tower Hamlets First, but the result of this election was declared null and void on 23 April 2015 when an election court officially reported Lutfur Rahman to be "personally guilty" of "corrupt or illegal practices, or both" (electoral fraud) under the Representation of the People Act 1983. He was thus removed from his office with immediate effect and was also personally debarred from standing for elected office until 2021. He was also struck off as a solicitor.

In 2018 he was involved in the founding of a new party, Aspire, and at the May 2022 local elections, following the expiration of his ban, he successfully stood for election to the mayoralty as the Aspire candidate; the party also took the majority of seats on the council.

== Early life and career ==
Lutfur Rahman was born in East Pakistan (now Bangladesh) to Bengali Muslim parents from the village of Sikandarpur in Balaganj, Sylhet District, and moved to the United Kingdom at an early age. He grew up in Tower Hamlets and attended the Marner Primary School in Bow, the Lawdale Junior School in Bethnal Green and Bow School.

Rahman graduated with an LLB (law degree). He was admitted as a member of the Law Society of England and Wales as a solicitor in 1997 after passing the Society's examinations.

Rahman was elected as a Labour Councillor for the Spitalfields and Banglatown ward in 2002 and re-elected in 2006 and 2010. He was part of the leadership of Tower Hamlets Council, serving as Lead Member for Education for two years and, from 2006 to 2007, Lead Member for Culture. In February 2007, Rahman announced his application to be selected as the Labour Party's prospective parliamentary candidate for Bethnal Green and Bow, but when party members voted he came second to Rushanara Ali, who was later elected as the constituency's MP.

Rahman was elected as Leader of the majority Labour Group on Tower Hamlets Council in April 2008, and therefore became Leader of the council, replacing Denise Jones.

After the local elections in May 2010, in which Labour increased the number of their councillors, Rahman was replaced as Leader by Helal Uddin Abbas, in part due to a Channel Four investigation which linked Lutfur Rahman to the Islamic Forum of Europe.

Lutfur Rahman's leadership had come under criticism in June 2009, when he reportedly stated that he had no confidence in Tower Hamlets' Chief Executive, Martin Smith, and told him to "go home and consider your future". The news came on the eve of voting in the European parliamentary elections, which Smith nevertheless attended as the council's returning officer. For his departure, reported to be caused by a personality clash, Smith's terms of employment, negotiated when the council was under the Labour Party leadership of Cllr Denise Jones, entitled him to a payout reported to be between £300,000 and £500,000. The exact reasons and terms of his departure were not made public; Lutfur Rahman characterised it as by mutual agreement.

== Mayor of Tower Hamlets ==
In September 2010, Lutfur Rahman was selected by the Tower Hamlets Labour Party as its candidate to be the first directly elected mayor of Tower Hamlets; however, his candidacy was controversial and his placement on the shortlist of preferred Labour Party candidates was withdrawn on several occasions before it was finally confirmed following legal action on behalf of Lutfur Rahman.

He was finally elected as Labour's Mayoral candidate by Tower Hamlets Borough Labour Party members receiving 433 votes, compared to John Biggs with 251 votes and Helal Abbas with 157 votes. He was declared as the winning candidate by Ken Clark, Director of London Regional Labour Party. However, after allegations that he was closely linked to an alleged Islamic fundamentalist group, the Islamic Forum of Europe, and that he had personally signed up fake members in order to win the selection, he was removed as Labour's candidate by the Labour Party's National Executive Committee and replaced by the 'third man' Helal Uddin Abbas. Later, in 2011, a Labour Party investigation report stated that 16 members not registered in the constituency had participated in the selection, but which candidate they voted for was not known, and in any event these would not have changed the outcome of the selection process.

He was at first said to be considering urgent legal action to be reinstated by Labour, but declared on 23 September 2010 that he would stand as an independent candidate. The Respect Party declared its support for Lutfur Rahman and George Galloway praised him.

He was elected with over 51% of the vote receiving 23,283 votes. Labour's candidate came second with 11,254, Conservative 5,348, Liberal Democrat 2,800, Green 2,300. He became Britain's first Muslim executive mayor.

A Labour councillor described Lutfur Rahman's campaign as "a hugely well-financed operation", but Lutfur Rahman stated he had met all his own costs from his earnings as a solicitor, including the launch event at the Troxy and the printing of election leaflets.

Lutfur Rahman invited councillors from mainstream parties to join his cabinet, but only five did so, all former Labour members. In February 2011 a Guardian blog report covering his early performance as Mayor concluded that he had proved "highly adept at political jujutsu – drawing strength from his enemies' attack", including unfair branding of the borough as "Islamist" in the tabloids, and was working with the local Labour MPs to resist the Government's cuts.

Lutfur Rahman had a radical agenda, with a promise to build 1,000 homes a year, ring-fence frontline services, keep social care free and universal, and pay the living wage. He introduced universal free school meals in primary schools and commissioned a new town hall in a former hospital.

=== Tower Hamlets First ===
He was re-elected at the 2014 mayoral election, which had a turnout of nearly twice that of the 2010 election. He represented the new political party Tower Hamlets First, of which he was the leader. The election has since been declared void, with Lutfur Rahman reported personally guilty and guilty by his agents of making false statements of fact about another candidate's personal conduct or character, of administering council grants in a way which constituted electoral bribery, and of spiritual intimidation of voters. He was also reported guilty by his agents of personation, postal vote fraud, fraudulent registration of voters, and illegal payment of canvassers.

== Controversies ==
=== Channel 4 Dispatches documentary ===
Andrew Gilligan in a Channel 4 Dispatches documentary in March 2010, and in a series of Daily Telegraph blogs and articles, accused Lutfur Rahman of achieving the council leadership with the help of the Islamic Forum of Europe. The IFE was accused by the local Labour MP, Jim Fitzpatrick, of infiltrating the council and the Labour Party. Gilligan also claimed that during Lutfur Rahman's leadership of the council, millions of pounds of public money were paid to organisations run by the IFE, and that the results included stocks of extremist literature being made available in public libraries. However, Lutfur Rahman denied in October 2010 that he was in league with the IFE. The IFE issued a statement denying Lutfur Rahman was a member and stating that Abbas, Labour's replacement candidate, had also had public and private meetings with the IFE. In 2011, Lutfur Rahman complained to the Press Complaints Commission about his description by Gilligan and the Telegraph as "extremist-backed" and as having "close links" to the IFE. The Commission rejected the complaint, saying that the description was "not misleading."

Subsequently, in the 2015 election court hearing where this issue was considered, the judge determined the court had "not heard a shred of credible evidence linking Mr Rahman with any extreme or fundamentalist Islamist movement."

=== Allegations of financial irregularities in electioneering ===
Conservative councillor Peter Golds asked the police and the Electoral Commission to investigate Lutfur Rahman for alleged undeclared donations from Brick Lane restaurateur Shiraj Haque to fund Lutfur Rahman's legal action against the Labour Party. Interviewed for The Guardian in October 2010, Lutfur Rahman dismissed the complaint and insisted that, like the electoral campaign, he meets all his own expenses and legal costs. Subsequently, the Press Complaints Commission upheld a complaint by Lutfur Rahman against Andrew Gilligan for repeating these allegations in The Daily Telegraph without stating that the police had decided that there was no case to answer, causing the reporting to be "inaccurate and misleading".

=== Office and car spending ===
In 2011, Lutfur Rahman was reported to have spent £115,000 on office extensions at Mulberry Place, which opponents described as a "vanity project". The project increased the office space available for the new directly elected mayor, the council cabinet, and opposition parties. Later that year it was reported that Lutfur Rahman had hired a Mercedes-Benz E-Class at a cost of £72 a day, and was chauffeur-driven by council staff. He was criticised for not using public transport or his own car as other mayors did.

=== Attempt to sell Henry Moore sculpture ===
In November 2012, Lutfur Rahman overruled the recommendation of his councillors that Henry Moore's Draped Seated Woman 1957–58, donated by the artist on the understanding that it would be permanently available for public appreciation in a socially deprived area of London, should not be sold. Rahman said the money raised would ease the £100m budget cut that Tower Hamlets faced over the next three years. Council officers had recommended the work should be sold, as there was no safe council property to locate it, making it uninsurable.

The London Borough of Bromley claimed the statue, because, although it was in Tower Hamlets, when the Greater London Council (GLC) and subsequent London Residuary Body had been dissolved, all remaining GLC assets – including the sculpture – had been given to Bromley. Bromley did not want it sold. The matter was taken to the High Court, who ruled that Tower Hamlets had committed an act of conversion by lending the sculpture to the Yorkshire Sculpture Park in 1997 and that Bromley's title to the sculpture was therefore extinguished under the Limitation Act 1980. The sale was interrupted by Rahman's removal from office, and his successor John Biggs subsequently cancelled the sale and put the sculpture on display.

=== Testimonials for individuals with convictions ===
Lutfur Rahman apologised for providing a court character reference for the convicted sex offender Zamal Uddin, stating that he had been misled by the defendant's family. In 2014, Lutfur Rahman provided a "glowing" court reference to Mahee Ferdous Jalil, a convicted insurance fraudster who was subsequently sentenced to three years in jail for money laundering.

=== Panorama documentary ===
In March 2014, just weeks before council elections in Tower Hamlets, the BBC aired a Panorama programme making serious allegations about his suitability for office.

The Panorama documentary, presented by John Ware, alleged that:

- Lutfur Rahman diverted over £3.6 million of grants to charities run by Bangladeshis and Somalis in return for political support.
- The council had paid money to Channel S, a local Bangladeshi TV channel, and one of its reporters, in return for politically biased coverage.
- A council-funded local newspaper was also strongly politically biased.

The documentary also alleged that Lutfur Rahman had failed to answer questions at ten council Overview and Scrutiny meetings. The programme featured Communities Secretary Eric Pickles, who subsequently sent fraud investigators in for a full investigation. The Times reported: "A beleaguered mayor raised the spectre of civil war in his borough as government inspectors swooped on his offices hunting for evidence of fraud, favours and unlawful spending."

On 16 April 2014, the Metropolitan Police said there was "no credible evidence of criminality" to substantiate allegations made against Lutfur Rahman, so they would not carry out an investigation at that stage.

Andrew Gilligan, writing in The Daily Telegraph, later reported that the police were in the early stages of investigating an alleged fraud involving a grant to the Brady Youth Forum, and claimed that the local police had a "cosy relationship with Lutfur’s council". The police issued a statement that the council had referred the Brady Youth Forum to the police for investigation, and this investigation pre-dated the Panorama documentary.

== Removal from office ==
Lutfur Rahman's re-election as Mayor of Tower Hamlets in 2014 was challenged by four residents of the borough in an election petition under the Representation of the People Act 1983. They alleged that people had voted who were not entitled to, and promises of housing were given to certain sections of the community in return for their vote. Lutfur Rahman sought unsuccessfully to strike out the case, but did persuade the High Court to order the petitioners to produce further particulars of what was alleged. These further details were supplied to the court by 18 August.

After a trial lasting 30 days, on 23 April 2015, Lutfur Rahman was found in a civil finding personally guilty of corrupt and illegal practices. Lutfur Rahman and his supporters were found to have used religious intimidation through local imams and vote-rigging, as well as falsely branding his Labour rival a racist to gain power.

The election of May 2014 was declared void, and Lutfur Rahman was disqualified from holding electoral office for five years. The ruling meant that Lutfur Rahman was ineligible to run for re-election, and he was ordered to pay immediate costs of £250,000. Labour won the subsequent by-election, defeating the independent candidate backed by Lutfur Rahman. Lutfur Rahman was unable to pay the costs involved and was declared bankrupt. The Crown Prosecution Service decided there was insufficient evidence for a criminal prosecution.

The Department for Communities and Local Government investigation, instigated by Communities Secretary Eric Pickles and carried out by PricewaterhouseCoopers, found a "culture of cronyism" but no fraud at the council. Pickles determined the council was not meeting its "Best Value duties", and sent in commissioners to run the council's grant-making system and approve any disposals of council property until March 2017.

On 20 December 2017 the Solicitors Disciplinary Tribunal found the charges brought against Lutfur Rahman to be proven. These included: (1) failing to uphold the rule of law and administration of justice, (2) failing to act with integrity and (3) failing to behave in a way that maintains the trust the public places in him and in the provision of legal services. He was struck off the Roll of Solicitors, and ordered to pay £86,400 costs.

== Aspire party and re-election ==
Lutfur Rahman remained active in Tower Hamlets politics. While barred from holding elected office, he was behind the formation of the Aspire party in February 2018, which included most of the former Tower Hamlets First councillors. None of them were re-elected in the 3 May 2018 elections, but one was subsequently elected in a 2019 by-election.

In November 2020, it was reported that Lutfur Rahman was poised to return to local politics by campaigning to retain the mayoral system in the London Borough of Tower Hamlets. In 2022, he stood as a candidate in the mayoral election in Tower Hamlets and won in the second round with 54.9%. In the Borough Council elections held on the same day, Aspire candidates won 24 of the 45 seats and therefore a majority, reducing the Labour Group to 19 members.

In November 2022, Lutfur Rahman was in dispute with residents concerning the removal of structures placed in line with an experimental traffic order which restrict traffic primarily outside schools. Tower Hamlets' public realm team recommended to Lutfur Rahman that the school streets scheme should stay, but Lutfur Rahman, in accordance with a manifesto promise to “reopen” streets, allowed the temporary scheme to lapse.

In February 2023, the Chief Executive of the Chartered Institute of Public Finance and Accountancy (CIPFA) raised the prospect of the authorities having to intervene in the mismanagement of the council under Lutfur Rahman.

In April 2023 Transport for London (TfL) announced the withholding of £1 million of annual funding if Lutfur Rahman followed through on a manifesto commitment to end the borough's Low Traffic Neighbourhood schemes.

== See also ==
- British Bangladeshi
- Directly elected mayors in England
- List of British Bangladeshis

Civic offices
Preceded by Motin Uz-Zaman	Mayor of Tower Hamlets; 25 October 2010 – 23 April 2015	Succeeded by John Biggs
