= Tower Hamlets London Borough Council =

Local authority in London, England

- Coat of arms

- Council logo

Type
- Type: London borough council of the London Borough of Tower Hamlets
- Houses: Unicameral

History
- Founded: 1 April 1965

Leadership
- Speaker: Musthak Ahmed, Aspire since 20 May 2026
- Mayor: Lutfur Rahman, Aspire since 9 May 2022
- Chief Executive: Steve Halsey since February 2023

Structure
- Seats: 45 councillors plus elected mayor
- Graph of the party split among 45 seats.
- Political groups: Administration (33) Aspire (33) Other parties (12) Green (5) Labour (5) Liberal Democrats (1) Conservative (1)
- Length of term: Whole council elected every four years

Elections
- Voting system: Plurality at-large (FPTP)
- Last election: 7 May 2026
- Next election: 2 May 2030

Meeting place
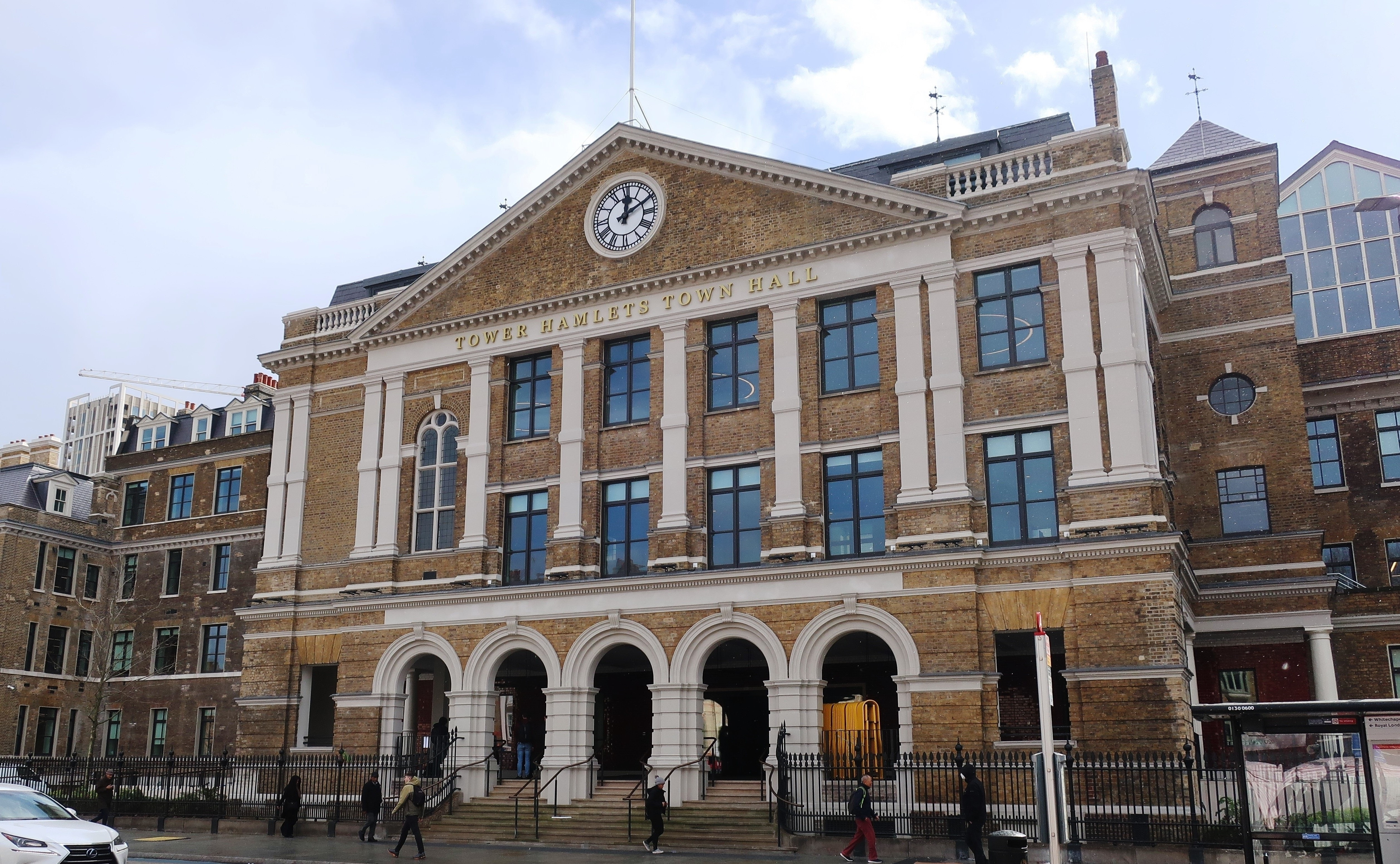
- Tower Hamlets Town Hall; 160 Whitechapel Road, London, E1 1BJ

Website
- www.towerhamlets.gov.uk

Constitution
- Council constitution

Tower Hamlets London Borough Council, also known as Tower Hamlets Council, is the local authority for the London Borough of Tower Hamlets in Greater London, England. The council is responsible for the provision of certain services within the borough. The council has been under the control of local party Aspire since 2022. It has been led by a directly elected mayor since 2010. The council is based at Tower Hamlets Town Hall on Whitechapel Road.

== History ==
The London Borough of Tower Hamlets and its council were created under the London Government Act 1963, with the first election held in 1964. For its first year the council acted as a shadow authority alongside the area's three outgoing authorities, being the three metropolitan borough councils of Bethnal Green, Poplar and Stepney. The new council formally came into its powers on 1 April 1965, at which point the old boroughs and their councils were abolished. The council's full legal name is "The Mayor and Burgesses of the London Borough of Tower Hamlets", but it styles itself Tower Hamlets Council.

From 1965 until 1986 the council was a lower-tier authority, with upper-tier functions provided by the Greater London Council. The split of powers and functions meant that the Greater London Council was responsible for "wide area" services such as fire, ambulance, flood prevention, and refuse disposal; with the boroughs (including Tower Hamlets) responsible for "personal" services such as social care, libraries, cemeteries and refuse collection. The Greater London Council was abolished in 1986 and its functions passed to the London Boroughs, with some services provided through joint committees. Tower Hamlets became a local education authority in 1990 when the Inner London Education Authority was dissolved.

From 1986 to 1994 the council experimented with decentralisation of services to seven neighbourhood areas.

Since 2000 the Greater London Authority has taken some responsibility for highways and planning control from the council, but within the English local government system the council remains a "most purpose" authority in terms of the available range of powers and functions.

In 2008 the council named two tower blocks in Sidney Street as 'Peter House' and 'Painter House' after Peter the Painter, a Latvian anarchist gangster reputedly involved in the Siege of Sidney Street in 1911, whose true identity is not known. Having escaped capture, he had become an anti-hero in the East End. A local councillor and the Metropolitan Police Federation protested against the naming, saying that he should not be honoured.

In 2010, following a referendum, the directly elected role of Mayor of Tower Hamlets was created to serve as the council's political leader. Lutfur Rahman was elected as the first such mayor. He was re-elected in 2014, but the result of that election was declared void the following year in the case of Erlam v Rahman at the Election Court, which reported Rahman and one of the councillors to be guilty of electoral fraud under the Representation of the People Act 1983. He was thus removed from his office with immediate effect and was also barred from standing for elected office until 2021. The police subsequently carried out an investigation into whether criminal charges should be brought against anyone involved regarding the electoral fraud, but concluded that there was insufficient evidence to do so.

Labour's John Biggs won the subsequent mayoral by-election following Rahman's removal in 2015, and retained the post at the 2018 election. Rahman's ban on standing for office expired in 2021, allowing him to contest the mayoralty again in 2022. He stood under the banner of a new local party called Aspire. Rahman defeated Biggs for the mayoralty, and Aspire also won a majority of the seats on the council.

In February 2023, the chief executive of the Chartered Institute of Public Finance and Accountancy (CIPFA) said he had concerns about the management of the council under Aspire and believed that government intervention may be necessary.

== Powers and functions ==
The local authority derives its powers and functions from the London Government Act 1963 and subsequent legislation, and has the powers and functions of a London borough council. It sets council tax and as a billing authority it also collects precepts for Greater London Authority functions and business rates. It sets planning policies which complement Greater London Authority and national policies, and decides on almost all planning applications accordingly. It is also the local education authority.

== Political control ==
The first election was held in 1964, initially operating as a shadow authority alongside the outgoing authorities until it came into its powers on 1 April 1965. The council has been under Aspire majority control since 2022, aside from a brief period of no majority control from November 2024 to December 2024.

Political control of the council since 1965 has been as follows:

Party in control	Years
Labour	1965–1986
Alliance	1986–1988
Liberal Democrats	1988–1994
Labour	1994–2017
No overall control	2017–2018
Labour	2018–2022
Aspire	2022–Nov 2024
No overall control	Nov 2024–Dec 2024
Aspire	Dec 2024–Present

=== Leadership ===
Prior to 2010, political leadership was provided by the leader of the council, with the role of Mayor of Tower Hamlets at that time being largely ceremonial. The leaders from 1965 to 2010 were:

Councillor	Party	From	To
John Orwell	Labour	1965	1974
Paul Beasley	Labour	1974	1984
John Riley	Labour	1984	1986
Eric Flounders	Liberal	1986	1987
Chris Birt	Liberal	1987	1988
Brenda Collins	Liberal Democrats	1988	1990
Eric Flounders	Liberal Democrats	1990	1991
Peter Hughes	Liberal Democrats	1991	1994
John Biggs	Labour	1994	1995
Dennis Twomey	Labour	1995	1997
Michael Keith	Labour	1997	1998
Julia Mainwaring	Labour	1998	1999
Michael Keith	Labour	1999	2001
Helal Abbas	Labour	2001	2005
Michael Keith	Labour	2005	May 2006
Denise Jones	Labour	24 May 2006	21 May 2008
Lutfur Rahman	Labour	21 May 2008	26 May 2010
Helal Abbas	Labour	26 May 2010	21 Oct 2010

In 2010 the council changed to having directly elected mayors with executive powers. To avoid the confusion of having multiple mayors, the old ceremonial role of mayor was renamed as the chair, and was renamed again in 2011 as the speaker. The elected mayors since 2010 have been:

Mayor	Party	From	To
Lutfur Rahman	Independent	25 Oct 2010	25 May 2014
(Lutfur Rahman) (Note: The 2014 mayoral election was declared void on 23 April 2015, triggering a by-election.)	Tower Hamlets First	26 May 2014	23 Apr 2015
John Biggs	Labour	15 Jun 2015	8 May 2022
Lutfur Rahman	Aspire	9 May 2022	

=== Composition ===
Following the 2026 election, the composition of the council (excluding the elected mayor's seat) is:

Party	Seats
Aspire	33
Green	5
Labour	5
Conservative	1
Liberal Democrats	1
Total	45

The next election is due in May 2030.

== Elections ==
Since the last boundary changes in 2014, the council has comprised the elected mayor plus 45 councillors, representing 20 wards, with each ward electing one, two or three councillors. Elections are held for the mayor and councillors together every four years.

== Premises ==
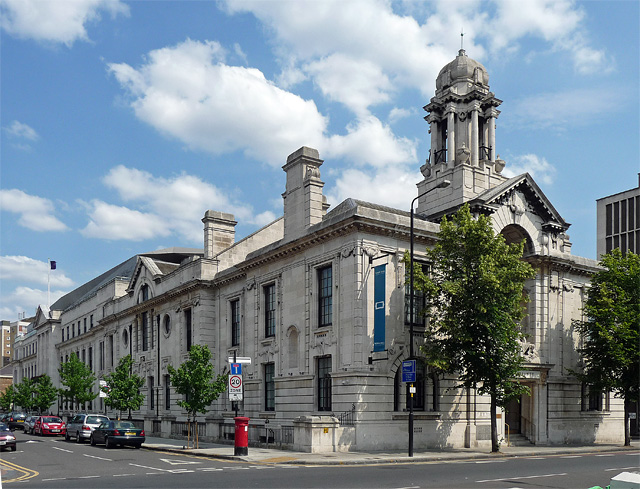
Bethnal Green Town Hall: Council's headquarters 1965–1993

The council is based at Tower Hamlets Town Hall at 160 Whitechapel Road, which was completed in 2023 behind the retained façade of the old Royal London Hospital, which had been built in 1757.

When the council was first created in 1965, it had been based at the old Bethnal Green Town Hall, which had been built in 1910 for Bethnal Green Borough Council. In 1993 the council moved to a new town hall at Mulberry Place in the Blackwall area of the borough, remaining there until 2023.

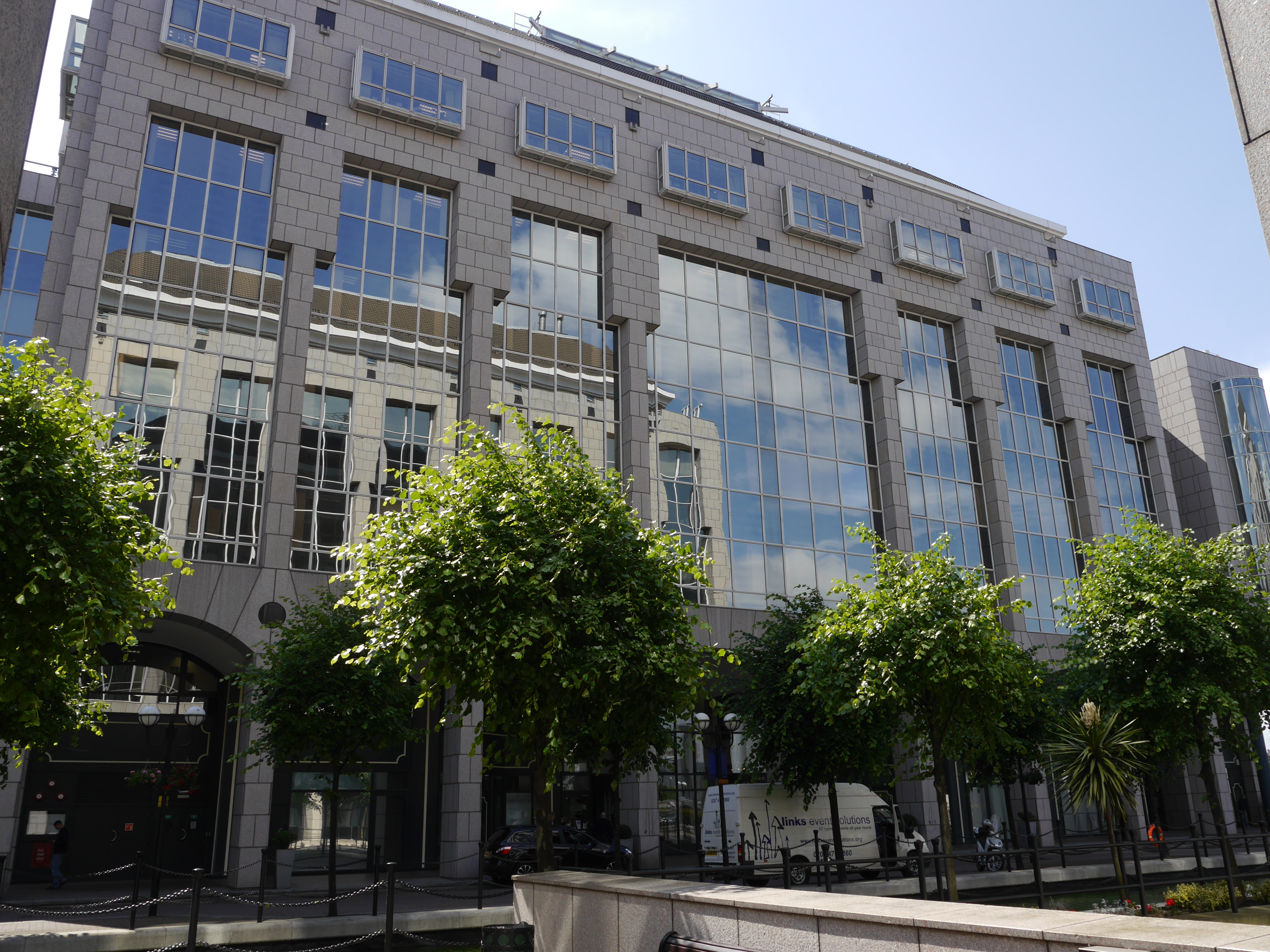
Mulberry Place: Served as town hall 1993–2023

== See also ==
- London Borough of Tower Hamlets
- Mayor of Tower Hamlets
- List of public art in the London Borough of Tower Hamlets
