= Corrupt Practices Act 1695 =

Act of the Parliament of England

- Act of Parliament
- Parliament of England
- Long title: An Act for preventing Charge and Expence in Elections of Members to serve in Parliament.
- Citation: 7 & 8 Will. 3. c. 4
- Territorial extent: England and Wales

Dates
- Royal assent: 21 January 1696
- Commencement: 22 November 1695 (Note: Start of session.)
- Repealed: 10 August 1854
Other legislation
Repealed by	Corrupt Practices Prevention Act 1854
Relates to	Corrupt Practices Act 1868; Corrupt and Illegal Practices Prevention Act 1883

Status: Repealed

Text of statute as originally enacted

The Corrupt Practices Act 1695 (7 & 8 Will. 3. c. 4) or the Treating Act 1695 was an act of the Parliament of England passed in 1696, the long title of which is "An Act for preventing Charge and Expence in Elections of Members to serve in Parliament." It was intended to counter bribery of the electorate at parliamentary elections, and it established that no candidate was to make any "Gift Reward or Entertainment" to a particular person, or a place in general, in order to be elected to serve in Parliament. This included acts by the candidate themselves, on their behalf, or at their expense, and both direct or indirect activity. Any person found guilty of engaging in, promising, or allowing such behaviour was to be considered incapacitated from serving in Parliament, and would not be allowed to take their seat or vote. To all intents and purposes, this would annul their election as a member.

== Subsequent developments ==
The whole act was repealed by section 1 of the Corrupt Practices Prevention Act 1854 (17 & 18 Vict. c. 102), which came into force on 10 August 1854.

== See also ==
- Corrupt practices
- Corrupt Practices Act 1868
- Corrupt and Illegal Practices Prevention Act 1883

== Bibliography ==
- The Law & Working of the Constitution: Documents 1660-1914, ed. W. C. Costin & J. Steven Watson. A&C Black, 1952. Vol. I (1660-1783), p. 83-4.
