= Mayor of Tower Hamlets =

Directly elected mayor of Tower Hamlets London Borough Council

- Coat of arms of Tower Hamlets

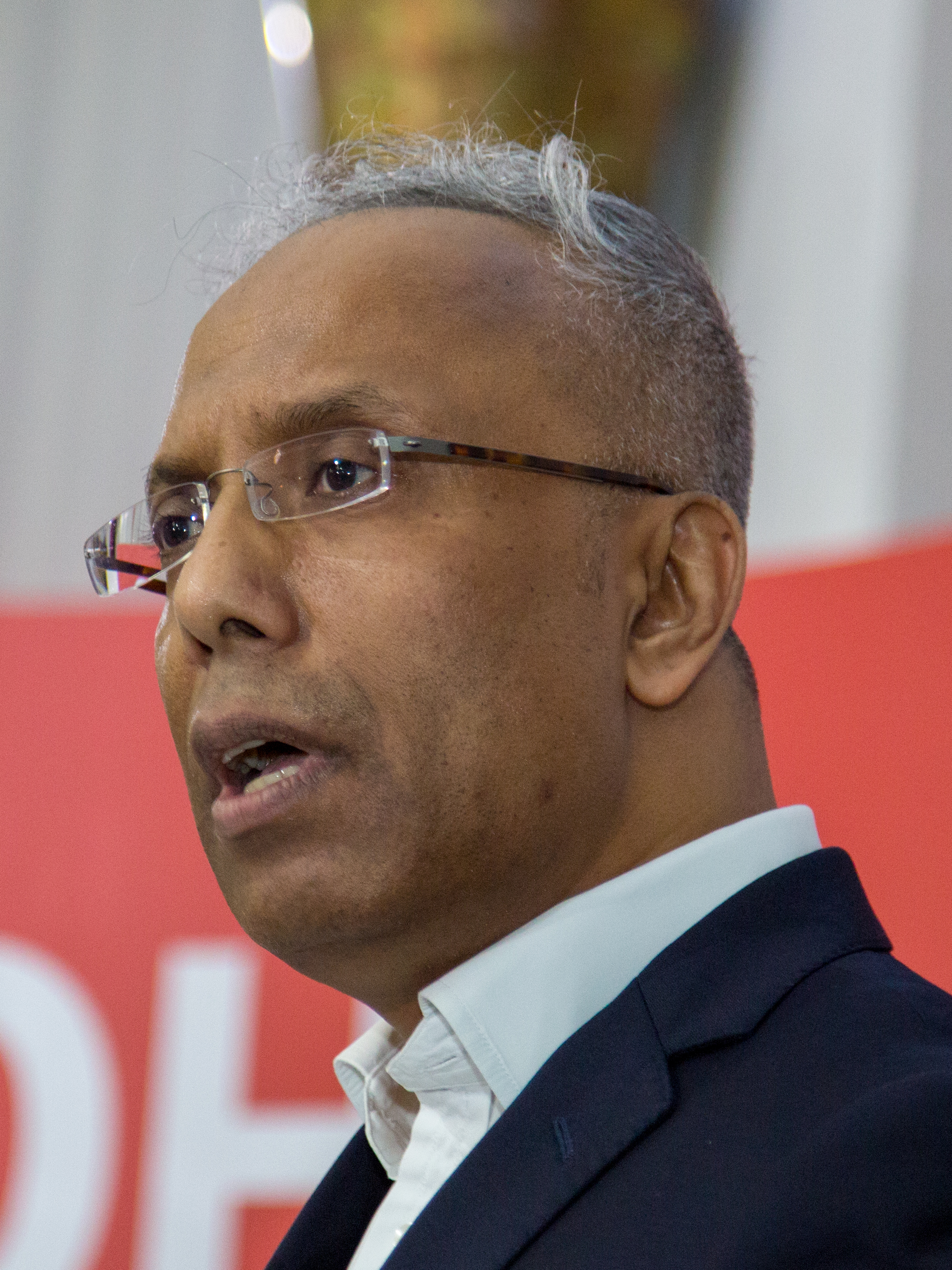
- Incumbent; Lutfur Rahman since 9 May 2022
- Style: No courtesy title or style
- Appointer: Electorate of Tower Hamlets
- Term length: Four years
- Inaugural holder: Lutfur Rahman
- Formation: May 2010 referendum

The mayor of Tower Hamlets is the directly elected local authority mayor of Tower Hamlets London Borough Council in east London, England. The first election for this position occurred on 21 October 2010, taking on the executive function of the borough council. The position is different from the previous largely ceremonial, annually appointed mayors of Tower Hamlets, who became known as the 'Chair of Council' after the first election and are now known as the 'Speaker of Council'. The second election was held on 22 May 2014, the same day as the Tower Hamlets Council election, other United Kingdom local elections, and European Parliament elections, but the election result was declared void by the election court. A by-election was held on 11 June 2015.

== Referendum ==
=== 2010 ===
The proposal to change the status of the borough from one with a leader and cabinet to one with an executive mayor was initially opposed by all the main political parties and was an initiative only proposed and supported by the Respect Party. Islamic Forum Europe organised a petition to trigger a referendum for this change. Council officers stated that almost half the signatures were invalid, with entire pages bearing the same handwriting. Despite the flaws in the petition, there were sufficient valid signatures for the council to accept it, and a referendum was held on 6 May 2010 simultaneously with the voting in the United Kingdom general election. The referendum was passed after an intensive campaign.

Mayor of Tower Hamlets Referendum 6 May 2010
| Choice | Votes | % |
|---|---|---|
| Elected Mayor | 60,758 | 60.39 |
| Cabinet System | 39,857 | 39.61 |
| Total | 100,615 | 100.00 |
| Valid votes | 100,615 | 98.82 |
| Invalid/blank votes | 1,203 | 1.18 |
| Total votes | 101,818 | 100.00 |
| Registered voters/turnout | | 62.1 |
Source: https://democracy.towerhamlets.gov.uk/mgElectionAreaResults.aspx?ID=147&RPID=0

Writing in the Sunday Telegraph on 17 October, Andrew Gilligan represented the forthcoming election as the first big test for the recently elected Labour leader Ed Miliband, given the possibility of an independent candidate defeating the official Labour candidate in a strong Labour borough. Gilligan also said that it raised concerns over the political power of radical Islam in the UK, because of candidate Lutfur Rahman's connections with Islamic Forum Europe. The latter, along with local business interests which had supported the petition and referendum to have a mayor, prominently backed Rahman's campaign. Labour's former London Mayor, Ken Livingstone, also campaigned in support of Rahman, in breach of Labour Party rules.

=== 2021 ===
London Borough of Tower Hamlets Referendum on the Councils Governance Model. 6 May 2021
| Choice | Votes | % |
|---|---|---|
| Keep, By a mayor who is elected by voters. | 63,029 | 77.83 |
| Change, By a leader who is an elected councillor chosen by a vote of the other elected councillors. | 17,951 | 22.17 |
| Total | 80,980 | 100.00 |
| Valid votes | 80,980 | 95.92 |
| Invalid/blank votes | 3,444 | 4.08 |
| Total votes | 84,424 | 100.00 |
Source: https://www.eastlondonadvertiser.co.uk/news/local-council/referendum-result-to-keep-tower-hamlets-mayor-7958210

== Elections ==
=== 2010 ===
The first election took place on Thursday 21 October 2010, with a 25.6 per cent turn out. The new mayor officially took office on Monday 25 October 2010.

Tower Hamlets mayoral election 21 October 2010
| Party | Candidate | 1st round | | 2nd round | | | 1st round votesTransfer votes, 2nd round |
| Party | Candidate | Total | Of round | Transfers | Total | Of round | 1st round votesTransfer votes, 2nd round |
|---|---|---|---|---|---|---|---|
| Independent | Lutfur Rahman | 23,283 | 51.8% | | | | |
| Labour | Helal Uddin Abbas | 11,254 | 25.0% | | | | |
| Conservative | Neil King | 5,348 | 11.9% | | | | |
| Liberal Democrats | John Griffiths | 2,800 | 6.2% | | | | |
| Green | Alan Duffell | 2,300 | 5.1% | | | | |
| Turnout | | 46,719 | 25.60% | Rejected ballots: 1,734 | | | |
| Registered electors | | 182,482 | | | | | |
| Independent win | | | | | | | |

=== 2014 ===
In April 2015, this election was declared void by an election court.

Tower Hamlets Mayoral Election 22 May 2014 (since declared void by an election court)
| Party | Candidate | 1st round | | 2nd round | | | 1st round votesTransfer votes, 2nd round |
| Party | Candidate | Total | Of round | Transfers | Total | Of round | 1st round votesTransfer votes, 2nd round |
|---|---|---|---|---|---|---|---|
| Tower Hamlets First | Lutfur Rahman | 36,539 | 43.38% | 856 | 37,395 | 52.27% | |
| Labour | John Biggs | 27,643 | 32.82% | 6,500 | 34,143 | 47.73% | |
| Conservative | Christopher Wilford | 7,173 | 8.52% | | | | |
| UKIP | Nicholas M^{c}Queen | 4,819 | 5.72% | | | | |
| Green | Chris Smith | 4,699 | 5.58% | | | | |
| Liberal Democrats | Reetendra Banerji | 1,959 | 2.33% | | | | |
| TUSC | Hugo Pierre | 871 | 1.03% | | | | |
| Independent | Reza Choudhury | 205 | 0.24% | | | | |
| Independent | Mohammed Khan | 164 | 0.19% | | | | |
| Independent | Hafiz Kadir | 162 | 0.19% | | | | |
| Turnout | | 86,540 | 47.58% | Rejected ballots: 2,306 | | | |
| Registered electors | | 181,871 | | | | | |
Void election result

=== 2015 by-election ===
After the 2014 election was declared void, a new election was held on 11 June 2015.

Tower Hamlets Mayoral by-election, 2015
| Party | Candidate | 1st round | | 2nd round | | | 1st round votesTransfer votes, 2nd round |
| Party | Candidate | Total | Of round | Transfers | Total | Of round | 1st round votesTransfer votes, 2nd round |
|---|---|---|---|---|---|---|---|
| Labour | John Biggs | 27,255 | 40.00% | 5,499 | 32,754 | 55.39% | |
| Independent | Rabina Khan | 25,763 | 37.81% | 621 | 26,384 | 44.61% | |
| Conservative | Peter Golds | 5,940 | 8.72% | | | | |
| Green | John Foster | 2,678 | 3.93% | | | | |
| Liberal Democrats | Elaine Bagshaw | 2,152 | 3.16% | | | | |
| Red Flag Anti-Corruption | Andy Erlam | 1,768 | 2.59% | | | | |
| UKIP | Nicholas M^{c}Queen | 1,669 | 2.45% | | | | |
| Independent | Hafiz Kadir | 316 | 0.46% | | | | |
| Animal Welfare | Vanessa Hudson | 305 | 0.45% | | | | |
| Independent | Md. Motiur Rahman Nanu | 292 | 0.43% | | | | |
| Turnout | | 69,643 | 37.73% | Rejected ballots: 1,505 | | | |
| Registered electors | | 184,563 | | | | | |
| Labour gain from Independent | | | | | | | |

Councillor Rabina Khan initially announced that she would stand as the Tower Hamlets First candidate. However, as a result of findings in the election court case against Lutfur Rahman, Tower Hamlets First was removed from the register of political parties by the Electoral Commission as the party was not operating a responsible financial scheme and the running of the party did not follow the documentation given in the party's registration. Khan subsequently stood as an independent candidate.

Andy Erlam is a writer and film-maker who led the legal action against Rahman which resulted in the previous election being declared void. He had previously stood elsewhere as a Parliamentary candidate for Labour, then as the first candidate fielded by "Red Flag Anti-Corruption" in the Tower Hamlets Council elections on 22 May 2014. Red Flag Anti-Corruption had also fielded two parliamentary candidates in the 2015 UK general election, Jason Pavlou for Bethnal Green and Bow and Rene Claudel Mugenzi for Poplar and Limehouse, both within Tower Hamlets.

Liberal Democrat Elaine Bagshaw and UKIP candidate Nicholas McQueen both stood for their respective parties in Poplar and Limehouse at the 2015 general election.

=== 2018 ===
Tower Hamlets mayoral election 3 May 2018
| Party | Candidate | 1st round | | 2nd round | | | 1st round votesTransfer votes, 2nd round |
| Party | Candidate | Total | Of round | Transfers | Total | Of round | 1st round votesTransfer votes, 2nd round |
|---|---|---|---|---|---|---|---|
| Labour | John Biggs | 37,619 | 48.43% | 7,246 | 44,865 | 72.66% | |
| PATH | Rabina Khan | 13,113 | 16.88% | 3,765 | 16,878 | 27.34% | |
| Aspire | Ohid Ahmed | 11,109 | 14.30% | | | | |
| Conservative | Anwara Ali | 6,149 | 7.92% | | | | |
| Liberal Democrats | Elaine Bagshaw | 5,598 | 7.21% | | | | |
| Green | Ciaran Jebb | 3,365 | 4.33% | | | | |
| TUSC | Hugo Pierre | 728 | 0.94% | | | | |
| Turnout | | 80,252 | 41.96% | Rejected ballots: 2,571 | | | |
| Registered electors | | 191,244 | | | | | |
| Labour hold | | | | | | | |

John Biggs defended the seat for Labour. Following a split in the former Tower Hamlets First group, Cllr Rabina Khan stood again, as the candidate for her new party, the People's Alliance of Tower Hamlets (PATH) while Cllr Ohid Ahmed stood for Aspire, which emerged from the post-Tower Hamlets First Tower Hamlets Independent Group. The Conservative Party selected Anwara Ali MBE, a local GP and, until 2010, local Labour councillor. The Liberal Democrats selected Elaine Bagshaw, their 2015 candidate. In August 2018, Khan wound up PATH and joined the Liberal Democrats.

=== 2022 ===
Biggs sought to defend his seat for Labour. In January 2022, Liberal Democrat councillor Rabina Khan was announced as the party's candidate for the mayoralty. Independent councillor Andrew Wood, who had resigned from the Conservative group in 2020, announced he would stand for election as both a councillor and mayor. Former mayor of the borough, Lutfur Rahman, announced his candidacy for the Aspire party in February 2022. Rahman's five-year ban from standing for election, having been found guilty by an election court of "corrupt and illegal practices", had elapsed. He was endorsed at his formal campaign launch in March by the former mayor of London Ken Livingstone and the peer Pola Uddin. Rahman won the election with a final vote share of 54.9%, unseating incumbent John Biggs and taking the mayoralty for the second time.

Tower Hamlets mayoral election 5 May 2022
| Party | Candidate | 1st round | | 2nd round | | | 1st round votesTransfer votes, 2nd round |
| Party | Candidate | Total | Of round | Transfers | Total | Of round | 1st round votesTransfer votes, 2nd round |
|---|---|---|---|---|---|---|---|
| Aspire | Lutfur Rahman | 39,533 | 46.99% | 1,271 | 40,804 | 54.90% | |
| Labour Co-op | John Biggs | 27,894 | 33.20% | 5,593 | 33,487 | 45.10% | |
| Liberal Democrats | Rabina Khan | 6,430 | 7.65% | | | | |
| Conservative | Elliott Weaver | 4,269 | 5.07% | | | | |
| Independent | Andrew Wood | 3,985 | 4.74% | | | | |
| TUSC | Hugo Pierre | 1,462 | 1.74% | | | | |
| Independent | Pamela Holmes | 552 | 0.66% | | | | |
| Turnout | | 84,125 | 41.92% | Rejected ballots: 1,864 | | | |
| Registered electors | | 205,189 | | | | | |
| Aspire gain from Labour | | | | | | | |

=== 2026 ===
2026 Tower Hamlets mayoral election*
| Party | Candidate | Votes | % | ±% |
|---|---|---|---|---|
| Aspire | Lutfur Rahman | 35,679 | 38.8 | −8.2 |
| Labour | Sirajul Islam | 19,454 | 21.1 | −12.1 |
| Green | Hirra Khan Adeogun | 19,223 | 20.9 | New |
| Reform | John Bullard | 7,153 | 7.8 | New |
| Conservative | Dominic Nolan | 3,818 | 4.1 | −1.0 |
| Tower Hamlets Independents | Zami Ali | 3,156 | 3.4 | New |
| Liberal Democrats | Mohammed Hannan | 2,421 | 2.6 | −5.1 |
| TUSC | Hugo Pierre | 638 | 0.7 | −1.0 |
| Independent | Terence McGrenera | 524 | 0.6 | New |
| Turnout | | 92,075 | 42.0 | +0.1 |
| Aspire hold | | | | |

*Percentage change is in comparison to First round results from 2022

== List of elected mayors ==
| Political party | Name | Term of office & mandate | | |
|---|---|---|---|---|
| Independent | Lutfur Rahman | 25 October 2010 | 23 April 2015 | 2010 |
| Tower Hamlets First (2013–15) | Lutfur Rahman | 25 October 2010 | 23 April 2015 | |
| Tower Hamlets First (2013–15) | Lutfur Rahman | 25 October 2010 | 23 April 2015 | (2014) (Note: In April 2015 this election was declared void by an election court.) |
| Tower Hamlets First (2013–15) | Lutfur Rahman | 4 years and 181 days | | |
| Labour | John Biggs | 15 June 2015 | 8 May 2022 | 2015 |
| Labour | John Biggs | 15 June 2015 | 8 May 2022 | 2018 |
| Labour | John Biggs | 6 years and 328 days | | |
| Aspire | Lutfur Rahman | 9 May 2022 | Incumbent | 2022 |
| Aspire | Lutfur Rahman | 9 May 2022 | Incumbent | 2026 |
| Aspire | Lutfur Rahman | 4 years and 122 days | | |
