= Corrupt Practices Prevention Act 1854 =

Act of the Parliament of the United Kingdom

Corrupt Practices Prevention Act 1854 (Note: Section 37.)
- Act of Parliament
- Parliament of the United Kingdom
- Long title: An Act to consolidate and amend the Laws relating to Bribery, Treating, and undue Influence at Elections of Members of Parliament.
- Citation: 17 & 18 Vict. c. 102
- Territorial extent: United Kingdom

Dates
- Royal assent: 10 August 1854
- Commencement: 10 August 1854 (Note: The Acts of Parliament (Commencement) Act 1793.)
- Repealed: 23 February 1950

Other legislation
- Amends: See § Repealed enactments
- Repeals/revokes: See § Repealed enactments
- Repealed by: Representation of the People Act 1949

Status: Repealed

Text of statute as originally enacted

The Corrupt Practices Prevention Act 1854 (17 & 18 Vict. c. 102) was an act of the Parliament of the United Kingdom that consolidated enactments relating to bribery, treating, and undue influence at elections of members of parliament in the United Kingdom.

== Provisions ==
=== Repealed enactments ===
Section 1 of the act repealed 10 enactments, listed in schedule A to the act.

| Citation | Short title | Description | Extent of repeal |
|---|---|---|---|
| 7 Will. 3. c. 4 | Corrupt Practices Act 1695 | An Act for preventing Charge and Expense in Elections of Members to serve in Parliament. | The whole act. |
| 2 Geo. 2. c. 24 | Corrupt Practices at Parliamentary Elections Act 1728 | An Act for the more effectual preventing Bribery and Corruption in the Election of Members to serve in Parliament. | All the Act, except the 3d Section, prescribing the Oath to be taken by Returning Officers, and except so far as the Penalties and Provisions of the said Act are applicable to the false taking of such Oath, and the Neglect to take the same. |
| 16 Geo. 2. c. 11 | Parliamentary Elections Act 1742 | An Act to explain and amend the Laws touching the Elections of Members to serve for the Commons in Parliament for that Part of Great Britain called Scotland, and to restrain the Partiality and regulate the Conduct of Returning Officers at such Elections. | So much of the Act as is contained in the 33d Section. |
| 43 Geo. 3. c. 74 | Parliamentary Elections Act 1803 | An Act for further regulating the Administration of the Oath or Affirmation required to be taken by Electors of Members to serve in Parliament by an Act passed in the Second Year of King George the Second, intituled "An Act for the more effectual preventing Bribery and Corruption in the Election of Members to serve in Parliament." | The whole act. |
| 49 Geo. 3. c. 118 | Parliamentary Elections Act 1809 | An Act for better securing the Independence and Purity of Parliament, by preventing the procuring or obtaining of Seats in Parliament by corrupt Practices. | The whole act. |
| 4 Geo. 4. c. 55 | Parliamentary Elections (Ireland) Act 1823 | An Act to consolidate and amend the several Acts now in force, so far as the same relate to the Election and Return of Members to serve in Parliament for Counties of Cities and Counties of Towns in Ireland. | So much of the Act as is contained in the 48th, 79th, and 81st Sections. |
| 7 & 8 Geo. 4. c. 37 | Corrupt Practices at Elections Act 1827 | An Act to make further Regulations for preventing corrupt Practices at Elections of Members to serve in Parliament, and for diminishing the Expense of such Elections. | The whole act. |
| 2 & 3 Will. 4. c. 65 | Representation of the People (Scotland) Act 1832 | An Act to amend the Representation of the People of Scotland. | So much of the 26th Section of the Act and the Schedule (K.) thereto annexed as relates to the Oath or Affirmation against Bribery to be put to any registered Voter at any Poll or Election. |
| 2 & 3 Will. 4. c. 88 | Representation of the People (Ireland) Act 1832 | An Act to amend the Representation of the People of Ireland. | So much of the 54th Section of the Act as relates to administering the Oath or Affirmation against Bribery. |
| 5 & 6 Vict. c. 102 | Bribery at Elections Act 1842 | An Act for the better Discovery and Prevention of Bribery and Treating at the Election of Members of Parliament. | So much of the Act as is contained in the 20th and 22d Sections. |

== Subsequent developments ==
Sections 1, 2 (in part), 3 (in part), 4, 5, 6, 7 (in part), 9, 14, 23, 36, 38 (in part) and 39 of, and schedule A to, the act were repealed by section 66 of, and the fifth schedule to, the Corrupt and Illegal Practices Prevention Act 1883 (46 & 47 Vict. c. 51), which came into force on 15 October 1883.

The whole act was repealed by section 175(1) of, and the ninth schedule to, the Representation of the People Act 1949 (12, 13 & 14 Geo. 6. c. 68), which came into force on 23 February 1950.
