= Election petition =

Process to challenge elections to parliaments

In the United Kingdom and other Commonwealth countries, an election petition is the procedure for challenging the result of a parliamentary election in court.

== Outcomes ==
When a petition is lodged against an election return, there are four possible outcomes:

1. The election is declared void. The result is quashed and a writ is issued for a new election.
2. The election is held to have been undue: the original return is quashed, and another candidate is declared to have been elected.
3. The election is upheld, and the member returned is found to have been duly elected.
4. The petition is withdrawn. This may occur when the petitioner fails to attend a hearing, or when Parliament is dissolved before the petition process is complete.

== History ==
Controverted elections had been originally tried by select committees, afterwards by the Committee of Privileges and Elections, and ultimately by the whole House of Commons, with scandalous partiality, but under the Parliamentary Elections Act 1770 (10 Geo. 3. c. 16), and other later acts, by select committees, so constituted as to form a more judicial tribunal. The influence of party bias, however, too obviously prevailed until 1839, when Robert Peel introduced an improved system of nomination, which distinctly raised the character of election committees; but a tribunal constituted of political partisans, however chosen, was still open to jealousy and suspicion. At length the Parliamentary Elections Act 1868 transferred the trial of election petitions to judges of the superior courts, to whose determination the House gives effect, by the issue of new writs or otherwise. The House, however, still retains and exercises its jurisdiction in all cases not relegated, by statute, to the judges.

Petitions, which resulted in the election in a constituency being held void used to be common after every general election, but are now rare.

When an election was held void the House of Commons could seat another candidate, order a new writ issued to fill the vacancy or leave the writ unissued for a time, thus suspending the representation of a constituency. As the tolerance of corrupt elections became less during the 18th and 19th centuries, boroughs found to be corrupt could be punished by either changing the area and the qualifications for voting or disenfranchising the constituency completely.

Such mechanisms also exist in Hong Kong, formerly a British colony, and in Australia, New Zealand or other Commonwealth nations.

== Cases ==
In 1961, Tony Benn was disqualified from taking up his seat after a by-election by an election court because he held a peerage.

In 1982, Seamus Mallon was disqualified from taking his seat in the Northern Ireland Assembly as he was a member of Seanad Éireann, the upper chamber of the parliament of the Republic of Ireland, at the time of his election.

A recent example of an election being held void was when the 1997 election of Member of Parliament for Winchester, Mark Oaten (Liberal Democrat), was contested by the Conservative Party candidate Gerry Malone. Oaten had won the seat by two votes, with 55 ballot papers rejected by the returning officer for not being stamped properly. Malone lodged an election petition in the High Court to contest the outcome. The petition was dealt with by special case in which Oaten joined. On 6 October 1997 Lord Justice Brooke ruled that the election was void: by a 1974 precedent the failure to stamp the ballots may have been the result of polling station staff forgetting, and had they been counted, Malone would have had a majority of two over Oaten.

Two election petitions were lodged after the general election on 6 May 2010. The defeated independent Rodney Connor, who lost in Fermanagh and South Tyrone by four votes lodged a petition seeking a recount with scrutiny, and the case began on 13 September 2010.

In the Oldham East and Saddleworth constituency, the defeated Liberal Democrat candidate Elwyn Watkins petitioned against the election of Phil Woolas, a former Labour Minister, alleging that the result was affected by false statements of fact about his personal character. The election court which heard the case ordered a re-run of the election in Woolas' constituency after finding him guilty of making false statements against his opponent during the original campaign. Phil Woolas sought a judicial review of the decision in the High Court, but was unsuccessful overall as that Court upheld the decision of the Election Court in relation to two statements, whilst quashing the decision in relation to a third.

In the aftermath of the April 2021 Samoan general election, 28 election petitions were filed. The country's Supreme Court ruled against them.
