= Election court =

UK court adjudicating election disputes

In United Kingdom election law, an election court is a special court convened to hear a petition against the result of a local government or parliamentary election. The court is created to hear the individual case, and ceases to exist when it has made its decision.

== Statutory basis ==
Election courts are governed by the Representation of the People Act 1983. They are overseen by a rota of judges of the High Court (in England and Wales), High Court of Northern Ireland (in Northern Ireland) or Court of Session (in Scotland).

The election court is established following the presentation, to the High Court or Court of Session, of an election petition challenging the result of the election. The constitution of the court differs depending on whether the election being challenged is for a seat on a local council or in Parliament. In the case of a parliamentary election, the court comprises two of the High Court or Court of Session judges who are on the rota. In the case of a local government election in England and Wales, the judges appoint an experienced barrister as a commissioner to hear the case. In the case of a council election in Scotland, the case is heard by one or more sheriffs principal. The Court sits in the parliamentary constituency, or in the local government area, in question. The election court ceases to exist when the case is concluded.

== Procedure ==
The election court tries the petition without a jury, and has all the powers of the High Court or Court of Session. Witnesses give evidence on oath, and a witness is not excused from answering a question even if the answer would incriminate him, although the answer cannot be used against him in any subsequent criminal proceedings (except in the case of a charge of perjury). The trial itself is preceded by 'the scrutiny' in which the ballot papers are examined by an officer of the court (or, in rare cases, by the court itself) in order to establish a factual basis for the trial. The scrutiny may be attended by the parties and their lawyers, who can make representations to the person carrying out the scrutiny.

After the judges trying a petition against the result of a parliamentary election have determined whether the successful candidate was validly elected or not, they issue a certificate of their decision to the Speaker of the House of Commons. If the two judges disagree as to whether the election is valid, the original result of the election stands. In the case of a local government election in England and Wales, the commissioner issues a certificate of their decision to the High Court (in Scotland, the commissioner's determination does not need to be certified to the Court of Session).

In either case, if the election court considers that corrupt practices have taken place during the election, it also issues a report (to the Speaker or the High Court, as the case may be) stating whether it finds any candidate in the election guilty, either personally or by his agents, of corrupt practices. The effect of such a report is that the candidate's election is void (if he had been successful originally), and he is prohibited from holding any elected office for five years; in the case of some corrupt practices he may also be prohibited from voting in any election for the same period.

== Appeal ==
There is no appeal from an election court on a question of fact, but questions of law may be reviewed by the High Court or Court of Session by way of judicial review.

== Recent cases ==
=== Parliamentary ===
Two election petitions were lodged after the general election on 6 May 2010. The defeated Independent Rodney Connor, who lost in Fermanagh and South Tyrone by four votes, lodged a petition seeking a recount with scrutiny, and the case began on 13 September 2010.

In the Oldham East and Saddleworth constituency, the defeated Liberal Democrat candidate Elwyn Watkins petitioned against the election of Phil Woolas, a former Labour minister, alleging that the result was affected by false statements of fact about his personal character. The election court which heard the case ordered a re-run of the election in Woolas' constituency after finding him guilty of making false statements against his opponent during the original campaign. Phil Woolas sought a judicial review of the decision in the High Court, but was unsuccessful overall as that court upheld the decision of the election court in relation to two statements, whilst quashing the decision in relation to a third.

=== Local elections ===
Recent cases in which election courts have ruled on the validity of elections include local government elections:

- for the Aberman South ward of Rhondda Cynon Taf County Borough Council held on 23 November 1995
- for the Bordesley Green and Aston wards of the Birmingham City Council held on 10 June 2004
- for the Aston ward of Birmingham City Council in May 2007
- for the Central Borough ward of Slough Borough Council held on 3 May 2007
- for the Prestatyn North division of Denbighshire County Council held on 3 May 2012
- for the Maybury and Sheerwater ward of Woking Borough Council held on 3 May 2012
- for the Mayoralty of the London Borough of Tower Hamlets, held on 22 May 2014
