= List of UK parliamentary election petitions =

An election petition is a petition challenging the result of an election to a United Kingdom Parliament constituency. The following table lists petitions which were tabled.

== History ==
The first recorded petition challenging an election result was brought by Matthew de Cranthorn in 1318, claiming the sheriff of Devon had made a false return in the county election. From 1318 until 1483 there were very few cases of elections being challenged. Following more boroughs being permitted to return Members of Parliament in the Elizabethan era, challenges were more common, and they peaked with dozens of petitions coming about following the 1865 election.

Initially, petitions were dealt with either by the whole house or ad hoc committees. There were periods where the role was shifted to a defined committee, including the Privileged Committee, but this power went back and forth.

The Elections Petitions Act 1839 abolished the previous committee system, and implemented a new, 6-strong 'General Committee of Elections' appointed by the Speaker of the House. Over the next few decades, this committee had its role strengthened to make it more impartial and expand the allegations to include bribery charges.

The Parliamentary Elections Act 1868 transferred the jurisdiction for considering petitions from the House of Commons to the law courts. The Corrupt and Illegal Practices Prevention Act 1883 substantially altered and strengthened the law in respect of election offences. The current governing law is the Representation of the People Act 1983.

A large number of petitions were held in the Victorian and Georgian periods, when elections were considered 'notoriously corrupt'. By the 1920s, election results were very rarely subject to petitions.

== Results of a petition ==
There are four possible outcomes of a petition trial, named as follows:

- Duly elected: The court upheld the election, and declared the sitting Member the rightful winner.
- Undue election: The court found that the person who was elected had not won the election, but that another candidate had the majority of lawful votes, and therefore declared the other candidate elected.
- Void election: The court found that the election had not been conducted fairly, and annulled the result, meaning that the seat was vacant. Typically a by-election ensued, which is linked from the result. Exceptions, which are noted, were where "general and notorious bribery and corruption" in a borough constituency impelled the House to refuse to move a by-election writ (and in extreme cases to disfranchise the borough, with its territory subsumed into the surrounding county constituency).
- Withdrawn: The judges allowed the petitioner to withdraw the case, and the election result stood. A petitioner might do so to save the expense of further proceedings if the likelihood of victory was small. As petitioners might be induced to withdraw a petition by a further act of corruption, the judges had to give permission on the basis that they were satisfied no corrupt consideration was involved.

== Petitions tabled (1832–1868) ==
The following table lists the number of petitions tabled by their outcome between the 1832 general election, and the passing of the Parliamentary Elections Act 1868. The first column lists the election or by-elections the petitions correspond to. By-election figures are italicised.

Corresponding election(s)	Total petitions	Duly elected	Undue election	Void election	Withdrawn
1832 general election	48	23	10	7	8
1832–34 parliament by-elections	6	3	1	1	1
1835 general election	34	9	7	5	13
1835–37 parliament by-elections	10	4	4	0	2
1837 general election	85	40	13	1	31
1837–41 parliament by-elections	18	10	2	5	1
1841 general election	72	11	14	11	36
1841–47 parliament by-elections	20	6	2	4	8
1847 general election	51	11	1	17	22
1847–52 parliament by-elections	21	4	1	6	10
1852 general election	122	29	2	31	60
1852–57 parliament by-elections	27	7	1	4	15
1857 general election	72	24	1	8	39
1857–59 parliament by-elections	3	0	0	1	2
1859 general election	60	23	0	11	26
1859–65 parliament by-elections	20	6	1	2	11
1865 general election	69	19	2	14	34
1865–68 parliament by-elections (Note: Includes some petitions that took place following the passage of the 1868 Act.)	8	2	1	2	3
Source: F.W.S Craig

== Petitions tried (1868–1910) ==
The following table lists petitions tried following the passing of the Parliamentary Elections Act 1868 until 1910.

=== Glossary (by columns) ===
Allegation

- 'Bribery, etc.' : It was routine for election petitions in the 19th century brought on grounds of bribery also to make accusations of treating and undue influence. Some petitions were apparently written using boilerplate text.
- Personation: One person knowingly voting in the name of another.
- Scrutiny of votes: A process where the votes were recounted, the eligibility of each voter was checked, and ineligible votes struck off.
- Treating: The act of giving free food and drink with intent to persuade the recipient to vote for a particular candidate.
- Undue influence: Any attempt to win votes by threats.

Result

See above. This is also denoted by the colour of the corresponding row.

Details

- Agent: Anyone acting directly or indirectly on behalf of the candidates; not merely the designated election agent but anyone employed by the candidate. Many cases turned on whether a person proved to have carried out illegal activity was an agent (voiding the election) or was acting independently.
- Recriminatory case: Where a petition was presented by a defeated candidate claiming to have been the rightful winner (and not that the election be declared void), it was open to the Respondent to bring forward accusations against their election campaign.
- Relief: If certain aspects of election law have been broken through inadvertence, it is possible for those involved to be relieved from the consequences of breaking the law. The effect of relief is as if the breach of the law never occurred.
- Special case: Where the dispute in an election petition concerned a question of law and not the facts, it was referred to three Judges of the High Court of Justice (England and Wales), the Court of Session (Scotland), or the High Court of Justice in Ireland and its successor the High Court of Northern Ireland.

=== Table of petitions ===
Election (Note: The full date is given for a by-election. For a general election, only the year is given (or year and month where two elections were held in the same year).)	Constituency (Note: The parliamentary constituency for which the election was held.)	Petitioner(s) (Note: The person or people bringing the petition and challenging the election. Typically, supporters of a losing candidate at the constituency election.)	Respondent(s) (Note: The defendant in the case. A person who had been declared elected for the constituency at the election was always a respondent; if procedural irregularity was alleged, the returning officer could be added.)	Allegation ca	Result
1868	Belfast	James M'Tier and Charles Murray Arundell	Thomas McClure	Bribery, etc.	Duly elected
	The Judge did not believe voters who claimed to have been bribed. McClure's campaign had given £200 to support William Johnston's campaign for the other seat, which appeared to be corrupt spending intended to help McClure, but did not fall within the legal definition of bribery.				
1868	Beverley	Luke Hind, John Armstrong and Joseph Dannatt	Sir Henry Edwards and Edmund Hegan Kennard	Bribery, etc.	Void election No by-election. Constituency abolished.
	At least 800 and up to 1,000 people were bribed.				
1868	Bewdley	Charles Sturge and John Baldwin	Sir Richard Atwood Glass	Bribery, etc.	Void election
	Glass's campaign paid for free drink to be provided in 19 or 20 public houses in the borough during the election, and the agent submitted an inaccurate return of election expenses to hide it. Bribery was not proved. There was no evidence that Glass expected this treating.				
1868	Blackburn	John Gerald Potter and Montague Joseph Feilden	William Henry Hornby and Joseph Feilden	Bribery, etc.	Void election
	Allegations of bribery and treating were abandoned, but it was found that workmen in mills in the borough owned by supporters of Hornby and Feilden who supported their opponents, were sacked or prevented from working. Neither candidate nor their agent were responsible; no order as to costs.				
1868	Bodmin	Richard Adams, Abraham Hambly, and James Fell	Hon. Edward Frederick Leveson-Gower	Bribery, etc.	Duly elected
	William Grose did give a meal in Lanivet for supporters of Leveson-Gower, but it was frugal and involved few people, so did not appear to be corrupt treating.				
1868	Bradford (No. 1)	John Haley, Charles Hastings, Angus Holden, Titus Salt Jr.	Henry William Ripley	Bribery, etc.	Void election
	Ripley was found to have given his agent an unlimited bank account, which was used to keep 115 public houses open supplying drink to voters who would vote for Ripley.				
1868	Bradford (No. 2)	Samuel Storey and Thomas Garnett	William Edward Forster	Bribery, etc.	Duly elected
	Evidence of bribery by cash gifts was described by the Judges as "beneath contempt", and while refreshments were provided for campaign workers, this was not corrupt as all of them had always intended to vote for Forster.				
1868	Brecon	Dr. Thomas Prestwood Lucas and Mordecai Jones	Howel Gwyn	Bribery, etc.	Void election
	John New, a spy from the Lucas and Jones's party, had received a bribe from someone known to be an agent of Gwyn.				
1868	Bridgwater	Henry Westropp and Charles William Grey	Alexander William Kinglake and Philip Vanderbyl	Bribery, etc.	Void election No by-election. Constituency abolished 1870.
	It was established that voters had been given cash by Henry Chapman Bussell, who was clearly acting for Kinglake and Vanderbyl.				
1868	Carrickfergus	Robert Torrens	Marriott Robert Dalway	Bribery, etc.	Duly elected
	Assaults on two voters were not part of deliberate intimidation. Food and drink did not appear to be given corruptly. No order as to costs.				
1868	Cashel	Henry Munster	James Lyster O'Beirne	Bribery, etc.; Scrutiny of votes	Void election Borough disfranchised
	O'Beirne was found to have bribed voters under the guise of paying claims from previous elections and room hire charges. A recriminatory case found that Munster had also committed bribery by his agents.				
1868	Cheltenham	James Tynte Agg-Gardner	Henry Bernhard Samuelson	Bribery, etc.	Duly elected
	A prize-fighter had been employed on behalf of Samuelson to intimidate voters, but there was no general riot. Some voters had had their rates paid to qualify them as electors, but it was not proved that Samuelson was responsible.				
1868	Coventry	Thomas Berry Bishop and 31 others	Henry William Eaton and Alexander Staveley Hill	Bribery, etc.	Duly elected
	Eaton's agreement to pay Hill's election expenses was not illegal. Any food and drink was supplied with a total absence of corrupt design. The weight of evidence was against bribery having occurred. No order as to costs.				
1868	Dover	John Helliott	Major Alexander George Dickson	Bribery, etc.	Withdrawn
	Witnesses expected to prove the charges were unbelievable and the Petitioner successfully applied to withdraw the case.				
1868	Drogheda	Sir Francis Leopold M'Clintock	Benjamin Whitworth	Undue influence	Void election
	Whitworth was found to have organised a system of intimidation through the Roman Catholic clergy of the borough.				
1868	Dublin City (No. 1)	Thomas Woodlock and George Foley	Sir Arthur Edward Guinness, Bt.	Bribery, etc.	Void election
	Bribery of 30–40 freemen was proved. 41 voters living outside Dublin were also bribed by promises of payment of their travelling expenses.				
1868	Galway Borough	Thomas M'Govern	Lord St Lawrence and Sir Rowland Blennerhasset, Bt.	Bribery, etc.	Duly elected
	Payments to voters had been reckless but had been voters taking advantage of the candidates rather than bribes. The Roman Catholic clergy had the right to address their congregations on the merits of the candidates. No order as to costs.				
1868	Greenock	William Dougal Christie	James Johnston Grieve	Bribery, etc.; illegal arrangements for polling	Duly elected
	The Sheriff as Returning Officer had taken the advice of the town clerk and polling places were not in accordance with the law, but it did not affect the result. The Judge found the claims of bribed voters to be of no consequence.				
1868	Guildford	William Edward Elkins and others	Guildford Hillier Mainwaring Ellerker Onslow	Bribery, etc.	Duly elected
	Two non-resident voters had had their travel expenses paid but it was not proved that the person sending the money was an agent. Drink was supplied by debating societies, not the candidate. No bribery was shown. No order as to costs.				
1868	Hastings (No. 1)	Edward Barker Sutton and Robert Ransom	Frederick North	Bribery, etc.	Duly elected
	An association set up by North and Thomas Brassey's party to encourage registration of their voters paid the voters for time off to register and gave them refreshments, but this was not bribery or treating when they came to vote many months later.				
1868	Hastings (No. 2)	Somerset Gough-Calthorpe and Clement Arthur Thruston	Thomas Brassey	Bribery, etc.	Duly elected
	Brassey's lavish spending on his household was not illegal even if it intended to influence the election; to be illegal it must aim at a particular vote. The Hastings (No. 1) petition considerations also applied.				
1868	Hereford	Francis Henry Thomas, Josiah Webbe Goldsworthy, and John Cleave	George Clive and John William Shaw Wyllie	Bribery, etc.	Void election
	A breakfast was given by one Harrison for anyone who wanted to have a drink; it was established that he was an agent for Clive and Wyllie, although they were unaware of it.				
1868	Horsham	Robert Henry Hurst	John Aldridge	Scrutiny of votes	Undue election
	The candidates polled the same number of votes and had both been returned even though it was a single-seat constituency. The respondent Aldridge did not defend his claim on the seat.				
1868	King's Lynn	William Armes and George Holditch	Hon. Robert Bourke	Bribery, etc.	Duly elected
	Only one allegation of a bribed voter would require an answer; there the evidence was contradicted.				
1868	Lichfield	Major Hon. Augustus Henry Archibald Anson	Colonel Richard Dyott	Bribery, etc.	Duly elected
	Individual accusations of bribery were made, which did not show organised corruption. The individual cases were unbelievable. One landlord did supply free food in order to create good will for his pub, but not at the instigation of the candidate.				
1868	Limerick City	Daniel Ryan, Thomas M'Knight, Mathew Brennan, Robert Stacpool, Thomas M'Namara, and Denis Grimes	Major George Gavin and Francis William Russell	Bribery, etc.	Duly elected
	No proof of bribery could be found; evidence of refreshments did not show they were given to influence votes. The respondents had summoned a mob, paid by being given £300-£400 of beer, to defend them from what they reasonably suspected to be an attempt to attack them. No order as to costs.				
1868	Londonderry City	David John M'Gown and George David Christie	Richard Dowse	Bribery, etc.	Duly elected
	People employed in the election had been paid wages but had all promised votes to Dowse long before. No evidence was offered to support allegations of intimidation.				
1868	Manchester	Frederic Royse and Charles Wright	Hugh Birley	Disqualification	Duly elected
	Birley was a partner in a company which held two contracts with the Government. One of the contracts had been fully delivered by the time of the election, and although the company had not been paid, it was held to have been a completed and finished contract. Birley did not know of the other contract. Special case.				
1868	Norfolk, Northern	Edward Colman	Hon. Frederick Walpole and Sir Edmund Henry Knowles Lacon, Bt.	Bribery, etc.; employing person reported guilty of corrupt practice	Duly elected
	A man named Preston had previously been reported guilty of corrupt practices but had only chaired public meetings and proposed Lacon as a candidate, which was not illegal. Bribery claims were not made out. A squire had given a dinner to his tenants to celebrate after the election, to increase his influence unconnected with the candidates.				
1868	Northallerton	Jasper Wilson Johns	John Hutton	Bribery, etc.; scrutiny of votes	Duly elected
	The scrutiny confirmed Hutton's victory. Hutton made no corrupt promises, the treating alleged amounted only to a suspicion about a single glass of beer and a cigar, and the intimidation amounted only to a squabble between two people.				
1868	Norwich	Jacob Henry Tillett	Sir Henry Josias Stracey, Bt.	Bribery, etc.; Scrutiny of votes	Void election
	It was proved that a man called Hardiment had bribed voters to support Stracey, and he was definitely an agent. The petitioner did not press his claim to the seat on a scrutiny.				
1868	Oldham	John Morgan Cobbett, Frederick Lowten Spinks, Thomas Evan Lees and John Bentley	John Tomlinson Hibbert and John Platt	Scrutiny of votes	Withdrawn
	Several votes given by wrongly registered electors were struck off; other tendered votes were held good, but after six days the petitioners accepted that Platt had a majority of one vote.				
1868	Penryn and Falmouth	Robert Richard Broad and others	Robert Nicholas Fowler and Edward Backhouse Eastwick	Bribery, etc.	Duly elected
	Voters had not been employed in order to influence their votes; an attempt to prove a deaf voter had been promised a cure if he supported Fowler and Backhouse broke down in court.				
1868	Salford	Roderick Anderson, Jesse Bryant, and Edward Charlton Harding	Charles Edward Cawley and William Thomas Charley	Bribery, etc.; hiring cabs to convey voters to the poll	Duly elected
	The cabs were to convey canvassers to workplaces. The respondents hired a gang of roughs after hearing rumours about Irish interference, which the Judges criticised. 2s. 6d. of bribery by an agent was proved in isolated acts, but this did not upset the election.				
1868	Salisbury	Granville Richard Ryder	Edward William Terrick Hamilton	Votes were cast by people wrongly registered	Duly elected
	Small tenant farmers, whose rates were compounded and paid by their landlords, were entitled to register. Special case.				
1868	Sligo	Michael Foley and Joseph Foley	Major Lawrence Edward Knox	Bribery, etc.	Void election Borough disfranchised
	Proof of bribery of many voters, by a man named Cherry on behalf of Major Knox, was established. There was also a system of intimidation and violence was practiced by large mobs opposed to Knox.				
1868	Southampton	Alfred Pegler	The Rt Hon. Russell Gurney, Q.C. and Peter Merrick Hoare	Bribery, etc.; Scrutiny of votes	Duly elected
	Some voters' sons were employed to help in the election, but this employment was not corrupt. A cabman hired for election day and paid his normal fare was not bribery. The scrutiny and a recriminatory case were abandoned.				
1868	Stafford (No. 1)	Richard Croft Chawner	Colonel Walter Meller	Bribery, etc.	Void election
	An agent of Meller had put names of voters down on a list for payments after the election, if there were funds available. Meller was not personally involved. A recriminatory case established that Chawner had appointed a corrupt agent and was therefore disqualified from election.				
1868	Stafford (No. 2)	Joseph Wile and Thomas Smallman	Henry Davis Pochin	Bribery, etc.	Void election
	Five or six men were deterred from voting by threats of violence from a mob. Pochin was not personally responsible.				
1868	Stalybridge	James Ogden, John Woolley and Abel Buckley	James Sidebottom	Bribery, etc.	Duly elected
	The evidence of treating at two pubs was not trustworthy. There was no evidence that intimidation was instigated by the candidates. One voter was promised a day's wages to vote for Sidebottom, but by two volunteers.				
1868	Tamworth (No. 1)	John Hill and Thomas Watton	Sir Robert Peel, Bt. and Sir Henry Lytton Bulwer, Bt.	Bribery, etc.	Duly elected
	Claims of personal bribery by Peel were groundless, and Peel's land agent Carmichael had not bribed either. Bulwer had allowed his agent Barraclough to hire men to keep the peace on polling day, and Barraclough had hired 130 (many more than necessary), but this was done without approval.				
1868	Taunton (No. 2)	Thomas Meredith Williams and Joseph Mellor	Mr. Serjeant Edward William Cox	Bribery, etc.; Scrutiny of votes	Undue election
	An association had been formed for registering voters. A long time after the registration, the association paid voters 5s. each for registering; no check was made for what anyone had done for the money. The candidates worked closely with the association. When the corrupted votes were struck off, Henry James had a majority and was duly elected.				
1868	Wallingford	Sir Charles Wentworth Dilke, Bt.	Stanley Vickers	Bribery, etc.	Duly elected
	Seven voters living outside the town were invited to the house of Deacon, an agent of Vickers, who gave them food and drink and took them to vote in his carriage, but there was no corrupt intention.				
1868	Warrington	Miles Crozier and others	Peter Rylands	Irregular taking of votes at one polling booth	Duly elected
	There had been confusion at the No. 1 polling booth in the south-east of the town, and for an hour votes were incorrectly recorded or not recorded at all. However it was the legal duty of the voters to make sure their votes were recorded properly.				
1868	Westbury	Abraham Laverton	John Lewis Phipps	Bribery, etc.; Scrutiny of votes	Void election
	Joseph Harrop, a manufacturer in the town, told his employees that they would be dismissed if they voted for Laverton who was his business rival. A recriminatory case against Laverton failed but brought forward serious evidence.				
1868	Westminster	James Beal and others	William Henry Smith	Bribery, etc.	Duly elected
	Smith spent an enormous amount to pay shopkeepers to display his posters, but without an intention to bribe the shopkeepers. Campaign workers were supplied with food and drink, but only ordinary meals.				
1868	Wexford	John Sutton, Thomas Edward Cavanagh, John Wheelock, James Jones, Patrick Brian, and Michael Hughes	Richard Joseph Devereux	Returning Officer wrongly accepted withdrawal of a candidate	Void election
	A show of hands went in favour of Standish Motte, and a poll was demanded. Motte then withdrew, and the Returning Officer subsequently declared Devereux elected; he had no authority to do so. A poll should have been held. Special case.				
1868	Wigan	Daniel Brayshay and William Atkinson	Henry Woods and John Lancaster	Bribery, etc.	Duly elected
	An employee of the political association formed in the town to support Woods and Lancaster had corruptly paid the rates of one voter, but he was not acting as their agent in this action.				
1868	Windsor	Colonel Robert Richardson Gardner	Roger Eykyn	Bribery, etc.	Duly elected
	A voter who had previously promised Eykyn his vote subsequently was given £1 to help him after his two children died, but this was an isolated gift and not a bribe. Eykyn chaired the Odd Fellows Society and had paid for wine at its annual dinner, but it was a non-political occasion.				
1868	Yorkshire (West Riding), Southern (No. 1)	Hon. Francis Dudley Stuart Wortley and George Wilton Chambers	Viscount Milton and Henry Frederick Beaumont	Bribery, etc.	Withdrawn
	A list containing voters alleged to have been bribed was delivered to the respondents too late and was inadmissible. A recriminatory case established that railway fares were paid to allow farmers in Penistone to come to Sheffield to vote, but they would have gone to market on that day in any case.				
1868	Yorkshire (West Riding), Southern (No. 2)	Walter Thomas William Spencer Stanhope	Henry Frederick Beaumont	Bribery, etc.	Withdrawn
	The No. 2 petition was withdrawn, before any evidence was offered, as soon as the No. 1 petition was withdrawn.				
1868	Youghal	John Welling Brasier	Christopher Weguelin	Bribery, etc.	Void election
	From the time he proclaimed himself a candidate until the dissolution of Parliament, Weguelin had offered drink to voters to get their support. The Judge obtained a ruling by the Court of Common Pleas that this was corrupt treating even if halted at dissolution.				
11 Mar 1869	Bewdley	Hon. Augustus Henry Archibald Anson	John Cunliffe Pickersgill Cunliffe	Scrutiny of votes	Undue election
	Anson established that some voters had wrongly been registered and had voted; when their votes were struck off he had a majority of eight. A counter-charge of bribery was withdrawn.				
16 Jun 1869	Nottingham	Lawrence Torr and others	Charles Seely	Bribery, etc.; Rioting	Duly elected
	Evidence of bribery did not establish it was done by the candidate's agents. A single voter was prevented by fear from voting but there was no general riot.				
22 Nov 1869	Waterford City	John Slattery and Daniel Carrigan	Sir Henry Winston Barron, Bt.	Bribery, etc.	Void election
	Sir Henry had appointed his cousin, Marcus Barron, as his agent; Marcus Barron had arranged for extensive bribery to be carried out by Nathaniel Allen.				
31 Dec 1869	County Longford	Thomas Broderick, Michael Lynch, Alexander Birne, and Edward Duggan	Hon. Reginald Greville-Nugent	Failure to give proper notice of election; Bribery, etc.	Void election
	The judge thought the sheriff was entitled to proclaim the election on 27 December after receiving the writ on 24 December. There was "unusual violence" around the election but no proof of intimidation. There was a systematic system of corrupt treating.				
3 Feb 1870	Mallow	Major Lawrence Edward Knox	Henry Munster	Bribery, etc.; Scrutiny of votes	Void election
	22 out of the 47 publicans in the borough were given orders to distribute free food and drink, and all voted for Munster despite some having previously opposed him. Knox was unable to strike off enough votes to prove himself the winner.				
25 Feb 1870	Waterford City	Thomas Condon and Michael O'Shea	Ralph Bernal Osborne	Bribery, etc.	Duly elected
	Claims of undue influence by landlords, employers and spiritual intimidation were abandoned at trial. Claims of corrupt offers were not believed.				
28 Feb 1870	County Tipperary	Patrick Mackay and Thomas Patrick O'Connor	Denis Caulfield Heron	Bribery, etc.; interruption of telegrams	Duly elected
	All charges but those relating to bribery and undue influence were abandoned at trial. There was insufficient evidence of bribery and the Roman Catholic clergy were exercising legitimate influence.				
29 Mar 1870	Bristol	James Brett, Frederick Meers, Henry Matthews, and George Palmer	Elisha Smith Robinson	Bribery, etc.	Void election
	Prior to the election, a test ballot had taken place between three candidates of Robinson's party to determine which of them should be nominated. It was proved that Robinson organised corrupt treating at this election. A special case determined that treating at the test ballot would void the subsequent election.				
13 Jul 1870	Norwich	Gardener Christopher Stevens	Jacob Henry Tillett	Bribery, etc.; employment of corrupt agent; candidate previously guilty of bribery	Void election
	Tillett had run in the 1868 election with Sir William Russell, who employed Orlando Dennis Ray as agent; Ray had been reported guilty of bribery.				
19 Jul 1870	Brecon (No. 1)	Overton and Mainwaring	James Price William Gwynne Holford	Bribery, etc.	Duly elected
	The petitioners attempted to withdraw the petition before trial but were not in time. No evidence was offered.				
19 Jul 1870	Brecon (No. 2)	Richard Watkins and J. Watkins	James Price William Gwynne Holford	Bribery, etc.	Duly elected
	After the previous petition had been dismissed, Holford's mother (with his knowledge) organised a party to celebrate his election win. The attendees included some who had voted against him and the party had not been thought of until after the election.				
21 Sep 1870	Shrewsbury	Buttress, Cock, Davies and Whitwell	Douglas Straight	Bribery, etc.	Duly elected
	The pub owned by a Mr Townsend was used by Straight for the election, and he gave suppers to supporters of Straight, but it was not directed at encouraging voting.				
1 Apr 1872	Galway County	Hon. William De La Poer Trench	John Philip Nolan	Treating; undue influence; candidate disqualified as previously guilty of corrupt practices	Undue election
	The Roman Catholic Archbishop of Tuam (John MacHale), Bishop of Clonfert (Patrick Duggan)), and Bishop of Galway (John McEvilly) and 29 parish priests of the county were held to have used all influence to overthrow all free will. A special case decided that notices put up by Trench alerting voters to Nolan's previous involvement in treating were sufficient to inform voters that he was disqualified. Catholic nationalists regarded judge William Keogh's ruling as a betrayal.				
8 May 1873	Gloucester	Sir William Vernon Guise, Bt., William Philip Price, William Charles Lucy, Henry Allen, and John Pleydell Wilton	William Killigrew Wait	Bribery, etc.; personation	Duly elected
	Claims of bribery and treating were abandoned. Two men of the same name were registered in one street, only one of them qualified; the right one had voted. The under-age son of a voter had been persuaded to vote in his father's name but the canvasser was unaware he was not the right man.				
14 Oct 1873	Taunton	John Marshall and Walter Chorley Brannan	Henry James	Bribery, etc.	Duly elected
	Bribery by a man named Rollings was shown, but it could not be established that Rollings was an agent of James.				
1874	Athlone	Edward Sheil	John James Ennis and Walter Nugent (returning officer)	Returning officer wrongly rejected votes	Undue election
	The original result had given both candidates 140 votes. 21 clear votes for Sheil and 9 for Ennis placed the cross in the wrong place on the ballot paper. The court held that they should have been counted and not rejected, giving Sheil a majority. Special case. No order as to costs.				
1874	Barnstaple	John Fleming and John Holt	Thomas Cave and Samuel Danks Waddy	Bribery, etc.	Duly elected
	The Judges did not believe witnesses who accused the candidates of bribery. Evidence of intimidation by landlords was contradicted.				
1874	Bolton	James Ormrod, William Hargreaves, Thomas Lever Rushton, William Walter Cannon, Nathaniel Greenhalgh, Charles Henry Houldon, William Hesketh	John Kynaston Cross	Bribery, etc.; unlawful communication of names of voters	Duly elected
	It was illegal for personation agents in polling stations to inform the candidate who had voted, but it did not upset the election. Giving railway passes to allow people to come in and vote was not bribery.				
1874	Boston	John Wingfield Malcolm	William James Ingram and Thomas Parry	Bribery, etc.; Scrutiny of votes	Undue election
	877 voters received gifts of coal from agents of Parry with intent to influence their votes; several voters at the Bull Inn were treated by Henry Cabourn Simonds. When votes of those who received coal were struck off, Malcolm had a majority. A special case established this approach to deciding the case was correct.				
1874	Drogheda	Morton and others	Dr. William Hagarty O'Leary and Mr Daly (returning officer)	Bribery, etc.; irregular procedure for voting and maintaining secrecy	Duly elected
	Charges of corrupt practices were withdrawn. The poll opening was delayed by 45 minutes but no voter was prevented from voting. A special case found that, despite the voters' marked papers being visible to others within the polling station, no unauthorised person saw them.				
1874	Dudley	Benjamin Hingley, Edward Bowen, Josiah Robinson, and Thomas Foxall	Henry Brinsley Sheridan	Rioting	Void election
	Void at common law because of rioting by both sides; the only reason there was more violence from Sheridan's side was that he had more riotous supporters.				
1874	Durham City	James and another	John Henderson and Thomas Charles Thompson	Bribery, etc.	Void election
	Several voters had been bribed by John Heaton, John Newton and Charles Dawson who were agents of Henderson and Thompson; Heaton, Newton and Thomas Marshall were also guilty of corrupt treating. The candidates were unaware.				
1874	Durham, Northern	Burdon and others	Isaac Lowthian Bell and Charles Mark Palmer	Bribery, etc.; riot and intimidation	Void election
	The charges of corruption by the agent were rebutted, but there was intimidation in many towns: it took the form of shopkeepers being told they would lose custom if they did not vote in line with their customers, opposition committee rooms being wrecked and houses attacked.				
1874	Hackney	William John Gill	Sir Charles Reed, John Holms, and Henry Child	Failure to hold a poll at some polling places	Void election
	The returning officer had designated 19 polling places. In several of them ballot boxes and ballot papers were not available and no poll was taken; others opened late. At least 4,838 electors were unable to vote out of an electorate of 40,870.				
1874	Haverfordwest	Thomas Whicher Davies	Lord Kensington and William Lewis Harding	Refusal to accept nomination	Void election
	The returning officer, Harding, refused to accept Davies as a candidate unless he gave a £40 deposit against the costs of a contested election (which at this point fell on candidates). Davies declined and was not accepted as a candidate, so Kensington was returned unopposed. The returning officer had no power to insist on a deposit. Special case.				
1874	Kidderminster	James Youngjohns and Charles Thomas	Albert Grant	Bribery, etc.	Void election
	Grant had been invited to contest the seat at the last minute. On the eve of poll he gave a speech promising "an entertainment" if he won, and after winning he made the same promise. A grand fête costing £1,480 was later held. This constituted corrupt treating.				
1874	Launceston	Herbert Charles Drinkwater	James Henry Deakin (sen.)	Bribery, etc.; candidate disqualified through corrupt practice; Scrutiny of votes	Void election
	Deakin, a landowner, had allowed his tenants to kill rabbits on his estate, and sell them; this was a form of bribery. Drinkwater had published a notice declaring his actions corrupt and asserting that Deakin was thereby disqualified. The judges agreed it was corrupt. A special case determined that the notice did not automatically nullify votes for Deakin.				
1874	County Mayo	Sir George Clendining O'Donel	George Ekins Browne, Thomas Tighe, and Joseph Pratt	Refusal to accept nomination	Void election
	The returning officer, Pratt, refused to accept O'Donel as a candidate despite his otherwise valid nomination, because he had not appointed an election agent. The returning officer had no right to do so and ought to have held a poll. Special case.				
1874	Petersfield	Henry John Dayrell Stowe	Hon. Sydney Hylton Jolliffe	Bribery, etc.; voting by ineligible people; Scrutiny of votes	Duly elected
	A house was let to a voter years before on the promise of a vote in return; reminding him of the promise without a threat was not undue influence and the letting was too long ago to constitute bribery. A recriminatory case was abandoned. On a special case, Insufficient ineligible voters were found to upset Jolliffe's majority.				
1874	Poole (No. 1)	Charles Hurdle and Henry Stark	Charles Waring	Bribery, etc.	Void election
	The agent received bills for drink and refreshment supplied during the election, which were paid. Beer had been ordered after the election by Waring's agents and given away free. Because neither was a spontaneous act, this was corrupt treating.				
1874	Poole (No. 2)	Hiram Young and John Rennison	Charles Waring	Bribery, etc.; payments after the election	Void election
	Considered alongside No. 1 petition.				
1874	Renfrewshire	Charles Edward Irvin and James Macgregor	Colonel William Mure	Recount	Duly elected
	The recount increased Mure's majority from 88 to 91. 22 irregularly marked ballots were found, with clear intentions of 8 to vote for Mure and 14 for the runner-up Colonel Campbell. They made no difference to the result.				
1874	Stroud	Baynes and others	Sebastian Stewart Dickinson and Walter John Stanton	Bribery, etc.	Void election
	An agent of the respondents, Smith, openly organised treating and entertainments as part of the campaign, probably in ignorance of the law. When this was proved the two MPs abandoned their defence save to establish that they had neither authorised it nor known about it.				
1874	Wakefield	William Hartley Lee and Isaac Briggs	Edward Green	Bribery, etc.	Void election
	Green was vice-president of a society, many of whose members were his political supporters. Others who attended its meetings were bribed there by his supporters.				
1874	Wigtown Burghs	Andrew Haswell and Robert Jamieson	Mark John Stewart	Returning officer wrongly counted irregular votes	Undue election
	Some ballot papers were discounted, others held good. A special case was referred to the Court of Session on 19 irregularly marked ballot papers. At the end it was found that Stewart was one vote behind Rt Hon George Young; Young had since been made a judge so the seat was vacant, necessitating a by-election				
1874	Windsor	Herbert and another	Robert Richardson-Gardner	Bribery, etc.	Duly elected
	Richardson-Gardner had evicted tenants who voted against him in the 1868 election, but there was no proof this action influenced voters in 1874. Because it was reprehensible behaviour, no order as to costs.				
20 Mar 1874	Galway Borough	Pierce Joyce, jun.	Francis Hugh O'Donnell	Bribery, etc.; employment of corrupt agent	Void election
	A system of intimidation was organised by O'Donnell and mob violence used to intimidate voters. O'Donnell was assisted by some of the Catholic priests reported guilty of undue influence in the County Galway petition in 1872.				
18 May 1874	Stroud	Samuel Marling and others	John Edward Dorington	Bribery, etc.	Void election
	Dorington had been an unsuccessful candidate in the general election and his agents had sent large sums to voters living outside the town as travelling expenses, which were much more than a railway ticket would cost.				
18 May 1874	Stroud	Baynes and others	Alfred John Stanton	Bribery, etc.	Duly elected
	Mills in the town had closed for polling day but workmen were paid for a day's work. This was a kindness and not bribery.				
15 Jun 1874	Wigtown Burghs	Augustus Smith	Mark John Stewart	Scrutiny of votes	Duly elected
	The scrutiny reduced Stewart's majority from 8 votes to 2.				
22 Jun 1874	Durham, Northern	Thomas Graholm and Samuel Storey	Sir George Elliot, Bt.	Bribery, etc.	Duly elected
	After "trifling" evidence of bribery, the petitioners applied to withdraw the petition. The Judge insisted on giving a full judgment.				
22 Jun 1874	Durham, Northern	Edward Pickering and William Williams	Charles Mark Palmer	Bribery, etc.	Withdrawn
	As soon as the case was opened the petitioners applied to withdraw it; the Judge allowed them.				
27 Jul 1874	Stroud	George Holloway	Henry Robert Brand	Bribery, etc., at this and previous elections	Void election
	At least 13 bribed voters were found (two more were offered bribes) and five bribers were named. Brand's agent, on realising what he would have to disclose in court, had absconded. There was a £1,200 fund for 'decorations' which was partly used for bribery.				
30 Dec 1874	St Ives	Sir Francis Lycett	Charles Tyringham Praed	Bribery, etc.	Void election
	After it was established that several pubs in St Ives and surrounding areas were opened to supply free drink in support of Praed, Praed's counsel conceded that the election must be void.				
6 Mar 1875	Norwich	Francis Ames	Jacob Henry Tillett	Bribery, etc.; employment of corrupt agents	Void election No by-election before 1880 general election.
	After seven witnesses were called, counsel for Tillett declared that he believed that they and many other voters were bribed by being unjustifiably employed on the election. Tillett was unaware.				
11 Mar 1875	County Tipperary (No. 1)	Matthew Villiers Sankey Morton	John Mitchel (replaced after his death by Michael John Cahalan and Edward Galway)	Candidate disqualified due to conviction for treason felony	Undue election
	Before the petition was heard, Mitchel died. Cahalan failed in an application to the Court of Common Pleas to set the petition aside. Galway was struck out as a respondent. Mitchel had been convicted of treason felony in 1848. As voters knew of his history, their votes for him were thrown away and the runner-up, Moore, was duly elected.				
11 Mar 1875	County Tipperary (No. 2)	Captain Stephen Moore	James Scully (High Sheriff) and Michael John Cahalan	Candidate disqualified as a naturalised alien and through treason felony	Undue election
	Mitchel had escaped transportation in 1853 and been naturalised as a citizen of the United States of America at San Francisco, renouncing his allegiance to Britain. Considered alongside No. 1 petition				
18 Oct 1875	Armagh City	Dr James Ledlie Riggs, George Scott Riddell, and James Gardner	Captain George de la Poer Beresford	Bribery, etc.	Duly elected
	96 cases of bribery were alleged with 125 witnesses, but the Judge found that those for the defence always outweighed those for the petitioners.				
17 Dec 1875	Horsham	John Aldridge	Robert Henry Hurst	Bribery, etc.	Void election
	Letters sent to voters living outside the town offered to pay their travelling expenses to vote, provided they promised their vote to Hurst. Travelling expenses were money and this was therefore bribery.				
1880	Athlone	Edward Sheil	Sir John Ennis, 2nd Baronet	Personation	Duly elected
	Shiel had a majority of one and Ennis claimed two voters had voted instead of their identically named deceased fathers. The Judge found that the sons were the people on the register. Other personation cases were not proved.				
1880	Bewdley	William Francis Spencer and John Blundell	Charles Harrison	Bribery, etc.	Void election
	An association formed to promote Harrison worked together with his election agent. Members of the association were involved in several acts of bribery including letting voters off debts if they promised their votes.				
1880	Boston (No. 1)	Sydney Charles Buxton	Thomas Garfit	Bribery, etc.	Void election No by-election. Constituency reduced to one member from 1885.
	After several witnesses had given unchallenged evidence of bribery, counsel for Garfit admitted that he could not defend the case.				
1880	Boston (No. 2)	Charles Thomas Tunnard, William Barton, John Ashlin Thomas, Edward Clarke Porter, Charles Dobson, John William Rowland, William Charlton, John Thompson, William Smart, George Colley Bland, and Samuel Sherwin	William James Ingram	Bribery, etc.	Void election No by-election. Constituency reduced to one member from 1885.
	Ingram's agent, believing his opponents would engage in bribery, employed 300–400 voters on polling day in various nominal roles. This was a disguised form of bribery.				
1880	Buteshire	Archibald McKay, Richard Ferguson, John Duncan, Alexander Brown, and Alexander McLean	Thomas Russell	Bribery, etc.; Candidate disqualified due to Government contract	Void election
	Russell accepted that he was indeed disqualified under the House of Commons Disqualification Act 1782 (22 Geo. 3. c. 45); the bribery allegations were abandoned and no trial was held.				
1880	Canterbury	Henry Munro-Butler-Johnstone	Hon. Alfred Erskine Gathorne-Hardy and Col. Robert Peter Laurie	Bribery, etc.	Void election No by-election before 1885 general election.
	After several witnesses had given evidence of direct bribery by people acting for Hardy and Laurie, counsel for the respondents told the court that he had to advise his clients they did not have an answer to the charges. The candidates were unaware.				
1880	Carrickfergus	Marriott Robert Dalway	Thomas Greer	Bribery, etc.; personation; scrutiny of votes	Duly elected
	The scrutiny was abandoned. Greer's charitable gifts were genuinely charitable and not an indirect attempt at corrupting voters. Providing cars to help voters was illegal but was not done corruptly. No proof of personation was found.				
1880	Cheltenham	Pakenham and others	Baron Charles Conrad Adolphus du Bois de Ferrieres	Bribery, etc.; disqualified as an alien	Duly elected
	Coal and bread tickets were distributed by a man called Solomon who was possibly an agent of de Ferrieres, but were bought by a subscription fund. De Ferrieres had been naturalised by a private act of Parliament, Baron de Ferrieres' Naturalization Act 1867 (30 & 31 Vict. c. 12 Pr.), which made him eligible to take a seat in Parliament.				
1880	Chester	Thomas Heywood, William Dodd, William Jones and William Davies	Rt Hon John George Dodson and Hon. Beilby Lawley	Bribery, etc.	Void election No by-election before 1885 general election. Dodson had already resigned and been returned unopposed in a ministerial by-election by the time the petition was tried; he was unseated and stood instead in Scarborough
	When the candidates began their campaign, they found a political association was very well organised in the city, and they could not run their campaign without dealing with it. More than 30 witnesses established that the association engaged in bribery.				
1880	Down	Blakely McCartney	Viscount Castlereagh	Undue influence; scrutiny of votes	Duly elected
	Carriages had been hired to take voters to the poll, which was illegal, but the votes of the cabmen were not nullified in consequence. No order as to costs.				
1880	Dungannon	Robert Newton and Armytage Lennox Nicholson	Thomas Alexander Dickson	Bribery, etc.	Void election
	Dickson's agent had offered an ex-employee of his £10 not to vote for his opponent. Two other cases of alleged bribery were not proved.				
1880	Evesham	Edward Charles Rudge and Joseph Masters	Daniel Rowlinson Ratcliff	Bribery, etc.	Void election
	Ratcliffe had made many charitable gifts nationwide, including at Evesham. His agent, Ballinger, had made sure that anything given in Evesham was conditional on the recipient promising their vote.				
1880	Gloucester	Edmund Digby Worsley, James Franklin, and George Twyford	Thomas Robinson and Charles James Monk	Bribery, etc.	Void election (Robinson only); No by-election before 1885 general election.
	Robinson gave notice before the trial that he would not defend the petition. The petitioners presented evidence of direct bribery by Robinson's agent but offered no evidence against Monk. The Judges made a special report that the withdrawal of the petition against Monk appeared to be a corrupt agreement to cover up his involvement in bribery.				
1880	Gravesend	Sir Francis Truscott	Thomas Bevan	Bribery, etc.	Void election
	Bevan was an employer of 1,000 in the town, of which 180 were voters and many others were relations of voters. On election day the employees clocked in as usual, were given rosettes in Bevan's colours, and all voted in a group, then had a paid holiday. This constituted bribery.				
1880	Harwich	Col. George Tomline	Sir Henry Whatley Tyler	Bribery, etc.	Duly elected
	Tyler had given firm instructions that his canvass was to be run by Francis Hales; he had no connection to an unofficial canvass and was not responsible for their corrupt acts. A recriminatory case established that Tomline's agents had bribed voters.				
1880	Knaresborough	Basil Thomas Woodd and Thomas Slingsby	Sir Henry Meysey Meysey-Thompson, Bt.	Bribery, etc.	Void election
	After evidence of extensive treating had been given, counsel for Meysey-Thompson conceded that he could not deny that an admitted agent was responsible.				
1880	Lichfield	Sir John Swinburne, Bt.	Colonel Richard Dyott	Bribery, etc.	Void election
	Agents of Dyott's, stationed in one polling station on election day, continued to solicit votes and kept such a close eye on voters as to intimidate them.				
1880	Louth County	George Harley Kirk	Philip Callan	Bribery, etc.	Duly elected
	Trivial amounts of food and drink were given as gifts during the election; they could not have influenced votes. Others accused of corrupt practices were clearly not agents of Callan.				
1880	Macclesfield	Isaac Day, Charles Shaw, James Gayes, and Edward Fairhurst	William Coare Brocklehurst and David Chadwick	Bribery, etc.	Void election No by-election before 1885 general election.
	An extensive system of bribery and treating by agent was proved.				
1880	Plymouth	Isaac Latimer and Francis Barratt	Sir Edward Bates, Bt.	Bribery, etc.	Void election
	Bates had sent an agent, Stibbs, to Penzance to find Plymouth voters and bring them back; one fisherman had insisted on having his travelling expenses and paying for a substitute to do his fishing during his absence, which was paid. This constituted bribery.				
1880	Salisbury	Rigden and others	John Passmore Edwards and William Henry Grenfell	Bribery, etc.	Duly elected
	Witnesses accusing the two MPs of personal bribery were unconvincing and that part of the case was withdrawn. A well-known local resident who helped introduce Edwards and Grenfell to local people had engaged in bribery but was not their agent.				
1880	Tewkesbury	Collins and others	William Edwin Price	Bribery, etc.	Void election
	Ebenezer Lugg was established as having given money to, and forgiven the debts of, a shoemaker and elector called Samuel Jones; he also gave a new pair of boots to another voter. The court was satisfied that Lugg was an agent of Price.				
1880	Thirsk	Samuel Bradley Wilcock, Robert Skilbeck, Thomas Humphrey, and David Meek	Colonel Hon. Lewis Payn Dawnay	Bribery, etc.	Duly elected
	The petitioners brought evidence of corrupt dealings by a man called Wright but the judge found all the allegations had failed; it seemed that Wright had no connection to Dawnay.				
1880	Wallingford	Edward Wells	Walter Wren	Bribery, etc.	Void election
	Many acts of bribery by a single person were uncovered. Wren's counsel accepted that he was clearly an agent and that Wren was responsible in law for his actions.				
1880	Westbury	Abraham Laverton	Charles Nicholas Paul Phipps	Bribery, etc.	Duly elected
	Several acts of bribery were proved to have been committed by George and William Cornish. George Cornish had sought employment by one candidate, and when refused, supported his opponent; William was his brother. However each had acted independently of Phipps.				
1880	Worcester	George Farmsworth, Frederick Wadeley, Walter Baylis, Henry Davis and James Edmonds	Thomas Rowley Hill and Æneas John McIntyre	Bribery, etc.; failure to open and close poll on time	Duly elected
	Evidence of bribery was unbelievable; witnesses failed to give evidence in court along the lines they had given to the petitioners. One polling station was rushed by a large group during the afternoon, which caused the presiding officer to close up briefly to restore order; this was justified.				
1880	Worcestershire, Western	Fildes and Darling	Sir Edmund Lechmere, Bt. and Frederick Winn Knight	Treating	Duly elected
	The claims of treating were minor in the first place. Claims that a free round of beer were bought for people at a public meeting for Lechmere and Knight were disproved on the evidence.				
10 May 1880	Oxford	Thomas H. Green, Owen Grimbly, William Parish, George Rolleston, Henry S. Underhill, and George Young	Alexander William Hall	Bribery, etc.	Void election No by-election. Constituency reduced to one member from 1885.
	Hall's campaign employed 744 'messengers' on election day, of whom 600 were voters. Their work was purely nominal and the employment was a cover for a bribe.				
19 May 1880	Sandwich	Sir Julian Goldsmid, Bt.	Charles Henry Crompton-Roberts	Bribery, etc.	Void election No by-election. Constituency abolished 1885.
	Crompton-Roberts engaged a solicitor, Hughes, to run the election. Hughes hired a 'committee room' in each of 88 pubs in the constituency, for £5 each which was much more than the market rent; most of the rooms were never used. The Judges decided this was a hidden form of bribery.				
20 May 1880	Wigtown Burghs	Alexander Boyd and James O'Kane	Mark John Stewart	Bribery, etc.	Void election
	After witnesses had given evidence of bribery, counsel for Stewart declared that he could not maintain his defence of the petition. The Judges accepted that Stewart had no personal involvement.				
1 Jul 1880	Wallingford	Robert William Hanbury	Pandeli Ralli	Bribery, etc.	Duly elected
	Groups of agricultural workers were bribed to come to vote by a man named Green, but Green's connection to Ralli could not be substantiated.				
9 Jul 1880	Evesham	Frederick Dixon Dyke Hartland	Augustus Frederick Lehmann	Bribery, etc.; scrutiny of votes	Undue election
	Extensive treating by agents of Lehmann was established; the Judges noted that Lehmann himself was never called as a witness. A recriminatory case against Hartland failed to prove corrupt practices on the part of his campaign. On a scrutiny, Lehmann's two vote majority was converted into a one-vote majority for Hartland.				
21 Jul 1880	Berwick-upon-Tweed	John McLaren	David Milne Home	Returning officer wrongly refused and rejected votes; scrutiny of votes	Duly elected
	Some irregularly marked votes which had been rejected were held good. The scrutiny resulted in Home's majority increasing from two to three.				
20 Jan 1881	Wigan	James Spencer and Edward Prestt	Francis Sharp Powell	Bribery, etc.	Void election
	Powell's agent worked closely with Thomas Scott, who was secretary of a local political Association. Scott was responsible for several acts of direct bribery. Food and drink provided on election day was more effective treating because the local miners were on strike and many families were starving.				
21 Nov 1882	Salisbury	Moore and others	Coleridge Kennard	Bribery, etc.	Duly elected
	While Kennard employed 214 people on election day (including 78 voters), each of them could account for the fact that they were employed for genuine duties, and so the jobs were not a cover for bribery.				
1885	Aylesbury	Frederick Charsley	Baron Ferdinand de Rothschild	Bribery, etc.	Duly elected
	158 men employed in tree planting on an estate belonging to a cousin of Rothschild were allowed half a day's paid leave to go to vote, but the foreman was not an agent and was only allowing them reasonable time. Rothschild gave an annual school treat to up to 10,000 people in the area which was held shortly before the election, but it was not a political occasion.				
1885	Barrow-in-Furness	Henry William Schneider	David Duncan	Bribery, etc.	Void election
	It was not illegal for Duncan to pay people to distribute leaflets, but his provision of refreshments to 441 campaign workers on polling day constituted a form of payment which was now illegal. A recriminatory case was withdrawn.				
1885	Ipswich	Packard and others	Henry Wyndham West and Jesse Collings	Bribery, etc.	Void election
	West and Collings' agent hired a number of 'roughs' to keep order at their public meetings shortly before the polling day. Doing so was not illegal but the expenditure was illegal under s. 17 of the 1883 Act.				
1885	Kennington	John Crossman, George Garlick, John Charles Jowett, and John Sandes	Robert Gent-Davis	Illegal payments; illegal employment	Duly elected
	Gent-Davis had paid for an electoral registration drive, and during the election had published a local newspaper to promote his views. While they were done to improve his chances, they did not count as election expenses.				
1885	Norwich	Henry Birkbeck and others	Harry Bullard	Bribery, etc.; election expenses not paid through agent	Void election
	Costs of meetings held to invite Bullard to contest the election were not election expenses. A leaflet urging voters to persuade their friends to support Bullard did not make all the recipients his agent. Charges of bribery were not made out but several public houses engaged in treating. Posters were distributed in the city by a man called Corrick who was not the agent, and they cost £19 18s; this was illegal expenditure.				
1885	St Andrews Burghs	Sir Robert Anstruther, Bt.	Stephen Williamson	Recount with scrutiny	Undue election
	The original result had been a tie. A voter named John Watson was found to have been personated; the personated vote went to Williamson while Watson's real vote went to Anstruther. Another voter had been registered twice and had cast both votes for Anstruther. Other objections to votes failed. As a result, Anstruther had a majority of one.				
1885	Stepney	Frederick Wootton Isaacson	John Charles Durant	Votes cast by voters who were corrupt, voting twice, personated, disqualified; Erroneous counting; Scrutiny of votes	Duly elected
	A voter employed by Durant before his selection was held to be disqualified from voting; one whose children were employed was also disqualified. Compensating a voter for the loss of his hat at a public meeting was not illegal expenditure. One personated vote was struck and a tendered vote accepted. The judges disagreed in the recriminatory case on whether Isaacson was entitled to employ people to hand out handbills outside polling stations. The Queen's Bench Division of the High Court was asked to rule on whether people born in Hanover before 1837 were British subjects. At the conclusion of the scrutiny and recount, Durant had a majority of 10 votes.				
1885	Thornbury	Benjamin St John Ackers	Edward Stafford Howard	Bribery, etc.; Rioting and intimidation; counting ballot papers which were void	Duly elected
	Organised bands came into the constituency and attacked Ackers' committee rooms as well as homes, but most electors in the affected areas voted anyway. A slight overpayment for hiring a committee room was not bribery. On a point of law reserved to the Queen's Bench Division of the High Court, it was decided that ballots with the official mark only on the back and not the front were valid.				
1886	Belfast, West	James Horner Haslett	Thomas Sexton	Bribery, etc.; Disqualified from election; Personation	Duly elected
	Sexton had been returned unopposed for South Sligo on 5 July but nominations in Belfast had closed on 2 July. Witnesses failed to give any evidence of bribery. 13 cases of personation were proved in respect of people who had voted for Sexton, but they did not affect the result.				
1886	Buckrose	Christopher Sykes	William Alexander McArthur	Votes cast by voters who were corrupt, personated, disqualified; Erroneous counting; Scrutiny of votes	Undue election
	Certain votes were struck off and others were held good. It was illegal to use a schoolmasters' home, provided it was part of the premises of a state school, as a committee room; as this was illegal, the votes of those in charge were struck off. A tendered ballot put in the ballot box was bad even though the voter had been personated. Payments made by a local political association which were not returned as election expenses were illegal and the secretary of the association's vote was struck. At the end of scrutiny a majority of 1 for McArthur had become 11 for Sykes.				
1886	Londonderry City	Justin McCarthy	Charles Edward Lewis	Bribery, etc.; Voting by minors; Erroneous counting	Undue election
	Five non-resident freemen had voted; they were entitled to. One voter, Robert Neely, was proved to have been bribed by an agent of Lewis. As a result of the scrutiny, Lewis' majority of 3 was reversed and McCarthy had a majority of lawful votes.				
1892	Clare, Eastern	Joseph Richard Cox	William Hoey Kearney Redmond	Bribery, etc.; Intimidation; Returning Officer irregularities	Duly elected
	It was not illegal for the Young Ireland Society to print 3,000 cards reading "Men of Clare, remember Parnell; vote for Redmond". The Returning Officer had held the poll too soon after nomination but it was an honest mistake and Cox had not objected at the time. Two presiding officers who had closed the poll for lunch did not invalidate the election. 195 votes which were not detached from the counterfoils were bad; they did not affect Redmond's majority.				
1892	Finsbury, Central	Frederick Thomas Penton	Dadabhai Naoroji	Votes cast by voters who were disqualified, personated, employed by Naoroji, corrupt, voting twice	Withdrawn
	Some votes were from aliens who had not been naturalised, and were struck. Others were struck because the voter was registered in two divisions of Finsbury. Personated votes was struck. People contracted to post bills or clean rooms by Naoroji were entitled to vote. At the end of the scrutiny Naoroji's majority increased from 3 to 5, and the Judge allowed the petition to be withdrawn.				
1892	Greenock	Sir Thomas Sutherland	John Bruce	Recount	Undue election
	As a result of the recount, a majority of 44 for Bruce was reversed to a majority of 55 for Sutherland.				
1892	Hexham	William Hudspeth and John Knox Lyal	Nathaniel George Clayton	Bribery, etc.	Void election
	Clayton had given his agent, Isaac Baty, £326 for the local political association, including £35 for holding a picnic at Clayton's home. This constituted illegal treating.				
1892	Manchester, East	Joseph Edward Crawfurd Munro	Rt Hon Arthur James Balfour	Bribery, etc.; illegal hiring	Duly elected
	Claims of illegal hiring were malformed in the wording of the petition and had to be abandoned. There never was any evidence that workmen at Chester's Brewery had been given a paid holiday; Munro abandoned this part of the case. Claims by a man called Green that he agreed to participate in bribery were incredible. The evidence did not support charges of treating.				
1892	North Meath	Pierce Charles de Lacy O'Mahony	Michael Davitt	Intimidation; undue influence	Void election
	The same factors were at work in North Meath as in South Meath, which was tried first. A pastoral letter written by Thomas Nulty, the Roman Catholic Bishop of Meath, was read from the altar in all churches in the diocese attacking Charles Stewart Parnell, and stating with no-one could remain a Catholic and support him. After the South Meath judgment the petition was not defended.				
1892	South Meath	James Joseph Dalton	Patrick Fulham	Bribery, etc.; Intimidation; undue influence	Void election
	Charges of bribery and treating could not be proved. A pastoral letter written by Thomas Nulty, the Roman Catholic Bishop of Meath, was read from the altar in all churches in the diocese attacking Charles Stewart Parnell, and stating with no-one could remain a Catholic and support him. This constituted undue influence.				
1892	Montgomery Boroughs	T. George, J. Pickup and J. Andrew	Sir Pryce Pryce-Jones	Bribery, etc.	Duly elected
	A voter named Withers claimed to have been bribed by Pryce-Jones but he was not a reliable witness. Pryce-Jones' campaign was unlikely to have appointed Thomas Jones a member of their committee and instructed him to go about bribing voters, and he did not bribe. Evidence of treating did not establish a link to Pryce-Jones.				
1892	Rochester	Alfred Barry and Charles John Saxby Varrall	Horatio David Davies	Bribery, etc.	Void election
	Payments by Davies to a constituency association were supposed to cover registration expenses, but no accounts were produced to prove it. The association held a conversazione with food and drink provided at nominal price to the attendees; the costs were not returned as election expenses.				
1892	Stepney	William Rushmere and William Charles Steadman	Frederick Wootton Isaacson	Bribery, etc.	Duly elected
	Some voters who were employed for pay and disqualified from voting did vote, but they were unaware; the agent had not told them, but had not procured their votes either. Banners stretched across streets endorsing Isaacson, paid for by Isaacson's agent, were illegal expenditure, but the agent's actions were inadvertent and so he was given relief.				
1892	Walsall	Henry Hately, Thomas Moss and James Mason	Frank James	Bribery, etc.	Void election
	2,000 hat cards ordered by the local Licensed Victuallers' Association were paid for by James's agent out of the election account. This was illegal expenditure.				
1892	Worcester	William Glaszard and Edwin Turner	Hon. George Allsopp	Bribery, etc.	Duly elected
	The petitioners identified 147 cases of bribery by money, and 93 by drink, but the evidence brought forward was minimal.				
13 Oct 1892	Cirencester	Harry Lawson Webster Lawson	Colonel Thomas Chester-Master	Recount with scrutiny	Void election
	The original result had been a majority of 2 for Chester-Master. One voter had erroneously been recorded as voting; his tendered vote was added. Votes not marked with the official mark on the back were bad, but if the ink showed through from the front, they were good. Other votes were struck and others held good. At the end, the candidates were exactly equal.				
13 Feb 1893	Pontefract	John Shaw	Harold James Reckitt	Bribery, etc.	Void election
	An agent of Reckitt's had corruptly paid travelling expenses of one voter, and had given him an additional payment after he had voted. A corrupt offer of payment had been made to another voter.				
11 Aug 1893	Halifax	Alfred Arnold	William Rawson Shaw	Recount	Duly elected
	The recount resulted in Shaw obtaining the same 368 vote majority as in the original count.				
1895	Elginshire and Nairnshire	James Hood and Alexander Gillanders	Hon. John Edward Gordon	Bribery, etc.	Duly elected
	Gordon's election expenses began only when he was selected, not when he began seeking selection. A paid polling agent lawfully appointed, who also canvassed on a voluntary basis, was not illegally employed. After these points the petitioners offered no more evidence.				
1895	Haggerston	William Randal Cremer	John Lowles	Bribery, etc.; excessive election expenses; Recount	Duly elected
	Some election expenses had not been returned, but would not have taken Lowles over the legal limit. To mark his birthday Lowles distributed 500 cards entitling recipients to 6d. of food, but his name did not appear on them and the cards were distributed by a political opponent; the Judges disagreed on whether this was corrupt treating. They had to agree to make a finding of corruption. The recount increased Lowles' majority from 31 to 40. A recriminatory case was withdrawn.				
1895	Lancaster	Thomas Bradshaw and Alfred Wilkes Kaye	Colonel William Henry Foster	Bribery, etc.; inducing prohibited people to vote; election literature without imprint	Duly elected
	Smoking concerts had been held by Foster's agent, at which free drinks were distributed; these concerts went on routinely outside election times, so were not corrupt. It was not illegal for a voter to have his tram fare to the poll paid for by a friend. The judges did not believe evidence of direct bribery.				
1895	Lichfield	Sir Charles Wolseley, Bt., Theophilus John Levett, John Alkin and John Shaw	Henry Charles Fulford	Bribery, etc.; Illegal employment; Incomplete return of election expenses	Void election
	Fulford's donation to an association of miners was not bribery. Treating could not be proved. A sub-agent had voted, and as a result had not been paid; his inferred salary was not an election expense. Paid agents had canvassed, which was unlawful. A regular subsidy paid to a supportive newspaper ought to have been returned as an election expense. Some election meetings were not returned as they ought to have been.				
1895	St George	John Williams Benn	Harry Hananel Marks	Bribery, etc.; False statement of fact; Recount with scrutiny	Duly elected
	Marks was president of a philanthropic society to help the poor of the constituency which distributed tickets for free coal, but distribution was not political and it was not corrupt. Marks' subscription of 5gs. to help costermongers fight a ban on placing stalls was legitimate. Free drinks at a smoking concert were paid by the Irish Unionist Alliance and not by Marks. A campaign statement that Benn had "a skeleton in his cupboard" was not made by an agent of Marks. A recriminatory case failed when it accused Benn of false statements of fact failed because the leaflet in question was published before the Corrupt and Illegal Practices Prevention Act 1895 had come into force; the case did establish that Benn's payment for linen banners was illegal. The recount increased Marks' majority from 4 to 11.				
1895	Southampton (No. 2)	Walter Crees Austen and John Rowland	Tankerville Chamberlayne and Sir John Barrington Simeon, Bt.	Bribery, etc.	Void election (Chamberlayne only)
	A member of Chamberlayne and Simeon's committee paid the rail fare for a voter to come from Winchester; this was illegal but a very small amount, and he was given relief. Claims of attempted bribery at public meetings by Chamberlayne were not proved. Chamberlayne had led a procession through the town followed by brewery carts; the procession stopped at many local pubs where followers were given drink. This constituted corrupt treating; Simeon was unconnected with it.				
1895	Sunderland	Samuel Storey	William Theodore Doxford	False statements of fact	Duly elected
	A speech by Doxford saying Storey had accused him of sacking his older workers, and a newspaper claim that Storey had endorsed a socialist programme, were withdrawn at the trial. The Sunderland Herald and Daily Post had republished an editorial as a leaflet, attacking Storey for paying low wages, but the editor of the newspaper was not an agent of Doxford.				
13 Jan 1898	York	Sir Christopher Furness	Lord Charles William de la Poer Beresford	Recount and scrutiny	Withdrawn
	The recount resulted in Beresford's majority of 11 being eliminated and both candidates receiving the same number of votes, with several ballot papers reserved for a court decision. Furness was advised that he would probably get 4, while Beresford would get 11; his counsel therefore applied to withdraw the petition.				
1900	Christchurch	Hon. Thomas Allnutt Brassey	Major Kenneth Robert Balfour	Votes cast by ineligible voters; Recount with scrutiny	Withdrawn
	After the recount increased Balfour's majority from 3 to 11, Brassey was advised that he did not have sufficient evidence to prove enough cases of ineligible voters to overturn the result. He was granted permission to withdraw the petition.				
1900	Cockermouth	John Armstrong, James Hardaker Brooksbank, Benjamin Brown, James Beck, William Cooper, and Barwise Henderson	John Scurrah Randles	Illegal practices by agent	Duly elected
	A room in a pub had been used as a committee room, but it had previously been used in elections and had no connection to the bar. The election address did not have the printers' name, but the photograph of Randles on one side of it had the stamp of the company responsible, so the Judges gave relief. A tea meeting held by Randles' party association was organised independently of his campaign and did not form part of it. A speech critical of Randles' opponent Sir Wilfrid Lawson which was also published as a pamphlet was critical of Lawson's political conduct rather than his personal character, and so could not infringe the law.				
1900	Islington, West	Francis Hastings Medhurst	Thomas Lough and Charles Gasquet, Returning Officer	Polling stations remained open after 8 PM	Duly elected
	When it turned 8 PM (the time the poll should have closed), voters waiting within polling stations were allowed to vote. The Judges decided that voters who had been given a ballot paper before the close of poll ought to be allowed to fill it in and vote, but those waiting for ballot papers should not be supplied with them. Only 14 ballot papers were given out after 8 PM, which meant that Lough's majority of 19 was safe.				
1900	Maidstone	Fiennes Stanley Wykeham Cornwallis	John Barker	Bribery, etc.	Void election
	After several witnesses had given evidence of direct bribery by Barker's agents, Barker's counsel announced that he could not contradict them; Barker himself was unaware of what had happened. There were about 25 proven cases where voters were given either 5s., 7s. 6d., or 10s., to support Barker.				
1900	Monmouth Boroughs	Thomas Embrey and Christopher Sweeting	Dr Frederick Rutherfoord Harris	Payments not made through agent; False return of election expenses; Illegal expenditure; False statement of fact	Void election
	Thomas Icke gave unchallenged evidence he had been engaged as a clerk, but had been paid in the name of his son; counsel for Harris accepted that this voided the election. The editor of the Western Daily Mail had successfully pressed Harris to advertise in the paper; the bill had been paid by Harris's private secretary (not an agent) but when it was realised that it was election spending the money was refunded and then paid by the agent. Harris's statements accusing his opponent Albert Spicer of living off the profits of cheap foreign labour and giving ammunition to the enemies of England were false statements of fact about Spicer's personal character.				
1900	Pembroke Boroughs	Thomas Terrell	General John Wimburn Laurie	Recount and scrutiny	Withdrawn
	The recount increased Laurie's majority from 12 to 17. A separate court judgment shortly before the election had ordered the removal of freeholders of Haverfordwest from the electoral register of this constituency, but the election had taken place using the old register; because it was still current, the 28 freeholders who cast votes were entitled to do so. At that point the petitioners applied to withdraw the petition and Laurie also applied to withdraw a counter-petition alleging corruption; the court allowed both applications.				
1906	Appleby	Hon. Henry William Edmund Petty-Fitzmaurice, Earl of Kerry	Leifchild Stratten Jones	Recount and scrutiny	Withdrawn
	The recount increased Jones's majority from 3 to 8; nine ballot papers were reserved for the opinion of the court. Kerry was advised that he would not secure enough to obtain a majority and successfully applied to withdraw the petition.				
1906	Bodmin	Lt-Col William Henry Vallack Tom and William Stuart Bruton Duff	Hon. Thomas Charles Reginald Agar-Robartes	Bribery, etc.; False return of election expenses	Void election
	Evidence on bribery substantiated only one case which involved a shilling; the petitioners withdrew the charge, and also offered no evidence of illegal payments. Agar-Robartes had held a series of meetings from 1903 onwards to make himself known; the Judges disagreed about whether their costs were election expenses. Agar-Robartes had regularly gone to pubs around the constituency and bought everyone a round of drinks, sometimes with his election agent; this was corrupt treating. A garden party given by Agar-Robartes' parents had 4,000 attendees; Agar-Robartes' election agent used it to campaign for his election, so it too was corrupt treating.				
1906	Great Yarmouth	Martin White	Arthur Fell	Bribery, etc.	Duly elected
	A man named Baker drove voters to the polls in a cart which had been lent to Fell for polling day. He gave each voter between two and five shillings. When one of Fell's campaign workers was told about it, he challenged Baker, who denied doing so; Baker was allowed to continue using the cart. The Judges disagreed on whether Baker was an agent of Fell for the purposes of election law; they needed to agree to avoid the election. An almanac distributed by Fell on Christmas Day was not returnable as an election expense. Meetings and smoking concerts organised by Fell's local association from 1904, at which free drink was distributed, were not election expenses and did not constitute corrupt treating. A party for the retiring MP for the seat openly advertised in local newspapers where some whisky was given was not corrupt treating.				
1906	Maidstone	Sir Francis Evans, Bt.	Charles Stewart Henry Vane-Tempest-Stewart, Viscount Castlereagh	Bribery, etc.; false statement of election expenses; exceeding maximum election expenses	Duly elected
	A witness statement from a campaign worker claiming to have been paid £2 by Castlereagh's agent had been taken under pressure and the witness recanted. An elderly voter who had been brought by car to vote but missed the lift back was given his railway fare back home, but after the polls had closed; this did not constitute bribery. A "mad freak of [a] man" named Tyrer who had seized some of Castlereagh's leaflets and gone out waving them, calling for support for Castlereagh, and throwing money down from a balcony was not authorised by the campaign. Castlereagh was not adopted as a candidate until 27 December 1905 and his spending before then was not election expenses.				
1906	Sheffield, Attercliffe	Arnold Muir Wilson	J. Batty Langley	False statement of fact	Duly elected
	Wilson, a solicitor and Sheffield City Councillor, had pressed the Attorney-General to prosecute fellow councillor Charles Hobson who had accepted a £100 bribe for persuading the council to buy a piece of land; Wilson had been the prosecuting counsel and Hobson had been imprisoned. Langley had issued a leaflet on polling day stating "Who hounded Charles Hobson to prison? NOT BATTY LANGLEY". The statement that Wilson had hounded Hobson was not a false statement of fact in the mind of Langley. Other statements in the leaflet were not about Wilson's personal character.				
1906	Worcester	Henry Devenish Harben and Richard Cadbury	George Henry Williamson	Bribery, etc.	Void election
	After three days of evidence which established extensive bribery of voters, counsel for Williamson accepted that he could not contest the petition. Williamson was personally unaware of the bribery.				
Jan 1910	Denbigh Boroughs	Allen Clement Edwards	Hon. William George Arthur Ormsby-Gore	Recount and scrutiny	Withdrawn
	The recount increased Ormsby-Gore's majority from 8 to 10 votes. As a result, Edwards applied for, and was given, leave to withdraw the petition.				
Jan 1910	Dorset, Eastern	Lt-Col Walker Miller Lambert and Gerald Dennis Bond	Captain Hon. Frederick Edward Guest	Bribery, etc.; false declaration of election expenses	Void election
	The Guest family under Viscount Wimborne was a major local landowner. A workman on the family estates was sacked in what the Judges suspected was a demonstration to other workers of the need for political loyalty. 400 allotment holders, who were being evicted by the estate which wanted building land, were allowed to stay after a campaign by a political supporter of Guest, but this action did not appear to be corrupt. Estate agents were outside polling booths watching voters; this was lawful. The Judge did not believe claims of direct bribery. A large number of cars were used to drive voters to the polls, including by Lady Wimborne; their cost was election expenses. Pamphlets defending the Guest family should have been counted for election expenses, which took the total over the maximum.				
Jan 1910	The Hartlepools	Joseph Forster Wilson and John Roger Butterwick	Sir Christopher Furness	Bribery, etc.	Void election
	Furness's son Marmaduke hired a special train to convey horses, carriages and grooms to the borough where they were used to transport voters to the polls; this expenditure was not illegal. Clerks working for Furness's firm were allowed to help on election day, a Saturday, but the work was voluntary and therefore their salary was not election expenses. £5 of postage stamps was not returned as election expenses, which took the amount over the maximum, but the Judges gave relief. Furness's agent had however, unknown to the candidate, hired a band of miners who went about the streets intimidating voters. The election was void for undue influence.				
Jan 1910	Kerry, Eastern	John Murphy and Daniel Collins	Eugene O'Sullivan	Violation of secrecy of the ballot; Personation; Undue influence; Employment of prohibited persons	Void election No by-election before December 1910 general election.
	Claims that O'Sullivan voted twice were disproved by the presiding officer at the polling station; nor had he illegally helped an illiterate voter to mark his ballot paper. There may have been personated votes cast, but O'Sullivan's campaign was not involved. Speeches by O'Sullivan had not threatened violence against his opponents. A crowd led by an agent of O'Sullivan's had threatened a group of Murphy's supporters, preventing them from voting; other voters were intimidated against going to the polls. O'Sullivan may have kicked opposing voters and fired pistol shots. The election was void for undue influence.				
Jan 1910	North Lonsdale	Joseph Bliss	George Bahr Haddock	Recount; Ballot papers erroneously counted or rejected	Duly elected
	The recount increased Haddock's majority from 69 to 169. Bliss then asked for the petition to be taken as a special case, which was allowed, but no new issues were raised.				
Dec 1910	Cheltenham	Edward Powell Smythies and John Richard Baker Claridge	Richard Mathias	False declaration of election expenses; illegal employment; illegal hiring	Void election
	At the end of the petitioners' case, counsel for Mathias accepted that at an early stage it had been proved that his campaign had exceeded the maximum of election expenses, and had submitted a false declaration to hide it. The campaign overspent on vehicles to carry voters to the polls. Mathias was personally unaware.				
Dec 1910	Chippenham	Bryn Hozier Freeman	George Terrell	Recount	Withdrawn
	The recount reduced Terrell's majority from 26 to 24, with 21 further ballot papers which had been rejected. As they could not overturn Terrell's majority, Freeman applied for and was given permission to withdraw the petition. Heard as a special case by request of the parties.				
Dec 1910	Cork, Eastern	Timothy Glavin and Thomas Coady	Captain Anthony John Charles Donelan	Intimidation; Bribery, etc.; personation; illegal payments; false declaration of election expenses	Void election
	Isolated acts of burning effigies of opponents and exhibiting coffins did not prove general intimidation. An "eccentric and irresponsible person" had offered a bribe unconnected with Donelan. Personation was not proved. Donelan ought not to have supplied food to people attending his meetings but it was not corrupt. Donelan's campaign had paid for vehicles to convey voters to the polls and also hired special trains. The account book of the campaign spending was said to have been routinely destroyed; the Judges found that it was deliberately destroyed to prevent illegal payments being proved; the submitted return must have been false.				
Dec 1910	Exeter	Henry Edward Duke	Richard Harold St. Maur	Scrutiny of votes	Undue election
	The original result and a recount both gave St. Maur a majority of 4 votes, with several papers left for the court to decide. A vote with "Up, Duke!" in addition to a cross in Duke's box was held bad because the voter might be identified. A voter who had moved into a house previously occupied by someone with the same surname, and voted in the name of the previous occupier, was entitled to do so because he was eligible to register. A voter who had voted twice in two different wards had one vote struck. A voter whose son was employed on election day was entitled to vote. Five people employed on St. Maur's campaign had voted and their votes were struck; a recriminatory case succeeded in striking off two votes from people employed by Duke's campaign and one whose son was employed. At the end of all objections, Duke had a majority of one vote.				
Dec 1910	Gloucester	Henry Finnis Blosse Lynch	Henry Terrell	Recount	Withdrawn
	The recount left Terrell's majority of four votes unchanged, and counsel for Lynch was granted permission to withdraw the petition.				
Dec 1910	Kingston upon Hull Central	Marriott Morley, Charles Wray, and Benjamin Musgrave	Sir Henry Seymour King	Bribery, etc.	Void election
	King had celebrated his 25th anniversary as MP for the constituency shortly before the election. To mark it, he had distributed coal to anyone receiving out-relief, and also sent sweets to all children in local schools. Although distribution was stopped immediately that the election was called, the distribution constituted corrupt treating.				
Dec 1910	King's Lynn	Harry Flanders, William Carter Watling, and Richard Senter	Holcombe Ingleby	Bribery, etc.; illegal hiring	Duly elected
	Ingleby was Mayor of King's Lynn in 1909–10 and gave a large amount of hospitality in his year in office, which he funded. However he took the Mayoralty before becoming a candidate, and the entertaining was not done with a corrupt intention to influence voters. The Judges found that a voter who was given a lift to the polls was taken not in a hired car but a personal car, which was not illegal.				
Dec 1910	Louth, Northern	Daniel Fearon, James Hanlon, Thomas Hanratty, and Patrick Larkin	Richard Hazleton	Intimidation; violation of secrecy of ballot; bribery, etc.; personation; illegal payments; false statement of fact	Void election
	Crowds did jeer voters known to oppose Hazleton, and some were assaulted, but not prevented from voting, so general intimidation was not proved. Only 12 ballot papers were exposed, and those accidentally. An unemployed voter was offered a job with the Dundalk Urban District Council by a councillor allied to Hazleton; this was bribery. Several voters were treated by police officers. Mobs under the control of agents of Hazleton threatened voters; this was undue influence. Campaign workers were illegally employed by the United Irish League rather than the agent. Two motor cars were apparently hired but there was no proof of the contract. A leaflet which stated that the family of Hazleton's opponent Tim Healy were all seeking government jobs was a false statement of fact.				
Dec 1910	Mile End	Bertram Stuart Straus	Hon. Harry Lawson Webster Lawson	Recount	Withdrawn
	The recount increased Lawson's majority from 2 to 6; counsel for Straus then applied for, and was given, permission to withdraw the petition.				
Dec 1910	Nottingham, East	George Goodall and Joseph Reid	Captain James Archibald Morrison	Bribery, etc.	Duly elected
	A large number of witnesses gave statements claiming to have been given 5s. for their votes, but they were paid for making the statements, and almost all when called as witnesses in the court gave evidence that their statements were not true. A small number of election payments were not returned as election expenses but it was a trivial amount. Morrison was the head of a charity which distributed gifts, and he probably intended to influence the constituency generally, but they were not individual bribes.				
Dec 1910	St. Pancras, West	John George Haller and William Lloyd-Taylor	Felix Maximilian Schoenbrunn Cassel	Recount	Withdrawn
	The recount increased Cassel's majority from 8 to 9. Counsel for the petitioners were then given permission to withdraw the petition.				
Dec 1910	West Bromwich	Alfred Ernest William Hazel	William Legge, Viscount Lewisham	Scrutiny of votes	Duly elected
	The initial result was a majority for Lewisham of 5; a recount increased it to 42. Several dubious ballot papers were held good. A voter said to have admitted he was employed by Lewisham's agent did not prove that he was, so his vote was good. The employment of a voter's 22-year-old son in the election did not invalidate his vote. A voter who was employed and who had cast a spoilt ballot did not mean that a good vote should be disallowed. People working for an advertising company contracted to post Lewisham's posters, and those paid as sandwich-board men, were not employed on the campaign and their votes were good. A voter paid for carrying a torch in a torchlight procession, and the organiser of the procession, had their votes struck. Other people who had worked on the campaign had their votes struck. At the end of the scrutiny Lewisham had a majority of 2.				
Dec 1910	West Ham, North	Edmond Johnson Boake and George Alfred Brabazon	Charles Frederick Gurney Masterman	False return of election expenses; exceeding maximum election expenses; illegal employment	Void election
	Masterman's election agent admitted in evidence that he had suffered a breakdown during the election. The court refused to give Masterman relief for the excess spending, accepting it did not have the power.				

== Petitions tried since 1922 ==
=== Glossary (by columns) ===
Allegation

- 'Bribery, etc.' : It was routine for election petitions in the 19th century brought on grounds of bribery also to make accusations of treating and undue influence. Some petitions were apparently written using boilerplate text.
- Personation: One person knowingly voting in the name of another.
- Scrutiny of votes: A process where the votes were recounted, the eligibility of each voter was checked, and ineligible votes struck off.
- Treating: The act of giving free food and drink with intent to persuade the recipient to vote for a particular candidate.
- Undue influence: Any attempt to win votes by threats.

Result

See above. This is also denoted by the colour of the corresponding row.

Details

- Agent: Anyone acting directly or indirectly on behalf of the candidates; not merely the designated election agent but anyone employed by the candidate. Many cases turned on whether a person proved to have carried out illegal activity was an agent (voiding the election) or was acting independently.
- Recriminatory case: Where a petition was presented by a defeated candidate claiming to have been the rightful winner (and not that the election be declared void), it was open to the Respondent to bring forward accusations against their election campaign.
- Relief: If certain aspects of election law have been broken through inadvertence, it is possible for those involved to be relieved from the consequences of breaking the law. The effect of relief is as if the breach of the law never occurred.
- Special case: Where the dispute in an election petition concerned a question of law and not the facts, it was referred to three Judges of the High Court of Justice (England and Wales), the Court of Session (Scotland), or the High Court of Justice in Ireland and its successor the High Court of Northern Ireland.

Election	Constituency	Petitioner(s)	Respondent(s)	Allegation ca	Result
1922	Berwick-upon-Tweed	Robert Carr Bosanquet and Bertram Fitzherbert Widdrington	Hilton Philipson	False return of election expenses; exceeding limit on election expenses; illegal hiring; payment other than through election agent	Void election
	Philipson's agent had ordered £164 15s. 1d. of printing work from George Martin, which resulted in him exceeding the maximum. In order to bring the return below, Martin agreed to reduce the amount on the invoice to £68 3s. 7d. The return also omitted £6 6s. 6d. on hire of motor cars, the salary of a woman organiser, and the hire of a room for election work. £4 for the hire of cars on election day was illegal hiring. Some expenses were paid through sub-agents, which was lawful; however there were payments made after the deadline. Philipson was unaware of the illegal practices.				
1922	Derbyshire, North-Eastern	Joseph Stanley Holmes	Frank Lee and Harry Reginald Cleaver, Returning Officer	Recount; erroneous counting of votes; mislaying votes	Duly elected
	The recount reduced Lee's majority from 5 to 3, with 63 votes for Lee and 56 for Holmes challenged and 76 rejected. The petition was heard as a special case. Three votes (2 for Lee, 1 for Holmes) had been found in the counting hall after the result had been declared; they were held good. 45 of the challenged votes for Holmes were good; 9 were void for want of official mark and 2 for uncertainty. 57 of the challenged votes for Lee were good; 6 were void for want of official mark. One of the rejected votes was held good for Holmes. This gave Lee a majority of 15. There were two ballot papers unaccounted for, but they could not affect Lee's majority. Of the 69 votes rejected for want of official mark, 38 were for Lee and 31 for Holmes, so they did not affect his majority.				
1923	Oxford	Hugh Hall and James Herbert Morrell	Frank Gray	False declaration of election expenses; exceeding limit on election expenses; payment other than through election agent; illegal hiring	Void election
	Gray's agent returned expenses in excess of the legal maximum, but sought relief on grounds of inadvertence; this application was ordered to stand over until the petition had been heard. The Judges found that the return was deliberately understated: an advertising bill of £91 2s. 0d. was returned as £72 17s. 7d.; printing costing £53 19s. 9d. was returned as £48 11s. 9d.; post cards costing £72 17s. 0d. were said to cost £40. The cost of distributing the post cards, £41 13s. 4d., was not returned when it ought to have been. A bill for printing from the Oxford Chronicle, originally £181 9s. 0d., was dishonestly reduced to £118 6s. 0d; a special edition of the paper costing £20 was also election expenses. The agent had deducted £4 from a bill for stationery in respect of items returned unused on which a refund was given; he was not entitled to do so. Various other items, including £2 for rent of committee rooms, and £15 7s. for two women and a youth working on the election, were added. Some payments were not made through the election agent. Paid distributors of election addresses were not illegal. Gray was exonerated of involvement.				
1929	Plymouth, Drake	Nicholas John Pethick Revington and Andrew Treeby Easterbrook	James John Hamlyn Moses	Bribery; illegal expenditure; illegal hiring; false return of election expenses; payment other than through election agent	Duly elected
	Albert Ballard was a well known philanthropist who had opened the Ballard Institute boys' club in Plymouth. He promised a firework display and celebration if Moses won, while threatening to close the club if Moses lost. However, no voter gave evidence that they were influenced in their vote by his actions, and he was not acting as Moses' agent when he spoke to the boys, so it was not bribery. Moses had tried to stop Ballard distributing a circular in his support, so he was not responsible for it and it was rightly excluded from the return of election expenses. A taxi was hired to help take voters to the polls by a sub-agent, which was illegal, but the agent was unaware and the Judges granted relief to those involved as they had broken the law through inadvertence. The return was not strictly compliant with proper form but relief was given.				
1955	Fermanagh and South Tyrone	Lt-Col Robert George Grosvenor	Philip Christopher Clarke	Candidate disqualified due to conviction for treason felony	Undue election
	Clarke had been convicted of three counts of treason felony as a participant in an armed raid on Omagh barracks, and on 15 December 1954 had been sentenced to 10 years' imprisonment. As such he was disqualified from election under the Forfeiture Act 1870. Grosvenor's agent had inserted adverts in the Tyrone Courier and Dungannon News, the Impartial Reporter and Farmers' Journal and the Tyrone Constitution drawing attention to Clarke's position and likely disqualification; the Fermanagh Herald and the Dungannon Observer had also reported that Clarke's supporters were aware people serving prison sentences of over a year were disqualified. Similar statements had been broadcast on the BBC and Radio Éireann. Grosvenor had also distributed 30,121 leaflets headed "Notice of disqualification of candidate" to people known not to be his supporters, and displayed posters outside most polling stations. The Judges were satisfied that those voting for Clarke knew he was disqualified and therefore threw away their votes.				
11 Aug 1955	Mid Ulster	Charles Beattie	Thomas James Mitchell	Candidate disqualified due to conviction for treason felony	Undue election
	Mitchell had been convicted of three counts of treason felony as a participant in an armed raid on Omagh barracks, and on 15 December 1954 had been sentenced to 10 years' imprisonment. As such he was disqualified from election under the Forfeiture Act 1870. He had previously been elected and disqualified by resolution of the House of Commons on 18 July 1955. The news of his disqualification had been widely reported in newspapers circulating in the constituency, in newspapers read by supporters of both Beattie and Mitchell, and had also been broadcast on the BBC and Radio Éireann. During the by-election campaign the Ulster Herald, which circulated among Mitchell's supporters, had again reported that Mitchell was in prison. Beattie's election address had asserted Mitchell's disqualification. The Judges were satisfied that those voting for Mitchell knew he was disqualified and therefore threw away their votes.				
1959	Kensington, North	Sir Oswald Ernald Mosley, Bt.	George Henry Roland Rogers and Arthur Newton Edward McHaffie, returning officer	Voters not crossed off as voting; ballots improperly transported to the count; improper count arrangements; admission of improper persons to the count	Duly elected
	Mosley had conducted a survey of those not marked as voting, and 111 said they had in fact voted. Only 10 were willing to be called as witnesses, and five then said they had not actually voted. Of the other five, their votes were good and there was no evidence they had taken advantage of their name not being crossed off, in order to vote more than once. There was no rule requiring police to accompany ballot boxes from polling stations to the count. Ivor Richard, a candidate in Kensington, South, together with a counting agent for that constituency, had wrongly been allowed into the count but they had not interfered with it, so it did not affect the result.				
4 May 1961	Bristol, South-East	Malcolm Archibald James St. Clair and John Malcolm Harris	Hon. Anthony Neil Wedgwood Benn, Viscount Stansgate	Candidate disqualified as a Peer	Undue election
	Main article: Re Bristol South-East Parliamentary Election Benn had succeeded to the peerage as Viscount Stansgate on the death of his father on 17 November 1960; notwithstanding the fact that he had not applied for a writ of summons to the House of Lords, he was disqualified from the House of Commons. St. Clair had widely advertised in the press and displayed notices drawing attention to Benn's position and disqualification. The Judges were satisfied that those voting for Benn knew he was disqualified and therefore threw away their votes.				
1964	Kinross and West Perthshire	Christopher Murray Grieve	The Rt Hon. Sir Alexander Frederick Douglas-Home KT	Expenses incurred without authority of election agent; False return of election expenses	Duly elected
	The BBC and ITA had incurred costs transmitting party political broadcasts in which Douglas-Home had appeared as Leader of the Conservative Party. Because the broadcasts were aimed at the whole of the country, they were not aimed at promoting the election of Douglas-Home in the constituency, so the cost of the broadcasts were not election expenses within the meaning of the statute.				
28 Jul 1983	Penrith and the Border	Lt-Comm. Eric Wilfred Morgan DSC	David John Maclean	Illegal election expenses; false declaration of election expenses; false statement of fact; undue influence	Duly elected
	No evidence could be found to support the claims of illegal spending on committee rooms; the return of election expenses was accurate. The omission of Morgan from a list of candidates published in The Daily Telegraph was unfortunate but only an irritation, and did not amount to a false statement of fact on the part of Maclean. Claims that Viscount Whitelaw exercised undue influence in supporting Maclean were "an enormous impertinence" which should never have been made.				
1992	Belfast, West	Maura McCrory	Dr. Joseph Gerard Hendron and Thomas Kelly	Failure to return election expenses or pay election expenses within the time limit; exceeding maximum election expenses	Duly elected
	Hendron's election agent, Thomas Kelly, was a novice who was the only volunteer for the job after previous agents had been attacked by thugs. The return of election expenses had not included £703.25 of printing and advertisements, £40 for minibus hire, and £88.12 for public address system hire. A discount given on advertising in the Irish News, and spending on election surveys, were not election expenses. Bills settled through the treasurer of the constituency council were still made through the election agent; however not all bills were settled within the time limit. Both Hendron and Kelly applied for relief on the grounds that the breaches were inadvertent; in the circumstances of the pressure on Kelly and his ignorance of the law, the court granted relief on all items.				
1997	Winchester	Gerald Peter Malone	Mark Oaten and Lindsay Garrett Fox, returning officer	Failure to stamp ballot papers with the official mark; improper rejection of votes; personation; failure to count tendered ballots	Void election
	Four voters cast tendered ballots after claiming to have been personated, but the personators could not be found and the allegation was not pursued. 56 ballot papers had not been stamped with the official mark; had they been held good, Oaten's majority of 2 would have been reversed and Malone would have had a majority of 2. A special case determined that the possibility that the failure to stamp the ballot papers resulted from errors by the returning officer's staff meant that the result could not be certain.				
2001	Fermanagh and South Tyrone	James Leslie Cooper	Michelle Gildernew	Failure to close poll on time; ballot papers issued and votes cast after close of the poll	Duly elected
	At the polling station in Garrison, County Fermanagh, a queue of 40–50 people were waiting to vote at 10 PM when the poll should have closed. The presiding officer stopped issuing ballot papers at 10 PM, but was then confronted by the crowd and supporters of Gildernew who demanded to be able to vote. The presiding officer, described as "petrified" by one of the police on duty, gave way and allowed 15–20 people to vote before being ordered by the area electoral office to stop. Because the number of ballot papers issued was less than Gildernew's majority of 53, election was still conducted substantially according to law.				
2010	Fermanagh and South Tyrone	Rodney Connor	Michelle Gildernew, Douglas Bain (Chief Electoral Officer), and Martin Fox (Deputy Returning Officer)	Errors in issuing ballot papers; ballot papers wrongly counted and rejected	Duly elected
	Some ballot boxes contained more ballot papers than verified as having been issued, involving a total of 36 votes. 24 of the votes were a result of voters putting their ballot paper in the wrong box at a polling station where there were multiple boxes. In another polling station there was an excess of 8 votes; the Judges rejected claims that they had been surreptitiously added, and decided that they had not been accurately recorded. Another box had missed a single vote, so there were only 3 unaccounted additional votes; there were innocent explanations which could explain them. Connor had not identified four votes which he contended ought not to have been counted for Gildernew, so the challenge could not be sustained. Two votes claimed to be on poor quality paper and therefore counterfeit could not be traced. When the third recount produced the same result as the second recount, the Returning Officer was right to refuse a fourth recount. As the 3 unaccounted additional votes were less than Gildernew's majority, the result would not have been affected.				
2010	Oldham East and Saddleworth	Robert Elwyn James Watkins	Philip James Woolas	False statement of fact	Void election
	Leaflets issued by Woolas claimed that Watkins sought the support of Muslims who advocated violence, that Watkins had refused to condemn death threats against Woolas, and that Watkins had reneged on a promise to live in the constituency. All three statements were false statements of fact about Watkins which attacked his personal character, and Woolas did not believe them to be true. A rhetorical question asking whether Watkins' campaign had been funded by illegal and undeclared foreign donations was also a false statement of fact attacking Watkins' personal character, but Woolas may have had reasonable grounds for believing it to be true. Woolas subsequently sought a judicial review of the findings, and was granted permission to bring the action; the High Court ruled that the statement that Watkins had reneged on a promise to live in the constituency concerned his political actions and did not therefore come under the Act, but upheld the other two statements and the avoidance of the election.				
2015	Orkney and Shetland	Timothy Denis Morrison, Euphemia Matheson, Fiona Morag Grahame, and Carolyn Ann Welling	Alexander Morrison Carmichael	False statement of fact	Duly elected
	Carmichael's statement that he had first become aware of the leak of a memorandum from the Scotland Office was a false statement of fact, but it did not concern his personal character or conduct. A preliminary hearing determined that statements made by a candidate about themselves, and false statements to the credit of a candidate, are covered by the prohibition on false statements of fact.				

== Petitions withdrawn before trial (1868–) ==
In some cases a petition was presented and security for costs was given, but the petitioner applied to withdraw the petition before trial. The following lists all petitions which were withdrawn that had been tabled following the passing of the Parliamentary Elections Act 1868.

- 1868: Athlone. John Stamforth v. John James Ennis.
- 1868: Boston. Thomas Mason Jones v. John Wingfield Malcolm and Thomas Collins.
- 1868: Bradford (No. 3). Samuel Storey and Thomas Garnett v. Rt. Hon. William Edward Forster.
- 1868: Cambridge. Daniel Lloyd and John Brown v. Robert Richard Torrens and William Fowler.
- 1868: Carlow. Richard Boardman v. William Fagan.
- 1868: Christchurch. Harcourt Pauncefoot Popham v. Edmund Haviland Burke.
- 1868: Derbyshire, Northern (No. 1). William Longsdon and others v. Augustus Peter Arkwright.
- 1868: Derbyshire, Northern (No. 2). John Broxup Coates and another v. Lord George Henry Cavendish.
- 1868: Dublin City (No. 2). Hon. David Robert Plunket v. Jonathan Pim.
- 1868: Dumfriesshire. George Gustavus Walker v. Sir Sydney Hedley Waterlow.
- 1868: Durham, Southern. John Cary Hendy and William Watson Brown v. Joseph W. Pease and Frederick Blackett Beaumont.
- 1868: Enniskillen. George Kittson and Thomas Johnston v. John Henry, Viscount Crichton.
- 1868: Gloucester. Francis Niblett and others v. William Philip Price and Charles James Monk.
- 1868: Hampshire, Southern (No. 1). John Watkins Drew v. Lord Henry Scott.
- 1868: Hampshire, Southern (No. 2). Charles Castleman and Arthur Frederick Naghton v. Rt. Hon. William Francis Cowper.
- 1868: The Hartlepools. William Gray and others v. Ralph Ward Jackson.
- 1868: Horsham (No. 1). Charles Spencer Scrace Dickins and another v. Robert Henry Hurst.
- 1868: Kingston upon Hull. Joseph Walker Pease and others v. Charles Morgan Norwood and James Clay.
- 1868: Pembroke. William Hughes v. Thomas Meyrick.
- 1868: Preston. Joseph Toulmin and Richard Pemberton v. Edward Hermon and Sir Thomas George Fermor Hesketh, Bt.
- 1868: Shrewsbury. Thomas Young and James Coch v. James Figgins.
- 1868: County Sligo (No. 1). John Hannon and James Casey v. Sir Robert Gore Booth, Bt.
- 1868: County Sligo (No. 2). Henry Griffith v. Denis Maurice O'Connor.
- 1868: Stockport (No. 1). James Walton and William Jones v. John Benjamin Smith.
- 1868: Stockport (No. 2). Ephraim Hallam and John Eskrigge v. William Tipping.
- 1868: Taunton (No. 1). John Dyke and William Oaten v. Alexander Charles Barclay.
- 1868: Taunton (No. 3). John Dyke and William Oaten v. Alexander Charles Barclay.
- 1868: Thirsk. Frederic Bell and others v. Sir William Payne Gallwey, Bt.
- 1868: Warwickshire, Southern. William Colley and others v. John Hardy.
- 1868: Wick Burghs. Edmund Beatty Lockyer v. George Loch.
- 1868: York (No. 1). T. H. Gladstone v. James Lowther.
- 1868: York (No. 2). John Burrill v. Joshua Proctor Brown-Westhead.
- 24 April 1869: Brecon. David Evans, David Williams, Rees Price and Edward Williams v. Edward Hyde Villiers, Lord Hyde.
- 6 February 1872: County Kerry. Thomas Duckett Maybury and Maurice Harman v. Rowland Ponsonby Blennerhassett.
- 16 April 1873: County Tyrone. John William Ellison Macartney v. Capt. Hon. Henry William Lowry Corry.
- 1874: Ayr Burghs. Edward Henry John Craufurd v. Sir William James Montgomery Cuninghame, Bt.
- 1874: Durham, Southern. Henry Edward Surtees, William Culley Stobart and George Anthony Leaton Blenkinsopp v. Joseph Whitwell Pease and Frederick Edward Blackett Beaumont.
- 1874: Isle of Wight. Hon. A.E.M. Ashley v. A.B. Cochrane.
- 1874: County Kerry. Maurice James O'Connell, James Egan, John Harrison, and Maurice Walsh v. Henry Arthur Herbert and Rowland Ponsonby Blennerhassett.
- 1874: Kidderminster. H.R. Willis and another v. Albert Grant.
- 1874: County Leitrim. Francis O'Beirne v. William Richard Ormsby Gore (The trial judge refused permission for the petition to be listed for trial).
- 1874: Pembroke. G. White v. Edward James Reed.
- 1874: Stockport. John Oldfield and James Kirk v. Charles Henry Hopwood and Frederick Pennington.
- 26 May 1874: Poole. Sir I.B. Guest, Bt. v. Hon. A.M. Ashley.
- 22 June 1874: Durham, Northern. Edward Pickering and William Williams v. Charles Mark Palmer.
- 1880: Bandon. John Corcoran v. Percy B. Bernard.
- 1880: Bury St Edmunds. W.H. Rushbrooke and another v. J.A. Hardcastle.
- 1880: Cheshire, Western. J. Ledsham and another v. W.F.Tollemache and another.
- 1880: Colchester. Thomas May, John Lay, Alfred Robert Staines, James Watson, William Moseley Tabrum and Frederick Abraham Cole v. William Willis.
- 1880: Dunbartonshire. John William Burns v. Archibald Orr-Ewing.
- 1880: Hereford. J.B. Preece and others v. J. Pulley and another.
- 1880: Horsham. T.W. Cowan and others v. Sir H. Fletcher.
- 1880: Leominster. S.W. Johnson and another v. J. Rankin.
- 1880: Londonderry City. John Boyle and William Conaghan v. Charles Edward Lewis.
- 1880: Londonderry County. James Forrest and Thomas Walker v. Rt. Hon. Hugh Law and Sir Thomas McClure, Bt.
- 1880: Nottingham. P. Isaac and another v. C. Seely and another. Although the Judges passed on a letter reporting rumours that the Respondents had paid £10,000 to secure the withdrawal of the petition, they stated that they had no reason to believe it to be true.
- 1880: Stroud. W. Smith v. W.J. Stenton and another.
- 1880: County Wicklow. William Wentworth FitzWilliam Dick v. James Carlisle McCoan and Howard Brooke.
- 1880: Wilton. S.B. Wilson v. Hon. S. Herbert.
- 1892: Halifax. Alfred Arnold v. William Rawson Shaw.
- 1892: Lichfield. Sir John Swinburne, Bt. v. Major Darwin.
- 1895: Durham. Arthur Ralph Douglas Elliot v. Matthew Fowler.
- 1895: Edinburgh, South. Robert Burn and Joseph Train Gray v. Robert Cox.
- 1895: Southampton (No. 1). Sir Francis Henry Evans v. Tankerville Chamberlayne and Sir John Stephen Barrington Simeon, Bt.
- 1900: Wick Burghs. James Edward Harper and others v. Arthur Bignold. (The petitioner was substituted by Thomas Charles Hunter Hedderwick.)
- 14 July 1988: Kensington. Phylip Andrew David Hobson v. John Dudley Fishburn. Ordered to be struck out on the motion of the respondent: the petitioner was aged 19 so he could not lodge a petition claiming to have been elected, as the Parliamentary Elections Act 1695 set the minimum age at 21. Hobson attempted to withdraw the petition and substitute a new one in which he would petition as an elector, but he was out of time to do so.
- 2015: Mid Bedfordshire. Timothy Scott Ireland v Nadine Vanessa Dorries. Ordered to be struck out on the motion of the respondent: the petition was not served on the respondent according to law as it was delivered to her constituency office rather than her home address.
- 6 June 2019: Peterborough. Michael Greene v. Lisa Forbes.

== See also ==
- Corrupt practices
- Election court
- Election fraud
- Parliamentary Elections Corrupt Practices Act 1885

== Sources ==
- Command — Command paper with the report of a special commission to enquire into the corruption found by the petition judgment.
- Craig, F. W. S. (1974). British Parliamentary Election Results 1885–1918. Macmillan. ISBN 9781349022984.
- Craig, F. W. S. (1977). British Parliamentary Election Results 1832–1885. Basingstoke: Macmillan.
- Day — Day, Samuel H. (1894). Election cases in 1892 and 1893: being a collection of the points of law and practice arising out of the parliamentary election petitions in those years, together with reports of the judgments. London: Stevens and Sons.
- Fitzgerald — FitzGerald, Baron FitzGerald, John (1869). The judgments of Mr Baron Fitzgerald, in the cases of the election petitions for the boroughs of Limerick, Belfast, and Cashel.
- HCP/HLP — House of Commons Papers/House of Lords Papers. Until 1911 the House of Commons published the judgments of most election courts in the sessional papers. Some were also printed by the House of Lords. The year of the session is given and the number of the paper, followed by the relevant pages in the case where multiple judgments are in a single paper.
- Helmore, Leonard Mervyn (1967). Corrupt and illegal practices: a general survey and a case study of an election petition. London: Routledge & Kegan Paul. ISBN 978-0-7100-5124-0 – via Internet Archive.
- O'M & H — O'Malley, Edwin L.; Hardcastle, Henry (1870–1929). Reports of the Decisions of the Judges for the trial of Election Petitions in England and Ireland as pursuant to the Parliamentary Elections Act 1868. London: Stevens & Haynes. 7 volumes: (
  - 1870: Vol 1 (1869)
  - 1875: Vol 2 (1870–6 Aug 1874)
  - 1881: Vol 3 (8 Aug 1874–2 Dec 1880)
  - 1893: Vol 4 (23 Mar 1881–11 Aug 1893)
  - 1910: Vol. 5
  - 1911: Vol. 6
  - 1929: Vol. 7
  ) e.g. 1 O'M & H 281 = Volume 1, p. 281
