= Corrupt and Illegal Practices Prevention Act 1883 =

Act of the Parliament of the United Kingdom reforming the electoral system

Corrupt and Illegal Practices Prevention Act 1883 (Note: Section 65(3).)
- Act of Parliament
- Parliament of the United Kingdom
- Long title: An Act for the better prevention of Corrupt and Illegal Practices at Parliamentary Elections.
- Citation: 46 & 47 Vict. c. 51
- Territorial extent: United Kingdom

Dates
- Royal assent: 25 August 1883
- Commencement: 15 October 1883 (Note: Section 67.)
- Expired: 31 December 1884 (Note: Section 70)
- Repealed: Northern Ireland: 13 April 1976; England and Wales: 1 January 1982; Scotland: 29 September 1988
Other legislation
Amended by	Corrupt and Illegal Practices Prevention Act 1895; Costs in Criminal Cases Act 1908; Perjury Act 1911; False Oaths (Scotland) Act 1933; Representation of the People Act 1918; Representation of the People Act 1948; Representation of the People Act 1949
Repealed by	Northern Ireland: Electoral Law (Northern Ireland) Act 1962 and Statute Law Revision Act (Northern Ireland) Act 1976; England and Wales: Senior Courts Act 1981; Scotland: Court of Session Act 1988
Relates to	Ballot Act 1872; Parliamentary Elections Corrupt Practices Act 1885

Status: Repealed

Text of statute as originally enacted

The Corrupt and Illegal Practices Prevention Act 1883 (46 & 47 Vict. c. 51) or the Corrupt Practices Act 1883 was an act of the Parliament of the United Kingdom of Great Britain and Ireland. It was a continuation of policy to make voters free from the intimidation of landowners and politicians. It criminalised attempts to bribe voters and standardised the amount that could be spent on election expenses.

== Background ==
Despite the Ballot Act 1872 (35 & 36 Vict. c. 33) introduced secret ballots, William Ewart Gladstone's Second Ministry (1880–85) knew that, to make voting less corrupt, further measures were required to eradicate intimidation and bribery.

The act meant that the expenses of candidates were published and could be measured against a limit as to how much could be spent on "political campaigns". It laid down rules for the conduct of parliamentary candidates, including a strict limit on expenses. The limit was set at £710 for the first 2,000 voters in the candidate's constituency, and then £40 for every additional 1,000 voters. Each candidate was limited to just one party agent (though in exceptional circumstances the candidate did have the right to petition Parliament for more). Strict record keeping was required as proof that expenses were not being exceeded. Under the act stiff penalties were imposed on those breaking it such as heavy fines and imprisonment. Poorer men could also become parliamentary candidates.

Although it did not entirely remove corruption from the voting system, it strengthened the Corrupt Practices Prevention Act 1854 (17 & 18 Vict. c. 102) and was aided by a number of disenfranchised, small boroughs.

== Subsequent developments ==
The Parliamentary Elections Corrupt Practices Act 1885(48 & 49 Vict. c. 56) clarified that an employer was legally permitted to give paid time off from work to allow employees to vote, so long as this was given equally to all voters and not along party lines.

The act, except section 42, was repealed by section 21(2) of, and the schedule to, the Election Commissioners Act 1949 (12, 13 & 14 Geo. 6. c. 90), which came into force on 23 February 1950..

The whole act, so far as unrepealed, was repealed for Northern Ireland by section 1 of, and part V of schedule 1 to, the Statute Law Revision (Northern Ireland) Act 1976, which came into force on 13 April 1976.

Section 42 of the act was repealed for England and Wales by section 152(4) of, and schedule 7 to, the Senior Courts Act 1981, which came into force on 1 January 1982.

The whole act was repealed for Scotland by section 52(2) of, and part I of schedule 2 to, the Court of Session Act 1988, which came into force on 29 September 1988.

== See also ==
- Corrupt practices
- Corrupt Practices Act 1695
- Corrupt Practices Act 1868
- List of UK parliamentary election petitions
- Reform Acts
- Representation of the People Act
