= Parliamentary Elections Corrupt Practices Act 1885 =

Act of the Parliament of the United Kingdom

Parliamentary Elections Corrupt Practices Act 1885 (Note: Section 3.)
- Act of Parliament
- Parliament of the United Kingdom
- Long title: An Act to amend the Law with respect to Corrupt Practices at Parliamentary Elections.
- Citation: 48 & 49 Vict. c. 56
- Territorial extent: United Kingdom

Dates
- Royal assent: 6 August 1885
- Commencement: 6 August 1885 (Note: The Acts of Parliament (Commencement) Act 1793.)
- Repealed: 3 April 1950 (Note: The Representation of the People Act 1949 (Date of Commencement) Order 1950.)
Other legislation
Repealed by	Representation of the People Act 1949
Relates to	Parliamentary Voters Registration Act 1843; Ballot Act 1872; Corrupt and Illegal Practices Prevention Act 1883; Redistribution of Seats Act 1885; Parliamentary Elections (Returning Officers) Act 1885

Status: Repealed

Text of statute as originally enacted

The Parliamentary Elections Corrupt Practices Act 1885 (48 & 49 Vict. c. 56) was an act of the Parliament of the United Kingdom. It became law on 6 August 1885.

It declared, in order to clarify past ambiguities, that it was legal for an employer to allow his employees a reasonable amount of paid time off work in order to vote in a parliamentary election. This permission was, as far as reasonably possible, to be given to all employees, and not to be given in order to induce them to vote for a specific candidate, or refused to discourage them from voting for another.

It did not criminalise any previously legitimate activity.

== Subsequent developments ==
The whole act was repealed by section 175(1) of, and the ninth schedule to, the Representation of the People Act 1949 (12, 13 & 14 Geo. 6. c. 68), which came into force on 3 April 150.

== See also ==
- List of UK parliamentary election petitions

== Bibliography ==
- Oliver & Boyd's new Edinburgh almanac and national repository for the year 1886. Oliver & Boyd, Edinburgh, 1886
