= Richard Atwood Glass =

English manufacturer and politician

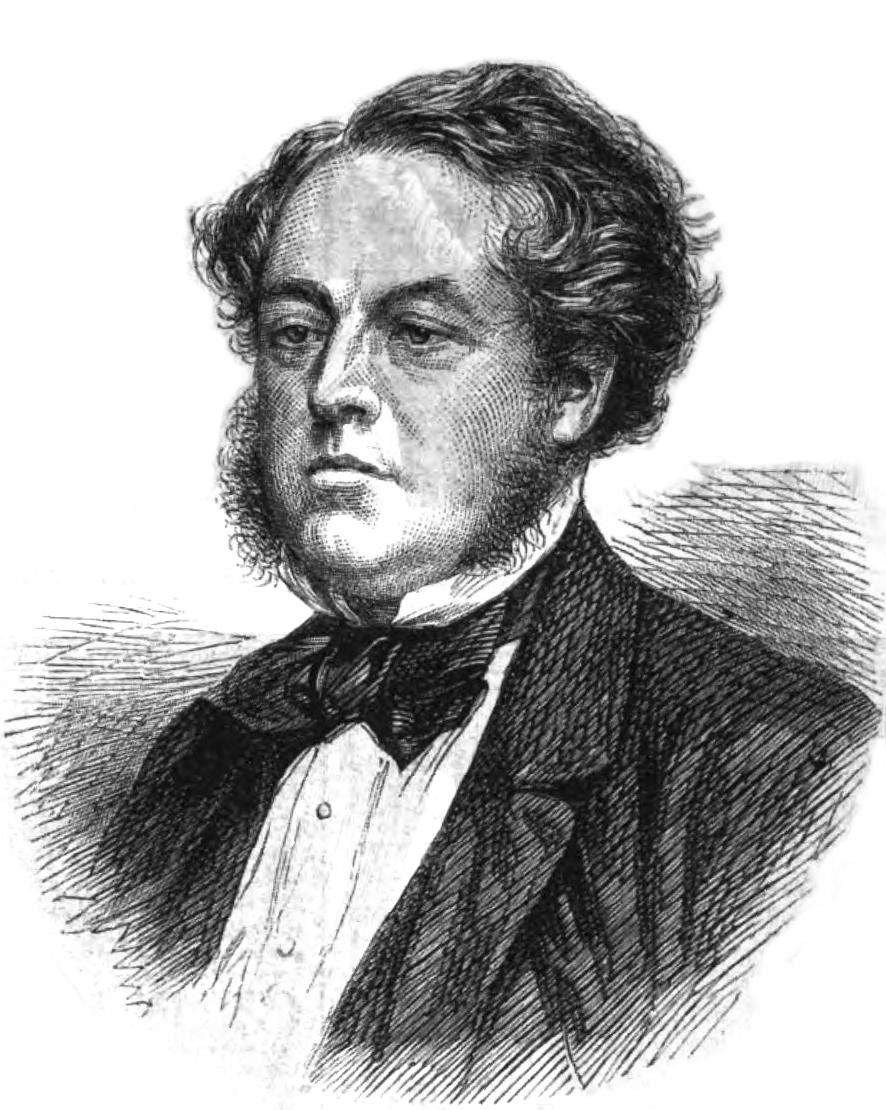
Richard Atwood Glass, 1866 engraving (The Illustrated London News)

Sir Richard Atwood Glass (1820 – 22 December 1873) was an English businessman whose companies made submarine telegraph cables, including half of the first successful transatlantic cable.

== Biography ==
Glass was born at Turleigh, near Bradford on Avon in Wiltshire, the son of Francis Glass. He was educated at King's College London.

n 1846, with George Elliot, he provided capital for an insolvent wire-rope manufacturers Heimann & Kuper, and by 1851 the firm was trading as Glass, Elliott & Company. The company produced submarine communications cables and in 1854 ran a circuit from Denmark to Sweden and undertook the manufacture of long cables for the French Mediterranean Telegraph Company of J. W. Brett. The cables with a resin-insulated conducting wire protected by an armour of iron wire proved to be long-lasting, and in the later 1850s the company introduced anti-corrosive compounds to coat the finished cable. The firm merged with the Gutta Percha Company in 1864, and Glass became managing director of the resulting Telegraph Construction & Maintenance Company. This company provided half of the first transatlantic telegraph cable and all the cable laid by the Great Eastern in 1866. Glass was knighted for these services on 26 November 1867.

In the 1868 general election Glass was elected member of parliament for Bewdley in Worcestershire. He was unseated on 16 February 1869 when the election was declared void.

Glass lived at Ashurst in Dorking, Surrey. He died on 22 December 1873, aged 53, of chronic Bright's disease at his home at South Stoneham, Hampshire.

Parliament of the United Kingdom
| Preceded by Sir Thomas Winnington | Member of Parliament for Bewdley; 1868 – 1869 | Succeeded by John Pickersgill-Cunliffe |
