= 1869 Bewdley by-election =

UK parliamentary by-election

The 1869 Bewdley by-election was held on 11 March 1869. The Parliamentary by-election was called due to the voiding of the 1868 election of the incumbent MP, the Conservative Party's Richard Atwood Glass. It was won by the Conservative Party candidate John Cunliffe.

On petition Cunliffe was unseated and his liberal opponent Augustus Anson was declared elected. He was re-elected in the 1874 general election.

By-election, 11 Mar 1869: Bewdley
Party	Candidate	Votes	%	±%
Conservative	John Pickersgill-Cunliffe	477	50.7	−4.6
Liberal	Augustus Anson	463	49.3	+4.6
Majority		14	1.4	−9.2
Turnout		940	90.1	+0.4
Registered electors		1,043		
Conservative hold		Swing	+4.6	
