= Richard Dyott (died 1891) =

English politician

Richard Dyott (1808 – 13 February 1891) was an English Conservative Party politician who sat in the House of Commons from 1865 to 1880.

Dyott was the son of General William Dyott of Freeford Hall, Staffordshire and his wife Eleanor Thompson daughter of Samuel Thompson of Greenmount, co. Antrim. He was educated at Westminster School and at Trinity College, Cambridge. He entered the army as Ensign in the 53rd Foot in October 1827, became lieutenant in June 1831, and captain in August 1838.

Dyott stood unsuccessfully for parliament at South Staffordshire in August 1837, and at Lichfield in July 1841. In 1842 he retired from the army on half-pay. He was a deputy lieutenant and J.P. for Staffordshire and was High Sheriff of Staffordshire in 1856. He was Lieutenant-colonel of the Staffordshire Militia.

At the 1865 general election Dyott was elected member of parliament for Lichfield. He retained the seat after representation was reduced to one member in 1868 and held it until 1880. He was elected at the 1880 general election but his election was declared void on 5 July.

Dyott died at Freeford at the age of 82 and was buried at night in the family vault under St Mary's Church, Lichfield according to a family tradition since the Commonwealth.

Dyott married Ellen Catherine Foster, daughter of Charles Smith Foster of Lysway's Hall, Lichfield in 1849.

Parliament of the United Kingdom
Preceded by Lord Alfred Henry Paget; Augustus Anson	Member of Parliament for Lichfield; 1865–1880; With: Augustus Anson to 1868	Succeeded by Theophilus John Levett
