= 1869 Stafford by-election =

UK Parliamentary by-election

The 1869 Stafford by-election was fought on 7 June 1869. The by-election was fought due to the Void election of the incumbent MP of the Conservative Party, Walter Meller. It was won by the Conservative candidate Thomas Salt.
