= John Pickersgill-Cunliffe =

British politician

Member of Parliament for Bewdley
- In office 11 March 1869 – 30 April 1869
- Preceded by: Richard Atwood Glass
- Succeeded by: Augustus Anson

Personal details
- Born: 23 March 1819
- Died: 6 October 1873 (aged 54) Guy's Hospital, London
- Resting place: Coulsdon
- Party: Conservative
- Spouse: Helen Hutton Dale (m. 1849)
- Children: 16
- Occupation: Banker
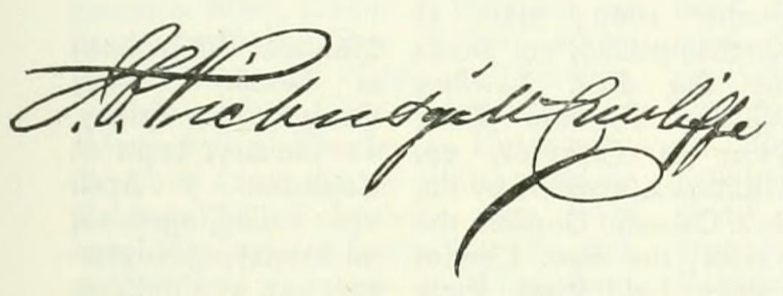
- Signature

John Cunliffe Pickersgill-Cunliffe (born John Cunliffe Pickersgill; 28 March 1819 – 6 October 1873) was a British banker, who briefly served as member of parliament for Bewdley in 1869, representing the Conservative Party.

== Personal life ==
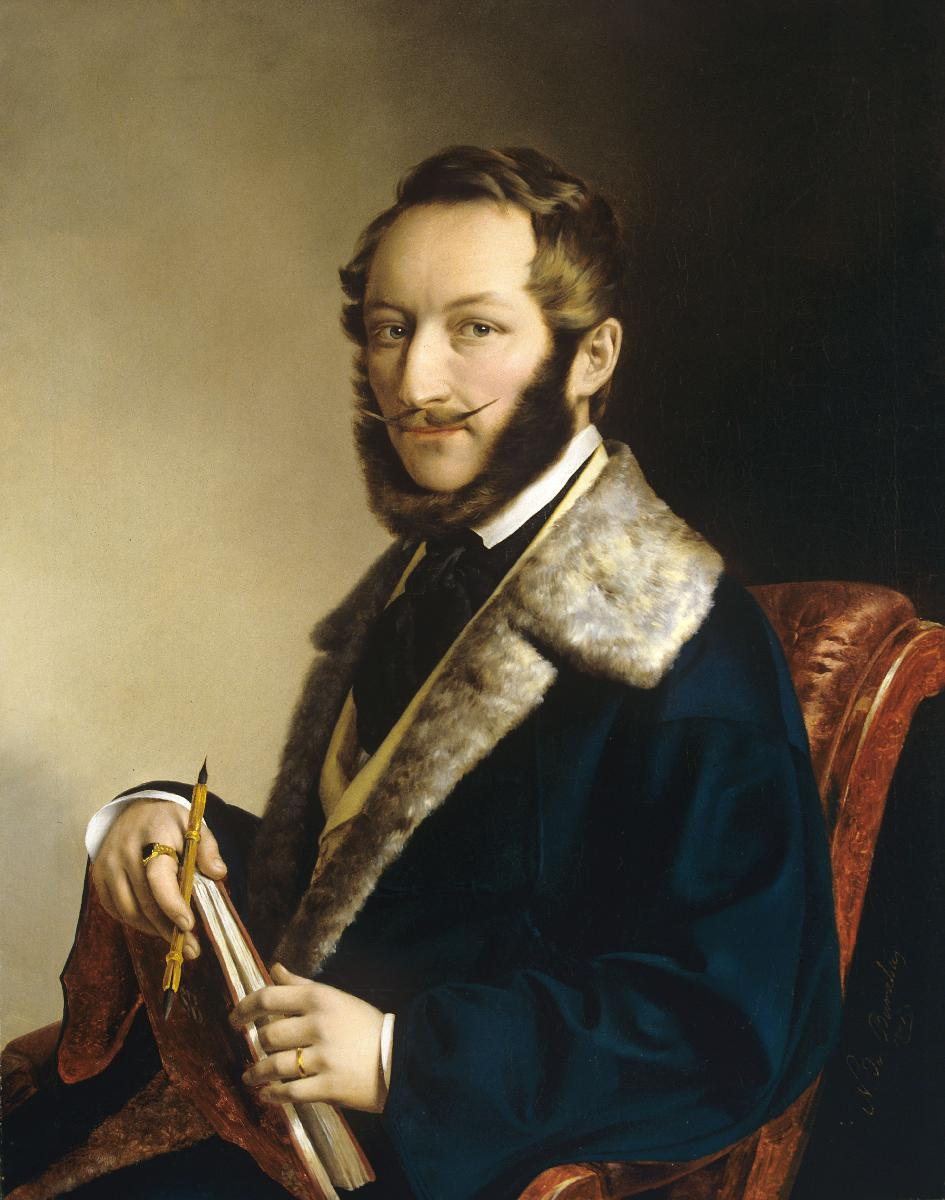
Pickersgill-Cunliffe was a friend of Miklós Barabás who is pictured in this self portrait

John Cunliffe Pickersgill was born on 28 March 1819 to John Pickersgill, a banker, and Sophia née Cunliffe; he had an elder brother, William Cunliffe Pickersgill, one of nine siblings. He was baptised on 10 June at St Lawrence Jewry, London. Pickersgill-Cunliffe assumed Cunliffe as a second surname on 6 March 1867, having inherited the Spaldington estate of a maternal aunt. He married Helen Hutton Dale, daughter of Thomas Dale, Dean of Rochester Cathedral, on 30 January 1849. The wedding, at St Pancras New Church, was conducted by Helen's brother Pelham Dale. They had sixteen children, including Harry Pickersgill-Cunliffe in 1858; he later became a justice of the peace for Ramsgate.

Pickersgill-Cunliffe purchased Hooley House in Coulsdon from the London and Brighton Railway in 1844. He lived there until 1858. He also maintained a home in Addingham, West Yorkshire, and in Portland Place, London. Portraits of Pickersgill-Cunliffe and his wife were painted by his friend the Hungarian artist Miklós Barabás, and as of 1893 were held at Northwood Hall, London.

== Business ==
Pickersgill-Cunliffe was head of John Pickersgill & Sons, an American banking company. He dissolved the firm upon retiring c.1870, with what The Bankers' Magazine called "a large fortune". At his death his estate was valued at £160,000, equivalent to £15,041,281 in 2025. Pickersgill-Cunliffe hosted his friend Barabás when the latter visited England in 1843, and assisted in selling prints of his paintings. The banker had several ties to Hungary, serving at one time as head of the Anglo-Hungarian Institute. This was a group that promoted the sale of Hungarian products such as wool in Britain, albeit mostly unsuccessfully.

== Election ==
In 1869, a by-election was held in the Bewdley constituency, after the victory of Richard Atwood Glass in the 1868 general election was declared void. Pickersgill-Cunliffe was elected in the by-election, only for his victory to also be declared void on petition later that year, in favour of Augustus Anson. Pickersgill-Cunliffe served as an MP for only six weeks, from 11 March until 30 April 1869.

== Death ==
Pickersgill-Cunliffe was struck by the 7am train from Hastings at Caterham Junction railway station (now known as Purley station) on 22 September 1873, at 10.01 near his home in Coulsdon, Surrey. In attempting to get out of the way of the train he was hit by the step on the side of the engine. Having had both legs amputated in Guy's Hospital, he died there two weeks later, on 6 October. An inquest recorded a verdict of accidental death. At the time there was no bridge or underpass between two of the station's four platforms requiring passengers who wished to transfer between them to walk across the line.

Pickersgill-Cunliffe was buried at Coulsdon on 11 October, with his will being proved on 25 October.

== Citations ==
Parliament of the United Kingdom
Preceded by Richard Atwood Glass	Member of Parliament for Bewdley; 1869	Succeeded by Augustus Anson
