= Theophilus John Levett =

British politician (1829–1899)

Colonel Theophilus John Levett (11 December 1829 – 27 February 1899) was a Conservative Party politician in the United Kingdom, who served as Member of Parliament (MP) for Lichfield from 1880 to 1885.

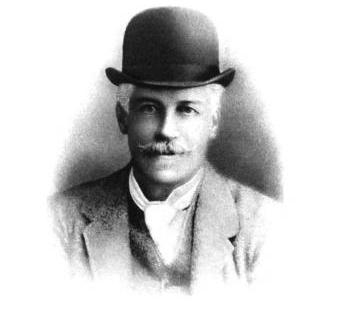
Colonel Theophilus John Levett, ca. 1879

== Life ==
Levett was the son of John Levett of Wychnor Park, Staffordshire and his wife Sophia Eliza Kennedy, the daughter of Hon. Robert Kennedy, third son of Archibald Kennedy, 11th Earl of Cassilis. Levett was a Captain in the 1st Life Guards and inherited Wychnor on the death of his father. Levett also owned Smallwood Manor at Uttoxeter. He was elected as the MP for Lichfield in at a by-election in July 1880, but when the parliamentary borough of Lichfield was abolished at the 1885 general election, he did not stand again. He was a JP and DL for Staffordshire and served on Staffordshire County Council for Lichfield from 1889 until his death in 1899. Originally from Sussex, Levett's ancestors came to Staffordshire in the eighteenth century.

Capt. Theophilus Levett was, unsurprisingly for the era, a fox-hunter, and he was long associated with the Meynell hounds, the fox-hunting group established by Hugo Meynell, who had defeated Capt. Levett's father John when he ran to keep his seat in Parliament. "He was a remarkably good shot," noted an obituary of Levett, "and the way he used to work his coverts made the hearts of true sportsmen to rejoice." (The covert, in fox-hunting jargon, means a patch of woods or brush where a fox might be found.)

Having retired from the 1st Life Guards, Capt Levett was commissioned as a Lieutenant in the Stafford Troop of the part-time Staffordshire Yeomanry on 10 June 1858; he was promoted to Captain of the Lichfield Troop on 12 October 1869. He became commanding officer of the regiment with the rank of Lieutenant-Colonel on 29 December 1886.

Levett married Lady Jane Lissey Harriet Feilding, daughter of William Feilding, 7th Earl of Denbigh on 10 January 1856, and they had a son Theophilus Basil Percy Levett, a Justice of the Peace for Staffordshire who married Lady Margaret Emily Ashley-Cooper, daughter of Anthony Ashley-Cooper, 8th Earl of Shaftesbury. Theophilus John Levett was named for his ancestor Theophilus Levett, who had served as Lichfield Town Clerk in the early eighteenth century. A second son of Theophilus Levett and his wife Lady Jane was Berkeley John Talbot Levett, an officer in the Scots Guards. A third child, a daughter, never married.

Theophilus John Levett was a member of London's Carlton Club.

== Notes ==
Parliament of the United Kingdom
Preceded by Richard Dyott	Member of Parliament for Lichfield; 1880–1885	Succeeded by Sir John Swinburne
