= Samuel Sherwin =

American building contractor

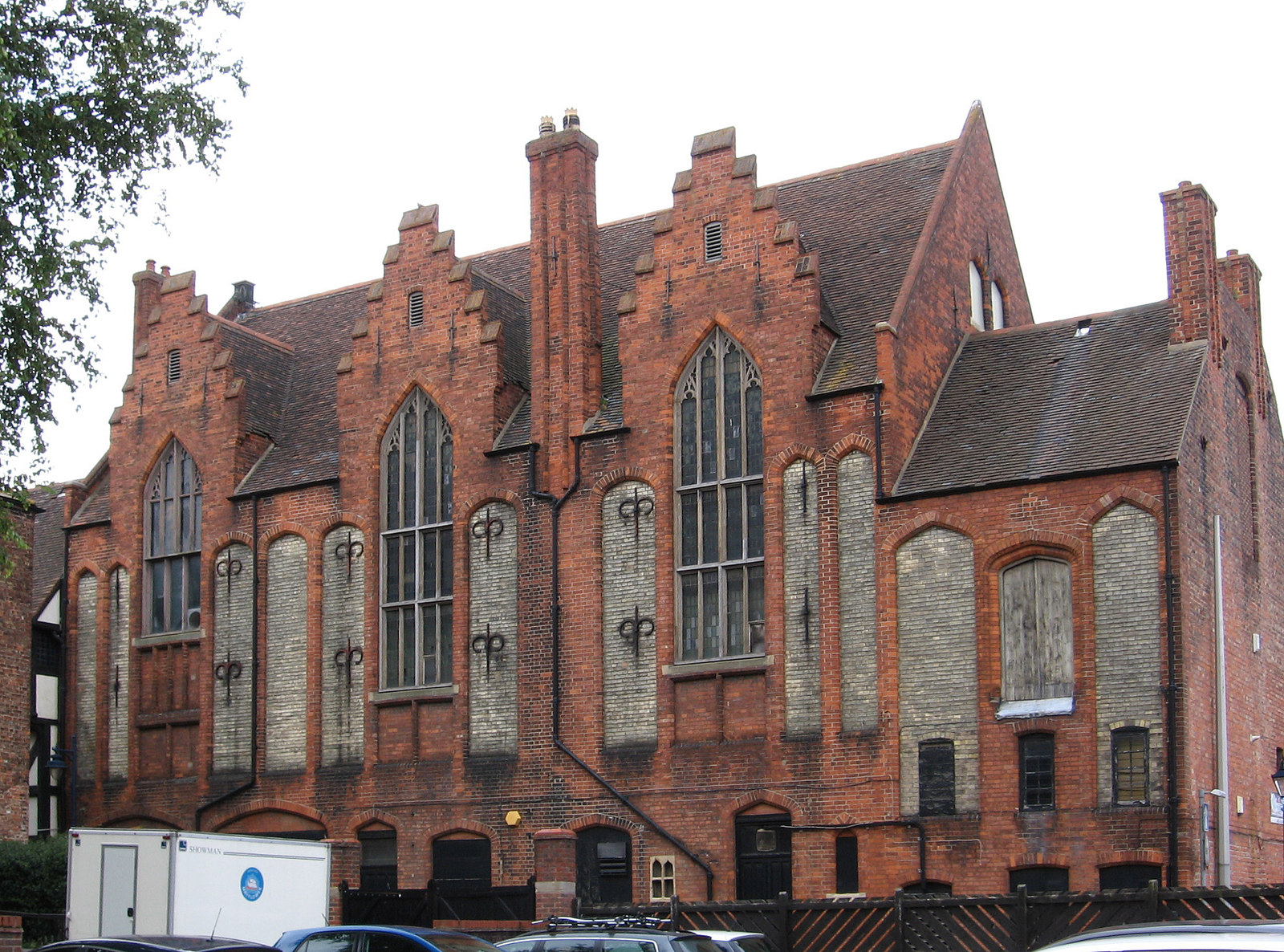
- German Brick Gothic extension to Shodfriars Hall, Boston
- Born: 1813
- Died: 1899 (aged 85–86)
- Occupation: Architect
- Projects: Restoration of the Shodfriars, Boston

Samuel Sherwin (1813–1899) was an architect and building contractor who worked in Boston in Lincolnshire. His father was Dix Sherwin, a ship's chandler. In October 1849, he was apprenticed to William Stainton of Boston, builder, for the term of six years, in the "art or profession of an architect". Sherwin is often referred to as a builder, but the existence of architectural plans signed by him show that he was also a practising architect.

== Architectural work ==
- No15 Market Place Boston (c. 1880). Nationwide Building Society. Originally Small's drapers shop. Described by Pevsner as "commercial Gothic with mullioned and transomed windows, triplets of lancets above in single blind arches and little triplets in the gables". A four-storey building with a brick frontage with stone dressings. Sherwin has ingeniously splayed the corners of the facade to admit more light.

== Work as a building contractor ==
- Shodfriars Hall, Boston. Sherwin acquired this historic medieval building in 1874 and commissioned George Gilbert Scott Jnr. and John Oldrid Scott to advise on the restoration of the building. To the rear of the building a new public hall and Conservative club was built to the Scotts' designs in a German Brick Gothic revival style.
- New Gasworks for the Lincoln Gas Company, Bracebridge (1875). The principal contractors included Samuel Sherwin of Boston, who built the gas holder tanks, processing tanks and retort house.

== Literature ==
- Antram N (revised), Pevsner N & Harris J, (1989), The Buildings of England: Lincolnshire, Yale University Press.
- Minnis J., Carmichael K. & Fletcher C. (2015) Boston, Lincolnshire: Historic North Sea Port and Market Town, English Heritage, ISBN 9781848022706.
