= Augustus Anson =

British Army officer and politician

The Honourable Augustus Anson
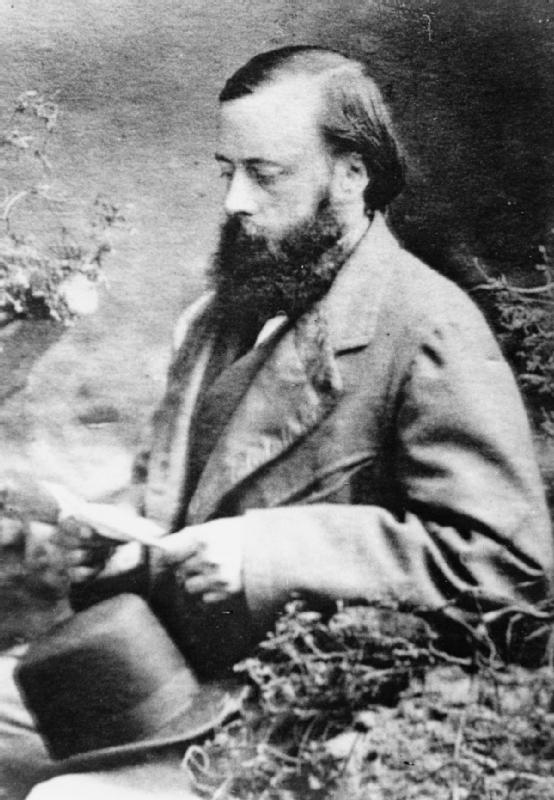
- Born: 5 March 1835; Shugborough Hall, Staffordshire
- Died: 17 November 1877 (aged 42); Cannes, France
- Burial place: Cimetière du Grand Jas, Cannes
- Relatives: Thomas Anson, 1st Earl of Lichfield (father)
- Military career
- Allegiance: United Kingdom
- Branch: British Army
- Service years: Retired 1873
- Rank: Lieutenant-colonel
- Units: 84th Regiment of Foot; 7th Hussars
- Conflicts: Crimean War; Indian Mutiny; Siege of Delhi (WIA); Siege of Lucknow (WIA); Second Anglo-Chinese War
- Awards: Victoria Cross
- Other work: Member of Parliament

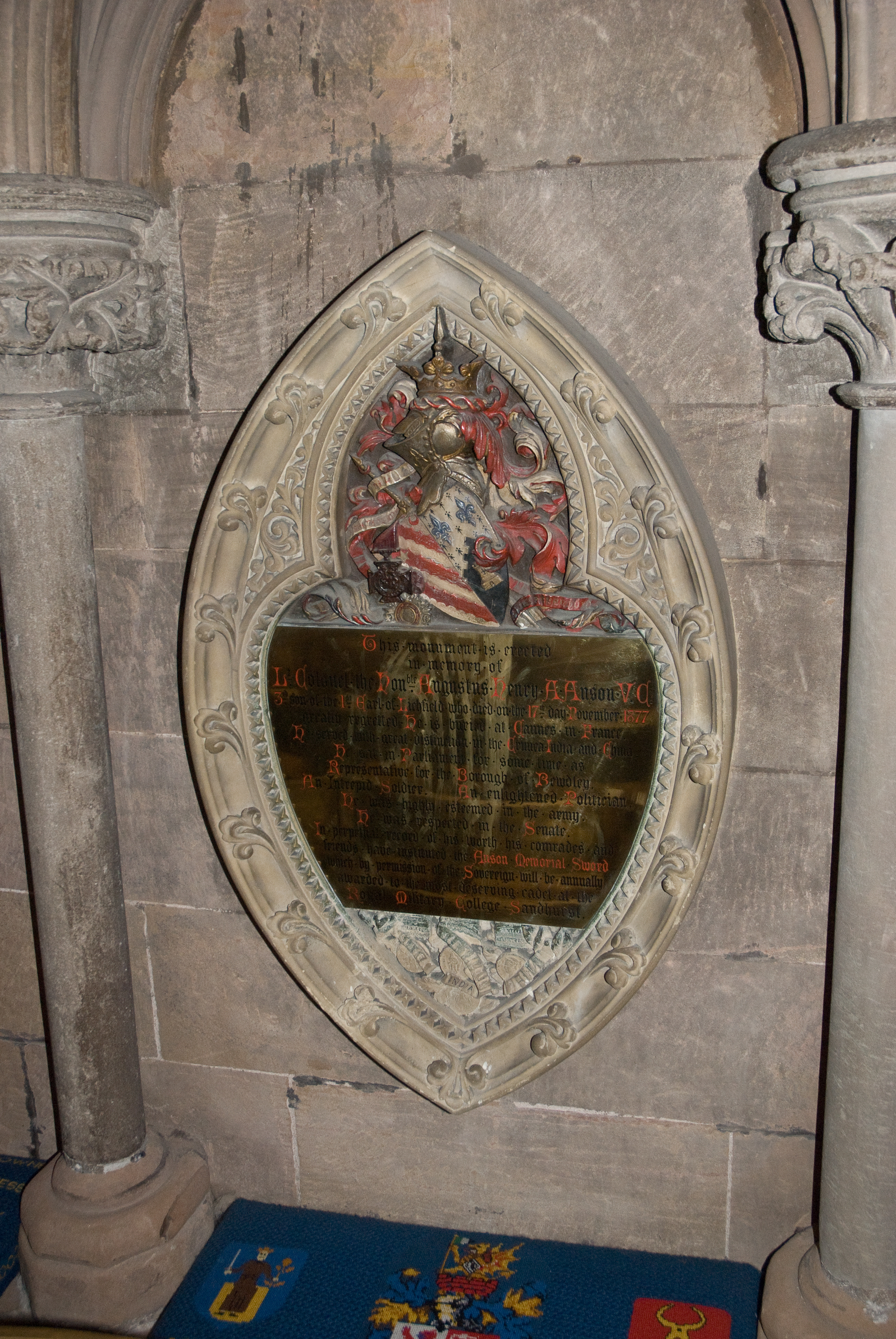
Monument in Lichfield Cathedral

Detail from his monument in Lichfield Cathedral showing arms of Anson impaling Claughton, with crest of Anson above, with his Victoria Cross at left

Lieutenant-Colonel Augustus Henry Archibald Anson VC (5 March 1835 – 17 November 1877) was a member of the Anson family and a recipient of the Victoria Cross, the highest and most prestigious award for gallantry in the face of the enemy that can be awarded to British and Commonwealth forces. He served as Member of Parliament for Lichfield from 1859 until 1868, and for Bewdley from 1869 to 1874.

== Early life and family ==
Anson was born at Shugborough Hall, the third son of Thomas Anson, 1st Earl of Lichfield, by Louisa Catherine Philips, daughter of Nathaniel Philips, of Slebech Hall, Pembrokeshire. Thomas Anson, 2nd Earl of Lichfield and Rev. Adelbert Anson were his brothers.

== Military career ==
=== Crimean War and transfer ===
Anson entered the army at age 18, purchasing a commission as an ensign in the Rifle Brigade. He spent the first part of his career at the regimental depot, where he was promoted to lieutenant. In January 1855, he joined the Rifle Brigades fighting in Crimea. However, following the capture of Sevastopol in September 1855, Anson left active service and was transferred to the 84th Regiment of Foot (later the 2nd Bn, York and Lancaster Regiment), in Burma, to join the staff of his uncle Major-General George Anson, Commander-in-Chief, India. Through this move, he was able to "obtain double pay and double promotion, and to escape all further regimental duty" in Crimea, where the bloody war would continue a further five months.

The circumstances of his transfer, first reported in the Weekly Chronicle of the United Service in March 1856, caused anger among the public, as reflected in a letter to The Times, whose author cast the ultimate blame on Viscount Hardinge, the Commander-in-Chief of the Forces; and Baron Panmure, the Secretary of State for War:

"I do not blame Captain Anson for this act, nor do I blame General Anson for it. They have but acted according to the customs sanctioned by the Horse Guards at home. The real culprits are Lords Hardinge and Panmure. The latter nobleman made his debut as Minister of War in the character of a military reformer, which I fear he will scarcely be able to sustain after the Dowbiggin exposure. (Note: During the Crimean War, Lord Panmure had been embarrassed by the public revelation of a telegraph he sent to Lord Raglan, Commander-in-Chief in the Field in Crimea, about Panmure's favourite nephew, Capt. Dowbiggin. He wrote, "I recommend young Dowbiggin to your attention if he is fit, and you have a vacancy." However, the telegraphist shortened the message so the resulting transmission was merely "Look after Dowb." The phrase "Look after Dowb" quickly became synonymous with "official hints in favour of deserving nephews.") We have seen him at the very moment when England was mourning Lord Raglan's loss-when hundreds of British parents were weeping for their children whose lives had been uselessly wasted on the glacis of the Redan—when our statesmen, perplexed where to look for military talent, had at last doubtfully decided on General Simpson as a temporary stop-gap—we have seen Lord Panmure, I say, at such a moment, in the midst of England's perplexity and sorrow, availing himself of the very despatch in which he had announced to the overtasked old General the high position which had been forced upon him in order to obtain for his nephew [Capt. Dowbiggin] the promotion which he feared he could not obtain on his own merits; and, I am sorry to say, we have heard the Premier of England declare in Parliament that he thought the content of that despatch redounded to Lord Pamure's honour!"

=== Indian Mutiny ===
At 22 years old and a captain in the 84th Regiment during the Indian Mutiny, when the following deeds took place on 28 September 1857 at Bolandshahr and at Lucknow, on 16 November 1857, for which he was awarded the VC. Despatch from Major-General Sir James Hope Grant, dated 12 August 1858:

For conspicuous bravery at Bolundshahur, on the 28th September, 1857. The 9th Light Dragoons had charged through the town, and were reforming in the Serai; the enemy attempted to close the entrance by drawing their carts across it, so as to shut in the cavalry and form a cover from which to fire upon them. Captain Anson, taking a lance, dashed out of the gateway, and knocked the drivers off their carts. Owing to a wound in his left hand, received at Delhi, he could not stop his horse, and rode into the middle of the enemy, who fired a volley at him, one ball passing through his coat. At Lucknow, at the assault of the Secundra Bagh, on 16th November, 1857, he entered with the storming party on the gates being burst open. He had his horse killed, and was himself slightly wounded. He has shown the greatest gallantry on every occasion, and has slain many enemies in fight.

Anson later achieved the rank of lieutenant colonel.

== Political career ==
In 1859, he was elected Member of Parliament for Lichfield as a Liberal, holding the seat until 1868. Although losing the by-election in 1869 for Bewdley the election was overturned on petition and the seat was awarded to him. He won the subsequent election and remained in parliament until 1874.

In 1870, he was one of two directors of The Land and Sea Telegraph Construction Company Ltd. as it applied to be wound up, the other being William Palliser. Anson was then "of Dudley House, Park-lane, in the county of Middlesex".

== Personal life ==
On his return to England, he married Amelia Claughton, a daughter of Rev. Thomas Legh Claughton, the future first Bishop of St Albans.

Anson died at the age of 42 in Cannes, France, and was buried there. There is a memorial plaque to him in Lichfield Cathedral.

== Works ==
- The supersession of the colonels of the Royal Army (1873)

== Notes ==
Parliament of the United Kingdom
Preceded by Viscount Sandon and Lord Alfred Paget	Member of Parliament for Lichfield; 1859–1868; With: Lord Alfred Paget to 1865; Richard Dyott from 1865	Succeeded by Richard Dyott
Preceded by John Pickersgill-Cunliffe	Member of Parliament for Bewdley; 1869–1874	Succeeded by Charles Harrison
