= Winnington (disambiguation) =

Winnington is an area of Northwich, Cheshire, England.

Winnington may also refer to:

== Places in England ==
- Winnington, a former name of Wymington, Bedfordshire, a village
- Winnington, Shropshire, a hamlet in the former parish of Wollaston
- Winnington, Staffordshire, a hamlet

== People ==
- Winnington baronets
- Alan Winnington
- John Winnington
- Thomas Winnington (disambiguation)
- Francis Winnington (disambiguation)
- Edward Winnington (disambiguation)
