= William Hopkins (Bewdley MP) =

English politician

William Hopkins (died 19 July 1647) was an English politician who won election to the House of Commons in 1647.

Hopkins was described as "the most eminent and truly religious magistrate of Bewdley" and a "gracious and able Christian". In 1647, he was elected Member of Parliament for Bewdley in a double return. The election was declared void and he died before the by-election.

Hopkins was buried at Ribbesford on 21 July 1647.

Hopkins married Helen Vickaris on 30 October 1609.

Parliament of England
Preceded by Sir Henry Herbert	Member of Parliament for Bewdley; 1647	Succeeded by Nicholas Lechmere
