= Elmley Lovett =

Civil parish in Worcestershire, England

Coordinates: 52.32°N 2.19°W

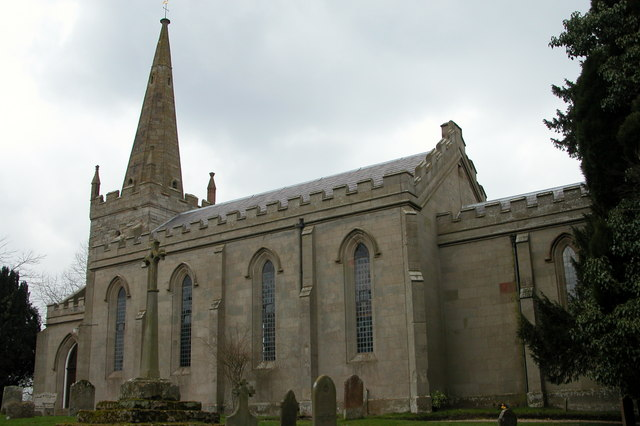
- St Michael's church is a grand and medievalesque reconstruction of a much earlier church, such as its centuries-old spire

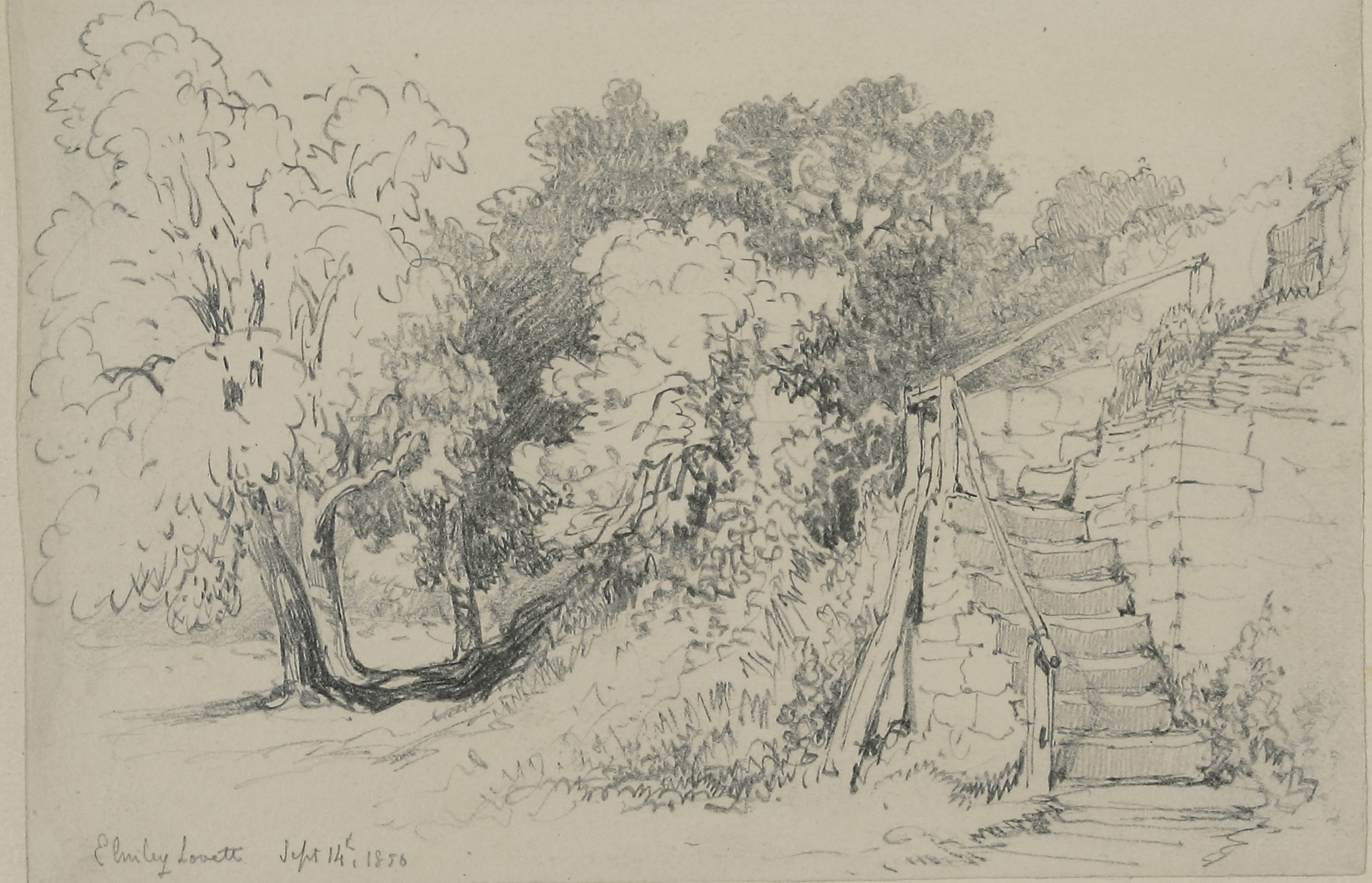
- Steps and trees at Elmley Lovett, sketched in 1850

- Location within Worcestershire
- Area: 7.82 km^{2} (3.02 sq mi)
- Population: 334 (2021 census)
  - Density: 43/km^{2} (110/sq mi)
- Civil parish: Elmbridge
- District: Wychavon
- Shire county: Worcestershire
- Region: West Midlands
- Country: England
- Sovereign state: United Kingdom
- Post town: Droitwich
- Postcode district: WR9
- UK Parliament: Mid Worcestershire

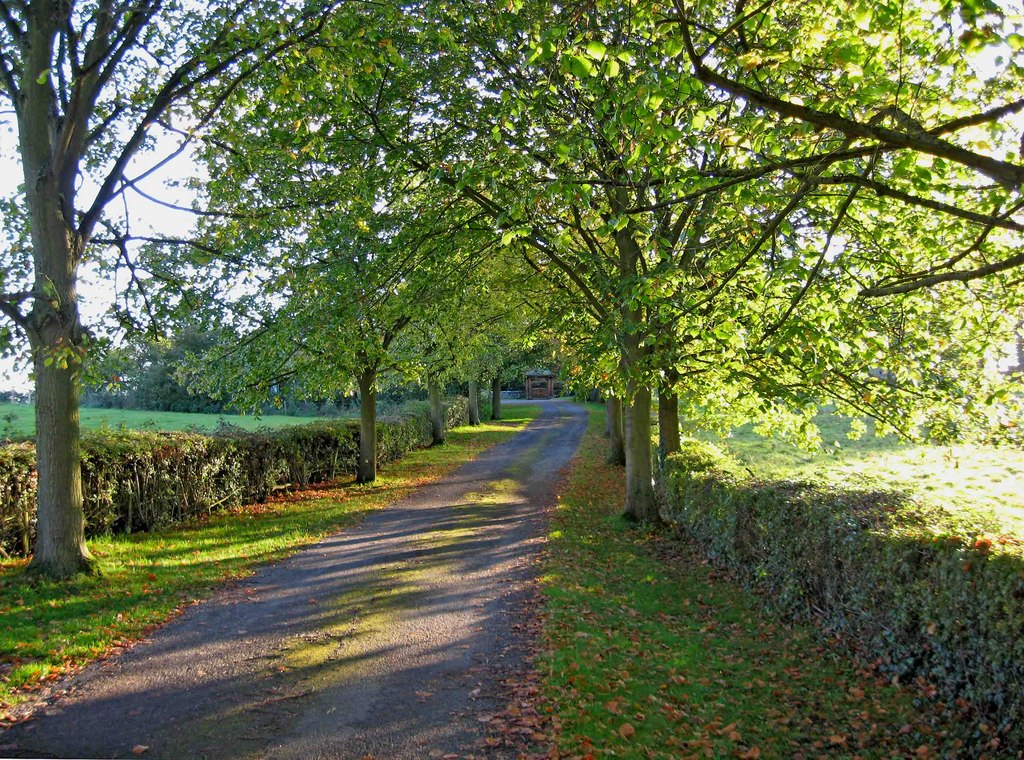
Tree-lined drive to St Michael's Church

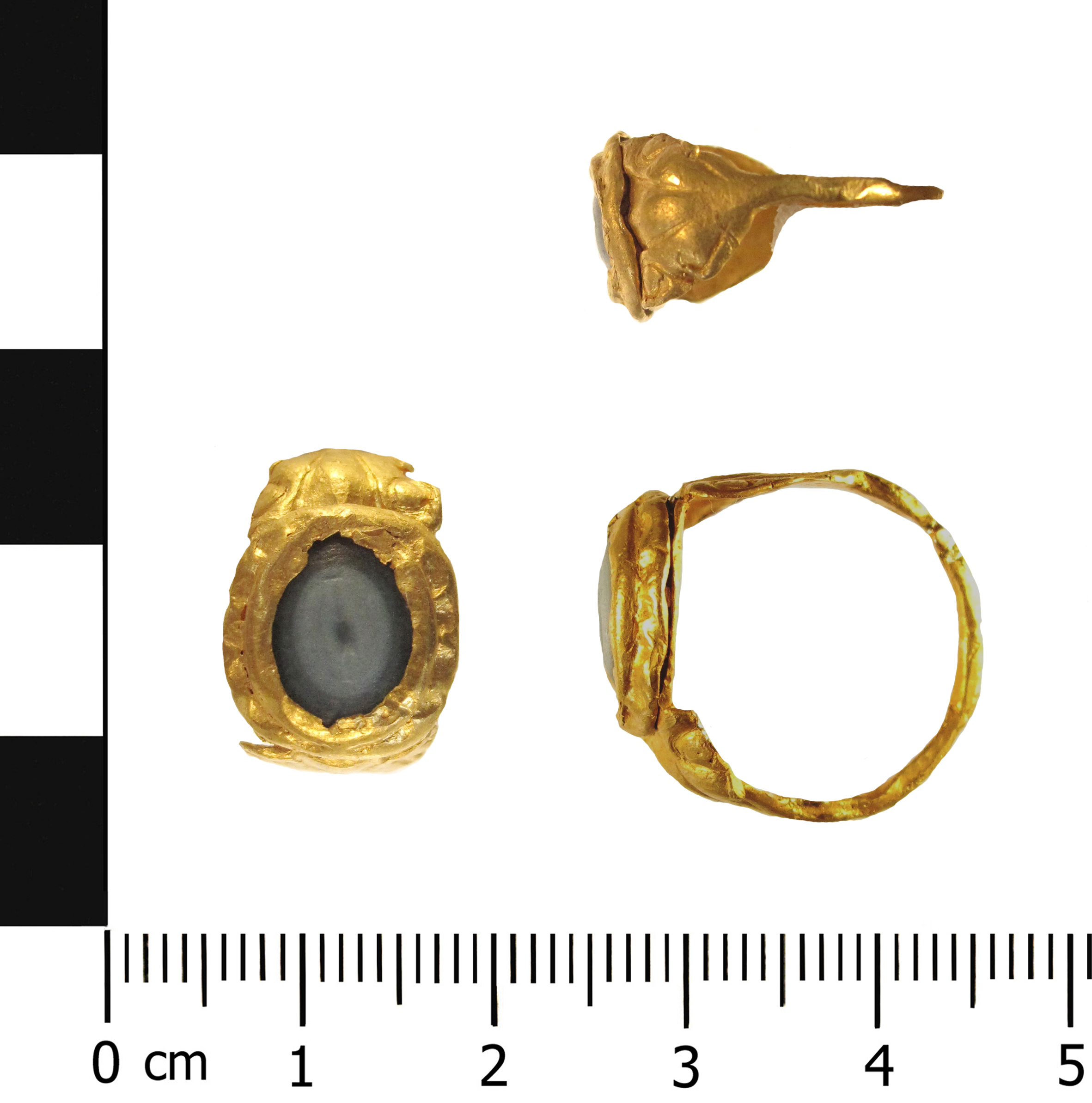
Roman finger-ring Elmley Lovett third century AD

Elmley Lovett in Worcestershire, England is a civil parish whose residents' homes are quite loosely clustered east of its Hartlebury Trading Estate, as well as in minor neighbourhood Cutnall Green to the near south-east. The latter is a loosely linear settlement that includes a pub-restaurant and farm shop on the Elmley Lovett side of the boundaries; it continues passing its near-square public green into the parish of Elmbridge, a similarly sized parish over to the east.

The village is 5 miles (8 km) NNW of Droitwich, but Cutnall Green is closer to 4 miles. Coastal climate prevails in the area. The average annual temperature is 8 °C. The warmest month is July, when the average temperature is 17 °C, and the coldest is December, with 0 °C.

The name of the parish means "clearing of the elm trees", and the family name "Lovett" appears to have been added in the thirteenth century following landowner intermarriage by the Lovett family.

A rare snowdrop has been named after Elmley Lovett, Galanthus elwesii 'Elmley Lovett' (popularly: Galanthus Elmley Lovett).

The village has traceable historical roots and many scheduled historical remains.

== St Michael's Church ==
The old stone parish church, much restored, has four very tall lancet windows to each side of the nave and a modest bell tower topped by a tall stone spire. It is flanked by a scattering of tall trees. The mediaeval Church of St Michael was renovated by way of extensive rebuilding in 1840. The church continues to contain some 14th and 15th century traces. Neither the church nor its cemetery are covered by the Historic England listing. Parish registers begin in 1539. This church has a dedicated lychgate dating to 1924, and a kissing gate in its grounds.

Between 1908 and 1925 the rector was distinguished retired missionary and Japanese language expert the Rt Rev Philip Fyson.

== History ==
=== Early history ===
Elmley Lovett is the site of a find of a Roman coin hoard. This find comprises six Roman denarii dating from the period 115 BC-37 AD. One of them is a rare Roman Republican silver denarius of Brutus with Casca Longus and was struck at a mint moving with Brutus 43-42 BC. A Roman gold finger-ring was also found in Elmley Lovett. It dates to 200 AD- 300 AD (third century AD).

In the Domesday Book, Elmley Lovett is recorded as in Worcestershire in the Hundred of Cresslow and as having 30 households in 1086. The area was also surrounded by woods in 1086 and was close to forests such as Kinver, Feckenham, Cannock and Arden. In 1086 the three watermills at Elmley Lovett were on the River Salwarpe system. A full history of the ownership of the tenancy in chief and also of the lordship of the manor for Elmley Lovett can be traced.

Historic England information details the official listing information as to the settlement, some of which is said to originate in legacy data systems. It provides detailed best information as to the documentation and remnant status of the areas around the village church and includes the mediaeval remains. The settlement at Elmley Lovett is stated to be first recorded from the 9th century. By 1086 it had a priest, ten plough teams, three mills and a large area of wood. This area of habitation was contained within the Forest of Ombersley until approximately 1230. The manor was ultimately sold by the Crown to Sir Robert Acton in 1543, who at that date was a Justice of the Peace and former High Sheriff of Worcestershire. Acton directed in his will that his body should be buried in Elmley Lovett. The will is dated 24 September 1558 and names prominent executors. Acton died within a matter of days. In the 17th century an avenue of trees was planted across the mediaeval village remnants. In 1635 a new manor house was created and this may coincide with the abandonment of the earlier moated house on the mediaeval site. The new house was south of the church, and it survived until 1890 when it was demolished. Remains of it are a partly walled enclosure and the remants of a 17th century dovecote.

=== History 1600 onwards ===
Elmley Lovett features in seventeenth-century records, in particular illustrating the system of tax assessment, subsidy raising and impressment of men for military service. In 1621 the manor was divided between the four daughters of Sir John Acton (the grandson of Sir Robert Acton). Elizabeth, one of these daughters, married the diarist Henry Townshend, who bought out the other daughters. Both she and her husband were descendants of Sir Robert Townshend (judge and Chief Justice of the Marches of Wales and Chester). The diary (1640-1663) of Henry Townshend of Elmsley Lovett is a key historic document of the seventeenth century. It was commissioned by the Worcester Historical Society to be edited by American scholar John W Willis Bund, printed in 1920 by Mitchell Hughes and Clarke of London EC4. Henry Townshend was a civil war royalist.

His diary/annals effectively begin in 1640 with the conscription of soldiers in the army to be posted to Scotland. Elmley Lovett is one of the parishes recorded as contributing to this effort. John Radford, High Collector of Kidderminster, gentleman, in his document of The Assessment of the Hundred of Halfshire dated 28 April 1629 (5th Caroli R) records a subsidy due in 1629, and then later entries show the subsidies raised in 1641 and 1642. These figures represent a significant increase in the assessments for the parish of Elmley Lovett as follows. In 1629 Elmley Lovett is recorded as requiring to pay £7 12 shillings and sixpence. The two later subsidies were gathered by Robert Kimberley of Bromsgrove in the sums of £9 twelve shillings in 1641, and in the following year the same sum was raised in two instalments of £9 8 shillings and, separately, 4 shillings.

Thomas Wentworth, 1st Earl of Strafford, in 1640 advised the raising and equipping of a royal army to be sent to Scotland. Elmley Lovett's constable, William Penn of Harborough, was summoned to raise the money and by warrant of 28 April 1640 wrote to each of the parishioners demanding that a parish payment of £7 10 shillings be delivered to him at his house on the 7th of May. This was their share of the £1,200 to be raised. On 22 April 1640, three men were pressed to join the army. They were Henry Powell, Richard Crow (a mason) and Rowland Edwards (a tailor). A man called Christopher Stutty had his name struck off the list. It seems possible that his name was removed because the other men were fitter. The inhabitants of Elmley Lovett had been assessed on 24 March 1640 for a double subsidy totalling £9 12 shillings. 19 residents are assessed in land or goods. Henry Townshend himself is the highest assessment at £4 in land, followed by Thomas Tyner at £3 in goods. Two widows are assessed. Three recusants, Humphrey Cook, Elizabeth Cook and Alice Cooke were assessed at zero value but were required to pay 8 pence each.

In January 1642 a further demand for £10 8 shillings and three pence was imposed on Elmley Lovett, this time the assessments being on 52 people, including 3 widows. The rector of the church, Mr Edward Best, is assessed, alongside his cleric Richard Wollaston. In August 1644, parishes were assigned to support troops, and Elmley Lovett was required to support Captain William Sandys at the Hartlebury Garrison and his 100 men to the extent of £11 4 shillings. By October 1645 Evesham was the Headquarters of the Parliamentary army, which demanded on 14 October that Elmley Lovett support it to the extent of £10 monthly said to be in arrear and unpaid. If not paid within 3 days, the parish was threatened with "pillaging, and plundering, and your houses fired, and your persons imprisoned". In 1649 a statutory subsidy was to be raised in the sum of £400,000. Of this, Elmley Lovett's share was £20.

The Moule family of Snead's Green House were among the most prominent local landowners from the 1620s until the late nineteenth century, when the family died out in the male line.

=== History 1800 onwards ===
The Elmley Lovett Volunteers were a regiment of Worcestershire soldiers formed to fight against the Emperor Napoleon. The Elmley Lovett Infantry served under Captain S. T. Forrester and in 1808 numbered 66 persons. A metal button bearing a crown and the letters ELV has been found.

A study of the labouring class in the period 1790-1841 concluded that Elmley Lovett was a relatively prosperous parish but that the overseers of the poor took a harsh attitude in the 1820s to possible claimants for relief. It also records that, though Elmley Lovett's two fee-paying schools were technically available to the labouring class, the schools were badly supplied, poorly taught, cold and grim. In 1816 the overseers' accounts for the Elmley Lovett parish for 1815 and 1815 were sought to be challenged, but the challenge was brought too late and the three judges of the Court of King's Bench unanimously refused to entertain it.

In June 1829 a major lawsuit took place between the rector of the parish, the Rev Lynes, as plaintiff (claimant) and a tithe-paying parishioner, Mr Lett. The rector successfully relied on a terrier of 1714. This was a document produced for the bishopric describing the rector's tithe entitlements. The dispute concerned whether the tithes for colts, calves, pears, milk and wintered ewes were to be strictly rendered as provided by the terrier.

In 1868 the parish is described as neighbouring the hamlets of Bellington and Snead's Green. The rectory is considered to have a value of £527 annually, and to be in the gift of Christ's College, Cambridge. All of the church, excepting the early spire, had by then been rebuilt. The church possessed 6 bells. The Rev William Orme Foster is described as lord of the manor. The enclosure of land around Elmley Lovett is mapped and certified as accurate as at 29 January 1874 by surveyor Albert Buck of St Nicholas, Worcester. The entry relates to 137 acres of enclosed land including water and other features. In 1879 the rectory is described as valued at £552 and to include 28 acres of glebe land. The rector since 1837 had been the Rev Henry Perceval, M.A., formerly of Brasenose College, Oxford.

On the north wall of St Michael's church there is a war memorial to the First World War (1914-1918).

During the Second World War (1939–45), Elmley Lovett hosted the worship of the Royal Air Force personnel from RAF Hartlebury. A brass memorial plaque was presented to St Michael's Church, as well as an RAF ensign, to honour the link.

=== Deserted medieval village ===
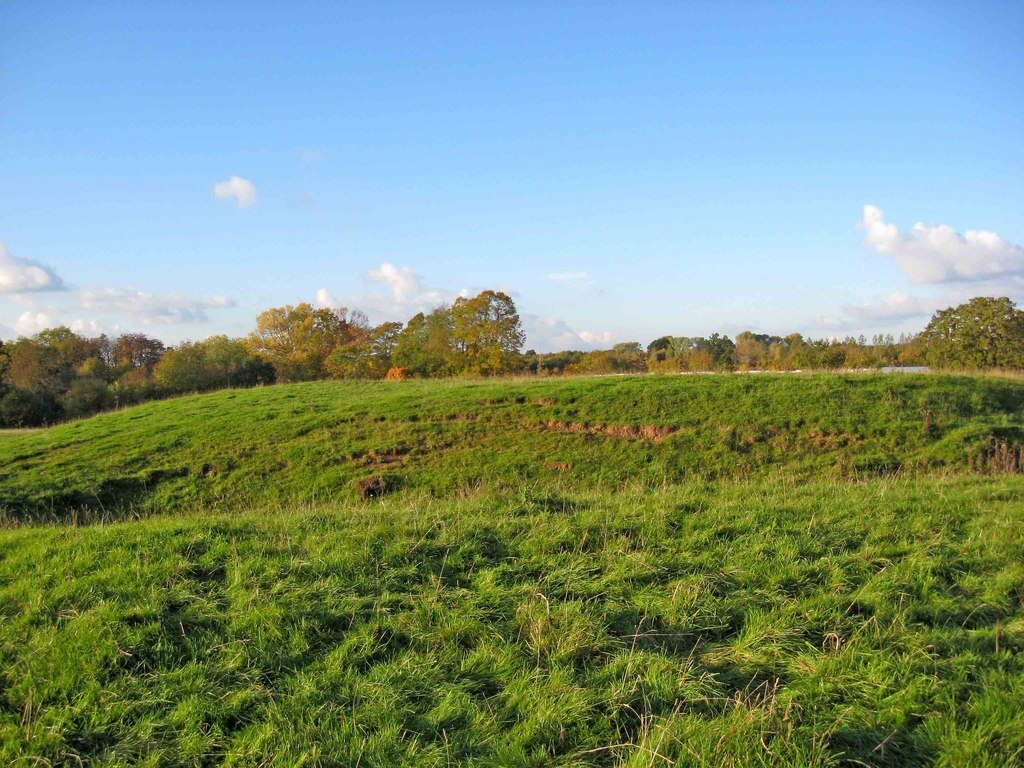
Earthworks of the medieval village

Around St Michael's churchyard are the remains of a deserted medieval village. (It is a scheduled monument.) The abandonment may have been due to the migration of the inhabitants to Cutnall Green; the period when this may have happened is not known.

The remains of a moated manor house lie near the church: there is a circular platform, diameter about 50 metres (160 ft), within a moat up to 2.5 metres (8 ft 2 in) deep, now dry. 200 metres (660 ft) south of the church are the remains of the walls of a half-timbered mansion, built in 1635 and demolished in 1890, which may have originally replaced the moated manor house.

To the south and west of the church are banks and ditches, remains of up to four houses with associated yards and garden plots. South of these are irregular enclosures that were stock pens or were used for cultivation. There are at least three trackways, running from the present-day lane, eastwards across the earthworks towards the moated site and church.

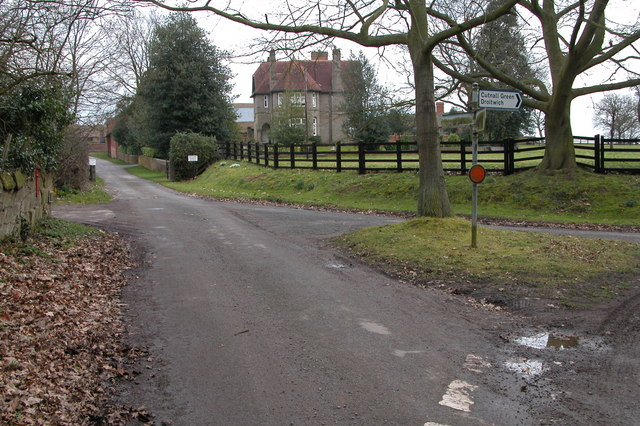
Public junction and approach to a more elaborate than usual farmhouse - the area is archetypically lined with trees.

=== Heritage Listings ===
There are in Elmley Lovett (including Sneads Green) 20 separate Heritage listings or scheduled listings entered with Historic England. These are as follows: Churchyard Cross 10 metres south of the nave of the Church of St Michael; Aaron memorial 15 metres SE of the chancel of the Church of St Michael; dovecote 10 metres SE of the Old Rectory; Stone House; The Old Rectory; the Church of St Michael (Grade II*); house 50 metres East of the Church; Cow House 25 metres NW of Lake Farmhouse; Swallow Cottage; gate and gateposts 30 metres South of Moat House; barn 50 metres North of Lake Farmhouse; Walton Cottages 1 & 2 Pye Hill; Sneadgreen House, Sneads Green; Caloow Cottage, Sneads Green; outhouse 10 metres South of Holly Orchard, Sneads Green; Green End Cottage, Sneads Green; Newhouse Farmhouse; Moat House; mediaeval remains; St Michael's Churchyard.
