= Henry Herbert, 1st Baron Herbert of Chirbury =

English politician

Henry Herbert, 1st Baron Herbert of Chirbury (24 July 1654 – 22 January 1709) was an English politician who sat in the House of Commons at various times between 1677 and 1694 when he became Baron Herbert of Chirbury.

Herbert was the son of Sir Henry Herbert, Master of Revels to Charles I and Charles II. He inherited the manor of Ribbesford (near Bewdley) on the death of his father. Like his father he served as Member of Parliament for Bewdley, from 1677 to 1679, for Worcester in Charles II's last Parliament and again for Bewdley from 1689 to 1694. In the latter year, the title Baron Herbert of Chirbury, which had become extinct on the death of his cousin Henry Herbert, 4th Baron Herbert of Chirbury in 1691, was revived for him. In 1697 he was Captain of a Troop of Horse in the Worcestershire Militia.

He was involved in the passage of the Act for better Securing the Duties of East India Goods, which extended the monopoly of the London-based East India Company across Scotland thus encompassing the whole of the new Kingdom of Great Britain.

== Notes ==
Parliament of England
Preceded by Thomas Foley	Member of Parliament for Bewdley; 1677–1679	Succeeded by Philip Foley
Preceded by Thomas Street; Sir Francis Winnington	Member of Parliament for Worcester; 1681–1685; With: Sir Francis Winnington	Succeeded by William Bromley; Bridges Nanfan
Preceded by Sir Charles Lyttelton, 3rd Baronet	Member of Parliament for Bewdley; 1689–1694	Succeeded by Salwey Winnington
Honorary titles
Preceded by The Earl of Macclesfield	Custos Rotulorum of Brecknockshire; 1695–1702	Succeeded by The Lord Ashburnham
Peerage of England
New creation	Baron Herbert of Chirbury; 1694–1709	Succeeded by Henry Herbert
