= Henry Herbert (Master of the Revels) =

English MP and Master of the Revels (1594–1673)

Sir Henry Herbert
- Born: 1594
- Died: 27 April 1673 (aged 78–79)
- Occupation: master of revels
- Known for: theatrical censor in England from 1623–1641 and again from 1660–1673

Sir Henry Herbert (baptized 7 July 1594 – 27 April 1673) was Master of the Revels to both King Charles I and King Charles II, as well as a politician during both reigns.

== Biography ==
Baptised in July 1594, Herbert was the sixth son of Magdalen Herbert and Richard Herbert of Montgomery Castle. Henry was a younger brother of Edward Herbert, 1st Baron Herbert of Cherbury and the poet George Herbert, both former members of the Parliament of England, and older brother of naval officer Thomas Herbert. Their family was related to the Herbert Earls of Pembroke, prominent figures in English government and society throughout the Jacobean and Caroline era. Edward Herbert was ambassador in Paris, and Henry joined him in 1619 and became involved in the case of Piero Hugon and the jewels of Anne of Denmark.

Herbert's role as Master of the Revels involved reading and licensing plays and supervising all kinds of public entertainment. Officially, Herbert became Master of the Revels in 1641 but he had been doing the work of the office even earlier. Sir John Astley, the official Master from 1622 to his death in January 1640, had appointed Herbert his deputy the year that he was knighted in 1623. For this arrangement Herbert paid Astley £150 per year in return for the income that the office provided.

== Censor ==
Since Herbert was responsible for licensing and also censoring plays, he had a powerful influence on English drama for two decades, 1623–1642. Herbert had barely gained the official position of Master in 1641 when the theatres were closed at the start of the English Civil War in August 1642. Herbert retained the office throughout the time it was dormant, down to the re-opening of the theatres at the Restoration in 1660. When Charles II allowed Thomas Killigrew and Sir William Davenant to form two theatre companies under royal patronage, the King's Company and the Duke's Company, in August 1660, Herbert complained bitterly at what he perceived as the violation of his rights, and started court actions; he was especially irate with Davenant, who had carried on clandestine theatrical performances in the 1656–1660 period, without Herbert benefitting. Over the next two years, Herbert's claims were adjusted and the two royal companies had their privileges renewed by royal patent in 1662. Afterward, he was no longer the power in the theatre that he had been before.

== Other positions ==
Charles I gave the manor of Ribbesford (in whose parish the Borough of Bewdley lies) to his brothers in 1627 and they passed it to Herbert. He was the Member of Parliament for Montgomery Boroughs in 1626 and Bewdley in 1640 (in both the Short and the Long parliaments), but was disabled from sitting by resolution of the Commons in 1642 because he put into execution the king's commission of array. In 1646 at the end of the First Civil War he was considered a Royalist delinquent by the Parliamentarians and his estate was compounded.

After the Restoration in 1660, Herbert again sat for Bewdley (in the Cavalier Parliament) and held the seat until his death. He was a Justice of the Peace for Worcestershire by 1636 to 1646 and from July 1660 to his death. He was appointed High Sheriff of Worcestershire for 1648–1649 and was also a member of the Council of the Marches of Wales for 1633–?1646.

Herbert died on 27 April 1673 and was buried at St Paul's, Covent Garden.

== Family and posterity ==
Herbert was twice married. He married firstly, in July 1625, Susanna daughter of Richard Sleford, a London clothworker, and widow of Edward Plumer, merchant tailor of London. By her he had one son who died in his father's lifetime, and two daughters. Lady Susanna Herbert died in 1650.

Herbert married secondly, in 1650/51, Elizabeth, daughter of Sir Robert Offley of London and Oadby, Leicestershire. By her he had three sons (one of whom died in his father's lifetime) and five daughters. Lady Elizabeth Herbert survived him and died in 1698.

Herbert was succeeded by Henry, his son from his second marriage, for whom the barony of Cherbury was revived. Both he and his son served as Members of Parliament for Bewdley. Henry died in January 1709, and his son, another Henry, became 2nd Lord Herbert of Cherbury of the second creation. He died without issue in April 1738, and again the barony became extinct. In 1743 it was revived for Henry Arthur Herbert (c. 1703–1772), who five years later was created Earl of Powis. This nobleman was a great-grandson of the 2nd Lord Herbert of Cherbury of the first creation, and since his time the barony has been held by the Earls of Powis. However the Ribbesford estate passed to his cousin Charles Morley, who took the surname Herbert.

== Office-book ==
The surviving transcripts of Herbert's "office-book" are among the most important documentary records of English Renaissance drama. Herbert recorded all of his activities as Master of the Revels, in particular his licensing of plays for performance and his organization of court performances. His detailed records provide modern scholars with dates for many plays of the period, as well as dates of performances at court, and evidence for the existence of lost plays. The office-book itself has been lost since 1818, but its information partially survives in incomplete eighteenth- and nineteenth-century transcripts.

When Herbert died in 1673, his papers, including the office-book, were stored at his home, the manor-house of Ribbesford, Worcestershire. In 1738, Herbert's grandson, Henry Herbert, 2nd Baron Herbert of Chirbury died childless and the archive was bequeathed to another relative, Francis Walker, and was gradually dispersed over time. However, the office-book and other documents related to it were overlooked, remaining at Ribbesford in an old wooden chest where they were partially damaged by water leakage. In 1787, Ribbesford House was sold to Francis Ingram who discovered the chest and its contents.

In the next few decades, Ingram and his descendants permitted scholars to study the revels documents. The most important was Edmond Malone, who found the office-book to be partially moldered, but still readable. He published selections from it in his edition of Shakespeare (1790). Malone claimed to have made a full transcript of the office-book, but he only published a fraction of it, and his transcript has never been found. At some point, the scholar Craven Ord studied the office-book and transcribed a large number of entries from it but did not publish them. In the 1790s, George Chalmers published some extracts not published by Malone in 1799; however, although he did not acknowledge it, these may have been supplied to Chalmers by Ord. At some point before 1818, Thomas Ingram temporarily loaned the office-book to Reverend Richard Warner and his sister Rebecca Warner, and they published some extracts from it.

When Craven Ord died, his transcripts of the office-book were auctioned and ultimately ended up in the hands of Jacob Henry Burn, who was compiling notes toward a history of the Office of the Revels. Burn copied, or sometimes cut out and pasted, some of Ord's records into his own notebook, which is now in the Beinecke Library. After his death, the Ord transcript was bought by J.O. Halliwell-Phillips, who also did not publish anything from it. The Ord transcript appeared to be lost until 1937, when R.C. Bald discovered fragments of it pasted into Halliwell-Phillips' notebooks, stored at the Folger Shakespeare Library. It was revealed that Halliwell-Philips had gone through the Ord transcript and cut out interesting items, apparently discarding the rest. In 1996, N.W. Bawcutt discovered a few more of Hallilwell-Phillips' cuttings in a notebook at Edinburgh University Library.

After 1818, the original office-book appears to have been lost. It was in the possession of Reverend Edward Winnington-Ingram, but it is not known what he did with it and it is no longer in the family's papers. Halliwell-Phillips asserted that it was in the library of the Earl of Powis, but the Earl denied this; the Powis papers are now owned by the Public Record Office and the National Library of Wales and the office-book is not among them. N.W. Bawcutt, who published in 1996 a complete collection of all of the surviving Revels records, believes that the lost information might still be rediscovered some day: the office-book, Malone's transcript, the remains of Ord's transcript, and Chalmers' notebooks are all unaccounted for and might still come to light.

Court offices
Preceded by John Astley	Master of the Revels; 1640–1673 acting from 1623	Succeeded by Thomas Killigrew
Parliament of England
Preceded by George Herbert	Member of Parliament for Montgomery; 1626	Succeeded by Sir Richard Lloyd
Preceded by Ralph Clare	Member of Parliament for Bewdley; 1640–1642	Vacant Title next held by Nicholas Lechmere, from 1648
Preceded by Thomas Foley	Member of Parliament for Bewdley; 1661–1673	Succeeded by Thomas Foley
