= Robert Acton =

16th-century English politician

Sir Robert Acton (by 1497 – 28/29 September 1558), of Elmley Lovett and Ribbesford, Worcestershire and Southwark, Surrey, was an English politician.

He was the second son of Richard Acton of Sutton, Worcestershire. He was knighted before 5 September 1543.

== Career ==
He entered court as a Groom of the Chamber in 1518, became a page in 1526, a Gentleman Usher in 1528 and an Esquire of the Body in 1539. He was appointed Constable of Haverfordwest Castle, Pembrokeshire by 1532-52 or later. In 1536 he was called to serve against rebels in the north of England, in 1540 he attended the reception of Anne of Cleves and in 1544 he fought in the French campaign. "He succeeded his father-in-law as King’s saddler, and inherited half his goods and all his lands". In October 1532 Acton went with Henry VIII to Calais, fell ill there, and wrote to Cromwell for permission no to be present at the session of Parliament. In 1534 Acton was back in the House, his name was in a list of Members drawn up by Cromwell.

He was appointed for life as a Justice of the Peace to the benches of Worcestershire in 1537 and Surrey in 1538. He served as High Sheriff of Worcestershire for 1538–39 and 1545–46 and High Sheriff of Montgomeryshire for 1541–42 and 1548–49 and was elected a Member of Parliament for Southwark in 1529, 1539 and 1542. He was a member of the Council of the Marches of Wales in 1551. And he probably also been re-elected to the Parliament of 1536, in accordance with the King's general request for the return of the previous Members. After Henry VIII's death Acton remained on the commission of the peace but didn't take much part in public affairs.

== Private life ==
He married Margery, the daughter and heiress of Nicholas Mayor of Southwark, with whom he had 2 sons and a daughter. Acton's wife brought with her to the marriage £68 a year in lands, £700 in cash, £333 in plate, a furnished house worth some £130, and £333 in debts due. Lady Acton sued her husband in the Court of Requests, complaining that between 1548 and 1553 he had spent nothing on her maintenance bar a £27 credit for some of her lands sold. The court awarded her £30 a year for life. Following this estrangement, Acton sold his wife's inheritance lands and property without any compensation to her. Instead, he left everything entailed (tied to the male line of descent) to his sons. This was restated in his will (which directed he be buried in Elmley Lovett) dated 24 September 1558. He died 4 or 5 days later, expressing himself in the will to be Protestant, but with two of his Executors being the distinguished and prominent Roman Catholics Cardinal Reginald Pole and Bishop Richard Pate of Worcester. He acquired substantial property, including Ribbesford House in Worcestershire, Wormington Grange in Gloucestershire and the manor of Elmley Lovett in Worcestershire, which passed on his death to his sons.
