= Francis Ingram =

English slave trader

Francis Ingram (1739–1815) was an English slave trader and privateer.

Ingram was responsible for at least 108 slave voyages, carrying around 34,000 enslaved people, of whom around 5,000 died on his ships. He was a member of the African Company of Merchants. In 1778, the Anglo-French War began and the UK slave trade was disrupted. In response he became a privateer. He was part owner of a ship called Enterprise that captured a number of vessels.

== Early life ==
Ingram was born in Oulton, near Wakefield, Yorkshire in 1739.

== Slave trade ==
Francis Ingram was responsible for at least 108 slave voyages. He bought around 34,000 enslaved people, of these around 5,000 died in transit. He had a career lasting 39 years, a time span exceeded by only three other Liverpool slave traders.

Ingram pioneered the British slave trade at Porto-Novo in the Bight of Benin, in the 1780s fewer than 200 enslaved people were bought each year from the township, but by the 1790s this number had increased to more than 3,000.

Ingram delivered between 40 and 50 per cent of his enslaved people to Jamaica. The island was the biggest market for the Liverpool slave trade and it developed an advanced merchant support trade that reduced fees and transaction costs.

== Privateer ==
In 1778, the Anglo-French War began and the UK slave trade was disrupted. In response Francis Ingram became a privateer, often working in partnership with other slavers such as Thomas Leyland. A contemporary account from Rev. Gilbert Wakefield writes that the war caused a proliferation of privateers from Liverpool because the risk of losing a slave ship was too great for many slave traders. The merchants themselves would have preferred the slave trade continued unaffected. Ingram was the co-owner of a privateer ship called the Enterprise and his letters to the captain of the ship, Captain Haslam, have been preserved and document his communications. Enterprise went on its first trip to capture enemy vessels in September 1779, it had a crew of 106. Gomer Williams describes the privateering as little more than legalised piracy, saying that the switch of the ship merchants from the slave trade to privateering was hardly an improvement for Liverpool. He writes; "the standard of morality was so low in Liverpool, that even the introduction of piracy itself into the Mersey, as a fine art, would not have perceptibly altered the manners and morals of the masses." He added "To be fired with enthusiasm, to cruise about the seas in 'great spirits' replying to the enemy's remarks with hot broadsides, to face death manfully for the honour of Liverpool, must have done good to many a bankrupt soul". He writes that Ingram in his private letters to Captain Haslam does not discuss the atrocities that his crew were almost certainly committing. Instead he discusses perfunctory obligations that must be carried out to ensure he receives the maximum financial return.

The Enterprise captured a number of French vessels. The Le Vaillant was captured by Captain Haslam laden with wine, flour, sugar, but it was shipwrecked on 12 September 1780. Around 140 casks of claret and 74 barrels of flour were recovered from the shipwreck. On 14 September 1780, Enterprise captured Courier, it weighed 200 tons and had been travelling between Bordeaux and St. Sebastian. Its cargo was sold at the St. George's Coffee-house. It consisted of 141 casks of sugar, 82 bales of hemp, 7 hogsheads of claret, 1 hogshead of Virginia tobacco, paint, copper pans, marble slabs, looking glass frames, 12 new chairs, 41 new guns and 8 new carriages. On 22 October, the Enterprise having been at sea for around a month brought into the Liverpool L' Aventurier. When captured it had been on a trip from Martinico to Bordeaux carrying a cargo of 105 bales of cotton, 28 hogsheads of tobacco, 600 hogsheads of clayed sugar, 38 hogsheads of Muscovado sugar, 14 tierces and 23 barrels of sugar, 164 hogsheads, 49 tierces and 115 barrels of coffee, 6 tierces, 235 bags and 1 barrel of cocoa, 2000 lbs. of cassia fistula and 22 guns. The Enterprise also captured The San Pedro, the St. Joseph and Le Moineau.

== Banking ==
In the 1780s Ingram had loans from Heywood's Bank. It was common for slavers to finance their trade through credit as well as profits from earlier voyages. Ingram went into banking himself by using profits from the slave trade. He became a banking partner of Staniforth, Bold and Daltera and together they are recorded as having leased property on Poole Street, Liverpool in 1792.

== African Company of Merchants ==
Ingram was a member of the African Company of Merchants. The first meeting of the company took place in Liverpool, on 14 July 1777. Its purpose was to lobby the UK government and attempt to prevent the regulation of the slave trade. The Committee took place every Monday morning in Liverpool Town Hall. The others members included William Gregson, John Dobson, Joseph Brooks, Jun., Thomas Hodgson, Thomas Case, Benjamin Heywood, Thomas Staniforth, George Case, Thos. Rumbold, Thomas Birch, Richard Savage and James Caruthers.

== Personal life ==
His father, William Ingram (1704–1753) was an attorney in Wakefield, and a maltster. His grandfather, William Ingram (1668–1749) was also an attorney in Wakefield and steward of the Earl of Strafford. There are two other slave traders, also called William Ingram, who are likely to be related to Francis Ingram, one his elder brother and the other his second son. In 1787 Ingram purchased Ribbesford House in Ribbesford, near Bewdley in Worcestershire. Ingram used his slave trading wealth to improve the social standing of his offspring. His son John attended Cambridge University and became a lawyer.

== Sources ==
- Drake, B. K. "The Liverpool-African voyage c. 1790–1807" (PDF). The Historic Society of Lancashire and Cheshire.
- Richardson, David (2007). Liverpool and Transatlantic Slavery. UK: Liverpool University Press. ISBN 978-1-84631-066-9.
- Williams, Eric (1994) [1944]. Capitalism & Slavery. UK: University of North Carolina Press. ISBN 9780807844885.
- Williams, Gomer (1897). History of the Liverpool Privateers. UK: Liverpool University Press.
