= Sir Charles Lyttelton, 3rd Baronet =

English Governor of Jamaica, army officer and Member of Parliament

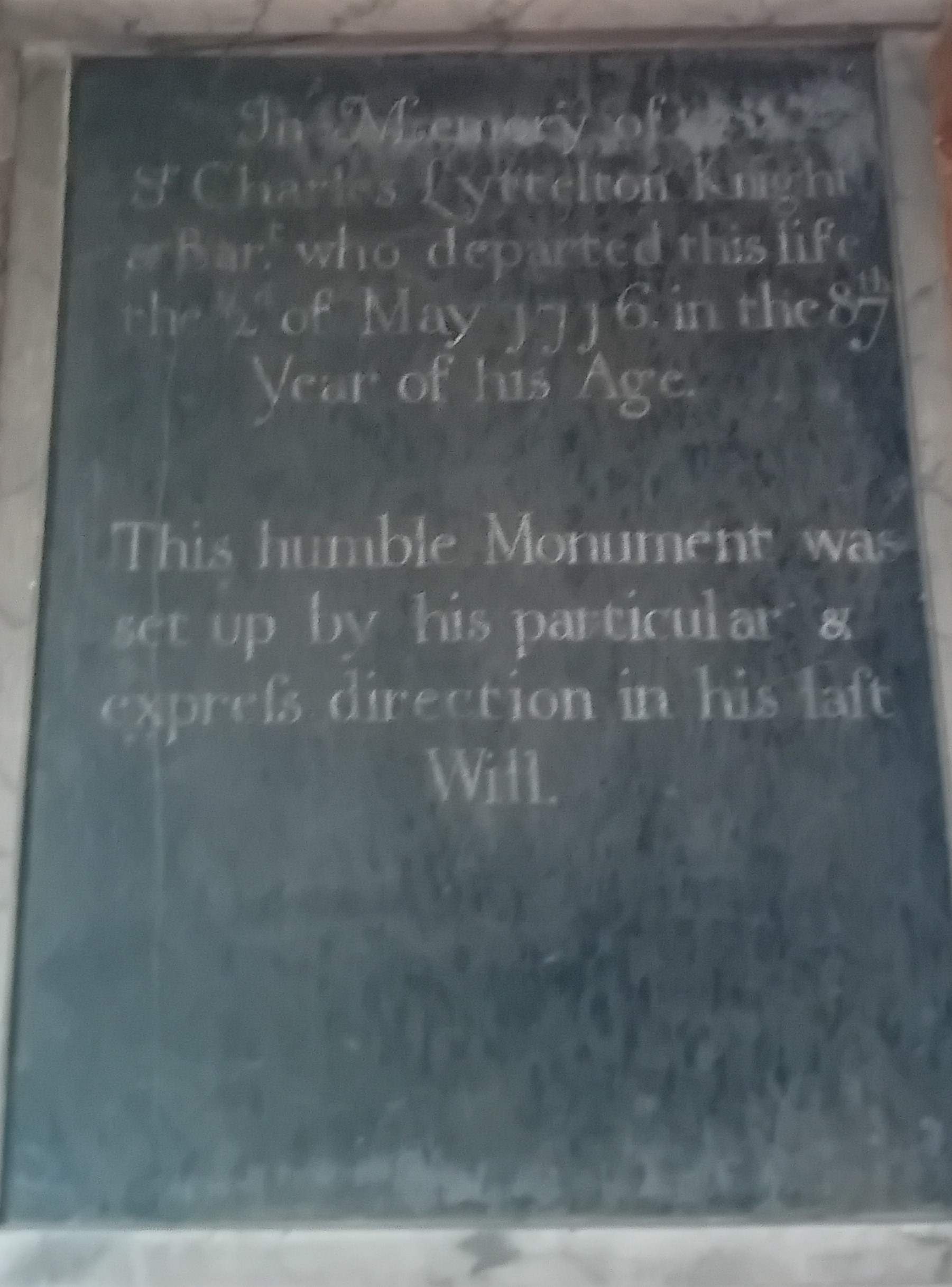
Monument to Sir Charles Lyttelton in St Peter's Church, Upper Arley

Sir Charles Lyttelton, 3rd Baronet, of Frankley, in the County of Worcester, MP (1628 – 2 May 1716) was one of the early English Governors of Jamaica, an army officer, and Member of Parliament from the Lyttelton family.

== Governor of Jamaica ==
Charles Lyttelton was the second son of Sir Thomas Lyttelton, 1st Baronet, of Frankley, in the County of Worcester, and Catherine Crompton. He fought in the Royalist Army and escaped to France in 1648. He was made Cupbearer to Charles II in 1650 while in exile and after the Restoration knighted in 1662.

In his brother's lifetime he served as an Army Officer, rising to a brigadier general and serving as governor of Jamaica from 1662 until 1664 and founded the first town of Port Royal, where he summoned the First Legislative Assembly in 1664, and of Harwich in 1667. In 1663, Governor Lyttelton signed the first treaty with the Jamaican Maroons, granting the maroons of Juan de Bolas and his people land on the same terms as English settlers.

== Military career ==
He was a major of the Yellow Coated Maritime Regiment, the precursor of the Royal Marines, governor of Harwich and Landguard Fort at the time of the Third Anglo-Dutch War in 1672, and governor of Sheerness in 1680.

He was a joint Agent for Jamaica from 1682 until 1685. He became Member of Parliament for Bewdley from 1685 until 1689. He inherited the Baronetcy and the family estates in Frankley, Halesowen, Hagley, and Upper Arley, in Worcestershire, on the death of his brother Sir Henry Lyttelton, 2nd Baronet, in 1693.

== Family ==
He married twice. His first wife Catherine, daughter of Sir William Fairfax of Steeton, Yorkshire and widow of Martin Lister of Thornton, Yorkshire, died with their child in Jamaica. His second wife Anne, daughter and coheiress of Thomas Temple of Frankton, Warwickshire, and Maid of Honour to Queen Catherine of Braganza bore him five sons and eight daughters. His eldest son Charles had died in his lifetime without issue, so he was succeeded by his second son Thomas.

== Notes ==
Government offices
Preceded by The Lord Windsor	Governor of Jamaica; 1662–1663 (acting)	Succeeded by Thomas Lynch (acting)
Military offices
Preceded by Nathaniel Darrell	Governor of Landguard Fort; 1670–1680	Succeeded by Sir Roger Manley
Preceded by Nathaniel Darrell	Governor of Sheerness; 1680–1690	Succeeded by Robert Crawford
Parliament of England
Preceded by Philip Foley	Member of Parliament for Bewdley; 1685–1689	Succeeded by Henry Herbert
Baronetage of England
Preceded by Henry Lyttelton	Baronet (of Frankley); 1693–1716	Succeeded by Thomas Lyttelton
