= Henry Herbert, 2nd Baron Herbert of Chirbury =

English Whig politician

Henry Herbert, 2nd Baron Herbert of Chirbury (died 19 April 1738), of Ribbesford, Worcestershire, was an English Whig politician who sat in the House of Commons from 1708 until 1709 when he succeeded to the peerage as Baron Herbert of Chirbury.

Herbert was born after 1678, the only son of Henry Herbert, 1st Baron Herbert of Chirbury and his wife Anne Ramsey, daughter of John Ramsey, Dyer, of London. He was educated at Westminster School in 1695 and then privately under Abel Boyer in 1699.

Herbert stood for Parliament at Bewdley at the 1705 English general election but was defeated in the poll and was then unsuccessful with a petition. His father, a staunch Whig, then procured a new charter for Bewdley and was able to take control of the borough. Herbert junior was returned as a Whig Member of Parliament for Bewdley at the 1708 British general election. His father died on 22 January 1709 and Herbert succeeded to the peerage. Consequently he vacated his seat in the House of Commons to sit in the House of Lords. There he continued to challenge a petition against his election in order to secure the new charter.

Lord Herbert married Mary Wallop, daughter of John Wallop of Farley Wallop, Hampshire, on 12 December 1709. She was the sister of John Wallop, 1st Earl of Portsmouth. Herbert's election expenses had helped bring him into financial difficulties. By 1713 he was serving the Tory ministry of Robert Harley, Earl of Oxford, who personally funded Herbert so he could stay in London and vote. When the Whigs were in control after 1714, Herbert reverted to his original allegiance in the hope of securing financial aid. He died without issue on 19 April 1738, at Ribbesford, allegedly by suicide. His widow died in 1770.

Parliament of Great Britain
Preceded by Salwey Winnington	Member of Parliament for Bewdley; 1708–1709	Succeeded by Charles Cornewall
Peerage of England
Preceded by Henry Herbert	Baron Herbert of Chirbury; 1708–1738	Extinct
