= Miles Peter Andrews =

18th-century English playwright, gunpowder manufacturer and politician (1742 – 1814)

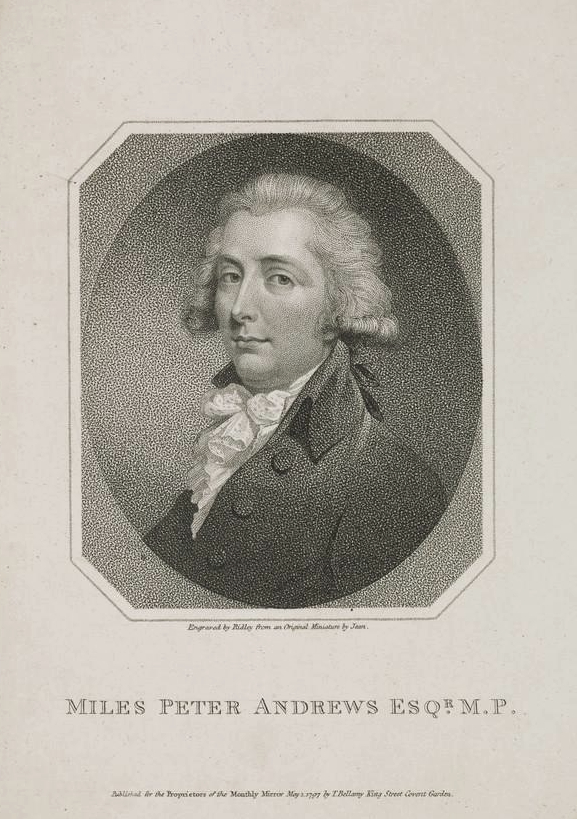
- 1797 engraving

Member of Parliament for Bewdley
- In office 1796–1814

Personal details
- Born: 1742
- Died: 18 July 1814 (aged 71–72)

Miles Peter Andrews (1742 – 18 July 1814) was an 18th-century English playwright, gunpowder manufacturer and politician who sat in the House of Commons from 1796 to 1814.

== Biography ==
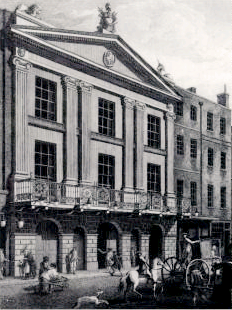
Drury Lane Theatre in 1775

Andrews was the son of William Andrews, a drysalter of Watling Street and his wife Catherine Pigou. After helping his father in business in the day time, he was "accustomed to sally forth in the evening with sword and bag to Ranelagh or some other public place". He gradually made useful social connections and became a constant companion of Lord Lyttelton. He wrote plays musicals and operas. The first was performed at Drury Lane in 1774. In 1775 the opera diva Ann Cargill aged 15 ran away with him and she then had to be restrained at home by a court order. Andrews had several further plays performed at the Haymarket. Andrews lived in a mansion at Green Park where he entertained the fashionable society of London, and was a member of several clubs.

With his uncle Frederick Pigou, a director of the British East India Company, Andrews became the owner of an extensive gunpowder factory at Hawley Mills on the River Darent at Dartford, Kent. George Colman the Younger described Andrews as "one of the most persevering poetical pests", and his plays as "like his powder mills, particularly hazardous affairs, and in great danger of going off with a sudden and violent explosion". This was no idle comparison as an explosion occurred in October 1790.

"Between four and five o'clock this afternoon (October 12th 1790) the people here, and in the neighbourhood, were terribly alarmed by the blowing up of Mr Pegu (sic)'s Powder Mills, within a short mile of this town.."

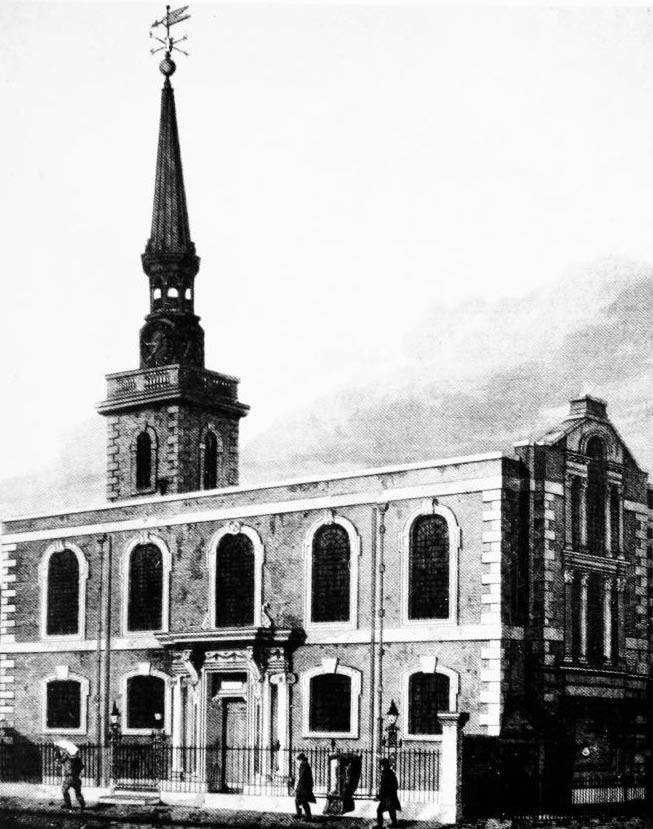
St James's Piccadilly in 1815.

In 1796 Andrews succeeded Lord Lyttleton as member of parliament for Bewdley which he represented until his death in 1814. There is a memorial to him in St James's Church, Piccadilly.

== Works ==
- The Conjuror, a farce – Drury Lane 1774
- A new musical interlude, called The election – Drury Lane 1774
- Belphegor, or the Wishes, a comic opera – Drury Lane 1778
- Summer Amusement, or an Adventure at Margate (written with William Augustus Miles) – the Haymarket 1779
- Fire and Water, a ballad opera – the Haymarket in 1780
- Dissipation, a comedy – Drury Lane 1781
- The Baron Kinkvervankotsdorsprakingatchdern– the Haymarket 1781
- The Best Bidder, a farce – the Haymarket 1782
- Reparation, a comedy. As performed at the Theatre-Royal in Drury-Lane – Drury Lane 1784
- The songs, recitatives, airs, duets, trios, and chorusses, introduced in the pantomime entertainment, of The enchanted castle, as performed at the Theatre-Royal, Covent-Garden. The words by Miles Peter Andrews, Esq; and the music by Mr. Shields
- Better Late than Never – Drury Lane 1790
- The Mysteries of the Castle – Covent Garden 1795

== Notes ==
Parliament of Great Britain
Preceded by George Lyttelton	Member of Parliament for Bewdley; 1796–1800	Succeeded by Parliament of the United Kingdom
Parliament of the United Kingdom
Preceded by Parliament of Great Britain	Member of Parliament for Bewdley; 1801–1814	Succeeded by Charles Edward Wilsonn
