= Salwey Winnington =

English landowner and Member of Parliament

Salwey Winnington (28 August 1666 – 6 November 1736), of Stanford Court, Worcestershire, was an English landowner and Member of Parliament (MP).

Winnington was the eldest son of Sir Francis Winnington, a lawyer and politician who was Solicitor General in the 1670s. He himself also entered the Middle Temple to study law.

He entered Parliament in 1694 as MP for Bewdley, one of the small number of English constituencies which was represented only by a single MP, and was its member for all but two-and-a-half years of the next twenty.

In 1690, Winnington married Anne Foley, daughter of Thomas Foley of Witley Court and sister of Lord Foley. They had one son, Thomas Winnington, who became a Member of Parliament and Privy Counsellor, and five daughters.

Parliament of England
| Preceded by Henry Herbert | Member of Parliament for Bewdley; 1694–1707 | Succeeded by Parliament of Great Britain |
Parliament of Great Britain
| Preceded by Parliament of England | Member of Parliament for Bewdley; 1707–1708 | Succeeded by Hon. Henry Herbert |
| Preceded by Anthony Lechmere | Member of Parliament for Bewdley; 1710–1715 | Succeeded by Grey James Grove |
