= Enoch Baldwin =

English iron founder and politician

Enoch Baldwin (5 August 1822 – 1905) was an English iron founder and Liberal politician who sat in the House of Commons from 1880 to 1885.

Baldwin was the son of Enoch Baldwin, iron founder of Stourport-on-Severn, whose brother was George Pearce Baldwin. He became a member of the family firm of Baldwin, Son & Co in 1839, becoming in time senior partner.

In 1880, Baldwin was elected Member of Parliament for Bewdley after the sitting MP Charles Harrison was unseated on petition. He held the seat until 1885. He subsequently became JP for Worcestershire and in March 1889 a County Councillor.

Baldwin lived at The Mount, Stourport, and died at the age of 82. He was first cousin to Alfred Baldwin.

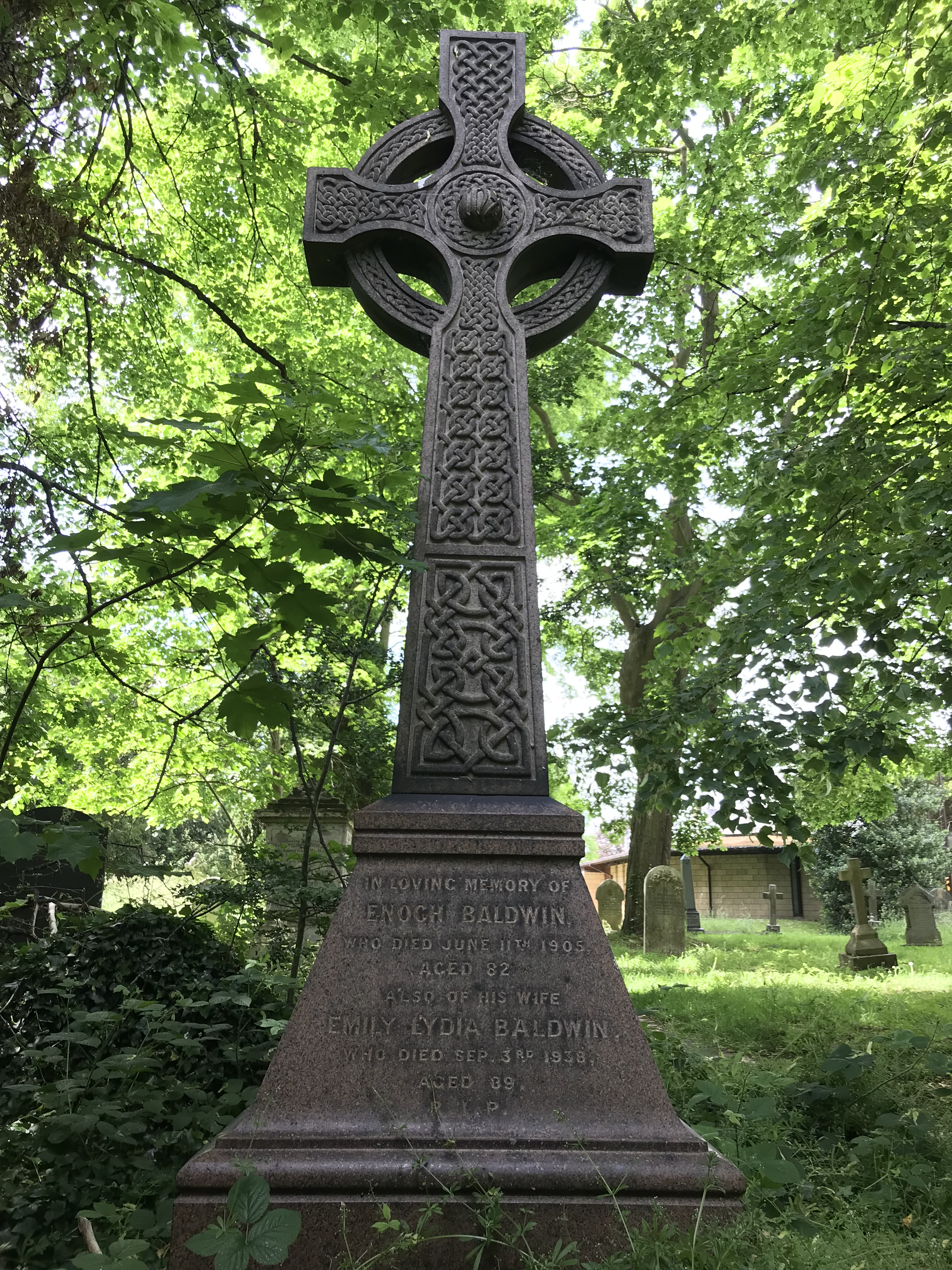
Grave of Enoch Baldwin

Baldwin married Elizabeth Langford Tildesley daughter of Henry Tildesley on 27 Feb 1849. She died in 1875 and he married secondly on 19 July 1876 to Emily Lydia Driver daughter of Rev. George Frederick Driver a Wesleyan minister.

Parliament of the United Kingdom
| Preceded by Charles Harrison | Member of Parliament for Bewdley; 1880–1885 | Succeeded by Sir Edmund Lechmere |
