= 1921 Bewdley by-election =

UK Parliamentary by-election

← 1918	19 April 1921	1922 →
Candidate	Baldwin	Mills
Party	Unionist	Independent Labour
Popular vote	14,537	1,680
Percentage	89.6%	10.4%
MP before election
Baldwin
Unionist
Subsequent MP
Baldwin
Unionist

The 1921 Bewdley by-election was held on 19 April 1921. The by-election was held due to the incumbent Coalition Conservative MP, Stanley Baldwin, being appointed President of the Board of Trade. It was retained by Baldwin.

Bewdley by-election, 1921
Party		Candidate	Votes	%	±%
C	Unionist	Stanley Baldwin	14,537	89.6	N/A
	Independent Labour	H. Mills	1,680	10.4	New
Majority			12,857	79.2	N/A
Turnout			16,217	63.7	N/A
Registered electors			25,440		
	Unionist hold		Swing	N/A	
C indicates candidate endorsed by the coalition government.
