= Bewdley (constituency) =

Parliamentary constituency in the United Kingdom, 1801–1950

Worcestershire, Bewdley
- Former county constituency for the House of Commons

1885–1950
- Seats: One
- Replaced by: Kidderminster and South Worcestershire

Bewdley
- Former borough constituency for the House of Commons

1605–1885
- Seats: One

Bewdley was the name of a constituency of the House of Commons of England from 1605 and from 1707 the House of Commons of the Parliament of the United Kingdom until 1950. Until 1885 it was a parliamentary borough in Worcestershire, represented by one Member of Parliament; the name was then transferred to a county constituency from 1885 until 1950. Its MPs included the former Prime Minister Stanley Baldwin, who represented the seat from 1908 to 1937, and afterwards took the name of the constituency as part of his title when he was raised to the peerage.

== Boundaries ==
1885–1918: The Boroughs of Bewdley and Worcester, the Sessional Divisions of Hundred House, Tenbury, and Worcester, and part of the Sessional Divisions of Malvern and Stourport.

1918–1950: The Borough of Bewdley, the Urban Districts of Malvern and Stourport, the Rural Districts of Hartley, Rock, Tenbury, and Upton-on-Severn, the Rural District which consisted of the parishes of Redmarley D'Abitot and Staunton, and in the Rural District of Tewkesbury the parishes of Chaceley and Pendock.

== History ==
=== The unreformed borough (1605–1832) ===
Bewdley was enfranchised in 1605, being one of only a handful of English boroughs electing one rather than two MPs. The borough consisted of part of Ribbesford parish in Worcestershire, of which the market town of Bewdley was the main settlement. In 1831, the population of the borough was 3,908, and contained 891 houses.

The right to vote was exercised by the bailiff and burgesses (members of the town corporation, who need not necessarily be resident in the borough); this normally amounted to only 13 voters, though the report to Parliament before the Reform Act recorded the electorate as 42. (The discrepancy is perhaps academic, since it was many years since there had been a contested election.)

In the second half of the 17th century, the inhabitants at large made several attempts to secure the right to vote by petitioning against the election results, but in each case the Commons upheld the restrictive provisions of the original grant. The corporation were entitled to nominate their own successors, meaning in theory that their power was self-sustaining. However, in the early 18th century this was circumvented by issuing a new Royal charter for the borough that extinguished the existing corporation and appointed a new one. In 1708 the Whig government had a new charter issued to eject the existing Tory-dominated corporation, and at that year's election both the old and new corporations attempted to exercise their right to vote; the Whig majority in the Commons upheld the new charter and seated the Whig candidate. After the 1710 election, however, the Whig government had lost its Commons majority and the new House declared the charter of 1708 void and the Tory candidate victorious. However, the repeal of the charter could only be secured through recourse to the courts, and although an action was begun it appears that the various parties made up their political differences before it reached a conclusion, and all sides eventually acquiesced in the new corporation's legitimacy.

For most of Bewdley's existence as a borough until the Reform Act, the corporation (and therefore the choice of its MP) was under the influence of one or other prominent local families. In the mid-17th century this control was exercised by the Foley family, but after they acquired a hold on nearby Droitwich (which elected two MPs) their interest in Bewdley seems to have waned – possibly because in Droitwich they were able to secure legal ownership of the voting rights, whereas in Bewdley they had to proceed by bribery. (In 1677, the Commons upheld a petition against Thomas Foley's election on grounds of bribery, and declared his opponent duly elected in his place.) At later periods the "patronage" was held alternately by the Lytteltons and the Winningtons; but from 1806 the influence passed to a local attorney, Wilson Roberts.

=== The reformed borough (1832–1885) ===
Under the Reform Act 1832, which liberalised the franchise, Bewdley's boundaries were also extended to take in the whole of Ribbesford parish; this brought six hamlets into the borough, and almost doubled the population to 7,500. This new constituency had 337 electors qualified to vote in 1832, and the second extension of the franchise with a further expansion of the borough boundaries in 1867 increased this to just over 1,000. At this period, elections were sometimes uncontested when the candidate was the head of the locally influential Winnington family, but otherwise were generally close-run affairs with the winning majority frequently under 20.

=== The county division (1885–1950) ===
The borough was too small to retain separate representation after the Third Reform Act, and was abolished with effect from the general election of 1885; however, the Bewdley name was transferred to the new county division in which the town was placed, formally called The Western or Bewdley Division of Worcestershire. This new constituency comprised the whole of the western half of the county, largely rural but including the town of Great Malvern, which contributed about a third of the population; the Worcester freeholders (who were entitled to a county vote even though their property was within the borough boundaries) also voted here. It was a very safe Conservative seat. Alfred Baldwin was elected as MP in 1892, holding the seat until his death in 1908. He was succeeded by his son, Stanley, who later became Prime Minister while still Bewdley's MP.

The constituency (now simply the Worcestershire, Bewdley Division) was redrawn in 1918, its southern end being transferred to the Evesham seat and acquiring instead part of the north-western corner of the county including Stourport, previously in the abolished Droitwich division. These changes had little effect on the political complexion of Bewdley, and Baldwin generally secured twice as many votes as his nearest opponent, when the constituency was contested at all – indeed, in three of the five elections he fought as Prime Minister Bewdley returned him unopposed.

The Bewdley division was abolished with effect from the general election of 1950, being divided between the Kidderminster constituency (in which Bewdley itself was placed) and Worcestershire South (which included Malvern).

== Members of Parliament ==
=== Bewdley borough 1605–1885 ===
Year	Member	Party
1605	Richard Young	
1614	James Button	
1621	Sir Thomas Edmonds	
1624	Ralph Clare	
1640 (Apr)	Sir Henry Herbert	Royalist
1640 (Nov)	Sir Henry Herbert	Royalist
August 1642	Herbert disabled from sitting – seat vacant	
1647	William Hopkins	
1648	Nicholas Lechmere	
1653	Bewdley was unrepresented in the Barebones Parliament and the First and Second Parliaments of the Protectorate	
January 1659	Edward Pytts	
May 1659	Nicholas Lechmere	
April 1660	Thomas Foley	
1661	Sir Henry Herbert	
1673	Thomas Foley	
1677	Henry Herbert	
1679	Philip Foley	
1685	Sir Charles Lyttelton, Bt	
1689	Henry Herbert	Whig
1694	Salwey Winnington	Tory
1708	Hon. Henry Herbert	Whig
1709	Charles Cornwall	Tory
October 1710	Anthony Lechmere	Whig
December 1710	Salwey Winnington	Tory
1715	Grey James Grove	Whig
1722	Crewe Offley	Whig
1734	William Bowles	Whig
1735	Phineas Bowles	Whig
1741	William Bowles	Whig
1748	William Lyttelton	Tory
1755	William Finch	
1761	Sir Edward Winnington, 1st Bt	Whig
1768	Hon. Thomas Lyttelton	Tory
1769	Sir Edward Winnington, 1st Bt	Whig
1774	William Lyttelton	Tory
1790	Hon. George Lyttelton	Tory
1796	Miles Peter Andrews	Tory
1814	Charles Wilsonn	Tory
1818	Wilson Roberts	Tory
1832	Sir Thomas Winnington, 3rd Bt	Whig
1837	Thomas Winnington	Whig
1847	Thomas James Ireland	Conservative
1848	William Montagu	Conservative
1852	Sir Thomas Winnington, 4th Bt	Whig
1859	Sir Thomas Winnington, 4th Bt	Liberal
1868	Sir Richard Atwood Glass	Conservative
1869	John Pickersgill-Cunliffe	Conservative
1869	Augustus Anson	Liberal
1874	Charles Harrison	Liberal
1880	Enoch Baldwin	Liberal
1885	Borough abolished – name transferred to county division	

=== Bewdley county division 1885–1950 ===
Election	Member	Party
1885	Sir Edmund Lechmere, Bt	Conservative
1892	Alfred Baldwin	Conservative
1908 by-election	Stanley Baldwin	Conservative
1937 by-election	Roger Conant	Conservative
1950	constituency abolished: see Kidderminster & South Worcestershire	

== Elections ==
1830s – 1840s – 1850s – 1860s – 1870s – 1880s – 1890s – 1900s – 1910s – 1920s – 1930s – 1940s – Notes

=== Elections in the 1830s ===
General election 1830: Bewdley
Party	Candidate	Votes	%	±%
Tory	Wilson Aylesbury Roberts	Unopposed		
Tory hold				

General election 1831: Bewdley
Party	Candidate	Votes	%	±%
Tory	Wilson Aylesbury Roberts	Unopposed		
Tory hold				

General election 1832: Bewdley
Party	Candidate	Votes	%	±%
Whig	Thomas Winnington	Unopposed		
Registered electors		337		
Whig gain from Tory				

General election 1835: Bewdley
Party	Candidate	Votes	%	±%
Whig	Thomas Winnington	Unopposed		
Registered electors		414		
Whig hold				

General election 1837: Bewdley
Party	Candidate	Votes	%	±%
Whig	Thomas Winnington	Unopposed		
Registered electors		400		
Whig hold				

=== Elections in the 1840s ===
General election 1841: Bewdley
Party	Candidate	Votes	%	±%
Whig	Thomas Winnington	173	50.7	N/A
Conservative	Robert Monteith	168	49.3	New
Majority		5	1.4	N/A
Turnout		341	83.0	N/A
Registered electors		411		
Whig hold		Swing	N/A	

General election 1847: Bewdley
Party	Candidate	Votes	%	±%
Conservative	Thomas James Ireland	160	50.3	+1.0
Whig	Thomas Winnington	158	49.7	−1.0
Majority		2	0.6	N/A
Turnout		318	83.9	+0.9
Registered electors		411		
Conservative gain from Whig		Swing	+1.0	

Ireland's election was declared void on petition due to bribery and corrupt treating, causing a by-election.

By-election, 18 April 1848: Bewdley
Party	Candidate	Votes	%	±%
Conservative	William Montagu	171	52.3	+2.0
Whig	Spencer Lyttelton	156	47.7	−2.0
Majority		15	4.6	+4.0
Turnout		327	83.0	−0.9
Registered electors		394		
Conservative hold		Swing	+2.0	

Back to Elections

=== Elections in the 1850s ===
General election 1852: Bewdley
Party	Candidate	Votes	%	±%
Whig	Thomas Winnington	169	52.8	+3.1
Peelite	Joseph Sandars	151	47.2	−3.1
Majority		18	5.6	N/A
Turnout		320	82.1	−1.8
Registered electors		390		
Whig gain from Conservative		Swing	+3.1	

General election 1857: Bewdley
Party	Candidate	Votes	%	±%
Whig	Thomas Winnington	Unopposed		
Registered electors		370		
Whig hold				

General election 1859: Bewdley
Party	Candidate	Votes	%	±%
Liberal	Thomas Winnington	Unopposed		
Registered electors		386		
Liberal hold				

Back to Elections

=== Elections in the 1860s ===
General election 1865: Bewdley
Party	Candidate	Votes	%	±%
Liberal	Thomas Winnington	Unopposed		
Registered electors		356		
Liberal hold				

General election 1868: Bewdley
Party	Candidate	Votes	%	±%
Conservative	Richard Atwood Glass	518	55.3	New
Liberal	Thomas Lloyd	418	44.7	N/A
Majority		100	10.6	N/A
Turnout		936	89.7	N/A
Registered electors		1,043		
Conservative gain from Liberal		Swing	N/A	

The election was declared void on petition on grounds of bribery.

By-election, 11 Mar 1869: Bewdley
Party	Candidate	Votes	%	±%
Conservative	John Pickersgill-Cunliffe	477	50.7	−4.6
Liberal	Augustus Anson	463	49.3	+4.6
Majority		14	1.4	−9.2
Turnout		940	90.1	+0.4
Registered electors		1,043		
Conservative hold		Swing	+4.6	

This by-election was also subject to petition. On scrutiny, Cunliffe was unseated and Anson was named MP in his place. Back to Elections

=== Elections in the 1870s ===
General election 1874: Bewdley
Party	Candidate	Votes	%	±%
Liberal	Charles Harrison	504	55.4	+10.7
Conservative	Stanley Leighton	405	44.5	−10.8
Independent Liberal	George Griffith	1	0.1	New
Majority		99	10.9	N/A
Turnout		910	84.1	−5.6
Registered electors		1,082		
Liberal gain from Conservative		Swing	+10.8	

Back to Elections

=== Elections in the 1880s ===
General election 1880: Bewdley
Party	Candidate	Votes	%	±%
Liberal	Charles Harrison	598	53.0	−2.4
Conservative	Richard Webster	530	47.0	+2.5
Majority		68	6.0	−4.9
Turnout		1,128	91.9	+7.8
Registered electors		1,228		
Liberal hold		Swing	−2.5	

The result was declared void on petition, causing a by-election.

By-election, 13 Jul 1880: Bewdley
Party	Candidate	Votes	%	±%
Liberal	Enoch Baldwin	611	55.4	+2.4
Liberal	William Nichols Marcy	491	44.6	−2.4
Majority		120	10.8	+4.8
Turnout		1,102	89.7	−2.2
Registered electors		1,228		
Conservative hold		Swing	+2.4	

General election 1885: Bewdley
Party	Candidate	Votes	%	±%
Conservative	Sir Edmund Lechmere, Bt	4,525	60.0	+13.0
Liberal	John Fell	3,015	40.0	−13.0
Majority		1,510	20.0	N/A
Turnout		7,540	76.7	−15.2
Registered electors		9,833		
Conservative gain from Liberal		Swing	+15.4	

General election 1886: Bewdley
Party	Candidate	Votes	%	±%
Conservative	Sir Edmund Lechmere, Bt	Unopposed		
Conservative hold				

Back to Elections

=== Elections in the 1890s ===
Alfred Baldwin

General election 1892: Bewdley
Party	Candidate	Votes	%	±%
Conservative	Alfred Baldwin	Unopposed		
Conservative hold				

General election 1895: Bewdley
Party	Candidate	Votes	%	±%
Conservative	Alfred Baldwin	Unopposed		
Conservative hold				

Back to Elections

=== Elections in the 1900s ===
General election 1900: Bewdley
Party	Candidate	Votes	%	±%
Conservative	Alfred Baldwin	Unopposed		
Conservative hold				

General election 1906: Bewdley
Party	Candidate	Votes	%	±%
Conservative	Alfred Baldwin	5,912	68.5	N/A
Liberal	Godfrey Benson	2,718	31.5	New
Majority		3,194	37.0	N/A
Turnout		8,630	84.4	N/A
Registered electors		10,231		
Conservative hold		Swing	N/A	

1908 Bewdley by-election
Party	Candidate	Votes	%	±%
Conservative	Stanley Baldwin	Unopposed		
Conservative hold				

Back to Elections

=== Elections in the 1910s ===
General election January 1910: Bewdley
Party	Candidate	Votes	%	±%
Conservative	Stanley Baldwin	6,618	73.6	+5.1
Liberal	J.L. Brooks	2,370	26.4	−5.1
Majority		4,248	47.2	+10.2
Turnout		8,988	84.5	+0.1
Registered electors		10,638		
Conservative hold		Swing	+5.1	

General election December 1910: Bewdley
Party	Candidate	Votes	%	±%
Conservative	Stanley Baldwin	Unopposed		
Conservative hold				

General Election 1914–15:

Another General Election was required to take place before the end of 1915. The political parties had been making preparations for an election to take place and by July 1914, the following candidates had been selected;

- Unionist: Stanley Baldwin
- Liberal:

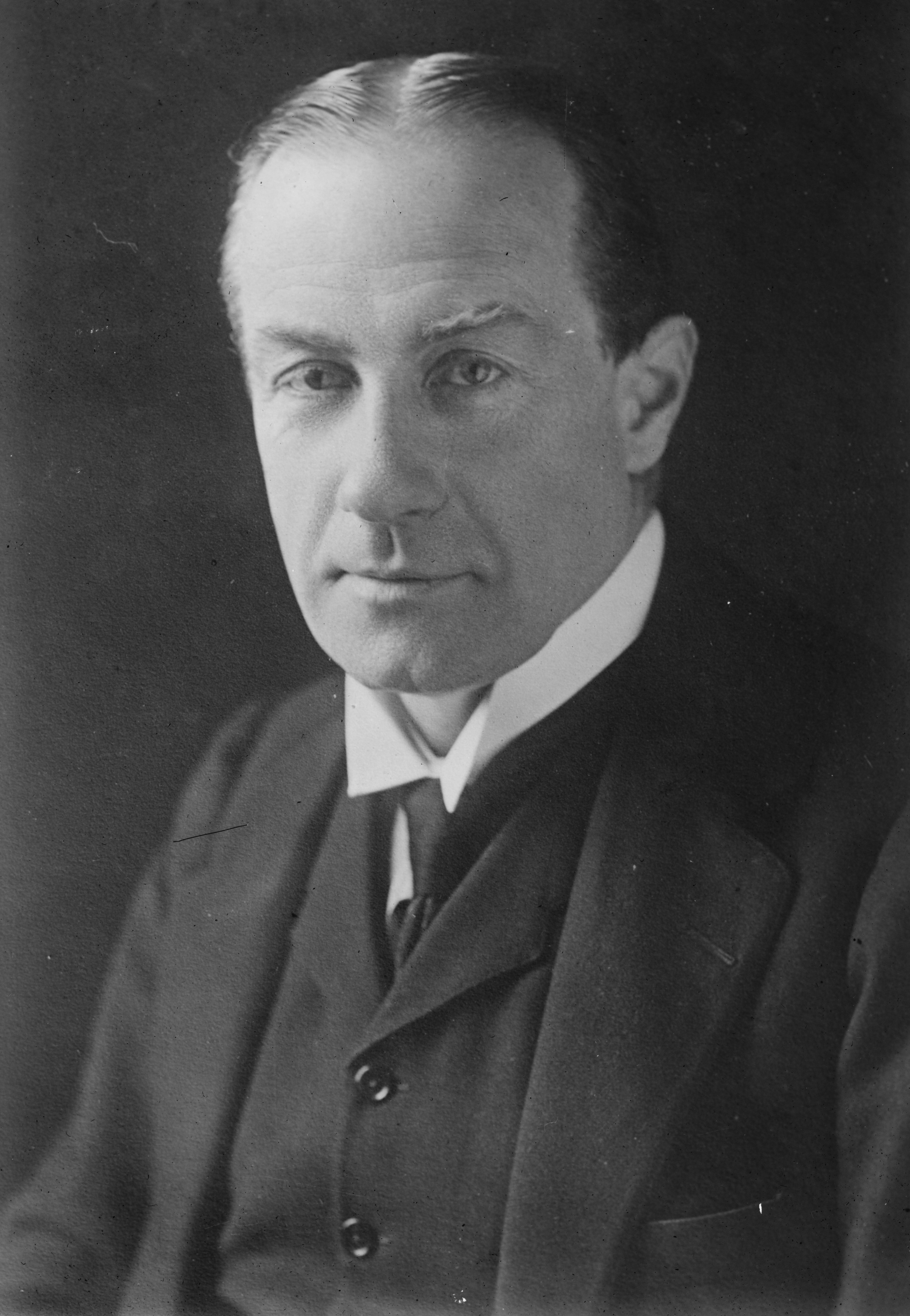
Stanley Baldwin

General election 1918: Bewdley
Party		Candidate	Votes	%	±%
C	Unionist	Stanley Baldwin	Unopposed		
	Unionist hold				
C indicates candidate endorsed by the coalition government.

Back to Elections

=== Elections in the 1920s ===
By-election, 1921: Bewdley
Party		Candidate	Votes	%	±%
C	Unionist	Stanley Baldwin	14,537	89.6	N/A
	Independent Labour	H. Mills	1,680	10.4	New
Majority			12,857	79.2	N/A
Turnout			16,217	63.7	N/A
Registered electors			25,440		
	Unionist hold		Swing	N/A	
C indicates candidate endorsed by the coalition government.

General election 1922: Bewdley
Party	Candidate	Votes	%	±%
Unionist	Stanley Baldwin	11,192	66.1	N/A
Liberal	Sardius Hancock	5,748	33.9	New
Majority		5,444	32.2	N/A
Turnout		16,940	64.7	N/A
Unionist hold		Swing	N/A	

General election 1923: Bewdley
Party	Candidate	Votes	%	±%
Unionist	Stanley Baldwin	12,395	67.3	+1.2
Liberal	Sardius Hancock	6,026	32.7	−1.2
Majority		6,369	34.6	+2.4
Turnout		18,421	68.8	+4.1
Unionist hold		Swing	+1.2	

General election 1924: Bewdley
Party	Candidate	Votes	%	±%
Unionist	Stanley Baldwin	Unopposed	N/A	N/A
Unionist hold				

General election 1929: Bewdley
Party	Candidate	Votes	%	±%
Unionist	Stanley Baldwin	16,593	62.9	N/A
Liberal	Sidney Benjamin Carter	7,186	27.3	New
Labour	Sardius Hancock	2,575	9.8	New
Majority		9,407	35.6	N/A
Turnout		26,354	71.3	N/A
Unionist hold		Swing	N/A	

Back to Elections

=== Elections in the 1930s ===
General election 1931: Bewdley
Party	Candidate	Votes	%	±%
Conservative	Stanley Baldwin	Unopposed	N/A	N/A
Conservative hold				

General election 1935: Bewdley
Party	Candidate	Votes	%	±%
Conservative	Stanley Baldwin	Unopposed	N/A	N/A
Conservative hold				

1937 Bewdley by-election
Party	Candidate	Votes	%	±%
Conservative	Roger Conant	15,054	63.9	N/A
Liberal	Donald Johnson	8,511	36.1	New
Majority		6,543	27.8	N/A
Turnout		23,565	60.6	N/A
Conservative hold		Swing	N/A	

Back to Elections

=== Elections in the 1940s ===
A General election was due to take place before the end of 1940, but was postponed due to the Second World War. By 1939, the following candidates had been selected to contest this constituency;

- Conservative: Roger Conant
- Liberal: Donald Johnson

General election 1945: Bewdley
Party	Candidate	Votes	%	±%
Conservative	Roger Conant	17,393	55.0	N/A
Liberal	Gerald Samson	14,223	45.0	N/A
Majority		3,170	10.0	N/A
Turnout		31,616	67.5	N/A
Conservative hold		Swing		

Back to Elections

== Notes ==
Parliament of the United Kingdom
Preceded by Glasgow Hillhead	Constituency represented by the chancellor of the Exchequer; 1922–1923	Succeeded by Birmingham Ladywood
Preceded by Glasgow Central	Constituency represented by the prime minister 1923–1924	Succeeded by Aberavon
Preceded by Aberavon	Constituency represented by the prime minister 1924–1929	Succeeded by Seaham
Preceded by Seaham	Constituency represented by the prime minister 1935–1937	Succeeded by Birmingham Edgbaston
