= Ribbesford House =

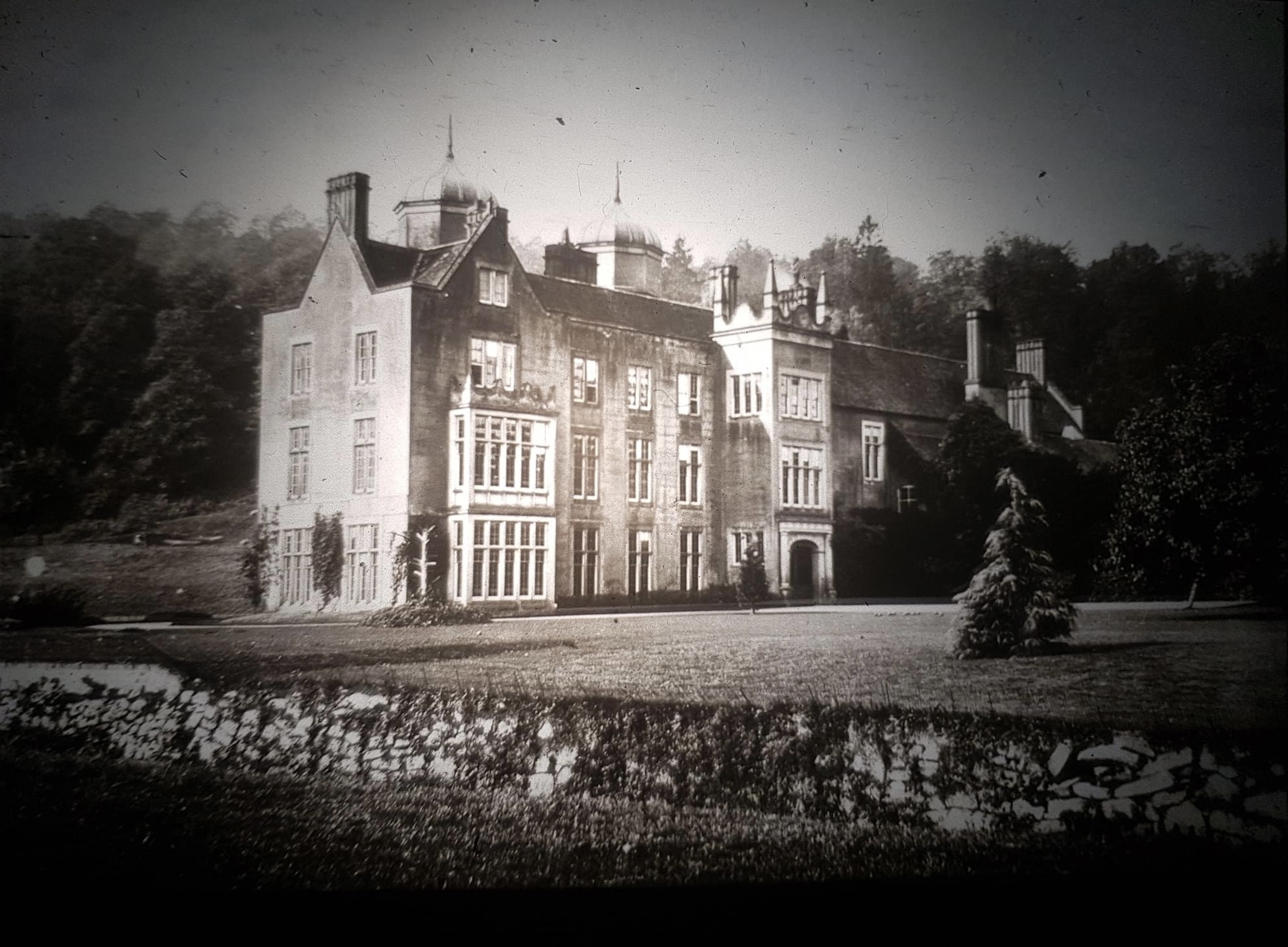
- Ribbesford House, early 20th century

- Location within Worcestershire

General information
- Type: Mansion
- Architectural style: Jacobean
- Location: Ribbesford, Bewdley, Worcestershire, England
- Coordinates: 52.3622°N 2.315°W
- Ordnance Survey: SO7864273840

Listed Building – Grade II*
- Official name: Ribbesford House
- Designated: 20 October 1952
- Reference no.: 1329928

Ribbesford House is a historic English mansion in Ribbesford, near Bewdley, Worcestershire. The house and its surrounding estate have a history dating back nearly a thousand years. The current house is a Grade II* listed building which has architectural elements ranging from the 16th to the 19th century.

== Description ==
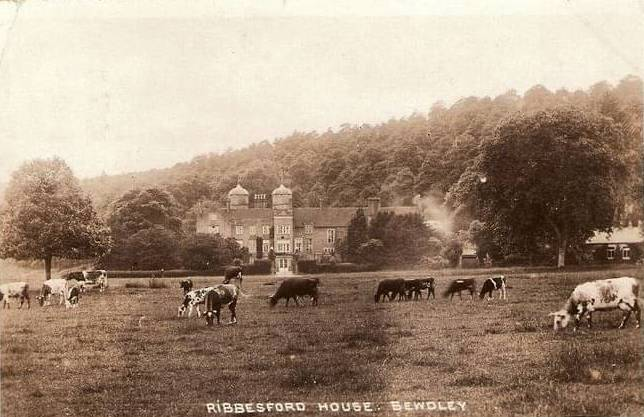
Ribbesford House c.1915

Ribbesford House lies to the south of Ribbesford, near the banks of the River Severn. The house has 20 bedrooms, 10 reception rooms and nine bathrooms over three storeys. The building has two octagonal turrets. The estate includes a cottage, outbuildings and eight acres of land with gardens and a woodland.

It is speculated that the current shape of Ribbesford House is half a quadrangle, the other half being demolished after Francis Ingram purchased the house in 1787.

Ribbesford House is listed on the Heritage at Risk Register which is compiled by Historic England. This is due to parts of the building suffering from major water ingress, causing rapid decay.

== History ==
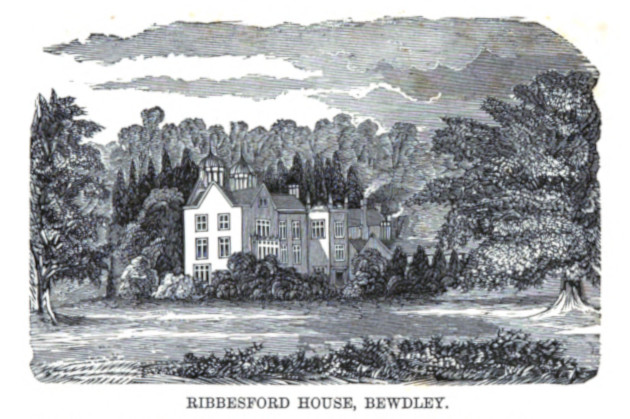
An illustration of Ribbesford House taken from 'Ribbesford and Other Poems' by George Griffith (1868)

An Anglo-Saxon charter from the early 11th century mentions that the estate was given by Bishop Wulfstan to his sister. It was seized by the Danes, then regained by the monks, only to be captured by Turstin the Fleming. In 1074 the estate was presented to Ralph de Mortimer in recognition of his services to William the Conqueror. Ribbesford House takes its name from the Ribbesford family, who lived there during the reign of Henry II. It is believed that the house was rebuilt in the 1530s under the ownership of Sir Robert Acton. Around the same time John Leland called it a "goodly manour place."

In 1627 King Charles passed the estate of Ribbesford House to Edward Herbert, 1st Baron Herbert of Cherbury and his two brothers George and Henry. Their coat of arms still stands at the property bearing the Welsh motto Pawb yn y Arver (Everyone has his customs). Henry who was Master of the Revels for Charles I and Charles II either side of the Cromwellian interlude bought out his brothers for the sum of £3,500 after he received £5,000 as a settlement on marrying Susanna Sleford. Henry was declared a Royalist delinquent by Parliament during the Civil War and had to compound for his estates in the sum of £1330 in 1646. Henry sat out his "retirement" at Ribbesford until the end of the Republic when he again resumed his duties as Master of the Revels, but this time under Charles II. The correspondence of his son Henry with Oliver Cromwell, Elizabeth Stuart and other contemporaries was discovered in one of the towers. Parts of the house were renovated in 1669. The estate was purchased in 1787 by Francis Ingram who demolished the larger part of the house and filled in the moat which surrounded it.

Famous visitors to Ribbesford House have included Bewdley-born prime minister Stanley Baldwin and his cousin writer Rudyard Kipling. By 1924, it was a residence of the Lees-Milne family. The mansion was used to train Free French soldiers during World War II, when 211 French soldiers stayed at the property. Charles de Gaulle is believed to have regularly visited them there. About a third of the soldiers were later killed in the war. The house was also used as the headquarters of the British 18th Infantry Division, by American military, and for Polish and Italian prisoners of war. The property was bought in 1947 by RAF Wing Commander Alfred John Howell, who converted it into private apartments.

Ribbesford House was Grade II* listed in 1952. At the time, it was described as a "Country house, now flats. Mid-C16, partly rebuilt late C17, remodelled early C19 with some mid-C20 alterations". The 1968 Pevsner's guide, The Buildings of England: Worcestershire, included the house and property in its coverage.

In 2018, Howell's daughter Merryn placed the estate for sale by auction with a guide price of £500,000. It was purchased for £810,000 by Samuel Leeds and his brother Russell Leeds through one of their companies, Samuel Leeds Ltd. Leeds claimed that when the project was completed, Ribbesford House would be worth £6.35 million. Restoration work began but the building proved to be in a worse condition than the brothers had expected. Their £1 million restoration budget had to be doubled to £2 million. In 2020 Samuel Leeds made an appeal for outside investors to help him finish the project. Footage filmed in August 2022 revealed that restoration work had temporarily halted. By March 2023 work had restarted. In October 2024 Leeds revealed that after multiple failed attempts at getting planning permission from the local council, he would not finish the project until planning permission was granted. Ribbesford House was listed for sale at auction on 5 November 2025. The guide price was £1.1 million. The property was listed for auction for a second time, taking place on 28 January 2026. The guide price was lowered to £900,000. Ribbesford House was sold in March 2026 for £450,000.

== See also ==
- Grade II* listed buildings in Wyre Forest
- Ribbesford village and civil parish
