= Charles Wilsonn =

English stationer, bookbinder and politician

Charles Edward Wilsonn (1752 – 14 February 1829) was an English stationer and bookbinder and Tory politician who sat in the House of Commons from 1814 to 1818.

== Family and early life ==
Wilsonn was born in 1752, the youngest son of Robert Wilsonn and his wife Jemima Bell, daughter of John Bell, haberdasher, of Colston Bassett. His father was a printer and stationer of Birchin Lane and Lombard Street, London, and receiver of duties on windows. He was baptised at St Mary's church, Stoke Newington, on 9 July 1752, to which parish the family had moved after the destruction of their home in Exchange Alley by fire in 1748. He was apprenticed to his father, and freed by redemption on 3 May 1774.

== Career ==
In 1775 Wilsonn went into partnership with his brother Richard in the bookbinding and stationery business. When his brother left the business in 1779, Wilsonn went into partnership with Charles Sinclaire. He also acted as deputy to his father as receiver of window duties.

In 1783 he was a Freeman of the Stationers Company, and he also joined the City of London Corporation as common councillor for the Langbourn ward, an office he retained until 1790. In October 1784 he wrote to William Pitt as "a sincere admirer of the present administration", offering to take on the receivership of the new window tax as efficiently "as I now do the old window tax account". He was given instead receivership of the commutation tax for Middlesex and also wheel carriage, servants, horses, waggons, carts, shops and assessed taxes. He gave evidence to the Privy Council on gold coin in 1788. In 1791 he was trading as a stationer on his own account and was in livery by 1792. In 1792 he wrote to the prime minister, begging him to preserve the gold standard. He was a member of the committee that sponsored the Enfield infantry in 1794. In 1795 he signed the London merchants' declaration of loyalty to Pitt's government. He was in various business ventures in the City of London, and was listed as an East India Company stockholder in 1795. For the loyalty loan of 1797, he subscribed £25,000 as a resident of Enfield and another £25,000 as a merchant at Change Alley. He was also a governor of Christ's Hospital. In 1803 he was a director of the Globe Insurance Company. One of his fellow directors was Miles Peter Andrews, with whom he was connected through the Pigou family.

Andrews was a Member of Parliament (MP) for Bewdley, and on his death in 1814 Wilsonn was elected MP for Bewdley. He did not contribute to debates and all his known votes were for the ministerial side. In 1816 and 1817 he opposed Catholic relief. He resigned the seat in 1818.

== Personal life ==
Wilsonn lived at Dome House at South Bersted, near Bognor, Sussex.

On 24 June 1774 he married Elizabeth Nixon (died 6 July 1835) of Lombard Street. They had no children. His nephew, Stephen George Comyn, became chaplain to Lord Nelson.

He died at Dome House on 14 February 1829, aged 77.

Parliament of Great Britain
Preceded by Miles Peter Andrews	Member of Parliament for Bewdley; 1814–1818	Succeeded by Wilson Aylesbury Roberts
