= William Augustus Miles =

English political writer

William Augustus Miles (c. 1753–1817) was an English political writer. He was also a British agent in the years around the French Revolution.

He is not to be confused with William Augustus Miles (1798–1851), penitentiary reformer.

== Early life ==
Born 1 July 1753 or 1754, he was son of Jefferson Miles, who was employed as proof-master general (died 1763), a supervisory artillery position. As a boy, he ran away from a school near Portsmouth, to support John Wilkes.

After travelling in America, Miles returned to England and was appointed in 1770 to the Ordnance Office. He lost the post shortly, by quarrelling with his superiors. Through David Garrick he obtained a civil appointment in the Royal Navy. He served under George Rodney in the West Indies during the American Revolutionary War, was in Newfoundland in 1779, and two years later was a French prisoner of war in St. Lucia. Soon after his release he left the service.

In August 1782 Miles was in Dublin, and was corresponding with Lord Temple just appointed Lord Lieutenant of Ireland; despite the backing of Lord Shelburne, he failed to obtain political employment. In early 1783 he went on the continent of Europe, to Seraing, near Liège, in order to economise and educate his daughter. He became intimate with two successive prince-bishops of Liège.

== Agent for Pitt ==
Miles made himself useful to William Pitt the younger, the Prime Minister. He was Pitt's first secret agent, from 1784. In the wartime conditions of 1794, Pitt broke off the relationship. Miles's position in the Low Countries placed him as a crossroads for intelligence, and also enabled contacts with French officials.

The events leading to the creation of the Republic of Liège saw Miles move to Brussels: he made a vain attempt in 1789 to persuade Pitt to interfere in those affairs. On 5 March 1790 he had an interview with Pitt, and in July was sent to Paris with a view to inducing the National Constituent Assembly to annul the third Pacte de Famille with Spain. In April 1791 he left Paris for London. Pitt offered him a pension for his past services, and he acted as intermediary between the agents of the French republic in London and the ministry, seeking to prevent war. Unable to obtain further employment from Pitt, he retired to Froyle in Hampshire.

== Later life ==
Miles returned to London early in 1800, but in 1803 retired to a house lent him by his friend Charles Sturt on Brownsea Island in Poole Harbour. On Pitt's death in 1806 he sought employment from the Ministry of All the Talents, and was promised the consul-generalship at Corfu; but the death of Charles James Fox intervened, and he turned to journalism. In July he obtained through Lord Moira an interview with the Prince of Wales, In 1812 he moved to Hythe, near Southampton, and corresponded with Samuel Whitbread, Lord Moira, and other public figures. On 23 April 1816 he started for Paris, in order to collect materials for a history of the French Revolution, and stayed a month at Chateau Lagrange with Lafayette.

Miles died in Paris on 25 April 1817. Lafayette attended his funeral.

== Associations ==
In Paris Miles came to know Mirabeau, Henri Lebrun, Lafayette (whom he had met in America), and other leading politicians. To Lebrun and Jean Henri Latude he gave financial support. Among his numerous friends were Horne Tooke, Sir Alexander Ball, Sir John Warren, Andrew Saunders, and Lord Rodney; and he corresponded at different times with Oliver Goldsmith, John Somers Cocks, and Henry James Pye. The Letters of "Neptune" gave William Makepeace Thackeray some hints for his Four Georges.

== Works ==
Miles as a political writer had influential Tory backers, such as Hugh Fortescue, 1st Earl Fortescue and George Nugent-Temple-Grenville, 1st Marquess of Buckingham. He wrote numerous pamphlets:

- Letters of Selim, on the abuses of the Ordnance Office.
- Letter to Sir John Fielding (1773), with a postscript to David Garrick, protesting against the suppression of The Beggar's Opera.
- Remarks on an Act of Parliament passed in Fifteenth Year of his Majesty's Reign, intituled "An Act for the Encouragement of the Fisheries carried on from Great Britain", (London, 1779).
- Cursory Reflections on Public Men and Public Measures, written at Aschaffenburg in 1789, and translated by Lebrun.
- On the Expediency and Justice of Prescribing Bounds to the Russian Empire (1791), in which a Suez Canal was suggested.
- The Conduct of France towards Great Britain Examined (1793).
- Letter to Earl Stanhope on his Political Conduct in reference to the French Revolution (London, 1794)
- Letter to the Duke of Graffton, in which Lafayette was defended against the charges made against him by Edmund Burke in the House of Commons.
- Letter to the Prince of Wales on the subject of the Debts contracted by him since 1787 (anonymous, 1795), which went through 13 editions. Lord Thurlow moved in the House of Lords for the disclosure of the author's name.
- Letter to H. Duncombe, Esq., Member for the County of York (1796), answer to Burke's Letter to a Noble Lord.
- Letter to the Earl of Wycombe on the Present State of Ireland (London, 1804).
- Letter to the Prince of Wales, with a Sketch of the Prospect before him, (London, 1808), Appendix and notes, answered by William Pettmann, writing under the pseudonym "Philopolites".

In 1784–5 Miles published in the Morning Post some letters (signed "Neptune" and "Gracchus") in support of Pitt's ministry, and against the Prince of Wales and his supporters. In the Independent Whig appeared his Letters of Neptune on parliamentary reform. He also wrote in favour of Francis Burdett's candidature for Westminster in 1807, and contributed to The Statesman.

Miles was also the author of two comic operas: Summer Amusements, or an Adventure at Margate, written with Miles Peter Andrews, and produced at the Haymarket Theatre in 1779, with music by Arnold; and The Artifice, in two acts, London, 1780, dedicated to Richard Brinsley Sheridan. Letters appeared in Authentic Correspondence with Lebrun, London, 1796, and Correspondence on the French Revolution, 1789–1817 (1890, edited by his son).

== Family ==
Miles married his first wife in 1772; she died in 1792, leaving a daughter Theodosia (b. 1773). In 1803 Miles married Harriet Watkinson of Bristol, who died at Monkwearmouth in 1872. By her he had five sons, of whom three entered the army:

- Robert Henry (lieutenant-colonel) accompanied M. de Lesseps on his tour of inspection before the opening of the Suez Canal for traffic, and died at Malta in 1867;
- Frederick Alexander, translated into Urdu William Pinnock's Catechism of Astronomy, commanded a battery in the Second Anglo-Sikh War, and died soon after his return to England; and
- Rawdon Muir (captain) was killed in the retreat from Kabul in January 1842.

The youngest son, Thomas Willoughby, was drowned in his boyhood. The fourth son, Charles Popham Miles (1810–1891), was a cleric. He edited the correspondence of his father in 1890, and published religious treatises and pamphlets on Scottish episcopacy.
