= Francis Winnington =

Francis Winnington may refer to:

- Francis Winnington (lawyer) (1634–1700), English lawyer and Solicitor-General to King Charles II
- Francis Winnington (Droitwich MP) (1704–c. 1754), English politician and barrister
- Sir Francis Winnington, 5th Baronet (1849–1931), English functionary
