= Charles Harrison (Bewdley MP) =

British businessman and politician

- Born: 1830
- Died: 11 May 1888 (aged 57–58)
- Occupations: businessman politician
- Spouse: Elizabeth Augusta Kempson (m. 1858)
- Parents: Benjamin Harrison (father); Hannah King (mother)

Charles Harrison (1830 – 11 May 1888) was a British businessman and Liberal politician.

He was the younger son of Benjamin Harrison of Liverpool and his wife, Hannah King of Stourbridge. Harrison entered business with Mr B Devey, a wharfinger at Stourport-on-Severn. Among the goods that were dealt with on the wharf were locally produced carpets of George Harris. On Harris's retirement Harrison purchased his carpet manufacturing business, and continued to actively run the company until shortly before his death.

Apart from his business activities, Harrison was a magistrate for Worcestershire and a member of the Stourport local board and a number of other institutions in the area. In 1874 he was invited to stand as Liberal candidate for the parliamentary borough of Bewdley in place of Augustus Anson who had retired from parliament. Harrison held the seat for the Liberals, defeating his Conservative opponent Stanley Leighton by 514 votes to 405. At the ensuing general election in 1880 Harrison was re-elected, defeating K E Webster by 598 votes to 530. However, Harrison was unseated on petition, and retired from parliamentary politics.

Harrison made his home at Areley Court, Areley Kings, near Stourport. He married Elizabeth Augusta Kempson of Edgbaston, Birmingham in 1858. He died at his home in May 1888 after a long illness.

Parliament of the United Kingdom
Preceded by Augustus Anson	Member for Bewdley; 1874–1880	Succeeded by Enoch Baldwin
