= Thomas Winnington =

Thomas Winnington may refer to:

- Thomas Winnington (1696–1746), English politician
- Sir Thomas Winnington, 3rd Baronet (c. 1780–1839), English politician
- Sir Thomas Winnington, 4th Baronet (1811–1872), English politician
