= Thomas James Ireland =

British politician

Member of Parliament for Bewdley
- In office 30 July 1847 – 20 March 1848
- Preceded by: Thomas Winnington
- Succeeded by: William Montagu

Personal details
- Born: 10 January 1792 London, England
- Died: 2 July 1863 (aged 71) London, England
- Party: Conservative
- Spouse: Elizabeth Welby (m. 1829)
- Education: Emmanuel College, Cambridge

Thomas James Ireland (10 January 1792 – 2 July 1863) was a British Conservative politician.

Born in London, Ireland was the only son of Thomas Ireland. He was admitted to Emmanuel College, Cambridge in Michaelmas of 1810, became a scholar there in 1811, and then graduated as a Bachelor of Arts in 1814, and a Master of Arts in 1817. In 1832, he was admitted to Gray's Inn.

Ireland married Elizbeth Welby, daughter of Sir William Earle Welby, 2nd Baronet and Wilhelmina née Spry in 1829, and they had at least six children.

Ireland was elected Conservative Member of Parliament (MP) for Bewdley at the 1847 general election, but he was unseated in March the next year for "bribery and corrupt treating".

He was also a Justice of the Peace and Deputy Lieutenant for Suffolk before his death in London in 1863. Ireland left five daughters as co-heirs to his estate, all of whom married well, most having families of their own.

Parliament of the United Kingdom
Preceded by Thomas Winnington	Member of Parliament for Bewdley; 1847–1848	Succeeded by William Montagu
