= Samuel Leeds =

British social media personality and businessman (born 1991)

- Born: Samuel Luke Leeds; 11 April 1991 (age 35)
- Education: Emmanuel School, Walsall
- Occupations: Social media influencer; property trainer; investor
- Spouse: Amanda Leeds
- Website: www.samuelleeds.com

Samuel Luke Leeds (born 11 April 1991) is a British social media influencer, property trainer and investor. In 2016 he founded a property education company that sells courses and mentoring in property investment. His marketing, course pricing and business practices have been the subject of media scrutiny and criticism, including an investigation in The Economist's 1843 Magazine and reporting by The Guardian and the BBC.

== Early life and career ==
Leeds attended Emmanuel School, a private Christian school in Walsall. He left school at 16.

Leeds claims to have bought his first property before the age of 18, taking out a mortgage in the name of a relative as he was too young to take one out himself.

Before his career in social media, Leeds worked as an illusionist.

In the 2010 United Kingdom general election he stood for election as a Christian Party candidate for Birmingham Selly Oak. He received a 0.3% share of the vote.

Leeds started his property education business in 2016. His brother, Russell Leeds, is the chief executive of the company.

In 2018 Leeds and his brother purchased Ribbesford House, a historic English mansion near Bewdley in Worcestershire for £810,000. Leeds claimed that when the project was completed, Ribbesford House could be worth more than £6.35 million. Restoration work began but the building proved to be in a worse condition than the brothers had expected. Their £1 million restoration budget had to be doubled to £2 million. In 2020 Samuel Leeds made an appeal for outside investors to help him finish the project. Footage filmed in August 2022 revealed that restoration work had temporarily halted. By March 2023 work had restarted. In October 2024 Leeds revealed that after multiple failed attempts at getting planning permission from the local council, he would not finish the project until planning permission was granted. Ribbesford House was listed for sale at auction on 5 November 2025. The guide price was £1.1 million. The property was listed for auction for a second time, taking place on 28 January 2026. The guide price was lowered to £900,000. Ribbesford House was sold in March 2026 for £450,000. in September 2026 interview with Metro, Leeds described the redevelopment as a poor investment and estimated that he had lost approximately £3.5 million on the project. He said he decided against completing the interior because he expected to incur further financial losses.

In 2023 Leeds and his brother launched Samuel Leeds Finance, a lending initiative offering funding for Samuel Leeds Academy members' projects.

In November 2023 Leeds and his brother paid £1,286,000 for Staden Grange, a hotel in Buxton in Derbyshire.

In 2024 Leeds and his brother reached a deal to rent Willingham House in Willingham in Cambridgeshire to run as an apartment hotel.

In October 2024, the Samuel Leeds Foundation funded the construction of a 64-bed orthopaedic ward at Jinja Regional Referral Hospital in Jinja, Uganda. The hospital's director said that the foundation had expressed interest in supporting the project in November 2022, with construction beginning in October 2023 following an agreement signed in August that year.

== Personal life ==
Leeds is married and has four children. He claims to have ADHD and dyslexia. Leeds is a supporter of Reform UK. He emigrated to Dubai to avoid paying "99.9 per cent of my taxes".

== Criticism and legal disputes ==
Leeds charges up to £12,000 for 12 months of coaching. His courses are not regulated by any professional body. The Daily Telegraph reported that some attendees used savings or loans to pay for courses and did not achieve the results they expected, while others reported successful deals.

In 2017, Leeds paid £4,800 for a meet-and-greet and photograph with Alan Sugar. In 2020, after Leeds had claimed that Sugar had mentored him, Sugar instructed his lawyers to have Leeds remove these claims from his social media and website, dismissing them as "pure fantasy and completely untrue".

In October 2019, Andrew Burgess started a Facebook group called The Truth about Samuel Leeds. In January 2021 Samuel Leeds launched legal proceedings seeking more than £6 million in damages against Burgess and several other members, alleging harassment and defamation. The Facebook group defendants crowd funded over £14,000 to help pay their legal costs. The case was struck out in the High Court by Mr Justice Nicklin in May 2024.

In January 2020, BBC News reported on the suicide of Danny Butcher, who had taken out loans to join Samuel Leeds' Academy. Butcher, who had struggled with mental health issues and debt, did not make the money that he thought he would from property investment. Leeds instructed Ellisons Solicitors to send a warning letter to Carrie Jones, Butcher's sister, accusing her of defamation and harassment. The letter referenced her contacting her MP about her brother's death. She denied any wrongdoing.

In May 2020, Samuel Leeds appeared on Joe Lycett's Got Your Back, a Channel 4 consumer affairs comedy programme. Lycett claimed that Leeds uses illegal pressure selling to convince attendees at his crash course to sign up for expensive paid courses.

In May 2021, Samuel Leeds launched legal proceedings against Property Tribes co-founder Vanessa Warwick. She also denied any wrongdoing and filed a counter-claim against Leeds for defamation and harassment. Supporters of Warwick crowd funded over £60,000 to support her legal costs. The case was eventually settled out of court.

In September 2022, The Guardian reported that Ellisons Solicitors, acting on behalf of Samuel Leeds, had issued legal threats or proceedings against at least 15 individuals or websites in response to criticism of his courses. Commentators raised concerns about the use of litigation to challenge online criticism. Leeds and Ellisons Solicitors were mentioned by name by in a parliamentary debate on strategic lawsuits against public participation by Rachel Gilmour MP.

In January 2026, Dan Neidle, a tax lawyer and former UK head of tax at Clifford Chance co-wrote an article on Leeds. Neidle and the other authors claimed that despite Leeds' assertion that he has superior tax knowledge to most accountants, he makes repeated, basic errors of understanding. The authors criticised Leeds' knowledge of stamp duty, property flipping, trusts, inheritance planning, holding UK property offshore, employing family members and tax deductible items. They claimed that it is unlikely that Leeds' course on property tax, for which he charges £995, contains any information that could not be found for free on the internet. In a March 2026 parliamentary debate on finance, Leeds' tax advice was condemned and Leeds was branded a "charlatan" and "con artist" by Stella Creasy MP.
