= Sir Francis Winnington, 5th Baronet =

English baronet

Sir Francis Winnington, Bt DL JP
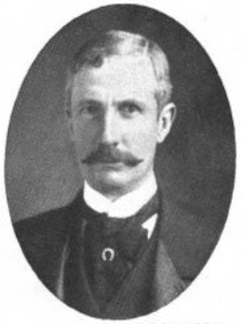

High Sheriff of Worcestershire
- In office 1894–1894
- Preceded by: Edward Vincent Vashon Wheeler
- Succeeded by: Henry Allen Wakeman Newport

Personal details
- Born: Francis Salwey Winnington; 24 September 1849
- Died: 4 March 1931 (aged 81) Hove, England
- Spouse: Jane Spencer-Churchill (m. 1879)
- Relations: Sir Thomas Winnington, 3rd Baronet (grandfather); Sir Compton Domvile, 1st Baronet (grandfather)
- Children: 5
- Parent(s): Sir Thomas Edward Winnington, 4th Baronet; Anna Helena Domvile

Sir Francis Salwey Winnington, 5th Baronet DL JP (24 September 1849 – 4 March 1931) was an English baronet.

== Early life ==
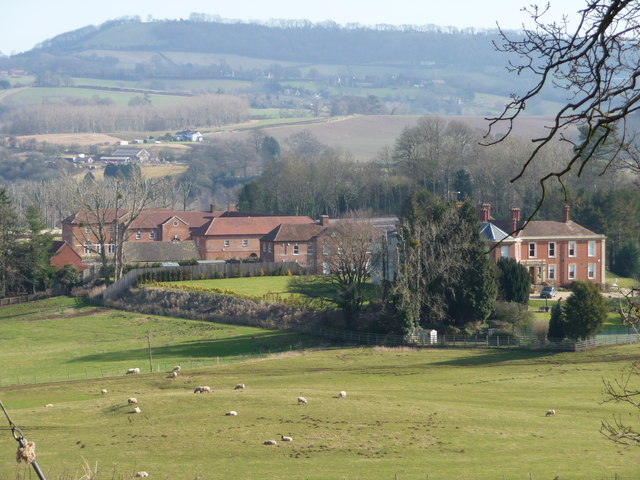
Stanford Court, Stanford-on-Teme

Winnington was born on 24 September 1849. He was the second, but only surviving, son of the former Anna Helena Domvile and Sir Thomas Edward Winnington, 4th Baronet of Stanford Court, Stanford-on-Teme, Worcestershire. His younger sister, Helena Caroline Winnington, married Hon. Frederick Hanbury-Tracy, MP for Montgomery.

His paternal grandparents were Joanna Taylor and Sir Thomas Winnington, 3rd Baronet. His maternal grandparents were Sir Compton Domvile, 1st Baronet (an Irish MP in the United Kingdom parliament and Governor of County Dublin) and Helena Sarah Trench (daughter of Frederick Trench MP for Maryborough). His cousin, The Right Reverend and Right Hon. Arthur Winnington-Ingram, was the Bishop of London, and another, Edward Winnington-Ingram, served as Archdeacon of Hereford.

== Career ==
Winnington succeeded as the 5th Baronet Winnington, of Stanford Court, on 18 June 1872 following the death of his father, who had served as MP for Bewdley.

He served as an ensign in the 66th Foot. He held the office of High Sheriff of Worcestershire in 1894, succeeding Edward Vincent Vashon Wheeler. Winnington's father had also served as High Sheriff in 1852. He held the office of Justice of the Peace for Worcestershire and the office of Deputy Lieutenant of Worcestershire.

== Personal life ==
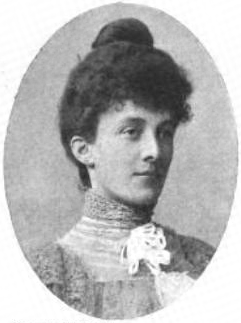
Jane Spencer-Churchill

On 5 February 1879, Winnington married Jane Spencer-Churchill (1858–1940) at the church of All Saints, Ennismore Gardens in London. Jane was the eldest daughter of Lord Alfred Spencer-Churchill and the Hon. Harriet Gough-Calthorpe. Her paternal grandparents were George Spencer-Churchill, 6th Duke of Marlborough and Lady Jane Stewart and her maternal grandparents were Frederick Gough, 4th Baron Calthorpe and Lady Charlotte Sophia Somerset (eldest daughter of Henry Somerset, 6th Duke of Beaufort), Together, they were the parents of:

- Frances Jane Winnington (1880–1953), who married Capt. Andrew Mansel Talbot Fletcher, a son of John Fletcher Fletcher, in 1902.
- Francis Salwey Winnington (1881–1913), a Lt. in the Coldstream Guards who married Blanche Emma Casberd-Boteler, daughter of Capt. William John Casberd-Boteler, in 1904.
- Charles Alfred Edward Winnington (1882–1968), who married Mary Margaret O'Connor, daughter of William O'Connor, in 1915. In 1929, he married Charlotte Ida Frederica Noel, daughter of Admiral Sir Gerard Noel.
- John Winston Foley Winnington (1883–1961), who married Gladys Cook, daughter of William Austin Cook, in 1910.
- Iris Harriet Helena Winnington (1887–1965), who married Lt. Robert Reginald Fairfax Wade-Palmer, son of Fairfax Blomfield Wade-Palmer, in 1909. They divorced in 1922, and she married Gerald Owen Weaver Joynson, son of Harold Mead Joynson, in 1925.

Sir Francis died in Hove on 4 March 1931. As his eldest son predeceased him in 1913, he was succeeded in the baronetcy by his grandson, Francis Salwey William Winnington (1907–2003).

=== Descendants ===
Through his son Francis, he was a great-grandfather of Sarah Rose Winnington (b. 1951), who married Anthony Noel, 6th Earl of Gainsborough and was a lady-in-waiting to Diana, Princess of Wales.

Honorary titles
Preceded by Edward Vincent Vashon Wheeler	High Sheriff of Worcestershire; 1894	Succeeded by Henry Allen Wakeman Newport
Baronetage of Great Britain
Preceded by Thomas Edward Winnington	Baronet (of Stanford Court); 1872–1931	Succeeded by Francis Salwey William Winnington
