= Sir Thomas Winnington, 4th Baronet =

English politician

Sir Thomas Winnington, Bt

Member of Parliament for Bewdley
- In office 1852–1868
- Preceded by: Viscount Mandeville
- Succeeded by: Sir Richard Atwood Glass
- In office 1837–1847
- Preceded by: Sir Thomas Winnington, Bt
- Succeeded by: Thomas James Ireland

High Sheriff of Worcestershire
- In office 1851–1852
- Preceded by: John Gregory Watkins
- Succeeded by: Sir Edmund Lechmere, Bt

Personal details
- Born: Thomas Edward Winnington; 11 November 1811
- Died: 18 June 1872 (aged 60)
- Party: Whig; Liberal
- Spouse: Helen Domvile
- Relations: Sir Edward Winnington, 2nd Baronet (grandfather)
- Parent(s): Sir Thomas Winnington, 3rd Baronet; Joanna Taylor
- Education: Eton College
- Alma mater: Christ Church, Oxford

Sir Thomas Edward Winnington, 4th Baronet (11 November 1811 – 18 June 1872) was an English Whig and Liberal politician.

== Early life ==
He was the eldest of three sons and four daughters of the former Joanna Taylor and Sir Thomas Winnington, 3rd Baronet, of Stanford Court, Stanford-on-Teme, Worcestershire. His paternal grandfather was Sir Edward Winnington, 2nd Baronet and his maternal grandfather was John Taylor of Moseley Hall in Worcester.

He was educated at Eton College before matriculating at Christ Church, Oxford.

== Career ==
He succeeded his father as a Member of Parliament for Bewdley, serving first from 1837 to 1847 and again from 1852 to 1868; and as High Sheriff of Worcestershire from 1851 to 1852.

Upon his father's death in September 1839, he inherited all of his father's property and succeeded to the baronetcy.

== Personal life ==
He married Helen Domvile, a daughter of Sir Compton Domvile, 1st Baronet and the former Helena Sarah Trench (a daughter of Frederick Trench, MP for Maryborough). Together, they were the parents of:

- Thomas Edward Winnington (b. 1848).
- Sir Francis Salwey Winnington (1849–1931), who married Jane Spencer-Churchill, a daughter of Lord Alfred Spencer-Churchill and granddaughter of George Spencer-Churchill, 6th Duke of Marlborough.
- Helena Caroline Winnington (1852–1916), who married Hon. Frederick Hanbury-Tracy, MP for Montgomery, a son of Thomas Hanbury-Tracy, 2nd Baron Sudeley, in 1870.

Upon his death on 18 June 1872, he was succeeded by their second son Francis, their eldest son having predeceased him without issue.

== Sources ==
- Leigh Rayment's list of baronets
- Leigh Rayment's Historical List of MPs

Parliament of the United Kingdom
Preceded by Sir Thomas Winnington, Bt	Member of Parliament for Bewdley; 1837–1847	Succeeded by Thomas James Ireland
Preceded by Viscount Mandeville	Member of Parliament for Bewdley; 1852–1868	Succeeded by Sir Richard Atwood Glass
Honorary titles
Preceded by John Gregory Watkins	High Sheriff of Worcestershire; 1851	Succeeded by Sir Edmund Lechmere
Baronetage of Great Britain
Preceded by Thomas Winnington	Baronet (of Stanford Court); 1839–1872	Succeeded by Francis Salwey Winnington
