= Edward Winnington =

Edward Winnington may refer to:

- Sir Edward Winnington, 1st Baronet (c.1728–1791)
- Sir Edward Winnington, 2nd Baronet (1749–1805)
