= Snead's Green =

Area of Droitwich Spa, Worcestershire, England

Coordinates: 52.3066°N 2.2051°W

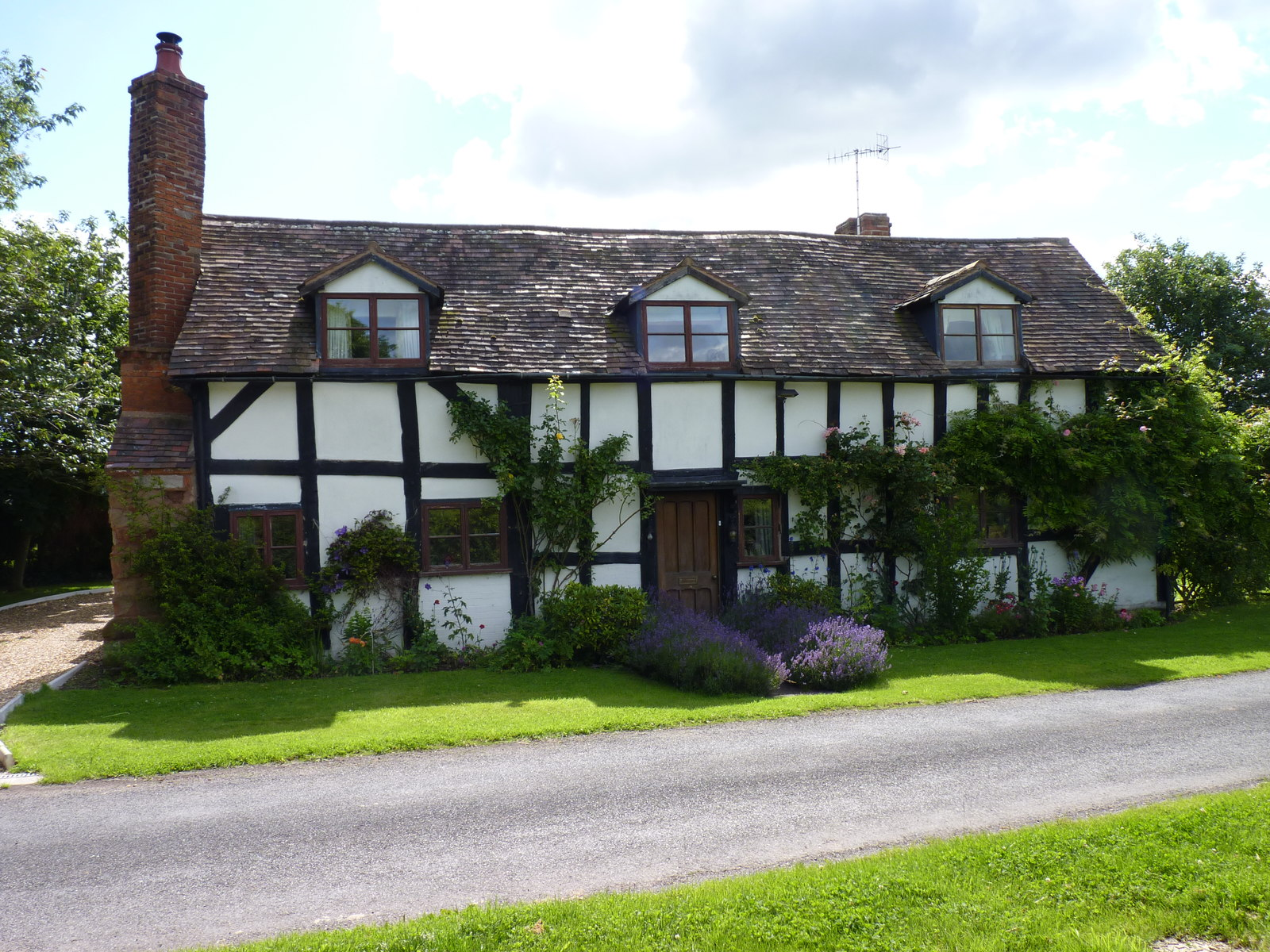
- Timber-framed cottage at Snead's Green, seen in July 2012

- Location within Worcestershire
- Population: (2001)
- OS grid reference: SO8667
  - London: 125m
- Civil parish: Droitwich Spa
- District: Wychavon
- Shire county: Worcestershire
- Region: West Midlands
- Country: England
- Sovereign state: United Kingdom
- Post town: DROITWICH
- Postcode district: WR9
- Dialling code: 01905
- Police: West Mercia
- Fire: Hereford and Worcester
- Ambulance: West Midlands
- UK Parliament: Mid Worcestershire

Snead's Green, sometimes written Sneads Green, is an area of Droitwich Spa, Worcestershire, England.

Francis Moule (born 1768), of Snead's Green House, bought the manorial rights from Lord Foley in 1805 and sold the manorial rights in 1809. The house had been owned by the Moule (or Moyle) family since 1621.

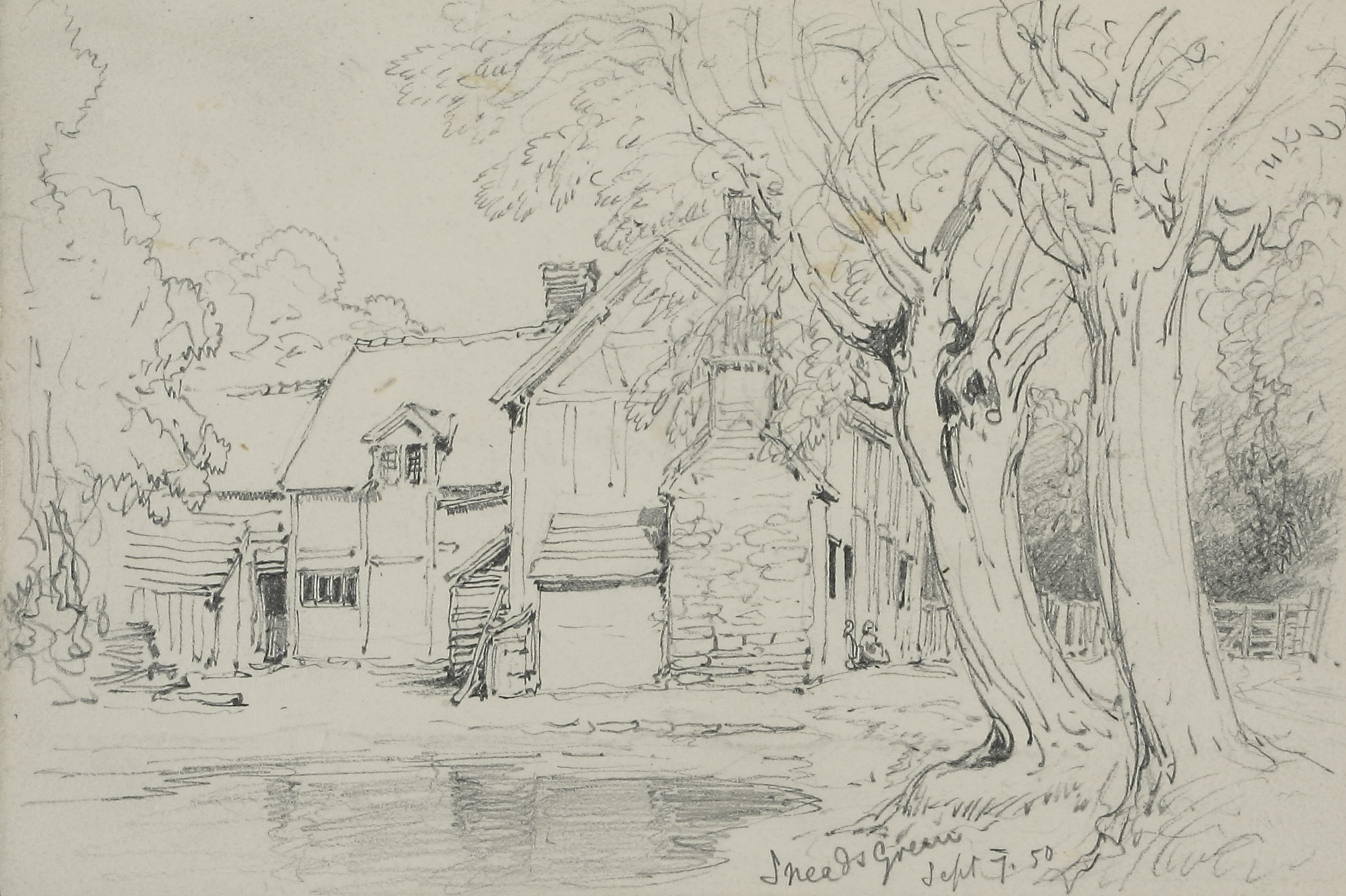
A drawing captioned "Snead's Green", made on 7 September 1850, by one of the Lines family of Birmingham
