= Ribbesford =

Village in Worcestershire, England

Coordinates: 52.35966°N 2.327342°W

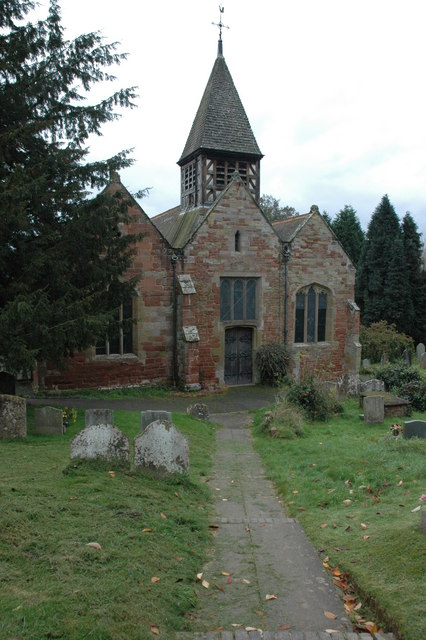
- The Church of St Leonard

- Location within Worcestershire
- Population: 332 (2021)
- OS grid reference: SO778735
- District: Wyre Forest
- Shire county: Worcestershire
- Region: West Midlands
- Country: England
- Sovereign state: United Kingdom
- Post town: BEWDLEY
- Postcode district: DY12
- Police: West Mercia
- Fire: Hereford and Worcester
- Ambulance: West Midlands
- UK Parliament: Wyre Forest

Ribbesford is a village in the Wyre Forest District of Worcestershire, England. It had a population of 332 in 2021.

Notable features of Ribbesford include the Church of St Leonard, a Grade I listed building and Ribbesford House, a Grade II* listed building.

== History ==
The name Ribbesford derives from the Old English ribbebeddford meaning 'ford by the bed of ribwort or houndstongue'.

Ribbesford was in the lower division of Doddingtree Hundred.

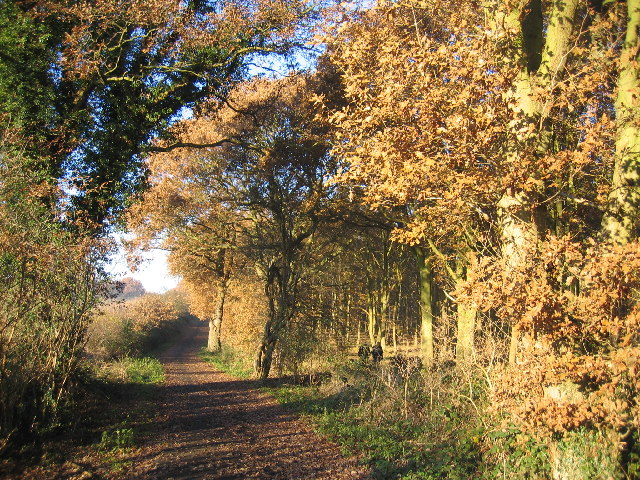

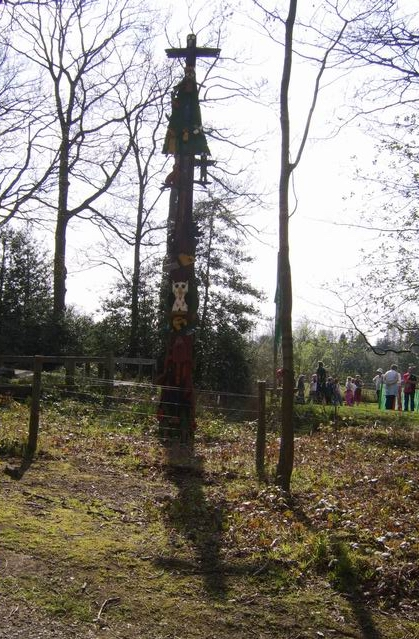
Totem pole, Wyre Forest

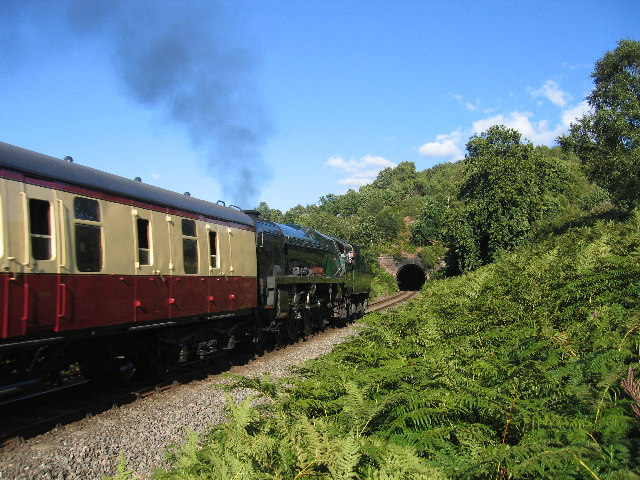
Bewdley tunnel
