= LTN =

LTN may refer to:

- Liberty Times, Taiwanese newspaper
- Luton Airport, England, IATA code
- Luton Airport Parkway station, England, by National Rail station code
- Low traffic neighbourhood, scheme of traffic calming in the UK
