= One-way traffic =

Traffic that moves in a single direction

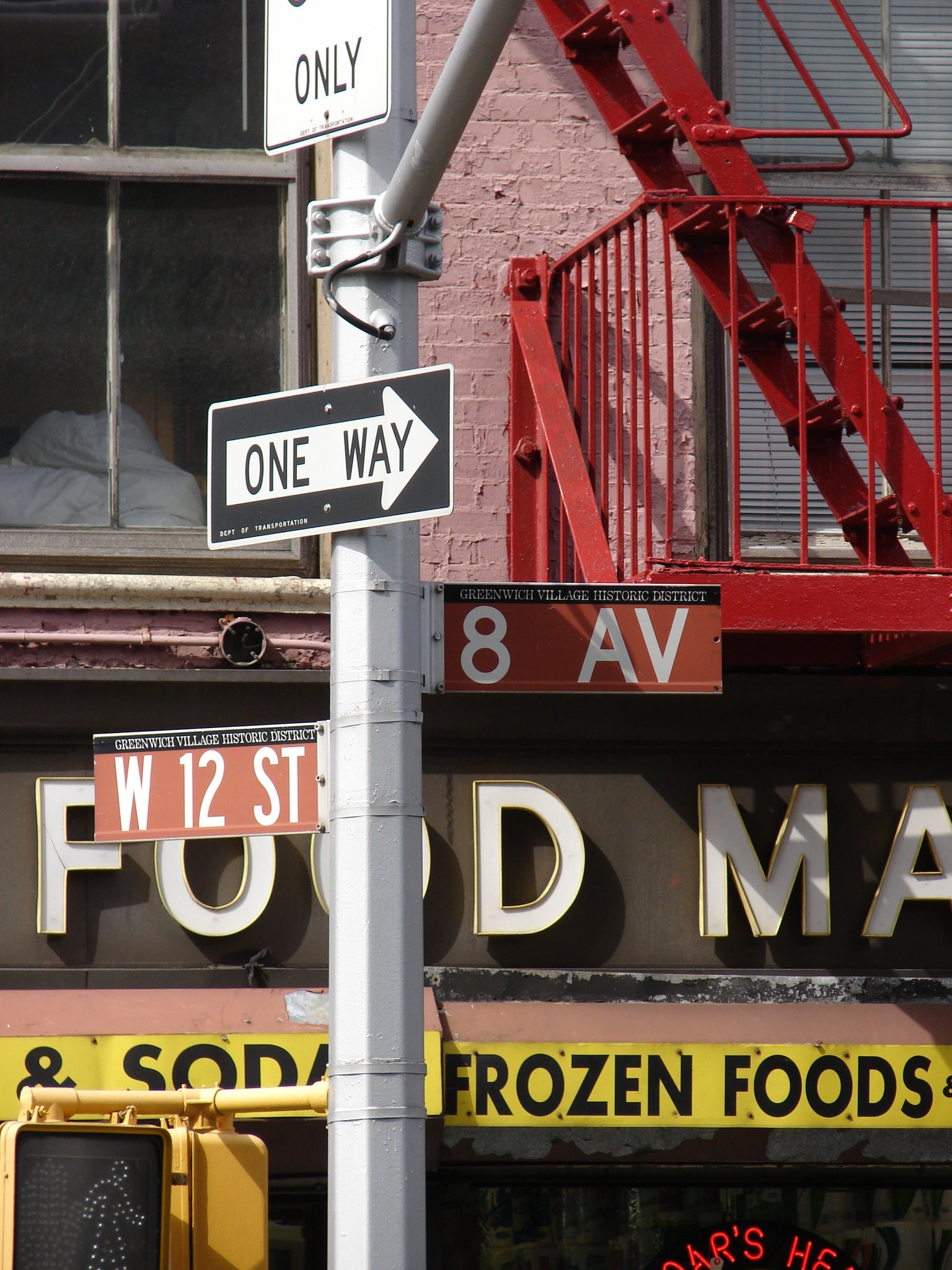
One-way street sign in New York City

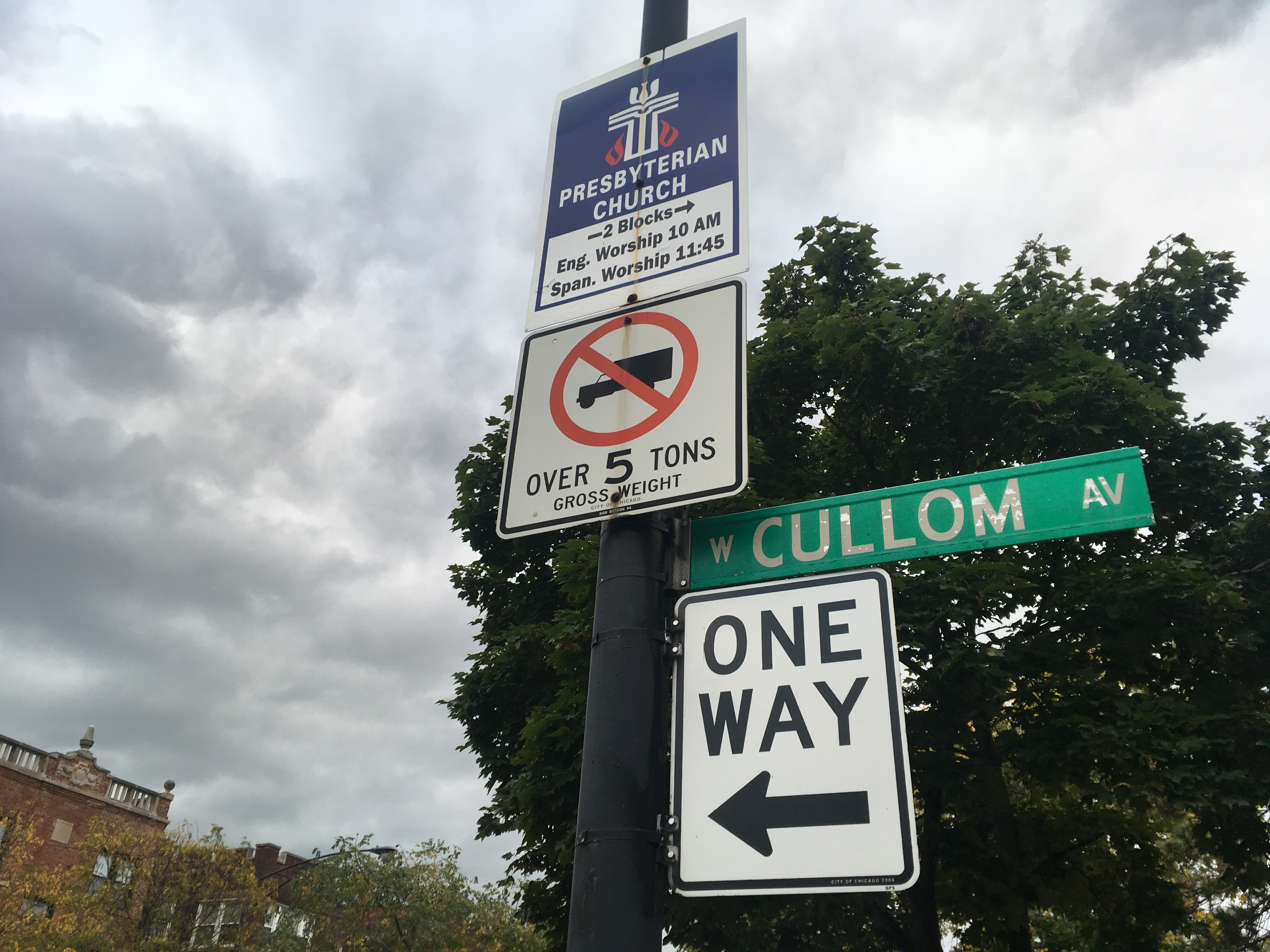
No trucks over 5 tons, nonstandard lettering Cullom Ave, One way signs in Chicago, Illinois

One-way traffic (or uni-directional traffic) is traffic that moves in a single direction. A one-way street is a street either facilitating only one-way traffic, or designed to direct vehicles to move in one direction. One-way streets typically result in higher traffic flow as drivers may avoid encountering oncoming traffic or turns through oncoming traffic. Residents may dislike one-way streets due to the circuitous route required to get to a specific destination, and the potential for higher speeds adversely affecting pedestrian safety. Some studies even challenge the original motivation for one-way streets, in that the circuitous routes negate the claimed higher speeds.

== Signage ==
=== General signs ===
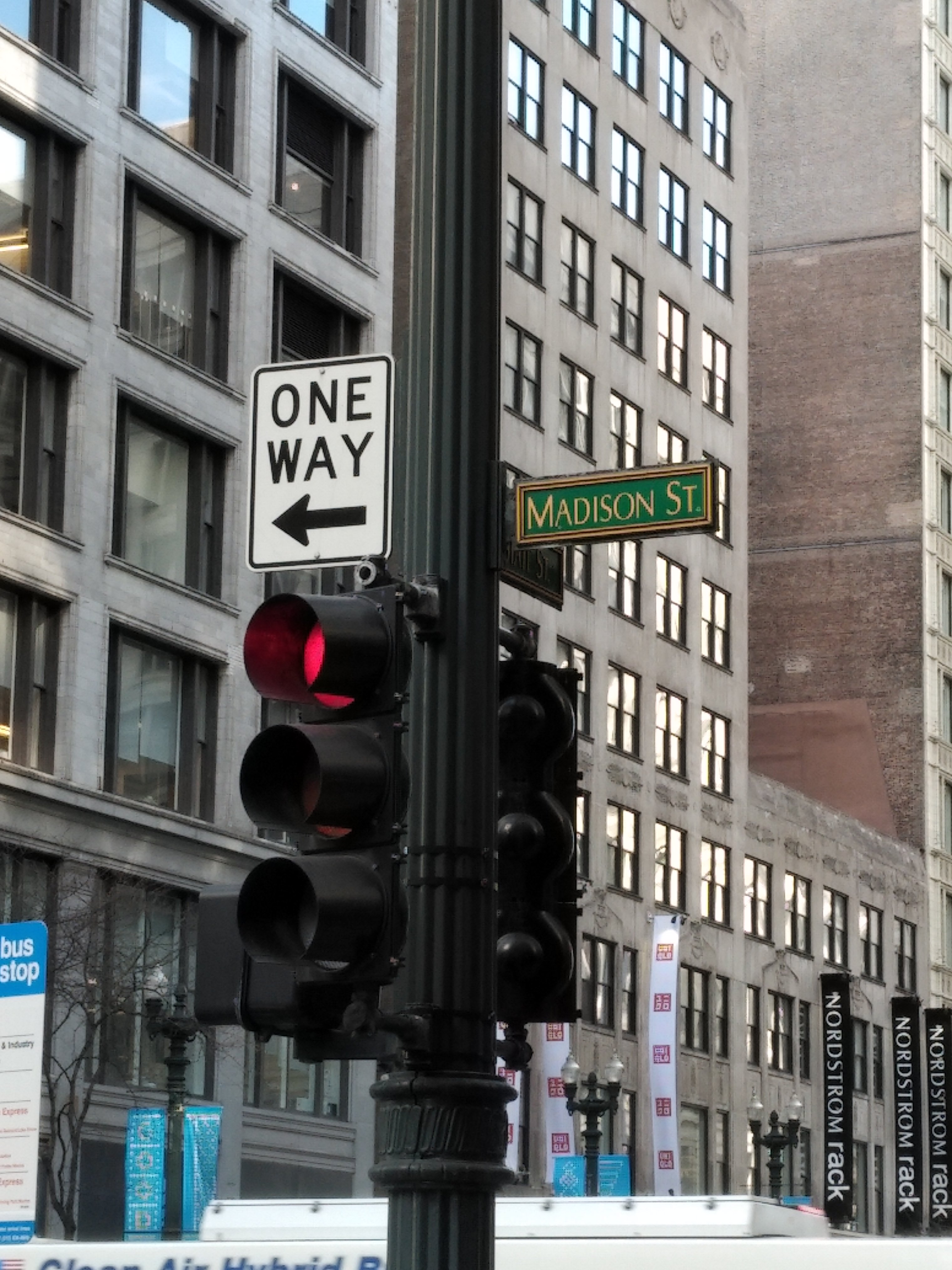
Another style of one-way sign, located in Chicago

Signs are posted showing which direction the vehicles can move in: commonly an upward arrow, or on a T junction where the main road is one-way, an arrow to the left or right. At the end of the street through which vehicles may not enter, a prohibitory traffic sign "Do Not Enter", "Wrong Way", or "No Entry" sign is posted, e.g. with that text, or a round red sign with a white horizontal bar. Sometimes one portion of a street is one-way, another portion two-way. An advantage of one-way streets is that drivers do not have to watch for vehicles coming in the opposite direction on this type of street.

A number of European countries, including Russia and post-Soviet states, use one-way rectangular road signs with a white arrow on a blue background. In Russia and post-Soviet countries, such signs are called as "Exit to a one-way road" (Russian: Выезд на дорогу с односторонним движением) and are placed in front of an intersection, often in combination with a Yield sign or Priority road sign.

Rectangular one-way traffic signs in different countries of the world may have such inscriptions inside the arrow:

- Austria uses EINBAHN;
- Denmark uses Ensrettet;
- Germany uses Einbahnstraße;
- Jordan uses اتجاه واحد;
- Luxembourg uses Sens unique;
- Romania and Moldova use SENS UNIC;
- Some Spanish-speaking countries in the Americas use UNA VIA;
- Thailand uses เดินรถทางเดียว;
- Turkey uses TEK YÖN;

In Russia and post-Soviet countries, the "End of one-way traffic" (Russian: Конец дороги с односторонним движением) sign is used to indicate the end of a one-way road. This sign shows a big white arrow crossed out by a red diagonal line on a blue background. Such sign in this form is not found anywhere else in Europe and Asia.

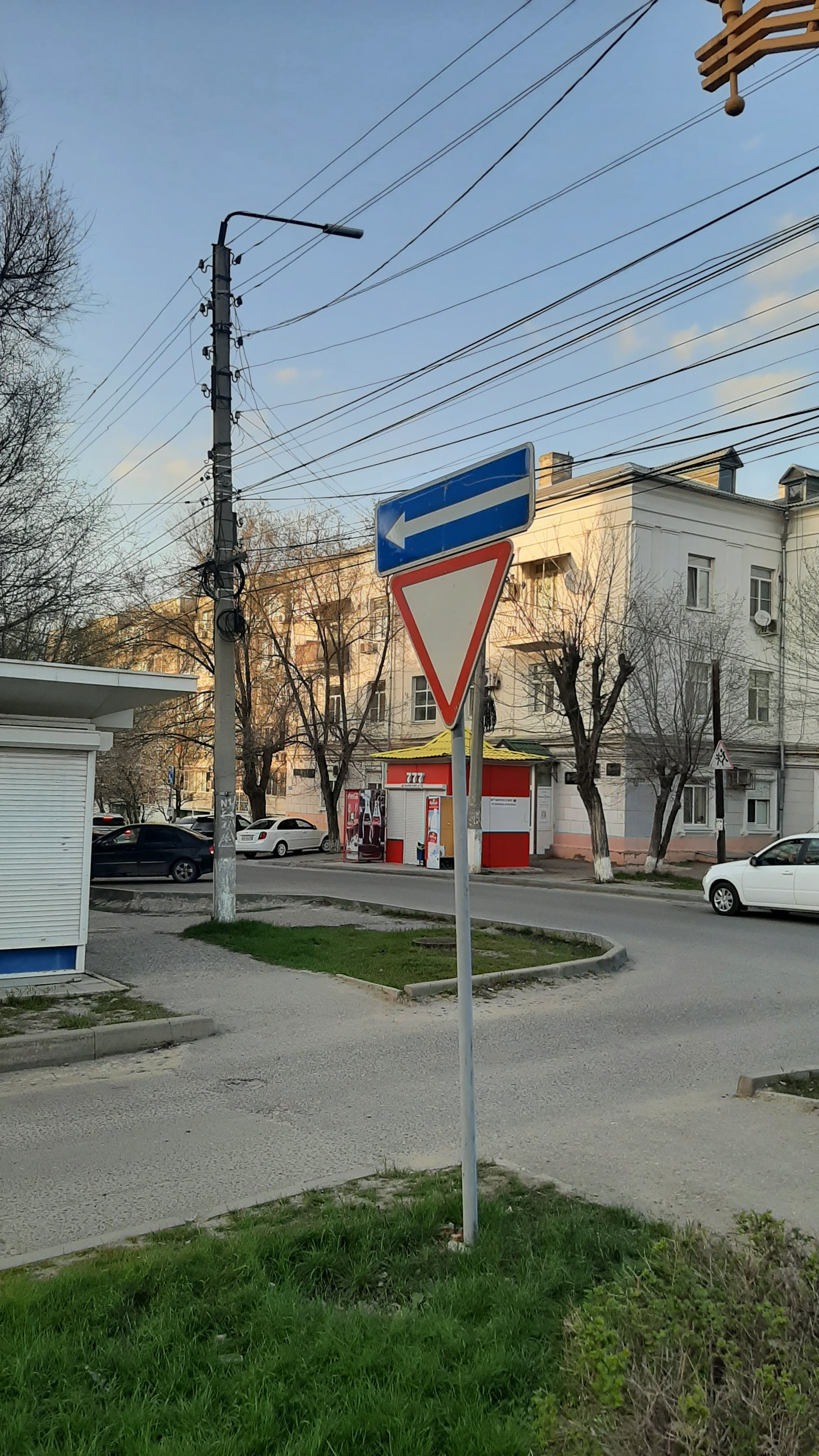
Road signs "Give way" and "Exit to a one-way road" at the exit to Gubarevicha Street in Elista, Russia.

=== No entry signs ===
The abstract "No Entry" sign was officially adopted for standardization at the League of Nations convention in Geneva in 1931. The sign was adapted from Swiss usage, derived from the practice of former European states that marked their boundaries with their formal shield symbols. Restrictions on entry were indicated by tying a blood-red ribbon horizontally around the shield. The sign is also known as C1, from its definition in the Vienna Convention on Road Signs and Signals.

The European "No Entry" sign was adopted into North American uniform signage in the late 1960s / 1970s, replacing a previous white square sign bearing only the English text in black "Do Not Enter". In addition to the standardized graphic symbol, the US version still retains the wording "Do Not Enter", while the European and Canadian versions typically have no text.

Since Unicode 5.2, the Miscellaneous Symbols block contains the character U+26D4 ⛔ NO ENTRY, representable in html as &#x26d4; or &#9940;.

=== Gallery ===
One-way sign used in South Africa, Botswana, Eswatini, Namibia, Lesotho, and Tanzania

One-way sign used in Croatia, BiH, Serbia, Montenegro and Slovenia

The contemporary Australian one way sign is vertically oriented, but older signs similar to those used in North America are still common.

One-way road sign used in Russia and post-Soviet states

Sign used in Russia and post-Soviet states (except Lithuania) to indicate end of one-way traffic

Sign used in Lithuania to indicate end of one-way traffic

"No entry" signs are often placed at the exit ends of one-way streets

A Swedish one-way sign used on T junctions

Some countries, like Germany, show text on one-way signs (Einbahnstraße means "one-way street")

Canada

Sign "Una via" used in Latin American countries (e.g. Ecuador)

One-way road sign used in US

One-way road sign used in US (alt)

"No entry" signs are often placed at the exit ends of one-way streets (US)

New Zealand and Fiji one way road sign

New Zealand and Fiji no entry sign

UK one-way sign

UK no entry sign

Brazil no entry sign

== Applications ==
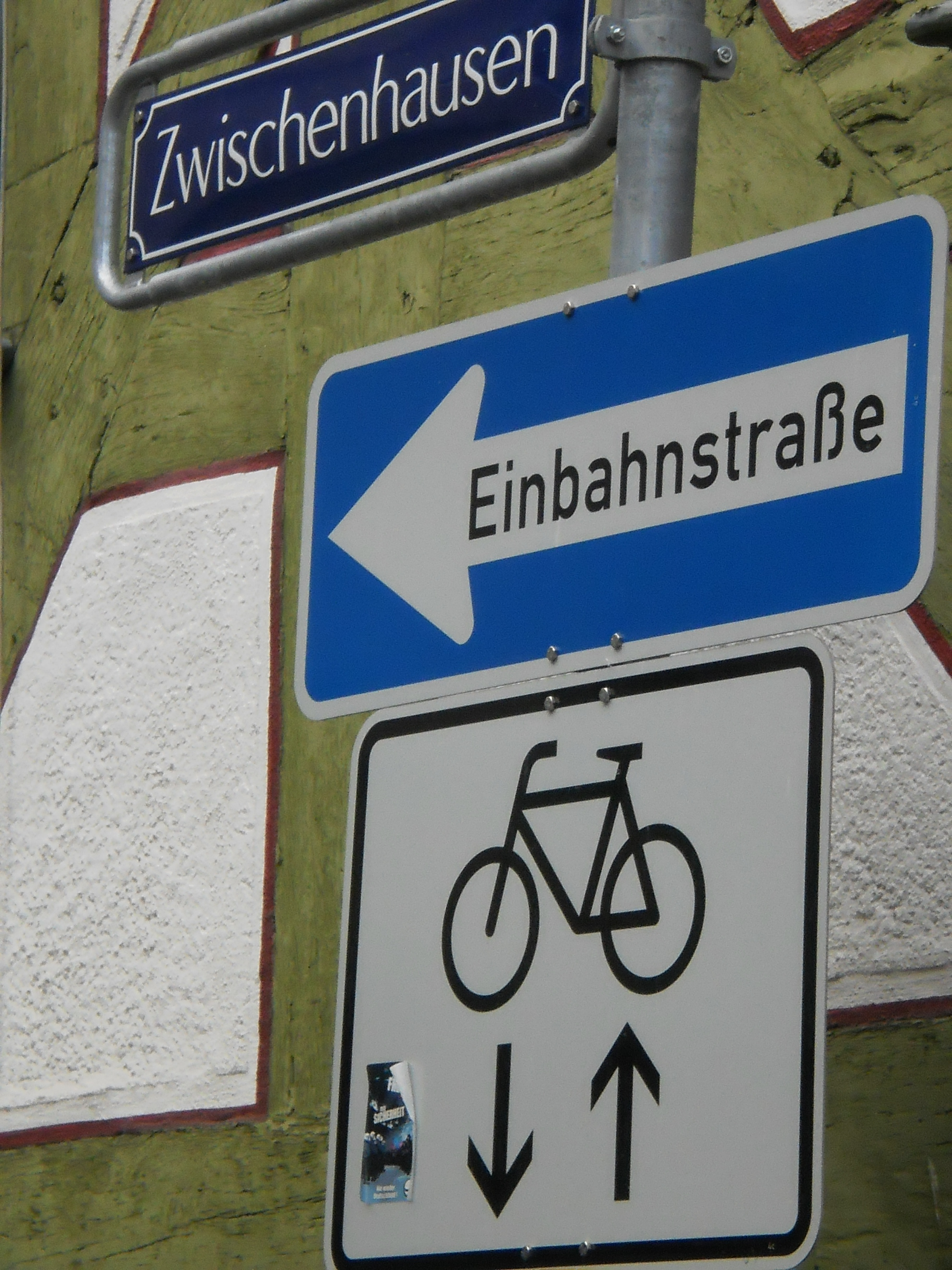
Opened One-way street for cyclists as part of cycling infrastructure (Germany)

One-way streets may be part of a one-way system, which facilitates a smoother flow of motor traffic through, for example, a city center grid; as in the case of Bangalore, India. This is achieved by arranging one-way streets that cross in such a fashion as to eliminate right turns (for driving on left) or left turns (for driving on right). Traffic light systems at such junctions may be simpler and may be coordinated to produce a green wave.

Some of the reasons one-way traffic is specified:

- The street is too narrow for movement in both directions and the road users unable to coordinate easily
- Prevent drivers from cutting through residential streets to bypass traffic lights or other requirements to stop (a so-called "rat run")
- Discourage drivers from cruising through a residential neighborhood (e.g. by having mostly one-way streets pointing outwards, with relatively few vehicular entrances)
- Part of a one-way pair of two parallel one-way streets in opposite directions (such as a divided highway)
- For a proper functioning of a system of paid parking or other restricted vehicular access (these may also use one-way treadles which puncture tires if traversed in the forbidden direction)
- To calm traffic, especially in historic city centers
- Eliminate turns that involve crossing in front of oncoming traffic
- Increase traffic flow and potentially reduce traffic congestion
- Add an additional parking lane in a former two-way street, formerly with parking on one side only. (Commonly found in Malta)
- Eliminate the need for a center turn lane that can instead be used for travel
- Better traffic flow in densely built-up areas where road widening may not be feasible
- Simplify pedestrian crossing of the street due to walkers only needing to look for oncoming traffic in one direction
- Eliminate cars' driver-side doors opening into the travel lane in parallel parking spaces for parking lanes located on the left (right-hand drive) or right (left-hand drive) side of a street
- Locate a one-way bike lane on the opposite side of the street from parallel parking spaces to prevent dooring
- Limited-access highway entrance and exit ramps.

=== Couplets ===
Successful one-way streets typically have "couplets" within close distance. This creates a pair of streets with similar design features to balance travels in both directions. However, it can create a problem if one street in the pair is a major traffic generator, which will create an imbalance.

=== Disadvantages ===
One-way street system increases trip length required to reach desired destination.

Without one-way street system

With one-way street system

One-way street systems often result in an increase in the trip length due to extra turns must be made before reaching the destination. Another major impact is to transit routing. Bus routes must split onto two separate streets, adding to confusion and walking distances. Business owners often object to building one-way streets too, fearing a decline in the business due to changing circulation patterns, though most studies show one way streets in commercial area result in an enhanced economic activity.

== Left turn on red ==
In the United States, 37 states and Puerto Rico allow left turns on red only if both the origin and destination streets are one way. See South Carolina law Section 56-5-970 C3, for example. Five other states – Alaska, Idaho, Michigan, Oregon, and Washington – also allow left turns on red into a one-way street from a two-way street.

== History ==
An attempt was apparently made in 1617 to introduce one-way streets in alleys near the River Thames in London by The Worshipful Company of Carmen who were commissioned by the King to regulate traffic in the square mile of the City of London. The next one-way street in London was Albemarle Street in Mayfair, the location of the Royal Institution. It was so designated in 1800 because the public science lectures were so popular there. The first one-way streets in Paris were the Place Charles de Gaulle around the Arc de Triomphe, the Rue de Mogador and the Rue de la Chaussée-d'Antin, created on 13 December 1909.

According to the folklore of Eugene, Oregon, the use of one-way streets in the United States started in Eugene itself. In 1941 6th Ave was converted into a one-way avenue by the Highway Department. Other sources claim the fad arose in relation to the disaster of the SS Morro Castle. On 9 September 1934, the on-fire SS Morro Castle was towed to the New Jersey shoreline near the Asbury Park Convention Center and the sightseeing traffic was enormous. The Asbury Park Police Chief decided to make the Ocean Avenue one-way going north and the street one block over (Kingsley) in one-way going south, creating a circular route. By the 1950s this "cruising the circuit" became a draw to the area in itself since teens would drive around it looking to hook up with other teens. The circuit was in place until the streets went back to two way in 2007 due to new housing and retail development.

== One-way traffic of pedestrians ==
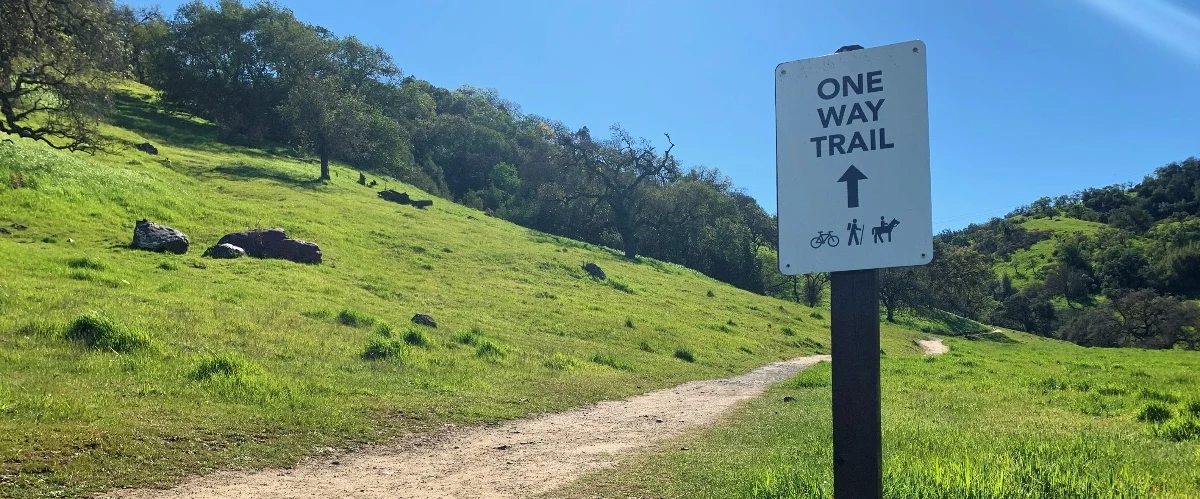
A one-way trail sign in a California nature preserve applies to all trail users, including equestrians, hikers, and mountain bikers. The restriction was originally implemented as a social distancing measure during the COVID-19 pandemic but persisted for crowd control.

Sometimes one-way walking is specified for smooth pedestrian traffic flow, or in the case of entrance checks (such as ticket checks) and exit checks (e.g. the check-out in a shop). They may be outdoors (e.g. an extra exit of a zoo), or in a building, or in a vehicle (e.g. a tram). In addition to signs, there may be various forms and levels of enforcement, such as:

- personnel; sometimes a "soft" traffic control system is supported by vigilant staff monitoring
- a turnstile; however, turnstile jumping is possible
- a High Entrance/Exit Turnstile (HEET)
- a one-way revolving door
- an escalator; however, the escalator can be traversed in opposite direction, by walking up or down the stairs faster than it moves
- an elevator that can only be called from one floor; this is common in IKEA stores.
- Two-way elevators: passengers enter from the front on one floor and exit from the back in another floor. This is common in two-level Target stores.
- a door or gate that can only be opened from one side (a manual or electric lock, or simply a door that is pushed open and has no doorknob on the other side), or which automatically opens from one side. (However, with help from someone on the other side, it may often be bypassed in the reverse direction.)
  - entrance of a shop
  - an emergency exit, which may activate an alarm
- Airports - (e.g. passport control, customs, baggage security)

Sometimes a door or gate can be opened freely from one side, and only with a key or by inserting a coin from the other side (house door, door with a coin slot, e.g. giving entrance to a pay toilet). The latter can be passed without paying when somebody else leaves, and by multiple persons if only one pays (as opposed to a coin-operated turnstile).

== See also ==
⛔o

One-way traffic
- In Unicode: U+26D4 ⛔ NO ENTRY

Different from
- Different from: U+2296 ⊖ CIRCLED MINUS; U+229D ⊝ CIRCLED DASH

- Circulation plan
- Glossary of road transport terms
