= Circulation plan =

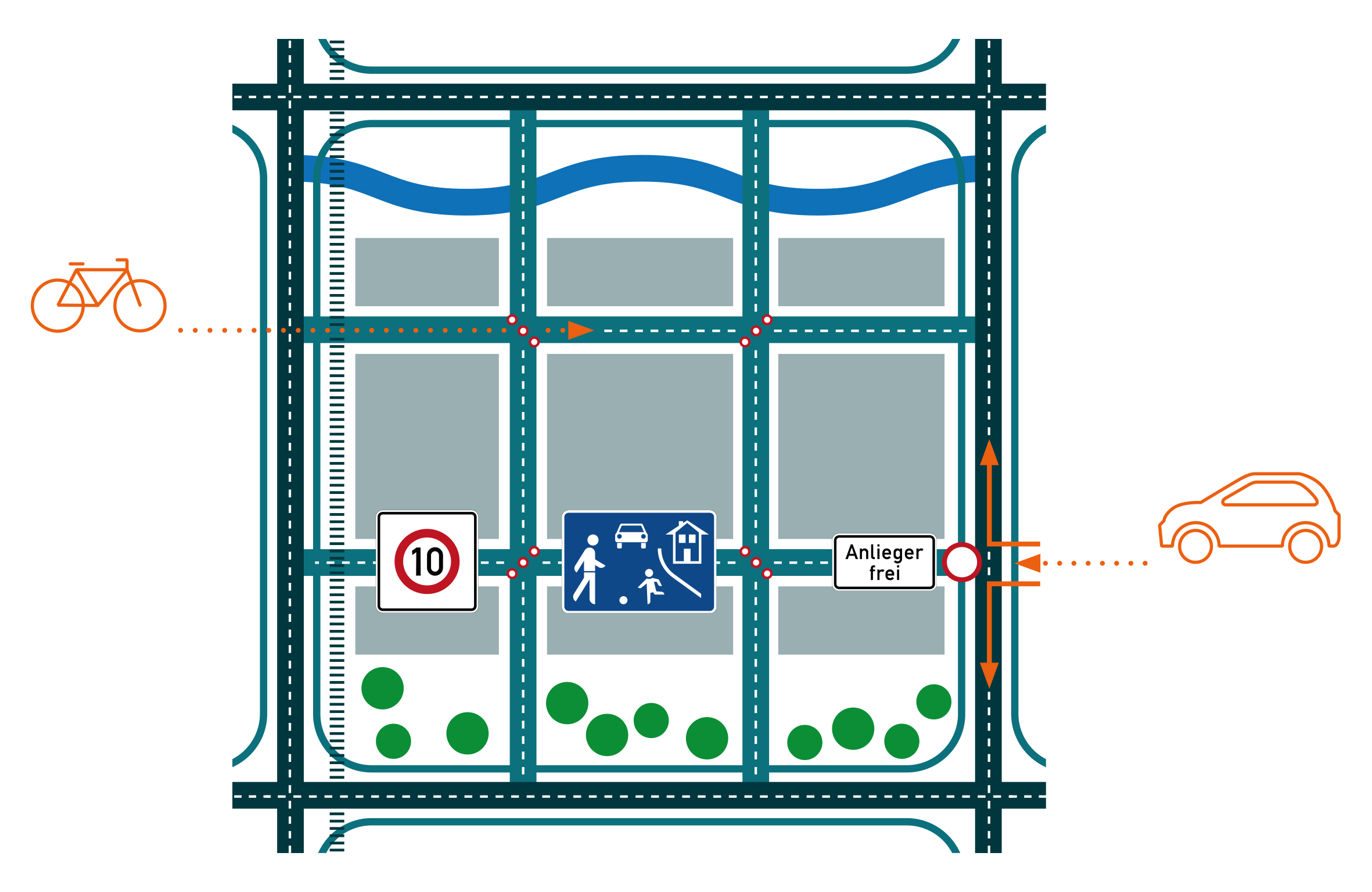
Visualization of the principle behind a circulation plan: Motorists have access to ring roads to travel longer distances, while cyclists and pedestrians have more permeable access

A circulation plan is a schematic empirical projection/model of how people and/or vehicles flow through a given area.

== Types ==
Circulation plans are used by i.e. by city planners and other officials (such as county planning officials, ...) to manage and monitor traffic and pedestrian patterns in such a way that they might discover how to make future improvements to the system.

New multi-family residential developments, for example, introduce increased volume (and thus density) of traffic flows into their vicinity. City planners might analyze this projected impact and justify charging higher impact fees. In other cases, local residents lobbying against a new development might use circulation plans to justify the denial of a development's building permit, citing decreased quality due to overcrowding, noise pollution, traffic, and so on.

City planners might use main thoroughfares and so on to draw commuter traffic out of local neighborhoods (where excessive traffic is seen by local voters as undesirable) and onto larger roads, which often utilize considerable buffers like setback land and vegetation to divorce non-local (commuter) traffic from local (neighborhood) traffic.

The planning for internal circulation of people is also important in buildings. Signage can help with wayfinding and should be located at decision points and perpendicular to the path of travel.

== Methods ==
Circulation plans for cities can introduce modal filters, one-way streets and pedestrian areas.

== Examples ==
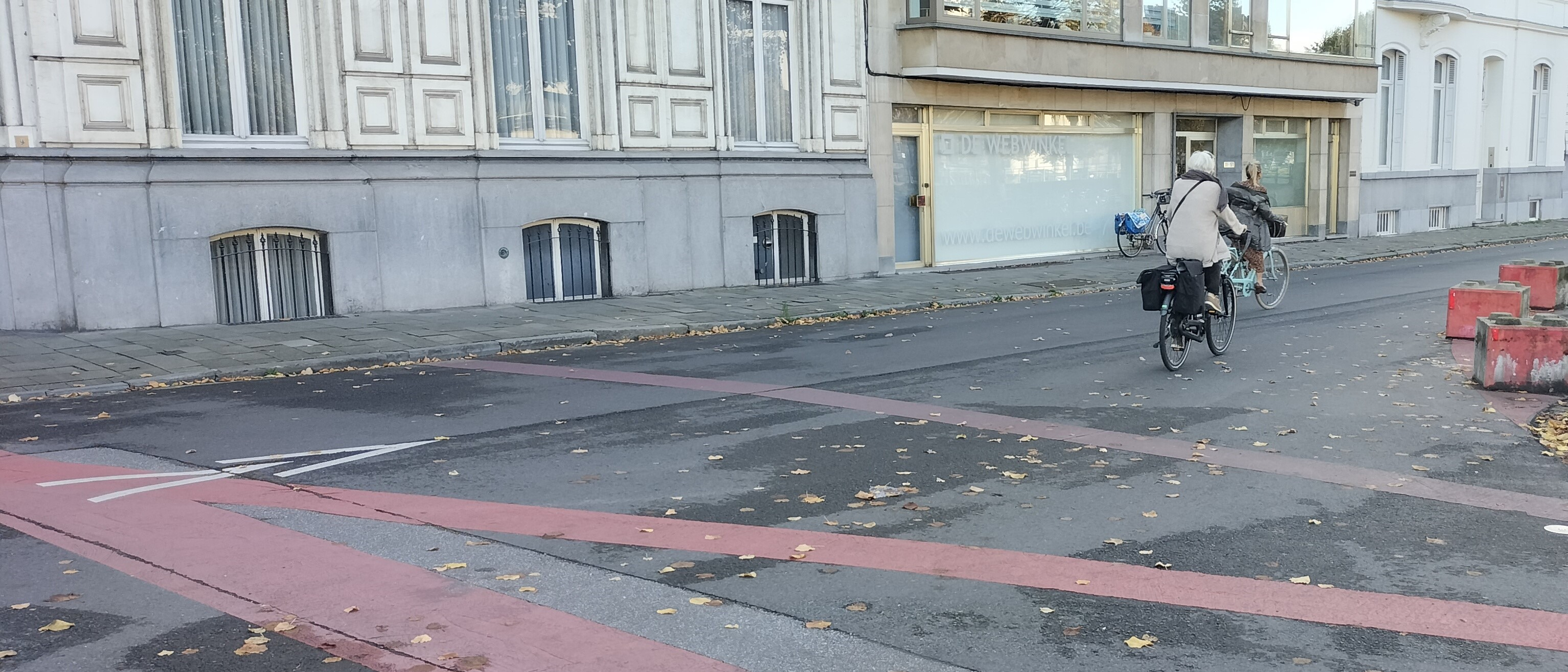
Modal filter in Ghent using road markings and cameras

In Ghent, Belgium, in different stages (1997, 2017) circulation plans have been initiated. Large parts of the city center have become car-free. 6 areas around the center are not connected anymore directly for motorized vehicles, that has to take a detour using the R40 ring road. The car circulation in these areas is limited to certain circuits: two-way streets have been converted to one-way streets. The space that has thus become available is used by increased bicycle and pedestrian usage. The transition to carfree has significantly reduced traffic congestion and increased the use of other modes of transport, such as bikes and public transportation. Sections exist where cars can drive as well as sections that are car-free. In some sections, public transport, taxis and permit holders may enter but they may not exceed 20 km/h. After the circulation plan of 1997, a parking route existed around the car-free city center, employing a parking guidance system to ensure access to all parts of the city and underground parking garages, but after the circulation plan of 2017 car circulation on this route is not possible anymore, and displaced towards the larger R40 ring road.

== See also ==
- City planning, process of developing and designing land use and the built environment
- One-way traffic, traffic that moves in a single direction
- Urban planning, technical and political process concerned with the use of land and design of the urban environment
