= Modal filter =

Road design that restricts the passage of certain types of vehicle

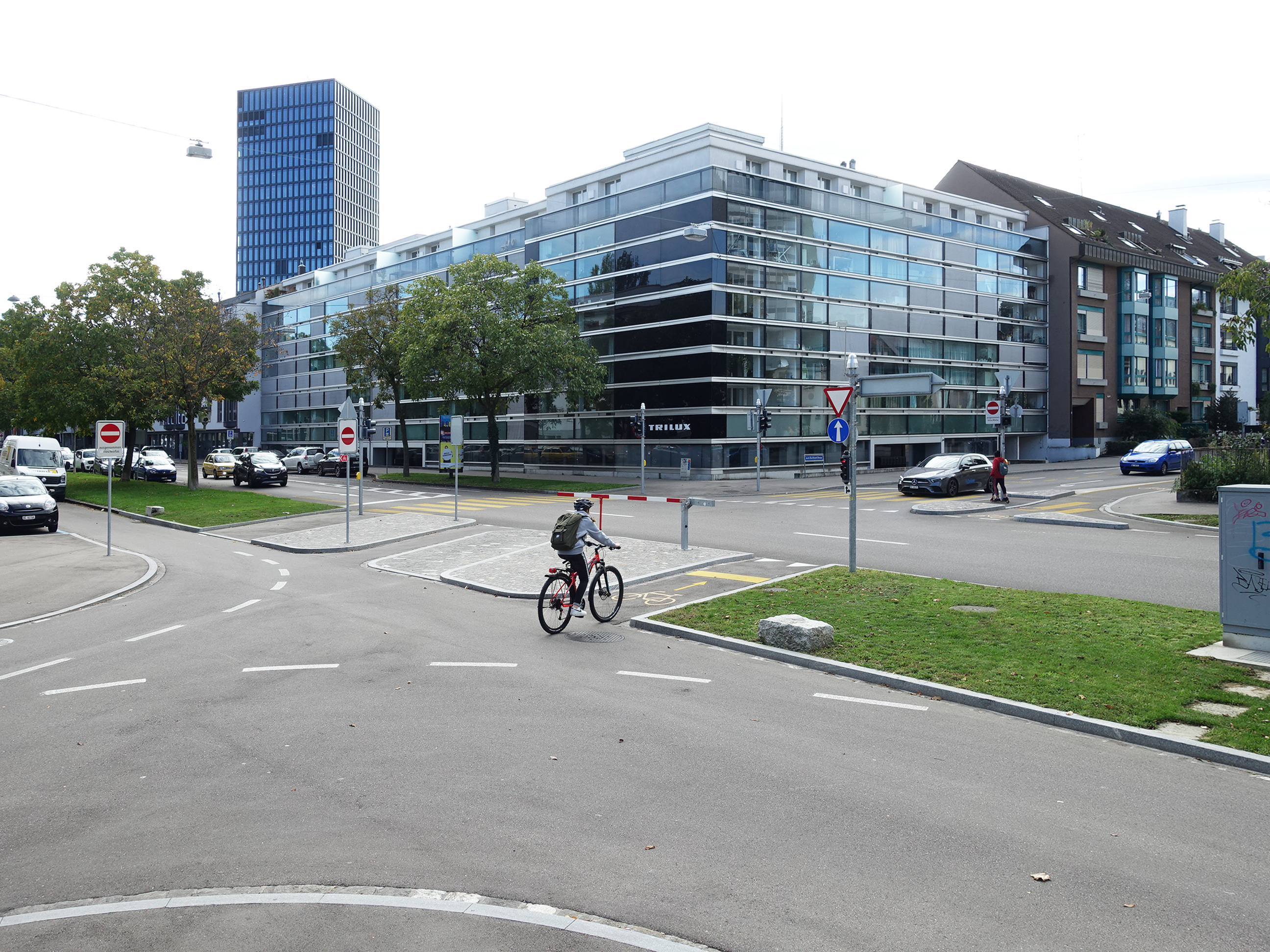
A modal filter in Basel, Switzerland

A modal filter, sometimes referred to as a point closure, is a road design that restricts the passage of certain types of vehicle in road transport. Modal filtering is often used to help create a low traffic neighbourhood (LTN), where motor traffic is diverted away from residential streets and instead toward feeder roads. Modal filters can be used to achieve filtered permeability within a transport network, and can encourage walking and cycling through more pleasant environments and improved safety.

Modal filters can be implemented through the use of barriers such as bollards, boom barriers and planters, though filters can also be implemented virtually through the use of automatic number-plate recognition cameras and road signs, which can allow residential motor access while prohibiting passing motor traffic.

Modal filters are often the result of circulation plans by local governments.

== Gallery ==
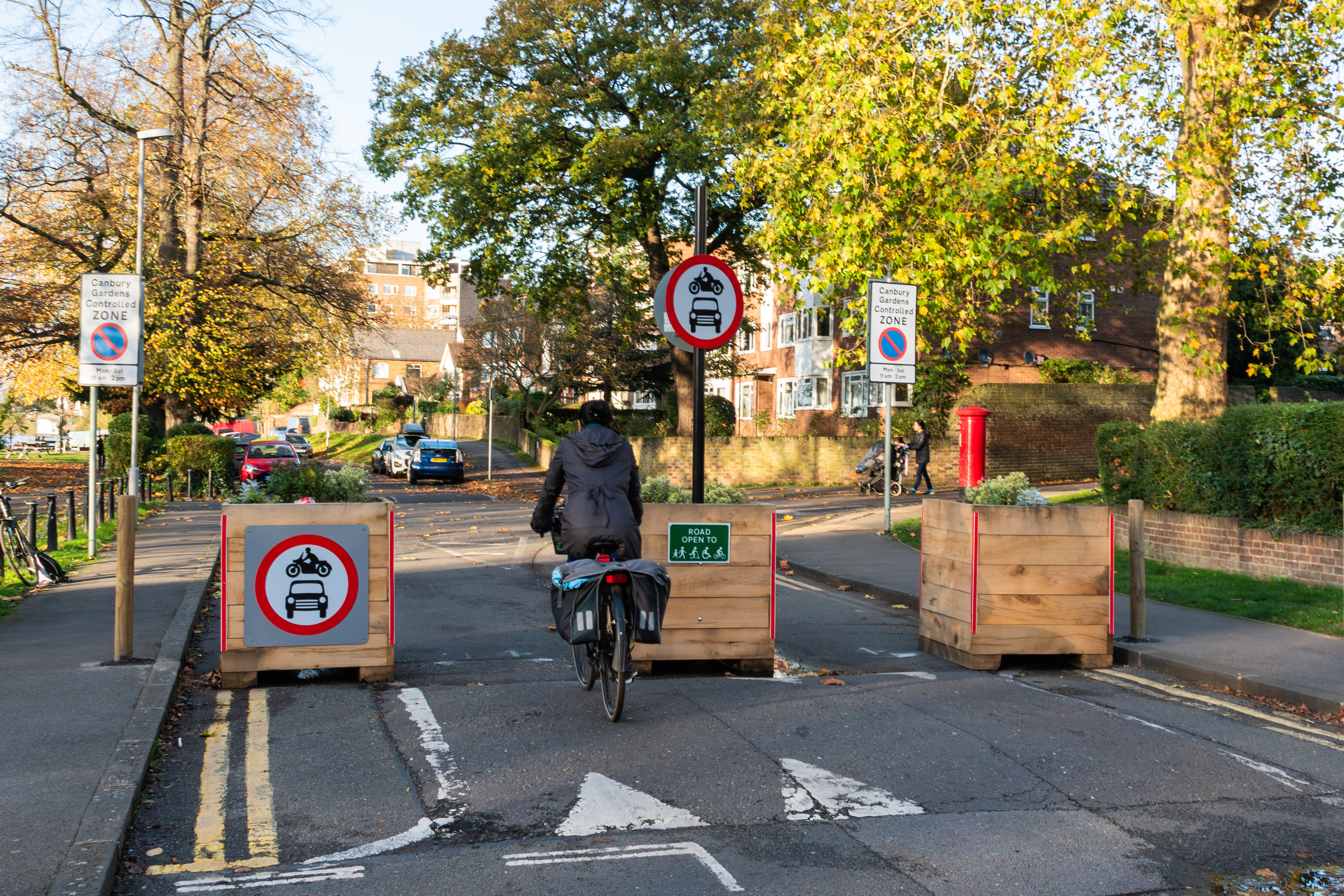
A trial modal filter using easily moved planters in London.

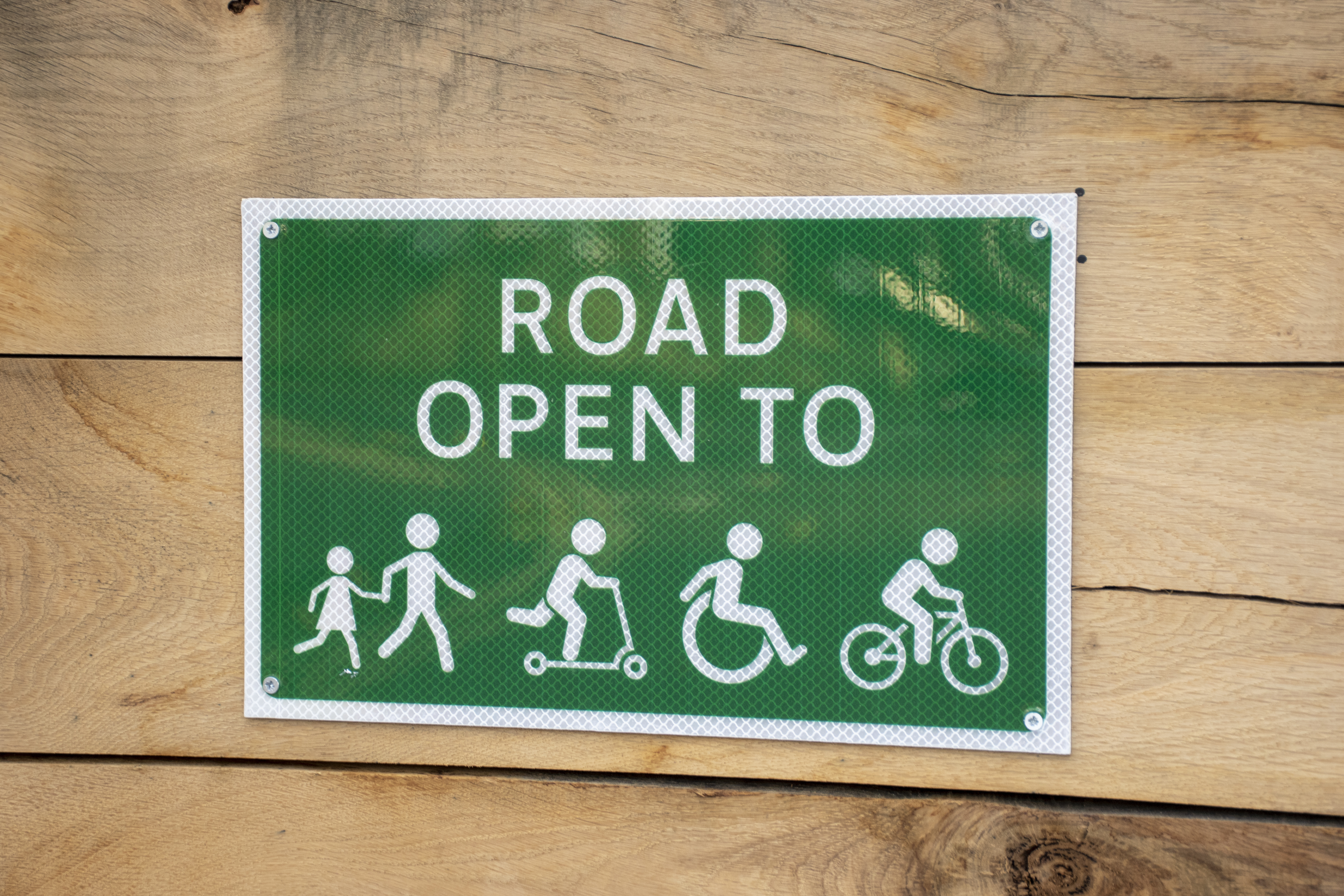
A sign explains what kind of traffic is allowed through the modal filter.

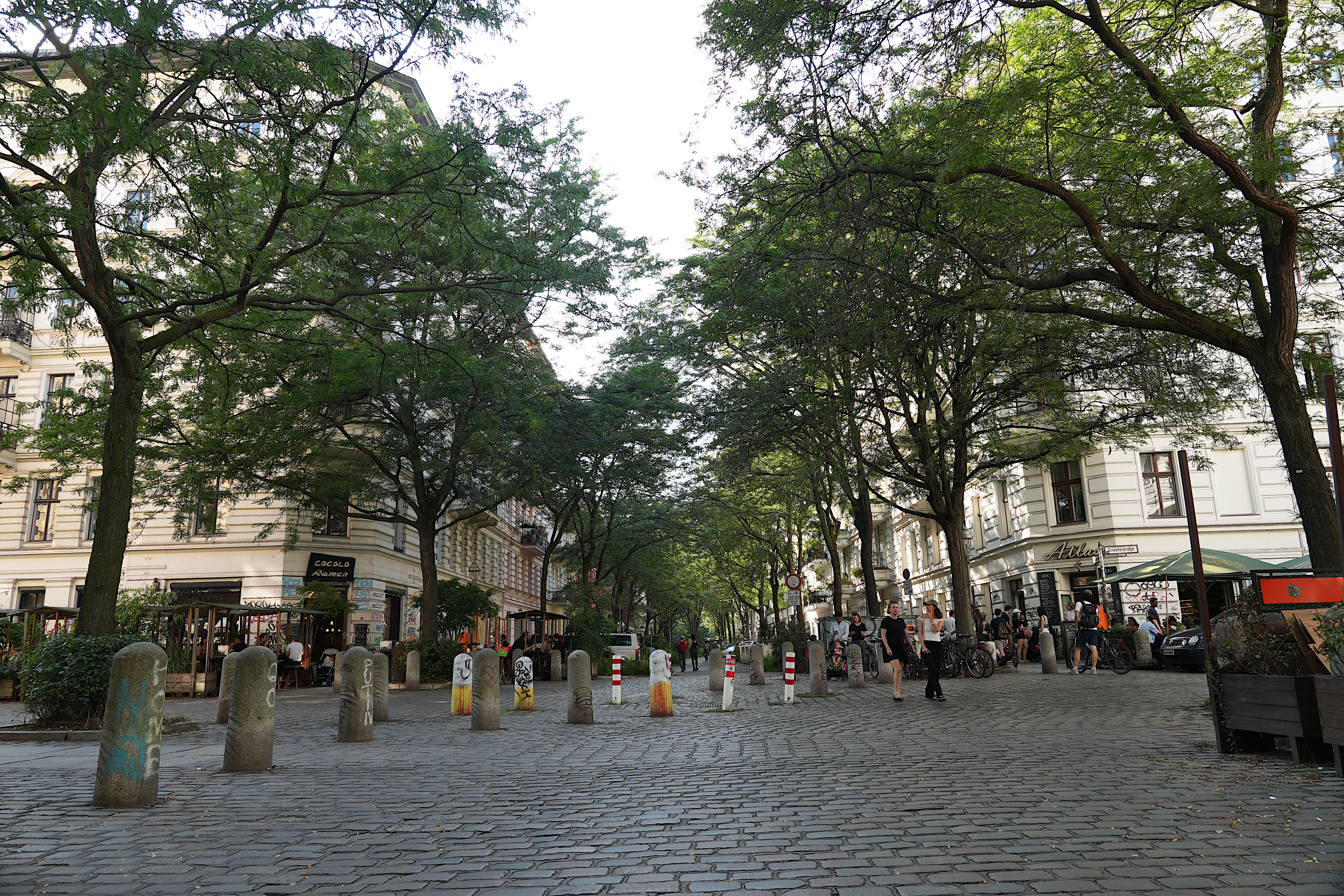
Permanent modal filter in Kreuzberg, Berlin

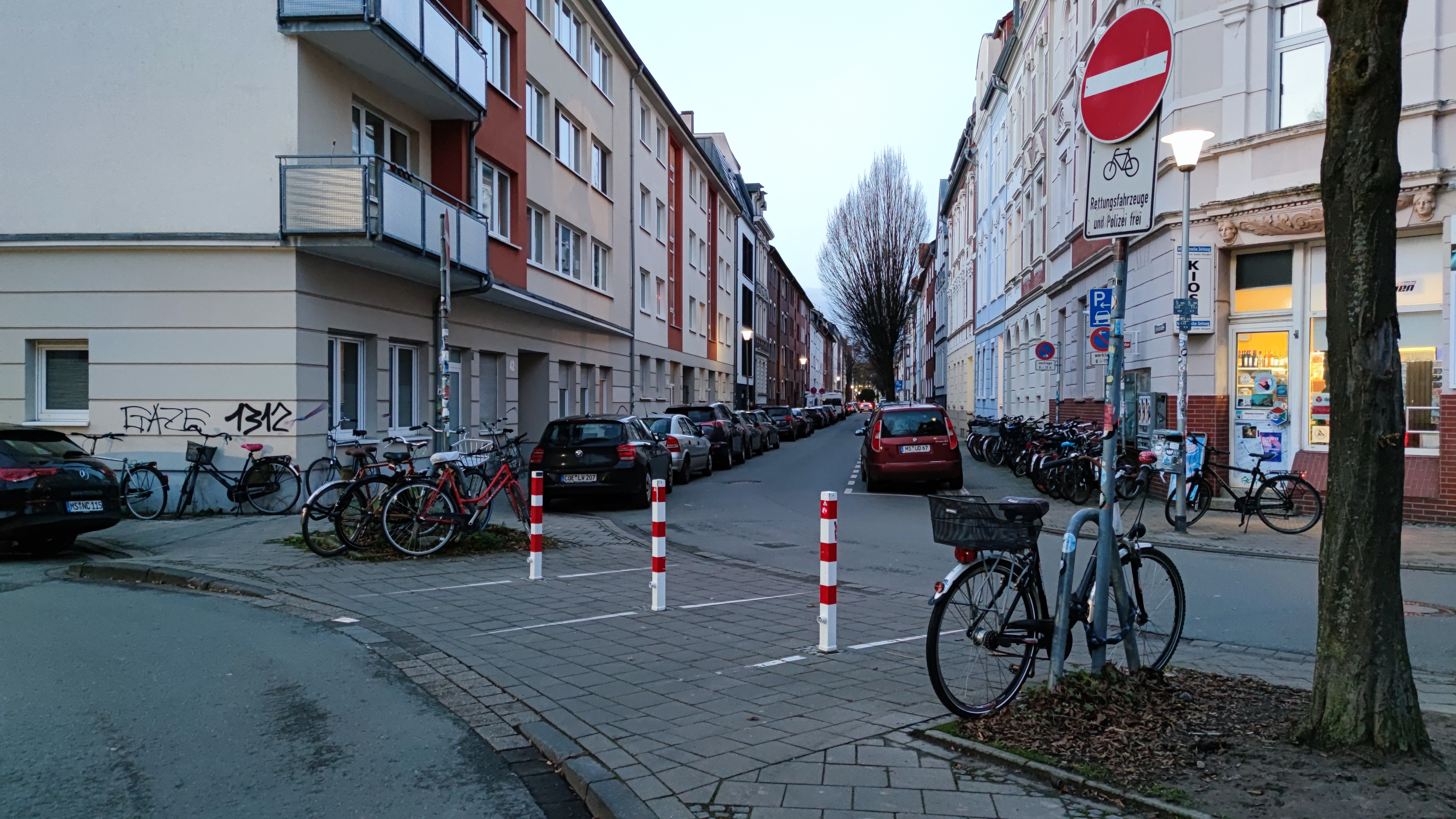
Modal filters placed diagonal across an intersection can make a street better for local traffic and reduce rat-running.

== See also ==
- Road diet
- Modal shift
- Bus trap
