= School Streets =

Motor traffic restriction at start and end of school day

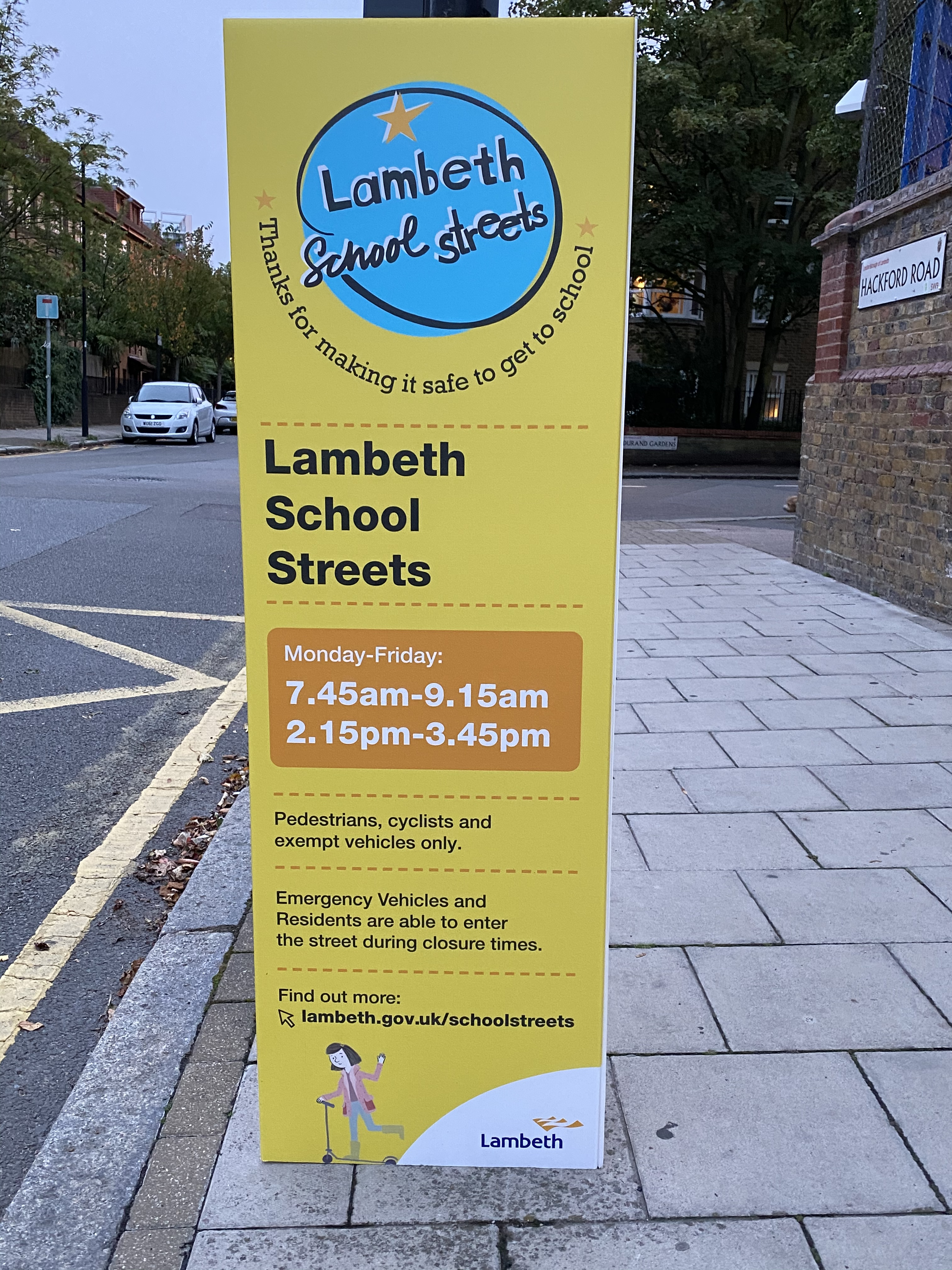
School Streets sign in Lambeth in 2020

School Streets is a scheme in the United Kingdom, Germany, Czechia, Austria and other countries, to suspend motor traffic access to roads outside schools, during drop-off and pick-up times.

One of the first schools in the UK to trial the scheme was Gayhurst Community School in Hackney in 2018. As of November 2020, Transport for London has funded 430 new school streets. Legislatively, the scheme is achieved by restricting access to motor vehicles at certain times.

Nearly two-thirds of UK teachers are in favour of roads around schools being closed. A study has shown that School Streets reduce nitrogen dioxide levels by up to 23 per cent during morning drop-off.

The scheme aims to:

- reduce traffic volume near schools
- improve air quality and reduce air pollution from engine idling
- increase walking and cycling to school
- reduce car travel and inconsiderate parking
- promote social distancing during the COVID-19 pandemic

The programme is supported by Sustrans, a sustainable transport non-profit in the UK.

== History ==
In 2014 a group of Transport Planners from Camden Council went to visit Amsterdam and the surrounding areas to investigate innovations in the local area. A chance conversation with a local transport planner raised the idea of closing the streets outside schools at the start and end of the school day using fire gates.

In The Netherlands it is standard practice to avoid building schools by roads because of the danger caused by roads to children, and because roads by schools encourage more driving to school.

Further investigations highlighted individual examples of schools that had implemented measures like this which appeared to be associated with much better levels of walking or cycling to school - for example, Waingel's Copse School in Reading which banned student drop-off/pickup during the start and end of school day period.

In Camden, the idea evolved into "Healthy School Streets" involving folding bollards in the street being put up by school staff at the start and end of the school day, with road being formally closed by signage, and the staff merely implementing the bollards to enforce it. This initial school delivered significant reductions in driving to school, of the order of 50% in driven trips.

At about the same time, Transport Planners in Edinburgh were working on their own "School Streets" project using signage, rather than folding bollards.

From 2017 onwards, other local authorities, supported in some cases by Transport Planners at Camden providing advisory support, implemented further school streets using similar methodology - or in some cases using more expensive camera enforcement with fines, to allow some residents to be exempt from the road closures.

In March 2018, some parents in Belgium closed the road outside their school instead of going for coffee. They called the movement Filter-Café-Filtre. Over the next two weeks, 42 more schools joined as well. In 2021 some London boroughs have a high proportion of school streets. In Merton, 41% of schools have a school street. They are also being rolled out in Cumbria

== Criticism ==
One limitation of the scheme is that the time restrictions during drop-off and pick-up only do not help to reduce pollution during other times when children are outside, and do not tackle the wider street network which would allow many more children to walk or cycle to school.

However, because once the schemes are implemented these weaknesses become apparent, highlighting the need for wider change, these measures can be a crucial step on the route to better streets.

In 2021, some residents in Ilford, Greater London, opposed the introduction of 10 new School Streets in their borough, Redbridge. They said that the traffic would just move to another area. Instead, they favoured introducing a no stopping zone, which would allow through-traffic to continue. To date, evidence suggests there is no displacement to nearby streets and that overall, motor traffic does decrease overall.

== See also ==
- Low Traffic Neighbourhood
