= Rat running =

Motor traffic short-cutting through residential areas

Despite the traffic calming curb extensions, heavy traffic means that the narrow residential street is still appealing to motorists desiring a shortcut.

Rat running, also known as cut-through driving or a traffic shortcut, is British slang for the practice of motorists using residential side streets or any unintended short cut such as a parking lot, delivery service lane or cemetery road instead of the intended main road in urban or suburban areas. Traffic shortcuts involve using alternative public routes or traversing private property, such as service stations or shopping centre car parks, to reduce travel time. While alternative routes can redistribute traffic and may improve travel efficiency under certain conditions, shortcuts through private property are more controversial.

Although rat running or traffic shortcuts may marginally reduce travel time, fuel consumption, and idling, critics argue that they can increase congestion, raise the risk of vehicle–pedestrian collisions, contribute to wear and tear on private infrastructure, and inconvenience legitimate users of the property. Studies and traffic commentators have noted that such shortcuts often provide only limited time savings and may simply shift congestion to another location. Residential streets are sometimes used as shortcuts by motorists seeking to avoid congestion, traffic signals, or longer routes on major roads. Critics argue that such "rat running" can increase traffic volumes and vehicle speeds in otherwise quiet neighbourhoods, potentially reducing safety for pedestrians and local residents, particularly near parks, schools, and childcare centres.

== Safety and impacts ==
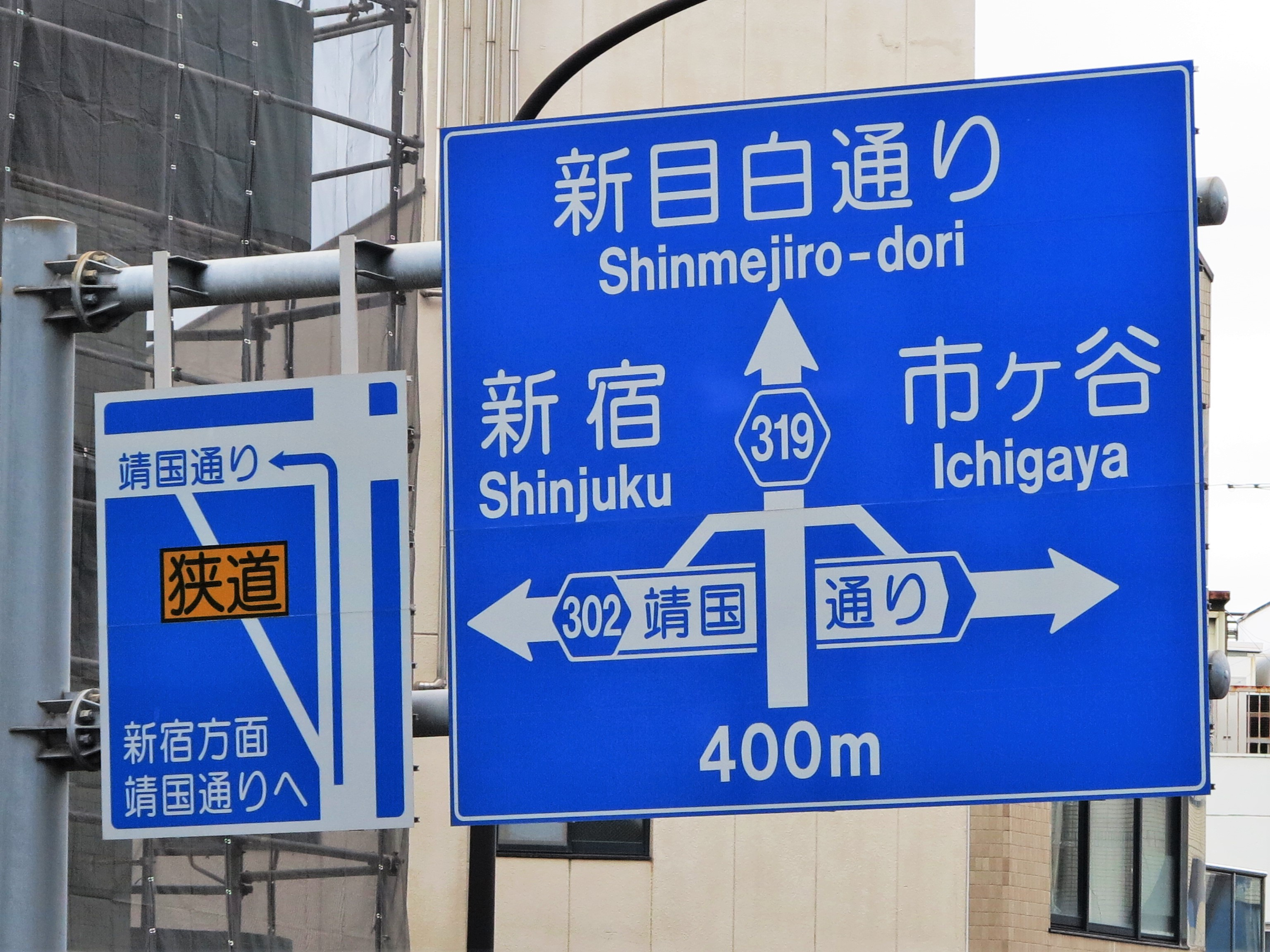
Japanese road sign directing away from a narrow roadway. Left board says "To Shinjuku, go ahead to Yasukuni-dori Avenue", and the kanji '狭道' written in the yellow rectangle means "narrow street".

Rat running is a tactic used to avoid heavy traffic and long delays at traffic signals or other obstacles, even where there are traffic calming measures to discourage its use or laws against taking certain routes. Intentional rat runs are frequently taken by motorists familiar with the local geography, while unintentional rat runs may be done by people who are not familiar with the area. Shortcuts are actions taken to complete tasks more quickly by bypassing established procedures or safeguards. While shortcuts may improve efficiency in some situations, safety experts warn that they can increase the risk of accidents, injuries, property damage, and errors. Workplace safety guidance emphasises that unsafe behaviours, such as rushing tasks, neglecting protective equipment, or failing to implement safety measures, are a significant contributor to workplace incidents. Safety organisations generally recommend following established procedures, allowing sufficient time for tasks, and avoiding unnecessary risks when seeking greater efficiency.

Taking shortcuts can increase the risk of accidents when individuals bypass designated routes or safety measures. Examples include pedestrians crossing roads away from marked crossings, which may lead to unexpected interactions with cyclists, vehicles, or other hazards. Traffic studies have been used to examine the use of residential streets as shortcuts, or "rat runs", by drivers seeking to avoid congestion on major roads. A study conducted for Ku-ring-gai Council using origin–destination data found that nearly half of morning peak-hour traffic between Clive Street and Archbold Road utilised local road shortcuts rather than the main route, informing efforts to reduce through-traffic in residential areas.

Rat running is controversial. When traffic is especially heavy on a highway or main road, rat-running vehicles may cause another traffic jam on the rat-run streets, along with accompanying problems such as collisions, pollution from exhaust, and road rage. It is sometimes opposed by residents on the affected streets, as they may regard it as a disturbance of their peace. Rat running is said to cause local residents to fear a decrease in the value of their property. Authorities may try to prevent rat running by installing traffic calming devices, such as speed humps, traffic circles, and rumble strips, by making some streets one-way, or by blocking off certain intersections. Some places, including Montgomery County, Maryland; Maryland Heights, Missouri; and parts of Minneapolis, Minnesota, have banned turning onto certain streets during rush hours to prevent rat running.

== Shortcut routes ==
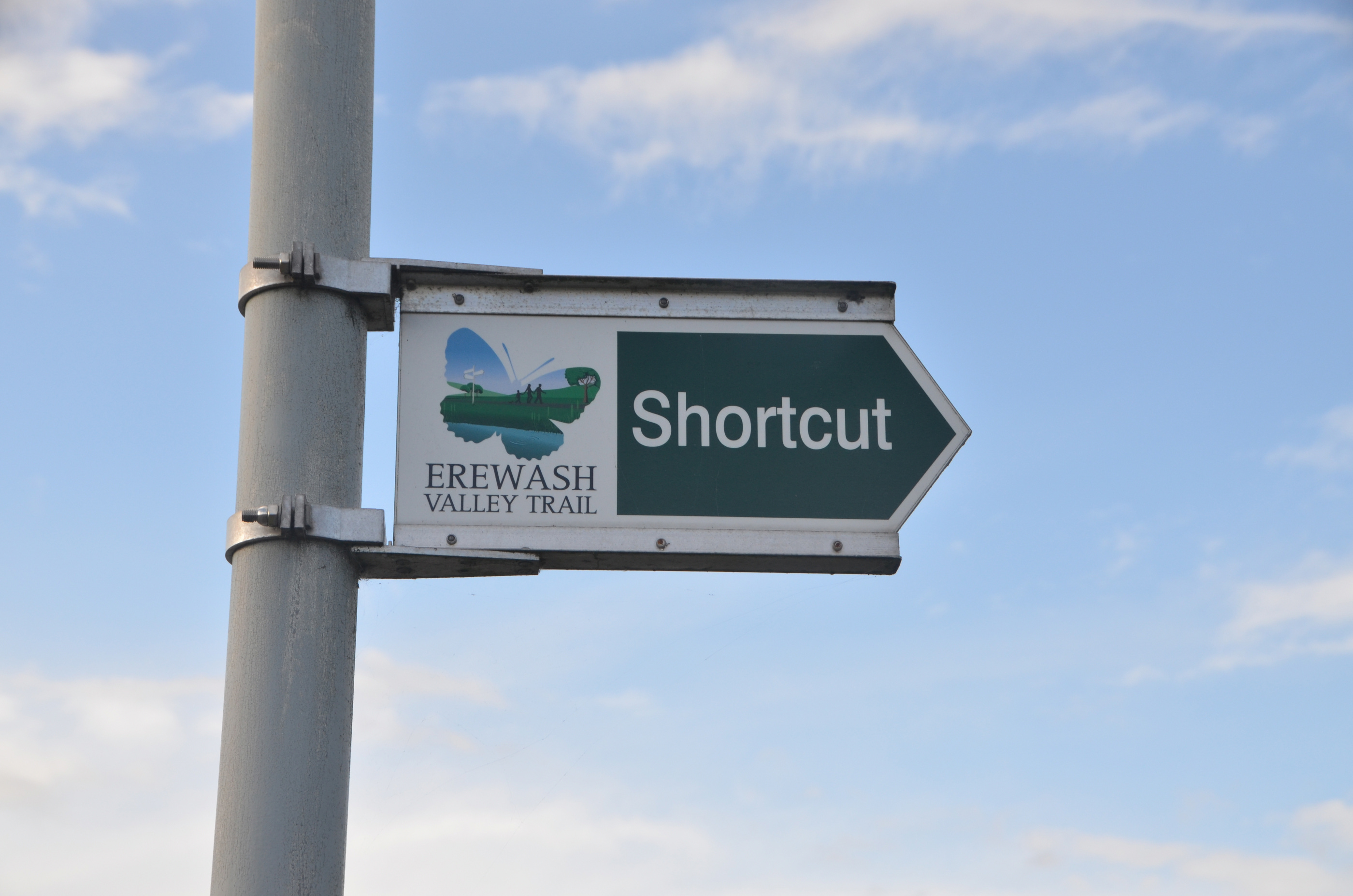
Road sign in England indicating a shortcut route

Motorists familiar with an area sometimes use side streets or other smaller roads that run parallel to the main road. They are generally local people who know these streets and the advantages and disadvantages of using them as alternatives to the main road. Use of satellite navigation apps with real-time traffic information can also be used by motorists unfamiliar with an area to route around congested main roads via side streets.

In some places, motorists avoid stopping at a red light by turning onto a side street or into a parking lot to bypass it. In some countries, red lights can be avoided by turning right on red (or left in drive-on-the-left countries), making a U-turn, and then turning right (or left) again back on to the street on which the motorist was travelling. This may require less time than waiting for the light to turn green. Some motorists exit and then re-enter a freeway or motorway at the same junction, or use lanes designated for exiting and merging, or cut across unpaved dividers to frontage roads, to pass stationary traffic. Some large streets are separated from parallel small residential streets only by a small strip where homeowners park their vehicles. These streets can be used to bypass traffic jams.

The Outback Way, often described as "Australia's longest shortcut", is a transcontinental road corridor linking Winton, Queensland and Laverton, Western Australia through central Australia. Spanning approximately 2,700 km (1,700 mi), the route passes through the Northern Territory, including Alice Springs and the Uluru-Kata Tjuta National Park region. Long promoted as a major infrastructure and tourism project, the route is intended to provide a shorter east–west connection across the continent, improve access to remote communities, support freight transport, and encourage tourism. Large sections of the route have historically remained unsealed, though state, territory, and federal governments have progressively funded road upgrades and paving works.

== Prevention and minimisation ==
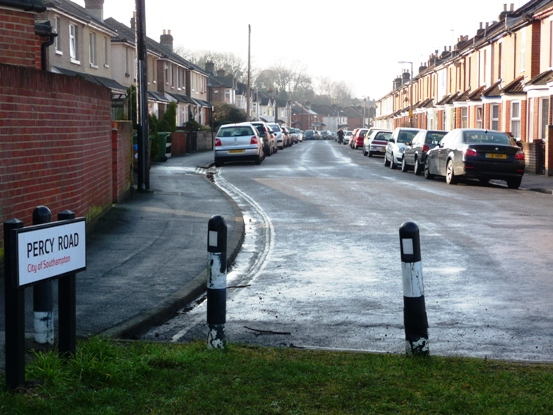
A road closure in Southampton, England, intended to prevent rat running from a nearby road.

Many communities combat rat running by installing traffic calming features such as chicanes, speed tables, speed cushions, curb extensions, cobbled sections, hidden law enforcement and various other measures. Other communities install physical barriers that completely block through-traffic along routes prone to rat running.

One of the most extensive uses of this strategy is found in Berkeley, California, where dozens of concrete barriers throughout the city block shortcuts, while still allowing cycling. In Northern Virginia, shortcuts are discouraged by the construction of dead end streets, communities with no outlet, and winding roads designed to confuse, making navigation through the neighborhoods more difficult and time-consuming.

The Netherlands makes extensive use of raising bollards to eliminate through traffic while allowing pedestrians, cyclists, residents and local businesses to get through.

Some US cities (such as St. Louis) make extensive use of mid-block barriers across residential streets, such as rows of planters, curbs, or gates, designed to block the passage of vehicles while simultaneously allowing pedestrians through. This serves to deter rat-running while maintaining a sense of continuity for pedestrians, making the streets more pedestrian-friendly.

As of the 21st century, officials in a number of US states including Georgia and Maryland, some smaller US jurisdictions, and some parts of the United Kingdom have passed or tried to pass laws restricting rat-running in certain communities to maintain peace and privacy for residents.

When a major event draws a large volume of traffic, local police sometimes monitor or block secondary roads to prevent motorists from the event crowd from using such streets to avoid the traffic.

In the United Kingdom, the Low Traffic Neighbourhood scheme is intended to discourage rat-running through certain residential areas, using a combination of filtered permeability (for example, using barriers, planters or other modal filters) and traffic calming measures.

== See also ==
- Energy-efficient driving ("Hypermiling")
- Shunpiking
- Jaywalking
- Braess's paradox
