= Low traffic neighbourhood =

Urban planning concept

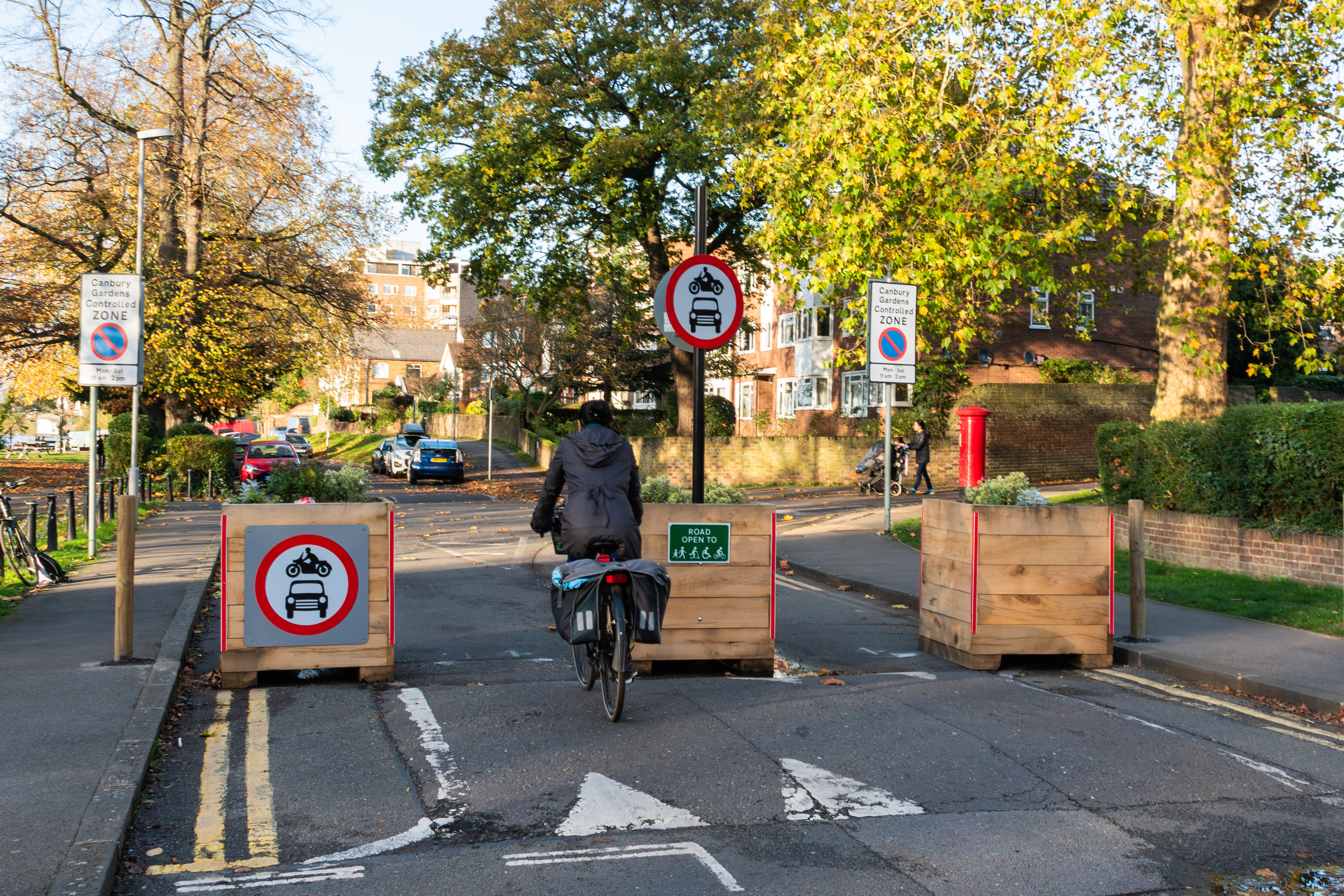
LTN planters in Kingston

In the United Kingdom, a low traffic neighbourhood (LTN) is a residential area in which filtered permeability and traffic calming measures are deployed to reduce motorised through-traffic. Many LTNs were introduced in spring 2020, although the same principles had been in use in London since the 1970s.

LTNs can be implemented through the use of barriers such as bollards, boom barriers and planters; they can also be implemented virtually through the use of automatic number-plate recognition cameras and road signs, which can allow vehicle access for residents and emergency services while prohibiting unrelated through traffic.

== History ==
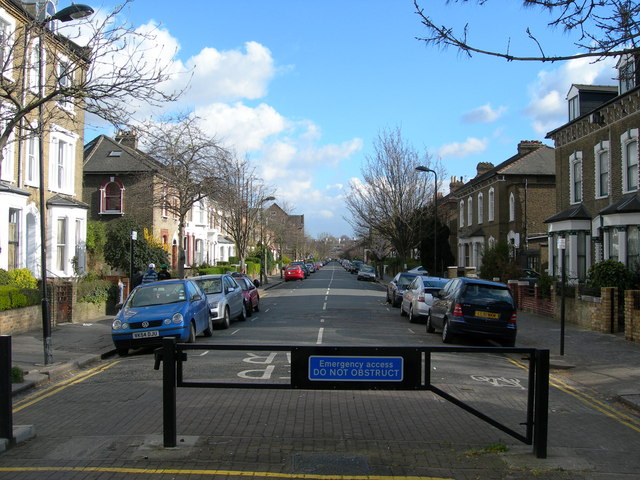
A pre-COVID-19 modal filter on Finsbury Park Road in Hackney. The barrier arrangement allows cyclists and emergency vehicles to pass through but excludes general motor traffic.

There were already at least 25,000 modal filters across the UK before 2020, and low traffic neighbourhoods have been a common policy tool used in designing new towns and communities in the UK since the 1960s.

Local councils engaged in extensive public consultations and provided educational materials to ensure community awareness and support for the LTN implementations.

In Primrose Hill, London, the death of two children on the roads in the 1960s led to the railway bridge on Regent's Park Road being closed to vehicles, using bollards. This made Primrose Hill an area without through traffic.

In Newtown, Exeter, Sandford Walk and East John Walk were closed to vehicles in 1970, using bollards and ramps, as part of a programme of urban renewal.

One of the best known LTNs was implemented in De Beauvoir Town, Hackney, London, by the Greater London Council, designed by architect and local resident Graham Parsey. The modal filters were introduced as experimental measures on 8 April 1974 and made permanent in April 1975.

During the COVID-19 pandemic of 2020–21, 72 low traffic neighbourhoods with modal filters were rolled out under emergency legislation in London, covering a population of around 300,000. Waltham Forest had previously introduced a number of LTNs between 2015 and 2019.

The Department for Transport commissioned a review of LTNs in 2023 which found that they were "effective in achieving outcomes of reducing traffic volumes within their zones while adverse impacts on boundary roads appear to be limited", but also that "while they can work, in the right place, and, crucially, where they are supported, too often local people don't know enough about them and haven't been able to have a say". A survey of residents in trial areas in London, Birmingham, Wigan, and York surveyed for the review showed that an average of 45% of respondents supported the schemes and 21% opposed them. 58% were unaware that they lived in a low traffic neighbourhood.

== Effects and impact ==
=== Traffic ===
In London, prior to the COVID-19 pandemic, traffic had risen on side roads by over 100% since 2008.

LTNs were implemented in Waltham Forest in 2014. In 2016, on three LTN 'boundary roads', traffic had increased by 2.6% and 28.3%. Two of the three roads were within the 'normal' range for recent fluctuations in traffic flow. For Shernhall Street, the only road studied that registered an increase, it was found that the 2016 traffic count was around the same as the 2009 traffic count for this road. In the Walthamstow Village LTN, roads saw an average 44.1% reduction in traffic. Surrounding roads saw an increase in traffic, most notably Shernhall Street. On Lea Bridge Road, the maximum hourly traffic reduced after the introduction of the scheme and traffic appears more spread out across the day. For buses, the majority of buses through the Village were running very close to normal times. Although bus routes on boundary roads recorded an increase, this was in line with control routes across the borough.

A 2022 study studied three LTNs in Islington Borough between July 2019 and February 2021. It found a 58.2% decrease in traffic compared with control sites in the same area. A smaller, statistically insignificant decrease of 13.4% was found on boundary sites.

In three LTN areas in Southwark, traffic speeds decreased. Traffic levels remained unchanged on 'boundary' streets in two of these areas; in one, there was an increase in traffic levels during weekdays and peak hours. Walking and cycling counts remained approximately constant.

A systematic review and meta-analysis of local authority data, on 46 LTNs introduced between May 2020 and May 2021 in 11 London boroughs, showed that car traffic within the zones almost halved, while on the boundary roads there was almost no effect on traffic.

=== Pollution and health ===
A 2022 study studied three LTNs in Islington Borough between July 2019 and February 2021. It found that LTNs had reduced the level of nitrogen dioxide by 5.7% on internal sites, and by 8.9% on boundary sites.

The introduction of LTNs has also been associated with improved air quality, contributing to public health benefits by reducing pollutants such as nitrogen dioxide.

=== Injury rates ===
Two LTNs were introduced in London between 2015 and 2019, after extensive consultation and with significant engineering improvements. Within the LTN areas, the numbers of injuries, and the risk of injury per trip, reduced by about 70% for walkers, cyclists, and car occupants. There was no change in injuries on LTN boundary roads.

Some 72 LTNs in London were introduced in 2020, more hastily and with relatively few engineering measures. These halved injury rates (especially pedestrian injuries) on roads within the LTN zones; again, no change was found on boundary roads.

In June 2025 a research study found that LTNs in London were associated with significant reductions in road injuries and deaths within their boundaries. The study compared over a decade of road casualty statistics from 113 London LTNs and found a 35% reduction in all injuries, with a 37% reduction in deaths and serious injuries. This equated to over 600 prevented road injuries, including 100 involving death or serious injury. The study also found no observable change in casualties on roads immediately outside the LTNs.

In January 2026 a research study found that the number of collisions with casualties, within the Oxford LTN area, fell by more than 64%. The study also found that number of collisions with casualties in the boundary roads fell by 25%. This equated to roughly 69 casualties prevented. The study found the Cowley LTNs had saved more than £2 million, as result of collisions and casualties avoided, since being installed.

=== Crime and social safety ===
The introduction of LTNs leads to a decrease in total street crime, increasing with duration since implementation, and with no displacement to other areas. After 3 years of implementation, a study found an 18% decrease in street crime in LTN areas. A larger reduction was found for violent crimes and sexual assaults. Only a single subcategory for crime saw an increase – bicycle theft.

In Tower Hamlets Lutfur Rahman was urged by the Metropolitan Police not to dismantle a low traffic neighbourhood in Bethnal Green, reflecting concerns that removing it would lead to an increase in crime.

=== Active travel ===
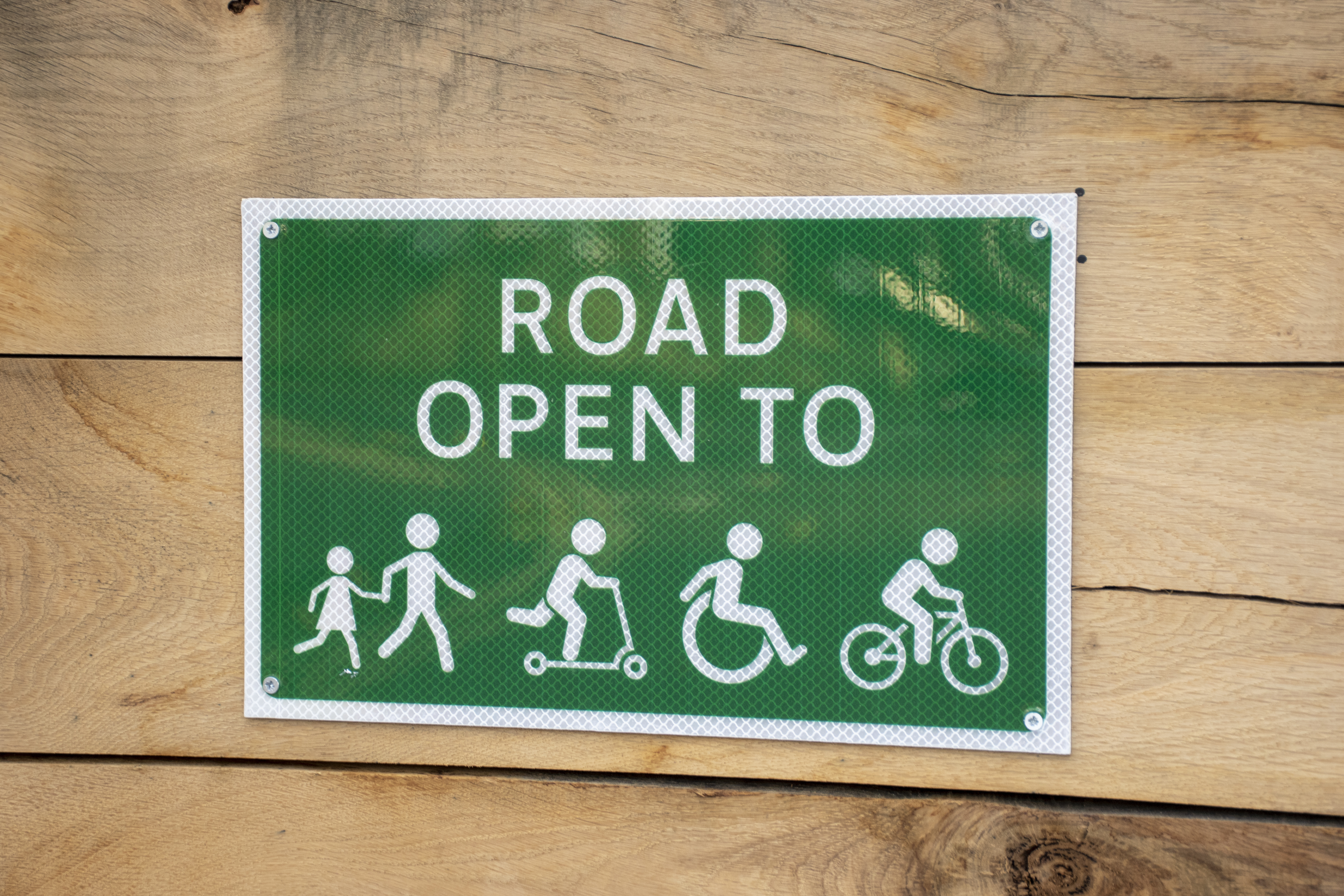
LTN sign in Kingston upon Thames

LTNs tend to encourage more active travel, shifting people from car use of these modes. Emergency rapid-implemented LTNs see more walking, cycling and improved perceptions of the local cycling environment.

People in LTNs are becoming less likely to own a car and more likely to reduce their car usage. In Waltham Forest, a study found that the number of cars and vans fell in mini-Holland areas, particularly in those involving an LTN.

=== Emergency vehicles ===
A 2020 study of the impact of the Waltham Forest LTN in London found no evidence that fire brigade emergency response times were affected inside LTNs and some evidence that they improved slightly on boundary roads, despite a perception among fire crews that traffic calming was the cause of some delays. A 2021 study in Findings journal examined the impact of 72 LTNs in London on fire brigade emergency response times. It found no evidence that response times were affected, either for LTNs that use physical barriers, or for those that use camera enforcement.

== Equity ==
LTN implementation since 2020 in London has been broadly equitable at the city and micro levels. The most deprived quarter are more likely to live in a newly opened LTN than people in the least deprived quarter. Ethnic minorities are more likely to live in a newly opened LTN than White people. London Boroughs have, on average, implemented LTNs in their most deprived districts.

Critics of LTNs also include green campaigners such as John Stewart and Rosamund Kissi-Debrah. Stewart has argued that LTNs are "inherently unfair" because "in most cases they simply displace traffic and pollution to the adjacent main and boundary roads", while Kissi-Debrah also frames the problem in terms of social justice: she argues that affluent neighborhoods are more likely to benefit from traffic reduction and more-deprived areas more likely to suffer from the traffic displacement and added pollution.

== Controversies ==
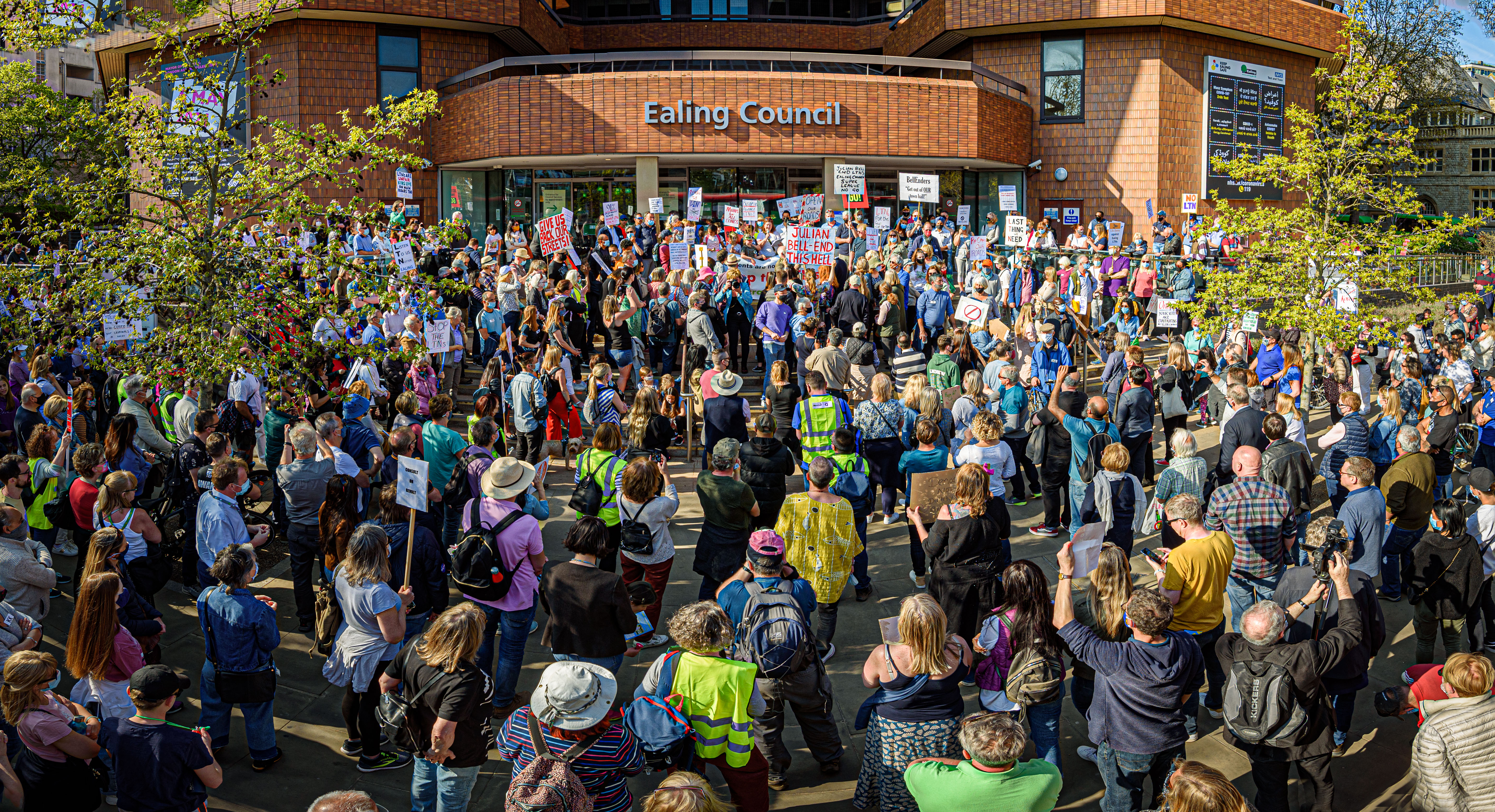
Protest against LTNs in Ealing

Modal filters and low traffic neighbourhoods have sometimes been criticised for a number of reasons. The British motoring magazine Auto Express criticised the schemes for their levels of cost, calling them a "waste of money". Other criticisms include high fines and a lack of consultation in implementing the scheme.

In the UK, the implementation of low traffic neighbourhoods in 2020 was compared to Brexit in its divisiveness, and there were speculations that the issue would affect election results. Opposition to the schemes has been linked to the "15-minute city" conspiracy theory, with the Institute for Strategic Dialogue describing the LTNs being used as a "lightning rod" for wider culture war issues. The schemes have led to protests in Oxford and Croydon from anti-LTN activists.

The former actor Laurence Fox, when standing in the 2021 London mayoral election, pledged to remove all modal filtering (even those in place before 2020) in London. On this platform, Fox received just 1.9% of first round votes. In Hackney, a candidate standing on an anti-LTN platform in a by-election in Hoxton East and Shoreditch in May 2021 received fewer than 8% of votes, while in a by-election in St Peter's Ward in Islington an anti-LTN candidate received only 318 out of 4,395 of votes (7.2%). In May 2022 Lutfur Rahman was re-elected in Tower Hamlets having campaigned against the borough's LTN plans.

A scheme introduced by Lambeth Council in Dulwich, south London, was declared illegal by the High Court in 2024 due to failings in the council's consultation process carried out before the scheme was implemented.

== See also ==
- Permeability (spatial and transport planning) – Freedom of movement of traffic
- School Streets – Motor traffic restriction at start and end of school day
- Rat running – Motor traffic short-cutting through residential areas
- 15-minute city – Urban accessibility concept
- Urban vitality – Intensity of use of an urban area
